= Gallup Park =

Park in Ann Arbor, Michigan, United States

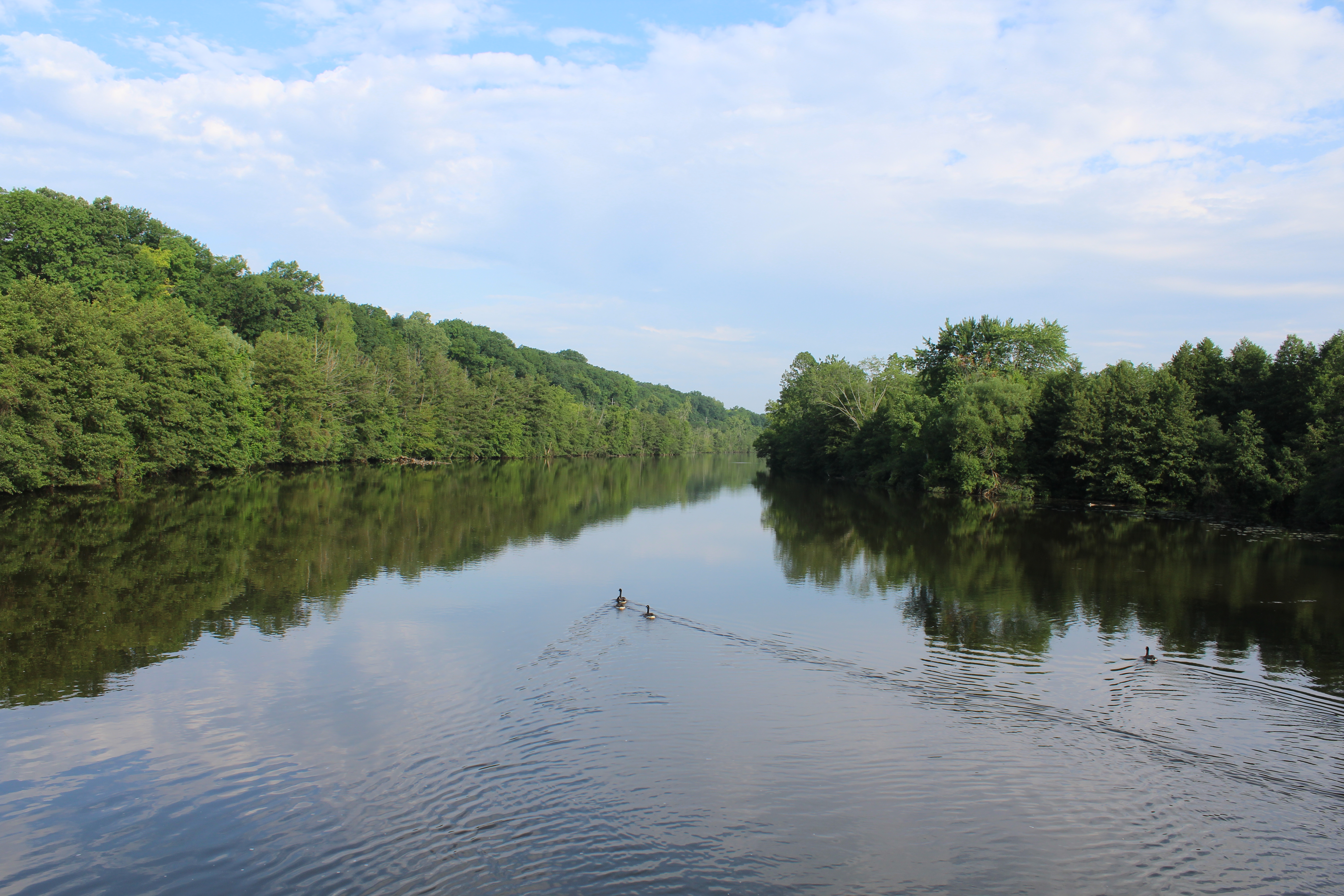
- View of the Huron River in the park
- Location: Washtenaw County, Michigan
- Coordinates: 42°16′22″N 83°41′32″W
- Area: 69 acres (28 ha)
- Designated: April 21, 1958
- Operated by: City of Ann Arbor Parks and Recreation
- Facilities: Canoe livery
- Website: www.a2gov.org/departments/Parks-Recreation/parks-places/Pages/Gallup.aspx

Gallup Park is a public park on the Huron River in Ann Arbor, Michigan. Gallup Park is the busiest park in the Ann Arbor parks system, and features multiple amenities including a canoe livery, universal-access playgrounds, and a public boat launch. The park's pathways form a major component of the Border-to-Border Trail, a multi-use trail that spans Washtenaw County.

== Location ==
Gallup Park is located on the Huron River at Geddes Pond, an impoundment of the river created by Geddes Dam. The 69-acre (28 ha) park contains a series of artificial islands in Geddes Pond, with bridges between the islands creating a 1.65-mile (2.66 km) trail loop that connects both sides of the river.

The longest pathway in Gallup Park carries the Border-to-Border Trail for 3.25 miles (5.23 km), from Mitchell Field upstream to Geddes Dam downstream, parallel to the tracks of the Michigan Line.

Gallup Park connects to multiple adjacent parks along the Huron River, including Mitchell Field, Furstenburg Nature Area, and Parker Mill County Park. The park borders the Nichols Arboretum and Huron Hills Golf Course, but access is obstructed by the Michigan Line railroad tracks.

Most of the park is located within Ann Arbor city limits, except for its eastern entrance, which extends into Ann Arbor Charter Township.

== Amenities ==
The Gallup Park canoe livery operates in tandem with a sister facility upstream at Argo Park, renting boats for local use on Geddes Pond and one-way trips on the river. The canoe livery building also features event space, a cafe, and year-round restrooms.

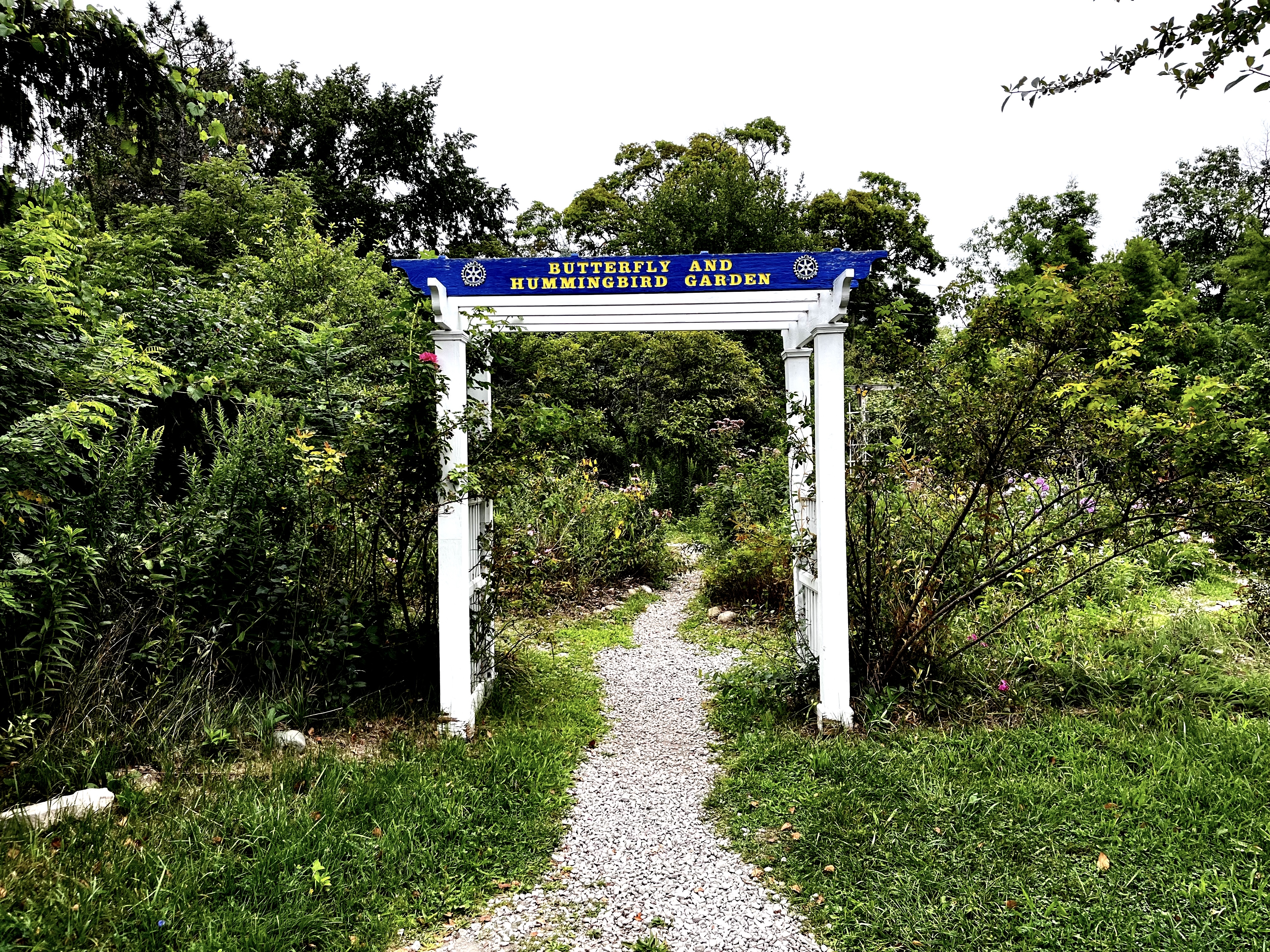
Entrance to the Butterfly and Hummingbird Garden

A butterfly garden was created in the park in 1989, supported by the Ann Arbor North chapter of the Rotary Club. The Butterfly and Hummingbird Garden supports a habitat for butterflies and hummingbirds, whose population peaks in the fall.

Gallup Park serves as a habitat for multiple species of birds, especially in a meadow of sedge on the north side of the river. Species present in Gallup Park include the willow flycatcher, downy woodpecker, and the prothonotary warbler. During the winter, additional species of waterfowl are often seen in the park, including the common merganser and other species of ducks.

Gallup Park is home to multiple works of art. The largest artwork on display is Canoe Fan, a monumental sculpture by Victoria Fuller installed in 2015. Other sculptures installed in the park include larger-than-life concrete figures of animals found in the park, including a Canada goose, a painted turtle, and a muskrat. In addition to its permanent art installations, Gallup Park hosts an annual temporary art installation, "Embracing Our Differences Michigan," since 2022. Embracing Our Differences Michigan focuses on the topic of diversity, equity, and inclusion, presenting artworks from local and national artists of all ages. Gallup Park is its largest site, with additional installations at parks throughout the Ann Arbor–Ypsilanti area.

== History ==
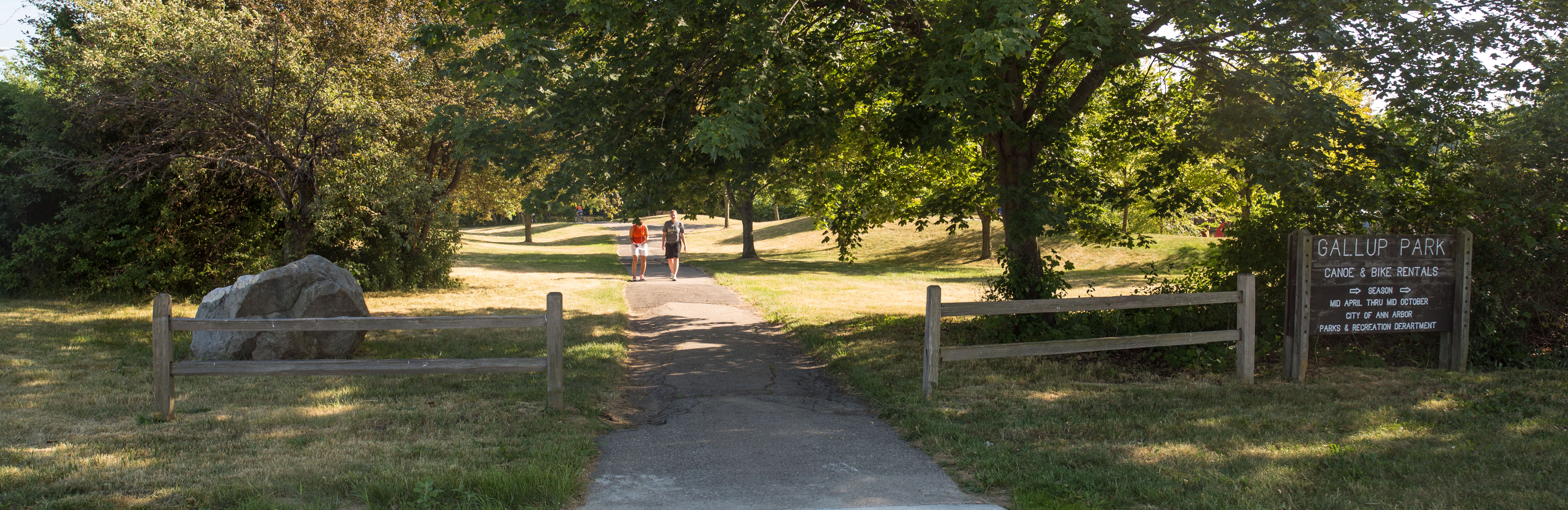
Entrance to Gallup Park from Huron Parkway

Gallup Park is located on Geddes Pond, an impoundment of the Huron River created by Geddes Dam. Detroit Edison operated Geddes Dam for hydropower in the early 20th century, in coordination with three other dams on the Huron River: Barton Dam, Argo Dam, and Superior Dam. By the late 1950s, Detroit Edison was no longer interested in operating the dams, and offered them to the City of Ann Arbor. Detroit Edison sold the four dams to the city in 1963 for a total of $400,000, equivalent to $3.1 million in 2024.

A parcel of land upstream of Geddes Dam was purchased by the city in 1955, and designated as "Gallup Lake Park" in 1958. The original 14-acre (5.7 ha) site on the south side of the river was overgrown and marshy, with a large population of wildlife. The site was only accessible from the back of the adjacent Huron Hills Golf Course, separated by the main line of the Michigan Central Railroad. Construction began slowly, using surplus landfill from building projects around the city, including the construction of Mary Markley Hall in the late 1950s.

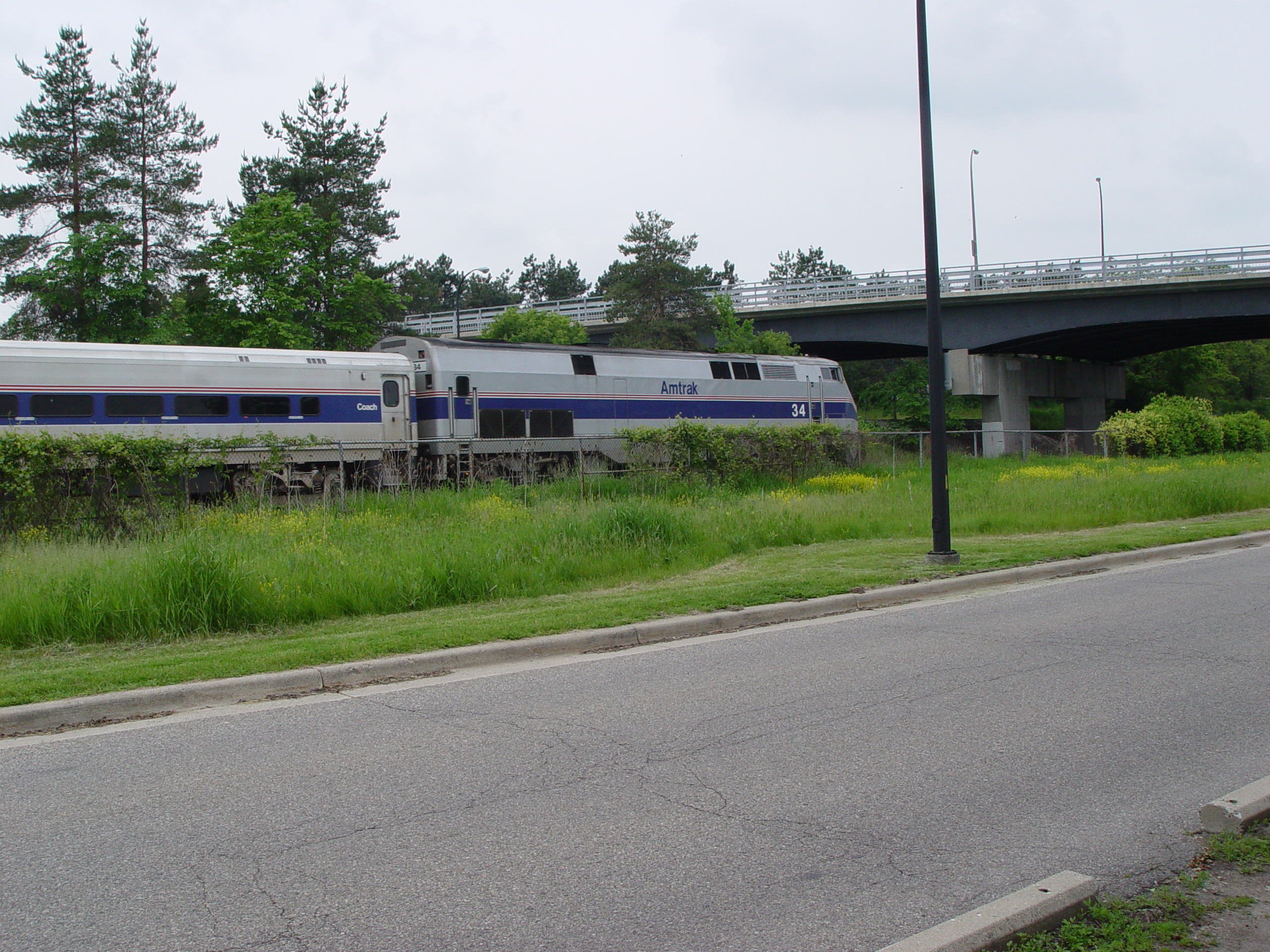
Amtrak's Wolverine train passing through Gallup Park in 2003

Geddes Dam failed in the summer of 1968 following a major rainstorm, draining Geddes Pond and diminishing the population of wildlife in the park. Funding to repair the dam was secured in 1971, and repairs to Geddes Dam were completed in 1973. While Geddes Pond was dry, plans were drawn up for improvements to the site, centered on the principle of "return to the river." The designs emphasized the role of water in the site, with a series of artificial islands in the middle of Geddes Pond connected by bridges.

Major earthworks, including the construction of the islands, were completed while the pond was dry, with a second phase of improvements completed after the pond was refilled in 1973. These improvements included a wooden bridge over the river for cars, and a series of footbridges between the islands.

The 1976-vintage one-lane timber car bridge deteriorated substantially in the 21st century, and was demolished in February 2024. A replacement bridge was expected to be completed in the summer of 2024, but was delayed. A new bridge opened in October 2024, providing additional space for pedestrians and cyclists and retaining a single car lane.

== Namesake ==
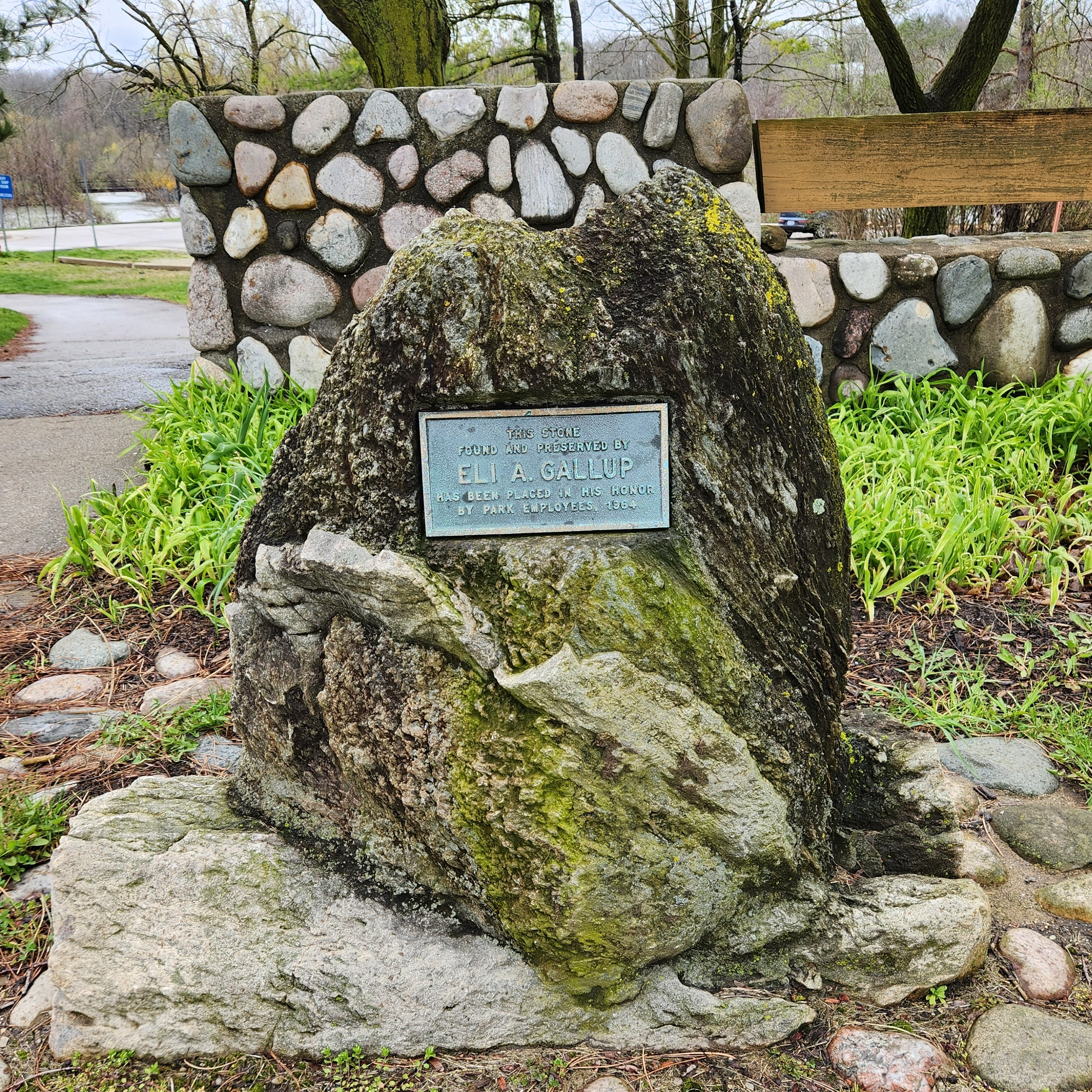
Memorial rock at the north entrance to Gallup Park, dedicated to Eli Gallup

Eli A. Gallup (1891-1964) served as the Superintendent of Parks in Ann Arbor for over 40 years, from 1919 to 1961. Gallup was born in Macedon, New York, and graduated from the University of Michigan School of Forestry with a master's degree in 1916. During his four decades of service to the City of Ann Arbor, Gallup personally directed projects that resulted in the creation of the Ann Arbor parks system as it is known today. Gallup was known for his personal flair and his conservation of scarce resources, and his initiatives resulted in the creation of Ann Arbor icons such as The Rock.

A memorial to Gallup stands at the north entrance to the park. Gallup's intense interest in unusual boulders inspired the memorial, a boulder of dark granite fused to a smaller piece of white limestone. The boulder, excavated during the construction of Huron Hills Golf Course, was found in a maintenance yard after his death, and dedicated in his memory.
