= Argo Dam =

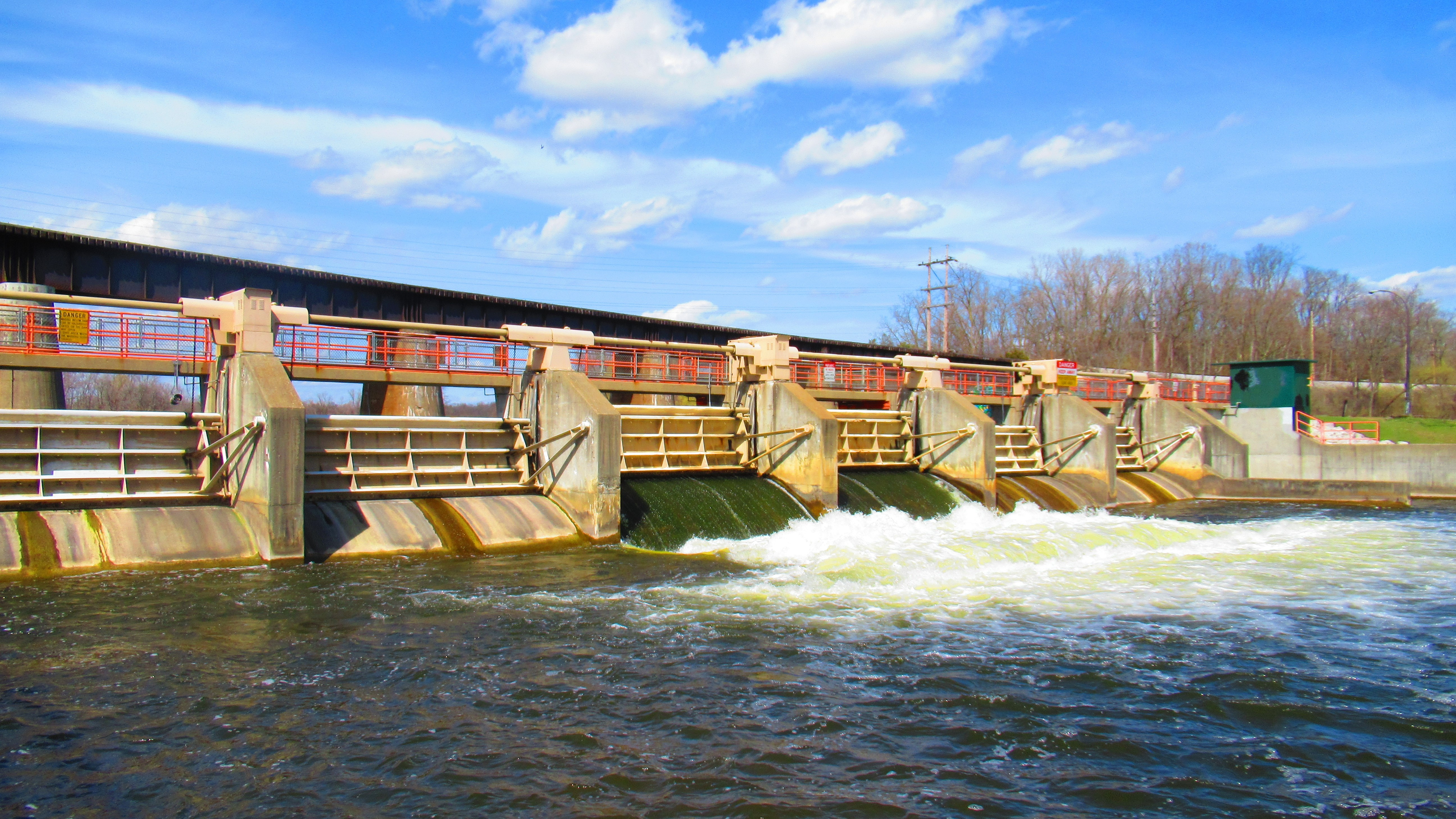
- Argo Dam in April 2020

- Location within the state of Michigan
- Location: Huron River; Ann Arbor, Michigan
- Coordinates: 42°17′26″N 83°44′45″W
- Purpose: Power
- Status: Decommissioned
- Opening date: 1920; 106 years ago
- Owner: City of Ann Arbor

Dam and spillways
- Type of dam: Barrage
- Impounds: Huron River
- Height: 18 feet (5.5 m)
- Length: 150 feet (45.7 m)
- Width (crest): 162.5 feet (49.5 m)
- Spillway capacity: 8,500 ft^{3}/s (240.7 m^{3}/s)

Reservoir
- Total capacity: 92 acres (37.2 ha)

The Argo Dam is a decommissioned hydroelectric barrage dam crossing the Huron River. It is located in the city of Ann Arbor in Washtenaw County in the U.S. state of Michigan. It was built by the Detroit Edison Company in 1920 for hydroelectricity before being decommissioned in 1959 and sold to the city of Ann Arbor in 1963. The surrounding area is used for recreational purposes, including Argo Nature Area and Bandemer Park.

== Description ==
The Argo Dam is located in north-central Ann Arbor about 0.75 miles (1.21 km) south of M-14 (Bus. US 23). The dam is accessible just south of the highway via exit 3 (North Main Street). The Argo Dam is approximately 50.5 miles (81.3 km) from the Huron River mouth at Lake Erie. The nearest dams are the Barton Dam 2.1 miles (3.4 km) upstream and the Geddes Dam 5.0 miles (8.0 km) downstream.

When the dam was completed, the resulting flooding created an unnamed reservoir of 96 acres (39 ha). The reservoir has no official name but is sometimes referred to as the Argo Pond or Argo Impoundment. It sits at an average elevation of 773 feet (236 m) above sea level and has an average depth of 16.3 feet (5.0 m). The reservoir has no noticeable storage capacity or alteration to the surrounding area; it is considered a pondage reservoir. The reservoir extends for about 2.46 miles (3.96 km) upstream from the dam to U.S. Route 23, and it has a maximum width of only 700 feet (213.4 m). The entire shoreline is considered natural with no major alterations to the original landscape.

The dam consists of six automated spillways for a total crest length of 162.5 feet (49.5 m) and a dam length of 150 feet (45.7 m). The dam is 18 feet (5.5 m) tall and has a discharge capacity of 8,500 cubic feet per second (240.7 m^{3}/s).

The dam is one of four dams owned by the city of Ann Arbor. The other dams are the Barton Dam, Geddes Dam, and Superior Dam. Only the Argo Dam and Barton Dam are actually within the city of Ann Arbor. Geddes Dam is within Ann Arbor Township, and Superior Dam is in neighboring Superior Township to the east.

== History ==
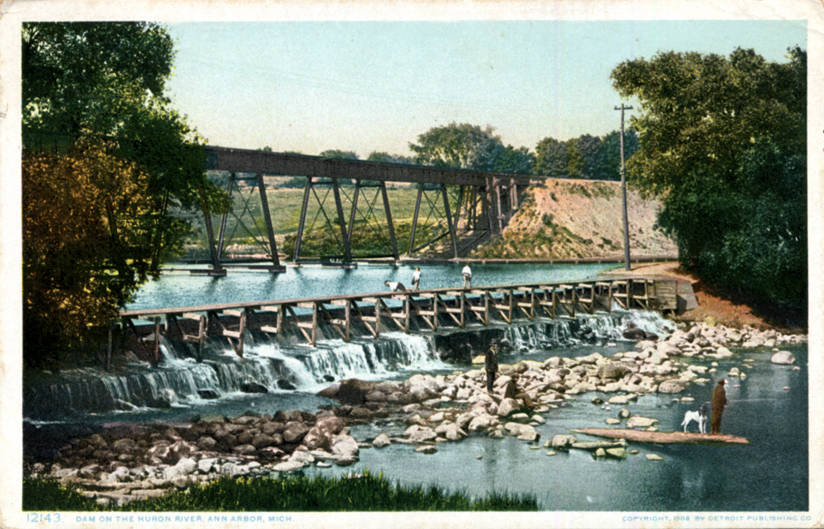
Historic photo of an earlier dam from a 1908 postcard

This stretch of the Huron River was dammed as early as the 1830s. The Argo Dam was completed in 1920 as a series of hydroelectric dams built along the Huron River by the Detroit Edison Company. The Argo Dam was decommissioned in 1959 and no longer utilized for hydroelectric purposes. The dam was soon sold to the city of Ann Arbor in 1963. The dam was rebuilt entirely in 1972 and utilized to maintain water level in the reservoir and for flood control.

At one time, the Detroit Edison Company operated four hydroelectric dams that served Ann Arbor: Argo Dam, Barton Dam, Geddes Dam, and Superior Dam. They were all decommissioned by the early-1960s, but Barton Dam and Superior Dam were recommissioned in the 1980s and currently provide hydroelectricity for Ann Arbor's power grid. Geddes Dam and Argo Dam were left decommissioned, because higher cost estimates and lower energy production kept them from being approved for recommissioning.

In 2008, a plan was initially conceived by the city of Ann Arbor to possibly recommission the Argo Dam and Geddes Dam in order to provide additional electric power to the nearby Ann Arbor VA Medical Center. In 2010, the report found it would cost up to $14.7 million to construct new hydroelectric stations at both decommissioned dams. The transmission lines themselves would cost another $1.3 million, with at least $220,000 per year for maintenance. Funding was ultimately denied. In order to recommission the Argo Dam for hydroelectric purposes, a new powerhouse would also have to be constructed with limited space available due to development of the area. In 2013, the city approved a financial plan to improve the surrounded areas of both Argo Dam and Geddes Dam at a cost of $295,530 to a local contractor. The dam received these significant improvements in 2014, but the idea of recommissioning the dam for hydroelectric purposes was abandoned.

=== Proposed removal ===
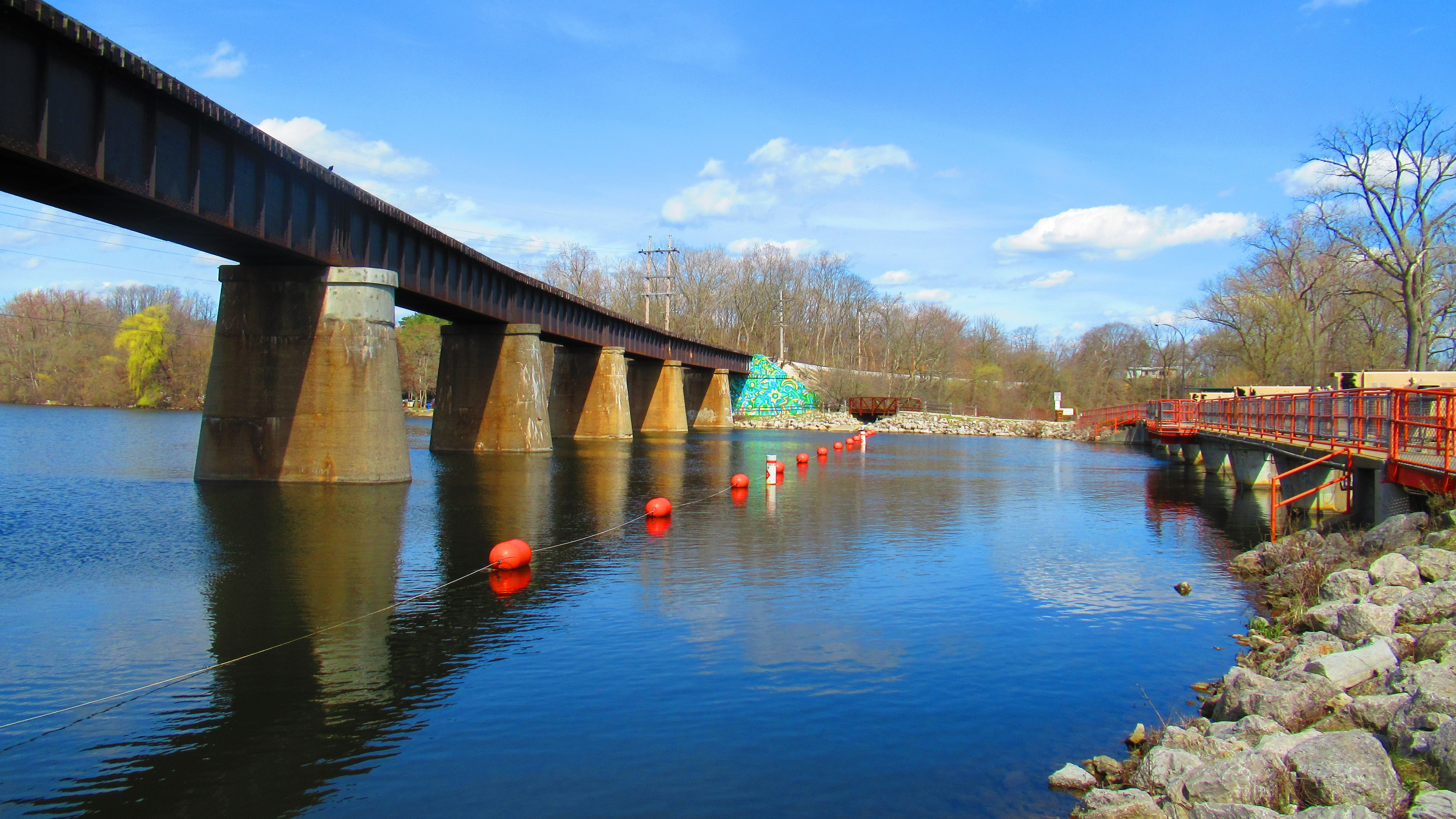
Reservoir side of the Argo Dam

When the dam was deemed insufficient and too costly to reactivate for hydroelectric purposes, various proposals to completely remove the dam were discussed. The most beneficial ecological reasons for removing the Argo Dam included creating a more stable water temperature for the Huron River, as well as providing a more natural flow of the river for at least 6 miles (9.7 km) from the Barton Dam to the Geddes Dam. Removing the dam would also allow for increased fish populations, as the reservoir itself does not support a high population of fish. Due to the slow-moving water of the reservoir, undesirable zebra mussels are very abundant and would dissipate under a faster water flow. The cost of removing the dam may also be funded by federal economic-stimulus dollars. Removing the dam would lower the water level and uncover an estimated 28–50 acres (11.3–20.2 ha) of usable park land along the river, as well as increasing the navigable course of the river for kayaks.

Opponents of the dam's removal cite that lowering the water level would not immediately be useful, and there are no cost or time estimates on how long it would take to convert the mud basin into usable land. There are also no studies that indicate a rising fish population should the dam be removed. The city council has been unable to agree upon an adequate plan for removing the dam. The reservoir also provides a slow-moving rowing environment, which is utilized as a practice course by the University of Michigan Men's Rowing Team and other high school teams. In 2010, the Michigan Department of Natural Resources gave permission for the city to keep the dam in place and allow for additional funding to improve the surrounding landscape. The dam was considered "safe and did not need repairs" itself, but continued maintenance would be necessary. The dam's good structural integrity also played a role in the decision to keep the dam.

== Activities ==
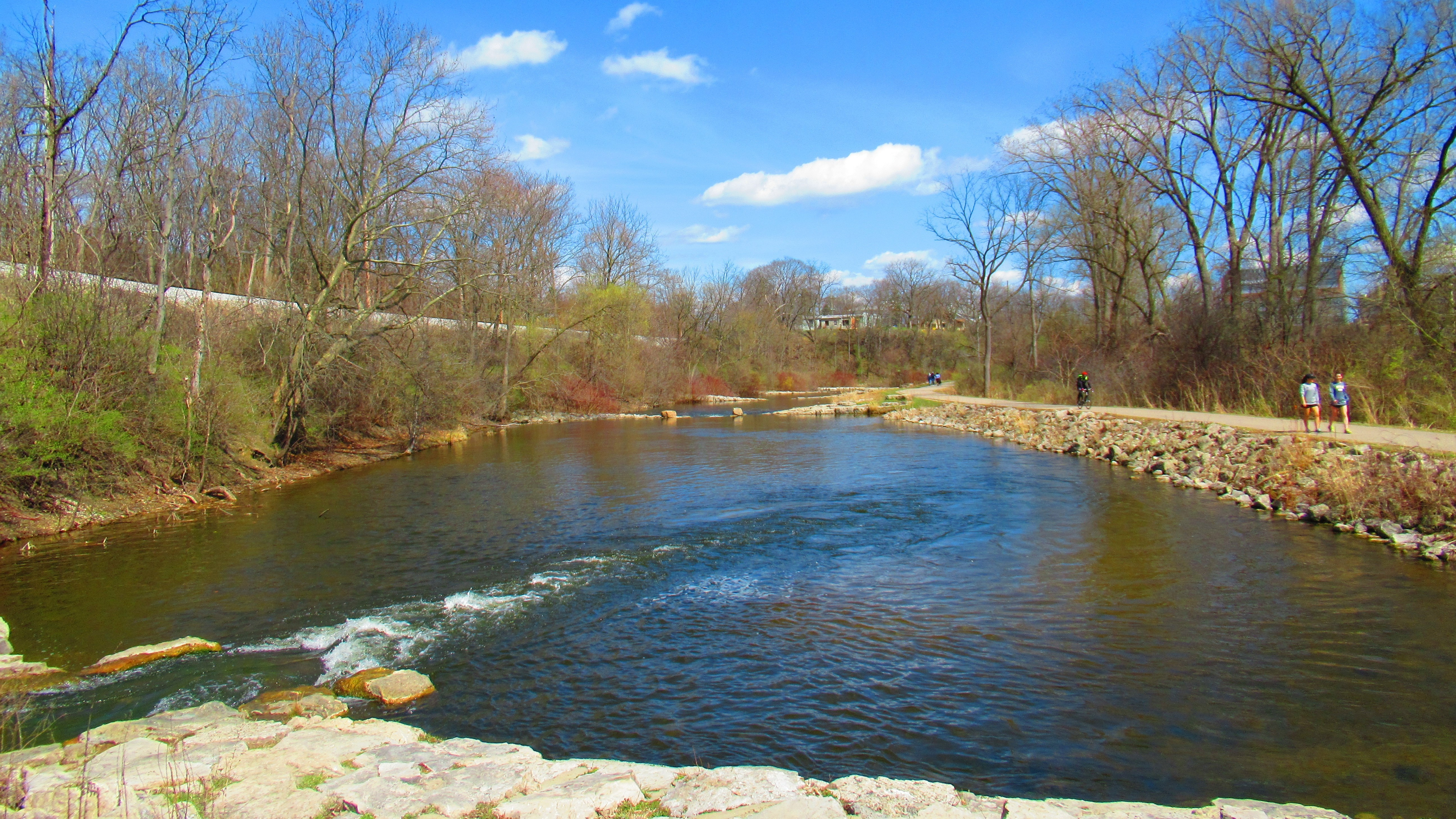
The artificial Argo Cascades allows kayakers to bypass the dam and continue along the Huron River.

The area surrounding the Argo Dam reservoir is owned by the city and encompasses two city parks. The Argo Nature Area occupies 22 acres (8.9 ha) along the entire eastern shores of the reservoir, and Bandemer Park occupies 36.9 acres (14.9 ha) along a portion of the western banks. Barton Nature Area is another city-owned park further upstream near the Barton Dam. The Border-to-Border Trail, which runs for 35 miles (56.3 km) from Dexter Township to Ypsilanti Township, passes directly across the Argo Dam and also provides public amenities.

The Argo Dam reservoir serves as a popular kayaking location along the Huron River. The city of Ann Arbor owns the Argo Pond Livery for kayak and canoe rentals. In 2012, the city completed a project to create the artificial Argo Cascades along the original route of the former hydroelectric plant, which forms an artificial island. The swift-moving waters descend 12 feet (3.7 m) over a length of 1,200 feet (365.8 m). The cascades allows kayakers to continue the course of the Huron River without needing to portage over the Argo Dam, although portaging is an option for those wishing to bypass the cascades.

When the Argo Dam was reconstructed in 1972, the river was treated with rotenone to eliminate all fish populations along this stretch of river. After the dam project was completed, the Argo Dam reservoir was restocked with various fish species, such as smallmouth bass, walleye, hybrid sunfish, and rainbow trout. Channel catfish were intermittently stocked throughout the following decades. Common carp, suckerfish, and longnose gar were also introduced in the area. Fish stocking was discontinued after 2000 due to poor survival and low angler use. The Argo Dam continues to serve as a recreational area for shore fishing in either the reservoir or the area immediately downstream along the Huron River. Common fish caught today within this area include channel catfish, bluegill, small and largemouth bass, black crappie, northern pike, and walleye.

=== Health concerns ===
The Huron River is occasionally issued a "Do Not Eat" fish advisory by the Michigan Department of Health and Human Services when the waters accumulate high levels of cyanobacteria and perfluorooctanesulfonatecan (PFOS). When this bacteria is present, prolonged contact with the water is not advised, although occasional contact with PFOS is not considered a health concern. When the advisory is in place, fishermen are advised to catch and release only, and warning signs are posted at river access points. The advisory is often issued for long stretches of the Huron River that include and specifically mention the Argo Dam portion of the river.
