= Geddes Dam =

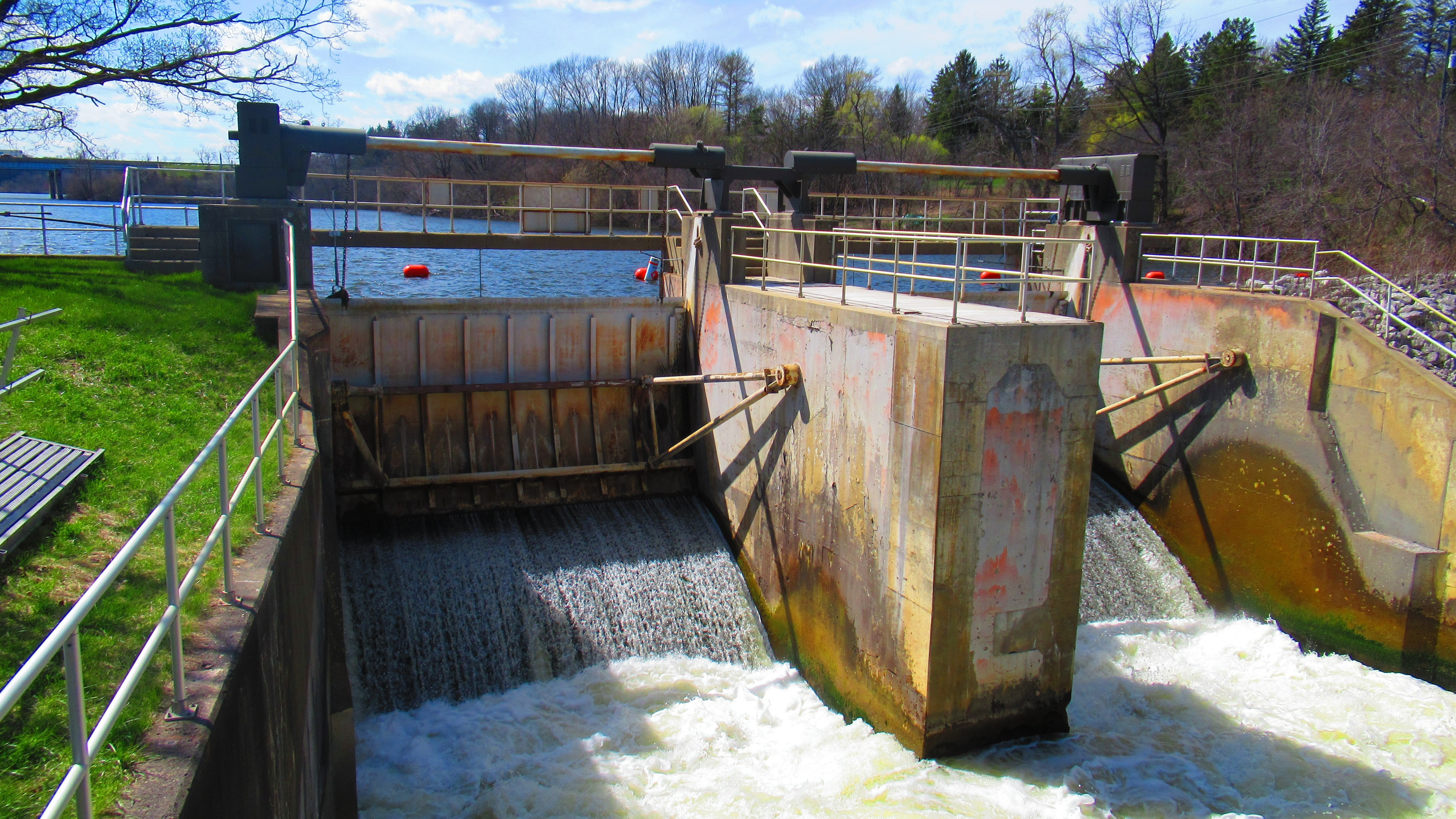
- North section of Geddes Dam in April 2020

- Location within the state of Michigan
- Location: Huron River; Ann Arbor Township, Michigan
- Coordinates: 42°16′15″N 83°40′17″W
- Purpose: Power
- Status: Decommissioned
- Opening date: 1919; 107 years ago
- Owner: City of Ann Arbor

Dam and spillways
- Type of dam: Barrage
- Impounds: Huron River
- Height: 28 feet (8.5 m)
- Length: 87 feet (26.5 m)
- Width (crest): 150 feet (45.7 m)
- Spillway capacity: 9,700 ft^{3}/s (275 m^{3}/s)

Reservoir
- Total capacity: 261 acres (105.6 ha)

The Geddes Dam is a decommissioned hydroelectric barrage dam crossing the Huron River. It is located in Ann Arbor Township in Washtenaw County in the U.S. state of Michigan. It was built by the Detroit Edison Company in 1919 for hydroelectricity before being decommissioned in 1959. The dam is currently owned by the nearby city of Ann Arbor. The surrounding area is used for recreational purposes, including Gallup Park, which is Ann Arbor's most popular recreational area.

== Description ==
The Geddes Dam is located in southeastern Ann Arbor Township about 0.25 miles (0.40 km) from the eastern city limits of Ann Arbor. U.S. Route 23 crosses the river slightly west of the dam, which forms the eastern boundary of Ann Arbor's city limits at this point. The Geddes Dam is approximately 45.5 miles (73.2 km) from the Huron River mouth at Lake Erie. The nearest dams are the Argo Dam 5.0 miles (8.0 km) upstream and the Superior Dam 2.5 miles (4.0 km) downstream. When the dam was completed, the resulting flooding created a reservoir of 261 acres (106 ha). The reservoir has no official name but is sometimes referred to as the Geddes Pond or Geddes Impoundment. It sits at an elevation of 747 feet (228 m) above sea level and has an average depth of 16.3 feet (5.0 m). The dam has a discharge capacity of 9,700 cubic feet per second (275 m^{3}/s).

The dam consists of two automated bays, each with two concrete spillways for a total dam length of 87 feet (26.5 m) and an entire crest length of 150 feet (45.7 m). The dam is 28 feet (8.5 m) tall.

The dam is one of four dams owned by the city of Ann Arbor. The other dams are the Argo Dam, Barton Dam, and Superior Dam. Only the Argo Dam and Barton Dam are actually within the city of Ann Arbor. Geddes Dam is within Ann Arbor Township, and Superior Dam is in neighboring Superior Township to the east.

== History ==
The first hydroelectric facility was built along this stretch of the Huron River in 1884. Property along the Huron River was purchased by the Detroit Edison Company in 1905 for the purpose of building a hydroelectric dam.

The dam was eventually built in 1919 as a series of hydroelectric dams built along the Huron River. The Geddes Dam was decommissioned in 1959 and no longer utilized for hydroelectric purposes. The dam was sold to the city of Ann Arbor in 1963. In 1968, the "heaviest storm in a generation" caused the Geddes Dam to fail, and increased water levels also severely damaged several downstream dams and caused considerable property damage. The dam was rebuilt in 1971–1972, in which new automated gates were installed to control the water level of the reservoir.

The Detroit Edison Company once operated four hydroelectric dams that served Ann Arbor: Argo Dam, Barton Dam, Geddes Dam, and Superior Dam. At one time, they were all decommissioned in the late-1950s, but Barton Dam and Superior Dam were recommissioned in the 1980s and currently provide hydroelectricity for Ann Arbor's power grid. Geddes Dam and Argo Dam were left decommissioned, because higher cost estimates and lower energy production kept them from being recommended for recommissioning.

In 2010, a plan was proposed by the U.S. Army Corps of Engineers to recommission the Argo and Geddes Dam in order to provide additional electric power to the nearby Ann Arbor VA Medical Center. A study found it would cost up to $14.7 million to construct new hydroelectric stations at both decommissioned dams. The transmission lines themselves would cost another $1.3 million, with at least $220,000 per year for maintenance. Funding was denied by the Ann Arbor City Council to go ahead with the project, but the proposal of completely removing the Geddes Dam was also not in financial consideration. In 2013, the city approved a financial plan to improve the surrounded areas of both Argo Dam and Geddes Dam at a cost of $295,530 to a local contractor. The dams received these significant improvements in 2014.

== Activities ==
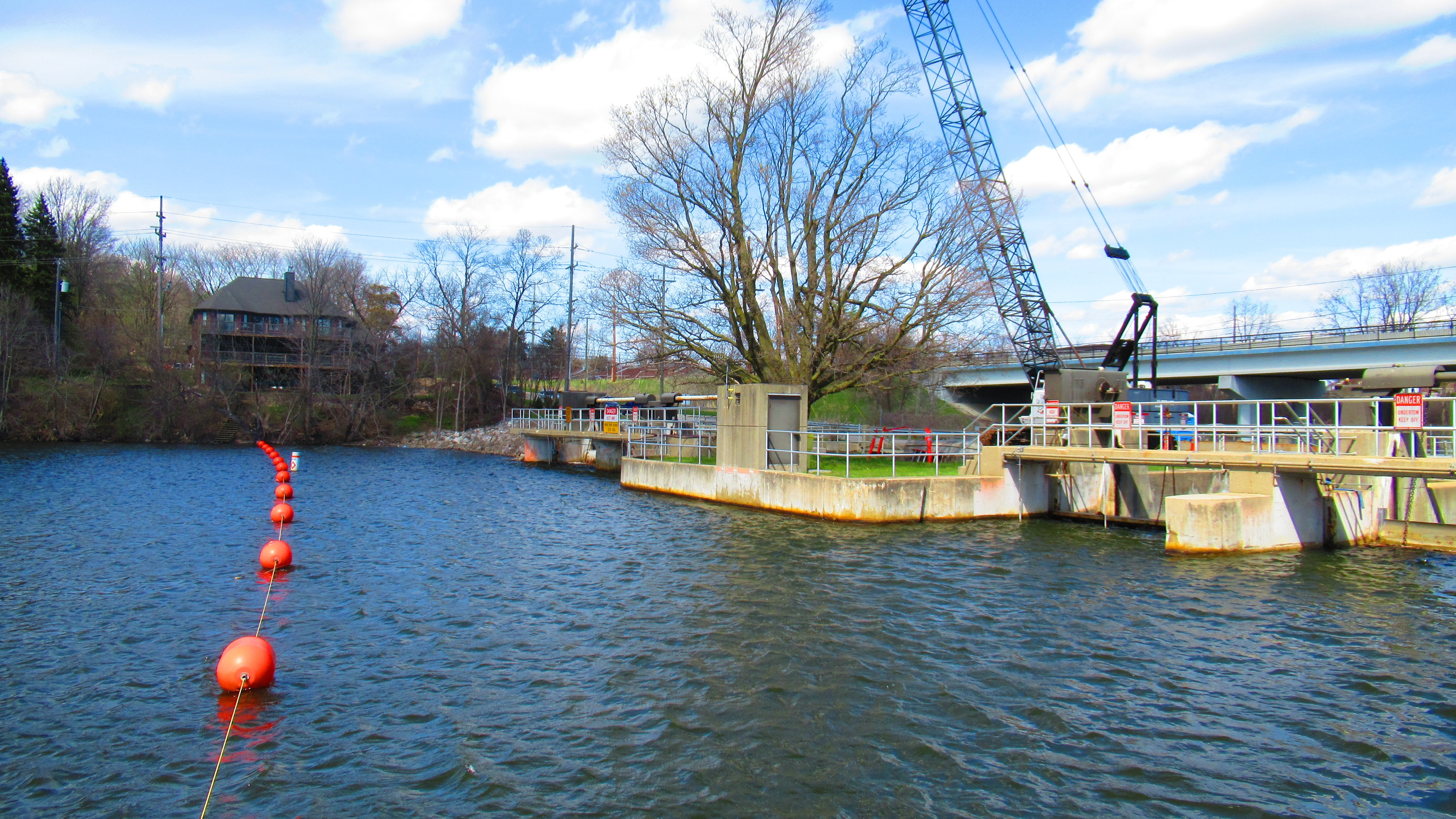
Reservoir side of the Geddes Dam

The Geddes Dam serves a recreational purposes for shore fishing in both the reservoir and the area immediately downstream along the Huron River. Common fish caught within this area include catfish (bullhead and channel), bluegill, small and largemouth bass, black crappie, northern pike, and walleye. At one time, tiger muskellunge were stocked by the Michigan Department of Natural Resources at the Geddes Dam reservoir, but the population did not materialize and was not replenished.

The Border-to-Border Trail, which runs for 35 miles (56.3 km) from Dexter Township to Ypsilanti Township, passes along the Geddes Dam and also provides public amenities. The area along the western edge of the reservoir is organized as Gallup Park, which is Ann Arbor's most popular recreation area. Gallup Park is located on both sides of the reservoir about 1 mile (1.61 km) upstream. The Michigan Department of Natural Resources maintains a small public boat launch at Gallup Park, which allows for access to the reservoir and Geddes Dam. Larger boats are restricted, as the reservoir is a no-wake zone, and canoes and kayaks that want to continue the path of the Huron River must portage over the dam.

=== Health concerns ===
The Huron River is occasionally issued a "Do Not Eat" fish advisory by the Michigan Department of Health and Human Services when the waters accumulate high levels of cyanobacteria and perfluorooctanesulfonatecan (PFOS). When this bacteria is present, prolonged contact with the water is not advised, although occasional contact with PFOS is not considered a health concern. When the advisory is in place, fishermen are advised to catch and release only, and warning signs are posted at river access points. The advisory is often issued for long stretches of the Huron River that include the Geddes Dam portion of the river.
