= Superior Dam =

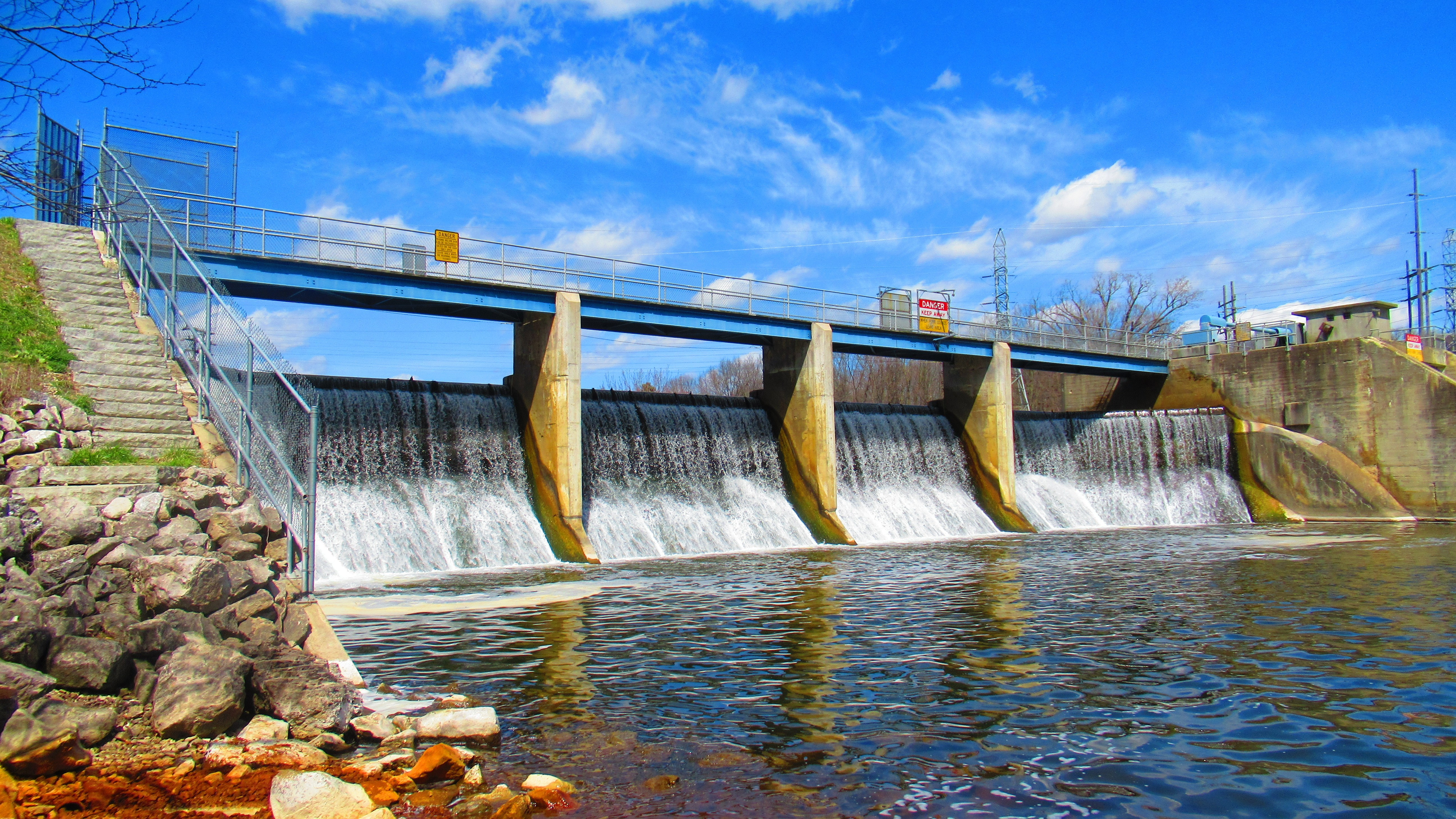
- Superior Dam in April 2020

- Location within the state of Michigan
- Location: Huron River; Superior Township, Michigan
- Coordinates: 42°15′56″N 83°38′40″W
- Purpose: Power
- Status: Operational
- Opening date: 1920; 106 years ago
- Owner: City of Ann Arbor

Dam and spillways
- Type of dam: Barrage
- Impounds: Huron River
- Height: 27.5 feet (8.4 m)
- Length: 160 feet (48.8 m)
- Width (crest): 330 feet (100.6 m)
- Spillway capacity: 17,200 ft^{3}/s (487 m^{3}/s)

Reservoir
- Total capacity: 93 acres (37.6 ha)

The Superior Dam is a hydroelectric barrage dam crossing the Huron River. It is located in Superior Township in Washtenaw County in the U.S. state of Michigan. It was completed in 1920 and currently provides hydroelectricity to the nearby city of Ann Arbor, which owns and maintains the dam and power station.

== Description ==
The Superior Dam is located in southwestern Superior Township about 1.5 miles (2.4 km) from the city of Ann Arbor. The Superior Dam is approximately 43 miles (69 km) from the Huron River mouth at Lake Erie. The Geddes Dam is 2.5 miles (4.0 km) upstream, and the Peninsular Paper Dam is 1.5 miles (2.4 km) downstream. When the dam was completed, the resulting flooding created a reservoir of 93 acres (38 ha). The reservoir has no official name but is sometimes referred to as the Superior Pond or Superior Impoundment. It sits at an elevation of 730 feet (220 m) above sea level and has an average depth of 22.4 feet (6.8 m). The river narrows at this point, and the dam has a discharge capacity of 17,200 cubic feet per second (487 m^{3}/s).

The reservoir and the downstream portion of the dam are accessible to the public via nature trails maintained by the nearby Ann Arbor campus of St. Joseph Mercy Hospital, including access to a canoe portage on the west side of the dam. However, the dam itself in not open to the public. The powerhouse and a substation connecting the dam to the grid are located on the east side of the dam, accessible to authorized personnel by a catwalk.

The dam is one of four dams owned by the city of Ann Arbor. The other dams are the Geddes Dam, Argo Dam, and Barton Dam. Only Argo Dam and Barton Dam are actually within the city of Ann Arbor. Geddes Dam is within Ann Arbor Township.

== Hydroelectricity ==
The Superior Station Hydroelectric Plant was constructed alongside the dam in 1920. The facility was built by The Detroit Edison Company. The generating station only provides a very small portion of Ann Arbor's energy supply. In 1957, the four plants supplied 38 GWh of electricity, just under 6% of the city's energy usage for the year. Most other energy sources came from near Detroit. The Detroit Edison Company decommissioned the site in 1963 and sold it to the city of Ann Arbor. The city restored the facility and put it back into service in 1986. Soon after, the city entered into a 50-year contract to sell the energy back to the Detroit Edison Company.

Today, only the Superior Dam and Barton Dam have active hydroelectric facilities serving Ann Arbor. Combined, the two dams produce 6 GWh of electricity annually. There are currently four active hydroelectric dams along the Huron River: Barton, Superior, Ford Lake, and French Landing.

In a report published by the Huron River Watershed Council in 2019, they noted that the dam "does not generate enough electricity to cover its own annual maintenance and operating costs." Studies are being conducted on the feasibility of removing the dam—a fate that has already been determined for the decommissioned Peninsular Paper Dam 1.5 miles (2.4 km) downstream.

== Activities ==
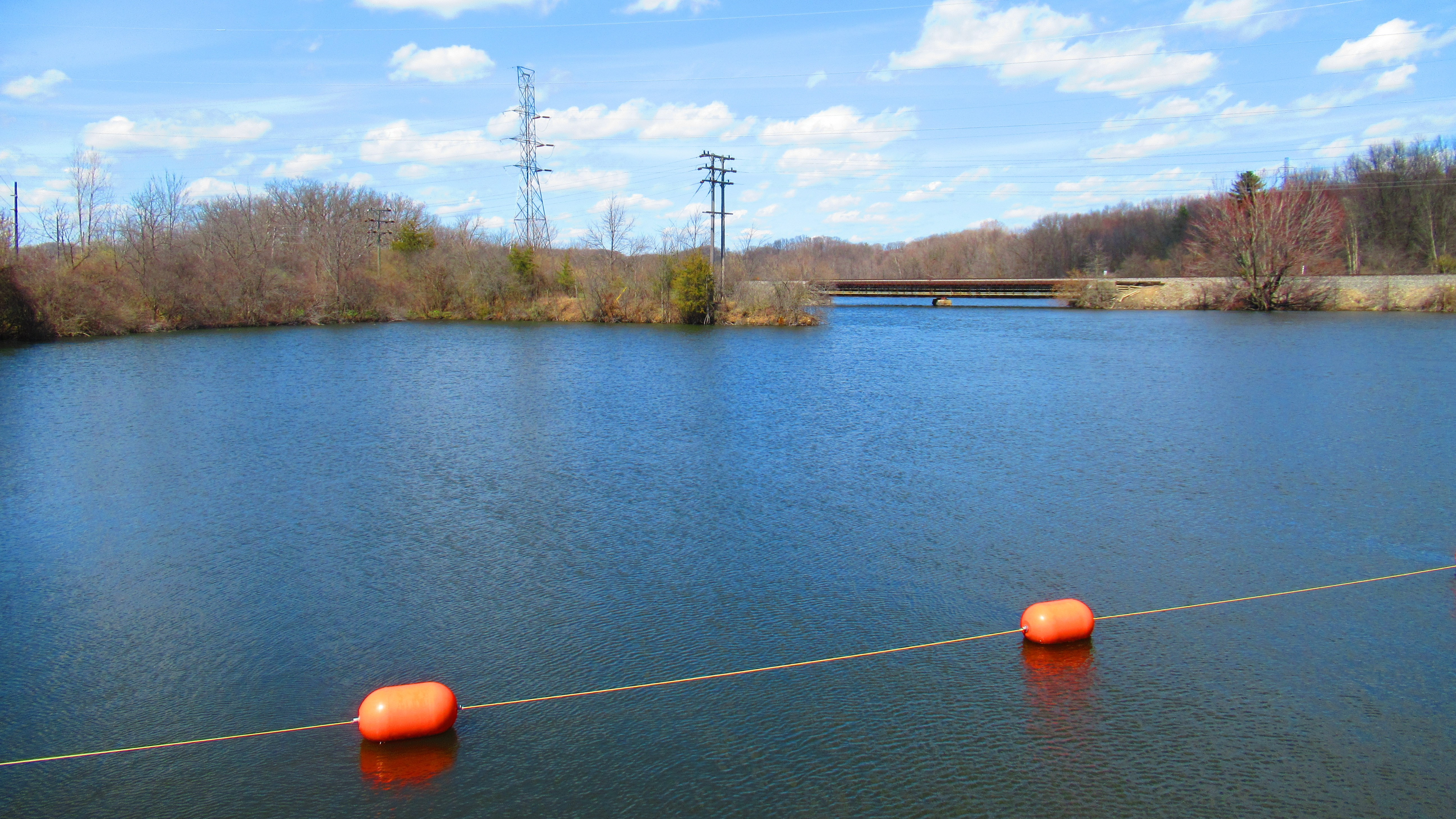
The Superior Dam reservoir

=== Access ===
The surrounding area is mostly undeveloped. There is not dedicated parking, nor a launch, and carrying a canoe or kayak to the site from the nature trail parking lot is impractical.

=== Rowing and kayaking ===
The reservoir lacks direct road access. Rowing conditions on this stretch of the river are not ideal, especially with very low bridge clearances and a lack of public amenities.

However it is located along the Huron River Water Trail, mapped by the Huron–Clinton Metroparks. This water trail consists of informational signage and facilities for kayakers paddling along the river. The aforementioned portage is part of the water trail.

=== Trails ===
While the city of Ann Arbor owns the dam, much of the surrounding area is owned by the Saint Joseph Mercy Hospital, which maintains it as a nature area with trails. These trails wind through a diverse range of wetland and forest ecosystems, providing, along with pedestrian access to the dam canoe portage, scenic views of the river valley.

=== Fishing ===
The Saint Joseph nature trails allow dam and reservoir access on the western bank, allowing access for anglers. Common fish caught along this stretch of the river include small and largemouth bass, sunfish, rock bass, northern pike, crappie, and carp.

=== Health concerns ===
The Huron River is occasionally issued a "do not eat" fish advisory by the Michigan Department of Health and Human Services when the waters accumulate high levels of cyanobacteria and perfluorooctanesulfonatecan (PFOS). When this bacteria is present, prolonged contact with the water is not advised, although occasional contact with PFOS is not considered a health concern. When the advisory is in place, fishermen are advised to catch and release only, and warning signs are posted at river access points. While the Superior Dam and its reservoir are not specifically mentioned, the advisory is often issued for long stretches of the Huron River that include the Superior Dam portion of the river.
