= Parker Mill =

Historic mill and park in Ann Arbor Charter Township, Michigan

Parker Mill County Park
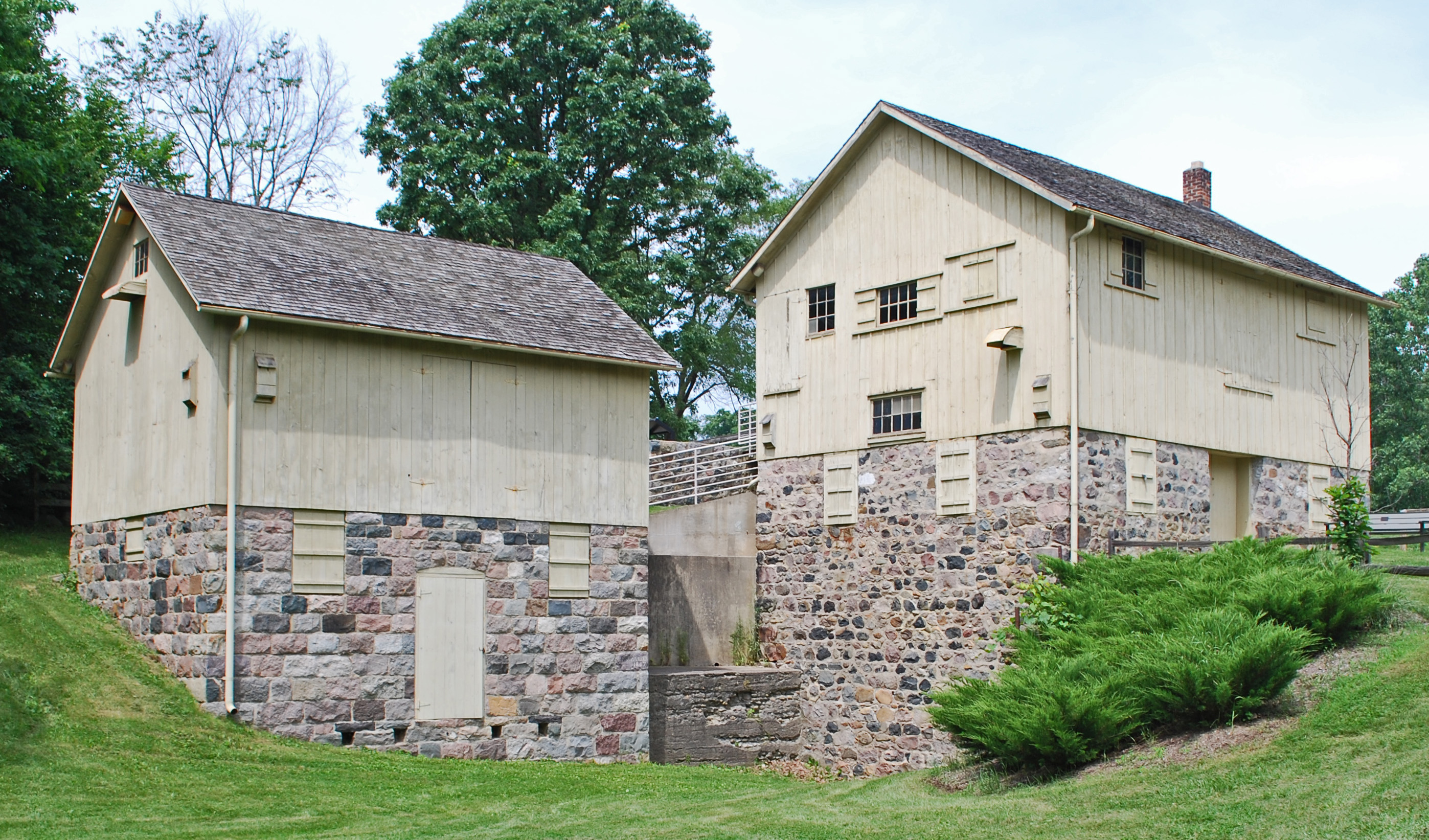
- Historic grist and cider mills
- Interactive map of Parker Mill County Park
- Location: Ann Arbor Charter Township, Michigan
- Coordinates: 42°16′26″N 83°40′7″W
- Operator: Washtenaw County
- Parker Mill Complex
- U.S. National Register of Historic Places
- Location within Michigan Location within the United States
- Area: 11 acres (4.5 ha)
- Built: 1873
- Built by: William Parker
- Architectural style: Italianate, Log construction
- NRHP reference No.: 82002888
- Added to NRHP: August 4, 1982

The Parker Mill, also known as Parker Mill County Park or Parker Mill Complex, is a historic mill and park in Ann Arbor Charter Township, Michigan. The mill is a well-preserved example of a small-scale grist mill operation that was once common in Michigan. The mill and nearby Parker House (located at 4540 Geddes Road) were listed on the National Register of Historic Places in 1982.

The mill and the surrounding land are managed as a public park, operated by the Washtenaw County Parks and Recreation Commission. Parker Mill County Park and the adjacent Forest Nature Area form a 45-acre (18 ha) wooded area, which includes hiking trails and a boardwalk.

== History ==
On this site in 1824, Robert Fleming built a sawmill, located on a rise above the creek which now bears his name. The mill, known as the "Fleming Sawmill," was eventually abandoned and fell into disrepair. In 1863, English immigrant William Q. Parker and his wife Mary purchased the site and 61 acres of the surrounding farmland. In 1873, Parker built the current grist mill on the site of the previous sawmill, which had "long since gone to ruin." At around the same time built a cabin for mill workers to stay in. In 1887, he constructed the nearby cider mill. The Parkers initially ground flour for their own use and that of their neighbors. They also pressed their own cider, but an apple blight in the early 1900s caused the use of the cider mill to be discontinued after 1914.

In 1910, William Parker died, and his son George took over operation of the mill. George began selling products to the local markets in Ann Arbor under the brand "Flemings Creek Mills," and soon the mill became well known locally for its pancake mix, whole wheat flour, and buckwheat flour. In the 1920s, Geddes Road was widened and paved, and the Parkers raised the foundation of the grist mill. George Parker died in 1956, and commercial operations at the grist mill ceased. George's son Dale kept milling for personal use, but mill operations ceased entirely in 1959.

Soon afterward, the farm and mill were acquired by the Matthei family. At some point in the 1960s, the original dam was washed away. In 1983, Frederick Matthei sold 26 acres around the mill site, including both mills and the cabin, to the Washtenaw County Parks and Recreation Commission for $165,000, well under the market value). The family retained the Parker House as a private residence.

Washtenaw County restored the mill and opened the site as a park in 1984. The park has expanded since its opening, with the creation of new trails and the installation of further amenities.

== Description ==
The Parker Mill Complex consists of two mills (a grist mill and cider mill) along with a log mill-worker's house, the Parker farmhouse, and various outbuildings.

The 1873 grist mill is a three-story structure set into the hill near Fleming Creek. The mill has a frame third floor, clad with board and batten siding, set atop a two-story stone foundation. The mill still contains the original milling machinery, which is in operable condition.

The 1887 cider mill, located adjacent to the grist mill, is a two-story structure, with a gabled frame second story atop an ashlar first floor foundation. The cider mill is now used as a small museum.

The mill-worker's house is a log cabin located behind the mills.

The Parker house is located west of the mill site along Geddes Road. It is a masonry Italianate structure with a hip roof. The house is not part of the Parker Mill Park.

== Gallery ==
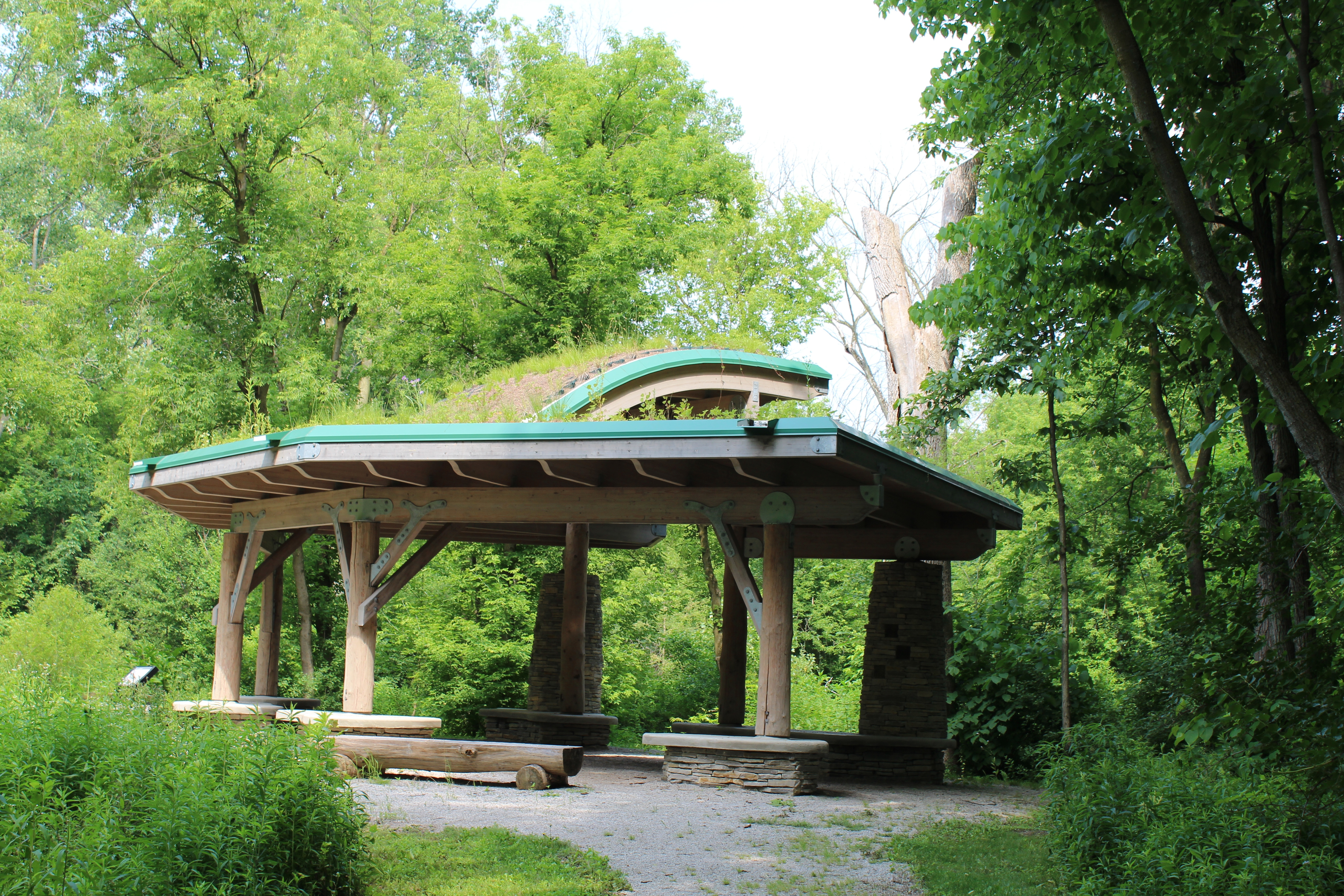
Green-roof pavilion

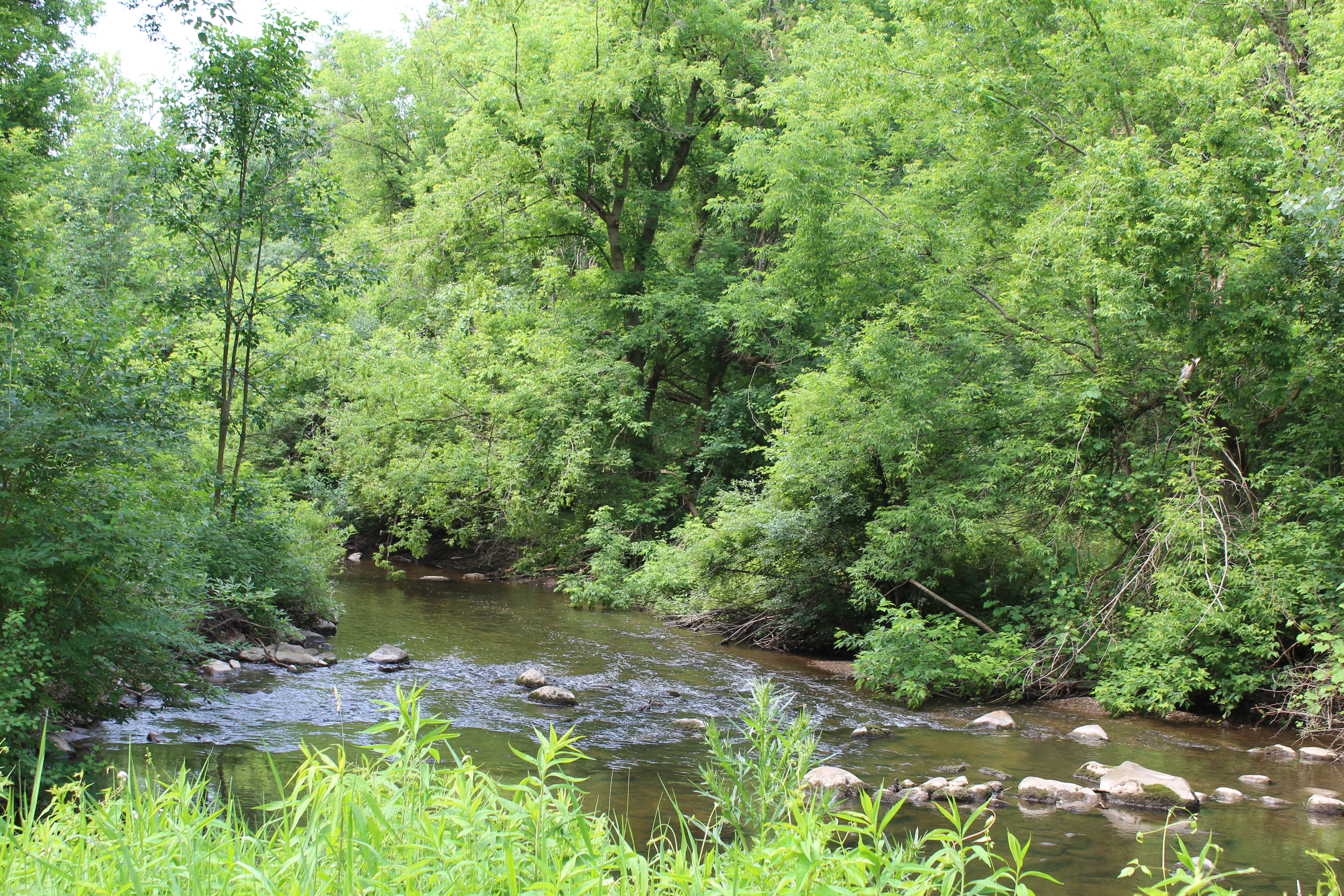
View of Fleming Creek in summer

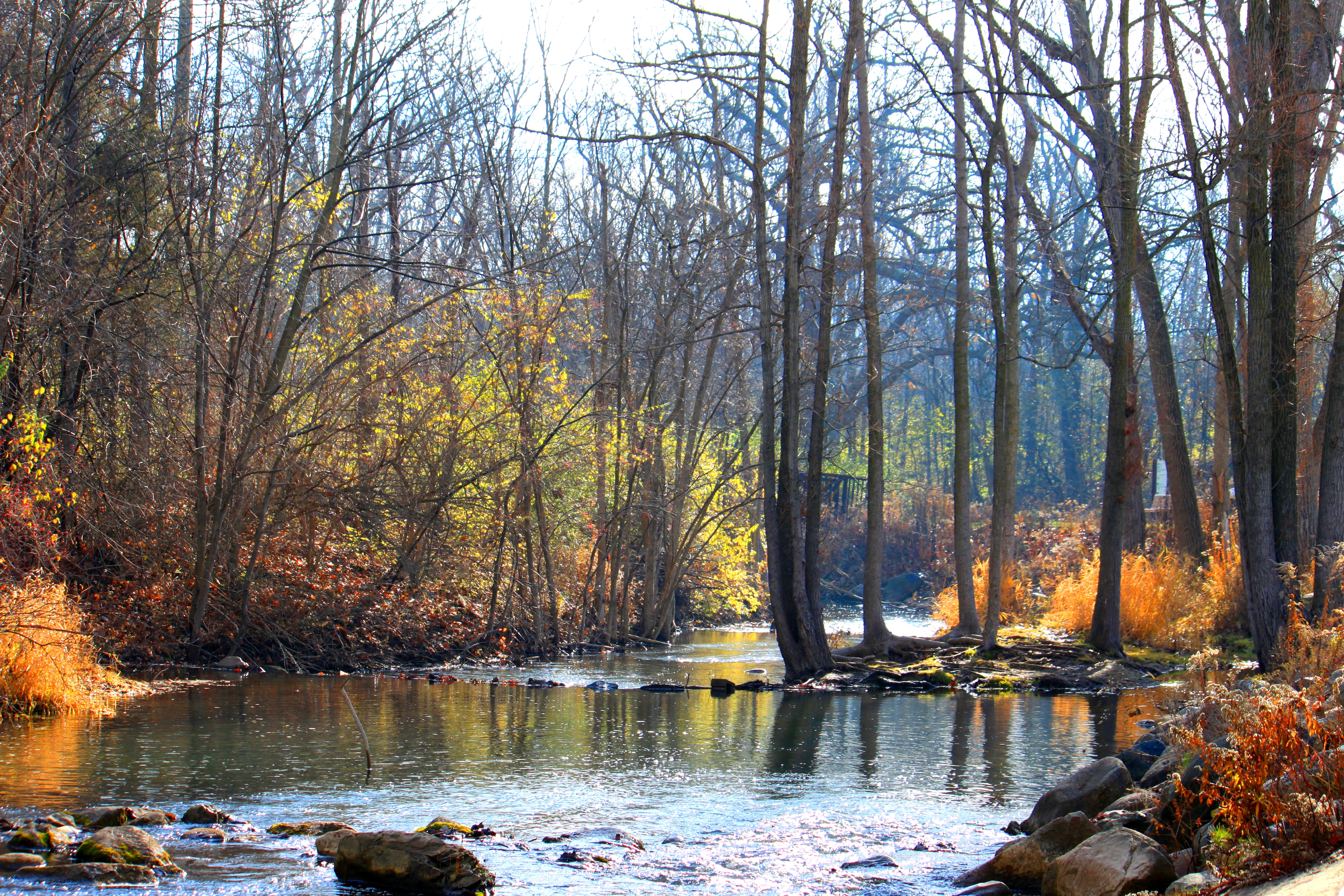
Fleming Creek in fall

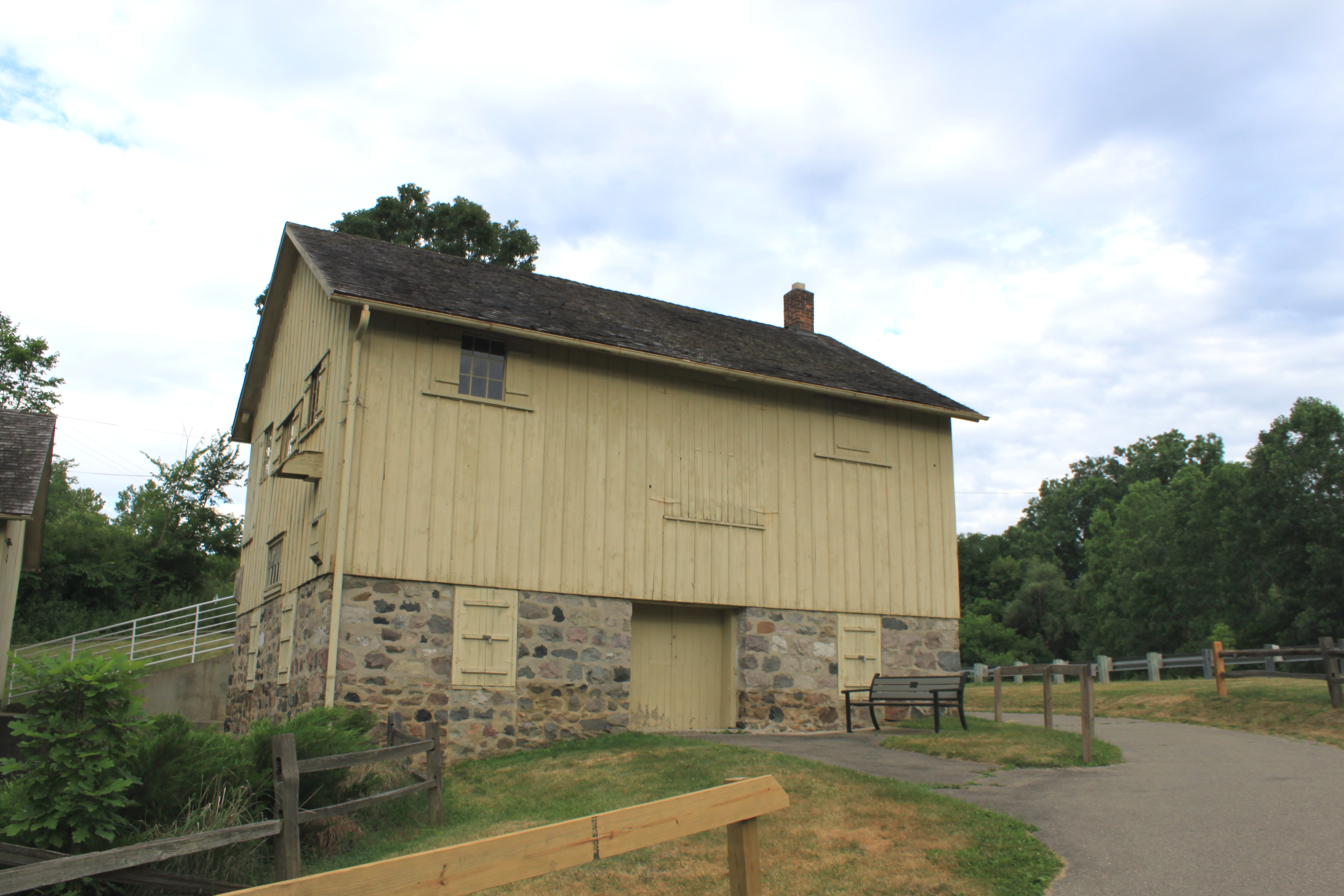
Close view of the grist mill
