= Barton Dam =

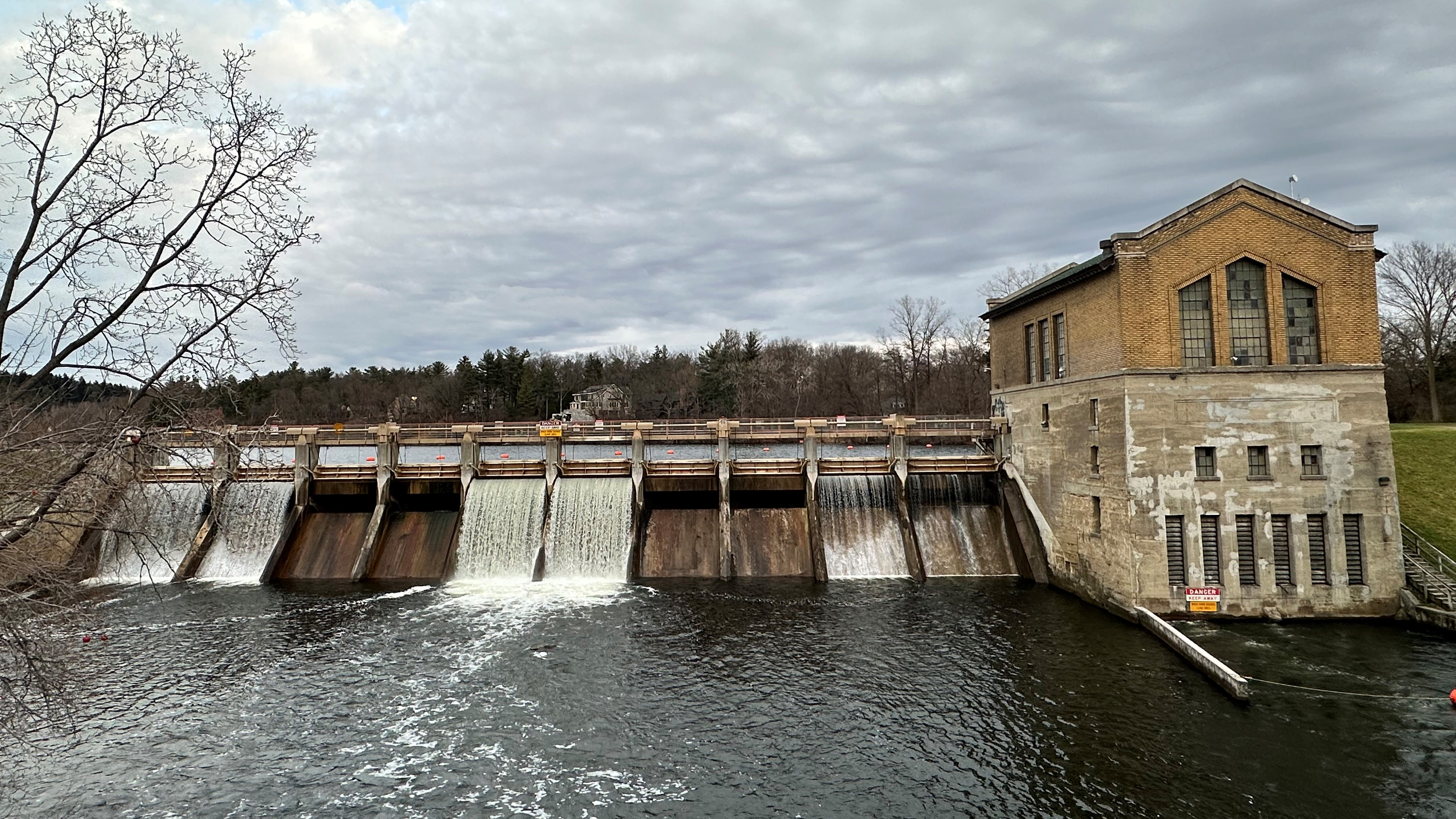
- Barton Dam in December 2023

- Location within the state of Michigan
- Location: Huron River; Ann Arbor, Michigan
- Coordinates: 42°18′30″N 83°45′16″W
- Purpose: Power
- Status: Operational
- Opening date: 1912; 114 years ago
- Owner: City of Ann Arbor

Dam and spillways
- Type of dam: Barrage
- Impounds: Huron River
- Height: 30 feet (9.1 m)
- Length: 175 feet (53.3 m)
- Width (crest): 1,560 feet (475.5 m)
- Spillway capacity: 15,100 ft^{3}/s (427.6 m^{3}/s)

Reservoir
- Creates: Barton Pond
- Total capacity: 302 acres (122.2 ha)

The Barton Dam is a hydroelectric barrage dam crossing the Huron River. It is located in the city of Ann Arbor in Washtenaw County in the U.S. state of Michigan. It began operating in 1912 and currently provides hydroelectricity to city of Ann Arbor, which owns and maintains the dam and power station.

== Description ==
The Barton Dam is located in the northwestern city limits of Ann Arbor about 0.5 miles (0.80 km) west of M-14 (Bus. US 23) and just south of the village of Barton Hills. The dam is accessible just west of the highway via exit 3 (North Main Street) or exit 4 (Barton Drive) on the northside of the river. The Barton Dam is approximately 52.7 miles (84.8 km) from the Huron River mouth at Lake Erie. The nearest dams are the Flook Dam 16.3 miles (26.2 km) upstream in Dexter Township and the Argo Dam 2.1 miles (3.4 km) downstream within the city of Ann Arbor.

When the dam was completed, the resulting flooding created a reservoir of 302 acres (122 ha), and it is most commonly referred to as Barton Pond or sometimes as the Barton Impoundment. The reservoir sits at an elevation of approximately 797 feet (243 m) above sea level and has an average depth of 21.1 feet (6.4 m). The reservoir provides up to 80 percent of the drinking water for the city of Ann Arbor.

The dam is constructed out of concrete and consists of 10 automated spillways that control the water level of Barton Pond and the downstream area. The dam has a total length of 175 feet (53.3 m), and the crest length including the earthen levee is 1,560 feet (475.5 m) long. The dam is 30 feet (9.1 m) tall and has a discharge capacity of 15,100 cubic feet per second (427.6 m^{3}/s).

The dam is one of four dams owned by the city of Ann Arbor. The other dams are the Argo Dam, Geddes Dam, and Superior Dam. Only the Argo Dam and Barton Dam are actually within the city of Ann Arbor. Geddes Dam is within Ann Arbor Township, and Superior Dam is in neighboring Superior Township to the east.

== Hydroelectricity ==
The Barton Dam Hydroelectric Station was built alongside the dam beginning in 1912. The power station was built by the Detroit Edison Company. It was one of a series of dams constructed along the Huron River to provide hydroelectricity to residents and its own manufacturing facilities. The Detroit Edison Company decommissioned the site in 1963 and sold it to the city of Ann Arbor. The electricity generated by the power station was too low and not cost effective, and the power station was shut down. In 1986, the city determined that it would be feasible to restore hydroelectric power to Barton Dam, and in 1988, the city entered into a 50-year contract to sell the energy back to the Detroit Edison Company to supply electricity for Ann Arbor's power grid.

While there were numerous hydroelectric dams along the Huron River in the past, only the Barton Dam and Superior Dam remain active power stations serving Ann Arbor. Combined, the two dams produce 6,000 megawatt hours of power annually, which creates enough electricity for around 1,500 homes at peak capacity. Of the two facilities, the Barton Dam has a much larger generating capacity of about 4,200 megawatt hours of energy and earns the city more than $300,000 in revenue a year, not including general maintenance costs.

While the Barton Dam power station remains profitable, the Superior Dam power station "does not generate enough electricity to cover its own annual maintenance and operating costs" according to the Huron River Watershed Council in 2019 and risks being decommissioned. There are currently four remaining hydroelectric dams along the Huron River: Barton, Superior, Ford Lake, and French Landing.

== History ==
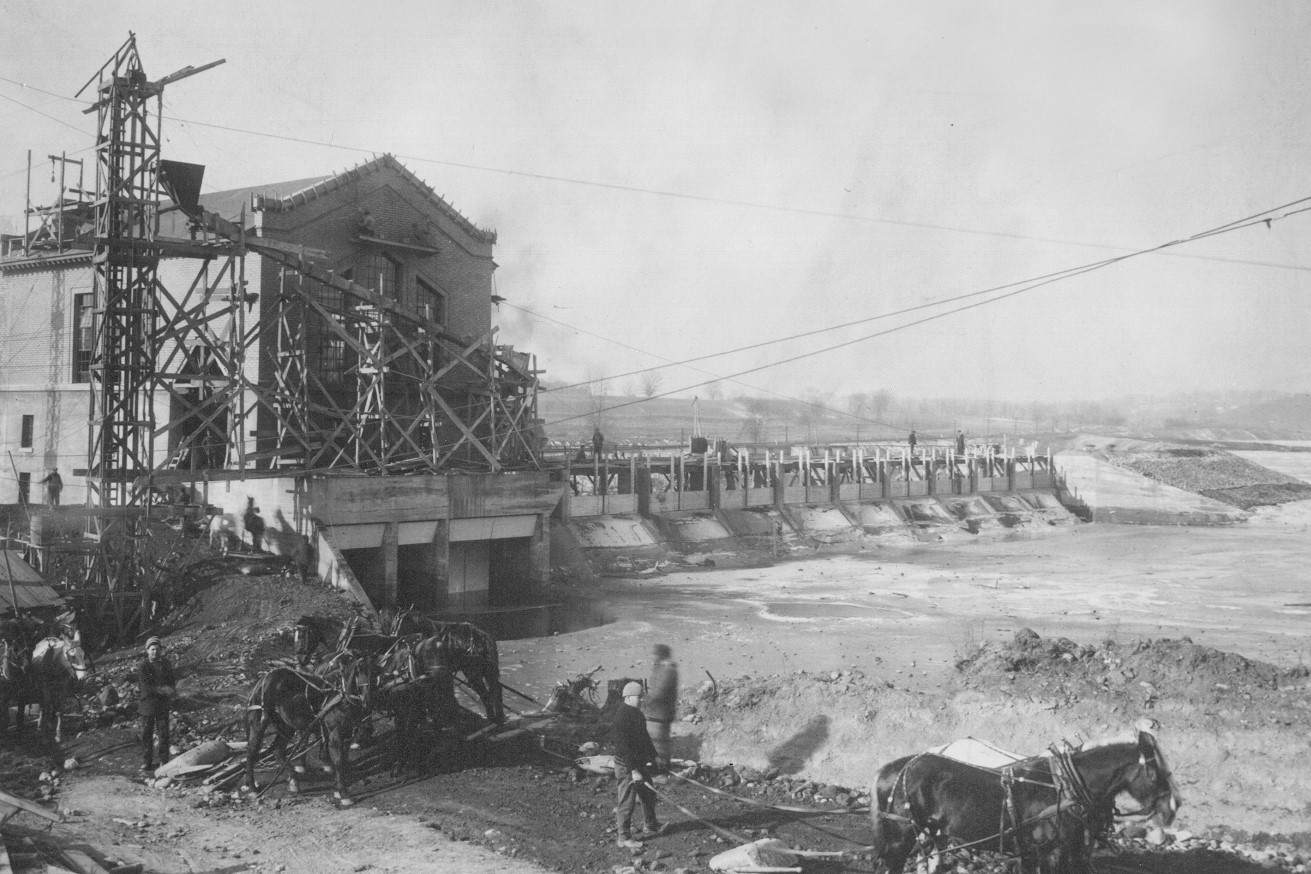
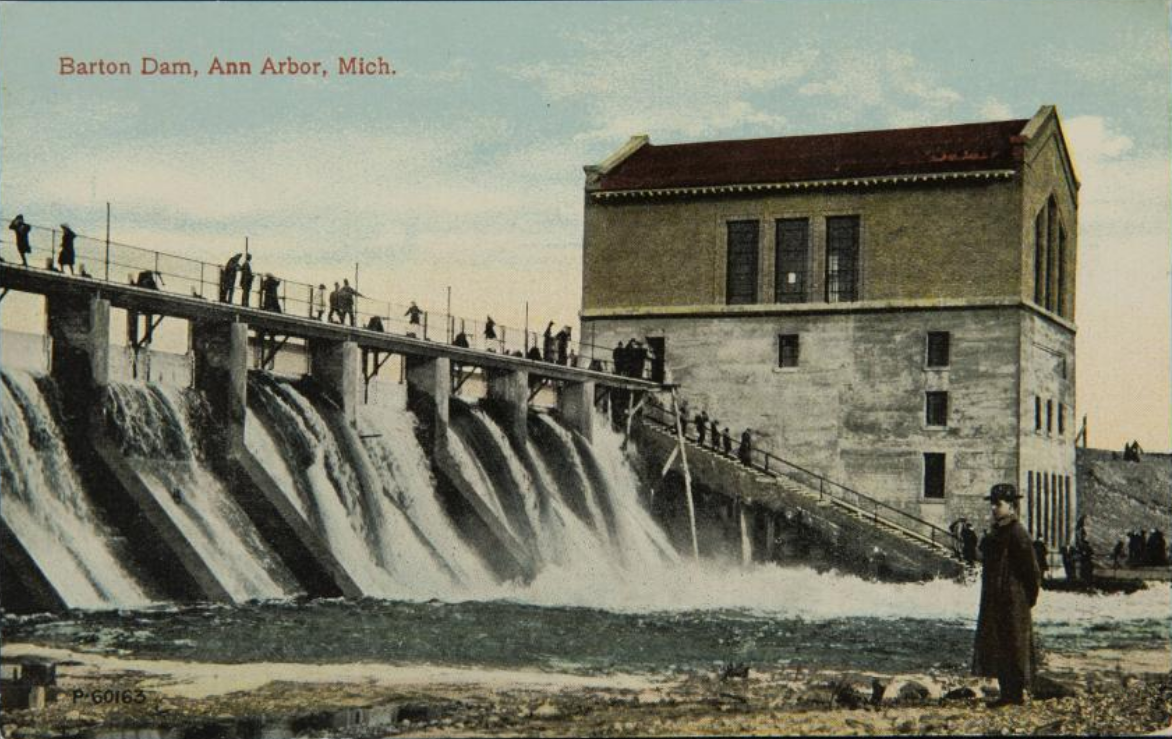
Early construction of the Barton Dam upstream (top) and downstream (bottom)

This portion of the Huron River was well known for its sharp decrease in elevation. Prior to damming, the river dropped 42 feet (13 m) within the city of Ann Arbor. While it had potential for early sawmills and later hydroelectricity, it made navigating the river impossible. In 1905, the Detroit Edison Company began purchasing riverfront land and water rights in order to dam the river in many locations. In 1912, construction began on the Barton Dam at a sharp bend in the river. The dam was able to open for the first time in December of that year, and the powerhouse was also activated. Construction on the dam continued for three more years. At 25 feet (7.6 m) tall, it was the tallest dam on the river at the time. Because of the dam's size and major geological changes to the surrounding area, the Detroit Edison Company was required to purchase large tracts of farming land not necessarily used for the dam or powerhouse.

Tragedy befell the Barton Dam during its early construction phase. Four college students canoed down the Huron River just upstream from the Barton Dam on March 19, 1913. When it came time to portage over the dam to the downstream area, they decided to use the staircase alongside the powerhouse rather than a nearby embankment. It was too dark to see the turbulent waters at the base of the dam. When they launched their canoe, the swift waters from the turbines pulled them back into the powerhouse and crashed against a wall. They were trapped on a ledge in neck-high frigid water and unable to escape due to the swiftness of the water pushing them back against the wall. One of the men tried to swim out and disappeared. Four hours later, plant operator Walter Yost discovered them trapped below. Yost tossed a rope down but was only able to save one person, as the other two fell and disappeared. Despite a massive search effort, it took a month to recover the three victims, who were found far from the dam within the river. As a result of the accident, the staircase along the side of the dam was closed, and better portage sites were constructed along the embankment.

By 1915, the dam was fully completed, and the reservoir was filled to capacity. By 1925, the hydroelectric power station was running at full capacity. Many workers for the Detroit Edison Company built their homes along the banks of the Huron River in what was former farmland just north of the city of Ann Arbor. A company-owned community grew along the riverfront near the Barton Dam. Riverfront property along the Barton Pond became very valuable estate, and many wealthy executives of the company built elaborate homes there. When the property became too expensive to maintain and had no economic use, the company began selling parcels of land by the 1940s. The community would later become the village of Barton Hills after the land was sold by the company, and some of these early homes still exist within the affluent village, which remains one of the wealthiest communities in the state. In 1959, the Detroit Edison Company also sold large plots of riverfront land back to the city of Ann Arbor, greatly increasing the city limits into a more rural area. In 1963, the Barton Dam and its powerhouse were sold to the city.

In 2011, a survey by the city found that the dam was in need of urgent concrete repairs at a cost of $1.15 million. In 2013, a new earthen berm (called a "drainage blanket") was needed at the base of the dam to facilitate drainage. This project cost almost $124,000. In 2019, the city of Ann Arbor approved a $543,000 contract to repair and upgrade the aging turbine and power station, which requires such maintenance at least every 10 years but had not been completed since 2005. An additional $190,000 was also needed for other repairs to the facility. Despite the costs, the facility returned to profitability within three years.

== Activities ==
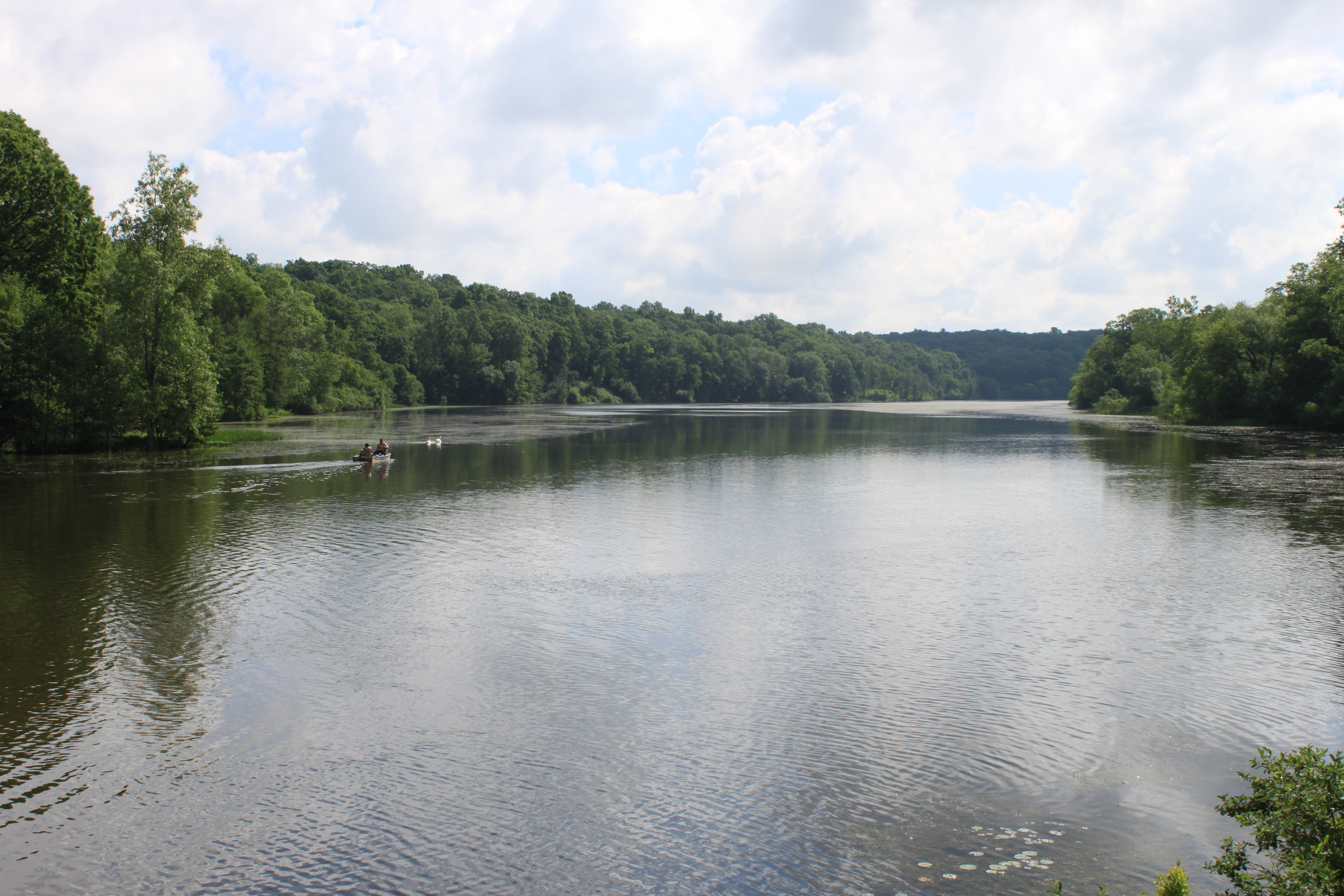
Barton Pond reservoir

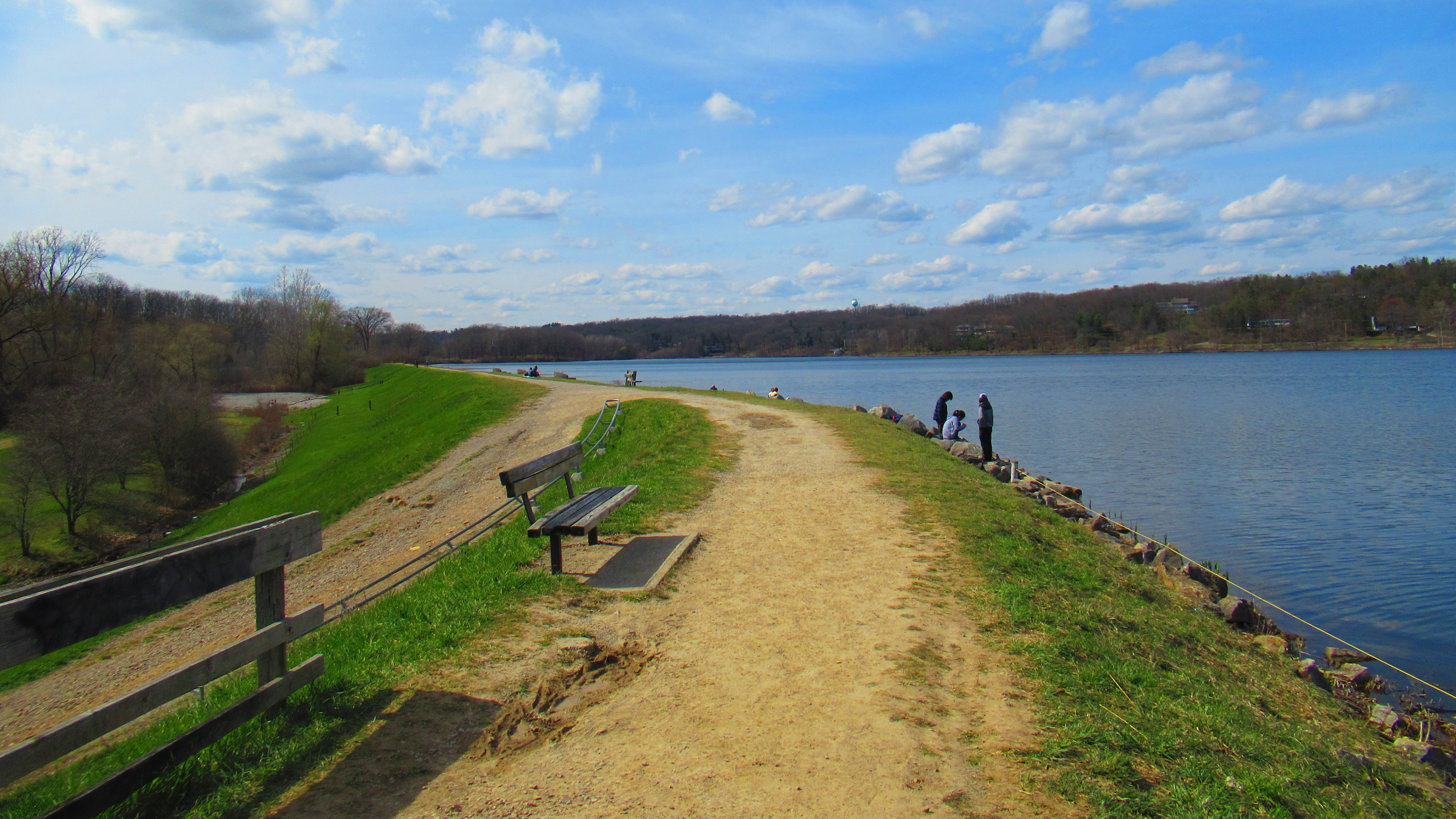
The levee overlooking Barton Pond

The area surrounding the southside of the dam and Huron River is owned by the city of Ann Arbor, while the northside is undeveloped and owned by the village of Barton Hills and Ann Arbor Township. The Ann Arbor portion is organized into the Barton Nature Area, which encompasses 98 acres (39.7 ha) along the Huron River on land previously owned by the Detroit Edison Company.

Bicycling is also a viable activity along the river. The Border-to-Border Trail crosses through Barton Nature Area along the dam but does not cross the dam itself. There are several small bridges downstream across the river for hiking and biking through the area. The park is also part of the Huron River Water Trail and contains 3.4 miles (5.5 km) of natural hiking trails along the river, which also has a pedestrian walkway going across the dam. There are two public access points to the river but are only usable for carrying kayaks and small canoes. One launch is located directly at the base of the dam, while the other is much further upstream near the beginning of Barton Pond.

Canoeing and kayaking are one of the more popular activities along this stretch of the Huron River. As the Flook Dam is 16 miles (25.7 km) upstream, this stretch of the river leading to the Barton Dam is one of the longest unobstructed paths along the Huron River. To continue along the river, boaters must portage over the Barton Dam across the embankment. In 2015, a steel railing was installed over the steep embankment to assist in the process, and new signage was also installed.

The Barton Pond was used by the Michigan Department of Natural Resources for stocking several varieties of fish, including channel catfish, largemouth bass, and even tiger muskellunge. However, low fish populations halted these stocking efforts in the future. Fishing remains a popular activity within the pond and downstream area. Common fish caught today within this area include black crappie, bluegill, channel catfish, northern pike, rock bass, smallmouth bass, sunfish, walleye, and yellow perch. Invasive zebra mussels have also been detected in Barton Pond. The Barton Pond contains several listings on the state's Master Angler Entries, with the largest being a common carp at 32.0 inches (81.3 cm) long and a channel catfish listed at 31.0 inches (78.7 cm) long.

=== Health concerns ===
The Huron River is occasionally issued a "Do Not Eat" fish advisory by the Michigan Department of Health and Human Services when the waters accumulate high levels of cyanobacteria and perfluorooctanesulfonatecan (PFOS). When this bacteria is present, prolonged contact with the water is not advised, although occasional contact with PFOS is not considered a health concern. When the advisory is in place, fishermen are advised to catch and release only, and warning signs are posted at river access points. The advisory is often issued for long stretches of the Huron River that include and specifically mention the Barton Dam portion of the river.
