= Bank fishing =

Angling from land edge along a waterbody

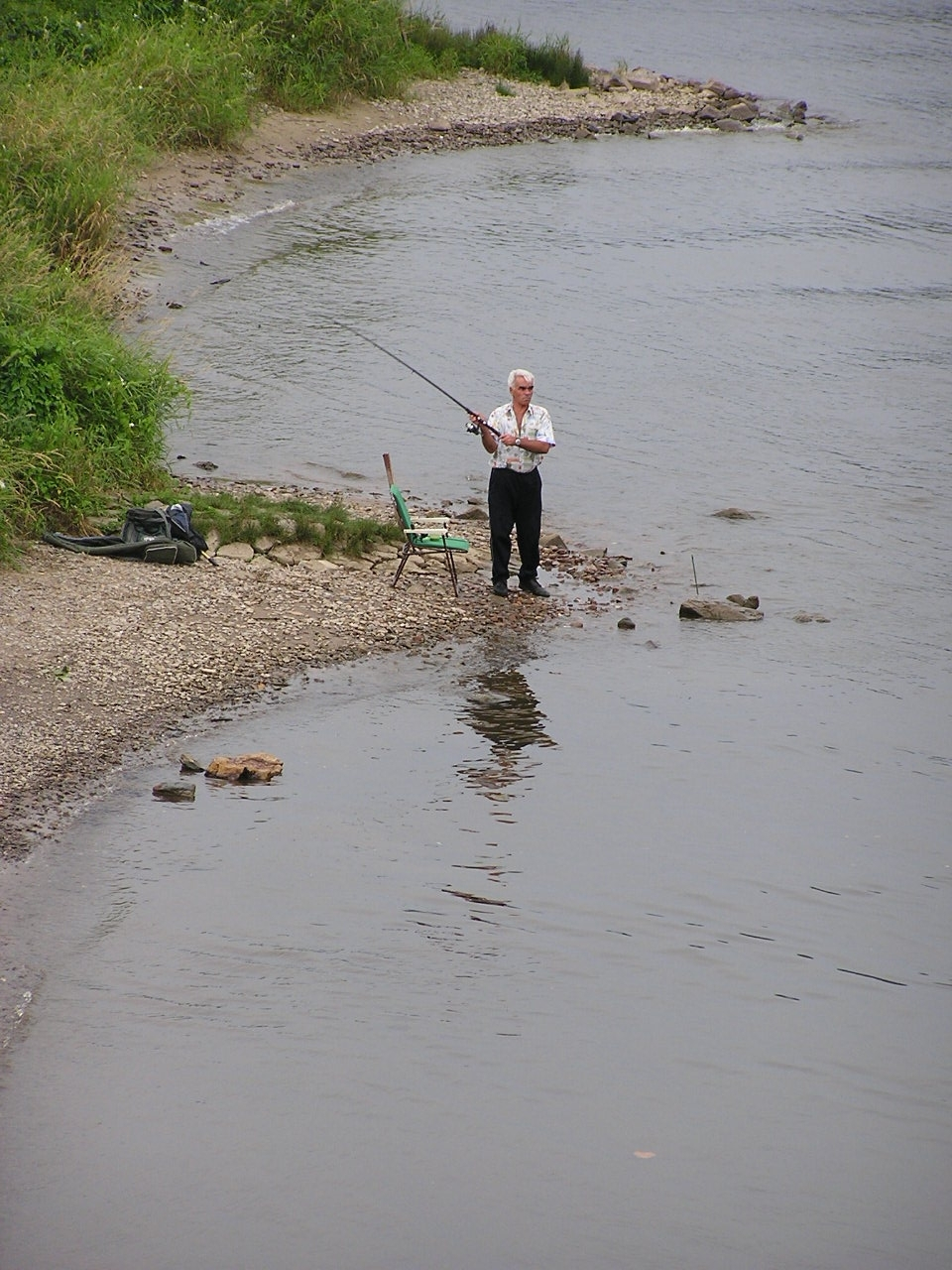

Bank fishing is fishing from banks or shores, typically very near but still above the water's edge. Bank fishing from rocky outcrops that protrude into the water is usually called rock fishing, and that from sand beach into the shoreside surf zone is called surf fishing. Bank fishing is typically done by angling, casting a tethered hook dressed with bait or lure into the water, and is usually performed by a rod often equipped with a reel, but handlines, nets, traps, bows, spears and snag hooks can also be used.

People who fish from a boat can sometimes access more areas in prime locations with greater ease than bank fishermen. However, many people who don't use boats find fishing from a bank has its own advantages. Many factors contribute to success in bank fishing, such as local knowledge, water depth, bank structure, location, time of day, and the types of bait and lures.

== Equipment ==
Fisherman have different preferences about the equipment they use for bank fishing, but most agree on the basics. Obviously fishing tackle is needed. Most bank fishing is performed with a rod, reel and lures or bait. Often two fishing rods are used. The bait can be changed on one rod while fishing continues with the other. Some fishermen bring a lidded container for the fish they catch which doubles as a seat. Other fishermen bring a stringer to hold the fish they catch. Catch and release fishermen don't need either of these. With advancing technology, some luxury equipment has been developed such as the fish finder that uses sonar or a camera to physically locate fish. This is typically reserved for boat fishing but can also be applied to bank fishing.

== Advantages ==
Some fishermen, and even professional anglers, find advantages in fishing from a bank. According to professional angler Joseph Raines, “I've bass-fished from the bank most of my life, and have had tremendous success. I have caught all of my 7lb+ bass from the bank. I recently caught a twelve pound bass right on the bank." Bank fishing requires the fisherman to scout and locate prime fishing locations. Some anglers view this as an advantage because it sharpens their skills by forcing them to pay close attention to important details that boating anglers may miss.

Bank fishing gives a more solid foundation to fish from, thus allowing the angler to fight bigger fish without worry as much about unsteady footing or the risk of drowning. Although all activities around and on the water carry the theoretical risk of falling/slipping into the water, by staying on dry land, bank fishing has significantly less such risk than wade fishing or boat fishing. Bank fishing also makes the angler land in the fish from a flatter angle, thus expending less effort against gravity than fishing atop more elevated structures (thus at steeper angles) such as piers, bridges or large yachts.

Bank fishing can also allow a person to reach areas that boats have difficulty reaching, such as shallow, rocky or densely vegetated areas that might be unsafe for a boat to navigate. Bank fishing also avoids the costs and effort involved in owning, maintaining and operating a boat, and are less demanding on local infrastructures such as piers, quays, ramps and pontoons.

== Disadvantages ==
Compared to bank fishing, boat fishing provides access to prime areas with greater ease and speed. Also, bank fishing doesn't allow access to fishing areas that are too far away from the bank. Boat fishing allows fishing for deepwater fish, such as lake trout, that may be impossible for bank fishermen to catch. A boat also allows fishing methods not available to bank fishermen such as trolling, deep water jigging, or down rigger fishing.

== Considerations ==
There are many things to take into consideration during and before bank fishing, and many of them depend on the type of fish you are fishing for. An important point to think about is the structure of the bank. Is it rocky, grassy, woody, or sandy. Different fish prefer different structure types. Also look at the surroundings on the bank. It may be an open area with no cover or it may be densely covered with trees. The surroundings could play a key role in providing shade (or not) which is important because it regulates water temperature and the viewpoint of the fish. Also look around at the surroundings for footprints, debris, broken branches and any other signs that other fishermen have been there. This may be a sign that the area has been over-fished which might reduce your chances of a good catch. One should even consider the minute things that might be easily overlooked. Pack lightly. When fishing from the bank you won't want to carry a large load. Blend into your surroundings. Fish are able to see things through the water that may seem out of the ordinary and might spook them. Remember to be quiet near the water and minimize the amount of noise made with the bank which could also spook the fish. Finally, a rule of thumb is to use no longer than a 6-foot pole when fishing near trees or brush to minimize getting hooked on branches.

== See also ==
- Fishing
- Fishing lure
- Bass (fish)
- Crappie angling
