= Ann Arbor Charter Township, Michigan =

Ann Arbor Township, Michigan
- Charter township
- Charter Township of Ann Arbor
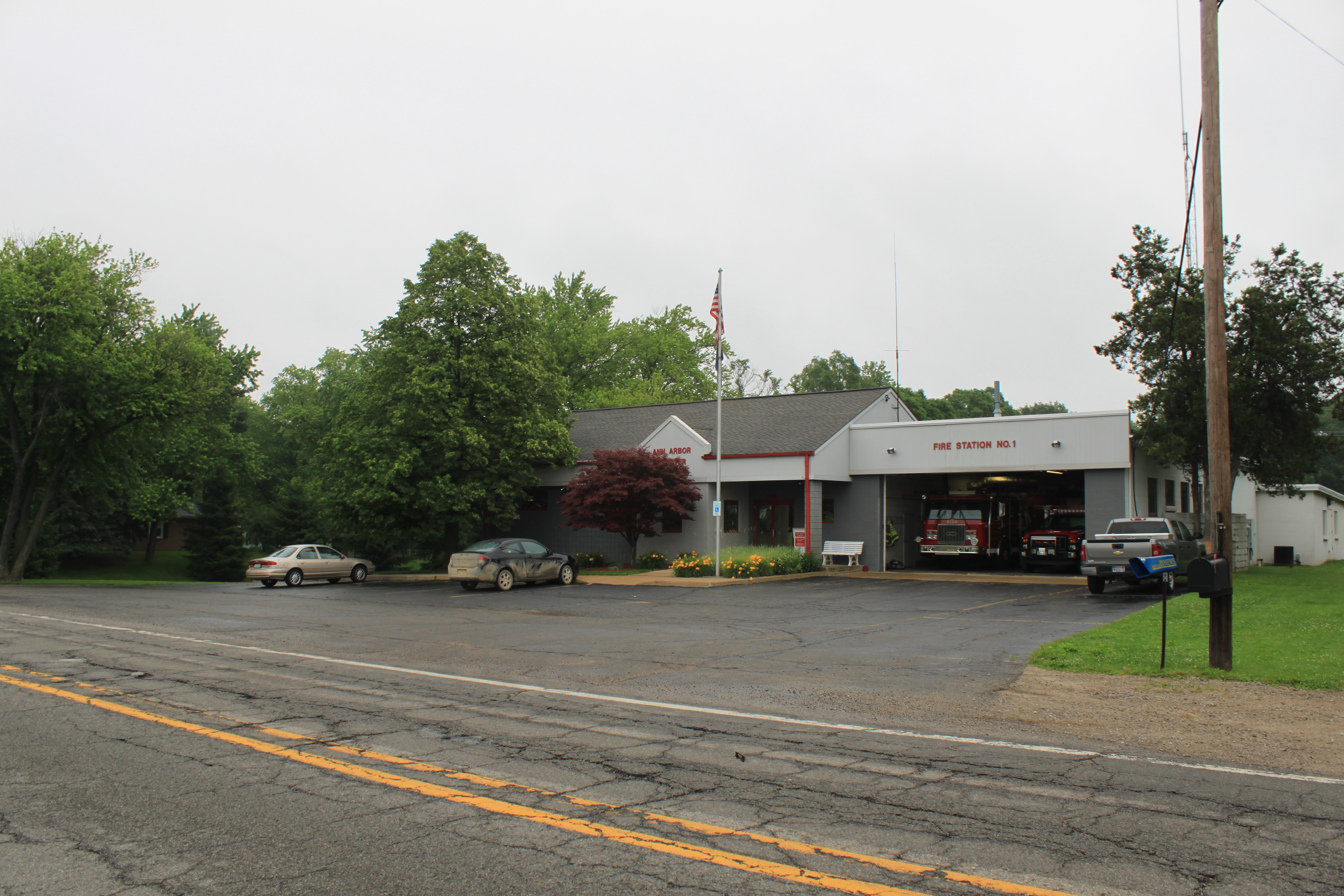
- Township Hall and Fire Station on Pontiac Trail

- Seal

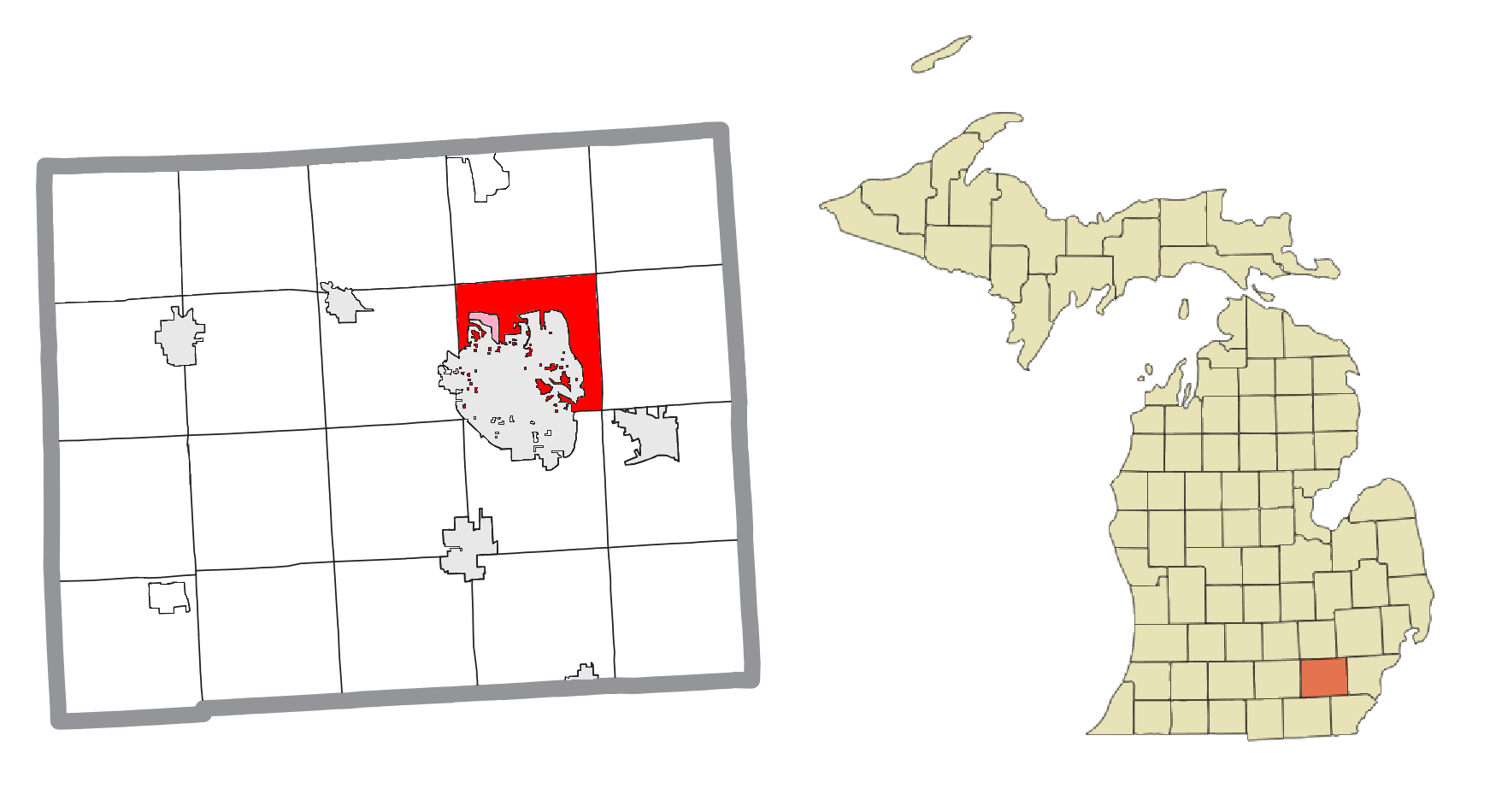
- Location within Washtenaw County (red) and the administered village of Barton Hills (pink)

- Location within the state of Michigan Location within the United States
- Coordinates: 42°17′47″N 83°43′13″W
- Country: United States
- State: Michigan
- County: Washtenaw
- Organized: 1827

Government
  - Supervisor: Michael Moran
  - Clerk: Rena Basch

Area
  - Total: 16.88 sq mi (43.72 km^{2})
  - Land: 16.73 sq mi (43.33 km^{2})
  - Water: 0.15 sq mi (0.39 km^{2})
- Elevation: 945 ft (288 m)

Population (2020)
  - Total: 4,673
  - Density: 279.3/sq mi (107.8/km^{2})
- Time zone: UTC-5 (Eastern (EST))
  - Summer (DST): UTC-4 (EDT)
- ZIP code(s): 48104, 48105, 48109 (Ann Arbor)
- Area code: 734
- FIPS code: 26-03020
- GNIS feature ID: 1625838
- Website: aatwp.org

Ann Arbor Charter Township is a charter township in Washtenaw County in the U.S. state of Michigan. It is separate from the city of Ann Arbor, and consists of an expansive area of rural and suburban land immediately north and east of the city, as well as numerous small exclaves surrounded by Ann Arbor's city limits. As of the 2020 census, the township had a population of 4,673.

== Communities ==
- Barton Hills is a village within the township.
- Foster is an unincorporated community located within the township at 42°18′52″N 83°46′52″W. The settlement began around 1877 as the site of Cornwell Mills. While it was also referred to as Cornwell and Newport, it became more known as Foster after pioneering settler Samuel Foster.
- Geddes is an unincorporated community located within the township just south of the Huron River at 42°16′01″N 83°40′04″W. The area was first settled by Orrin White and his family in 1824, and the community grew in a few years when more families moved to the area. A post office named Geddes opened on July 21, 1875 and was named after its first postmaster John Geddes. The post office only operated for two months and closed on September 21, 1875. The community became a station along the Michigan Central Railroad in 1878, and the Ypsilanti Paper Company operated a pulp mill along the river. The post office was restored and operated from May 3, 1894 until July 31, 1901.

== History ==
The "Township of Ann Arbour" was organized in 1827 by the Legislative Council of the Michigan Territory and the Village of Ann Arbour, which later became the City of Ann Arbor, was organized in 1833. As villages remain part of the township, the village of Ann Arbour did not become completely detached from the township until it reorganized as the city of Ann Arbor.

== Geography ==
According to the U.S. Census Bureau, the township has a total area of 16.88 square miles (43.72 km^{2}), of which 16.73 square miles (43.33 km^{2}) is land and 0.15 square miles (0.39 km^{2}) (0.89%) is water.

The Huron River flows through the township and contains Geddes Dam in the southeastern portion. The Border-to-Border Trail runs through the southeast edge of township along the river near Geddes Dam. Barton Dam is within the city limits of Ann Arbor, but the township contains boundaries along the dam's Barton Pond reservoir.

=== Major highways ===
- US 23 runs through the township and forms part of the border with the city of Ann Arbor.
- Bus. US 23 is a business loop that runs briefly through the township before merging with US 23.
- M-14 runs through the township and runs concurrently with US 23 and also with Bus. US 23 for portions of its route.

== Demographics ==
As of the census of 2000, there were 4,720 people, 1,972 households, and 1,317 families residing in the township. The population density was 267.5 inhabitants per square mile (103.3/km^{2}). There were 2,034 housing units at an average density of 115.3 per square mile (44.5/km^{2}). The racial makeup of the township was 81.21% White, 2.25% African American, 0.17% Native American, 13.58% Asian, 0.06% Pacific Islander, 0.85% from other races, and 1.89% from two or more races. Hispanic or Latino of any race were 2.22% of the population.

There were 1,972 households, out of which 27.7% had children under the age of 18 living with them, 61.0% were married couples living together, 4.4% had a female householder with no husband present, and 33.2% were non-families. 26.7% of all households were made up of individuals, and 4.8% had someone living alone who was 65 years of age or older. The average household size was 2.32 and the average family size was 2.84.

In the township the population was spread out, with 21.1% under the age of 18, 4.6% from 18 to 24, 30.9% from 25 to 44, 28.1% from 45 to 64, and 15.2% who were 65 years of age or older. The median age was 41 years. For every 100 females, there were 95.4 males. For every 100 females age 18 and over, there were 93.7 males.

The median income for a household in the township was $86,797, and the median income for a family was $103,102. Males had a median income of $75,176 versus $45,320 for females. The per capita income for the township was $56,084. About 1.2% of families and 3.2% of the population were below the poverty line, including 1.7% of those under age 18 and 1.6% of those age 65 or over.

== Economy ==
Domino's has its headquarters in Ann Arbor Township, located in the Domino's Farms office park.

In 2007 Toyota employed 932 people at the Toyota Technical Center in Ann Arbor Township. Calty Design Research Inc., a Toyota design firm, has the Calty Design Research at Ann Arbor in the township. Con-way moved its headquarters from San Mateo, California to Ann Arbor Township in 2011.

== Education ==
Ann Arbor Charter Township is served entirely by Ann Arbor Public Schools. The main campus of Washtenaw Community College is located in the southeastern corner of the township.

== Images ==
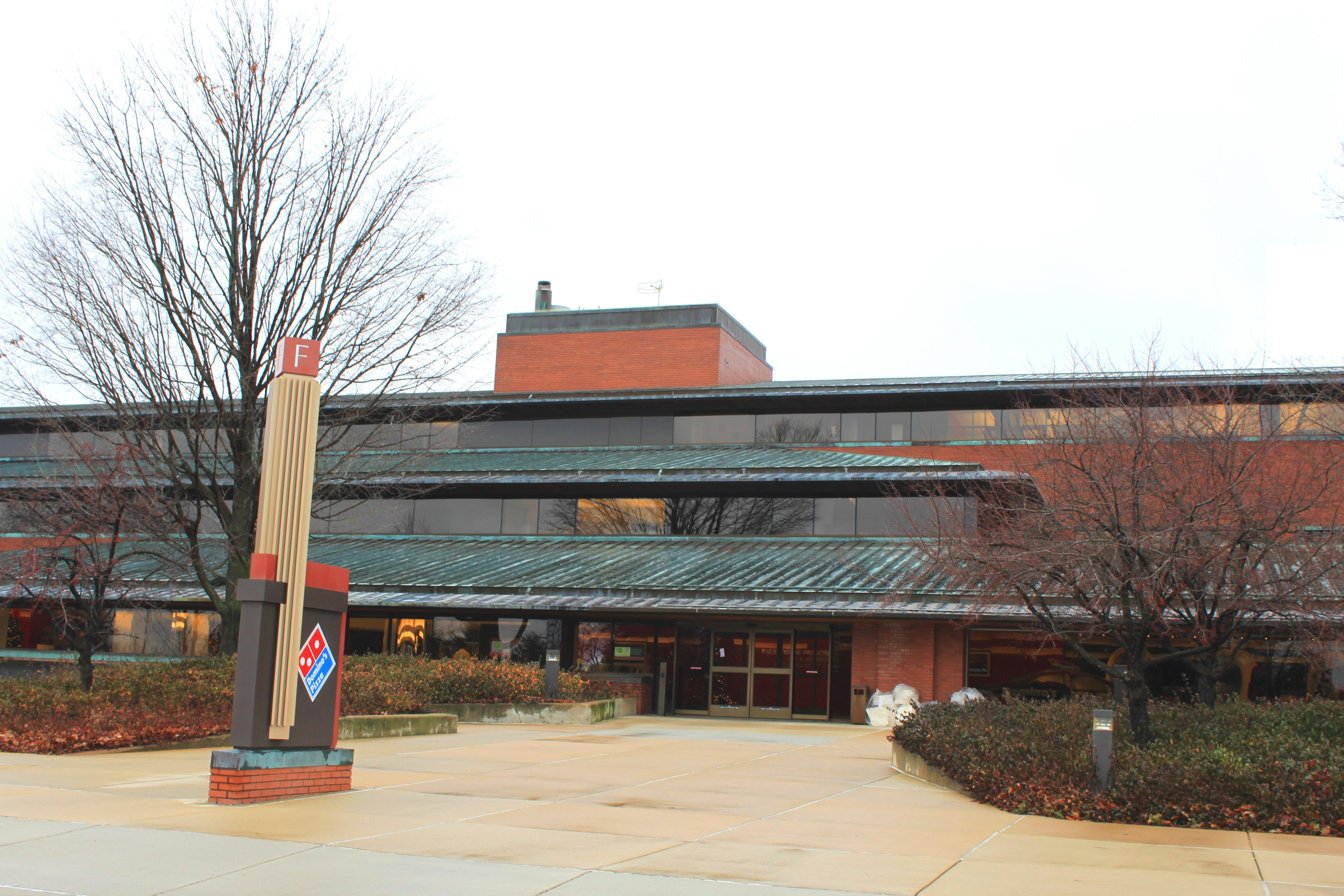
Domino's Pizza headquarters

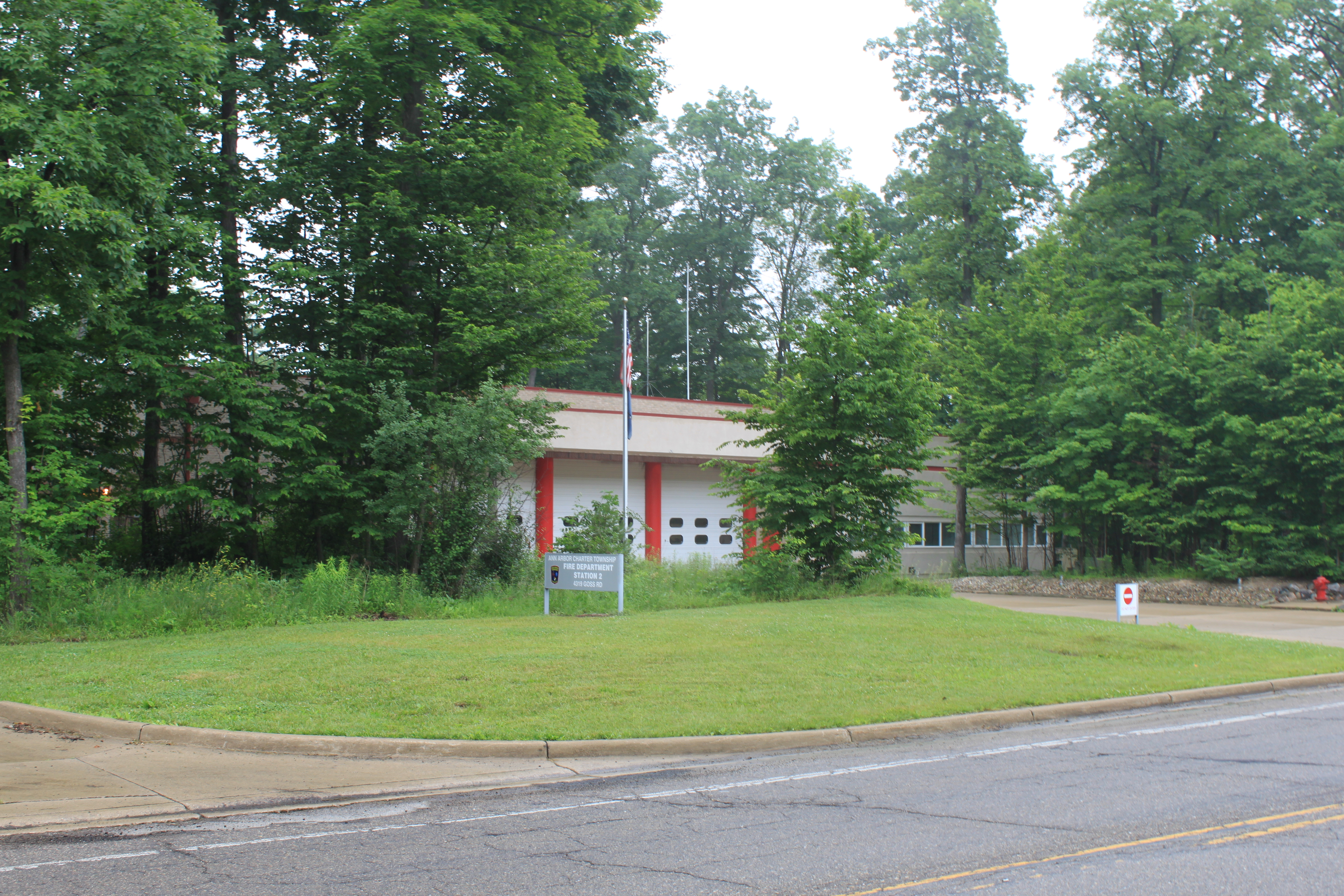
Fire Department Station 2

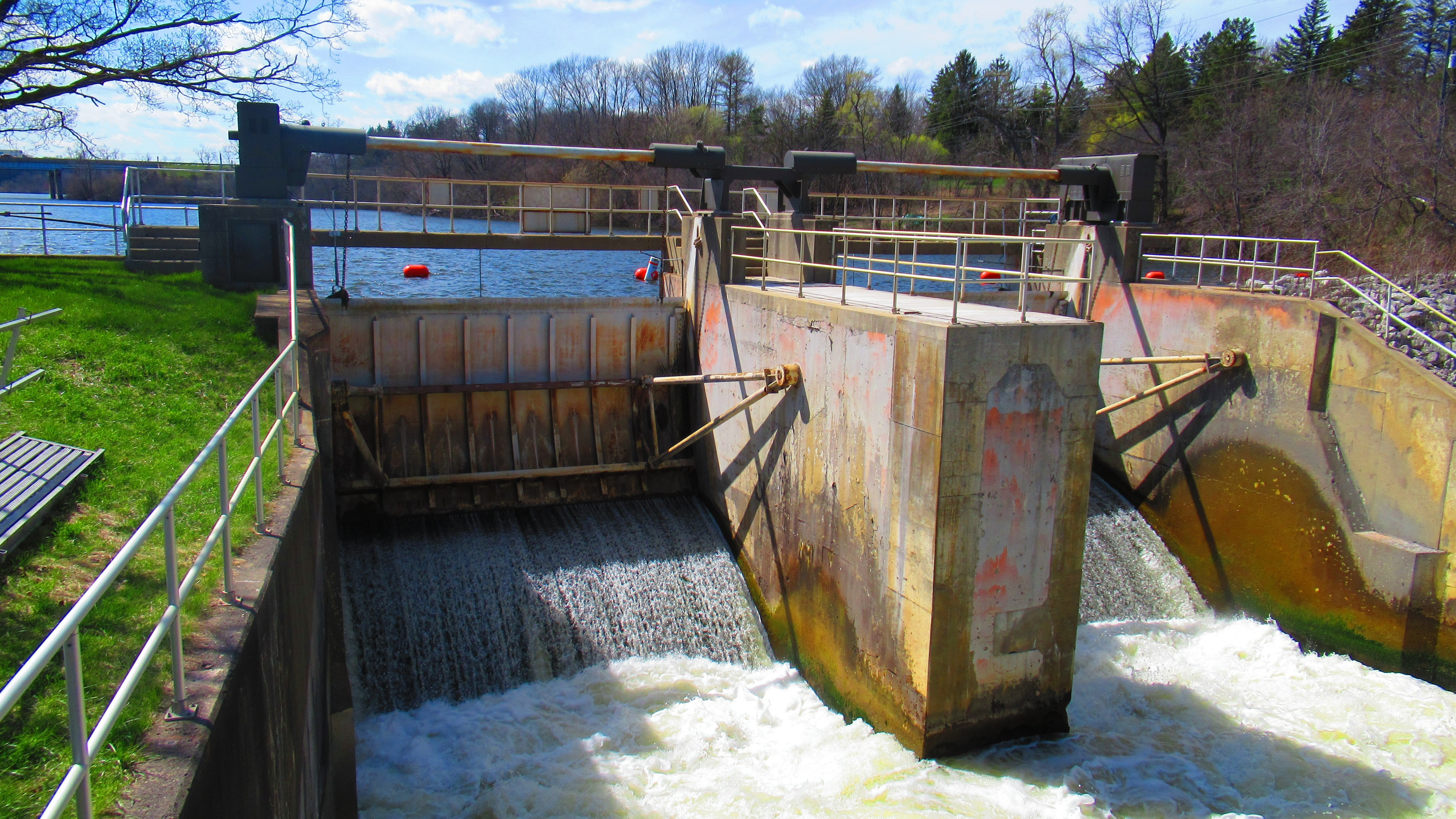
Geddes Dam

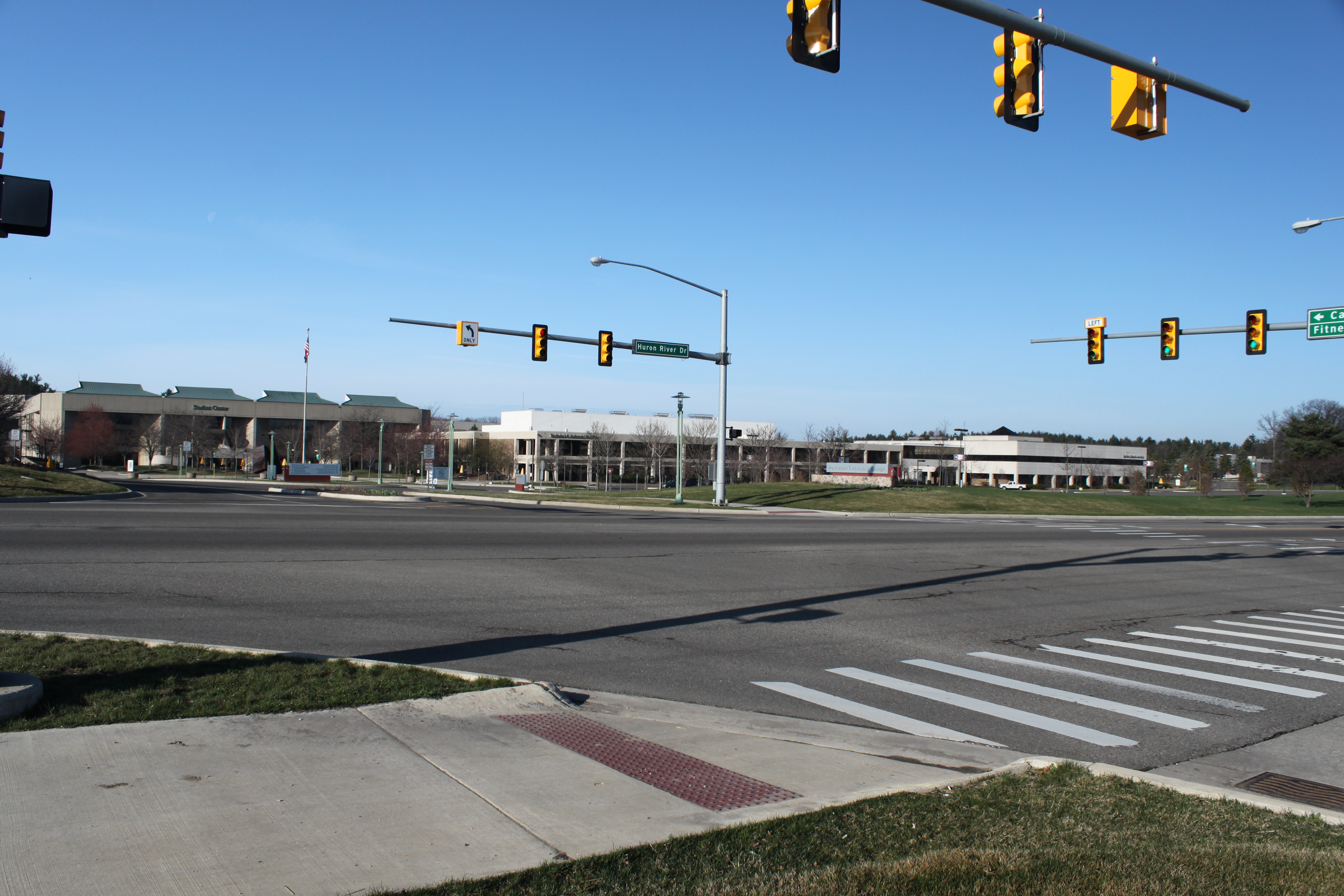
Washtenaw Community College
