= Willow, Michigan =

- Unincorporated community
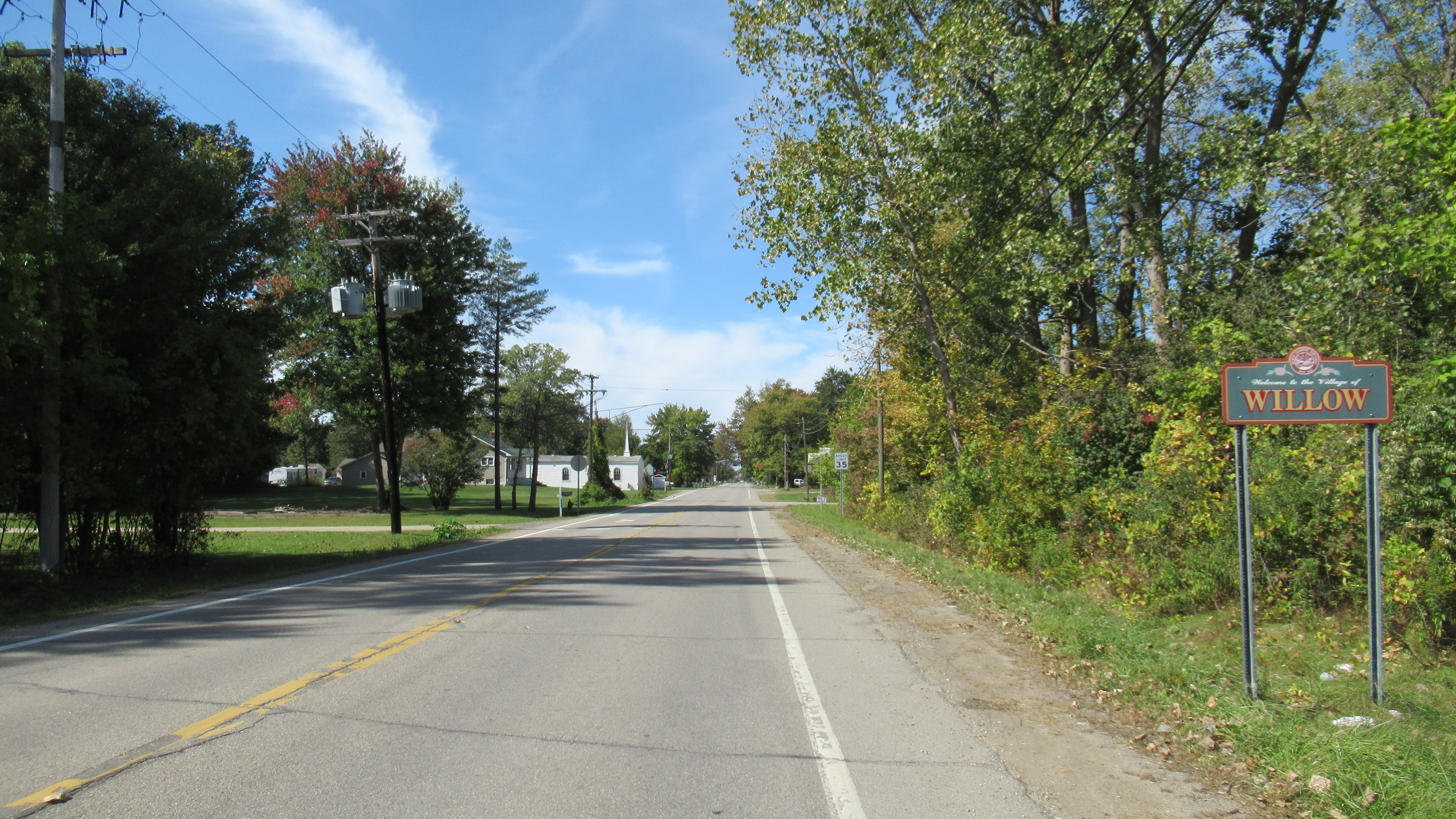
- Looking west along Willow Road

- Location within the state of Michigan Location within the United States
- Coordinates: 42°06′56″N 83°23′44″W
- Country: United States
- State: Michigan
- County: Wayne
- Township: Huron
- Settled: 1852
- Elevation: 627 ft (191 m)
- Time zone: UTC-5 (Eastern (EST))
  - Summer (DST): UTC-4 (EDT)
- ZIP code(s): 48164 (New Boston)
- Area code: 734
- GNIS feature ID: 1616527

Willow is an unincorporated community in Wayne County in the U.S. state of Michigan. The community is located within Huron Charter Township. As an unincorporated community, Willow has no legally defined boundaries or population statistics of its own.

== Geography ==
The community sits at an elevation of 627 feet (191 m) above sea level.

According to road signage, the community is centered along Willow Road between Waltz Road on the west and a double set of railroad tracks to the east. Willow is located close to three divisions of the Huron–Clinton Metroparks system: Lower Huron, Oakwoods, and Willow. The Huron River flows near the community, and Interstate 275 is slightly east but has no access from Willow Road. The community of Waltz is to the south, and New Boston is to the north.

The community is served by Huron School District.

== History ==
Huron Charter Township, where the community of Willow is located, was established in 1827.

The area presently known as Willow received its first post office named Woodville in 1852. The name of the post office was changed to Smithville from 1858 to 1872, when it was changed to Waltz briefly from 1872 to 1873. The Waltz post office was moved to another location from 1874 to 1954, and the former post office served under the name Belden from 1873 to 1892. The post office was finally renamed as Willow in 1892 until it was discontinued in 1915. The Pere Marquette Railway built a line through the area around 1872. Willow once contained a railroad station. The railway line is currently used by CSX Transportation but contains no stations within the area.

The community of Willow currently uses the New Boston post office with the 48164 ZIP Code. The name Willow is no longer accepted or used for mailing purposes. Willow is informally defined as a village within the township, although it has no legal recognition as an incorporated municipality.
