= Huron Charter Township, Michigan =

Huron Township, Michigan
- Charter township
- Huron Charter Township
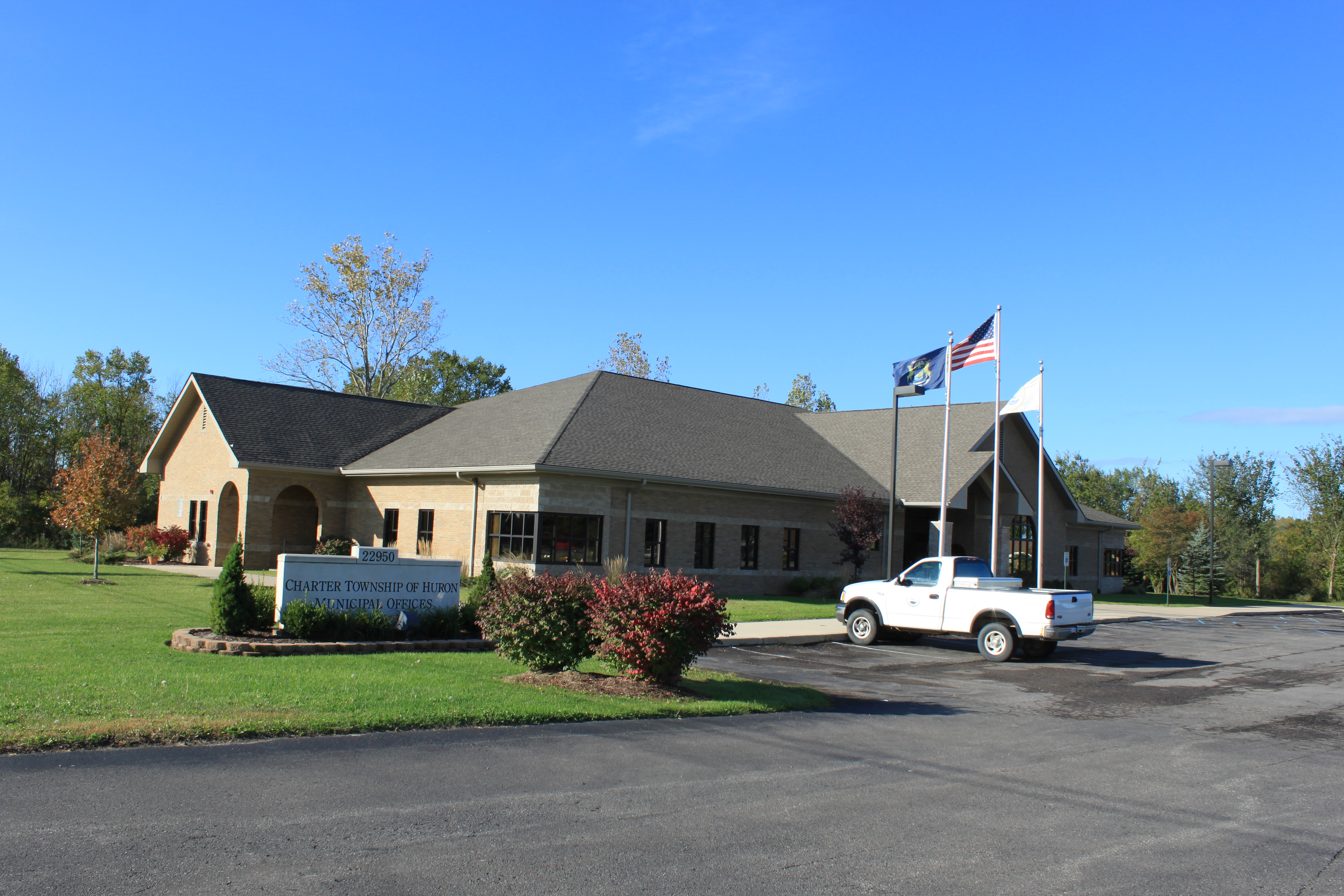
- Township Municipal Offices

- Location within Wayne County

- Location within the state of Michigan Location within the United States
- Coordinates: 42°08′01″N 83°21′43″W
- Country: United States
- State: Michigan
- County: Wayne
- Established: 1827

Government
  - Supervisor: David Glaab
  - Clerk: Jeremy Cady

Area
  - Charter township: 35.83 sq mi (92.80 km^{2})
  - Land: 35.35 sq mi (91.56 km^{2})
  - Water: 0.48 sq mi (1.24 km^{2})
- Elevation: 620 ft (189 m)

Population (2020)
  - Charter township: 16,944
  - Density: 479.3/sq mi (185.1/km^{2})
  - Metro: 4,285,832 (Metro Detroit)
- Time zone: UTC-5 (EST)
  - Summer (DST): UTC-4 (EDT)
- ZIP code(s): 48111 (Belleville); 48134 (Flat Rock); 48164 (New Boston); 48174 (Romulus)
- Area code: 734
- FIPS code: 26-40040
- GNIS feature ID: 1626507
- Website: Official website

Huron Charter Township is a charter township of Wayne County in the U.S. state of Michigan. The population was 16,944 at the 2020 census. Huron Charter Township is named after the Huron River, which flows southeast through the township. The township is home to three divisions of the Huron–Clinton Metroparks system: Lower Huron, Oakwoods, and Willow.

== Communities ==
- New Boston is an unincorporated community located within the township at 42°09′46″N 83°24′10″W. New Boston contains its own post office that uses the 48164 ZIP Code, which serves most of the township and a small portion of Sumpter Township to the west and Brownstown Charter Township to the east.
- Waltz is an unincorporated community located just west of Interstate 275 along Waltz Road at 42°06′01″N 83°23′32″W.
- Willow is an unincorporated community located along Willow Road just west of Interstate 275 at 42°06′01″N 83°23′44″W.

== History ==
Huron Township was organized in 1827 and originally included the land that now contains the cities of Romulus and Belleville as well as the townships of Van Buren and Sumpter. In the 1830s, a settlement was platted on the banks of the Huron River. The first post office opened with the name Huron, but soon closed. In 1860 a new post office was opened with the name Catville but changed its name to New Boston by 1868. Other early settlements included Belden, platted in 1857 by Frances J. Belden and now known as Willow, and Waltz, platted in 1872 by Joseph Waltz.

On March 17, 1835 the northeastern portion of Huron Township was set off and organized as Romulus Township. Within a few weeks, on April 6, 1835, the northwestern portion of the township became Van Buren Township. On April 6, 1840 the western half of the remaining portion of Huron Township organized as the township of Sumpter, creating the current boundaries of township.

The Waltz Road–Huron River Bridge, first constructed in 1924 and later replaced in 2017, is listed on the National Register of Historic Places.

== Geography ==
According to the U.S. Census Bureau, the township has a total area of 35.83 square miles (92.80 km^{2}), of which 35.35 square miles (91.56 km^{2}) is land and 0.48 square miles (1.24 km^{2}) (1.34%) is water.

=== Major highways ===
- I-275 runs south–north through the center of the township. The highway has three access points within the township: exit 8 (Will Carleton Road) at the county line with Monroe County, exit 11 (South Huron Road), and exit 13 (Sibley Road).

== Demographics ==
=== Racial and ethnic composition ===
Huron Charter Township, Michigan – Racial and ethnic composition Note: the US Census treats Hispanic/Latino as an ethnic category. This table excludes Latinos from the racial categories and assigns them to a separate category. Hispanics/Latinos may be of any race.
Race / Ethnicity (NH = Non-Hispanic)	Pop 2000	Pop 2010	Pop 2020	% 2000	% 2010	% 2020
White alone (NH)	12,958	14,415	14,117	94.33%	90.78%	83.32%
Black or African American alone (NH)	140	398	760	1.02%	2.51%	4.49%
Native American or Alaska Native alone (NH)	76	102	51	0.55%	0.64%	0.30%
Asian alone (NH)	46	114	158	0.33%	0.72%	0.93%
Native Hawaiian or Pacific Islander alone (NH)	1	1	2	0.01%	0.01%	0.01%
Other race alone (NH)	13	6	73	0.09%	0.04%	0.43%
Mixed race or Multiracial (NH)	159	341	877	1.16%	2.15%	5.18%
Hispanic or Latino (any race)	344	502	906	2.50%	3.16%	5.35%
Total	13,737	15,879	16,944	100.00%	100.00%	100.00%

=== 2000 census ===
As of the census of 2000, there were 13,737 people, 4,745 households, and 3,796 families residing in the township. The population density was 386.2 inhabitants per square mile (149.1/km^{2}). There were 4,888 housing units at an average density of 137.4 per square mile (53.1/km^{2}). The racial makeup of the township was 95.96% White, 1.08% African American, 0.64% Native American, 0.36% Asian, 0.01% Pacific Islander, 0.52% from other races, and 1.43% from two or more races. Hispanic or Latino residents of any race were 2.50% of the population.

There were 4,745 households, out of which 39.9% had children under the age of 18 living with them, 65.3% were married couples living together, 10.1% had a female householder with no husband present, and 20.0% were non-families. 15.8% of all households were made up of individuals, and 5.0% had someone living alone who was 65 years of age or older. The average household size was 2.88 and the average family size was 3.19.

In the township 28.4% of the population was under the age of 18, 7.7% was from 18 to 24, 31.7% from 25 to 44, 24.4% from 45 to 64, and 7.7% was 65 years of age or older. The median age was 35 years. For every 100 females, there were 100.9 males. For every 100 females age 18 and over, there were 98.8 males.

The median income for a household in the township was $59,890, and the median income for a family was $63,003. Males had a median income of $49,356 versus $31,140 for females. The per capita income for the township was $23,497. About 3.4% of families and 5.7% of the population were below the poverty line, including 5.9% of those under age 18 and 4.9% of those age 65 or over.

== Education ==
Huron Township contains its own school district, Huron School District, which serves most of the township and very small portions of Ash Township to the south in Monroe County. The southeastern corner of the township is served by Flat Rock Community Schools, and the northeastern portion of the township is served by Woodhaven-Brownstown School District.
