= List of people from Downriver =

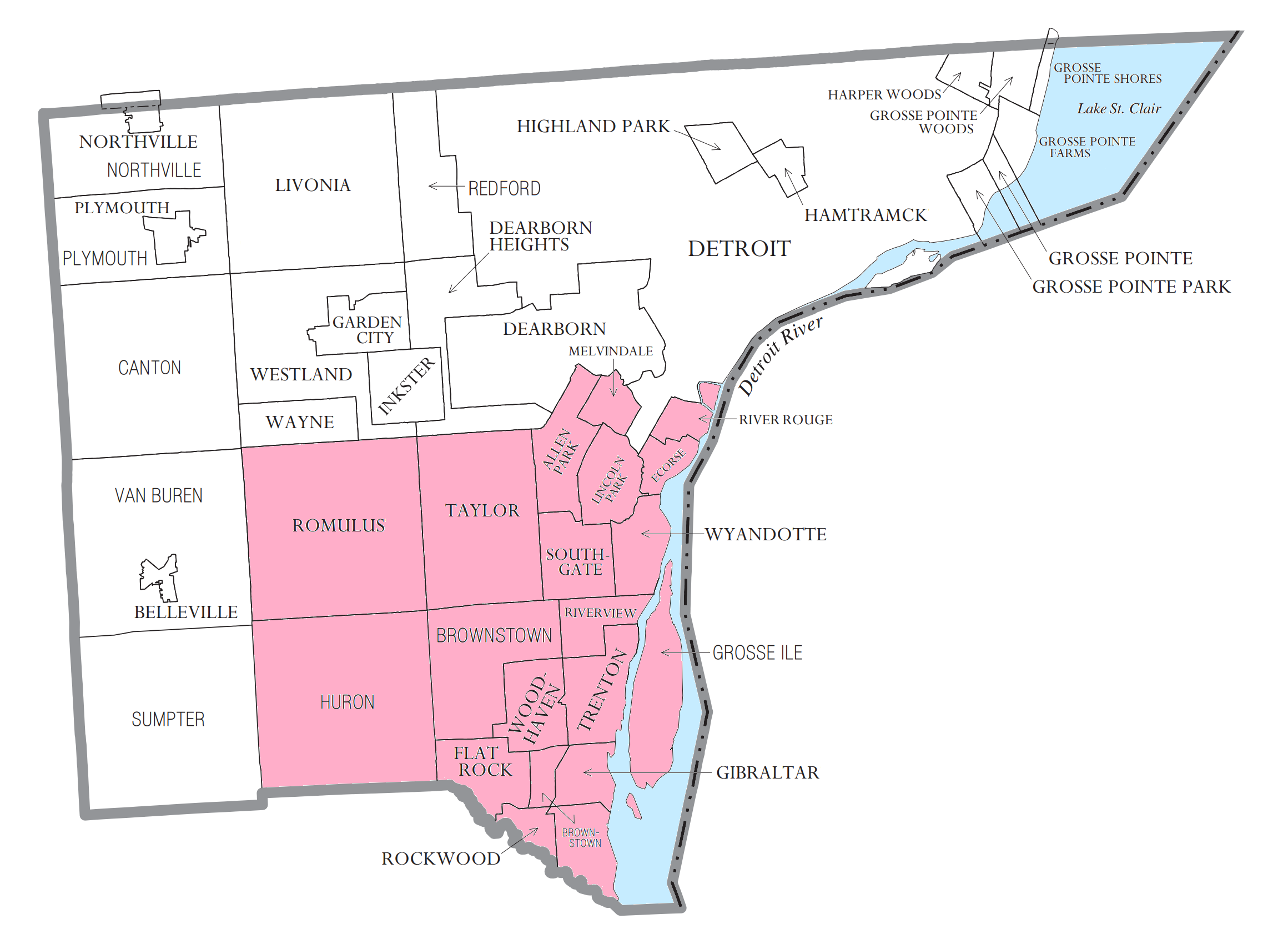
U.S. Census data map showing local municipal boundaries within Wayne County. Areas shaded in pink represent Downriver communities.

This is a list of notable people from the Downriver region of Metro Detroit, Michigan, United States. Although not everyone listed was born in a Downriver community, they all live (or have lived) there, and have significant connections to the region. The communities of Downriver are:

- Allen Park
- Brownstown Charter Township
- Ecorse
- Flat Rock
- Gibraltar
- Grosse Ile Township
- Huron Charter Township

  - New Boston
  - Waltz
  - Willow

- Lincoln Park
- Melvindale
- River Rouge
- Riverview
- Rockwood
- Romulus
- Southgate
- Taylor
- Trenton
- Woodhaven
- Wyandotte

== Notable people ==
Name	Community	Known for
Paul Assenmacher	Allen Park; Southgate	Former MLB pitcher who played for the Atlanta Braves, Chicago Cubs, New York Yankees, Chicago White Sox, and Cleveland Indians
Steve Avery	Trenton; Taylor; Dearborn	Former MLB pitcher who played for the Atlanta Braves, Boston Red Sox, Cincinnati Reds, and Detroit Tigers
Lucille Ball	Wyandotte	Actress
Joe C.	Trenton; Taylor	Rapper; hype man for Kid Rock
Lloyd Carr	Riverview	Former head football coach for the University of Michigan
Al Cicotte	Melvindale	Former MLB pitcher who played for several teams including the New York Yankees, Washington Senators, Detroit Tigers, and Cleveland Indians
Archie Clark	Ecorse	Former professional basketball player who played for five NBA teams 1966–1976; considered the father of the crossover dribble
Dann Florek	Flat Rock	Actor and film director, best known for his role as NYPD Captain Donald Cragen on NBC's Law & Order
Max Gail	Grosse Ile	Actor
Fred Gladding	Flat Rock	Former MLB pitcher who played for the Detroit Tigers and Houston Astros
Andy Greene	Trenton	Former NHL defenseman for the New Jersey Devils and New York Islanders
Bob Guiney	Riverview	Television personality who was a contestant on the first season of The Bachelorette and the fourth season of The Bachelor; host of GSN Live 2009–2012
Mike Jolly	Melvindale	Former NFL safety for the Green Bay Packers
William S. Knudsen	Grosse Ile	Automotive industry executive and U.S. Army general
Bob Kuzava	Wyandotte; Grosse Ile	Former professional baseball pitcher who played for eight MLB teams 1946–1957
Charley Lau	Romulus	Former MLB player (1956–1967) and hitting coach (1969–1983)
John Long	Romulus	Former professional basketball player; played in the NBA, CBA, and for the Tours Joué Basket in France
Budd Lynch	Wyandotte	Public address announcer and radio play-by-play announcer of the Detroit Red Wings from 1949 to 2012 (his death)
Eric Lynch	Woodhaven	Former NFL running back for the Detroit Lions; played for the WLAF Scottish Claymores
Lee Majors	Wyandotte	Actor
Terry Mills	Romulus	Former NBA power forward who played for five NBA teams, including the Detroit Pistons 1990–2001
Bill Morrison	Lincoln Park	Co-creator of Bongo Comics
Kevin Nash	Trenton	Retired professional wrestler; actor
Ransom E. Olds	Grosse Ile	Automotive industry pioneer; namesake for Oldsmobile and REO brands
Heinz Prechter	Grosse Ile	Automotive industry entrepreneur who founded the American Sunroof Company
J. J. Putz	Trenton	Former MLB pitcher for the Arizona Diamondbacks
Brian Rafalski	Wyandotte	Former NFL defenseman for the New Jersey Devils and Detroit Red Wings; also played hockey for Team USA at the Winter Olympics in 2002 and 2006
Mary Lynn Rajskub	Trenton	Actor
Bob Seger	Lincoln Park	Retired singer, songwriter, and rock musician
Matt Shoemaker	Wyandotte	Former MLB player who played for the Los Angeles Angels, Toronto Blue Jays, and Minnesota Twins; also played for the Yomiuri Giants
Jessica Smith	Melvindale Allen Park	Professional speed skater; competed in the 2014 Winter Olympic Games
Derek St. Holmes	Riverview	Guitarist for Ted Nugent
Chester Taylor	River Rouge	Former NFL running back for the Chicago Bears, Minnesota Vikings, and Baltimore Ravens
Robert Teet	River Rouge; Riverview	Professional and amateur wrestler; U.S. Wrestling Team member and All World honors recipient; author
Tom Tresh	Allen Park	Former MLB player who played for the New York Yankees and Detroit Tigers; MLB Rookie of the Year 1962
Preston Tucker	Lincoln Park	Automotive industry entrepreneur, known for designing the Tucker 48
Rob Tyner	Lincoln Park	Rock musician; vocalist of MC5
Jennifer Valoppi	Allen Park	Newscaster, producer, and author
John Varvatos	Allen Park	Fashion designer
Vickie Winans	Ecorse	Gospel singer
