= New Boston, Michigan =

- Unincorporated community
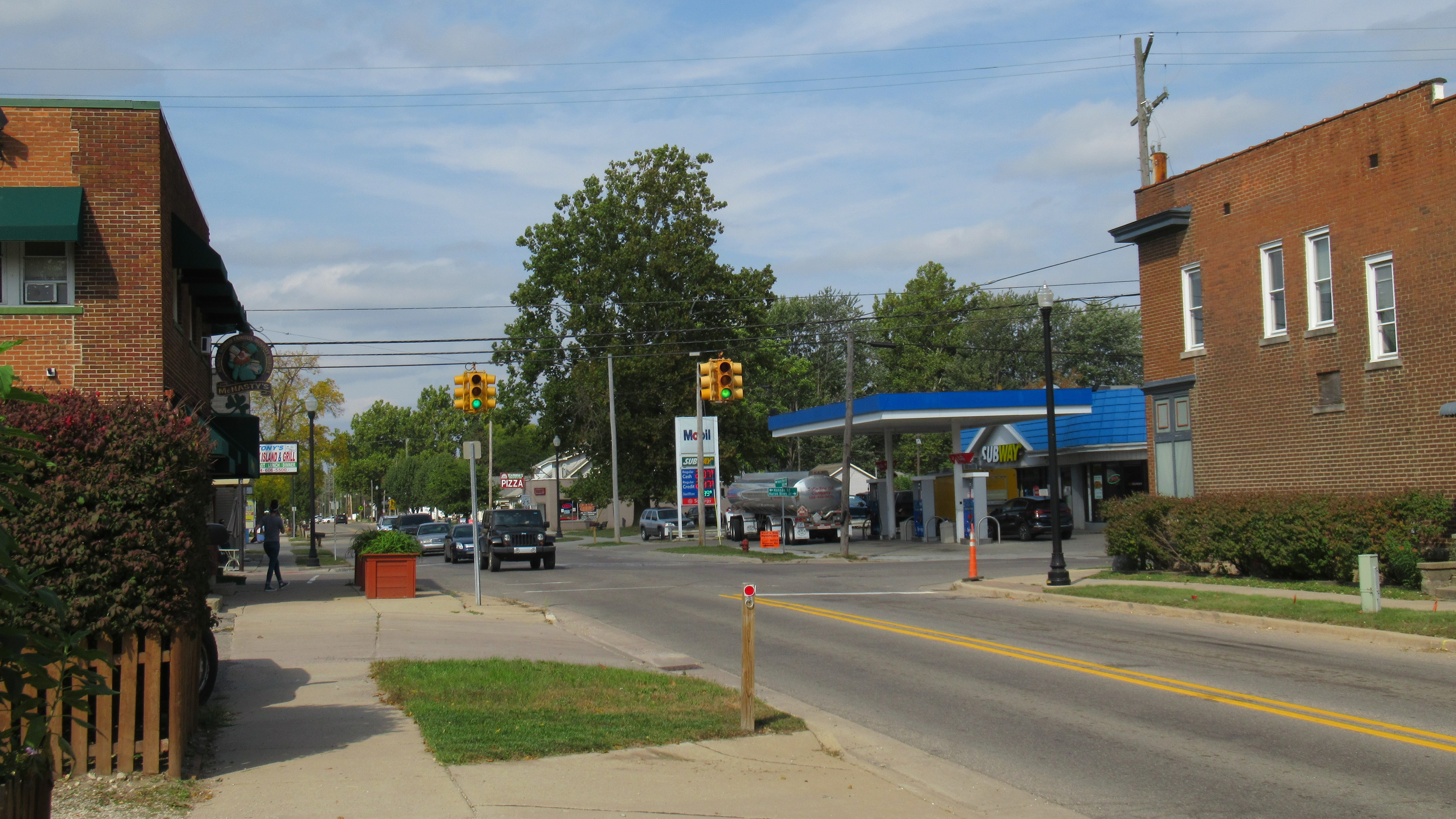
- Intersection of Hannan and Huron River Drive

- Location within the state of Michigan Location within the United States
- Coordinates: 42°09′45″N 83°24′11″W
- Country: United States
- State: Michigan
- County: Wayne
- Township: Huron
- Settled: 1827
- Elevation: 636 ft (194 m)
- Time zone: UTC-5 (Eastern (EST))
  - Summer (DST): UTC-4 (EDT)
- ZIP code(s): 48164
- Area code: 734
- FIPS code: 26-26163
- GNIS feature ID: 0633315

New Boston is an unincorporated community in Wayne County in the U.S. state of Michigan. The community is located within Huron Charter Township. As an unincorporated community, New Boston has no legally defined boundaries or population statistics of its own.

New Boston is located close to three divisions of the Huron–Clinton Metroparks system: Lower Huron, Oakwoods, and Willow. The Huron River runs through New Boston. The community has its own post office with the 48164 ZIP Code, which also serves the communities of Waltz and Willow, as well as smaller portions of Sumpter Township to the west and Brownstown Charter Township to the east. The community is served by Huron School District.

== History ==
New Boston was first settled in 1827 and was originally called "Catville" after the initials of the proprietor, C. A. Trowbridge. It received a post office with that name in 1860. On March 20, 1868, it was renamed New Boston, after Boston, Massachusetts.

== Transportation ==
Interstate 275 passes through the middle of the community with three exits within the New Boston ZIP Code area: Will Carleton Road (exit 8), South Huron Road (exit 11). Clark Road makes the border with the Township of Sumpter, and Sibley Road (exit 13). The Detroit Metropolitan Airport is just north of New Boston in the city of Romulus.

The Waltz Road–Huron River Bridge is a bridge crossing the Huron River just south of the central business district of New Boston.
