= Lake Erie Metropark =

Park in Michigan, United States

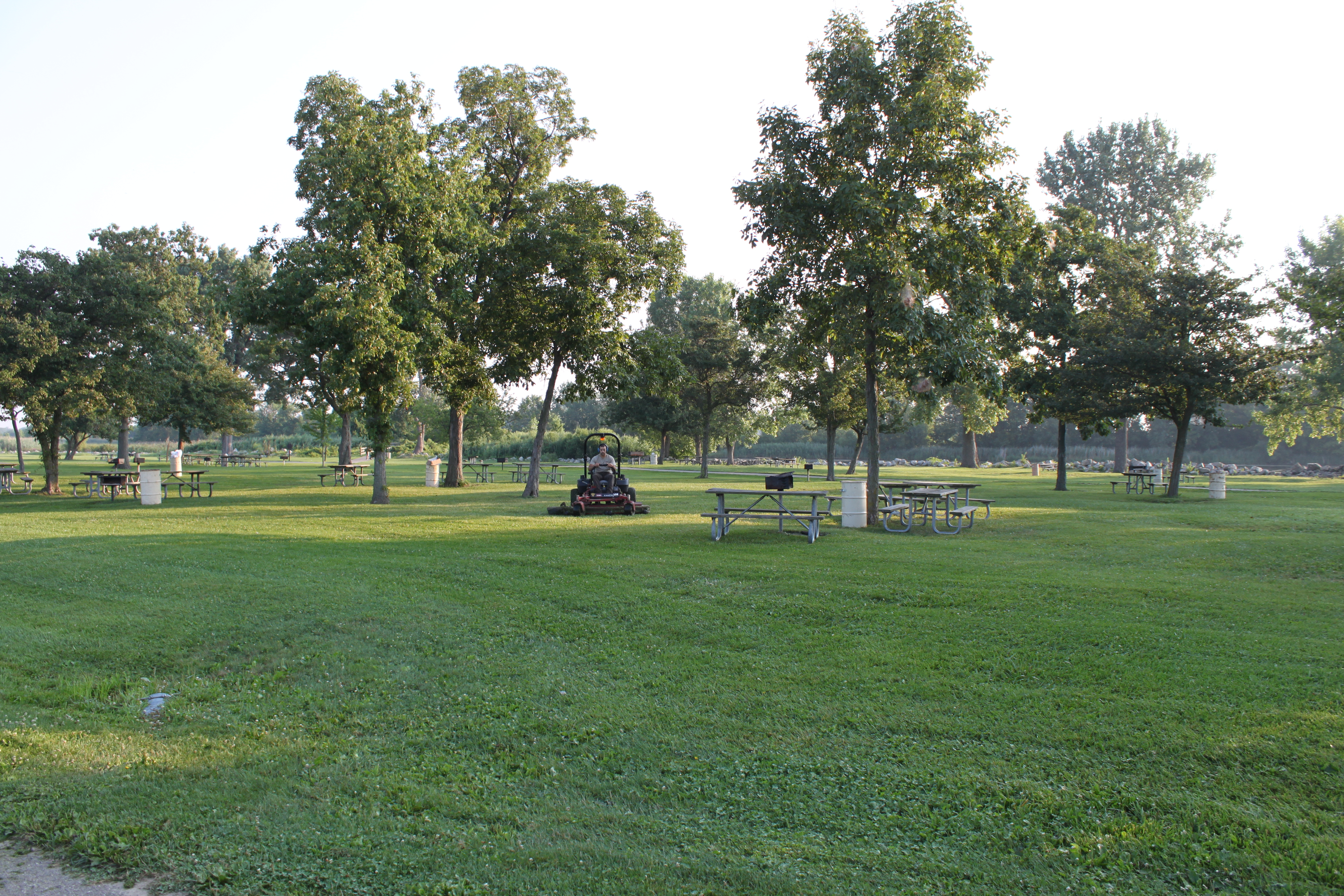
- Cove Point picnic area

- Location within Huron-Clinton Metroparks
- Type: Regional park
- Location: 32481 West Jefferson Avenue, Brownstown Charter Township, Michigan, United States, 48173
- Coordinates: 42°04′14.22″N 83°12′38.92″W
- Area: 1,607 acres (650 ha)
- Operator: Huron–Clinton Metroparks
- Status: Open year round
- Website: www.metroparks.com/lake-erie-metropark/

Lake Erie Metropark is a park in the Huron–Clinton system of metro parks. The park is a 1,607-acre (6.50 km^{2}) recreational facility located between the mouth of the Huron River on Lake Erie to the south and the City of Gibraltar to the north, and consists of natural marshes and ponds, hike and bike trails, nature trails, a marina, and a boat launch. The park previously featured a wave action swimming pool and food pavilion (non-operational since 2020). It is currently home to an 18-hole regulation golf course and the Marshlands Museum and Nature Center. It has a three-mile (5 km) shoreline along Lake Erie and is a popular bird-watching site. The children's play area, located near the abandoned Wave Pool, previously consisted of a child-size city before being reconstructed into a modernized playground.

== Bike and nature trails ==
=== Hike/bike trails ===
As part of the Downriver Linked Greenways trail system, a 3-mile segment of the trail runs through the park, with one branch of the trail terminating at Lee Road on the south end of the park, with the trail leaving the park at South Gibraltar Road on the north end. From here, one branch of the trail continues north through Gibraltar and Trenton, while a separate one continues to the north and west through Rockwood and Flat Rock, as well as Oakwoods, Willow, and Lower Huron Metroparks. Within the park, a 3/4-mile trail extends north from the wave pool towards the Marshlands Museum and Nature Center.

=== Nature trails ===
The park also contains approximately 2.75 miles of nature trails in the northeast portion along Lake Erie. One pathway runs in a loop primarily through forests and alongside marsh and canals, while a second path begins down a boardwalk through marshes, transitioning into scattered wooded areas along the Lake Erie coast.

== Boating, kayaking, and canoeing ==
=== Launches ===
The park offers several different options for launching large and small crafts. On the south side of the park is the Lake Erie Metropark Marina, located at the end of Lee Road, which serves primarily larger boats. On the opposite side of the park near the nature trails, a boat ramp serves smaller boats and includes spaces to launch canoes and kayaks.

=== Waterways ===
In addition to Lake Erie, a number of smaller waterways surround the park.

- To the north and northeast, various canals and waterways wind through both nearby marshes and residential areas in the City of Gibraltar.
- Slightly to the northeast, Lake Erie narrows into the Detroit River, which continues northward on the east and west sides of Grosse Ile.
- At the extreme southern end of the park, the Huron River empties into Lake Erie at the Pointe Mouille State Game Area.
- Within the park, several smaller canals lead into marshes, in which a wide variety of waterfowl and aquatic plants live.

== Nearby Places ==
Lake Erie Metropark is located in Brownstown Charter Township, Michigan. It lies south of Gibraltar, Michigan, and numerous other downriver communities, and across the Trenton Channel to the southwest of Grosse Ile. To the west are the communities of South Rockwood, Rockwood, and Flat Rock, and on the opposite side of the mouth of the Huron River is the Pointe Mouille State Game Area, Berlin Charter Township, and Estral Beach.

Three other parks in the Huron–Clinton Metroparks system (Oakwoods, Willow, and Lower Huron Metroparks) are located to the northwest. Together, the four parks are connected by bike trails through the Downriver Linked Greenways system.

== Gallery ==
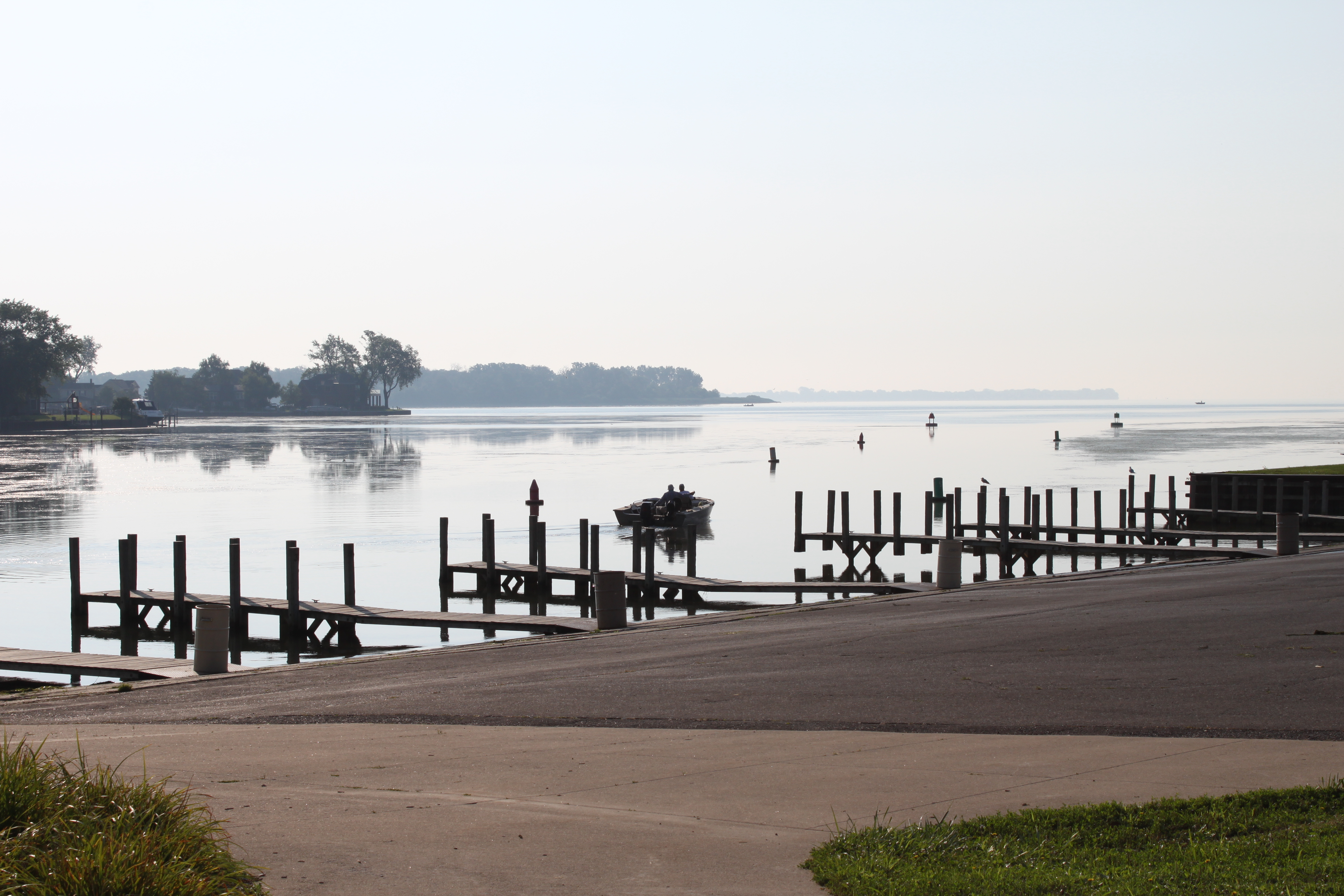
Boat launch

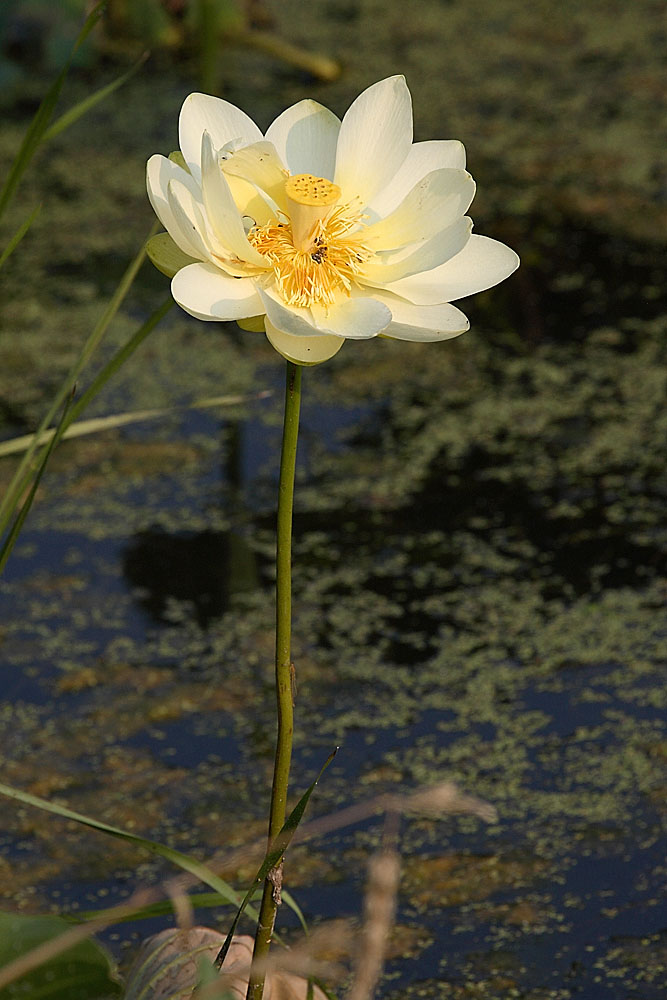
Nelumbo lutea
