= Huron Meadows Metropark =

Park in Michigan, U.S.

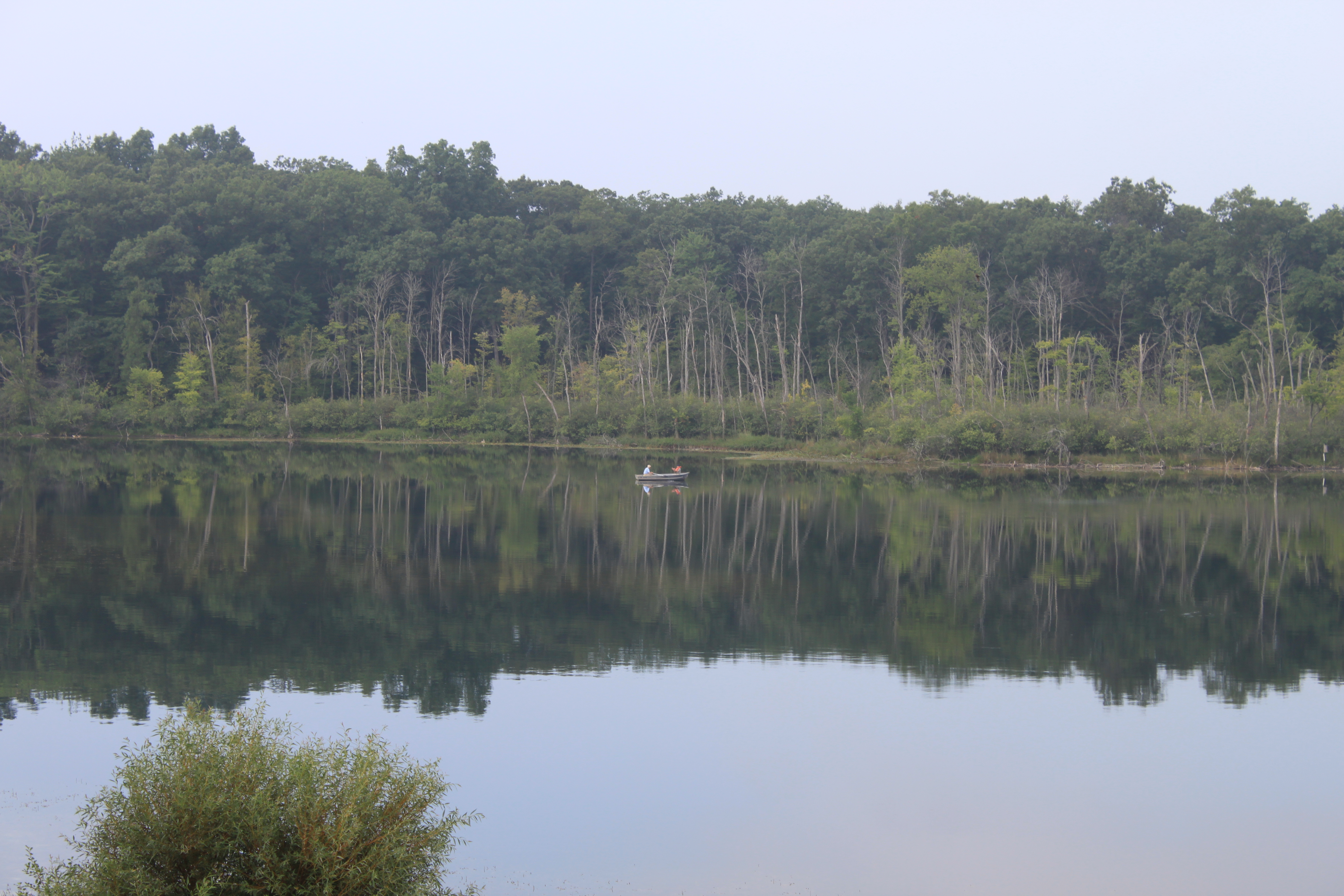
- Fishing on Huron River

- Location within Huron-Clinton Metroparks
- Type: Regional park
- Location: Lower Peninsula, Livingston County, Michigan USA
- Coordinates: 42°28′58.89″N 83°46′26.67″W
- Area: 1,576 acres (638 ha)
- Operator: Huron–Clinton Metroparks
- Status: Open year round
- Website: Official site

Huron Meadows Metropark is a park in the Huron-Clinton system of metro parks. The park covers 1,576 acres (6.38 km^{2}) along the Huron River. It has a regulation golf course, hike-bike trails and self-guided nature trails. In the winter, the park has cross-country skiing and ice-fishing.

== Gallery ==
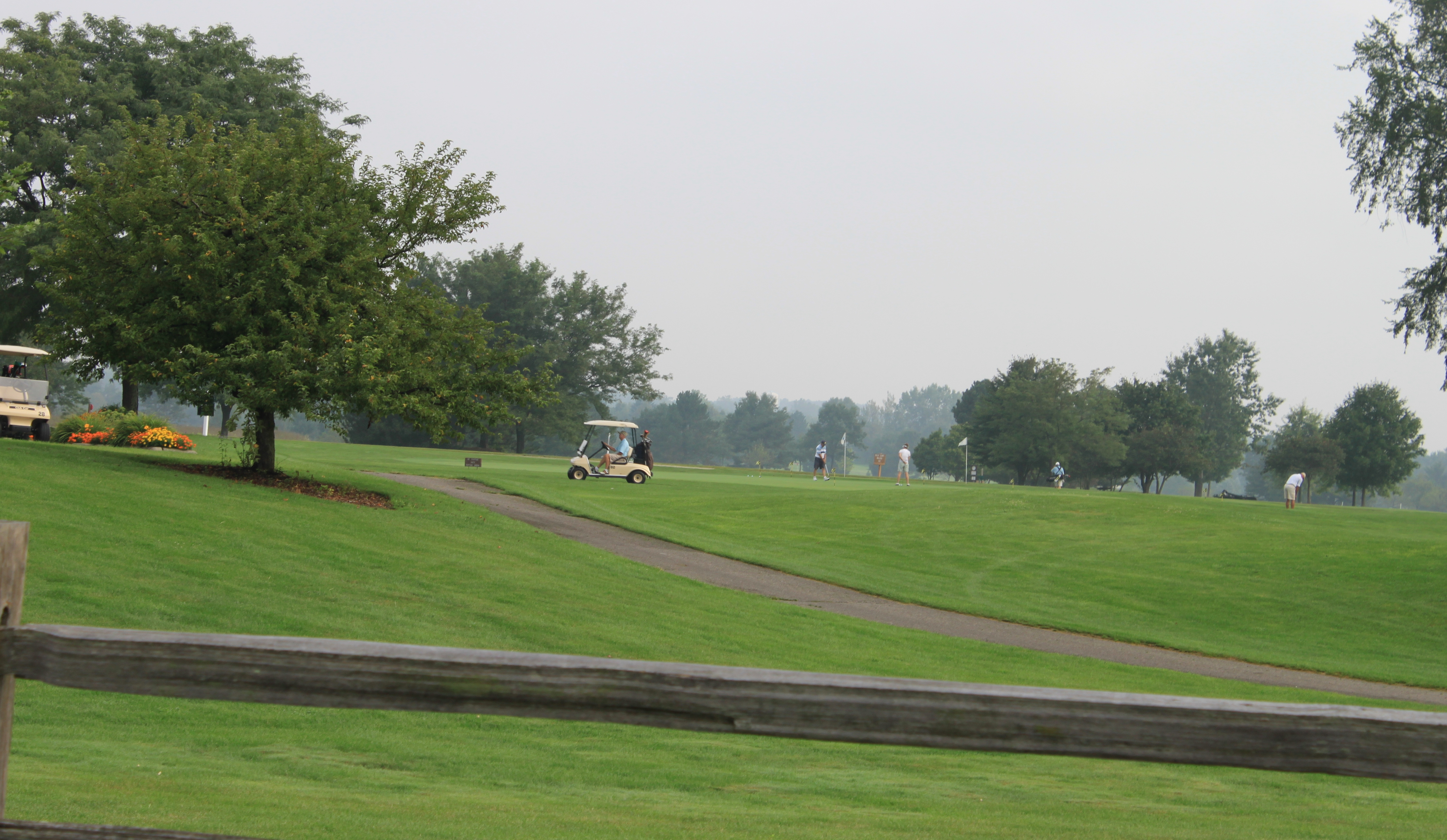
Golf course

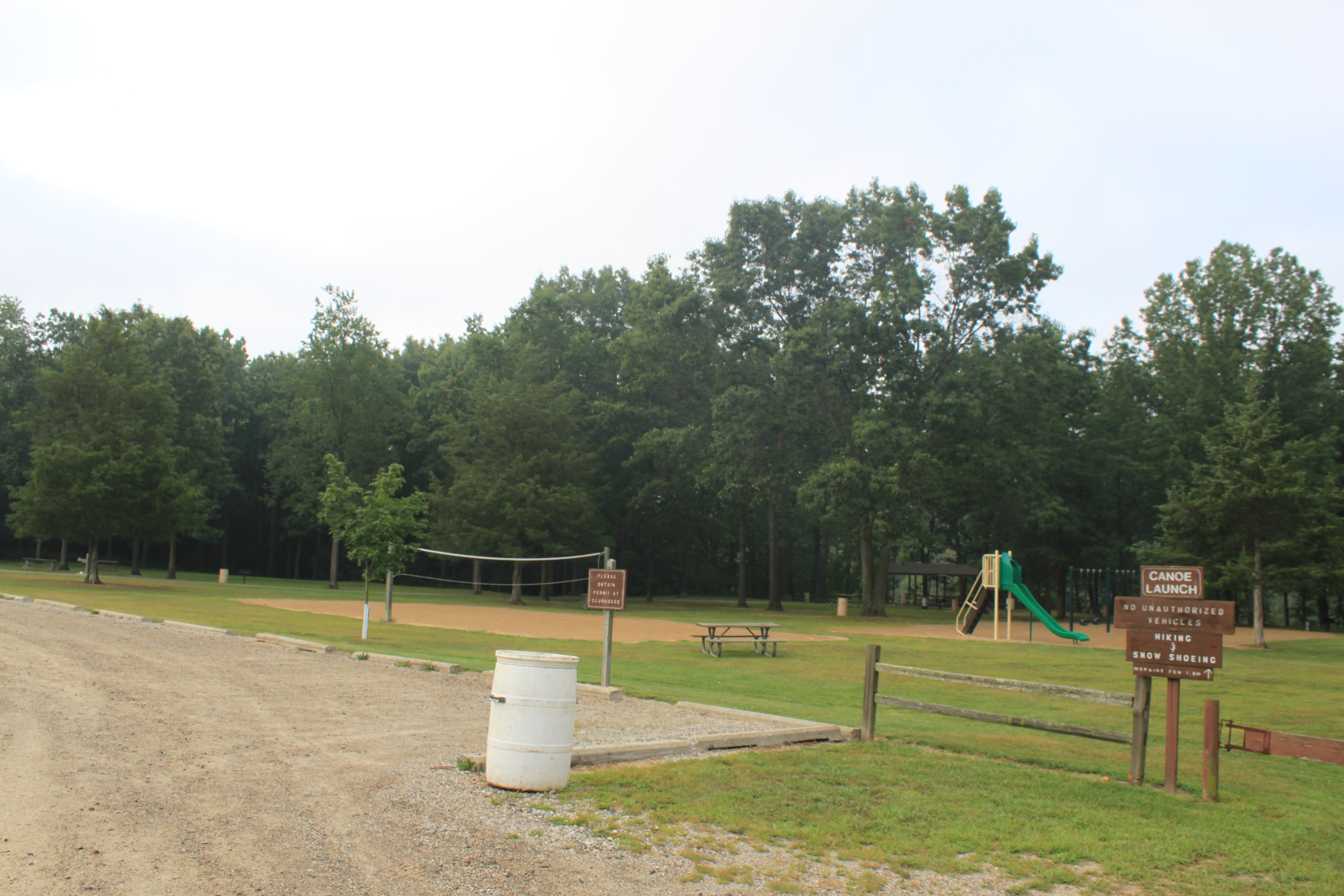
Cedar Ridge picnic area
