= Interstate 275 (Michigan) =

Interstate Highway in Michigan, United States

Interstate 275
- I-275 highlighted in red, the segment unrecognized by FHWA in purple

Route information
- Auxiliary route of I-75
- Maintained by MDOT
- Length: 35.026 mi (56.369 km) 29.97 miles (48.23 km) according to FHWA
- Existed: January 14, 1977–present
- NHS: Entire route

Major junctions
- South end: I-75 near Monroe
- US 24 near Carleton; I-94 in Romulus; US 12 in Canton; I-96 / M-14 near Livonia
- North end: I-96 / I-696 / M-5 in Farmington Hills

Location
- Country: United States
- State: Michigan
- Counties: Monroe, Wayne, Oakland

Highway system
- Interstate Highway System; Main; Auxiliary; Suffixed; Business; Future; Michigan State Trunkline Highway System; Interstate; US; State; Byways
← M-247	→ M-294

Interstate 275 (I-275) is an auxiliary Interstate Highway in the US state of Michigan that acts as a western bypass of the Detroit metropolitan area. The Michigan Department of Transportation (MDOT) maintains the highway as part of the larger State Trunkline Highway System. The freeway runs through the western suburbs near Detroit Metropolitan Wayne County Airport, and crosses several rivers and rail lines in the area. The southern terminus is the interchange with I-75 near Newport, northeast of Monroe. MDOT considers the Interstate to run to an interchange with I-96, I-696 and M-5 on the Farmington Hills–Novi city line, running concurrently with I-96 for about five miles (8.0 km). This gives a total length of about 35.03 miles (56.38 km), which is backed up by official signage. According to the Federal Highway Administration (FHWA), the length is 29.97 miles (48.23 km) because that agency considers I-275 to end at the junction with I-96 and M-14 along the boundary between Livonia and Plymouth Township. All other map makers, like the American Automobile Association, Rand McNally and Google Maps follow MDOT's practice.

A highway roughly parallel to the modern I-275 was included in early planning maps for the Interstate Highway System in the 1950s. As plans developed through the 1960s and into the early 1970s, the freeway was to run from I-75 near Newport north to Novi and connect back to I-75 near Davisburg. Some plans in the 1970s had the northern Novi–Davisburg section numbered as a state highway M-275. The southern half of I-275 was built in segments that were completed in January 1977. Later that month, the state canceled the northern section because of local opposition. A later attempt to revive the proposal failed in 1979. Additional plans to complete M-275 through Oakland County were kept on the drawing boards through the 1980s, but failed to materialize. M-5 (Haggerty Connector) opened along part of the former I-275/M-275 right-of-way between 1994 and 2000.

== Route description ==
I-275 begins at exit 20 along I-75 in northeastern Monroe County near the community of Newport. The freeway angles to the northwest and crosses US Highway 24 (US 24), which is also called Telegraph Road. After this interchange, I-275 turns to the north, running east of Carleton, crossing the Canadian National Railway and Conrail Shared Assets lines north of exit 5. At Will Carleton Road, the trunkline crosses into Wayne County. There it continues on a northerly path parallel to a CSX Transportation line through southern Wayne County. The freeway crosses the Huron River at South Huron Road, adjacent to Willow Metropark.

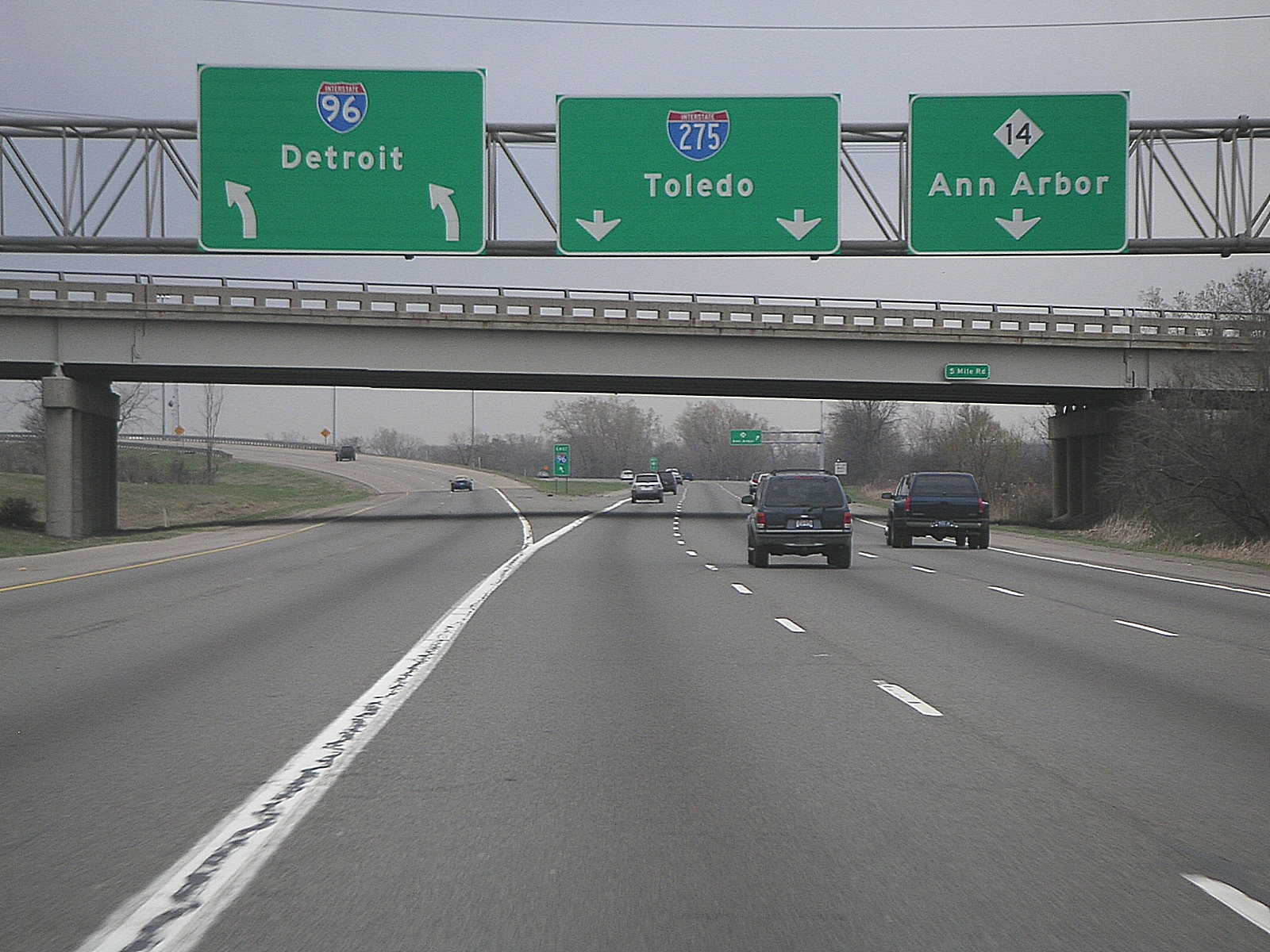
I-275 southbound where it splits from I-96 and meets M-14

In the city of Romulus, I-275 Detroit Metropolitan Wayne County Airport. There is access to the south side of the airport signed at Eureka Road and to the north side at I-94. Between these two interchanges, I-275 begins to run to the northwest. South of I-94, the highway crosses over the same CSX line and a Norfolk Southern Railway (NS) line and north of I-94, it passes a campus of Wayne County Community College and the headquarters of the Visteon Corporation, a major auto parts supplier spun off from Ford Motor Company. Near these two complexes, the freeway turns north again, running parallel and to the east of Haggerty Road. The freeway crosses over another railroad line also used by Amtrak trains from Chicago and Pontiac, US 12 (Michigan Avenue) and M-153 (Ford Road) in Canton. US 12 (Michigan Avenue) and M-153 (Ford Road). I-275 crosses the Lower Branch of the River Rouge north of Michigan Avenue and the Middle Branch north of Ford Road, and it also crosses over a CSX line again. North of the Middle Branch of the River Rouge in Plymouth Township, I-275 crosses Schoolcraft Road and another CSX line from Detroit.

The interchange with I-96 (Jeffries Freeway) on the border between Plymouth Township and Livonia is where the FHWA considers I-275 to end as they do not note any overlap with I-96, however MDOT continues the designation on maps and signage to run concurrently with I-96 northward. I-96 merges from the east on the Jeffries Freeway and turns north; from the west, the M-14 freeway merges and ends. At the time the freeway from this interchange northward to Farmington Hills was opened to traffic, it was dual signed as I-96/I-275, and the unbuilt segment of freeway from Novi to Davisburg that was to be either I-275 or M-275 was still an active proposal. I-275 is shown running concurrently with I-96 through Livonia and Farmington Hills on MDOT maps, and other map makers and mapping service providers such as the American Automobile Association, Rand McNally and Google Maps label their maps in accordance with MDOT and not FHWA.

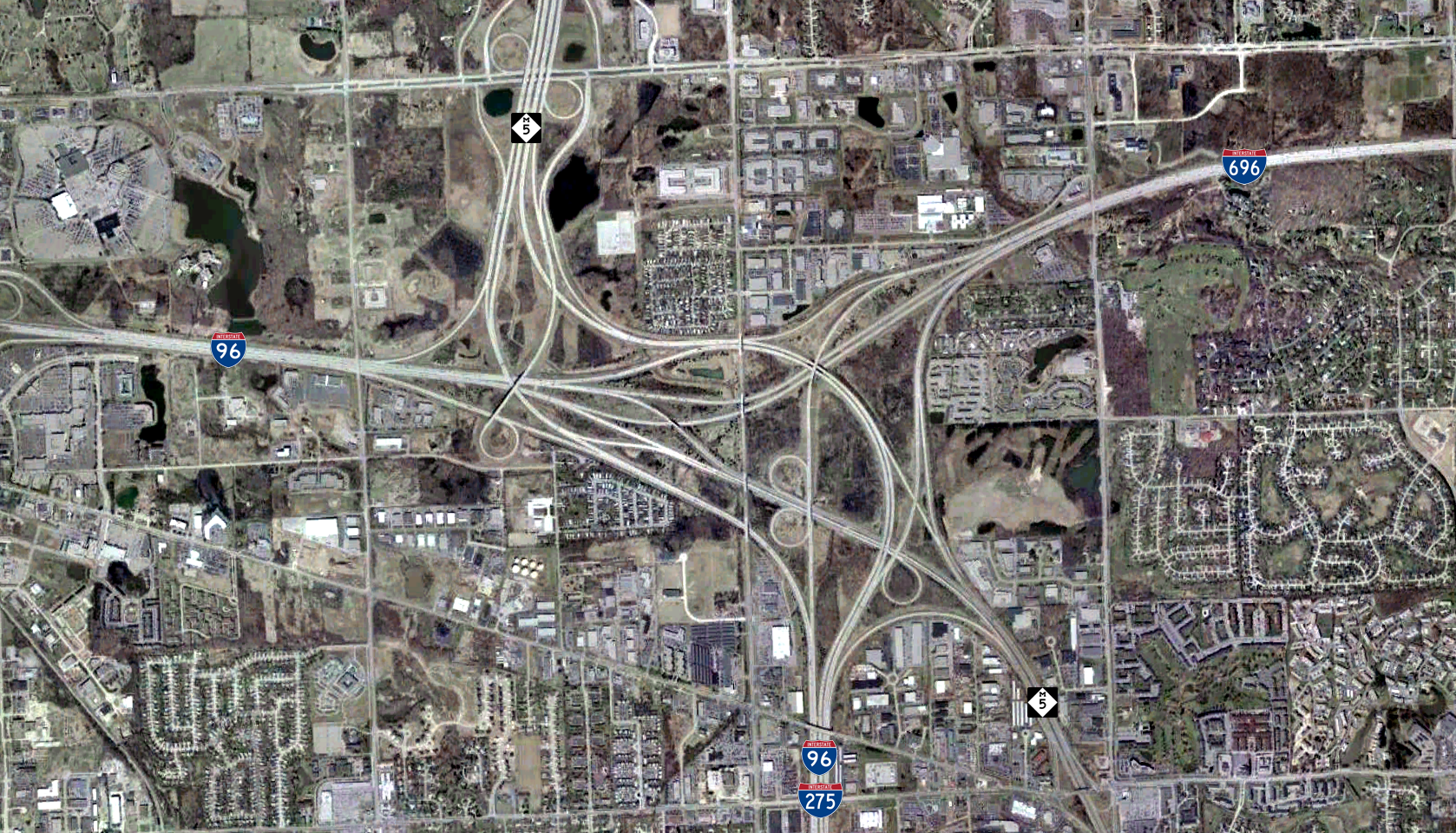
Mixing Bowl interchange that marks the northern end of I-275

North of the interchange with the Jeffries Freeway, the combined I-96/I-275 curves to the east into Livonia, running parallel to Haggerty Road and continuing through suburban areas. The freeway has interchanges with 6 Mile and 7 Mile roads in the northwest corner of Livonia. I-96/I-275 passes through an interchange with 8 Mile Road while crossing into Oakland County and entering the southwest corner of Farmington Hills. North of 10 Mile Road, I-96/I-275 crosses Grand River Avenue. Here the ramps start to connect with both directions of M-5, the start of eastbound I-696 or the continuation of westbound I-96. MDOT ends the I-275 designation at this massive interchange.

== History ==
=== Original plans ===
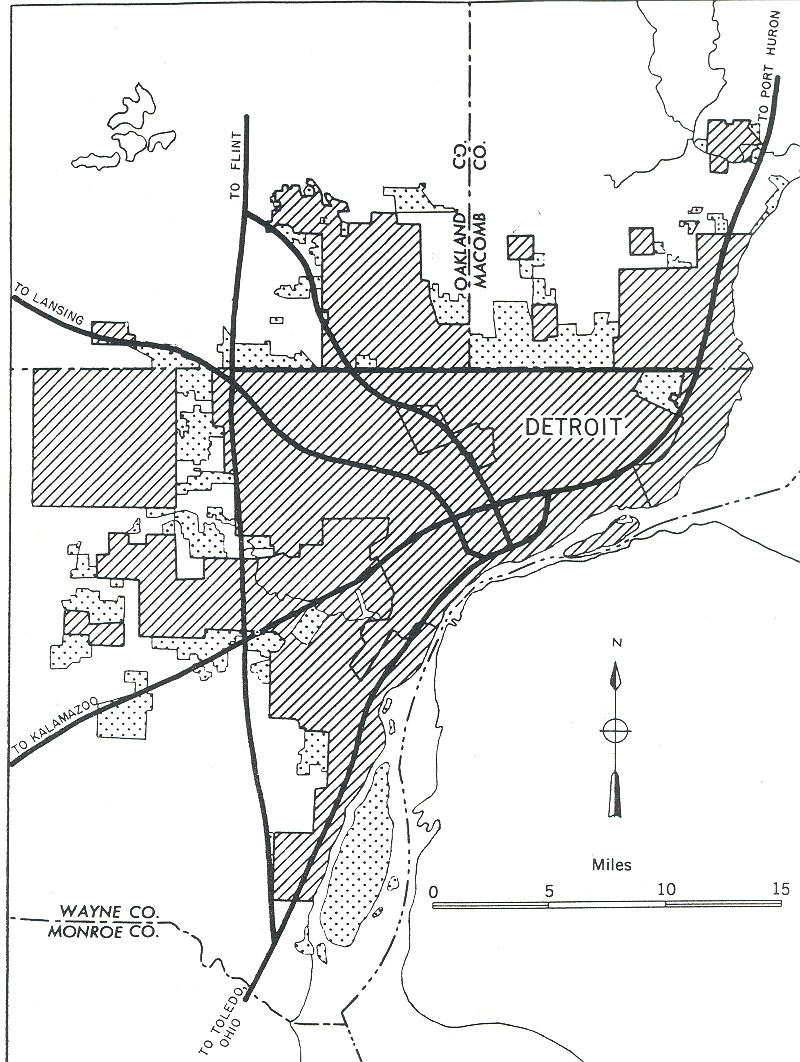
Planning map for the Detroit area freeways from 1955

A north–south freeway was originally planned as an Interstate Highway allowing through traffic to bypass the city of Detroit. This plan was included in the 1955 General Location of National System of Interstate Highways (Yellow Book), an early proposal for what would become the Interstate Highway System. The Yellow Book contained an inset of the proposed freeways in and around the Detroit area including a north–south freeway east of the current I-275 corridor. The 1958 numbering plan for Michigan submitted by the State Highway Department had this route initially marked as I-73. William Swanson in the MDOT Highway Planning Unit later stated that the department also planned to reverse the numbering of I-75 and I-275 between Newport and Davisburg; I-75 would have bypassed downtown Detroit just as it bypassed downtown Flint and downtown Saginaw to the north, and the auxiliary number (I-275) would have been used on the freeway through downtown Detroit.

The present-day freeway was built in stages in the mid-1970s. In 1974, the state highway map of the time showed the highway under construction, but no parts completed. The first four miles (6.4 km) of the freeway were shown opened to traffic from M-153 (Ford Road) in Canton to Schoolcraft Avenue (just south of the I-96 and M-14 interchange) in Plymouth Township by the start of 1975. The segment between US 24 and I-75 in Monroe County was open as well. The second phase was completed in the latter half of 1976, when I-275 was extended north from Schoolcraft Avenue (and the incomplete interchange with the future route of I-96) to the I-96/I-696 interchange in Novi. Then on January 14, 1977, the remaining 23-mile (37 km) section of I-275 between US 24 in Monroe County and M-153 in Canton Township was opened to traffic, completing the current freeway. The final cost to build the I-275 freeway was $145 million (equivalent to $584 million in 2024).

=== Cancellation of northern segment ===
The Michigan State Highway Commission canceled the northern section of the highway, originally planned to continue northward from Novi to a point near Davisburg and Clarkston, on January 26, 1977, after it spent $1.6 million (equivalent to $6.85 million in 2024) the year before purchasing land for the roadway. This northern section was not planned as an Interstate Highway at that time, bearing the designation M-275 instead. Opposition to construction came from various citizens' groups and different levels of local government. Additionally, both The Detroit News and Detroit Free Press opposed the project. The Detroit City Council, led by then-Chairman Carl Levin, opposed the plan. Levin said at the time, "At last I think people are waking up to the dangers of more and more expressways. At some point we've got to say enough. And I think we've reached it." The US Department of the Interior reviewed the state's environmental impact study of the project and stated that the project, "will cause irreparable damages on recreation lands, wetlands, surface waters and wildlife habitat". The total project to link Farmington Hills with Davisburg with the 24-mile (39 km) extension would have cost $69.5 million (equivalent to $280 million in 2024) and saved drivers an estimated eight minutes off travel time around the city of Detroit.

=== I-96 overlap ===
The Jeffries Freeway project was in its final stages of construction in 1977, linking the final 10.5 miles (16.9 km) of I-96 at M-39 (Southfield Freeway) with the I-275 freeway. After it was completed, I-96 was routed to run concurrently with I-275 between Novi and Plymouth Township, and the segments of freeway through Farmington and Farmington Hills that were to be part of I-96 instead became part of an extended M-102.

At the end of the 1970s, MDOT took part in a FHWA-backed initiative called the Positive Guidance Demonstration Project, and the two agencies audited signage practices in the vicinity of the I-96/M-37 and I-296/US 131 interchange in Walker near Grand Rapids. MDOT determined that usage of the I-296 designation overlapping US 131 was "a potential source of confusion for motorists". FHWA agreed with the department's proposal to eliminate all signage and public map references to the designation in April 1979. MDOT then received formal permission from the American Association of State Highway and Transportation Officials (AASHTO) on October 13, and from the FHWA on December 3, 1979, to remove the redundant highway designation from signage and most maps.

Following this program, the Reflective Systems Unit at MDOT reviewed the state of two- and three-way concurrencies along the highway system in Michigan. They approached the department's Trunkline Numbering Committee and the district traffic and safety engineers on October 19, 1982, for proposals to reduce or eliminate the various overlapping designations to "avoid driver confusion and save funds". Included on the initial discussion report was the I-96/I-275 concurrency with a request for comments by November 5 of that year. When the unit released its final recommendations on March 17, 1983, no changes were proposed regarding the I-96/I-275 concurrency. Other recommendations, such as removing US 2 and US 10 from overlaps with I-75 were implemented in later in 1983 and in 1985, respectively.

=== New extension plan ===
M-275
- Location: Oakland County
- History: Never built; proposed from c. 1975 to c. May 1985

At least one transportation study in the early 1970s identified the highway north of Novi as M-275. The Oakland County Road Commission, local land developers, and local politicians supported building a highway along the route of M-275 to open up the area for development. After the January 1977 cancelation of M-275 as a full freeway, the state explored building the highway as a parkway instead. This parkway concept allowed at-grade intersections that would have not been permitted had the highway been built as a full freeway, and it included more landscaping and less grade separation. In September 1977, the State Transportation Commission ordered MDOT to study alternatives to a freeway in the area, along with the possible widening of I-94 and US 23 and the improvement of local roads to handle increased traffic caused by the absence of an extended I-275 from the state's freeway network.

The canceled highway project was revisited by the State Transportation Commission in 1979 as M-275. The renewed interest came after a vote of local residents showed a desire for the road. The Michigan Department of State Highways and Transportation backed the proposal with the support of local officials around the highway and the highway lobby. The 22-year-old proposal was deemed "necessary" by the department to alleviate highway congestion along other area highways. The US Department of the Interior continued to oppose the highway on environmental grounds. M-275 would have cut through Dodge No. 4 State Park in Oakland County if completed. Another factor that helped sink the project was the rising costs. Estimates in 1979 placed a $100 million (equivalent to $348 million in 2024) price tag on the project.

Despite funding increases for MDOT by the State Legislature, M-275 languished on the drawing boards. New plans in 1983 had addressed several of the environmental concerns by moving interchanges and rerouting around wetlands. These plans even canceled an extension of Northwestern Highway (then M-4, now part of M-10) to Pontiac Trail and a connection with M-275. The state increased MDOT's budget by $602 million (equivalent to $1.59 billion in 2024), but left the M-275 project off a priority list. The Southeast Michigan Council of Governments (SEMCOG) continued to factor M-275 into regional transportation planning forecasts. SEMCOG's position was that the location population that would be served by the new highway would rival 70 of Michigan's counties combined, yet there was no four-lane highways through the area. Opponents cited urban sprawl, which SEMCOG dismissed because the population was already in the area of the new highway. Transportation planners at an April 24, 1985, meeting of the West Bloomfield Republicans said that the highway extension "would make sense" but MDOT "is planning no new freeways and no major road construction" at the time. By the next month, MDOT had relinquished ownership of right-of-way in West Bloomfield Township, ending any further progress at building the roadway. Studies comparing the levels of traffic at various checkpoints along the existing I-275 showed that the freeway was only handling half of its rated capacity. At 8 Mile Road, the freeway carried 57,000 vehicles in 1977 and 88,000 vehicles in 1984. This compared to a 1986 projection of 133,000 vehicles daily.

After many years of inactivity, further work began along this same route to relieve traffic congestion in the area, but the resulting highway was designated as a part of M-5 rather than I-275 or M-275. The first section of this freeway extension was opened in October 1994. This extended a freeway from I-275's previous terminus at I-96/I-696 north to 12 Mile Road. A plan enacted by then-Governor John Engler in 1995 angered road officials when funding was diverted from county road commissions to help complete state highway projects like the M-5 (Haggerty Connector) project. In 1999, a second extension of M-5 was completed to 14 Mile Road, but only as an expressway. The final two miles (3.2 km) between 14 Mile Road and Pontiac Trail opened to traffic on November 1, 2002.

=== Bike trail ===
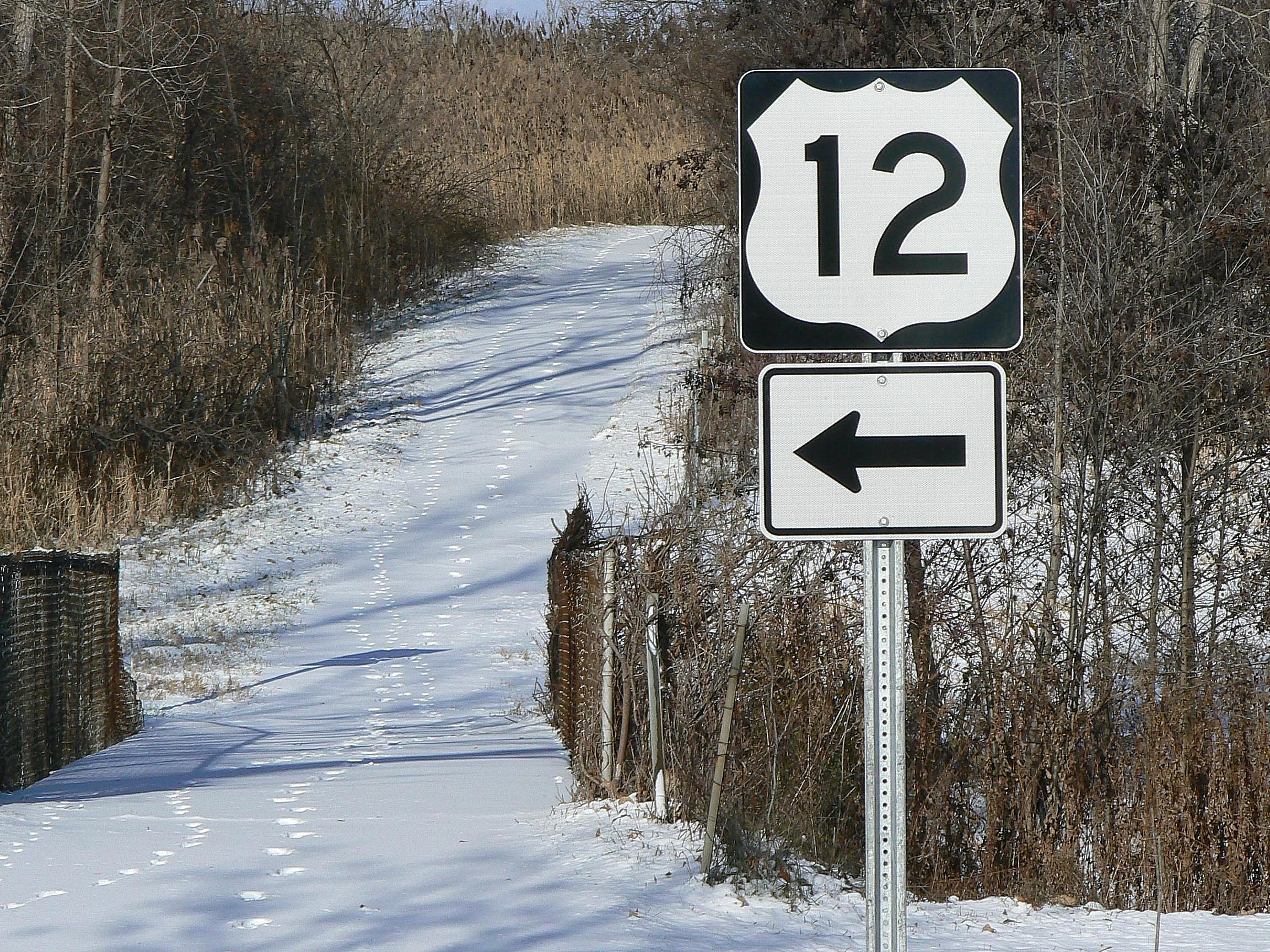
I-275 Metro Trail in Canton, December 2008

In the mid-1970s, MDOT constructed a bike trail parallel to I-275 in response to the energy crisis. Since 2006, the Michigan Trails & Greenway Alliance and MDOT have been working to improve the bike trail. At the time of the alliance's initial studies, the trail was overgrown with vegetation in locations. Since a grand re-opening in 2011, the bike path has been called the I-275 Metro Trail. In the middle of 2015, MDOT completed reconstruction of the bike trail, resulting in a paved trail from a junction with the Downriver Linked Greenways East–West Trail near South Huron Road in Huron Township northward to 12 Mile Road in Novi.

== Exit list ==
County	Location	mi	km	Exit	Destinations	Notes
Monroe	Frenchtown Township	0.000	0.000	—	I-75 / LECT – Detroit, Toledo	Exit 20 on I-75
Monroe	Frenchtown Township	2.070	3.331	2	US 24 (Telegraph Road)	
Monroe	Ash Township	5.454	8.777	5	Carleton, South Rockwood	Connects to Carleton Rockwood Road
Monroe–Wayne county line	Ash–Huron township line	7.650	12.311	8	Will Carleton Road – Flat Rock	
Wayne	Huron Township	10.664	17.162	11	South Huron Road	Signed southbound as exits 11A (east) and 11B (west); north access to Willow Metropark
Wayne	Huron Township	12.653	20.363	13	Sibley Road – New Boston	Provides access to Downriver
Wayne	Romulus	14.631	23.546	15	Eureka Road – Detroit Metro Airport	South airport access via John D. Dingell Drive
Wayne	Romulus	17.197	27.676	17	I-94 – Chicago, Ann Arbor, Detroit, Detroit Metro Airport	North airport access via Merriman Road; exit 194 on I-94
Wayne	Van Buren Township	19.869	31.976	20	Ecorse Road – Romulus	Connects to Willow Run Airport
Wayne	Canton	22.012	35.425	22	US 12 (Michigan Avenue) – Wayne, Ypsilanti	
Wayne	Canton	24.987	40.213	25	M-153 (Ford Road) – Canton, Westland	
Wayne	Plymouth Township	27.551	44.339	28	Ann Arbor Road – Plymouth, Livonia	
Wayne	Plymouth Township	29.388– 29.949	47.295– 48.198	29	I-96 east – Detroit M-14 west – Ann Arbor	Southern end of I-96 concurrency; exit not numbered for southbound traffic; exit numbers follow I-96's numbering from here northward; northern terminus of I-275 at northern I-96 merge point according to FHWA
Wayne	Livonia	31.217	50.239	170	6 Mile Road	
Wayne	Livonia	32.214	51.843	169	7 Mile Road	Signed as exits 169A (west) and 169B (east) northbound
Wayne–Oakland county line	Livonia–Farmington Hills city line-	33.272	53.546	167	8 Mile Road (Baseline Road) – Northville	
Oakland	Farmington Hills	35.026	56.369	165	I-96 west – Lansing I-696 east – Port Huron; M-5 (Grand River Avenue)	Northern end of I-96 concurrency at northern terminus of I-275; exit 1 on I-696
1.000 mi = 1.609 km; 1.000 km = 0.621 mi: Concurrency terminus
