= Flat Rock Dam (Michigan) =

Dam in Flat Rock, Michigan, U.S.

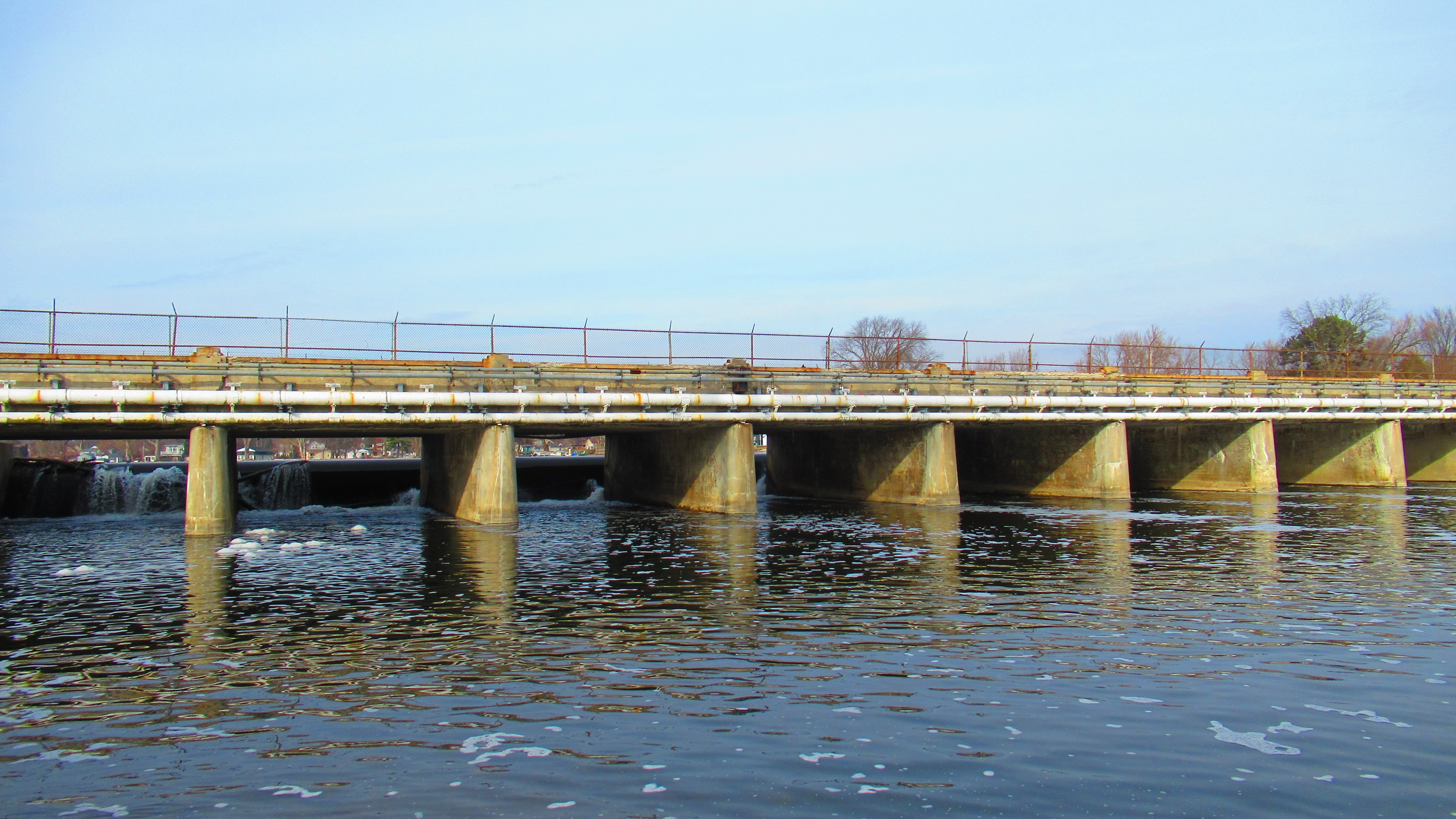
- Flat Rock Dam in December 2019

- Location within the state of Michigan
- Location: Huron River; Flat Rock, Michigan
- Coordinates: 42°05′59″N 83°17′44″W
- Purpose: Power
- Status: Decommissioned
- Opening date: 1924; 102 years ago
- Built by: Ford Motor Company
- Owner: Huron–Clinton Metropolitan Authority

Dam and spillways
- Type of dam: Gravity dam
- Impounds: Huron River
- Height: 13.5 ft (4.1 m)
- Length: 492 ft (150 m)
- Width (crest): 650 feet (198 m)

Reservoir
- Creates: Flat Rock Pond (or Flat Rock Impoundment)
- Total capacity: 188 acres (76 ha)

The Flat Rock Dam is a decommissioned hydroelectric gravity dam crossing the Huron River. It is located in the city of Flat Rock in Wayne County in the U.S. state of Michigan. The dam was built by the Ford Motor Company in 1924 for hydroelectricity for the nearby Ford Motor Company Lamp Factory, which remained in operation until 1950.

== Location ==
The Flat Rock Dam is about 9.8 miles (15.8 km) from the Huron River mouth at Lake Erie. It is the last sizable dam along the 130-mile-long (210 km) Huron River. The Huroc Dam is located about 900 feet (270 m) downstream, and it is a much smaller dam used for flood control. The river remains unobstructed after the Huroc Dam. The French Landing Dam is 18.4 miles (29.6 km) upstream. When the dam was completed, the resulting flooding created a reservoir of 188 acres (76 ha). The reservoir has no official name but is generally referred to as the Flat Rock Pond or the Flat Rock Impoundment.

The dam itself is not accessible to the public, and a railway bridge mostly obscures the view of the dam. While the reservoir is mostly inaccessible due to private land ownership and a lack of public access points, the area immediately south of the dam has been organized into a public park known as Huroc Park (sometimes spelled Hurock Park) on an artificially created island within the Huron River. A pedestrian bridge leads to the island and crosses the very small Huroc Dam, which is sometimes erroneously referred to as the Flat Rock Dam itself.

The dam is currently owned by the Huron–Clinton Metropolitan Authority. The Oakwoods Metropark division is located further upstream along a portion of the reservoir and is connected via trail to Huroc Park.

== Fishing ==
The immediate downstream area of the Flat Rock Dam is very popular among shore fishermen. The Michigan Department of Natural Resources stocks ten-of-thousands of rainbow trout along this stretch of river leading to Lake Erie. While the majority of trout exit into the lake, some return to the area for spawning. In 1997, a fish ladder was constructed at the dam to aid fish in spawning further upstream. Other fish within the Huron River at this point include northern pike, walleye, large and smallmouth bass, silver bass, channel catfish, bluegill, sunfish, and black crappie. Coho salmon, tiger muskellunge, and sheephead can also be found leading to the lake.

The Flat Rock Impoundment has a single listing on the state's Master Angler Entries documented by the Michigan Department of Natural Resources. The fish listed is a smallmouth bass measured at 24.25 inches (61.60 cm) caught and released in 2007.

== Health concerns ==
The Huron River is occasionally issued a "Do Not Eat" fish advisory by the Michigan Department of Health and Human Services when the waters accumulate high levels of cyanobacteria and perfluorooctanesulfonatecan (PFOS). When this bacteria is present, prolonged contact with the water is not advised, although occasional contact with PFOS is not considered a health concern. Fishermen are advised to catch and release only, and warning signs are posted at river access points. While the Flat Rock Dam and its reservoir are usually not specifically mentioned, the advisory is often issued for long stretches of the Huron River that include the Flat Rock Dam portion leading to the river mouth at Lake Erie.

== Gallery ==
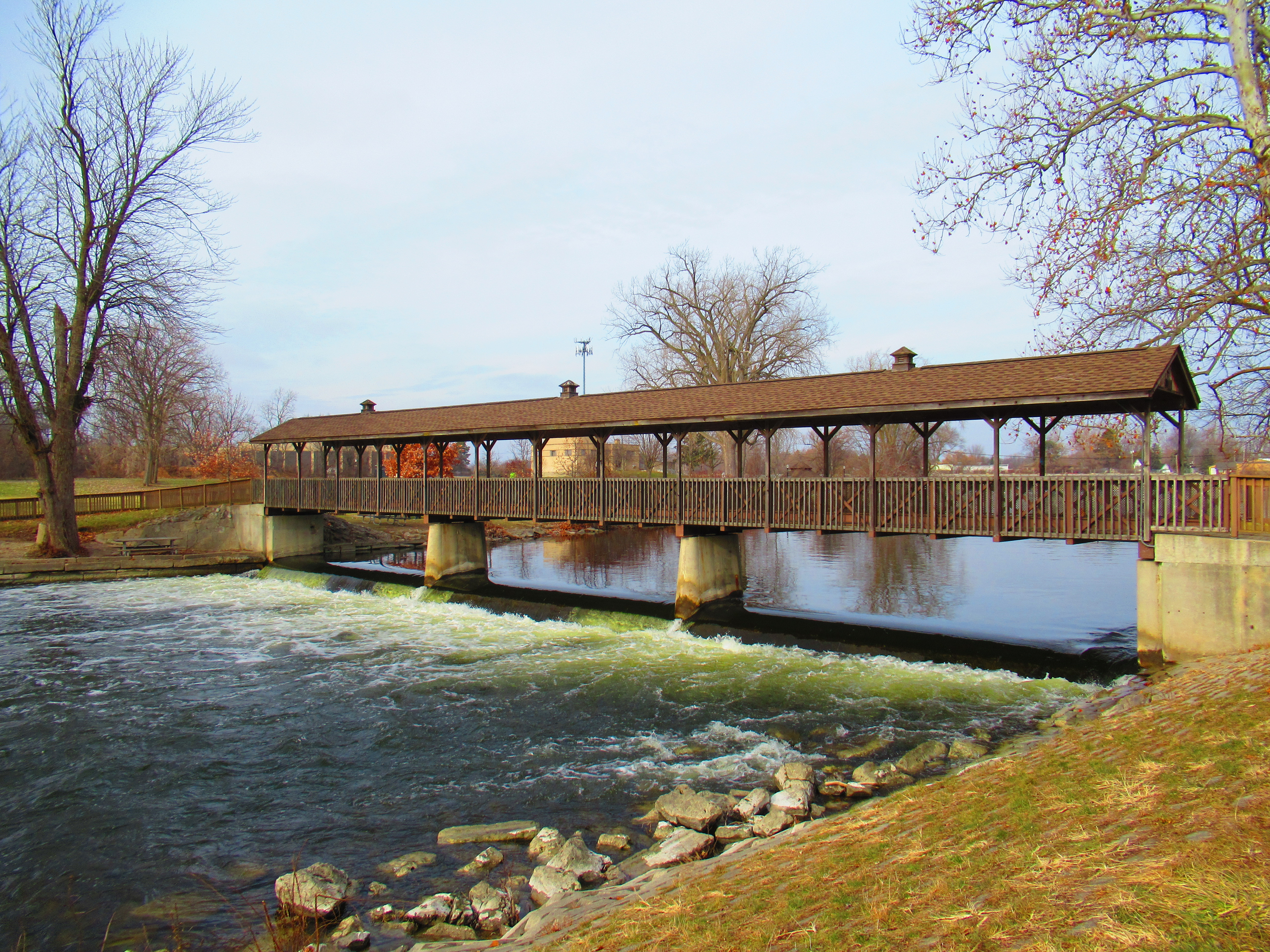
The smaller Huroc Dam about 900 feet (270 m) downstream

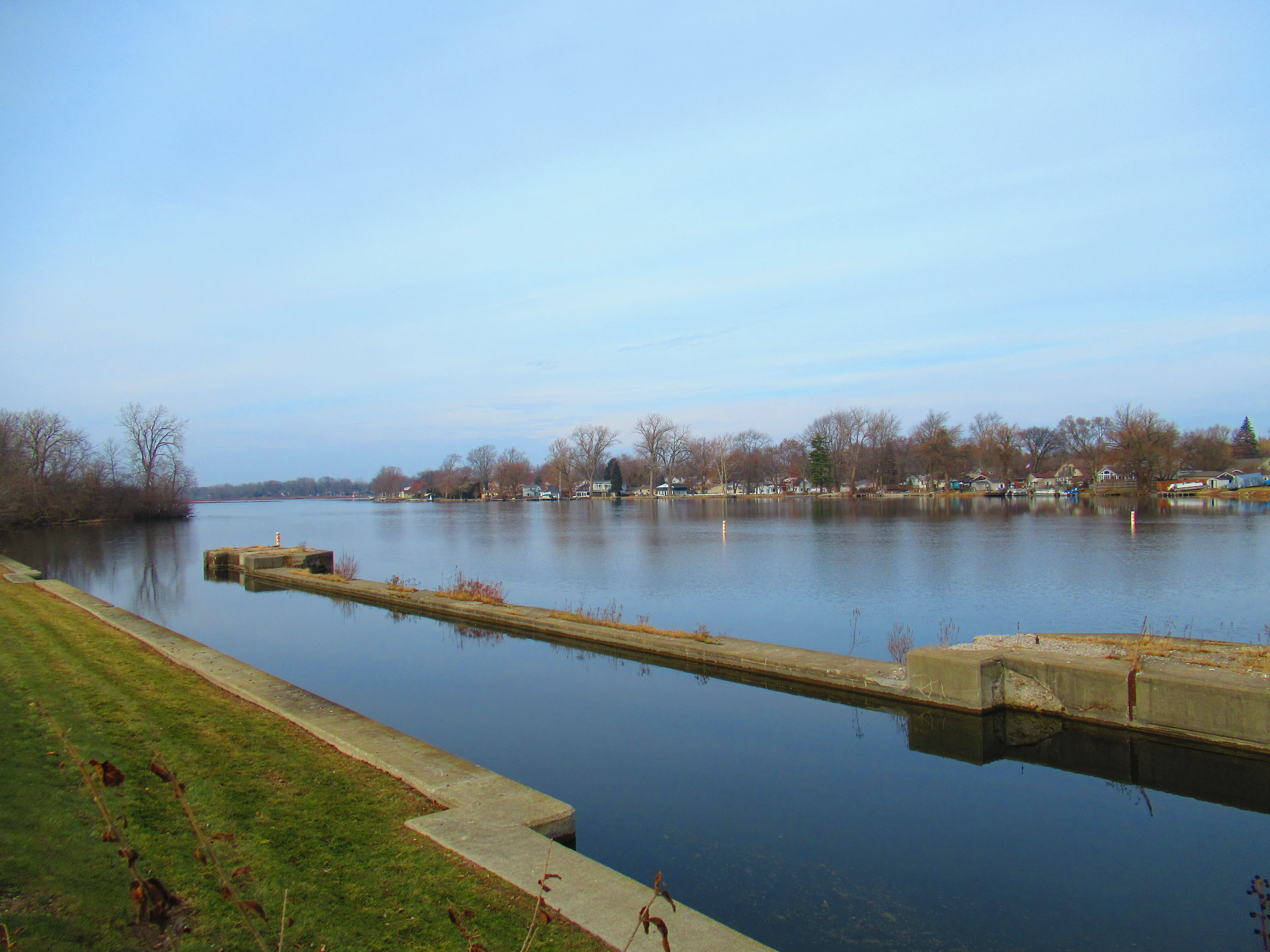
The fish ladder along the south bank of the dam

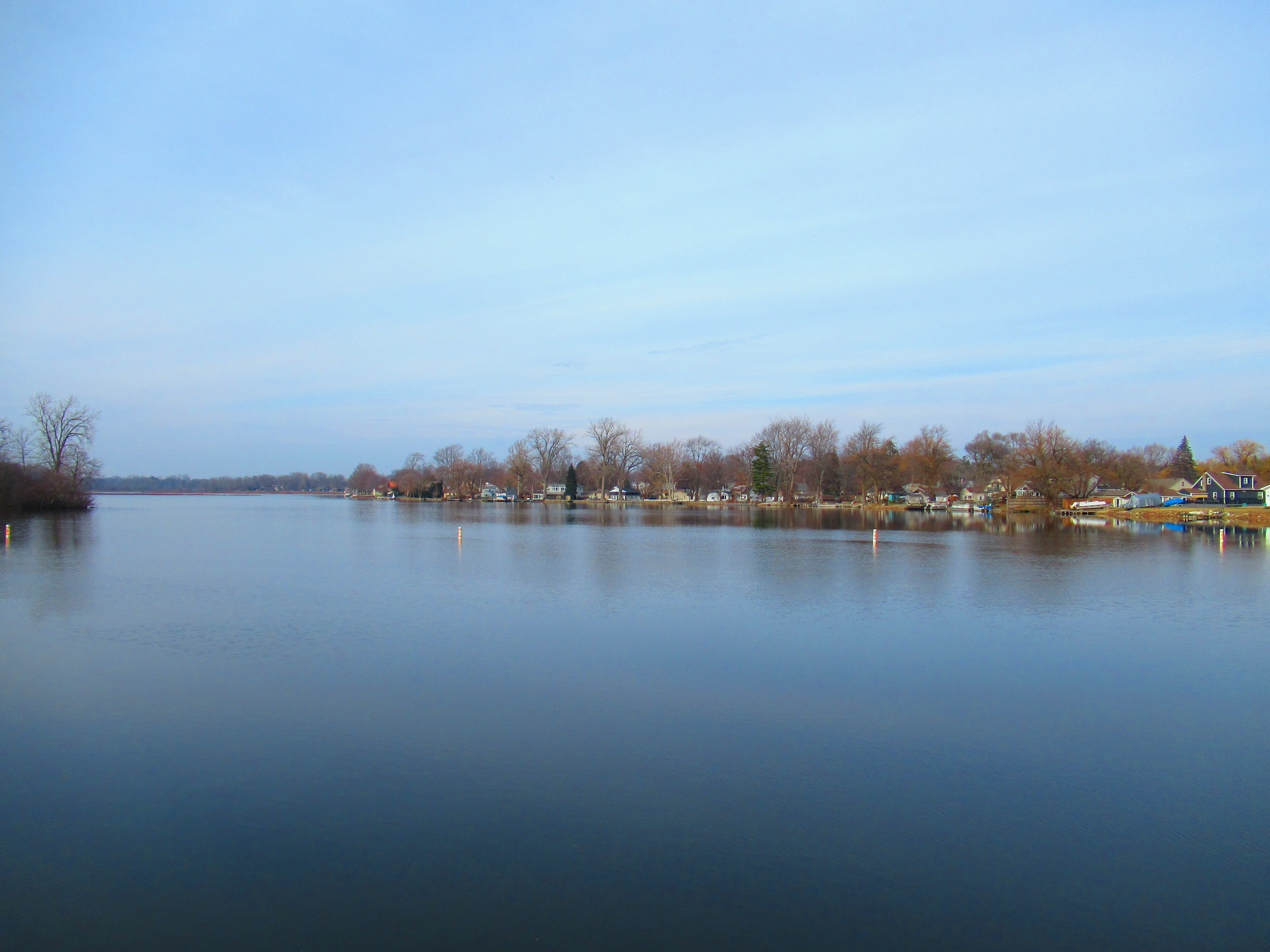
The construction of the dam created the Flat Rock Pond
