= Huron School District (Michigan) =

School district in Michigan

Address
- 32044 Huron River Drive New Boston, Wayne, Michigan, 48164; United States

District information
- Grades: Pre-Kindergarten-12
- Superintendent: Donovan Rowe
- Schools: 5
- Budget: $55,672,000 2022-2023 expenditures
- NCES District ID: 2618930

Students and staff
- Students: 2,489 (2024-2025)
- Teachers: 150.73 (on an FTE basis) (2024-2025)
- Staff: 325.55 FTE (2024-2025)
- Student–teacher ratio: 16.51 (2024-2025)

Other information
- Website: www.huronschools.org

Huron School District is a public school district in Metro Detroit. In Wayne County, Michigan, it serves parts of Huron Township and Sumpter Township. It also serves part of Ash Township in Monroe County.

== History ==
A high school has existed in New Boston since at least 1903, when it was reported in a newspaper that Toledo, Ohio mayor Samuel M. Jones gave a commencement speech.

Renton Junior High School was formerly Huron High School.

The current Huron High School was built in 1967. A bond issue to build a swimming pool, auditorium, and additions to other district buildings passed in 1975.

== Schools ==
Schools in Huron School District
School	Address	Notes
Huron High School	32044 W Huron River Drive, New Boston	Grades 9-12
Renton Junior High School	31578 Huron River Drive, New Boston	Grades 6-8
Brown Elementary	25485 Middlebelt Road, New Boston	Grades 1-5
Miller Elementary	18955 Hannan Road, New Boston	Grades 1-5
Ferguson Early Childhood Center	24678 Merriman Rd, New Boston	Grades PreK-K
