= Oakwoods Metropark =

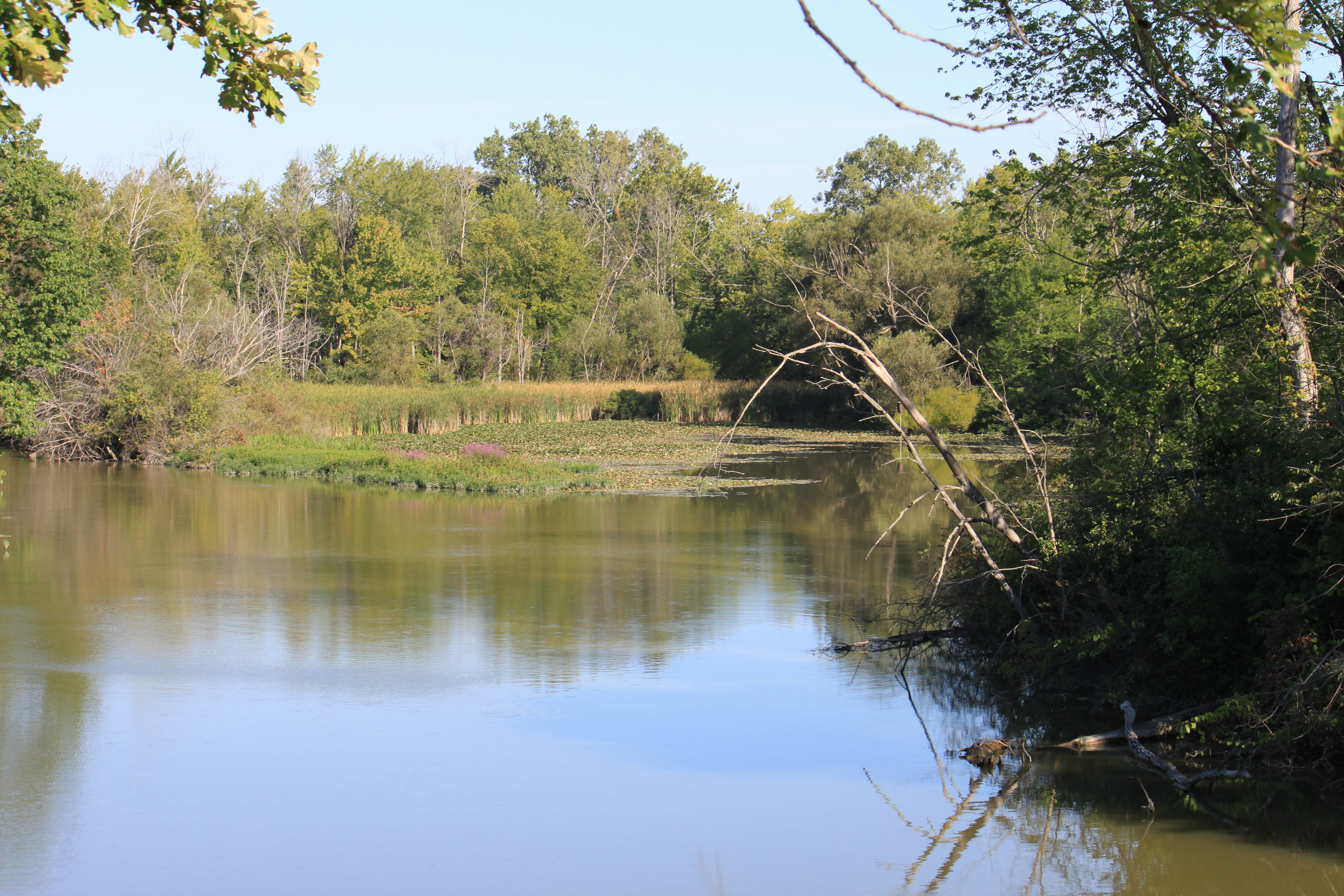
- View of Huron River

- Location within Huron-Clinton Metroparks
- Type: Regional park
- Location: 32911 Willow Road, Flat Rock, Michigan, United States, 48134
- Coordinates: 42°06′23.40″N 83°20′53.47″W
- Area: 1,756 acres (711 ha)
- Operator: Huron–Clinton Metroparks
- Status: Open year round
- Website: Official site

Oakwoods Metropark is a park in the Huron-Clinton Metroparks system, located along the Huron River near Flat Rock, Michigan. The park consists several miles of bike trails, numerous nature trails, horse trails, a canoe and kayak launch, and a Nature Center. It is directly connected to Willow and Lower Huron Metroparks, as well as Huroc Park through a branch of the Downriver Linked Greenways.

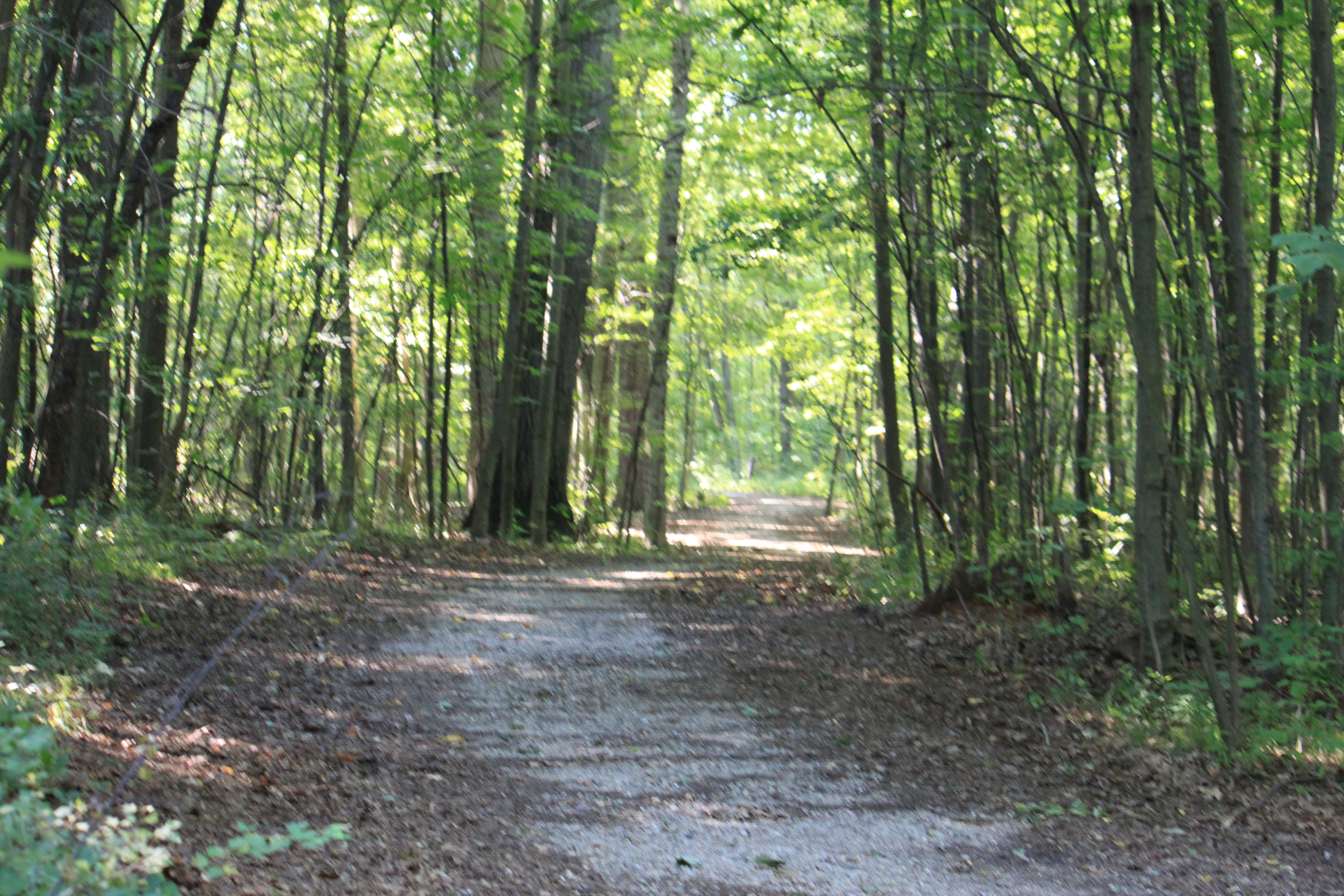
Nature Center nature trail

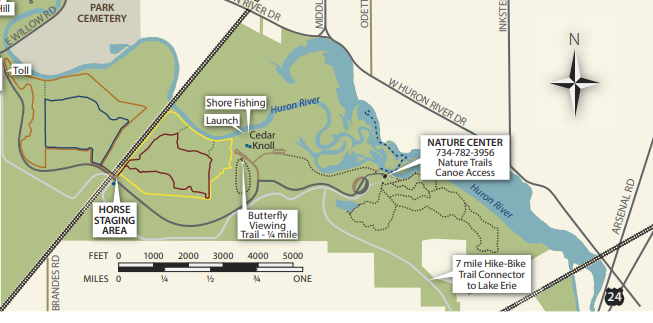
Map of all trails within Oakwoods Metropark.

== Bike trails ==
Approximately 3.75 miles of bike trails run within Oakwoods Metropark in total, all of which lies within the Downriver Linked Greenways system. The main trail connects the park with Willow and Lower Huron Metroparks to the north, and Huroc Park, the cities of Flat Rock and Rockwood, and Lake Erie Metropark to the east. A short extension also connects this trail to the Nature Center and nearby nature trails within the park.

== Nature trails ==
A number of nature trails of varying lengths can also be found near the Huron River, totaling slightly under 4 miles in length. These trails primarily traverse heavily wooded areas, with portions lining the bank of the river. Additionally, a one-mile water trail is designated along the Huron River for small crafts to navigate.

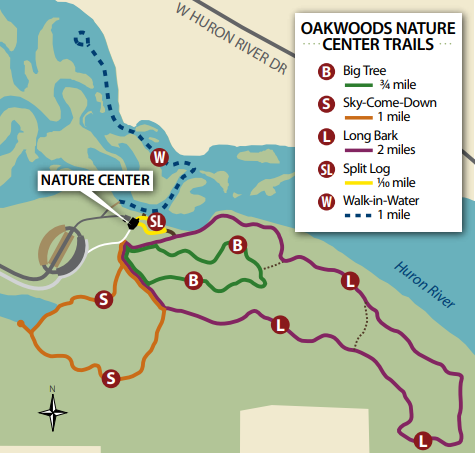
Map of nature trails and water trails within Oakwoods Metropark.

== Equestrian trails ==
A total of 7.75 miles of equestrian trails wind through the western portion of the park, all of which are exclusively for equestrian purposes and accessible through the horse staging area. A quarter-mile butterfly viewing trail can also be found nearby.

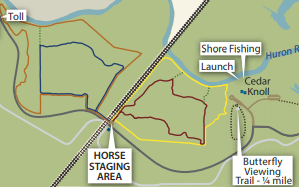
Map of equestrian trails within Oakwoods Metropark.

== Kayaking and canoeing ==
The park's only kayak and canoe launch is located behind the Nature Center on the Huron River. The river connects the park with Willow and Lower Huron Metroparks to the north, and Flat Rock and Lake Erie to the south (though the Flat Rock Dam makes navigability difficult). Due to the shallow depth of the river, motorized boats are generally unable to safely traverse this portion of the Huron River.

== Nearby places ==
Oakwoods Metropark is located in Flat Rock, Michigan, and within Huron Charter Township. It lies south of nearby Detroit Metro Airport, and slightly west of downtown Flat Rock. The park is located between Sumter Township to the west and Downriver communities such as Woodhaven and Trenton to the east, with the small village of Carleton a few miles to the south.

In relation to other parks in the Huron-Clinton Metroparks system, the park is slightly southeast of both Willow and Lower Huron Metroparks, and about 7 miles northwest of Lake Erie Metropark, to which Oakwoods Metropark is connected via hike/bike trail.
