= Willow Metropark =

Park in Wayne County, Michigan

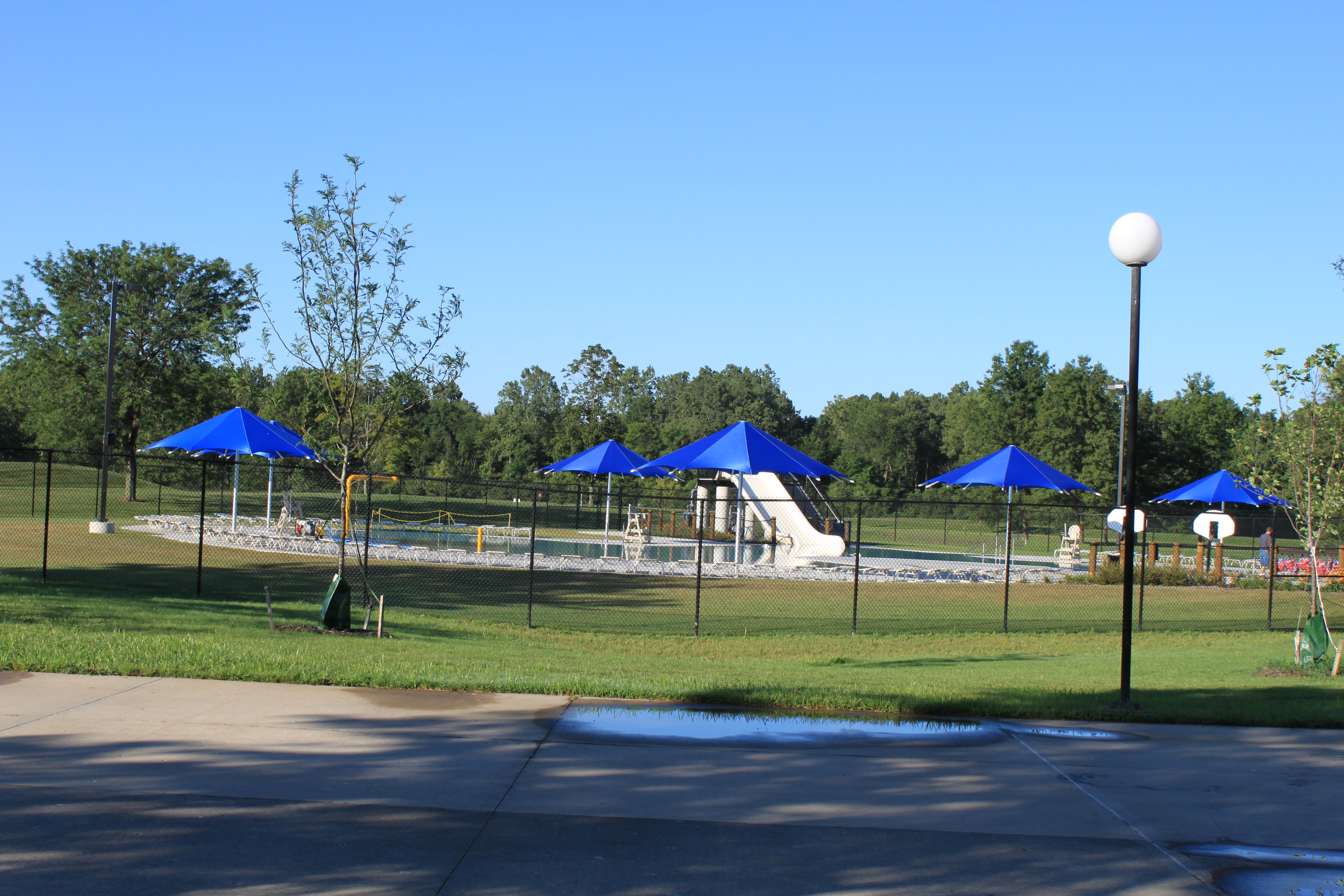
- Willow Pool

- Location within Huron-Clinton Metroparks
- Type: Regional park
- Location: 23200 S Huron Rd, New Boston, MI, United States, 48164
- Coordinates: 42°08′16.90″N 83°22′31.17″W
- Area: 1,531 acres (620 ha)
- Operator: Huron–Clinton Metroparks
- Status: Open year round
- Website: Official site

Willow Metropark is a park in the Huron-Clinton Metroparks system, located on the banks of the Huron River between Lower Huron Metropark to the northwest and Oakwoods Metropark to the southeast. The park consists of a wide variety of trails and recreational areas, including an 18-hole golf course, the 17-acre (69,000 m^{2}) Washago Pond, hike/bike trails, a disc golf course, a children's play area, a pool, and a kayak/canoe launch, in addition to groomed cross country ski trails in the winter months.

== Bike Trails ==
In total, approximately 4.5 miles of trails run through the park, all of which are part of the Downriver Linked Greenways System.

- The main route runs primarily along the Huron River, the most direct trail between the entrance to Oakwoods Metropark at the south end of the park and the entrance to Lower Huron Metropark at the opposite end.
- A secondary bypass route begins slightly north of Willow Road, traversing a combination of wooded areas and meadows for about two miles before intersecting the main trail at Washago Pond.
- Two other shorter segments cross the center portion of the park, one of which connects the western bypass trail with the main trail, with the other starting at the bypass trail and running northward into the pool area.

== Canoeing and Kayaking ==
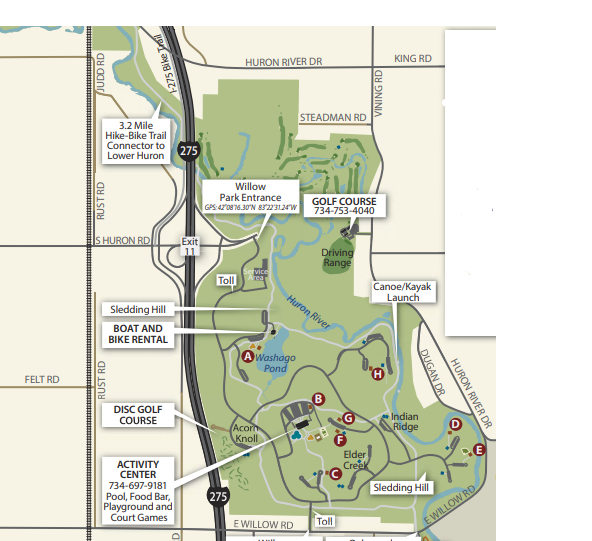
A map of Willow Metropark.

There is one entry point for small crafts on the Huron River, located at the Big Bend picnic area along the main bike route. From here, paddlers can paddle upstream towards Lower Huron Metropark and New Boston or downstream towards Oakwoods Metropark and Flat Rock, though portaging is eventually necessary downstream to get around the Flat Rock Dam.

== Gallery ==
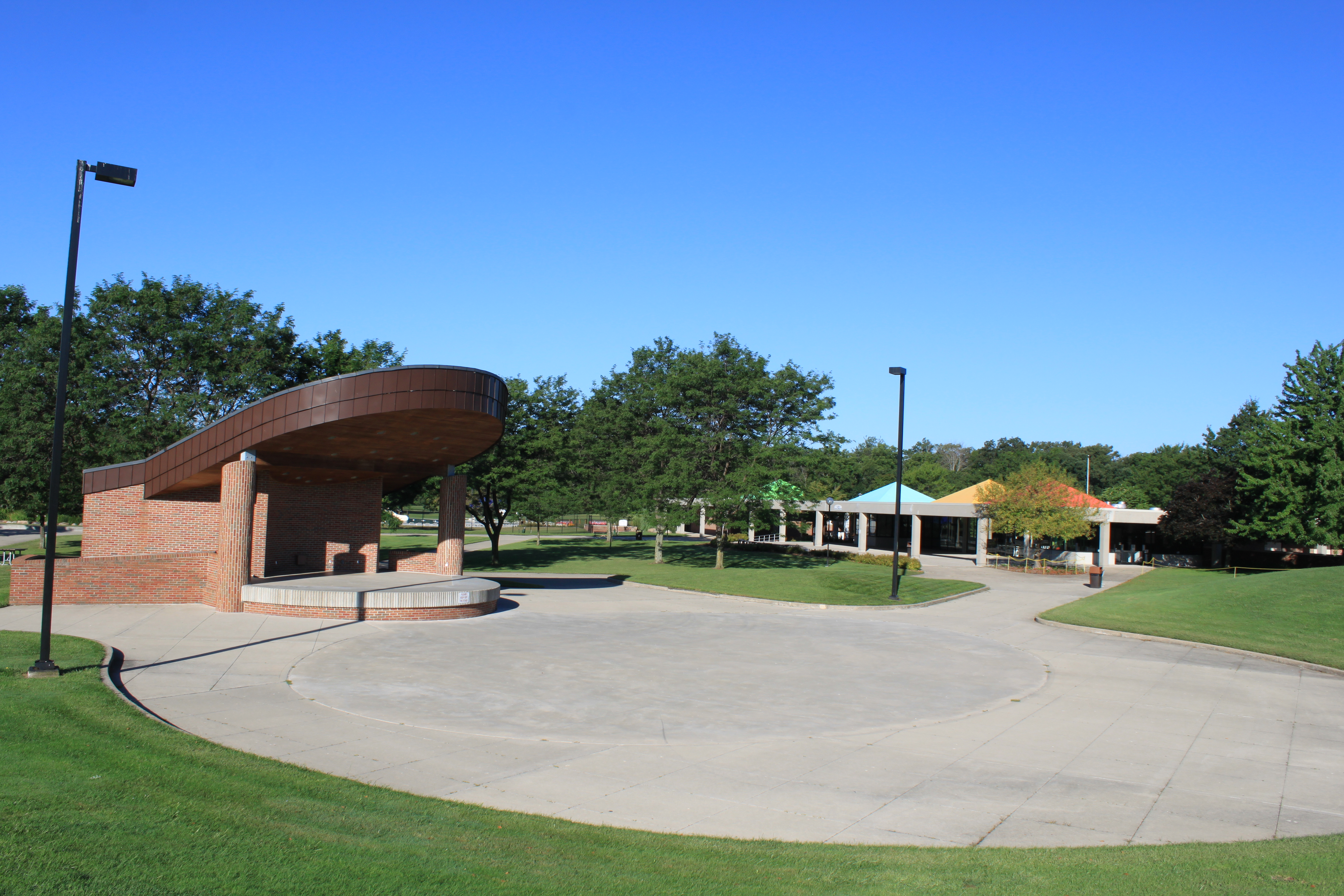
Willow Pool Activity Center

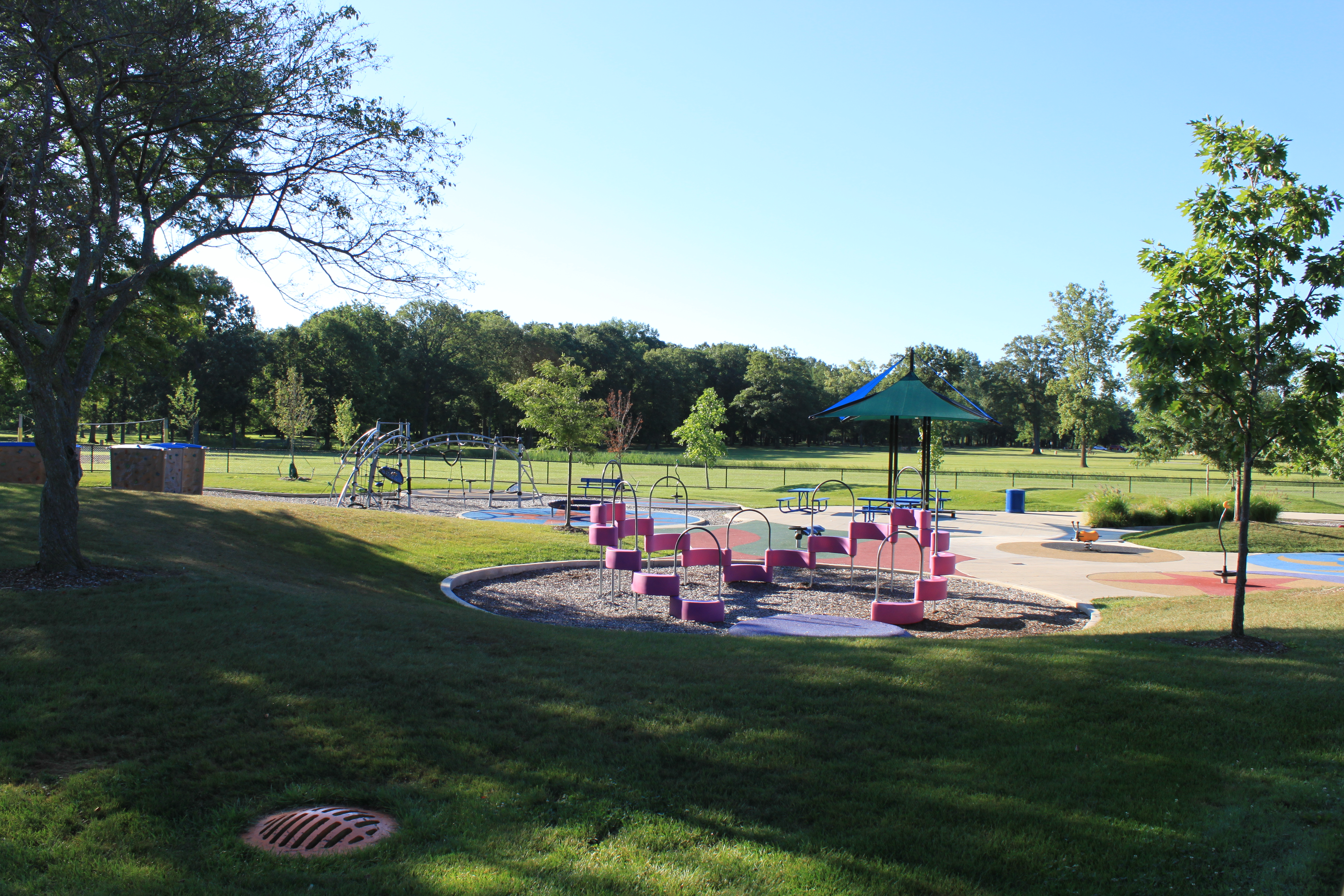
Children's play area

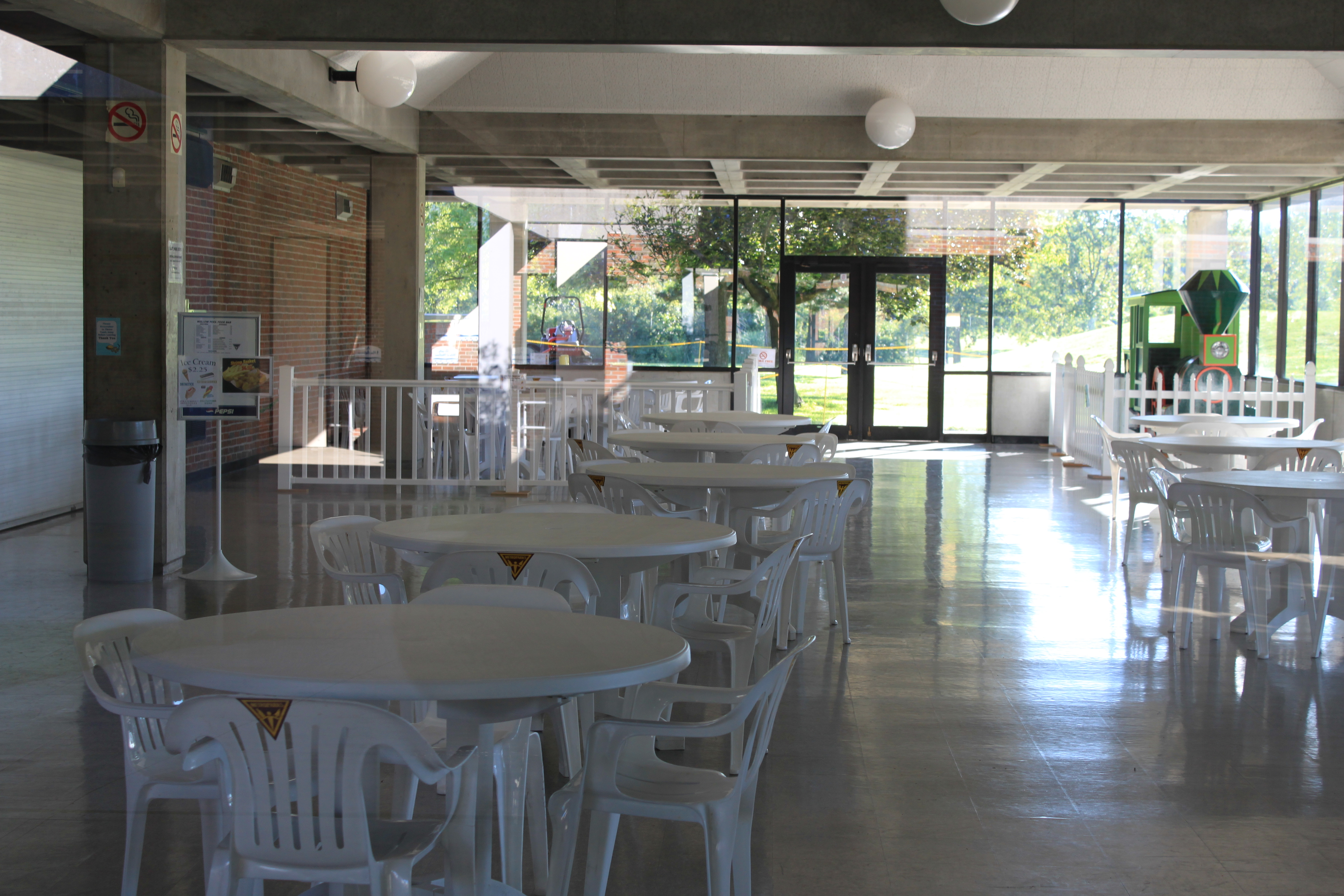
Food bar

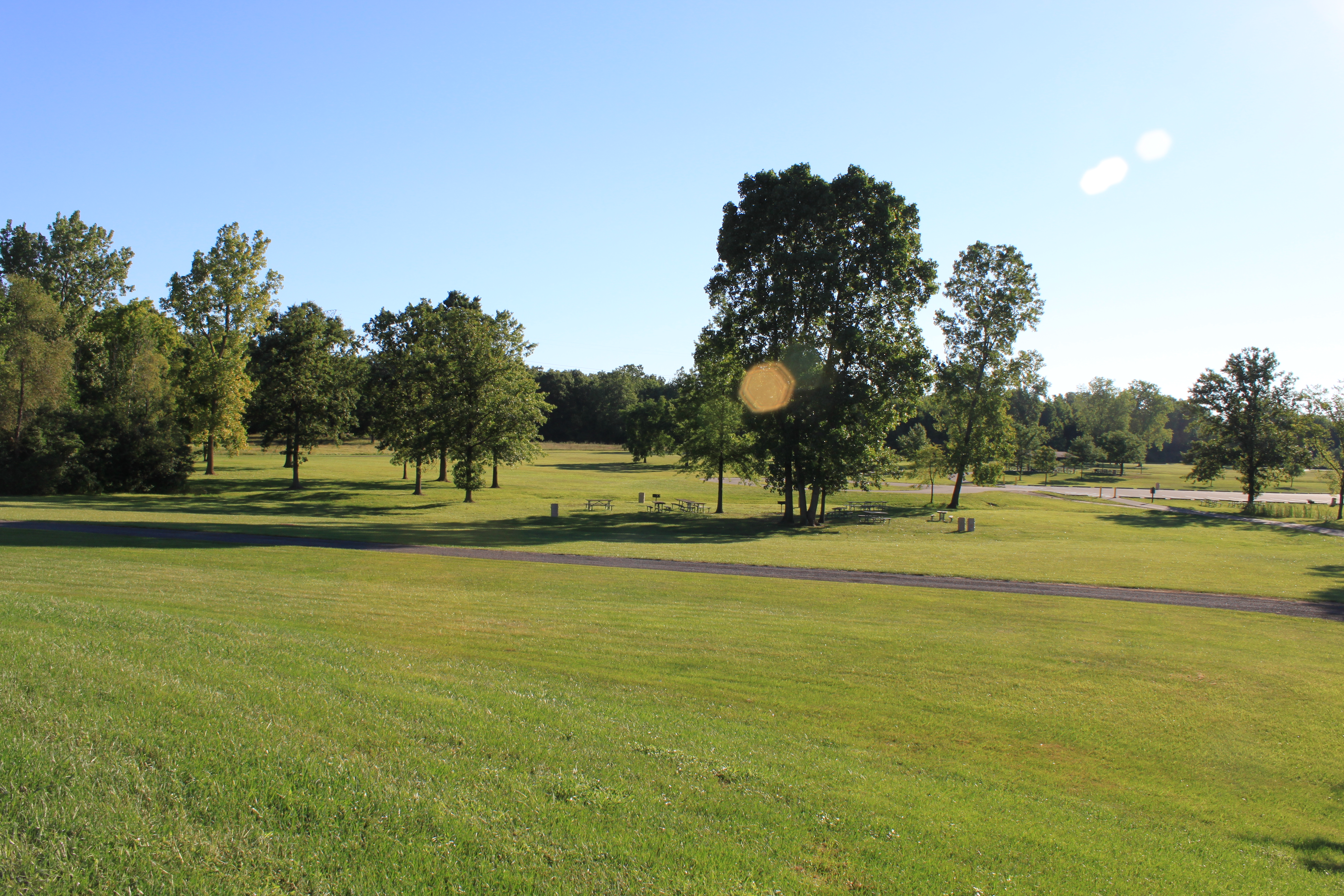
Picnic Area
