= Huron–Clinton Metroparks =

Regional park system around Detroit, Michigan

Coordinates: 42.52214°N 83.68686°W

Huron-Clinton Metroparks System map

The Huron–Clinton Metroparks system is a regional park system in Metro Detroit in the U.S. state of Michigan. The park system includes 13 parks totaling more than 24,000 acres (97 km^{2}) arranged along the Huron River and Clinton River forming a partial ring around the metro area. Plans are in development to finish the ring by building hike/bike trails to connect all the parks as a green belt. The parks draw about 7.5 million visitors a year, down from a peak of 10 million in 2009. The park system is primarily tax-funded with a $50 million annual budget. The system provides employment for 200 full-time and part-time employees year-round and 1,000 additional summer workers. The rivers are prime fishing and canoeing streams with Delhi Metropark including a short rapids, which while runnable, is the only point other than dams on either stream normally portaged.

== Parks ==
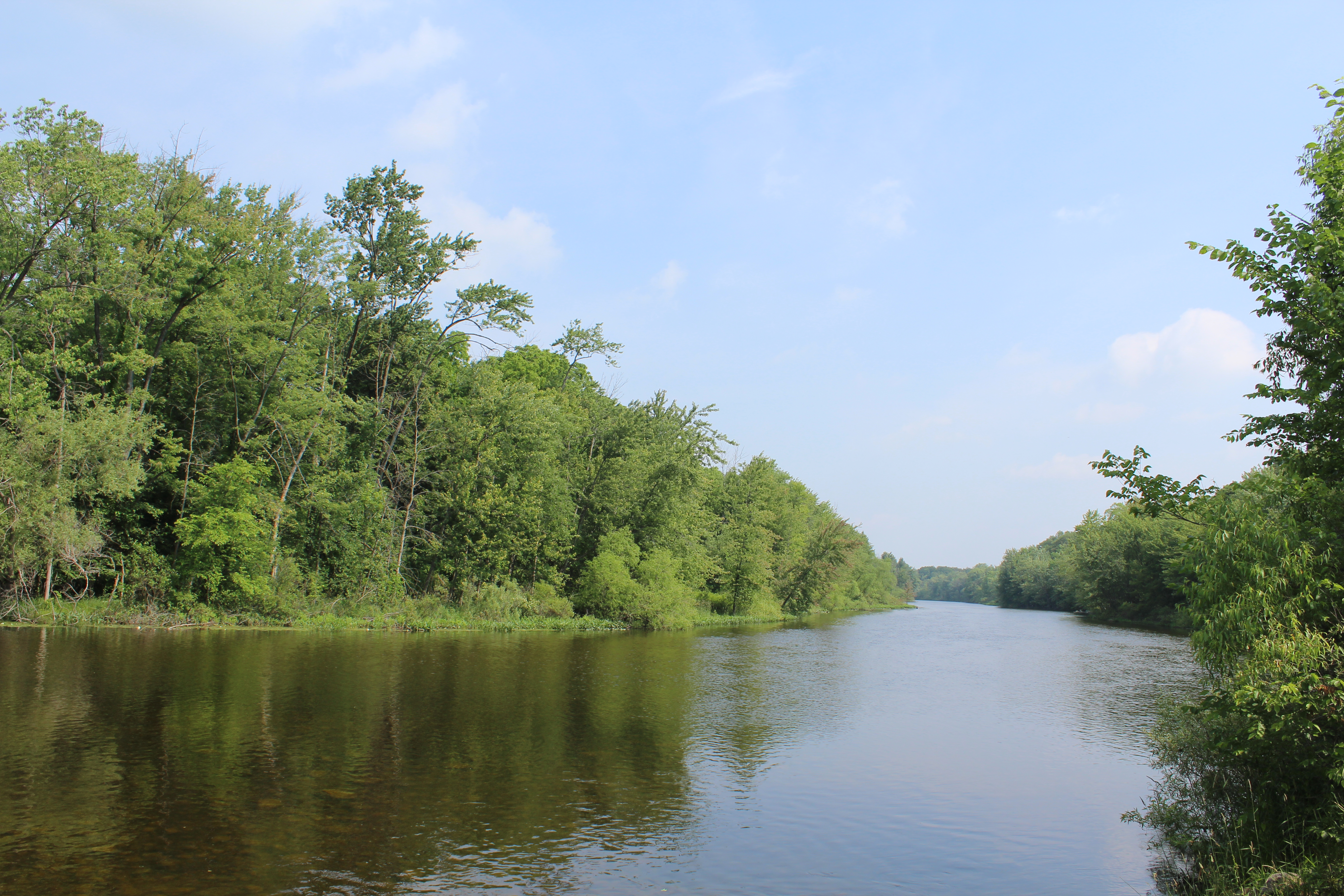
Huron River in Hudson Mills Metropark

The park district encompasses Wayne, Oakland, Macomb, Washtenaw and Livingston counties. The park system was authorized in 1939 and funding began in 1942 with local property taxes providing for most of the budget. Additional funding comes from vehicle admission fees and fees for golf, boat launching, bike and boat rentals, swimming pools and other activities. The Huron-Clinton Metropolitan Authority (HCMA) is the body that administers the Metropark system and is governed by a seven-member Board of Commissioners. Two members are selected by the state governor and the other five members are selected, one from each of the five member counties. The Metropark system exists independent from other park systems in the area which include city, township, county and state parks. The park system has its own police force.

- Delhi Metropark, 81 acres (0.33 km^{2}), opened 1957
- Dexter-Huron Metropark, 122 acres (0.5 km^{2}), opened 1952
- Hudson Mills Metropark, 1,549 acres (6 km^{2}), opened 1957
- Huron Meadows Metropark, 1,576 acres (6 km^{2}), opened 1984
- Indian Springs Metropark, 2,547 acres (10 km^{2}), opened 1982
- Kensington Metropark, 4,543 acres (18 km^{2}), opened 1947
- Lake Erie Metropark, 1,607 acres (7 km^{2}), opened 1980
- Lower Huron Metropark, 1,258 acres (5 km^{2}), opened 1947
- Lake St. Clair Metropark, 770 acres (3.1 km^{2}), opened 1950
- Oakwoods Metropark, 1,756 acres (7 km^{2}), opened 1975
- Stony Creek Metropark, 4,461 acres (18 km^{2}), opened 1964
- Willow Metropark, about 1,700 acres (7 km^{2}), opened 1970
- Wolcott Mill Metropark, 2,625 acres (11 km^{2}), opened 1989

The park system features 84 miles (135 km) of paved hike/bike trails at nine Metroparks for walking, bicycling and in-line skating. Activities in the parks include picnicking, swimming, hiking, golf and disc golf, horseback riding, canoeing and boating, biking, geocaching and fishing. Winter activities include cross-country skiing, sledding and toboggan runs, ice skating and ice fishing. Lake Erie Metropark was previously home to a wave pool, but has been in disuse since 2020 as a result of unaddressed maintenance needs. No plans for reopening have been announced. A couple of the parks have youth group camping or canoe camping areas. Ten parks have historical interpretive centers, farm learning centers or nature centers. Lake St. Clair Metropark has 320 boat slips available for stays of up to 5 days. Kensington has a boat launch and 108 boat slips which are rented on a year-long basis as well as a 49-passenger excursion boat on 1,200-acre (5 km^{2}) Kent Lake, an impoundment of the Huron River. The park system has seven 18-hole golf courses and one par-3 course.

Park system trails also connect to or are part of larger trail systems like the Washtenaw County Border-to-Border Trail and the Michigan Iron Belle Trail.

An overpopulation of white-tailed deer in the parks in recent years was handled by a controversial special archery hunt. In 2019 the system conducted prescribed burns on 115 acres of land.

== See also ==
- Tourism in metropolitan Detroit
