= Lower Huron Metropark =

Public park in Detroit, Michigan

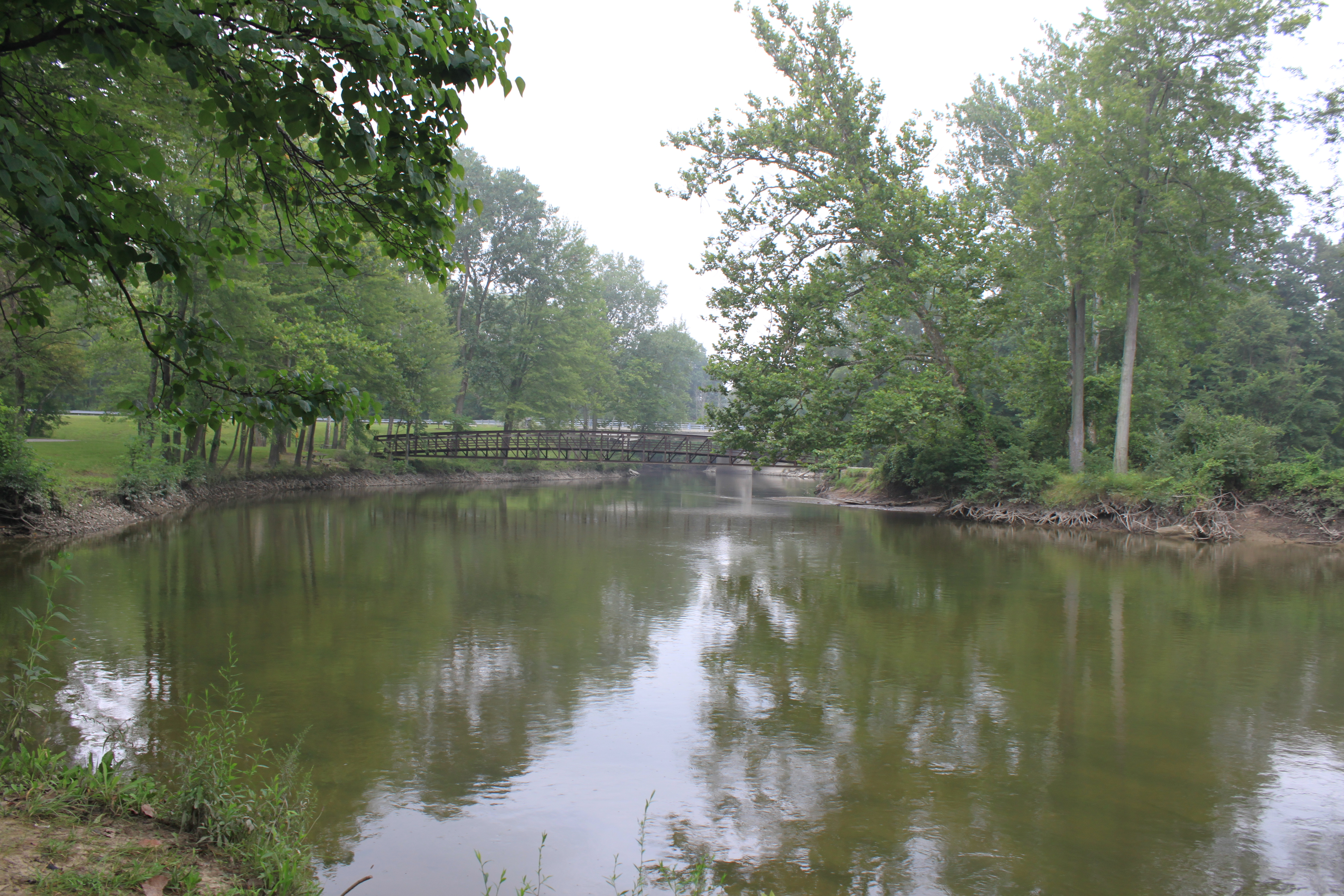
- Bridge over Huron River, Tulip Tree picnic area

- Location within Huron-Clinton Metroparks
- Type: Regional park
- Location: Lower Peninsula, Wayne County, Michigan USA
- Coordinates: 42°10′30.13″N 83°25′39.53″W
- Area: 1,258 acres (509 ha)
- Operator: Huron–Clinton Metroparks
- Status: Open year round
- Website: Official site

Lower Huron Metropark is a park in the Huron-Clinton system of metro parks in Metro Detroit. The park covers 1,258 acres (5.09 km^{2}) along the Huron River and has hike-bike trails and two self-guided nature trails. In the winter, the park has cross-country skiing. The park also has a water slide amusement facility, the Turtle Cove Family Aquatic Center. There is a 27-site campground, a group campground and canoe camping in the park.

Situated in the flood plain of the Huron River, some parts of the park may flood, especially when Belleville Dam releases excess water.

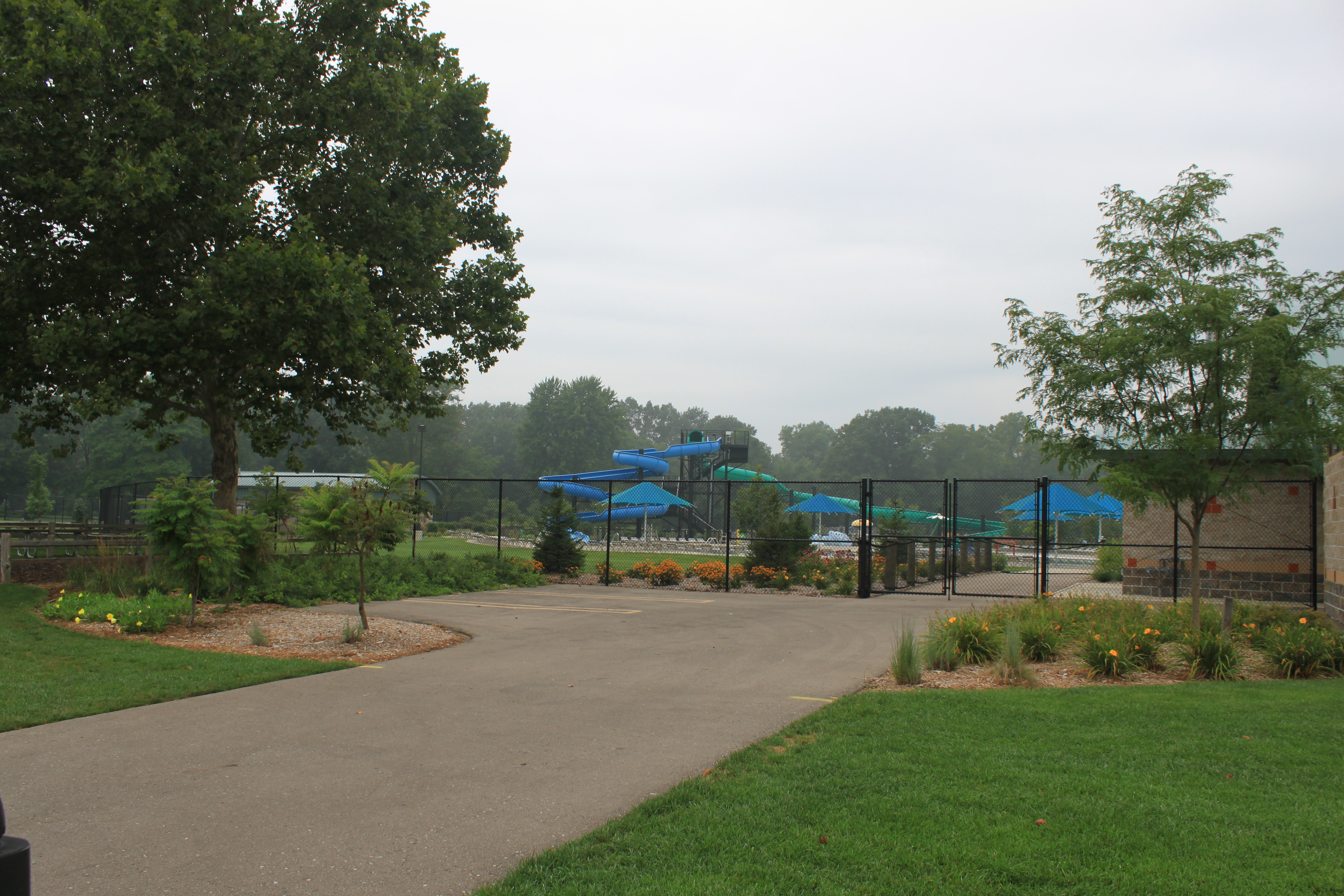
Turtle Cove Aquatic Center
