= Scio Township, Michigan =

- Civil township
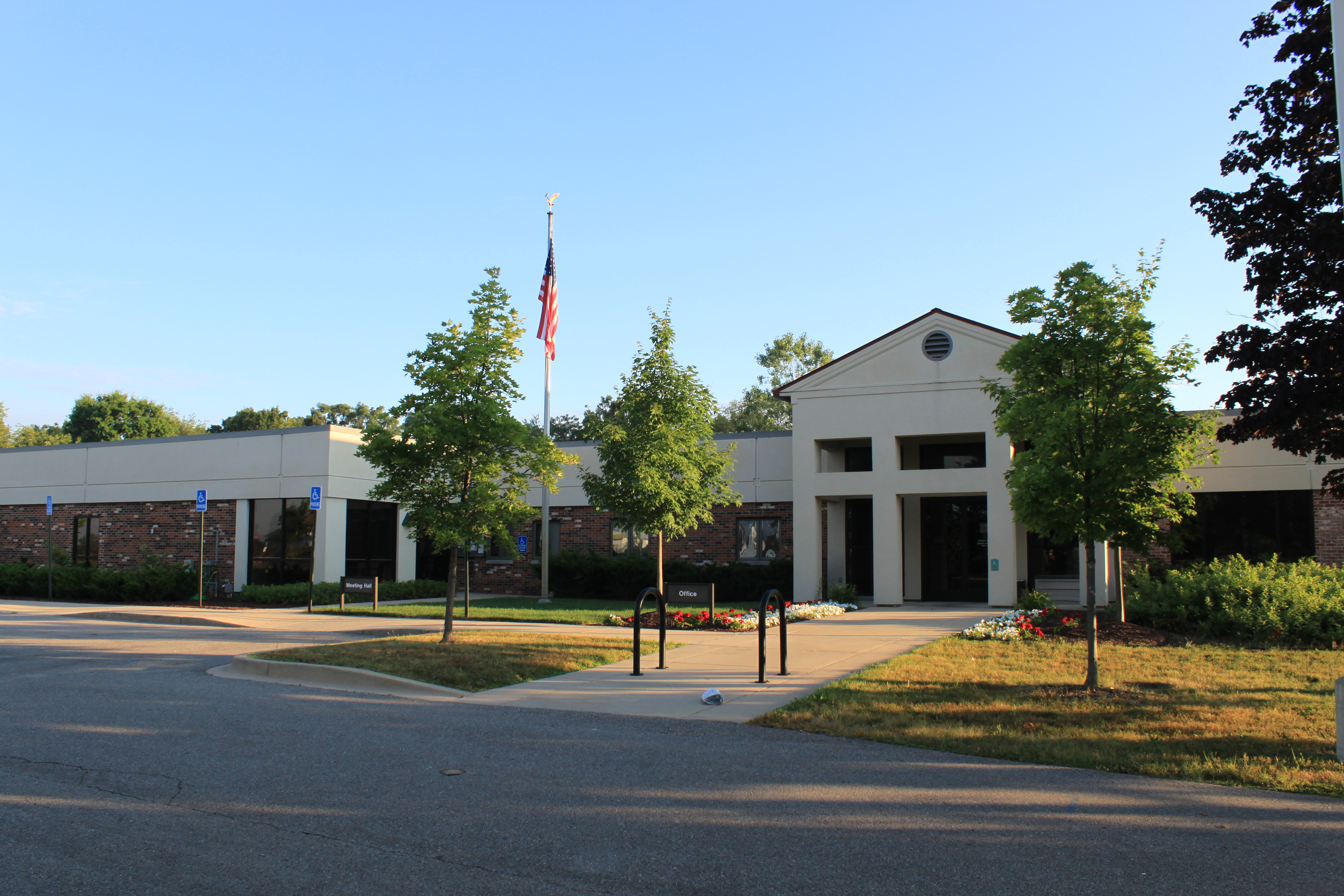
- Township Hall on N. Zeeb Road

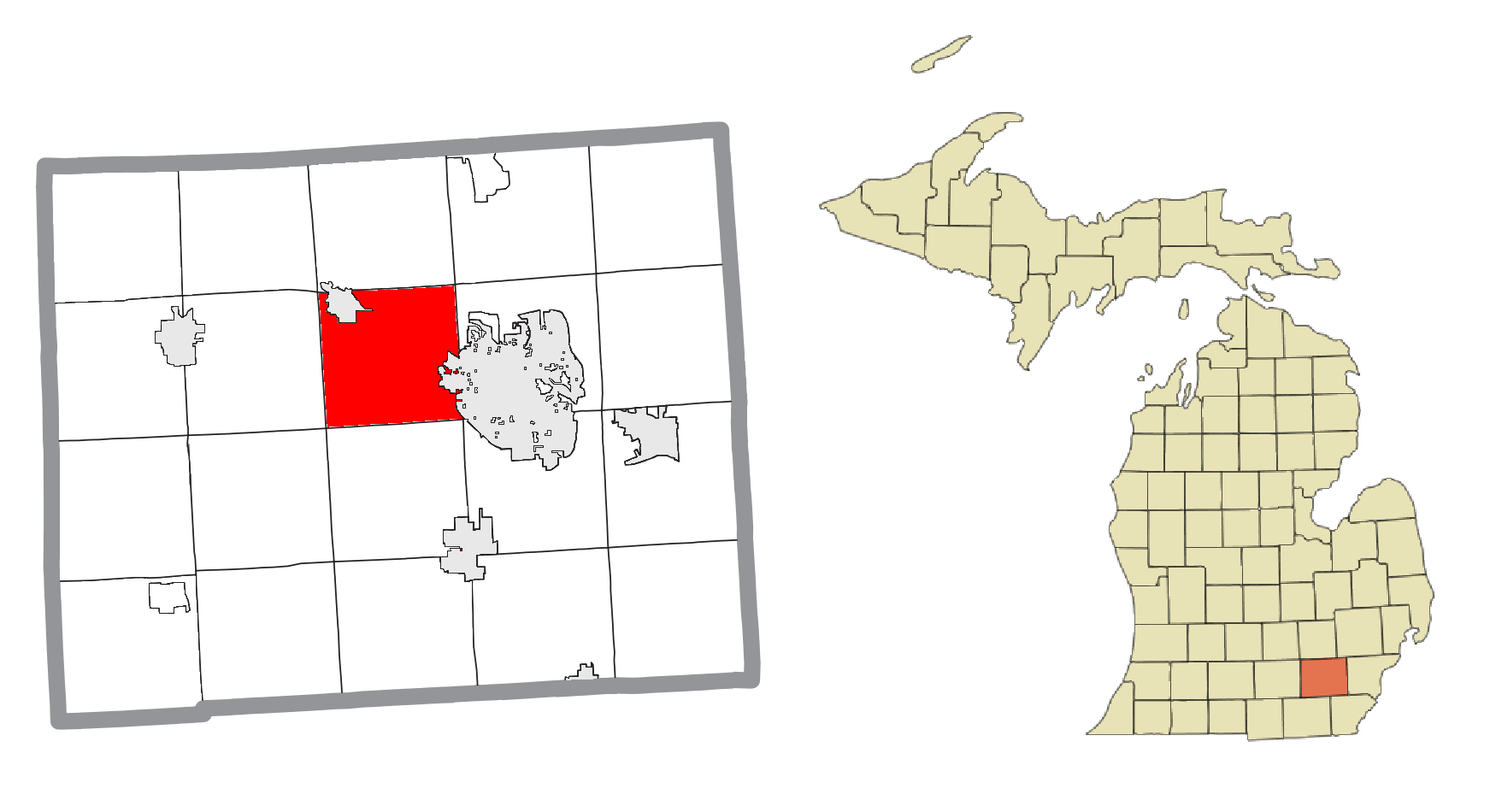
- Location within Washtenaw County

- Location within the state of Michigan Location within the United States
- Coordinates: 42°18′12″N 83°50′10″W
- Country: United States
- State: Michigan
- County: Washtenaw
- Established: 1832

Government
  - Supervisor: Jack Knowles
  - Clerk: Jessica Flintoft

Area
  - Total: 34.21 sq mi (88.60 km^{2})
  - Land: 33.73 sq mi (87.36 km^{2})
  - Water: 0.48 sq mi (1.24 km^{2})
- Elevation: 873 ft (266 m)

Population (2020)
  - Total: 17,552
  - Density: 520.4/sq mi (200.9/km^{2})
- Time zone: UTC-5 (Eastern (EST))
  - Summer (DST): UTC-4 (EDT)
- ZIP code(s): 48103, 48105 (Ann Arbor); 48130 (Dexter)
- Area code: 734
- FIPS code: 26-71940
- GNIS feature ID: 1627050
- Website: Official website

Scio Township is a civil township of Washtenaw County in the U.S. state of Michigan. The population was 17,552 at the 2020 census.

== Communities ==
- Delhi Mills is an unincorporated community located within the township at 42°19′49″N 83°48′40″W. The community was first platted in 1836 by Jacob Doremus under the name Michigan Village. It was soon known as Delhi. In 1842, all unsold plots of land were bought by Norman Goodale, who founded the Delhi Mills company. Scio transferred its post office to Delhi Mills, and the post office operated from February 3, 1871, until September 30, 1903. The area is now part of Delhi Metropark along the Huron River.
- Scio is an unincorporated community located in the northern portion of the township at 42°19′32″N 83°50′22″W. The settlement began with the construction of a mill by Samuel Foster in 1835. Scio, which was named after the township, was platted later that year, and a post office opened on September 9, 1835. The office operated until February 3, 1871, until it closed and transferred to Delhi Mills. Another post office was reestablished in Scio on September 26, 1871.
- Weinsburg is a former settlement founded by German Lutheran farmers within the township in 1890. Weinsburg had its own post office from January 30, 1890, until May 15, 1901.

== History ==
Samuel W. Foster bought a mill site on the Huron River at what is now Scio in 1835. The community was platted by Dr. Cyril Nichols from Vermont. A post office was established in 1835. The office was moved to Delhi Mills and renamed in February 1871, though the Scio office was re-established in September 1871. The post office took its name from the township; however, early township records were destroyed by fire, and it is uncertain why "Scio" was chosen. There are at least three origins suggested for the name. The first suggests it derives from the Greek island of Chios, and the second that it was named after Scio, New York, although that town was also named for Chios. Thirdly, by coincidence scio also means "I know" in Latin, so following the American Civil War some people assumed this was the origin of the name.

Documents regarding the naming of townships in the State of Michigan archives indicate that Scio Township and its northern neighbor Webster Township were named on the same date, unlike other townships in Washtenaw County. This date followed the establishment by the United States of America of diplomatic relations with the modern nation of Greece, following the Greek War of Independence (1821–1830). U.S. Senator Daniel Webster had introduced a resolution, recorded in the Congressional Record, that is widely considered one of his better orations (printed in the Collected Works of Daniel Webster). He advocated that the USA be the first nation to diplomatically recognize Greece. Webster referred to the 1822 destruction of Scio, the then-current French translation of Chios (Greek: Χίος, pronounced /ˈçio̞s/), derived from the Genoese dialect. In Webster's era, French was the language of international diplomacy. Eugène Delacroix's 1824 painting The Massacre at Chios and numerous publications brought the Greek cause to the attention of Americans. Ypsilanti Township was named after the first leader of the secret organization that coordinated the beginning of the revolution, Alexander Ypsilanti (Greek: Αλέξανδρος Υψηλάντης). The City of Ypsilanti was named after the victor of the final battle of the revolution, Alexander's brother Demetrius. The sister townships of Scio and Webster were named as a monument to the birth of the new Greek republic, the end of its citizen's subjection, and the first American senator to support their nation.

Delhi Mills was platted as "Michigan Village" by Jacob Doremus in 1836, but was renamed Delhi. In 1842, Norman C. Goodale, known as the founder of Delhi Mills, acquired all the unsold lots. The Scio post office was transferred here in 1871 and operated until 1903.

== Geography ==
According to the U.S. Census Bureau at the 2010 census, the township has a total area of 34.21 square miles (88.60 km^{2}), of which 33.73 square miles (87.36 km^{2}) is land and 0.48 square miles (1.24 km^{2}) (1.40%) is water. A portion of Scio Township's area and population decreased slightly after the census when the village of Dexter incorporated as an autonomous city in 2014.

Scio Township contains two metro parks along the Huron River: Dexter–Huron Metropark and Delhi Metropark. The Border-to-Border Trail runs through the township.

=== Major highways ===
- I-94 runs east–west through the center of the township.
- M-14 enters briefly into the township and has its western terminus soon after at Interstate 94.

== Demographics ==
As of the census of 2000, there were 15,759 people, 6,070 households, and 4,425 families residing in the township. The population density was 463.0 inhabitants per square mile (178.8/km^{2}). There were 6,338 housing units at an average density of 186.2 per square mile (71.9/km^{2}). The racial makeup of the township was 89.53% White, 4.13% African American, 0.27% Native American, 3.70% Asian, 0.03% Pacific Islander, 0.40% from other races, and 1.94% from two or more races. Hispanic or Latino of any race were 1.53% of the population.

There were 6,070 households, out of which 37.4% had children under the age of 18 living with them, 60.8% were married couples living together, 9.1% had a female householder with no husband present, and 27.1% were non-families. 20.7% of all households were made up of individuals, and 5.0% had someone living alone who was 65 years of age or older. The average household size was 2.59 and the average family size was 3.03.

In the township the population was spread out, with 27.2% under the age of 18, 6.9% from 18 to 24, 30.7% from 25 to 44, 26.9% from 45 to 64, and 8.4% who were 65 years of age or older. The median age was 37 years. For every 100 females, there were 95.4 males. For every 100 females age 18 and over, there were 92.4 males.

The median income for a household in the township was $73,705, and the median income for a family was $87,498. Males had a median income of $60,313 versus $38,000 for females. The per capita income for the township was $36,837. About 1.8% of families and 2.9% of the population were below the poverty line, including 1.5% of those under age 18 and 4.6% of those age 65 or over.

== Education ==
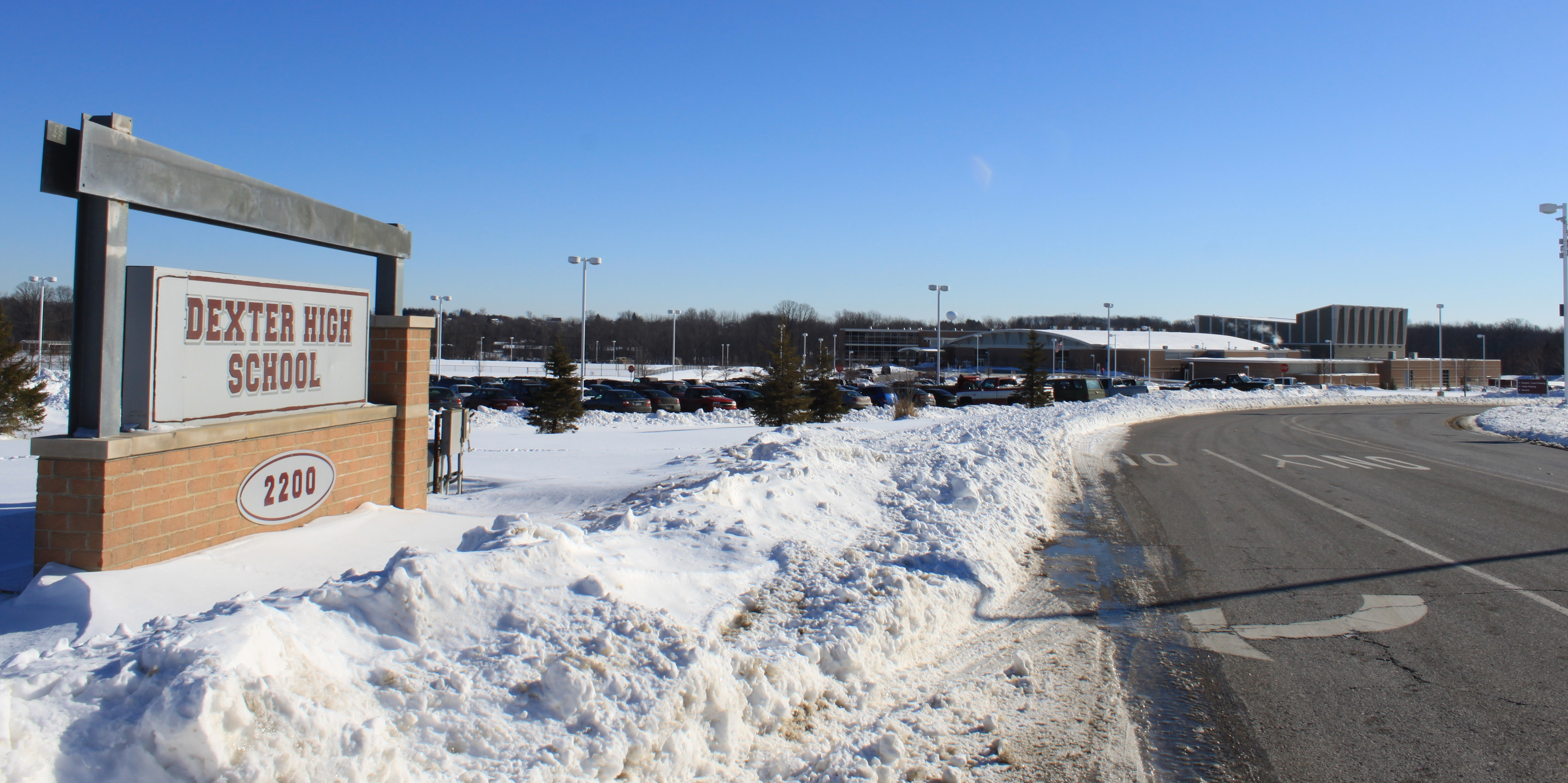
Dexter High School

Scio Township is served by two public school districts. The eastern section of the township is served by Ann Arbor Public Schools, while the western section of the township is served by Dexter Community School District.

Dexter High School is in the township.

== Images ==
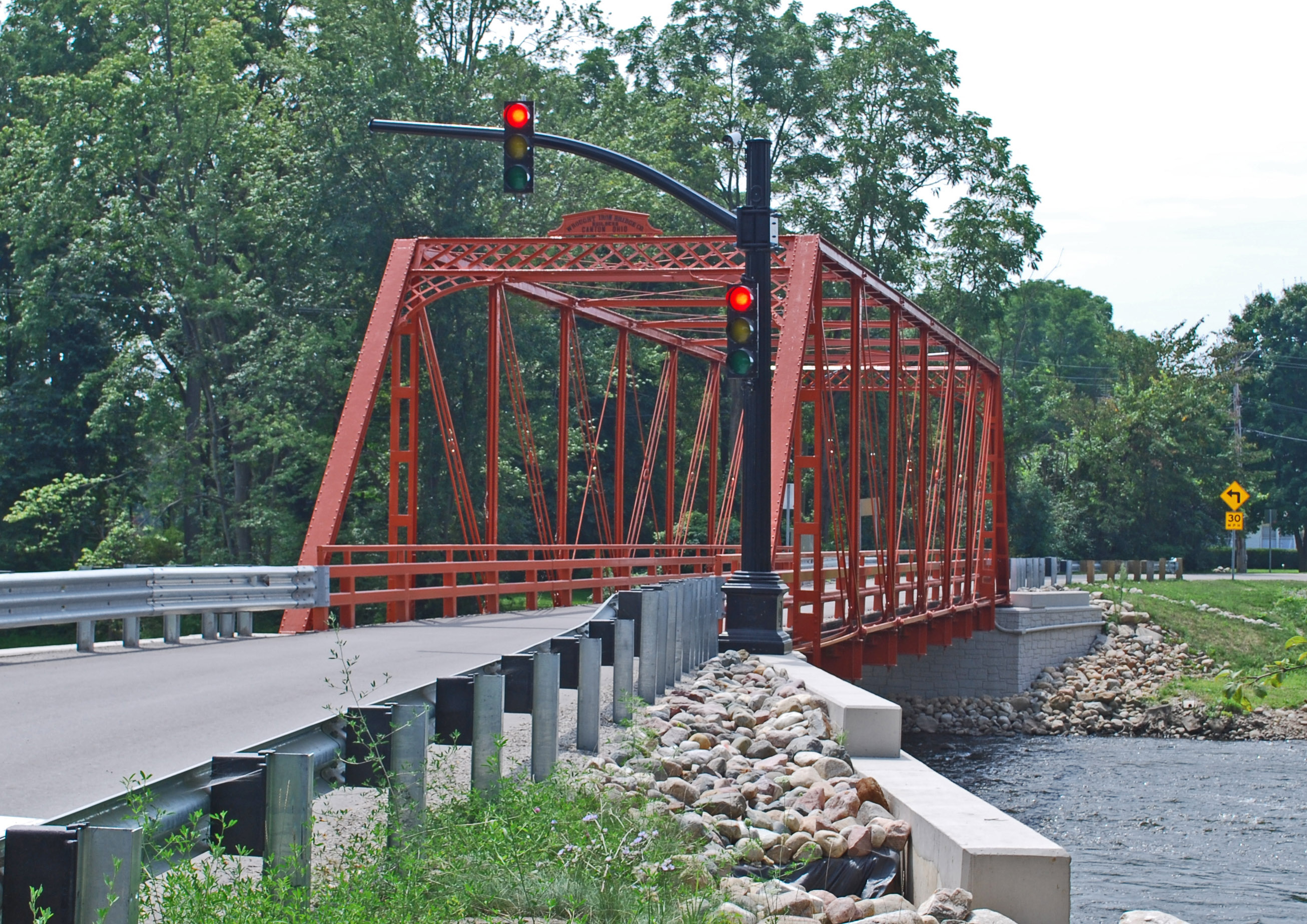
Delhi Bridge within Delhi Metropark

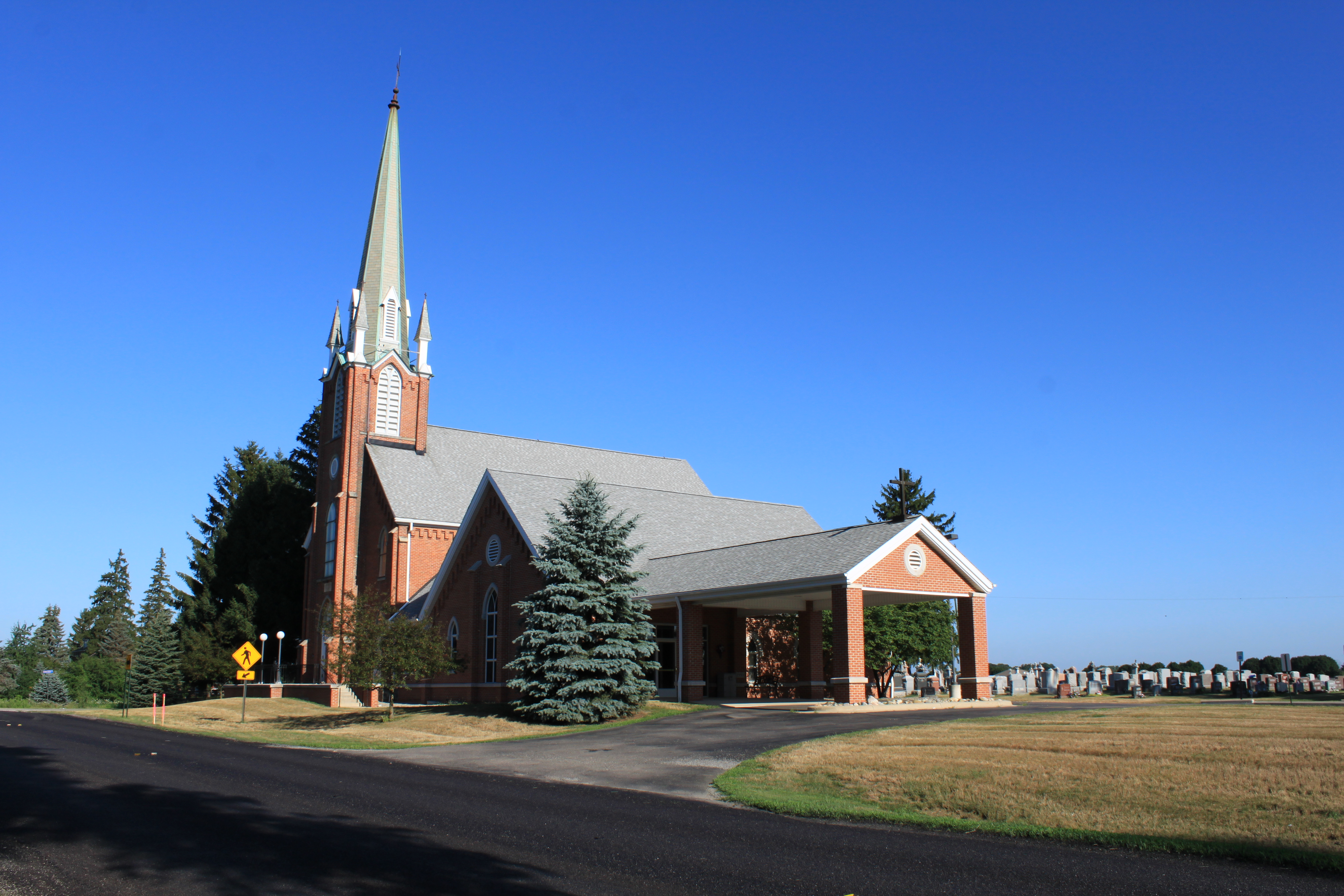
Salem Evangelical Lutheran Church

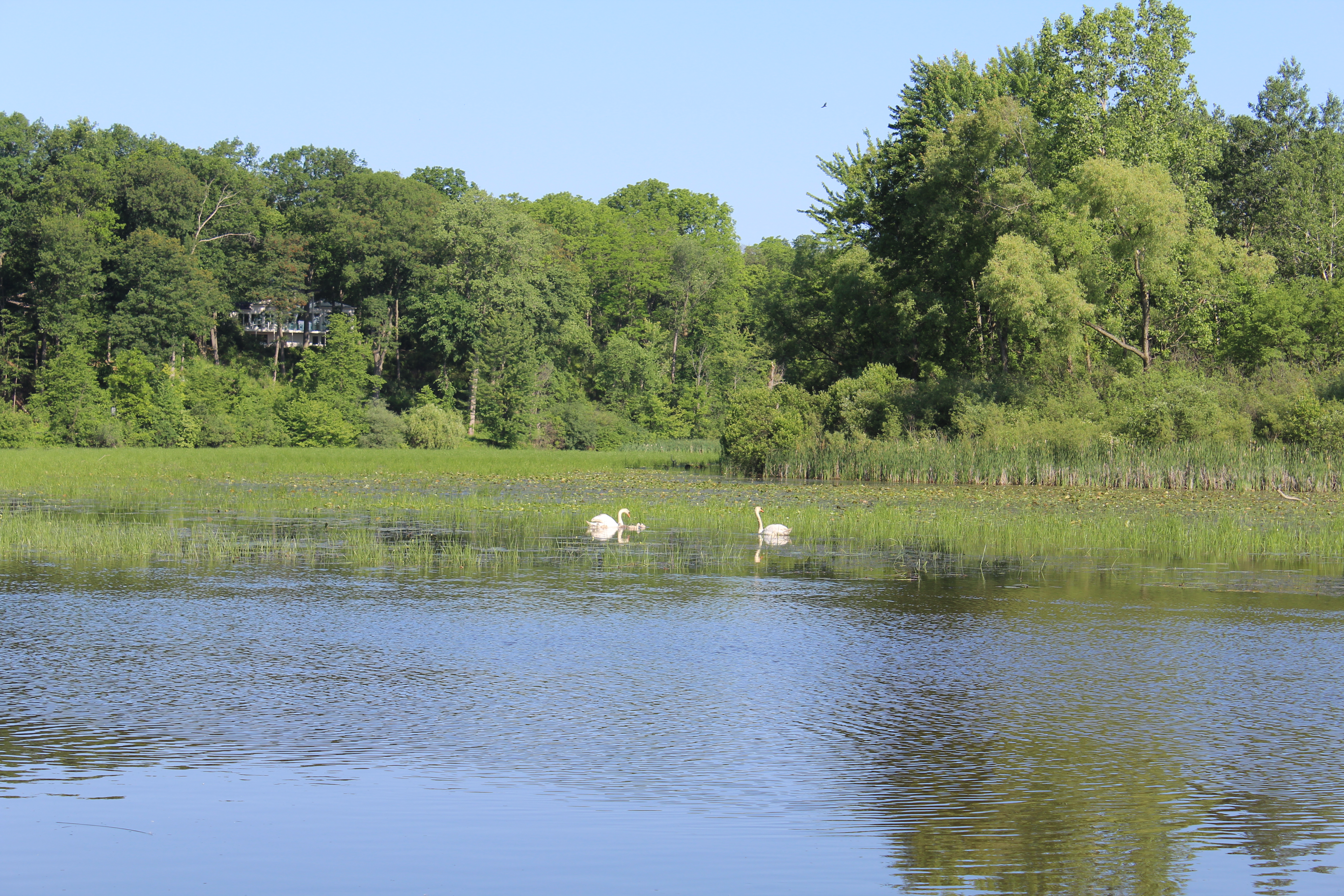
Huron River flowing through the township
