= CDOS =

CDOS may refer to:

- Cromemco DOS (CDOS), an CP/M-like operating system
- Concurrent DOS (CDOS), a Digital Research operating system based on Concurrent CP/M-86 since 1984
- Collateralized debt obligation (CDOs), a type of structured asset-backed security

== See also ==
- COS (disambiguation)
- DOS (disambiguation)
