= GDB (disambiguation) =

GDB or gdb may refer to:

- GDB is the abbreviation used by the Girondins de Bordeaux
- GDB Human Genome Database
- GNU Debugger, a free and open-source debugger developed by the GNU Project
- Guide Dogs for the Blind, US
- .gdb, a filename extension used by ArcGIS Geodatabase
- Puerto Rico Government Development Bank
- Graph database, using graph structures
- GDB, chassis code for the second generation Subaru Impreza WRX
- Greg Brockman (born 1987), American entrepreneur also known as gdb
