= ProQuest =

American distributor of ebooks and digital media

ProQuest LLC

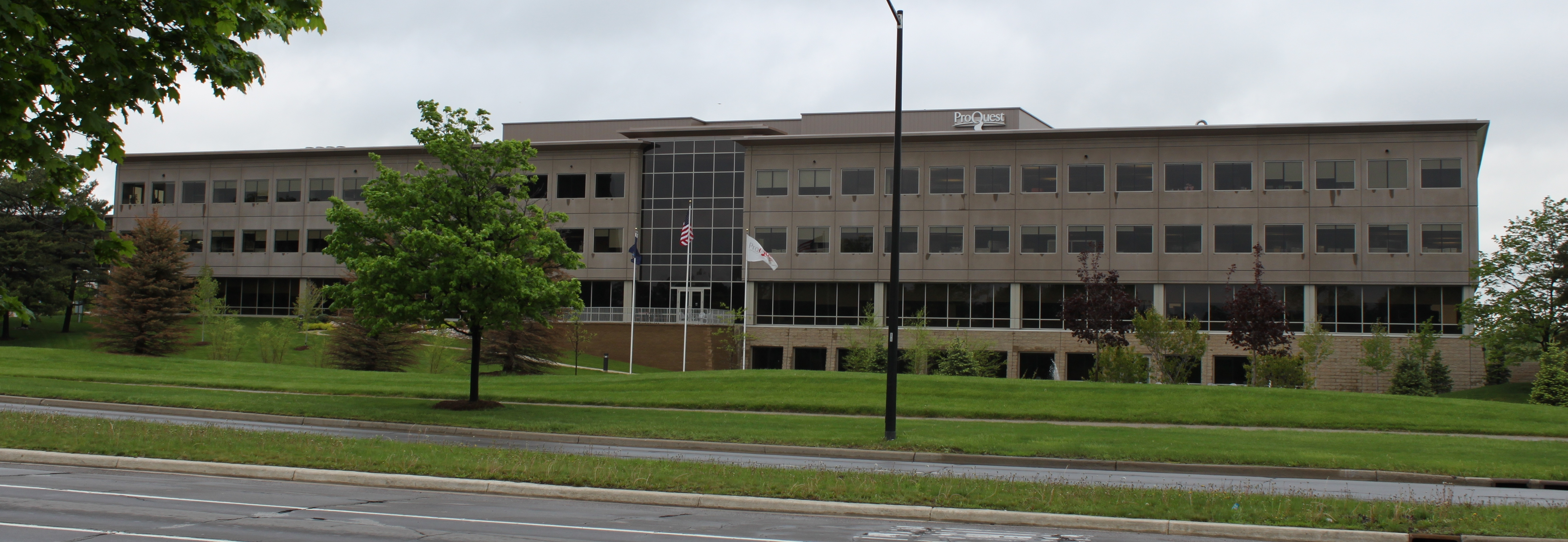
- Headquarters at Ann Arbor, Michigan
- Type: Subsidiary
- Industry: Information and data provider
- Founded: 1938; 88 years ago as University Microfilms
- Founder: Eugene Power
- Headquarters: Ann Arbor, Michigan, US
- Key people: Andy Snyder (chairman); Matti Shem-Tov (CEO); Robert VanHees (CFO)
- Parent: Cambridge Information Group (2006–2021); Clarivate (2021–present)
- Website: www.proquest.com

ProQuest LLC is an American global information-content and technology company, founded in 1938 as University Microfilms by Eugene Power. It is based in Ann Arbor, Michigan.

ProQuest is known for its applications and information services for libraries, providing access to dissertations, theses, ebooks, newspapers, periodicals, historical collections, governmental archives, cultural archives, and other aggregated databases. This content was estimated to be around 125 billion digital pages.

The company began operations as a producer of microfilm products, subsequently shifting to electronic publishing, and later grew through acquisitions. On December 1, 2021, Clarivate bought ProQuest from Cambridge Information Group for $5.3 billion in what was described as a "huge deal in the library and information publishing world". Clarivate said that the operational concept behind the acquisition was integrating ProQuest's products and applications with Web of Science.

== Businesses ==
ProQuest was founded as a microfilm publisher. It began publishing doctoral dissertations in 1939, has published more than 3 million searchable dissertations and theses, and is designated as an offsite digital archive for the United States Library of Congress. The company's scholarly content includes dissertations and theses, primary source material, ebooks, scholarly journals, historical and current newspapers and periodicals, data sources, and other content of interest to researchers. ProQuest Video Preservation and Discovery Service allows libraries to preserve and provide access to their proprietary audio and video collections.

In May 2014, ProQuest LLC also operated businesses under the following names:

- Bowker provides bibliographic information management solutions to publishers, libraries and booksellers, and is the ISBN Agency for the United States.
- Dialog is an online information service with more than 1.4 billion unique records curated for corporate, business and government researchers, with a focus on pharmaceutical, engineering and patent research.
- EBL (Ebook Library), an ebook aggregator with a catalog of titles from academic publishers, serves academic, corporate and research libraries while supporting emerging collection development models such as patron-driven acquisition.
- ebrary was an online digital library that offered access to ebook collections, by subscription or a perpetual archive model, in subject packages tailored for academic, corporate, government, public and high school libraries.

== History ==
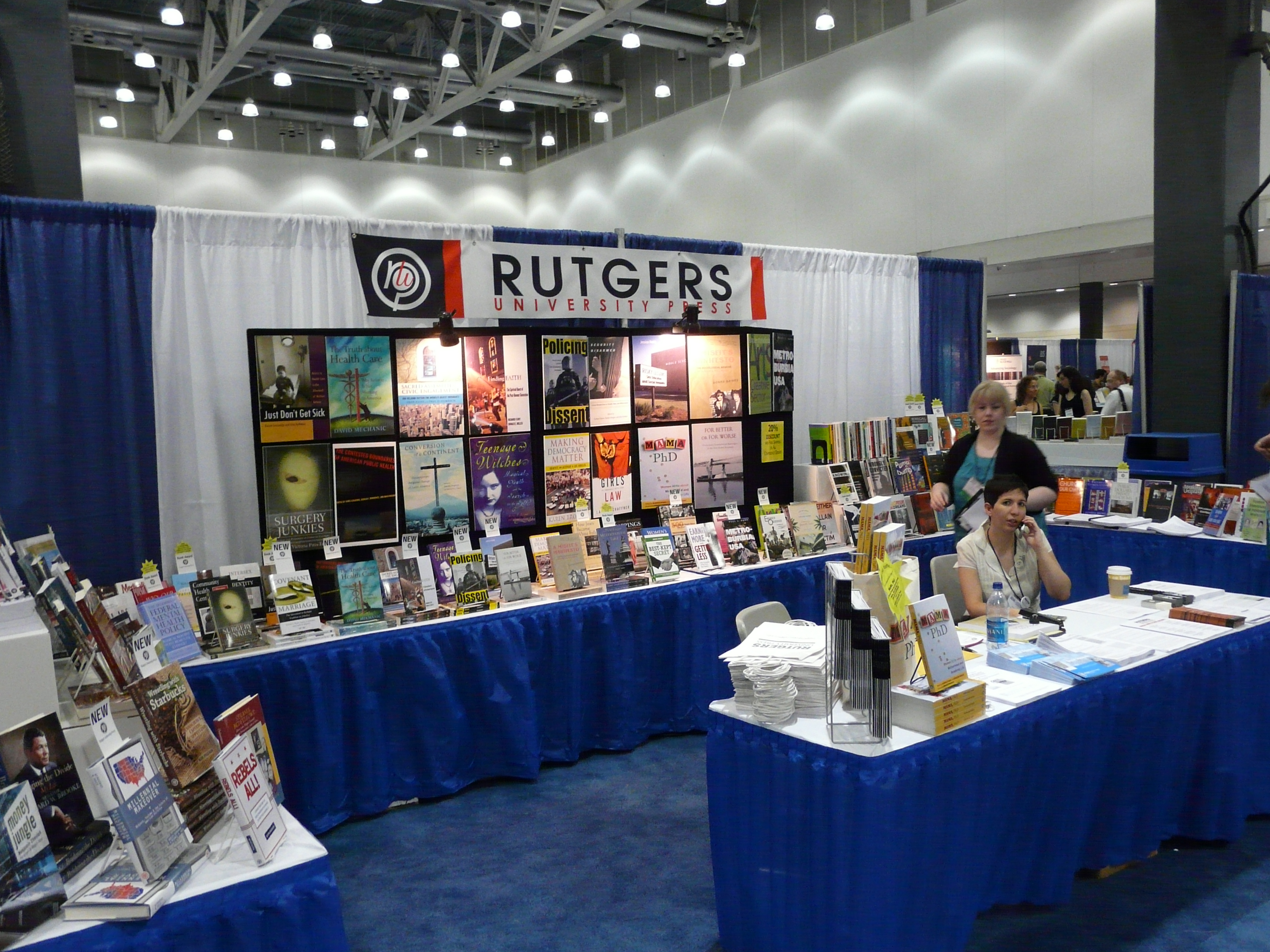
2008 conference booth

=== 1930s–1950s ===
Eugene Power, a 1927 BA and 1930 MBA graduate of the University of Michigan, founded the company as University Microfilms in 1938, preserving works from the British Museum on microfilm. By June 1938, Power worked in two rented rooms from a downtown Ann Arbor funeral parlor, specializing in microphotography to preserve library collections. In his autobiography Edition of One, Power details the development of the company, including how University Microfilms assisted the Office of Strategic Services (OSS) intelligence agency during World War II. This work mainly involved filming maps and European newspapers so they could be shipped back and forth overseas more cheaply and discreetly.

Power also noticed a niche market in dissertations publishing. Students were often forced to publish their own works in order to finish their doctoral degree. Dissertations could be published more cheaply as microfilm than as books. ProQuest still publishes so many dissertations that its Dissertations and Theses collection (formerly called Digital Dissertations) has been declared the official U.S. off-site repository of the Library of Congress.

The idea of universal adoption of microfilm publication of doctoral dissertations was furthered considerably by two articles researched and written by a then recent recipient of the doctorate in history at Stanford University. Vaughn Davis Bornet seized on the idea and published "Doctoral Dissertations and the Stream of Scholarship" and "Microfilm Publication of Doctoral Dissertations".

As the dissertations market grew, the company expanded into filming newspapers and periodicals. The company's main newspaper database is ProQuest Newsstand.

=== 1960s–1990s ===
In 1962, Xerox acquired the company for 51,750 shares of Xerox common stock, worth about $7.9 million. Under Xerox's ownership, the name of the company changed several times, from University Microfilms to Xerox University Microfilms, to University Microfilms International, then shortened to UMI. In 1985, it was purchased from Xerox by Bell & Howell. In 1986, UMI acquired Data Courier, owner of ABI/INFORM, from the Bingham family.

In the 1980s, UMI began producing CD-ROMs that stored databases of periodicals abstracts and indexes. At a time when modem connections were slow and expensive, it was more efficient to mail database CD-ROMs regularly to subscribing libraries, who installed the discs on dedicated PCs. The ProQuest brand name was first used for databases on CD-ROM. An online service called ProQuest Direct was launched in 1995; its name was later shortened to just ProQuest. The bibliographic databases are mainly sold to schools, universities and libraries.

In 1998, the company announced the "Digital Vault Initiative", purported to include 5.5 billion images digitized from UMI microfilm, including some of the best existing copies of major newspapers dating back 100 to 150 years, and Early English books dating back to the 15th century. While work continues to digitize the contents of the microfilm vault, ProQuest is already providing navigation of 125 billion digital pages, including nearly 20 million pages of newspaper content dating from pre-Revolutionary War America.

In 1999, the company name changed to Bell & Howell Information and Learning, and then in 2001 to ProQuest Information and Learning; Bell & Howell renamed itself the ProQuest Company.

Also in 1999, the company acquired Chadwyck-Healey, a one-time microfilm publishing company that was one of the first to produce full-text CD-ROM databases. This acquisition gave Proquest ownership of a 100+ person publishing operation based in Cambridge, England, and became the basis for a substantial overseas expansion.

=== 2000s ===
During the 2000–2004 fiscal years, as well as the first three quarters of the 2005 fiscal year, ProQuest systematically overstated its net income. Cumulatively, pre-tax profits were overstated by 129.9 million dollars (or about 31 percent). In 2008, Voyager Learning Company and ProQuest's CFO (from the time of the earnings overstatements) settled SEC "charges without admitting or denying the allegations of the SEC's complaint".

In 2001 ProQuest acquired Norman Ross Publishing, a small New York based microfilm publisher.

In 2002 ProQuest acquired bigchalk.com, a company founded in 1999 with the combined assets of ProQuest's K-12 division and Infonautics Inc.'s K-12 business.

In 2004, ProQuest Information and Learning acquired Seattle start-up Serials Solutions, a venture providing access management and search services for content hosted by other companies.

Also in 2004, the company acquired Copley Publishing Group.

In 2005, three ProQuest executives formed a distribution company called National Archive Publishing Co, of XanEdu, UMI, and Digital Service Operations. The building that would house this new company stood at 300 Zeeb Road in Scio, Michigan, home to nearly 6 billion pages of information.

In 2006, ProQuest Company, then the parent company of ProQuest Information and Learning, sold it to Cambridge Information Group, owner of R. R. Bowker. From the time of this sale, this article follows the history of ProQuest Information and Learning, not ProQuest Company. (ProQuest Company subsequently renamed itself to Voyager Learning Company, and later became part of Cambium Learning Group.)

In 2007, ProQuest Information and Learning was merged with CSA to form ProQuest CSA. Later that year it was renamed ProQuest LLC.

In 2008, ProQuest LLC acquired complete ownership of RefWorks, a web-based citation manager of which it had been part owner since 2001. RefWorks was merged with ProQuest's existing Community of Science (COS) business to form RefWorks/COS.

Also in 2008, ProQuest acquired Dialog, a major online database firm, from Thomson Reuters.

=== 2010s–2020s ===
In 2010, ProQuest acquired two properties from LexisNexis, the Congressional Information Service (CIS) and University Publications of America (UPA). CIS produced one of the world's most exhaustive online collections of legislative content and highly respected statistical works, while UPA included deep historical content sets. The acquisition included digital products and an expansive microfilm vault that would leverage ProQuest's strength in conversion from film to searchable electronic formats.

In 2011, ProQuest acquired ebrary, an online digital library of full texts of over 170,000 scholarly e-books. In 2013, ProQuest acquired Ebook Library (EBL), with plans to combine ebrary and EBL into a single e-book platform.

In 2014, ProQuest acquired Pi2 Solutions, a privately owned company specializing in Drug Safety Triager (DST) & Product Literature Database (PLD) systems for the biopharmaceutical industry. The company aligned Pi2 Solutions with its ProQuest Dialog corporate information service.

In 2015, ProQuest acquired SiPX and Coutts Information Services, including the MyiLibrary platform and the Online Acquisitions and Selection Information System (OASIS).

In October 2015, ProQuest acquired Ex Libris. It was to merge the Workflow Solutions division of ProQuest, which included the former Serials Solutions, into Ex Libris, with the enlarged entity to be named "Ex Libris, a ProQuest Company".

In June 2016, ProQuest acquired Alexander Street Press, a provider of streaming videos and ebooks.

In January 2020, ProQuest acquired Innovative Interfaces, Inc., a provider of technology solutions to academic and public libraries.

On 17 May 2021, it was announced that Clarivate would acquire ProQuest. On July 28, 2021, Clarivate announced that the acquisition was delayed due to a Federal Trade Commission antitrust probe. On December 1, 2021, Clarivate successfully completed the acquisition of ProQuest.

== See also ==
- Annual Bibliography of English Language and Literature
- Dissertations Abstracts
- List of academic databases and search engines
- Ulrich's Periodicals Directory
