= Cos =

Cos, COS, CoS, coS or Cos. may refer to:

== Mathematics, science and technology ==
- Carbonyl sulfide
- Class of service (CoS or COS), a network header field defined by the IEEE 802.1p task group
- Class of service (COS), a parameter in telephone systems
- Cobalt sulfide
- COS cells, cell lines COS-1 and COS-7
- Cosine, a trigonometric function
- Cosmic Origins Spectrograph, a Hubble Space Telescope instrument

== Operating systems ==
- COS (operating system), a Chinese mobile OS
- Cray Operating System
- Chippewa Operating System, from Control Data Corporation
- Commercial Operating System, from Digital Equipment Corporation
- GEC COS

== Places ==
- Cos, Ariège, France
- Cos or Kos, a Greek island
- COS, IATA code for Colorado Springs Airport, Colorado, US
  - Colorado Springs, Colorado, a US city, derived from its airport's code
- Gulf of Cos, Aegean Sea
- Villa de Cos, Zacatecas, Mexico
- Cosio Valtellino (Cös), Lombardy, Italy
- COS, UNDP country code of Costa Rica

== Organizations, societies and churches ==
- Charity Organization Society
- Children's Orchestra Society, New York City, US
- Church of Satan, a religious organization
- Church of Scientology
- Church of Scotland
- Church of Sweden
- Commandement des Opérations Spéciales, coordinating French special forces
- Community of Science, an online database
- Company of Servers, Anglican altar servers
- Cooper Ornithological Society, California, US

== Universities and schools ==
- College of the Sequoias, California, US
- College of the Siskiyous, California, US

== Other uses ==
- Childhood onset schizophrenia
- Roman consul, a political office in Ancient Rome
- COS, a fashion brand
- Chief of staff, an administrative leader
- Cos lettuce
- Martín Perfecto de Cos (1800–1854), Mexican general
- Consequence of Sound (now Consequence), a New York, US online magazine
- Cos (television series), 1976, hosted by Bill Cosby
- Space Operations Command (Italy) (Comando delle Operazioni Spaziali)
- Kos (unit) or kos, an ancient Indian measure of distance, approximately two miles

== See also ==
- Kos (disambiguation)
