= Community of Science =

Collection of online databases, providing research information to both the publi

Community of Science was a collection of online databases, providing research information to both the public and subscribers, and services for the research community. It is owned by ProQuest.

== History ==
Community of Science was founded in 1988 by Johns Hopkins University.

The Community of Science databases were originally hosted online at http://cos.gdb.org/, on the webserver of the GDB Human Genome Database. Community of Science was also accessible via U.S. Department of Agriculture CRIS, National Science Foundation, and Department of Health and Human Services.

As of 1997 the CEO and president was Huntington Williams, and the organisation was located in Baltimore, Maryland.

== Databases ==
- Community of Science Expertise
- Community of Science Funding Opportunities – categorised according to a standardised list of keywords

Canadian editions of these databases also existed.

== Services ==
- Community of Science Funding Alert
- Community of Science Funding News – published biweekly

== Access ==
The following organisations are subscribed:

- Association of Commonwealth Universities

== See also ==
- List of funding opportunity databases
