= COS (operating system) =

- Developer: Liantong Network Communications Technology, Chinese Academy of Sciences
- OS family: Linux (Unix-like)
- Working state: Current
- Source model: Closed source
- Initial release: 15 January 2014
- Marketing target: Mobile, Tablets, Set top boxes
- Supported platforms: ARM
- Kernel type: Monolithic (Linux kernel)
- Default user interface: Several GUIs
- License: Various
- Official website: www.china-cos.com

COS (China Operating System) is a Linux kernel-based mobile operating system developed in China mainly targeting mobile devices, tablets and set-top boxes. It is being developed by the Institute of Software at the Chinese Academy of Sciences (ISCAS) together with Shanghai Liantong Network Communications Technology to compete with foreign operating systems like iOS and Android. The operating system is based on Linux but the platform is closed source. Security and the risk of back doors in devices from foreign vendors are some of the main motivations for COS. Android had almost 90% of the smart phone market when COS was introduced and Apple most of the remaining market share. COS looks very similar to Android and has its own Application Portal much like Android Market and iOS App Store.

== Licensing ==
The Linux kernel is GPLv2 and the COS framework is closed source and licensed by the originators.

=== Core OS ===
The COS Core operating system is based on the Linux kernel and can be seen as a Linux distribution, in the same way as the Android operating system.

=== API ===
According to the official statements, COS supports HTML5 based applications and Java based applications.

== See also ==
- Kylin
- Linux Deepin
- Zorin OS
- StartOS
- Comparison of mobile operating systems
- List of free and open source Android applications
