= A. Jamie Cuticchia =

American geneticist (1966–2022)

- Born: December 28, 1966; Washington D.C., United States
- Died: January 6, 2022 (aged 55)
- Education: University of Maryland, Baltimore County (BA); University of Georgia (Ph.D. in Genetics); North Carolina Central University School of Law (JD)
- Occupations: Scientist; Geneticist; Lawyer; Author
- Years active: 1987–2022

Anthony James Cuticchia Jr. (December 28, 1966 – January 6, 2022) was an American scientist with expertise in the fields of genetics, bioinformatics, and genomics. In particular, he was responsible for the collection of the data constituting the human gene map, prior to the final sequencing of the genome. He was also a practicing attorney. He died due to cancer on January 6, 2022.

== Early life ==
He grew up in College Park, Maryland. He received his B.A. in Biological Sciences, with honors, from the University of Maryland, Baltimore County in 1987. In March 1992, he completed his Ph.D. in Genetics at the University of Georgia studying under population scientist Jonathan Arnold. He went on to receive a J.D. magna cum laude, from the North Carolina Central University School of Law in 2009.

== Accomplishments ==
In the late 1980s Cuticchia applied the probabilistic metaheuristic method of simulated annealing as a method for genomic mapping. Through the use of binary fingerprinting of DNA (assigning the presence or absence of a particular sequence a 1/0) it was possible to quickly map the genome of Aspergillus nidulans. This was one of the first genomes physically mapped

In addition to his work in the development of mapping tools, in 1988, along with others, he applied the Markov chain model to predict the occurrence of DNA patterns.

He was the original Data Manager of the GDB Human Genome Database and served as its director both in Toronto at The Hospital for Sick Children as well as at RTI International. He published several books on the human genome during the genetic mapping phase of the Human Genome Project.

== Career ==
- Johns Hopkins School of Medicine: In 1992 he took a position as Assistant Professor of Medical Genetics at The Johns Hopkins University School of Medicine. During that period he served as Data Manager for the GDB and later as Director of Data Acquisition and Curation. He remained an adjunct professor with Johns Hopkins until 2001.
- Mitre Corporation: In 1995 he took the position of Director of Computational Biology and developed a consulting business for the company in McLean Virginia.
- ChemGenics Pharmaceuticals: In 1997 Cuticchia moved to Boston, where he took on an executive position as Director of Genomics and Information technology at ChemGenics Pharmaceuticals. In 1998 the company was merged with Millennium Pharmaceuticals, and Cuticchia returned to academics.
- Hospital for Sick Children: In 1998 Cuticchia took the first of several roles at the HSC. Initially appointed as Director of Bioinformatics, he later raised approximately $52,000,000 in research support to form numerous projects and organizations. First, he relocated the GDB to HSC while maintaining some of its operations at Johns Hopkins. Later, he established the Ontario Center for Genomic Computing, which was one of the Top 500 supercomputing sites in the world.
- RTI International: In 2002 he returned to the United States to build a bioinformatics department at the Research Triangle Institute.
- Duke University School of Medicine: From 2006, Cuticchia served in various bioinformatics related roles at Duke. In 2008 he was named the Duke Bioinformatics Scholar and built a research portfolio in cancer bioinformatics.
- AJC Legal Services: In 2010, Cuticchia applied his newly acquired license to practice law in North Carolina focusing on biotechnology and pharmaceutical law.
- North Carolina Central University: From 2010, Cuticchia taught undergraduates and law students in courses including: Patent Law, Genetics and the Law, and FDA Regulations

== Biotechnology involvement ==
Cuticchia was a scientific founder of New Chemical Entities, a drug discovery and information company founded in 1997. In 1999 it merged with Thetagen, a provided of pharmacogenomic services. New Chemical Entities was merged with Albany Molecular Research in 2001.

== Awards ==
Cuticchia won numerous awards including:

- National Cancer Institute caBIG Outstanding Achievement Award for his work in developing bioinformatics tools for the NCI in 2007.
- Numerous awards from the Research Triangle Institute including the Presidential Award for his work in the development of bioinformatics.
- He was ranked as one of the Top Three Bioinformatics Scientists by Genome Technology in 2001.
- In 2003 he was inducted in the GT All-Stars Academy for his international contributions in bioinformatics.

== Bibliography ==
=== Books ===
- Chromosome Coordinating Meeting 1992 (CCM92 : Baltimore Conference), with P.L. Pearson, Basel: S. Karger Pub, 1993, ISBN 978-3-8055-5763-4
- Human Gene Mapping, 1993: A Compendium, Baltimore: Johns Hopkins University Press, 1994, ISBN 978-0-8018-4892-6
- Human Gene Mapping, 1994: A Compendium, Baltimore: Johns Hopkins University Press, 1995, ISBN 978-0-8018-5180-3
- Human Gene Mapping, 1995: A Compendium, Baltimore: Johns Hopkins University Press, 1996, ISBN 978-0-8018-5343-2
- Methods of Microarray Data Analysis VI, Scotts Valley: Create Space Publishing, 2009, ISBN 978-1-4414-8367-6
- Genetics: A Handbook for Lawyers, Chicago, ABA Book Publishing, 2010, ISBN 978-1-60442-969-5
- The Letter: A Satirical Look at Becoming a Lawyer, CS Publishing, 2012, ISBN 978-1-47523-633-0
