= Delhi Bridge =

- U.S. National Register of Historic Places
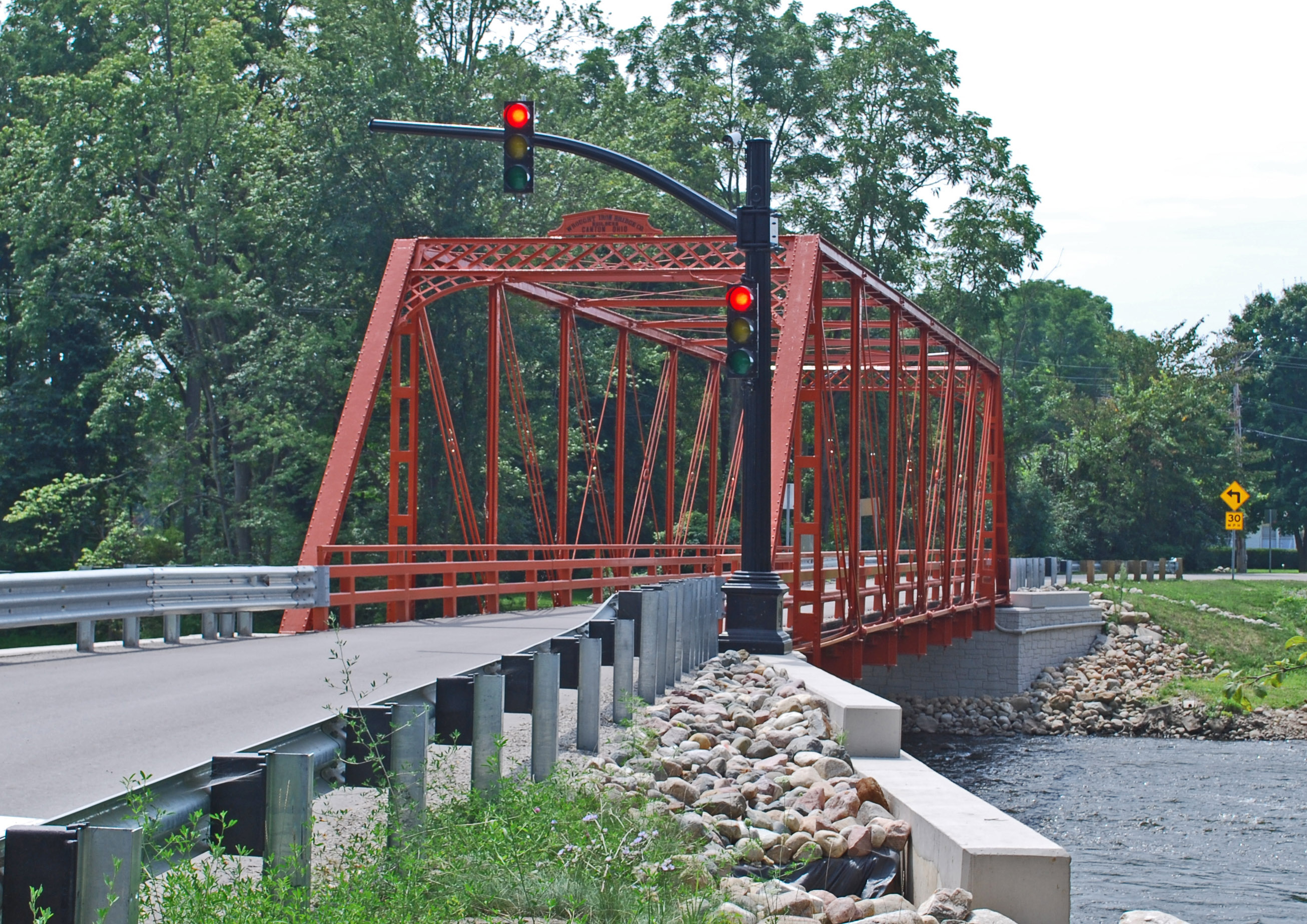
- View of the bridge from the north

- Location within Michigan Location within the United States
- Interactive map
- Location: Scio Township, Michigan
- Coordinates: 42.3337°N 83.8091°W
- Built: 1888–1890
- NRHP reference No.: 08000844
- Added to NRHP: September 4, 2008

The Delhi Bridge, also known as the East Delhi Bridge, is a one-lane, wrought iron Pratt through truss bridge that carries East Delhi Road over the Huron River in Scio Township, Michigan. The bridge was completed on October 12, 1883 to replace a wooden span built in 1851. In 1917, the bridge was severely damaged by a tornado but was rebuilt. After it was closed to traffic in 2005 for being unsafe, the bridge was renovated and reopened in 2009. The bridge is listed on the National Register of Historic Places.

== History ==
=== Early history ===
The Delhi Bridge was built by the Wrought Iron Bridge Company of Canton, Ohio. Construction was completed on October 12, 1883, replacing a wooden bridge built in 1851. The steel members were manufactured by the Trenton Iron Company and the bridge was assembled with pins instead of rivets; pin technology was discontinued after 1910. The bridge was built in Delhi Mills, a mill town founded in 1831 which declined significantly in the early twentieth century.

On June 6, 1917, a tornado swept through the town causing significant damage to the bridge, lifting it off its abutments and leaving it collapsed in a twisted heap in the river. However, the abutments were undamaged. Local tradition states that Edward Outwater and Eli Gallup salvaged the bridge from the river using a team of horses. The bridge was rebuilt in 1918 using a significant number of its original trusses, as evidenced by damage apparently due to the tornado. The bridge's portal sign was reused, though the portal webbing had to be replaced. During reconstruction of the bridge, the abutments were also rebuilt.

At some point prior to renovation, the northern abutment was covered or replaced with concrete, whereas the southern abutment was fieldstone and likely original. The Delhi Metropark, created in the 1950s, has contributed to the bridge's popularity as a tourist attraction.

=== 2005 to present ===
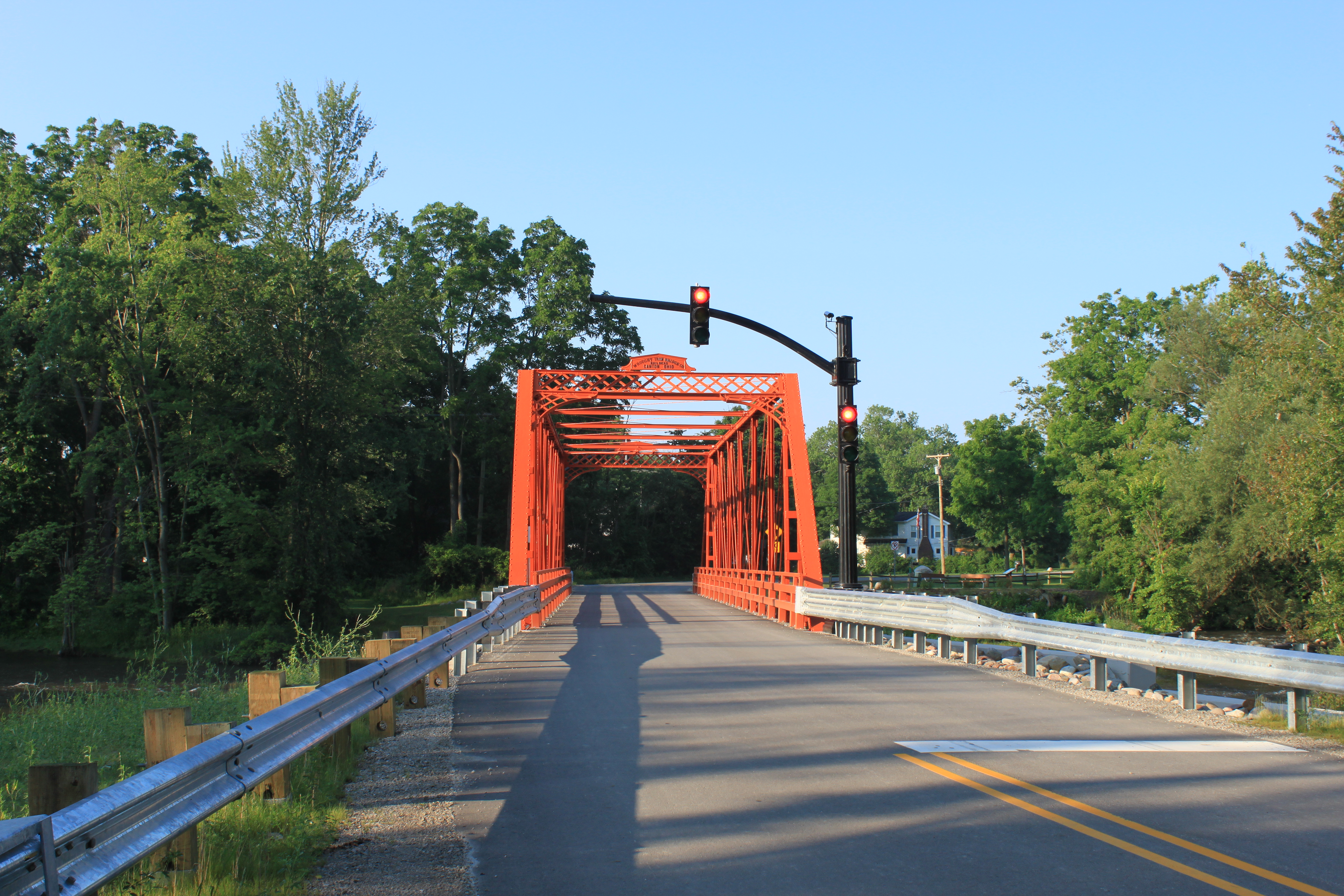
Looking down the length of the bridge

Since the tornado, the bridge has undergone few modifications apart from regular maintenance. In June 2005, an annual inspection identified that the bridge had deteriorated almost to the point of failure. In response, the Washtenaw County Road Commission closed the bridge to vehicular traffic.

In 2006, the road commission began discussing options for replacing the bridge with a two-lane concrete structure. However, residents successfully convinced the road commission otherwise as they wished to see the historic bridge rehabilitated. The East Delhi Bridge Conservancy was formed to help preserve the bridge. After conducting research, the conservancy determined that the current bridge was the same one that existed prior to the tornado. This made the rehabilitation project eligible for Local Bridge Program (LBP) funds. The Delhi Bridge was the first one-lane bridge in Michigan to receive LBP funds for rehabilitation.

Rehabilitation began in July 2008 with restoration work, including the installation of new guardrails and traffic lights. In August 2008, cranes lifted the bridge off its abutments and set it on northeastern side of the river. The bridge was repaired and painted and both abutments were replaced. The bridge previously had a dark red, rusted color, and the new color was intended to be similar, so its industrial orange shade surprised some members of the conservancy. In July 2009, the bridge was lifted off the ground and returned to its abutments, an event attended by about fifty spectators. The bridge was reopened to vehicular traffic in August 2009. A dedication ceremony was held on September 13, 2009; in lieu of a proper ribbon, yellow caution tape was used. State Representative Pam Byrnes was one of the speakers at the ceremony. Rehabilitation cost $1.2 million, with about $180,000 in additional fees. The LBP covered 95% of the $1.2 million, with the remainder spread among local groups. A twenty-year tax was enacted to cover future maintenance costs.

In July 2011, the bridge was vandalized with spray-painted graffiti.

== Historic designations ==
In 2005, the Michigan State Historic Preservation Office determined that the bridge met Criterion C (for design or construction significance) for inclusion in the National Register of Historic Places. It is one of few wrought iron Pratt through trusses in Michigan surviving from the late nineteenth century. It is also one of only five such bridges built by the Wrought Iron Bridge Company in Michigan to survive, and one of only two at their original, historic locations. In June 2007, Washtenaw County created a local historic district encompassing the bridge. On September 4, 2008, the bridge was listed on the National Register of Historic Places.

== Design ==
The bridge carries the northern end of East Delhi Road over the Huron River. The single-span, one-lane bridge has a Pratt through truss design and is made of wrought iron. Traffic lights at each end of the one-lane bridge regulate crossings.

== See also ==
- List of bridges on the National Register of Historic Places in Michigan
- National Register of Historic Places listings in Washtenaw County, Michigan
