= Border-to-Border Trail =

Partially constructed non-motorized trial system in Washtenaw

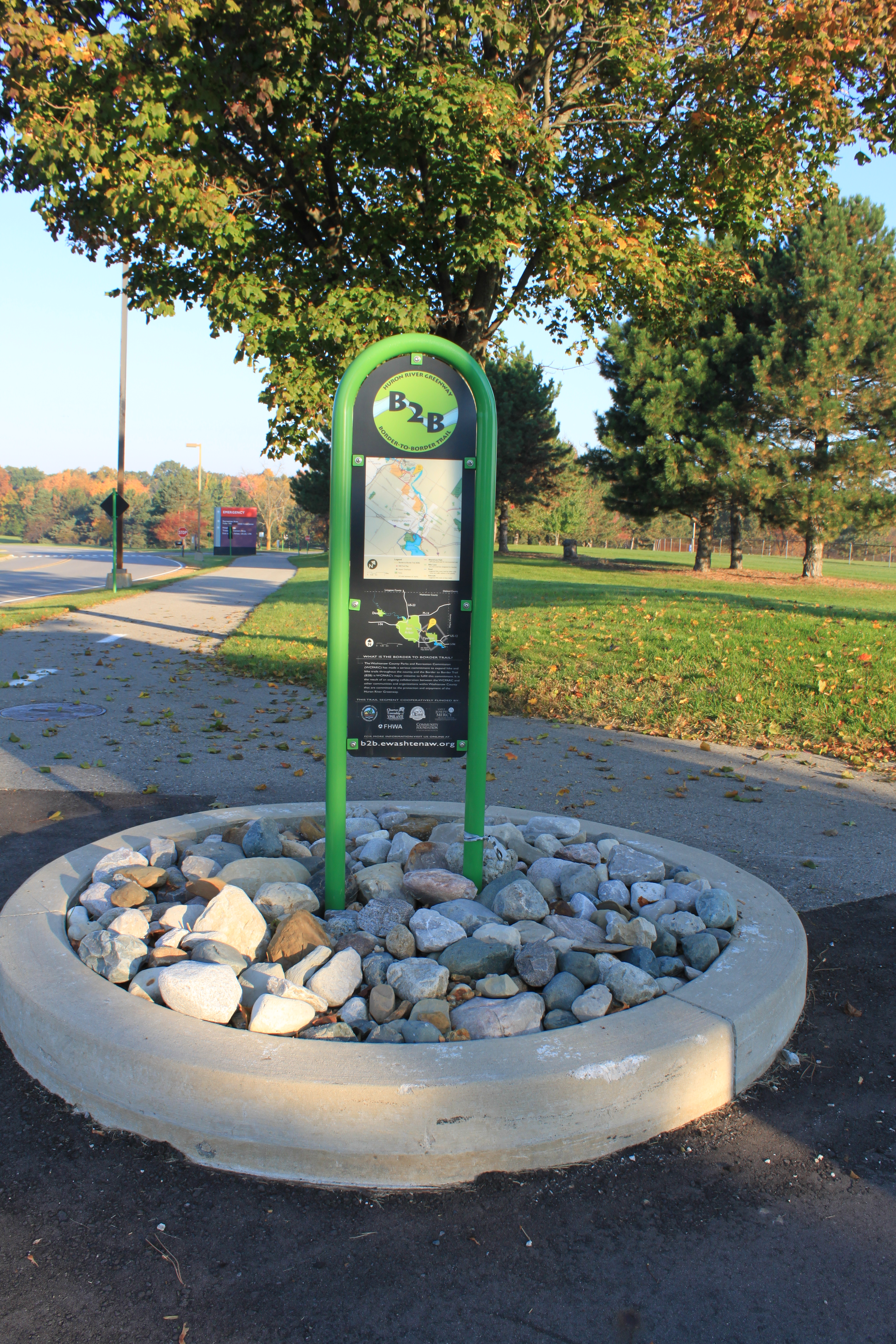
- Trail marker in Superior Township
- Length: 38 miles (61 km) as of 2023; 55 miles (89 km) planned
- Location: Washtenaw County, Michigan
- Use: Hiking, cycling
- Season: Open year-round, limited winter maintenance
- Surface: Asphalt, concrete
- Maintained by: Washtenaw County Parks and Recreation Commission
- Website: b2btrail.org
Trail map
Route within Washtenaw County

The Border-to-Border (B2B) Trail is a partially constructed non-motorized trail system in Washtenaw County, Michigan. The system is planned to cover approximately 55 miles (89 km) across Washtenaw County, along the Huron River.

Planning for the B2B began in 1984, as the Huron River Greenway, a 35-mile (56 km) project headed by Washtenaw County. Since its inception, and its renaming to the Border-to-Border trail in the 1990s, the project has expanded its scope and incorporated additional funding from public and private sources. When completed, the Border-to-Border Trail system will link Ypsilanti, Ann Arbor, Dexter, and Chelsea with off-street, non-motorized pathways for walking, bicycling, and other recreational activities.

The Border-to-Border Trail connects to multiple existing parks, and incorporates their trail systems. In addition to its route through parks, the B2B also includes segments built adjacent to rural roads, new and historic bridges, and segments on city streets.

== History ==
Planning for a non-motorized trail along the Huron River began in the 1980s, with a City of Ann Arbor study for a "Huron River Greenway." The Washtenaw County Parks and Recreation Commission took over the project in the late 1990s, and by 2001, the Border-to-Border Trail was envisioned as a 35-mile (56 km) trail from Hudson Mills Metropark to Ford Lake.

From its inception, the B2B was planned to utilize existing parks and rights-of-way adjacent to the Huron River. In addition to the existing infrastructure, Washtenaw County secured $10 million of funding to construct connections between existing pieces of infrastructure. With the cost of trail construction for even the initial plans far exceeding that sum, construction proceeded slowly, with the first new trail segment opening in 2001 in Ypsilanti.

The scope and pace of the Border-to-Border Trail project increased in the mid-2010s, with the passage of a county roads millage that included dedicated funding for nonmotorized transportation projects. The state of Michigan recognized the B2B project as a component of the statewide Iron Belle Trail in 2015, bringing additional visibility to the project.

The mid-2010s also brought additional private funding to the trail, with expansion plans for a segment from Dexter west to Chelsea. The Huron Waterloo Pathways Initiative, a private foundation that began in Chelsea, raised money from businesses in Chelsea before partnering with the county to accelerate trail construction.

In 2016, champion triathlete Karen McKeachie died in a collision on Dexter-Chelsea Road during a training bicycle ride. McKeachie's death led to renewed advocacy for additional bicycle safety measures in the county, and a portion of the newly-constructed B2B trail near Dexter is named in McKeachie's memory.

== Future ==
The total cost of constructing the trail was estimated at $30 million in 2019, with additional fundraising still under way to fund the entire project.

The most difficult portion of trail construction will be the segment from Hudson Mills Metropark east to Bandemer Park, which closely follows the Huron River and Huron River Drive. As of June 2024, planning is underway for this segment, which will include a tunnel under the Michigan Line railroad tracks.

The B2B is planned to extend northwards from its two branches in western Washtenaw County, connecting to the Lakelands Trail. The extensions, to Stockbridge and Pinckney, will form a 29-mile (47 km) loop in Washtenaw and Livingston counties. Additional plans for trail construction in Washtenaw County include extensions south to the existing trail systems in Manchester, Saline, and Pittsfield Township.

== Route description ==
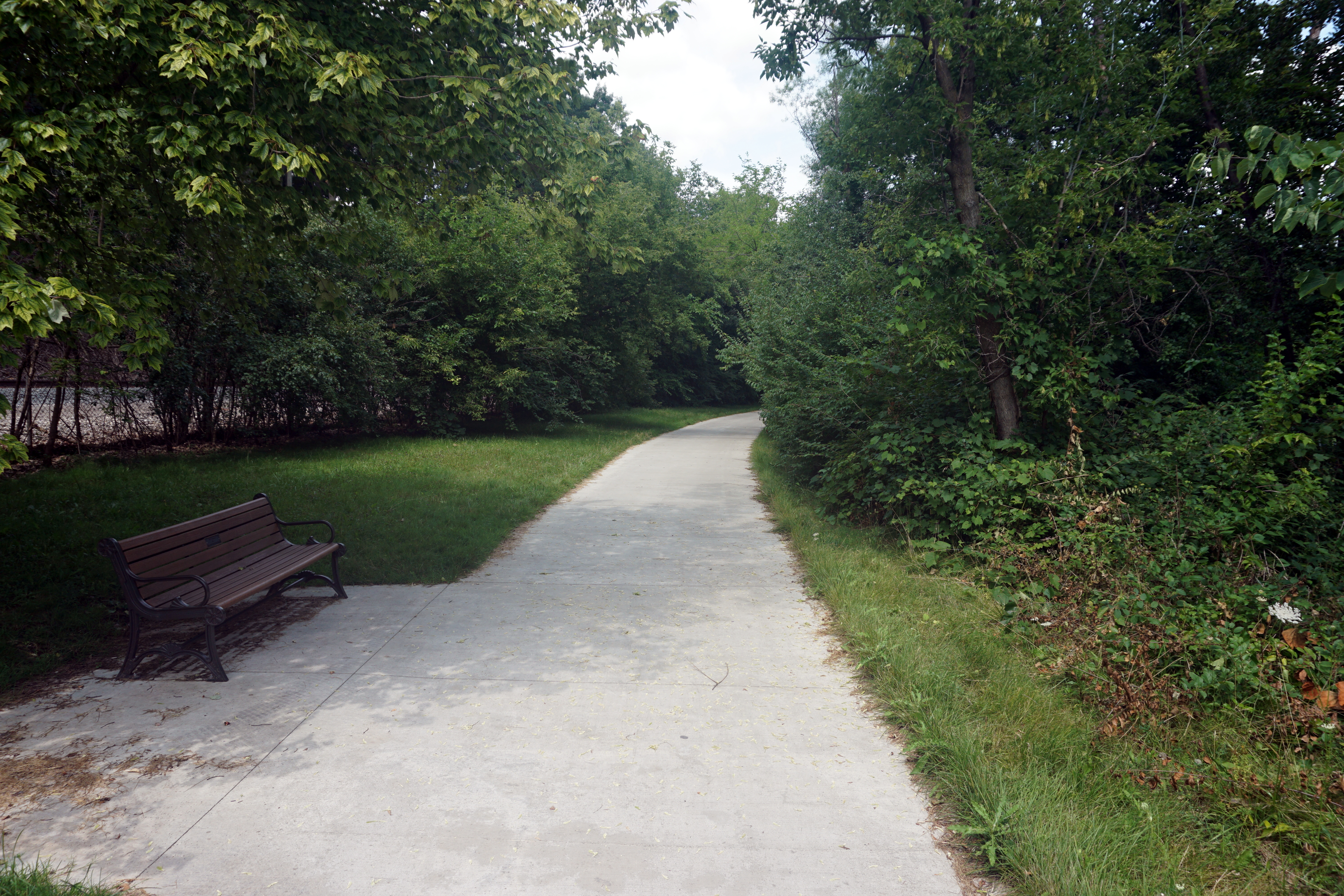
The Border-to-Border Trail in Gallup Park in Ann Arbor

The Chelsea branch of the B2B originates in Dexter Township, near the Livingston County line in the northwest corner of the county. The trail follows M-52 south to Chelsea city limits, deviating through Timbertown Park. The B2B uses city streets through Chelsea, and heads due east, paralleling Dexter-Chelsea Road and the Michigan Line railroad tracks to Dexter.

The Hudson Mills branch of the B2B originates north of the Hudson Mills Metropark and proceeds south through the park, connecting to the Chelsea branch at Mill Creek Park in Dexter.

From Dexter east to Ann Arbor, the B2B follows Huron River Drive in a general southeasterly direction, connecting to Delhi Metropark. The B2B enters Ann Arbor city limits near Barton Nature Area, and is proposed to cross under the Michigan Line tracks in a tunnel to Bandemer Nature Area. From Bandemer east, the trail utilizes city park land along the river, and runs close to the University of Michigan Hospital and the Ann Arbor VA Hospital. Near the VA Hospital, the trail enters Gallup Park, and runs east to Geddes Dam at the Ann Arbor city limits.

The B2B recrosses the Huron River twice at Geddes Dam and Dixboro Road, passing through the campus of Washtenaw Community College. The trail follows the northern edge of the Trinity Health Ann Arbor Hospital campus, and heads due south to the athletic campus of Eastern Michigan University, at Ypsilanti city limits. At the George Gervin GameAbove Center, the trail turns due east and follows a utility right-of-way to the EMU main campus, and through the campus to a path parallel to North Huron River Drive. The B2B uses city streets to Depot Town, where it enters Frog Island and Riverside Parks, and passes through the southern edge of the Water Street site. The trail emerges from parkland at Grove Street, near the site of Woodruff's Grove, the first European settlement in Washtenaw County.

East of Ypsilanti city limits, in Ypsilanti Charter Township, the B2B follows Grove Street along the north bank of Ford Lake, heading south into North Hydro Park at Ford Lake Dam. The trail terminates at Grove Road and Rawsonville Road, at the Wayne County line. A connection is planned into Van Buren Township, ultimately forming a part of the Iron Belle Trail towards Belle Isle.

== Construction progress ==
Border-to-Border Trail construction progress by segment
Segment	Project limits	Length (miles)	Community	Funding estimate (year)	Funding source	Status
A	Livingston Co. to Bell Road	1.7	Dexter Township	$584,000 (2006)	TBD	Concept
B	Bell Road to North Territorial Rd.	1.3	Dexter Township	$447,000 (2006)	TBD	Concept
C	North Territorial Rd. to Dexter	4.7	Dexter Township	$1,614,000 (2006)	TBD	See below
C1	Hudson Mills Metropark Phase 1	2.1	Dexter Township	?	HCMA, WCPARC, Community foundation for Southeastern Michigan, Michigan Department of Natural Resources	Completed 2008
C2B	Hudson Mills Metropark Phase 2	2.0? / 3.0?	Dexter Township	$725,000	HCMA, WCPARC, Village of Dexter	Planned (2012)
C2A	Westridge Subdivision to Warrior Park	0.25	Village of Dexter	??	??	Completed 2012
D1	River Terrace Trail, Village of Dexter to Dexter-Huron Metropark	1.4	Village of Dexter / Dexter Township	$481,000 (2006) / $990,000 (2010)	WCPARC, others to be determined	Underway (fall 2012)
D2	Park Connector Trail, Dexter-Huron Metropark to Delhi Metropark	2.9	Scio Township	$996,000 (2006) / $1,500,000 (2012)	TBD	Concept / budgeted for 2012
E	Delhi Metropark to Tubbs Road	1.0	Scio Township	$344,000 (2006)	TBD	Concept
F	Tubbs Road to Maple Road	1.5	Scio Township	$515,000 (2006)	TBD	Concept
G	Maple Road to Barton Pond	2.2	Ann Arbor City	$756,000 (2006)	TBD	Concept
H	Ann Arbor West Barton Pond to Mitchell Field	3.0	City of Ann Arbor	$1,030,000 (2006)	??	Partially complete
H?	Bandemer Park Railroad Tunnel from Bandemer Park to Barton Park Bridge	??	City of Ann Arbor	$2,555,595 (2010)	City of Ann Arbor	Unfunded
I	Ann Arbor East Mitchell Field to Dixboro Road	3.0	City of Ann Arbor	$1,030,000 (2006)	??	Complete
J	Dixboro Road to Hewitt Road	2.5	Ann Arbor Township/Ypsilanti Township	$858,000 (2006)	WCPARC Community foundation for Southeastern Michigan Michigan Department of Transportation	Completed 2004
J?	Washtenaw Community College	0.32	??	??	WCPARC	Completed 2008
K	Hewitt Road to Michigan Avenue	2.5	City of Ypsilanti	$858,000 (2006)	City of Ypsilanti, Michigan Department of Natural Resources	Partially complete
K1	Hewitt Road, Eastern Michigan University (EMU) Rail Trail to Huron River Drive, Huron River Drive to Westview with connection to the Rail Trail	0.75	City of Ypsilanti	??	WCPARC and EMU	Completed 2009
K2	EMU Rail Trail reconstruction, Hewitt to Cornell and extension to EMU Student Union	0.75	City of Ypsilanti	??	WCPARC and EMU	Completed 2008 and 2009
L	Michigan Avenue to Ford Lake	1.5	City of Ypsilanti	$515,000 (2006)	TBD	Partially complete
L?	Bike bridge under the Michigan Avenue Bridge	??	City of Ypsilanti	$500,000 (2010)	TBD	Concept
L1	I-94 to Ford Lake	0.2	Ypsilanti Township	$69,000 (2006)	TBD	Partially complete
L?	Grove Road	0.15	??	??	WCPARC	Complete
L?	River's Edge Park, also known as Water Street Trail	1.0	City of Ypsilanti	??	City of Ypsilanti, Community Foundation for Southeastern Michigan, WCPARC / Volunteers	On hold / gravel trail complete
M	Ford Lake to Wayne County	4.0	Ypsilanti Township	$1,373,000 (2006)	TBD	Partially complete
M1	Ypsilanti Township, Hydro Park North/Bridge Road (bike lanes)	0.33	Ypsilanti Township	$159,000	Ypsilanti Township, Hydro Park North/Bridge Road	Scheduled to complete in 2011 as part of another overlap project
M2	Bridge Road/Textile to Wayne County Border	1.0	Ypsilanti Township	$197,000	WCPARC	Scheduled to complete in 2010
