= Ebrary =

Former online digital library

ebrary
- Producer: ProQuest (United States)
- History: 1999–2015

Access
- Cost: Subscription

Links
- Website: www.ebrary.com

ebrary (the "e" is lower case) was an online digital library which held over 100,000 scholarly e-books in 2014. It was available in many academic libraries and provided a set of online database collections that combined scholarly books from over 435 academic, trade, and professional publishers. It also included sheet music (9,000 titles) and government documents. Additionally, ebrary offered a service called "DASH!" for customers to distribute their own PDF content online.

ebrary had 2,700 subscribers (mostly libraries) at the end of 2009. Users gained access through a subscribing library and could view, search, copy, and print documents from their computers.

ebrary was founded in 1999 by friends Christopher Warnock and Kevin Sayar. It was headquartered in Palo Alto, California, and was acquired by ProQuest in 2011. In 2015, ProQuest replaced ebrary with ProQuest Ebook Central. Before it was replaced, it held over 900,000 documents.

== Reception ==
Staffordshire University in England supplied texts to ebrary and encouraged use by students and faculty. A study of usage there reported, "The ability for students and researchers to search across the full content of 30,000 e‐books in one 'go' and then capture that information quickly and easily is also very valuable." At Hacettepe University, a large school in Turkey, usage had proven valuable because of the limited library collection.

More generally, Anne Morris and Panos Balatsoukas reported that other universities also had studied usage and considered ebrary a valuable resource.

== Journal articles ==
- Fialkoff, Francine. "The Book Is Not Dead," Library Journal, (June 15, 2009) Vol. 134 Issue 11
- Godwin-Jones, Robert. "E-Books and the Tablet PC," Language, Learning & Technology Vol. 7, 2003
- Mullarkey, Marty. "Ebrary and two international e-Book surveys." The Acquisitions Librarian 19.3–4 (2008): 213–230.
- Qiuping, Zhang, and Yuan Hao. "Integration of Ebrary Electronic Books to OPAC System." Library Journal 1 (2008): 007.
- Raisinghani, Mahesh S. "Wireless Library Aids Student Productivity," T H E Journal Vol. 30, 2002
