= Hudson Mills Metropark =

Park in Washtenaw County, Michigan, United States

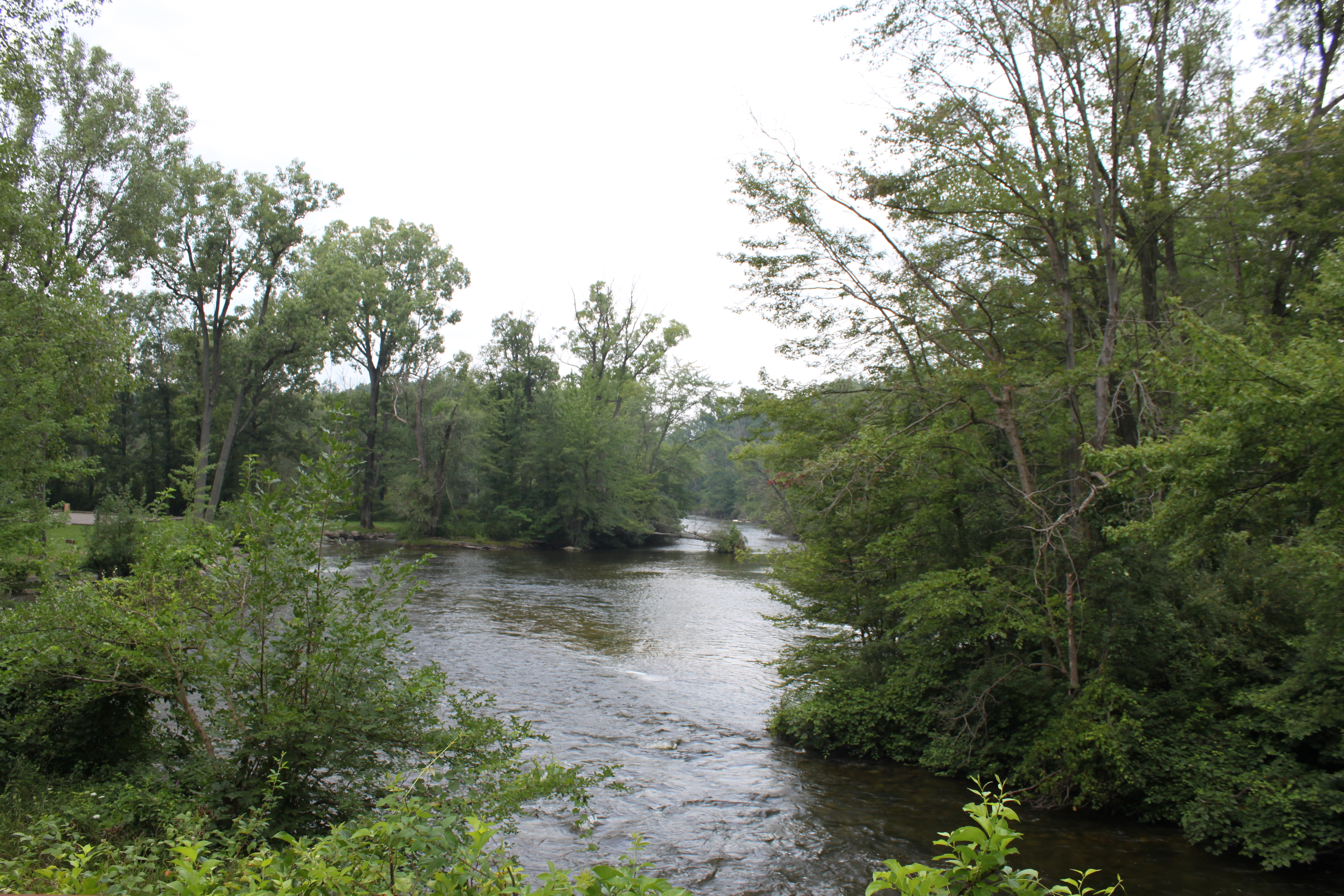
- Huron River, Rapids View area

- Location within Huron-Clinton Metroparks
- Type: Regional park
- Location: Lower Peninsula, Washtenaw County, Michigan USA
- Coordinates: 42°23′11.58″N 83°54′30.63″W
- Area: 1,549 acres (627 ha)
- Operator: Huron–Clinton Metroparks
- Status: Open year round
- Website: Official site

Hudson Mills Metropark is a park in the Huron-Clinton system of metro parks in Michigan, USA. It is located on North Territorial Road at the crossing of the Huron River, twelve miles (19 km) northwest of Ann Arbor. The park covers 1,549 acres (627 hectares) and has an 18-hole golf course, disc golf courses, picnic areas, swings and slides, softball diamonds, a hike-bike trail, nature trails, river fishing, a canoe camp and a group camp. The park is a popular destination for canoeing and kayaking; parking areas near the Huron River provide access for canoe launching. The park is linked to Dexter-Huron Metropark and Delhi Metropark via the Border-to-Border Trail. Canoe rentals are available at Delhi Metropark.

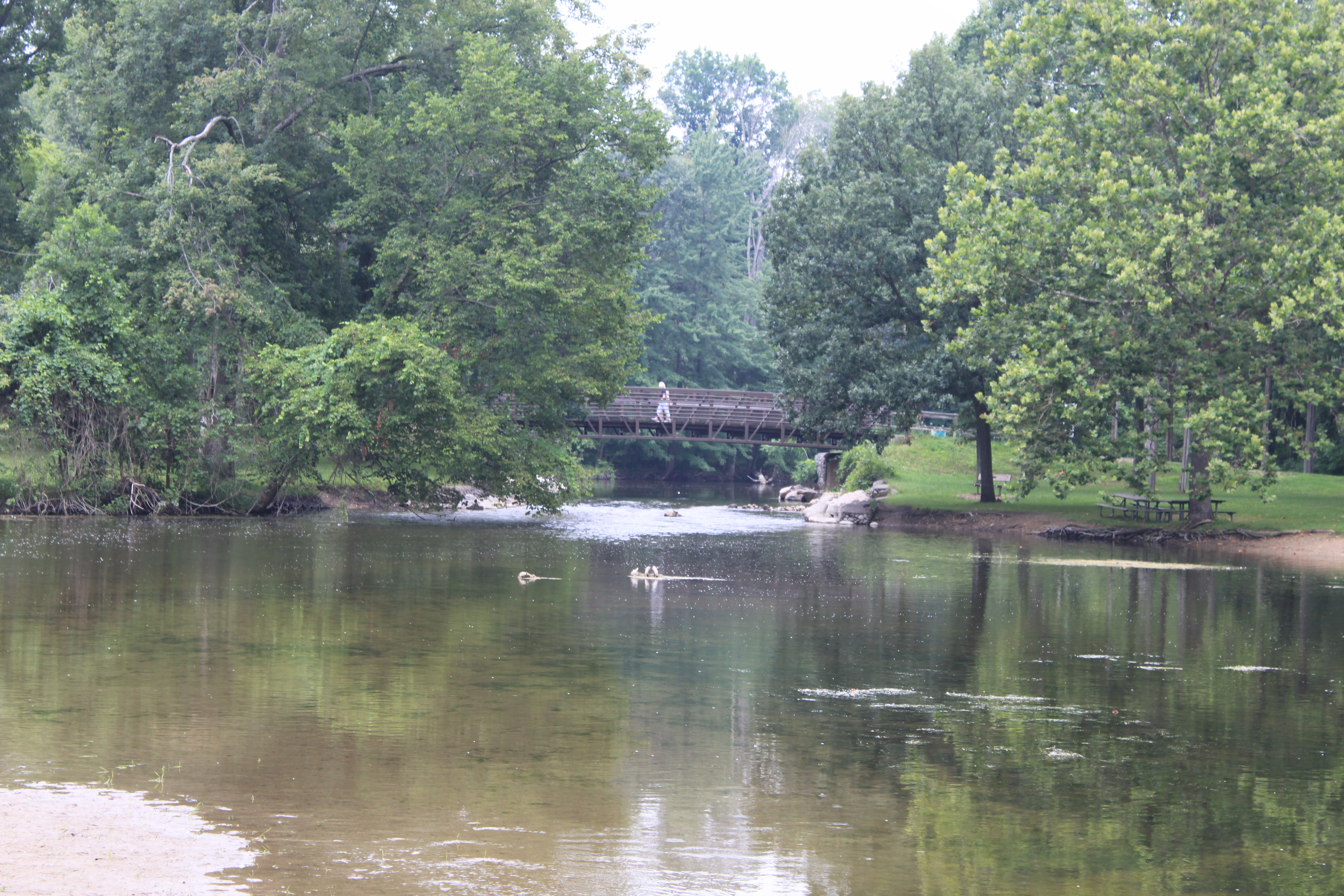
River Grove area
