= YLMF Computer Technology Co., Ltd. =

Computer software company based in Dongguan, Guangdong, China

YLMF Computer Technology Co., Ltd. is a computer software company based in Dongguan, Guangdong, China. The company was founded in May 2005, their most significant product to most of the world (including English speaking countries), was the Ubuntu based Linux distribution Ylmf OS.

== History ==
YLMF was founded in May 2005 with a registered capital of RMB 10 million at Songshan Lake, Dongguan, Guangdong.

== Products ==
- 114la.com
- StartOS
- 115.com
