= Dexter–Huron Metropark =

Park in Washtenaw County, Michigan, United States

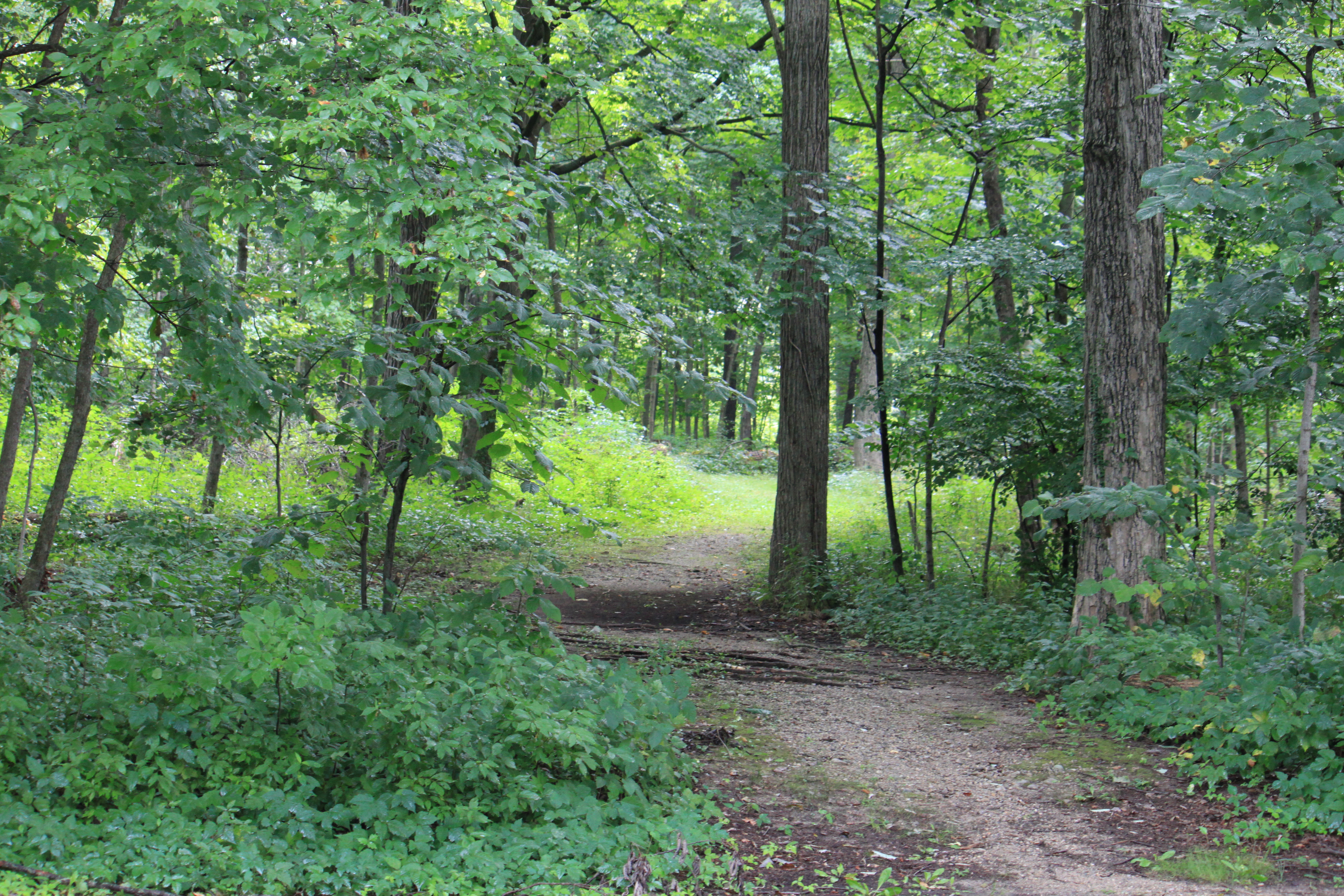
- Nature trail

- Location within Huron-Clinton Metroparks
- Type: Regional park
- Location: Lower Peninsula, Washtenaw County, Michigan USA
- Coordinates: 42°19′47.32″N 83°51′35.52″W
- Area: 122 acres (49 ha)
- Operator: Huron–Clinton Metroparks
- Open: Year round
- Website: Official site

Dexter–Huron Metropark is a 122-acre (0.49 km^{2}) park on the Huron River in the Huron-Clinton system of metro parks. The park has three picnic areas, a children's play area, a softball diamond, fishing, and canoe launching. A Metropark daily or annual vehicle permit is required for entry. The park will eventually be linked to Hudson Mills Metropark and Delhi Metropark via the Border-to-Border Trail.

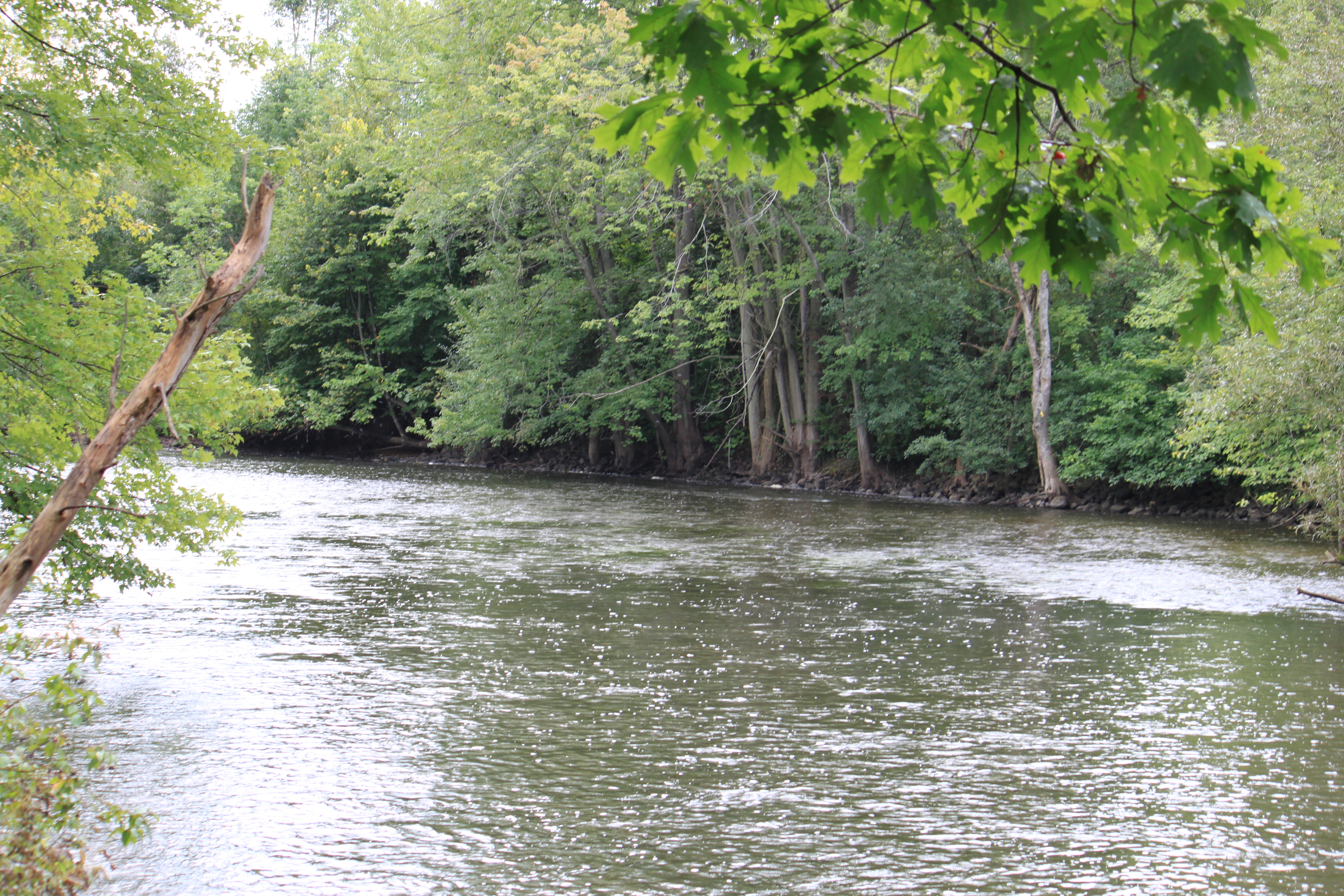
View of Huron River

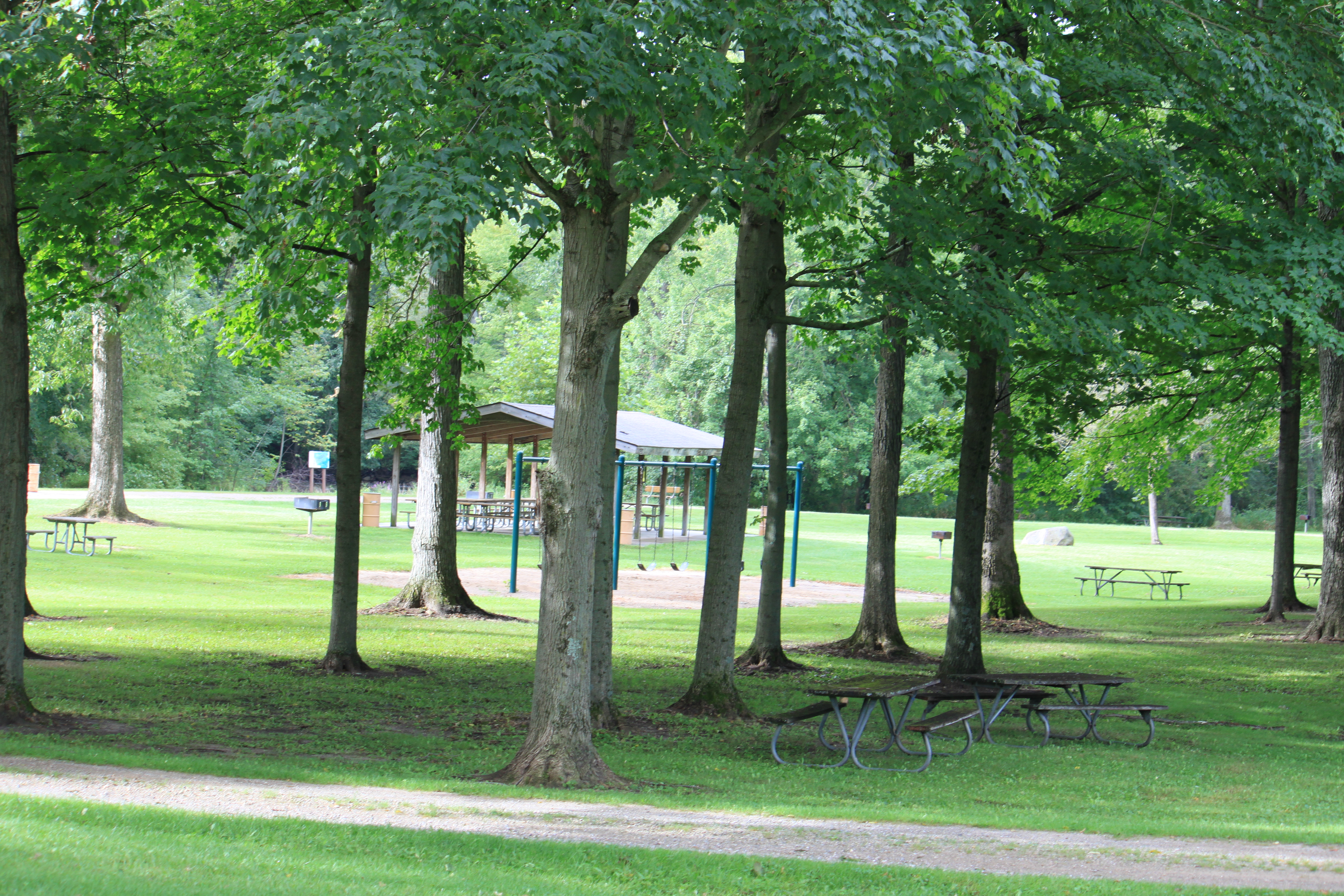
Picnic area
