= Water Street Redevelopment Area =

Multi-decade redevelopment project

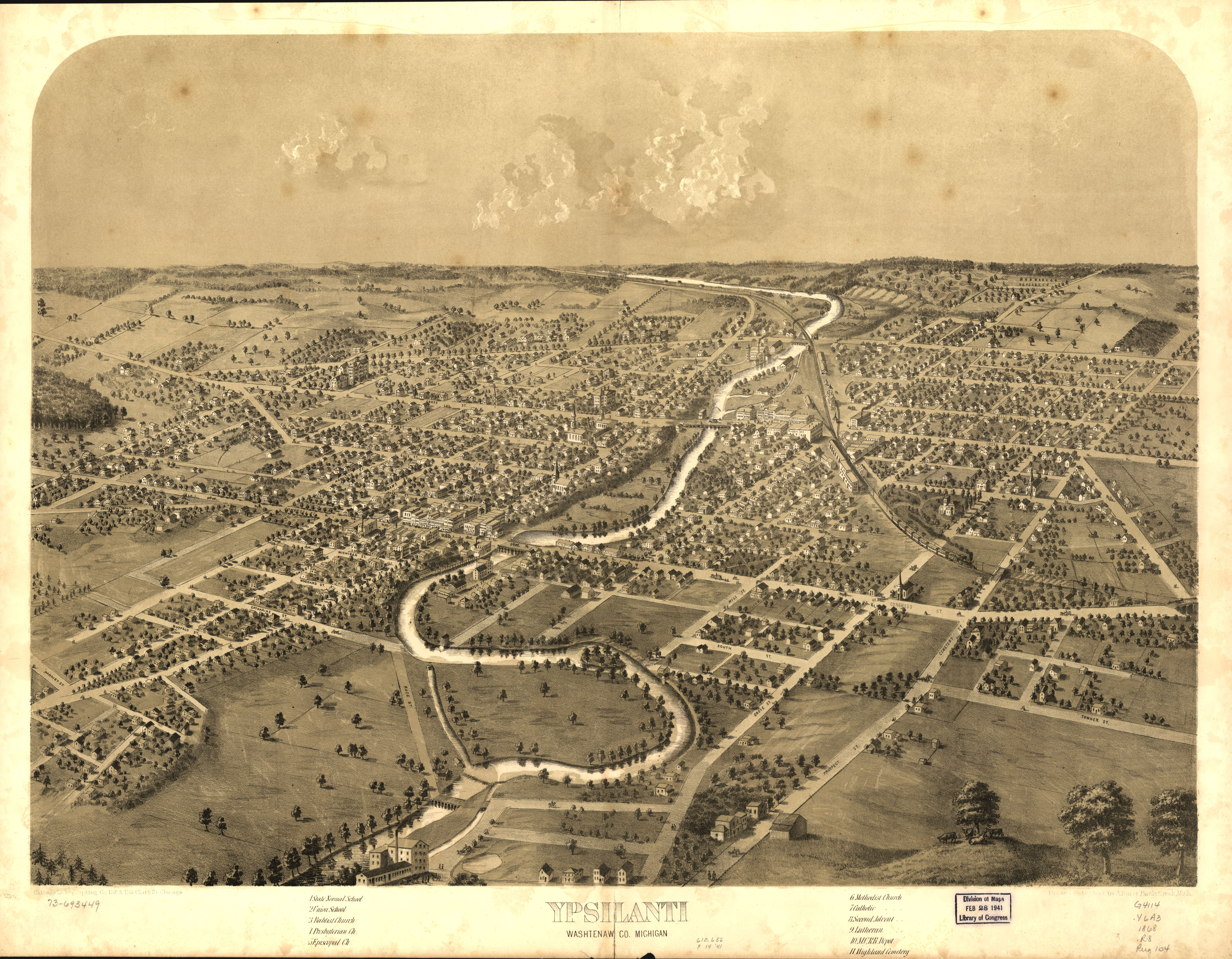
Historical drawing that includes portions of what is currently known as the Water Street Redevelopment Area

Water Street is a brownfield in Ypsilanti, Michigan which used to be a site of various industries and businesses. In 1999, under the leadership of Cheryl Farmer, the City of Ypsilanti officially embarked on a project to redevelop the area to improve the general image of Ypsilanti and increase its tax revenue. Unsuccessful negotiations with developers and contamination have prevented the project from progressing. The city's goal to develop higher density tax generating property stemmed from the passing of the Headlee Amendment and Proposition A which resulted in limitations on property tax increases. Businesses and residents displaced by the proposed development attribute the blight and low taxable value of the area to the city's failure to provide and maintain municipal services and infrastructure. Michigan Department of Environment, Great Lakes, and Energy (EGLE) includes parcels at Water street in the list of over 24,000 contaminated sites in Michigan, of which only 3,000 have been remediated in the last three decades. The contamination of the site is similar to other brownfield sites linked to the Automotive industry. Ypsilanti is among other municipalities in the state of Michigan with brownfield sites that remain undeveloped.

== Geography ==
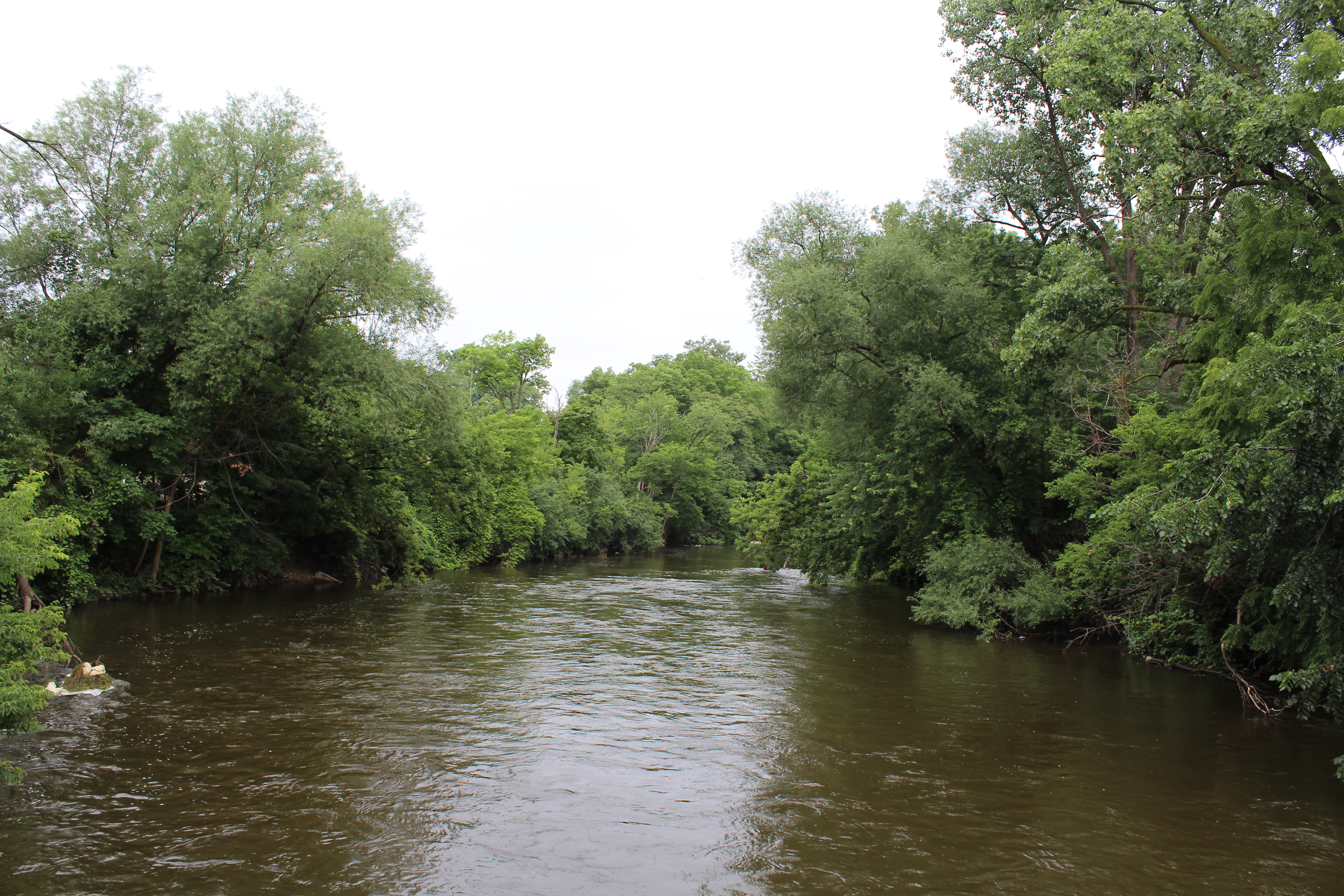

Water Street is a single 38-acre parcel near Ypsilanti's downtown area. The area is bordered by Michigan Avenue to the North, the Huron River to the West and South, and South and Park Streets to the East. Prior to being U.S. Route 12 in Michigan, the road on the North side used to be named Congress Street.

== History ==
Prior to the 1800s, Native Americans primarily inhabited the land around Ypsilanti and the river. The Potawatomi and Sauk trails passed by what is currently the Water Street area. Native peoples were removed from the area starting in 1816 and continuing until 1830. The first settler occupants on the land of the Water Street Redevelopment area were in the 1800s. Harwood's flouring mill was constructed in 1829 and positioned along the river just south of Congress Street, now known as Michigan Avenue. In the second half of the 19th century, Alva Worden and his brothers John and Chauncey lived in mansions on this land and manufactured their invention, a new whip socket, in the same area.

In the 1900s the land began to be developed and over the next 100 years it was the site of industries and businesses such as parks, a railroad, a lumber mill, a plastics factory, a heating and cooling business, restaurants and car dealerships.

=== Historic District/Amazing Quarter Mile ===
The stretch of land along U.S. Route 12 in Michigan became a hub for car dealerships starting in 1912 when the first car dealership opened. This area has been referred to as "The Amazing Quarter Mile" and was eventually added to the Ypsilanti historic district. Various businesses occupied the buildings on U.S. Route 12 in Michigan such as Ypsilanti Savings Bank, Markham's Restaurant, Moorman's Lumber Yard, Serbay Motors, Silkworth's Gas Station and Auto Repair, Sesi Lincoln Mercury. The last car dealership on the South side of this stretch closed in the 1990s.

=== List of businesses and parks ===
Prior to the redevelopment project, the area has been home to businesses, residences and parks:

- Arlan's shopping center
- Booth Newspapers, Inc.
- Campus Buick, Honda, and GMC
- Lee's Chop Suey Restaurant - 160 E Michigan Ave
- Commerce Motor Truck Co./Dura Corp.
- Davis Motor Sales
- Detroit Harvester Co
- Detroit United Railway
- Doran Chevrolet Co
- Forest Avenue Baptist Church
- First Class Cleaning Supply & Flooring
- Gilbert Park
- Greene's Cleaner & Dryers, Inc.
- Harwood's Flouring mill
- JJ's Hair Salon and Car Wash
- Joseph Thompson Inc.
- Lee's Takeout
- Logan's Landscaping
- Lowell's Towing
- Markham's Restaurant
- Moorman's Lumber Yard
- Plasber Inc
- Public Square
- Richards Desoto Plymouth
- River's Edge Park
- Serbay Motors
- Sesi Lincoln Mercury
- Silkworth's Gas Station and Auto Repair
- Speedy Printing
- Vincent Chevrolet
- Walters Heating and Cooling
- Wireless Toyz
- Ypsi Automotive Parts
- Ypsi Iron & Metal
- Ypsilanti Press
- Ypsilanti Savings Bank
- Ypsilanti Tractor Sales Inc.

== Timeline of the Redevelopment Project ==
1980: Ypsilanti contractor, Walter E. Duke, purchases an old building on Water Street south of Michigan Ave for $5,000 as part of the city's anti-blight program. The city and the contractor agree that the site will be renovated to be an "oil recycling facility" and include "riverside recreational areas."

1983: City of Ypsilanti sues contractor, Walter E. Duke, for breach of contract. They cite failure to pay taxes and to complete agreed upon renovations of the property. The contractor states that he was unable to secure federal or local financing for the $350,000 required for the project.

1990: A group called "Ypsilanti 2000" forms to discuss ways to improve the city and improve its image. One idea is to redevelop the Water Street site and tear down the vacant buildings.

1992: The city hires consulting firm Hyett-Palma to investigate the benefits of assembling the land and pursuing its redevelopment. The study endorses the redevelopment project and forecasts increased property tax revenue.

1995: The state of Michigan rolls back a 1990 “polluters pay” law under Governor John Engler. This new legislation loosened polluter liability and impacted how contamination is remediated and where funding for cleanup efforts comes from. The rollback lessened the amount of required remediation of contaminated land.

1999: The city conducts a community charrette to gauge community interest in the project, and decides to move forward with the project.

2000: The City Council includes the Water Street Redevelopment Area as part of the Downtown Development Authority District.

2001: The city selects Biltmore Properties to develop the property.

2003: A group of Ypsilanti residents, who had concerns about various aspects of the project, meet with the Mayor and other city officials to communicate their concerns. The city demolishes the first six buildings in May. City officials initiate condemnation lawsuits against the owners of some of the properties after acquisition negotiations fail.

2004: In early January, the city begins the second demolition phase and removes eight buildings. The city completes purchase of the land and begins contamination cleanup. The city announces that the site is more contaminated than they initially expected. The city of Ypsilanti ends the development contract with Biltmore Properties.

2005: The city announces they will pay Biltmore $725,000 in return for data and documents created by Biltmore through their due diligence process.

2006: The city selects Joseph Freed and Associates as a new developer. In the same year, the developer left the project citing economic concerns.

2008: In June, the city hires CB Richard Ellis Inc. to help them market the project across the nation.

2010: The city holds a small ceremony on the site of Water Street to celebrate the beginning phase of the final building demolitions. The city council rejects a proposal to build a Burger King on one acre of land at Water Street.

2011: The city begins having conversations with Washtenaw County Parks and Recreation about developing a Recreation Center in the area.

2012: The city approves a Family Dollar development on the site. The city initiates the creation of a tree nursery on the East side of Water Street.

2013: A group of local activists and artists begin using Water Street as a meeting place, which is known as the Water Street Commons. Members of the Water Street Commons build structures and art installations in 2013 and the following years. On May 1st, a May Day event takes place which includes seed-bombing the land in hopes of growing native flowers.

2014: The construction begins for a Family Dollar store on about one acre of the redevelopment area. The city starts work with Herman and Kittle Properties on an affordable housing project to be built on a portion of the Water Street Redevelopment area. The developer proposes the name Riverwalk Commons for the project.

2015: Family Dollar construction completes. A proposed development with Herman and Kittle Property ends because Michigan State Housing Development Authority determines land is unsafe for residential housing due to contamination.

2016: After talks about a Washtenaw County, Michigan Recreation Center at the site, the project fails due to the high cost of remediation and development. The city closes a stretch of the Border to Border Trail, which runs through the Water Street Redevelopment Area along the river's edge, due to newfound contamination and concern for public safety.

2017: International Village Advisory LLC submits a letter of intent to the city proposing a mixed use development, specializing in housing and amenities for Chinese residents and tourists. After city officials travel to China on a trip paid for by the developer, the city council initiates an investigation into the legality of the trip. After the controversy, the project did not proceed.

2020: A developer called Kaufman Jacobs proposes a mixed-use project.

2023: Two developers, J29:7 and Renovare, present mixed use developments to the projects. The city puts the proposals on hold when environmental consultants find that contamination from PCBs is "much more" than expected.

== Brownfield status and contamination ==
The Water Street Redevelopment Area is part of more than 24,000 contaminated sites in Michigan. Several different contaminants have been found in the soil such as PCBs, Heavy metals, Volatile organic compound, BTEX and PNAs. Businesses associated with the Water Street redevelopment area no longer exist, and as a result cannot be held liable for cleaning up any contamination. Contaminated property that can’t “be tied to polluters because they are no longer in business, bankrupt, unfindable or otherwise able to escape liability” are referred to as “orphaned.” In order to gather granular data about the site’s contamination, the city commissioned a site assessment of soil and groundwater by parcel from the Traverse Group. In 2016 the city received grant money for further testing which revealed more contamination. The city put up a fence around the most toxic areas. The city then fenced-in area is the former site of Commerce Motor Truck Co. and a Dura Corp. manufacturing facility as well as a junk yard. In 2023, environmental consultants - AKT Peerless reported to the city that contamination was more extensive than previously known, halting Water Street Redevelopment plans. According to the environmental consultants, the contamination in these parcels is considered hazardous waste due to the high parts-per-million (ppm) of PCBs in the top few feet of soil. In an interview with Local 4 WDIV in May 2024, city officials shared that development might be possible "within a year or two."

== Opposition and controversy ==
Residents and business owners have objected to the project based on the projected and actual costs. As early as 2000 Ypsilanti residents were voicing concern about this project In the process of acquiring the properties, city officials filed lawsuits against property owners with whom they could not reach a purchase agreement. The city and those property owners settled and the city purchased all of the properties. Altogether the city paid over $7-million for all of the properties, exceeding their initial budget. On November 1, 2005, Ypsilanti resident and developer Bob Doyle delivered a letter to the Mayor and City Council describing in great detail the history of the Water Street project and why he opposed the current plan.

In 2005, after breaking ties with Biltmore, the city paid $725,000 to purchase information that was developed by Biltmore in preparation for project construction. Residents of the city became concerned that part of the $750,000 paid to the developer would come from the city's general fund, not grants and loans. The city manager had pledged in the beginning of the project that no general fund dollars would be used, but shared with the Ann Arbor News in 2007 that the city had no other way to pay the debts.

In 2016, the city filed a lawsuit against a local artist who helped organize and build a sculpture park which was part of the Water Street Commons. The lawsuit followed the discovery of more contamination at the site. In the lawsuit, the city requested all the sculptures be taken down and the individual stay off of the city property. The Water Street Commons originally had a permit to be on the land, but after it expired, the Commons became illegal. The case never went before a judge and city and artist chose to resolve the dispute through a stipulation order with the same requests of the lawsuit. The mayor at the time, Amanda Edmonds, responded to criticism of the suit by blaming media headlines for being misleading.

In 2017, city officials went on a trip to China which was paid for by the developer behind the International Village mixed use development proposal. The Mayor at the time, Amanda Edmonds attend this trip, as well as, Ypsilanti Director of Economic Development Beth Ernat, Mayor Pro Tem Nicole Brown, and Police Chief Tony DeGiusti. The trip happened in September 2017 and afterwards an investigation was launched into the legality of the trip. Mayor Pro Tem Brown and Police Chief DeGuisti were not found guilty of misconduct at that time. Mayor Edmonds and Beth Ernat were accused of carelessness. The city did not renew its contract with Ernat and Mayor Edmonds did not run for re-election.
