= Delhi Metropark =

Park in Washtenaw County, Michigan, United States

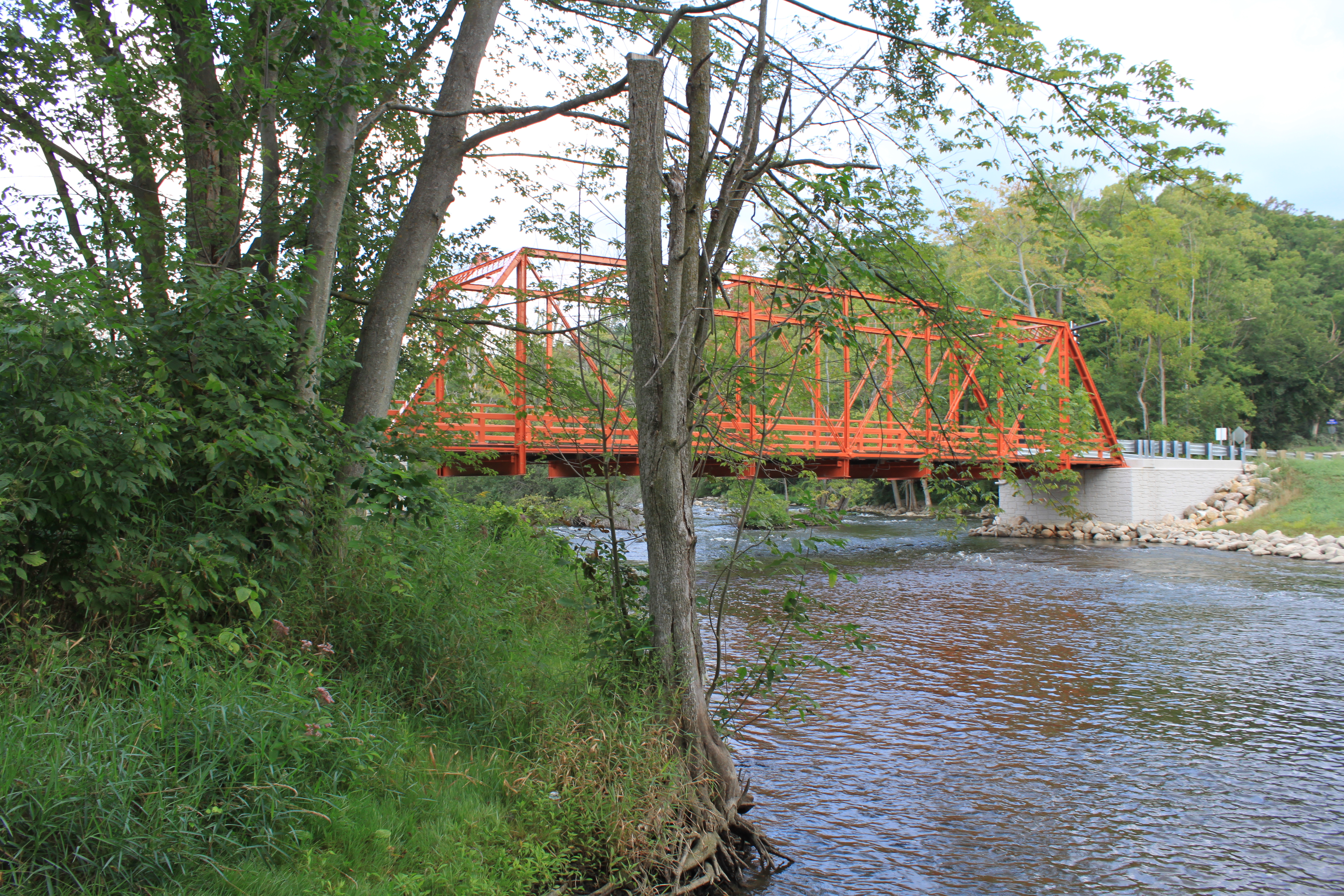
- View of Delhi Bridge

- Location within Huron-Clinton Metroparks
- Type: Regional park
- Location: Lower Peninsula, Washtenaw County, Michigan USA
- Coordinates: 42°19′50.51″N 83°48′29.43″W
- Area: 81 acres (33 ha)
- Operator: Huron–Clinton Metroparks
- Open: Year round
- Website: Official site

Delhi Metropark is a park in the Huron-Clinton system of metro parks. It is an 81-acre (330,000 m^{2}) park on the Huron River located five miles (8 km) northwest of Ann Arbor. It has picnic areas, two picnic shelters, swings and slides, river fishing, canoe rental and softball diamonds. A children's playground features an adventure playship, ride-on toys and swings. A Metropark daily or annual vehicle permit is required for entry to the park. The park will eventually be linked to Dexter-Huron Metropark and Hudson Mills Metropark via the Border-to-Border Trail.

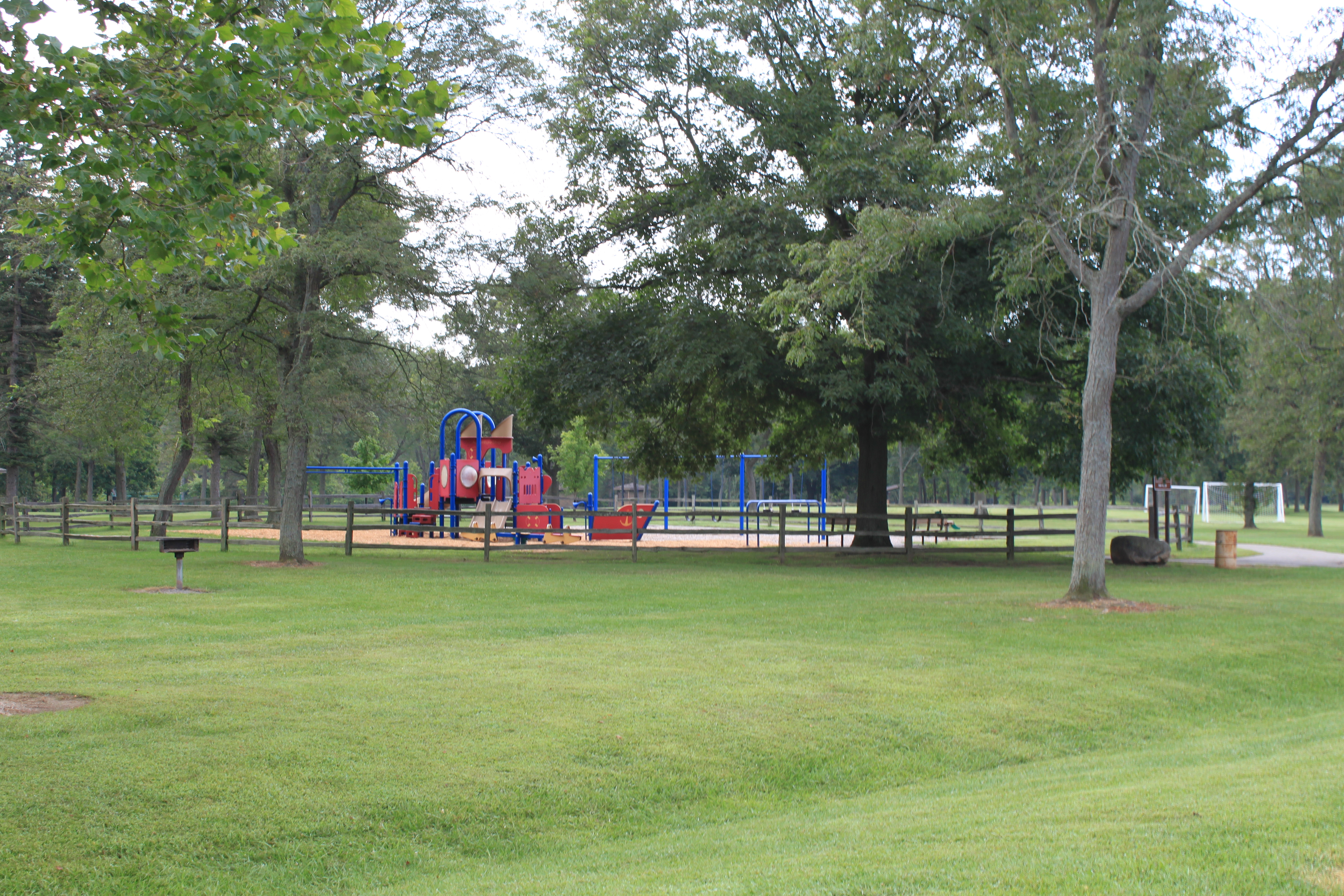
Children's play area

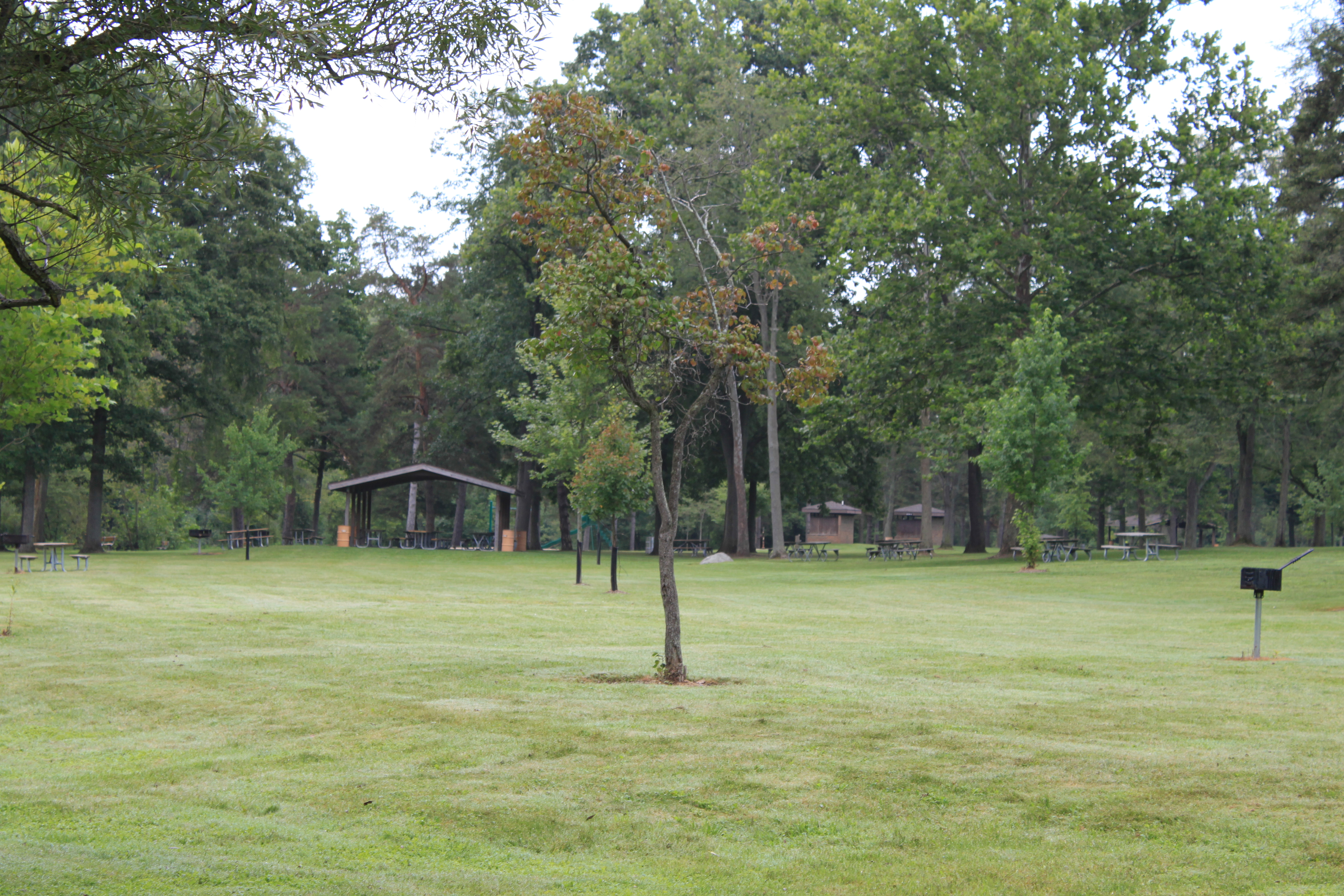
Picnic area

== History ==
In 1835, there was a sawmill located on the Huron River at this site. That year, Norman Gooddale purchased the mill for $50 and added a flour mill to the site. Jacob Doremus platted a village adjacent to the mill in 1836 named Michigan Village, although the name was changed to Delhi shortly afterward. In 1842, Gooddale acquired all of the unsold lots. His son Frank expanded the mill, shipping flour to New England and employing 20 people; in 1880, Delhi Mills shipped 41,000 barrels of flour on the Michigan Central Railroad. In 1883, Delhi had 2 flour mills, a woolen mill and a saw mill, taking power from a dam 150 feet long with a 7-foot head and producing 140 horsepower when all mills run at once.

Today's Delhi Rapids is the remains of the collapsed mill dam that once powered Delhi Mills.
