= StartOS =

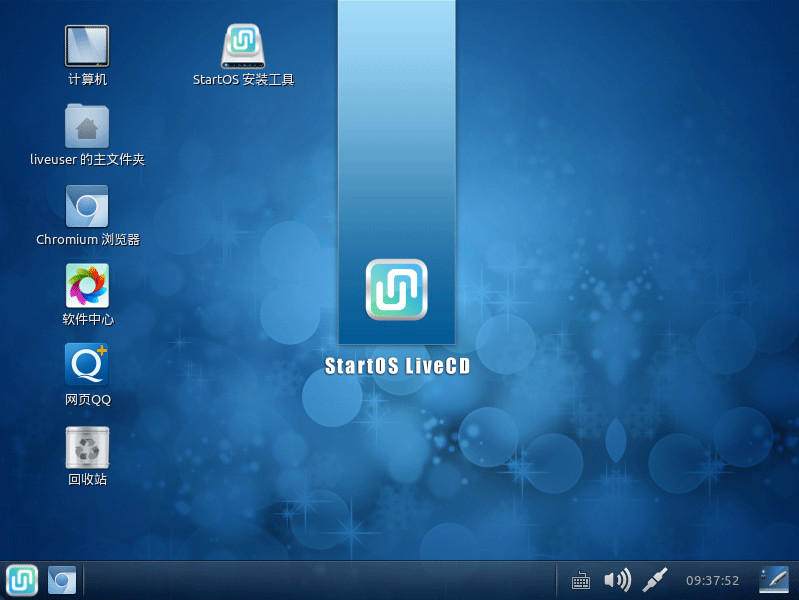
- StartOS 5.0
- Developer: YLMF
- OS family: Linux (Unix-like)
- Working state: Discontinued
- Source model: Open source
- Latest release: 6.0 (beta) / 4 July 2013; 13 years ago
- Latest preview: 6.0 beta / 27 March 2012; 14 years ago
- Available in: Chinese and English
- Package manager: Self-made YKPG
- Kernel type: Monolithic (Linux)
- Userland: GNU
- Default user interface: GNOME
- Official website: www.startos.org

StartOS (formerly Ylmf OS) is a discontinued Chinese Linux distribution.

StartOS is an operating system that is free and open-source software. In the beginning it was based on Ubuntu, but starting from version 4.0 it adopted a custom package management (called YPK) and system installer, though the underlying live medium is still built using Ubuntu's Casper tool. Its user interface closely resembles that of Microsoft Windows XP. The distribution was originally not available in the English language, though shortly after the initial release in late 2009 an English-language version of Ylmf OS was released.

Despite the very similar appearance to Windows XP's Luna theme—the default theme for Windows XP—Microsoft does not appear to be planning to take any sort of action against the operating system or its developers.

Ylmf OS 4.0 looks similar to Windows Vista, but also has a Mac OS X cursor scheme.

== Versions ==
- 1.0 (based on Ubuntu 9.10)
- 1.15 (based on Ubuntu 9.10)
- 1.5 (based on Ubuntu 9.10)
- 2.0 (based on Ubuntu 9.10)
- 3.0 (based on Ubuntu 10.04 LTS)
- 4.0 (based on Xiange Linux, not available on the English Web site, but can be installed in English)
- 5.0 (beta, now called "StartOS")
- 5.1 (2013, based on Ubuntu 12.04 LTS)
- 6.0 (2013, beta)

== Gallery ==
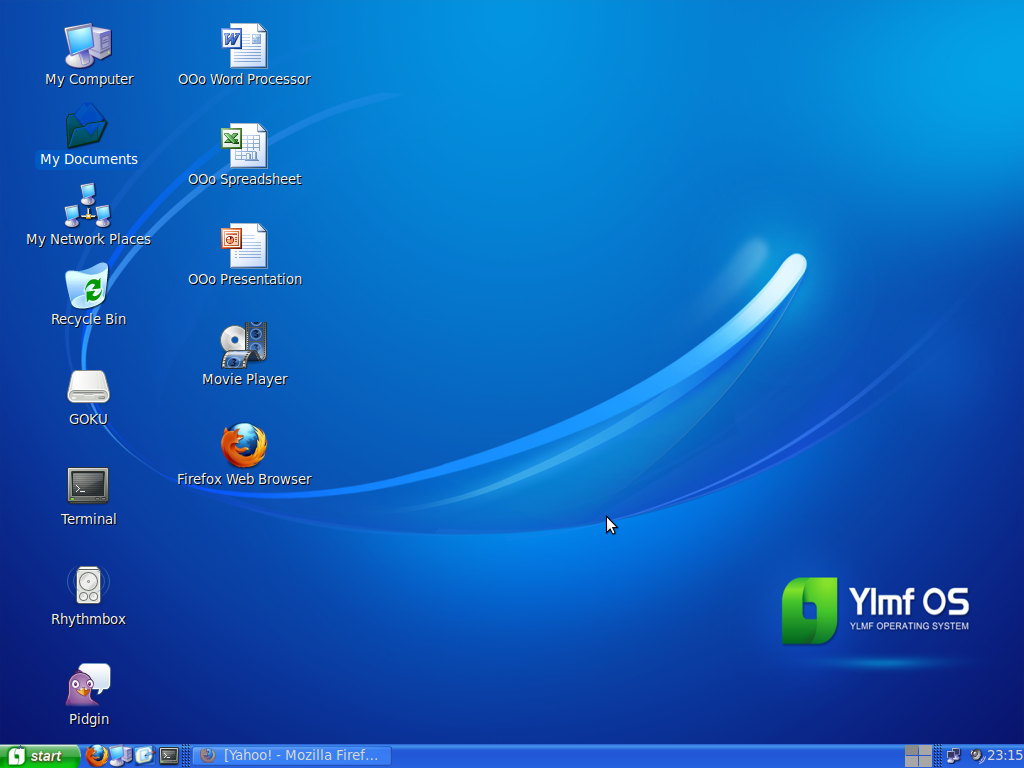
3.0

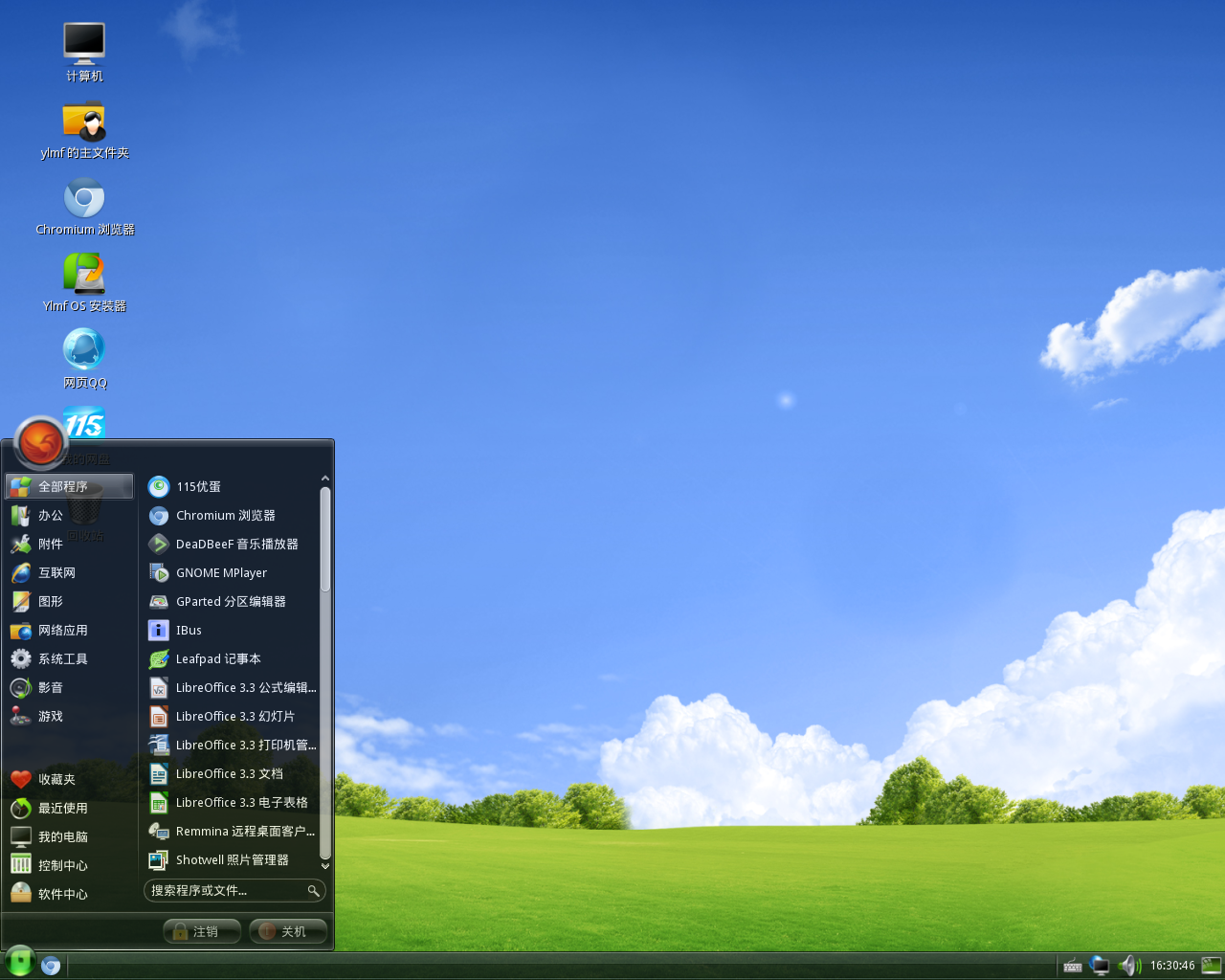
4.0

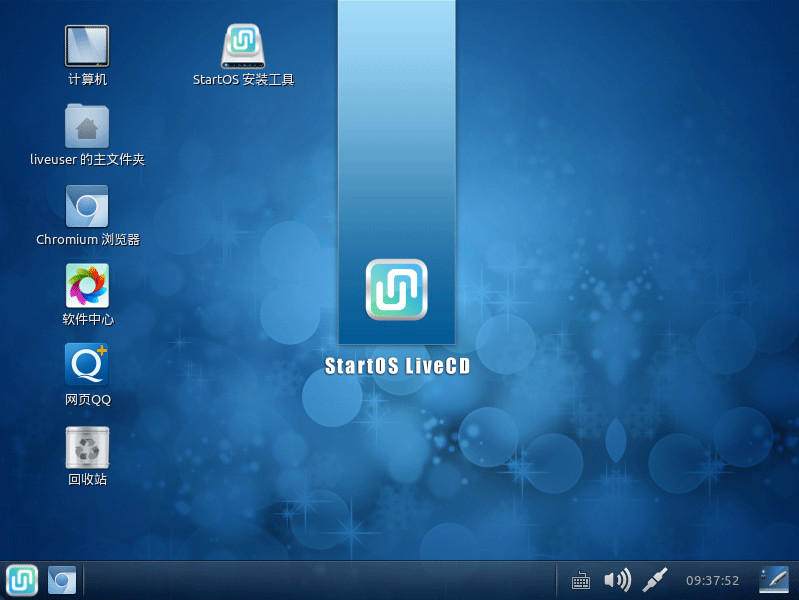
5.0

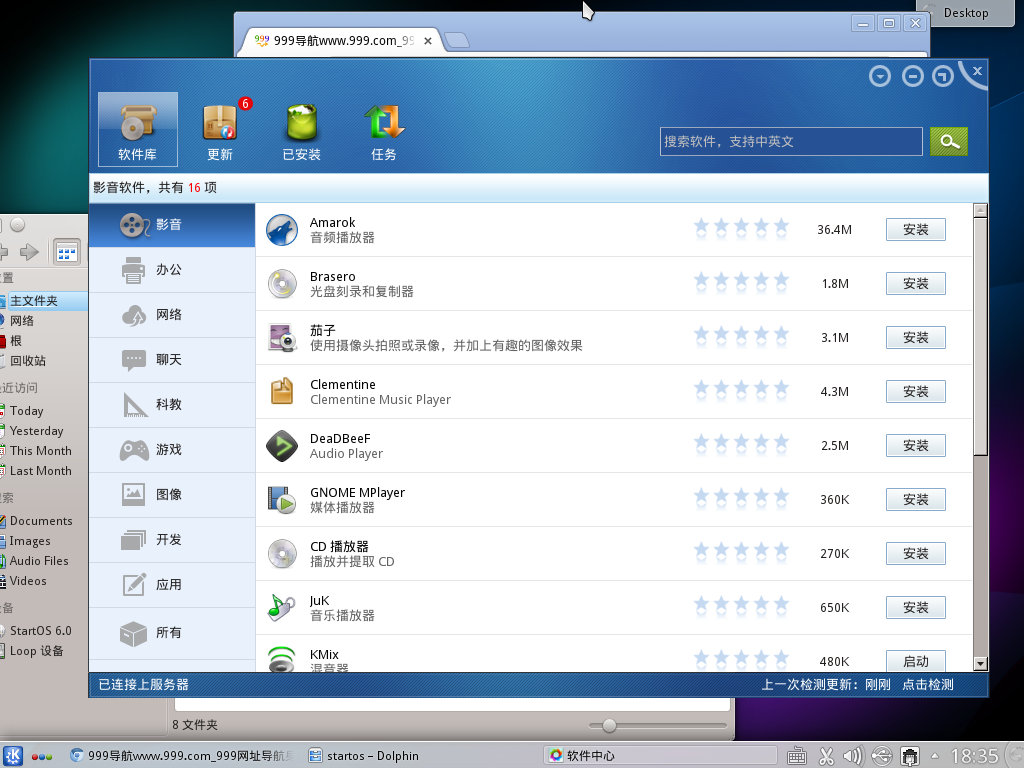
6.0beta KDE

== See also ==
- Linux Deepin
- Zorin OS
