= GDB Human Genome Database =

Human Genome

Content
- Data types captured: Genetic mapping data
- Organisms: Homo sapiens

Contact
- Research center: Howard Hughes Medical Institute; Johns Hopkins University School of Medicine
- Primary citation: PMID 2041809
- Release date: 1989

The GDB Human Genome Database was a community curated collection of human genomic data. It was a key database in the Human Genome Project and was in service from 1989 to 2008.

== History ==
In 1989 the Howard Hughes Medical Institute provided funding to establish a central repository for human genetic mapping data. This project ultimately resulted in the creation of the GDB Human Genome DataBase in September 1990. In order to ensure a high degree of quality, records within GDB were subjected to a curation process by human genetics specialists, including the HUGO Gene Nomenclature Committee.

Established under the leadership of Peter Pearson and Dick Lucier, GDB received financial support from the US Department of Energy and the National Institutes of Health. Located at the Johns Hopkins University School of Medicine, GDB became a source of high quality mapping data which were made available both online as well as through numerous printed publications. The project was supported internationally by the EU, Japan, and other countries.

The GDB had several directors in its time. Peter Pearson, David T. Kingsbury, Stantley Letovsky, Peter Li, and A. Jamie Cuticchia.

Funds from the US Department of Energy that were previously allocated for GDB were transferred in 1998 due to the shift in emphasis in the human genome project. However that same year, A. Jamie Cuticchia obtained funding from Canadian public and private sources to continue the operations of GDB. While the data curation continued to be performed at Johns Hopkins, GDB central operations were moved to The Hospital for Sick Children (HSC) in Toronto, Ontario, Canada. In November 2001, the HSC fired Cuticchia due to a dispute over the GDB website domain name.

In 2003 RTI International became the new host for GDB where it continued to be maintained as a public resource; GDB was closed in 2008 after control of the project reverted to Johns Hopkins.
