= Huron =

Huron may refer to:

== Native American ethnography ==
- Huron people, a term most commonly used to refer to the Wendat, Tionontati, or Wyandot peoples.
- Huron or Wyandot language, an Iroquoian language
- Nottawaseppi Huron Band of Potawatomi, or Huron Potawatomi, an Algonquian nation based in Calhoun County, Michigan
- Wendat Nation, or Huron-Wendat First Nation, or Nation Huronne-Wendat, a Wendat government based in Quebec

== Geographical features ==
- Huron Glacier, in Antarctica
- Huron Islands, on Lake Superior
- Huron Mountains, in the Upper Peninsula of Michigan
- Huron National Forest, in the Lower Peninsula of Michigan
- Huron Peak, in Colorado

=== Bodies of water ===
- Lake Huron, one of the North American Great Lakes
- Huron Swamp, in Michigan
- Huron Lake, in the parish municipality of Lac-aux-Sables, Mékinac Regional County Municipality, Quebec
- Huron Falls (disambiguation)
- Huron River (disambiguation)
- Rivière des Hurons (disambiguation)

== Places ==
- Huron County (disambiguation)

=== In Canada ===
- Lac-Huron, Quebec, an unorganized territory in the Rimouski-Neigette Regional County Municipality
- Huron-Kinloss, a township in Bruce County, Ontario
- Huron East, Ontario, a municipality in Huron County
- Huronia (region), Ontario, historic home of the Huron people until 1649
- Rural Municipality of Huron No. 223, in south-central Saskatchewan
- Huron Tract, or Huron Block, a large area of land in southwestern Ontario

==== Electoral districts in Canada ====
- Huron—Bruce (federal electoral district) (formerly known as Huron and Huron—Middlesex), a federal and provincial electoral district in Ontario
- Huron South, a historic federal electoral district in Ontario
- Huron North (federal electoral district), a historic federal electoral district in Ontario
- Huron East, a historic federal electoral district in Ontario
- Huron West, a historic federal electoral district in Ontario
- Huron Centre, a federal electoral district in Ontario

=== In the United States ===
- Huron, California, a city in Fresno County
- Huron, Indiana, an unincorporated community in Lawrence County
- Huron, Kansas, a city in Atchison County
- Huron, Missouri, an unincorporated community in Polk County
- Huron, Ohio, a city in Erie County
- Huron, New York, a town in Wayne County
- Huron (hamlet), New York, in Wayne County
- Huron, South Dakota, a city in Beadle County
- Huron, Tennessee, an unincorporated community in Henderson County
- Huron, Wisconsin, an unincorporated community in Chippewa County
- Hurontown, Michigan, an unincorporated community in Houghton County
- Huron Mountain, Michigan, a defunct summer post office
- Port Huron, Michigan, a city in St. Clair County
- Huron Township (disambiguation)

== Educational institutions ==
- Huron College (disambiguation)
- Huron High School (disambiguation)
- Huron University (disambiguation)

== Military ==
- Beechcraft C-12 Huron, a series of twin-engine turboprop aircraft
- HMCS Huron (G24), a World War II Tribal-class destroyer
- HMCS Huron (DDG 281), an Iroquois-class destroyer active from 1972 to 2005
- United States lightship Huron (LV-103), a lightvessel launched in 1920 and now a museum ship moored in Pine Grove Park
- USS Huron (1861), a gunboat acquired by the Union Navy during the American Civil War
- USS Huron (1875), an iron sloop-rigged screw steam gunboat
- USS Huron (CA-9), a US Navy armored cruiser

== Music ==
- Huron (Canadian band), a rock band active since 2008
- Huron (UK band), an English heavy metal band active since 2007
- Lord Huron, an American indie folk band based in Los Angeles
- Huron Carol, a traditional Canadian Christmas carol

== Other uses ==
- Huron Consulting Group, an international management consulting firm
- L'Ingénu (aka English: The Huron), a 1767 satirical novella by Voltaire
- "Hurón", either Galictis vittata or Galictis cuja, two related ferret-like mammals from Central and South America
- "Huron" AMD Sempron processor
- Huron Subdivision or Huron Sub, a railway line owned and operated by the Dakota, Minnesota and Eastern Railroad
- Port Huron Statement, the manifesto of the American student activist movement Students for a Democratic Society (SDS)

== See also ==
- Hurones, a municipality in the province of Burgos, Castile and León, Spain
- Port Huron (disambiguation)
- Wyandotte (disambiguation)
- Wyandot (disambiguation)
