= Huron River (disambiguation) =

The Huron River is a river in southeast Michigan that empties into Lake Erie.

Huron River may also refer to:

== Rivers ==
- Huron River (rivière du Chêne tributary), Chaudière-Appalaches, Quebec, Canada

=== United States ===
- Huron River (northern Michigan) or Big Huron River in the northern Upper Peninsula of Michigan that empties into Lake Superior
- Little Huron River in the northern Upper Peninsula of Michigan that empties into Lake Superior
- Huron River (Ohio) in north central Ohio that empties into Lake Erie

== Other uses ==
- Huron River platform (2011), the seventh-generation Centrino platform CPUs from Intel
- Huron River Area Credit Union, Michigan, USA

== See also ==
- Clinton River (Michigan), known as the Huron River until 1824
- Huron river chain of lakes, Michigan, USA
- Rivière des Hurons (disambiguation) (French: Huron River, lit. 'River of the Hurons')
- Huron (disambiguation)
