= Swift Creek =

Swift Creek may refer to:

== Places ==
- Swift Creek, Georgia, an unincorporated community in DeKalb County, Georgia, U.S.
- Swift Creek Township, Wake County, North Carolina

== Rivers ==
- Swift Creek (Western Australia), a watercourse in Western Australia
- Swift Creek (Manitoba)
- Swift Creek (Ocmulgee River) in Bibb County, Georgia, U.S.
- Swift Creek (Virginia)
- Swift Creek (Washington) in Washington state
- Swift Creek (Wyoming)

== Others ==
- Battle of Swift Creek (1864), a battle fought in Virginia during the American Civil War
- Swift Creek culture, an archaeological culture in North America
- Swift Creek Middle School, a school in Florida

== See also ==
- Swifts Creek, a town in Australia
- Swift Run, a creek in Michigan
