= Pontiac Lake (Michigan) =

- Location within the state of Michigan Pontiac Lake (the United States)
- Location: Oakland County, Michigan
- Coordinates: 42°39′51″N 83°27′40″W
- Type: manmade lake
- Basin countries: United States
- First flooded: 1926
- Surface area: 640 acres (260 ha)
- Max. depth: 34 ft (10 m)
- Surface elevation: 961 ft (293 m)
- Islands: several
- Settlements: White Lake Township and Waterford Township

Pontiac Lake is an all-sports, 640-acre (260 ha) Oakland County, Michigan lake along the Huron River. The lake lies primarily in White Lake Township, while a small portion of the lake lies in Waterford Township.

It is the fifth largest lake in the county.

Pontiac Lake is a public lake with a public boat launch.

The Pontiac Lake Recreation Area is located at the lake.

== History ==
Pontiac Lake is a man-made lake created in 1926 when Lime Lake, a small lake in the upper Huron River watershed, was dammed. It lies about 7 miles (11 km) west of Pontiac, Michigan.

Since 1999, Pontiac Lake has hosted "Quake on the Lake", an annual hydroplane boat race.

== Fish ==
Pontiac Lake fish include Carp, Catfish, Crappie, Largemouth Bass, Northern Pike, Smallmouth Bass, Sunfish, Bowfin, Walleye and Yellow Perch.
