= Waltz Road–Huron River Bridge =

- U.S. National Register of Historic Places
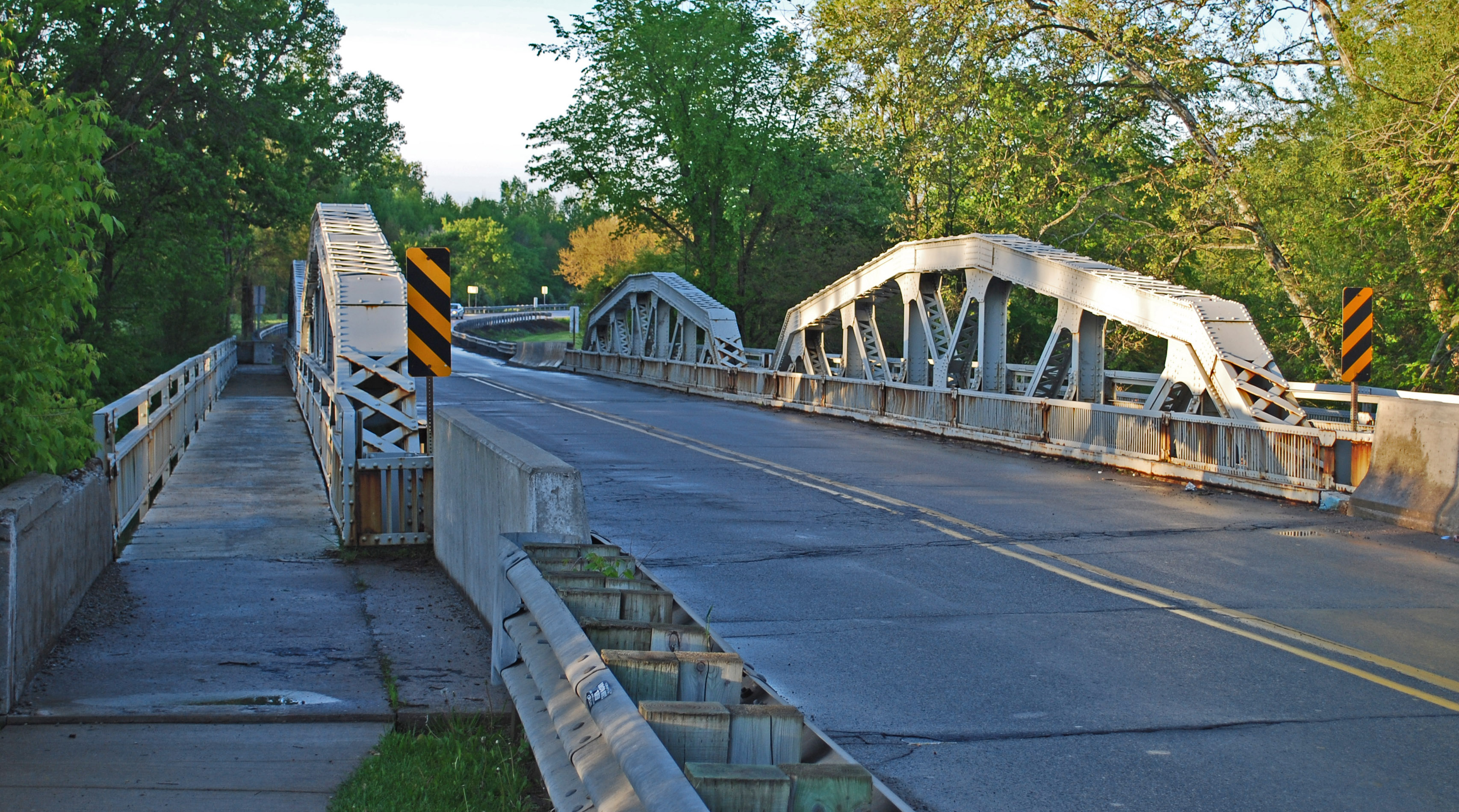
- Original bridge before replacement

- Location within Michigan Location within the United States
- Interactive map
- Location: Waltz Rd. over Huron R., Huron Township, Michigan
- Coordinates: 42°9′40″N 83°24′10″W
- Area: less than one acre
- Built: 1924
- Built by: Mount Vernon Bridge Company; Swingle & Robinson
- Architect: Wayne County Road Commission
- Architectural style: Camelback pony truss
- Demolished: 2017
- MPS: Highway Bridges of Michigan MPS
- NRHP reference No.: 00000081
- Added to NRHP: February 10, 2000

The Waltz Road–Huron River Bridge is an automobile bridge located on Waltz Road spanning the Huron River in Huron Township, Michigan. It was listed on the National Register of Historic Places in 2000, but demolished in 2017.

== History ==
The Waltz Road–Huron River Bridge was constructed in 1924 by the Wayne County Road Commission at a cost of $65,000. The bridge replaced a previous footbridge that had been erected over the Huron River to allow local children to attend school. The substructure was built by Swingle & Robinson, contractors from Wyandotte, Michigan, and the superstructure by the Mt. Vernon Bridge Company from Mt. Vernon, Ohio.

On June 1, 2017, the Roads Division at the Wayne County Department of Public Services closed the bridge for repairs. On August 23, 2017, the Department of Public Services released the news that the 93-year-old bridge would be replaced rather than repaired. Wayne County awarded the bridge reconstruction contract to Toebe Construction, LLC of Wixom.

The road reopened with a new bridge on June 3, 2019.

== Description ==
The entire bridge was 207 feet (63 m) long, with a span length of 100 feet (30 m) and a width of 27 feet (8.2 m). The span originally consisted of two identical seven-panel, camelback Pratt pony trusses. Sidewalks were attached to the outside of each truss; the railings were originally concrete balustrades with urn-shaped spindles. Solid concrete parapets lined the approaches at each end of the bridge.

== Images ==
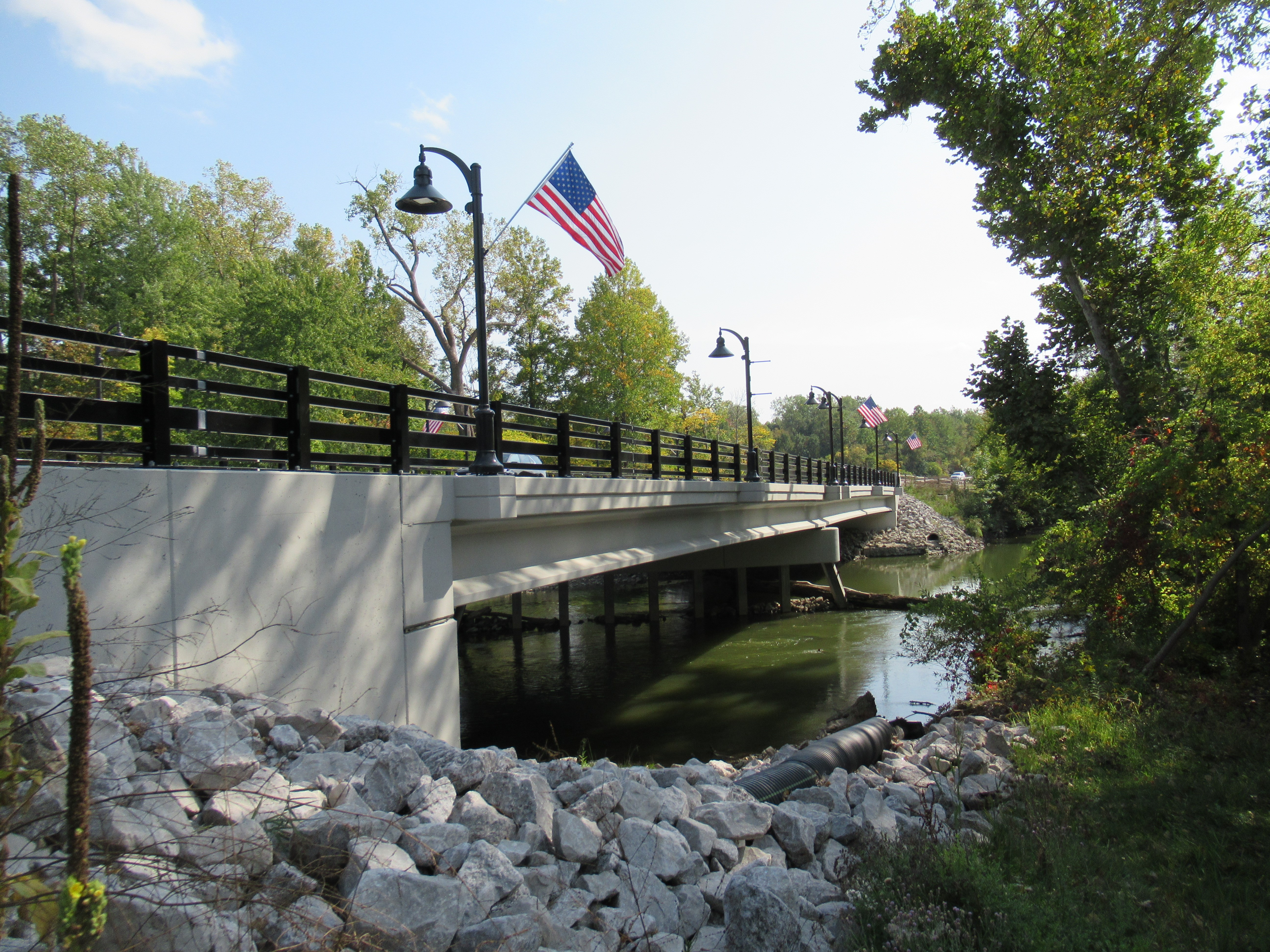
Recently reconstructed bridge in September 2020

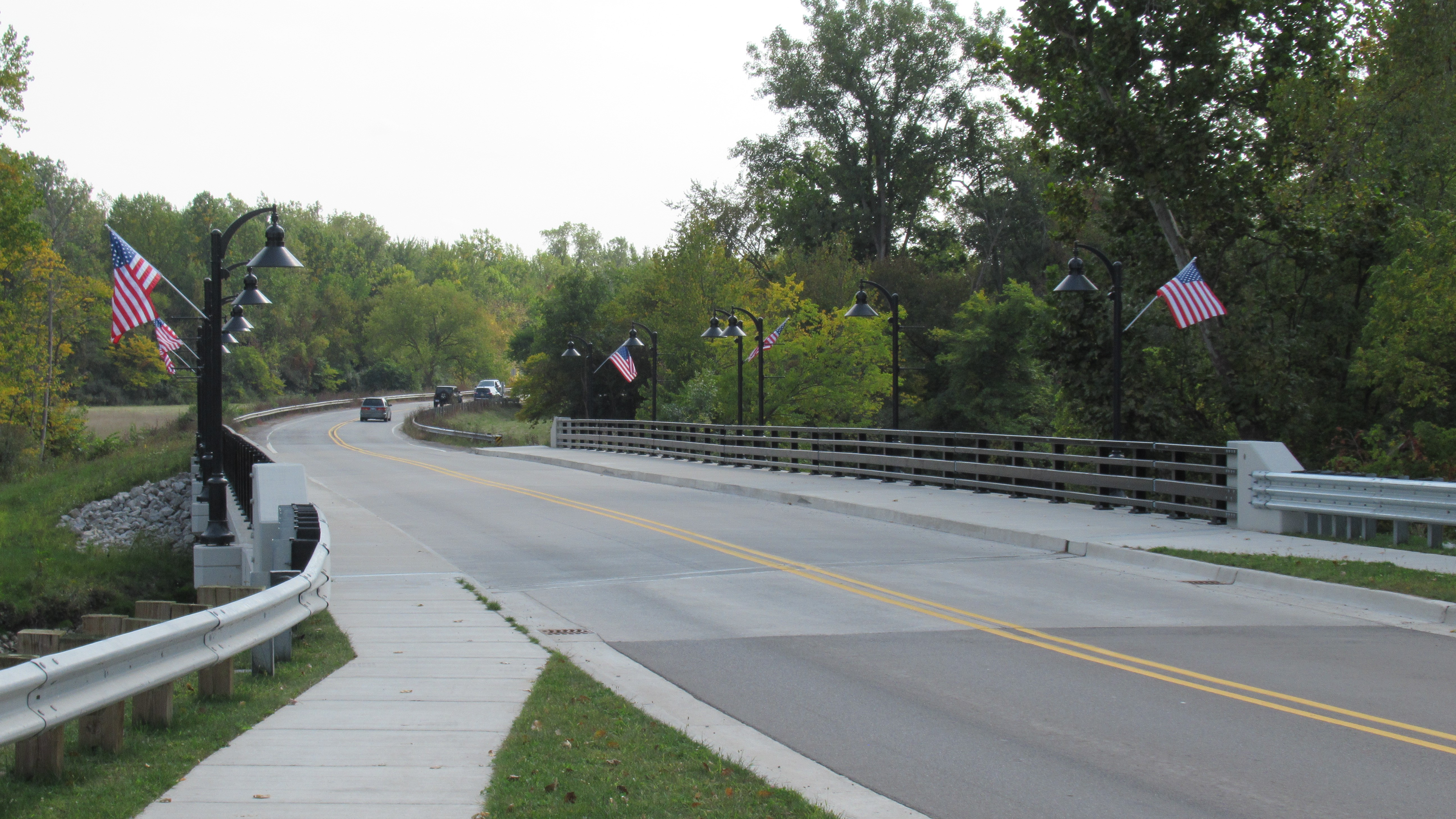
Roadway crossing the Huron River
