= Island Lake Recreation Area =

Protected area in Michigan, US

Island Lake State Recreation Area
- Location within Michigan Location within the United States
- Location: Lower Peninsula; Livingston County, Michigan; United States
- Nearest city: Brighton, Michigan
- Coordinates: 42.48638°N 83.730833°W
- Area: 4,000 acres (1,600 ha)
- Visitors: 1.09 million (in 2008)
- Governing body: Michigan Department of Natural Resources
- Website: Official website

Island Lake State Recreation Area is a state-run park in Green Oak Township, Livingston County, within the Metro Detroit area in Michigan. The 4,000-acre (1,600 ha) park lies on the Huron River and Kent Lake, an impoundment of the river, immediately downstream of Kensington Metropark with which it is connected by a bike trail. It is the third busiest park operated by the Michigan Department of Natural Resources with visitation of 1.09 million in 2008. The park lies near the intersection of I-96 and US-23. It has a group campsite and a canoe-in campsite, several miles of hiking and biking trails, a shooting range, swimming and several small lakes. It is the only Michigan park to have a hot air balloon launch area.
