= Cheyne Stoking (album) =

Studio album by Huron
- Released: 1 June 2009
- Genre: Thrash metal, groove metal, southern rock
- Label: Rising

Huron chronology
Cheyne Stoking (2009)	Mary Celeste (2011)

Professional ratings
Review scores
Source	Rating
Terrorizer	5/10 stars
Kerrang	4/5 stars
Rock Sound	8/10 stars

Cheyne Stoking is the debut studio album by English heavy metal band Huron.

== Track list ==
1. "Lust of War" – 3:18
2. "Killer from New York" – 4:04
3. "Snakes Down Her Back" – 4:12
4. "Pain Is Me" – 4:17
5. "Your View from the Sun" – 5:03
6. "Your Sins from Yesterday" – 3:43
7. "Break Your Neck" – 4:04
8. "Hell Can Wait" – 4:57
9. "Already Dead" – 4:56
10. "Bringer of Light" – 4:15
11. "Dirt" – 5:48
