= Kent Lake (Michigan) =

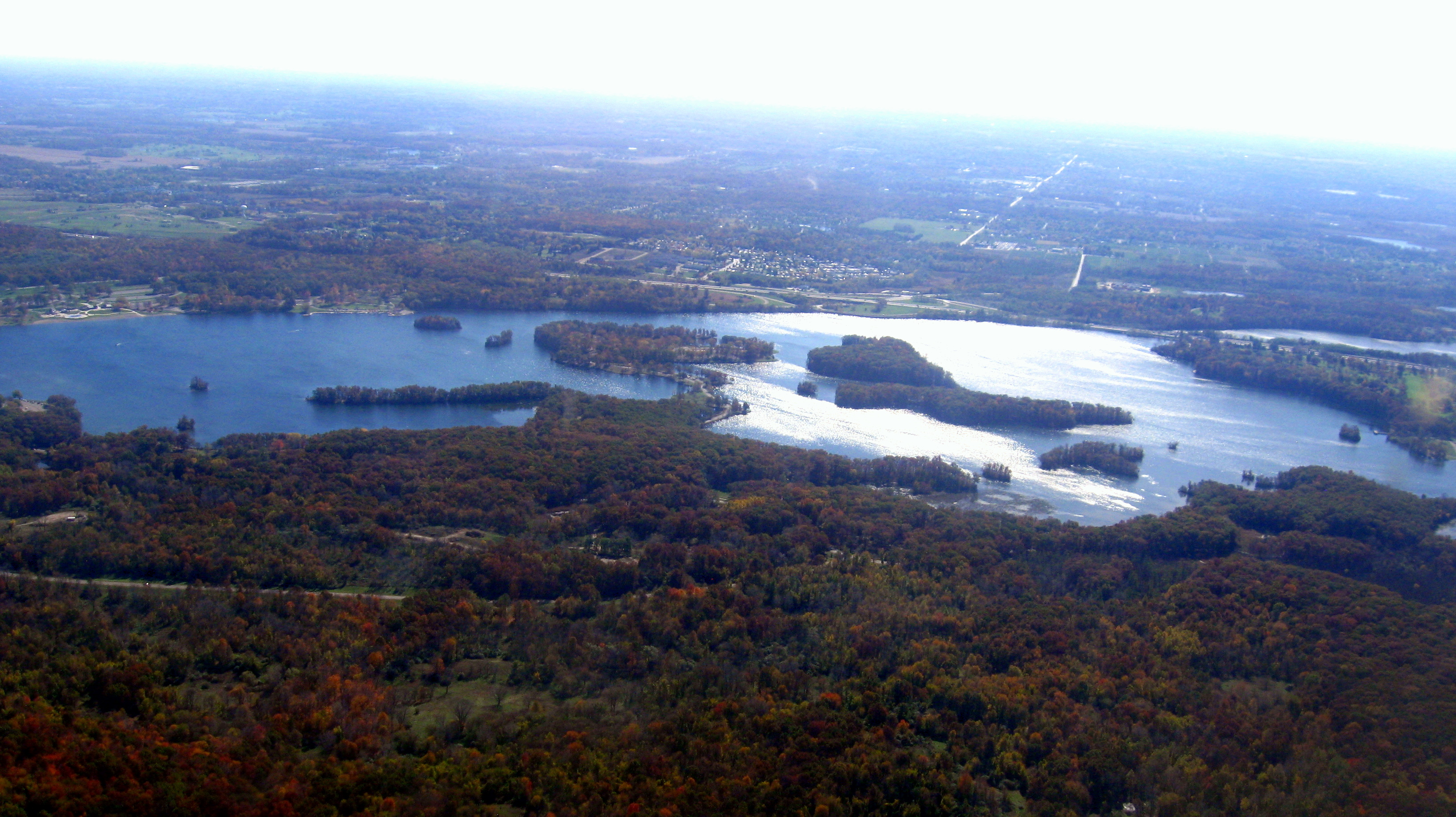

- Location within the state of Michigan Kent Lake (the United States)
- Location: Oakland and Livingston County, Michigan
- Coordinates: 42°31′11″N 83°39′09″W
- Type: reservoir
- Basin countries: United States
- Surface area: 1,200 acres (490 ha)
- Max. depth: 36 ft (11 m)
- Surface elevation: 879 ft (268 m)
- Settlements: Milford Township, Michigan

Kent Lake is a 1,200-acre (490 ha) reservoir lake formed by damming the Huron River near its headwaters. Kent Lake is mostly located in Oakland County, Michigan in Milford and Lyon Townships, with a small portion including its dam located in Green Oak Township, Livingston County, Michigan.

Conceived as a large recreational lake (it was a 70-acre (28 ha) natural lake prior to impoundment), Kent Lake was dammed in 1946 by the Huron-Clinton Metropolitan Authority. The current lake lies entirely within Kensington Metropark and Island Lake State Recreation Area. It has a maximum speed limit of 10 mph.

View of the walking path at southwest corner of Kensington Metropark

== Fish ==
Fish which may be found in Kent Lake include Bluegill, Channel Catfish, Largemouth Bass, Northern Pike, Smallmouth Bass, Walleye, Pumpkinseed, and Yellow Perch. Historically black crappie and bluegill were reported, but notable declines were reported in the 1990s.
