= Huron Falls =

Huron Falls can refer to several waterfalls in the United States:

- Lower Huron Falls, on the Huron River (northern Michigan)
- Huron Falls, one of 24 named waterfalls in Ricketts Glen State Park in Pennsylvania
