= Huron Swamp =

Forested wetland in Michigan, US

Coordinates: 42°42′40″N 83°29′44″W

The Huron Swamp is a heavily forested wetland located in Springfield Township, in Oakland County, Michigan, United States. It is nine miles (14 kilometers) northwest of the city of Pontiac. It is part of the local Indian Springs Metropark, which is then a component of the Huron-Clinton Metroparks system. Big Lake is to the northwest.

The Huron River originates within the Huron Swamp.
