= Peninsular Paper Dam =

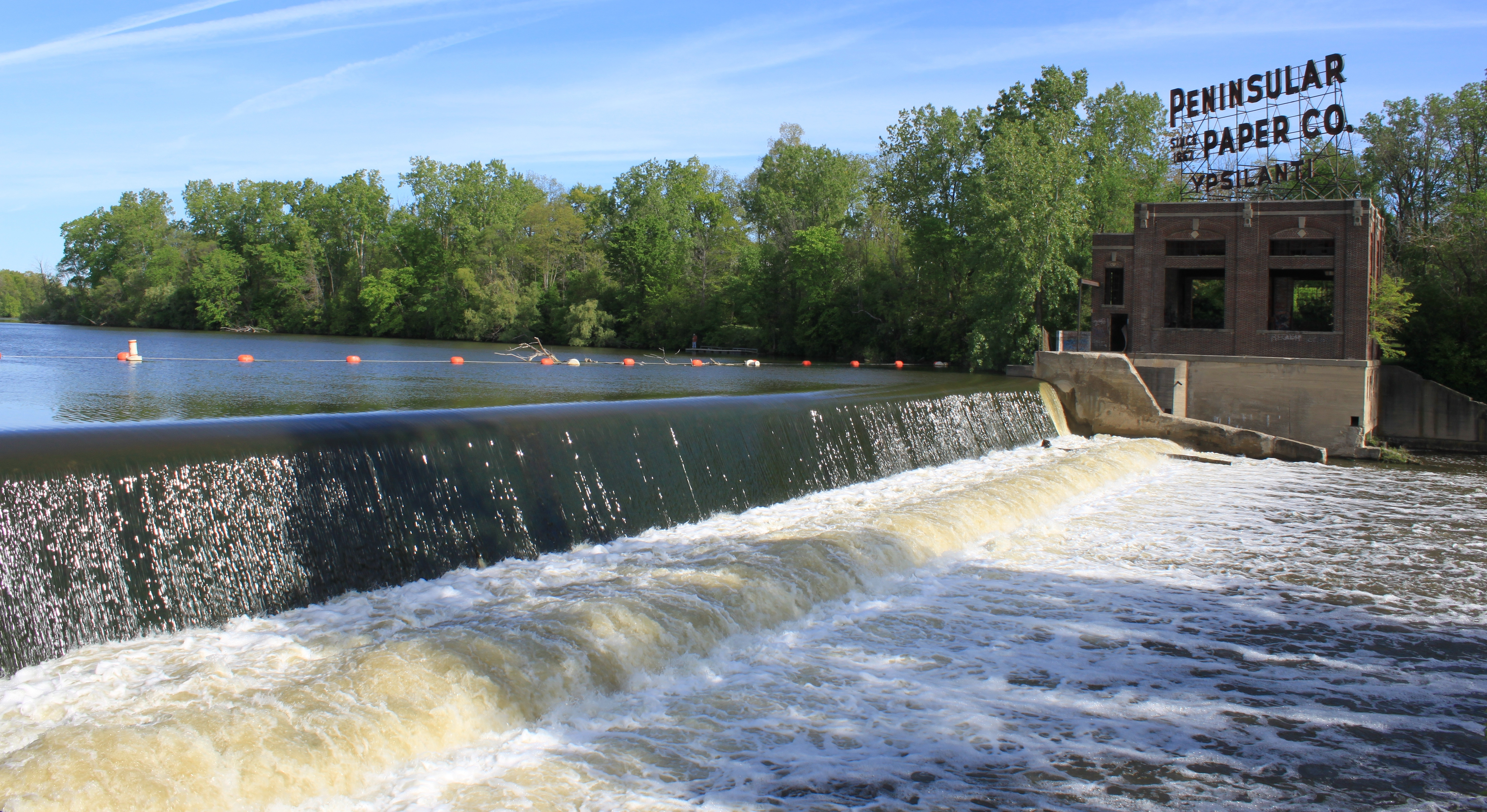
- The Peninsular Paper Dam (May 2010)

- Location within the state of Michigan
- Country: United States
- Location: 1249 Leforge Road; Ypsilanti, Michigan
- Coordinates: 42°15′22″N 83°37′27″W
- Purpose: Power
- Status: Decommissioned
- Opening date: 1914; 112 years ago
- Demolition date: Pending
- Built by: Peninsular Paper Company
- Owner: City of Ypsilanti

Dam and spillways
- Type of dam: Gravity dam
- Impounds: Huron River

The Peninsular Paper Dam is a decommissioned hydroelectric concrete gravity dam and former paper mill and power station crossing the Huron River. It is located in the city of Ypsilanti in Washtenaw County in the U.S. state of Michigan. The dam was constructed in 1867, and the resulting reservoir is an unnamed 177-acre (31.1 ha) pond along the river.

The Peninsular Paper Dam is 1.5 miles (2.4 km) downstream from the Superior Dam and 6.5 miles (10.4 km) upstream from the Ford Lake Dam. The dam is approximately 42.4 miles (68.2 km) from the river mouth at Lake Erie.

In May 2019, the Ypsilanti city council voted to completely remove the dam instead of continuing costly maintenance to repair the aging dam.

== History ==
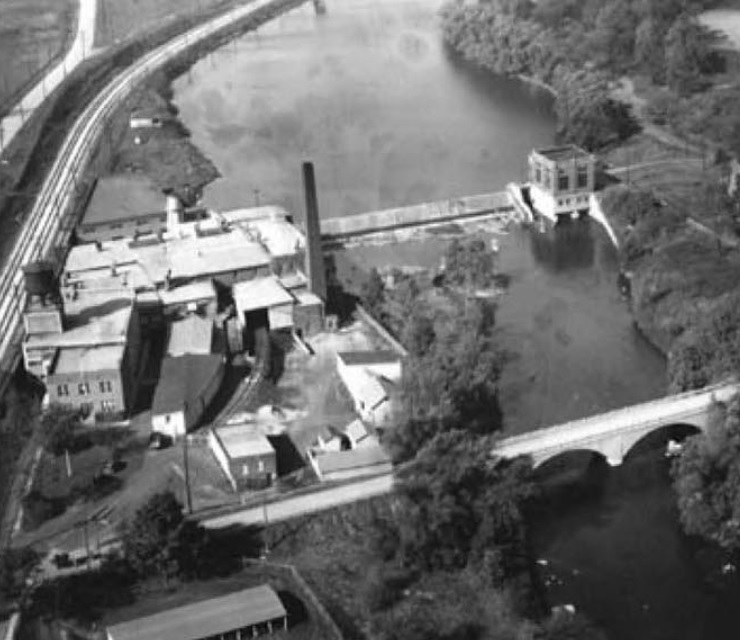
The Peninsular Paper Company, the dam, and power station in the early 1900s

The first dam was built on the site by the Peninsular Paper Company as early as 1867. At the same time, a large paper mill was constructed on the south side of the river, and a smaller one was built directly across the river in 1876. The smaller paper mill was heavily damaged by a fire in 1898. That mill was closed down, and the surviving equipment was moved to the larger facility. The original dam was replaced with the current dam in 1914. Heavy rain caused a dam failure on May 14, 1918 that caused considerable damage to some bridges further downstream, and the dam was completely repaired within two years. The larger facility remained in operation until 1970.

In 1986, the city of Ypsilanti acquired the land with intent to restore it or convert the facilities for other usage, but the projects never materialized before it was decided to demolish the remaining structures. The larger south-side paper mill was demolished in 2004 to make room for two residential apartment buildings called the Peninsular Place Apartments. The only remaining remnant of this paper mill is the original chimney that now stands in the courtyard of the apartment complex.

== Current status ==
The hollowed out exterior of the smaller north-side paper mill and signage remains standing. The surrounding area has been reorganized as Peninsular Park and is a popular destination for picnickers and shore fishermen. The dam is directly across North Huron River Drive from the main campus of Eastern Michigan University.

In September 2018, the city of Ypsilanti and the Huron River Watershed Council conducted a report to assess the feasibility of removing the Peninsular Dam and remaining structures. The report concluded that dam removal is feasible. The dam has a "high" hazard potential classification, which means a high degree of damage will result if the dam should fail in the future. The structural integrity of the dam is rated by the State of Michigan as poor. An early estimated cost of the repair of the dam exceeded $800,000, which included the removal of the historic building. Excluding the building, the cost of repair was $585,000, most of which could be funded by a grant from the Michigan Department of Environment, Great Lakes and Energy (EGLE). The report stated the possibility of maintaining the existing connected powerhouse structure and sign atop it, as the structure poses no hazard and is an iconic feature in the area. Hydroelectric generation is also once again being considered for the dam. The dam is capable of producing 11,500 kW-hrs per day.

== Proposed removal ==
A 2018 feasibility study, commissioned by the city and the Huron River Watershed Council, estimated the cost of removing the dam at $2.7 million. The study considered three major issues: the release of the sediment accumulated behind the dam, the impacts on infrastructure from removing the dam, and the effects on nearby landowners' property boundaries. All three issues were found to be manageable, with two bridges in the area requiring modifications to accommodate the changes in water flow. The study's estimate did not include costs for permits and engineering services, and a local advocacy group contended that the cost to remove the dam was higher, over $4 million.

On May 7, 2019, the Ypsilanti city council voted 5–1 to approve an initial $500,000 toward the removal of the dam. Further funding was provided by EGLE in 2023 and 2024, with grants of $3.7 million and $1.6 million respectively.

As of May 2024, the total estimated cost of removing the dam is $10 million, of which $7 million has been raised. Work on the removal project is projected to begin in late 2025, and be completed by the fall of 2026.
