= Mill Creek (Huron River tributary) =

- Mill Creek in Dexter

Location
- Country: United States
- State: Michigan
- County: Washtenaw

Physical characteristics
- Source: North Branch Mill Creek
  - location: Sharon Township, Michigan
- 2nd source: South Branch Mill Creek
  - location: Sylvan Township, Michigan
- Mouth: Huron River
  - location: Dexter, Michigan
  - coordinates: 42°20′34″N 83°53′04″W
- Basin size: 129 sq mi (330 km^{2})

Mill Creek is a tributary of the Huron River in Washtenaw County, Michigan. It forms from the confluence of its north and south branches, which flow through portions of western Washtenaw County. The main stem flows north through the city of Dexter, before meeting the Huron at Dexter–Huron Metropark. The 129-square-mile (330 km^{2}) drainage basin primarily consists of agricultural and residential land, with smaller patches of forestland. By the early 20th century, the prior old-growth forests of the watershed were cleared, while Mill Creek and its tributaries were heavily channelized for agricultural usage. Residential and agricultural runoff pose a water quality risk, especially after storms, and has resulted in algal blooms and elevated levels of phosphorus and E. coli bacteria. The most common fish in the watershed include sunfishes, johnny darters, mottled sculpins, and creek chubs, while brown trout have been stocked since the early 2010s.

== Course ==
Mill Creek forms from the confluence of its north and south branches southwest of Dexter, Michigan. South Branch Mill Creek emerges in the Sharon Short Hills of Sharon Township, Michigan. It flows generally northeast through Sharon Township, entering a small reservoir, Mill Pond, created by the Baker Dam, before continuing east, as it takes in several small tributaries from the south. The North Branch originates from sandy hills in Waterloo State Recreation Area and flows east, drawing water from Waterloo and the nearby Pinckney State Recreation Area. Running north of Chelsea, Michigan, it takes in Letts Creek and turns southeast towards its confluence with the South Branch. The main stem flows north through Dexter, emptying into the west bank of the Huron River near Dexter–Huron Metropark. The Huron River continues through Southeast Michigan, emptying into Lake Erie south of the city of Flat Rock.

== Hydrology ==
The Mill Creek drainage basin is about 129 square miles (330 km^{2}), (Note: A 2014 report by the Huron River Watershed Council instead gives this area as 143 square miles (370 km^{2}).) covering portions of Washentaw County, Michigan, and about 1 square mile (2.6 km^{2}) of the eastern edge of Jackson County, Michigan. About 47% of the drainage basin is used for agriculture, with 18% in residential and urban areas, and 10% is occupied by forests. Only 4% of the watershed area is covered by impervious surfaces, boosting the levels of groundwater recharge, with 31% consisting of natural areas such as wetlands, forests, and grasslands. However, most streams in the watershed have been straightened and channelized, resulting in lower water quality than expected. Along with nearby Portage Creek, Mill Creek is one of the largest tributaries of the Huron River, which otherwise has many small tributaries across the upper and lower portions of its watershed.

No dams are present on the main branch of Mill Creek, although four are present on its branches and tributary streams: the Baker Dam on the upper course of its south branch; the Sutton Lake Dam and Lower Sutton Dam in Lima Township, which create the 65-acre (26 ha) Sutton Lake for recreational purposes; and the Dexter Business & Research Detention Dam in Dexter, which creates a 2-acre (0.81 ha) detention basin.

Elevated phosphorus levels, generally from residential and agricultural runoff, poses a persistent impediment to the creek's water quality. As of 2014, the flow-weighted mean phosphorus level of 97 micrograms per liter, almost twice the target level for healthy stream conditions, with higher levels generally following heavy storms. These elevated levels can result in algal blooms. High levels of the fecal E. coli bacteria are present in the creek, especially upstream of Dexter, where as of 2014, the river is unsafe for drinking or recreational activities. Septic tank leakage and waste from pets, livestock, and waterfowl are among the primary sources of E. coli in the watershed. Agricultural runoff following storms can further elevate E. coli levels.

Mill Creek's bankfull discharge (the maximum flow the stream can sustain before overflowing its banks) is 496 cubic feet (14.0 m^{3}) per second, while its highest recorded flow was 964 cubic feet (27.3 m^{3}). The Mill Creek watershed is estimated to produce 5373 tons of sediment per year in erosion. A 2022 survey found erosion and downcutting to be particularly prevalent in three stretches of creek channel within the southern branch of the watershed. Agricultural channelization and drain tiling further upstream accelerated the erosion of these segments. The stream has moderate flashiness (the rate stream flow rises and falls during storms), slightly above average for streams in Michigan, but lower than average across the whole Midwest.

== Biology ==
Historically, northern pike were plentiful in the creek, but a reduction of large wetland areas has reduced their numbers. The most common fish in the watershed include sunfishes, johnny darters, mottled sculpins, and creek chubs. In the early 2010s, colder portions of the creek were stocked with brown trout. The stream is relatively warm, although enough cold springs are present in the watershed to make it marginally suitable for brown trout. Bolstered by local demand for coldwater fishing, trout persist in the watershed due to continued stocking, with an unknown amount of natural reproduction. Aquatic insect habitat in the creek is adequate, with large amounts of sand filling some areas which insects could otherwise use as shelter.

== Human history ==
Southeastern Michigan was traditionally occupied by the Wendat people, referred to by European colonists as the Huron. Much of the Mill Creek watershed was covered by old-growth forest prior to Euro-American settlement, with patches of grassland and wet prairie. French explorers reached the area in the early 1600s. Dexter was settled in 1825, while settlement in Sharon Township began in 1830. The Baker Dam, impounding the upper course of the main stem, was created in 1826 to serve a watermill.

Following colonization, the area was converted to agricultural usages, with settlers clearing forests and draining wetlands. By 1938, almost the entirety of the watershed was channelized, with industrialization and further dam construction following in the mid-20th century. The Mill Pond Dam, a gravity dam on the lower course of the Mill Creek mainstem near Dexter, was built in 1932 and initially served as a hydroelectric power station. Hydroelectric activity eventually ceased, and the impoundment was used as a recreational pond. In the late 20th century, agricultural usage declined as residential areas spread into the watershed. By 1989, the water of Mill Pond Dam impoundment had developed heavy siltation and large sediment deposits, leading to the dam's removal in 2008 over water quality concerns. This created a stretch of whitewater rapids at the former pond site. The remaining dams on the Mill Creek tributaries do not pose significant water quality concerns.

== Notes ==
=== Works cited ===
- Hay-Chmielewski, E. M.; Seelbach, Paul W.; Whelan, Gary E.; Jester, Douglas B., Jr. (1995). Huron River Assessment (PDF) (Report). Michigan Department of Natural Resources.
- Holmes, Thomas; Carpenter, Horace; Ives, Samuel G., eds. (1881). History of Washtenaw County, Michigan. Chas. C. Chapman & Co.
- Huron River Watershed Council (2014). Mill Creekshed Report (PDF) (Report).
- Huron River Watershed Council (2020). The Huron River Watershed: The Watersheds and Creeksheds (Map) (PDF) (Report).
- Mill Creek Subwatershed Stakeholder Advisory Group (2006). Mill Creek Subwatershed Management Plan (PDF) (Report). Huron River Watershed Council.
- Rosentreter, Roger L. (2014). Michigan: A History of Explorers, Entrepreneurs, and Everyday People. University of Michigan Press. ISBN 9780472071906.
- Steen, Paul; Lawson, Ric (2022). The Middle Huron River Management Plan, Section 1 (PDF) (Report). Huron River Watershed Council.
  - Appendix G: Summary of Geomorphology Assessment Results for the Middle Huron River Watershed, Section 1.
