= Traver Creek =

- Traver Creek in Ann Arbor

Location
- Country: United States
- State: Michigan
- County: Washtenaw

Physical characteristics
- Mouth: Huron River
  - location: Ann Arbor, Michigan
  - coordinates: 42°17′20″N 83°43′54″W
- Length: 4.5 mi (7.2 km)
- Basin size: 6.8 sq mi (18 km^{2})

Traver Creek is a small tributary of the Huron River in Washtenaw County, Michigan. Running 4.5 miles (7.2 km) through Ann Arbor Township and the City of Ann Arbor, the stream flows southeast through agricultural areas, taking in a 1.8-mile (2.9 km) tributary from the east. It turns south through the Leslie Park Golf Course before entering urban areas of Ann Arbor and draining into the Huron in the Lowertown neighborhood. High summer temperatures, highly variable flow, and the eight dams located across the watershed likely result in a poor or non-existent fish population. Aquatic insects are similarly rare in the downstream portions, although are more plentiful upstream. E. coli bacteria levels are consistently high, rendering the creek water unsafe for drinking or recreational activities. The creek is named for Absalom Traver, an early settler.

== Hydrology ==
Traver Creek runs through the Leslie Park Golf Course in Ann Arbor.

Traver Creek is a tributary of the Huron River in Washtenaw County, Michigan, with its main stem measuring about 4.5 miles (7.2 km) in length. It emerges from the western ridge of the Fort Wayne Moraine and flows southeast through Ann Arbor Township, passing under U.S. Route 23 and M-14. It turns south, taking in a 1.8-mile (2.9 km) tributary stream from the east before passing through the Leslie Park Golf Course and entering the northern portion of the City of Ann Arbor. After running southeast through urban portions of the city, it turns east and drains into the Huron River in the Lowertown neighborhood.

The Traver Creek drainage basin encompasses 6.83 square miles (17.7 km^{2}), spread across Ann Arbor and Ann Arbor Township, alongside small portions of Northfield Township at its northern edge. It is much steeper than other creeks in the Huron River watershed, descending about 36 feet per mile (6.8 m/km), for a total of 163 feet (50 m) across its course. Although the creek has a lower flashiness (the rate stream flow rises and falls during storms) than nearby Huron tributaries, it is still quite high in comparison to similar streams across Michigan and the broader Midwest. Following a 2-year-storm (the storm with the most precipitation expected in an average 2 year period), Traver Creek is estimated to have a stream flow of 313 cubic feet (8.9 m^{3}) per second, while an unmodified natural stream of the same basin area would be expected to reach only 67 cubic feet (1.9 m^{3}) per second.

Cool groundwater and warmer surface runoff flow into the creek. In the upper portions, shaded riparian zones lower water temperatures. However, water temperatures can rise significantly downstream of the unshaded golf course: during July and August, temperatures range from 65 to 80 °F (18 to 27 °C) in the upper creek, while downstream areas range between 70 to 85 °F (21 to 29 °C). These warmer areas can create conditions unsuitable for fish and macroinvertebrates. Erosion is high in the watershed, which generates about 1,057 tons of eroded sediment annually. The areas of highest erosion are within the Leslie Park Golf Course and the Foxfire South Park. Eight dams are located within the watershed, including four on the main stem branch.

== Environment ==
The Traver Creek watershed is covered primarily by urban and agricultural areas—about 40% and 38% of the watershed respectively. Natural areas encompass 15% of the watershed, with forests occupying about 8% of the watershed and wetlands about 5%. A third of these environments are within protected areas such as Black Pond and the Dhu Varren Woods. About 14% of the watershed is occupied by impervious surfaces. Levels above 10 to 12% are known to reduce biological diversity, as natural areas absorb runoff and allow for consistent stream flows.

Phosphorus levels are elevated across Traver Creek, potentially contributing to algal blooms and water quality issues. Nitrate and nitrite are low, although nitrate quantities (possibly from fertilizer or animal waste) rose slightly between 2006 and 2019. Surveys in the 2010s have shown both the dissolved oxygen and pH levels to be nominal.

As of 2015, no fish surveys have been conducted on Traver Creek. However, the dams, elevated temperatures, and flashiness likely limits fish occupancy; a 2015 analysis described the fish community as "poor to non-existent". The portion of the creek downstream from the golf course shows very limited diversity of aquatic insects, although greater diversity and more sensitive insect families can be found in the upstream portions. Levels of E. coli bacteria are consistently high in the creek, a sign of fecal contamination from sources such as pets and wildlife. This renders drinking and recreational activities in the water unsafe. E. coli levels increase further following storms.

== Human history ==
Prior to the Euro-American colonization of the Ann Arbor area in the 1820s, the Traver Creek basin was covered by oak–hickory forests. The creek was named for Absalom Traver, an early settler of the area. Six dams were constructed in the Traver Creek watershed during the 19th century, including three on the main stem and three on the south branch tributary. During the 1920s, water from the creek was collected into ice ponds and harvested during winters. With the rise of artificial refrigeration, two former ice houses near the stream were abandoned by 1940. A contemporary newspaper account described the creek as "purely decorative" beyond "furnishing a few minnows for the bait-cans of fishermen". Two additional dams were built on the creek during the mid-20th century: the Traver Lake Dam on a tributary in 1971, Traver Creek Retention Dam on the mainstem in 1981.

In 2013, the City of Ann Arbor and the Washtenaw County Water Resources Commissioner's Office took streambank stabilization efforts across a 2,000 feet (610 m) stretch of the creek within the Leslie Park Golf Course. The project created a two-level riparian buffer (a stretch of vegetation surrounding the stream), with a terrace level seeded by deep-rooted vegetation to contain the flow during floods. About 6.5 acres (2.6 ha) of additional wetland habitat was created during the process.
