= Ford Lake Dam =

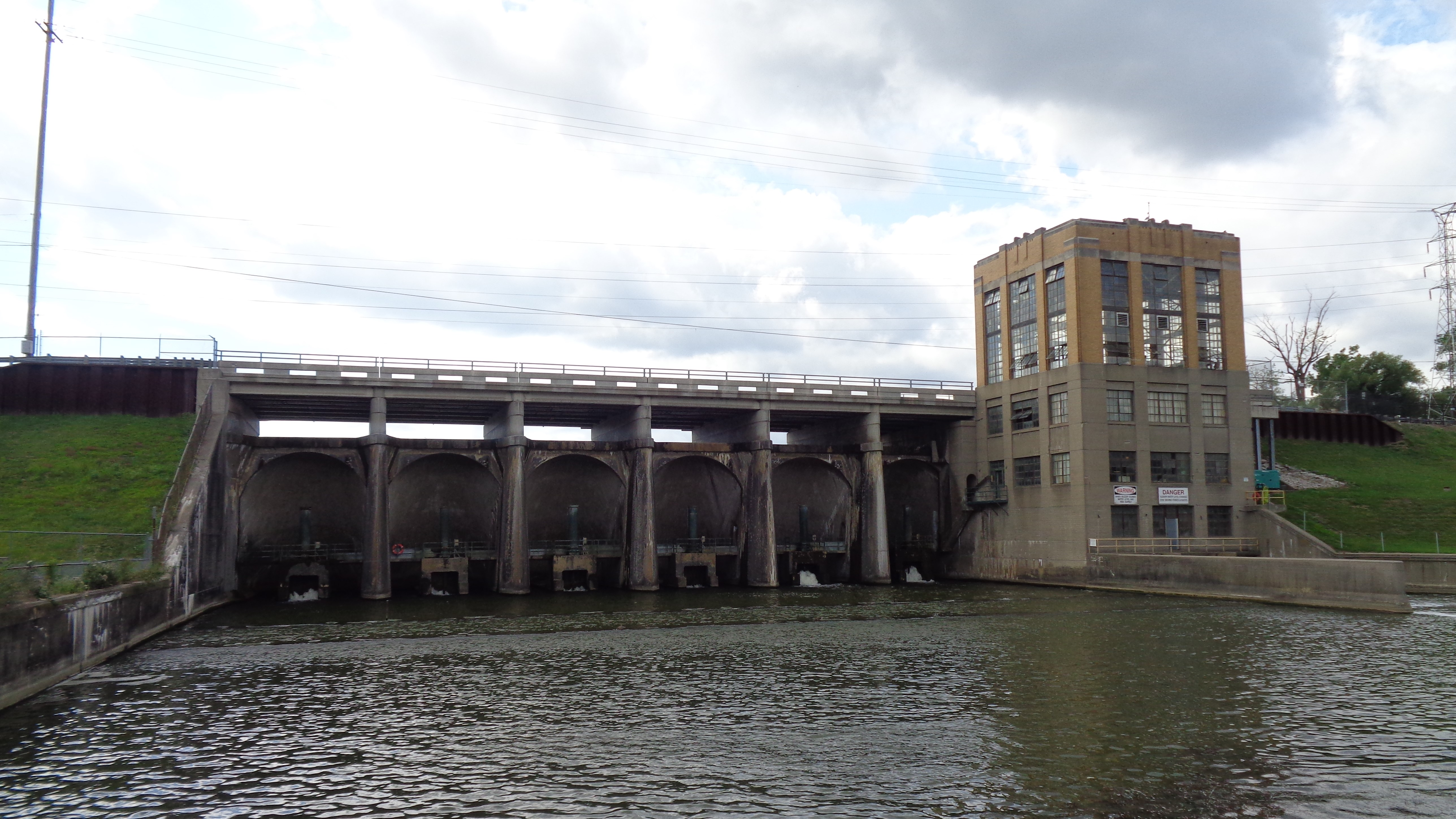
- Ford Lake Dam in September 2019

- Location within the state of Michigan
- Country: United States
- Location: 2635 Bridge Road; Ypsilanti Charter Township, Washtenaw County, Michigan
- Coordinates: 42°12′22″N 83°33′28″W
- Purpose: Power
- Status: Operational
- Opening date: 1932; 94 years ago
- Owner: Ypsilanti Charter Township

Dam and spillways
- Type of dam: Gravity dam
- Impounds: Huron River
- Length: 175 feet (53 m)
- Width (crest): 670 feet (200 m)

Reservoir
- Creates: Ford Lake
- Total capacity: 975 acres (395 ha)

The Ford Lake Dam (originally known as the Rawsonville Dam and sometimes referred to as the Hydro Dam) is an earthen, multi-arch hydroelectric gravity dam and powerhouse crossing the Huron River in Ypsilanti Charter Township in Washtenaw County in the U.S. state of Michigan. The dam was constructed in 1931–1932 and created the Ford Lake reservoir at 975 acres (395 ha).

The Ford Lake Dam is 6.5 miles (10.5 km) downstream from the Peninsular Paper Dam and 7.9 miles (12.7 km) upstream from the French Landing Dam and Powerhouse. The dam is approximately 36 miles (58 km) from the Huron River's mouth at Lake Erie.

The dam and powerhouse were commissioned by Henry Ford in order to supply electricity to the nearby Ypsilanti Ford Motor Plant. In 1969, the dam and surrounding land area were given to the city of Ypsilanti and surrounding township. The township took full ownership in 1990 and maintains control of the facility. The dam has a maximum spillway capacity of 28,000 cubic feet per second (793 m^{3}/s). The south embankment of the dam contains an emergency fuse plug spillway. The area surrounding the dam's output is organized into two parks operated by the township. The North Hydro Park is part of the Border-to-Border Trail. Along with the adjacent, undeveloped South Hydro Park, the area is popular for shore fishermen and canoeing/kayaking along the Huron River to Belleville Lake.
