= Rivière des Hurons =

Rivière des Hurons (French: Huron River, lit. 'River of the Hurons') may refer to:

- Rivière des Hurons (Richelieu River tributary), in Saint-Mathias-sur-Richelieu, Montérégie, Quebec, Canada
- Rivière des Hurons (Saint-Charles Lake), a river in Stoneham-et-Tewkesbury, La Jacques-Cartier Regional County Municipality, Capitale-Nationale, Quebec, Canada

== See also ==
- Huron River (rivière du Chêne tributary) (French: Rivière Huron), Chaudière-Appalaches, Quebec, Canada
- Huron River (disambiguation)
- Huron (disambiguation)
