= Huron High School =

Huron High School may refer to:

- Huron High School (Ann Arbor, Michigan), USA
- Huron High School (New Boston, Michigan), USA
- Huron High School (Ohio), Huron, Ohio, USA
- Huron High School (South Dakota), Huron, South Dakota, USA

== See also ==
- Huron Institute, a defunct high school in Milan, Ohio, USA
