= Huron Township =

Huron Township may refer to:

- Huron Township, Des Moines County, Iowa
- Huron Township, now Clinton Township, Macomb County, Michigan
- Huron Township, Michigan, in Huron County
- Huron Charter Township, Michigan, in Wayne County
- Huron Township, Cavalier County, North Dakota, in Cavalier County, North Dakota
- Huron Township, Erie County, Ohio
- Huron Township, Pennington County, South Dakota, in Pennington County, South Dakota
