= Swift Creek, Georgia =

Swift Creek
- Unincorporated community
- Location within Georgia Location within the continental United States
- Coordinates: 33°45′08″N 84°07′20″W
- Country: United States
- State: Georgia
- County: DeKalb
- Elevation: 892 ft (272 m)
- Time zone: UTC−5 (EST)
  - Summer (DST): UTC−4 (EDT)

Swift Creek is an unincorporated community in DeKalb County, Georgia, in the United States. It is located north of Lithonia and south of Stone Mountain.
