= Huron College =

Huron College may refer to:

- Huron University College, in London, Ontario, known as "Huron College" (1863–2000)
- Huron University (1883–2005) in Huron, South Dakota, known as "Huron College" (1897–1989)

== See also ==
- Huron University (disambiguation)
