= Big Huron River =

River on the Upper Peninsula of Michigan, United States

Huron River
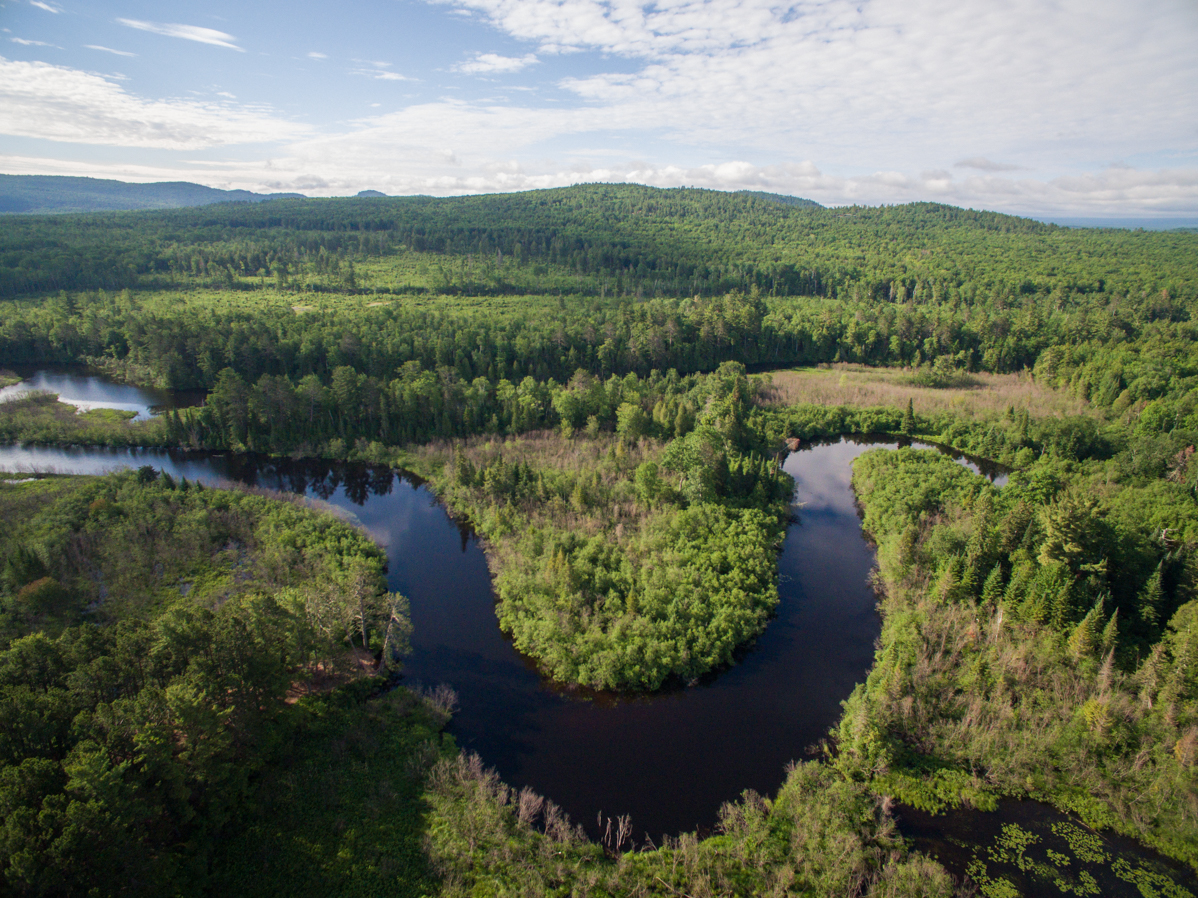
- Facing southeast over the Huron River, with the Huron Mountains in the background.

- Location within the state of Michigan

Location
- Country: United States
- State: Michigan
- District: Baraga County

Physical characteristics
- Mouth: Lake Superior
  - location: near Skanee, Michigan, Baraga County, Michigan, United States
  - coordinates: 46°54′35″N 88°2′12″W
  - elevation: 604 ft (184 m)

Basin features
- Tributaries
  - left: Black Creek, Huron River Little West Branch
  - right: Huron River East Branch, Robarge Creek, Huron River Little East Branch

The Big Huron River is a 7.6-mile-long (12.2 km) river in the northern Upper Peninsula of Michigan in the United States. Also known as the Huron River, it is named to differentiate from the Little Huron River. Another much larger Huron River is in Southeast Michigan.

The east and west branches of the Big Huron rise in L'Anse Township in eastern Baraga County, southeast of Mount Arvon, near the boundary with Marquette County. The East Branch runs through a corner of Marquette County before flowing back into Baraga County. The east and west branches merge in Arvon Township shortly before flowing into Lake Superior a few miles east of Huron Bay.

The Huron River is almost completely unmodified and undeveloped by humans. It flows almost entirely through woodlands and includes a number low waterfalls and rapids. The National Park Service ranks it highly in its Nationwide Rivers Inventory for scenery and geology.

The river is highly regarded for its sport fishing, especially for steelhead trout. Camping and canoeing are also popular, though both are considered difficult due to a lack of supporting facilities.

== Scenic waterfalls ==
The following is a partial list of waterfalls along the Huron River and its branches, generally listed in order heading upstream.

=== Huron River, mainstream ===
- Lower Huron Falls (Big Erick's Falls)

=== Huron River East Branch ===
- East Branch Falls
- Big Falls

=== Huron River West Branch ===
- West Branch Falls
- Lower Letherby Falls
- Leatherby Falls
- Upper Leatherby Falls
