= Port Huron (disambiguation) =

Port Huron is the name of a city and a township in St. Clair County, Michigan. See:

- Port Huron, Michigan
- Port Huron Township, Michigan

See also:

- Port Huron Statement
