= Huron (English band) =

British thrash metal band

Huron are an English thrash metal band formed in Plymouth in late 2007. They released their first studio album, Cheyne Stoking, in June 2009 on Rising Records. The band have garnered positive critical attention for their live performances. They released their fourth studio recording The Dead Stay Dead in February 2016.

== Biography ==
Huron were signed in 2008 by Rising Records UK. Their debut album titled Cheyne Stoking came out in 2009 and received glowing reviews from the international music press with a KKKK in Kerrang! and 8/10 in Rock Sound. In May 2009 Bruce Dickinson played the track "Break Your Neck" and talked about the album on his BBC radio show. Huron then toured the UK extensively with bands including Valient Thorr and Viking Skull and got their first festival booking with the Clive Aid Festival along with Marshall Law and Praying Mantis. Huron continued touring the UK and eventually got booked for the Hellfire Festival along with Saxon, Anvil and Fields of the Nephilim. During 2010 Huron were booked to play the Hammerfest II festival along with Devil Driver, Suicidal Tendencies, Orange Goblin and Iced Earth.

After a successful tour and debut festivals, Huron went into the studio to start recording their second album, Mary Celeste, which was released worldwide through Casket Records UK on 30 May 2011. This album was well received by global audiences and achieved 7/10 with the Metal Hammer magazine. 2011 saw Huron play Hard Rock Hell V The Metal Gods Festival which finished of a very productive year. The momentum started building with their music being played on Total Rock Radio, Planet Rock and a host of others from all over Europe and the US. Towards the end of 2011, Huron were booked to play Hard Rock Hell V, sharing stage 2 with acts Sanity Days, Warbringer, and Hellfighter.

2012 saw the release of their anticipated third release, War Party, released as a promotional tool for fans and the music industry. This EP received 7/10 and a glowing review from Adam Rees of the Metal Hammer magazine. Apart from various supporting slots in 2012, Huron went on to also play three festivals: The Download Festival (7 June), The Bulldog Bash (10 August), and the Bloodstock Festival (12 August).

War Party, a 4-track promo CD, was self-released and was reviewed in the August 2012 edition of the Metal Hammer..."The Title says it all! The Brutish grooves and snarling attitude on Bite The Kerb and Mercy Killing are suitably belligerent, with choruses to put Huron on the radar of Five Finger Death Punch Fans!" - 7/10 Adam Rees 2012.

Shows with Evile, Onslaught, and Alestorm made 2012 their busiest year to date with the Download Festival.

A UK Tour with Skindred took place in December 2012.

Between 2013 and 2015, the band focused on writing and recording its fourth studio release The Dead Stay Dead. Concert appearances were limited aside from some charity shows, the odd small festival and a support slot with Ill Niño. The new album artwork for The Dead Stay Dead was created by Mark Rudolph. The Dead Stay Dead was mixed and mastered by Justin Hill of the UK metal band SikTh.

=== Festivals to date ===
- The Clive Aid Festival 2008
- Rock Fest 2008
- The Hellfire Festival 2009
- Hammerfest II 2010
- Devon Rox Festival 2011
- Hard Rock Hell V 2011 (Stage 2)
- Cradle Will Rock Festival 2011
- Metal Gods Festival 2011
- Big Red Bash Festival 2011
- Download Festival 2012 (Takeover Stage)
- Bulldog Bash Festival 2012
- Bloodstock Festival 2012 (New Blood Stage)
- Rock & Metal Circus Festival 2013
- Hammerfest VI (Main Stage) 2014 Out OF The Ashes Festival 2014 Thrashasaurus Festival 2015 Download Festival 2015 (Headlining Take Over Stage) Rock Diabestes 2015

== Members ==
- Dave Israelite Parsons (drums)
- Rimmy Sinclair (guitar)
- Chris Smith (guitar)
- Rohan James (bass/vocals)
- Sean Palmer (vocals)

=== Former members ===
- Neil Sims (guitar)
- Steve Wile (drums)
- Damian Diablo (drums ex Three Dice)
- Rory Conroy (drums)
- Steve Sampson (guitar)
- Phil Griffin (bass)
- Chris Newman (bass)

== Discography ==
- Filthy Sex Metal Promo 8 track EP
- Cheyne Stoking (2009)
- Mary Celeste (2011)
- War Party EP (2012)
- The Eternal Sea (2015)
- The Dead Stay Dead (2016)
