= Indian Springs Metropark =

- Location within Huron-Clinton Metroparks
- Type: Regional park
- Location: Lower Peninsula, White Lake, Oakland County, Michigan USA
- Coordinates: 42.706444°N 83.483622°W
- Area: 2,547 acres (1,031 ha)
- Operator: Huron–Clinton Metroparks
- Status: Open year round
- Website: Official site

Indian Springs Metropark is a park in the Huron-Clinton system of metro parks in the US state of Michigan. The headwaters of the Huron River lie within its boundaries.

The park encompasses 2,547 acres (10.31 km^{2}) and is located 9 miles (14 km) northwest of Pontiac. Much of the park is dedicated to the preservation and interpretation of the natural environment. The park has an 18-hole regulation golf course, an Environmental Discovery Center, an underwater pond viewing room, a splash-n-play park, a life-sized maze, a nature center, an 8-mile paved hike-bike trail, 12 miles of cross country ski trails, and picnic areas.
