= Little Huron River =

Location
- Country: United States
- State: Michigan
- District: Marquette County

Physical characteristics
- Source: Mt. Benison, north ridge
  - location: Powell Township, Marquette County, Michigan, United States
  - coordinates: 46°52′43″N 87°57′52″W
  - elevation: 1,150 ft (350 m)
- Mouth: Lake Superior
  - location: Powell Township, Marquette County, Michigan, United States
  - coordinates: 46°54′22″N 88°0′6″W
  - elevation: 614 ft (187 m)

The Little Huron River is an 8.0-mile-long (12.9 km) stream that flows entirely within Powell Township in northwest Marquette County, Michigan, in the United States. It rises on the slopes of Mount Benison and Superior Mountain in the west end of the Huron Mountains. For almost half of its length it flows generally southwesterly then westerly as it is joined by creeks from other arms of its valley. It then turns north, flowing through gentler terrain to its mouth on the south shore of Lake Superior. The Little Huron River drainage basin is 15.8 square miles (41 km^{2}).

== Name confusion ==
The Little Huron River is not a branch of the nearby Huron River to its west, although they are separated by less than 1.5 miles (2.4 km) at their mouths. Adding to name confusion, the Huron River has Little West Branch and Little East Branch tributaries. Also, Huron River Point along Lake Superior is 5 miles (8 km) east of the Little Huron River mouth, closer to the Little Huron River than to the Huron River.
