= Kensington Metropark =

Park in Oakland County, Michigan, United States of America

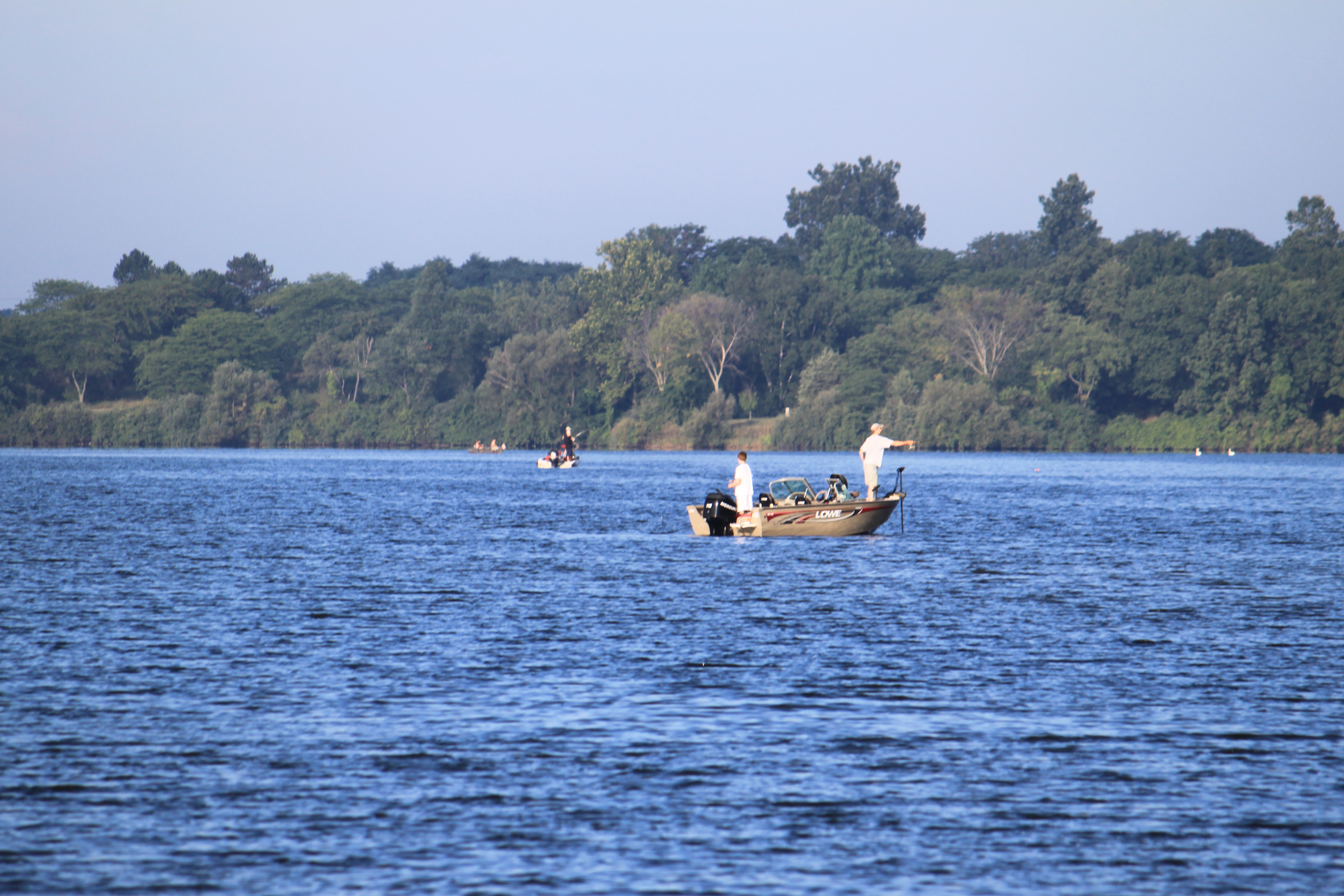
- Fishing on Kent Lake

- Location within Huron-Clinton Metroparks
- Type: Regional park
- Location: Milford Township / Lyon Township, Oakland County, Michigan USA
- Coordinates: 42.528951°N 83.655001°W
- Area: 4,543 acres (1,838 ha)
- Created: 1947
- Operator: Huron–Clinton Metroparks
- Status: Open year round
- Website: Official site

Kensington Metropark is a park in Oakland County, Michigan, USA. Located between the towns of Milford and South Lyon, the park is part of the Huron–Clinton Metroparks system. Surrounding Kent Lake, the park covers 4,543 acres (18.13 km^{2}). It has wooded hilly terrain and surrounds 1,200-acre (4.9 km^{2}) Kent Lake (a dammed section of the Huron River). The park has an 18-hole regulation golf course, 3 disc golf courses, a toboggan hill, a nature center, a farm learning center, picnic areas, beaches, a splash pad with a water slide, and boat rentals. An 8-mile (13 km) paved hike-bike trail, 19 miles (31 km) of horse trails and 7 miles (11 km) of hiking-only trails are available as well as connecting trails to other nearby parks. Camping is permitted in organized group camping or canoe-in sites.

Kensington Metropark opened in 1947. The area now occupied by the park was once home to the village of Kensington which turned into a ghost town after a railroad line that went through the village was diverted to neighboring South Lyon.

The park receives 2.5 million visitors per year.

== Gallery ==
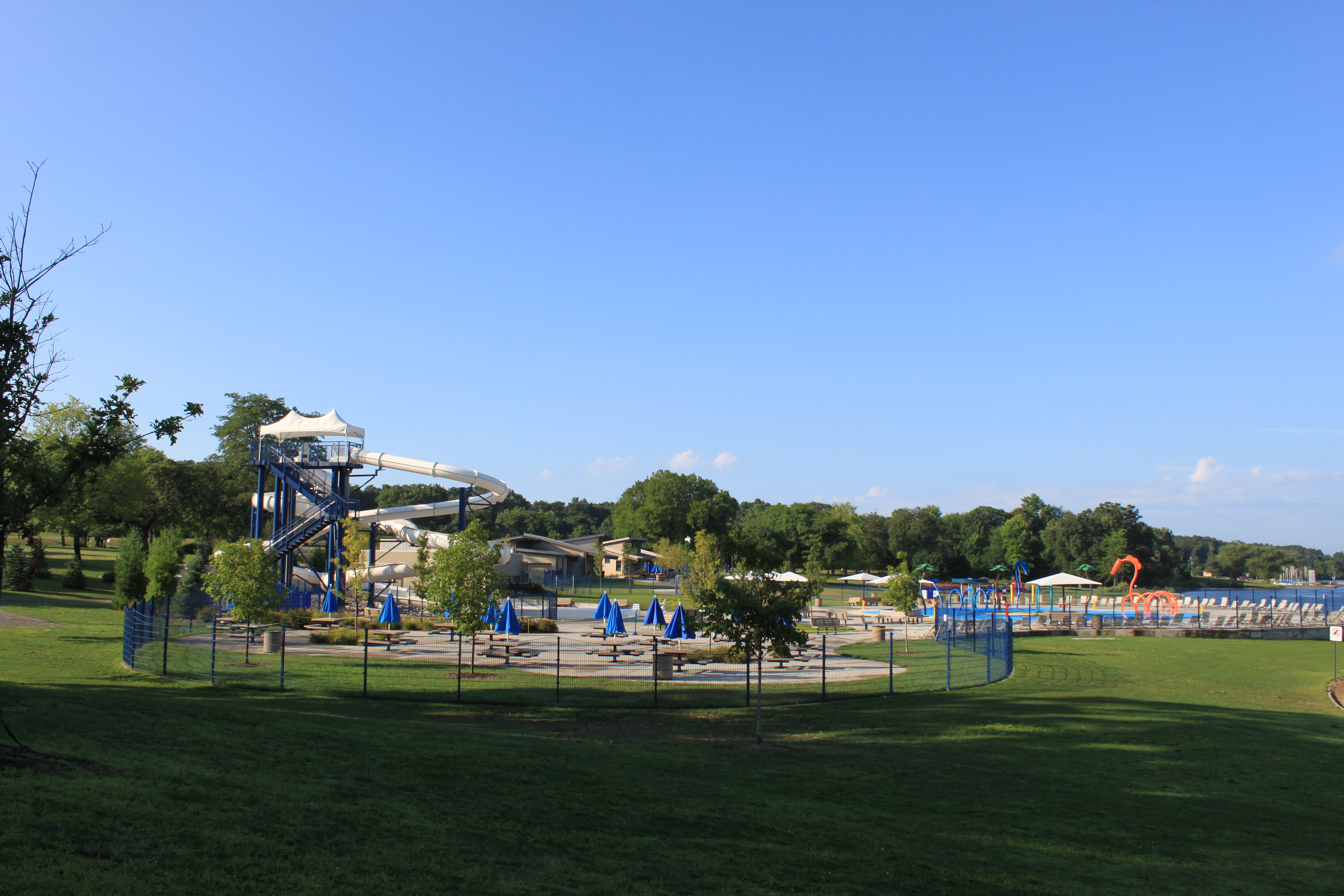
Martindale Beach Splash 'n' Bash

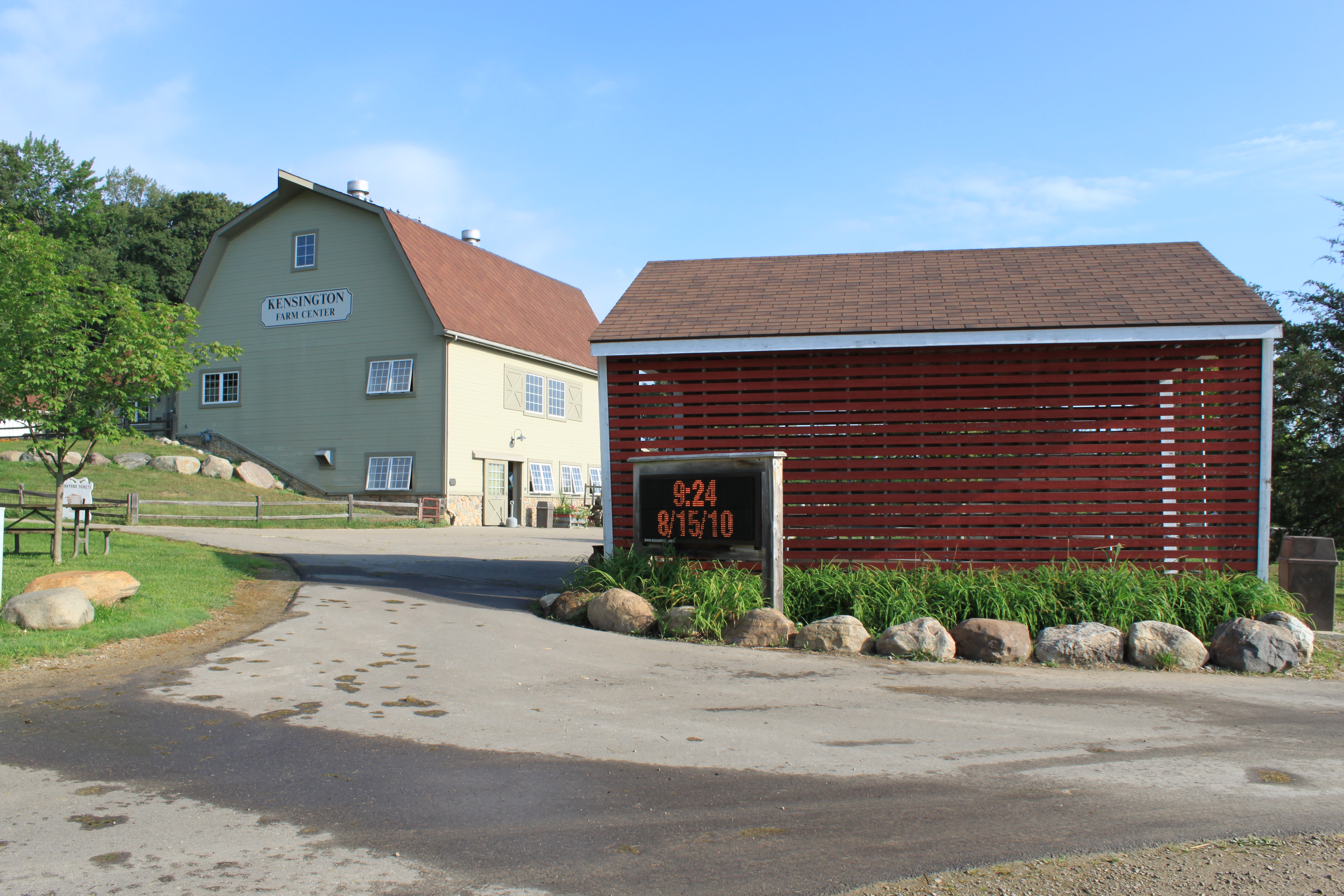
Farm Center

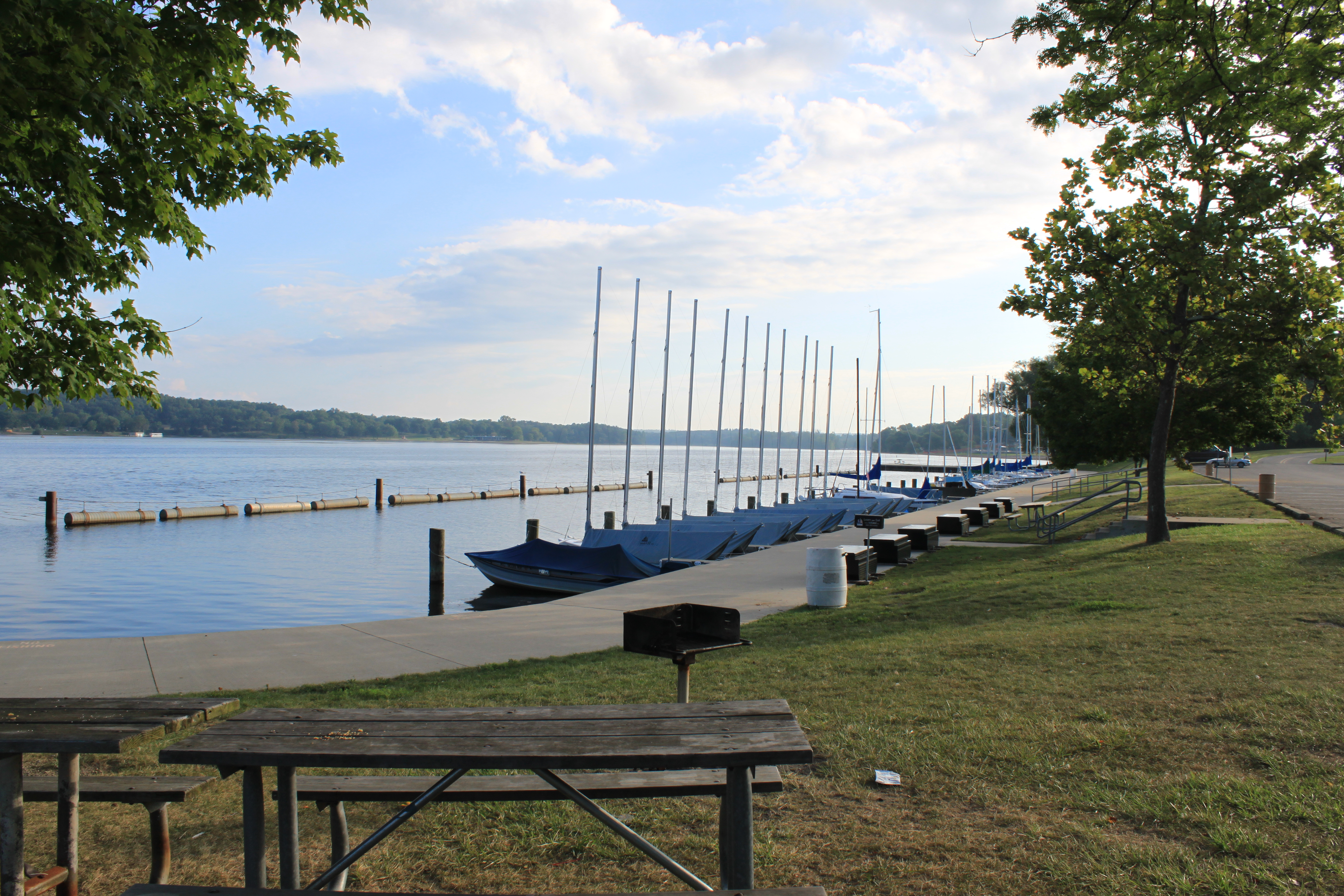
East boat launch

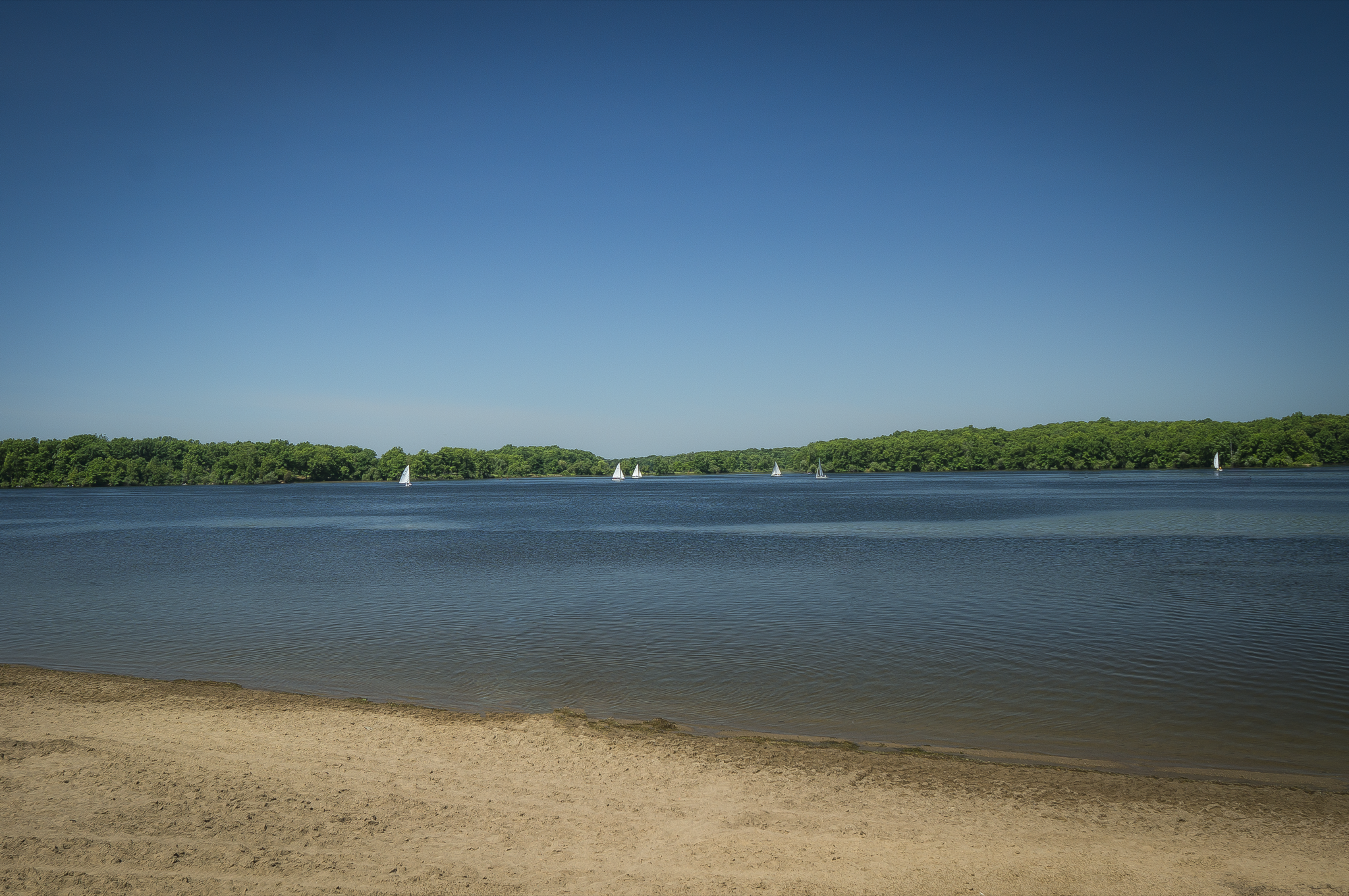
Kensington MetroPark

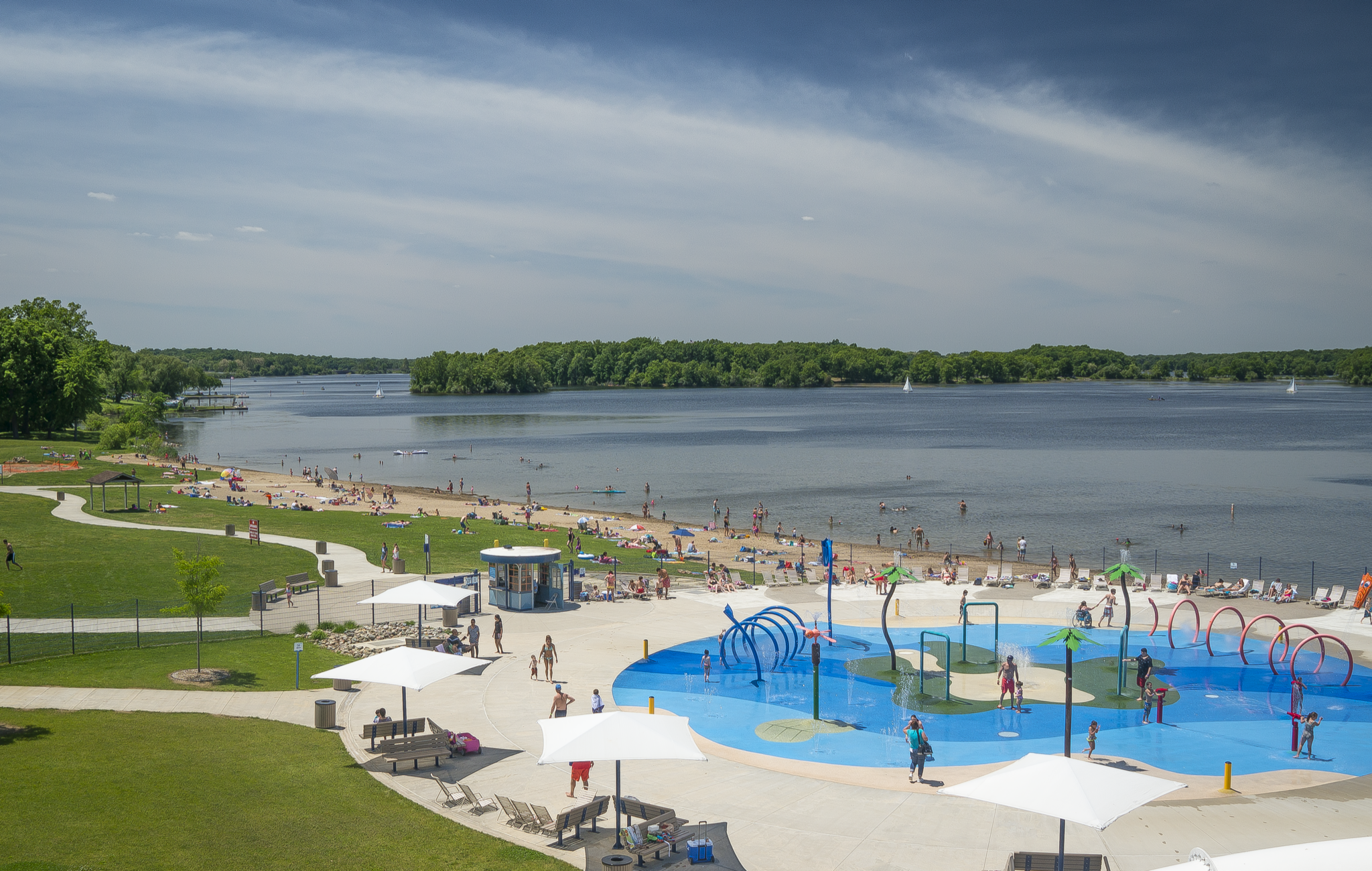
Kensington Splash
