= Huron University (disambiguation) =

Huron University may refer to:

- Huron University College, London, Ontario, Canada (founded 1863), a component institution of the University of Western Ontario
- Huron University, Huron, South Dakota, US (1883–2005) a defunct university
- Huron University USA in London, London, England, UK (1989–2008) a defunct university, formerly called "Huron University" (2001–2008)

== See also ==
- Huron College (disambiguation)
