= Swift Run =

Stream in Michigan, United States

Swift Run Swift Drain
- Lower course of Swift Run in Ann Arbor Township

Physical characteristics
- Source: Pittsfield Township
- Mouth: Huron River
  - location: Geddes Pond, Ann Arbor
  - coordinates: 42°16′06″N 83°40′52″W
- Length: 4.8 mi (7.7 km)
- Basin size: 4.7 sq mi (12 km^{2})

Swift Run, also known as Swift Run Drain or Swift Drain, is a roughly 4.8-mile-long (7.7 km) tributary to the Huron River in Pittsfield Township and Ann Arbor, Michigan. It runs north from an area of farmland in Pittsfield, crossing under several highways as it flows through urban residential areas of eastern Ann Arbor, before its forested lower course leads it to the confluence with the Huron River at the Geddes Pond reservoir. A partially ephemeral stream, much of the channel runs dry or becomes stagnant ponds during the mid-summer. During storms, flow rates can become very high, and E. coli bacteria concentrations can reach unsafe levels. The creek basin was covered by wetland, oak–hickory forest, and oak barrens prior to Euro-American colonization in the 1800s, but only 21% of the watershed now consists of natural areas.

== Hydrology ==
Swift Run is a small tributary to the Huron River in Southeast Michigan, running along a glacial moraine which once formed the western edge of the Lake Erie plain. Comprising one main channel about 4.8 miles (7.7 km) in length, it emerges in an area of farmland and forest in Pittsfield Township and flows generally northeast, entering the eastern portion of Ann Arbor near Lillie Park, flowing through the city's landfill. It flows under the Interstate 94 (I-94) freeway, passing through two small ponds. Running through urban areas of Ann Arbor, it crosses under the cloverleaf interchange of US Highway 23 (US 23) and Washtenaw Avenue near Arborland Center. After crossing a heavily developed area east of US 23, the channel enters the relatively forested area of its lower course. Crossing west back under US 23, it enters South Pond and eventually Geddes Pond, a reservoir on the Huron River created by Geddes Dam. The Huron River continues through Southeast Michigan, emptying into Lake Erie south of the city of Flat Rock.

Swift Run receives a small amount of cold groundwater flow, with most of its streamflow coming from warmer surface runoff. Upstream of US 23, the stream is ephemeral, only flowing during storms, with only the lower 3.7 miles (6.0 km) being classified as perennial by the United States Geological Survey. Much of the stream channel runs dry or becomes stagnant ponds during the mid-summer. A dam is located along the upper course of the creek, forming a small pond used for irrigation. The creek's average slope is 17 feet per mile (3.2 m/km), a little above the average 16 feet per mile (3.0 m/km) for the Huron River's tributaries. Although erosion rates along the upper reaches of the stream are moderate, the area downstream of its first crossing of US 23 is highly eroded. The creek erodes about 759 tons of soil per year.

Swift Run has high flashiness (the rate stream flow rises and falls during storms) in comparison to other Michigan streams, although it is near average in comparison to similar streams across the broader Midwest. During two year interval storms (the largest storm expected in two years), flow rates can reach as high as 273 cubic feet (7,700 L) per second. If the creek had an entirely natural watershed, it would be expected to reach only 53 cubic feet (1,500 L) during such a storm.

Due to the ephemeral nature of much of the creek, its flashiness, and the presence of many culverts across its length, there are probably very few fish in the creek. Small fish and minnows likely live in Haven Lake and the other small ponds of the watershed. Surveys of pollution-sensitive insect families such as stoneflies have shown very low levels of macroinvertebrate habitation in the creek. Only arthropods tolerant of a wide range of creek conditions, such as net-spinning caddisflies, midges, isopods, and scuds, are present. In 1985, marshland vegetation north of I-94 was found to be dominated by Typha (cattail) species and Sparganium eurycarpum (giant bull-reed). Muskrats build mounds in these marshes.

=== Water quality ===
Since monitoring began in 2003, Swift Run has consistently been found to have both high phosphorus levels (which can create algal blooms) and high suspended solids concentrations (a measure of turbidity/cloudiness and erosion rates). These levels have fluctuated over time, but shown no consistent trend. Nitrate and nitrite levels in the creek were found to be moderate in 2020, below the Environmental Protection Agency’s Maximum Contaminant Levels. The conductivity of the creek is high, with levels in the lower portions nearly twice as high as those upstream. Correlated with total dissolved solids, this likely indicates that salts, metals, and other naturally occurring minerals are present in the creek, impairing water quality. However, the water's pH has generally been within acceptable levels.

Levels of E. coli bacteria are often high in Swift Run, above safety standards for full-body contact. Likely due to the high amount of impervious surfaces in the watershed, these levels can rise even higher after storms, making even partial bodily contact inadvisable. The creek can take 48 hours after storms to return to safer E. coli levels. Although the creek is well-shaded due to frequent vegetation on the streambanks, water temperature is moderately higher than expected, likely due to limited groundwater flow.

== History and land use ==
Prior to Euro-American colonization and settlement, Swift Run originated from a forested swampland and ran through stretches of oak–hickory forest and oak barrens before its confluence with the Huron. Colonial settlement in the region began during the early 1800s. The first manufacturer in Pittsfield Township, an agriculture equipment shop owned by settler Aaron Barney, operated near the creek from 1824 to 1835. Historically, the creek was also known as Whitmore Creek.

Most of the 4.7-square-mile (12 km^{2}) drainage basin of Swift Run is made up of residential and urban areas. In addition to Ann Arbor and Pittsfield Township, it drains small areas of Ann Arbor Township, with the far eastern edge of the watershed stretching into Superior Township and Ypsilanti Township. Forests, open areas, and wetlands comprise about 21% of the watershed, while about 22% is covered by impervious surfaces such as pavement. As of 2020, about half the natural areas in the watershed were protected from development. The creek headwaters are protected by the Pittsfield Preserve, an area of protected forest created by the Pittsfield Township government. To preserve the existing hydrology, the area surrounding the headwaters is zoned for agriculture.
