= Huron County =

Huron County is the name of several counties in North America:

- Huron County, Michigan
- Huron County, Ohio
- Huron County, Ontario
