= Lake Trust Credit Union =

Credit Union in Michigan

Lake Trust
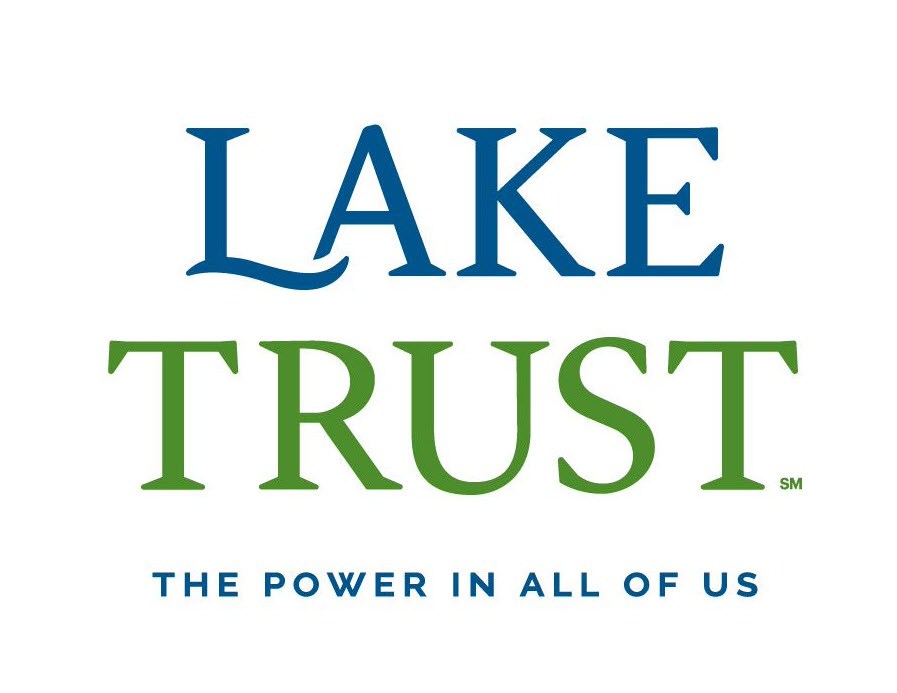

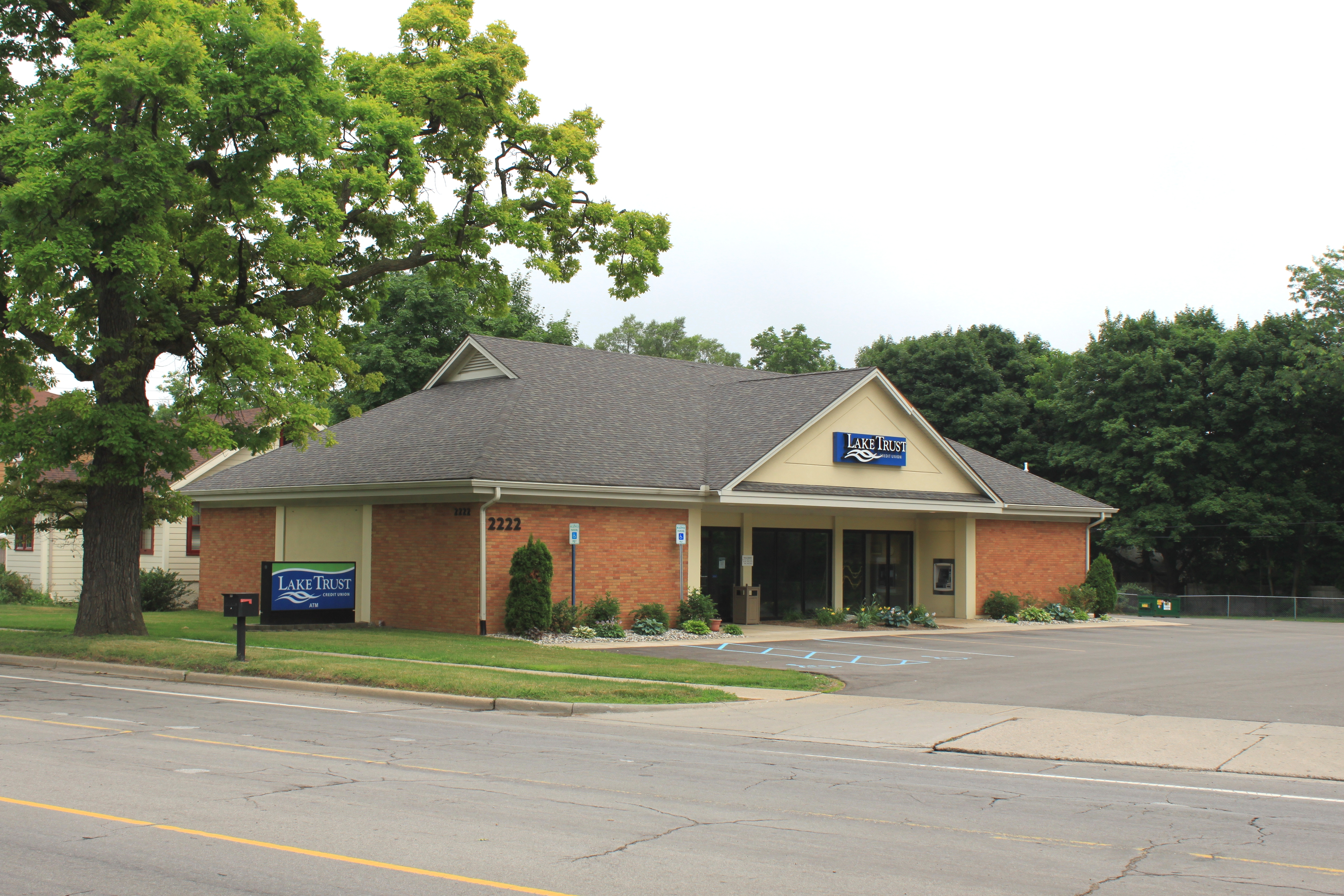
- A Lake Trust branch in Ann Arbor, Michigan.
- Type: Credit union
- Industry: Financial services
- Founded: 1944
- Headquarters: Brighton, Michigan, United States
- Number of locations: 22 (2024)
- Key people: David Snodgrass, President and Chief Executive Officer
- Products: Savings; checking; consumer loans; mortgages; credit cards; investments; online banking
- Total assets: $2.6+ billion USD (2023)
- Members: 180,000 (2023)
- Number of employees: 500 (2023)
- Website: laketrust.org

Lake Trust Credit Union is a community-based credit union headquartered in Brighton, Michigan. As a not-for-profit financial cooperative, Lake Trust is owned by members of the credit union and regulated under the authority of the National Credit Union Administration (NCUA). The organization is governed and supervised by an 18-member board of directors.

As of September 2023, Lake Trust has branches in more than 20 cities, towns, and villages throughout Michigan, serving nearly 200,000 individual and business members. With more than $2.5 billion in assets, it ranks in the top 1% of credit unions nationwide.

== History ==
- April 2010: Lake Trust Credit Union was established when Detroit Edison Credit Union merged with NuUnion Credit Union to establish Lake Trust Credit Union. NuUnion had been a 2004 merger of State Employees Credit Union and Ottawa County School Employees Credit Union
- A year after the merger, David Snodgrass, a former executive at Affinity Federal Credit Union in New Jersey was named President and CEO of Lake Trust.
- In 2012, the Lake Trust Foundation, a 501(c)(3) organization was founded.
- March 2013: Lake Trust Credit Union announced they would be building a new $30 million headquarters in Brighton, Michigan. The site includes a new 100,000 square foot building designed to more efficiently and effectively join their employees who were split between corporate offices located in Lansing, Michigan, Plymouth, and Brighton.
- September 2015: Lake Trust headquarters was officially moved to Brighton, Michigan. The building, designed by SmithGroup, was established to be innovative and collaborative, where people are encouraged to work together in open spaces. It includes a restaurant and fitness center.
- In 2017: Lake Trust became a certified Community Development Financial Institution (CDFI). It is currently Michigan’s largest CDFI credit union, focused on creating opportunities for the financially underserved.

== Membership ==
According to the Lake Trust website, membership at Lake Trust is open to anyone who lives, works, attends school, or worships in the state of Michigan.

There are other ways to be eligible for membership:

- Retirees of legal entities located in the state of Michigan.
- Those with an immediate family member that is a Lake Trust member.
- A spouse of a deceased member.

== Financial Life Planning ==
The Lake Trust Financial Life Planning (FLP) team offers a variety of services to members including investment and insurance options.

== The Lake Trust Foundation ==
Established in 2012, the Lake Trust Foundation is a 501(c)(3) organization. The Lake Trust Foundation focuses on supporting economic empowerment, health, and education.
