= Huron River =

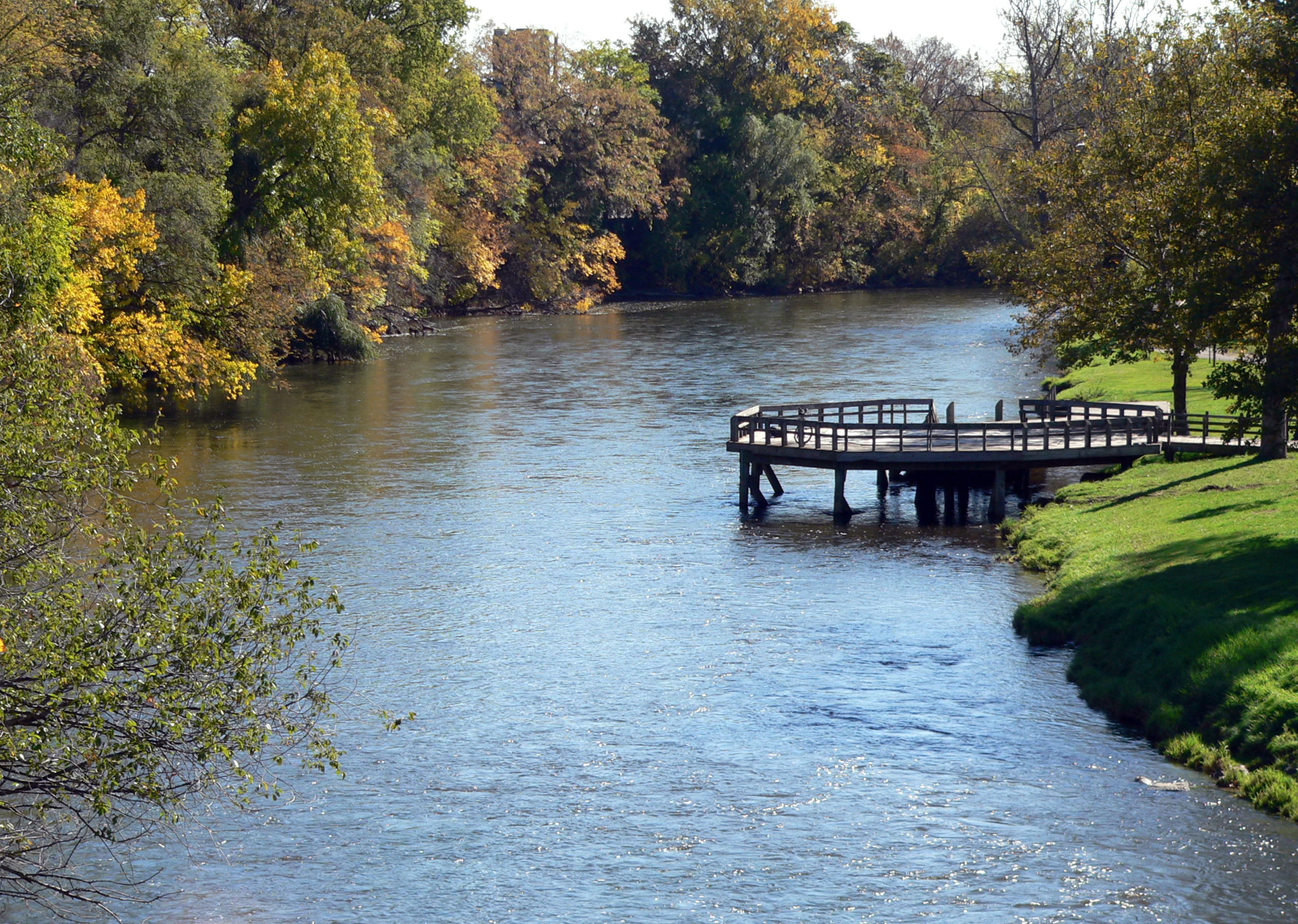
- Huron River in Ypsilanti

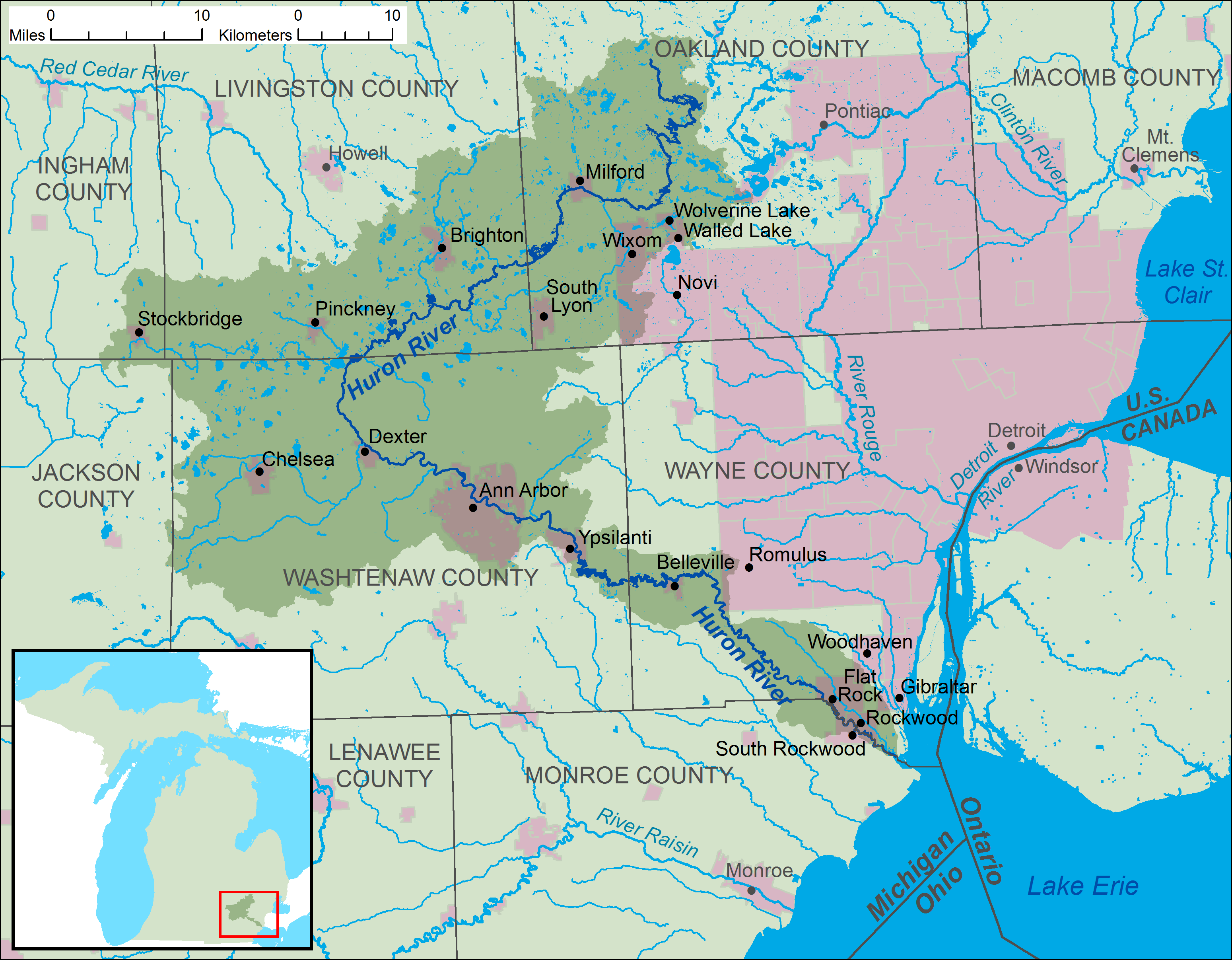
- A map of the Huron River and its watershed.

Location
- Country: United States
- State: Michigan
- Counties: Oakland, Livingston, Washtenaw, Wayne, Monroe

Physical characteristics
- Source: Huron Swamp
  - location: south of Andersonville
  - elevation: 1,001 ft (305 m)
- Mouth: Lake Erie
  - location: southeast of Rockwood
  - coordinates: 42.039°N 83.202°W
  - elevation: 571 ft (174 m)
- Length: 130 mi (210 km)
- Basin size: 908 sq mi (2,350 km^{2})
- Discharge
  - location: mouth
  - average: 720.75 cu ft/s (20.409 m^{3}/s) (estimate)

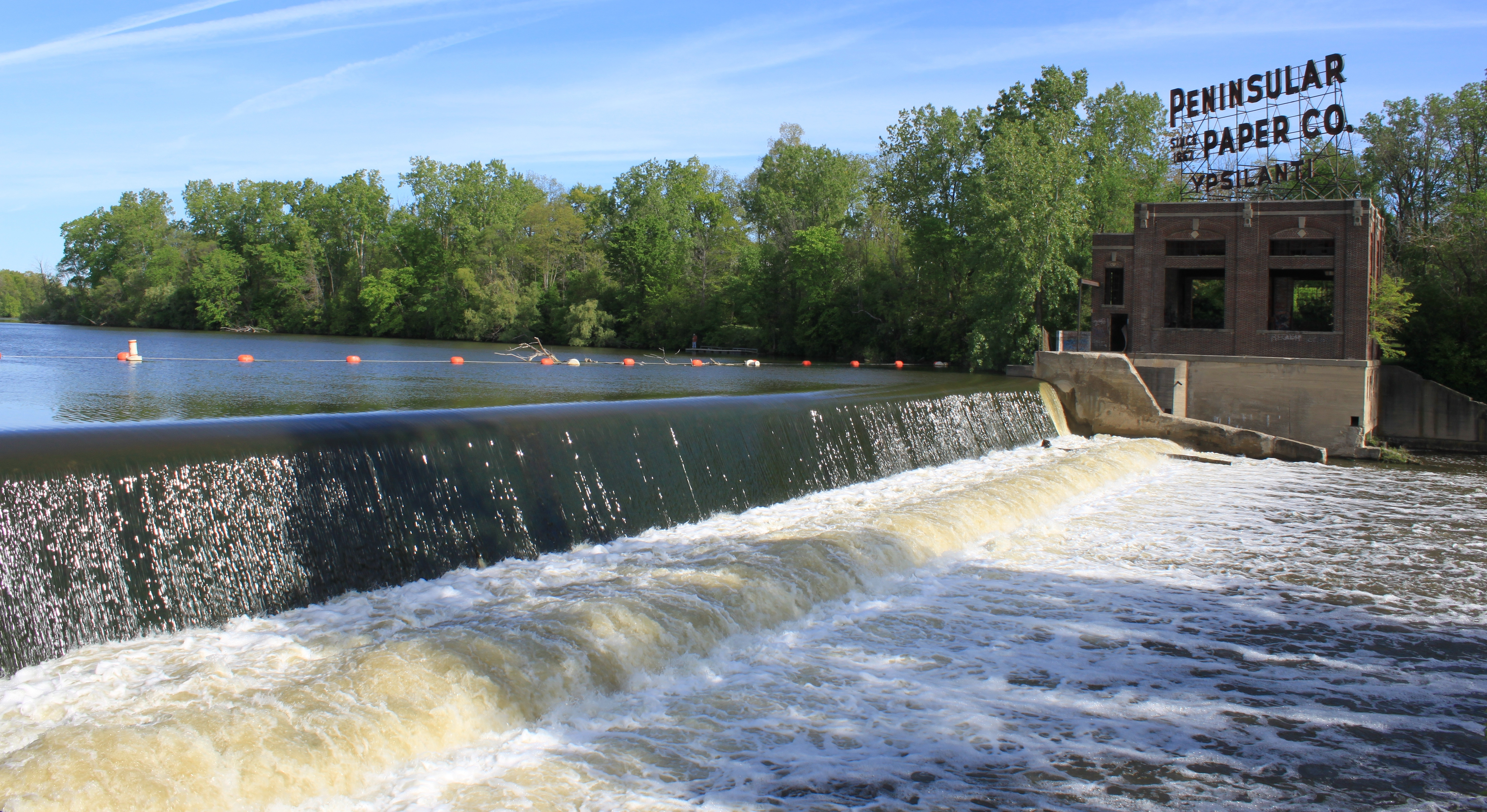
Peninsular Dam, Ypsilanti

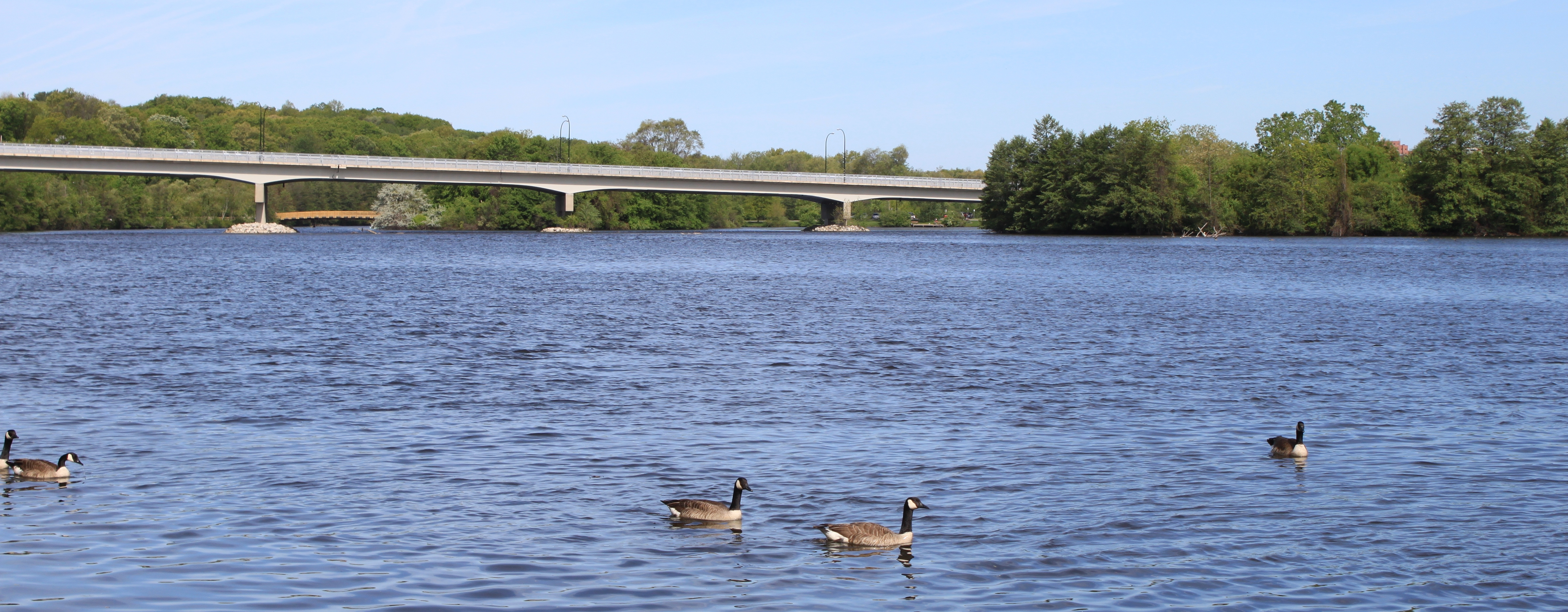
Huron Parkway bridge over Geddes Pond viewed from Gallup Park, Ann Arbor

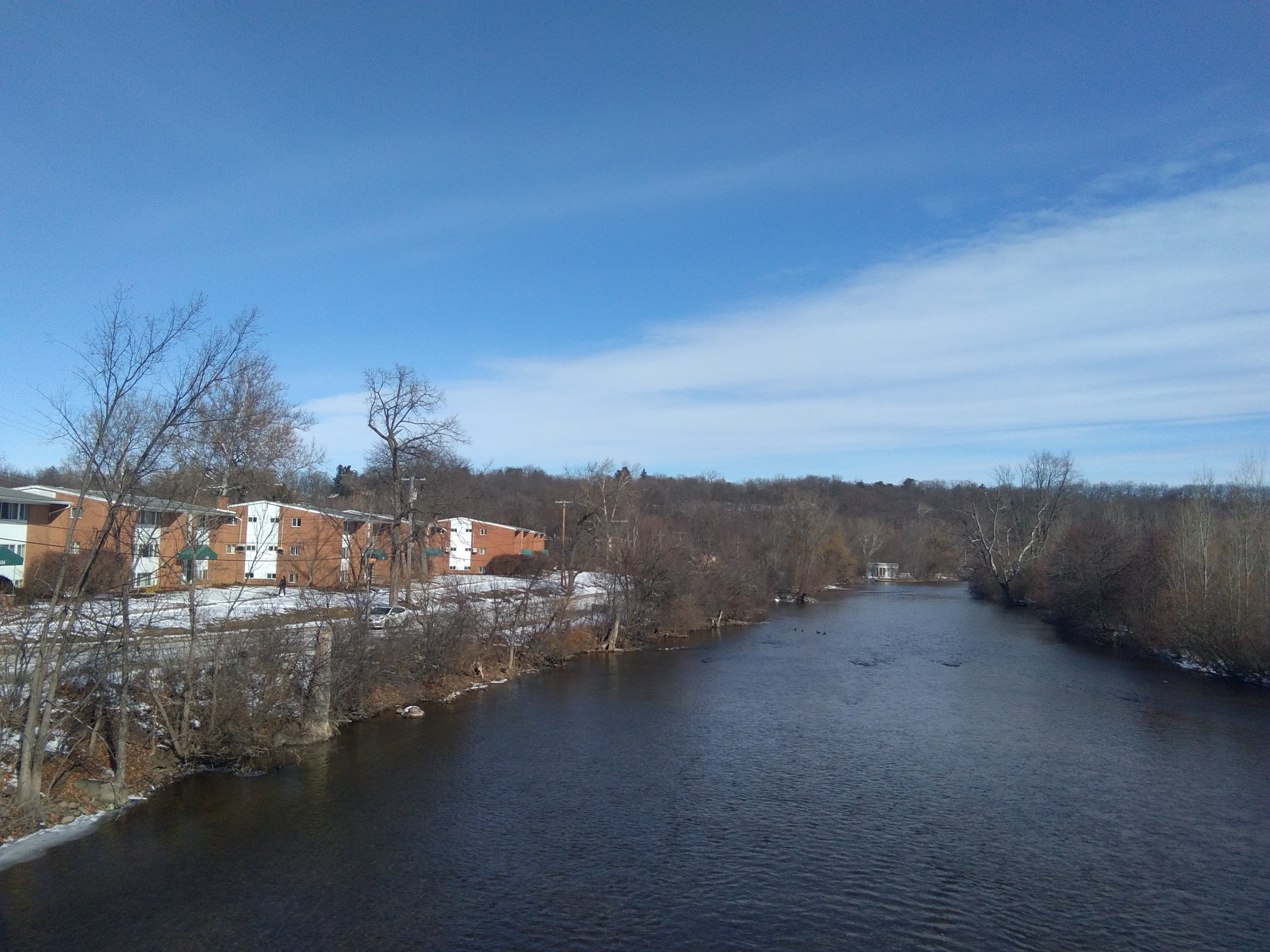
Huron River near downtown Ann Arbor

The Huron River is a 130-mile-long (210 km) river in southeastern Michigan, rising out of the Huron Swamp in Springfield Township in northern Oakland County and flowing into Lake Erie, as it forms the boundary between present-day Wayne and Monroe counties. Thirteen parks, game areas, and recreation areas are associated with the river, which passes through the cities of Dexter, Ann Arbor, Ypsilanti, Belleville, Flat Rock and Rockwood that were developed along its banks.

The Huron River is a typical Southeast Michigan stream; mud banks, slow stream flow and a low gradient define this river. It runs through the following counties, in order from the headwaters to its mouth: Oakland, Livingston, Washtenaw, Wayne, and Monroe. There are 24 major tributaries totaling about 370 miles (600 km) in addition to the mainstream. The Huron River watershed drains 908 square miles (2,350 km^{2}). It is the only state-designated Country-Scenic Natural River in southeast Michigan. This includes 27.5 miles (44.3 km) of the mainstream, plus an additional 10.5 miles (16.9 km) of three tributaries.

The river was named after the Huron band of Native Americans who lived in the area. In Native languages, it was called cos-scut-e-nong sebee or Giwitatigweiasibi. It was part of a Native American trade route.

The river has many dams, 19 on the main stream and at least 96 in the entire system. Most dams are only a few feet high, built to slightly increase and maintain water levels in existing lakes to provide drought protection and flood control, a use that is now environmentally controversial. However, at least a dozen dams were built for mill or hydroelectric power and several formed large new lakes behind them. Some of these on the Huron River mainstream are Kent Lake, Barton Pond, Argo Pond, Ford Lake, Belleville Lake, and Flat Rock Pond.

The Huron River flows through numerous parks and is a prime canoeing river with a generally slow current and only a few minor rapids or obstructions, except for the short Delhi rapids which is runnable by experienced canoeists and kayakers except during low water.

The river is heavily fished by sportsmen for rock bass, sunfish, bluegill, black crappie, white bass, smallmouth bass, largemouth bass, northern pike, walleye, catfish, trout, muskie, and below Belleville Dam, Coho salmon, Chinook salmon, and Steelhead. Suckers and carp are also common fish in the river.

In 2009, faculty and students from the University of Michigan produced "Mapping the River," a multimedia presentation combining dance, poetry, music, and projected images which explored the role of the Huron in communities along it.

== History ==
In the 19th century, Congress declared the Huron River navigable, and for a time, there was flat-boat traffic from Ypsilanti to Lake Erie. This was discontinued as the railroads penetrated the region and milling developed along the river. By the 1880s, the Huron River was considered peculiar among the rivers in the region because it was intensely exploited for water-powered manufacturing. The census reported a total of 17 developed mill dams on the river, many providing power to multiple mills. Flour milling dominated, but there were also sawmills and woolen mills. As the 20th century began, the Detroit Edison Company and Ford Motor Company began acquiring and developing dams along the river for electric power.

=== Floods ===
Notable floods have occurred in 1904, 1918, 1968 and 1982.

== Tributaries ==
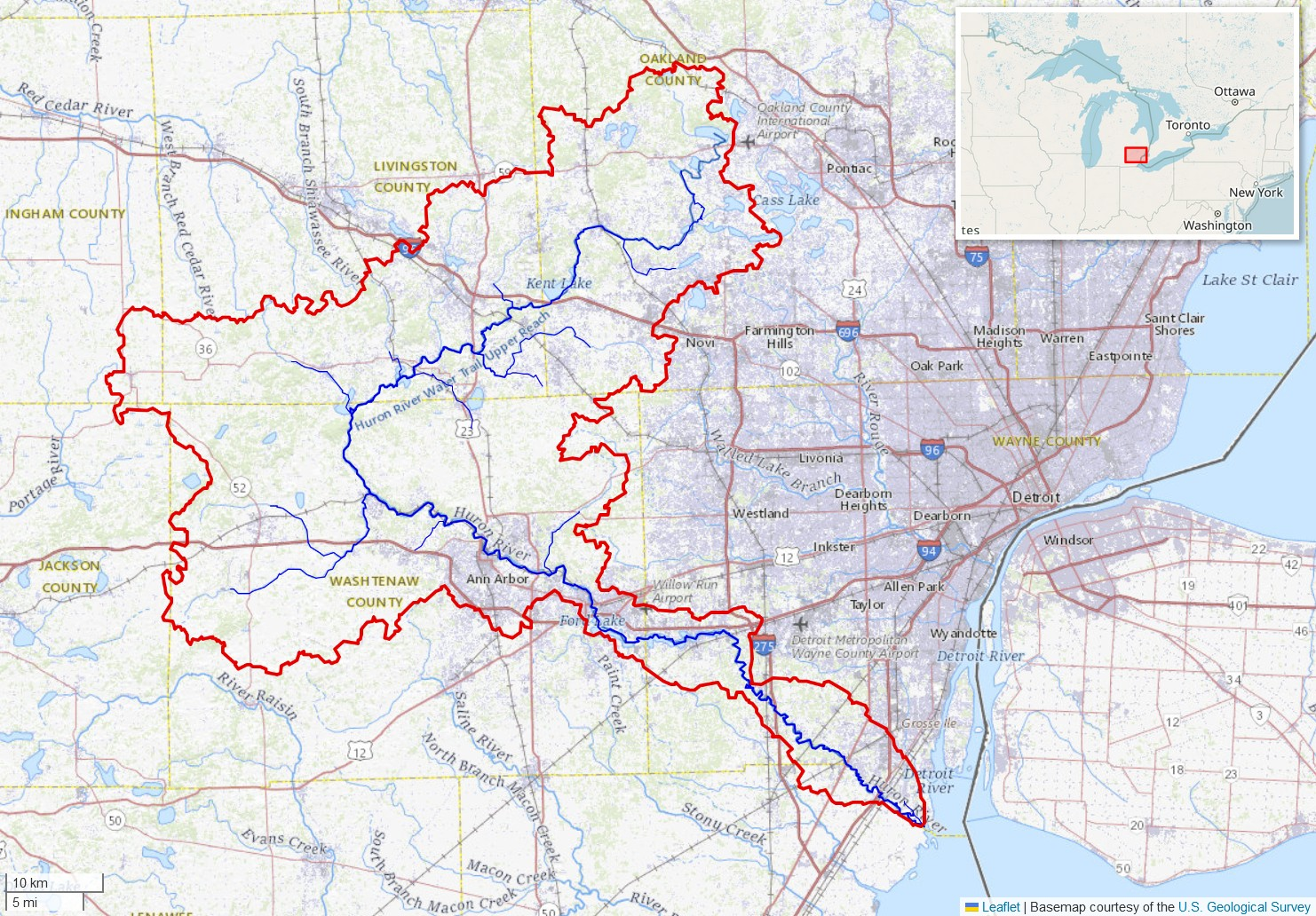
Huron River watershed (Interactive map)

Significant tributaries of the Huron River are listed below, in order of progression upstream. Sub-tributaries are indented below their parent watercourse.

- Smith Creek
- Silver Creek
- Port Creek
- Willow Run
- Fleming Creek
- Swift Run
- Malletts Creek
- Traver Creek
- Allen Creek
- Boyden Creek
- Honey Creek
- Millers Creek
- Mill Creek
- Portage River and Portage Creek
- Livermore Creek
- Arms Creek
- Honey Creek
- Hay Creek
- Chilson Creek
- Horseshoe Lake Creek
- South Ore Creek
- Davis Creek
- Woodruff Creek
- Mann Creek
- Pettibone Creek
- Norton Creek

== Path ==
The river flows through the following parks and cities in this order starting from the headwaters:

- Indian Springs Metropark
- Pontiac Lake Recreation Area
- Proud Lake State Recreation Area
- Milford
- Camp Dearborn
- Kensington Metropark
- Island Lake Recreation Area
- Huron Meadows Metropark
- Hudson Mills Metropark
- Dexter
- Dexter–Huron Metropark
- Delhi Metropark
- Ann Arbor
  - Nichols Arboretum
- Ypsilanti
- Lower Huron Metropark
- Willow Metropark
- Oakwoods Metropark
- Lake Erie Metropark
- Pointe Mouillee State Game Area

== Major dams ==
| Name | Image | Municipality | County | Coordinates | Built | Reservoir |
|---|---|---|---|---|---|---|
| Big Lake Dam | | Springfield Township | Oakland | 42°42′57″N 83°31′10″W | 1969 | Big Lake |
| Pontiac Lake Dam | | White Lake Township | Oakland | 42°39′42″N 83°27′09″W | 1930 | Pontiac Lake |
| Oxbow Lake Dam | | White Lake Township | Oakland | 42°38′28″N 83°28′56″W | 1965 | Oxbow Lake |
| Cedar Island Lake Dam | | White Lake Township | Oakland | 42°38′03″N 83°29′17″W | 1965 | Cedar Island Lake |
| Commerce Dam | | Commerce Township | Oakland | 42°34′09″N 83°30′15″W | 1965 | Commerce Lake |
| Proud Lake Dam | | Commerce Township | Oakland | 42°34′24″N 83°32′31″W | 1962 | Proud Lake |
| Hubble Dam | | Milford Township | Oakland | 42°35′03″N 83°37′02″W | 1939 | Hubble Pond |
| Kent Lake Dam | | Milford Township | Oakland | 42°30′47″N 83°40′33″W | 1946 | Kent Lake |
| Flook Dam | | Dexter Township | Washtenaw | 42°24′52″N 83°54′24″W | 1965 | Portage Lake; Baseline Lake |
| Barton Dam | Barton Dam | Ann Arbor | Washtenaw | 42°18′30″N 83°45′16″W | 1915 | Barton Pond |
| Argo Dam | Argo Dam | Ann Arbor | Washtenaw | 42°17′26″N 83°44′45″W | 1920 | Argo Pond |
| Geddes Dam | Geddes Dam | Ann Arbor; Township | Washtenaw | 42°16′15″N 83°40′17″W | 1919 | Geddes Pond |
| Superior Dam | Superior Dam | Superior Township | Washtenaw | 42°15′56″N 83°38′40″W | 1920 | unnamed |
| Peninsular Paper Dam | Peninsular Dam | Ypsilanti | Washtenaw | 42°15′22″N 83°37′27″W | 1914 | unnamed |
| Ford Lake Dam | Ford Lake Dam | Ypsilanti Township | Washtenaw | 42°12′22″N 83°33′28″W | 1931 | Ford Lake |
| French Landing Dam | French Landing Dam and Powerhouse | Van Buren Township | Wayne | 42°12′51″N 83°26′26″W | 1925 | Belleville Lake |
| Flat Rock Dam | Flat Rock Dam | Flat Rock | Wayne | 42°05′59″N 83°17′44″W | 1924 | Flat Rock Pond |

== Historical name confusion with Clinton River ==
The Clinton River was also known as the Huron River until 1824. The Clinton River, which drains into Lake St. Clair north of Detroit, shares about 10 miles (16 km) of watershed boundary with the Huron River system. It was renamed in 1824 by the Michigan Territorial Council to avoid confusion between the two rivers.

== See also ==
- Huron river chain of lakes
