= Pontiac Lake Recreation Area =

Recreation area in United States

Pontiac Lake State Recreation Area
- Location within Michigan Location within the United States
- Location: Lower Peninsula, Oakland County, Michigan USA
- Nearest city: Waterford, Michigan
- Coordinates: 42°40′32″N 83°28′14″W
- Area: 3,745 acres (1,516 ha)
- Governing body: Michigan Department of Natural Resources
- Website: Official website

Pontiac Lake State Recreation Area is located in White Lake Township, Oakland County, Michigan, just west of Waterford, Michigan. It is 3,745 acres (15.16 km^{2}) in size.

== Facilities ==
- Campground - 176 Sites, 24 Equestrian sites
- Beach House
- Boat Launch
- Picnic Area
- Picnic Shelter - Reservation required
- Playground
- Stable - Horse rental
- Store
- Shooting Range

== Activities ==
- Cross Country Skiing - 11 miles (18 km)
- Fishing
- Hiking - 11 miles (18 km)
- Horseback Riding - 17 miles (27 km)
- Hunting
- Metal Detecting
- Mountain Biking - 11 miles (18 km)
- Snow-mobiling
- Swimming
