= Willow Run Airport =

Airport in Ypsilanti, Michigan, United States

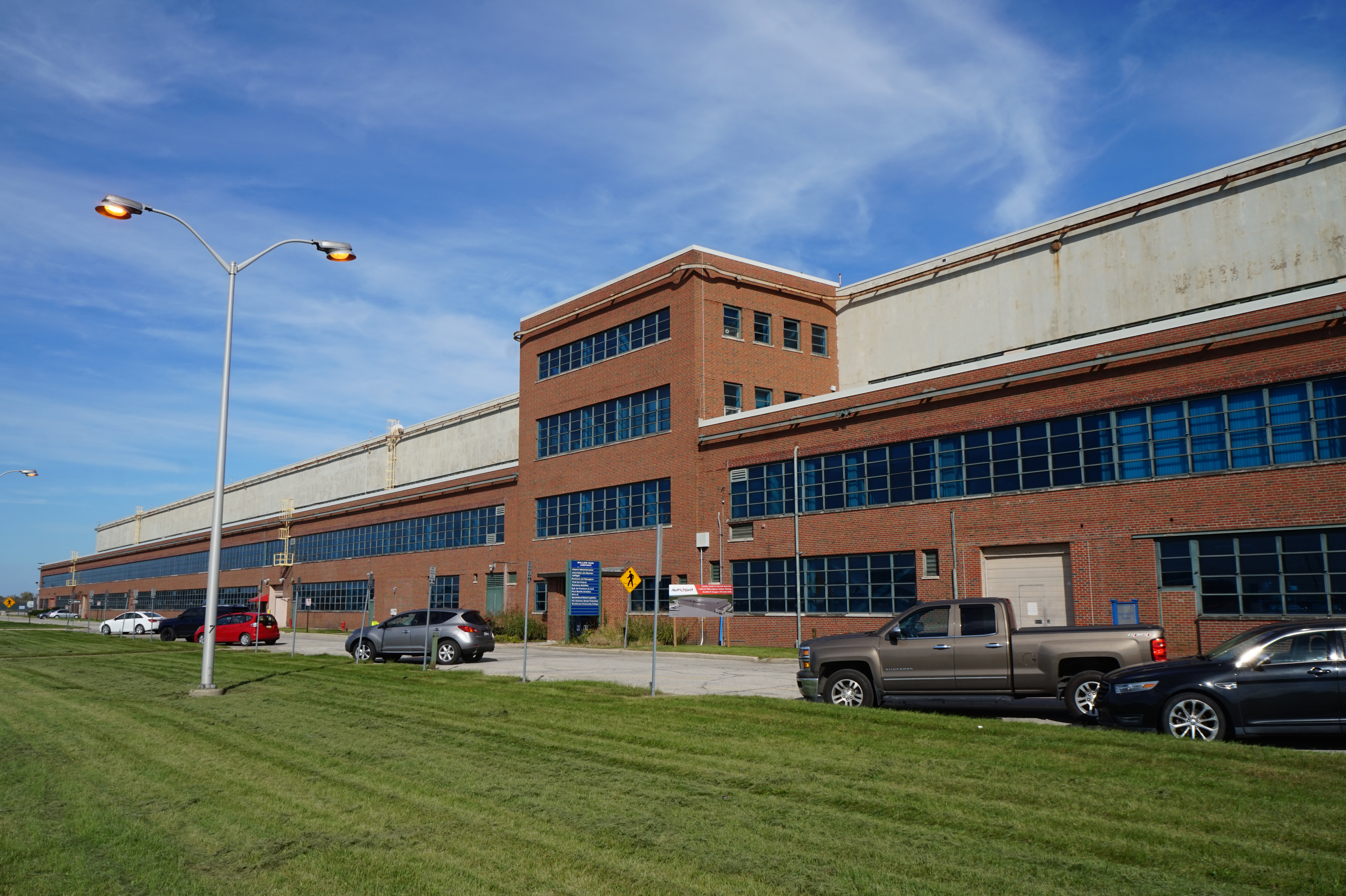
- IATA: YIP; ICAO: KYIP; FAA LID: YIP

Summary
- Airport type: Public
- Operator: Wayne County Airport Authority
- Location: Van Buren Charter Township and Ypsilanti Township
- Operating base for: USA Jet Airlines
- Elevation AMSL: 716 ft (218 m)
- Coordinates: 42°14′16.539″N 83°31′49.47″W
- Website: willowrunairport.com

Maps
- FAA diagram
- Interactive map of Willow Run Airport

Runways
Direction	Length		Surface
Direction	ft	m	Surface
5/23	7,543	2,299	Concrete
9/27	5,000	1,524	Asphalt
- Source: Federal Aviation Administration

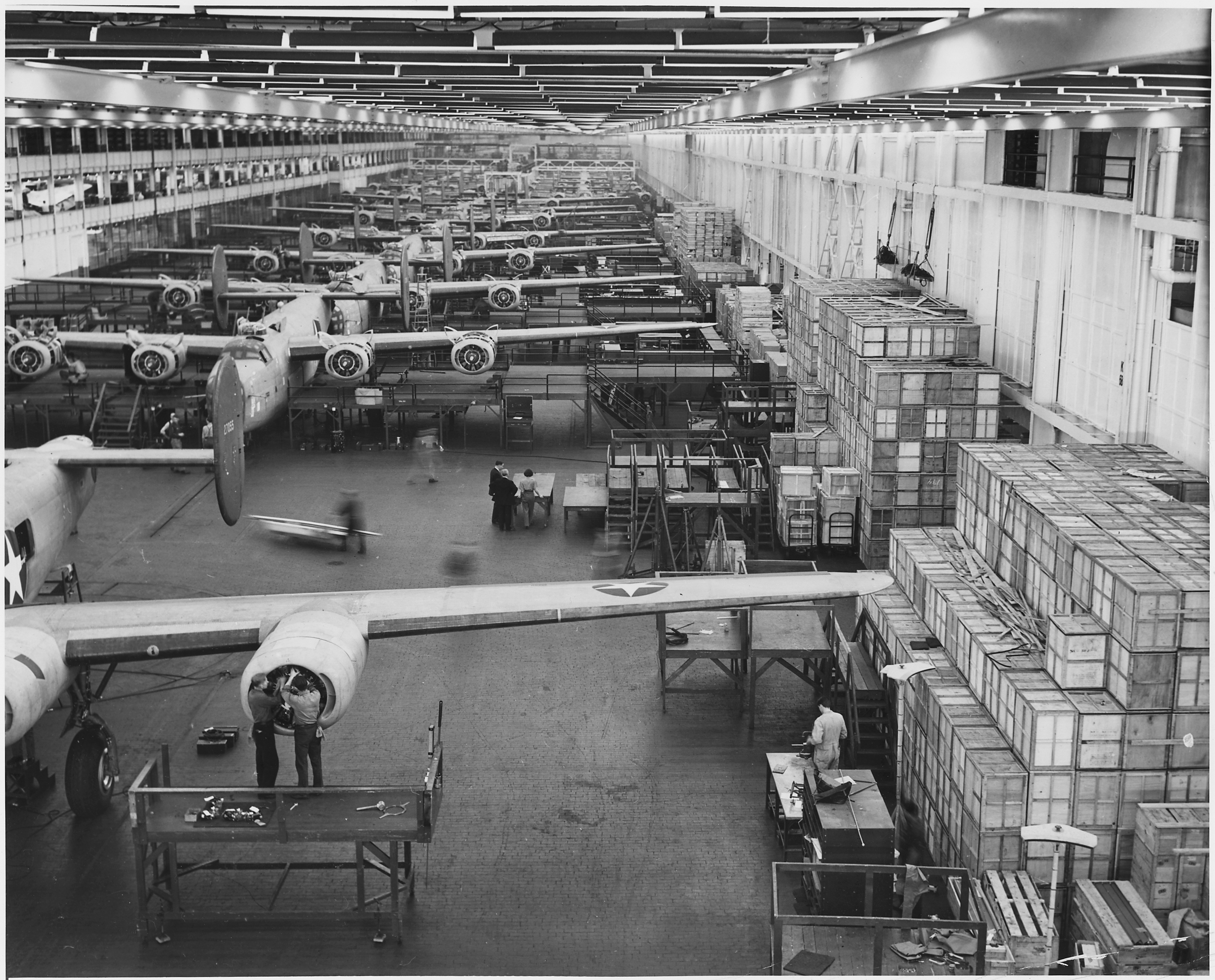
B-24 Liberators being manufactured by Ford, 1942

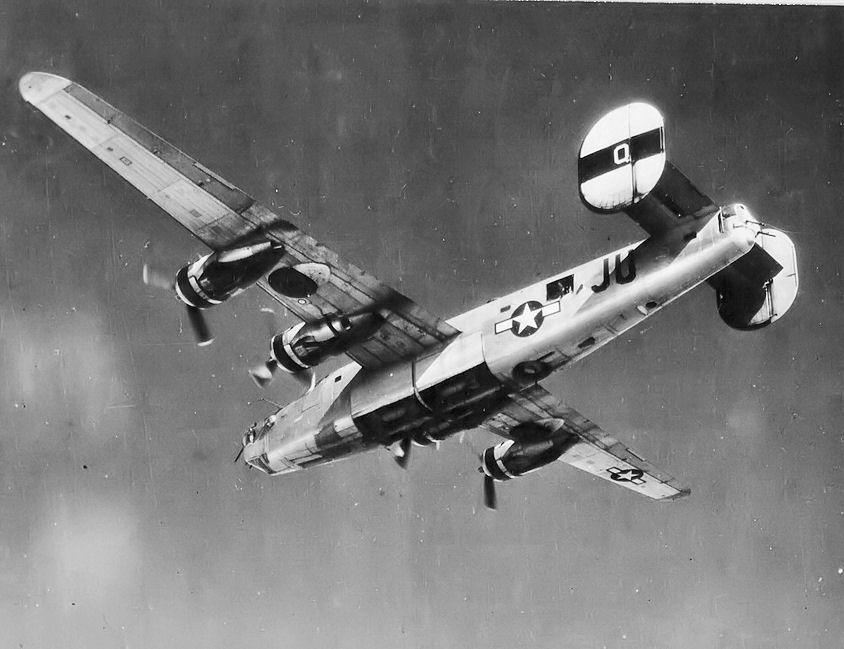
"Queenie" Willow Run built B-24J-5-FO Liberator, AAF Ser. No. 42-50773, assigned to the 707th Bombardment Squadron, 446th Bombardment Group, Eighth Air Force on a bomb run over Aschaffenburg, Germany, on February 25, 1945, attacking railroad marshalling yard facilities

Willow Run Airport (IATA: YIP, ICAO: KYIP, FAA LID: YIP) is a Wayne County-owned airport in Van Buren Charter Township and Ypsilanti Charter Township, near Ypsilanti, Michigan, United States, that serves freight, corporate, and general aviation. It is operated by the Wayne County Airport Authority.

Due to its very close proximity to Detroit Metropolitan Airport, no major airlines schedule passenger flights to or from Willow Run. It is included in the Federal Aviation Administration (FAA) National Plan of Integrated Airport Systems for 2017–2021, in which it is categorized as a national reliever airport facility. The Michigan Flight Museum is located in one of the airport's hangars and has a large collection of vintage aircraft.

Opened in 1942, "Willow Run" was synonymous with the American industrial effort that contributed so much to Allied victory in World War II. Operated by the Ford Motor Company, the Willow Run manufacturing plant produced a total of 8,865 B-24 Liberator heavy bombers, completed and in kit form, before closure in June 1945; Willow Run produced more Liberators than either plant owned by the plane's designer, Consolidated Aircraft.

== Overview ==
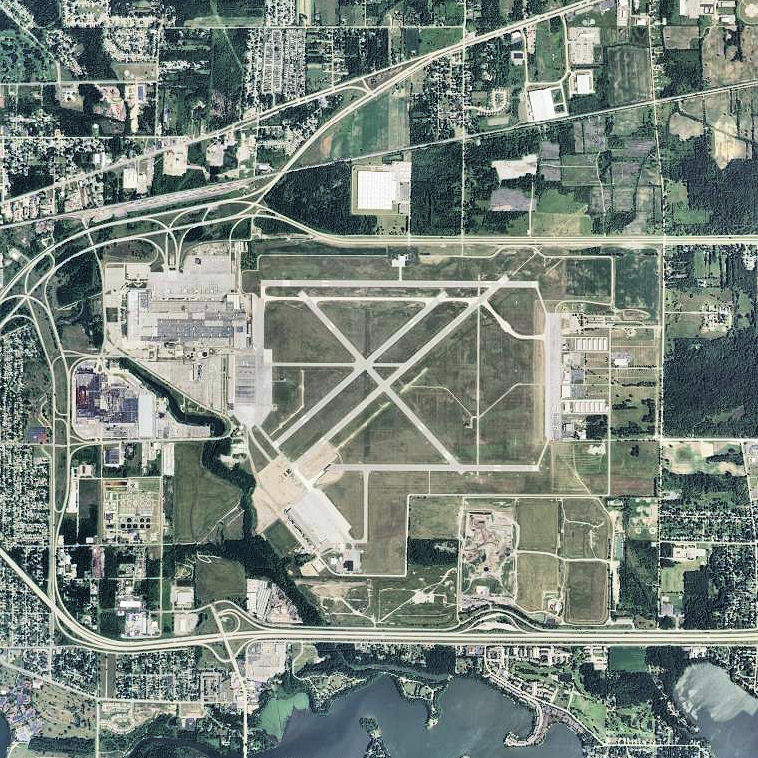
2006 USGS photo

Willow Run Airport covers 2,392 acres (968 ha) and has two runways, a continuously staffed FAA control tower, and US Customs operations. It is one of two facilities operated by the Wayne County Airport Authority, the other being Detroit Metropolitan Airport, which replaced Willow Run as the major commercial airport for the region starting in 1958. Worldwide cargo airline Kalitta Air is headquartered at the airport.

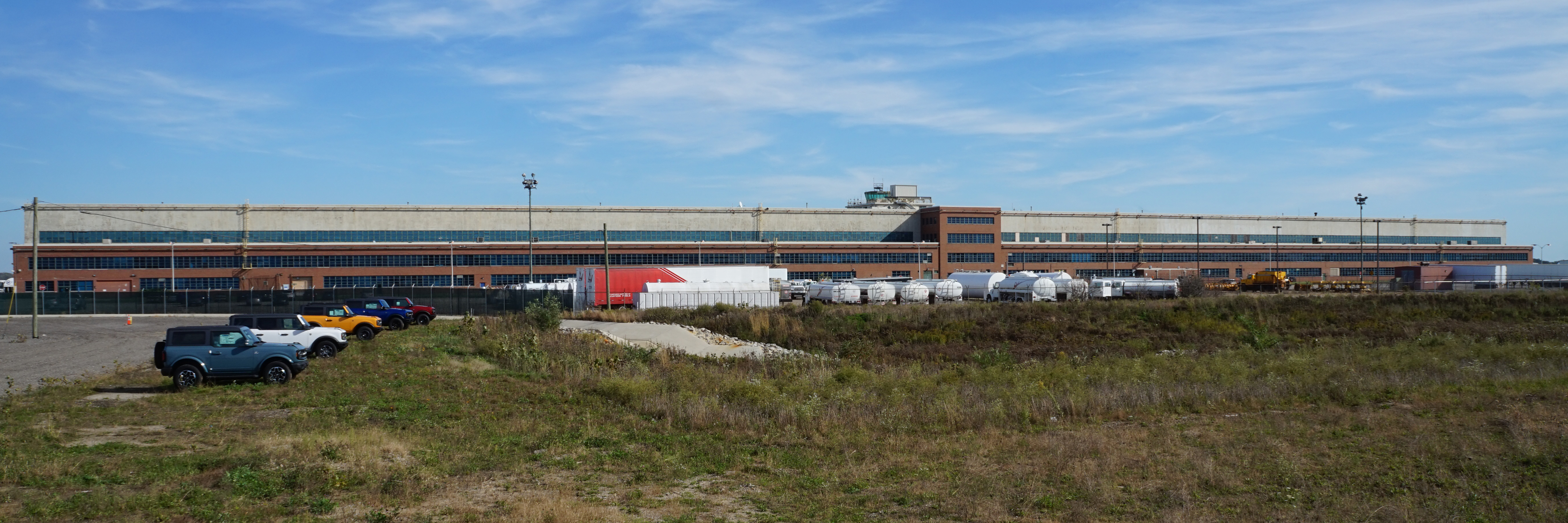
The Willow Run Airport terminal in 2021

== History ==
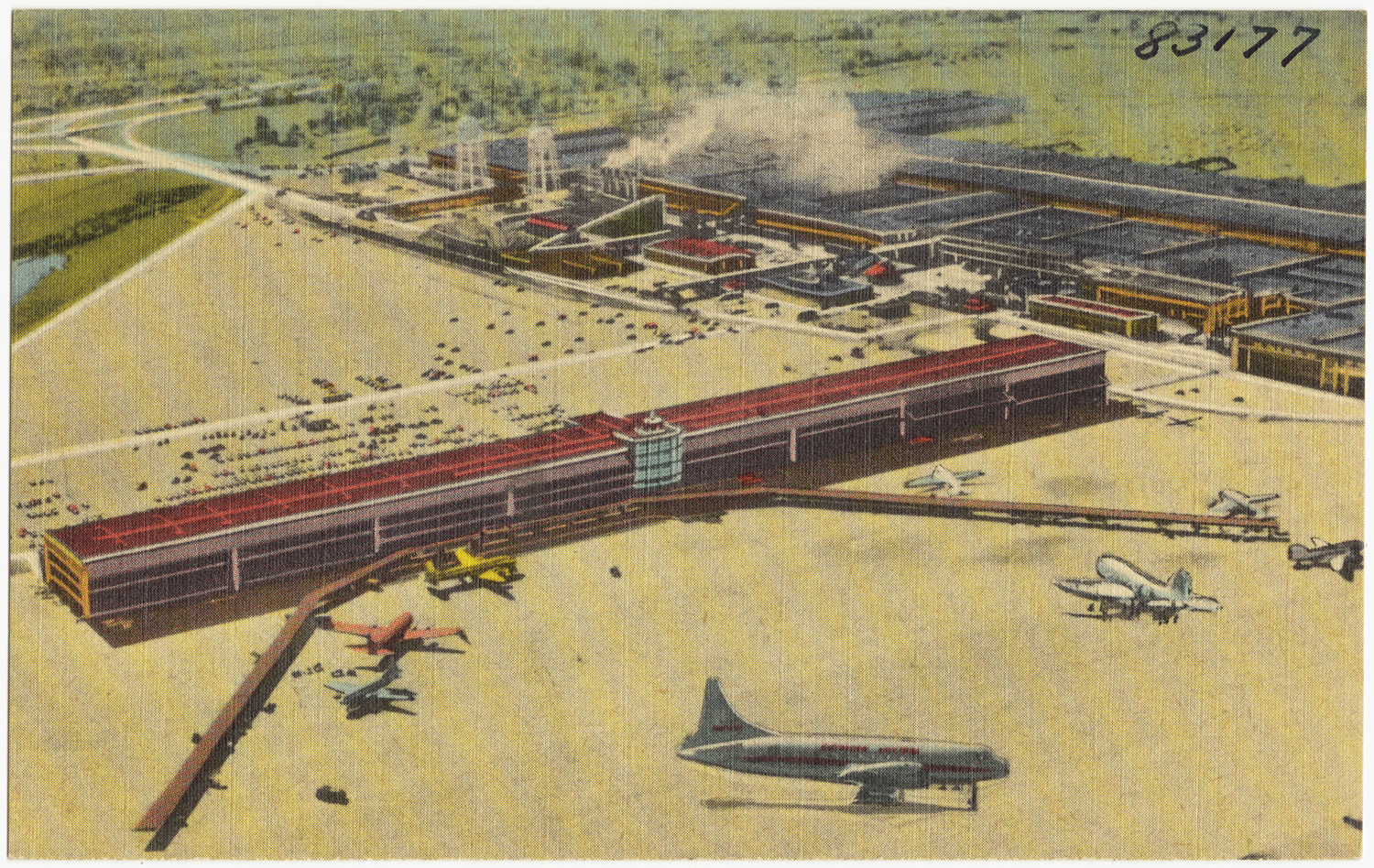
Postcard showing the Willow Run terminal, with the former bomber plant in the right background (ca. 1946–1955)

Willow Run Airport was named for a small stream that meandered through pastureland and woods until the late 1930s. Automobile pioneer Henry Ford bought the property that became the airport's runways and taxiways in 1931, and used it for almost a decade as farmland for a "social engineering" experiment that brought inner-city boys to Willow Run Farm to learn about nature, farming tasks, and the rural way of life. The residents at the Willow Run farms planted, tended, and harvested crops as well as running a maple syrup operation, and sold their products at the farm market on the property. In the process, the boys learned self-discipline and the values of hard work, and benefited from the fresh air that they had not been able to experience while growing up in congested cities.

=== World War II ===
See the Willow Run article for further details of manufacturing at the site.

The coming of World War II to Europe and the Fall of France in 1940 alarmed many in the United States, and in spite of an official policy of American neutrality, a number of government officials began preparing for the possibility of United States involvement. Henry Ford, himself an isolationist, was prevailed upon in the spring of 1941 to accept a contract to build B-24 Liberator heavy bombers for the Army Air Forces, under license from the plane's designer Consolidated Aircraft. He chose as the site his Willow Run Farm and commenced building a massive industrial plant that became the Willow Run manufacturing complex. Architect Albert Kahn designed the main structure, which had 3,500,000 sq ft (330,000 m^{2}) of factory space, and an aircraft assembly line over 1 mile (1.6 km) long. It was thought to be the largest factory under one roof anywhere in the world.

To meet projected demand for the B-24, in early 1941 the Federal government established the Liberator Production Pool Program; Ford joined the program shortly thereafter. Although the Ford Trimotor had been a success in the 1920s, the company had since shied away from aviation, and initially, Ford was assigned to provide B-24 components with final assembly performed by Consolidated at its Fort Worth plant, or by fellow licensee Douglas Aircraft at its Tulsa, Oklahoma, plant. However, in October 1941 Ford received permission from Consolidated and the Army to assemble complete Liberators on its own at its new Willow Run facility. Even then it would take nearly a year before finished Liberators left the factory.

The Willow Run plant was gigantic. It covered 65 acres (26 ha) and was almost a 0.25 miles (0.40 km) wide and 0.5 miles (0.80 km) long . The production line had a 90-degree turn at roughly its two-thirds mark; overhead views suggest this was to avoid encroaching on the airfield's taxiways, while others contend that Ford's construction managers sought to keep the plant and its equipment inside Washtenaw County, where property tax assessments were lower than neighboring Wayne County.

==== Liberator production ====
The first Ford-built Liberators rolled off the Willow Run line in September 1942; these were designated B-24E. Few if any of these saw combat, being used instead in training squadrons.

The Willow Run bomber plant had many problems at startup, due in part to the mindsets and technical skills of both management and labor, who were each accustomed to the requirements of auto production, finding it difficult at first to adapt to the higher precision required in aircraft production. The plant at Willow Run had labor problems, in particular high absentee rates and rapid employee turnover; the factory was nearly an hour's drive from Detroit, and the imposition of wartime gasoline and tire rationing had made the daily commute difficult. In one month Ford had hired 2900 workers but had lost 3100. Ford officials were as a rule anti-union, and Willow Run experienced one serious strike.

Willow Run transitioned to production of the B-24H in June 1943; these were the first Willow Run Liberators to see combat in numbers. After another year, by which time the factory had begun producing the B-24J (from April 1944), the Army determined that Consolidated's San Diego plant and Willow Run could meet future requirements for Liberators. The Boeing B-29 Superfortress was taking over the long-range bombing mission in the Pacific theater and no new B-24 units were programmed for deployment in the Europe, the Mediterranean or in the CBI, the other theatres of the war.

By fall 1944 Willow Run had moved from the B-24L to the B-24M, the last Liberator to be built in significant numbers. Willow Run shut down production in May 1945, after the end of the war in Europe; 6,972 Liberators had been built at Ford, and 1,893 sets of ‘knock-down’ kits were provided to Consolidated in Ft. Worth, TX and Douglas Aircraft in Tulsa, OK for assembly, for a total of 8,865 aircraft.

==== Army Air Forces support and post-production activities ====
At the request of the government, Ford began to decentralize operations and many parts were assembled at other Ford plants as well as by the company's sub-contractors, with the Willow Run plant concentrating on final aircraft assembly. Ford's production managers coordinated their activities with an Army Air Forces support unit, the 484th Base Headquarters and Base Squadron. The bugs were eventually worked out of the manufacturing processes, and by 1944, Ford was rolling a Liberator off the Willow Run production line every 63 minutes, 24 hours a day, 7 days a week.

After their manufacture, the next step in the process was the delivery of the aircraft to the squadrons. This was done at Willow Run by 1st Concentration Command (1st CC). The 1st CC was responsible for completing the organization and equipment of tactical and combat bombardment squadrons prior to their deployment to the overseas combat theaters. It would also provide a final inspection of the aircraft and make any appropriate final changes; i.e., install long-range fuel tanks, remove unnecessary equipment, and give it a final flight safety test.

While the planes were being serviced and made ready for overseas movement, personnel for these planes were also being processed. Pilots, co-pilots, navigators and crew chiefs were assigned as a crew for each aircraft. Paperwork was handled, necessary specific B-24 life support equipment was issued and some technical training for supporting the aircraft accomplished.

Once production began, it became difficult to introduce changes dictated by field experience in the various overseas theaters onto the production line in a timely fashion. Consequently, newly constructed Liberators needed modifications for the specific geographic areas they were to be flown in combat. For this reason, a series of Air Technical Service Command modification centers were established for the incorporation of these required theater changes into new Liberators following their manufacture and assignments. There were seven known modification centers: Consolidated/Fort Worth; Oklahoma City Air Materiel Center at Tinker Field, Tucson Modification Center at Davis-Monthan Field; the Birmingham Depot in Alabama; the Northwest Airlines Depot in Minneapolis, Minnesota; the, Martin-Omaha manufacturing plant, and the Hawaiian Air Depot at Hickam Field.

==== Ownership changes ====
Although the airfield itself and the buildings to the east of the runways had been built on Henry Ford's personal property, it is unclear how the parcels across the county line that became the site of the bomber plant were assembled. In any event, Henry Ford (who, although technically retired from Ford Motor operations until his son Edsel's death from undulant fever in 1943, still held a say in company affairs) had insisted on building the factory without government financing. Instead, the company built the factory, and sold it to the Reconstruction Finance Corporation's Defense Plant Corporation (RFC-DPC), which then leased it back to Ford for the duration of the war. The land which held the airfield was transferred from Henry Ford's control to that of the company in July 1944, and sold to the RFC-DPC shortly thereafter.

=== Postwar history ===
See also Willow Run Transmission and Willow Run Assembly.

==== Willow Run as Detroit's commercial airport ====
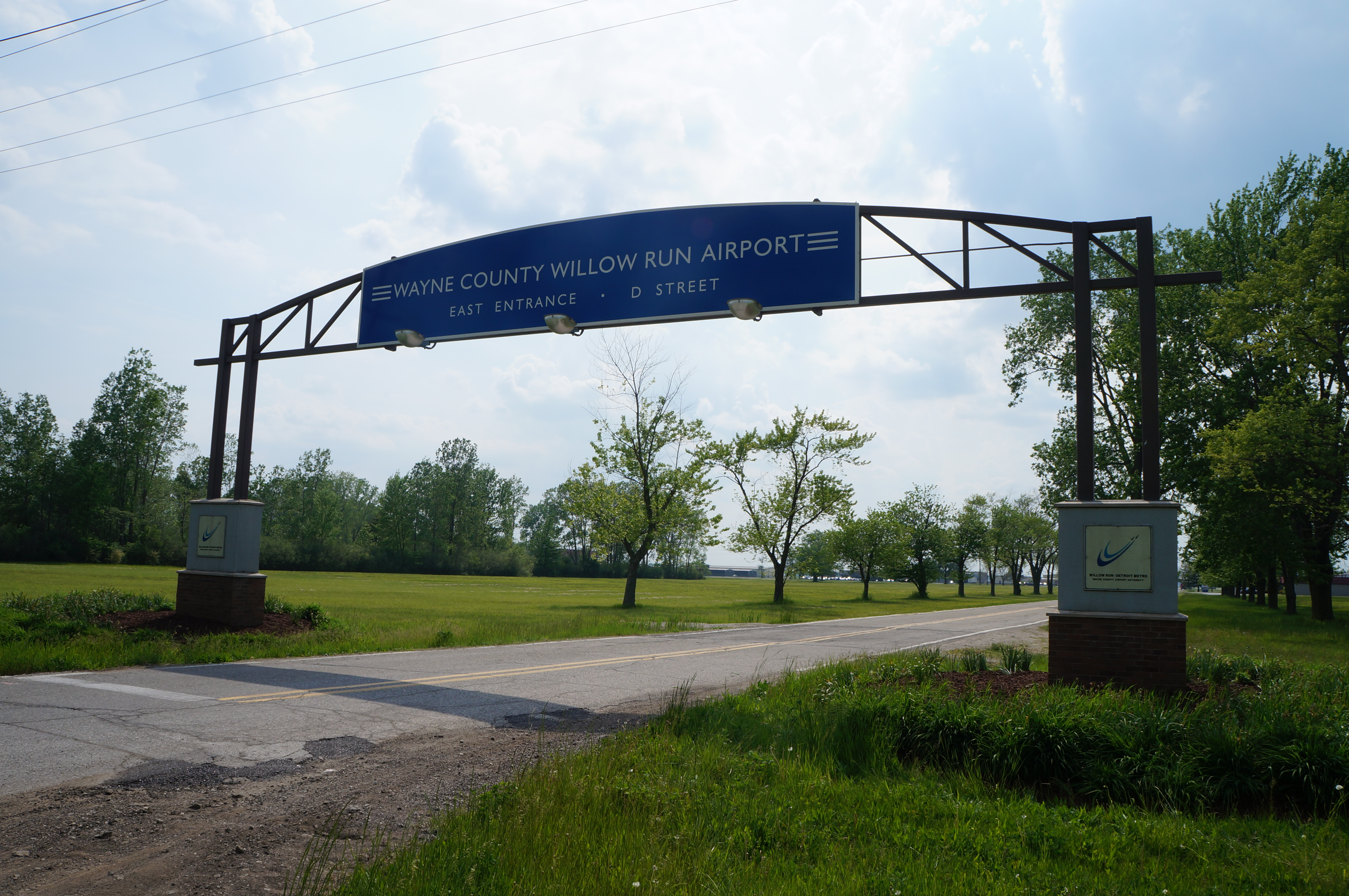
Van Buren Township entrance

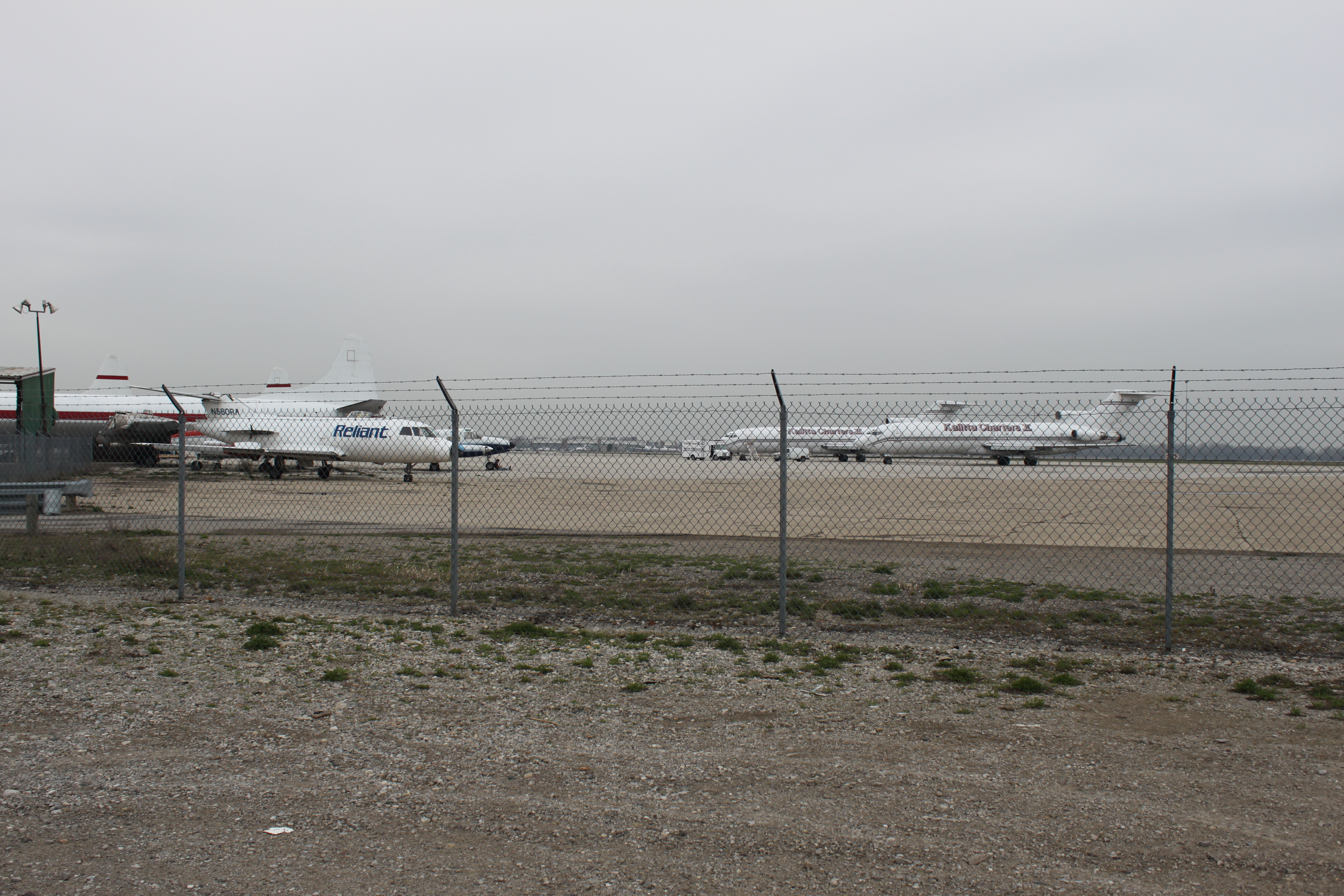
Planes on apron at Willow Run near Hangar 1 (2010)

Between 1946 and 1947, passenger airlines serving Detroit moved from Detroit City Airport on the city's crowded east side, to Willow Run; shortly thereafter, Wayne County officials began expanding Detroit-Wayne Major Airport at Romulus, which was 10 miles (16 km) closer to Detroit than Willow Run.

Willow Run's relative isolation encouraged new approaches to passenger transportation to and from airports; at Willow Run in 1946, Warren Avis founded Avis Airlines Rent a Car Systems, the first rental car operation at an airport.

The RFC sold the airport to the University of Michigan in 1947 for $1.00. The terms of the sale required that the university operate the airport as a research facility, and the Michigan Aeronautical Research Center (later renamed Willow Run Research Center) took over some of the airport's buildings that were not needed for commercial aviation operations. For a time, the university housed some of its students in the apartments previously used by plant workers. Many of the buildings at the airport were used by University of Michigan physicists and engineers in research for national defense, including early work in antiballistic missile defense and remote sensing, at a facility which would become the Environmental Research Institute of Michigan (ERIM) after separating from the university in 1972.

At about the same time it sold the airfield, the RFC leased (and later sold) the bomber plant to the Kaiser-Frazer automobile company; the factory eventually became owned by General Motors. The last GM operations at Willow Run ended in 2010, and that property is planned for redevelopment after 2013 by its owner the RACER Trust. Since April 2013, there has been an effort underway by preservationists to save a small portion of the original bomber plant facility, adjacent to the airport, as a new home for nearby Yankee Air Museum. The campaign is called SaveTheBomberPlant.org and is centered on a website of the same name.

In 1951, the United States Air Force exercised a right of return to Willow Run and established Willow Run Air Force Station to the east of the airport runway. Willow Run AFS closed in 1959.

==== Decline of Willow Run ====
Almost all of Detroit's scheduled airline flights used Willow Run until 1958, when the coming of the Jet Age drove traffic to the Romulus airfield, which that year had been renamed Detroit Metropolitan Wayne County Airport (the name it still bears). It offered carriers a new terminal designed for the new aircraft, a newly expanded runway layout, and approach controls that made it the first inland airport in the country certified for jet airliners.

In 1956, there were seven passenger airlines at Willow Run. The April 1957 Official Airline Guide shows 68 weekday departures on Capital, 45 on American, 23 on Eastern, 17 on Northwest Orient, 14 on United, 13 on North Central, 13 on TWA, 8 on Delta, 5 on Allegheny and 3 on Mohawk. American's only westward non-stops were to Chicago; United had a nonstop DC-7 to Los Angeles; come summer TWA would resume its weekly two-stop Constellation flight to Paris via Gander in Newfoundland and Shannon in Ireland. Only BOAC and Pan Am flew out of Detroit-Wayne Major.

American Airlines moved from Willow Run to Detroit-Metropolitan in October 1958, followed by Northwest, Allegheny, and Delta in the next few months. Capital Airlines merged into United in 1961 and Lake Central Airlines began new service in 1962.

Airline flights ended in 1966 when United, TWA, Eastern, North Central, Mohawk and Lake Central moved to Metro Airport. In 1968, upon hearing that Detroit Tigers fans had overwhelmed Metro Airport in order to greet the newly crowned world champions, the jet carrying the team diverted to Willow Run instead.

USA Jet, a charter airline, briefly brought flights back to Willow Run, on DC-9s and MD-82s.

==== The airport today ====
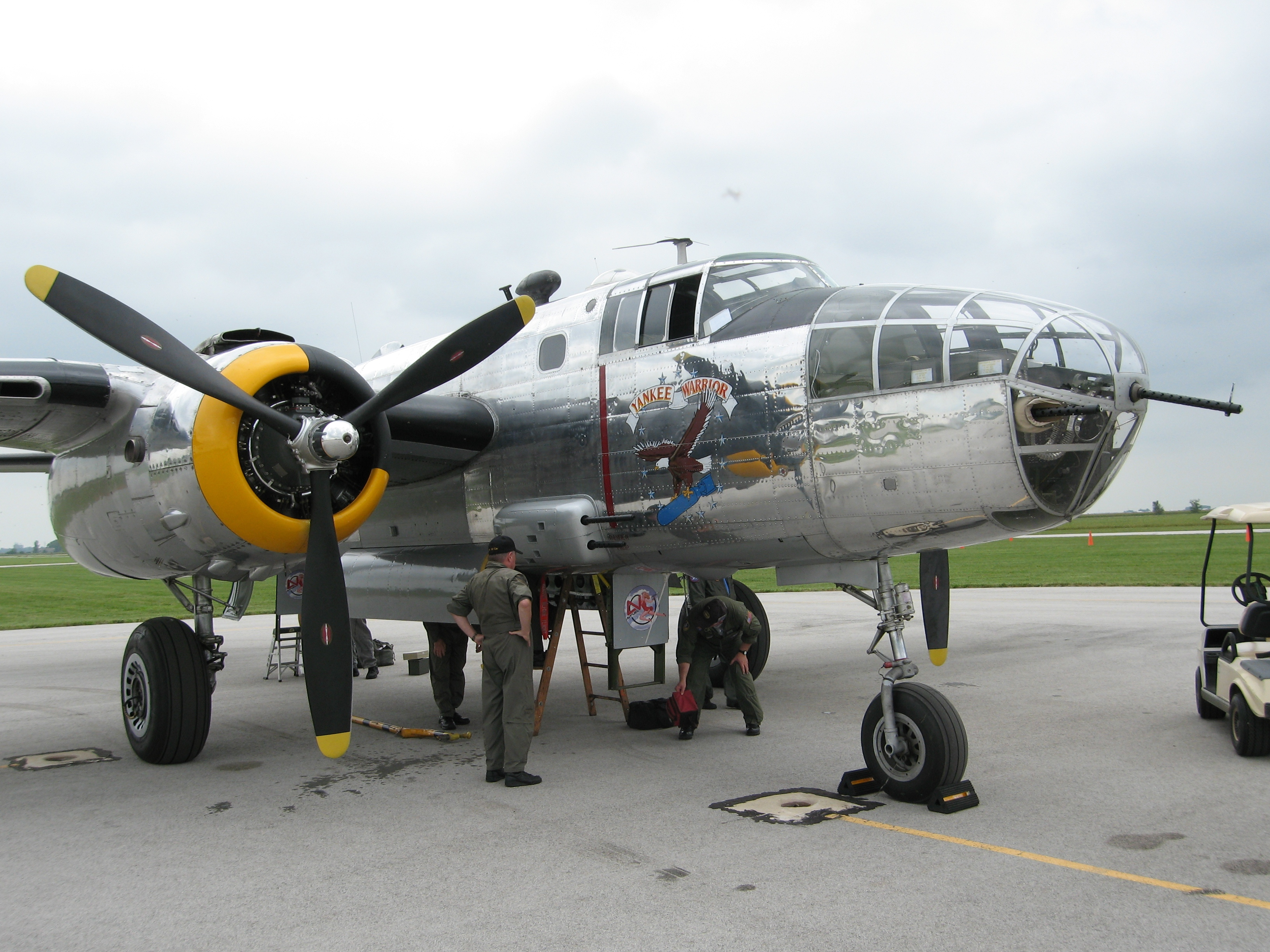
Yankee Warrior, a fully operational B-25 Mitchell, is operated by the Yankee Air Museum.

In 2002, with the creation of the Wayne County Airport Authority by the state legislature, the license to operate the airport was transferred from the general county government to the new independent authority.

The Yankee Air Museum opened on the airport grounds in 1981. A fire in October 2004 destroyed the museum's building and most of its artifacts. The static display aircraft, including a B-52 Stratofortress and other aircraft too large for display inside the hangar, were undamaged. In 2005 the museum moved to the other side of the airport, where they began to rebuild their displays and gather more World War II memorabilia. In 2013, the museum purchased a section of the former bomber plant, which is now used for its large aircraft acquisitions.

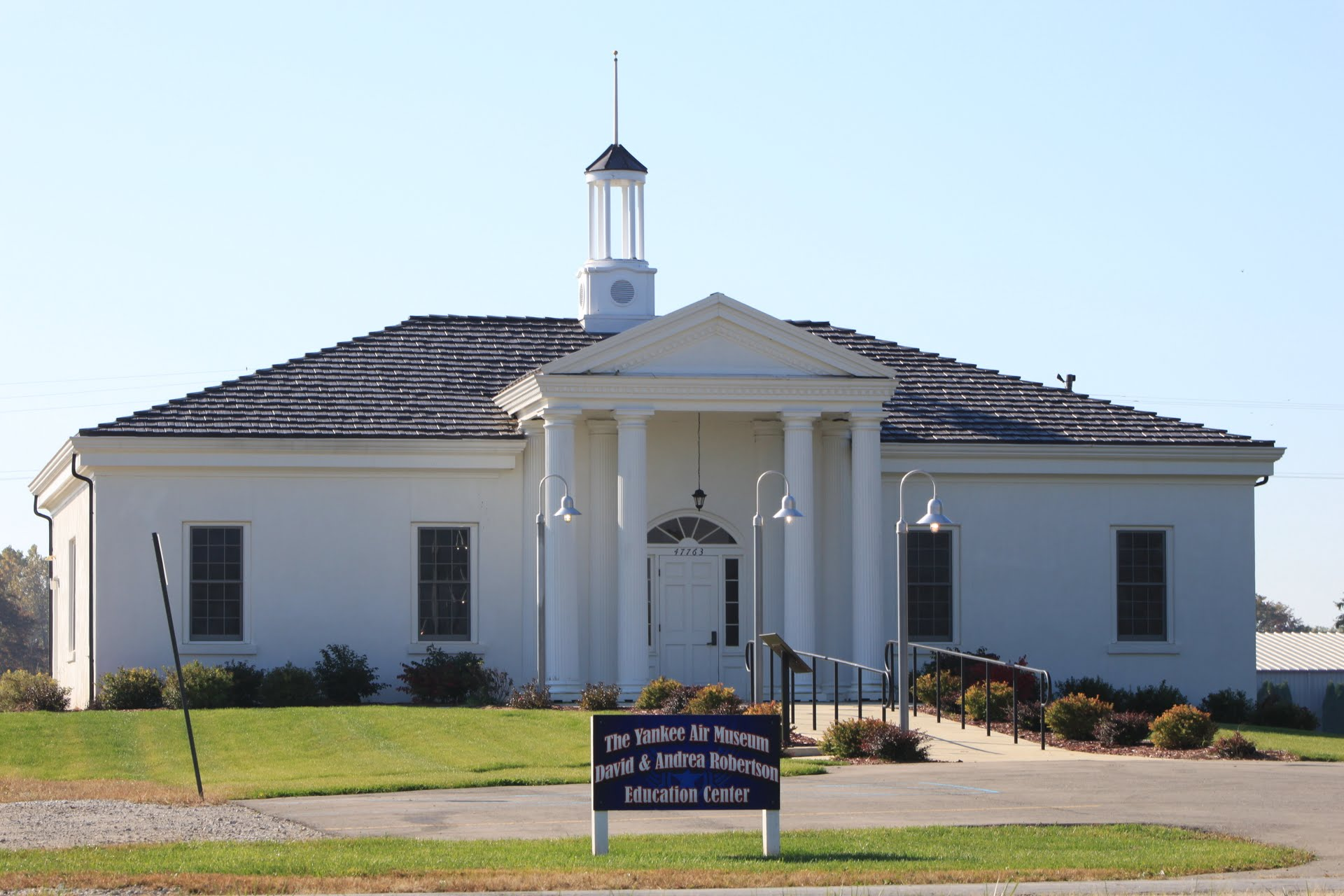
Yankee Air Force Education Center

The Yankee Air Museum hosts semi-annual airshows over Willow Run, featuring the Blue Angels.

Between July and September 2009, what was Runway 9R/27L along the southern edge of the airfield was converted to Taxiway H. This allowed the redesign of the southwest end of Runway 5R to reduce the possibility of encroachment by taxiing aircraft.

In 2011, Michigan State University planted 3 acres (1.2 ha) of canola and mustard seed on airport property to generate biofuels for aircraft use. The airport has 814 acres (329 ha) available for future crop production.

Until 2015, the airport was home to the sole aircraft of Baltia Airlines, an airline that has been attempting to commence operations to St. Petersburg since 1991. The aircraft was a Boeing 747-200 with registration N706BL (msn 21705).

On March 8, 2017, Ameristar Charters Flight 9363, a charter flight carrying the Michigan Wolverines men's basketball team to the Big Ten Conference men's basketball Tournament, abandoned takeoff and skidded off the runway in high winds. The plane suffered extensive damage and some of the players suffered minor injuries but no serious injuries or fatalities were reported. The team arrived late and initially had to play in practice gear (their regular uniforms, like all other luggage, had to remain on the plane as part of the NTSB investigation) but went on to win the tournament.

In December 2017, the American Center for Mobility opened their autonomous vehicle proving ground, Technology Park, at the airport. The center's test tracks utilize a vacated 2.5-mile portion of the former Willow Run Expressway, including its two double overpasses.

As of May 2024, the Wayne County Airport Authority has closed down Hangar 1 for demolition, which would later become part of the Tech Park for the American Center for Mobility, although the start of demolition is unknown.

=== ICE deportation flights ===
United States Immigration and Customs Enforcement (ICE) charter flights began operating out of Willow Run Airport near Ypsilanti, Michigan in mid-2025, frequently transporting immigration detainees to major detention hubs in the southern United States, such as Alexandria, Louisiana, and Texas locations, according to flight tracking data from the ICE Flight Monitor project by Human Rights First. These operations involved private carriers including Key Lime Air and Eastern Air Express, and records show there were 88 outbound ICE flights from Willow Run in 2025. The Wayne County Airport Authority, which manages the airport, stated it does not hold direct contracts with ICE and that it does not control agreements between airlines and federal agencies, as long as they meet legal and safety requirements.

== Accidents and incidents ==
- On January 14, 1965, a Lockheed Model 18 Lodestar operated by the Burroughs Corporation on a training flight crashed on approach 600 meters beyond the end of the runway and nearly 300 meters left because a right flap or aileron cable failed during flap retraction. Both occupants died.
- On February 21, 1973, a Learjet 24 operated by Air Taxis Inc landed long at YIP, overran the runway, hit a localizer antenna and the instrument landing system (ILS) building. The pilot attempted a go-around but failed to stow the spoilers, causing the accident. Two out of the three occupants died.
- On June 8, 1993, a Beech E18S impacted terrain after takeoff from Willow Run. Witnesses report there was no indication of an engine fire or failure but that it sounded like the pilot was "on the throttles." The probable cause was found to be the pilot's inadequate preflight preparation, which caused him to turn off the attitude indicator and become disoriented in fog and low clouds.
- On December 22, 2003, a Sikorsky S-58JT helicopter was destroyed when it impacted light poles and the ground during landing at the Willow Run Airport. The pilot reported that, at approximately 40 knots airspeed and 70 feet above the ground, "there was an abrupt boom and pitch of the aircraft followed by a right forward rapid descent with a very large horizontal one-to-one out of balance oscillation." Though the pilot attempted to apply all available collective pitch, the aircraft impacted the ground, rolled, and flipped over. The probable cause was found to be pilot disorientation, causing him to attempt to land on the wrong ramp and therefore impact light poles while on approach.
- On May 19, 2005, a Piper PA-32 collided with a taxiway sign during its landing roll at Willow Run Airport. The pilot reported he applied right rudder and left rudder in his landing flare to compensate for a crosswind, and while he touched down on centerline, the airplane began drifting to the right as the nosewheel touched down despite the crosswind inputs. Then, the pilot applied full left rudder to compensate, but the aircraft veered off the runway. The reason for the pilot's loss of directional control could not be determined.
- On March 8, 2017, a McDonnell-Douglas MD-83 operating for Ameristar Air Cargo overran the departure end of Runway 23L during a rejected takeoff at Willow Run. The aircraft was operating as an on-demand charter flight destined for Washington Dulles International Airport. The probable cause of the accident was found to be the jammed condition of the airplane's right elevator, which resulted from exposure to localized, dynamic wind while the airplane was parked and rendered the airplane unable to rotate during takeoff.
- On August 13, 2023, a Mikoyan-Gurevich MiG-23 fighter jet crashed near the airport during the Thunder Over Michigan air show. The pilots ejected from the aircraft prior to the crash and had to be recovered from Belleville Lake.

== See also ==
- List of airports in Michigan
- Detroit Region Aerotropolis
- Michigan World War II Army Airfields
- Eastern Air Defense Force (Air Defense Command)
- 30th Air Division
