= Detroit Region Aerotropolis =

American economic development partnership

The Detroit Region Aerotropolis (also referred to as the DRA, Detroit Aerotropolis or Michigan Aerotropolis) is a four-community, two-county public-private economic development partnership focused on driving corporate expansion and new investments around Wayne County Airport Authority's airports: Detroit Metropolitan Airport and Willow Run Airport. The Detroit Region Aerotropolis promotes greenfield expansion in Southeast Michigan, offering development-ready land centered in an expansive network of transportation infrastructure including two airports, three major interstates, five Class-A rail lines, and the American Center for Mobility.

Located just 10 miles (16 km) apart and situated along Interstate 94 (I-94), this dual-airport system is unique in terms of other aerotropolis-oriented developments around the world. Its 6,000 acres of development-ready land between and surrounding the airports along with excess runway capacity at the airports are among primary drivers behind the partnership. Other factors such as the location of a major international border crossing with Canada (Windsor, Ontario) to the east, mature road and rail infrastructure, and the area's major academic institutions have all driven the idea of taking advantage of the airports for the region's overall economic benefit.

== Current partnerships ==
As of 2022, the Detroit Region Aerotropolis is partnered with the following communities:

- Washtenaw County
- Wayne County
- City of Romulus
- City of Taylor
- Huron Charter Township
- Van Buren Charter Township

The DRA's economic development partners include:

- Wayne County Airport Authority
- DTE Energy
- Ann Arbor SPARK
- Southeast Michigan Community Alliance
- Michigan Economic Development Corporation
- Wayne County Economic Development Corporation]
- Detroit Regional Partnership
- Detroit Regional Chamber
- AHK USA
- British American Business Council
- Michigan Defense Center
- Washtenaw County Michigan Works!
- French American Chamber of Commerce

Private sector partners include:

- Ashley Capital
- NorthPoint Development
- Hillwood A Perot Company
- Sterling Group

== History ==
The discussion of developing an aerotropolis around Detroit Metropolitan Airport and Willow Run Airport dates back to the 1980s when Northwest Airlines helped make Detroit Metropolitan Airport a major hub for passenger travel. The aerotropolis concept was then advanced under the administration of Wayne County Chief Executive Edward H. McNamara who played a critical role in the expansion and upgrade of Detroit Metro's infrastructure and terminals. At the same time, Willow Run Airport, once the primary location for the manufacturing of B-24 bombers during World War II, grew to be one of the busiest on-demand cargo airports in North America, serving the needs of the automotive industry.

In 2002 both airports were spun off from Wayne County control and placed under the current Wayne County Airport Authority. Following the retirement of Wayne County Executive Edward H. McNamara, the aerotropolis project became a key initiative of the administration of Wayne County Executive Robert A. Ficano.

Realizing that a project of such scope required strong input from the local governments near the airports, Wayne County began to engage the seven municipal governments in close proximity to the airports including two in neighboring Washtenaw County. Ten government entities along with the Wayne County Airport Authority signed a non-binding memorandum of understanding to explore the aerotropolis concept in the middle of 2006. Ficano then recruited the support of the nonprofit group Detroit Renaissance whose board is composed of the Detroit region's leading private CEOs.

In 2007, a 28-member public-private Aerotropolis Task Force was formed that included elected government officials, and private sector leaders.

The Aerotropolis Task Force along with Detroit Renaissance and the Wayne County Airport Authority lead the aerotropolis initiative along with Washtenaw County, Wayne County, the cities of Romulus, Taylor, Ypsilanti, and Belleville, and the townships of Huron, Van Buren and Ypsilanti. In May 2009, the seven local governments and Washtenaw County signed an intergovernmental agreement to create a development corporation to advance the project on a regional level.

=== VantagePort: Aerotropolis rebranded ===
On July 18, 2013, Tim Keyes, former director of economic development for the city of Romulus, MI was announced as CEO by the Detroit Region Aerotropolis Development Corp. In addition, the ADC in working with a rebranding management firm has re-crafted the image and changed the nameplate of "Aerotropolis" to "VantagePort".

In this role, Keyes helped drive the development of the area around and corridor between Detroit Metropolitan Airport and the Willow Run Airport into an advanced hub of logistics, transportation, business and manufacturing. The Detroit Aerotropolis was slow to gain traction over those years. Troubled by the economic crisis of 2008 and its carryover effects and clouded by the bankruptcy of the City of Detroit, the hiring of Keyes and the rollout of VantagePort was hoped to signify a renewed energy and commitment to this regional development project.

=== Detroit Region Aerotropolis: VantagePort re-rebranded ===
In 2016, the executive committee and corporate board decided that the name VantagePort did not truly represent the region, and to switch back to Detroit Region Aerotropolis.

== Developments ==
On June 26, 2009, General Electric CEO Jeff Immelt announced plans for a new Advanced Manufacturing and Software Technology Center to be located in Van Buren Township in the heart of the Detroit Region Aerotropolis. The facility was expected to bring approximately to 1,200 jobs to the region, and was constructed in Visteon Village home to the Visteon Corporation, ironically in Chapter 11 at the time of the announcement. GE's plans included leasing current office space as well as construction of a new $100 million, 100,000-square-foot (9,300 m^{2}) research and development facility to house GE engineers who will focus on advanced manufacturing for alternative energy as well as aircraft engine and gas turbine technologies. The software center will develop applications to support GE business systems and advanced technology groups. It will also be a training hub for GE IT personnel from around the world.

Appearing before the Detroit Economic Club, Immelt was joined by Michigan Governor Jennifer Granholm, Sen. Carl Levin, and Sen. Debbie Stabenow. Together they hailed the GE announcement as not only important in the development of a new technology future for the US but also important in Michigan's "comeback", a state hit the hardest by the downfall of the automotive manufacturing sector. As Granholm stated, "For a hundred years, we have been an automotive economy and we clearly need to diversify. This summer is going to be tough. But if we are shrewd and strategic and make key investments, we will emerge leaner, meaner, stronger and greener." Wayne County Executive Robert Ficano saw the arrival of GE as integral in the development of the Detroit Region Aerotropolis, likening it to the impact of Hewlett-Packard on Silicon Valley. As Immelt stated, "Companies like GE never travel alone," Immelt said. "We tend to bring suppliers and other people with us. At the end of the day, it could equal another couple of thousand jobs.".

In 2013, GE announced that it would add 300 more employees at the complex within two years.

=== Projects Bring Focus on Aerotropolis as Transit and Logistics Hub ===
Wayne County Executive Warren C. Evans, who was elected in 2014 to succeed Ficano, eliminated the county's Department of Economic Development Growth Engine. Evans, however, decided to keep Aerotropolis functional despite restructuring efforts by the county to address structural and budget deficits totaling more than $120 million.

Under Evans, several projects brought renewed attention to Aerotropolis as a transit hub in 2017 . An Amazon fulfillment center, Penske logistics operation, and Brose manufacturing facility were started in the district and expected to create 2,300 new jobs and about $350 million in investment.

In September 2020, Kroger announced plans for a $95 million fulfillment center in Romulus, which was expected to create 250 jobs, and aimed to capitalize on the growing online grocery segment. The 135,000-square-foot facility will be built on 22-acre site as part of the Detroit Region Aerotropolis.

In July 2021, Ford Motor Company announced that Romulus, Michigan would be the home of its new global battery center – Ford Ion Park – which is accelerating the company’s research and development of battery and battery cell technology – including future battery manufacturing. The new collaborative learning lab represents $100 million of Ford’s $185 million investment in developing, testing, and building vehicle battery cells and cell arrays. Ion Park will house some 200 engineers, researchers and other workers. Employees there will research and test battery technologies and pilot advanced manufacturing techniques to help Ford boost battery cell volumes, improve battery range and reduce costs.

=== Highways in the Sky: Developments in Advanced Air Mobility ===
The proliferation of drone technology and e-commerce, have accelerated Aerotropolis' effort to build highways in the sky, which are a system of low-altitude flight routes at between 40 and 400 feet where lightweight air vehicles would fly, carrying everything from Amazon purchases to automotive parts.

In January 2020, the Detroit Aerotropolis licensed the Airspace Link AirHub platform, in partnership with Michigan’s PlanetM and the Michigan Unmanned Aerial Systems Consortium, to establish and test a new low-altitude drone infrastructure in the region and bring new advanced manufacturing prospects to the region.

Aerotropolis has since deployed the Airspace Link low-altitude drone infrastructure to its local communities and airports to support the safe use of recreational and commercial drone use. These capabilities provide a new type of Smart City mobility infrastructure supporting the growth of drone operations, drone service providers, drone manufacturing, package delivery and air taxi in the future. The complete AirHub platform, including AirHub for Pilots and AirHub for Government, was developed and implemented for all four Aerotropolis communities.

Data from the communities, county, state, local and commercial sources were collected, processed and analyzed to identify relevant hazards and risks associated with UAS operations occurring within Aerotropolis used for building safe “Highways in the Sky” that are in harmony with Aerotropolis community interests.

Aerotropolis continues to collaborate with Airspace Link to test drone flight and delivery. On August 19, 2021, it held one of several demonstration events, "Flying the Fairways for Drone Delivery" at Taylor Golf Club which included delivering lunch to the 10th hole. The Aerotropolis community also came together to demonstrate advanced air mobility at the City of Taylor Beaumont Hospital on June 13, 2022. The demonstration included Airspace Link, Mission GO, MEDC, Michigan Office of Future Mobility and Electrification, Taylor Beaumont Hospital, Detroit Region Aerotropolis, Wayne County, City of Taylor and others. The drone delivery operation utilized Aerotropolis’s Low Altitude Authorization and Notification Capability to demonstrate the medical and economic efficiencies to be realized with advanced low-altitude airspace operations.

=== American Center for Mobility ===
The American Center for Mobility is part of the infrastructure in Aerotropolis and is a purpose-built facility designed for research, education, testing, standards convening, product development, validation and self-certification for connected and automated technologies as well as future mobility. It is located on more than 500 acres (200 ha) in Ypsilanti Township near the Willow Run airport. The Center began testing in December 2017 and officially opened in April 2018. The ACM was awarded a federal designation as a proving ground for the development of driverless cars. Testing can occur during all four seasons, day and night, in all weather conditions. It is a joint initiative with the State of Michigan founded in partnership with the Michigan Department of Transportation, the Michigan Economic Development Corporation, the University of Michigan, Business Leaders for Michigan, and Ann Arbor SPARK.

=== Executive director position created ===
The Detroit Region Aerotropolis Development Corp. named Robert Luce, formerly from MICHauto, as its new executive director.

Luce began his post March 6 to oversee the economic development agency's day-to-day operations reporting to the board of directors. He is the first person to take on this role for the agency, which was managed by Wayne County or a part-time consultant since its inception.

Luce was succeeded by Christopher J. Girdwood in December 2019. He previously served as the business development manager for Prince William County in Virginia, where he implemented strategies to grow a 1,500-acre Innovation Park by attracting and expanding life science and advanced manufacturing industries.
