= Michigan Flight Museum =

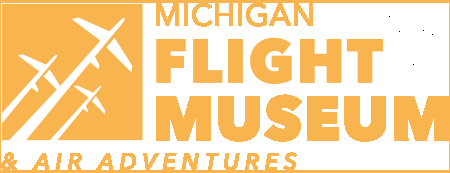

- Location within Michigan
- Former name: Yankee Air Museum
- Established: 1981
- Location: Willow Run Airport; Ypsilanti Township, Michigan, United States
- Coordinates: 42.23903°N 83.50808°W
- Type: Aviation museum
- Founder: Dennis E. Norton
- Director: Kevin Walsh
- Curator: Julie Osborne
- Website: miflightmuseum.org

The Michigan Flight Museum, formerly known as the Yankee Air Museum, is an aviation museum located at Willow Run Airport, and in Ypsilanti Township, Michigan. The museum has a small fleet of flying aircraft and a collection of static display aircraft outdoors.

== History ==
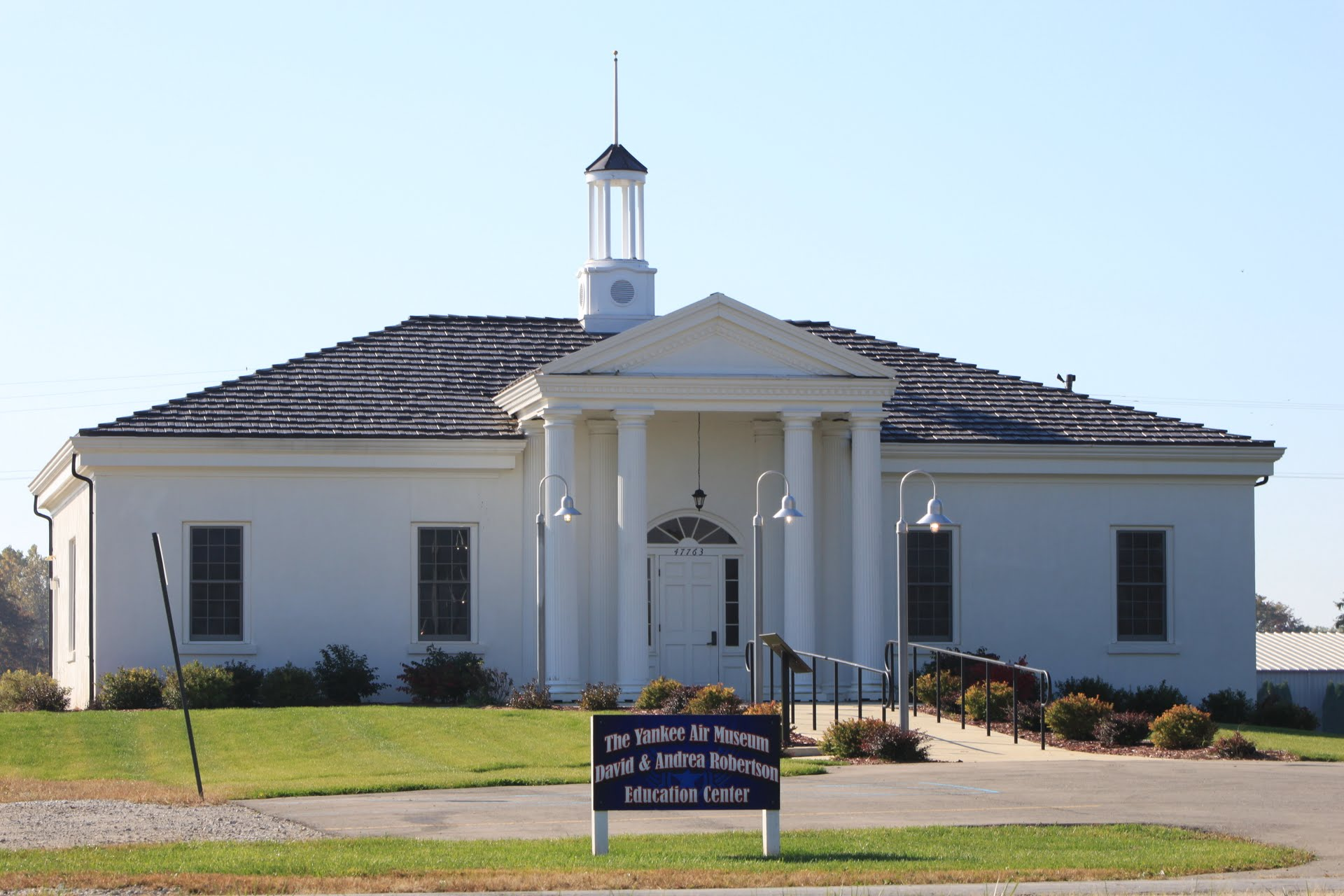
Yankee Air Force Education Center

The Yankee Air Force Inc. was founded in 1981 to pursue these goals:

- To preserve a part of Michigan's extensive aviation history.
- To acquire one of the original USAAF hangars and restore it to its original condition.
- To obtain a B-24 Liberator built at the Ford Willow Run plant, site of the museum.

The Yankee Air Force previously operated four divisions in addition to its home base:

- Saginaw Valley at Saginaw County H.W. Browne Airport in Michigan
- Wurtsmith Division at Wurtsmith Air Force Base in Michigan
- Northeast Division at Essex County Airport in New Jersey
- Florida Division in Florida

=== 2004 fire ===
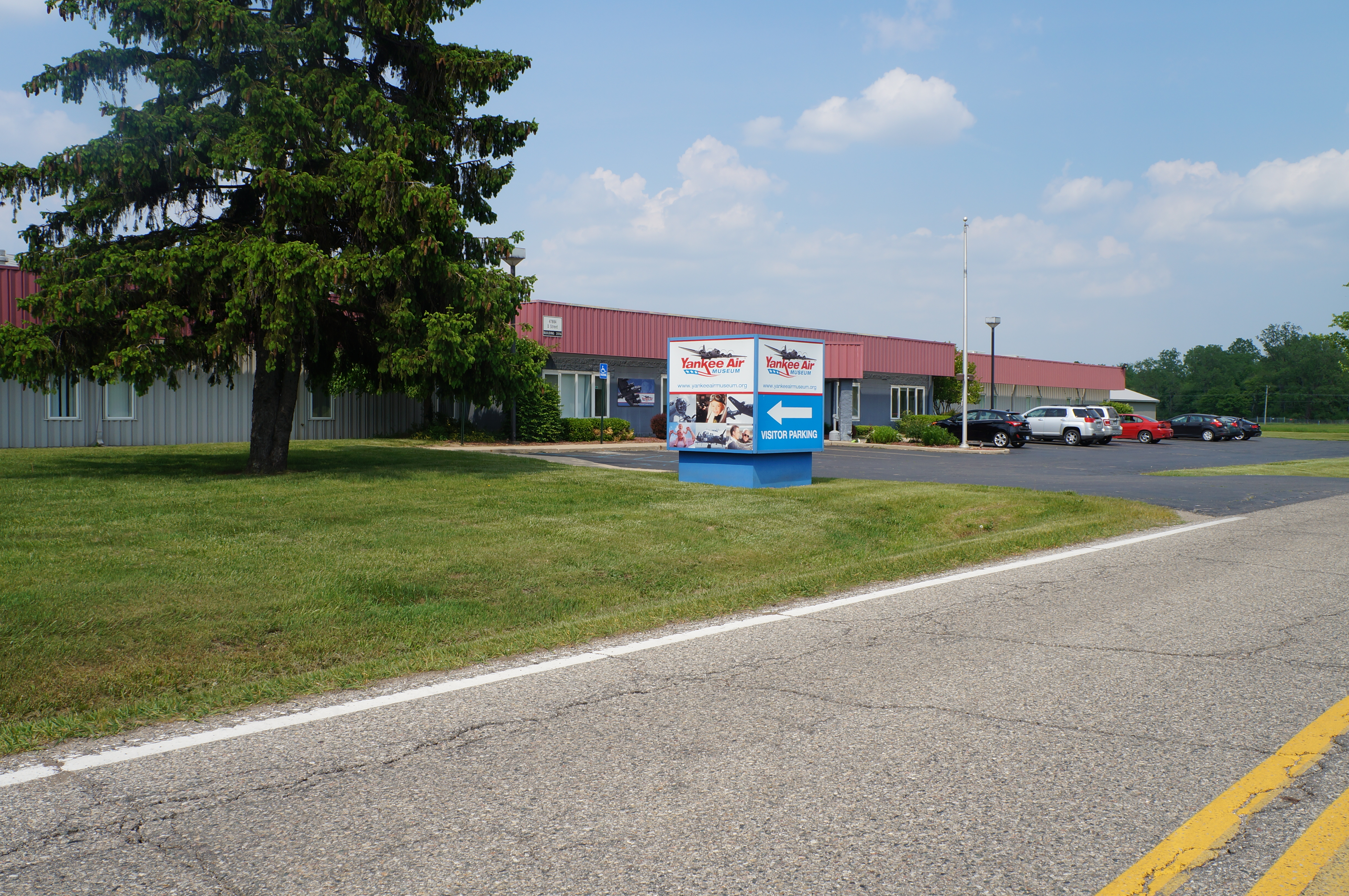
Yankee Air Force Museum, Side Entrance

On the night of October 9, 2004, the Yankee Air Museum's hangar on the northeast side of Willow Run Airport (KYIP) burned down. The B-17, B-25 and C-47 were saved through heroic efforts by museum volunteers. The Stinson was at another hangar. Everything else inside the hangar was destroyed, including the original prototype North American YOV-10A Bronco, Waco CG-4A Glider, a former Thunderbirds Republic F-105, Aero L-39, Link Trainer, artifacts, spare parts, tools, and the museum's library.

Rebuilding plans were underway within days and the museum's fundraising arm, the Michigan Aerospace Foundation, worked to replace the lost facility with a new, bigger, state-of-the-art aviation museum and aerospace facility. Ground was broken for a new museum building in April 2007. In 2008, the museum changed from a membership club to a director-driven organization with an 11-member board.

In 2009, the museum purchased a building from the Michigan Institute of Aviation and Technology (MIAT), on D Street to the east of the airfield, intending it as the new home of the museum collection.

In summer 2010, the museum opened the David and Andrea Robertson Education Center in a 1938 schoolhouse that had been moved from another part of the Willow Run complex. This had been the officers' club for the USAAF detachments stationed at Willow Run during the war, and was apparently the schoolhouse for the boys living at Henry Ford's Willow Run Farm (a social experiment that used the Willow Run site in 1939 and 1940 before the airfield and industrial complex were ever conceived).

The museum reopened to the public on October 10, 2010, six years to the day after the fire. This allowed the museum to vacate Hangar Two, which was condemned by the Wayne County Airport Authority.

The museum became a Smithsonian Affiliate in July 2011.

=== Move to Willow Run bomber plant ===
Former logo

In April 2013, Yankee Air Museum and RACER Trust, owner of the former General Motors Willow Run plant, announced a plan for Yankee Air Museum to acquire a 175,000-square-foot (16,300 m^{2}) portion of the factory, contingent upon the museum raising the funds necessary to preserve and secure their proposed portion of the facility. The museum would consolidate operations scattered on various parcels at Willow Run Airport into the 1941 landmark, designed by Albert Kahn, with the trust seeking to clear the remainder of the plant for redevelopment. The plant was used during World War II to manufacture B-24 bombers.

The campaign to save a portion of Willow Run for the Yankee Air Museum is called SaveTheBomberPlant.org, and is centered on a fundraising website by the same name.

After extending the fundraising deadline to Oct. 1, and then to Nov. 1, 2013, on October 26, 2013, RACER Trust and the Yankee Air Museum again reached a new, and final, deadline extension agreement. The final deadline to raise the funds necessary to preserve a portion of the Willow Run plant for the Yankee Air Museum was May 1, 2014.

At the time of the May 1, 2014 deadline, the Yankee Air Museum had raised over $7 million of its original $8 million fundraising goal, which was enough to enable the trust to move forward and sign a purchase agreement with Yankee, with the actual purchase expected to be finalized in late summer or fall of 2014. The majority of the $8 million fundraising goal reflects separation costs to make the preserved portion of the plant viable as a standalone structure.

The remaining portion of the Willow Run complex, which includes over 95% of the historic building, has been sold to Walbridge, Inc., for redevelopment as a connected vehicle research and test facility. RACER Trust will demolish this portion of the building prior to turning the property over to Walbridge. Preparations for demolition of Willow Run Assembly facility, with the exception of the portion that the Yankee Air Museum is campaigning to save, were well underway as of August 2014, with much of the building already demolished.

In October 2014 the museum announced that it is changing its name to the National Museum of Aviation and Technology at Historic Willow Run.

With the planned decommissioning of Hangar 1, the museum was forced to find a new home for its flying collection. After initially considering a location adjacent to the Bomber Plant hangars, a site on the east side of the airport was selected for the Roush Aeronautics Center.

=== 2024 name change ===
The museum changed its name to Michigan Flight Museum in May 2024. The following month it announced the sale of its B-17.

== Collection ==
The Museum's Collections & Exhibits building covers 47,000 square feet (4,400 m^{2}) of floor space and houses permanent and rotating aviation and historical displays, restoration projects, a retail store and a movie theatre that is available to the public. It is also home to museum staff and volunteers and has meeting rooms and banquet facilities for rent, machine shops and storage space for the museum collection. An outside area next to the museum is the new home of the air park.

From 2007 until August 2011, the Yankee Air Museum's flyable aircraft were hangared at the Township Airport at Grosse Ile, Michigan.

=== Airworthy ===
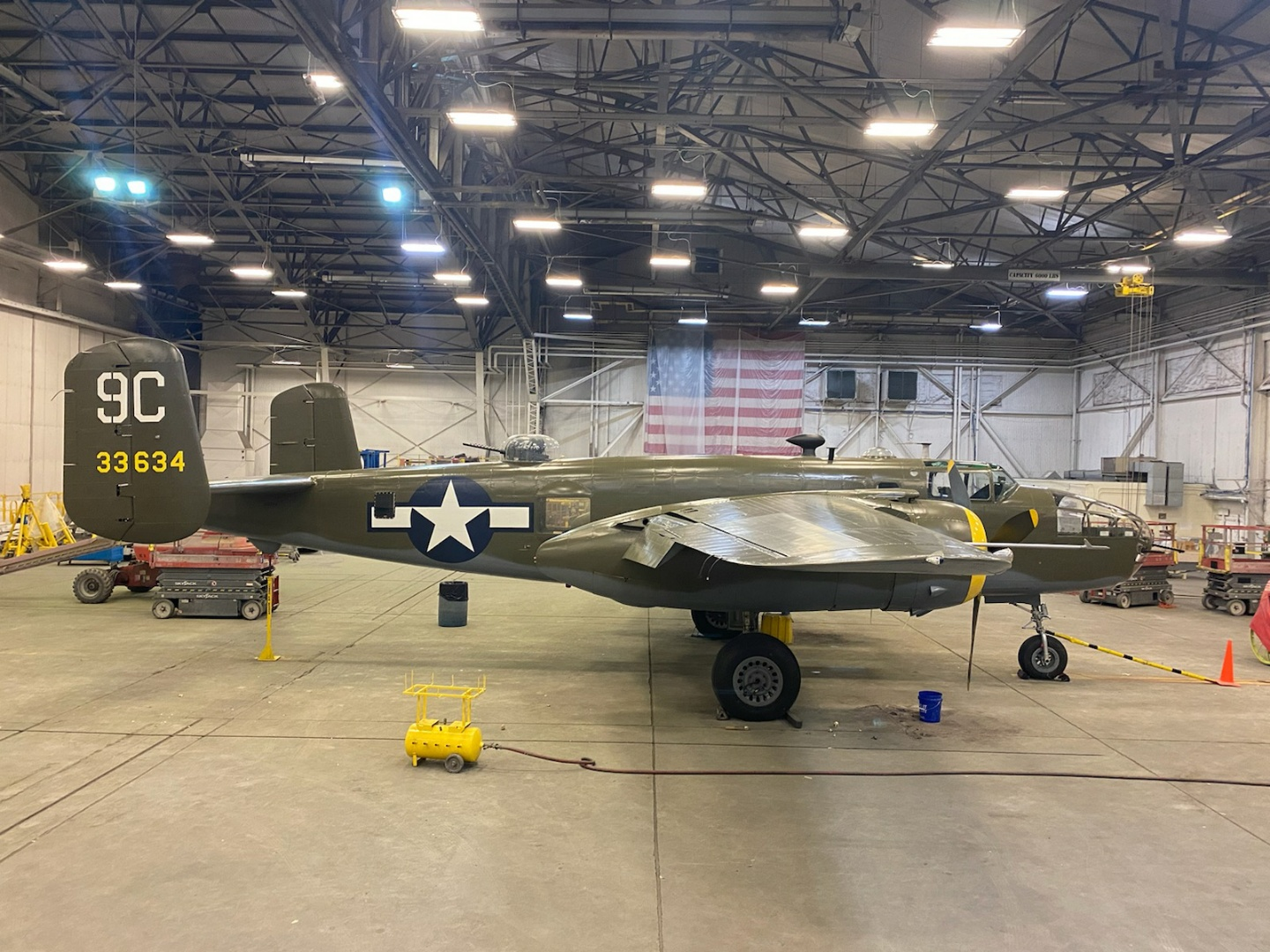
Rosie's Reply, former Yankee Warrior, one of only two B-25C/D Mitchell aircraft still flying today.

- North American B-25D Mitchell 43-3634 Rosie's Reply (formerly Yankee Warrior) – It flew 8 combat missions over Italy.
- Douglas TC-47D Skytrain 44-76716 "Hairless Joe"
- Bell UH-1 Iroquois "Greyhound" 66-01126
- Ford 4-AT-B Trimotor 42

=== Aircraft on display ===
- Boeing B-52D Stratofortress 55-0677
- SPAD S.XIII 4523 – Replica
- Consolidated PB4Y-2G Privateer, 59876.
- Convair C-131B (53-7813; c/n 265)
- Douglas A-4C Skyhawk 148543
- Douglas SBD-3 Dauntless 06626
- Lockheed EC-121K Warning Star 141311
- Lockheed P2V-7 Neptune 140443

- Martin RB-57A Canberra 52-1426
- McDonnell NF-101B Voodoo 56-0235
- McDonnell Douglas F-4C Phantom II 63-7555
- Douglas DC-8-63CF N865F
- McDonnell Douglas F/A-18C Hornet
- North American F-86L Sabre 53-1060
- North American F-100C Super Sabre 54-1785
- Republic F-84F Thunderstreak 51-9501
- Republic RF-84F Thunderflash 52-7421
- Bell AH-1J SeaCobra "159212"

==== Gliders ====
- Franklin PS-2

== See also ==
- List of aviation museums
