= Wayne County Airport Authority =

Airport authority in Michigan, US

Agency overview
- Formed: April 24, 2002
- Jurisdiction: Wayne County, Michigan
- Headquarters: Detroit Metropolitan Airport, Romulus, Michigan
- Employees: 707 (2024)
- Annual budget: $483 million (2025)
- Agency executive: Chad Newton, CEO
- Key document: Public Airport Authority Act, 2002 PA 90
- Website: metroairport.com/business

The Wayne County Airport Authority is a county government agency of Wayne County, Michigan, which operates the Detroit Metropolitan and Willow Run airports. The authority was created by an act of the Michigan Legislature in 2002, and is operationally independent from the Wayne County government. The Wayne County Airport Authority directly employs over 700 employees, and has an annual operating budget of over $400 million.

== Operations ==
The Wayne County Airport Authority is responsible for the operations of Detroit Metropolitan Airport (DTW) in Romulus, and Willow Run Airport (YIP) in Van Buren Township. DTW is the busiest airport in Michigan and the primary passenger service airport for Southeast Michigan, serving as a hub for Delta Air Lines.

Willow Run serves freight and general aviation traffic, and houses the corporate headquarters of Kalitta Air, Kalitta Charters, and USA Jet Airlines.

== Governance ==
The airport authority is an independent county-level government agency, governed by a seven-member board of directors. The current governance structure was created by the Public Airport Authority Act of 2002. Four board members are appointed by the Wayne County Executive, two are appointed by the Governor of Michigan, and one is appointed by the Wayne County Commission.

The airport authority is headquartered in the Michael Berry Administration Building, located adjacent to the Warren Cleage Evans Terminal at Detroit Metropolitan Airport. The administration building opened in 2017. The airport authority's offices were formerly located in decommissioned airport terminals at DTW.

The board of directors hires a professional CEO to lead the authority. Chad Newton has served as the airport authority's CEO since 2019.

== History ==
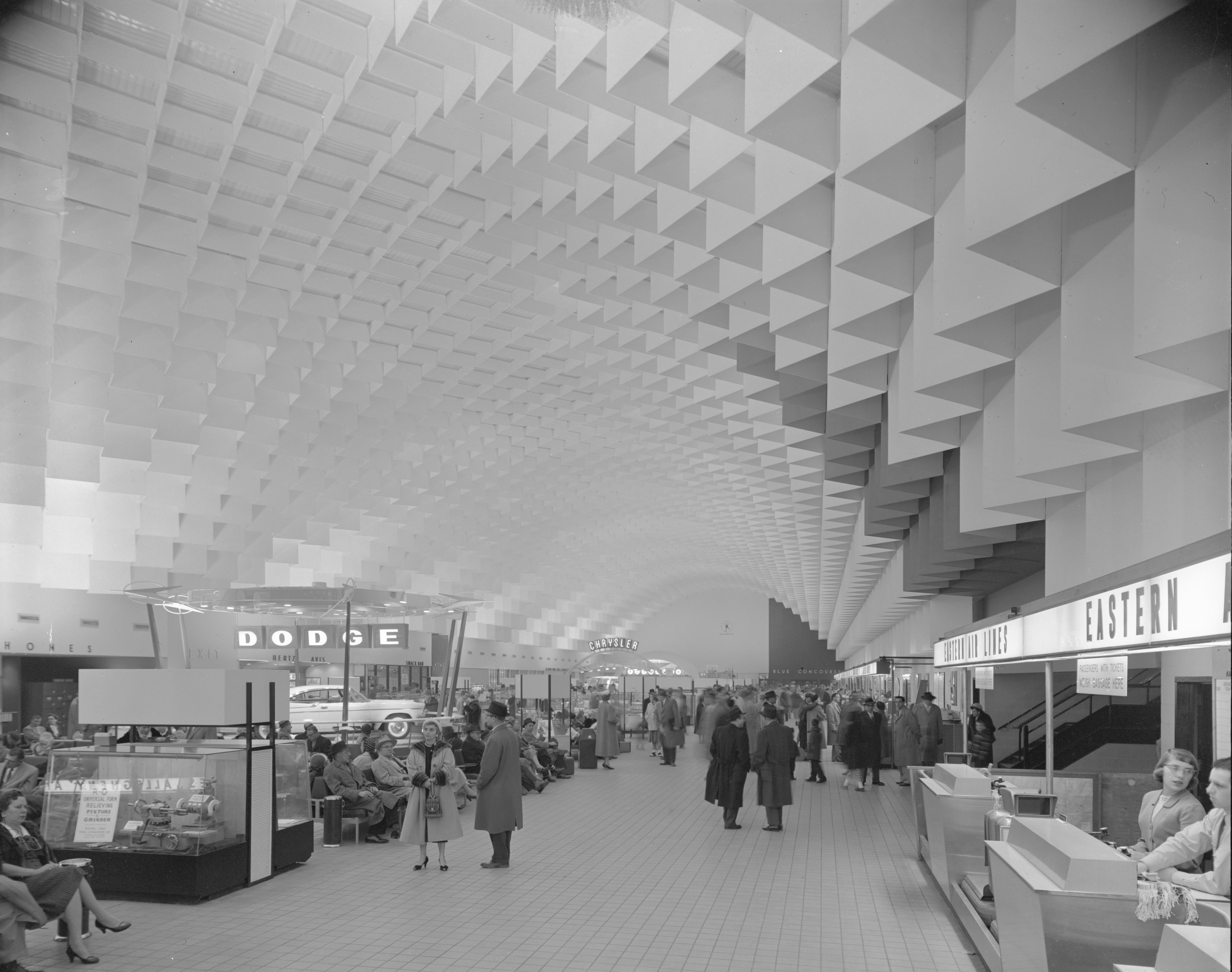
Interior of the Willow Run Airport terminal, 1958

The Wayne County Airport Authority was formed in 2002, and traces its history to the construction of Wayne County Airport by the Wayne County Road Commission in 1930. The politically powerful, well-funded, and administratively independent Road Commission had broad responsibilities for roads, airports, and county parks. Wayne County Airport, now Detroit Metropolitan Wayne County Airport, became the main airport for Metro Detroit in the 1960s.

Willow Run Airport, located in Van Buren Township, opened during World War II as part of the Willow Run manufacturing complex. The University of Michigan purchased the airport in 1947 and leased it to the Airlines National Terminal Service Company, a consortium of major airlines. The university took over management of the airport in 1966, after airline service moved to Detroit Metropolitan Airport. The university found the airport to be financially unsustainable by the mid-1970s. Van Buren Township leaders proposed the Willow Run Joint Airport Commission, an independent airport authority, as the new operator of Willow Run. The Joint Airport Commission failed a financial review by the Federal Aviation Administration, and the university donated the airport to the Road Commission in 1977.

The airports remained under the control of the Road Commission until the agency's merger with the general county government in the mid-1980s. The airports had dedicated revenue sources from rent and fees charged to airlines and airport businesses, but were still administratively controlled by the county government. The Mackinac Center for Public Policy published a report arguing that the airport should be privatized in 1988, citing the 1986 privatization of the British Airports Authority.

In 1999, the state of Michigan began an investigation into the county's handling of contracts for airport services, initiated by Republican members of the state Senate. The Detroit News reported that a majority of the value of new airport contracts in 2000 went to campaign donors to Wayne County Executive Edward H. McNamara, and the FBI opened an investigation into parking contractor APCOA. The contracting scandal continued to develop until early 2002, when McNamara announced that he had reached an agreement with Michigan Governor John Engler to end the state investigation and create an independent airport authority. The authority was proposed as a 7-member board of directors, with 4 members appointed by the Wayne County Executive.

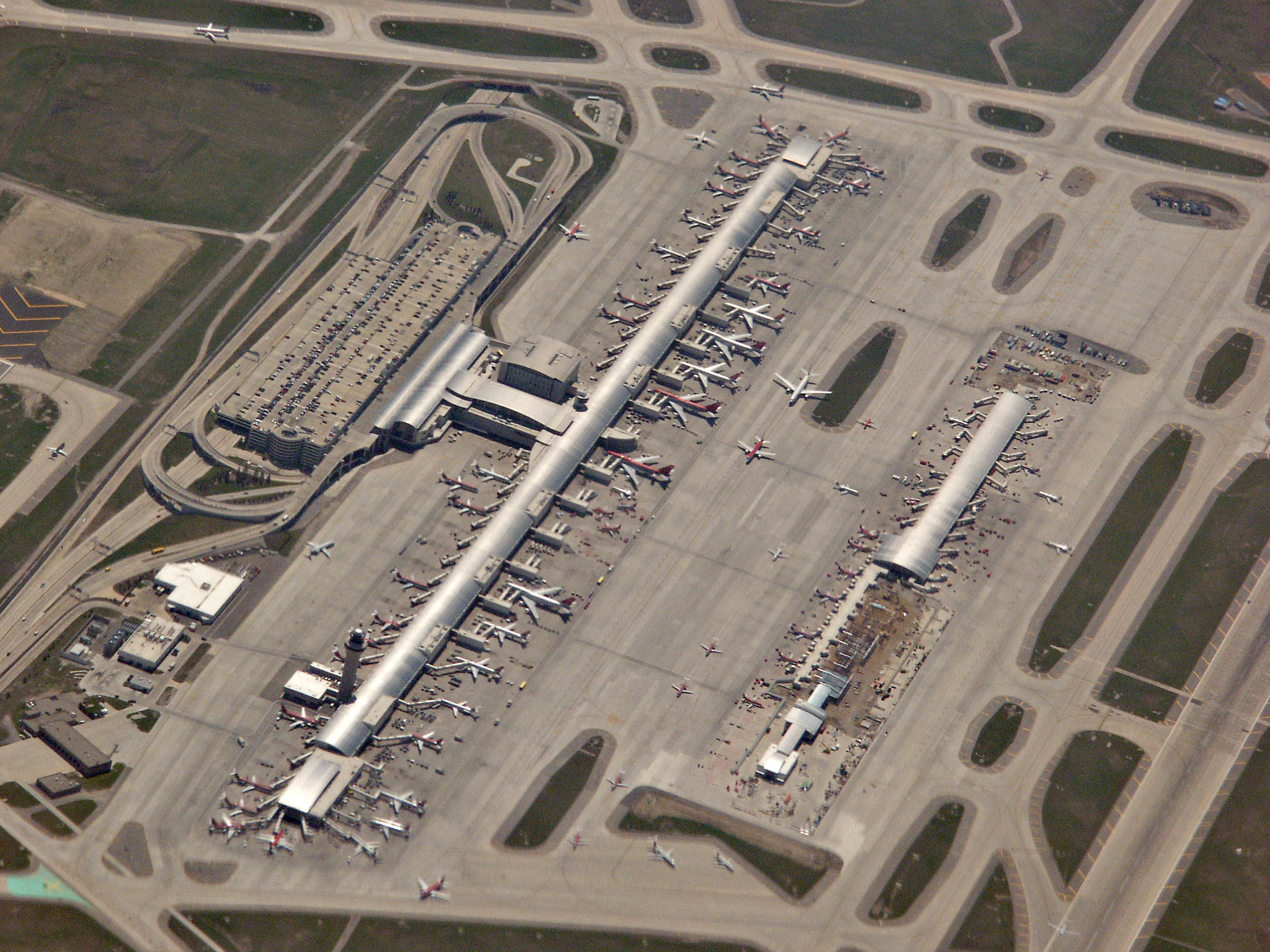
Aerial view of the McNamara Terminal in 2005

The structure of the authority drew criticism from the Wayne County Commission, which would only appoint one member to the authority board; and from Detroit newspaper The Michigan Citizen, which compared the changes to the recent state takeover of the Detroit school board. The Romulus Roman argued that residents near the airport "would continue to [have] absolutely no say when it comes to the airport, including sound control issues." McNamara wrote in a Detroit Free Press editorial that the concept of an independent authority was proposed by a group of local business leaders, and argued that the airports had become overly politicized.

The Wayne County Airport Authority was established in March 2002 by an act of the Michigan Legislature, and held its first meeting in April. The transfer of operations from the county to the airport authority occurred in August 2002, after the Wayne County Commission unsuccessfully sued the airport authority and the FAA in an attempt to prevent the transfer of the airports' operating licenses. The airport authority began implementing changes, including refinancing bonds and consulting with real estate firm Taubman Centers to improve concessions at DTW.

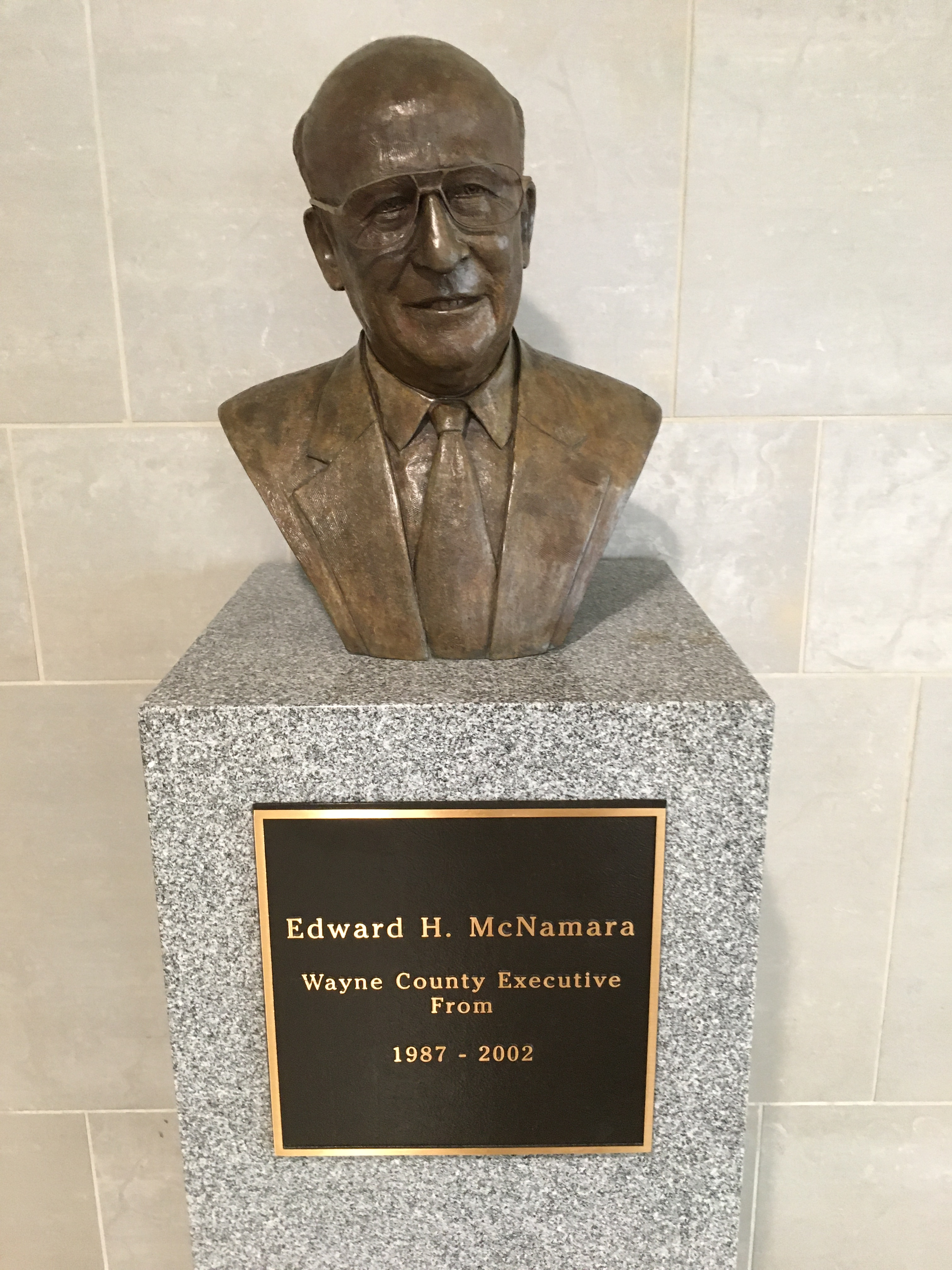
Bust of Edward McNamara, Wayne County Executive at the time of the airport authority's founding, on display at DTW

The airport authority took over DTW in the midst of a major expansion project, which began in the mid-1990s. The authority's first meeting was held weeks after the opening of the first phase of the project, a new midfield terminal now known as the Edward H. McNamara Terminal. The authority was responsible for implementing the rest of the project, including the construction of a new North Terminal (now the Warren Cleage Evans Terminal), which opened in 2008.

In the 2010s, the airport authority expanded its cooperation with regional economic development initiatives, including the Detroit Region Aerotropolis and the American Center for Mobility. The Detroit Region Aerotropolis promotes the construction and expansion of manufacturing and logistics companies near the airports, in partnership with business interests and local governments. The American Center for Mobility operates a self-driving car proving ground adjacent to Willow Run Airport.

Airport authority CEO Turkia Mullin was the subject of a controversy over Wayne County employee severance packages in 2011, when it was revealed that she had received a $200,000 severance from the Wayne County government after voluntarily resigning her position as county economic development director. The airport authority board of directors fired Mullin in an October 2011 meeting, and the resulting controversy caused the resignation of multiple Wayne County political appointees and airport authority board chair Renee Axt. Mullin was denied a county pension in a 2014 court ruling, but she was awarded a settlement of over $850,000. The scandal contributed to the downfall of Wayne County Executive Robert A. Ficano, who lost his 2014 bid for re-election to Warren Evans.

In a separate investigation, a member of the authority's management was sentenced to 10 years in prison in a $5 million fraud case involving airport contractors. James Warner was convicted in 2019 on charges that included conspiracy, money laundering, and obstruction of justice for his role in the scheme, which involved inflating invoices for services billed to the airport authority. Warner died at his home in Commerce Township in February 2022, the day before he was scheduled to report to prison.

== See also ==
- Detroit Region Aerotropolis
- American Center for Mobility
