= Willow Run =

Manufacturing complex in Michigan, US

Ford's Willow Run Assembly Plant of Aircraft
- Coordinates: 42.2414°N 83.5508°W
- Industry: Aircraft Assembly
- Products: B-24 Liberator aircraft
- Employees: 42,500
- Area: 3.5 million-square-foot
- Owners: U.S. government, operated by Ford Motor Company

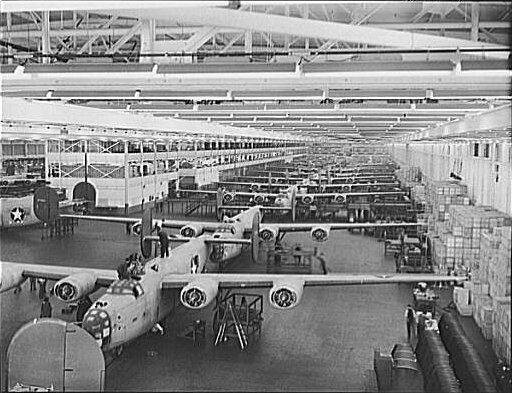
B-24s under construction at Willow Run

Willow Run, also known as Air Force Plant 31, was a manufacturing complex in Michigan, United States, located between Ypsilanti Township and Belleville, built by the Ford Motor Company to manufacture aircraft, especially the Consolidated B-24 Liberator heavy bomber. Construction of the Willow Run Bomber Plant began in 1940 and was completed in 1942.

== Defense plant ==
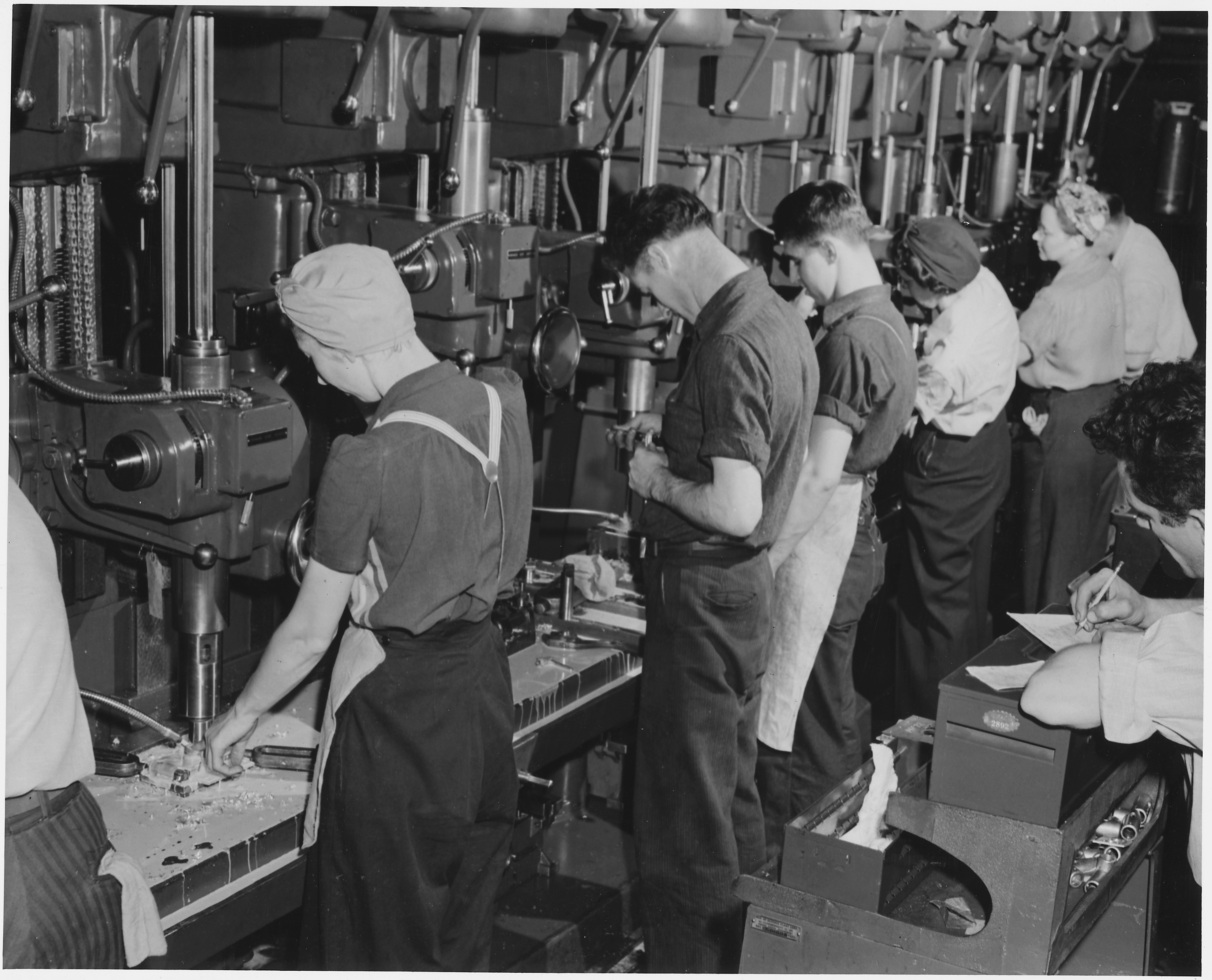
Turning out parts for bomber planes at Willow Run, 1942

The plant began production in summer 1942; the dedication plaque is dated June 16. The plant initially built components. The aircraft manufacturer Douglas Aircraft, and the B-24's designer, Consolidated Aircraft, assembled the finished airplane. Remote assembly proved problematic, however, and by October 1941 Ford received permission to produce complete Liberators. Willow Run's Liberator assembly line ran until May 1945, building almost half of all the Liberators produced.

=== Statistics ===
- employees: 42,500
- military draft losses: each month 8,200 workers were drafted into military service
- training: the Aircraft Apprentice School had up to 8,000 students per week complete training and report for work
- size: 3.5-million-square-feet
- dimensions: More than 3,200 feet long and 1,279 feet across at its widest point
- aircraft: B-24 aircraft production began in the final weeks of 1942
- subassemblies: parts production and subassemblies were produced at almost 1,000 Ford factories and independent suppliers

== Airport ==
Willow Run Airport was built as part of the bomber plant. The airfield passed into civilian hands after the war and is now controlled by Wayne County Airport Authority. Part of the airport complex operated at various times as a research facility affiliated with the University of Michigan, and as a secondary United States Air Force Installation. Willow Run Airport has remained active as a cargo and general aviation airfield. Since 1992, the airport has been home to the former Yankee Air Museum and the National Museum of Aviation and Technology at Historic Willow Run, now referred to as the Michigan Flight Museum.

== Camp Willow Run ==
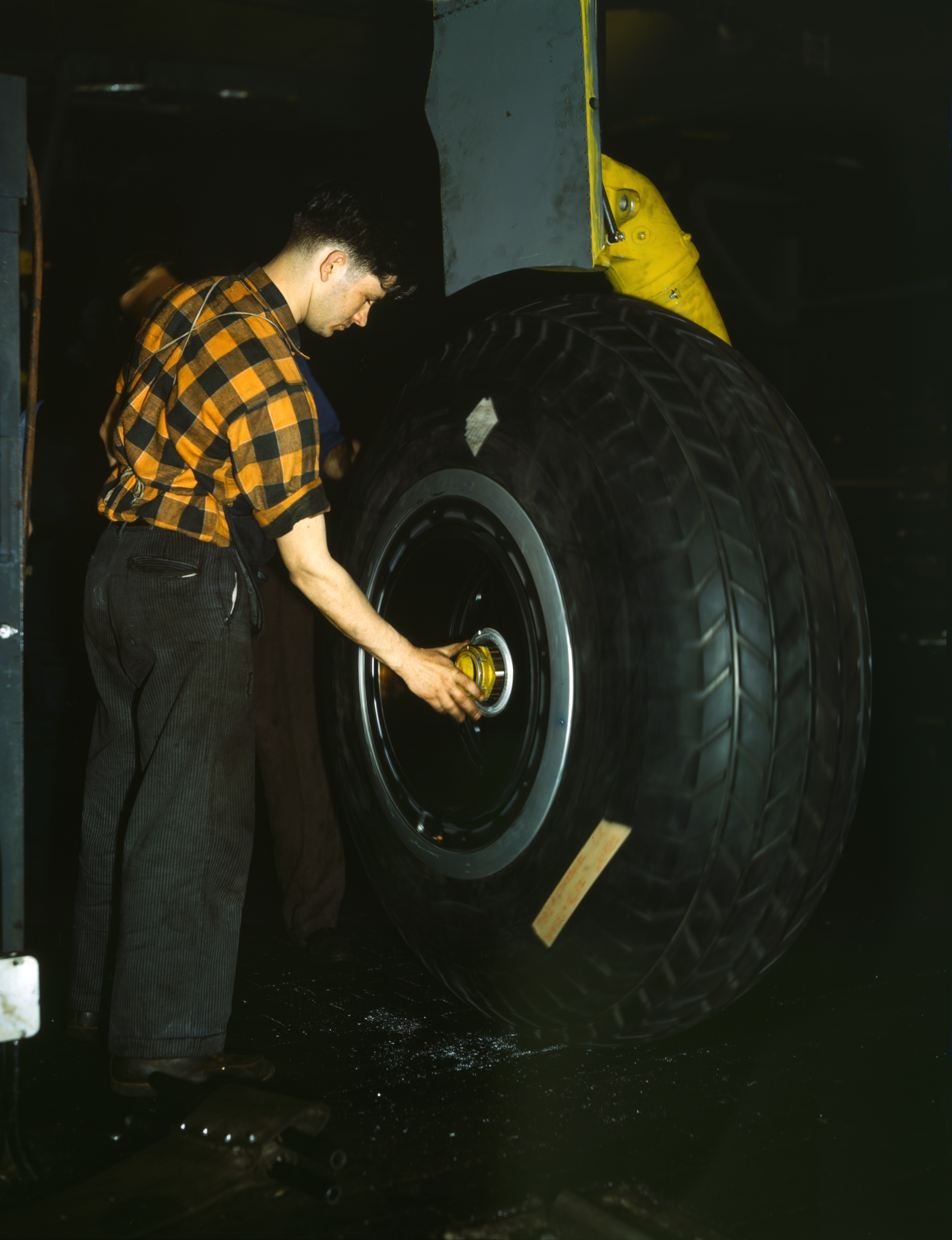
Inspection of the landing gear of a transport plane at Willow Run

Willow Run takes its name from a small tributary of the Huron River that meandered through pastureland fields and woodland along the Wayne–Washtenaw county line until the late 1930s. By the mid-1920s, a local family operating as Quirk Farms had bought the land in Van Buren Township that became the airport. Quirk Farms was purchased by automobile pioneer Henry Ford in 1931. Ford, a keen exponent of the virtues of country living, used it as farmland for a "social engineering" experiment that brought inner-city boys to the Willow Run Camp to learn about farming, nature, and the rural way of life.

The residents of the Willow Run Camp planted, tended, and harvested field crops and collected maple syrup, selling their products at the farm market on the property. In the process, the boys were to learn self-discipline and the values of hard work, and benefit from the fresh air of the country.

Camp Willow Run was for boys age 17–19, mostly sons of dead or disabled WWI vets and those helping to support their families. According to the Benson Ford Research Center, the camp offered:

"...farm training, self-reliance, management, and salesmanship...the boys governed themselves, appointing a foreman and field foreman from their own ranks. They lived in tents, with a mess hall and a chapel on-site, and sold their produce from a roadside stand built by Ford. Boys...had time for recreation as well as work, each camp had a baseball diamond and the boys participated in a softball league, there was also volleyball and handball, movies were shown, and each camp also hosted harvest dances, inviting nearby high school students to join. It appears that Camp Willow Run shut down after the 1941 season with the coming of the bomber plant, many of the boys went to work at the Willow Run village industry plant, and others moved on to the apprentice and trade school."

=== Chapel of Martha and Mary ===
Henry and Clara Bryant Ford dedicated a series of churches, the chapels of Martha and Mary as a perpetual tribute to their mothers, Mary Ford and Martha Bryant. The Fords built seven of these: The first at Greenfield Village, Michigan, was completed in 1929. The others, completed in the 1930s, were located in Dearborn, Michigan (site of the Fords' Fair Lane estate); Sudbury, Massachusetts; two in Richmond Hill, Georgia (the Fords' winter home); Macon, Michigan; and Willow Run.

The Willow Run Chapel was the one originally built for Camp Willow Run, and became the place of worship for the Belleville Presbyterian Church in 1979 after a series of handoffs. After the war, Ford sold the chapel to Kaiser-Frazer, who in turn sold it to General Motors as part of the purchase of the Willow Run bomber plant. GM used the building to store files until an undetermined time, where it was sold to the Cherry Hill Baptist Church. When Cherry Hill outgrew the little chapel and decided to build a new church, it sold the chapel to the Belleville Presbyterian Church for one dollar in July 1978.

The Willow Run chapel of Martha and Mary now stands a few miles from where it was originally constructed, on property that used to be owned by Henry Ford's Quirk Farms. Of the seven chapels, this is the only one currently in use as a regular place of worship. It still has the original pews and other furnishings; the only other set in active use belongs to the Greenfield Village chapel.

== Factory construction ==
Like virtually all of the United States' industrial concerns, Ford Motor Company, by this time under the direction of Henry Ford's only son Edsel, directed its manufacturing output during World War II to Allied war production.

In early 1941 the Federal government established the Liberator Production Pool Program to meet the projected demand for the B-24, and the Ford company joined the program shortly thereafter. Ford Motor would not only build the bombers, it would supply the airfield as well; the farm at Willow Run was an ideal location for the airfield's runways, being under the personal ownership of Henry Ford (thus solving any land acquisition problem) and sited between the main roads and rail lines connecting Detroit with Ann Arbor and points to the west. Easements were acquired from landowners across the county line in Ypsilanti Township where the Liberator plant (and eventually the airport terminal) would be built.

Although officially retired, Henry Ford still had a say in the company's affairs and refused government financing for Willow Run, preferring to have his company build the factory and sell it to the government, which would lease it back to the company for the duration of the war. Ford Motor was to have first option on the plant after war production ended, an option it ultimately chose not to exercise, although a rumor in Drew Pearson's syndicated column had Ford planning a postwar use as a tractor factory, but that never came to pass. Ford would eventually sell its land to the Reconstruction Finance Corporation's Defense Plant Corporation in July 1944, shortly after the Ford farms were transferred to the company's ownership.

Architect Albert Kahn designed the main structure of the Willow Run bomber plant, which had 3,500,000 square feet (330,000 m^{2}) of factory space, and an aircraft assembly line over a mile (1600 m) long. It was thought to be the largest factory under one roof anywhere in the world. The Willow Run plant featured four large turntables two-thirds of the way along the assembly lines, allowing the B-24 production lines to make a 90° turn before continuing to final assembly. According to legend, this arrangement allowed the company to pay taxes on the entire plant (and its equipment) to Washtenaw County, and avoid the higher taxes of Wayne County where the airfield is located; overhead views suggest that avoiding encroachment on the airfield's taxiways was also a motivation.

=== Employee housing crisis ===
Even with people driving 100 miles or renting every spare room between Ann Arbor and Grosse Pointe, the sheer size of Willow Run led inevitably to a housing shortage. Because of the urgent need for shelter, the Federal Public Housing Administration took action and built temporary housing.

==== Willow Run Lodge and Village ====
The resulting housing complexes were built in several different groups. Willow Run Lodge was a series of dormitories for single people and was built on the land north of Michigan Avenue and south of Geddes Road. This covered 90 parcels of land totaling 2,641 acres (1,069 ha).

In February 1943, the first dormitory (Willow Run Lodge) opened, consisted of fifteen buildings containing 1,900 rooms, some single- and others double-occupancy, with room for 3,000 people. Between June and December 1943, construction was completed on temporary "flat-top" buildings providing homes for 2,500 families. This section was known as Willow Run Village. The flat-tops contained four, six, or eight apartments with one, two, or three bedrooms.

Also in the Willow Run Village were the West Court buildings, with peaked rooftops and space for couples or three adults. Of the 1,000 apartments in West Court, some had no bedrooms and were called "zero bedroom" apartments, and the rest had one bedroom. The first of these apartments were ready for occupancy in August 1943. Another large dormitory project, containing 1,960 rooms and known as West Lodge, was also ready for tenants at that time.

By the end of 1943 there were six different temporary projects in the vicinity of Willow Run: two dormitory projects, two trailer projects (one renting trailers, and another for privately owned trailers; each with community laundry, shower, and toilet facilities), and two projects with apartments for couples or families, West Court and the Village. Between them, there was a shelter for more than 15,000 people, roughly the number of people living in Ypsilanti at the time.

==== Parkridge Homes ====
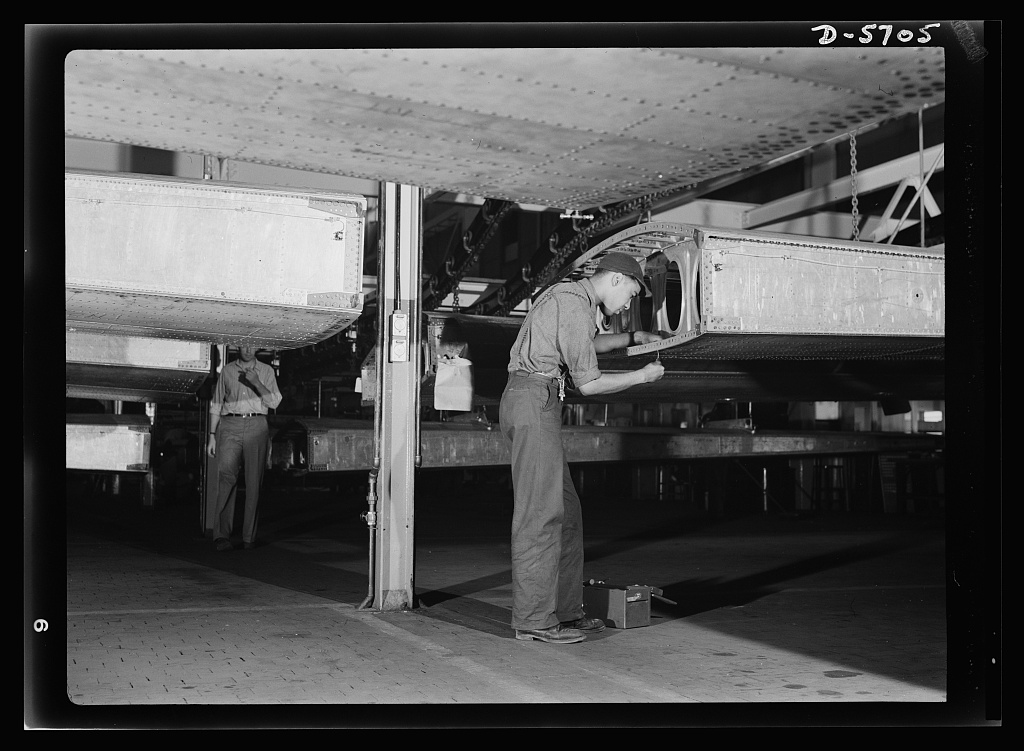
African American worker at Willow Run, July 1942

In addition to the Willow Run Lodge and Village housing projects, another community named Parkridge Homes was also built in 1943 to house African-American Willow Run employees. Efforts to desegregate Willow Run Lodge and Village and build additional integrated housing were rebuffed by the Detroit Housing Commission and the National Housing Agency, so noted African-American architect Hilyard Robinson was contracted to design an 80-unit community. The housing complex remained in use until 2016 as public housing when it was demolished and rebuilt with new modern units. In May 2017, the Michigan State Historic Preservation Office recognized Parkridge Homes with the unveiling of three historic markers signifying the importance to Ypsilanti history.

Also constructed at this time was the Parkridge Community Center.

==== Sociological study on Willow Run housing crisis ====
Sociologist and professor Lowell Juilliard Carr and James Edson Stermer of the University of Michigan studied the sociological conditions at Willow Run arising from the wartime surge in the worker population in their book of 1952. They discuss "cultural inadequacy theory", stating that "industrial culture provides no criterion by which either a manufacturer or a government official can determine in advance when a manufacturer should divert his own capital to housing and other community services and when he shall rely on the capital of others for such facilities and services".

== Liberator production ==
Despite intensive design efforts led by Ford production executive Charles E. Sorensen, the opening of the plant still saw some mismanagement and bungling, and quality was uneven for some time. Although the Ford Trimotor had been a success in the 1920s, the company had since shied away from aviation, and initially, Ford was assigned to provide B-24 components with final assembly performed by Consolidated at its Fort Worth, Texas plant, or by Douglas Aircraft at its Tulsa, Oklahoma, plant. However, in October 1941, Ford received permission from Consolidated and the Army to assemble complete Liberators on its own at its new Willow Run facility. It took only a short year before finished Liberators left the factory. An amazing feat of factory construction and commissioning.

According to Max Wallace, Air Corps Chief, General "Hap" Arnold told Charles Lindbergh, then a consultant at the plant, that "combat squadrons greatly preferred the B-17 bomber to the B-24 because 'when we send the 17's out on a mission, most of them return. But when we send the 24's out, most of them don't.'"

A 1943 committee authorized by Congress to examine problems at the plant issued a highly critical report; the Ford Motor Company had created a production line that too closely resembled an automobile assembly line "despite the warning of many experienced aircraftmen."

Although the jumping of an automotive company into aircraft production posed these quality problems, it also brought remarkable production rates. The plant held the distinction of being the world's largest enclosed "room." The first Ford-built Liberator rolled off the Willow Run line in September 1942; the first series of Willow Run Liberators was the B-24E model.

A small part of the world's largest one-story war production plant, the giant bomber factory at Willow Run, Michigan. Fixtures in background hold bomber wings during assembly, 1942.

The Willow Run Plant had many initial startup problems, due primarily to the fact that Ford employees were used to automobile mass production and found it difficult to adapt these techniques to aircraft production. The plant at Willow Run was also beset with labor difficulties, high absentee rates, and rapid employee turnover. The factory was nearly an hour's drive from Detroit, and the imposition of wartime gasoline and tire rationing had made the daily commute difficult. In only one month, Ford had hired 2,900 workers but had lost 3,100.

Also, Henry Ford was cantankerous and rigid in his ways. He was violently anti-union and there were serious labor difficulties, including a massive strike. In addition, Henry Ford refused on principle to hire women. However, he finally relented and did employ "Rosie the Riveters" on his assembly lines, probably more because so many of his potential male workers had been drafted into the military than due to any sudden change of principle on his part.

By autumn 1943, the top leadership role at Willow Run had passed from Charles Sorensen to Mead L. Bricker.

At the request of the government, Ford began to decentralize operations and many parts were assembled at other Ford plants as well as by the company's sub-contractors, with the Willow Run plant concentrating on final aircraft assembly. The bugs were eventually worked out of the manufacturing processes, and by 1944, Ford was rolling a Liberator off the Willow Run production line every 63 minutes, 24 hours a day, 7 days a week.

At its peak monthly production (April, 1944), Willow Run produced 428 B-24s with highest production listed as 100 completed bombers flying away from Willow Run between April 24 and April 26, 1944. By 1945, Ford produced 70% of the B-24s in two 9-hour shifts. Ford built 6,972 of the 18,482 total B-24s and produced knock-down kits for 1,893 more to be assembled by Consolidated in Ft. Worth, TX and Douglas Aircraft in Tulsa, OK. The B-24 holds the distinction of being the most produced heavy bomber in history.

=== Army Air Forces support and post-production activities ===
After their manufacture, the next step in the process was the delivery of the aircraft to the operational squadrons. This was done at Willow Run by 1st Concentration Command (1st CC). The 1st CC was responsible for completing the organization and equipment of tactical and combat bombardment squadrons prior to their deployment to the overseas combat theaters. It also provided a final inspection of the aircraft and made any appropriate final changes; i.e., install long-range fuel tanks, remove unnecessary equipment, and give it a final flight safety test.

While the planes were being serviced and made ready for overseas movement, personnel for these planes were also being processed. Pilots, co-pilots, navigators and crew chiefs were assigned as a crew for each aircraft, sleeping on 1,300 cots as they waited for the B-24s to roll off the assembly line. Paperwork was handled, necessary specific B-24 life support equipment was issued and some technical training for supporting the aircraft accomplished.

Once production began, it became difficult to introduce changes dictated by field experience in the various overseas theaters onto the production line in a timely fashion. Consequently, newly constructed Liberators needed modifications for the specific geographic areas they were to be flown in combat. For this reason, a series of Air Technical Service Command modification centers were established for the incorporation of these required theater changes into new Liberators following their manufacture and assignments. There were seven known modification centers: the Birmingham Air Depot in Alabama; Consolidated's Fort Worth plant, the Oklahoma City Air Materiel Center at Tinker Field, the Tucson Modification Center at Tucson International Airport; the Northwest Airlines Depot in Minneapolis; the, Martin-Omaha manufacturing plant, and the Hawaiian Air Depot at Hickam Field. The Birmingham Air Depot's primary mission was modifying Liberators from Willow Run.

=== Liberator variants produced at Willow Run ===
The B-24E was the first variant for primary manufacture at Willow Run. Ford built 490 complete planes and supplied B-24E components as kits that could be trucked for final assembly at Consolidated in Fort Worth and Douglas in Tulsa, 144 and 167 kits respectively.

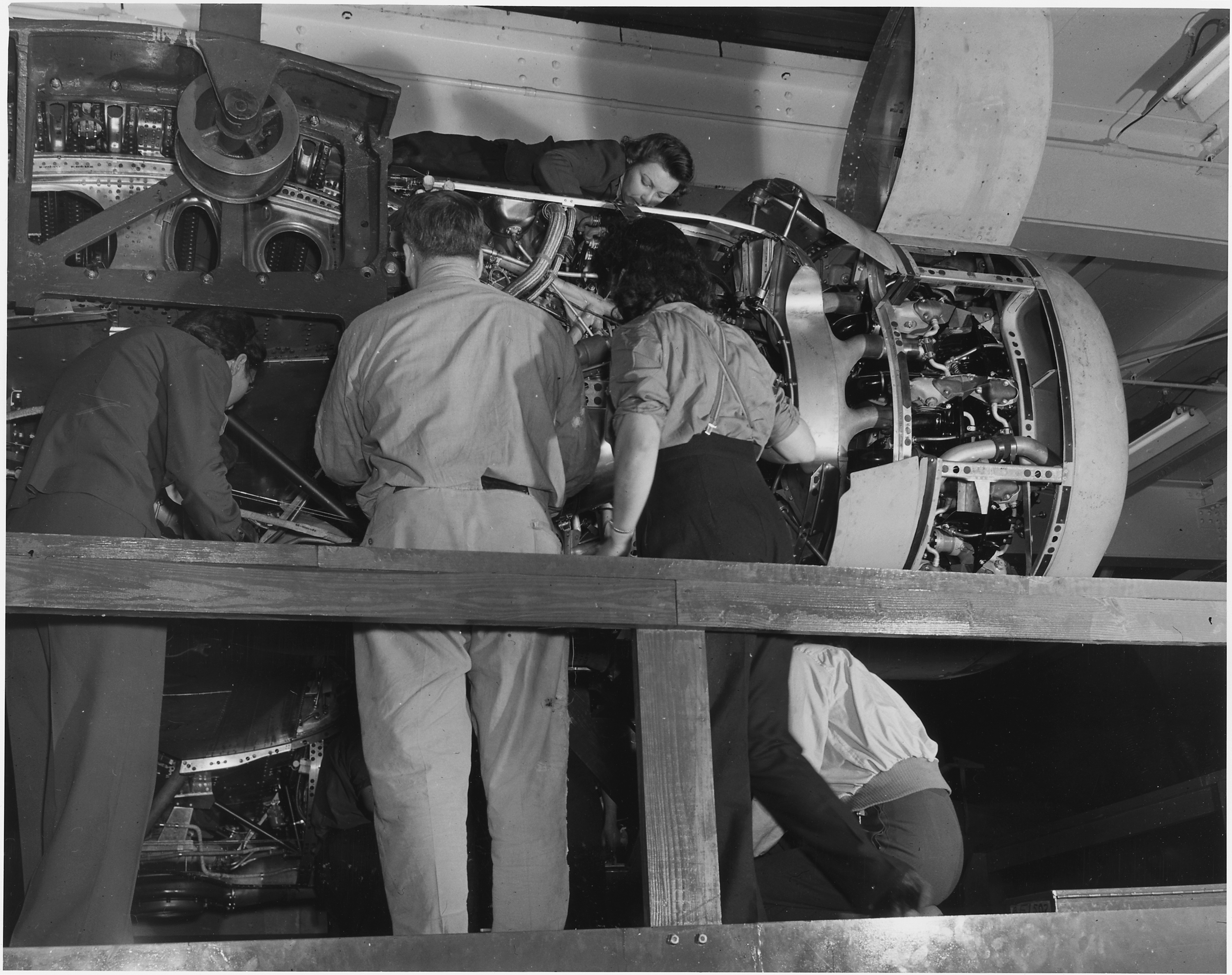
B-24E engine installation, Willow Run 1943

B-24Es built and fully assembled at Ford were designated B-24E-FO; those assembled at Tulsa and Fort Worth out of parts supplied by Ford were designated B-24E-DT and B-24E-CF respectively. Because of production delays the B-24Es produced at Willow Run were, generally, obsolete by the time they came off the production lines, and most were relegated to training roles in the United States and hence few ever saw combat.

The B-24H was the first variant produced by Ford at Willow Run in large numbers that went into combat. The B-24H differed from earlier B-24s by having a nose turret, the Emerson Electric A-15, to increase defensive firepower. Due to the many structural changes required the first B-24Hs were delivered slightly behind schedule, with the first machines rolling off the production lines at Ford in late June 1943. Production for the B-24H at Willow Run was 1,780 aircraft.

Upon the introduction of the B-24J, all three of the Liberator manufacturing plants converted to the production of this version. The B-24J incorporated a hydraulically driven tail turret and other defensive armament modifications in the nose of the aircraft. The bomber plant produced its first B-24J in April 1944; 1587 were built at Willow Run.

During June 1944, the Army determined that the San Diego and Willow Run plants would be capable of meeting all future requirements for Liberator production. The Boeing B-29 Superfortress was taking over the long-range bombing role in the Pacific Theater and no new B-24 units were programmed for deployment in the other combat theaters of Europe, the Mediterranean or in the China Burma India.

The B-24L was the first product of the new, downsized Liberator production pool. It was an attempt to reverse the trend toward ever-increasing weight of the Liberator as more and more armament, equipment, and armor had been added, with no corresponding increase in engine power. With the weight reduction measures and more powerful engines, it also had a much longer range than earlier models. 1,250 B-24L aircraft were built at Willow Run.

The B-24M was the last large-scale production variant of the Liberator. Apart from a new tail turret, the B-24M differed little from the B-24L. The first B-24Ms were delivered in October 1944, and by the end of its production in 1945, Willow Run had built 1677; a further 124 B-24Ms to be built by Ford were cancelled before delivery.

Ford had switched over to the single-tailed B-24N in May 1945, but the end of the war in Europe in the same month brought a rapid end to Liberator production; the contract with Ford was officially terminated on 31 May 1945. Orders for 5,168 unbuilt B-24N bombers were cancelled and only seven 'pre-production' YB-24N were built by Ford. Liberator production at Willow Run ended June 1945.

== Post-war conversion ==
Although Ford had an option to purchase the plant once it was no longer needed for war production, the company declined to exercise it, and ended its association with Willow Run.

=== Kaiser ===
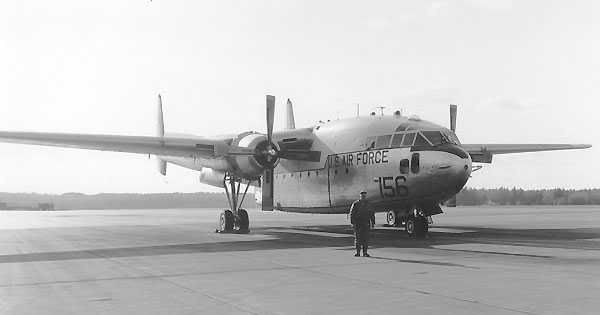
Kaiser-Frazer C-119 built at Willow Run

After Ford declined to purchase the plant, it was sold to the Kaiser-Frazer Corporation, a partnership of construction and shipbuilding magnate Henry J. Kaiser and Graham-Paige executive Joseph W. Frazer. The plant produced both Kaiser and Frazer automobile models, including the compact Henry J, which with minor differences was also sold through Sears-Roebuck as the Allstate.

Willow Run produced 739,000 cars as part of Kaiser-Frazer and Kaiser Motors, from 1947 through 1953, when after years of losses, the company (now called Kaiser Motors after Frazer's exit from the partnership) purchased Willys-Overland and began moving its production at Willow Run to the Willys plant in Toledo, Ohio.

As the US Air Force struggled to expand its airlift capacity during the Korean War, Kaiser-Frazer built C-119 Flying Boxcar cargo planes at Willow Run under license from Fairchild Aircraft, producing an estimated 88 C-119s between 1951 and 1953. Kaiser bought half of the Chase Aircraft company in order to access the military contract for the C-123 Provider transport aircraft. Senate hearings into the C-119 production by Kaiser found that the Kaiser aircraft were costing far more than Fairchild's. C-123 contracts were cancelled by the USAAF and the only airframes built were scrapped

=== MARC and Willow Run Laboratories ===
On the other side of the airport from the assembly plant were a group of World War II hangars, which were sold to the University of Michigan in 1946. The university operated the Michigan Aeronautical Research Center (MARC), later known as Willow Run Laboratories (WRL), from 1946 to 1972. MARC and WRL produced innovations, including the first ruby laser and operation of the ruby maser, as well as early research into antiballistic missile defense and advanced remote sensing.

In 1972, the university spun off WRL into the Environmental Research Institute of Michigan, which eventually left Willow Run for offices in Ann Arbor.

=== General Motors operations ===
Later in 1953, after a fire on August 12 destroyed General Motors' Detroit Transmission factory in Livonia, Michigan, the Willow Run complex was first leased and then later sold to GM. The salvaged Hydramatic transmission tooling and machinery relocated to Willow Run and were back in production just nine weeks after the fire.

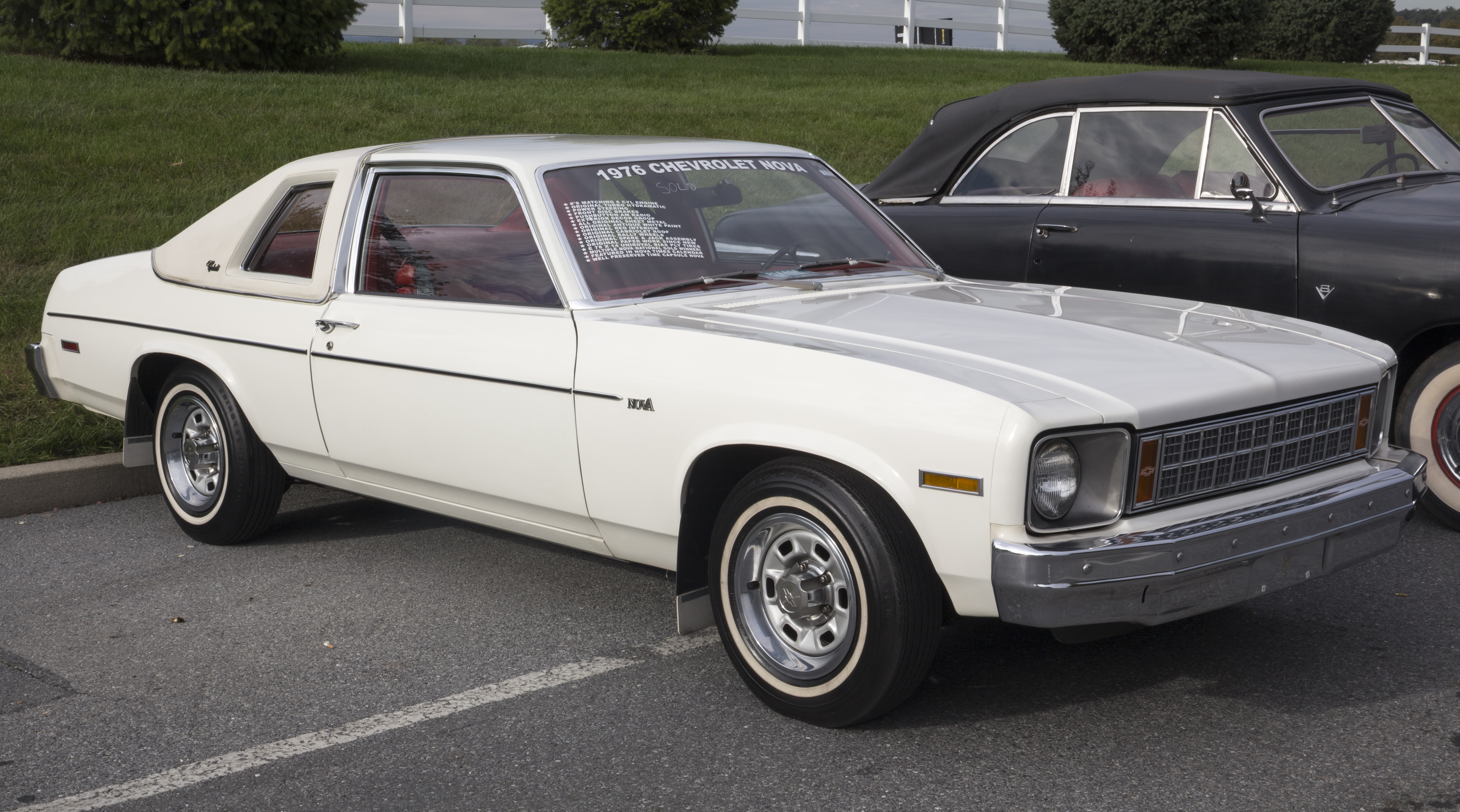
1976 Chevrolet Nova built in Willow Run

Over the years, GM expanded the bomber plant by roughly half, into a nearly 5,000,000 square feet (460,000 m^{2}) GM Powertrain factory and engineering center. A parcel of land to the south of Powertrain was set aside for assembly operations that began in 1959, with a Fisher Body plant that built bodies for the Chevrolet models assembled there, including the Corvair and Nova. In 1968, General Motors began reorganizing its body and assembly operations into the GM Assembly Division (GMAD). GMAD required 16 years to completely absorb Fisher Body's operations, and Fisher would manufacture bodies at Willow Run Assembly until the 1970s; vehicles would roll off the line there until 1992.

In addition to making automatic transmissions, Willow Run Transmission also produced the M16A1 rifle and the M39A1 20mm autocannon for the US military during the Vietnam War.

By the time General Motors entered bankruptcy in 2009, manufacturing and assembly operations at Willow Run had dwindled to almost nothing; the GM Powertrain plant closed in December 2010 and the complex passed into the control of the RACER Trust, which is charged with cleaning up, positioning for redevelopment and ultimately, selling properties of the former General Motors.

== Postwar ==
Ford built the factory and sold it to the government, then leased it back for the duration of the war. When Ford declined to purchase the facility after the war, Kaiser-Frazer Corporation gained ownership, and in 1953 Ford's rival General Motors took ownership and operated the factory as Willow Run Transmission until 2010. Willow Run Assembly operated from 1959 to 1992 on a parcel to the south of the airport. The Fisher Body division also operated at Willow Run Assembly until its operations were assumed by the GM Assembly Division in the 1970s. In 2009, General Motors announced that it would shut down all operations at the GM Powertrain plant and engineering center in the coming year.

Since the 2010 closure of Willow Run Transmission, the factory complex has been managed by the RACER Trust, which controls the properties of the former General Motors. In 2011, A.E. Equities Group Holdings offered to buy the former Powertrain plant from the RACER Trust. In April 2013, a redevelopment manager for the RACER Trust said unused portions of the powertrain plant would likely be razed as a step toward redeveloping the property. Indeed, the majority of the plant was demolished in late 2013 and early 2014. In 2014, the Yankee Air Museum moved into the bomber factory.

In November 2016, RACER Trust sold Willow Run to an entity created by the State of Michigan, which leases the property to the American Center for Mobility (AMC).

The Willow Run complex has given its name to a community on the east side of Ypsilanti, defined roughly by the boundaries of the former Willow Run Community School District.

== Redevelopment efforts and the Yankee Air Museum ==
The airfield, owned by the Wayne County Airport Authority since 2004, continues to operate as the Willow Run Airport and is primarily used for cargo and general aviation flights. The Yankee Air Museum resides on the airport grounds, occupying as of April 2013 a 47,000-square-foot (4,400 m^{2}) hangar and other properties.

For a period of time before the eventual demolition of Willow Run Assembly, portions were used as a warehouse, about a quarter of which was leased by GM as a facility for parts distribution.

In April 2013, the Detroit Free Press confirmed that the facility's current owner, RACER Trust, was negotiating with the Yankee Air Museum to preserve a small portion of the original bomber plant as a new home for the museum. Yankee was originally granted until August 2013 (deadline was later extended) to raise the funds needed to purchase and separate a portion of the approximately 5,000,000 sq. ft. building, which later became the GM Powertrain facility. The museum would consolidate operations scattered on various parcels at Willow Run, and the Trust expects to clear the remainder of the plant for redevelopment. The 175,000-square-foot (16,300 m^{2}) portion of the original bomber plant that Yankee seeks to preserve is less than 5% of the massive facility, comprises the end of the former B-24 assembly line at the far eastern edge of the property, and contains the two iconic bay doors from which the finished Consolidated B-24 Liberator bombers exited the plant during World War II.

The campaign to save a portion of Willow Run for the Yankee Air Museum was called SaveTheBomberPlant.org, and is centered on a fundraising website by the same name. The campaign attracted national, and even international, attention from media outlets that include many major news dailies in the US as well as National Public Radio, The History Channel magazine, National Geographic TV, The Guardian and the Daily Mail, the latter two of the UK.

Building owner RACER Trust extended the original fundraising deadline (August 1, 2013) a total of three times since the Yankee Air Museum launched its SaveTheBomberPlant.org campaign. The first two extensions were to October 1, 2013, and then to November 1, 2013. On October 26, 2013, RACER Trust and the Yankee Air Museum again reached a third, and final, deadline extension agreement that gave Yankee until May 1, 2014, to raise the $8 million estimated as necessary to secure, enclose and preserve a portion of the original Willow Run plant for the Yankee Air Museum. The majority of the $8 million goal reflects separation costs to make the preserved portion of the plant viable as a standalone structure. RACER Trust has been supportive of the campaign, even reconfiguring engineering and demolition plans to save cost for the museum.

By the May 1, 2014, deadline, the Yankee Air Museum had raised over $7 million of its original $8 million fundraising goal, which was enough to enable the building's owners to move forward with signing a Purchase Agreement with Yankee, with the actual purchase expected to be finalized in late summer or fall of 2014.

Meanwhile, the remaining portion of the Willow Run property, which includes over 95% of the historic original bomber plant building, was optioned to Walbridge, Inc., for redevelopment as a connected car research and test facility. The option to Walbridge has since lapsed and the property remains available for purchase and redevelopment.

== Decommission and demolition ==
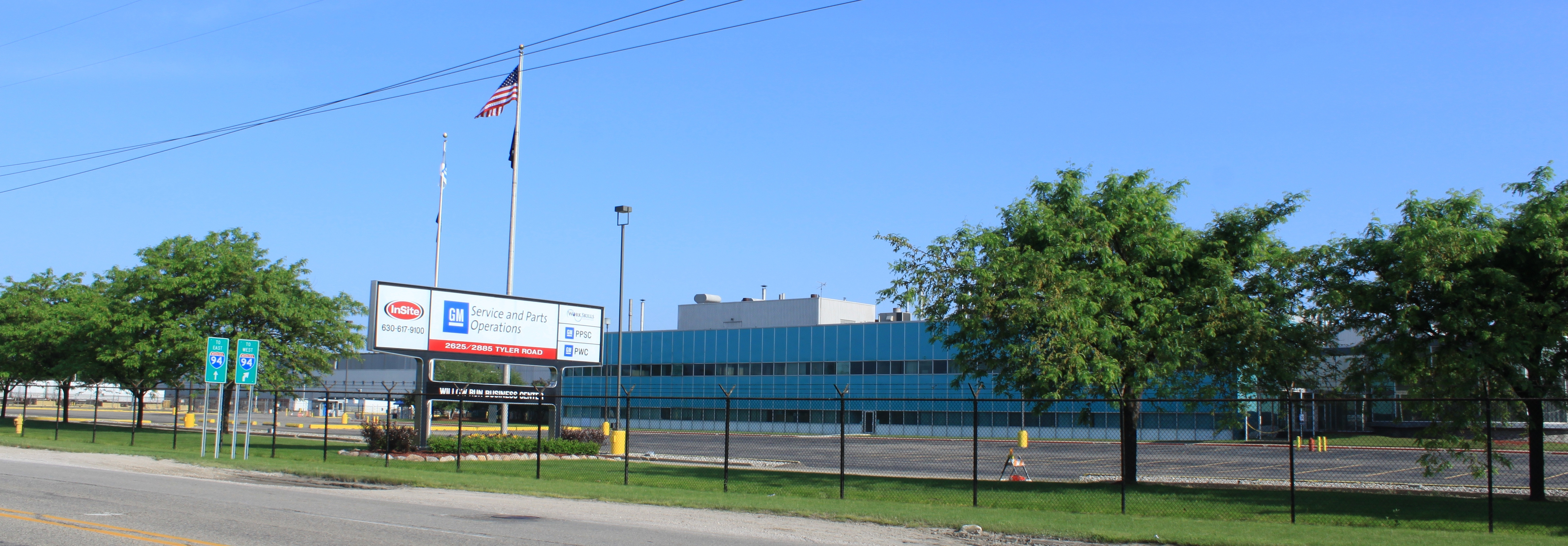
GM service and parts operations, 2011

Michigan Live reporter Amy Biolchini toured the empty Willow Run facility in early 2013, observing:

Every fluorescent light bulb in the plant must be taken out before the building can be torn down. In some places, the bulbs had been simply painted over and left in their sockets as GM quickly re-tooled assembly lines.... The plant was originally designed to be able to continue to operate if parts of it were ever bombed—which resulted in dedicated water, compressed air and gas lines to different areas of the building."

Part of the tour led them to a hidden room within the facility:

Named "Lily's Pad", the break spot was equipped with posters that catered to the male fantasy, an air conditioning unit, rope lights, a TV and a list of restaurant takeout phone numbers."

Demolition of the majority of the Willow Run facility began in December 2013. The Yankee Air Museum was able to gain control of approximately 144,900 square feet of the plant, and plans to develop a permanent home for the museum. By mid-2014, the majority of the facility had been demolished and cleared.

== See also ==
- B-24 Liberator
- Willow Run Airport
- Willow Run Assembly
- Willow Run Transmission
- World War II aircraft production
- Yankee Air Museum
- Ypsilanti Automotive Heritage Collection
