= American Center for Mobility =

Automated vehicle proving ground in Michigan, US

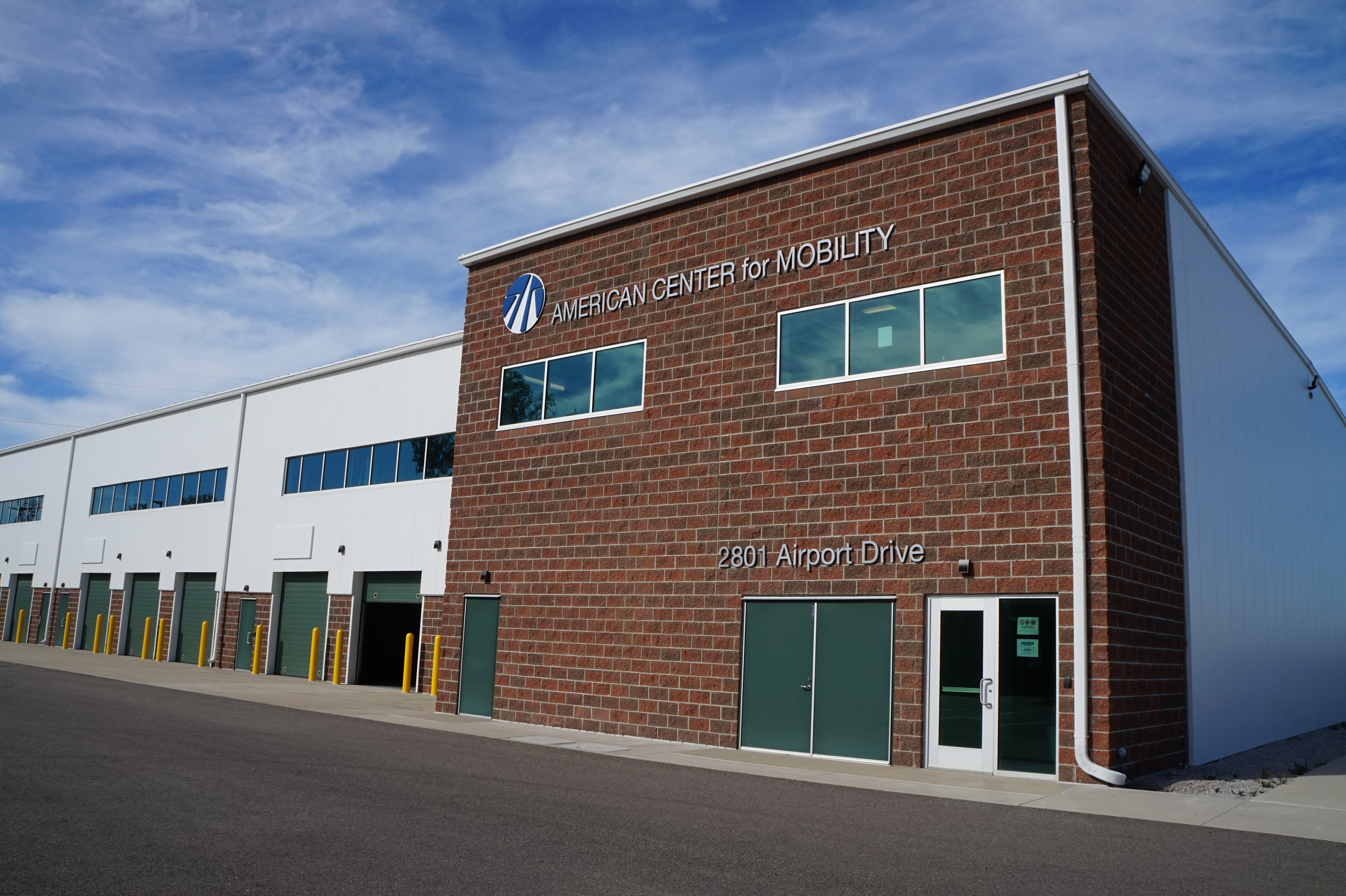
- The American Center for Mobility Offices
- Established: December 2017; 8 years ago
- Field of research: Vehicular automation
- CEO: Reuben Sarkar
- Location: 2701 Airport Dr, Ypsilanti Township, Michigan, 48198, United States; 42°14′17.5″N 83°33′15.8″W
- Website: acmwillowrun.org

The American Center for Mobility is a 500-acre (200 ha) vehicular automation research center and federally designated automated vehicle proving ground located in Ypsilanti Township, Michigan.

== History ==
Founded in December 2017 on the site of the Willow Run manufacturing complex, the American Center for Mobility began as a joint initiative of the State of Michigan, partnering with Ann Arbor SPARK, Business Leaders for Michigan, the Michigan Department of Transportation, the Michigan Economic Development Corporation, the University of Michigan, and Ypsilanti Township as a way of accelerating autonomous vehicle research regionally and nationally.

Portions of the US Highway 12 alignment and ramps to the former manufacturing complex were repurposed for creation of a test track. Additional roadways and connections were constructed on the site of the complex.

On September 5, 2024, Michigan Technological University became the Engineering Services Provider.

== Features ==
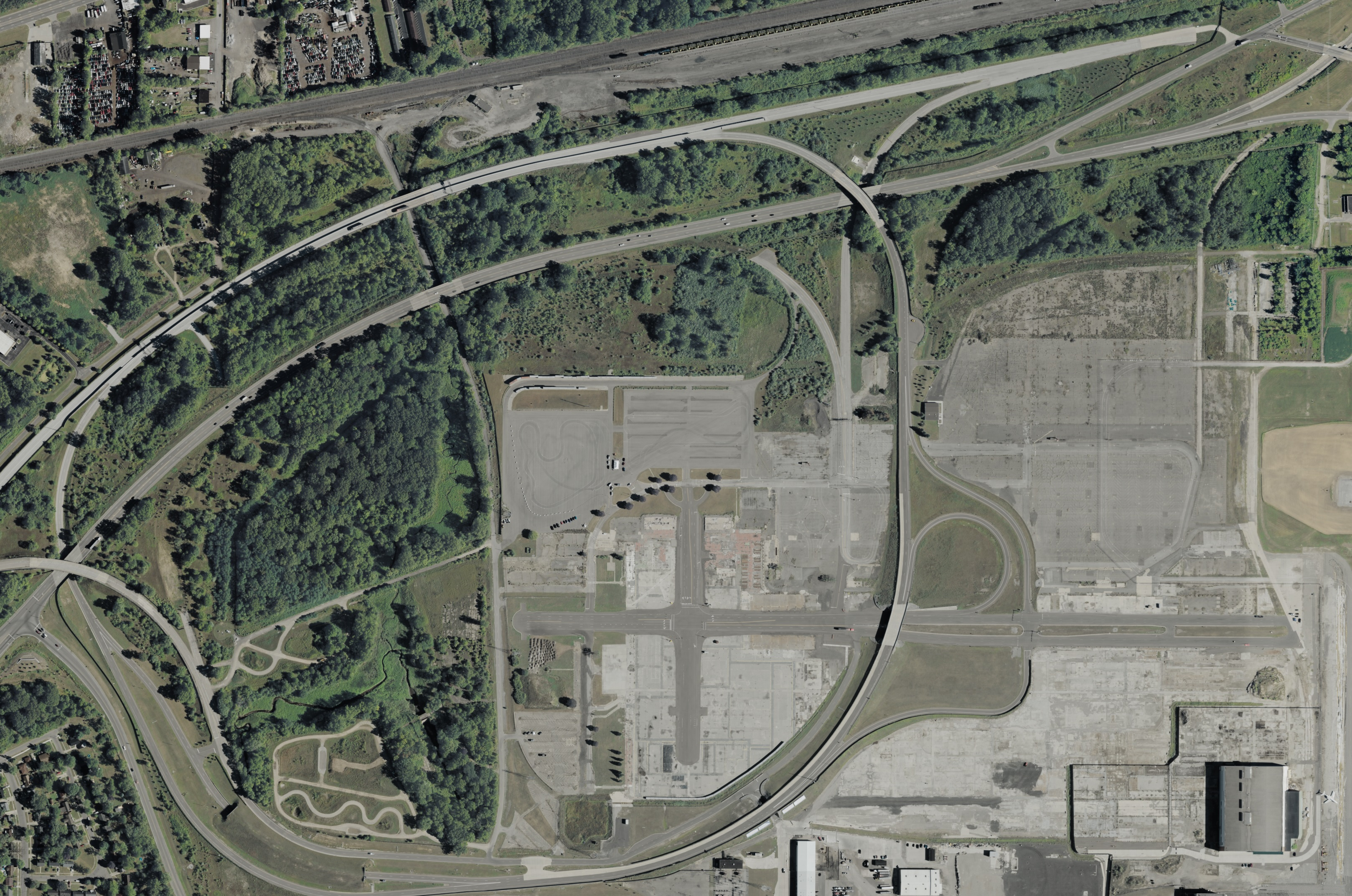
2022 orthophoto of the complex, showing the repurposed US-12 freeway infrastructure (top)

The test track includes a 700-foot (210 m) curved tunnel, 2.5-mile (4.0 km) highway loop, an off-road course, two double overpasses, along with various intersections and roundabouts. The track is branded as "Powered by Intertek" as Intertek serves as operations and maintenance partner.

In January 2020, the American Center for Mobility opened its Technology Park, designed to serve as an incubation hub for startups and offices onsite for partners, as well as event and demonstration space.

In addition to the test track and research center in Ypsilanti, the center also operates the Detroit Smart Parking Center in Detroit in partnership with Ford, Bedrock, and Bosch.
