= Ford Lake (Michigan) =

Fresh water reservoir in Michigan, U.S.

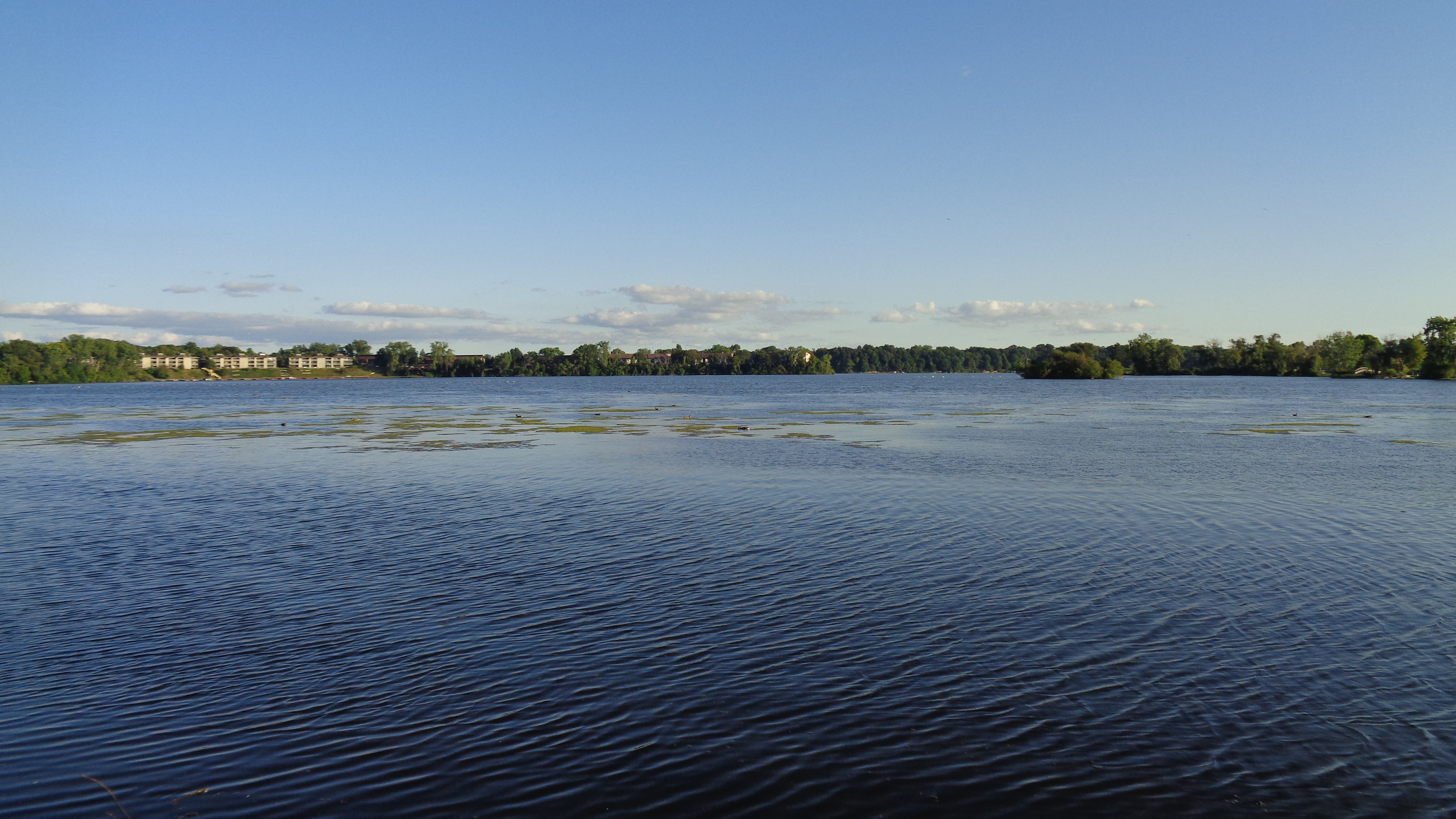
- Looking south from North Bay Park

- Location within the state of Michigan
- Location: Washtenaw County, Michigan
- Coordinates: 42°13′02″N 83°35′06″W
- Type: Fresh water Reservoir
- River sources: Huron River
- Basin countries: United States
- First flooded: 1931
- Surface area: 975 acres (395 ha)
- Max. depth: 30 ft (9.1 m)
- Surface elevation: 682 ft (208 m)
- Islands: Big Island Park and several unnamed islands
- Settlements: Ypsilanti; Ypsilanti Township

Ford Lake is a fresh water artificial reservoir located in Washtenaw County in the U.S. state of Michigan. The lake was created from the construction of Ford Lake Dam (originally known as Rawsonville Dam) along the Huron River in the early 1930s. The lake is named after business magnate Henry Ford.

The lake covers an area of 975 acres (395 ha) and has a maximum depth of 30 feet (9.1 m) near the eastern end. The lake continues the flow of the Huron River, beginning approximately at the Interstate 94 bridge crossing in the city of Ypsilanti and ends at Ford Lake Dam along Bridge Road in Ypsilanti Township. A short distance after the Ford Lake Dam, the Huron River continues into Belleville Lake, which itself is a reservoir created by the French Landing Dam and Powerhouse.

== Recreation ==
Ford Lake is a recreational site for boating, personal watercraft, canoeing/kayaking, and fishing. Portions of the Border-to-Border Trail run along Ford Lake and are popular among bicyclists. There are four public lakeshore parks within Ypsilanti Township: Ford Lake Park, Huron River Park, Loonfeather Point Park, and North Bay Park. The only boat launch for motorized vessels on the lake is within Ford Lake Park.

Common fish within Ford Lake include bullhead catfish, channel catfish, common carp, crappies, northern pike, smallmouth bass, suckers, sunfish, bluegill, walleye, white bass, and yellow perch. The lake was once used by the Michigan Department of Natural Resources to stock various fish, including tiger muskellunge, which are no longer present in Ford Lake. The largest fish caught in Ford Lake is a common carp recorded in the state's Master Angler Entries at 36.25 inches (97.08 cm) long.

== Health concerns ==
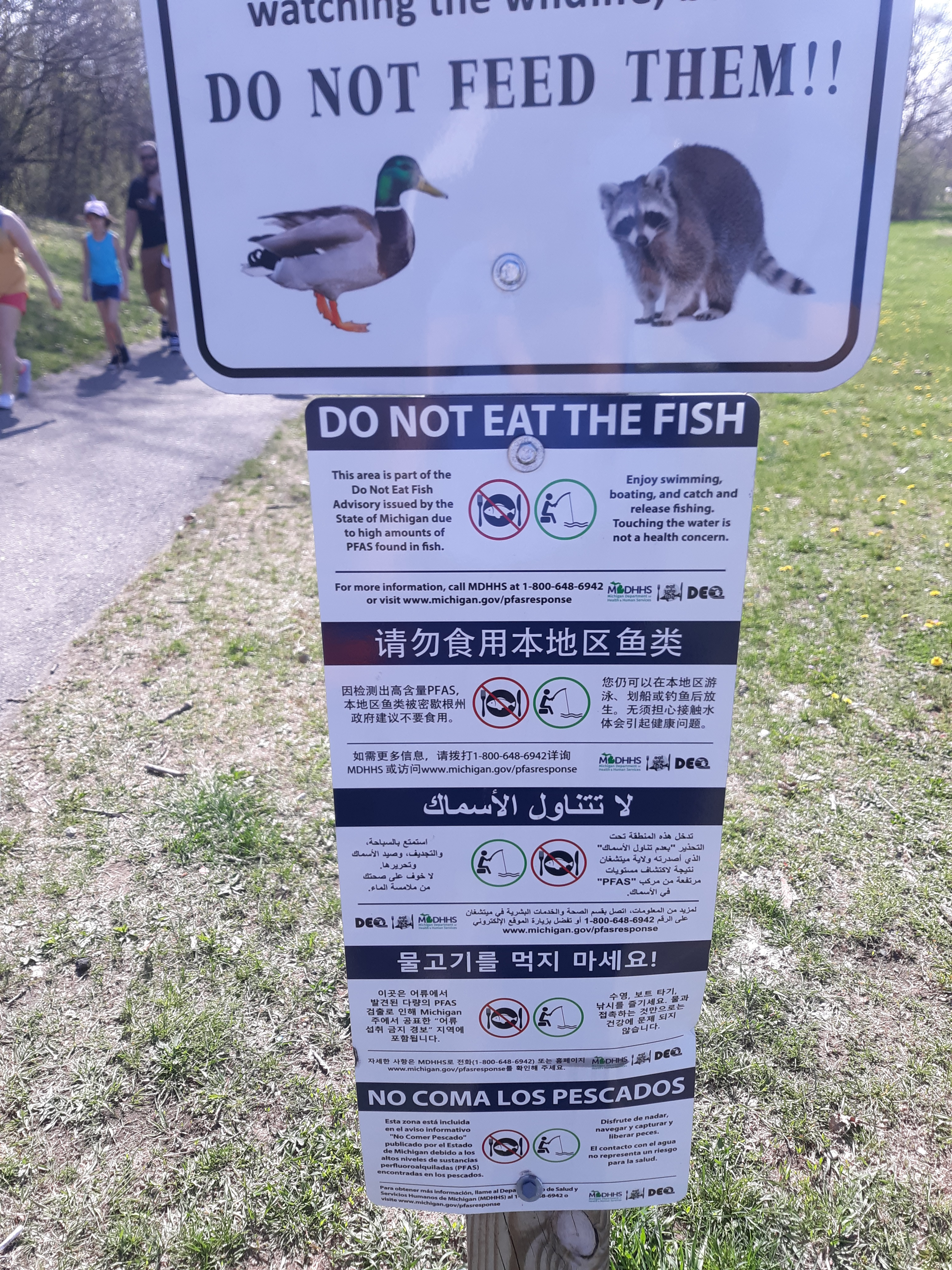
"Do not eat the fish" advisory posting along North Bay Park

Ford Lake often experiences algal blooms late in the summer, and the lake water is therefore frequently tested to assess for the presence of harmful algal blooms. The Washtenaw County Health Department has issued advisories in the past based on high levels of toxic cyanobacteria that may pose negative health effects to humans through inhalation of water droplets, swallowing of contaminated water or by swimming in water with algal mats or paint-like appearance. The summertime algal blooms are linked to excessive dissolved phosphorus in the water, an important nutrient. Ford Lake has been the subject of study to determine how reservoir management can impact occurrence of algal blooms.

In August 2022, Ford Lake was included in a two-week "no contact with water" advisory for portions of the Huron River by the Michigan Department of Health and Human Services. A release of toxic hexavalent chromium into wastewater sourced from Tribar Industries, a manufacturer of car decorative trim elements, was reported on August 1. However, further investigation suggested that less chromium had been released through the discharge than had been originally reported, and that it was predominantly trivalent chromium. Water sampling by the Michigan Department of Health and Human Services did not identify detectable levels of hexavalent chromium in the majority of sites tested, and none had levels high enough to threaten human health, resulting in the lifting of the advisory.

Ford Lake has been identified as a site of significant per- and polyfluoroalkyl substance (PFAS) contamination. As of 2025, the Eat Safe Fish Guide published by the Michigan Department of Health and Human Services recommends no consumption of any fish species from this lake ("do not eat"). Consumption advisories have been in place for portions of the Huron River since 2018 relating to PFAS contamination, and prior to this for polychlorinated biphenyls (PCBs) and mercury. Similar to mercury, PFAS, a group of related synthetic chemicals used in the production of fire-fighting foam, non-stick cookware and other products, accumulate in fish fillet meat, and were found at highest concentrations in the internal organs in a study conducted regionally that included Ford Lake.
