= Rawsonville, Michigan =

- Unincorporated community
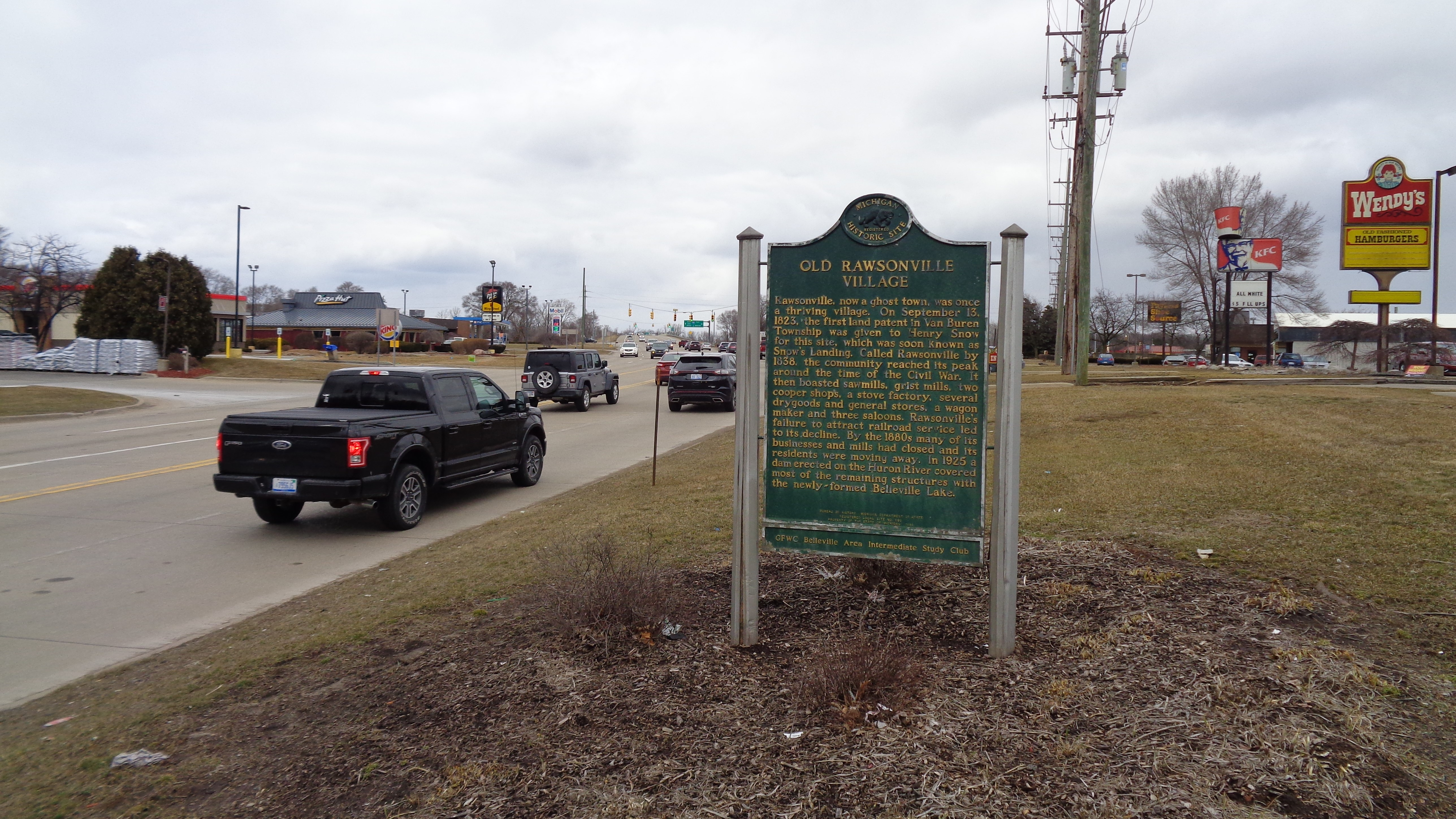
- Historic marker along Rawsonville Road

- Location within the State of Michigan Location within the United States
- Coordinates: 42°12′55″N 83°33′06″W
- Country: United States
- State: Michigan
- Counties: Washtenaw and Wayne
- Townships: Van Buren and Ypsilanti
- Elevation: 709 ft (216 m)
- Time zone: UTC-5 (Eastern (EST))
  - Summer (DST): UTC-4 (EDT)
- ZIP code(s): 48111 (Belleville); 48198 (Ypsilanti)
- Area code: 734
- GNIS feature ID: 635675

Old Rawsonville Village Informational Designation
- Interactive map of Old Rawsonville Village Informational Designation

Michigan State Historic Site
- Designated: October 27, 1983

Rawsonville is an unincorporated community on the boundary of Washtenaw County and Wayne County in the U.S. state of Michigan. Small parts of the historic community of Rawsonville lie under Belleville Lake, which is an artificial reservoir created in 1925 when the Eastern Michigan Edison Company built the French Landing Dam and Powerhouse along the Huron River. Often it is claimed that most if not all of the Historic Town was flooded, however this is only partly true.

Rawsonville was dedicated as a Michigan State Historic Site on October 27, 1983.

Rawsonville from the southern bank of the Huron River, circa 1890.

== History ==
In 1800, the first settler Henry Snow came to this location which was original called Snow's Landing. In 1825, Amariah Rawson and his family arrived at the village.The community plat, as Michigan City by Amariah Rawson and two others, was filed on January 7, 1836. After a group of neighbors petitioned the State Legislature asking that the name be changed to Rawsonville, on March 22, 1839, the act formally changing the name to Rawsonville was passed. On November 14, 1838, The Van Buren post office was moved to Rawsonville and assumed that name.

By the Civil War era, the village was doing well, with a grist mill, saw mill, a stove factory, and a wagon maker. With the building of the railroad, the community was bypassed, hurting the industries there.

On October 25, 1895, the post office was closed. It reopened on November 20, 1895, only to close again on February 28, 1902. By 1900, there were few residents. In 1925, the Detroit Edison company began constructing the French Landing hydroelectric dam on the Huron River and parts of the land around the community became submerged in the new Belleville Lake. There is a historical marker in front of the McDonald's on Rawsonville Road and across from Grove Road mentioning this, although erroneously stating "Most of the town" was under the lake. The modern community of Rawsonville still exists on land west of the original settlement, and with a commercial district on most of the original settlement's land, with only small portions of the community now being under Belleville Lake.
