= Ypsilanti Charter Township, Michigan =

Ypsilanti Township, Michigan
- Charter township
- Charter Township of Ypsilanti
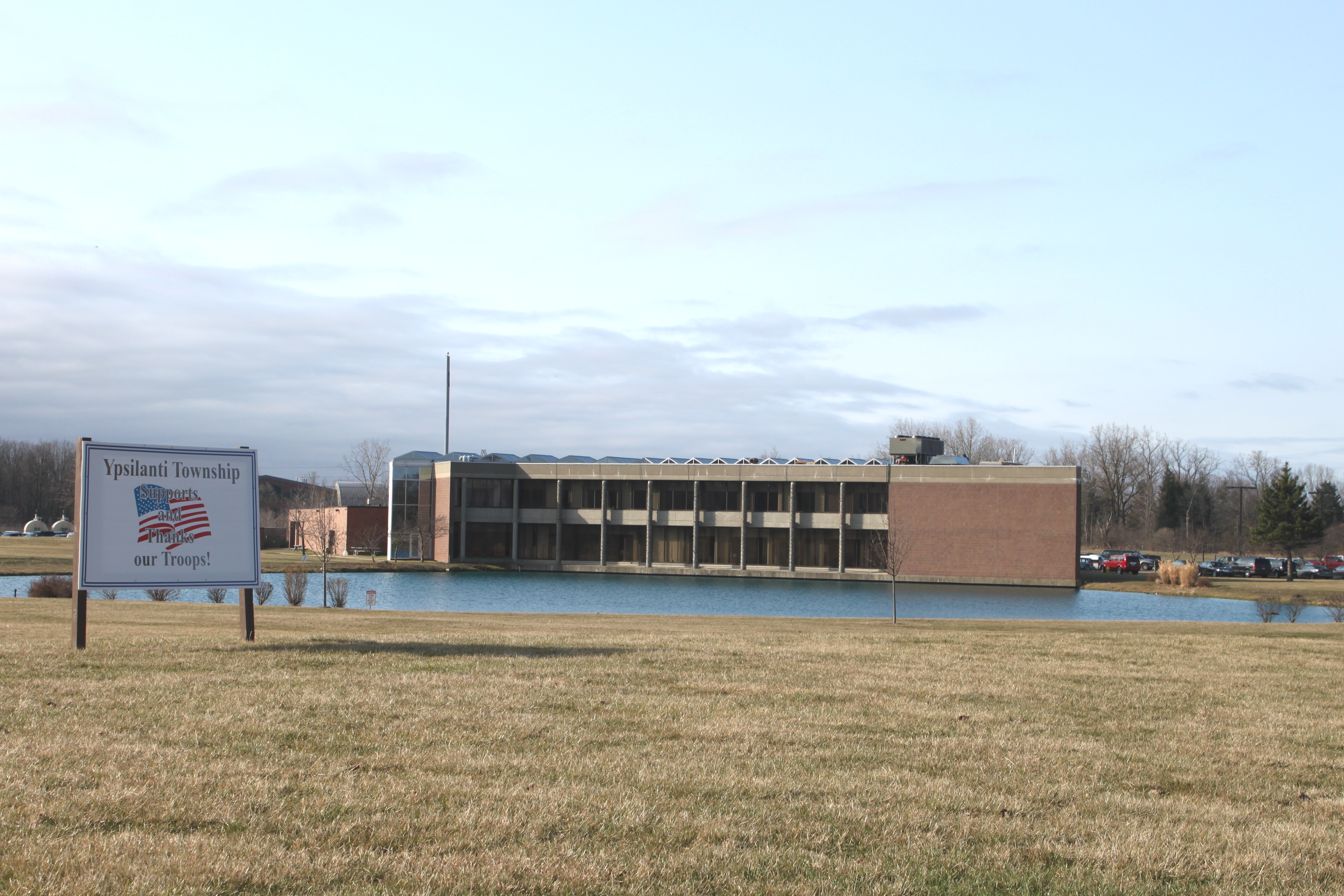
- Ypsilanti Township Civic Center

- Seal

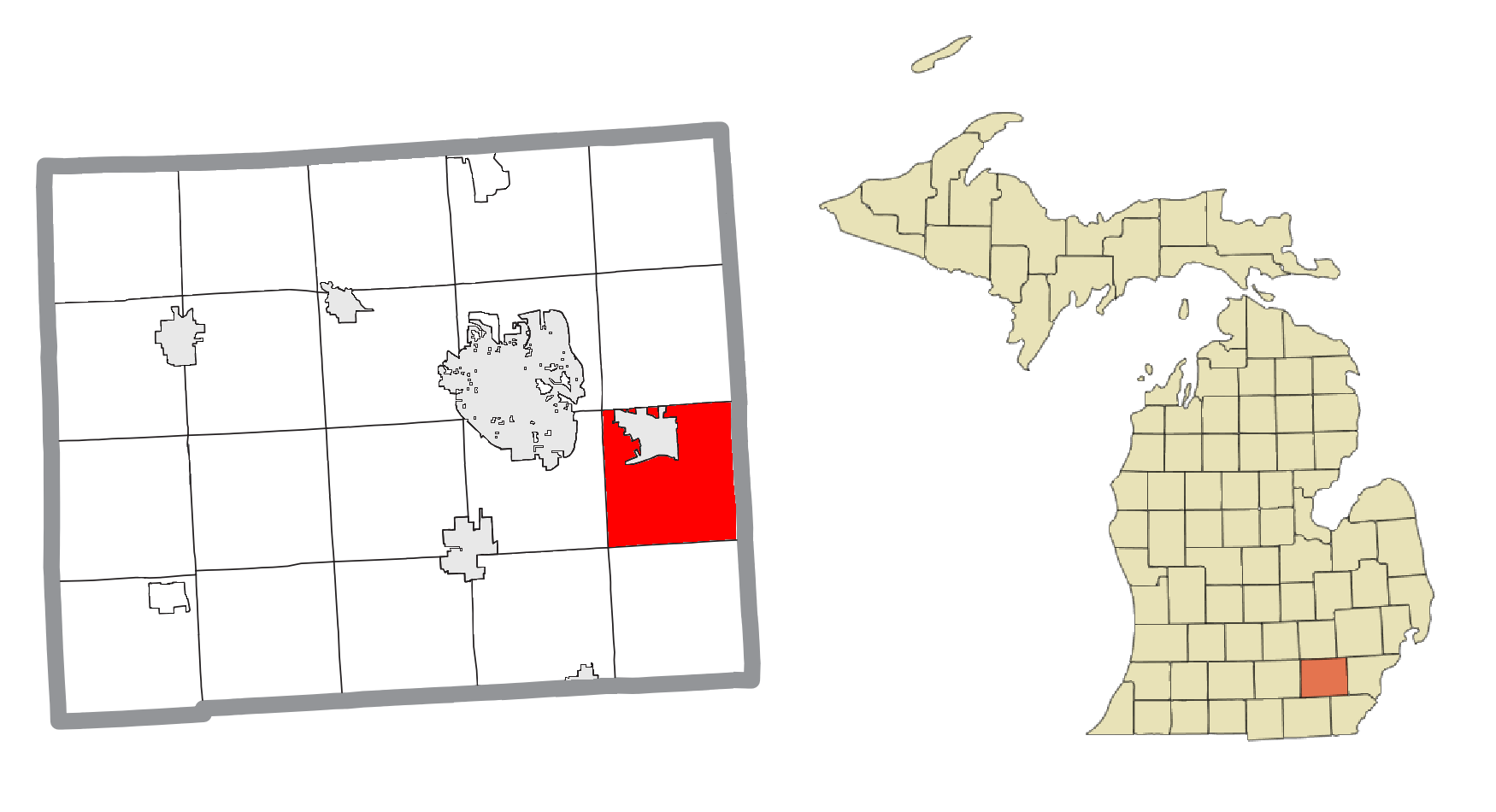
- Location within Washtenaw County

- Location within the state of Michigan Location within the United States
- Coordinates: 42°13′44″N 83°35′32″W
- Country: United States
- State: Michigan
- County: Washtenaw
- Established: 1827

Government
  - Supervisor: Brenda Stumbo
  - Clerk: Heather Jarrell Roe

Area
  - Total: 31.72 sq mi (82.15 km^{2})
  - Land: 29.93 sq mi (77.52 km^{2})
  - Water: 1.79 sq mi (4.64 km^{2})
- Elevation: 725 ft (221 m)

Population (2020)
  - Total: 55,670
  - Density: 1,860/sq mi (718.1/km^{2})
- Time zone: UTC−5 (EST)
  - Summer (DST): UTC−4 (EDT)
- ZIP code(s): 48111 (Belleville); 48197, 48198 (Ypsilanti)
- Area code: 734
- FIPS code: 26-89160
- GNIS feature ID: 1627301
- Website: Official website

Ypsilanti Charter Township is a charter township of Washtenaw County, in the state of Michigan. The population was 55,670 at the 2020 census. The city of Ypsilanti is mostly surrounded by the township, but the two are administered autonomously.

== Communities ==
- Eastlawn is an unincorporated community located within the township just east of the city limits of Ypsilanti near the junction of U.S. Route 12 and Interstate 94 at 42°14′08″N 83°35′17″W.
- Rawsonville is an unincorporated community located along the eastern border of the township at 42°12′55″N 83°33′06″W. The community is located along the Huron River and Belleville Lake and also extends to the east in Van Buren Township in Wayne County.
- Willow Run is an unincorporated community located within the township at 42°15′26″N 83°34′28″W. It was named after the Willow Run, which is a small stream and tributary of the Huron River. It is the site of Willow Run Airport. In 1943, the federal government constructed a bomber plant, which was operated by Henry Ford during World War II. A community named Willow Village was constructed to house the workers of the facility and their families, and it was also given a post office until the bomber plant closed on June 30, 1945.
- Woodgruff's Grove is a former community that was settled in 1823 by Ohio native Benjamin Woodruff. A post office operated in Woodgruff's Grove from May 9, 1825, to January 28, 1828. At the time, the community was administratively part of Wayne County when Ypsilanti Township was created in 1827. Washtenaw County was created in 1829 within the Michigan Territory. The community became part of the village of Ypsilanti when it incorporated in 1832.

== Geography ==
According to the U.S. Census Bureau, the township has a total area of 31.72 square miles (82.15 km^{2}), of which 29.93 square miles (77.52 km^{2}) is land and 1.79 square miles (4.64 km^{2}) (5.64%) is water.

Ford Lake Dam is located in the eastern part of the township. Ford Lake is within the township along the Huron River, and Paint Creek also runs through the township. The Border-to-Border Trail runs through the township along the Huron River.

=== Major highways ===
- I-94 runs east–west through the township and forms part of the boundary with the city of Ypsilanti.
- US 12 (Michigan Avenue) enters the township in the northeast corner and runs concurrently with I-94 through most of the township.
- M-17 (Washtenaw Avenue) begins at US 12 and runs through the township, in and out of the city of Ypsilanti.

== Demographics ==
As of 2020 Ypsilanti Township had a population of 55,670. The racial and ethnic makeup of the population was 53.5% white, 30.7% black or African American, 0.4% Native American, 2.9% Asian, 0.04% Pacific Islander, 3.05% from some other race and 9.3% from two or more races. 6.6% were Hispanic or Latino of any race.

As of the census of 2024, there were 23,521 households residing in the township, out of which 22.2% had children under the age of 18 living with them, 34.4% were married couples living together, 33.3% had a female householder with no partner present, and 24.2% had a male householder with no partner present. The average household size was 3.11. There were 24,485 housing units.

The median income for a household in the township was $69,716, and the median income for a family was $89,148. 14.8% of the population were below the poverty line, including 24.8% of those under age 18 and 10.3% of those age 65 or over.

== Economy ==
Cargo airline Kalitta Air is headquartered at Willow Run Airport in the township.

== Education ==
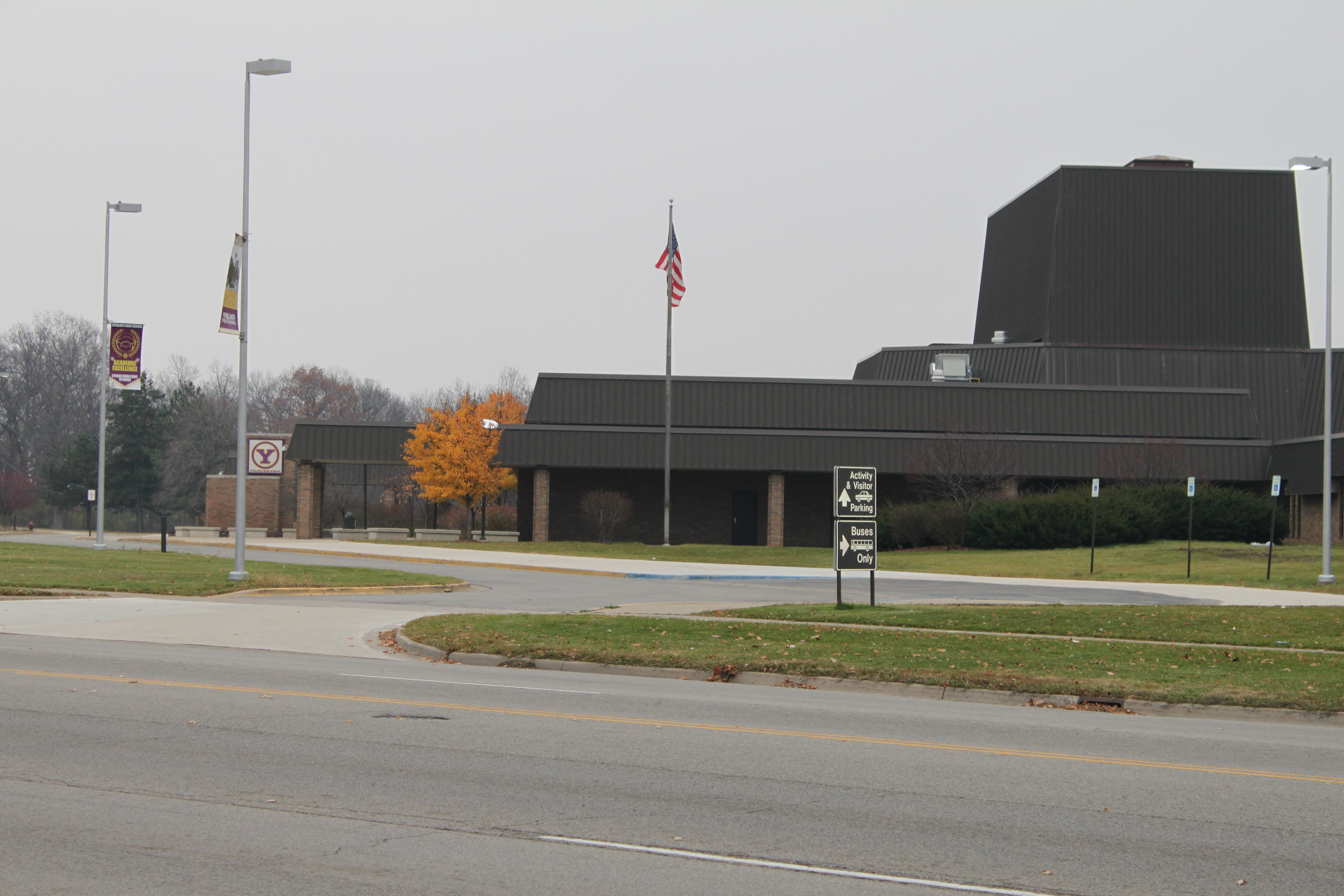
Ypsilanti High School is located within the township.

Ypsilanti Charter Township is served by two separate public school districts. The southern section of the township approximately south of Ford Lake is served by Lincoln Consolidated School District in Augusta Charter Township. The northern portion of the township, including the autonomous city of Ypsilanti, is served by Ypsilanti Community Schools. Portions of the township were also served by Willow Run Community Schools until it was consolidated into Ypsilanti Community Schools in 2013. Ypsilanti Community High School is located within the township.

Global Educational Excellence, based in Ann Arbor, operates the Global Tech Academy (PreK–5) in the township.

== Government ==
Ypsilanti Charter Township is governed by a seven-member Board of Trustees, consisting of a Supervisor, a Clerk, a Treasurer, and four at-large Trustees.

The current members of the Ypsilanti Township Board of Trustees, as of March 2023, are:

- Supervisor: Brenda Stumbo
- Clerk: Heather Jarrell Roe
- Treasurer: Stan Elridge
- Trustee: Ryan Hunter
- Trustee: John P. Newman II
- Trustee: Gloria Peterson
- Trustee: Debbie Swanson

John B. Collins 14B District Court building

Ypsilanti Charter Township operates the John B. Collins 14B District Court to hear cases arising in the township as part of the Michigan district court system.

== Parks and recreation ==
Parks:

- Ford Heritage Park
- Ford Lake Park
- Hewens Creek Park
- North Bay Park
- Green Oaks Golf Course (Owned & operated by the Township)
- Pine View Golf Course
- Rolling Hills

Michigan Flight Museum (formerly Yankee Air Museum) is in the township.

== Notable people ==
- Edward P. Allen, politician.
- Martha Bablitch, Wisconsin Court of Appeals judge.
- Owen Cleary, Michigan Secretary of State.
- Amy Devers, furniture designer and television host.
- Clayton Eshleman, poet and translator.
- Carol Fox, figure skater.
- Ralph Gerganoff, architect.
- William H. Joslin, member of the Wisconsin State Assembly.
- Charles Kettles, Medal of Honor recipient.
- Bernard Kirk, American football player.
- Christian Longo - Murderer
- Shara Nova, singer and songwriter.
- Keith Simons, American football player.
- Larry Soderquist, Author and Professor of Law.
- David P. Weikart, psychologist.

== Images ==
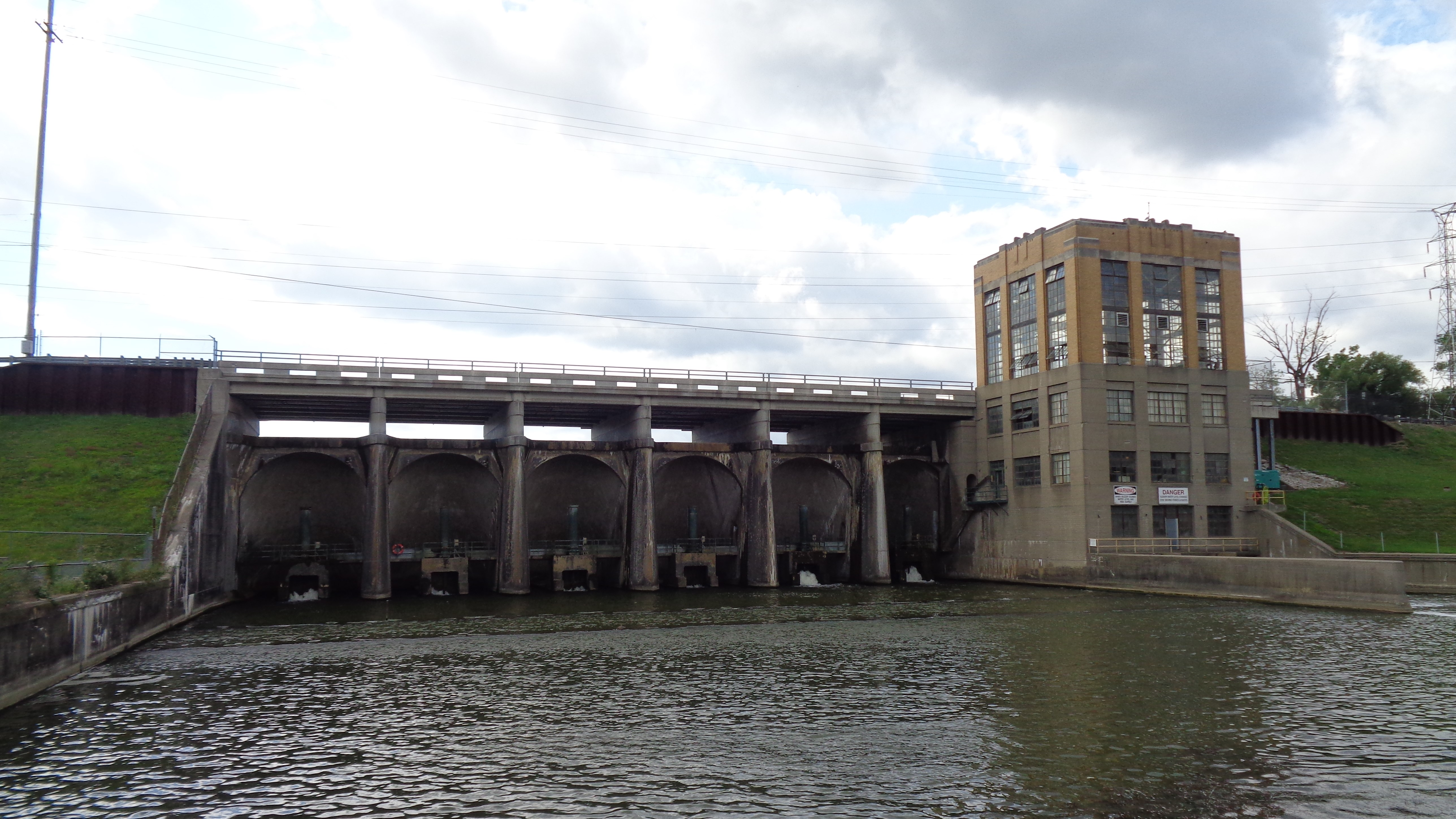
Ford Lake Dam along the Huron River

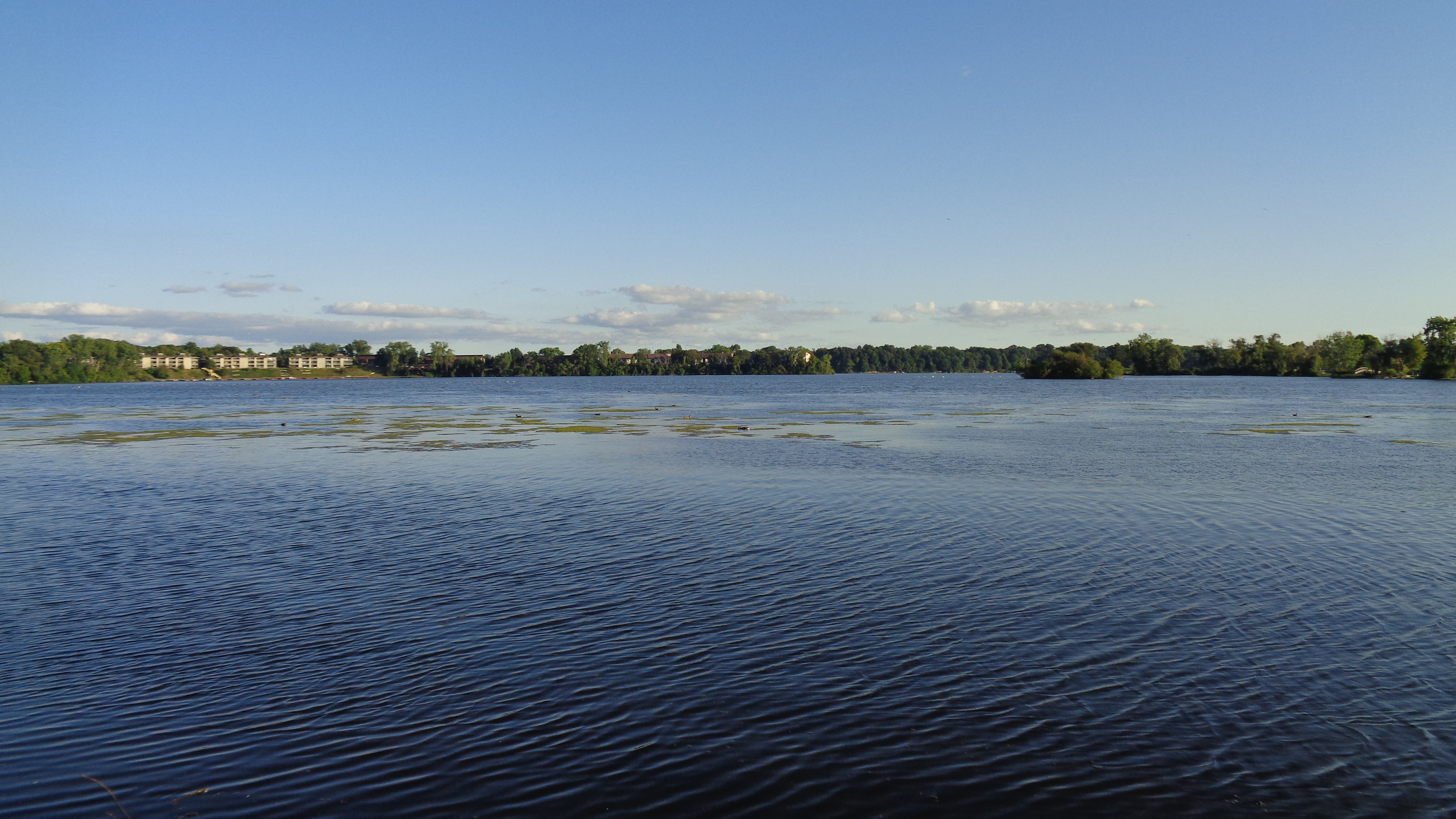
Ford Lake from North Bay Park

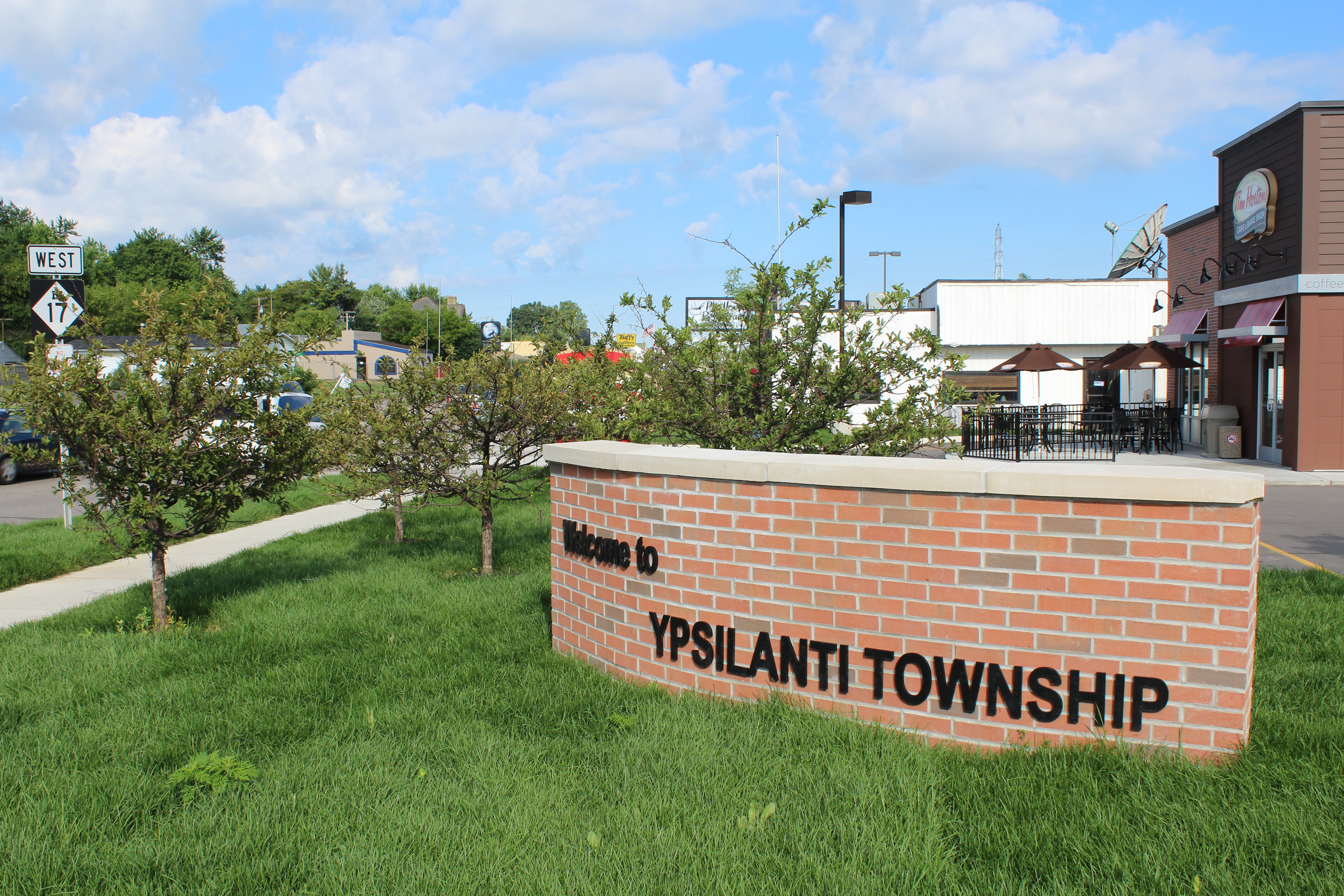
Welcome sign along M-17

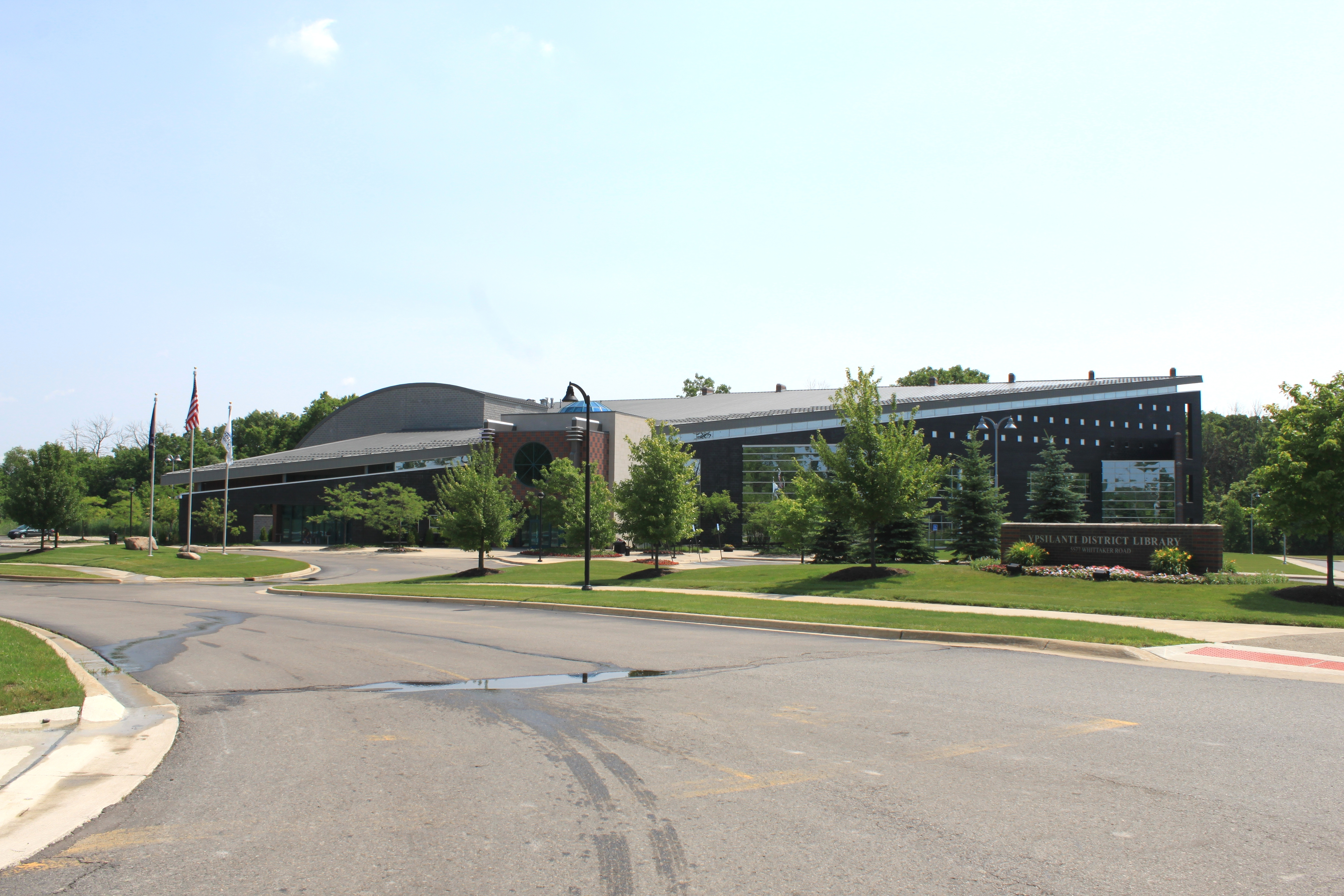
Ypsilanti District Library
