= Belleville Lake =

Fresh water reservoir in Michigan, U.S.

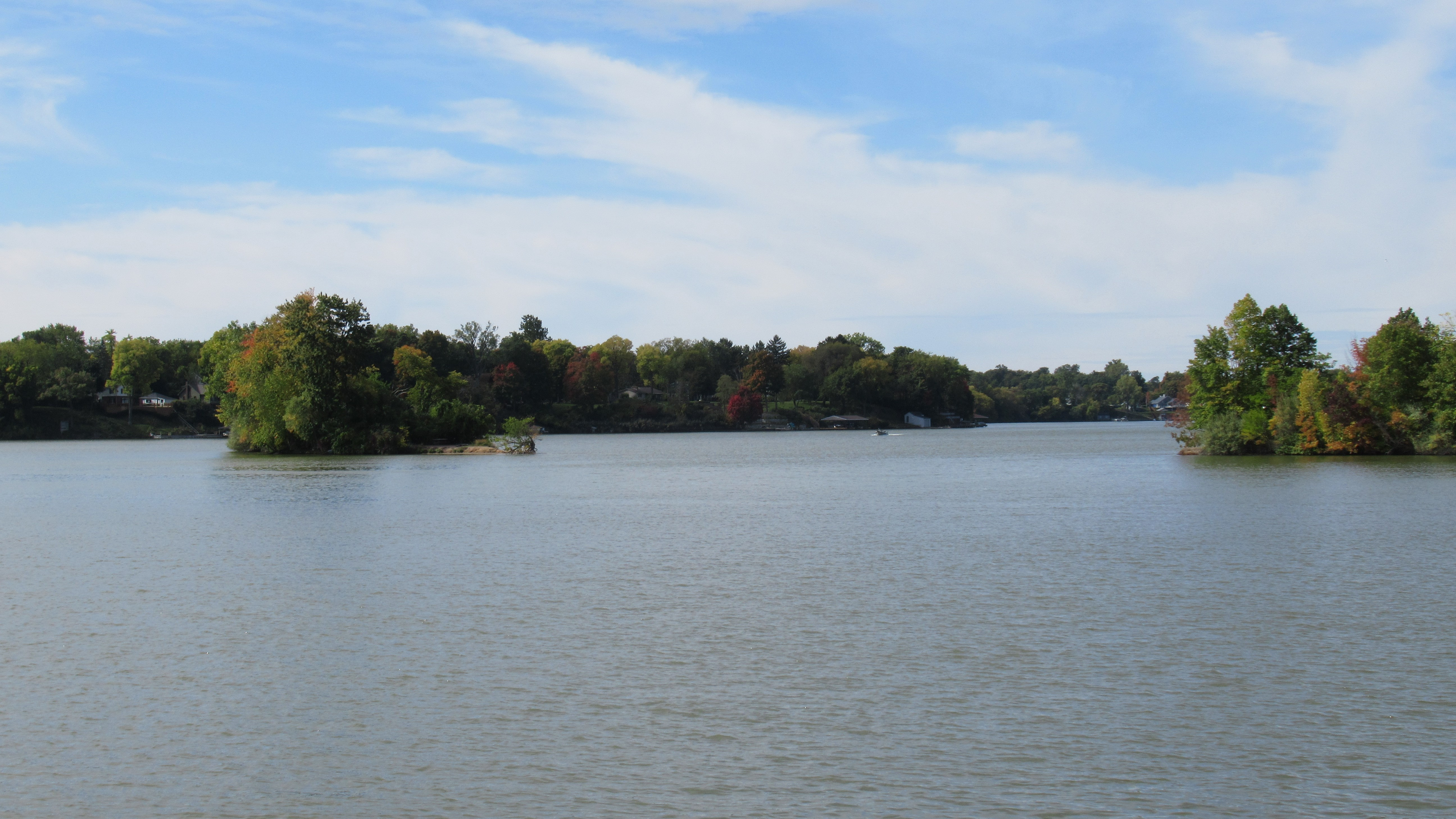
- View from Horizon Park in Belleville

- Location within the state of Michigan Belleville Lake (the United States)
- Location: Washtenaw and Wayne County, Michigan
- Coordinates: 42°12′43″N 83°29′47″W
- Type: Fresh water
- River sources: Huron River
- Basin countries: United States
- First flooded: 1925
- Surface area: 1,270 acres (5.1 km^{2})
- Max. depth: 30 feet (9.1 m)
- Surface elevation: 650 feet (200 m)
- Islands: 3 (unnamed)
- Settlements: Belleville; Van Buren Township; Ypsilanti Township

Belleville Lake is a fresh water artificial reservoir located mostly within Wayne County in the U.S. state of Michigan. A very small portion extends west into Washtenaw County. The lake was created from the construction of the French Landing Dam and Powerhouse along the Huron River in 1925.

== History ==
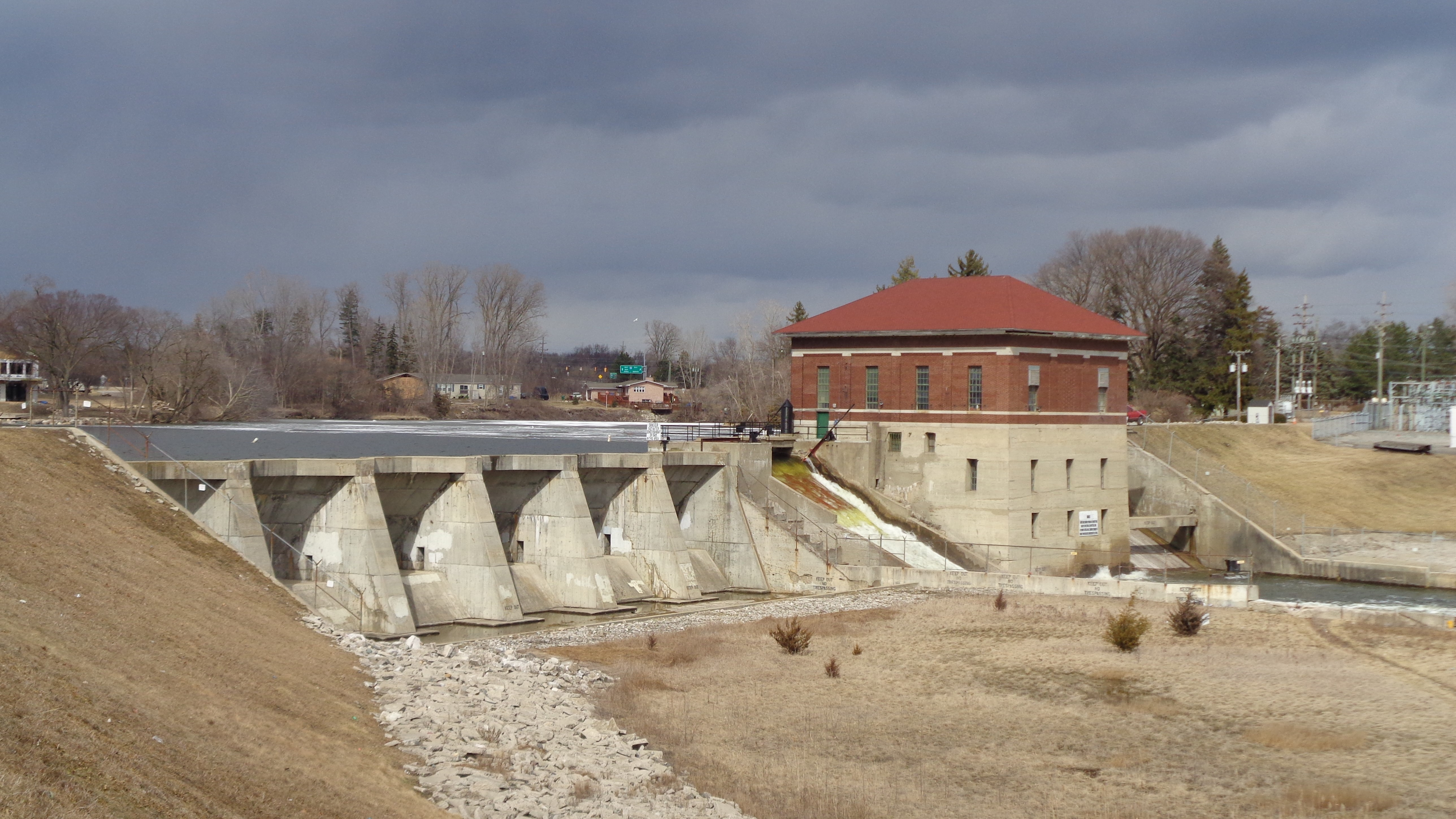
The construction of the French Landing Dam and Powerhouse in 1925 led to the creation of Belleville Lake.

Belleville Lake is an artificial reservoir created by the hydroelectric French Landing Dam and Powerhouse in 1925. The lake was originally named Edison Lake, because the dam was constructed by the Detroit Edison Company. When the lake was created, it flooded part of the historic community of Rawsonville, which had few remaining structures and residents by this time. The historic community was dedicated as a Michigan State Historic Site on October 27, 1983. A historic marker was erected at the intersection of Rawsonville Road and Grove Road. The community of Rawsonville continues to exist as an unincorporated community with little relation to the historic community, besides its geographic position.

The French Landing Dam and Powerhouse is also listed as a Michigan State Historic Site, as is the John C. Stellwagen House. The lakefront Stellwagen House lost a portion of its property when the lake was flooded, but the original house remains standing.

=== Belleville Bridge ===
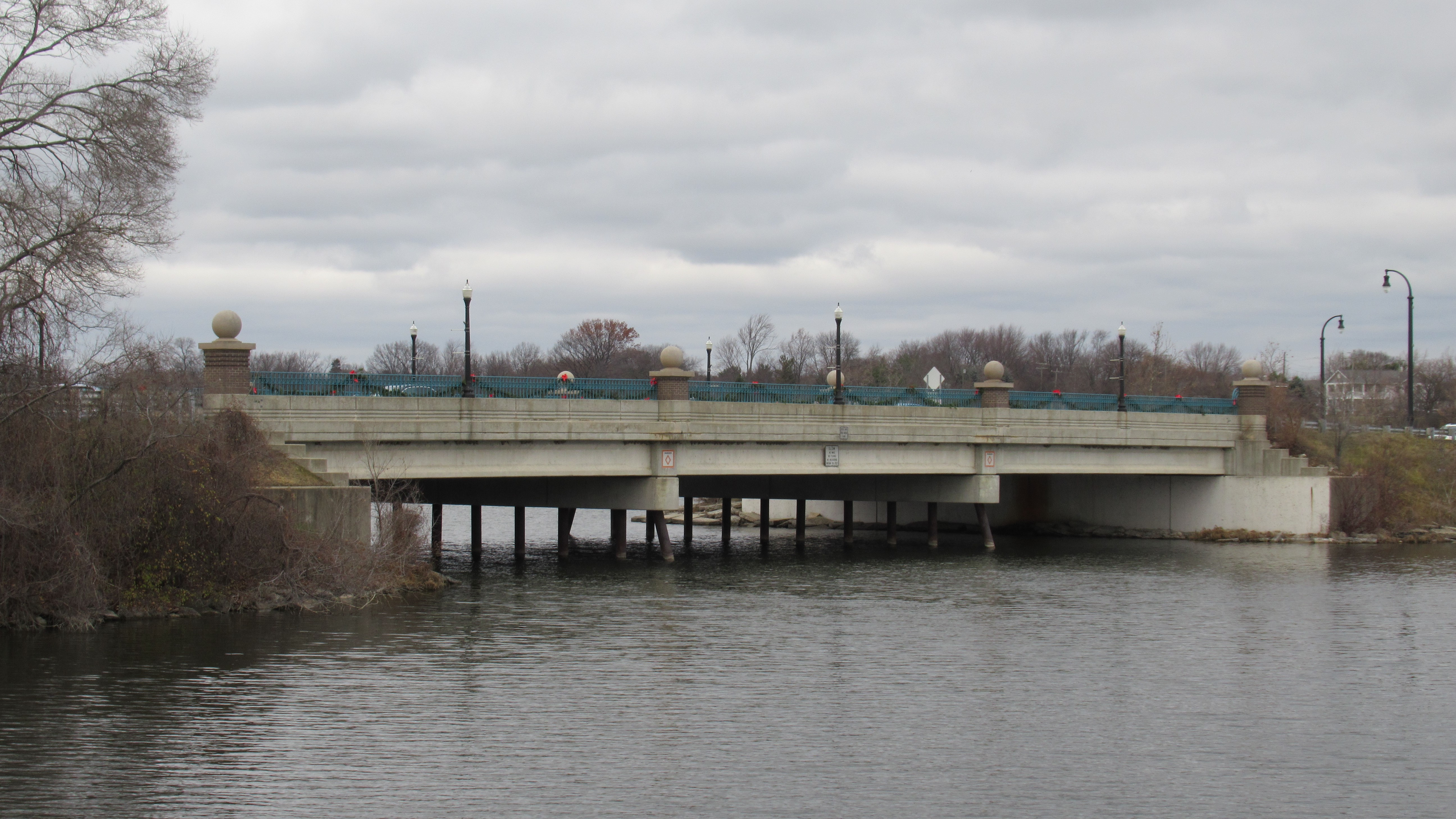
Constructed in 1985, Belleville Bridge replaced an earlier bridge built in 1925.

Belleville Bridge was built in 1925 to carry Belleville Road across the newly formed lake. It was 120 feet (36.6 m) long and was one of the state's few riveted camelback pony truss bridges. Located just north of the community center, it was vitally important for residents of the area to access U.S. Route 12 and eventually Interstate 94 connecting to Detroit. In 1985, a larger roadway was needed for the growing community and traffic. At the time, the bridge was a potential candidate for entry on the National Register of Historic Places, but its replacement was necessary and forfeited any future historic designations. The original bridge was dismantled and sold to Kent County. It replaced the former Burroughs Street Bridge and currently spans the Flat River in Vergennes Township just north of the city of Lowell at 42°57′56.6″N 85°21′03.6″W. The new Belleville Bridge shares no resemblance and is now a four-lane, three-span reinforced concrete bridge located at 42°12′41.7″N 83°29′33.9″W.

=== Rotenone usage ===
In May 1973, thousands of fish in Belleville Lake were accidentally killed by the use of rotenone upstream in Ford Lake. Rotenone was used in Ford Lake to eliminate fish populations in a restocking effort. Ford Lake Dam was blocked off to prevent the poison from entering Belleville Lake, but the dam accidentally opened and released the poison. This resulted in the unplanned killing of up to 350,000 pounds (160,000 kg) of fish in Belleville Lake, and the state issued a temporary ban on the use of rotenone in the future.

In September 1973, Belleville Lake was partially drained as a plan to poison an increasing common carp population that was viewed as an invasive species for competing with native fish species. The lake was going to be drained, because less poison would be needed with less water. Ford Lake Dam was closed to eliminate the water supply to Belleville Lake, and the French Landing Dam was opened further to allow the water to drain. The lake was only drained by about one-third before engineering failures caused two bridges to crack and a gas line to rupture due to the ground shifting. The water level was not lowered any further. The shallower western edge of Belleville Lake was drained completely, uncovering decades of debris and garbage, which included old safes, firearms, automobiles, sunken boats, and a historic cement roadway that was constructed in 1904. The original poisoning project was voted to continue after a brief hiatus. Rotenone was airdropped by helicopter for the first time in the state to eliminate the carp population. It resulted in a large cleanup project that resulted in 850,000 pounds (390,000 kg) of dead fish carcasses, of which 95% were carp. The bridges were repaired, and the lake was soon refilled and stocked with more native game species of fish.

== Geography ==
Belleville Lake is an elongated reservoir that flows about 8 miles (12.9 km) through the central portion of Van Buren Township. The lake has a surface area of 1,270 acres (5.14 km^{2}) and sits at an elevation of 650 feet (200 m) above sea level. Belleville Lake mostly follows the original path of the Huron River, which serves as its primary inflow and outflow.

The lake has a maximum depth of 30 feet (9.1 m) near the eastern end but much shallower toward the western end. The lake continues the flow of the Huron River, beginning approximately at Rawsonville Road and meandering to Haggerty Road—roughly parallel south of Interstate 94. Ford Lake is a short distance upstream from Belleville Lake, which itself is a reservoir created by the Ford Lake Dam. The two lakes are separated by a short one-mile (1.6 km) stretch of the Huron River.

Belleville Lake is mostly surrounded by Van Buren Township within Wayne County. The city of Belleville is centered along the lake on the southern coast. The Michigan Department of Natural Resources also lists a very small portion of Belleville Lake crossing the county line at Rawsonville Road into Ypsilanti Township to the west.

== Activities ==
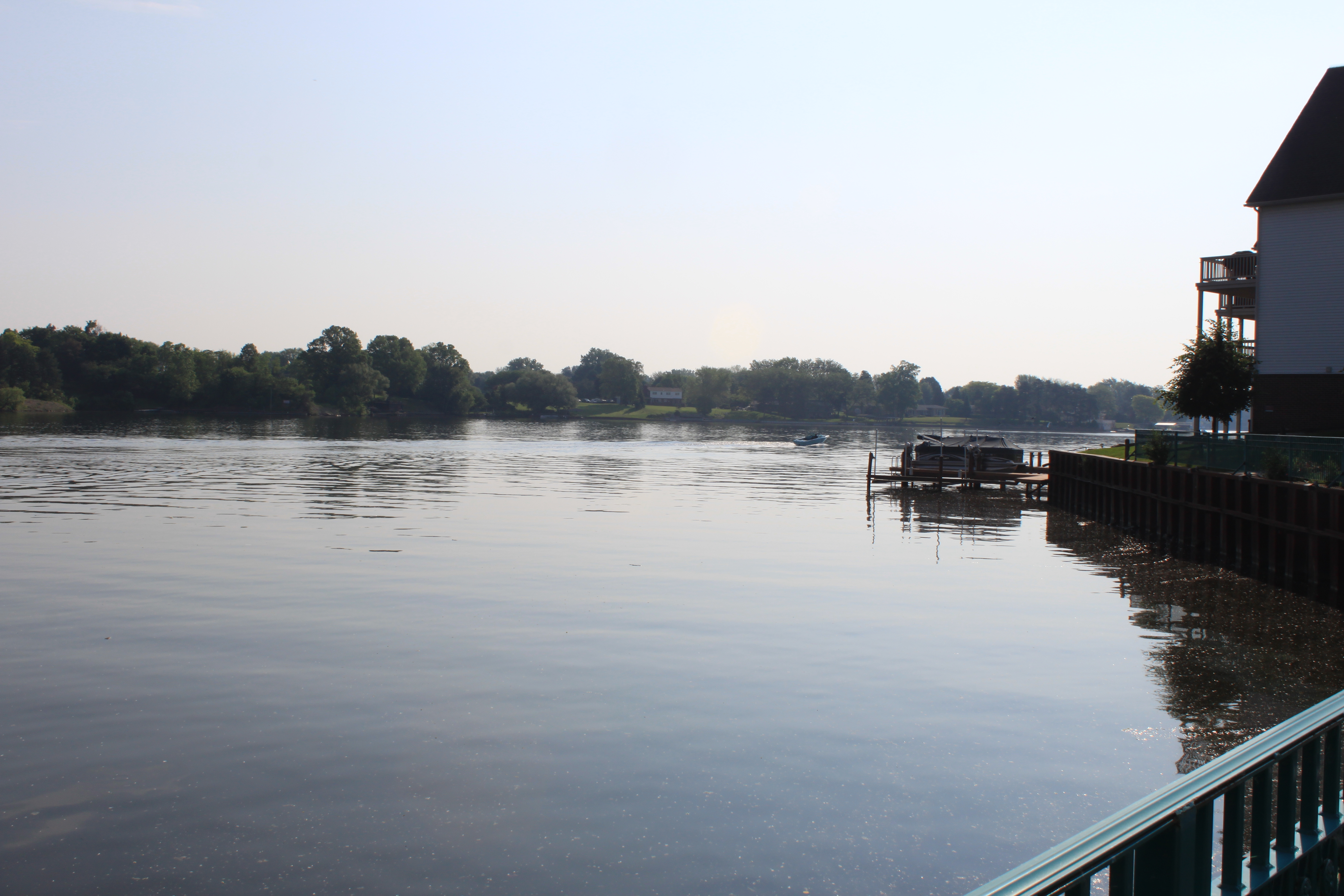
Belleville Lake seen from Doane's Landing

Belleville Lake is a popular recreational site for boating, personal watercraft, canoeing/kayaking, and fishing. There are several lakefront parks, including Doane's Landing, French Landing Park, Horizon Park, and Van Buren Park. The Michigan Department of Natural Resources operates two public boat launches along the lake. The Belleville Lake–West access point is located on Rawsonville Road along the lake's western edge, and the Belleville Lake–East access point is located along the eastern-central portion of the lake on East Huron River Drive. The two boat launches are administered and maintained by Maybury State Park to the north.

Belleville Lake is a very popular fishing destination. Common fish species include bluegill, catfish (black bullhead, brown bullhead, yellow bullhead, and channel catfish), common carp, black crappie, large and smallmouth bass, muskellunge (including tiger muskellunge), northern pike, rock bass, silver bass, suckers, sunfish, walleye, and yellow perch. Many of these species are routinely stocked and monitored by the Michigan Department of Natural Resources. Belleville Lake is one of the few inland lakes in southeastern Michigan with an established population of the invasive round goby, which are now integrated into the lake's ecosystem and spreading to other areas of the Huron River. Smaller fish routinely caught or netted include brook silverside, emerald shiner, golden shiner, logperch, spotfin shiner, spottail shiner, and white perch. According to one study, bluegill amounted to 61% of total catches on the lake.

Belleville Lake has numerous listings on the state's Master Angler Entries. The largest fish listed is a common carp at 36.50 inches (92.71 cm) with other similarly sized carps also listed. A channel catfish is also listed at 33.25 inches (84.46 cm) and a largemouth bass at 25.75 inches (65.41 cm).

The Border-to-Border Trail also passes along Belleville Lake and connects to Michigan's Iron Belle Trail, which follows along the Huron River and connects to Wayne County's eastern communities along the Detroit River.

=== Health concerns ===
Belleville Lake often experiences algal blooms late in the summer, which must be frequently tested to determine their level of toxicity. The Michigan Department of Health and Human Services monitors the water quality and issues advisories when the bacteria levels in the water may pose a health threat. Most algal blooms are green algae and pose no threat, but accumulating cyanobacteria and perfluorooctanesulfonatecan (PFOS) can result in harmful algal blooms that can have negative health affects. When this bacteria is present, prolonged contact with the water is not advised, although occasional contact with PFOS is not considered a health concern. Regardless of water quality, swimming is not a common recreational activity on the lake. The only public swimming area is a small beachfront within Van Buren Park on the north shores of the lake.

When algae levels reach a high enough level to pose a threat, a "Do Not Eat" fish advisory is issued and posted at all access points along the lake. Boating and fishing are still allowed, but fishermen are advised to catch and release only.
