= Van Buren Township, Michigan =

American township in Michigan

- Charter township
- Van Buren Charter Township
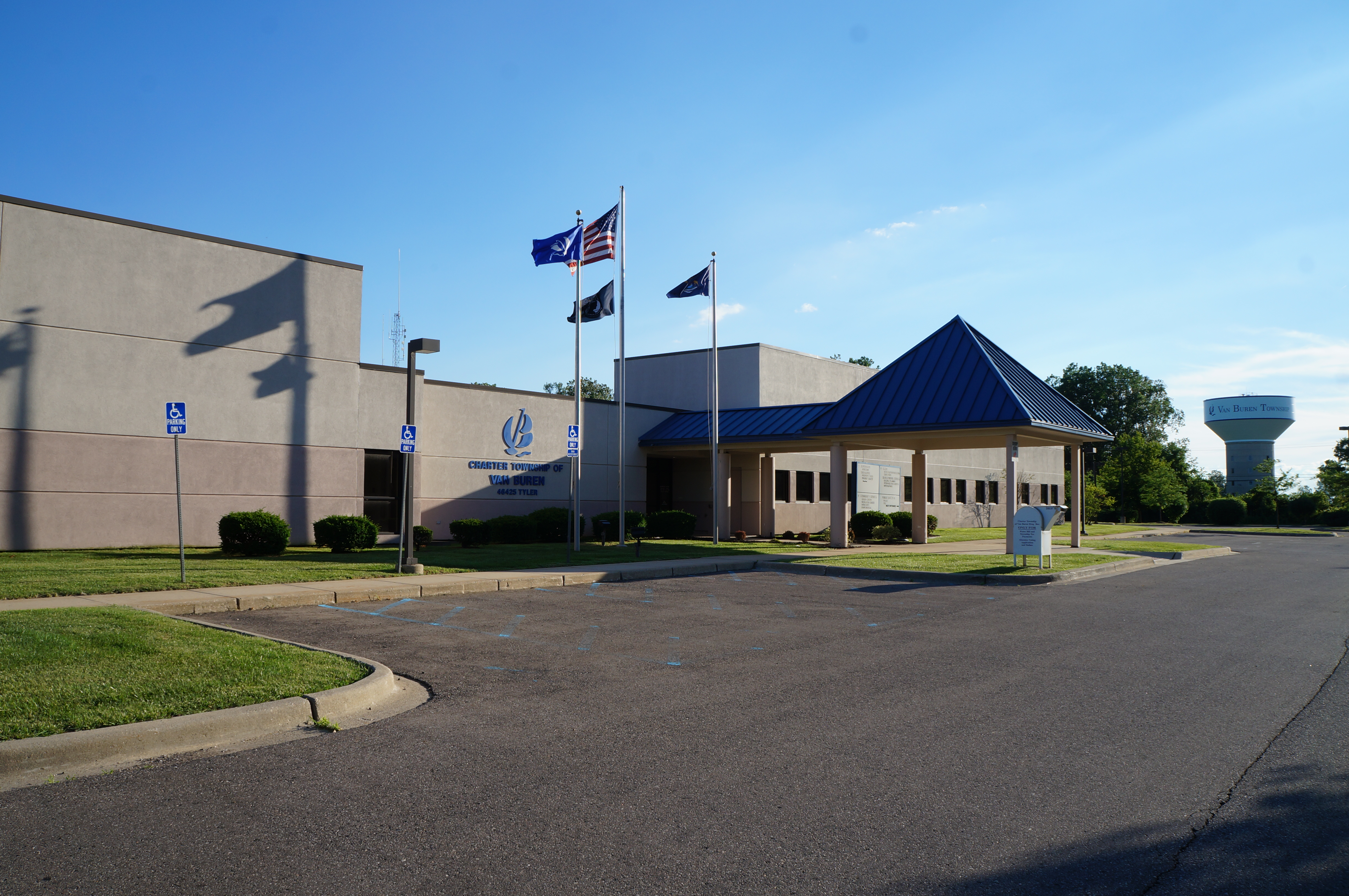
- Van Buren Township Hall

- Location within Wayne County

- Location within the state of Michigan Location within the United States
- Coordinates: 42°13′14″N 83°29′15″W
- Country: United States
- State: Michigan
- County: Wayne
- Established: 1835

Government
  - Supervisor: Kevin McNamara
  - Clerk: Leon Wright

Area
  - Charter township: 36.06 sq mi (93.4 km^{2})
  - Land: 33.97 sq mi (88.0 km^{2})
  - Water: 2.09 sq mi (5.4 km^{2})

Population (2020)
  - Charter township: 30,375
  - Density: 894.2/sq mi (345.2/km^{2})
  - Metro: 4,285,832 (Metro Detroit)
- Time zone: UTC-5 (EST)
  - Summer (DST): UTC-4 (EDT)
- ZIP code(s): 48111 (Belleville); 48174 (Romulus); 48184 (Wayne)
- Area code: 734
- FIPS code: 26-81660
- GNIS feature ID: 1627189
- Website: Official website

Van Buren Township is a charter township in Wayne County in the U.S. state of Michigan. A western suburb of Detroit, Van Buren Township is located roughly 28 miles (45.1 km) southwest of downtown Detroit, and 17 miles (27.4 km) southeast of Ann Arbor. As of the 2020 census, the township had a population of 30,375. It surrounds, but is independent of, the city of Belleville, and locations within the township are often referred to as being in Belleville.

Belleville Lake is a principal geographic feature, and the township is also home to Willow Run Airport, which extends into neighboring Ypsilanti Township.

== Communities ==
- Belleville North is an unincorporated community located at 42°13′22″N 83°28′55″W just north of Interstate 94.
- Denton is an unincorporated community located in the northwest corner of the township at 42°15′28″N 83°31′27″W. The community was settled along the railway line as early as 1864, and it was platted in 1866. Denton had its own post office from February 28, 1870 until October 14, 1933.
- Edgewater Heights is an unincorporated community located along Belleville Lake just west of the city of Belleville at 42°12′14″N 83°30′43″W.
- French Landing is an unincorporated community located along the Huron River near the French Landing Dam and Powerhouse at 42°12′36″N 83°26′23″W. Originally settled along the railway line, French Landing had its own post office (named Frenchlanding) from February 25, 1896 until 1919.
- Rawsonville is a mostly historic unincorporated community located in the western portion of the township along the county line with Washtenaw County at 42°12′55″N 83°33′06″W. The community was settled as early as 1800 and was also referred to as Snow's Landing and Michigan City. Rawsonville had its own post office from November 14, 1838 until October 25, 1895 and again from November 20, 1895 until February 28, 1902.
- Roulo is an unincorporated community located just south of the city of Belleville at 42°11′24″N 83°29′00″W.

== History ==
In 1800, settler Henry Snow came and settled on what is now the border with Ypsilanti Township, Washtenaw County which was originally called Snow's Landing.

A settlement of the Huron River received a post office on May 7, 1834, with the name of West Huron and postmaster Scott Vining. The township was formed by the State in 1835 and was soon renamed for Martin Van Buren, then vice president of the US. The post office name was also changed. On November 14, 1838, the Van Buren post office was moved to Rawsonville and assumed that name. On October 25, 1895, the Rawsonville post office was closed, only to reopen on November 20, 1895, and to close again on February 28, 1902.

In 1925, the French Landing Dam and Powerhouse was put in place on the Huron River, placing some of the Rawsonville village under water of the new Belleville Lake, though most of the original land the town sat on is still above water.

The only visual sign of the historic community is a historical marker at the intersection Rawsonville and Grove Road.

== Geography ==
According to the United States Census Bureau, the township has a total area of 36.06 square miles (93.39 km^{2}), of which 33.97 square miles (87.98 km^{2}) is land and 2.09 square miles (5.4 km^{2}) (5.80%) is water.

== Demographics ==
=== Racial and ethnic composition ===
Van Buren Charter Township, Michigan – Racial and ethnic composition Note: the US Census treats Hispanic/Latino as an ethnic category. This table excludes Latinos from the racial categories and assigns them to a separate category. Hispanics/Latinos may be of any race.
| Race / Ethnicity (NH = Non-Hispanic) | Pop 2000 | Pop 2010 | Pop 2020 | % 2000 | % 2010 | % 2020 |
|---|---|---|---|---|---|---|
| White alone (NH) | 19,135 | 18,153 | 17,170 | 81.22% | 62.99% | 56.53% |
| Black or African American alone (NH) | 2,820 | 8,217 | 9,222 | 11.97% | 28.51% | 30.36% |
| Native American or Alaska Native alone (NH) | 115 | 132 | 76 | 0.49% | 0.46% | 0.25% |
| Asian alone (NH) | 438 | 716 | 759 | 1.86% | 2.48% | 2.50% |
| Native Hawaiian or Pacific Islander alone (NH) | 9 | 13 | 6 | 0.04% | 0.05% | 0.02% |
| Other race alone (NH) | 25 | 44 | 139 | 0.11% | 0.15% | 0.46% |
| Mixed race or Multiracial (NH) | 488 | 760 | 1,710 | 2.07% | 2.64% | 5.63% |
| Hispanic or Latino (any race) | 529 | 786 | 1,293 | 2.25% | 2.73% | 4.26% |
| Total | 23,559 | 28,821 | 30,375 | 100.00% | 100.00% | 100.00% |

=== 2000 census ===
As of the census of 2000, there were 23,559 people, 9,867 households, and 6,117 families residing in the township. The population density was 694.9 inhabitants per square mile (268.3/km^{2}). There were 10,417 housing units at an average density of 307.3 per square mile (118.6/km^{2}). The racial makeup of the township was 82.64% White, 12.03% African American, 0.54% Native American, 1.87% Asian, 0.04% Pacific Islander, 0.51% from other races, and 2.36% from two or more races. Hispanic or Latino people of any race were 2.25% of the population.

There were 9,867 households, out of which 29.8% had children under the age of 18 living with them, 45.5% were married couples living together, 11.7% had a female householder with no husband present, and 38.0% were non-families. 29.1% of all households were made up of individuals, and 3.6% had someone living alone who was 65 years of age or older. The average household size was 2.38 and the average family size was 2.96.

In the township the population was spread out, with 23.9% under the age of 18, 11.0% from 18 to 24, 36.2% from 25 to 44, 22.2% from 45 to 64, and 6.6% who were 65 years of age or older. The median age was 32 years. For every 100 females, there were 101.7 males. For every 100 females age 18 and over, there were 99.8 males.

The median income for a household in the township was $50,984, and the median income for a family was $60,561. Males had a median income of $44,867 versus $30,299 for females. The per capita income for the township was $24,820. About 4.4% of families and 6.3% of the population were below the poverty line, including 7.5% of those under age 18 and 6.1% of those age 65 or over.

== Transportation ==
=== Highways ===
- I-94
- I-275
- US 12
- Bus. US 12

=== Airport ===
- Willow Run Airport

== Economy ==
Auto parts maker Visteon is based in Van Buren Township. A factory for electric vehicle lithium iron phosphate batteries is under construction.

USA Jet Airlines has its headquarters on the grounds of Willow Run Airport and in the township.

== Gallery ==
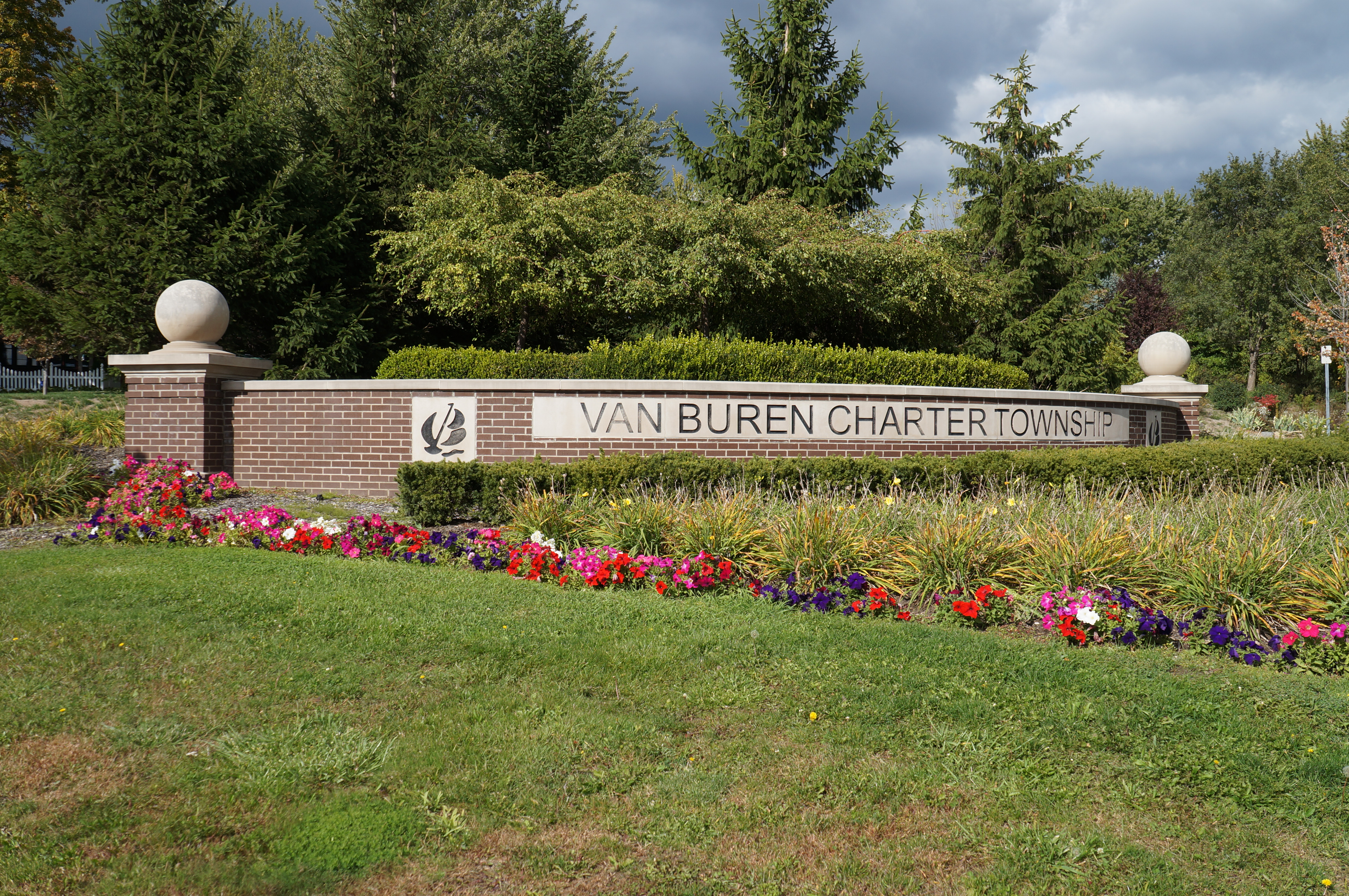
Van Buren Charter Township welcome sign

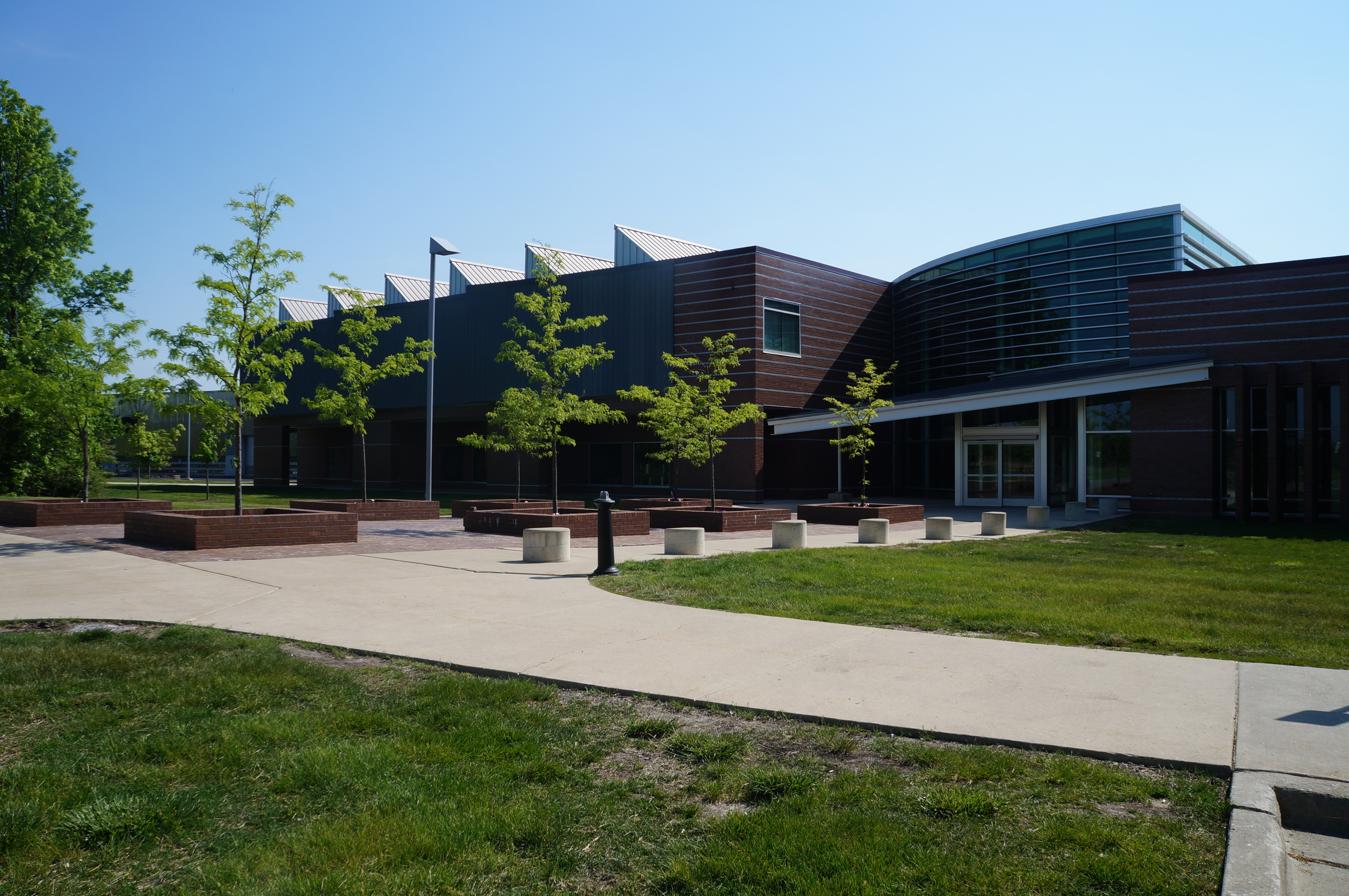
Wayne County Community College, Mary Ellen Stempfle University Center West

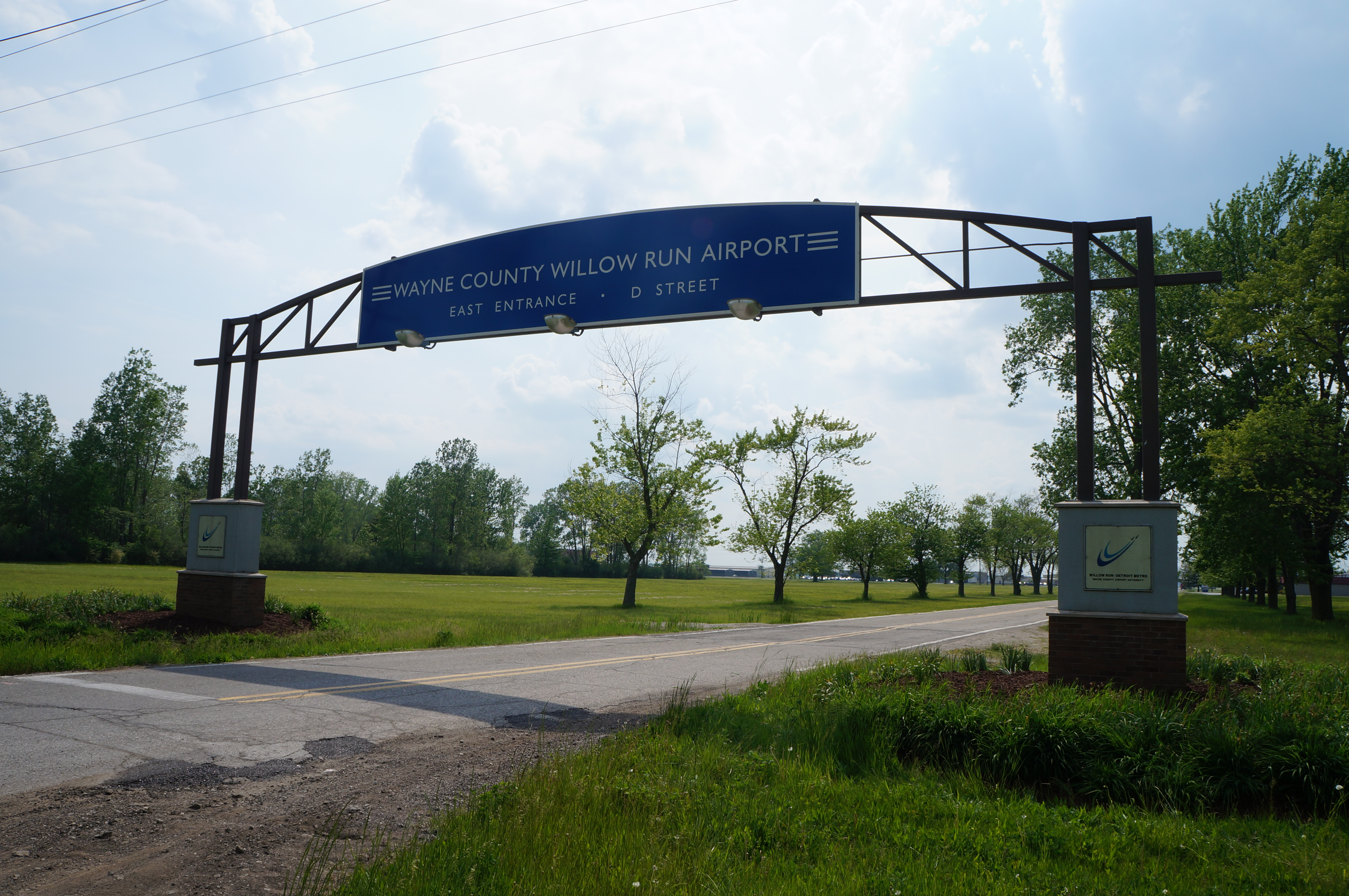
Willow Run Airport
