= National Strawberry Festival =

- “A weekend of fun for everyone!”

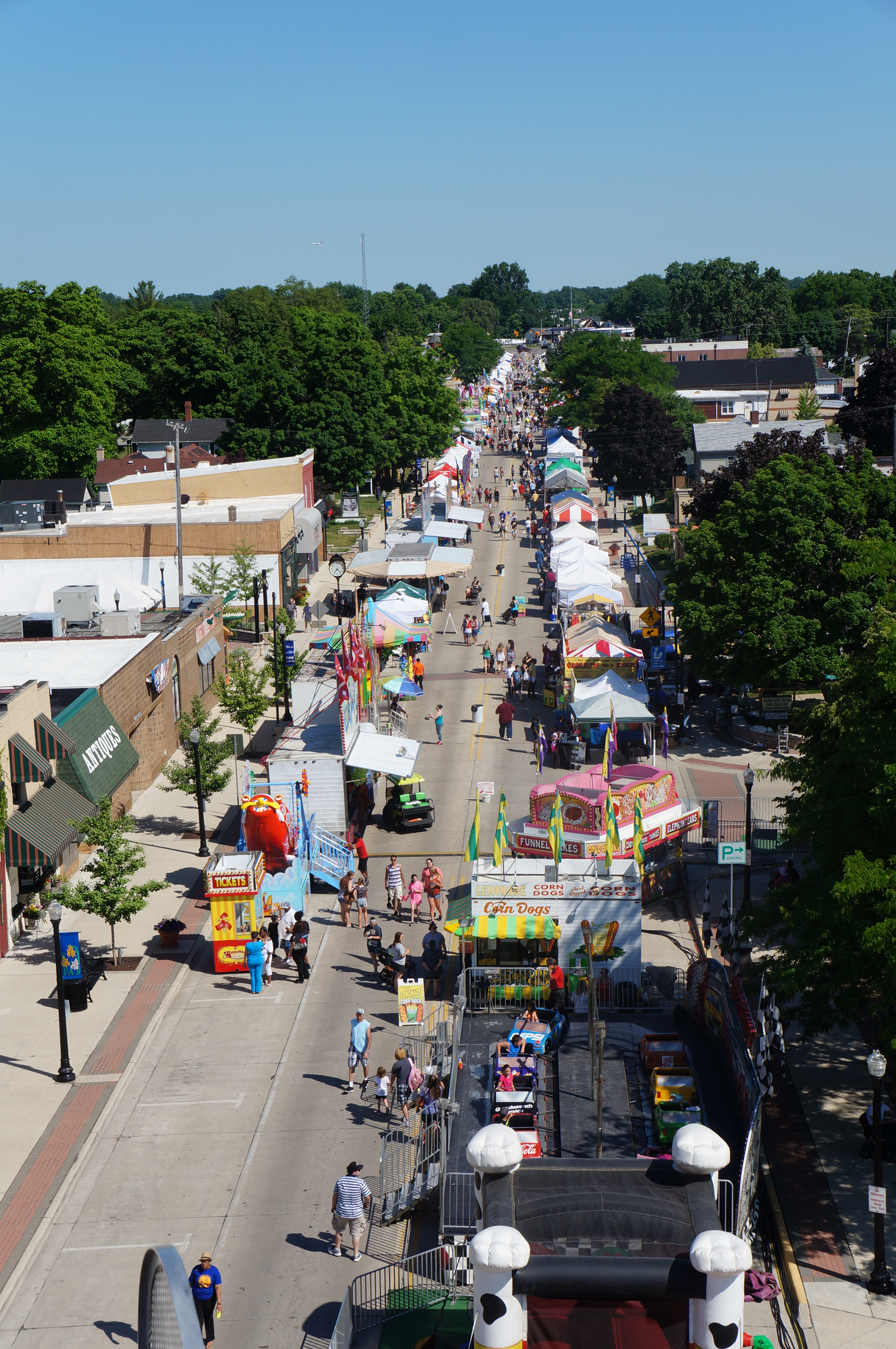
- Main Street from the Ferris wheel
- Genre: Festival
- Frequency: Annually, Father's Day Weekend
- Venue: Main Street, St. Anthony Catholic Church, Belleville Presbyterian Church, Trinity Episcopal Church, and Victory Park
- Location: Belleville, Michigan
- Coordinates: 42.207144°N 83.488502°W
- Country: United States
- Inaugurated: 1977
- Most recent: 2019
- Attendance: 200,000
- Sponsors: Meijer, Heritage Newspapers
- Website: nationalstrawberryfest.com

The National Strawberry Festival in Belleville, Michigan, established in 1977, began as a way for local farmers to celebrate their strawberry crops. Taking place over three days, held the third weekend in June, the festival offers many events for people of all ages. In collaboration with area churches and schools, some of the events include:

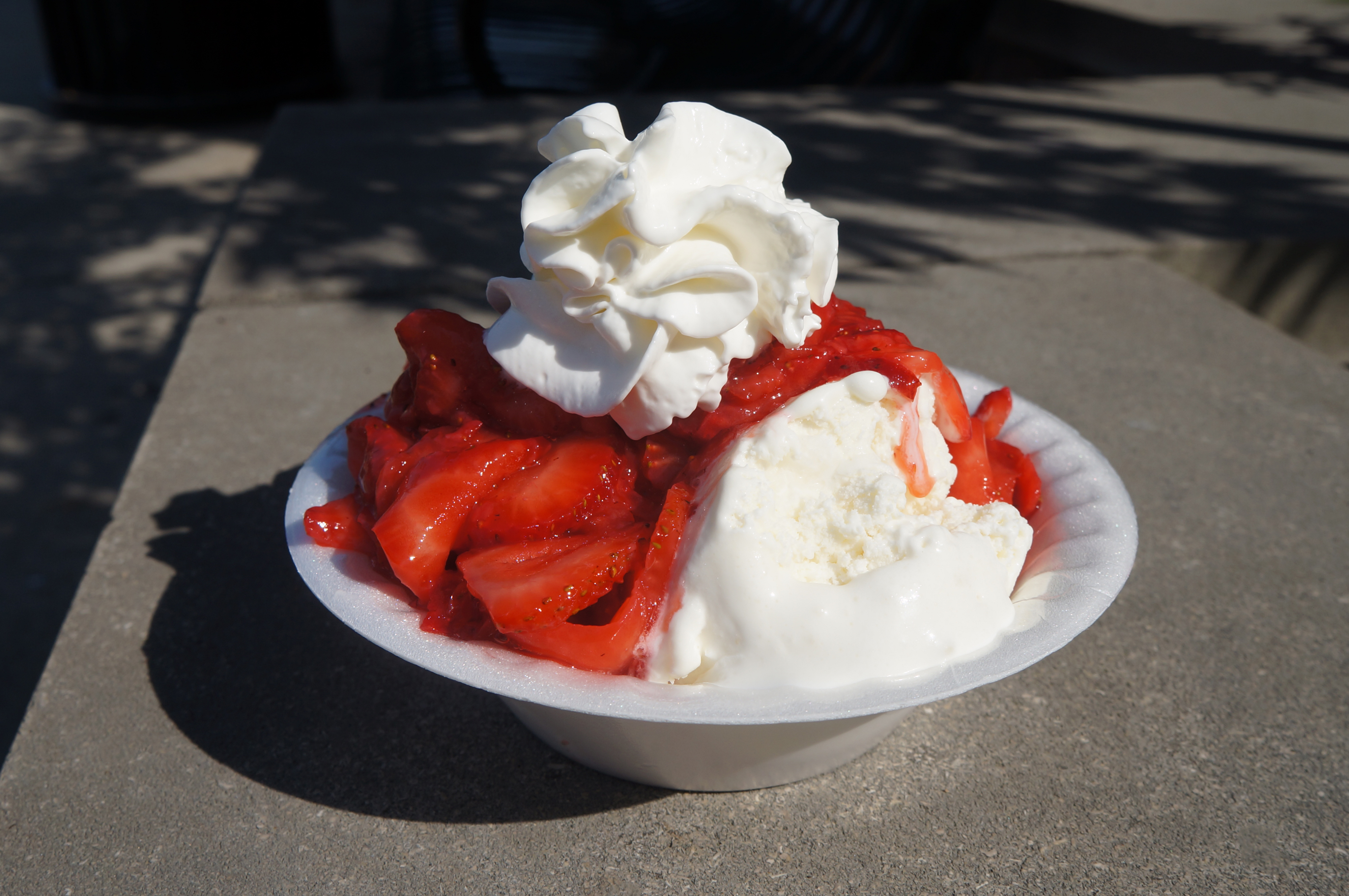
Strawberry Shortcake from Myrtle Lodge No. 89, F&AM

- Bingo
- Strawberry desserts
- Parade
- Car show
- "Strawberry Queen Pageant"
- Live entertainment

Each year the festival attracts over 200,000 people from Southeastern Michigan and farther.

This festival went on lifetime hiatus since 2020 caused by the COVID-19 pandemic and won't ever be resumed.

== See also ==
- List of strawberry topics
