= Belleville, Michigan =

City in Wayne County, Michigan, United States

- City
- City of Belleville
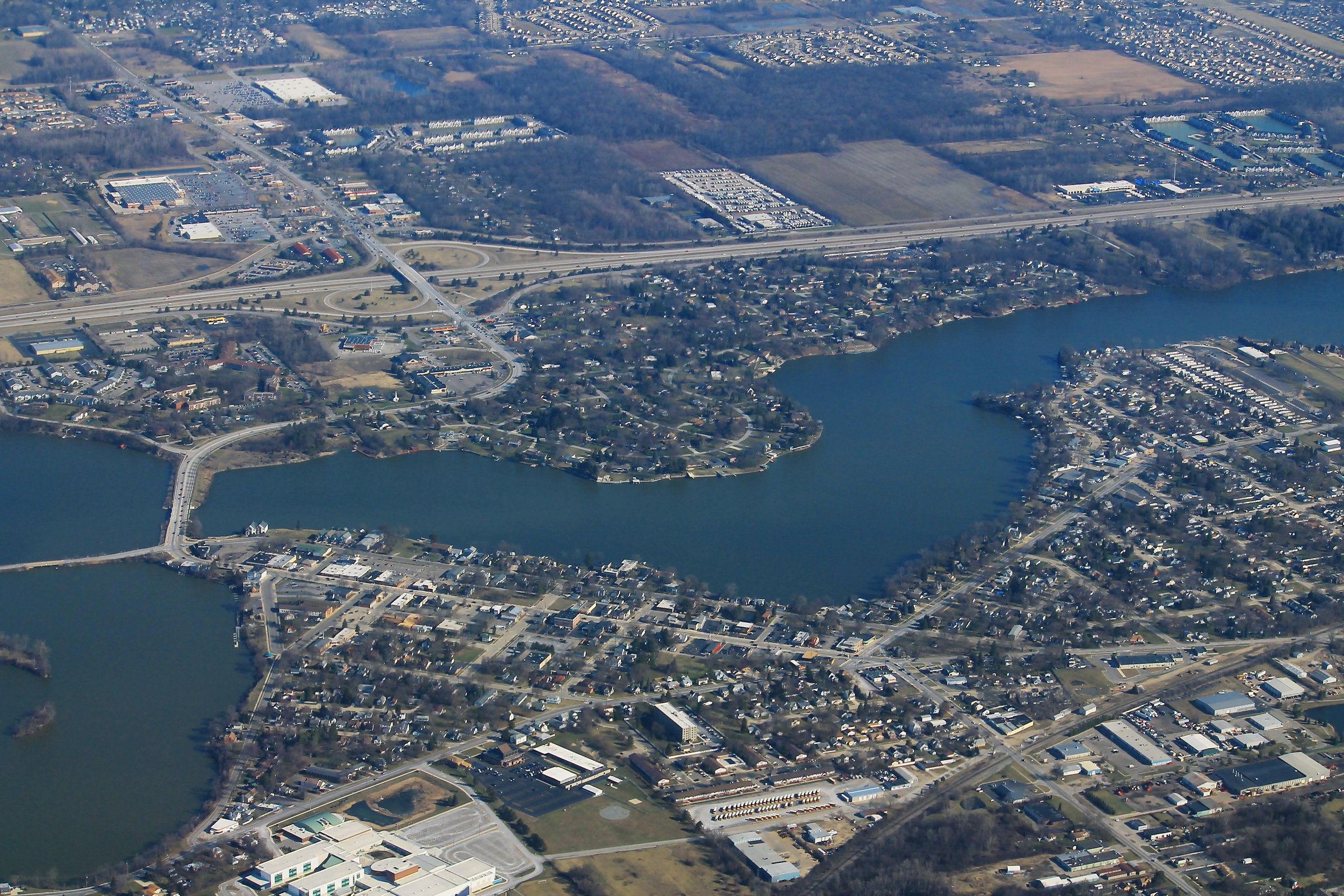
- Aerial view of Belleville

- Seal
- Motto: "Quality Living"
- Location within Wayne County

- Location within the State of Michigan Location within the United States
- Coordinates: 42°12′17″N 83°29′07″W
- Country: United States
- State: Michigan
- County: Wayne
- Platted: 1847
- Incorporated: 1905 (village); 1946 (city)

Government
  - Type: Council–manager
  - Mayor: Ken Voigt
  - Clerk: Briana Hootman
  - Manager: Steve Jones

Area
  - City: 1.19 sq mi (3.07 km^{2})
  - Land: 1.13 sq mi (2.93 km^{2})
  - Water: 0.054 sq mi (0.14 km^{2})
- Elevation: 673 ft (205 m)

Population (2020)
  - City: 4,008
  - Density: 3,539.8/sq mi (1,366.73/km^{2})
  - Metro: 4,285,832 (Metro Detroit)
- Time zone: UTC-5 (EST)
  - Summer (DST): UTC-4 (EDT)
- ZIP code(s): 48111, 48112
- Area code: 734
- FIPS code: 26-07020
- GNIS feature ID: 0621058
- Website: bellevilleonthelake.com

Belleville is a city in Wayne County in the U.S. state of Michigan. A western suburb of Detroit, Belleville is located roughly 29 miles (46.7 km) southwest of downtown Detroit, and 18 miles (29.0 km) southeast of Ann Arbor, and is entirely surrounded by Van Buren Township. As of the 2020 census, the city had a population of 4,008.

Belleville Lake is the city's principal geographic feature, and the city was also home to the National Strawberry Festival until the COVID pandemic.

== History ==
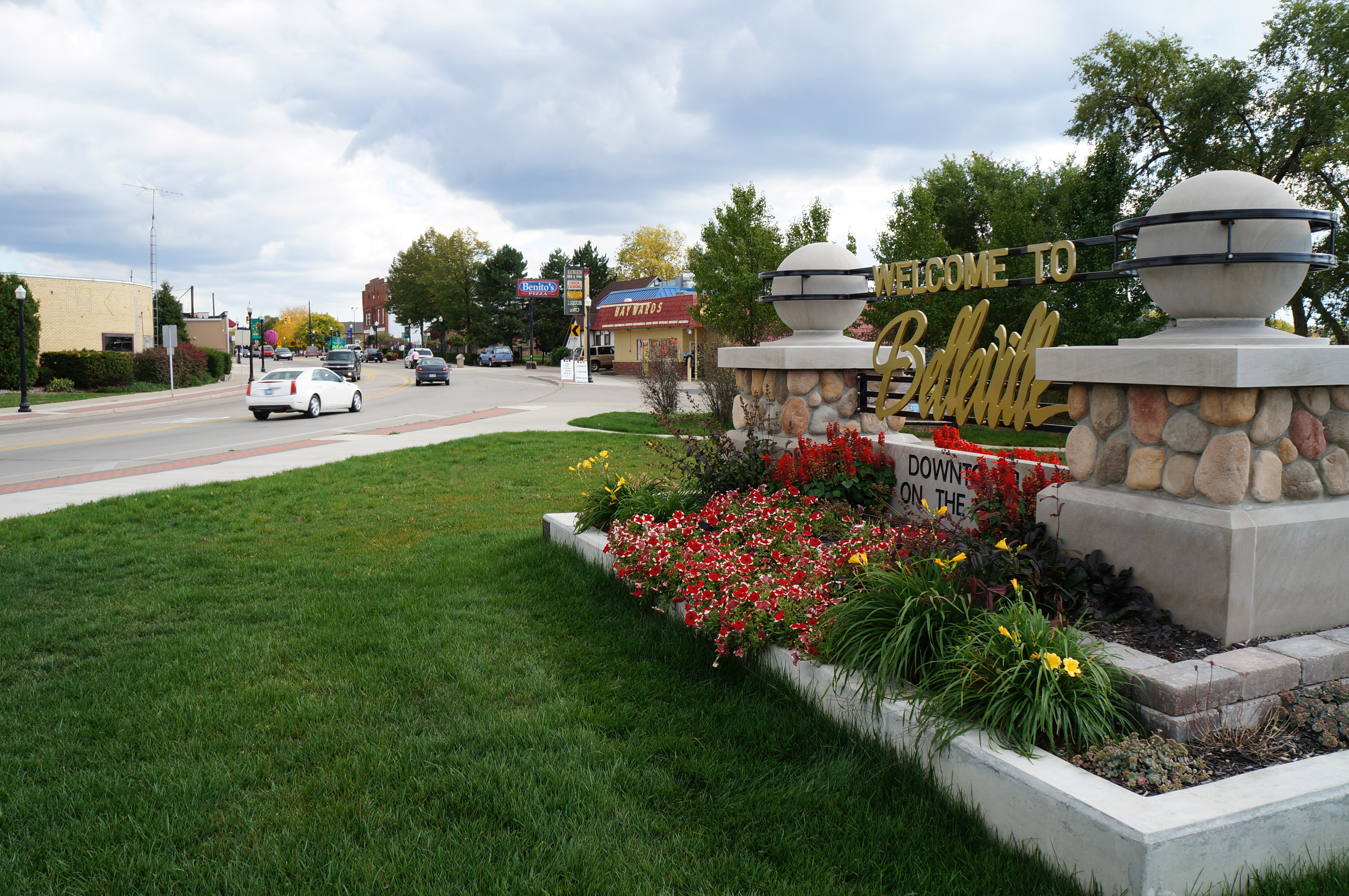
Welcome to Belleville sign, September 2012

The community was named in honor of landowner James Bell by adroitly choosing the French word for "beautiful town". The hamlet was platted in 1847 with the main thoroughfares still used today designated Main, Liberty, and High Street. About 1881, the Belleville depot on the Detroit line of the Wabash Railroad began serving travelers from across the region and the country.

Belleville was established as a village in 1905, when its governance separated from Van Buren Township by an act of the State Legislature. Located on the Huron River which was a natural trade route, the village had long been a thriving center for lumber businesses with saw mills located along the shores of the river. The large expanses of woodlands were removed to make way for farmland, industry and increasing population.

To generate more electrical power in the region, in early 1926 the Detroit Edison Company built the French Landing Dam on the river east of Belleville, thereby creating Belleville Lake. Belleville Lake is the largest inland lake in Wayne County, stretching 6 miles and covering 1,200 acres. The traditional downtown is nestled on the southern shore of Belleville Lake. Belleville achieved city status on 14 May 1946.

== Geography ==
According to the United States Census Bureau, the city has a total area of 1.20 square miles (3.11 km^{2}), of which 1.14 square miles (2.95 km^{2}) is land and 0.06 square miles (0.16 km^{2}) (5.00%) is water.

Belleville Lake was created by damming the Huron River when the French Landing Dam and Powerhouse was built in 1925 in neighboring Van Buren Township.

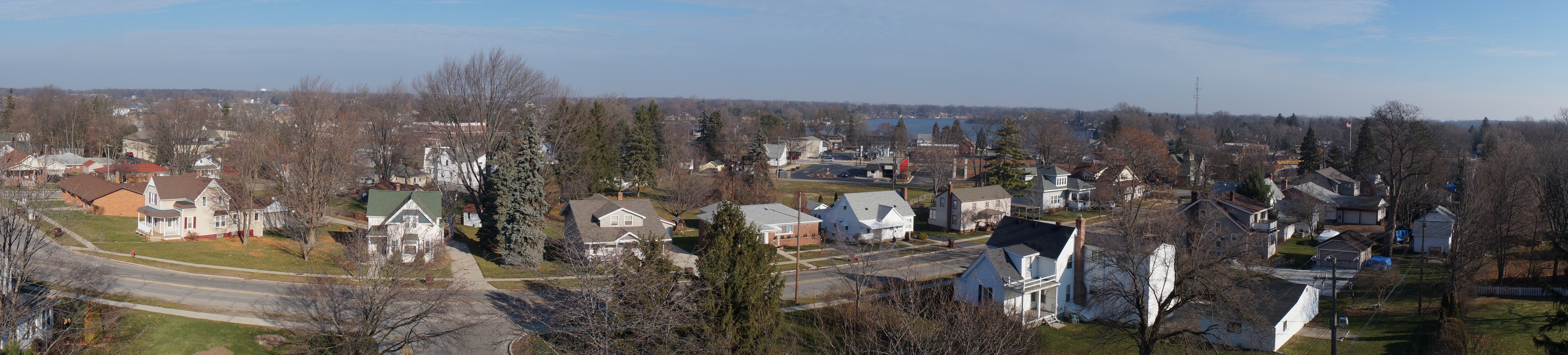
Belleville skyline from Columbia Court, November 2012

== Demographics ==
Historical population
Census	Pop.	Note	%±
1880	314		—
1890	367		16.9%
1910	486		—
1920	626		28.8%
1930	758		21.1%
1940	1,286		69.7%
1950	1,722		33.9%
1960	1,921		11.6%
1970	2,406		25.2%
1980	3,366		39.9%
1990	3,270		−2.9%
2000	3,997		22.2%
2010	3,991		−0.2%
2020	4,008		0.4%
U.S. Decennial Census; 2012 Estimate

=== Racial and ethnic composition ===
Belleville city, Michigan – Racial and ethnic composition Note: the US Census treats Hispanic/Latino as an ethnic category. This table excludes Latinos from the racial categories and assigns them to a separate category. Hispanics/Latinos may be of any race.
Race / Ethnicity (NH = Non-Hispanic)	Pop 2000	Pop 2010	Pop 2020	% 2000	% 2010	% 2020
White alone (NH)	3,448	3,132	2,822	86.26%	78.48%	70.41%
Black or African American alone (NH)	314	551	737	7.86%	13.81%	18.39%
Native American or Alaska Native alone (NH)	13	14	12	0.33%	0.35%	0.30%
Asian alone (NH)	45	31	36	1.13%	0.78%	0.90%
Native Hawaiian or Pacific Islander alone (NH)	0	0	0	0.00%	0.00%	0.00%
Other race alone (NH)	9	6	5	0.23%	0.15%	0.12%
Mixed race or Multiracial (NH)	67	104	231	1.68%	2.61%	5.76%
Hispanic or Latino (any race)	101	153	165	2.53%	3.83%	4.12%
Total	3,997	3,991	4,008	100.00%	100.00%	100.00%

=== 2020 census ===
As of the 2020 census, Belleville had a population of 4,008. The median age was 43.4 years. 19.6% of residents were under the age of 18 and 20.3% were 65 years of age or older. For every 100 females, there were 89.1 males, and for every 100 females age 18 and over, there were 85.3 males.

100.0% of residents lived in urban areas, while 0.0% lived in rural areas.

There were 1,876 households, of which 26.3% had children under the age of 18 living in them. Of all households, 34.0% were married-couple households, 22.5% were households with a male householder and no spouse or partner present, and 36.4% were households with a female householder and no spouse or partner present. About 40.3% of all households were made up of individuals, and 19.3% had someone living alone who was 65 years of age or older.

There were 1,972 housing units, of which 4.9% were vacant. The homeowner vacancy rate was 1.4% and the rental vacancy rate was 4.4%.

=== 2010 census ===
As of the census of 2010, there were 3,991 people, 1,755 households, and 1,005 families living in the city. The population density was 3,500.9 inhabitants per square mile (1,351.7/km^{2}). There were 1,965 housing units at an average density of 1,723.7 per square mile (665.5/km^{2}). The racial makeup of the city was 80.6% White, 14.1% African American, 0.4% Native American, 0.8% Asian, 1.0% from other races, and 3.2% from two or more races. Hispanic or Latino of any race were 3.8% of the population.

There were 1,755 households, of which 28.2% had children under the age of 18 living with them, 37.8% were married couples living together, 14.2% had a female householder with no husband present, 5.2% had a male householder with no wife present, and 42.7% were non-families. 36.2% of all households were made up of individuals, and 15.9% had someone living alone who was 65 years of age or older. The average household size was 2.26 and the average family size was 2.95.

The median age in the city was 40 years. 21.9% of residents were under the age of 18; 8.9% were between the ages of 18 and 24; 26.4% were from 25 to 44; 28.2% were from 45 to 64; and 14.6% were 65 years of age or older. The gender makeup of the city was 46.7% male and 53.3% female.

=== 2000 census ===
As of the census of 2000, there were 3,997 people, 1,842 households, and 1,022 families living in the city. The population density was 3,520.3 inhabitants per square mile (1,359.2/km^{2}). There were 1,931 housing units at an average density of 1,700.7 per square mile (656.6/km^{2}). The racial makeup of the city was 87.54% White, 7.88% African American, 0.40% Native American, 1.18% Asian, 0.95% from other races, and 2.05% from two or more races. Hispanic or Latino of any race were 2.53% of the population.

There were 1,842 households, out of which 26.0% had children under the age of 18 living with them, 42.8% were married couples living together, 9.0% had a female householder with no husband present, and 44.5% were non-families. 37.1% of all households were made up of individuals, and 14.1% had someone living alone who was 65 years of age or older. The average household size was 2.16 and the average family size was 2.87.

In the city, the population was spread out, with 21.9% under the age of 18, 6.8% from 18 to 24, 32.8% from 25 to 44, 23.2% from 45 to 64, and 15.2% who were 65 years of age or older. The median age was 38 years. For every 100 females, there were 91.1 males. For every 100 females age 18 and over, there were 89.2 males.

The median income for a household in the city was $44,196, and the median income for a family was $56,071. Males had a median income of $47,759 versus $30,145 for females. The per capita income for the city was $25,927. About 3.5% of families and 6.0% of the population were below the poverty line, including 1.5% of those under age 18 and 13.3% of those age 65 and over.

== Arts and culture ==
=== Festivals ===
From 1977 through 2019, Belleville hosted an annual festival, called the National Strawberry Festival. The Strawberry Festival generated considerable media coverage. People from all over Wayne County came to celebrate Belleville's economic supporter, the strawberry.

=== Points of interest ===
In the 1930s, Belleville had a reputation as a resort community where the wealthy of Detroit maintained getaway estates. Henry Ford and Charles Lindbergh once owned summer cottages on Belleville Lake, in the neighborhood of Harmony Lane.

=== Music ===
Techno music was invented in the mid-to-late 1980s by Juan Atkins, Derrick May, and Kevin Saunderson (collectively known as The Belleville Three). Their music, along with that of Eddie Fowlkes, Blake Baxter, James Pennington and others is viewed as the first wave of techno from Detroit.

=== Education ===
Belleville is in the Van Buren Public Schools district. Belleville High School, Owen Intermediate, and Edgemont Elementary are located within the city limits of Belleville.

=== Sister city ===
The city is twinned with Machynlleth, Wales.

== Notable people ==
- John Rodney McRae (1934-2005), suspected serial killer
- Juan Atkins (born 1962), musician, member of The Belleville Three
- Derrick May (born 1963), musician, member of The Belleville Three
- Kevin Saunderson (born 1964), musician, member of The Belleville Three
- Bryce Underwood (born 2007), American football quarterback

== Gallery ==
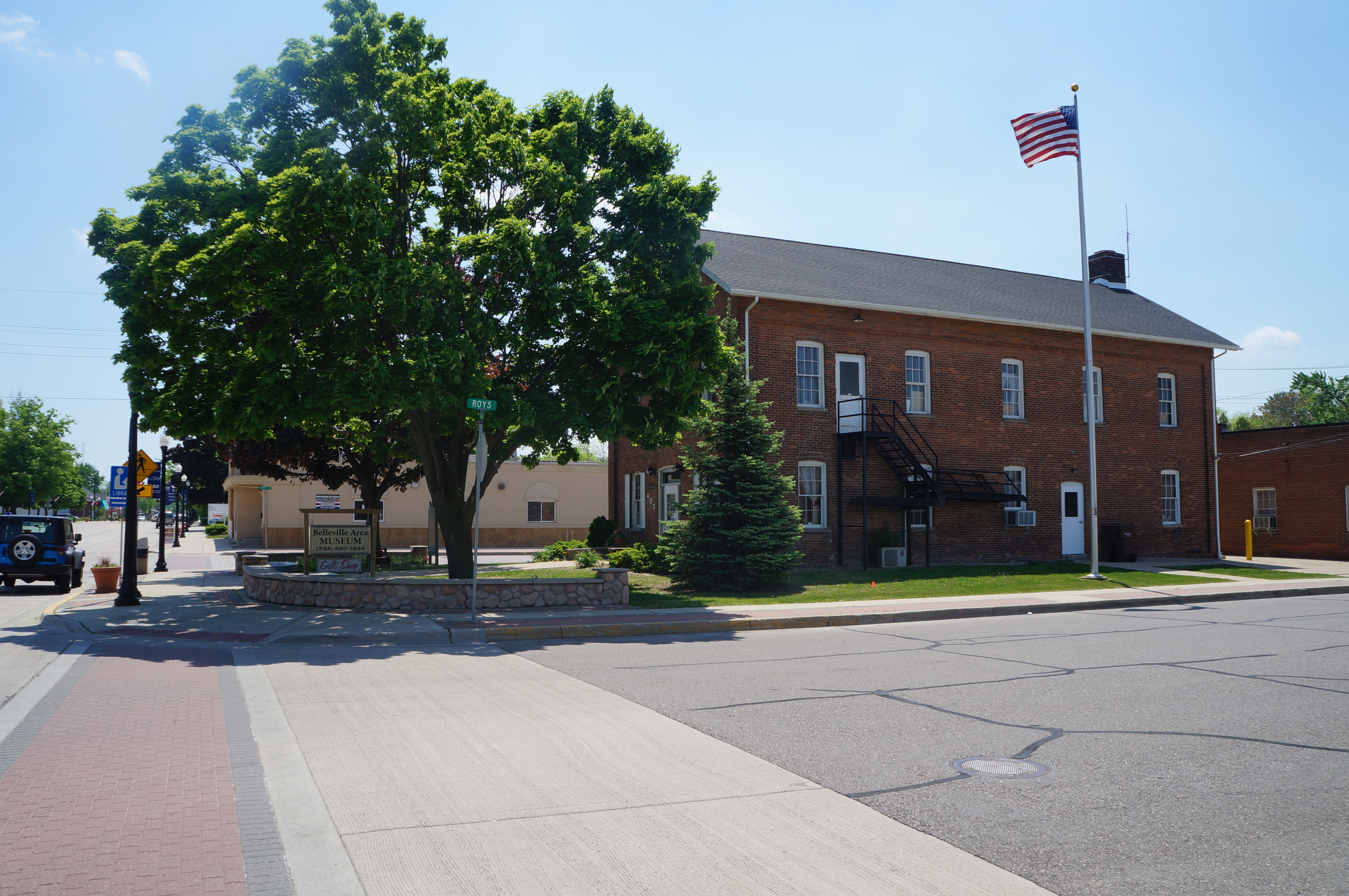
Former Van Buren Hall, now Belleville Area Museum

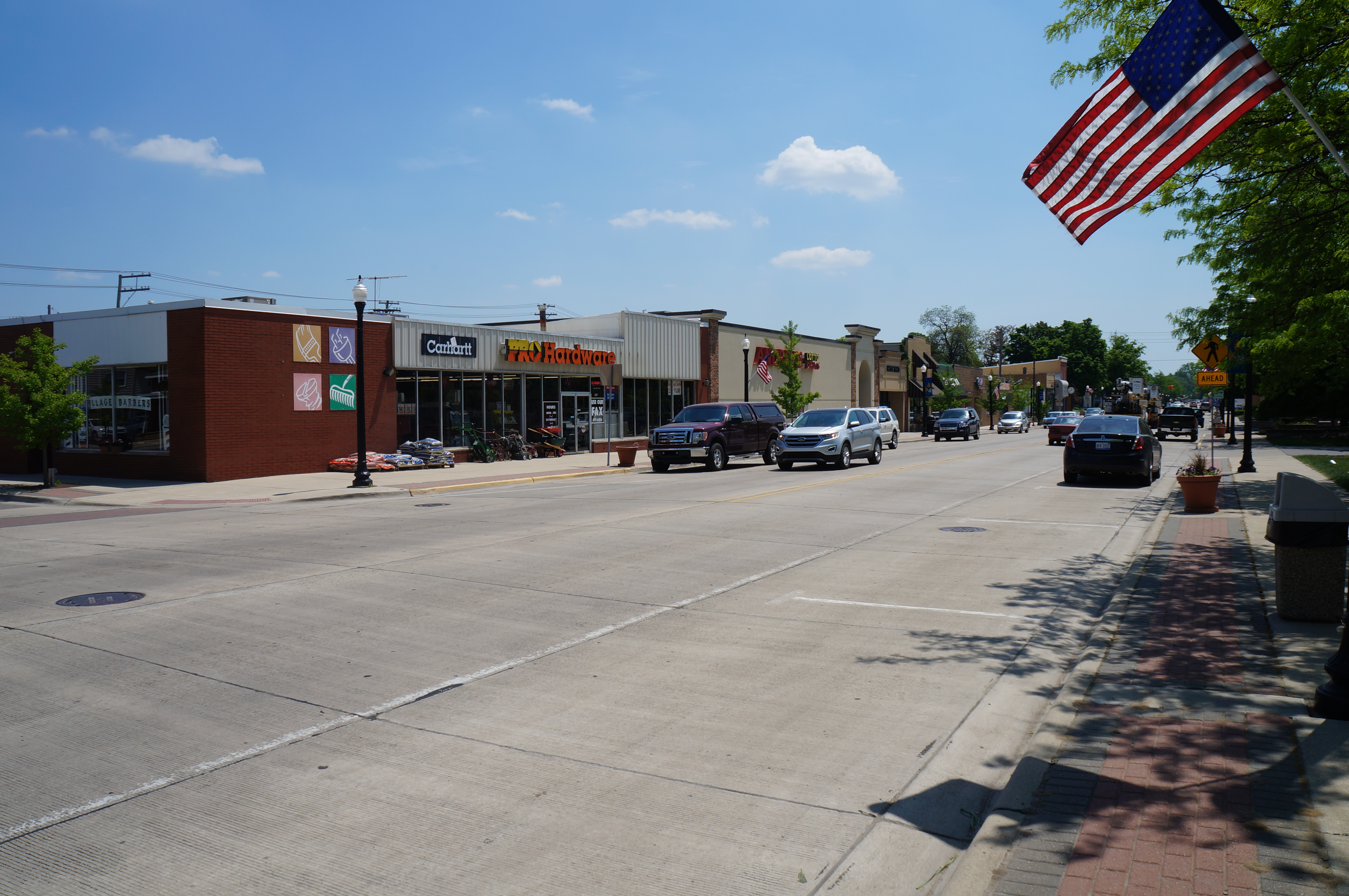
Downtown Belleville looking south along Main Street

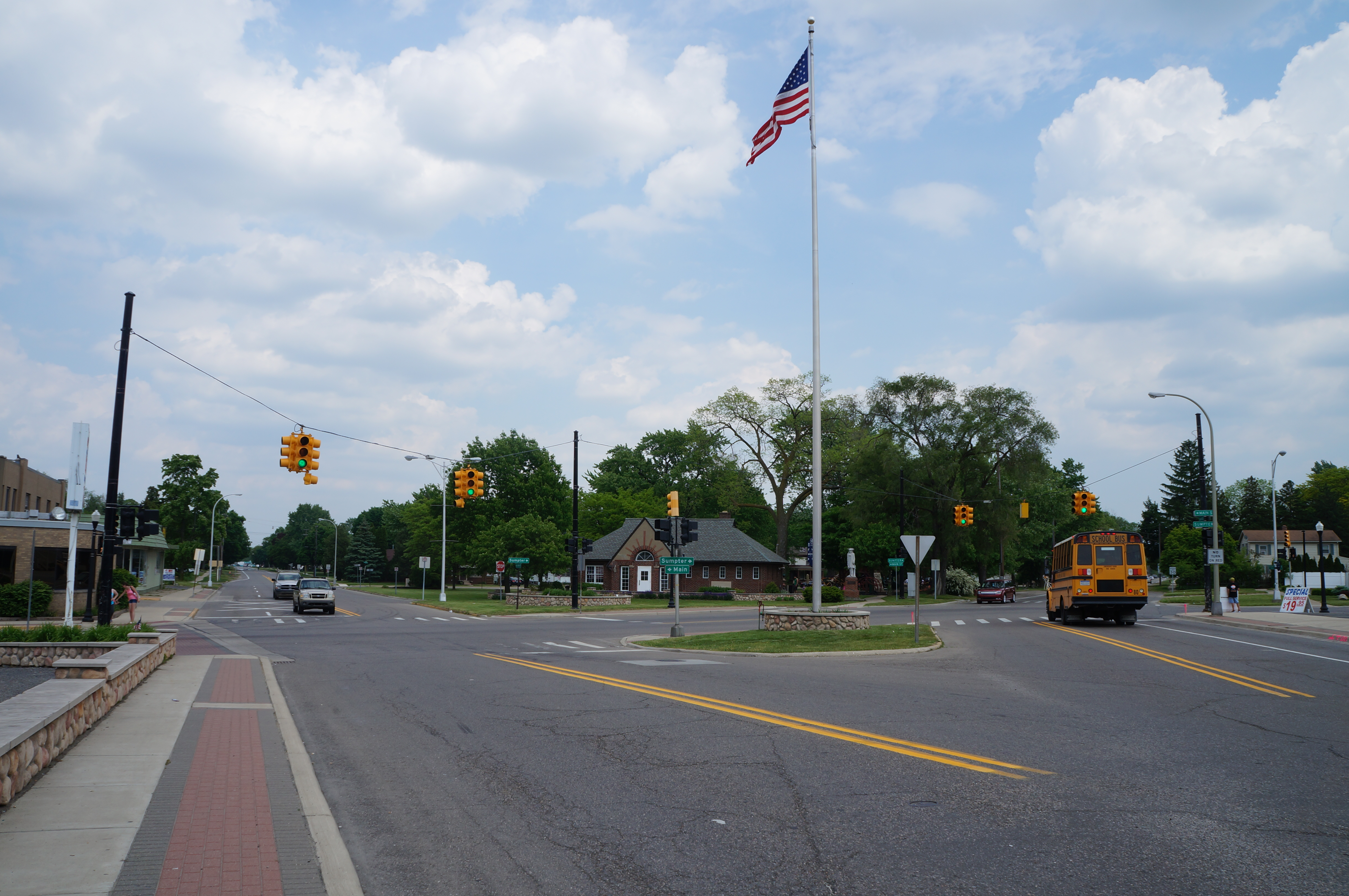
Five point intersection near Victory Park

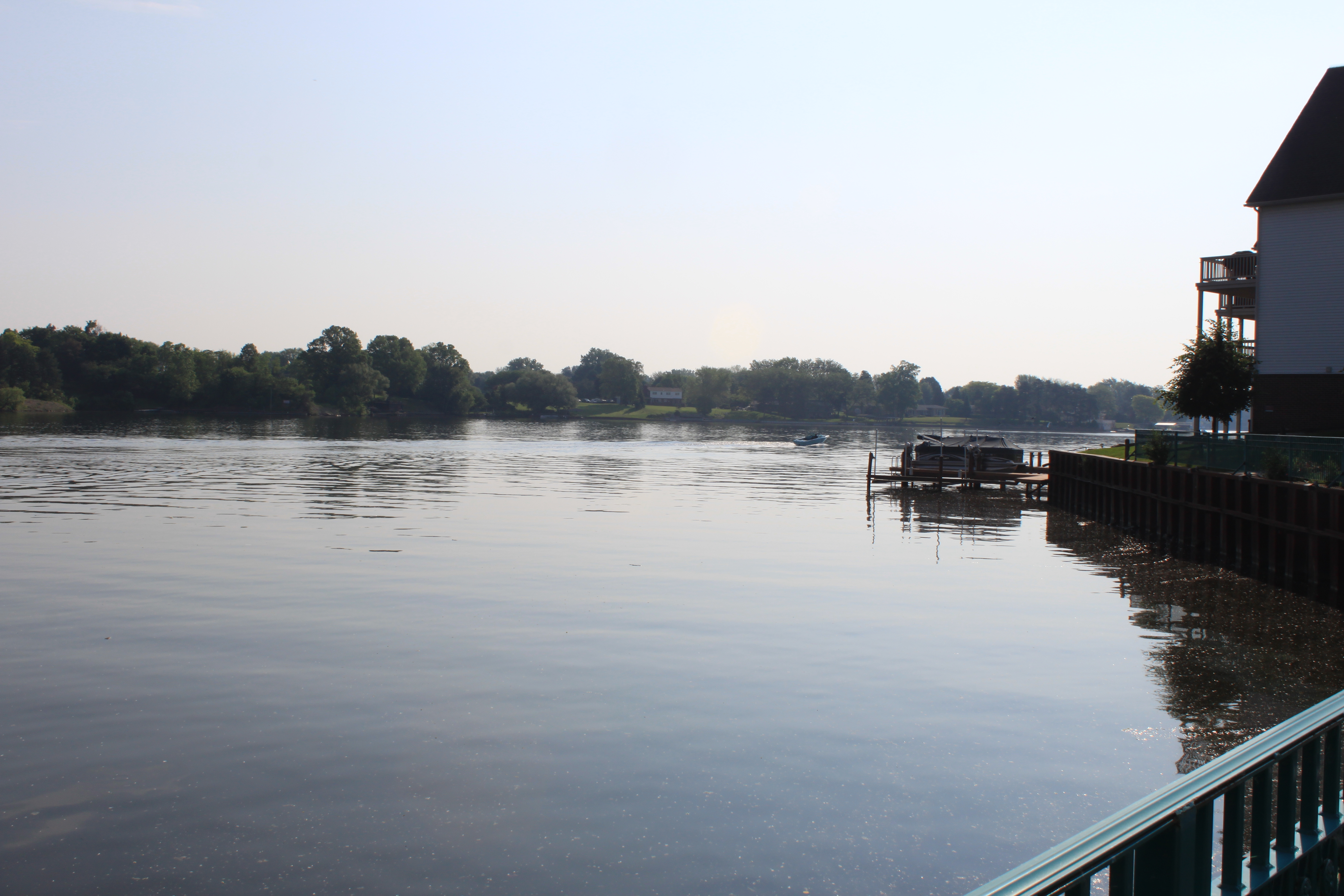
Belleville Lake as viewed from Doane's Landing subdivision

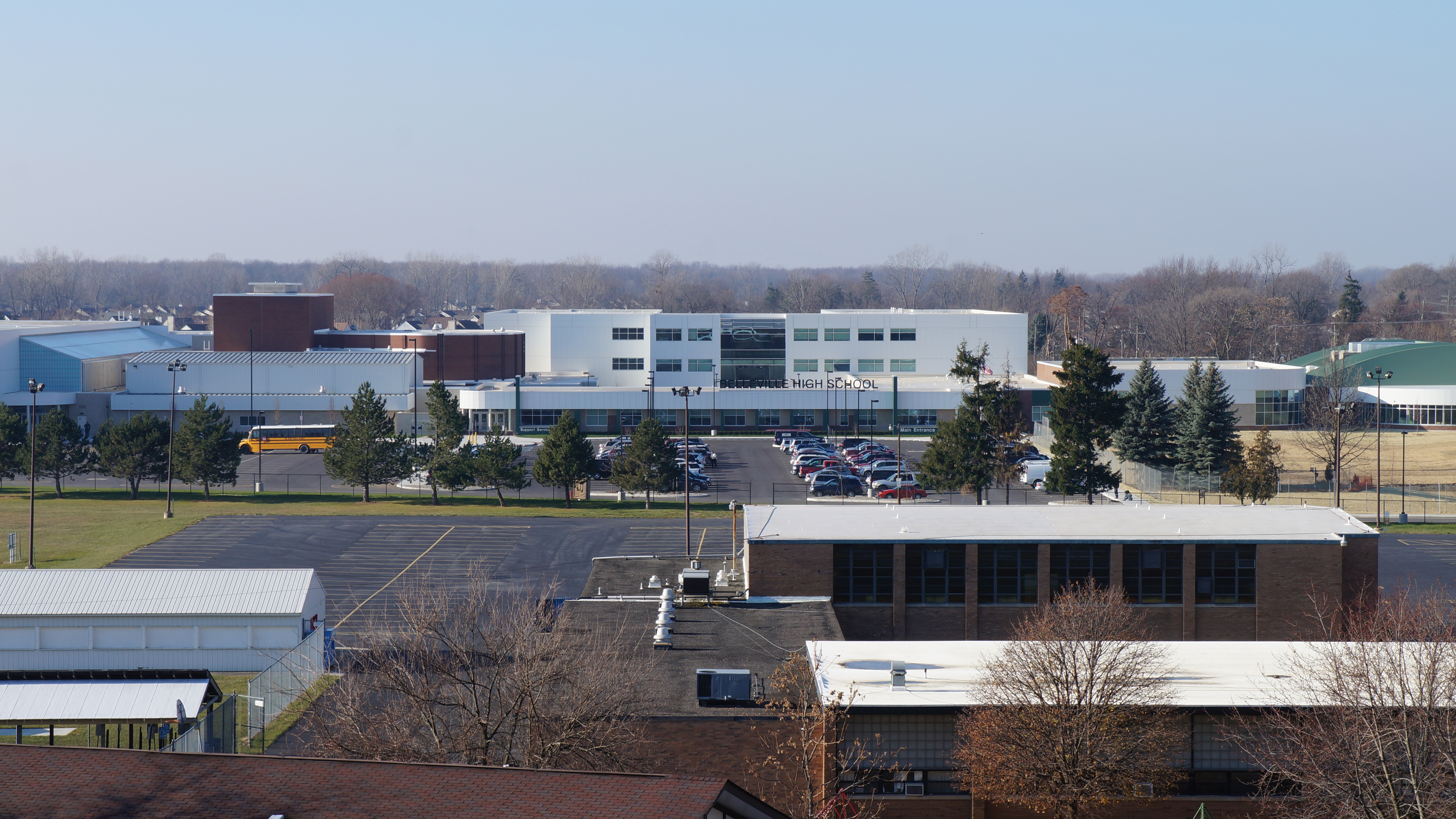
Belleville High School

== See also ==
- List of municipalities in Michigan
