= French Landing Dam and Powerhouse =

Hydroelectric dam in Michigan, U.S.

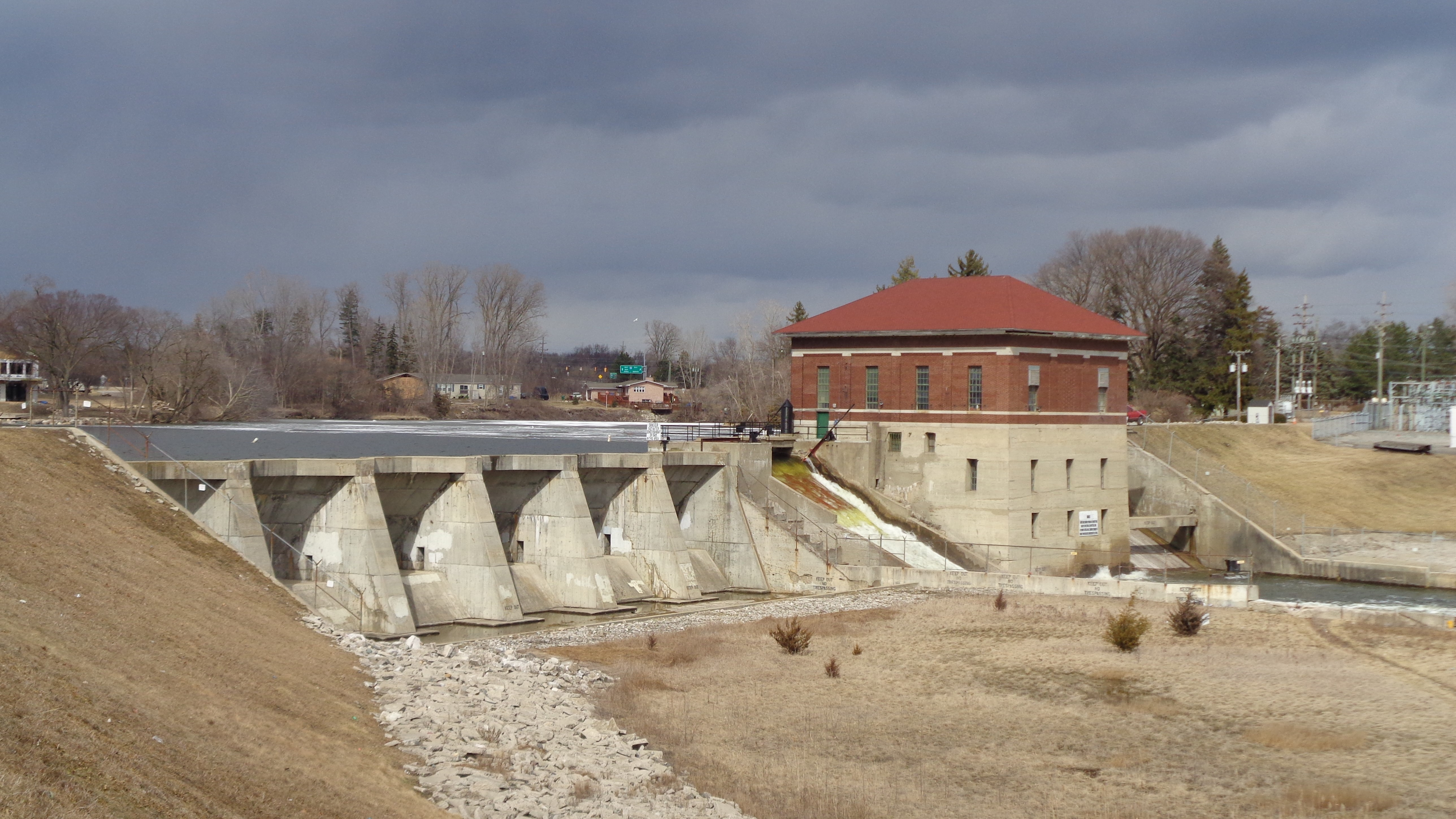
- French Landing Dam in March 2019

- Location within the state of Michigan
- Location: 12100 Haggerty Road; Van Buren Charter Township, Wayne County, Michigan
- Coordinates: 42°12′51″N 83°26′26″W
- Purpose: Power
- Status: Operational
- Opening date: 1925; 101 years ago
- Built by: Detroit Edison Company
- Owner: Van Buren Charter Township
- Operator: STS Hydropower

Dam and spillways
- Type of dam: Gravity dam
- Impounds: Huron River
- Length: 180 feet (55 m)
- Width (crest): 890 feet (270 m)

Reservoir
- Creates: Belleville Lake
- Total capacity: 1,270 acres (5.1 sq km)

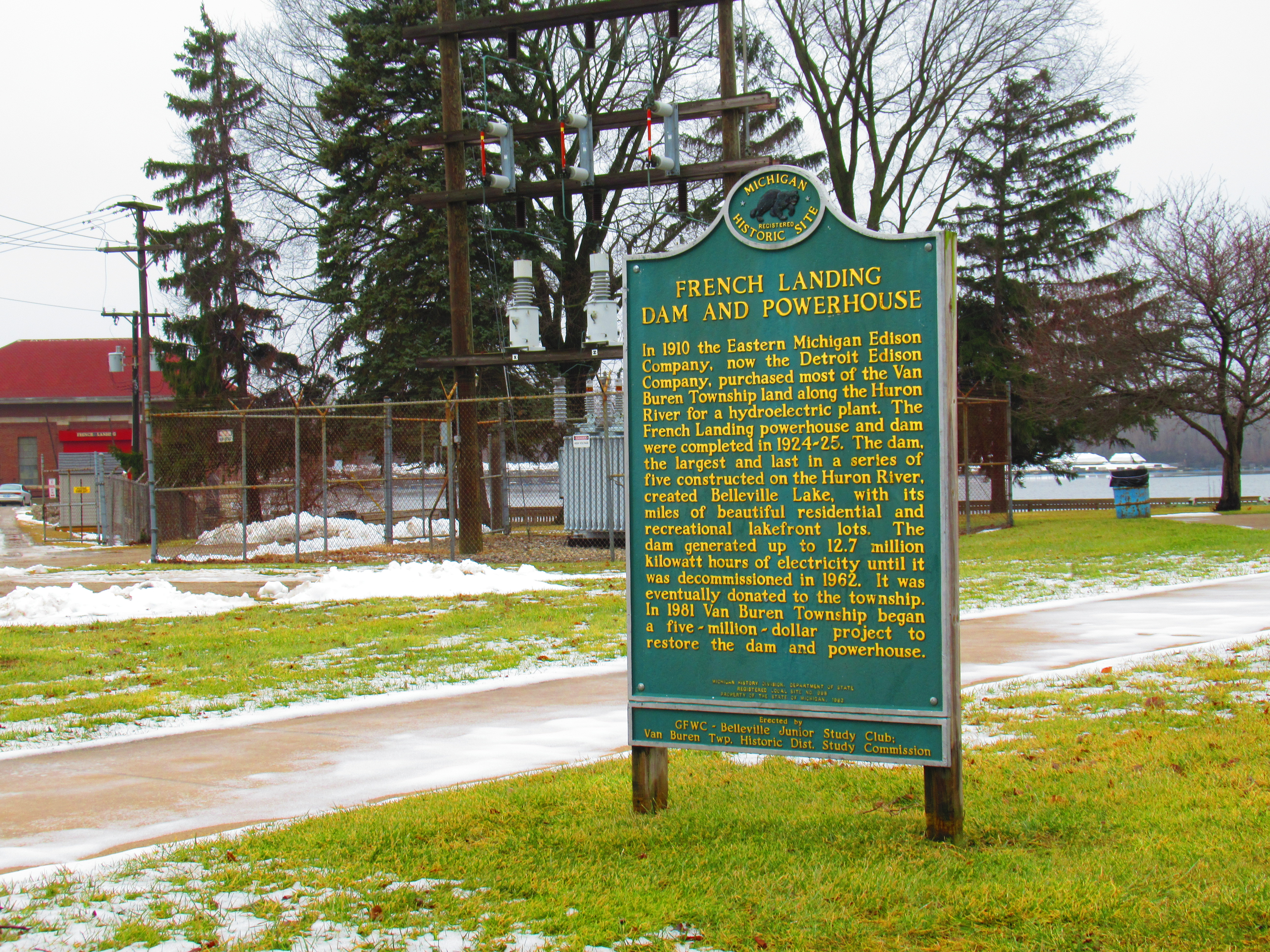
Michigan State Historic Site marker

The French Landing Dam and Powerhouse is a hydroelectric gravity dam and powerhouse crossing the Huron River in Van Buren Charter Township in Wayne County in the U.S. state of Michigan. The dam and the powerhouse were completed in 1925 by the Detroit Edison Company on land previously purchased in 1910. The dam and powerhouse were designated as a Michigan State Historic Site on February 18, 1982.

The French Landing Dam is about 28 miles (45 km) from the river mouth at Lake Erie. It is the second-to-last of the 17 dams along the 130-mile-long (210 km) Huron River, approximately 7.9 miles (12.7 km) downstream from the Ford Lake Dam and 18.4 miles upstream from the Flat Rock Dam. When the dam was completed, the resulting reservoir created Belleville Lake and subsequently led to the destruction of the village of Rawsonville.

When completed, the powerhouse had a hydroelectric generating capacity of 12.7 kilowatt hours. The powerhouse was decommissioned in 1962. In 1981, the property was donated to the township, restored, and put back into service in 1988 and is still operational. The powerhouse currently has a capacity of 1.7 MW. The powerhouse facility and the dam are off limits to the public, but the surrounding area along Haggerty Road has been organized as the French Landing Park, which is a popular destination for picnickers and shore fishermen.
