= Dearborn Heights School District 7 =

School district in Michigan

Dearborn Heights School District #7

Address
- 20629 Annapolis Street Dearborn Heights, Wayne County, Michigan, 48125; United States
- Coordinates: 42.2766°N 83.2391°W

District information
- Type: Public
- Grades: PreKindergarten-12
- Superintendent: Mark Kleinhans
- Schools: 6
- Budget: $42,905,000 (2022-2023 expeditures)
- NCES District ID: 2626130

Students and staff
- Students: 2,387 (2024-2025)
- Teachers: 205.31 FTE (2024-2025)
- Staff: 369.89 FTE (2024-2025)
- Student–teacher ratio: 11.63 (2024-2025)
- District mascot: Cougars

Other information
- Website: www.district7.net

Dearborn Heights School District #7 is one of the three public school districts in Dearborn Heights, Michigan, in Metro Detroit. The Crestwood School District is located in the city's northern side, while the Westwood School District is located in the city's southwest side.

== History ==
After being left out in the unification process of Dearborn Public Schools in 1944, District 7 was on its own. At the time, District 7 had a total of 1,414 students living within the designated areas of Dearborn Heights. The school district had no schools in which to educate these students. All students attended schools in Dearborn Public Schools until around 1948, when two schools were built for kindergarten and first grade, including Pardee Elementary.

Several schools were built during the 1950s, including the Annapolis High School building, which originally housed Best Junior High. In November 1966, the school board changed the district's name from Dearborn District No. 7 to Dearborn Heights District 7.

When a new Best Junior High School opened in 1967, Annapolis High School was established in the former junior high building, making Dearborn Heights School District #7 entirely independent from Dearborn Public Schools.

== Schools ==
Schools in Dearborn Heights School District #7
School	Address	Notes
Annapolis High School	4650 Clippert, Dearborn Heights	Grades 9-12
Oakley W. Best Middle School	22201 Powers Avenue, Dearborn Heights	Grades 6-8
Bedford Elementary	4650 Croissant Street, Dearborn Heights	Grades K-5
Pardee Elementary	4650 Pardee Avenue, Dearborn Heights	Grades K-5
Polk Elementary	4651 Polk Street, Dearborn Heights	Grades K-5
Madison Early Learning Center	4950 Madison Street, Dearborn Heights	Grades K-5
Dearborn Heights Virtual Academy	20629 Annapolis Street, Dearborn Heights	Grades K-5
