= Van Buren Public Schools =

School district in Michigan

Address
- 555 W. Columbia Ave. Belleville, Wayne, Michigan, 48111; United States

District information
- Type: Public
- Grades: Pre-kindergarten through 12
- Superintendent: Peter Kudlak
- Schools: 8
- Budget: $84,326,000 (2022-2023 expeditures)
- NCES District ID: 2634560

Students and staff
- Students: 4,273 (2024-2025)
- Teachers: 245.7 FTE (2024-2025)
- Staff: 572.93 FTE (2024-2025)
- Student–teacher ratio: 17.39 (2024-2025)

Other information
- Website: www.vanburenschools.net

The Van Buren Public Schools (VBPS) is a school district headquartered in Belleville, Michigan. It also serves portions of Canton Township, Sumpter Township, Van Buren Township, and Ypsilanti Township.

== History ==
Belleville High School was reconstructed in 2012 and 2013. The architect was Fanning Howey.

== Schools ==
Schools in Van Buren Public Schools
School	Address	Notes
Belleville High School	501 W. Columbia Ave., Belleville	Grades 9-12
McBride Middle School	47097 McBride, Belleville	Grades 7-8. Formerly North Middle School
Owen Intermediate School	45201 Owen St., Belleville	Grades 5-6. Formerly South Middle School
Edgemont Elementary School	125 S. Edgemont St., Belleville	Grades K-4
Rawsonville Elementary School	3110 Grove Rd., Ypsilanti Twp.	Grades K-4
Savage Elementary School	42975 Savage Rd., Belleville	Grades PreK-4
Tyler Elementary School	42200 Tyler Rd., Belleville	Grades K-4
Early Childhood Center	451 West Columbia Ave., Belleville	Preschool

=== Defunct schools ===
- Elwell Elementary School (Sumpter Township) - This school has been razed.
- Denton Elementary School (Van Buren Township) - This school has been razed.
- Quirk Road Elementary School (Van Buren Township) - This school has been razed.
- Early Childhood Development Center (Belleville - Outbuilding of Edgemont Elementary site) - This building has been razed.
- West Willow Elementary School (Ypsilanti Township, Michigan) Belleville Elementary School (Van Buren Township) - Razed or outbuilded etc
