= Crestwood School District =

Crestwood School District can refer to:

- Crestwood School District (Michigan)
- Crestwood School District (Pennsylvania)
