= Sumpter Township, Michigan =

- Civil township
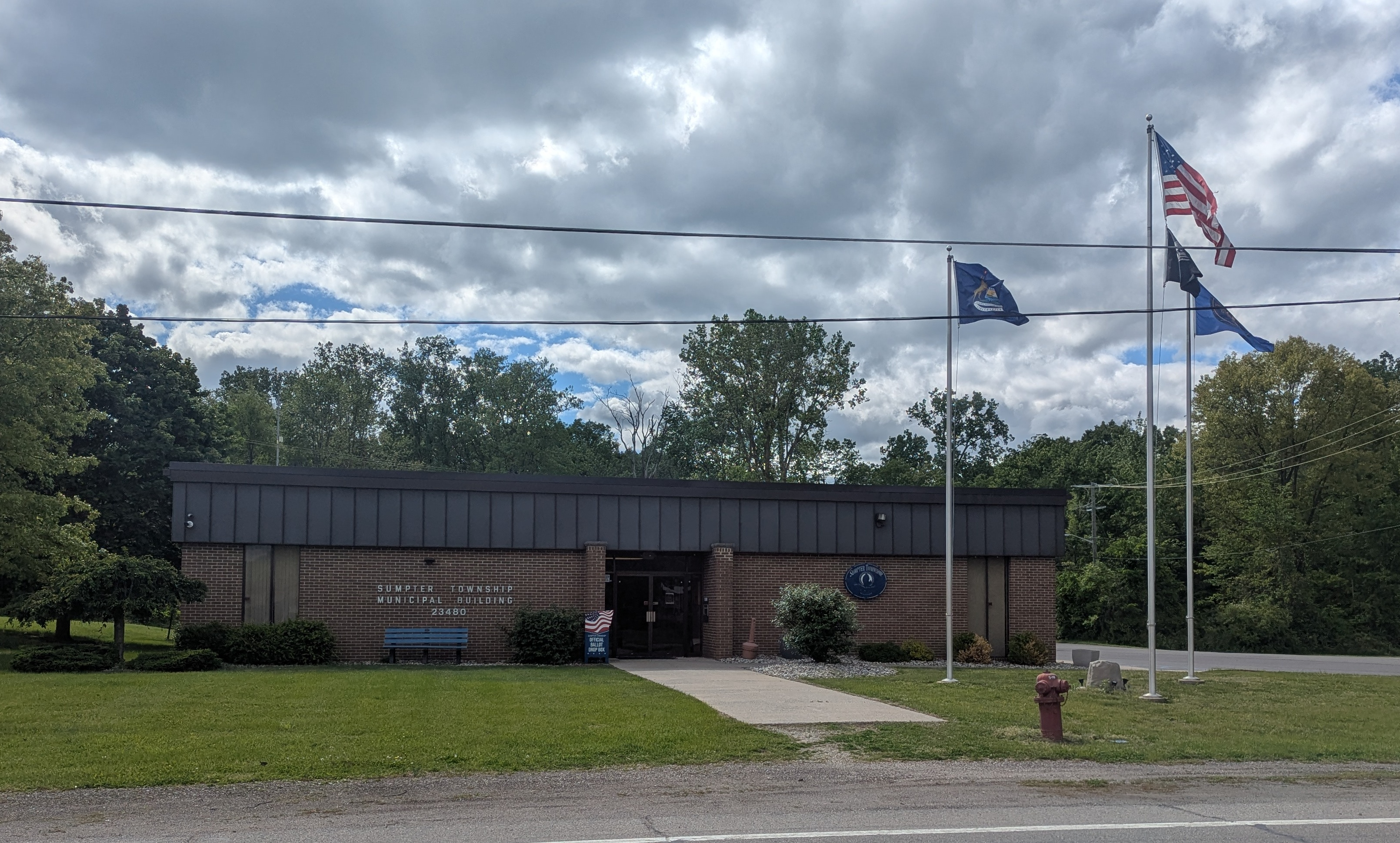
- Township Municipal Building on Sumpter Road

- Location within Wayne County

- Location within the state of Michigan Location within the United States
- Coordinates: 42°08′19″N 83°29′42″W
- Country: United States
- State: Michigan
- County: Wayne
- Established: 1840

Government
  - Supervisor: Timothy Bowman
  - Clerk: Esther Hurst

Area
  - Total: 37.44 sq mi (96.97 km^{2})
  - Land: 37.36 sq mi (96.76 km^{2})
  - Water: 0.081 sq mi (0.21 km^{2})
- Elevation: 663 ft (202 m)

Population (2020)
  - Total: 9,660
  - Density: 258.6/sq mi (99.8/km^{2})
- Time zone: UTC-5 (EST)
  - Summer (DST): UTC-4 (EDT)
- ZIP code(s): 48111 (Belleville); 48164 (New Boston)
- Area code: 734
- FIPS code: 26-77360
- GNIS feature ID: 1627138
- Website: Official website

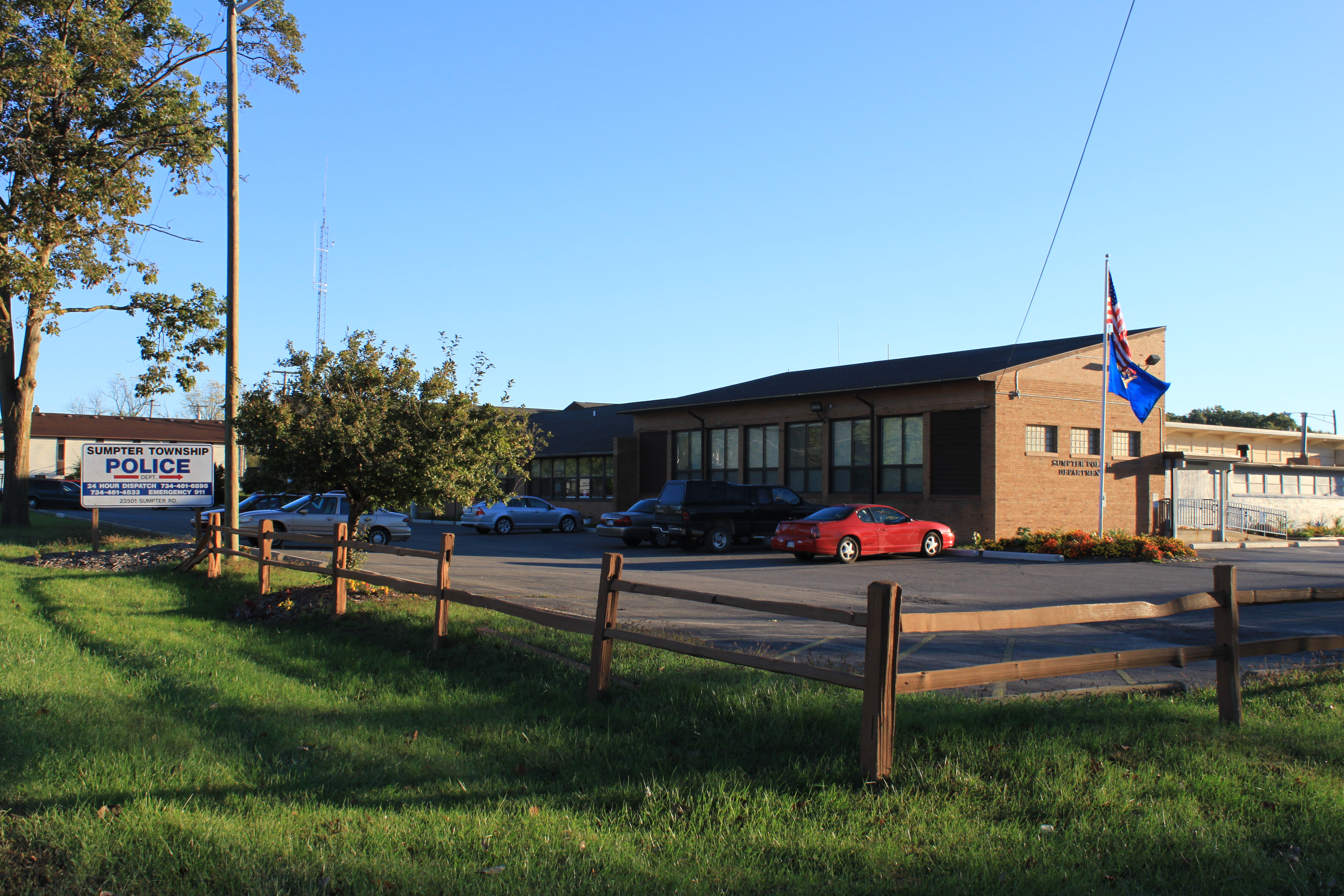
Sumpter Police Department

Sumpter Township is a civil township of Wayne County in the U.S. state of Michigan. The population was 9,660 at the 2020 census.

== Communities ==
- Ellisville was a community in the 1870s.
- Martinsville is an unincorporated community located within the township at 42°08′41″N 83°27′38″W. The community was settled as early as 1840 and was briefly part of Van Buren Township until Sumpter Township was organized that same year. A post office operated here from April 7, 1866, until September 16, 1906. The Martinsville Cemetery remains in the area as an active cemetery.
- Smithsville is a former community in the eastern portion of the township. It was given a post office named Woodville on April 12, 1852, and renamed Smithville on January 18, 1858. The post office was renamed again and transferred to Waltz on February 19, 1872.
- West Sumpter is an unincorporated community centered along the intersection of Karr Road and Wear Road at 42°07′21″N 83°30′34″W. The community was one of the first settlements in the township and was named after Revolutionary War veteran and later politician Thomas Sumter, although inaccurately spelled as Sumpter Township. A post office named West Sumpter operated from March 24, 1874, until February 28, 1902.

== History ==
Sumpter Township was designated Township 4 South in Range 8 East of Wayne County. The original survey was approved on November 5, 1819. Federal land in Sumpter Township began to be sold to individuals by the 1830s, with one land patent to Arthur Fuller on April 4, 1833. Sumpter Township has a brief history on their web page.

Sumpter Township, including Township 4 South, of Range 8 East, was taken from Huron township and erected into a separate township on April 6, 1840, under the name of West Huron. Subsequently the name was changed to that of Sumter in honor of General Thomas Sumter, Revolutionary war hero, but the engrossing clerk inserted a "p" in the name, which has since remained Sumpter.

The township received its first settlers before it was set off from Huron Township. George Jewett, one of the first assessors of Huron township lived in what is now Sumpter, and Ira P. Beach was elected the first supervisor when Sumpter township was erected.

== Geography ==
According to the U.S. Census Bureau, the township has a total area of 37.44 square miles (96.97 km^{2}), of which 37.36 square miles (96.76 km^{2}) is land and 0.08 square miles (0.21 km^{2}) (0.21%) is water.

== Demographics ==
As of the 2010 census Sumpter Township had a population of 9,549. The ethnic and racial makeup of the population was 82.1% non-Hispanic white, 12.0% African American, 0.6% Native American, 0.3% Asian, 0.1% from some other race, 2.9% reporting two or more races and 2.6% Hispanic or Latino.

As of the census of 2000, there were 11,856 people, 4,110 households, and 3,164 families residing in the township. The population density was 315.6 inhabitants per square mile (121.9/km^{2}). There were 4,563 housing units at an average density of 121.5 per square mile (46.9/km^{2}). The racial makeup of the township was 84.68% White, 12.33% African American, 0.52% Native American, 0.18% Asian, 0.50% from other races, and 1.79% from two or more races. Hispanic or Latino of any race were 1.78% of the population.

There were 4,110 households, out of which 39.4% had children under the age of 18 living with them, 56.1% were married couples living together, 13.9% had a female householder with no husband present, and 23.0% were non-families. 17.6% of all households were made up of individuals, and 4.5% had someone living alone who was 65 years of age or older. The average household size was 2.88 and the average family size was 3.22.

In the township the population was spread out, with 29.8% under the age of 18, 9.0% from 18 to 24, 31.8% from 25 to 44, 22.0% from 45 to 64, and 7.4% who were 65 years of age or older. The median age was 33 years. For every 100 females, there were 100.8 males. For every 100 females age 18 and over, there were 100.7 males.

The median income for a household in the township was $48,680, and the median income for a family was $51,731. Males had a median income of $41,123 versus $27,397 for females. The per capita income for the township was $19,323. About 8.0% of families and 10.0% of the population were below the poverty line, including 12.6% of those under age 18 and 12.4% of those age 65 or over.

== Education ==
Sumpter Township is divided between four neighboring school districts. The entire western edge of the township is served by Lincoln Consolidated School District in neighboring Washtenaw County. The north-central portion of the township is served by Van Buren Public Schools to the north. The southwestern portion of the township is served by Airport Community Schools to the south in Monroe County, and a small eastern portion of the township is served by Huron School District.

The township itself no longer contains any public school buildings after Lincoln Consolidated closed Bessie Hoffman Elementary at the end of the 2009–10 school year. The school was built in 1965 and is located at 50700 Willow Road. Following its closure, it remains vacant.
