= Annapolis High School =

Annapolis High School may refer to:

== In the United States ==
- Annapolis High School (Maryland) in Annapolis, Maryland
- Annapolis High School (Michigan) in Dearborn Heights, Michigan
