= Dearborn Heights, Michigan =

- City
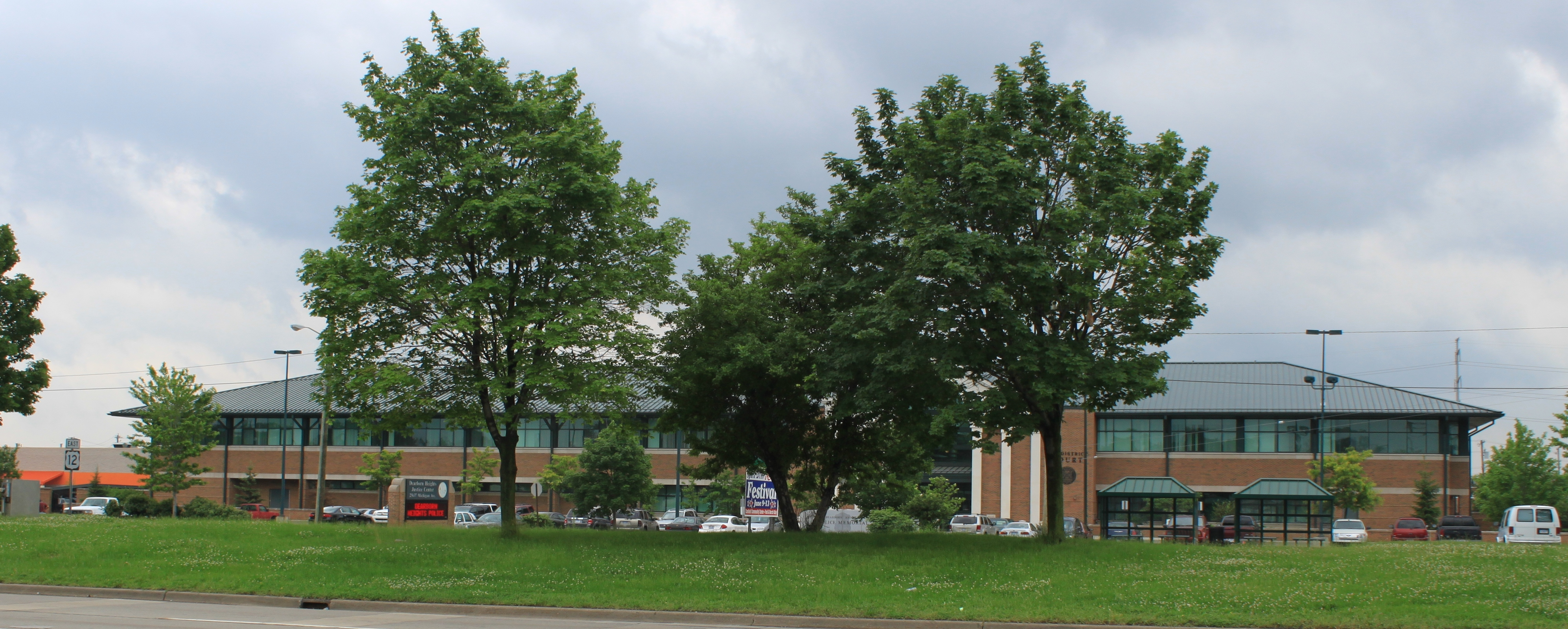
- Dearborn Heights Justice Center

- Seal
- Motto: Dei Gratia (By the grace of God)
- Interactive map of Dearborn Heights, Michigan
- Location within Michigan Location within the United States
- Coordinates: 42°19′47″N 83°16′48″W
- Country: United States
- State: Michigan
- County: Wayne
- Incorporated: 1960

Government
  - Type: Mayor–council
  - Mayor: Mo Baydoun
  - Clerk: Lynne Senia
  - City council: Council members: Hassan Ahmad; Hassan Saab; Nancy Bryer; Bob Constan; Denise Malinowski-Maxwell; Tom Wencel

Area
  - City: 11.75 sq mi (30.42 km^{2})
  - Land: 11.74 sq mi (30.40 km^{2})
  - Water: 0.0077 sq mi (0.02 km^{2})
- Elevation: 607 ft (185 m)

Population (2020)
  - City: 63,292
  - Density: 5,392.3/sq mi (2,081.99/km^{2})
  - Metro: 4,285,832 (Metro Detroit)
- Time zone: UTC-5 (EST)
  - Summer (DST): UTC-4 (EDT)
- ZIP code(s): 48125, 48127
- Area code: 313
- FIPS code: 26-21020
- GNIS feature ID: 0624433
- Website: dearbornheightsmi.gov

Dearborn Heights is a city in Wayne County in the U.S. state of Michigan. An inner-ring suburb of Detroit, Dearborn Heights is located about 12 miles (19 km) west of downtown Detroit. The city shares a small border with Detroit, and is considered a bedroom community. As of the 2020 census, the city had a population of 63,292.

== History ==
Dearborn Heights was incorporated from the two discontinuous sections of Dearborn Township and a quarter-mile connecting strip of land from the village of Inkster. Incorporation petitions were filed on Friday, March 4, 1960, while Inkster officials delivered their petitions for incorporation on Monday, March 7, 1960. The residents approved Dearborn Heights' incorporation on an election held June 20, 1960, which is the official date of incorporation. Inkster, a predominantly black community, filed a lawsuit, claiming that the shape of Dearborn Heights reflected a racial gerrymander. The Michigan Supreme Court held that Inkster had failed to demonstrate any legally cognizable harm and dismissed the lawsuit.

== Geography ==
According to the United States Census Bureau, the city has a total area of 11.75 square miles (30.43 km^{2}), of which 11.74 square miles (30.41 km^{2}) is land and 0.01 square miles (0.03 km^{2}) (0.09%) is water.

The southern portion of the city is in the watershed of the north branch of the Ecorse Creek (also known as Ecorse River). The area surrounding the Ecorse is subject to flooding. The northern portion of the city is in the Rouge River watershed.

== Demographics ==
Historical population
Census	Pop.	Note	%±
1930	1,345		—
1940	8,052		498.7%
1950	20,235		151.3%
1960	61,118		202.0%
1970	80,069		31.0%
1980	67,706		−15.4%
1990	60,838		−10.1%
2000	58,264		−4.2%
2010	57,774		−0.8%
2020	63,292		9.6%
U.S. Decennial Census

=== Racial and ethnic composition ===
Dearborn Heights city, Michigan – Racial and ethnic composition Note: the US Census treats Hispanic/Latino as an ethnic category. This table excludes Latinos from the racial categories and assigns them to a separate category. Hispanics/Latinos may be of any race.
Race / Ethnicity (NH = Non-Hispanic)	Pop 2000	Pop 2010	Pop 2020	% 2000	% 2010	% 2020
White alone (NH)	52,032	47,943	49,946	89.30%	82.98%	78.91%
Black or African American alone (NH)	1,224	4,490	6,091	2.10%	7.77%	9.62%
Native American or Alaska Native alone (NH)	196	196	162	0.34%	0.34%	0.26%
Asian alone (NH)	1,289	995	1,055	2.21%	1.72%	1.67%
Native Hawaiian or Pacific Islander alone (NH)	4	9	7	0.01%	0.02%	0.01%
Other race alone (NH)	54	75	261	0.09%	0.13%	0.41%
Mixed race or Multiracial (NH)	1,491	1,354	2,629	2.56%	2.34%	4.15%
Hispanic or Latino (any race)	1,974	2,712	3,141	3.39%	4.69%	4.96%
Total	58,264	57,774	63,292	100.00%	100.00%	100.00%

=== 2020 census ===
As of the 2020 census, Dearborn Heights had a population of 63,292. The median age was 35.7 years. 24.9% of residents were under the age of 18 and 14.9% of residents were 65 years of age or older. For every 100 females there were 97.4 males, and for every 100 females age 18 and over there were 94.8 males age 18 and over.

100.0% of residents lived in urban areas, while 0.0% lived in rural areas.

There were 22,904 households in Dearborn Heights, of which 33.6% had children under the age of 18 living in them. Of all households, 44.3% were married-couple households, 20.8% were households with a male householder and no spouse or partner present, and 29.2% were households with a female householder and no spouse or partner present. About 27.9% of all households were made up of individuals and 12.9% had someone living alone who was 65 years of age or older.

There were 24,076 housing units, of which 4.9% were vacant. The homeowner vacancy rate was 1.4% and the rental vacancy rate was 5.7%.

Racial composition as of the 2020 census
Race	Number	Percent
White	50,868	80.4%
Black or African American	6,198	9.8%
American Indian and Alaska Native	219	0.3%
Asian	1,062	1.7%
Native Hawaiian and Other Pacific Islander	14	0.0%
Some other race	1,060	1.7%
Two or more races	3,871	6.1%

=== 2010 census ===
As of the census of 2010, there were 57,774 people, 22,266 households, and 14,591 families living in the city. The population density was 4,921.1 inhabitants per square mile (1,900.0/km^{2}). There were 24,068 housing units at an average density of 2,050.1 per square mile (791.5/km^{2}). The racial makeup of the city was 86.1% White, 7.9% African American, 0.4% Native American, 1.7% Asian, 1.0% from other races, and 2.8% from two or more races. Hispanic or Latino of any race were 4.7% of the population.

There were 22,266 households, of which 32.1% had children under the age of 18 living with them, 46.0% were married couples living together, 13.9% had a female householder with no husband present, 5.7% had a male householder with no wife present, and 34.5% were non-families. 30.1% of all households were made up of individuals, and 13.5% had someone living alone who was 65 years of age or older. The average household size was 2.57 and the average family size was 3.23.

The median age in the city was 38.3 years. 25% of residents were under the age of 18; 8.6% were between the ages of 18 and 24; 25.2% were from 25 to 44; 25.2% were from 45 to 64; and 16.1% were 65 years of age or older. The gender makeup of the city was 48.4% male and 51.6% female.

In 2014 the Dearborn Heights director of community and economic development, Ron Amen, stated that Arabs are about 25% of the city's population. Many Arab businesses in Dearborn have established branch operations in Dearborn Heights.

=== 2000 census ===
As of the census of 2000, there were 58,264 people, 23,276 households, and 15,781 families living in the city. The population density was 4,973.1 inhabitants per square mile (1,920.1/km^{2}). There were 23,913 housing units at an average density of 2,041.1 per square mile (788.1/km^{2}). The racial makeup of the city was 91.64% White, 2.12% African American, 0.37% Native American, 2.24% Asian, 0.01% Pacific Islander, 0.81% from other races, and 2.81% from two or more races. Hispanic or Latino of any race were 3.39% of the population. 19.8% were of Polish, 12.3% German, 8.8% Arab, 8.3% Italian, 8.0% Irish and 5.3% English ancestry according to Census 2000. 82.1% spoke English, 6.6% Arabic, 2.3% Polish, 2.1% Spanish, 1.5% Italian and 1.0% Macedonian as their first language.

There were 23,276 households, out of which 27.5% had children under the age of 18 living with them, 52.7% were married couples living together, 10.8% had a female householder with no husband present, and 32.2% were non-families. 28.0% of all households were made up of individuals, and 13.0% had someone living alone who was 65 years of age or older. The average household size was 2.47 and the average family size was 3.04.

In the city, the population was spread out, with 22.5% under the age of 18, 7.5% from 18 to 24, 29.5% from 25 to 44, 21.7% from 45 to 64, and 18.7% who were 65 years of age or older. The median age was 39 years. For every 100 females, there were 93.2 males. For every 100 females age 18 and over, there were 90.4 males.

The median income for a household in the city was $48,222, and the median income for a family was $54,392. Males had a median income of $45,226 versus $29,234 for females. The per capita income for the city was $22,829. About 4.4% of families and 6.1% of the population were below the poverty line, including 8.5% of those under age 18 and 4.7% of those age 65 or over.

== Economy ==
As of 2014 the largest employer in the city is the city government itself. The second largest employer is H.Y.P.E Athletics, which has over 200 employees.

== Politics ==
In the 2024 United States presidential election, within Dearborn Heights, 44% of the residents voted for Donald Trump, 38.3% voted for Kamala Harris, and 15.1% voted for Jill Stein.

== Education ==
=== Primary and secondary schools ===
==== Public schools ====
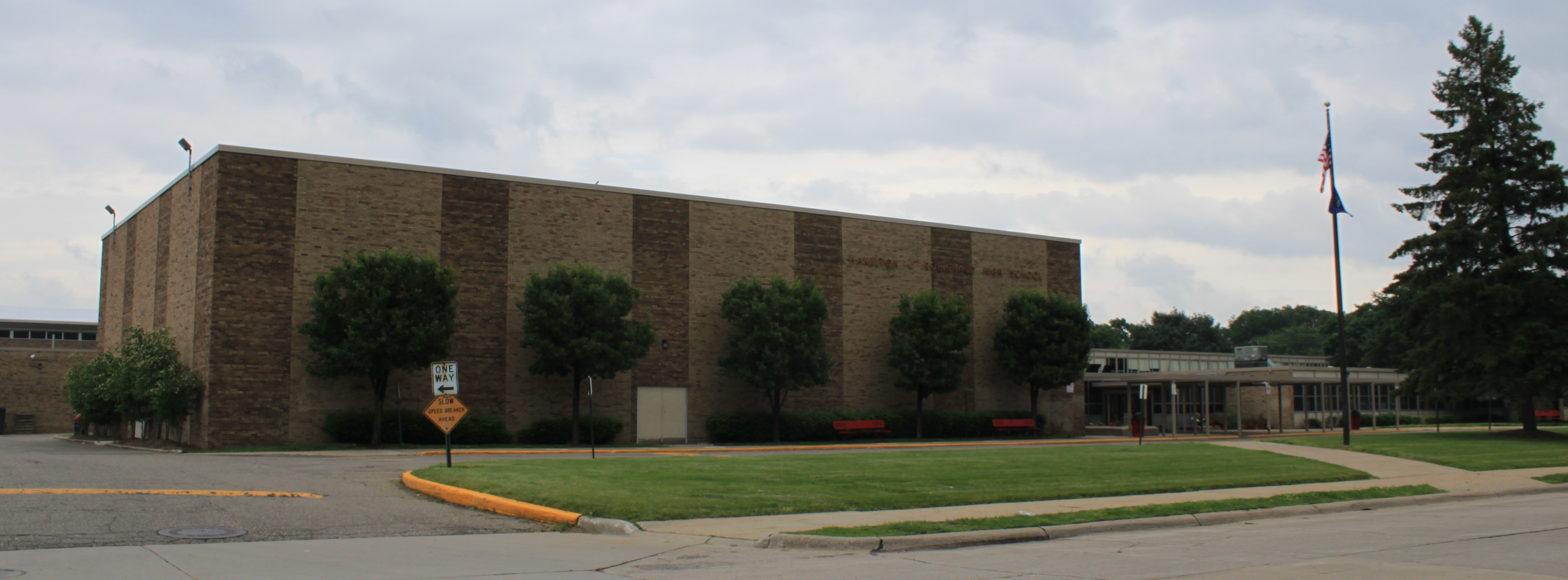
Robichaud High School

Dearborn Heights is divided into five school districts. Most north end residents are in the Crestwood School District or Dearborn Public Schools, while south end residents fall into the Westwood Community School District or the Dearborn Heights No. 7 School District. There are three zoned high Schools within the Dearborn Heights city limits: Crestwood High School on Beech Daly Road (Crestwood School District), Hamilton Robichaud High School on Janet Street (Westwood Community Schools), and Annapolis High School on Clippert Street (Dearborn Heights District No. 7).

Dearborn Center for Math, Science and Technology, a Dearborn schools magnet school, is in Dearborn Heights. Residents in Dearborn Public Schools are zoned to either River Oaks (in Dearborn Heights), Haigh, or Lindberg elementary schools. Middle schools serving that section include Bryant and Smith. Dearborn High School serves all residents of Dearborn Heights in Dearborn schools.

A small portion is within the Wayne-Westland Community Schools. It is zoned to Hicks Elementary School in Inkster, Franklin Middle School in Wayne, and John Glenn High School in Westland.

Portions of Dearborn Heights in the Taylor School District are assigned to Taylor Parks Elementary School, Hoover Middle School, and Harry S. Truman High School, all in Taylor.

Charter schools:

- Clara B. Ford Academy is in Dearborn Heights.
- Global Educational Excellence operates one charter school in Dearborn Heights: Global Heights Academy (K-5).

Prior to 2011, Universal Learning Academy had two campuses in Dearborn Heights. It is now in Westland.

==== Private schools ====
The Roman Catholic Archdiocese of Detroit operates two Catholic K-8 schools:

- St. Anselm Catholic School - Established in 1955
- St. Linus Catholic School (Dearborn Heights)

The archdiocese once operated St. Mel Elementary School in Dearborn Heights, which closed in 2005, and St. Sebastian School, which was established in the 1950s and closed in 2019. It also once operated St. Albert the Great.

=== Post-secondary education ===
A campus of Henry Ford College was located in the north end from the mid-1970s until 2014.

=== Public libraries ===
The Dearborn Heights Library System operates the Caroline Kennedy Library and the John F. Kennedy Jr. Library.
