= Global Educational Excellence =

Global Educational Excellence (GEE) Global Educational Excellence (GEE) is a for-profit charter school management company headquartered in Ann Arbor, Michigan. The organization was founded in 1998 by Mohamad Issa and Said Issa. Since its establishment, GEE has focused on managing and supporting public charter schools that serve diverse student populations, particularly in urban communities across Michigan.

As of 2025, the company operates 13 charter schools in Michigan and one international school in Riyadh, Saudi Arabia. GEE provides administrative oversight, academic support, and compliance management for its schools, with an emphasis on academic achievement, community engagement, and multicultural education.

== Schools ==
=== Michigan ===
Ann Arbor, Michigan:

- Central Academy (Pre-K to 12)

Dearborn, Michigan:

- Riverside Academy East (PreK to 5)
- Riverside Academy West (6–12)
- GEE Prep-Dearborn Campus (K-12)

Dearborn Heights, Michigan:

- Global Heights Academy (K-8)

Detroit, Michigan:

- Frontier International Academy-Detroit (grades K-5 & 9-12)
- Bridge Academy West (6-8)

Hamtramck, Michigan:

- Bridge Academy East Campus (PreK-5)
- GEE Prep-Dearborn Campus (K-12)

Southfield, Michigan:

- Pillars Academy (K-8)

Ypsilanti, Michigan:

- Global Tech Academy (PreK-5)
- Pittsfield Acres Academy (K-5)
- GEE Compass Academy (K-12)

Clinton Township, Michigan:

- Red Oak Academy (K-8)

Warren, Michigan:

- Unity Academy (K-8)
- Frontier International-Warren (K-5)

=== Saudi Arabia ===
Riyadh, Saudia Arabia

- Modern Global International School-Qurtoba Campus
- Modern Global International School-Digital City Campus
