= Belleville High School (Michigan) =

Public school in Michigan, United States

Location
- 501 West Columbia Ave; Belleville, Michigan, (Wayne County) 48111; United States; 42°12′12″N 83°29′35″W

Information
- School type: Public Secondary
- Motto: Purpose, Excellence, and Achievement
- Established: 1869
- School district: Van Buren Public Schools
- Principal: Nicole Crockett
- Teaching staff: 75.80 (FTE)
- Grades: 9-12
- Enrollment: 1,705 (2023–2024)
- Student to teacher ratio: 22.49
- Colors: Orange and black
- Nickname: Tigers
- Rivals: Romulus High School Eagles; Lincoln High School Railsplitters
- Yearbook: Tiger Lore
- Educational-access station: WBHS Channel 19
- Website: https://www.vanburenschools.net/o/belleville-high
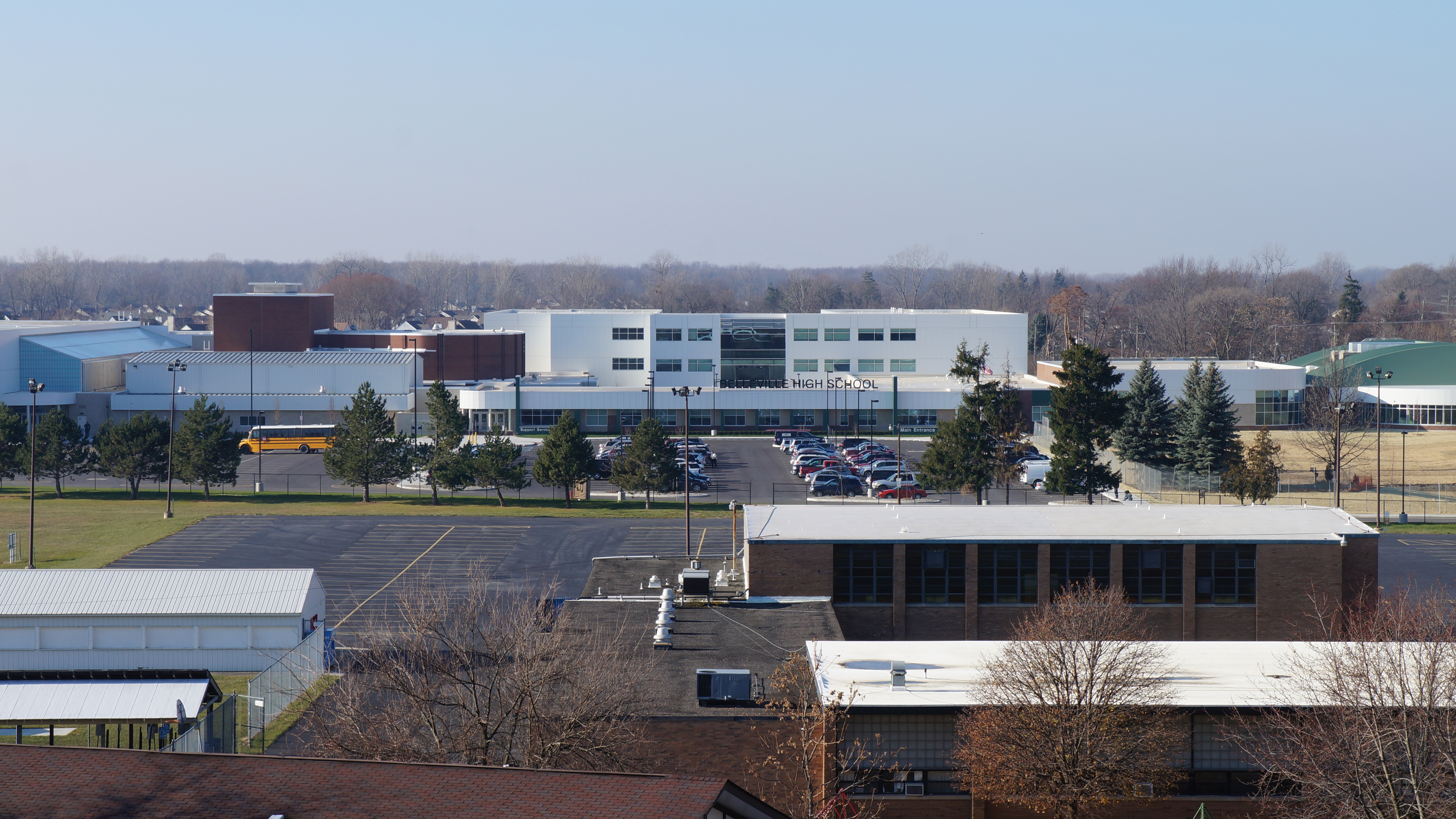
- The current Belleville High School completed in 2012

Student assessments
- 2021–22 school year Change vs. prior year

M-STEP 11th grade proficiency rates (Science / Social Studies)
- Advanced %: 0.1 / 2.4
- Proficient %: 0.3 / 5.7
- PR. Proficient %: 6.3 / 27.4
- Not Proficient %: 93.3 / 65.3

Average test scores
- SAT Total: 872 (▼ −114.3)

Belleville High School is a public high school located in Belleville, Michigan and the only zoned high school in the Van Buren School District.

== History ==
In 1953, a fire destroyed the third floor of Belleville High School. The blaze began in a basement store room and swept to the second and third floors via a nearby ventilating shaft. No one was injured, but the second and third floors were damaged beyond use for the rest of the school year. The third floor had remained closed, and before the demolition of the building classes continued on the first and second stories.

During the Winter of 2010, the Van Buren Public Schools Board of Education approved the accelerated schedule that the architect of Fanning Howey and Granger Construction presented. The new Belleville High School was built just east of the location where the old Belleville High School stood. The new school was completed in the Summer of 2012 and school was in session for the first time (at the new school) on September 4, 2012. The class of 2013 was the first to graduate from the new school.

As of August 2012, the old Belleville High School was demolished, excluding the music wing, auditorium, and cafeteria. The current building is still in use today.

== WBHS Channel 19 ==
In 2000, Comcast set the school up with an educational access station which would come to be called WBHS Channel 19. The station is almost entirely run by students taking the year-long "Channel 19" course with only the aid of one instructor and the occasional alumni volunteer. The station broadcasts the daily produced morning announcements, student projects, Semi-annual live telethons and other events from around the area which are either taped by the high school's T.E.C. Club or submitted by parents & staff. The station itself is shown on channel 19 as well as HD channel 902 in Comcast's Van Buren Township Corp, 9502.

== Athletics ==
Bellville has found success in a variety of sports, holding multiple state titles. Softball won back to back state championships in 1983 & 1984, and Football won back to back state championships in 2021 & 2022 followed by state runners up in 2023. Belleville's team rivals are the Lincoln High School Railsplitters and the Romulus High School Eagles.

== Mascot ==
Belleville’s mascot is the tiger. Since the 1960s the school has had an actor suited up for athletic and school events. Originally named “Paws” until 2022 when the tiger was reintroduced as “Tyrone The Tiger” the mascot is active on Instagram with over 600 followers.

== Notable alumni ==
- Billy Ashley, Los Angeles Dodgers, Boston Red Sox
- Juan Atkins, Belleville Three musician
- Gabe Brown, Toronto Raptors forward
- Ian Gold, Denver Broncos linebacker
- Arlington Hambright, football player
- Cullen Jenkins, Green Bay Packers defensive end
- Kris Jenkins, New York Jets defensive tackle
- Myra MacPherson (1952) journalist and writer
- Derrick May, Belleville Three musician
- Kaevon Merriweather, professional football player
- Frank Nunley, linebacker for the San Francisco 49ers
- Damon Payne, college football defensive tackle
- Myles Rowser, college football safety
- Kevin Saunderson, Belleville Three musician
- Keith Simons, Kansas City Chiefs defensive tackle
- Bryce Underwood, college football quarterback for the Michigan Wolverines
- Morgan Foreman State Representative - 33rd House District, Michigan House of Representatives
