= Annapolis High School (Michigan) =

High school in Dearborn Heights, Michigan, USA

Location
- 4650 Clippert Street; Dearborn Heights, Michigan 48125; United States; 42°16′33″N 83°14′50″W

Information
- Type: Comprehensive Public High School
- Motto: Achieving Higher Standards
- Established: 1967
- School district: Dearborn Heights Schools District No.7
- CEEB code: 230792
- Principal: Aaron Mollett
- Teaching staff: 39.40 (FTE)
- Grades: 9 to 12
- Gender: coed
- Enrollment: 679 (2023-2024)
- Student to teacher ratio: 17.23
- Campus type: Suburban
- Colors: Blue and gold
- Fight song: Fight on Cougars
- Athletics conference: Western Wayne Athletic Conference
- Nickname: Cougars
- Newspaper: The Cougar Crier
- Yearbook: The Catamount
- Website: ahsdhsd7.district7.net

Student assessments
- 2022–23 school year Change vs. prior year

M-STEP 11th grade proficiency rates (Science / Social Studies)
- Advanced %: 8.7 / ≤5
- Proficient %: 18.1 / ‐
- PR. Proficient %: 16.8 / 61.7
- Not Proficient %: 56.4 / 19.5

Average test scores
- SAT Total: 864.9 (▲ +15)

Annapolis High School is a high school located in Dearborn Heights, Michigan, United States. The school was established in 1967 (accredited in 1970) and is the only high school in Dearborn Heights School District #7. Annapolis High School is one of three high schools located in Dearborn Heights, the others being Crestwood High School and Robichaud High School.

== History ==
The school was built in the late 1950s and was known as Best Junior High School. It wasn't until November 29, 1966, at a school board meeting when it was decided that Annapolis High School was to be established. Annapolis opened their doors in Sept. 1967 to approximately 450 students. Annapolis High School was first accredited by the University of Michigan in 1970.

== Athletics ==
In 2002, the high school made headlines when it dropped its football program due to lack of student interest. This happened again in 2012 when the team did not have enough upperclassmen to support a varsity team, and the few varsity players that were left played JV football with the freshmen and sophomores. This resulted in controversy throughout the school's athletic conference.
