= Duboisville, Michigan =

Coordinates: 42°25′45.0″N 83°16′04.3″W

Duboisville was an unincorporated community in Wayne County, Michigan, USA, in the general vicinity of 7 Mile Road and Berg Road, which is now within the city boundaries of Detroit.

It was begun around the lumber mill of James Dubois in about 1850. Some sources say that it was projected around the mill in 1878 but it seems there was a community using this name before then. At the time, it was in what was then Redford Township.

Early on, Julius Ziegler, a merchant operating in the village, tried to have the place renamed for himself, but the original name of Duboisville was retained.

The town had a school called the Duboisville School. This continued to exist after the area was annexed to Detroit and operated as part of Detroit Public Schools until the 1980s.

Starting about 1900, the population of the village went into decline. In 1916, the lumbermill closed. At about this time, Duboisville merged with Sandhill to form the village of Redford. In 1926, the village of Redford voted to become part of Detroit.
