= Fanning Howey =

American architectural firm

Practice information
- Firm type: Architecture, interior design, engineering
- Founders: Ronald H. Fanning and Clair E. Howey
- Principals: Timothy Lehman; Andy Miller; Brian Butler; Alan Cradler; Jennifer Fuller; John Gladden; Dennis Hacker; Carla Remenschneider; Edward Sawa; Michael Schipp; Zachary Sprunger
- Founded: 1961
- Location: Celina, Ohio

Website
- fhai.com

Fanning Howey is an American architecture firm specializing in schools. It was established in 1961 by Ronald H. Fanning and Clair E. Howey. It has been called one of the world's largest school design firms.

== History ==
In 1976, Fanning Howey merged with Lee J. Brockway's architecture firm. As of 2000, Fanning Howey employed 96 registered architects in eleven offices. Between 1995 and 2000, it completed $2.8 billion in school construction projects. As of 2025, the firm has six offices throughout Indiana, Michigan, and Ohio.

== List of major projects ==
- Avon High School, Avon, Indiana, 1999
- Belleville High School, Belleville, Michigan, 2013
- Chesterton High School, Chesterton, Indiana 2000
- Cyprus High School, Magna, Utah, 2025
- Dakota High School (Michigan), Macomb Township, Michigan, 1995
- Eastern High School (Washington D.C.) renovations
- Gaylord High School, Gaylord, Michigan, 1994
- Holly High School, Holly, Michigan, 1999
- Leslie High School, Leslie, Michigan, 1997
- Lincoln Middle School, Indianapolis, Indiana, 1997
- Marysville High School, Marysville, Ohio
- Northville High School, Northville, Michigan, 2000
- Novi Middle School, Novi, Michigan, 1999
- Perrysburg High School, Perrysburg, Ohio, 1999
- Portsmouth Junior/Senior High School, Portsmouth, Ohio
- Rome Free Academy, Rome, New York
- Springboro High School, Springboro, Ohio
- Williamston High School, Williamston, Michigan
- Zionsville Community High School renovations, Zionsville, Indiana
