= Conners Creek, Michigan =

Unincorporated community in Michigan, US

Coordinates: 42°26′15″N 82°58′34″W

Conner's Creek was an unincorporated community in Wayne County, Michigan.

The area was first settled before 1800. It was originally named Trembly's Creek, after Joseph Trembly who was given 640 acres in the area where Fort Gratiot Road crossed the creek. He built a mill among other buildings in the area. Trembly's daughter Teresa married Richard Conner, and he came in possession of the land and the area was thus called Conner Creek.

In 1832 a large number of Germans came to the area to avoid the cholera epidemic in Detroit. It was officially laid out as a village in 1853. A post office was established in 1855. In 1893 the area was renamed Greiner after Michael Greiner who owned much of the area. It returned to the name of Conner Creek in 1899.

Some sources say it was located on Gratiot near 7 Mile Road. In 1917 the village voted to become part of the city of Detroit. At the time the population was in excess of 2,000.

== Sources ==
- Walter Romig, Michigan Place Names, p. 130.
