= Clara B. Ford Academy =

Charter school in Michigan, United States

Coordinates: 42°20′29.1″N 83°14′38.9″W

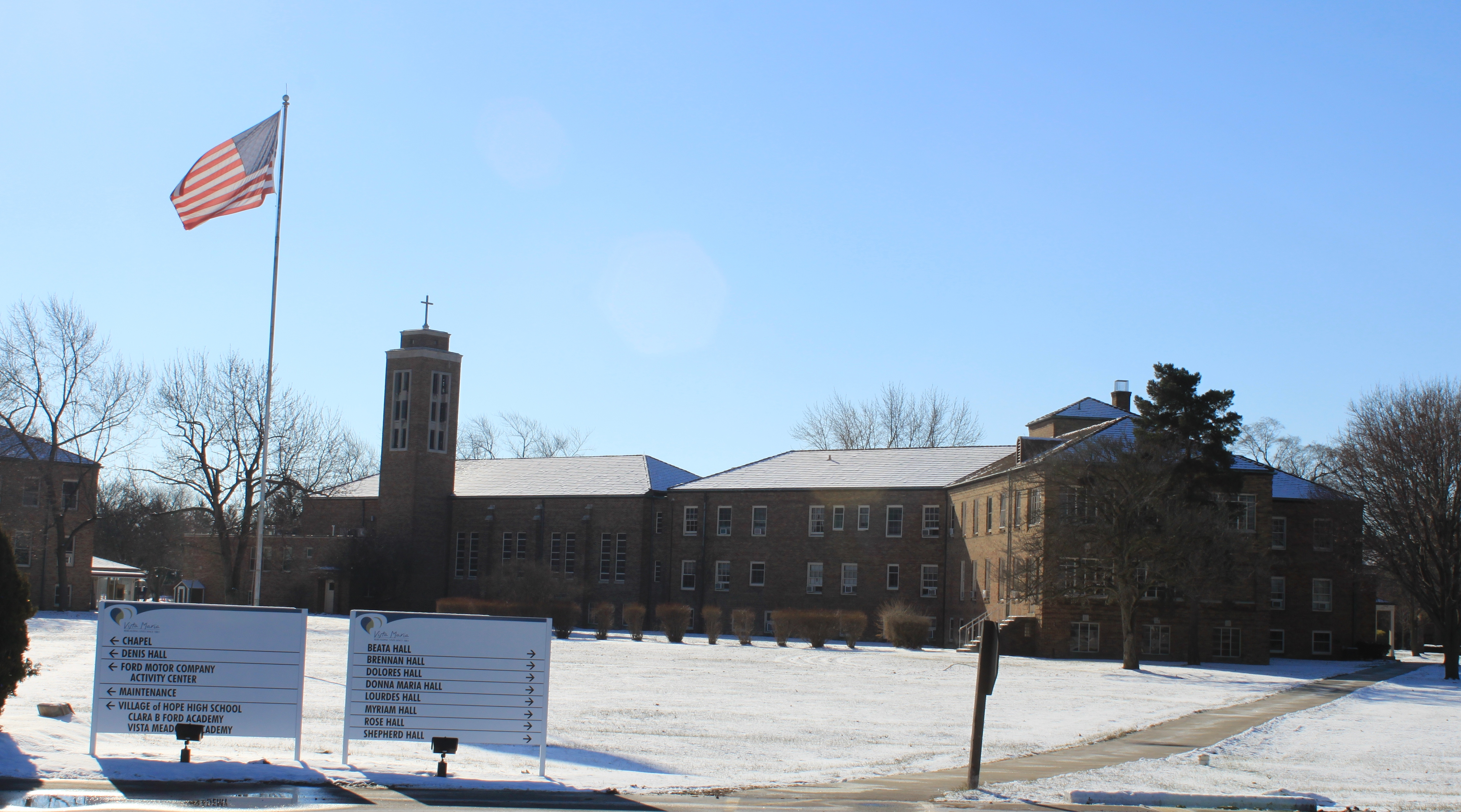

Information
- School type: Charter school
- Grades: 5-12

Clara B. Ford Academy is a charter school located in the city of Dearborn Heights, Michigan. The school is located at 20651 West Warren Avenue. The Sisters of the Good Shepherd ran a Detroit area outreach program for young women and in the 1930s began fundraising with the Salvation Army for a large campus. The automaker Henry Ford and his wife, Clara B. Ford, donated 50 acres of land. The residential school opened in 1942 as part of the Vista Maria facility. By the 1980s the facility had evolved into a lay-run "residential treatment and detention facility for young women, placed [t]here by the court". The school has grades 5 - 12 and serves about 170 students at any time but 450 individuals in a school year. For some years Clara B. Ford was operated by the Dearborn School District although it is located in Dearborn Heights.

== See also ==
- List of public school academy districts in Michigan
