= Wayne County, Michigan =

County in Michigan, United States

Coordinates: 42.28°N 83.26°W

Wayne County
- Charter County
- Charter County of Wayne
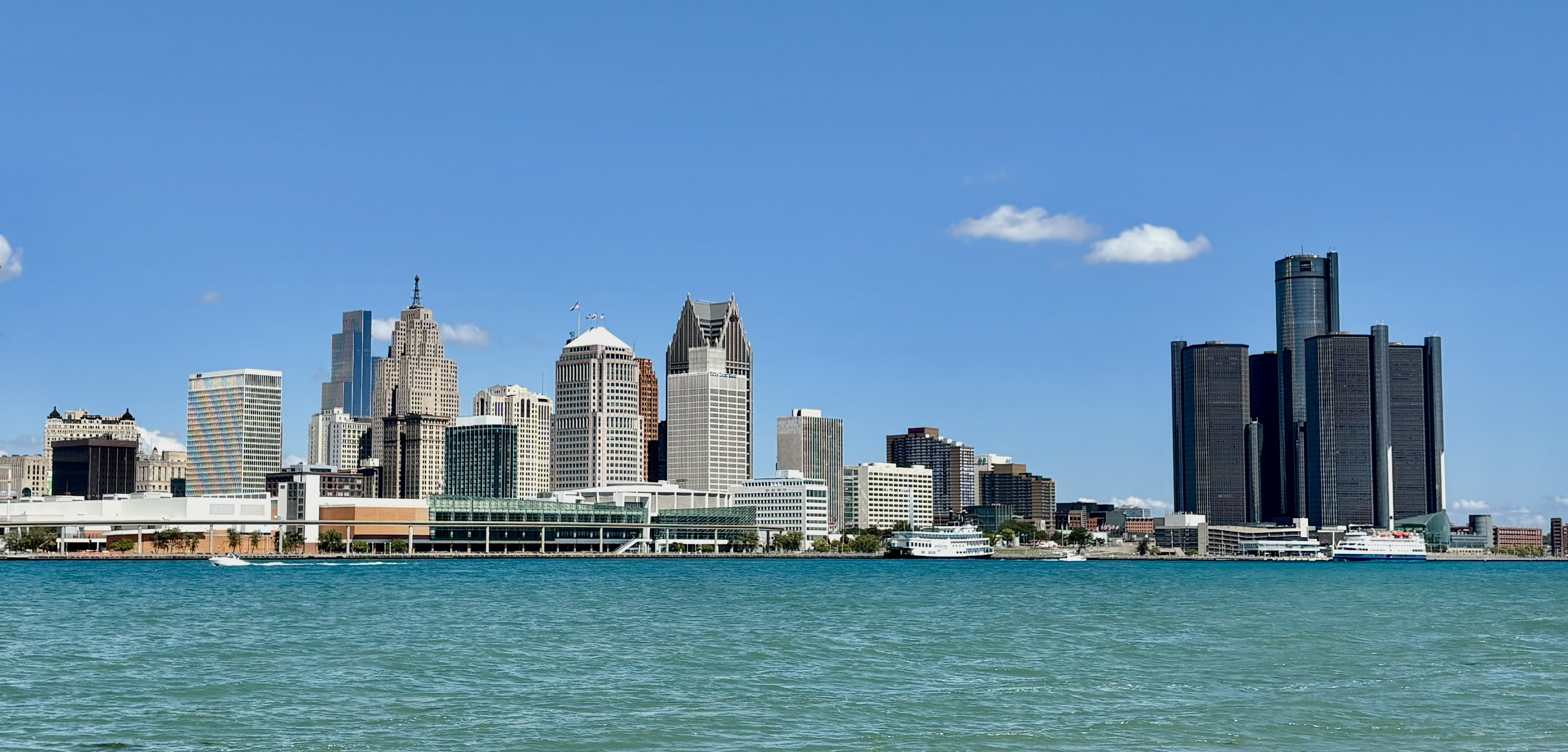
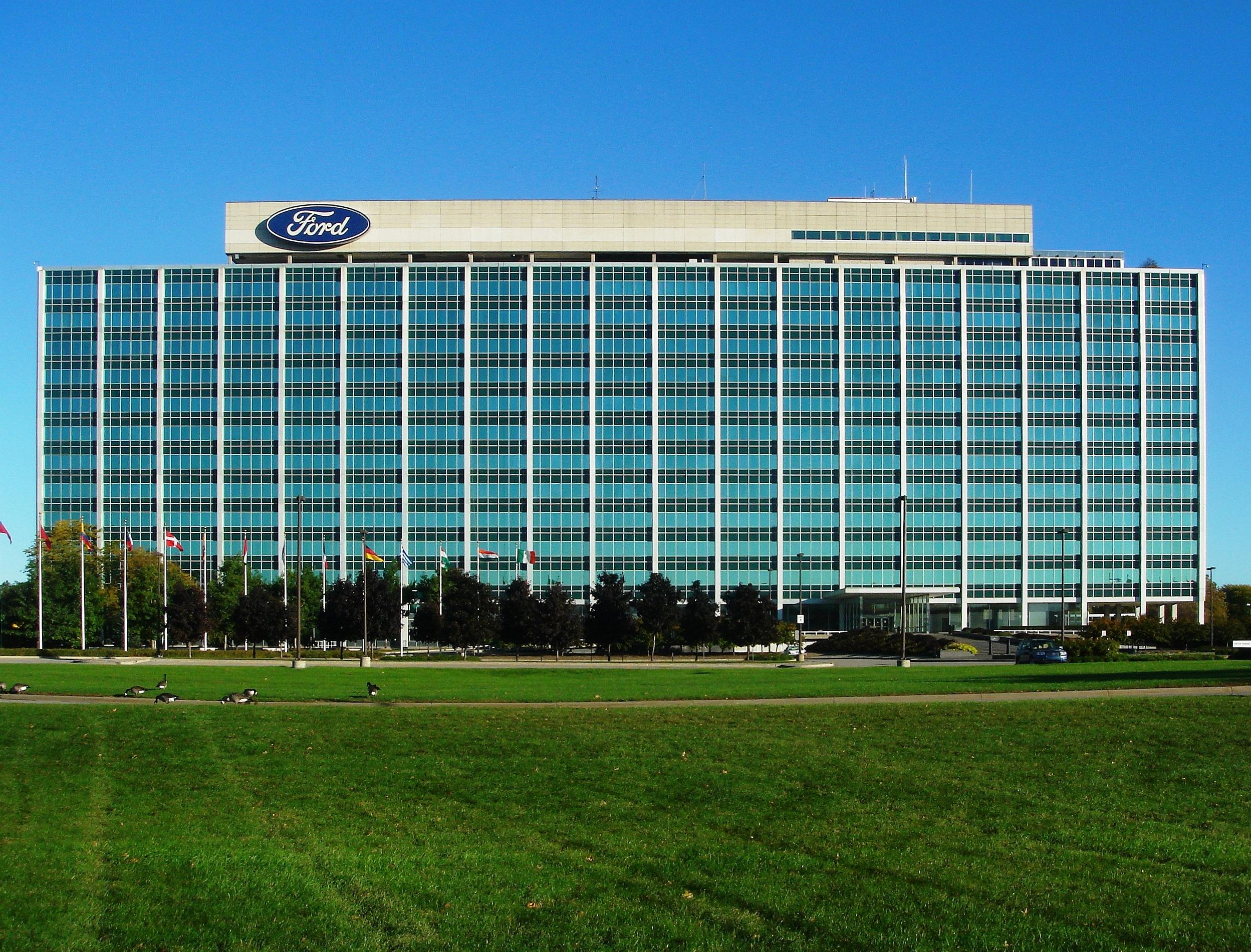
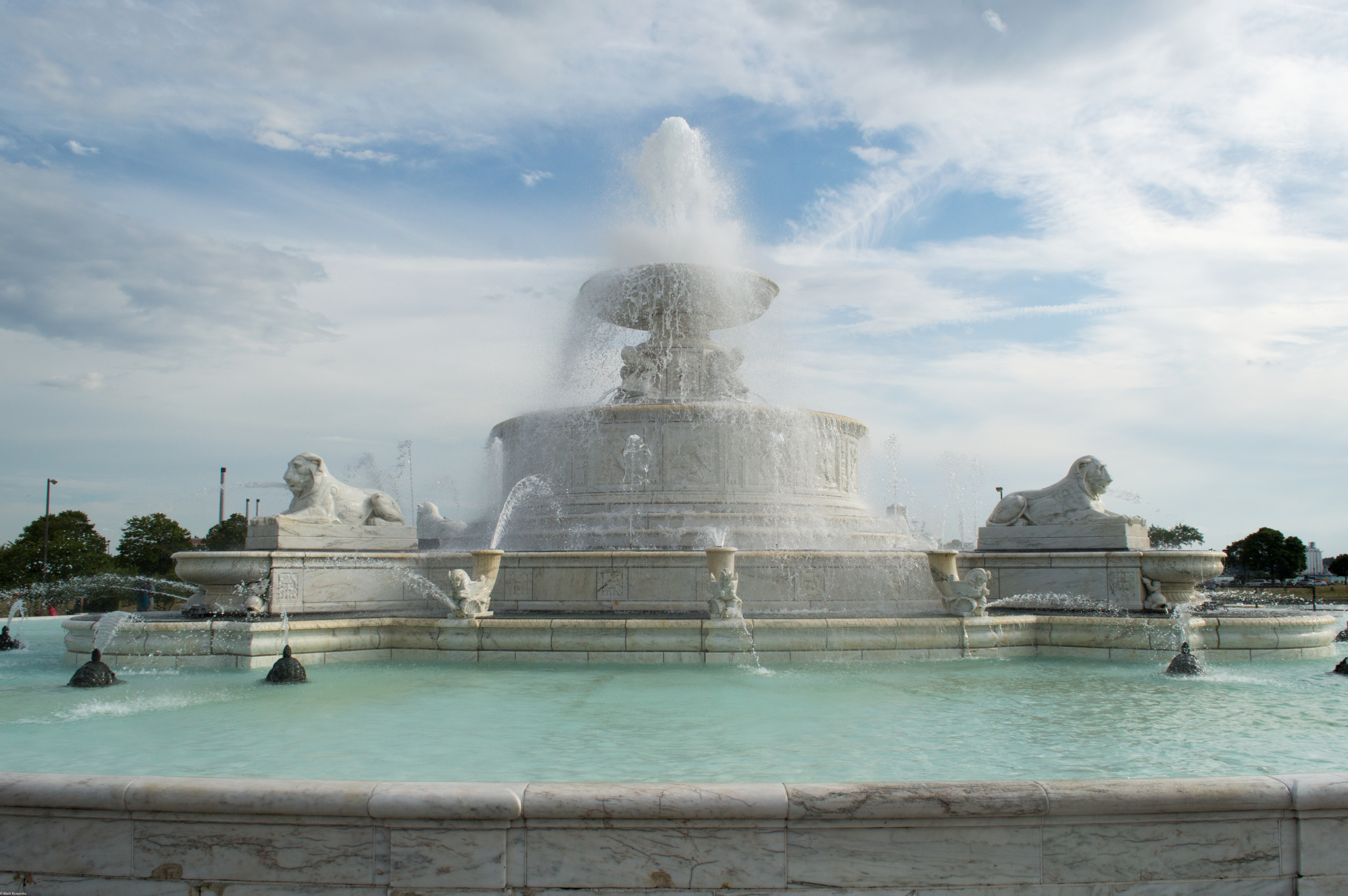
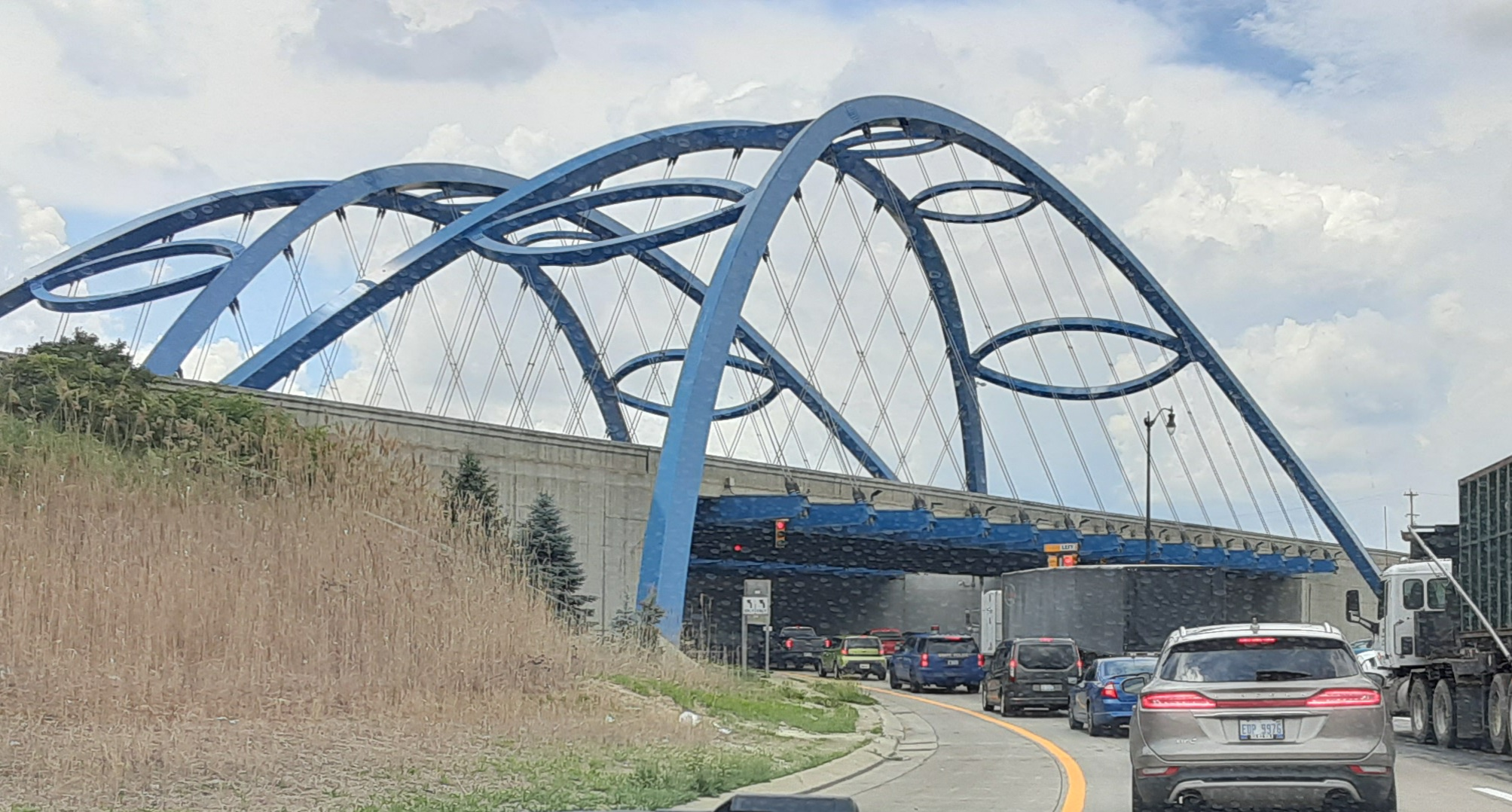
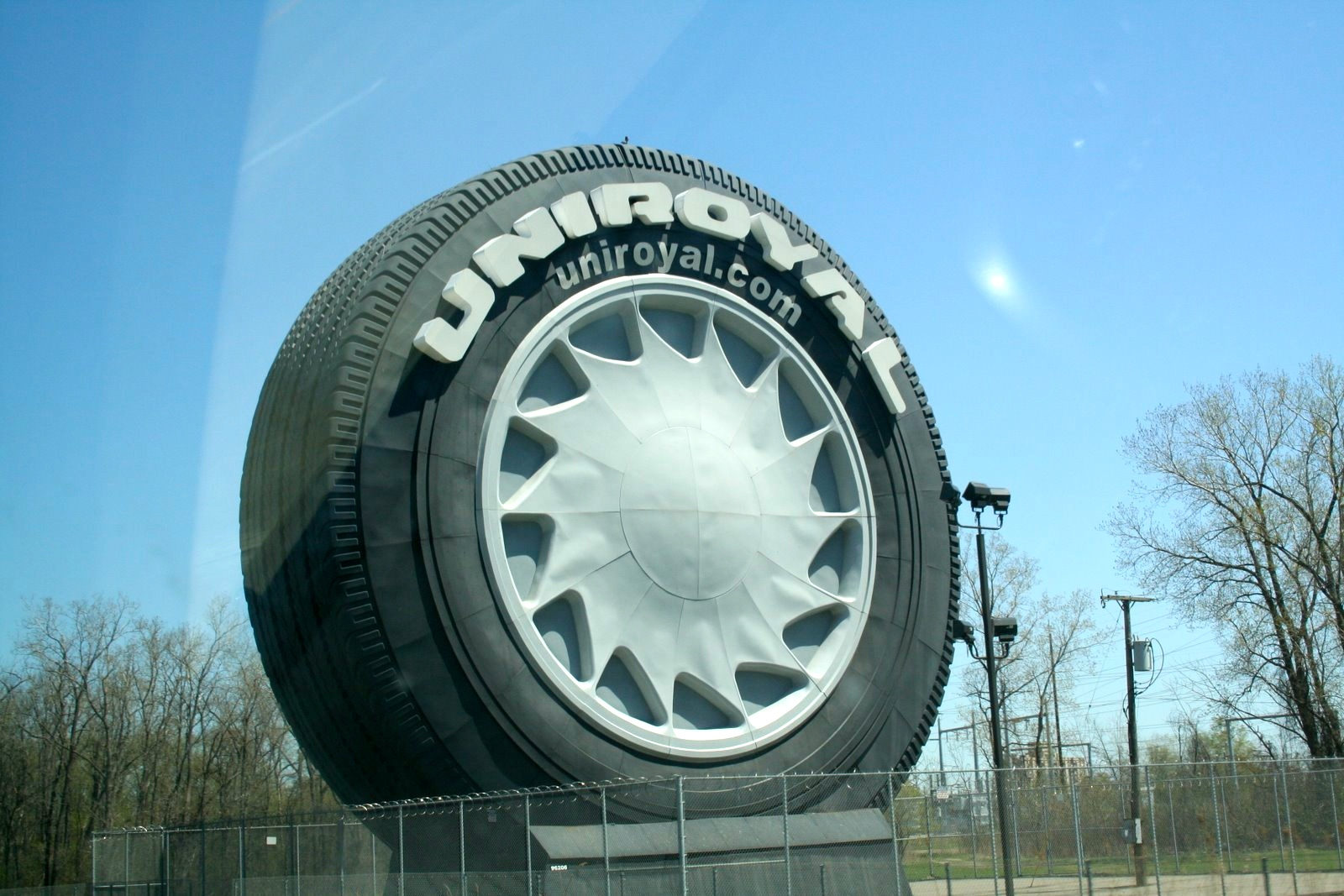
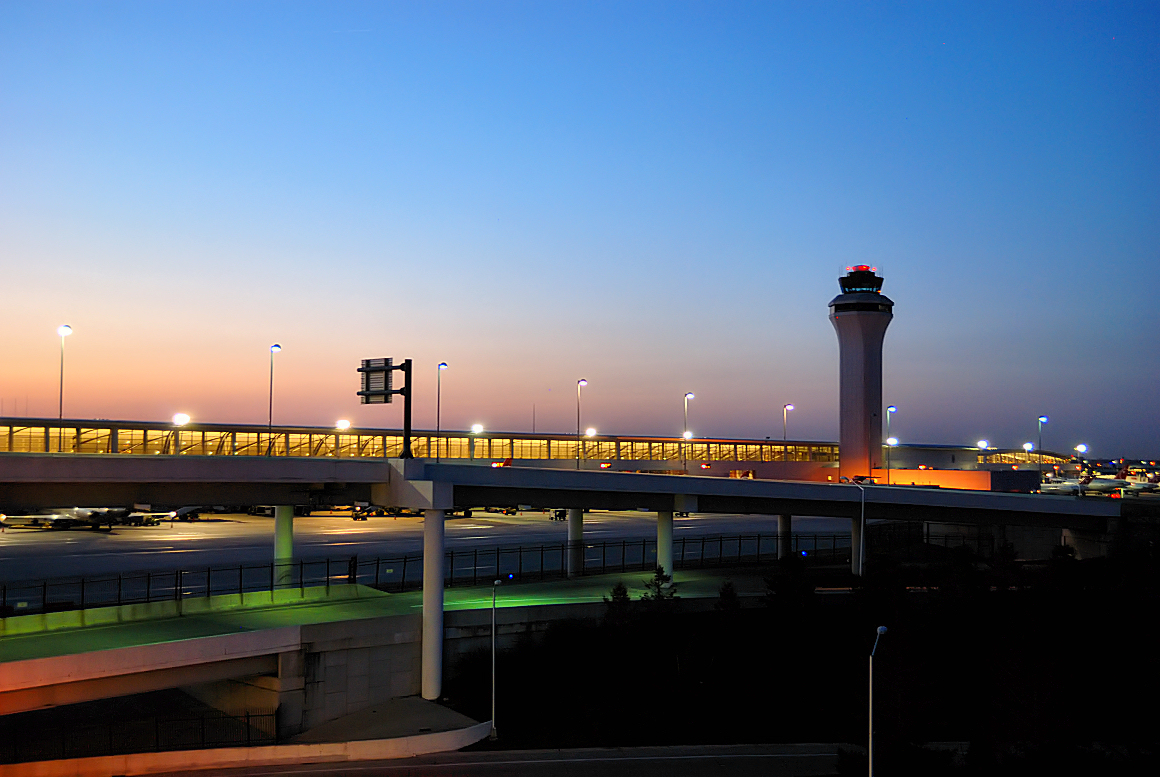
- Left to right, top to bottom: Downtown Detroit, Henry Ford II World Center, James Scott Memorial Fountain, Gateway Bridge, the Uniroyal Giant Tire and the Detroit Metropolitan Airport

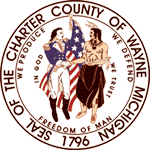
- Flag Seal Wordmark

- Location in Michigan

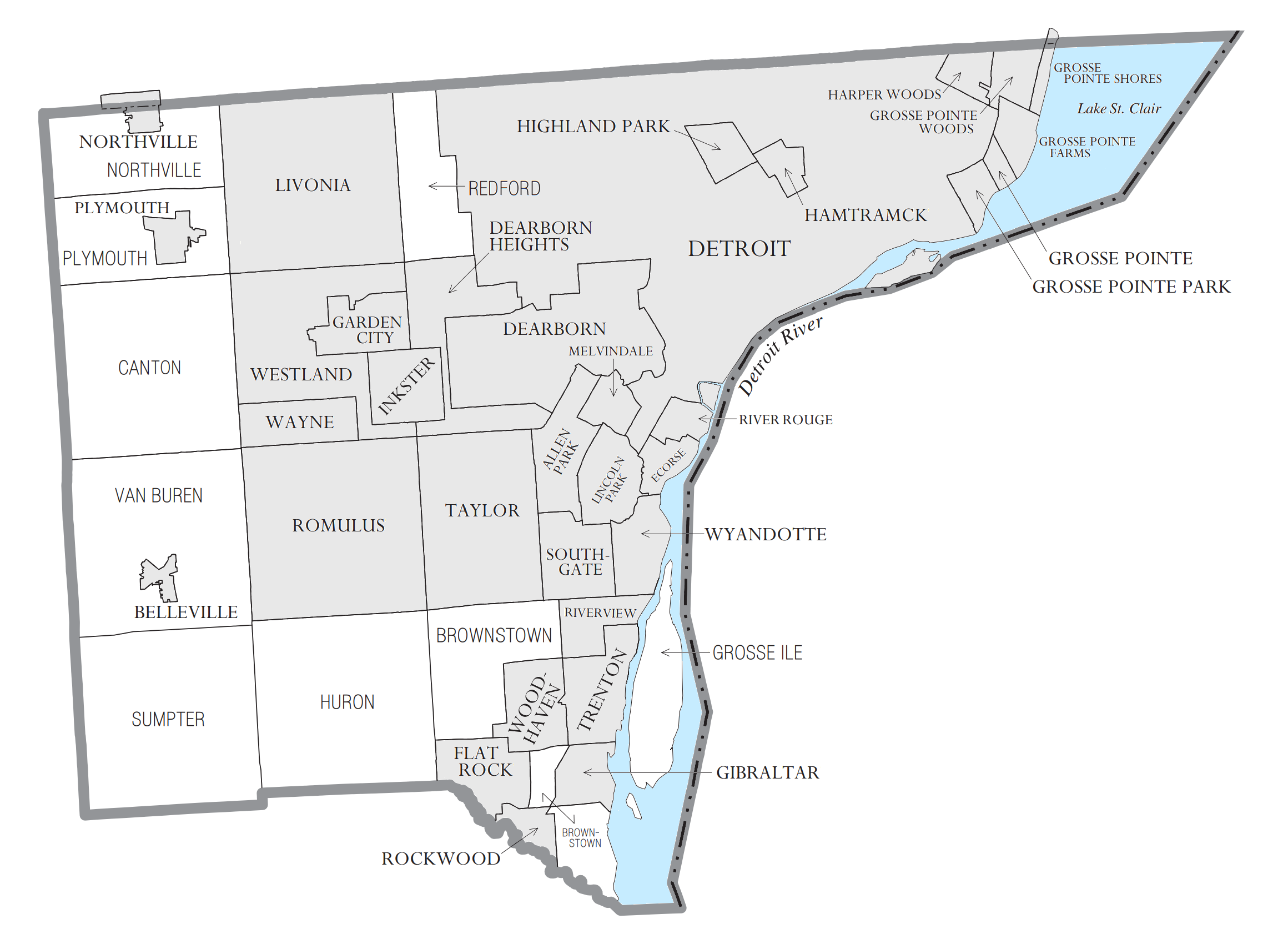
- Municipalities in Wayne County
- Country: United States
- State: Michigan
- Region: Metro Detroit
- Incorporated: 1796 (created); 1815 (organized)
- Named for: Anthony Wayne
- County seat and Largest city: Detroit

Government
  - Executive: Warren Evans

Area
  - Total: 673 sq mi (1,740 km^{2})
  - Land: 612 sq mi (1,590 km^{2})
  - Water: 61 sq mi (160 km^{2}) 9%

Population (2020)
  - Total: 1,793,561
  - Estimate (2025): 1,769,038 ▼
  - Density: 2,930/sq mi (1,130/km^{2})
- Demonym: Detroiter

GDP
  - Total: $129.920 billion (2024)
- Time zone: UTC−5 (Eastern Time Zone)
  - Summer (DST): UTC−4 (Eastern Daylight Time)
- Area codes: 313, 734, 248
- Website: waynecountymi.gov

Wayne County is the most populous county in the U.S. state of Michigan. As of 2020, the United States census placed its population at 1,793,561, making it the 19th-most populous county in the United States. The county seat and the largest city in the county is Detroit, the 26th-most populous city in the United States and the largest U.S. city on the Canada–United States border.

The county was founded in 1796 and organized in 1815, the application for the territory that would become the State of Michigan. Wayne County is included in the Detroit-Warren-Dearborn, MI Metropolitan Statistical Area. It is one of several U.S. counties named after Revolutionary War-era general Anthony Wayne.

== History ==
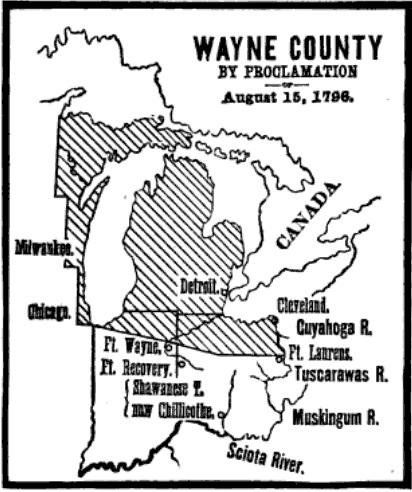
Original Wayne County of the Northwest Territory

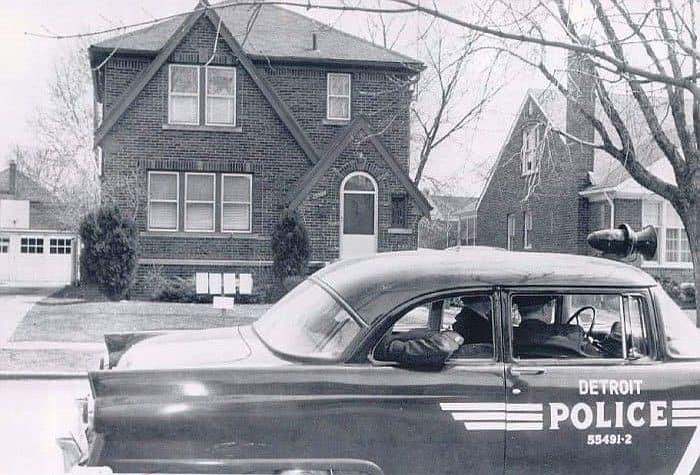
Wayne County in 1955

Wayne County was the sixth county in the Northwest Territory, formed August 15, 1796, from portions of territorial Hamilton County, territorial Knox County, and unorganized territory. It was named for the U.S. general "Mad Anthony" Wayne. It originally encompassed the entire area of the Lower Peninsula of Michigan, most of the Upper Peninsula, as well as smaller sections that are now part of northern Ohio, Indiana, Illinois and Wisconsin. By proclamation of the Territorial Secretary and Acting Governor, Winthrop Sargent, on August 15, 1796, the boundaries of Wayne County were declared to begin at the mouth of the Cuyahoga River then west to Fort Wayne, then to the southernmost point of Lake Michigan and along the western shore north to the territorial boundary in Lake Superior and then along the territorial boundary through Lake Huron, Lake St. Clair, and Lake Erie back to the starting point. The first division of the county into townships occurred November 1, 1798, into the four townships of Detroit, Hamtramck, Mackinaw, and Sargent. The extent of Wayne county at that time included all the present state of Michigan in addition to parts of Indiana, Ohio, and Wisconsin, so that the townships erected at that time were vastly larger than the corresponding divisions of the present time.

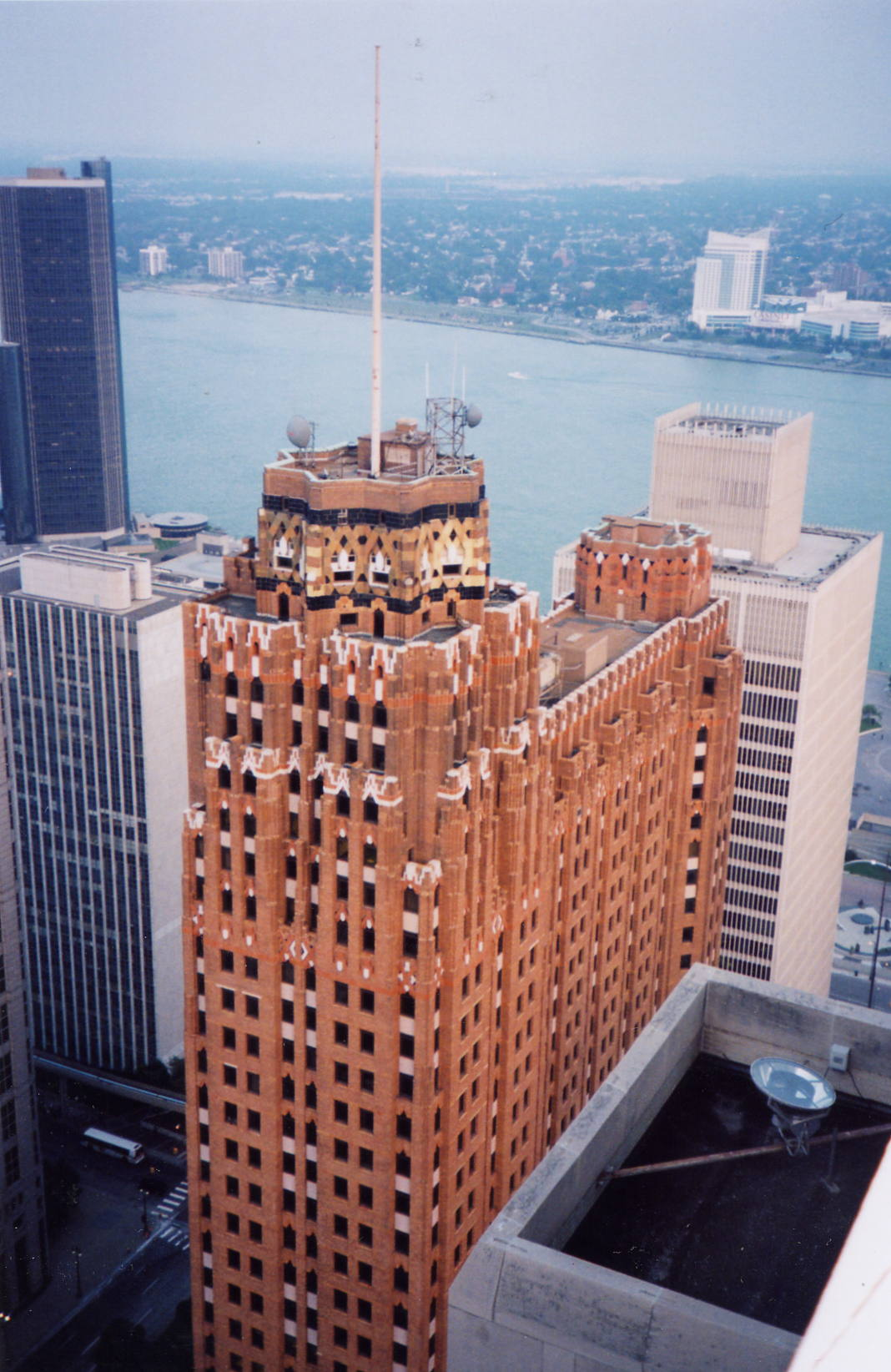
The historic Guardian Building in Detroit is the Wayne County headquarters.

On January 14, 1803, the Governor of Indiana Territory, William Henry Harrison, issued a similar proclamation defining the boundaries as beginning at a point where an east and west line passing through the southernmost extreme of Lake Michigan would intersect a north and south line, passing through the westernmost extreme of the lake, then north to the territorial boundary, then along said boundary line to a point where an east and west line passing through the southerly extreme of Lake Michigan would intersect the same, then along this last mentioned line to the place of beginning. This boundary would include Chicago, Illinois, and a sizable strip of Wisconsin along Lake Michigan.

These boundaries would be adjusted as Indiana and Illinois became states and as other counties were formed within Michigan Territory.

== Geography ==
According to the U.S. Census Bureau, the county has a total area of 673 square miles (1,740 km^{2}), of which 612 square miles (1,590 km^{2}) is land and 61 square miles (160 km^{2}) (9.0%) is water. Its water area includes parts of the Detroit River and Lake St. Clair.

Wayne County borders Oakland County and Macomb County to the north, Washtenaw County to the west, Essex County, Ontario, Canada to the east, and Monroe County to the south.

The eastern (and sometimes southern) boundary is a water boundary in the Detroit River and Lake St. Clair with Essex County, Ontario. Automotive traffic crosses this boundary at the Detroit–Windsor Tunnel and the Ambassador Bridge. Due to the southwestern course of the river, this small portion of Canada actually lies to the south of Wayne County. The southern communities of the county are usually referred to as Downriver, in reference to their location downstream of downtown Detroit.

Grosse Ile is the largest island in the county and is connected to the mainland by the Wayne County Bridge and the Grosse Ile Toll Bridge. The highest elevation (990 feet (300 m)) in the county is in Maybury State Park in Northville Township.

=== Adjacent counties ===
- Washtenaw County (west)
- Monroe County (south/southwest)
- Essex County, Ontario, Canada (east/southeast)
- Lambton County, Ontario, Canada (east/northeast across Lake St. Clair)
- Macomb County (north/northeast)
- Oakland County (north)

=== National protected area ===
- Detroit River International Wildlife Refuge (part)

== Transportation ==
=== Wayne County Department of Public Services ===
The Wayne County Department of Public Services was formed in 1906 as the Wayne County Road Commission. It was the government agency in Wayne County, Michigan responsible for building and maintaining the county's roads and highways.

Its first commissioners were Edward N. Hines, Cassius R. Benton, and automobile manufacturer Henry Ford. While the commission was authorized by an 80% positive vote of county voters in a 1906 referendum, it was controversial and there was a Michigan state supreme court case pressed which found it unconstitutional. Commissioners Benton and Ford quit, but commissioner Hines persisted and led the commission through reorganization getting around the obstacles. Hines was a commissioner continuously from 1906 to 1938. Hines is credited with the idea of putting a painted line down a roadway's center to divide traffic, and other innovations that were later widely adopted.

The commission claims credit for constructing the country's first mile of concrete-paved rural highway, a section of Woodward Avenue just outside the Detroit city limits.

A number of the county road commissions' works are listed on the National Register of Historic Places.

The county road commission was merged into the general county government, becoming the Roads Division of the Department of Public Services.

=== Transit ===
- Detroit station is located in the New Center neighborhood and serves the Amtrak Wolverine intercity trains.
- The Detroit Bus Station is located in the Corktown neighborhood and serves intercity buses to destinations across the Midwest.
- The Detroit Department of Transportation and Suburban Mobility Authority for Regional Transportation provide local and regional bus service.
- The QLine operates streetcar service down Woodward Avenue.

=== Major highways ===
- I-75 through the Downriver communities, then through the southwest-side neighborhoods of Detroit and serves as the northern border of Downtown Detroit as the Fisher Freeway. It then turns away from the Fisher onto the Chrysler Freeway at a complex interchange with I-375 and an unnumbered extension which connects with M-3, then follows M-1, which is less than a mile away through the remainder of Detroit, connecting eastern Wayne County to Toledo and Flint to the south and north respectively. It runs non-stop to the Sault Ste. Marie International Bridge to the north and to Florida to the south.
- I-94 runs east–west through the central parts of Wayne County, connecting it to Port Huron eastbound and Chicago westbound. To the west it provides an uninterrupted route as far as Montana and connects to the northern side of the Detroit Metro Airport. In Detroit it is known as the Edsel Ford Freeway.
- I-96 has its eastern terminus in the county, in Detroit. It follows Grand River Avenue until the city's northwest side, there it turns due west to I-275, where it turns north to concurrent with I-275. West of Detroit to I-275 it is known as the Jeffries Freeway; in Detroit it is the Rosa Parks Memorial Highway, but it is sometimes still known as the Jeffries.
- I-275, most of whose mileage is in Wayne County, serves the southern side of the Detroit Metro Airport.
- I-375 is the nation's shortest Interstate Highway to be signed. However some highways are shorter but are not signed at all. It serves as the eastern boundary of Downtown Detroit and is a southern extension of the Chrysler Freeway. There are currently plans in the works to turn I-375 into a 6-lane boulevard. Construction will start in 2025 and is expected to finish by 2028.
- US 12 has its eastern terminus in Downtown Detroit at Cass Avenue. From there it travels through the west side of Detroit and through Dearborn and other points west and is a useful alternative to I-94. US 12 continues west through Michigan, passing through several US cities including Chicago and Minneapolis, eventually ending in the Pacific Northwest in Aberdeen, Washington. Locally it is known as Michigan Avenue.
- US 24 traverses through Downriver and the far west sides of Dearborn and Detroit and is a useful alternative to I-75. Locally it is known as Telegraph Road.
- US 10 entered the county by two ways. Initially it was via Woodward Avenue but when the Lodge Freeway was completed U.S. Route 10 was relocated onto it; the Woodward route became M-1. Later the existing highway was truncated in Bay City and M-10 replaced it on the Lodge.
- US 16 entered Wayne County on Grand River Avenue and ended in Downtown Detroit.
- US 25 was the designated name for Dix-Toledo Highway in Downriver and Fort Street and Gratiot Avenue in Detroit. The construction of I-75 resulted in the truncation of U.S. Route 25 to Cincinnati.
- US 112 followed Michigan Avenue out of Downtown Detroit and out of Wayne County. Is now a routing of U.S. Route 12.
- M-1 has its southern terminus in Downtown Detroit at Adams Street. It travels through Midtown Detroit and New Center and through Highland Park. It serves as an alternative to I-75 and M-10. Locally known as Woodward Avenue. M-1 was a result of US-10 being redesignated to the Lodge Freeway.
- M-3 has its southern terminus in Downtown Detroit at Randolph and Jefferson Avenue. It proceeds northeasterly through Detroit's northeast side and beyond towards Mount Clemens and points further north. Locally known as Gratiot Avenue. M-3 was the result of the removal of US-25 from Michigan.
- M-5 begins at the northern intersection with I-96 on Detroit's northwest side and follows Grand River Avenue out of the county.
- M-8 runs from I-96 to Conant Street in Detroit, passing through Highland Park. The freeway portion is known as the Davison Freeway.
- M-10 starts at the same intersection where M-3 starts in Downtown Detroit and travels further into the city on the Lodge Freeway and connects it to Southfield.
- M-14 starts at the interchange with I-96 and I-275 in Livonia and travels out into rural areas, serving Plymouth and Ann Arbor.
- M-39 starts in Lincoln Park's city center and runs along Southfield Road to Allen Park and becomes the Southfield Freeway, traveling through the west side of Detroit.
- M-53 begins at M-3 in Detroit, running through the city and connecting it to the Thumb area of the state. Locally known as Van Dyke Avenue.
- M-85, which is entirely in Wayne County, starts at Griswold Street in Downtown Detroit and connects the city's southwest side to Downriver, ending near Flat Rock at I-75, for whom which M-85 serves as an alternative. Locally known as West Fort and South Fort, divided at the River Rouge.
- M-97 only runs a short distance through Detroit's northeast side, starting at M-3. In the city it follows Gunston Street and Hoover Street.
- M-102 follows the county line between M-5 and I-94. Locally known as West 8 Mile and East 8 Mile, divided at John R. Street.
- M-153 starts at Wyoming Street on the Detroit-Dearborn limit and continues through the western suburbs as Ford Road.
- M-16 became part of US 16, which is also removed from Michigan.
- M-17 once followed Ecorse Road into Lincoln Park, then ran concurrently with U.S. Route 25 to Downtown Detroit.
- M-56 connected US 24 in Monroe to Flat Rock; it once connected to US 112 in Canton along Huron River Drive and Belleville Road.
- M-112 entered Wayne County during World War II, and the years following, on an expressway, providing access to the Willow Run Airport in Van Buren Township and turned onto present-day Interstate 94 in Romulus Township. In Taylor Township it had interchanges with both M-17 and US 24, then ended at US 112 in Dearborn.
- Dixie Highway ran through Wayne County as early as 1915. Back then it was one of the only routes that connected the county to the Southern United States. Today there are no traces of the old highway in the county.

=== Airports ===
- Detroit Metropolitan Wayne County Airport is located in the Downriver community of Romulus. It serves as a hub for Delta Air Lines and Spirit Airlines and is one of the two airports operated by the Wayne County Airport Authority.
- Willow Run Airport is located in Van Buren Township and has four runways (a fifth was recently converted into a taxiway). No scheduled flights operate out of Willow Run and is one of the two airports operated by the Wayne County Airport Authority.
- Grosse Ile Municipal Airport is located about two miles (3.2 km) south of Grosse Ile Township's downtown area. It has two paved runways. No scheduled flights operate out of this airport as well.
- Coleman A. Young International Airport is also known as the Detroit City Airport, which is not to be confused with the larger and nearby Detroit Metro Airport. It is located just a short drive from Downtown Detroit along M-3. It also has two runways and no scheduled flights, although it has been attempted in the past.

== Demographics ==
Historical population
Census	Pop.	Note	%±
1810	2,227		—
1820	3,574		60.5%
1830	6,781		89.7%
1840	24,173		256.5%
1850	42,756		76.9%
1860	75,547		76.7%
1870	119,068		57.6%
1880	168,444		41.5%
1890	257,114		52.6%
1900	348,793		35.7%
1910	531,591		52.4%
1920	1,177,645		121.5%
1930	1,888,946		60.4%
1940	2,015,623		6.7%
1950	2,435,235		20.8%
1960	2,666,297		9.5%
1970	2,666,751		0.0%
1980	2,337,843		−12.3%
1990	2,111,687		−9.7%
2000	2,061,162		−2.4%
2010	1,820,584		−11.7%
2020	1,793,561		−1.5%
2025 (est.)	1,769,038	▼	−1.4%
U.S. Decennial Census; 1790–1960 1900–1990; 1990–2000 2010–2019 2020 census

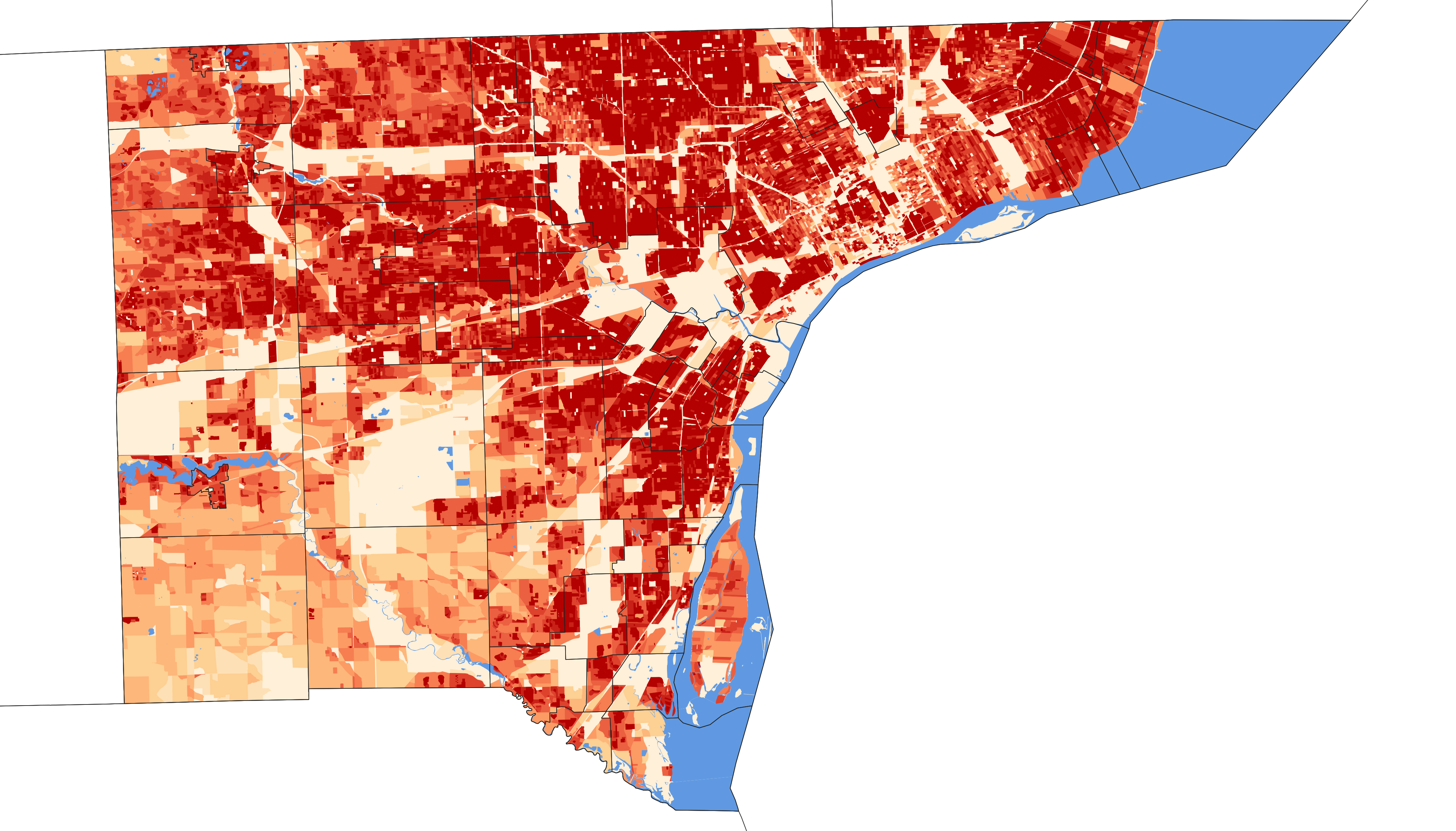
2020 population density of Wayne County MI by census block

=== 2020 census ===
As of the 2020 census, the county had a population of 1,793,561. The median age was 37.7 years. 23.3% of residents were under the age of 18 and 15.5% of residents were 65 years of age or older. For every 100 females there were 94.2 males, and for every 100 females age 18 and over there were 91.3 males.

The racial makeup of the county was 49.2% White, 37.6% Black or African American, 0.4% American Indian and Alaska Native, 3.6% Asian, <0.1% Native Hawaiian and Pacific Islander, 3.0% from some other race, and 6.2% from two or more races. Hispanic or Latino residents of any race comprised 6.6% of the population.

99.1% of residents lived in urban areas, while 0.9% lived in rural areas.

There were 709,400 households in the county, of which 30.0% had children under the age of 18 living in them. Of all households, 35.2% were married-couple households, 22.8% were households with a male householder and no spouse or partner present, and 35.2% were households with a female householder and no spouse or partner present. About 32.4% of all households were made up of individuals and 12.3% had someone living alone who was 65 years of age or older.

There were 790,191 housing units, of which 10.2% were vacant. Among occupied housing units, 61.6% were owner-occupied and 38.4% were renter-occupied. The homeowner vacancy rate was 1.5% and the rental vacancy rate was 8.6%.

=== Racial and ethnic composition ===
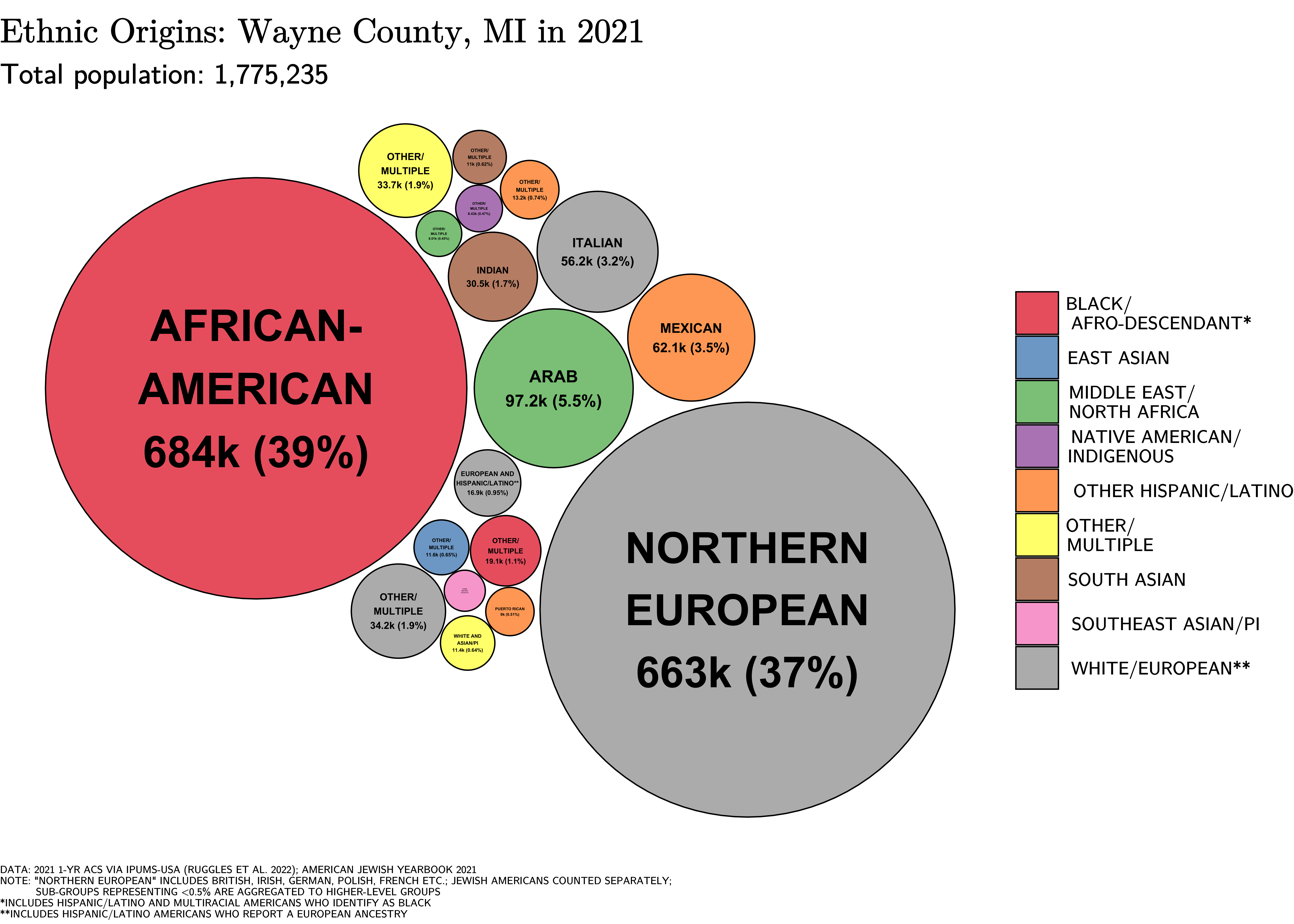
Ethnic origins in Wayne County

Wayne County, Michigan – Racial and ethnic composition Note: the US Census treats Hispanic/Latino as an ethnic category. This table excludes Latinos from the racial categories and assigns them to a separate category. Hispanics/Latinos may be of any race.
Race / Ethnicity (NH = Non-Hispanic)	Pop 1980	Pop 1990	Pop 2000	Pop 2010	Pop 2020	% 1980	% 1990	% 2000	% 2010	% 2020
White alone (NH)	1,433,148	1,185,576	1,028,984	902,180	857,132	61.30%	56.14%	49.92%	49.55%	47.79%
Black or African American alone (NH)	824,892	845,324	864,627	732,801	669,277	35.28%	40.03%	41.95%	40.25%	37.32%
Native American or Alaska Native alone (NH)	6,671	7,442	6,582	5,635	4,265	0.29%	0.35%	0.32%	0.31%	0.24%
Asian alone (NH)	15,177	21,046	34,837	45,590	64,604	0.65%	1.00%	1.69%	2.50%	3.60%
Native Hawaiian or Pacific Islander alone (NH)	x	x	398	304	322	x	x	0.02%	0.02%	0.02%
Other race alone (NH)	11,685	1,793	3,191	2,387	7,974	0.50%	0.08%	0.15%	0.13%	0.44%
Mixed race or Multiracial (NH)	x	x	45,336	36,427	72,338	x	x	2.20%	2.00%	4.03%
Hispanic or Latino (any race)	46,318	50,506	77,207	95,260	117,649	1.98%	2.39%	3.75%	5.23%	6.56%
Total	2,337,891	2,111,687	2,061,162	1,820,584	1,793,561	100.00%	100.00%	100.00%	100.00%	100.00%

=== 2010 census ===
The 2010 United States census indicates Wayne County had a 2010 population of 1,820,584. This is a decrease of 240,578 people from the 2000 United States census. Overall, the county had an -11.7% growth rate during this ten-year period. In 2010 there were 702,749 households and 450,651 families in the county. The population density was 2,974.4 per square mile (1,148.4 per square kilometer). There were 821,693 housing units at an average density of 1,342.5 per square mile (518.3 per square kilometer). 52.3% were White, 40.5% Black or African American, 2.5% Asian, 0.4% Native American, 0.8% of some other race and 2.4% of two or more races. 5.2% were Hispanic or Latino (of any race). 7.5% were of German, 6.8% Polish and 5.2% Irish ancestry.

There were 702,749 households, out of which 33.1% had children under the age of 18 living with them, 37.4% were husband and wife families, 20.7% had a female householder with no husband present, 35.9% were non-families, and 30.7% were made up of individuals. The average household size was 2.56 and the average family size was 3.22.

In the county, 25.4% of the population was under the age of 18, 9.7% was from 18 to 24, 25.5% from 25 to 44, 26.8% from 45 to 64, and 12.7% was 65 years of age or older. The median age was 37 years. For every 100 females, there were 92.4 males. For every 100 females age 18 and over, there were 88.7 males.

The 2010 American Community Survey 1-year estimate indicates the median income for a household in the county was $39,408 and the median income for a family was $49,176. Males had a median income of $26,823 versus $17,744 for females. The per capita income for the county was $20,948. About 18.6% of families and 23.7% of the population were below the poverty line, including 34.8% of those under the age 18 and 11.7% of that age 65 or over.

== Religion ==
According to 2010 statistics, the largest religious group in Wayne County was the Archdiocese of Detroit, with 297,283 Catholics worshipping at 149 parishes, followed by 92,394 non-denominational adherents with 144 congregations, 76,422 NBC Baptists with 110 congregations, an estimated 67,775 Muslims with 38 congregations, 28,021 ABCUSA Baptists with 32 congregations, 22,687 Missouri Synod Lutherans with 52 congregations, 16,043 CoGiC Pentecostals with 66 congregations, 14,689 UMC Methodists with 53 congregations, 14,107 PC-USA Presbyterians with 36 congregations, and 13,199 AME Methodists with 29 congregations. Altogether, 43.3% of the population was claimed as members by religious congregations, although members of historically African-American denominations were underrepresented due to incomplete information. In 2014, Wayne County had 780 religious organizations, the 12th most among all US counties.

== Government ==
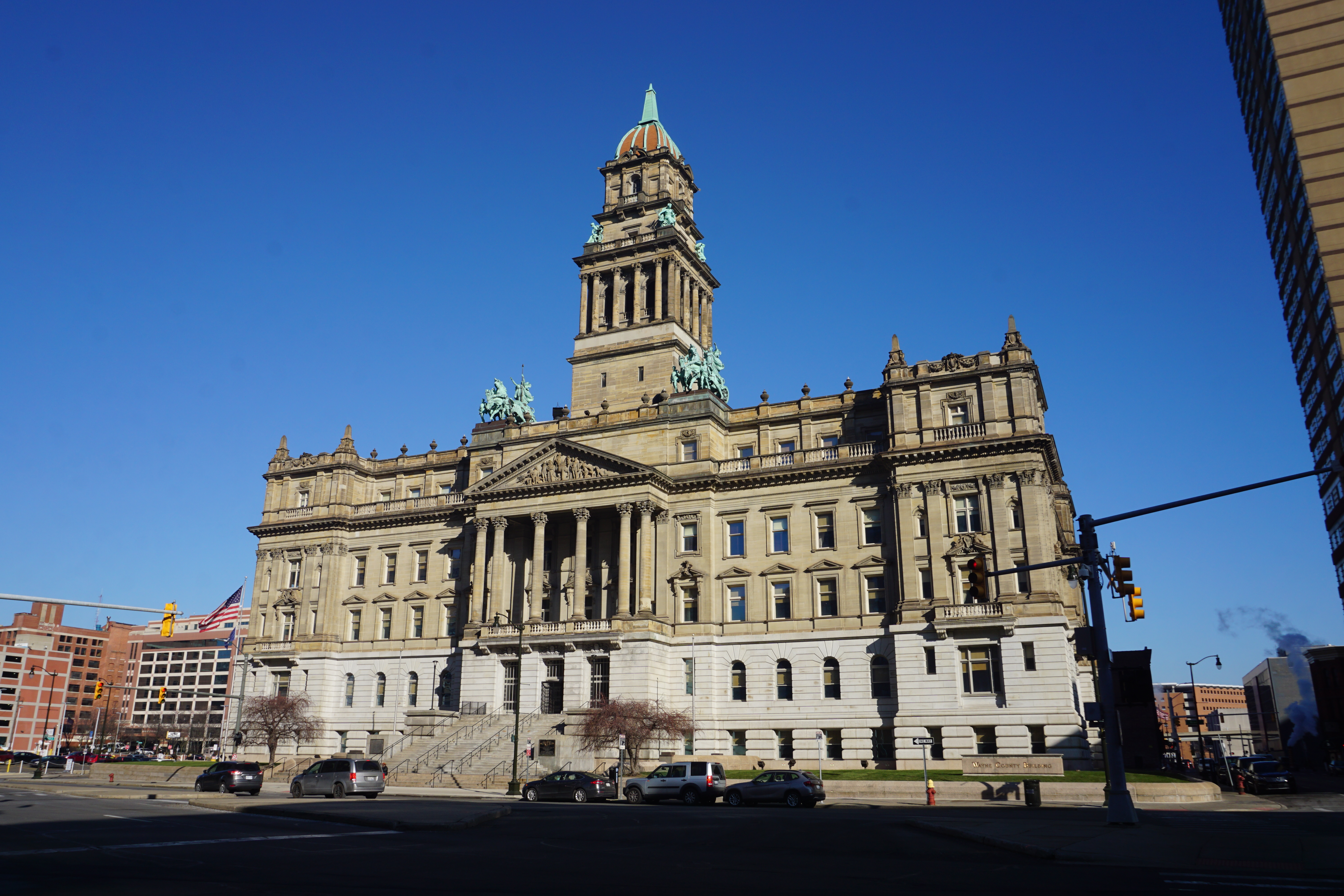
Wayne County Building

Wayne County is Michigan's first "charter county", with a home rule charter setting up its structures within limits set in state law and constitution. Most Michigan county governments are structured according to state law, without a locally adopted charter. The county is governed pursuant to the Home Rule Charter of Wayne County, Michigan, and the Wayne County Code is the codification of Wayne County's local ordinances. Unless a violation of the code or other ordinance is specifically designated as a municipal civil infraction (or unless expressly otherwise required by applicable state or federal laws), the violation is a misdemeanor.

The county government operates the jail, maintains rural roads, keeps files of deeds and mortgages, maintains vital records for all areas except Detroit, administers public health regulations, and participates with the state in the provision of welfare and other social services. Most other local government functions – police and fire, building and zoning, tax assessment, street maintenance, etc. – are the responsibility of individual cities and townships.

=== Elected officials ===
- County Executive: Warren Evans (Democratic)
- Prosecuting Attorney: Kym Worthy (Democratic)
- Sheriff: Raphael Washington (Democratic)
- County Clerk: Cathy M. Garrett (Democratic)
- County Treasurer: Eric Sabree (Democratic)
- Register of Deeds: Bernard J. Youngblood (Democratic)
- Wayne County Commission: Alisha Bell, Chair (Democratic) 15 members, elected from districts (14 Democrats, 1 Republican)
- Circuit Court (3rd Circuit encompasses Wayne County): 61 judges (non-partisan)
- Probate Court: 8 judges (non-partisan)

(information as of February 2021)

=== Department of Public Services ===
Formerly the Wayne County Road Commission, the Department of Public Services is the government agency in Wayne County responsible for building and maintaining the county's roads and highways. A number of the former agency's works are listed on the National Register of Historic Places.

=== Corrections ===
Wayne County operates the Adult Detention Facility and Juvenile Detention Facility, both located at the Wayne County Criminal Justice Center.

== Politics ==
Wayne County has backed the Democratic presidential nominee in every election since 1932, at times by large margins. From 1896 to 1928, it had always voted Republican for president, or at least more Republican than Democratic. Its large population has helped swing the election to Democrats in many statewide elections since then, with candidates running up large margins here offsetting Republican majorities in most rural counties of Michigan. In fact, between 1944 and 2012, the county had the largest margin of victory for the Democratic candidate in Michigan in every presidential election except for 1976 and 1984, both times coming in second place to Gogebic County in the Upper Peninsula by less than 1.5%.

More recently, however, the margin of victory for the Democrats has started to shrink. Beginning in 2016, neighboring Washtenaw County, home of the University of Michigan, has surpassed Wayne County as the most Democratic county in Michigan; and in 2024, Ingham County, home of Michigan State University, also voted more Democratic than Wayne County. In 2020, Donald Trump became the first Republican since 1988 to crack 30% of the vote in the county.

The 2024 election saw a bigger shift, with Trump taking slightly more than one-third of the county's vote, and Kamala Harris turning in the worst performance for a Democrat in Wayne County in 36 years, winning by less than 30% for the first time since 1988. The shift was due in part to many Arab American and American Muslim voters in Dearborn and Hamtramck voting for a third-party candidate (mostly for Green Party candidate Jill Stein), voting for Trump, or abstaining from the election, to protest the Biden Administration's handling of the Gaza War.

The last Republican candidate to carry Wayne County in a statewide election was Candice Miller when she won re-election to the Secretary of State office in 1998.

=== Federal representation ===
Wayne County is split between three congressional districts:

- 6th
- 12th
- 13th

United States presidential election results for Wayne County, Michigan
Year	Republican		Democratic		Third party(ies)	
Year	No.	%	No.	%	No.	%
1884	17,315	44.46%	20,930	53.74%	703	1.80%
1888	21,326	44.23%	25,986	53.90%	900	1.87%
1892	26,361	47.87%	27,508	49.95%	1,197	2.17%
1896	36,400	56.73%	26,231	40.89%	1,527	2.38%
1900	36,671	55.26%	28,337	42.70%	1,348	2.03%
1904	48,393	69.38%	19,548	28.03%	1,809	2.59%
1908	49,580	63.69%	24,128	31.00%	4,132	5.31%
1912	26,599	30.08%	22,678	25.65%	39,144	44.27%
1916	70,056	51.82%	60,935	45.08%	4,193	3.10%
1920	220,482	74.75%	51,773	17.55%	22,688	7.69%
1924	268,653	80.11%	23,817	7.10%	42,866	12.78%
1928	265,852	62.30%	157,047	36.80%	3,819	0.89%
1932	212,678	39.12%	310,686	57.15%	20,237	3.72%
1936	190,732	30.46%	404,055	64.53%	31,333	5.00%
1940	275,974	37.67%	451,003	61.56%	5,592	0.76%
1944	316,270	36.14%	554,670	63.38%	4,153	0.47%
1948	321,773	38.03%	489,654	57.87%	34,679	4.10%
1952	456,371	42.12%	622,236	57.43%	4,774	0.44%
1956	481,783	41.96%	664,618	57.88%	1,844	0.16%
1960	394,485	33.66%	773,327	65.99%	4,097	0.35%
1964	260,901	23.83%	831,674	75.97%	2,149	0.20%
1968	270,566	26.16%	654,157	63.25%	109,537	10.59%
1972	435,877	45.08%	514,913	53.26%	16,087	1.66%
1976	348,588	38.18%	548,767	60.11%	15,635	1.71%
1980	315,532	35.42%	522,024	58.60%	53,288	5.98%
1984	367,391	42.31%	496,632	57.19%	4,320	0.50%
1988	291,996	39.03%	450,222	60.18%	5,938	0.79%
1992	227,002	26.96%	508,464	60.39%	106,499	12.65%
1996	175,886	24.04%	504,466	68.95%	51,245	7.00%
2000	223,021	29.02%	530,414	69.01%	15,192	1.98%
2004	257,750	29.81%	600,047	69.39%	6,931	0.80%
2008	219,582	24.62%	660,085	74.02%	12,064	1.35%
2012	213,814	26.13%	595,846	72.83%	8,476	1.04%
2016	228,993	29.26%	519,444	66.36%	34,282	4.38%
2020	264,553	30.27%	597,170	68.32%	12,295	1.41%
2024	288,860	33.72%	537,032	62.69%	30,798	3.59%

United States Senate election results for Wayne County, Michigan1
Year	Republican		Democratic		Third party(ies)	
Year	No.	%	No.	%	No.	%
2024	267,761	31.92%	532,029	63.42%	39,069	4.66%

Michigan Gubernatorial election results for Wayne County
Year	Republican		Democratic		Third party(ies)	
Year	No.	%	No.	%	No.	%
2022	180,487	27.95%	457,601	70.86%	7,651	1.18%

== Communities ==
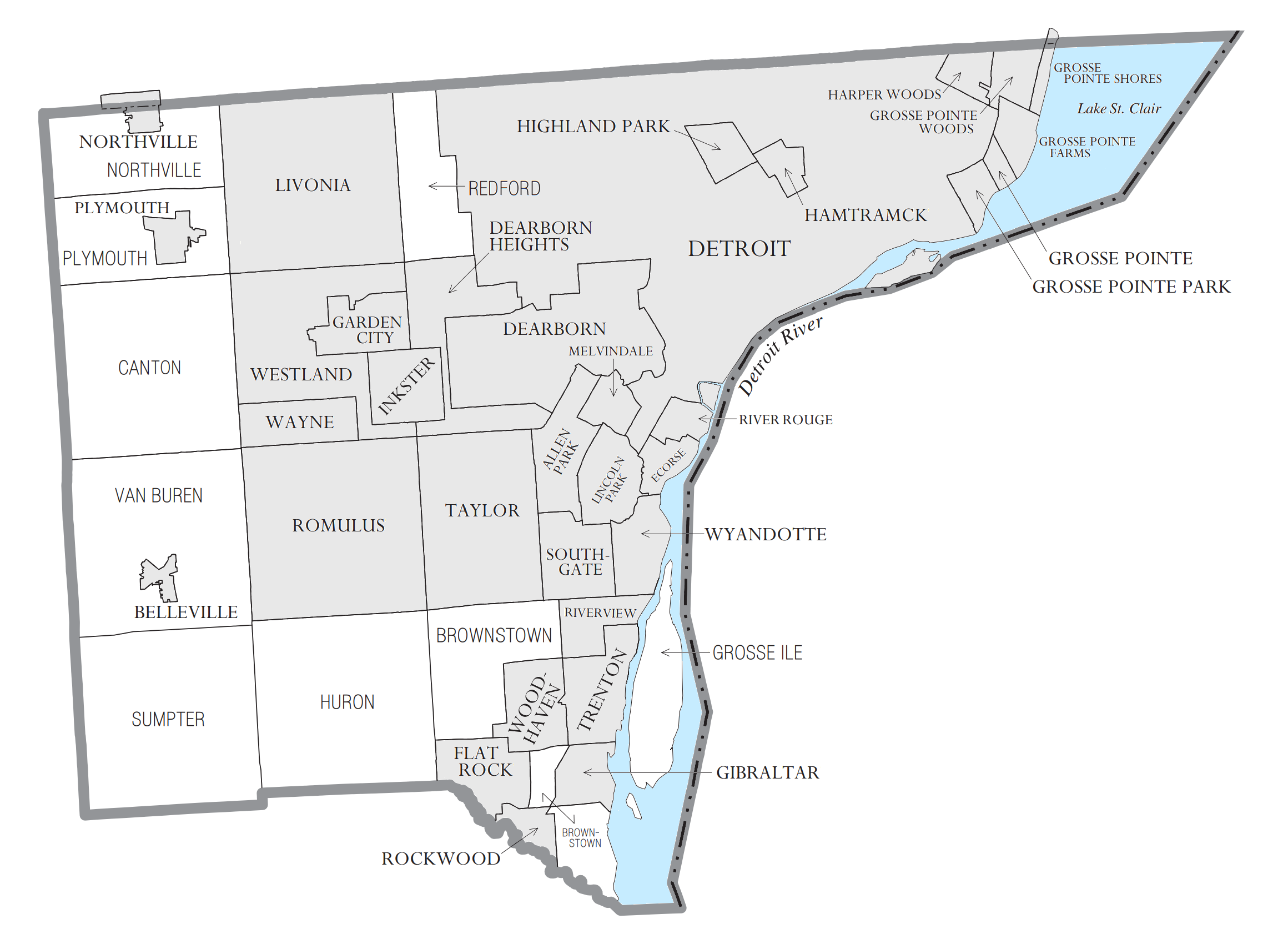
U.S. census data map showing local municipal boundaries within Wayne County. Shaded areas represent incorporated cities.

=== Cities ===
- Allen Park
- Belleville
- Dearborn
- Dearborn Heights
- Detroit (county seat)
- Ecorse
- Flat Rock (partially in Monroe County)
- Garden City
- Gibraltar
- Grosse Pointe
- Grosse Pointe Farms
- Grosse Pointe Park
- Grosse Pointe Shores (partially in Macomb County)
- Grosse Pointe Woods
- Hamtramck
- Harper Woods
- Highland Park
- Inkster
- Lincoln Park
- Livonia
- Melvindale
- Northville (partially in Oakland County)
- Plymouth
- River Rouge
- Riverview
- Rockwood
- Romulus
- Southgate
- Taylor
- Trenton
- Wayne
- Westland
- Woodhaven
- Wyandotte

=== Charter townships ===
- Brownstown Charter Township
- Canton Charter Township
- Huron Charter Township
- Northville Charter Township
- Plymouth Charter Township
- Redford Charter Township
- Van Buren Charter Township

=== Civil townships ===
- Grosse Ile Township
- Sumpter Township

=== Unincorporated communities ===
- Beech
- Belleville North
- Cherry Hill
- Cherry Island
- Conners Creek (former)
- Denton
- Duboisville (former)
- East Rockwood
- Edgewater Heights
- French Landing
- Grand View Acres
- Maple Beach
- Martinsville
- Milleville Beach
- New Boston
- Rawsonville (partially in Washtenaw County)
- Roulo
- Sheldon
- Waltz
- West Sumpter
- Willow

== Education ==
School districts:

- Airport Community Schools
- Allen Park Public Schools
- Crestwood School District
- Clarenceville School District
- Dearborn Public Schools
- Dearborn Heights School District 7
- Detroit Public Schools Community District
- Ecorse Public Schools
- Flat Rock Community Schools
- Garden City Public Schools
- Gibraltar School District
- Grosse Ile Township Schools
- Grosse Pointe Public School System
- Hamtramck Public Schools
- Harper Woods School District
- Highland Park Schools
- Huron School District
- Lincoln Consolidated School District
- Lincoln Park Public Schools
- Livonia Public Schools
- Melvindale–Northern Allen Park Public Schools
- Northville Public Schools
- Plymouth-Canton Community Schools
- Redford Union Schools
- River Rouge School District
- Riverview Community School District
- Romulus Community School District
- South Redford School District
- Southgate Community School District
- Taylor School District
- Trenton Public Schools
- Van Buren Public Schools
- Wayne-Westland Community Schools
- Westwood Community Schools
- Woodhaven-Brownstown School District
- Wyandotte Public Schools

Former school districts:

- Inkster Public Schools

Tertiary institutions:

- Henry Ford College
- Schoolcraft College
- University of Detroit Mercy
- Wayne State University

== See also ==
- List of Michigan State Historic Sites in Wayne County
- National Register of Historic Places listings in Wayne County, Michigan
- Saginaw Trail
- Sauk Trail
- Woodward Corridor
- Downriver
