= Waltz, Michigan =

- Unincorporated community
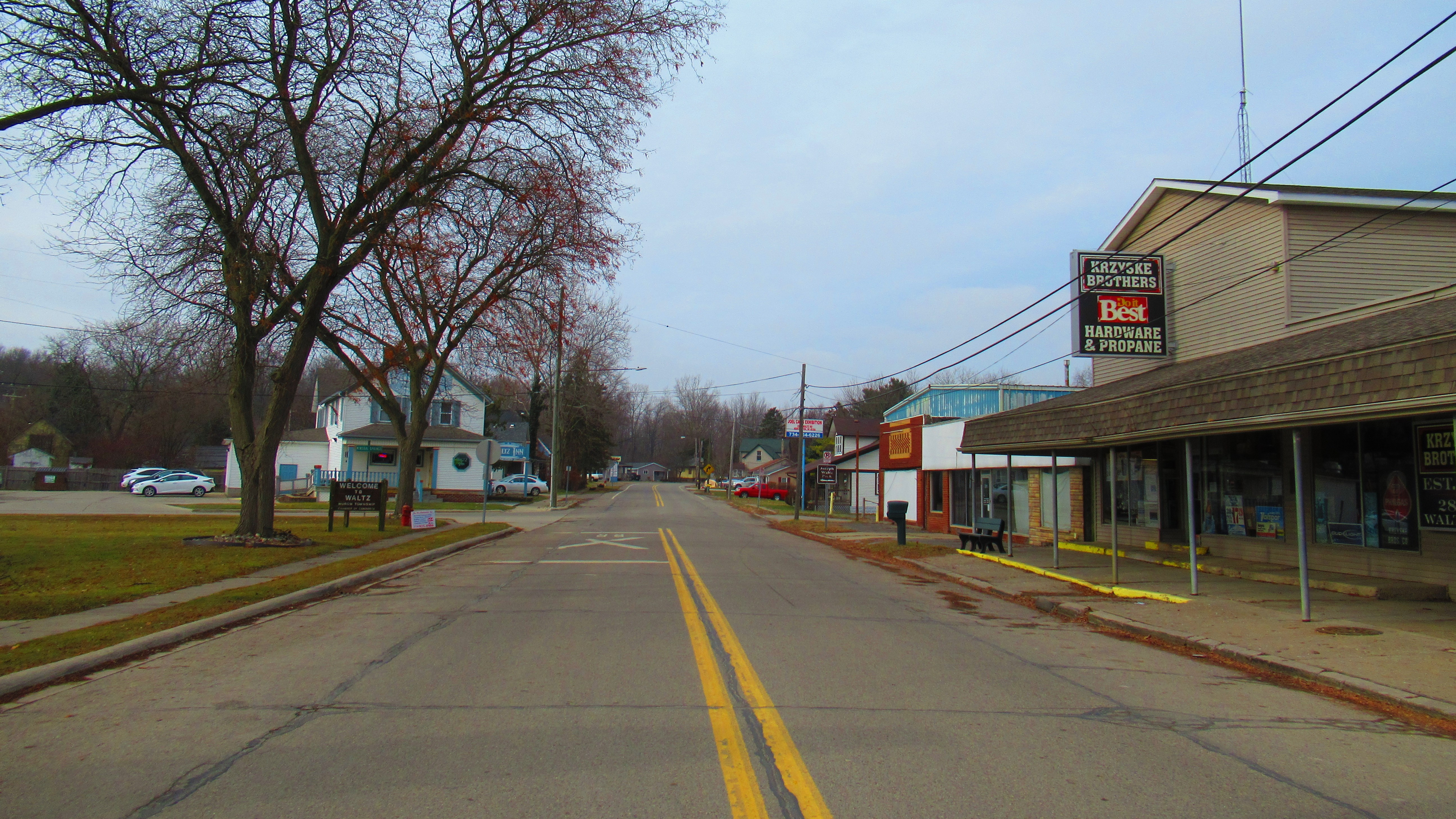
- Looking northwest along Waltz Road

- Location within the state of Michigan Location within the United States
- Coordinates: 42°06′01″N 83°23′32″W
- Country: United States
- State: Michigan
- County: Wayne
- Township: Huron
- Settled: 1857
- Elevation: 620 ft (189 m)
- Time zone: UTC-5 (Eastern (EST))
  - Summer (DST): UTC-4 (EDT)
- ZIP code(s): 48164 (New Boston)
- Area code: 734
- GNIS feature ID: 1615752

Waltz is an unincorporated community in Wayne County in the U.S. state of Michigan. It is located within Huron Charter Township approximately 25 miles (40 km) southwest of Detroit. As an unincorporated community, Waltz has no defined boundaries or population statistics of its own.

The community was first settled in 1857 when Joseph Waltz, Sr., moved his family from Detroit to a 160-acre (65 ha) plot of farmland. The original farm was located along Territorial Road (now Waltz Road) just north of the Wayne–Monroe county line. When the elder Waltz died in 1865, the property was left to his widow Mary, who later deeded it to Joseph Waltz, Jr., in 1867. In 1872, the area of Waltz was platted. The community later expanded through several additions. Joseph Waltz, Jr., operated a general store on Territorial Road which later became Krzyske Brothers Hardware which remains in operation today. Waltz also opened a German bier garten and hall on Mineral Springs Avenue and Territorial Road, this business remains in operation today as the Waltz Inn. Joseph Waltz, Jr. held many political positions including Huron Township Clerk and Supervisor, Superintendent of the poor for Wayne County and also State Representative. As Superintendent of the Poor, he was instrumental in establishing the Wayne County Hospital at Eloise and as State Representative, he was largely responsible in purchasing Detroit's Belle Isle Park.

The community is located along the Flint and Pere Marquette Railroad where it had its own depot and was a primary producer of charcoal and bricks. Other businesses in Waltz's early history included the Waltz Hotel, Waltz Cheese and Molasses Company, and the Harbaurer Pickle Company.

Although early in its existence, Waltz supported two churches, the primary center of spiritual and religious learning has been St. John's Lutheran Church which was founded in the community in 1857.

The community continues to exist today located off Michigan's Interstate 275 at exit 8. The community is served by the Huron School District. Postal service from the Waltz Post Office ceased in 1954 when a new post office was opened in New Boston using the 48164 ZIP Code. The community of Willow is just to the north.
