= Crestwood School District (Michigan) =

School district in Michigan

Address
- 1045 N. Gulley Road Dearborn Heights, Wayne, Michigan, 48127; United States

District information
- Type: Public
- Grades: PreK–12
- Superintendent: Dr. Youssef Mosallam
- Budget: $76,179,000 2022-2023 expenditures
- NCES District ID: 2600016

Students and staff
- Students: 3,688 (2024-2025)
- Teachers: 226.46 (on an FTE basis) (2024-2025)
- Staff: 466.63 FTE (2024-2025)
- Student–teacher ratio: 16.29 (2024-2025)

Other information
- Website: www.csdm.k12.mi.us

Crestwood School District is a school district in Dearborn Heights, Michigan, serving the northwest portions of the city.

By 2016 the Arab American student population was increasing due to an influx of Arabs into Dearborn Heights.

== History ==
The district was formed in 1964 from Dearborn Township School District No. 4. Crestwood High School opened during the 1965-1966 school year. At the end of that school year, teachers in the district went on strike, cancelling classes for four days. The dispute was resolved in August of 1966 when teachers agreed to a no-strike pact.

During the 1974-1975 school year, Crestwood School District was involved in another labor dispute with its teachers' union. After their contract expired in August 1971, the district and teachers union could not agree to a new contract due to salary disputes. Teachers went on strike in fall 1974, and on October 22 a court ordered them back to work. They struck again on December 4. That month, police closed the high school due to a bomb threat and failed fire alarm system.

Throughout the district, 180 teachers were fired for disobeying a return-to-work order. On January 6, 1975, classes resumed after 40 cancelled days as replacement teachers attempted to cross the picket line of 300 protesters at Crestwood High School. Fifteen protesters were arrested for blocking the driveway or disorderly conduct, but there was no violence. A court ruled the firings illegal several days later.

The district appealed the rehiring of its fired teachers. At the beginning of the 1975-1976 school year, 160 of the teachers were still seeking reinstatement. In September 1977, Wayne County Circuit Court ruled that of the teachers still contesting their firings, 127 were justly fired and 12 had been illegally fired and were ordered reinstatement with back pay.

In 2013 the Equal Employment Opportunity Commission ruled that the district had discriminated against Arab Americans and other minority groups while determining which people should be added as staff members, which made it out of compliance with the Civil Rights Act.

== Schools ==
List of schools in Crestwood School District
School	Address	Notes
Crestwood High School	1501 N. Beech Daly Rd., Dearborn Heights	Grades 9–12
Riverside Middle School	25900 W. Warren, Dearborn Heights	Grades 5–8
Highview Elementary School	25225 Richardson St., Dearborn Heights	Grades K–4
Hillcrest Elementary School	7500 Vernon St., Dearborn Heights	Grades K–4
Kinloch Elementary School	1505 Kinloch, Dearborn Heights	Grades K–4
Crestwood Early Childhood Center	1045 N. Gulley Rd., Dearborn Heights	Preschool
