= Westwood Community School District (Michigan) =

School district in Michigan

Address
- 3335 South Beech Daly Road Dearborn Heights, Wayne County, Michigan, 48125; United States

District information
- Grades: Pre-Kindergarten-12
- Superintendent: Dr. Stiles Simmons
- Schools: 6
- Budget: $37,041,000 2022-2023 expenditures
- NCES District ID: 2611640

Students and staff
- Students: 1,513 (2024-2025)
- Teachers: 95.63 (on an FTE basis) (2024-2025)
- Staff: 215.18 FTE (2024-2025)
- Student–teacher ratio: 15.82 (2024-2025)

Other information
- Website: www.westwoodschools.net

Westwood Community School District is a public school district in Metro Detroit. It serves portions of Dearborn Heights, Inkster and Dearborn; the sections of Dearborn within the district are zoned for industrial and commercial uses.

== History ==
Westwood Community School District was known as Dearborn Township District No. 8 until about 1969.

Prior to the opening of Robichaud High School, junior and senior high school students attended Roosevelt High School. The district's new high school was named for Hamilton J. Robichaud, the district's superintendent at the time.

Robichaud High School was completed in 1960, but the district was in a financial crisis and lacked the funds to open it. Voters had approved funds to build the school but then denied the funds needed to operate it three times. The district was on half-day sessions due to overcrowding and a lack of revenue to pay teachers. In February 1961, parts of the high school began to be used to relieve overcrowding in the district but the building was not used fully as the high school until fall 1961.

The district has endured challenges of racial violence. Brief closures of Robichaud High School occurred in 1967, 1968, and 1972 due to racial fighting.

In summer 2013, the Inkster Public Schools District was entirely dissolved and Westwood school district absorbed some of its boundary. Students north of Michigan Avenue and east of Middlebelt were rezoned to Westwood.

Voters approved a $24.5 million bond issue in 2023 to improve district facilities.

== Schools ==
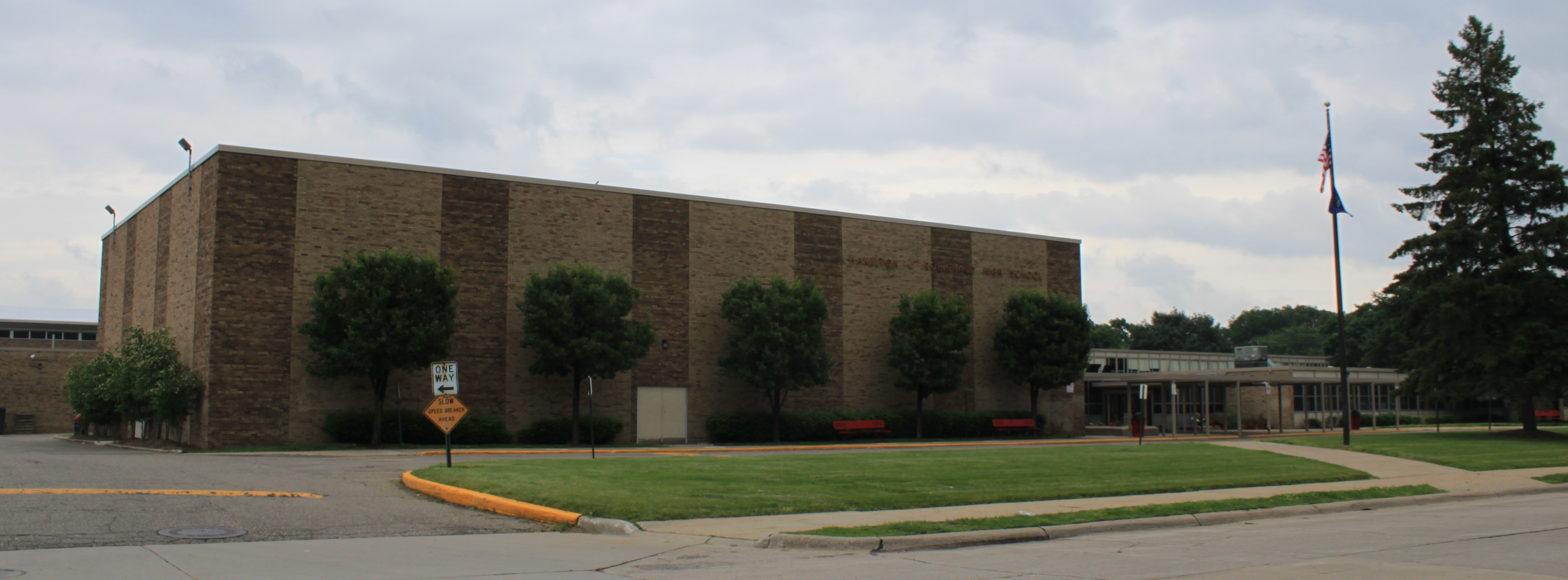
Robichaud High School

Schools in Westwood Community School District
School	Address	Notes
Hamilton Robichaud High School	3601 Janet, Dearborn Heights	Grades 9-12. Built 1960.
Tomlinson Middle School	25912 Annapolis, Inkster	Grades 7-8. Formerly Tomlinson Elementary School
Daly Elementary School	25824 Michigan Avenue, Inkster	Grades PreK-6
Thorne Elementary School	25251 Annapolis, Dearborn Heights	Grades PreK-6
Westwood North Academy	25824 Michigan Avenue, Inkster	Alternative high school. Grades 9-12. Shares building with Daly Elementary and Westwood Virtual Academy, an online school.

Former schools

- McNair Elementary School (Inkster) - this school has been razed.
- MoKersky Elementary School (Inkster) - formerly the Bethlehem Temple of Inkster Christian Academy, this school is now for sale
- Roosevelt Elementary School (Dearborn Heights) - this school has been razed
- Westwood Elementary School (Inkster) - this school has been razed
