= Direct Air =

American virtual airline

IATA	ICAO	Call sign
D1	—	—
- Founded: 2006; 20 years ago (as Myrtle Beach Direct Air)
- Ceased operations: 13 March 2012; 14 years ago
- AOC #: Various
- Hubs: Myrtle Beach
- Focus cities: Punta Gorda; Tampa/Lakeland
- Destinations: 18
- Parent company: Sky Air & Tours LLC
- Headquarters: Myrtle Beach, South Carolina
- Key people: Ed Warneck; Judy Tull; Marshall Ellison; Kay Ellison; Robert Keilmann

Southern Sky Air Tours, d/b/a Direct Air was a virtual airline based in Myrtle Beach, South Carolina, United States. Direct Air started in 2007 and leased aircraft with charter airlines. Its main base was Myrtle Beach International Airport. Direct Air's flights were operated by Sky King, Inc., Xtra Airways, World Atlantic Airlines, and USA Jet. In March 2012 Direct Air ceased operations, stranding many of its passengers. The airline planned to resume operations on May 15, 2012, although this was contested by the U.S. Department of Transportation. The charter carrier was subject to Chapter 7 liquidation on April 12, 2012.

== History ==
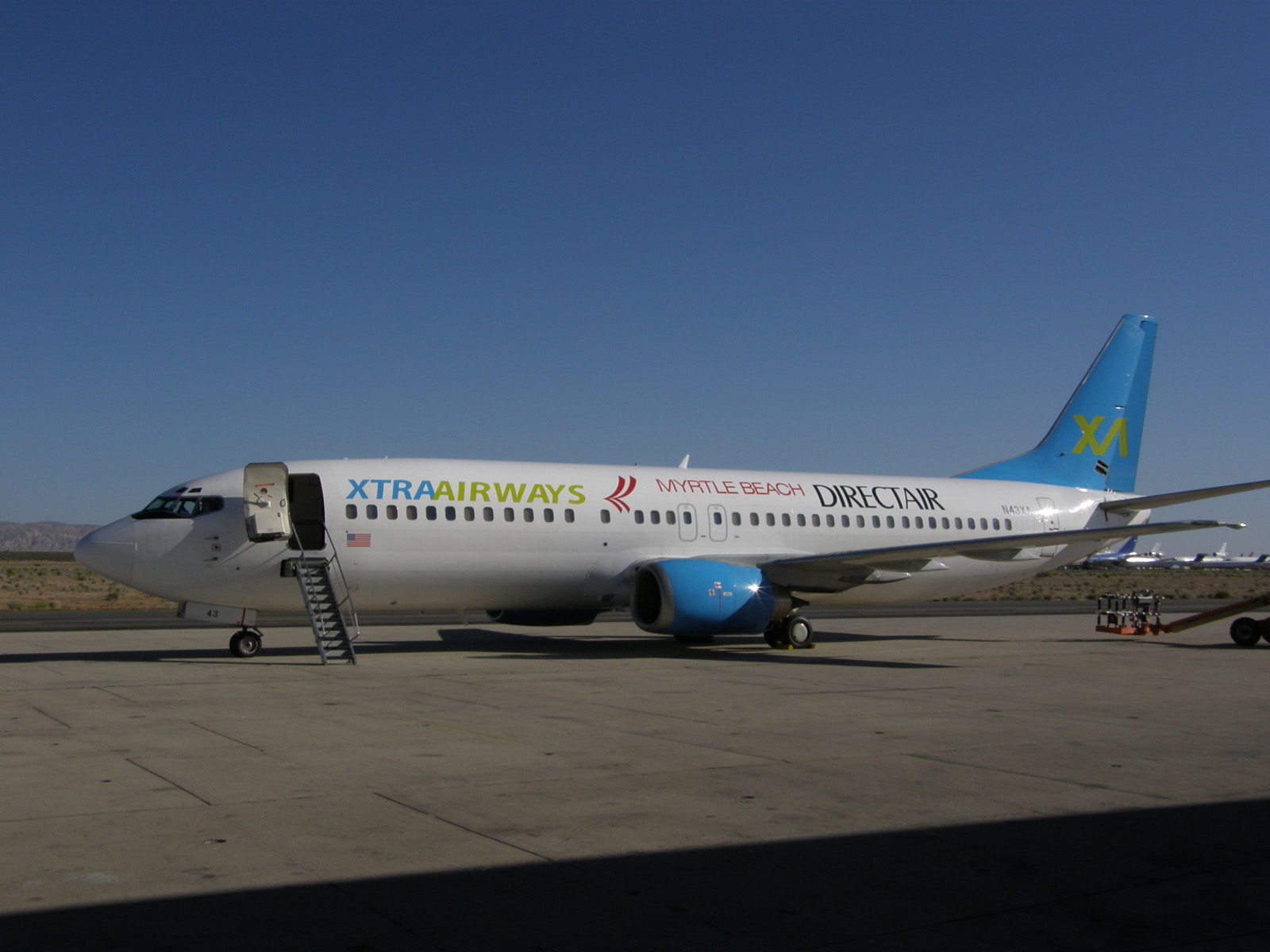
Xtra Airways Boeing 737-400 with Myrtle Beach Direct Air titles

On November 14, 2006, Direct Air announced nonstop service from Myrtle Beach to Newark, Niagara Falls, and Plattsburgh, New York. On March 7, 2007, Direct Air (Myrtle Beach Direct Air at the time) started flying. The flights were being operated by Sky King, Inc. on Boeing 737-200 aircraft until May 14, 2007, when Direct Air ended its relationship with Sky King, Inc.

Direct Air's flights were then operated primarily by Xtra Airways and Sky King, Inc. Boeing 737-400 aircraft. Occasionally, especially during peak travel periods, additional other operating carriers and aircraft types are used. These have included jetBlue Airways, Sun Country Airlines, Virgin America, USA Jet, Dynamic Airways, Vision Airlines, and Miami Air.

On March 12, 2012, Direct Air cancelled all of their charter flights throughout the United States. Passengers were initially not given reasons for the abrupt cancellations. On March 13, 2012, a statement issued by Marketing Manager, Ed Warnek, indicated that flights would resume on Wednesday, March 14. Flight cancellations were attributed to a missed fuel payment. Further news releases on March 13 indicate that flights will not resume until May 15 at the earliest. On March 15, the U.S. Department of Transportation issued a statement indicating that "The company has announced that it intends to restart operations as of May 15, 2012; however, the company currently does not have authority to do so."

On March 16, 2012, Direct Air issued a press release stating that it filed for Chapter 11 bankruptcy protection. The public address on its home page was also modified to remove any indication that they would resume operation on May 15, 2012. Chapter 7 liquidation commenced on April 12, 2012.

On August 21, 2012, it was announced that Direct Air had racked up $9.6 million in federal rules violations during the spring when Direct Air abruptly canceled about 350 flights according to its fillings in bankruptcy court. Between March 15 and March 24 Direct Air canceled 144 flights and another 206 flights between March 25 and April 11 that violated federal rules that are aimed at protecting passengers according to a filing made by the U.S. Department of Transportation, who regulates charter operators such as Direct Air and tallied the civil penalties Direct Air according to federal rules isn't allowed to cancel flights less than 10 days before the scheduled departure unless it is physically impossible to fly as is what Direct Air did through March 24, according to the DOT. Direct Air should have also notified passengers that were scheduled to fly on 206 flights March 25 through April 11, when Direct Air's initial chapter 11 bankruptcy case was converted to Chapter 7 liquidation, that their flights had been canceled. Federal rules require that charter operators notify each passenger in writing within seven days after the cancellation but not less than 10 days before the scheduled flight. "No circumstances of physical impossibility existed during that 10-day period that would have prevented [Direct Air] from performing the scheduled flights," the DOT said in its administrative claim to the fines accumulated prior to the case's conversion to Chapter 7. The civil penalty of $9,625,000 could be adjusted to a higher penalty after the DOT received flight information from Sky King, one of five carriers that flew flights for Direct Air, according to the court filing. The DOT is also looking into Direct Air's handling of a required escrow account that officials say is underfunded, which is also another violation of federal law. The maximum civil penalty is $27,500 per violation per day, but the total in Direct Air's case is still unknown, according to the DOT's court filings.

On September 29, 2012, The Sun News wrote an article titled "Direct Air woes spread" and in the article that said that Sky King, Inc. which is a Lakeland, Florida based company who provided planes, pilots and crews to Direct Air, had filed Chapter 11 bankruptcy reorganization. The company's president blamed Direct Air for the Chapter 11 bankruptcy filing and in that filing says that Direct Air owed Sky King $1 million all this according to a report in the Lakeland Ledger. Sky King President Frank Visconti told the Lakeland Ledger that Direct Air owed then a significant amount of money when they the fuel company cut Sky King off. Sky King was one of eight carriers that flew Direct Air's routes for them. One of the other carriers who flew Direct Airs routes, World Atlantic Airlines, was fined by the United States Department of Transportation $180,000 in July because it abruptly cancelled flights without the proper notice to passengers as the USDOT requires. The USDOT had said that is continuing to investigate Direct Air as well as its carriers. The bankruptcy court is currently sorting through Direct Air's financial records. Investigators have already determined that there wasn't as much money in escrow accounts as there should have been or that was thought to be in the account, but they are still sorting through all the details.

On October 2, 2012, it was announced Tuesday that a second carrier of the now defunct Direct Air was fined for abruptly canceling flights in March that left hundreds of vacationers and other travelers stranded. Xtra Airways was fined $300,000 by the U.S. Department of Transportation because Xtra Airways cancelled flights less than 10 days before departure and for not ensuring a return flight for round-trip passengers as required by the DOT of such public charter flights. Xtra also violated rules that required them to be paid before operating public charted flights. Xtra stopped flying charters for Direct Air on March 13 when Direct Air failed to pay the carrier all the money it was owed for operating flights that departed on or after March 3, according to the U.S. Department of Transportation. Xtra also had received late payments from Direct Air for several flights prior to March 3, that should have prompted Xtra to look and see whether Direct Air was following the federal rules, said a DOT Aviation Enforcement Office. The DOT also requires carriers to make a reasonable effort to ensure that the charter operators they fly for are obeying the federal rules. Xtra is the second of Direct Air's eight carriers to be fined by the DOT, with the first one being World Atlantic Airlines which was fined $180,000 in late July. Another one of Direct Air carriers Florida-based Sky King, has filed for Chapter 11 bankruptcy reorganization, with the company's president telling Lakeland Ledger the bankruptcy filling was led by Direct Air's demise, as Sky King was owed $1 million by the former carrier. The trustee that is in charge of the Direct Air case told WMBF News a local news station in Myrtle Beach said that there could even be criminal charges filed in relation to the investigation into Direct Air's bankruptcy

On May 19, 2014, it was reported that the trustee in Direct Air's bankruptcy case has agreed to drop a racketeering lawsuit against Direct Air's former chief executive officer in exchange for a $10,000 payment or about 1.5 percent of the total amount that she owes, according to court documents. The trustee, Joseph Baldiga, says that he doubts that he will be able to collect the $657,252 that Judy Tull, Direct Air's former chief executive officer, owes to the bankruptcy estate, so instead of trying to collect the full amount the trustee as proposed the $10,000 settlement, which still needs to be approved by a bankruptcy judge, but no court date had been set. Baldiga is still suing the other Direct Air founders including Marshall and Kay Ellison, Robert Keilmann and Ed Warneck in order to recover nearly $2.6 million in payments that the founders received from the carrier before it abruptly stopped flying and filed for bankruptcy protection in March 2012. The trustee has also filed a racketeering complaint against Kay Ellison in which he claims that both Ellison and Tull fraudulently withdrew money from an escrow account that was supposed to help protect passengers’ fares in the event their flights did not occur. According to court documents the trustee said that the $10,000 payment from Tull is about the best the carrier's estate can expect.

== Post-bankruptcy criminal proceedings ==
Two of the five original principal Direct Air partners—Kay Ellison and Judy Tull—were indicted in the United States Court for the District of New Jersey on January 17, 2016, on multiple counts of bank fraud, wire fraud and conspiracy in connection with Direct Air's demise. A third partner, Robert Keilman, had previously pleaded guilty in September 2015 to one federal count of conspiracy in exchange for cooperation with prosecutors. Keilman, aged 72 as of 2018, faces up to five years in prison and a $250,000 fine when he is scheduled for sentencing in July, 2018 (the two remaining partners, S. Marshall Ellison—spouse of Kay Ellison—and Edward Warneck were not charged with criminal offenses as of 2018).

The government's case alleged that these three partners conspired to defraud Valley National Bank of New Jersey of ticketholder funds deposited into a Public Charter escrow account established for the purposes of consumer protection as mandated by United States Department of Transportation guidelines governing Public Charter air services, and as laid forth in the Public Charter Operator-Participant Contract. Upon examination it was alleged that this account which should have contained approximately US$30 million at the time of Direct Air's cessation of operations in March 2012 then contained only an approximate $1 million.

Kay Ellison and Judy Tull maintained their innocence and mounted a defense. After lengthy procedural delays, their case went to trial before Judge Susan D. Wigendon of the United States Court of the District of New Jersey on March 22, 2018, in Newark. After a seven-day trial, a jury returned a verdict of guilty for Ellison and Tull for all indicted counts: each defendant was convicted of four substantive counts of bank fraud, three counts of wire fraud and one count of conspiracy. Ellison, now 57 as of 2018 and Tull, now 72, each face up to 450 years in prison and US$15 million in fines when they are scheduled for sentencing in July 2018 along with Keilman.

According to the US Department of Justice's official statement post-trial, defendants Ellison and Tull:

"...stole passengers' money to try and prop up their failing company,” said Acting Assistant Attorney General (John P.) Cronan. “Their brazen scheme created a multimillion dollar shortfall that left passengers stranded at airports, and banks and credit card companies scrambling to pick up the pieces."

and:

"According to evidence presented at trial, from October 2007 through March 2012, Tull and Ellison engaged in a scheme to steal passengers’ money for future travel from an escrow account by artificially inflating the amount of money the defendants claimed they were entitled to receive, and by sending this falsified amount in a letter to the escrow bank telling the escrow bank to release the money. The evidence further established that to cover up their fraud, the defendants falsified profit and loss statements to make the company look like it was making money rather than losing money, and sent these falsified documents to credit card companies and banks to trick them into continuing to do business with the company."

On November 28, 2018, Kay Ellison was sentenced in New Jersey to 94 months in prison and has been ordered her to pay $19.6 million in restitution. DirectAir CEO Judy Tull was later also sentenced to 94 months while chief financial officer Robert Keilman was sentenced to 60 months in federal prison.

== Areas of operation ==
Direct Air opened a secondary hub in St. Petersburg, FL, but closed the station in 2008.

In winter 2009 they started flying from Melbourne, FL to Niagara Falls and Punta Gorda. In the 2010-2011 winter season they began operating flights from Palm Beach International Airport to several of their northern origin airports, including Worcester, Kalamazoo, and Rockford. In 2011 they became the first airline to offer commercial air service from Florida's Lakeland Linder International Airport since the 1970s.

== Former destinations ==
=== United States ===
Florida

- Lakeland (Lakeland Linder International Airport)
- Orlando (Orlando Sanford International Airport)
- Fort Myers/Punta Gorda (Charlotte County Airport) Focus City
- West Palm Beach (Palm Beach International Airport) Focus City

Illinois

- Rockford (Chicago Rockford International Airport)
- Springfield, Illinois (Abraham Lincoln Capital Airport)

Massachusetts

- Worcester (Worcester Regional Airport)

Michigan

- Kalamazoo (Kalamazoo/Battle Creek International Airport)

New Jersey

- Newark (Newark Liberty International Airport) [seasonal]

New York

- Niagara Falls (Niagara Falls International Airport)
- Plattsburgh (Plattsburgh International Airport)

Ohio

- Columbus (Rickenbacker International Airport) [seasonal]
- Toledo (Toledo Express Airport)

Pennsylvania

- Allentown (Lehigh Valley International Airport)
- Pittsburgh (Pittsburgh International Airport)

South Carolina

- Myrtle Beach (Myrtle Beach International Airport) Hub

=== Former Destinations (prior to liquidation) ===
- Hagerstown, Maryland (Hagerstown Regional Airport)
- St. Petersburg-Clearwater (St. Petersburg-Clearwater International Airport) — Former focus city; closed in June 2008.
- Washington, D.C. (Dulles International Airport) — Sales suspended indefinitely due to low demand. Service was scheduled to begin on February 4, 2010.

== Fleet ==
As Direct Air was a business classed as a virtual airline (economics), it had no true aircraft fleet upon its own FAA / DOT operating certificate. Instead, the Direct Air business model used the services of the following airlines aircraft (as of March 14, 2010):

Direct Air fleet
Aircraft	Total	Passengers	Notes
Boeing 737-400	2	150	both owned and operated by Xtra Airways
Boeing 737-400	1	144	leased and operated by Sky King, Inc.
McDonnell Douglas MD-83	2	155	both owned and operated by World Atlantic Airlines

== Incidents ==
On August 5, 2011, a Direct Air flight operated by Dynamic Airways from Lakeland Linder International Airport to Abraham Lincoln Capital Airport in Illinois lost an engine over the Gulf of Mexico and flew back to Tampa International Airport. Passengers were told another plane was on its way, but one never arrived. Passengers were bussed back to Lakeland. October 15, 2011: Direct Air flight from Lakeland Linder International Airport to Niagara Falls International Airport operated by Sky King, Inc. lost cabin pressure approximately one hour into the flight. Oxygen masks on board failed to deploy, and several passengers passed out, complained of chest pains, shortness of breath, or other issues related to the loss of pressure. The flight returned to Lakeland. After landing in Lakeland, mechanics attempted to fix the plane, and it took off again approximately 5 hours later. The second flight experienced the same air pressurization issues 20 minutes into the flight, again causing passengers to pass out as oxygen masks again failed to deploy. The flight returned, again, to Lakeland. There were no deaths, but at least one person was hospitalized with shortness of breath. Eventually, another plane was chartered to make the flight to Niagara Falls.

== See also ==
- List of defunct airlines of the United States
