= Songbird Airways =

Airline of the United States

IATA	ICAO	Call sign
6K	SGB	SONGBIRD
- Founded: July 1990; 34 years ago (as Sky King)
- Commenced operations: June 2015; 9 years ago (as Songbird Airways)
- Ceased operations: February 7, 2017; 8 years ago
- Hubs: Miami International Airport
- Parent company: AerLine Holdings Inc.
- Headquarters: Miami, Florida
- Key people: Frank Visconti (President & CEO); Doug McGowan (Director of Operations); Naresh Maharaj (Chief Pilot); Mark Berry (Director of Maintenance); Bill Pletzke (Director of Safety); Emory White (Director of Quality)
- Employees: 270 (2010)
- Website: songbirdairways.com

Songbird Airways, Inc., established as Sky King, was a charter airline based in Miami, Florida. As Sky King, it operated flights from Florida to Cuba on behalf of Customer Service Providers (CSPs). Sky King also conducted flights of deportees to undisclosed destinations on behalf of U.S. Immigration and Customs Enforcement (ICE). In the past, the airline provided charter service to sports teams and businesses using Boeing 737 aircraft sporting various seat configurations. The airline filed for Chapter 11 bankruptcy protection on March 9, 2010, after it was unable to meet the payment demands of one of its largest creditors, fuel supplier Mercury Air Group.

== History ==
The airline began operations in July 1990 as a privately held company to fly for the NBA's Sacramento Kings.

Initially, the company provided service for the Kansas City Kings in a single BAC One-Eleven under FAR-125. In 2002, Sky King received its FAR-121 certificate and 98% of the company's flying was for hockey teams. A series of events in 2005, including the NHL lockout, the devastation of Hurricane Katrina, and the spike in jet fuel prices required Sky King to find an alternate way of running its business. This resulted in the adoption of the ACMI (Aircraft Crew Maintenance and Insurance) model and a partnership with Gold Transportation was forged.

In March 2010, Sky King filed for Chapter 11 bankruptcy protection. Sky King emerged from this Chapter 11 bankruptcy in June 2011. Following a successful reorganization in June 2010, the airline moved its headquarters from Sacramento, California to Lakeland, Florida. By moving to Lakeland, Sky King was able to reduce its maintenance costs (by eliminating cross-country ferry flights) and focus on expanding the East Coast markets it served. In October 2010, Sky King was purchased by Aviation Capital Partners Group and shifted its focus away from private charters and towards providing scheduled services. At the end of 2010, Sky King had over 270 employees.

At the end of August 2012, Sky King returned three aircraft to its owner, AerSale, in Roswell, NM. At the same time, Sky King again filed for Chapter 11 bankruptcy protection and laid off over 20 pilots, 30 flight attendants, and others in operations, maintenance, and the Lakeland office.

In December 2013, Sky King furloughed/laid off nearly half of its staff across all departments and returned one airplane to the leasing company. As of December 31, 2013, Sky King had two airplanes in its fleet, one of which had been grounded for several months with a bad engine that needed to be replaced. Also in December, the New Jersey Division of Gaming Enforcement revealed that Sky King owed $23,424.26 in taxes to New Jersey from 2009, thus prohibited from doing air charter business with Atlantic City casinos.

Sky King emerged from Chapter 11 bankruptcy on October 3, 2014, upon confirmation by the United States Bankruptcy Court of the Trustee's Plan of Reorganization. Sky King was acquired by AerLine Holdings LLC on October 24, 2014. Sky King was acquired by AerLine Holdings LLC on October 24, 2014. Service was resumed on December 22, 2014, after the United States Department of Transportation found the carrier "fit, willing and able" to resume service with up to ten aircraft.

On August 30, 2017, Songbird entered into an agreement with USGlobal Airways for the purchase of Songbird's stock for $6.5 million with a closing date of October 15, 2017. On November 30, 2017, USGlobal Airways issued a press release stating that their agreement to purchase Songbird had been terminated as it was not the "best decision for the company".

== Other services ==
=== Direct Air ===
From March until May 2007, Sky King operated a single aircraft for Direct Air. In early 2011, Sky King teamed up again with Direct Air and flew two aircraft for the company. Depending on the season, the flying switched from Palm Beach International Airport (during summer), Myrtle Beach (during winter), Punta Gorda (during fall), and Lakeland (year-round). Direct Air abruptly ceased operations on March 13, 2012.

=== Cuban charters ===
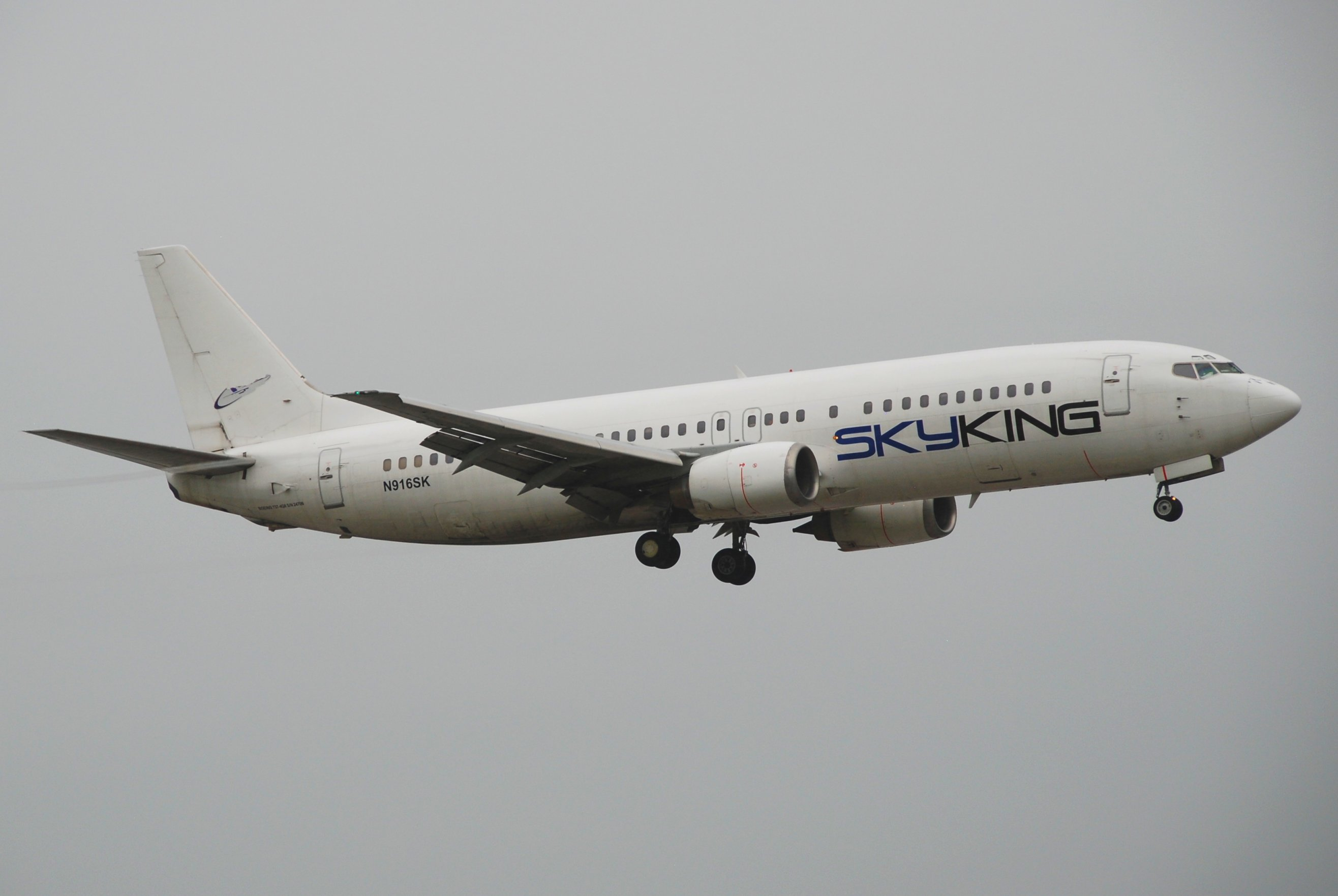
A Sky King Boeing 737-400 landing in Miami after a flight from Cuba

Sky King provided charter aircraft to numerous touring agencies with flights into Cuba. Flights to Cuba originated from Miami and Tampa. The majority of the flights into Cuba were to Cienfuegos, Havana, Camaguey, Holguin, and Santiago de Cuba.

=== Fly Guam ===
In early spring 2011, Sky King agreed to provide ACMI service to start-up company Fly Guam, flying a single Boeing 737-400. Initially, the company operated flights out of Guam to Saipan, continuing to Hong Kong. In the coming months, the company opened routes to Nagoya, Japan, and Koror, Palau. In November 2011, Sky King's parent company Aviation Capital Partners Group purchased a 51% stake. Fly Guam ceased operations at the end of 2011.

== Fleet ==
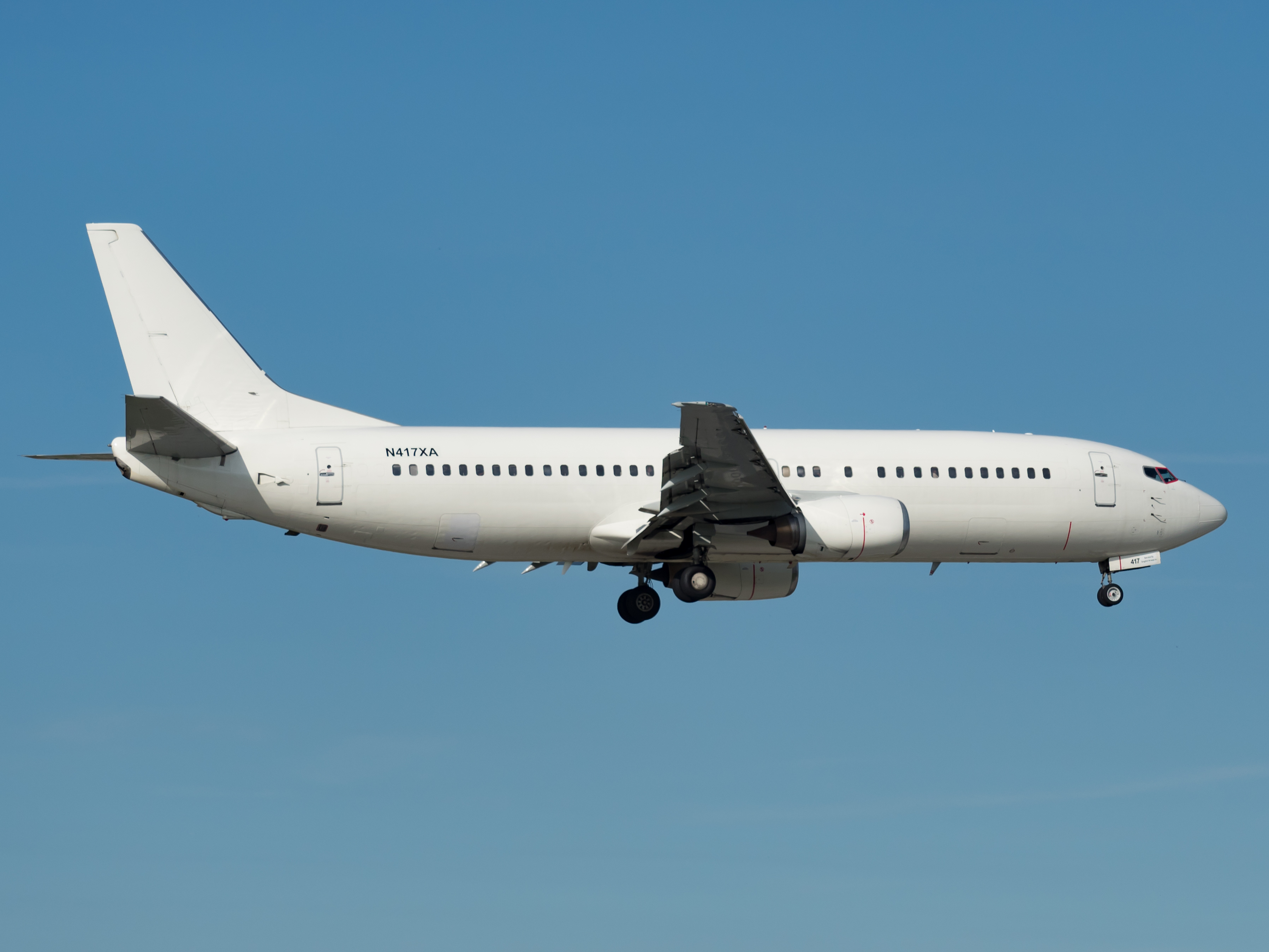
A Songbird Boeing 737-400 landing at Miami International Airport in 2016

The airline previously operated the following the aircraft:

Aircraft	Total	Introduced	Retired	Notes
BAC One-Eleven Series 400AK	1	1998	2000	
BAC One-Eleven Series 400AK	1	2003	2004	
Boeing 737-200	12	1998	2012	
Boeing 737-300	2	2011	2012	
Boeing 737-400	5	2009	2018	
Boeing 767-200ER	1	2009	2011	

== See also ==
- List of defunct airlines of the United States
