= Newman's Airport =

Public airpark in Kalamazoo, Michigan

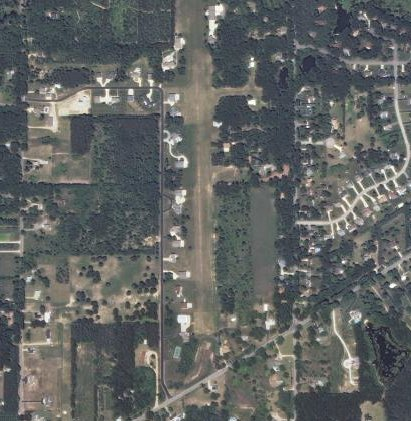
- IATA: none; ICAO: none; FAA LID: 4N0

Summary
- Airport type: Public
- Operator: Daniel Wilkinson
- Location: Kalamazoo, Michigan
- Time zone: UTC−05:00 (-5)
  - Summer (DST): UTC−04:00 (-4)
- Elevation AMSL: 840 ft / 256 m
- Coordinates: 42°17′20″N 085°45′00″W
- Interactive map of Newman's Airport

Runways
Direction	Length		Surface
Direction	ft	m	Surface
18/36	2,697	822	Sod

Newman's Airport (FAA LID: 4N0) is a privately owned, public airport located 7 mi (11.3 km) west of Kalamazoo, Michigan, United States. It is a choice for many pilots in the area who wish to avoid the Kalamazoo-Battle Creek International Airport. Newman's is an airpark community consisting of 13 homes each with private hangars. The airport offers tie-downs and hangars.

On average, 96 aircraft operations occur per week, with 90% being local general aviation. No commercial airlines service Newman's. 20 aircraft are based on the field.

== History ==
Newman's Airport is named after Howard "Budd" Newman. He built the airport after moving from Detroit to the Kalamazoo area. After working multiple welding jobs he decided to open his own welding shop and incorporate his other passion, flying. He built the first east/west runway, now a taxiway, in the early 1950s and began utilizing it to fly parts in and out of his shop. Over the next 40 plus years, Newman slowly purchased more land allowing for the north/south runway, the current runway, to be built.

In 1998, the airfield and surrounding land was sold, and in 1999 was subdivided to create the Skyview Estates community. There are currently 13 homes surrounding the airstrip, each with a private hangar with runway access.

== Facilities and aircraft ==
The airport has one runway, which is made of turf. It is designated as runway 18/36 and measures 2697 x 125 ft (822 x 38 m). For the 12-month period ending December 31, 2014, the airport has 1,508 aircraft operations per year, an average of 29 per week. It is all general aviation. For the same time period, 18 aircraft are based at the airport: 16 single-engine airplanes and 2 helicopters.

The airport does not have a fixed-base operator, and no fuel is available at the airport.

== Events ==
Every August, the airport hosts an annual fly-in breakfast. This brings upwards of 100 planes and several hundred people in attendance.

== See also ==
- List of airports in Michigan
