= Fly Guam =

IATA	ICAO	Call sign
-	-	-
- Founded: November 2008; 16 years ago
- Commenced operations: March 4, 2011; 14 years ago
- Operating bases: Antonio B. Won Pat International Airport (Guam)
- Fleet size: 1
- Destinations: 5
- Headquarters: Barrigada, Guam
- Key people: CEO Jeffrey Stern
- Website: www.flyguam.com

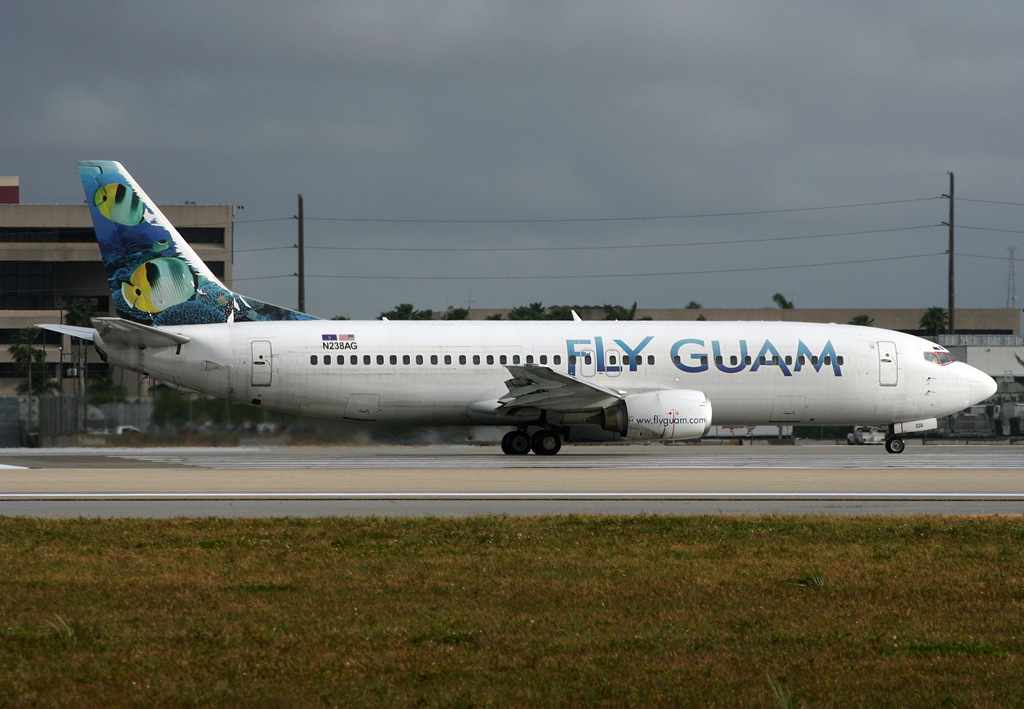
Boeing 737-400 registered N238AG at Miami

Fly Micronesia LLC doing business as Fly Guam is a company incorporated in the United States territory of Guam which operated public charter flights operated by Sky King, Inc. Its headquarters are in Tiyan, Barrigada. The company slogan is We're Different.

== History ==
In November 2009 CEO Jeffrey Stern along with executive directors visited Guam looking for business opportunities in Micronesia. Upon finding a niche market between Guam and Asia they began the process of creating the new company. A year later, November 2010, Fly Micronesia LLC d.b.a. Fly Guam was registered on Guam.

On March 4, 2011, the inaugural flight flew from Guam via Saipan to Hong Kong

Service to Palau began on August 4, 2011. Fly Guam began service to Taipei on August 20, 2011.

The airline has not operated a flight since January 2012.

== Destinations ==
Fly Guam served the following destinations at the time of its last flight:

Guam

- Antonio B. Won Pat International Airport

Hong Kong

- Hong Kong International Airport [Seasonal]

Japan

- Nagoya - Chūbu Centrair International Airport

Palau

- Koror City - Roman Tmetuchl International Airport

Northern Mariana Islands

- Saipan - Saipan International Airport

Taiwan

- Taipei - Taiwan Taoyuan International Airport

== Fleet ==
Fly Guam chartered a single Boeing 737-400 (N238AG) configured with 12 business class and 132 economy seats leased on an ACMI contract with Sky King.

== See also ==
- List of defunct airlines of the United States
