= Kalamazoo/Battle Creek International Airport =

Airport in Michigan, US

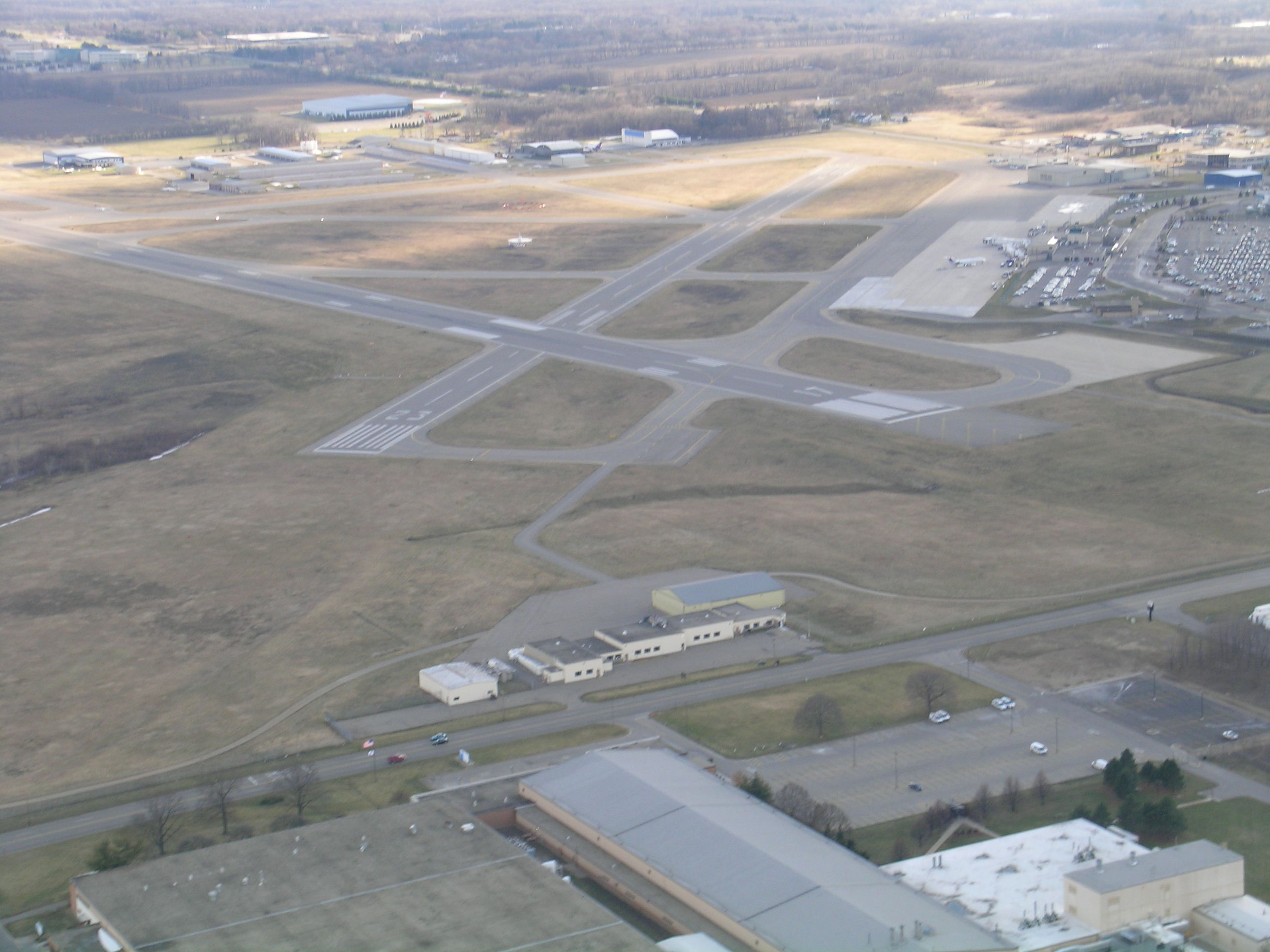
- IATA: AZO; ICAO: KAZO; FAA LID: AZO

Summary
- Airport type: Public
- Owner: Kalamazoo County
- Operator: Kalamazoo County Aeronautics Board of Trustees
- Serves: Kalamazoo / Battle Creek, Michigan
- Elevation AMSL: 874 ft (266 m)
- Coordinates: 42°14′06″N 85°33′07″W
- Website: www.azoairport.com

Map
- Location of airport in Michigan AZO (the United States)

Runways
Direction	Length		Surface
Direction	ft	m	Surface
17/35	6,502	1,982	Asphalt
05/23	3,439	1,048	Asphalt
09/27	2,800	853	Asphalt

Statistics (2025)
- Total passengers: 171,111 ▼7.7%
- Total enplanements: 87,732 ▼7.0%
- Aircraft operations: 51,831 ▲3.1%
- Based aircraft: 128 ▲16.4%
- Source: FAA, Michigan DOT

Kalamazoo/Battle Creek International Airport (IATA: AZO, ICAO: KAZO, FAA LID: AZO) is a county-owned public airport in Kalamazoo, Kalamazoo County, Michigan, US, 3 miles (4.8 km) southeast of Downtown Kalamazoo. The airport is located approximately 20 miles (32 km) west of the city of Battle Creek. It is included in the Federal Aviation Administration (FAA) National Plan of Integrated Airport Systems for 2025–2029, in which it is categorized as a non-hub primary commercial service facility.

The airport has an Airport Traffic Control Tower (ATCT) and a Terminal Radar Approach Control (TRACON). It has one passenger terminal and five gates. Two airlines operate flights in and out of AZO.

== History ==
Plans for an airport in Kalamazoo began in 1925. In May 1926, the City of Kalamazoo purchased 383 acres (1.55 km^{2}) near Portage and Kilgore roads and an airport opened. The first regular air mail service started in July 1928. In February 1929, the field was licensed as the first municipal airport in Michigan. It was named Lindbergh Field in honor of famous aviator Charles Lindbergh. Airline service came to Kalamazoo in May 1944. Two commuter airlines, Francis Airways and Northern Skyways, provided service to other Michigan cities, then ceased the flights after two years. From 1946 and 1955, several small airlines offered commuter flights to nearby cities.

In May 1955, North Central Airlines began daily service to Detroit and Chicago. North Central became Republic Airlines, which merged into Northwest Airlines, which in turn merged into Delta Air Lines – which serves the airport today.

In 1961, an airport traffic control tower was built and the main runway was extended from 3,900 feet to 5,300. In 1963, an instrument landing system was installed to help during poor weather. In 1977, the runway was further lengthened to 6,500 feet.

In 1975, the regional air traffic control facility was moved from Battle Creek to Kalamazoo, and, in 1978, a radar facility was installed. The airport eventually won an award for the safest and most efficient air traffic control system in the Great Lakes region.

In 1982, the Core Council decided that the City of Kalamazoo should no longer bear the full cost of operating the airport, and, in 1984, the City transferred ownership to the County of Kalamazoo. In 1989, the name was changed from Kalamazoo County Airport to Kalamazoo/Battle Creek International to stimulate economic growth in the Battle Creek area. That year, the county also renovated the terminal, doubling its size and expanding the ramp. Over the next four years, passengers increased from 200,000 to more than 500,000 per annum.

In 2011, the Kalamazoo/Battle Creek International Airport was served by two major airlines who flew passengers to major hubs with worldwide connections. There was also a public charter airline operating twice weekly from Kalamazoo to locations in Florida.

As of May 2012, the airport was served by two major commercial airlines who flew passengers to three major hubs. The public charter Direct Air was subject to Chapter 7 liquidation on April 12, 2012, and has since ceased all operations.

In November 2021, United Airlines announced that it would end service to AZO, effective January 3, 2022. The departure by United left only Delta and American as major airlines with service to Kalamazoo/Battle Creek.

In 2022, low-cost airline startup Avelo Airlines started twice-weekly flights between Kalamazoo and Orlando. However, in July 2024, the carrier terminated this service, citing unprofitability.

In January 2026, United Airlines announced it would return to AZO again on Thursday, April 30, with four flights daily to Chicago O’Hare International and four flights from O’Hare to compete with American.

=== Major jetport ===
In the 1970s, there were discussions between North Central Airlines and local city officials about building a new airport to serve Battle Creek and Kalamazoo. Since the two airports are close, it was not economical for the airlines to fully serve both of the airports. They proposed a "Major Jetport" in the Kalamazoo area, which might have become the third-busiest commuter airport in the nation. No location could be agreed upon, and no planning was ever completed beyond the preliminary proposals and meetings. Soon after the concept failed, most airline service was shifted to Kalamazoo, as the Kalamazoo airport had more passengers and more demand for flights.

== Facilities and aircraft ==
Kalamazoo/Battle Creek International Airport covers 832 acres (337 ha) at an elevation of 874 feet (266 m) above mean sea level. It has three asphalt runways: 17/35, 6,502 ft × 150 ft (1,982 m × 46 m), 05/23, 3,439 ft × 100 ft (1,048 m × 30 m) and 09/27, 2,800 ft × 60 ft (853 m × 18 m).

Present-day taxiways Delta and Alpha were originally runways.

For the 12-month period ending December 31, 2022, the airport had 52,162 flight operations. This included 82% general aviation, 18% air taxi and commercial, and <1% military. This is down from the historical average annual operations in the 1990s of 101,754. Current based aircraft at the airport include 127 aircraft: 92 single-engine and 15 multi-engine airplanes as well as 20 jets.

=== 2007 re-phasing plan ===
In 2007, the threshold of runway 17/35 was moved 400 feet (122 m) to the south, and taxiway B was closed north of taxiway C. South of runway 09/27, taxiway B was removed and rebuilt 100 feet (30 m) to the west.

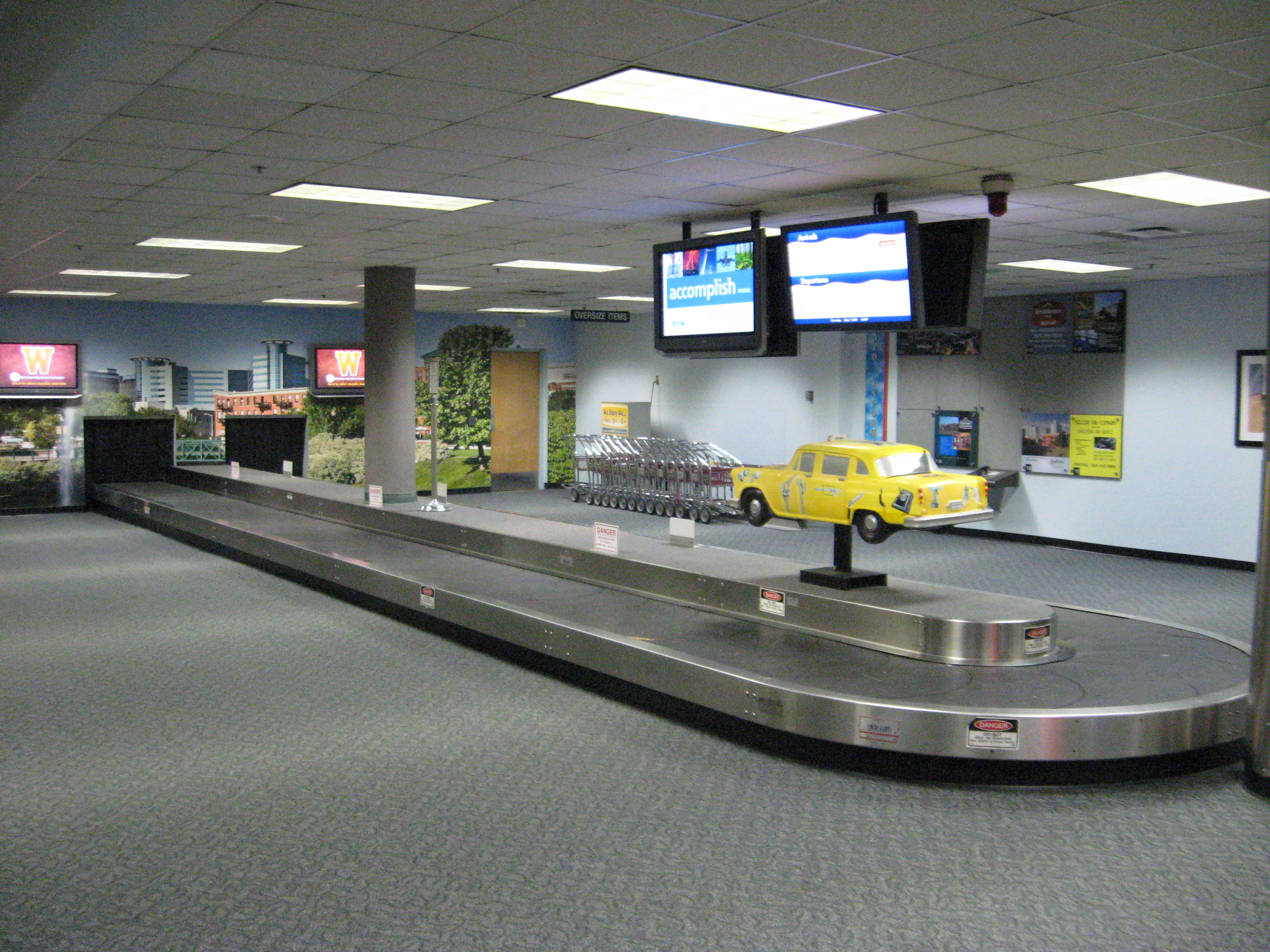
Interior of the old terminal at the Kalamazoo Airport

== Operations ==
=== General aviation ===
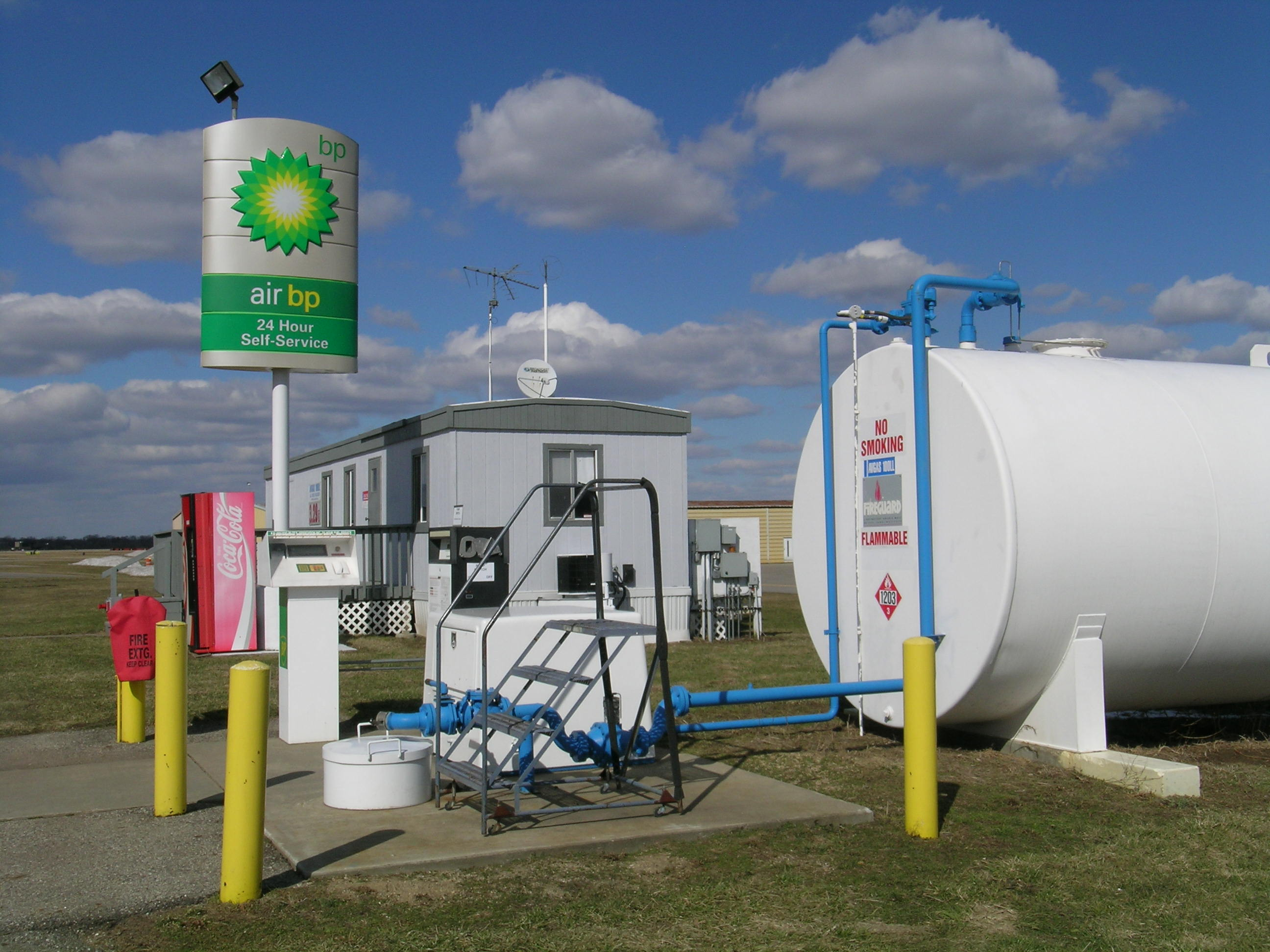
The KPA Fueling Center

Kalamazoo Airport is used by transient and local private pilots flying for personal reasons, business, or recreation. Many local pilots keep their aircraft in the south T-hangar complex.

In 1955, the Kalamazoo-based Upjohn Pharmaceutical Company began operating aircraft for its executives from the airport. This continued after the firm was acquired by Pfizer. In 1997, after Pharmacia & Upjohn moved its North American sales office from Michigan to New Jersey, the company made daily service to New Jersey available to all employees on a 10-seat jet. Pfizer expanded the service after acquiring Pharmacia Corp. in 2003 and based two 36-passenger jets at the airport. But, in June 2008, the aviation unit was closed after 53 years to save money. The move axed 27 jobs; the aircraft were moved to Trenton, New Jersey. As of April 2009, the hangar and property at the Kalamazoo Airport were up for sale.

General aviation aircraft are served by FBOs Duncan Aviation, RAI Jets, the Kalamazoo Pilot Association, and Kalamazoo Aircraft Inc. Besides fuel, these businesses combined offer services such as customer shuttles, aircraft maintenance, private jet charters, and both routine and major maintenance.

=== Flight training ===
Flight training is offered through Kal-Aero Flight Instruction.

The Western Michigan University College of Aviation, founded in 1939, used the Kalamazoo/Battle Creek International Airport as a base for its flight school until 1997. In the early 1990s, the flight school began to outgrow the facilities, and, in 1997, the college moved to Battle Creek's W. K. Kellogg Airport, where all operations are presently housed. The WMU aviation unit at Kalamazoo has been used from time to time by the college, but not since May 2006.

In the 1970s, private flight training operations were restricted to two local FBOs: Kal Aero and Lakala Aviation. The county government received many complaints about unauthorized lessons from private parties. Upon these reports, the county government added to the flight training ordinance that violators could be fined $500, or jailed for 90 days, if found guilty of offering flight lessons illegally. This restriction has since been lifted, but those providing flight instruction must have an agreement with the airport and follow airport rules and regulations.

== Airlines and destinations ==
Airlines	Destinations
American Eagle	Chicago–O'Hare
Delta Connection	Detroit

== Statistics ==
=== Top domestic destinations ===
Busiest domestic routes from AZO (September 2025 – August 2026)
Rank	Airport	Passengers	Carriers
1	Detroit, Michigan	54,000	Delta
2	Chicago–O'Hare, Illinois	40,000	American

=== Airline market share ===
Largest airlines at AZO (September 2025 – August 2026)
Rank	Airline	Passengers	Share
1	SkyWest Airlines	121,000	66.55%
2	Envoy Air	57,130	31.41%
3	Endeavor Air	3,710	2.04%

=== Competition ===
The facility competes with airports in nearby communities such as South Bend, Grand Rapids, Chicago, and Detroit. Furthermore, the airport has used several grants and incentives to attract and retain additional flights and carriers in recent years.

== Terminal ==
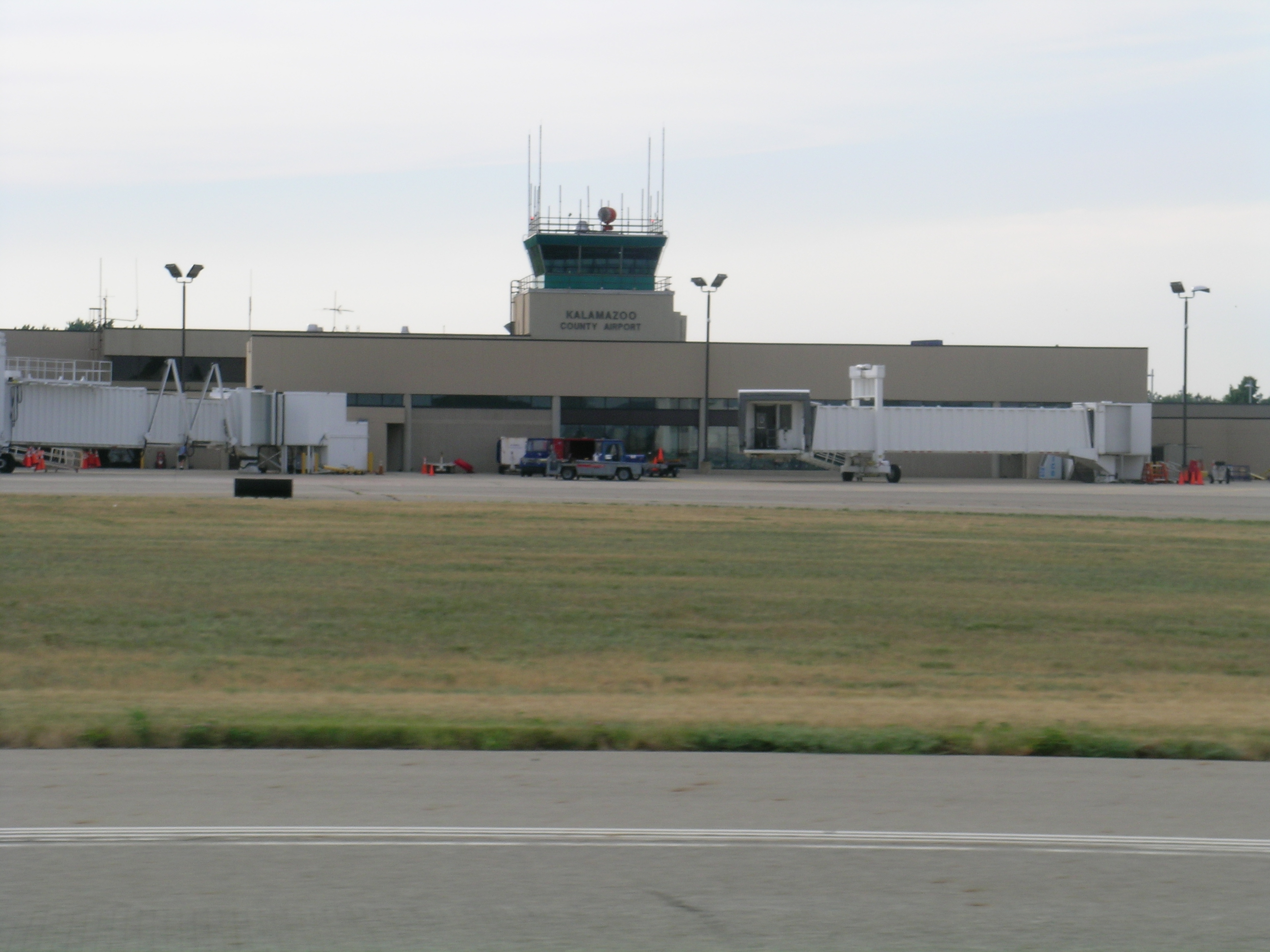
The former AZO Terminal and ATC Tower

The original Kalamazoo terminal was a small building made with scrap materials left over from other local projects. In 1958, a new terminal was constructed to replace the 1920s terminal. The growth led to a terminal expansion in 1979, and the building increased from 12,000 to 30,000 square feet (2,800 m^{2}). The terminal was completely renovated in 1989, with the addition of a new concourse, an enlarged boarding area, and a new baggage claim area.

The Kalamazoo Airport's 1958 terminal had two jetways and housed the air traffic control tower. A Non-Radar Approach Control, located in Battle Creek and servicing Kalamazoo, was Commissioned in 1969. The air traffic control tower provides ATC services between the hours of 6:00–23:00 local time. When the control tower is operational, the airport lies within FAA Class "D" airspace. When the approach control is operational, pilots may elect to receive radar services associated within a Terminal Radar Service Area (TRSA). The Terminal Control Center (TRACON) facility was not established until 1975, and radar was not installed until 1978.

In 2009, construction on a new terminal began next to the existing facility. The new terminal, designed by Reynolds, Smith & Hills, opened in April 2011 and accommodates additional passenger gates, security lanes, and baggage carousels.

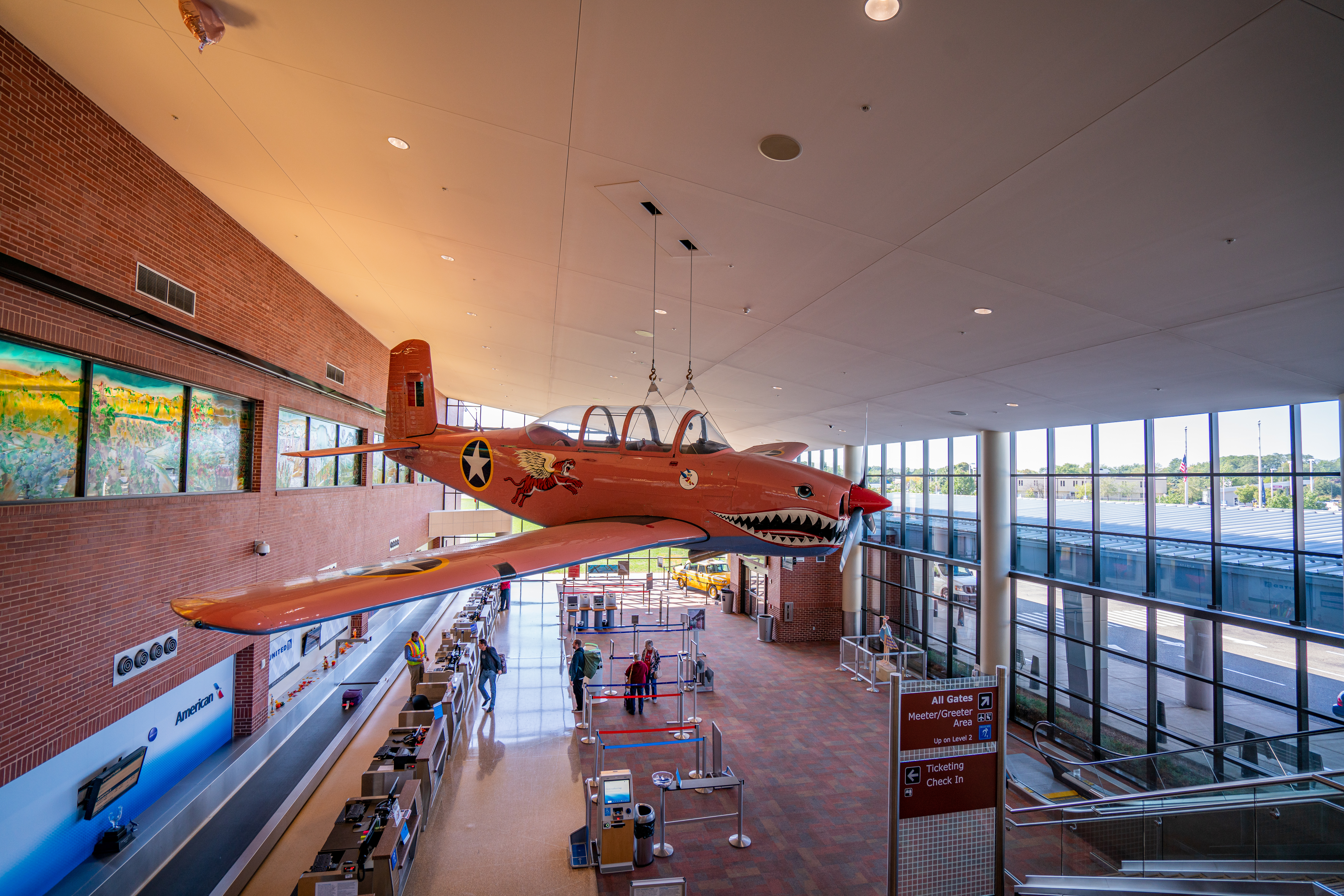
A view of the new terminal and the airline ticket counter. The aircraft in the foreground is a Beechcraft T-34 Mentor loaned to the airport for display.

== Kalamazoo Aviation History Museum ==
Commonly referred to as the "Air Zoo", the museum offers many historic aircraft, simulators, a restaurant, and one of the region's only 4-D theaters. The museum is housed in two buildings, and is located on the south section of the field. The museum also has a fly in ramp, making it an attraction for many visiting pilots. In June and October 2011 the Air Zoo opened a new 50,000 square feet (4,600 m^{2}) building connecting it to the main building allowing all the attractions and exhibits to be in one easy to see location. The original building (East Campus) was renovated to house the restoration center.

== Incidents and accidents ==
Several accidents and incidents have occurred at Kalamazoo/Battle Creek International Airport. These incidents are responded to by the onsite CFR team.

- On September 19, 1996, a privately owned Grumman F9F-2 Panther crashed while takeoff on runway 35. Pilot attempted a takeoff abort but over ran the end of the runway crashed through a boundary fence, crossed over Kilgore Road, and came to rest on an embankment. Pilot suffered numerous injuries and aircraft was a total loss.
- On April 19, 1998, a Piper PA-28 Series Aircraft crashed. Witnesses reported seeing the airplane liftoff runway 5 past the runway 17/35 intersection located approximately 3,108 feet (947 m) from the approach end of runway 5. Runway 5 was 3,999 feet (1,219 m) long at the time of the accident. Witnesses reported the airplane climbed to 250 to 300 feet (76 to 91 m) when the airplane rolled left and went straight down. The airplane burst into flames and the cockpit and fuselage were consumed by fire. All passengers died.
- On October 27, 2009, a single-engine Beechcraft crashed. The aircraft landed north of the airport, but not on the runway. It skidded through the fence and came to rest in the parking lot of Great Lakes Aviation, just outside the airfield. The aircraft was reported to be en route to Muskoka, Ontario when it experienced some mechanical problem and then crash landed at the north end of the runway. The pilot, who was also the only occupant, died in the accident.
- On November 1, 2019, a small plane crashed after takeoff at the airport due to a mechanical issue. The pilot attempted to return to a runway but instead landed on a grass field nearby.

== See also ==
- Kalamazoo Transportation Center
- Newman's Airport, a general aviation airport located in Kalamazoo
- List of airports in Michigan
