= World Atlantic Airlines =

Airline of the United States

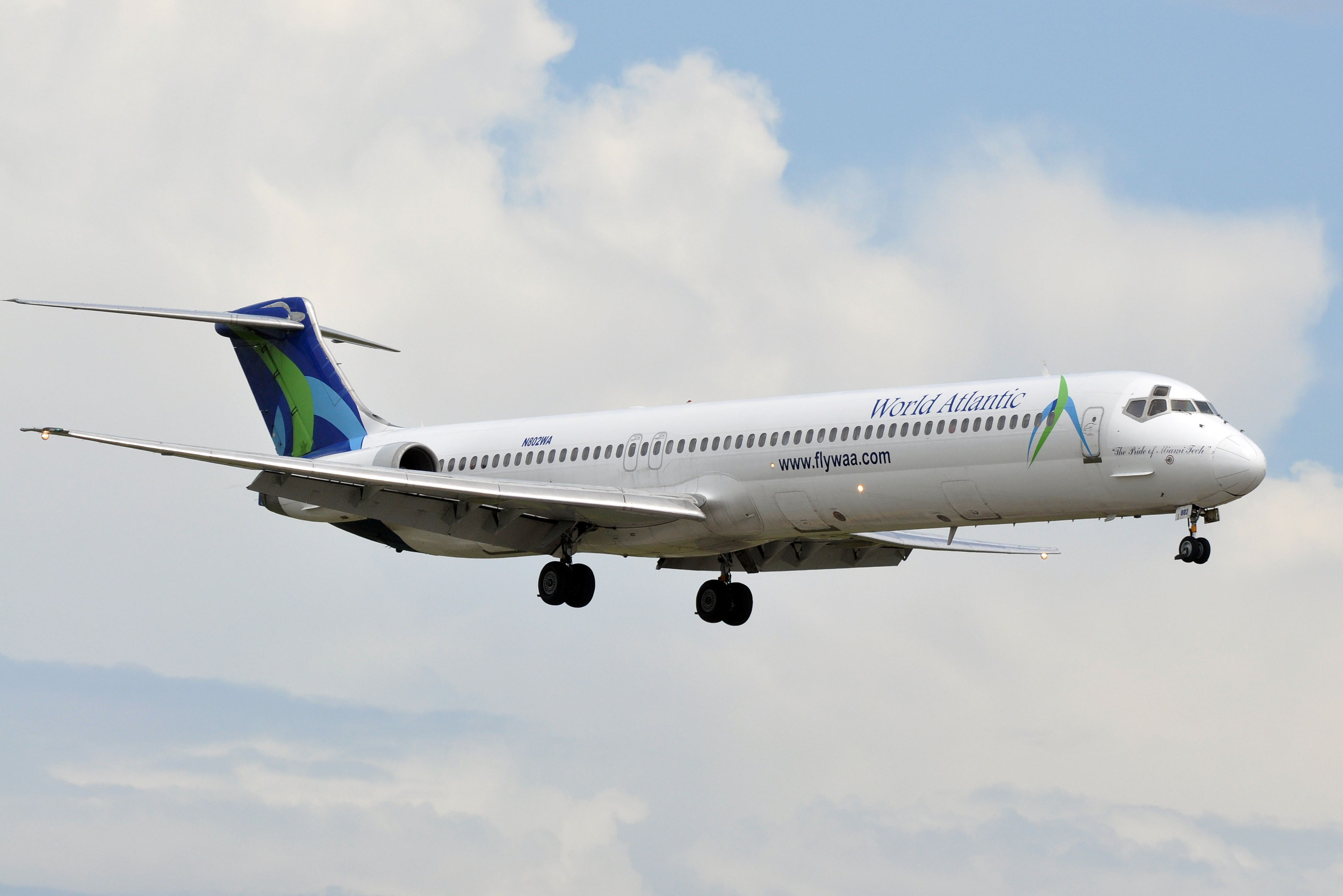
IATA	ICAO	Call sign
WL	WAL	DORAL
- Founded: September 2002; 24 years ago (as Caribbean Sun Airlines)
- Commenced operations: January 2003; 23 years ago
- AOC #: 2WAA860M
- Hubs: Miami International Airport
- Fleet size: 3
- Headquarters: Virginia Gardens, Florida, United States
- Key people: Tomas Romero (President); Ernesto Jam (CFO); Patrick Joseph (Chief Operating Officer)
- Website: www.flywaa.com

Caribbean Sun Airlines Inc., trading as World Atlantic Airlines, is an airline in the United States, operating on-demand and scheduled charter services. Its corporate headquarters are located in Virginia Gardens, Florida.

== History ==
The airline was founded in September 2002 as Caribbean Sun Airlines in Fort Lauderdale, Florida, and began operations in January 2003 with flights from Luis Muñoz Marín International Airport in San Juan, Puerto Rico, to Tortola, using the Bombardier Dash 8 Q100. On the flights, Caribbean Sun cooperated with the Antiguan sister company Caribbean Star Airlines, which also belonged to the Stanford Financial Group and enabled connecting flights to other Caribbean islands.

Flight operations ceased towards the end of January 2007. The resumption of the same under the name Merengue Airlines Dominicana, which was sought after a subsequent change of ownership, was also unsuccessful, and so Caribbean Sun Airlines was finally sold to Tomas Romero, who renamed the company to World Atlantic Airlines. The company, which from then on only operated under this name, then focused on the ACMI charter area.

World Atlantic was one of the charter providers to Myrtle Beach Direct Air until the airline's bankruptcy in 2012, and was fined by the Department of Transportation in 2012 for regulatory violations in connection with this business. Since 2013, World Atlantic has acted as a charter provider to the United States Immigration and Customs Enforcement for deportation of individuals from the United States and recently per the NY Post delivering immigrants to Westchester, NY.

In April 2013, World Atlantic transported Venezuelan voters from Miami to New Orleans to vote in the Venezuelan presidential election.

In September 2017, World Atlantic Airlines also entered into a partnership with Venezuelan airline Avior Airlines, having previously worked with LASER Airlines as part of the ACMI charter. As part of the business relationship with Avior Airlines, World Atlantic operated ACMI charter flights to Fort Lauderdale and Miami.

In April 2025, multiple aircraft were seized in relation to a $1.8M court judgement against the airline, leaving just two operational for a period of two days. All aircraft were released before news broke of the seizure.

== Fleet ==
=== Current fleet ===
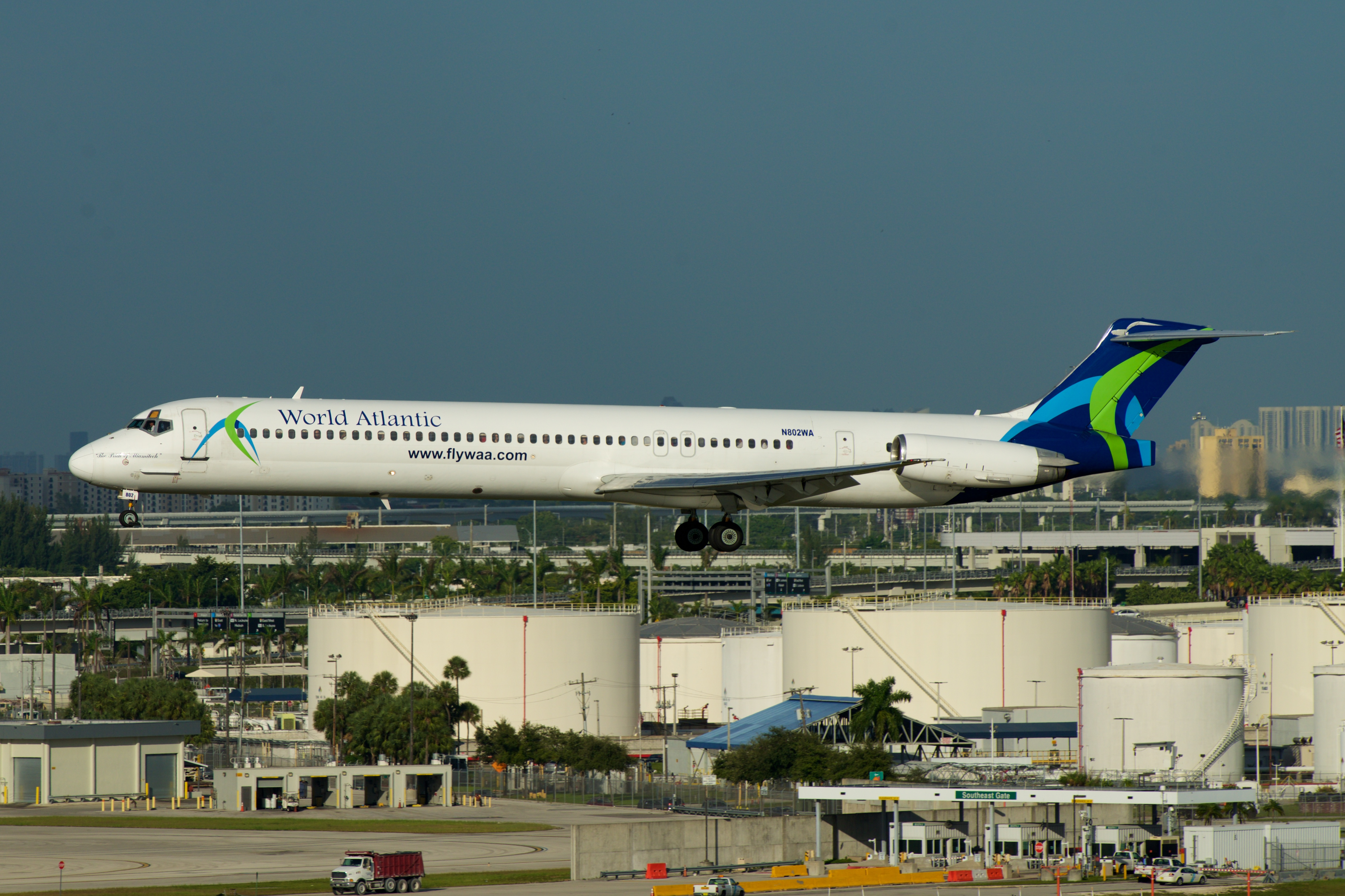
A World Atlantic Airlines McDonnell Douglas MD-83 on approach at Miami International Airport in 2014

As of June 2026, World Atlantic Airlines has an all McDonnell Douglas fleet and operates the following aircraft:

Aircraft	In service	Orders	Passengers			Notes
Aircraft	In service	Orders	F	Y	Total	Notes
McDonnell Douglas MD-83	3	–	12	134	146	–
McDonnell Douglas MD-83	3	–	8	142	150	–
McDonnell Douglas MD-83	3	–	8	144	152	–
McDonnell Douglas MD-83	3	–	8	147	155	–
Total	3	–				

== Accidents and incidents ==
- On April 20, 2018, A McDonnell Douglas MD-83 (registration N807WA) suffered a right-hand main landing gear collapse during landing rollout at Alexandria International Airport, in Louisiana, USA. Due to the gear failure, the right wing dragged on the runway, creating a friction fire which was quickly put out by the airport rescue and firefighting personnel. The aircraft operated on a flight on behalf of the U.S. Immigration and Customs Enforcement and originated from Chicago-O'Hare International Airport. None of the 101 passengers on board were injured, but the aircraft suffered significant damage and was later written off as irreparable.
- On July 10, 2024, A McDonnell Douglas MD-83, (registration N804WA), operating as Flight WAL101, experienced an in-flight emergency shortly after takeoff from El Paso International Airport (KELP) en route to McAllen Miller International Airport (KMFE). The aircraft declared a MAYDAY after reporting a right engine failure and requested an immediate return to El Paso, Texas. Approximately four minutes after departure, the aircraft landed safely on runway 26L at El Paso International Airport and subsequently vacated the runway. Upon landing, the flight crew was informed that the right engine had caught fire.

== See also ==
- List of airlines of the United States
