= USGlobal Airways =

US airline that never flew any passengers

- Founded: August 24, 1989; 36 years ago
- Ceased operations: 2018; 8 years ago
- Headquarters: Stewart International Airport
- Key people: Anthony Koulouris, President (2016–present); Sheryle Milligan, COO (2017–present)
- Founder: Igor Dmitrowsky

USGlobal Airways, formerly known as Baltia Air Lines, Inc., was a publicly traded American corporation. It was founded in August 1989 with the aim of flying from New York City to the then-Soviet Union. It never flew a single commercial flight in its 29-year history, nor generated any revenue outside of that raised from investors. USGlobal's stock was delisted in 2018 for failing to file annual returns. The fate of the airline is unclear since the delisting of the stock in 2018.

== History ==
=== Early years ===
Baltia Airlines was founded in August 1989 by Igor Dmitrowsky in New York City with the aim of operating flights from NYC's John F. Kennedy International Airport to the Soviet Union. In 1991 it was given authority by the United States Department of Transportation to operate from New York City to Leningrad and Riga.

During the initial years of certification, Dmitrowsky made a series of decisions that delayed certification. In 1996, Baltia gained authority to operate flights from New York to St Petersburg. But in 1998, Baltia put a deposit down on an ex Cathay Pacific Boeing 747-200, and the airline did not have enough capital to start flying and the United States Department of Transportation revoked its route authority. In 2007, Baltia received more capital and once again filed to fly from New York to St Petersburg, gaining approval.

In July 2009 a former Pakistan International Airlines Boeing 747-200 was purchased without engines. In 2011 a former Northwest Airlines Boeing 747-200 was purchased and painted in Baltia's livery. The former was laid up at Sultan Abdul Aziz Shah Airport in Malaysia where it was later scrapped, the latter at Oscoda–Wurtsmith Airport in Michigan where it was scrapped in November 2020, at a loss of $1.6 million.

In 2014, Baltia sponsored the Baltia Air Lines Thunder Over Michigan air show at Willow Run Airport in Ypsilanti, Michigan. Over 100,000 people attended the event.

Igor Dmitrowsky died in 2016. Baltia's board of directors elected Anthony Koulouris as president to oversee the continuation of certification and acquisition of aircraft. The first major accomplishment was the election of Connie Kalitta to the company's board of directors on October 31, 2016, subsequently resigning on January 31, 2017. Weeks later, Baltia signed a letter of intent with Kalitta Air to lease one Boeing 767-300ER.

=== Rebrand & restructure ===
With the FAA's approval to continue certification, the company announced on February 3, 2017, that it had begun an organizational restructuring to streamline certification. During the May 11, 2017 shareholder meeting, it was announced the airline would be rebranded as USGlobal Airways and moving operations to Stewart International Airport.

On June 19, 2017, USGlobal airlines filed an 8K with the US Securities and Exchange Commission (SEC) stating that Logistics Air LLC "has made a demand for payment of outstanding payables in the amount of $8,850,000. As of the date hereof, and while not in any manner accepting the validity of Logistic's claim, the Company is in settlement negotiations with Logistic regarding such payment."

On June 27, 2017, the company announced that it had entered into a non-binding letter of intent to purchase Songbird Airways for $6.2 million, with a deposit of $1 million having been placed on June 23, 2017. On September 1, 2017, USGlobal Airways entered into a stock purchase agreement with AerLine Holdings, LLC, for the purchase of Songbird at an aggregate price of $6.5 million, with a closing date of October 15, 2017, but no later than October 31, 2017. On November 30, 2017, the airline issued a press release stating that their agreement to purchase Songbird had been terminated as it was not the "best decision for the company".

On January 24, 2018, the FAA issued an order revoking Baltia Airlines' Certificate of Public Convenience. No further updates have been reported from the Airline and the fate of the airline is uncertain.

== Criticism ==
Neither USGlobal Airways nor Baltia Airlines has ever flown a single commercial flight in its 29-year history. Despite its move to Michigan, where it is easier to gain FAA approval, it has failed all of its certification tests seven times.

In March 2016, the company's former executive vice president and director, Barry Clare, was charged by the SEC, for acting as an unregistered broker of Baltia stock valued at $26 million; the case was settled in August 2016 with a payment of US$1 million.

The airline has been heavily criticized by aviation insiders, who believe the airline may never fly. Benjamin Schlappig, creator of the prominent One Mile At a Time aviation website, has labelled Baltia "a scam" and has said that they are "pretending that they're actually going to start flying some day soon".
