= USA Jet Airlines Flight 199 =

2008 aviation accident

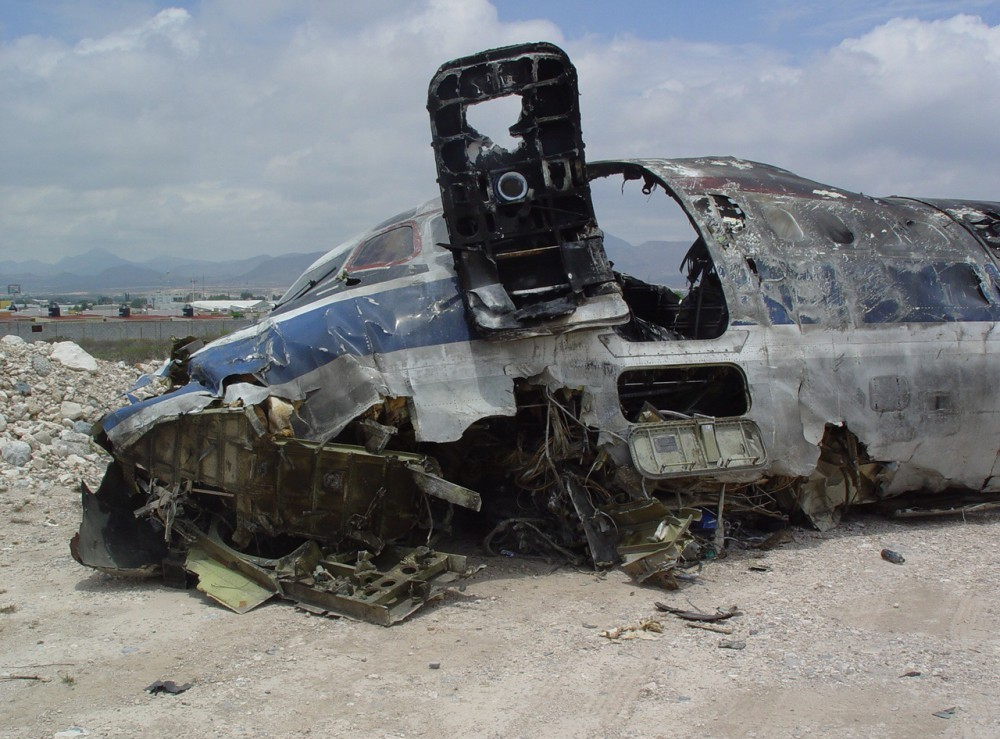
- The wreckage of the cockpit

Accident
- Date: July 6, 2008
- Summary: Crashed on approach due to pilot error
- Site: 0.8 km from Saltillo Airport, Coahuila, Mexico; 25°33′33″N 100°55′45″W

Aircraft
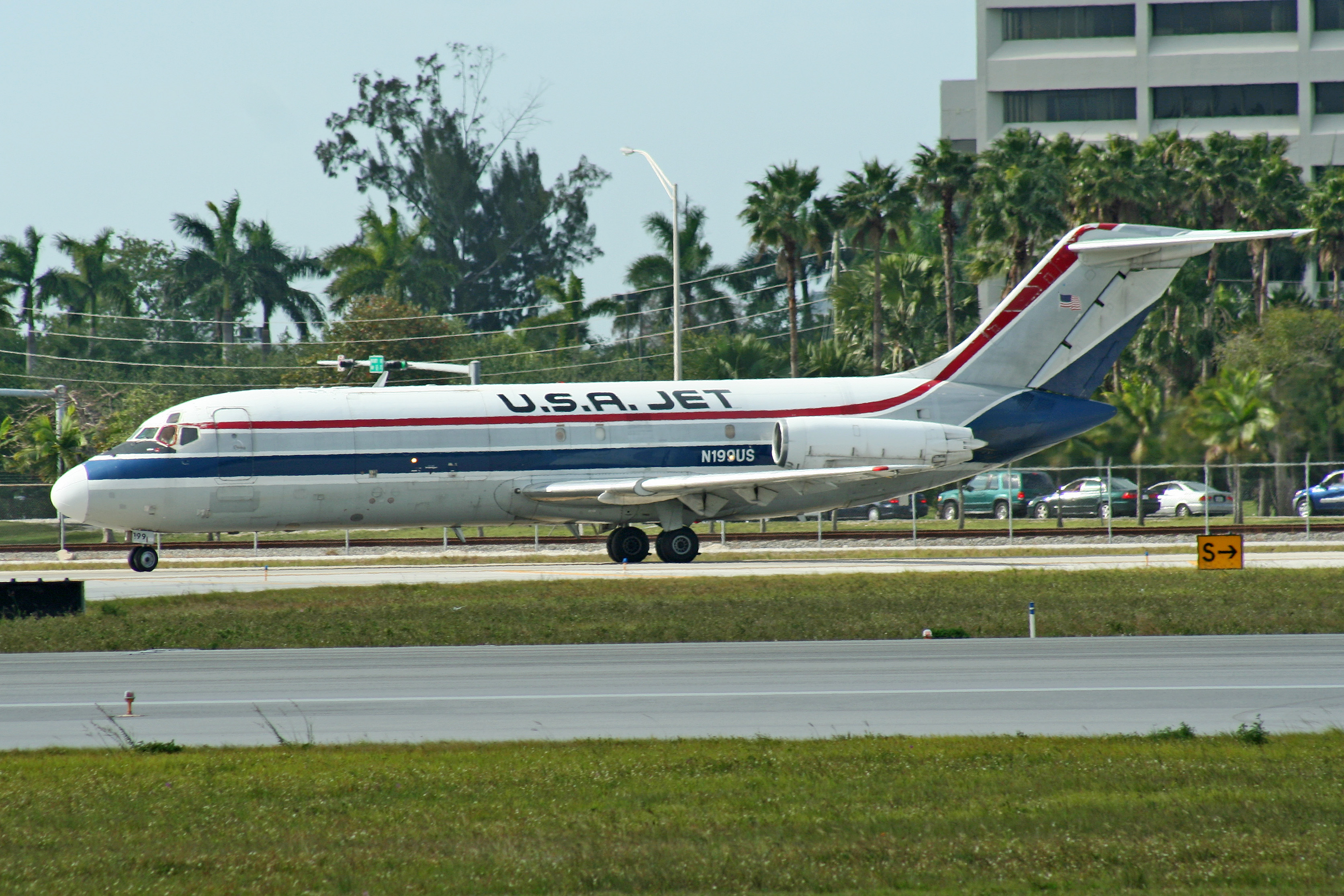
- N199US, the aircraft involved in the accident, in April 2008
- Aircraft type: McDonnell Douglas DC-9-15F
- Operator: USA Jet Airlines
- Call sign: JET USA 199
- Registration: N199US
- Flight origin: Shreveport Regional Airport, Louisiana, United States
- Destination: Saltillo Airport, Coahuila, Mexico
- Occupants: 2
- Passengers: 0
- Crew: 2
- Fatalities: 1
- Injuries: 1
- Survivors: 1

USA Jet Airlines Flight 199 was a scheduled cargo flight from Shreveport to Saltillo Airport. On July 6, 2008, the McDonnell Douglas DC-9 operating the flight crashed on approach to its destination, killing the captain and seriously injuring the first officer who was taken to the hospital. As of 2026, this is the most recent incident involving a McDonnell Douglas DC-9.

== Aircraft ==
The aircraft involved was a McDonnell Douglas DC-9F powered by two Pratt & Whitney JT8D engines, registered as N199US manufactured in 1967, and initially operated by Continental Airlines. The aircraft was converted to a cargo plane in 1984, and acquired by USA Jet Airlines in 1996.

== Accident ==
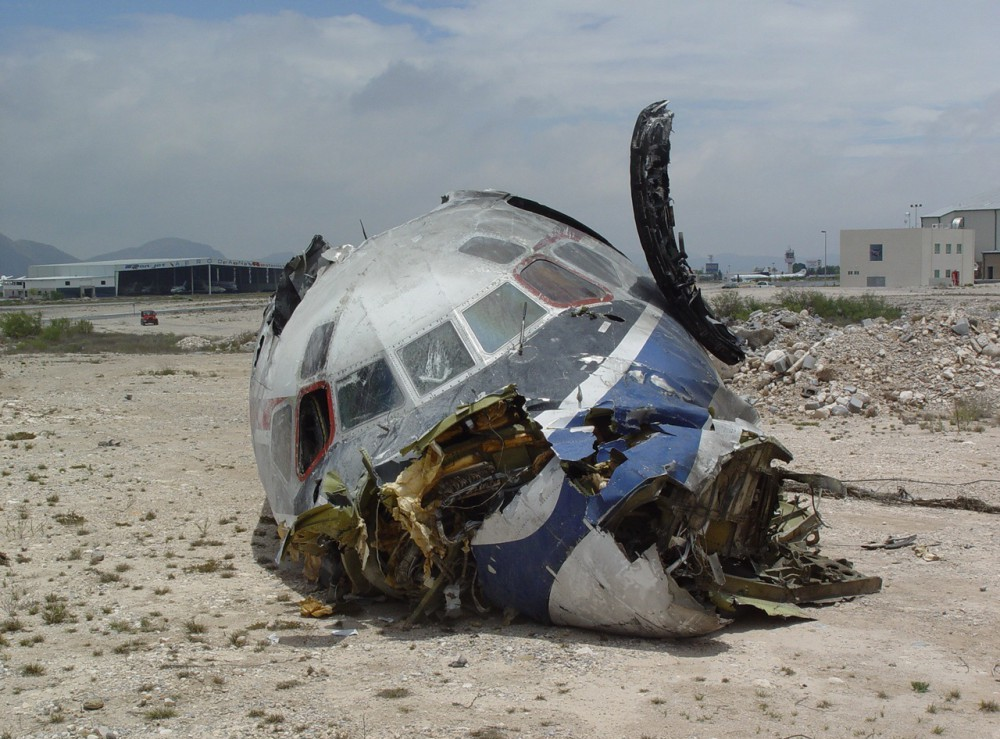
Another angle of the cockpit wreckage

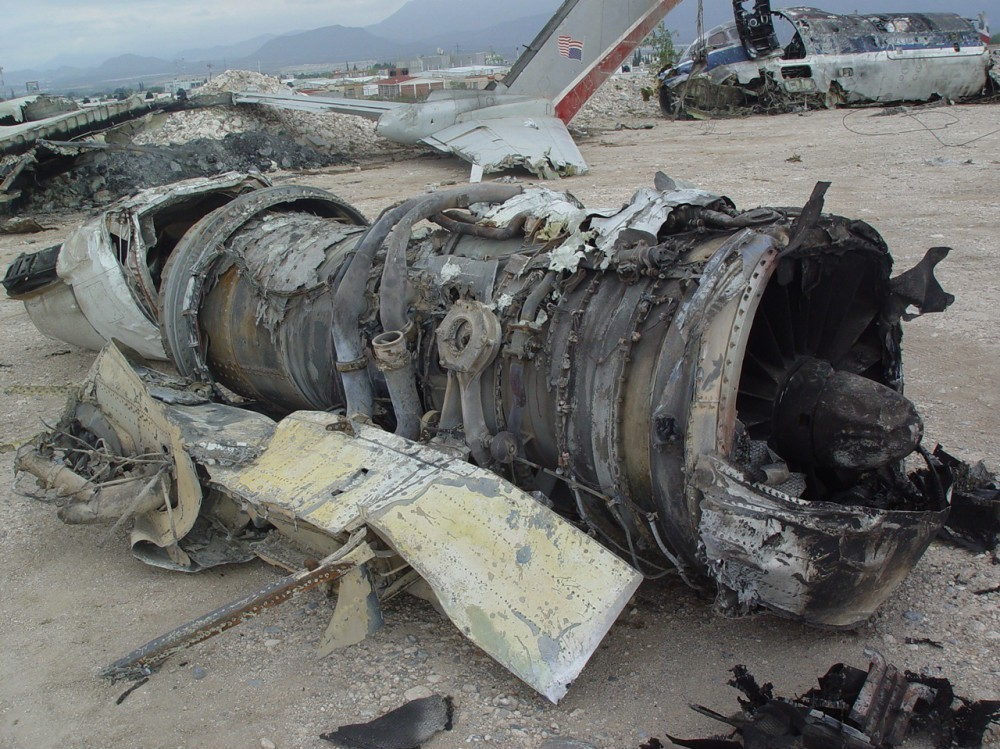
One of the DC-9-15F's engines.

On July 5, the plane flew from Detroit to Hamilton, Canada, to pick up automotive parts to deliver in Mexico. The plane then took off for Shreveport, where it arrived at 11:19 PM local time and departed for Mexico at 11:48 PM. During approach, the crew misidentified runway 35 of the destination airport and attempted a go around, but failed and the plane crashed after hitting wires only 800 m from Saltillo's runway. The aircraft broke up on impact and burned on the ground, coming to a rest near Libramiento José López Portillo, about 200 m away from some Mercury Cargo and DHL hangars.

== Investigation ==
The Mexican Federal Civil Aviation Agency investigated the crash alongside representatives from the National Transportation Safety Board, which nominated Robert Benzon as its accredited representative. The final report stated that the probable causes of the accident were the continuation of an unstable final approach without having the runway in sight and the consequent loss of control during the go around. Contributing factors were pilot fatigue, pilot error, weather at the airport and inexperience of the first officer.
