= USA Jet Airlines =

Cargo airline in Michigan, US

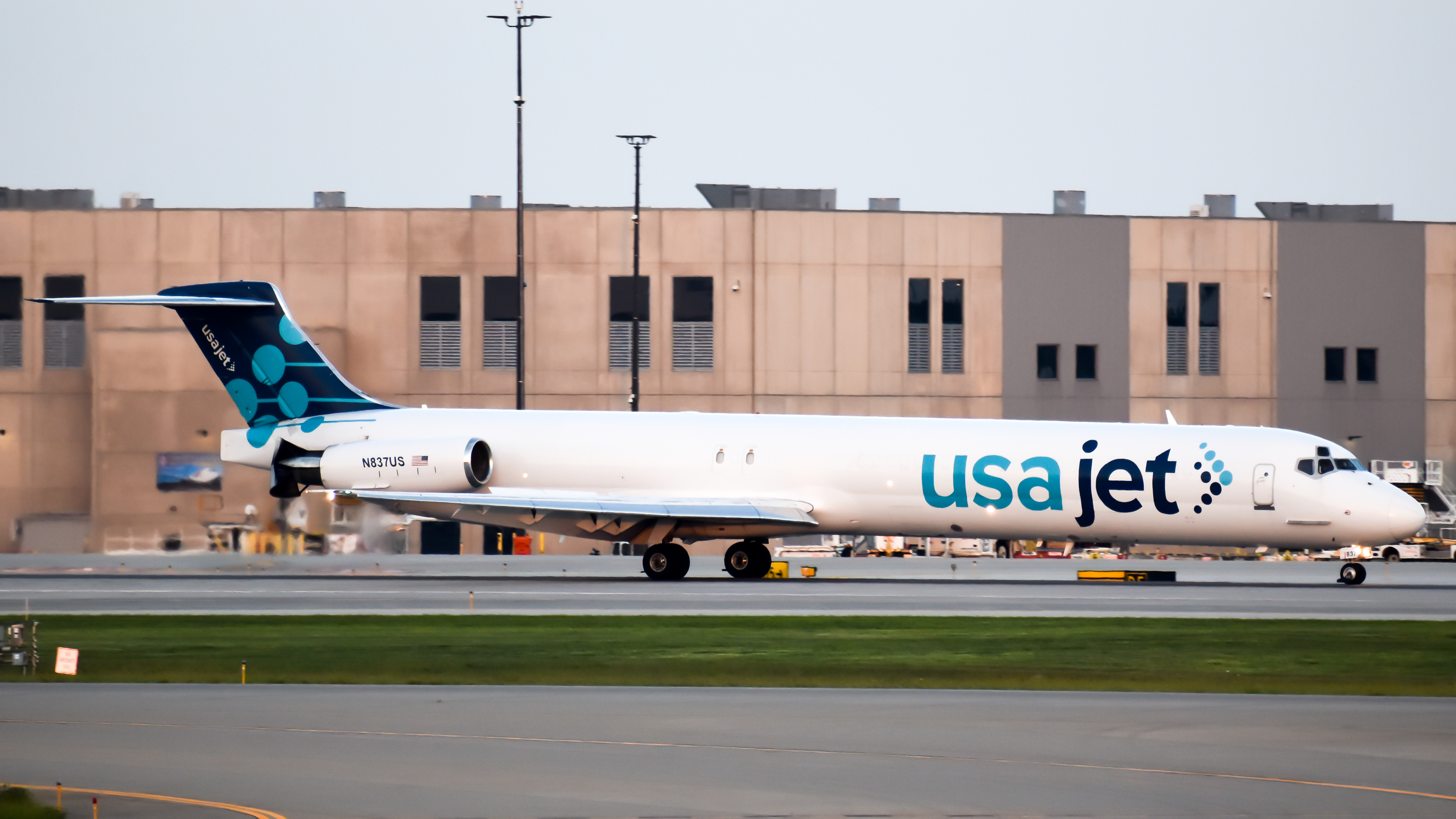
- A USA Jet Airlines McDonnell Douglas MD-88SF
IATA	ICAO	Call sign
UJ	JUS	JET USA
- Founded: 1994; 32 years ago
- AOC #: Y2PA154Y
- Operating bases: Willow Run Airport; Laredo International Airport
- Fleet size: 15
- Parent company: Ascent Global Logistics
- Headquarters: Willow Run Airport, Van Buren Township, Michigan, U.S.
- Key people: Christopher Jamroz (Executive Chairman); John Heaney (President)
- Website: usajet.aero

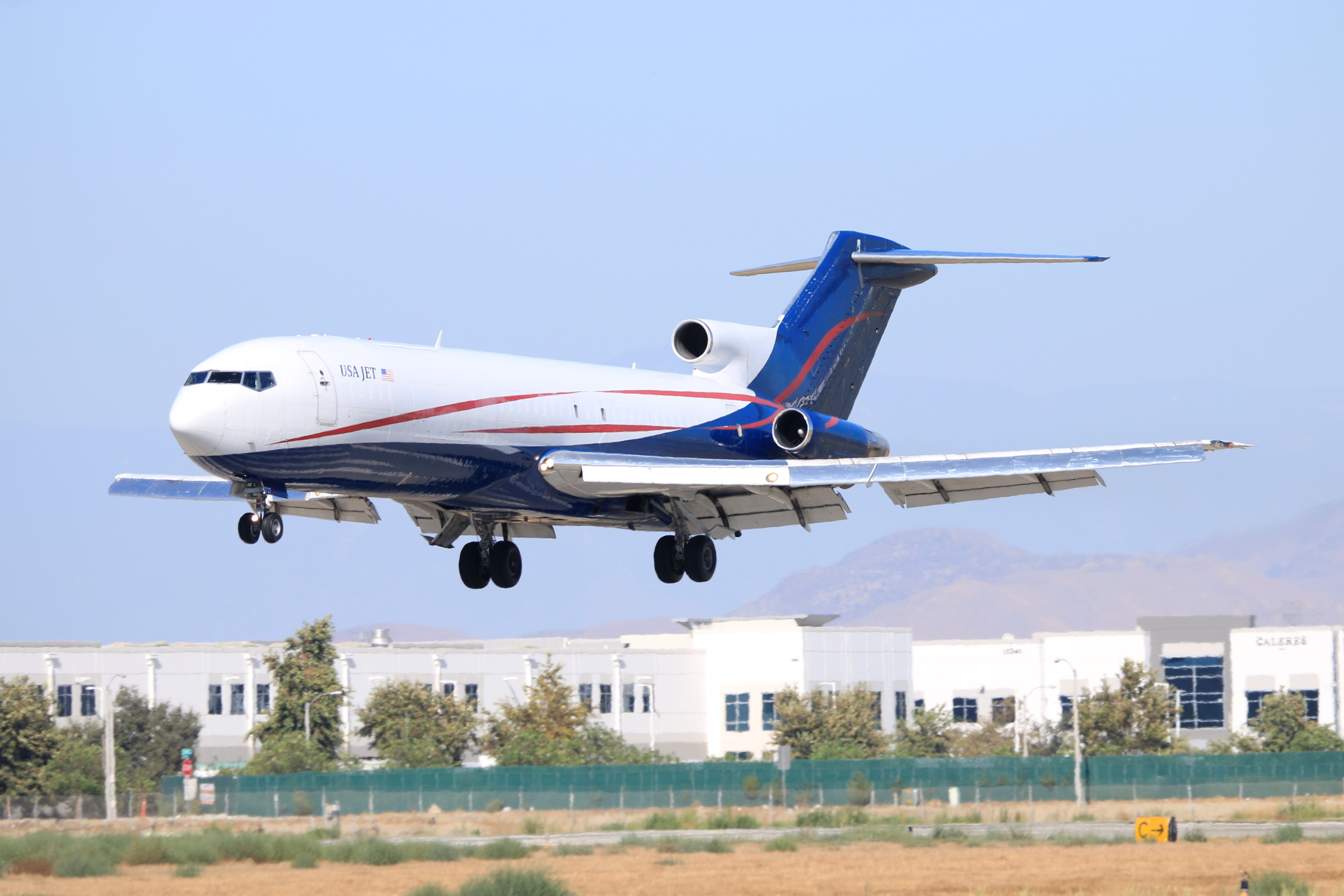
A Boeing 727-223F(Adv) of USA Jet Airlines on final approach to Chino Airport.

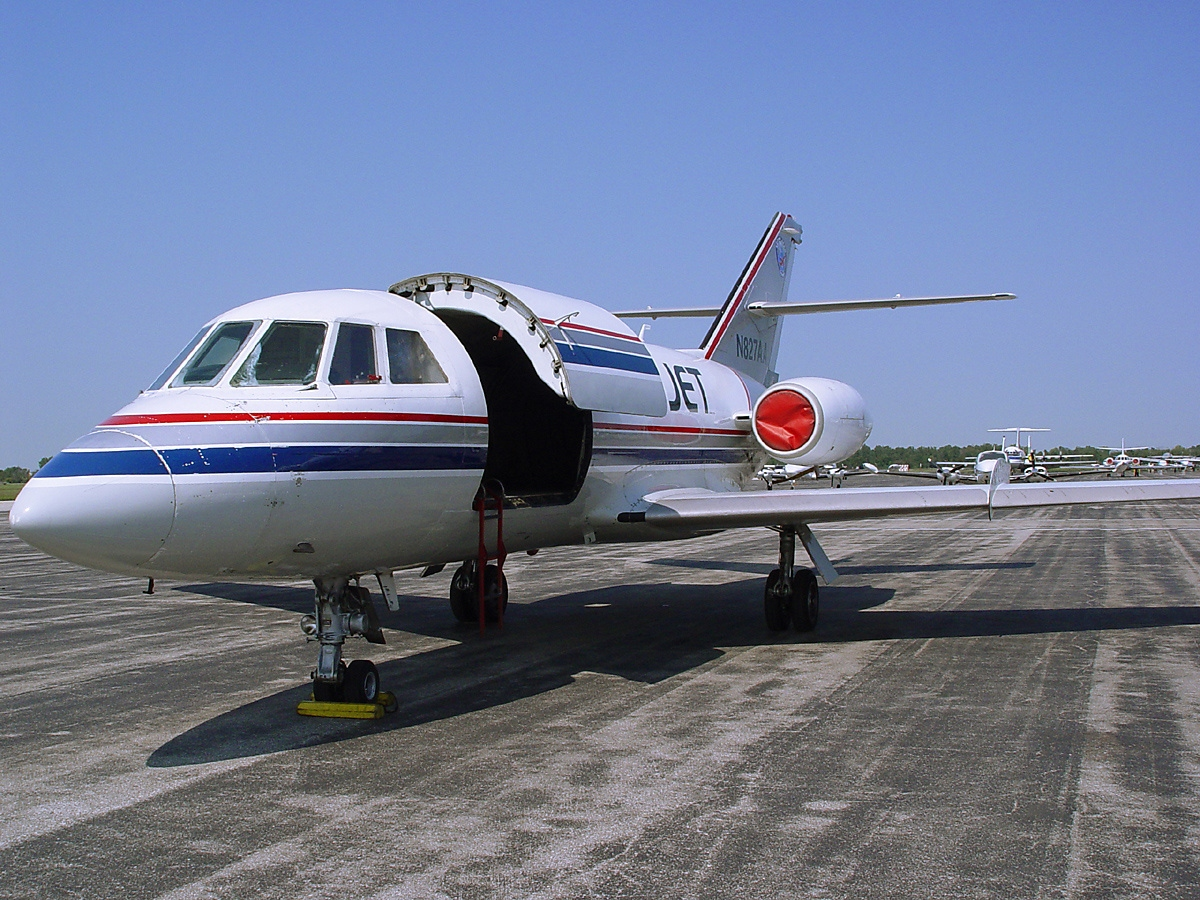
A Dassault Falcon FA-20 in one of the older liveries of USA Jet Airlines.

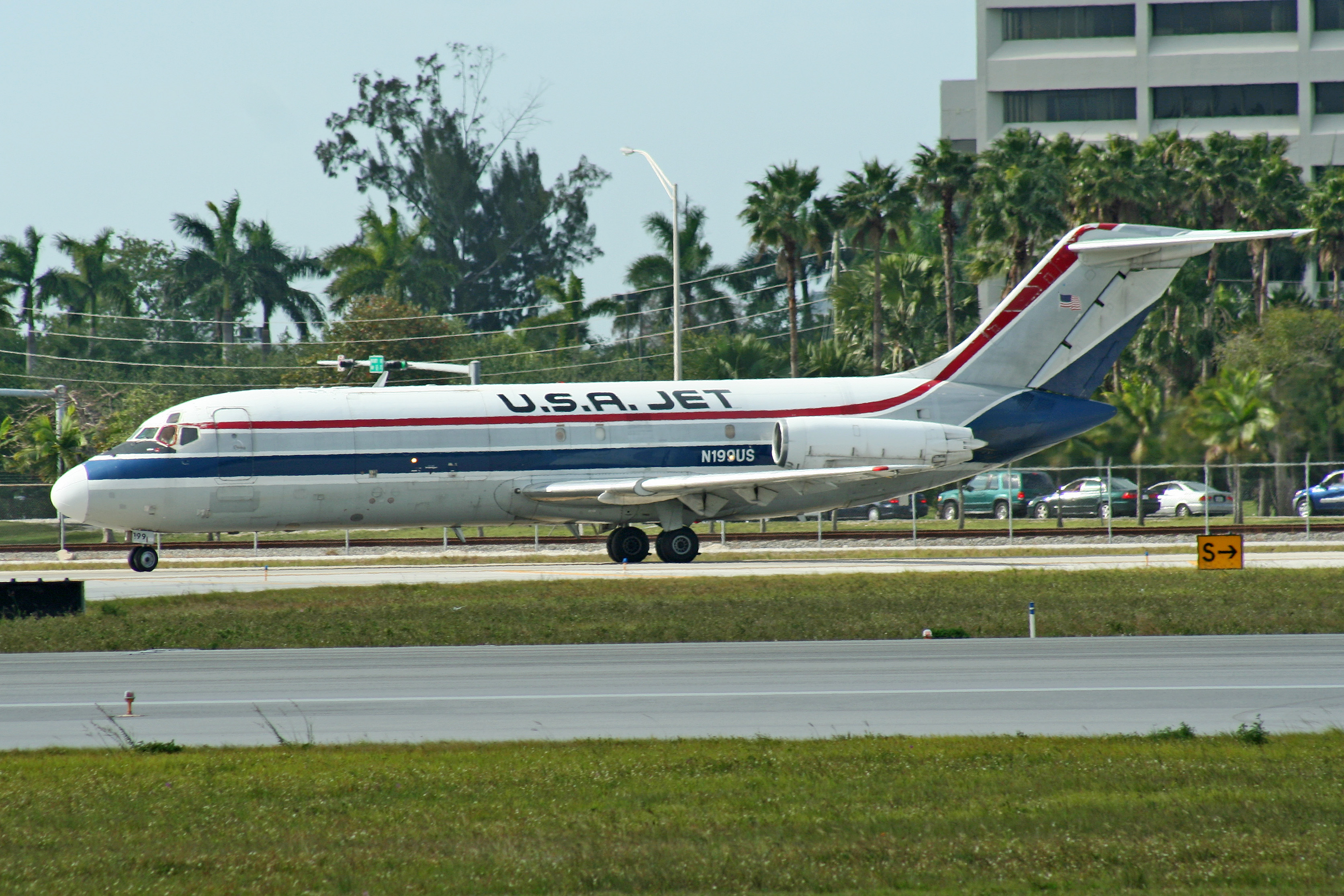
A USA Jet DC-9-15F At Miami International Airport taxiing for takeoff in 2008, this would later crash as USA Jet Airlines Flight 199.

USA Jet Airlines is an American cargo airline with its headquarters on the grounds of Willow Run Airport, and in Van Buren Township, Michigan. USA Jet operates on-demand air charter freight, and formerly passenger flights out of Willow Run Airport. USA Jet Airlines is a division of Ascent Global Logistics (formerly Active Aero Group).

== History ==
In August 2013, USA Jet Airlines became the world's first operator of an MD-80 Passenger-to-Freighter conversion. The aircraft, converted by Aeronautical Engineers, Inc., competes against the Boeing 727 in the cargo market. In February 2023, USA Jet retired the last three of their McDonnell Douglas DC-9 fleet.

== Fleet ==
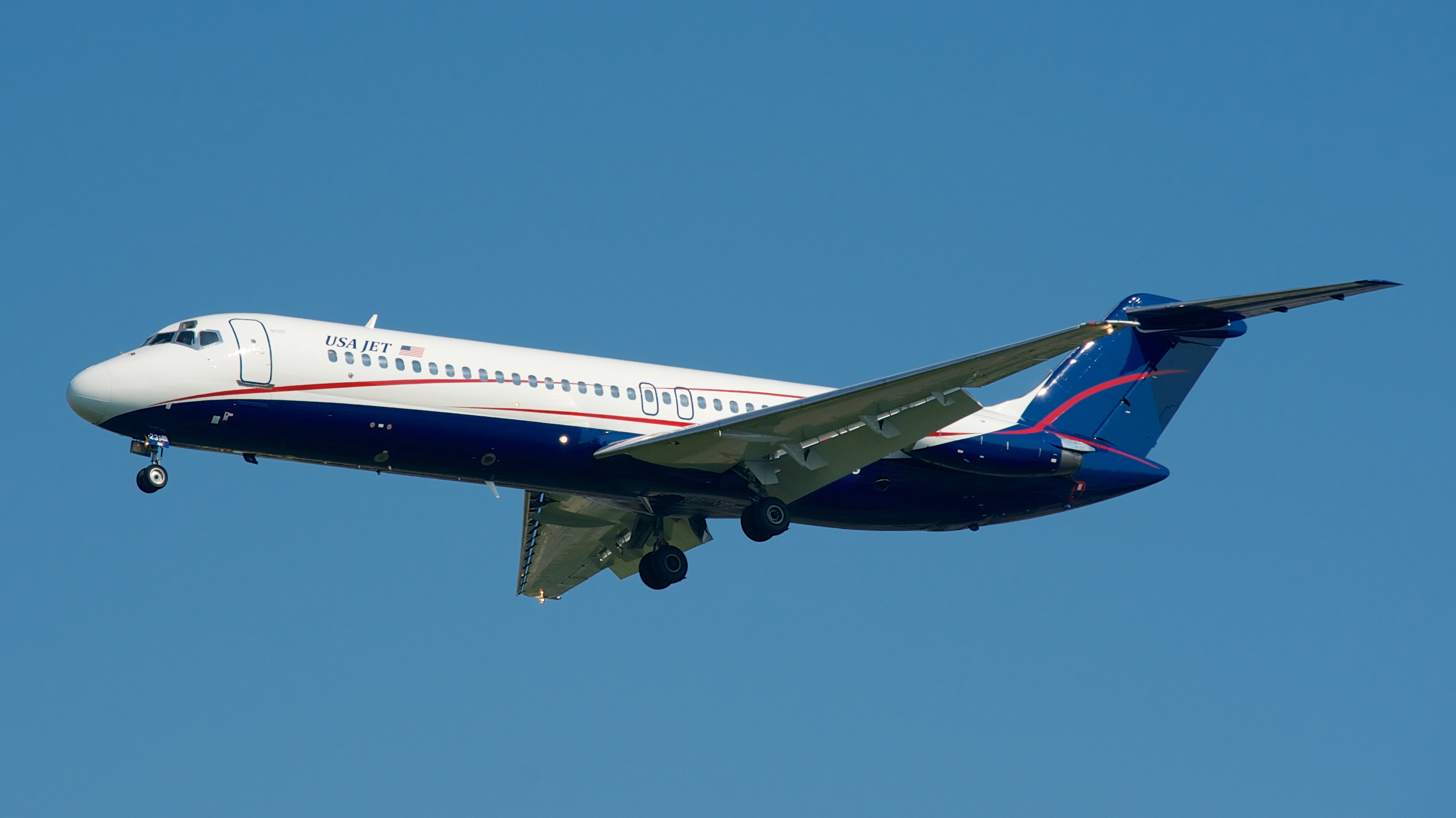
A former USA Jet McDonnell Douglas DC-9 (2012)

=== Current fleet ===
As of December 2025, the USA Jet Airlines fleet included the following aircraft:

Aircraft	In Fleet	Orders	Notes
McDonnell Douglas MD-88SF	8	—	
McDonnell Douglas MD-83SF	1	—	
Boeing 727-200F	2	—	
Dassault Falcon 20	4	—	All have been parked at Willow Run Airport since 2024.
Total	15	—	

=== Historic fleet ===
USA Jet Airlines previously also operated the following aircraft:

Aircraft	Number	Notes
McDonnell Douglas MD-83	1	Converted to Freighter
McDonnell Douglas DC-9-15RC	1	Converted to Freighter
McDonnell Douglas DC-9-31	3	

== Accidents and incidents ==
- On September 1, 2005, a Falcon 20 struck a flock of mourning doves shortly after rotation at Lorain County, Ohio, causing both engines to flame out. As the gear was retracted, the plane crashed beyond the runway and was destroyed after impact. The crew suffered minor injuries.
- On July 8, 2008, a DC-9-15F (N199US) crashed onto a roadway while approaching the Plan de Guadalupe International Airport in Saltillo, Mexico while on a scheduled cargo flight from the U.S. The National Transportation Safety Board, which confirmed the death of the pilot, reported no one was injured on the ground. The co-pilot suffered severe burns. Flight 199 departed Detroit-Willow Run Airport, MI (YIP) on July 5 for Hamilton (YHM), Canada to pick up cargo. Automotive parts were loaded on board and the flight continued to Shreveport (SHV) where it arrived at 23:19 CDT. After clearing customs it took off again at 23:48 CDT, bound for Saltillo (SLW), Mexico. The DC-9 crashed in an industrial area 800 m north of the airport. The airplane broke up and burned.

== Trivia ==
- A USA Jet Airlines McDonnell Douglas DC-9 was used for the filming of the movie Cedar Rapids and another painted for We Are Marshall.
