= List of museums and collections at the University of Michigan =

The University of Michigan in Ann Arbor is home to a number of museums.

Located on the university's Central Campus are University of Michigan Museum of Natural History; the University of Michigan Museum of Art; the Kelsey Museum of Archaeology; Sindecuse Museum of Dentistry of the School of Dentistry. Adjacent to the Central Campus is the Nichols Arboretum and Matthaei Botanical Gardens.

Located on the university's North Campus is the Warren Robbins Gallery and Slusser Gallery of the Penny W. Stamps School of Art & Design and the Stearns Collection of Musical Instruments of the School of Music, Theatre & Dance.

== Central Campus ==
=== University of Michigan Museum of Natural History ===
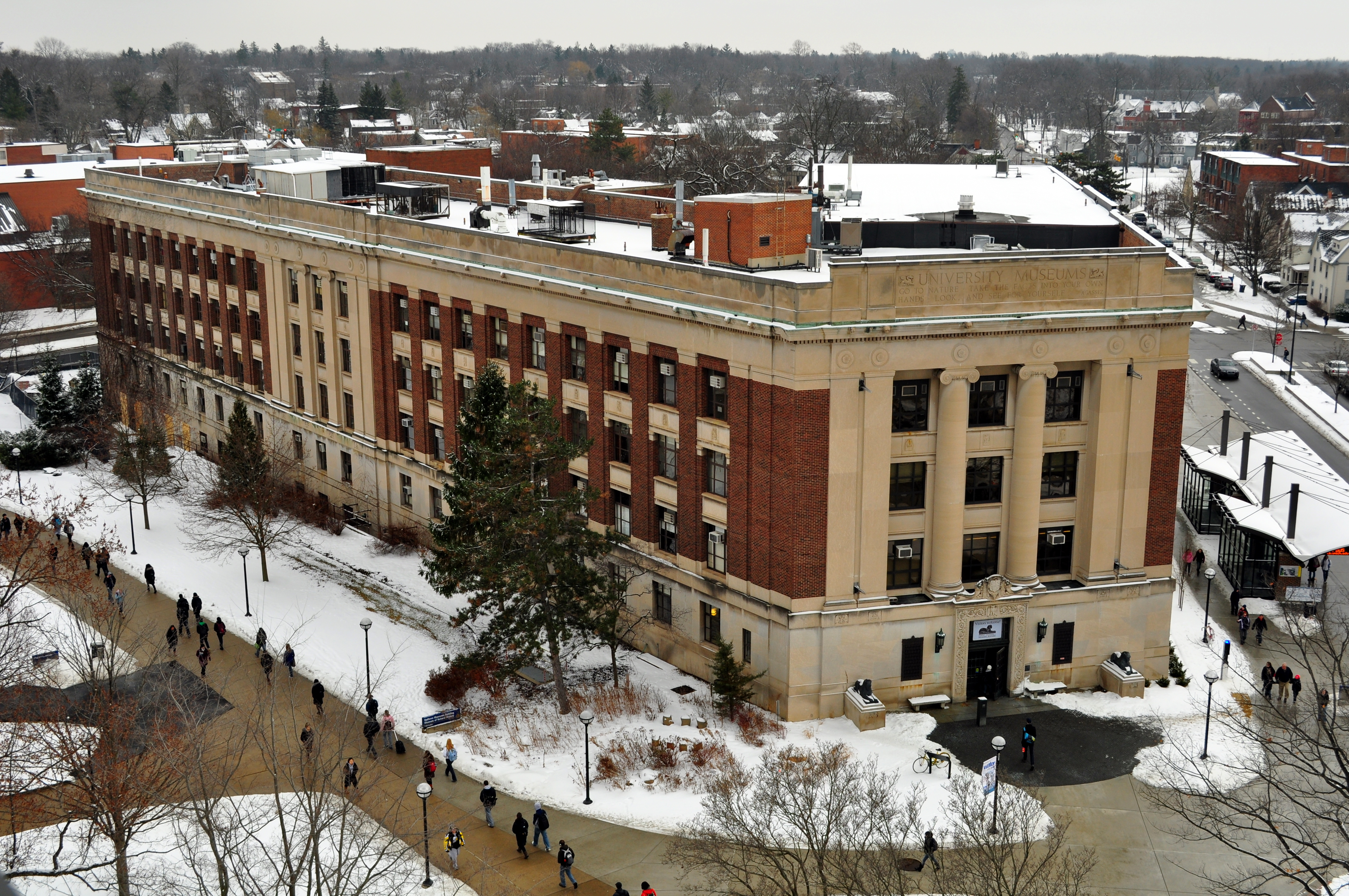
The former Alexander G. Ruthven Museums Building on Central Campus, looking towards the northeast

The University of Michigan Museum of Natural History, formerly known as the Exhibit Museum of Natural History, began in the mid-19th century and expanded greatly with the donation of 60,000 specimens by Joseph Beal Steere, a U-M alumnus, in the 1870s. The museum holds the largest display of dinosaur specimens in Michigan, as well as specimens of the state fossil, the mastodon (the only such display in the world containing adult male and female specimens: the Buesching and Owosso mastodons).

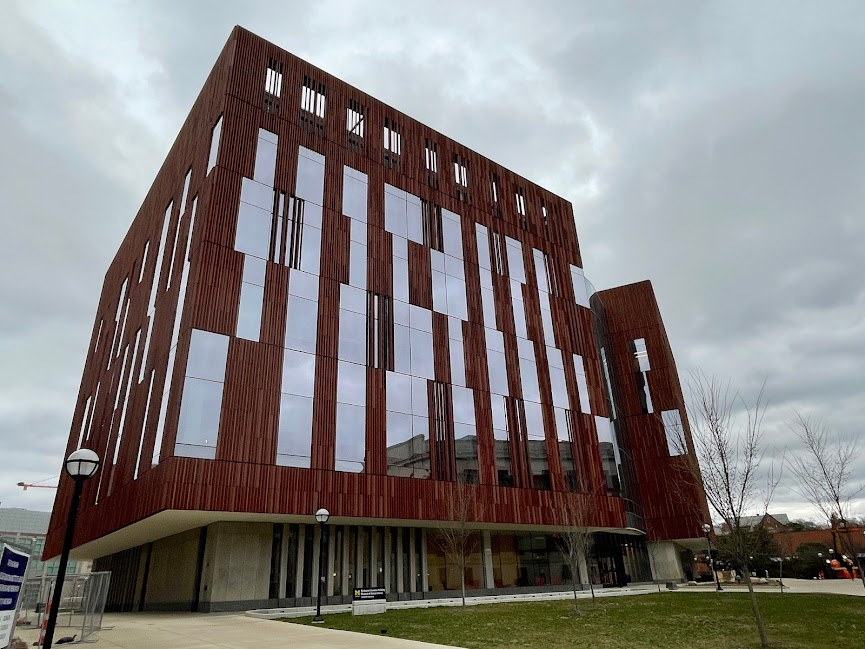
U-M Biological Sciences Building that houses the Museum of Natural History, Darwin's Cafe, and several departments. Situated across the street from the previous Ruthven Museums Building. Image taken April 2022.

The museum was formerly housed in the Alexander G. Ruthven Museums Building and was recently moved into the new Biological Sciences Building. The Museum of Natural History includes a planetarium and exhibits on geology, paleontology in Michigan and beyond, Michigan wildlife, Native American culture and anthropology. The exhibit displays include material borrowed from the other U-M museums, which are all different departmental units.

=== Kelsey Museum of Archaeology ===
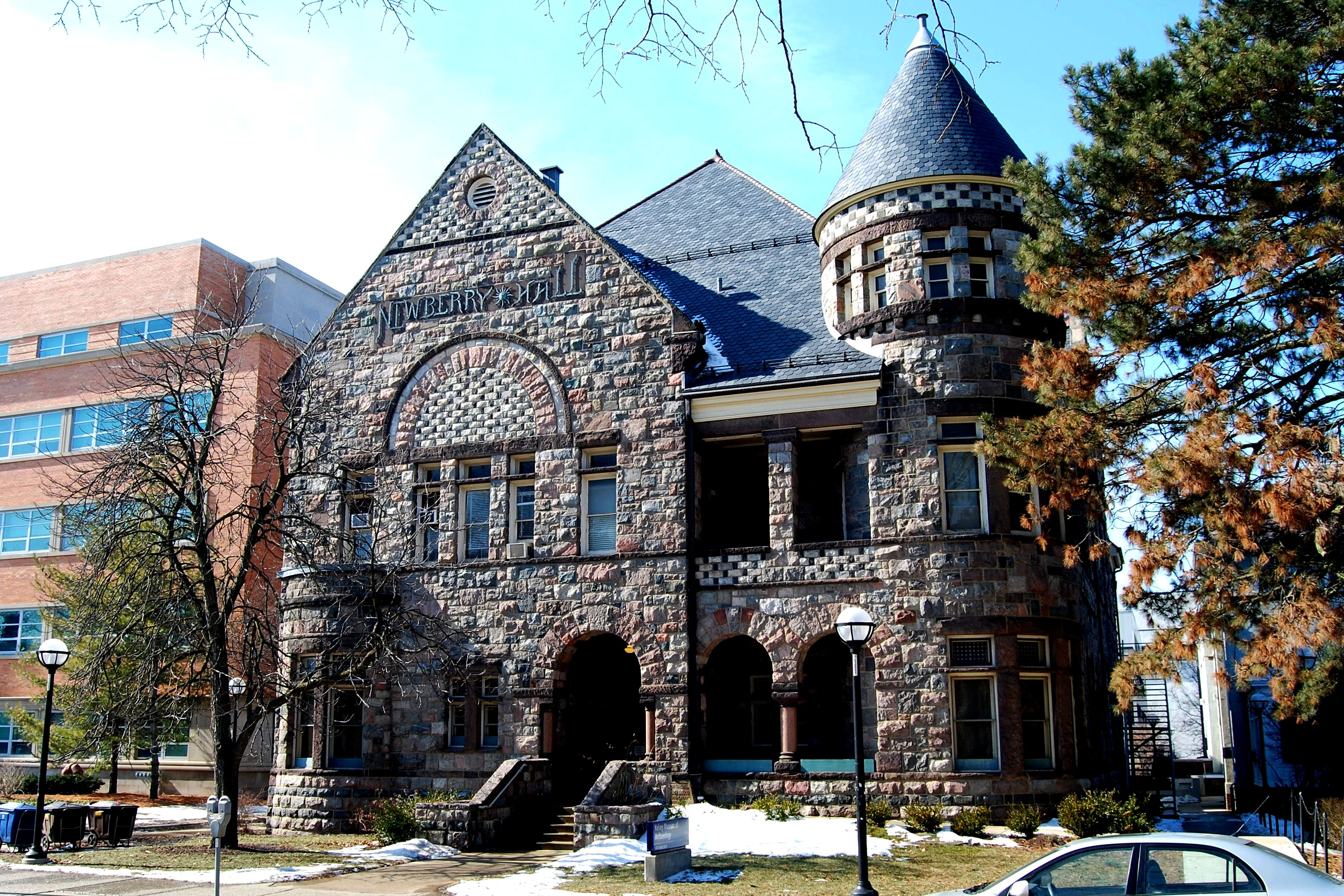
Kelsey Museum

Another museum located on Central Campus is the Kelsey Museum of Archeology, which has a collection of Roman, Greek, Egyptian, and Middle Eastern artifacts. Between 1972 and 1974, the museum was involved in the excavation of the archaeological site of Dibsi Faraj in northern Syria. The Kelsey Museum re-opened November 1, 2009 after a renovation and expansion.

=== University of Michigan Museum of Art ===
The University of Michigan Museum of Art (UMMA) is a meeting place for the arts, bridging visual art and contemporary culture, scholarship and accessibility, tradition and innovation. The museum's collections include nearly 19,000 objects that span cultures, eras, and media and include European, American, Middle Eastern, Asian, and African art, as well as changing exhibits. The Museum of Art re-opened in 2009 after a three-year renovation and expansion. UMMA presents special exhibitions and diverse educational programs featuring the visual, performing, film and literary arts that contextualize the gallery experience.

=== Sindecuse Museum of Dentistry ===
Also on Central Campus and housed in the School of Dentistry building is the Sindecuse Museum of Dentistry. The collection contains over 15,000 objects pertaining to the history of the dental profession.

=== Nichols Arboretum ===
Nichols Arboretum is a 123-acre site adjacent to Central Campus. The entrance from campus is on Washington Heights near the University Hospital complex. The ceremonial entrance is on Geddes Road.

== Medical and North Campuses ==
=== Detroit Observatory ===
The Detroit Observatory is adjacent to the University Hospital complex. Containing two telescopes, it was the first observatory in Michigan and the second in Midwest, and is the second oldest building remaining on campus. The Nichols Arboretum is also adjacent to the University Hospital complex.

=== Warren Robbins Gallery and Slusser Gallery ===
The Warren Robbins Gallery and Slusser Gallery are art exhibit galleries housed in the Penny W. Stamps School of Art & Design building on North Campus.

=== Stearns Collection of Musical Instruments ===
The Stearns Collection of Musical Instruments, located in the Earl V. Moore Building of the School of Music, Theatre & Dance, houses over 2,500 pieces of historical and contemporary musical instruments from all over the world.

== Off-campus ==
=== Matthaei Botanical Gardens ===
The Matthaei Botanical Gardens, is a 350-acre facility located on the eastern boundary of Ann Arbor, about 10 km from campus. It is another major collection of the university.

=== University of Michigan Herbarium ===
The University of Michigan Herbarium, a research and teaching collection comprising over 1.7 million botanical specimens, is located south of the main campus.

=== Museum of Anthropology ===
The Museum of Anthropology is a research, teaching, and curation unit of the College of Literature, Science and Arts for anthropological and archaeological collections from around the world. The collections support undergraduate and graduate education, and a portion are displayed in the U-M Museum of Natural History. The Museum of Anthropology formally started in 1922. The Museum of Anthropology is open to researchers, classes and members of the public by appointment.

=== Museum of Paleontology ===
The Museum of Paleontology (UMMP) is a research museum illuminating the history and meaning of life through geological time. The Museum of Paleontology collections are located at the Research Museum Center and other departmental offices are in the Biological Sciences Building (where the Museum of Natural History is located). The Museum of Paleontology is open to researchers by appointment only.

=== Museum of Zoology ===
The Museum of Zoology (UMMZ), whose collection includes over 15 million specimens representing all orders of birds, amphibians and reptiles, mites, and insects, and over 80% of orders of fish and mollusks.

=== Horner-McLaughlin Woods ===
This 90 acre research natural area is managed by the Matthaei Botanical Gardens. It was donated to the University of Michigan by the Michigan Botanical Club in 1964 as a plant and wildflower sanctuary for scientific, educational and aesthetic purposes. Public parking and trail-head access is through the Raymond F. Goodrich Preserve, Washtenaw County Parks and Recreation.

=== Mud Lake Bog ===
This 260 acre research natural area is managed by the Matthaei Botanical Gardens. It is at the northern edge of Washtenaw County, Michigan, about 20 km from Ann Arbor. Access is restricted and granted through permission of the Gardens.

== See also ==
- University of Michigan Library
- Ann Arbor Hands-On Museum
- List of university museums in the United States
