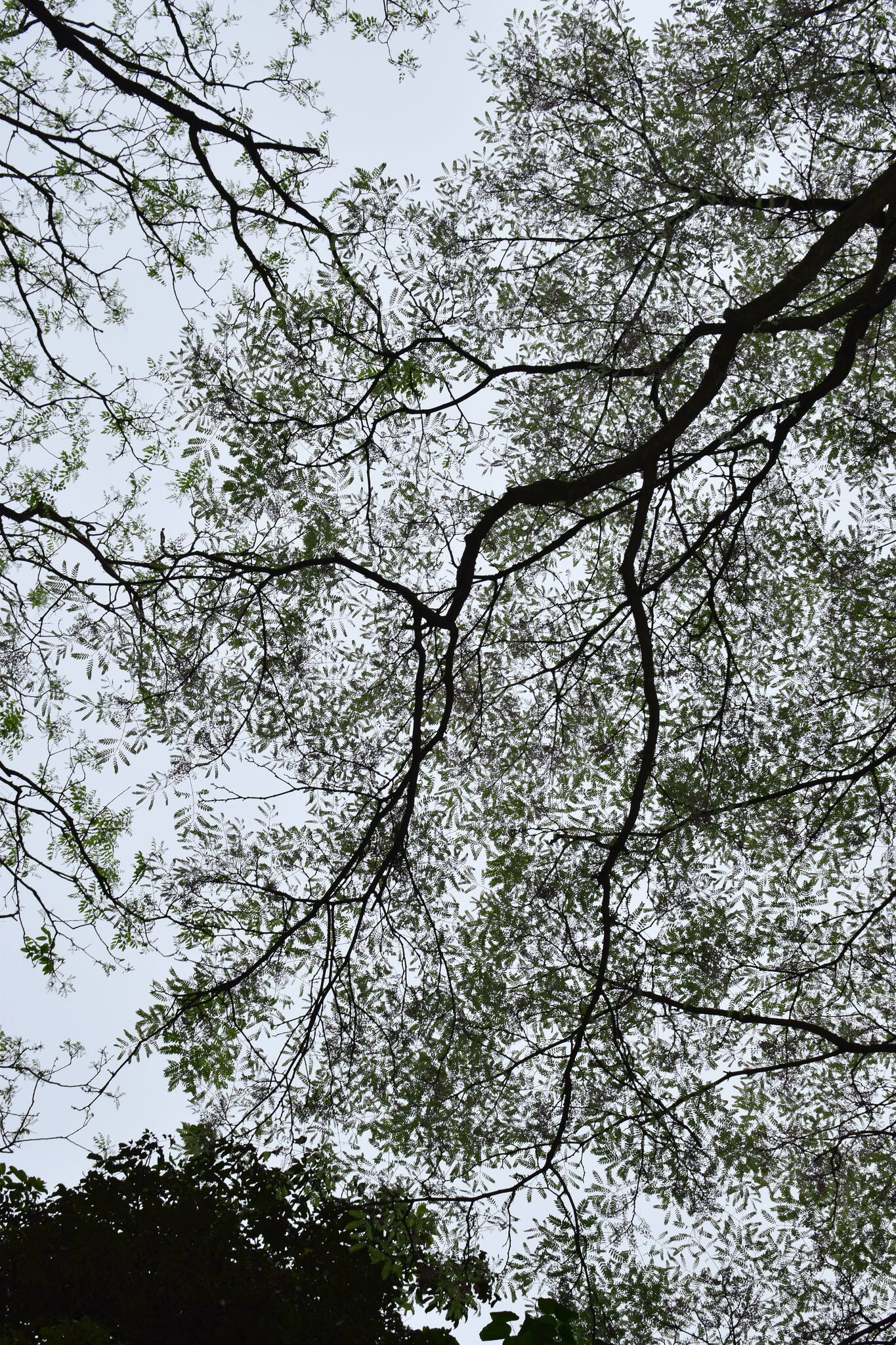
- In Hangzhou Botanical Garden, China

Conservation status
- Least Concern (IUCN 3.1)

Scientific classification
- Kingdom: Plantae
- Clade: Tracheophytes
- Clade: Angiosperms
- Clade: Eudicots
- Clade: Rosids
- Order: Fabales
- Family: Fabaceae
- Subfamily: Caesalpinioideae
- Genus: Gymnocladus
- Species: G. chinensis

Binomial name
- Gymnocladus chinensis Baill.

Synonyms
- Gymnocladus guangxiensis P.C.Huang & Q.W.Yao

= Gymnocladus chinensis =

Species of legume

Gymnocladus chinensis, the soap tree or Chinese coffeetree, is a tree in the subfamily Caesalpinioideae of the pea family Fabaceae. It is native to central China and maybe the Eastern Himalayas also. Its leaves are large and bipinnate, and its leaflets begin purple then shade to green.
