= Shakespeare in the Arb =

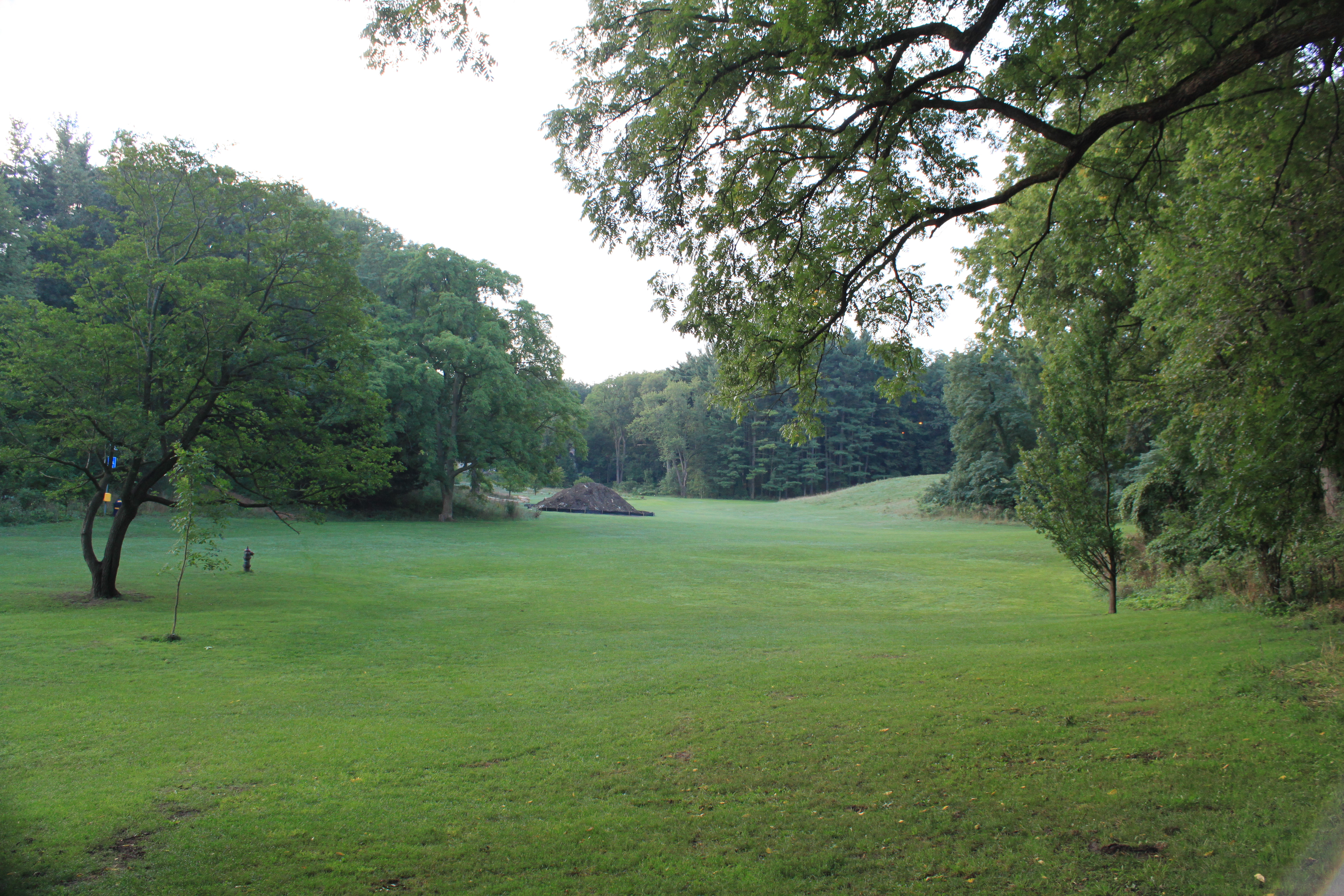
- Location: Ann Arbor, Michigan
- Founded: 2001
- Founded by: Inger Schultz, Kate Mendeloff
- Artistic director: Kate Mendeloff (2001-2023) Carol Gray Graham Atkin
- Type of play: Shakespeare
- Festival date: June
- Website: https://mbgna.umich.edu/shakespeare-arb

Shakespeare in the Arb is an annual event, presented in the open, in Nichols Arboretum. Nichols Arboretum is a 123-acre (49.7 hectares) heavily wooded park, with large landscape lawns surrounded by woods, the Huron River, and steep hills. The plays are moving events, with both performers and audience moving from location to location within the park as the play progresses. At each location, a segment of the play is performed. The plays begin in the early evening, and are put on near the summer solstice, as no artificial lighting is used.

The park is near to the University of Michigan and downtown Ann Arbor.

== History ==
Shakespeare in the Arb was founded in 2001 by Inger Schultz and Kate Mendeloff. Mendeloff was the artistic director from its inception until her death in 2023. Carol Gray and Graham Atkin now serve as artistic and production directors.

== Performances ==
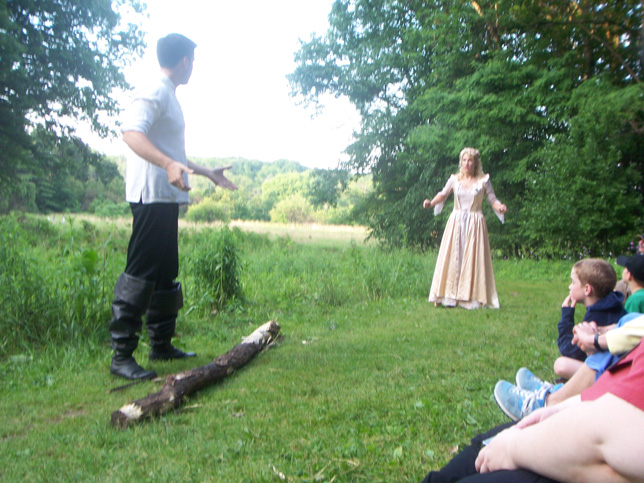
The Tempest being performed in 2007

Each year one play is presented. Performances take place every weekend in June, from Thursday through Sunday. They begin at 6:30 p.m. local time (EDT), and run for about 2.5 hours. The production travels from spot to spot within the arboretum to create the different scenes. "As one critic commented, 'The actors used the vastness of its Arb[oretum] stage to full advantage, making entrances from behind trees, appearing over rises and vanishing into the woods.'"

The arboretum is a public park, situated in the center of an urban area, next to a railroad track, and a large medical center. Because of this, performances can be interrupted by trains, medevac helicopters, and other park visitors. The weather is a factor, with large rainstorms always possible.

== Reception ==
Since the beginning of its second season, Shakespeare in the Arb has sold out nearly every performance. Originally, tickets were sold on the day of the performances, and were first-come, first-served. Since 2022, tickets have been sold through the Michigan Union Ticket Office.

== A Midsummer Night's Dream ==
The first play presented by Shakespeare in the Arb, which has been repeated approximately every 5 years since, is A Midsummer Night's Dream. The play—with its natural setting, structure, and language—is perfect for presenting in the arboretum, which features dense heavy woods with mature trees, large lawns, steep hills, and a river. In 2022, A Midsummer Night's Dream was presented for the fourth time since the festival began.
