= Gymnocladus burmanicus =

Scientific classification
- Kingdom: Plantae
- Clade: Tracheophytes
- Clade: Angiosperms
- Clade: Eudicots
- Clade: Rosids
- Order: Fabales
- Family: Fabaceae
- Subfamily: Caesalpinioideae
- Genus: Gymnocladus
- Species: G. burmanicus

Binomial name
- Gymnocladus burmanicus Baill.

Species of legume

Gymnocladus burmanicus or Dekang tree is a tree in the subfamily Caesalpinioideae of the pea family Fabaceae, native to India.
