= Nichols Arboretum =

Arboretum at the University of Michigan campus

- The Arb
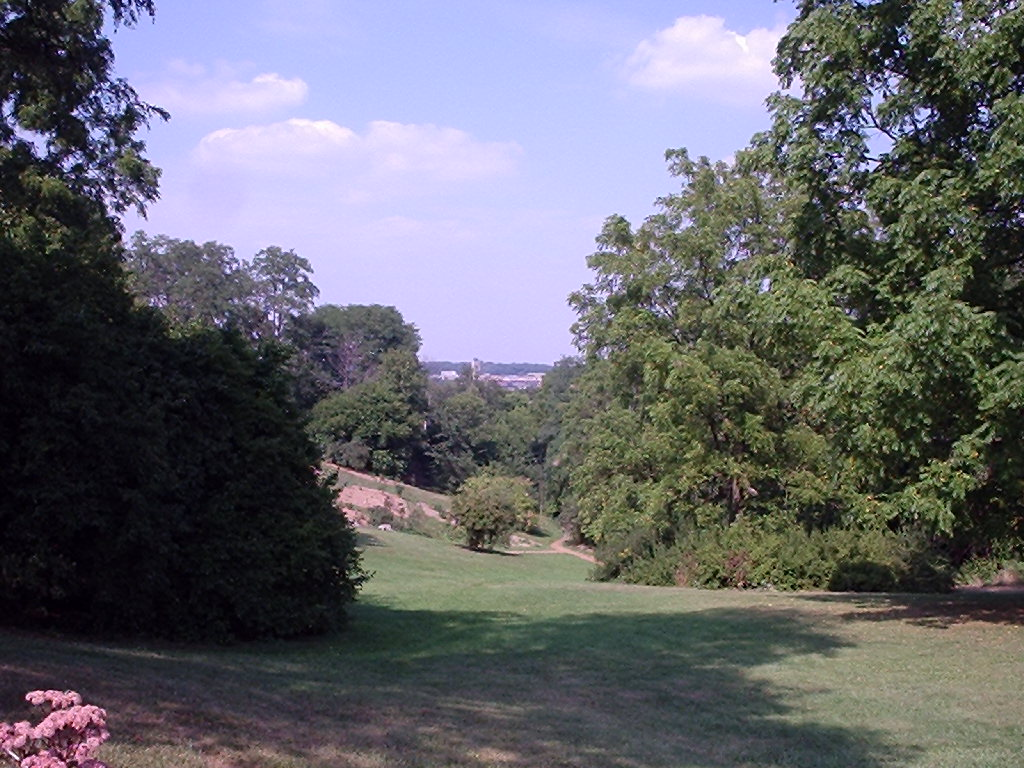
- View of the Main Valley, showing a subtly designed "long view" of the surrounding landscape
- Interactive map of Nichols Arboretum
- Location: Ann Arbor, Michigan
- Coordinates: 42.28131°N 83.72329°W
- Area: 128 acres (52 ha)
- Operator: University of Michigan
- Website: mbgna.umich.edu/nichols-arboretum

Nichols Arboretum, locally known as the Arb, is an arboretum on the campus of the University of Michigan, in Ann Arbor, Michigan. The Arb is located adjacent to the Huron River, and features over 400 species, including 110 species of trees, in a varied, hilly landscape. A signature feature of Nichols Arboretum is the W. E. Upjohn Peony Garden, which features the largest collection of heirloom peonies in North America.

Nichols Arboretum was designed by noted American landscape gardener and University of Michigan alumnus O. C. Simonds, and opened in 1907. The 128-acre (52 ha) arboretum is named for Esther Connor Nichols and her husband Walter, who donated part of the land for the arboretum in 1906.

== History ==
Plans drawn for the original campus of the University of Michigan, dating back to the 1830s, showed the university's desire for a large botanical garden on the main campus. These plans were never implemented, and the first botanical garden at the university was not established until 1897.

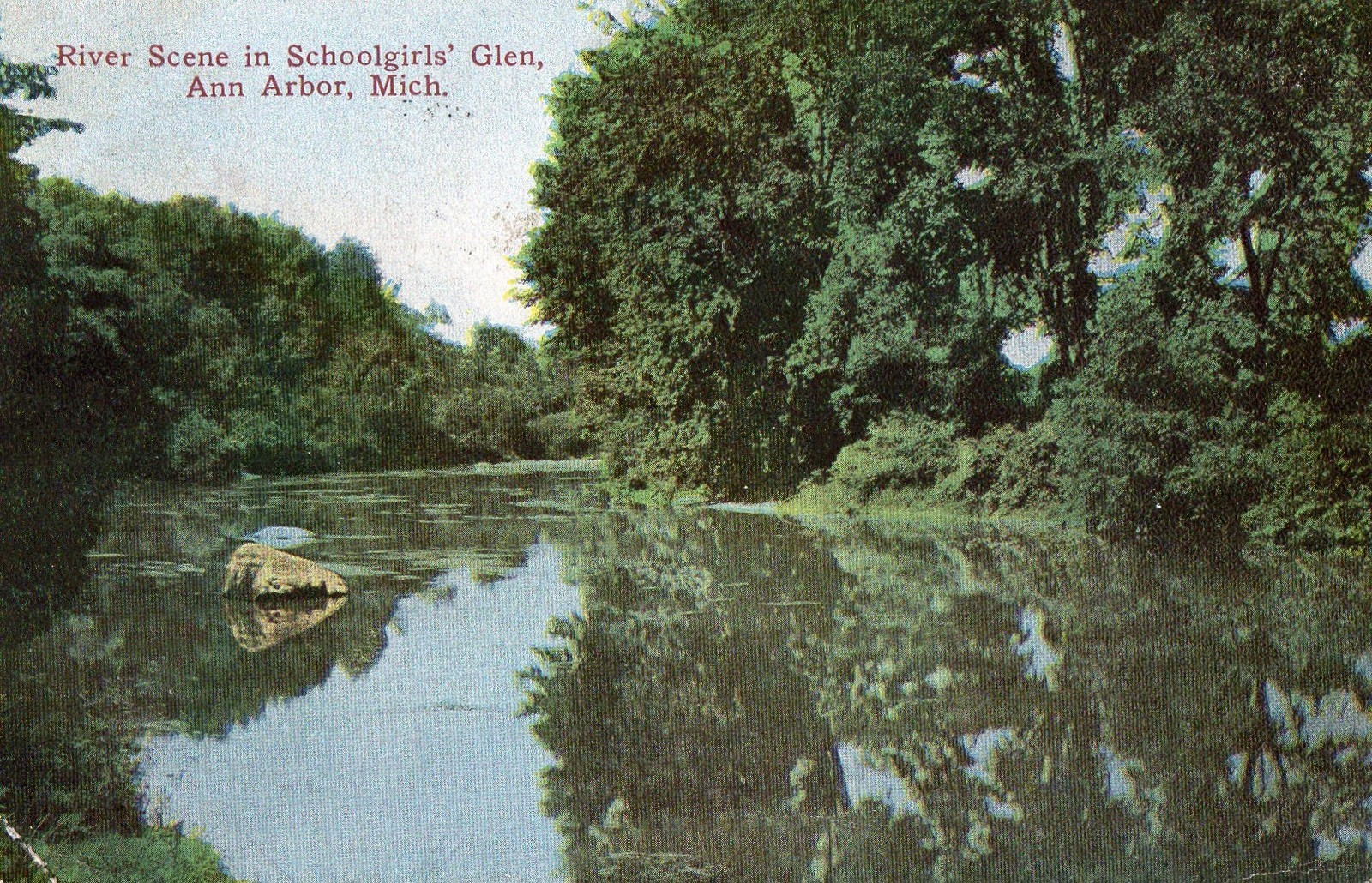
Postcard of Schoolgirls' Glen, ca. 1918

A deep ravine, leading down from Forest Hill Cemetery to the Huron River, was left undeveloped as the surrounding land was converted to farmland in the 19th century. By the 1850s, the ravine was referred to as "Schoolgirls' Glen," likely for the pupils of a girls' school who gathered flowers there. Schoolgirls' Glen became popular as a retreat for university students, due to its location close to campus. The glen's beauty inspired an 1875 anonymous opinion piece in a student newspaper, which read in part that “no person with any poetry in his soul can walk from the second railroad bridge north to Schoolgirls’ Glen without rhyming all the way.”

The City of Ann Arbor formed a parks commission in 1905, headed by university botany professor George C. Burns. In one of its first property acquisitions, the parks commission purchased part of Schoolgirls' Glen from the Mummery family in July 1906. Months later, Esther and Walter Nichols donated their adjacent 27-acre (11 ha) farm to the university, with the stipulation that it be used as a botanical garden. The city and the university reached an agreement shortly afterwards, proposed by Burns, where the university would create and manage a botanical garden and arboretum on the combined land, and the city would build roads and provide policing. The arboretum opened to the public in 1907, with only limited improvements.

Initial plan for a botanical garden, dated 1906

Improvements to the arboretum began quickly, with plans drawn up by the Chicago-based firm of O. C. Simonds in 1906. Simonds' plans were subtle, using the existing natural landscape of the site. Simonds' design creates vanishing points in the landscape from the perspective of the park visitor, which he described as "long views." The largest example of the "long view" in the Arboretum is the Main Valley, a valley at the center of the property whose view leads to a tree-filled horizon. The signature feature of the "long view" is also present in Simonds' iconic designs in Chicago's Lincoln Park and Graceland Cemetery.

The new arboretum and botanical garden was popular with the public, but the university's botany faculty were displeased with the site. The hilly terrain prevented the construction of greenhouses for advanced plant research, and the botany faculty secured a site for a new botanical garden on Iroquois Road, south of the city, in 1914. Responsibility for the site was transferred to the landscape architecture faculty for use solely as an arboretum, and the site was officially named the Nichols Arboretum in 1922.

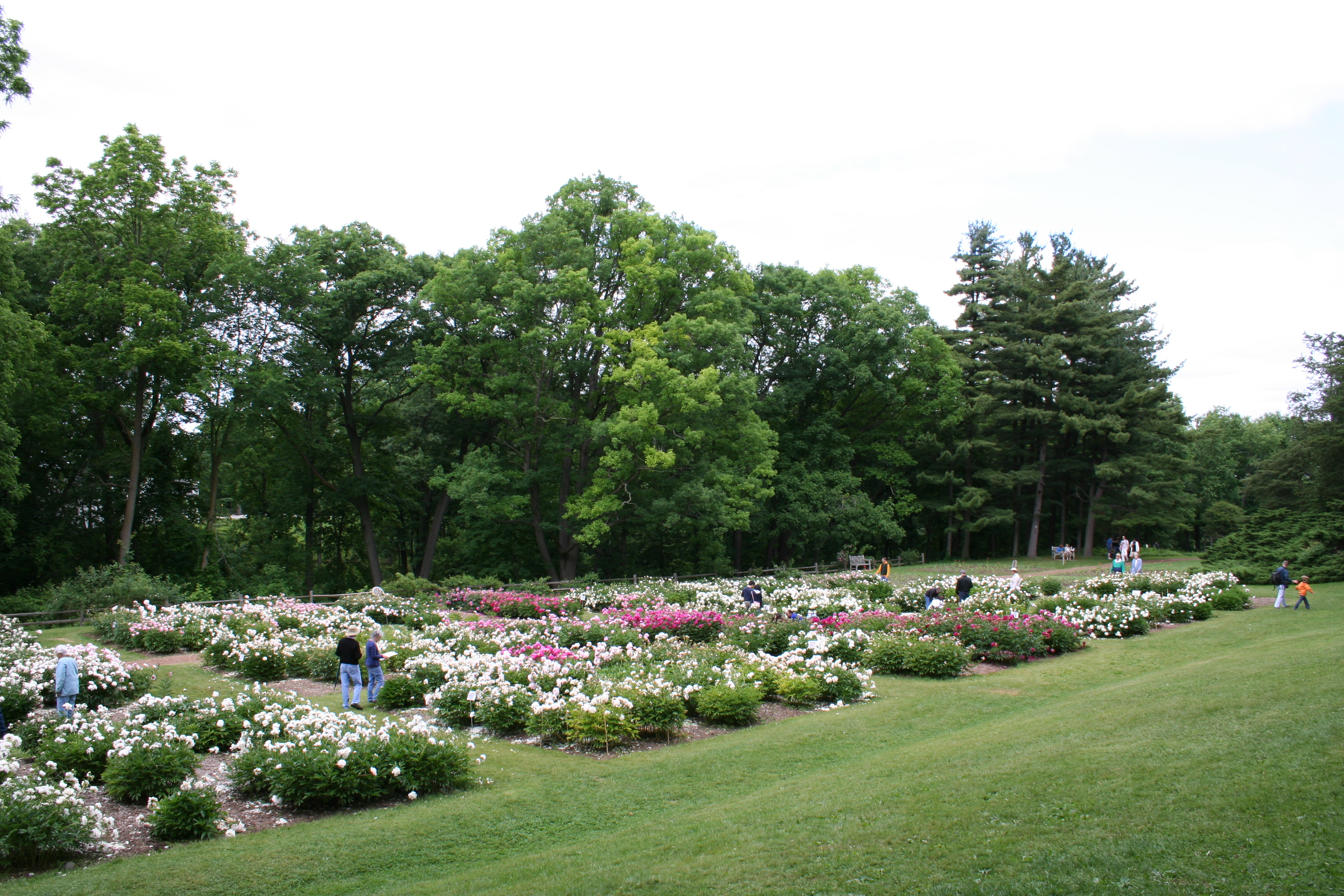
The Peony Garden in full bloom, shown in June 2011

University of Michigan Medical School alumnus William E. Upjohn donated his personal collection of peonies to the arboretum in 1922, and the collection formed the basis of a peony garden that opened in 1927. Of the 280 cultivars donated by Upjohn, 196 varieties survive a century later. Additions to the peony collection have made it the largest collection of heirloom peonies in North America, with approximately 350 cultivars, blooming in late May and early June.

Despite the continued popularity of the arboretum, the continuing development of the surrounding area began to cause conflict. In the 1920s and 1930s, the arboretum was proposed as the site of a new winter sports park. This proposal was countered under the administration of university president Alexander G. Ruthven in the mid-1930s, but further issues arose with the expansion of the university in the 1950s.

The expansion of the university, including the construction of Mary Markley Hall and the C.S. Mott Children's Hospital, and the further development of Forest Hill Cemetery, created large impervious surfaces uphill of the arboretum. This expansion greatly increased the runoff of rainwater through Schoolgirls' Glen. New storm drains emptied directly into the glen, sending soil into the Huron River and washing away plants. Inaction by the city, the university, and private landowners allowed the erosion to continue for decades, until erosion control measures were installed in the early 2000s.

Additional classroom and administrative space at the Arb was added in 1999, with the opening of the James D. Reader Jr. Urban Environmental Education Center. The education center is located in the historic Nathan Burnham House, which was built in 1837 in Ann Arbor's Lower Town neighborhood. The brick house was moved approximately 1 mile (1.6 km) north to the arboretum in February 1998, making way for an expansion of the Kellogg Eye Center.

Shakespeare in the Arb, an annual presentation of Shakespeare plays in the Arboretum, began in 2000, founded by University of Michigan Residential College drama professor Kate Mendeloff. Each scene is presented in a different location within the Arb, without the use of scenery or stage lighting, and with inevitable interruptions from wildlife, park visitors, weather, and the sounds of the nearby hospital. The first scene of each production is customarily presented in the Peony Garden while it is in full bloom. Mendeloff died in 2023, shortly before the opening of the program's 21st season.

The university's Matthaei Botanical Gardens, which moved out of the arboretum in the 1910s, and again to a larger site in 1960, were administratively reunited with the arboretum in 2004. The new Matthaei Botanical Gardens and Nichols Arboretum department manages the university's research forests and farms, and coordinates academic and cultural programming between the arboretum and the botanical gardens.

== Collection ==
=== Trees ===
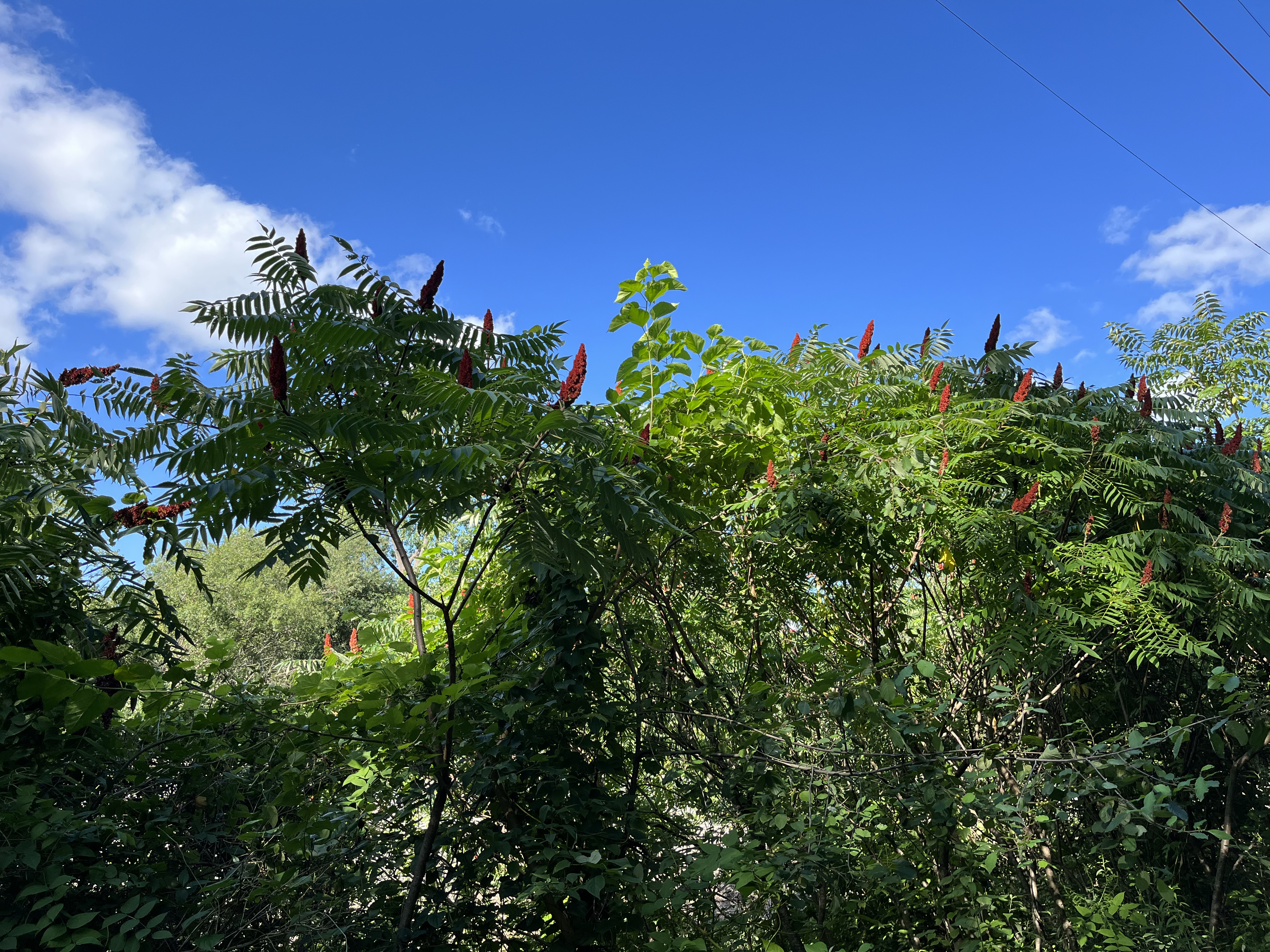
Rhus typhina flowers.

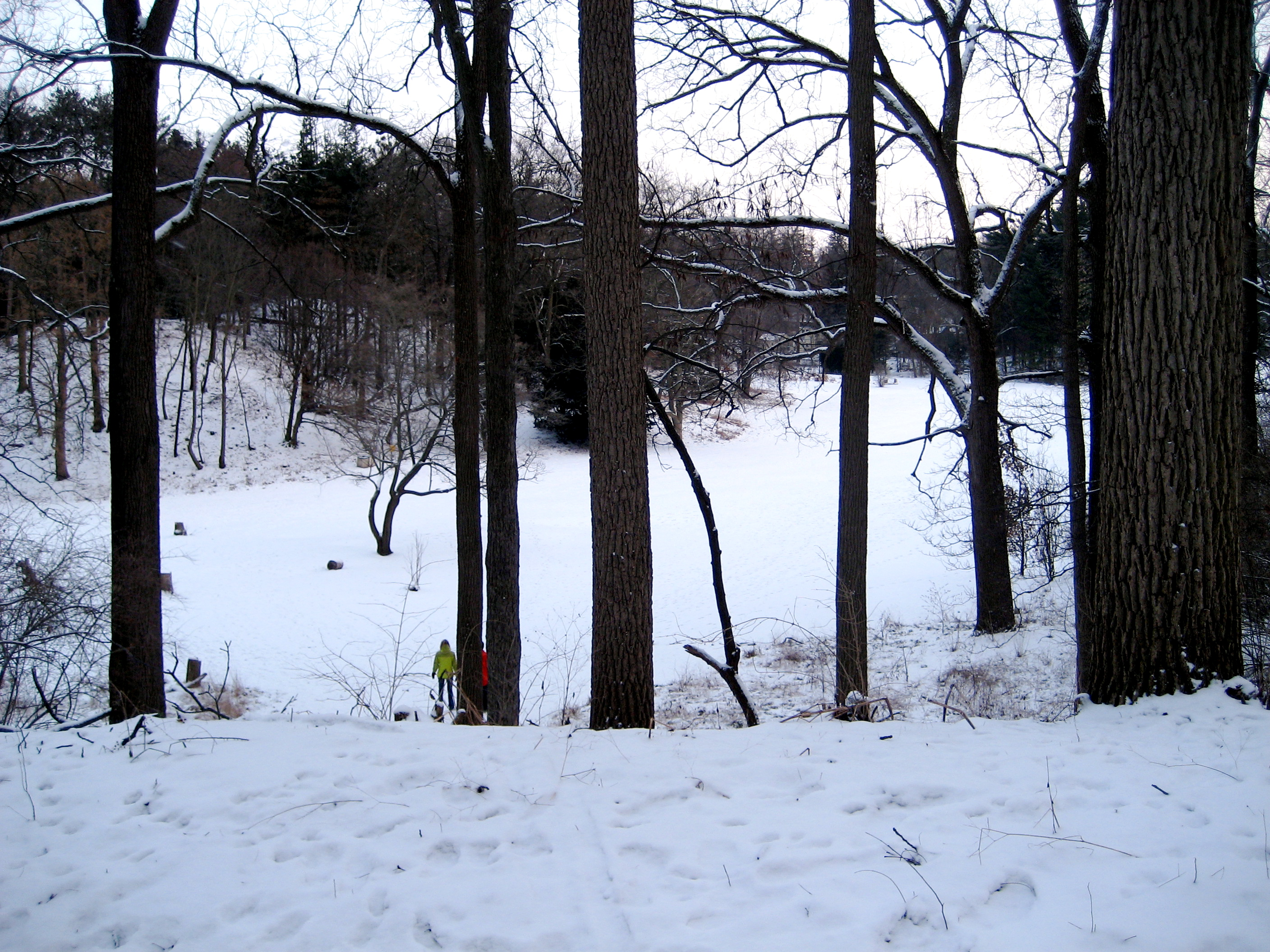
The arboretum after a fresh snow.

- Cedars of Lebanon (Cedrus libani) - four specimens, planted 1946, at the extreme edge of their cold hardiness range.
- Chinese Fringetree (Chionanthus retusus) - believed the oldest specimen of the species in the state.
- Ginkgo (Ginkgo biloba) - the oldest trees were planted before 1920.
- Conifers - planted primarily in the 1910s to 1930s. Many species of pine (Pinus), spruce (Picea) and fir (Abies), including ponderosa pine (Pinus ponderosa), lodgepole pine (Pinus rigida), Engelman spruce (Picea engelmannii), and Nordman fir (Abies nordmannii).
- Cupressaceae - four genera planted from the 1920s-1950s: junipers (Juniperus), arborvitae (Thuja and Platycladus) and false cypresses (Chamaecyparis).
- Hackberries (Cannabaceae) - several species of hackberries (Celtis spp.)
- Hawthorn - numerous hawthorn species, mostly from the 1920s are historically important and will be replaced.
- Korean Quasibark Tree (Picrasma quassioides) - possibly the only specimens in Michigan, planted 1933.
- Larches (Larix) - Japanese larches (Larix kaempferi) planted 1938, with a few European larches (Larix decidua) planted 1952.
- Legume (Fabaceae) - Eastern redbud (Cercis canadensis), American yellowwoods (Cladrastis kentukea), honeylocust (Gleditsia triacanthos), Kentucky coffeetree (Gymnocladus dioicus), black locust (Robinia pseudoacacia), and Japanese pagoda tree (Sophora japonica).
- Magnolias & Relatives - Fraser magnolias (Magnolia fraseri), umbrella magnolias (Magnolia tripetala), tuliptrees (Liriodendron tulipifera).
- Maples, Horse Chestnuts and Buckeyes - planted 1920s and 1930s. Species include Trefoil Maple (Acer cissifolium), Sycamore Maple (Acer pseudoplatanus) and Japanese Maple (Acer palmatum), as well as the genus Aesculus including Horsechestnuts and Buckeyes.
- Oaks - native oaks including red (Quercus rubra), white (Quercus alba), black (Quercus velutina), bur (Quercus macrocarpa), shingle (Quercus imbricaria), and swamp white (Quercus bicolor), as well as three Asian oaks representing sawtooth oak (Quercus acutissima) and oriental oak (Quercus variabilis).
- Turkish Hazelnut (Corylus colurna) - is thriving in the Main Valley
- Ulmaceae - American elms (Ulmus americana), European and Asian elms, Chinese elms (Ulmus parvifolia), and Japanese zelkovas (Zelkova serrata).
- White Pines (Pinus strobus) - about 150 eastern white pines were planted in 1952 and complement the much older stands throughout the Arb.

== Layout ==
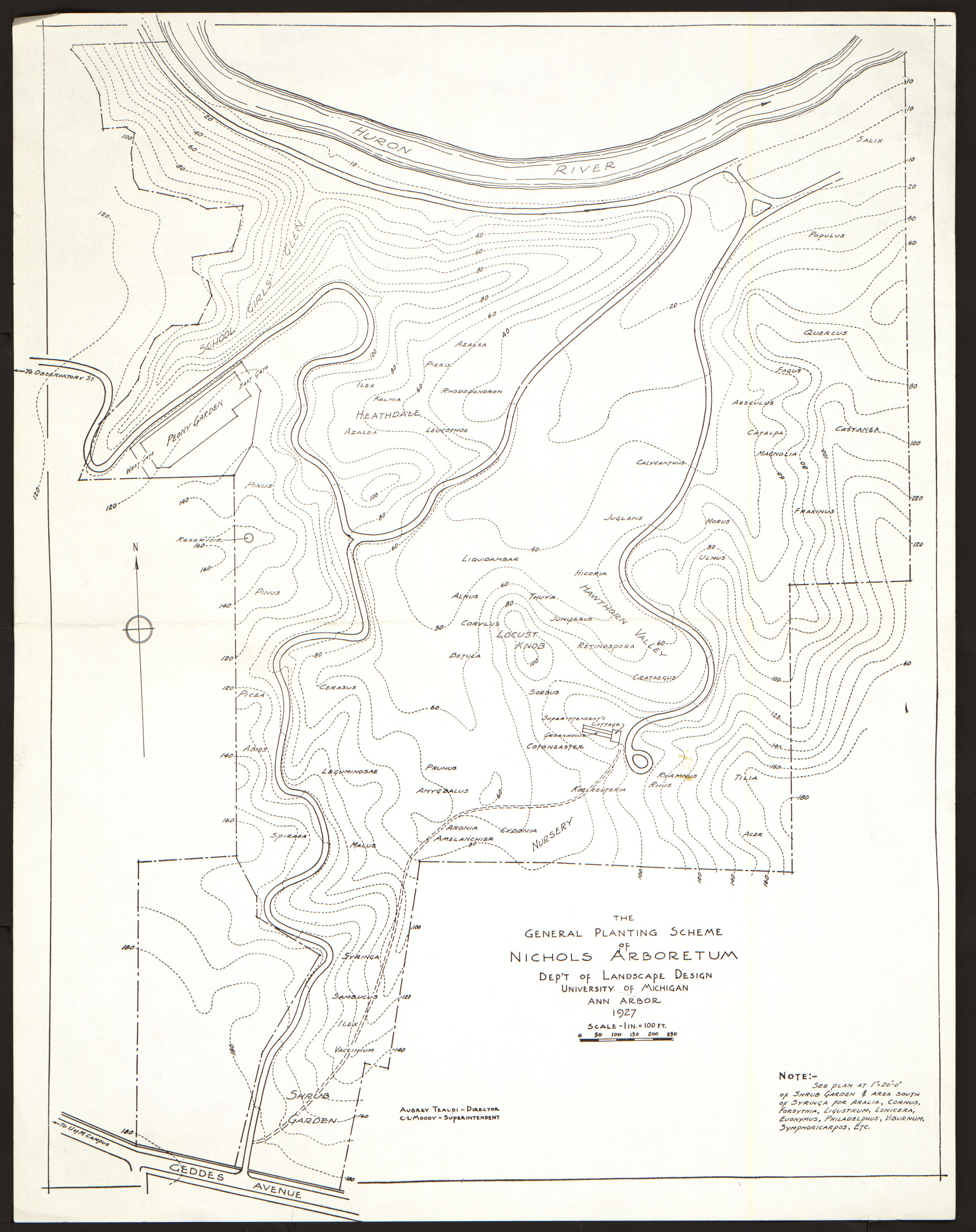
General Planting Scheme of Nichols Arboretum, 1927

=== Landscaped areas ===
- Centennial Shrub Collection - popular ornamental shrubs and small trees including crab apple trees, hawthorn trees, a lilac collection, and spiraea.
- Dow Prairie and adjacent woods (36 acres, 14 hectares) - restored to pre-European settlement. Plants include Andropogon gerardi, Asclepias tuberosa, Carex bicknellii, Oligoneuron rigidum, Ratibida pinnata, Rudbeckia hirta, Schizachyrium scoparium, Silphium terebinthinaceum, Solidago speciosa, Sorghastrum nutans, Symphyotrichum laeve, Symphyotrichum oolentangiense, Vernonia missurica, and Veronicastrum virginicum.
- Gateway Garden - an entry garden based on American meadows, with pools and a dry creek.
- Heathdale - ericaceous and Appalachian Plants, including Catawba and Rosebay rhododendrons (Rhododendron catawbiense and R. maximum), azaleas (Rhododendron spp.), dog-hobble (Leucothoe fontanesiana), mountain laurel (Kalmia latifolia), as well as hemlock (Tsuga canadensis, T. caroliniana, and T. sieboldii), dogwoods (Cornus spp.), witch-hazel (Hamamelis virginiana), and sassafras (Sassafras albidum). Some date from plant collecting expeditions in the 1920s; others have been added in the past decade.
- Rhododendrons - hybrid azaleas and rhododendrons hardy in Ann Arbor.
- Oak Openings - a collection begun in 2001 and in its early stages. It will represent plants once common to oak openings (also called oak savannas) in the Ann Arbor area.
- W. E. Upjohn Peony Garden - the largest public collection of historic (pre-1950) herbaceous peony cultivars in North America; named after physician W. E. Upjohn, who donated a collection of peonies to the university in 1922.

=== Natural areas ===
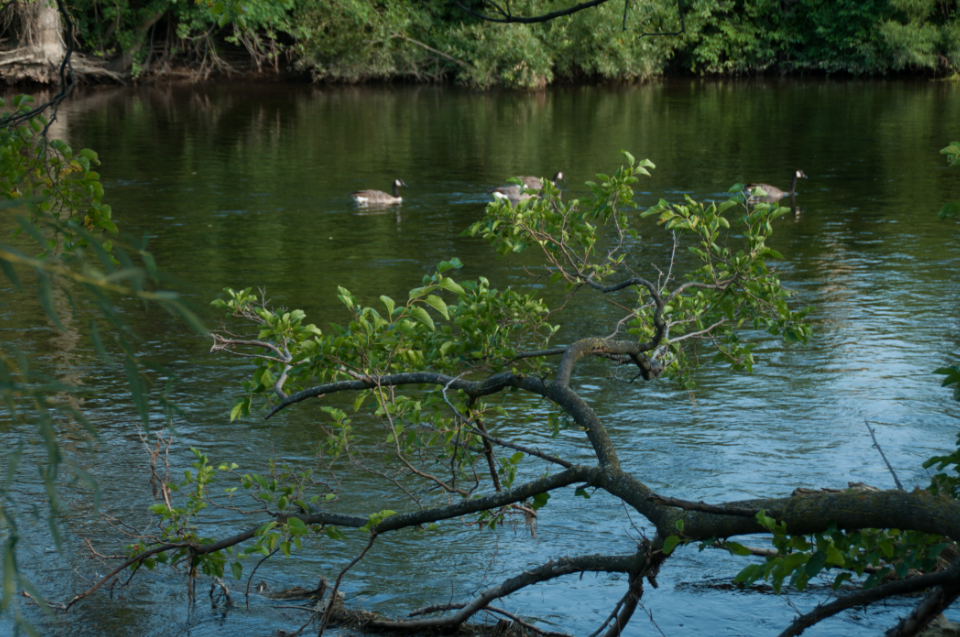

- Uplands - second and third-growth woodland, mostly oak-hickory forest. The oldest oaks range from 75 to 119 years old; the oldest hickories are 109–135 years old. This area includes red, black and white oaks (Quercus rubra, Quercus velutina, and Quercus alba); pignut hickory (Carya glabra); Bur oak (Quercus macrocarpa); white ash (Fraxinus americana); basswood (Tilia americana); shagbark hickory (Carya ovata); bitternut hickory (Carya cordiformis); and black walnut (Juglans nigra). Native understory species include ironwood (Ostrya virginiana), musclewood (Carpinus caroliniana), flowering dogwood (Cornus florida), witch-hazel (Hamamelis virginiana), alternate-leaf dogwood (Cornus alternifolia), maple-leaved viburnum (Viburnum acerifolium), and hazelnut (Corylus americana).
- Wetlands - wet meadow and hardwood swamp species, including American elm (Ulmus americana), red ash (Fraxinus pennsylvanica), silver maple (Acer saccharinum), and black ash (Fraxinus nigra).

== See also ==
- Matthaei Botanical Gardens
- List of botanical gardens in the United States
