= Matthaei Botanical Gardens =

Botanical garden in Ann Arbor, Michigan, United States

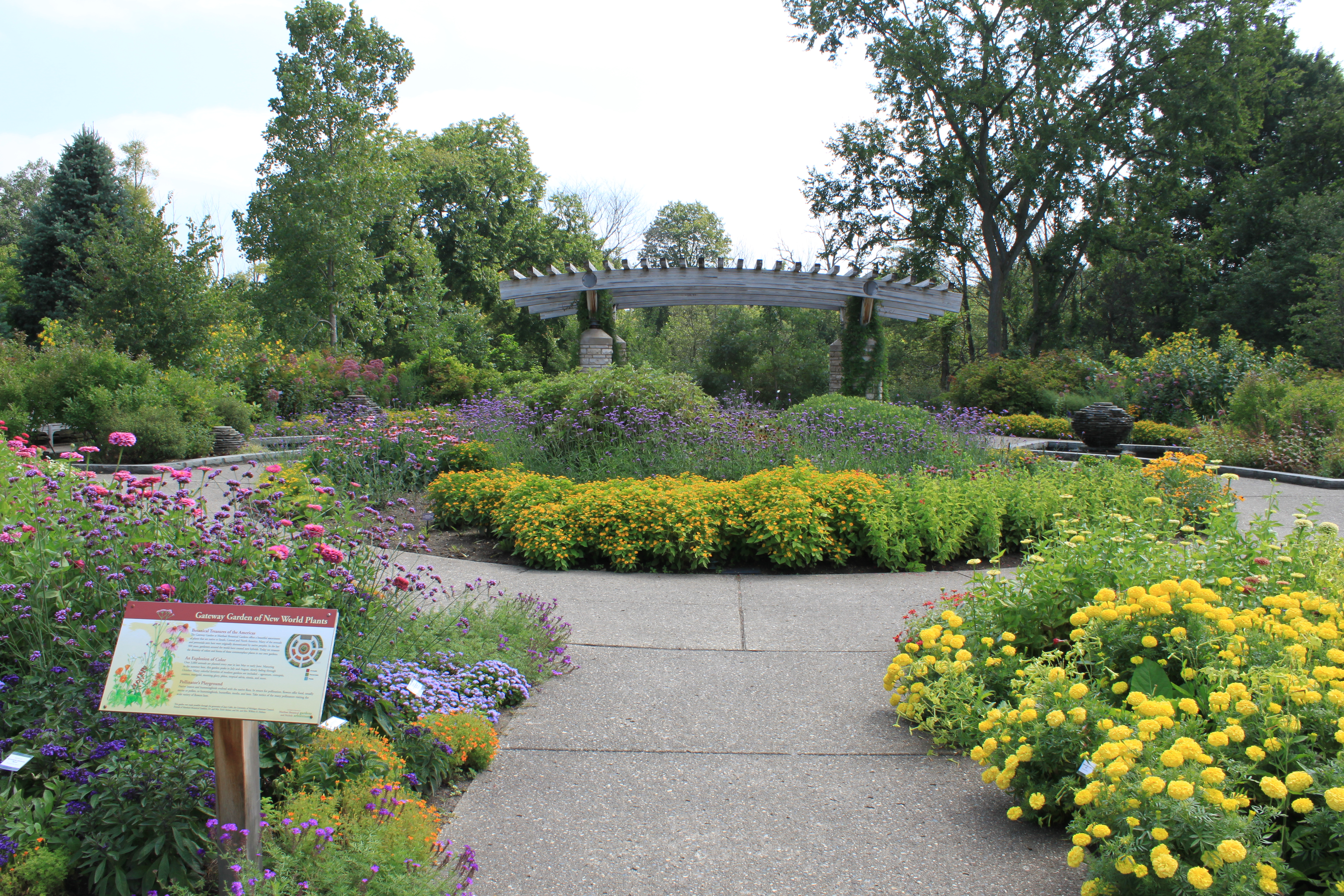
- Outdoor gardens at the Matthaei Botanical Gardens
- Established: 1907
- Location: 1800 N. Dixboro Rd, Ann Arbor, Michigan 48105
- Coordinates: 42.28131°N 83.72329°W
- Type: Arboretum and Botanical Gardens
- Director: Anthony Kolenic
- Curator: David Michener
- Owner: University of Michigan
- Website: Official website

The University of Michigan Matthaei Botanical Gardens (300 acres, 121 hectares) includes botanical gardens, natural areas with trails, and several research-quality habitats and is part of the organization Matthaei Botanical Gardens and Nichols Arboretum. Nichols Arboretum was established in 1907, and Matthaei Botanical Gardens in 1957. The two were combined under a unified administration in 2004.

The botanical gardens includes outdoor display gardens, the Gaffield Children's Garden, a 10,000+ square-foot conservatory, and natural areas with walking trails. The gardens are named after former Michigan regent Frederick C. Matthaei Sr. and his wife Mildred, who donated 200 acres (0.81 km^{2}) of land.

== Gardens and hardy collections ==
The gardens and hardy collections consist of several formal displays and outdoor plantings:

- Alexandra Hicks Herb Knot Garden - modern version of a Tudor period garden, with hedges of the yew (Taxus x media 'hicksii') and boxwood (Buxus sempervirens ‘Green Gem’), as well as lavender (Lavandula angustifolia ‘Hidcote’), creeping thyme (Thymus serpyllum), and winter savory (Satureja montana). The Herb Knot Garden honors "Sandy" Hicks (1934–1991) for her interest in herb and culinary gardening and healing plants and for her enthusiasm in sharing these interests with others.
- Demonstration Prairie - a restored prairie, restoration beginning in 1967, on previously agricultural land.
- Gaffield Children's Garden - The garden features several play areas and interactive stations.
- Gateway Garden of New World Plants - ornamental plants native to the Americas, including coreopsis, cosmos, marigolds, ornamental peppers, petunias, phlox, sunflowers, tropical salvias, and verbenas.
- Helen V. Smith Woodland Wildflower Garden - more than 100 native species of wildflowers, woody plants, and ferns of the southern Great Lakes Region.
- Labyrinth - located in a quiet setting, the labyrinth provides the opportunity for walking meditation, contemplation, and tranquility
- Marie Azary Rock Garden - a rock garden featuring plants that thrive in rocky habitats.
- Matteson Farmstead and Historic Barns - the Matteson farmhouse dates to the 1860s. The smaller barn was built circa 1845–1865, while the larger, gambrel-roofed barn is circa 1875–1900. The farmstead and barns are currently closed to the public (August 2011).
- Norman Memorial Garden - The Norman Memorial Grove is near the west entrance to the Sue Reichert Discovery Trail. The Grove has been expanded with new plantings of native oak, maple, hickory, and sassafras.
- Perennial Garden - Spring and summer bloom.
- Sam Graham Trees - A special collection of major trees native to the state of Michigan.
- Urban Pocket Garden - European hornbeam (Carpinus betulus), eastern white pines (Pinus strobus), and Kentucky coffeetree (Gymnocladus dioicus).

== Conservatory ==
The 10,000+ square-foot conservatory was designed by architect Alden Dow, and completed in 1964. It is believed to be the largest university-operated display greenhouse in the United States. The conservatory contains three distinct areas:

- Tropical house - Collections include Ananas comosus, Annona muricata, bromeliads, Caryota mitis, Cocos nucifera, Coffea arabica, cycads (including a Dioon spinulosum given by Smith College in the 1920s), Heliconia vellerigera, Kigelia pinnata, Musa, orchids, Oryza sativa, Piper nigrum, Rhizophora mangle, and Theobroma cacao.
- Temperate house - representing the Mediterranean region and warm-temperate Asia. Collections include bonsai displays (more than 40 specimens) and an Oriental camellia display, as well as Camellia sinensis, Ceratonia siliqua, Cyperus papyrus, Ficus carica, Gossypium arboreum, Laurus nobilis, Olea europaea, Phoenix dactylifera, Phyllostachys nigra, and Quercus suber.
- Arid house - representing hot deserts of the world. Collections include cactus, succulents, euphorbia, and lithops, as well as Agave americana, Aloe marlothii, Bowiea volubilis, Cyphostemma juttae, and Euphorbia milii.
- Bonsai Collection - three bonsai trees or plants are always on display in the temperate house of the conservatory. There is also a bonsai display garden located outside of the conservatory where more of the bonsai collection is displayed for the public.

== Natural areas and trails ==
The natural areas include mature woodlands, wetlands, several ponds, and a constructed tall-grass prairie, with four nature trails covering 3.2 miles.

- Dix Pond Trail - Nature reclaims old pastures, planted woodlots, and long-abandoned gravel pits.
- Fleming Creek Trail - Abundant habitat diversity along with smaller wildlife.
- Marilyn Bland Prairie - a rich span of wildlife lives in the prairie, old fields, oak openings, and wetlands that are close to the historic Matteson farm and barns.
- Sam Graham Trees Trail - Find Michigan's important trees arrayed in wetland to upland woods and into savanna habitats along this trail.
- Sue Reichert Discovery Trail - Child-oriented.

== Gallery ==
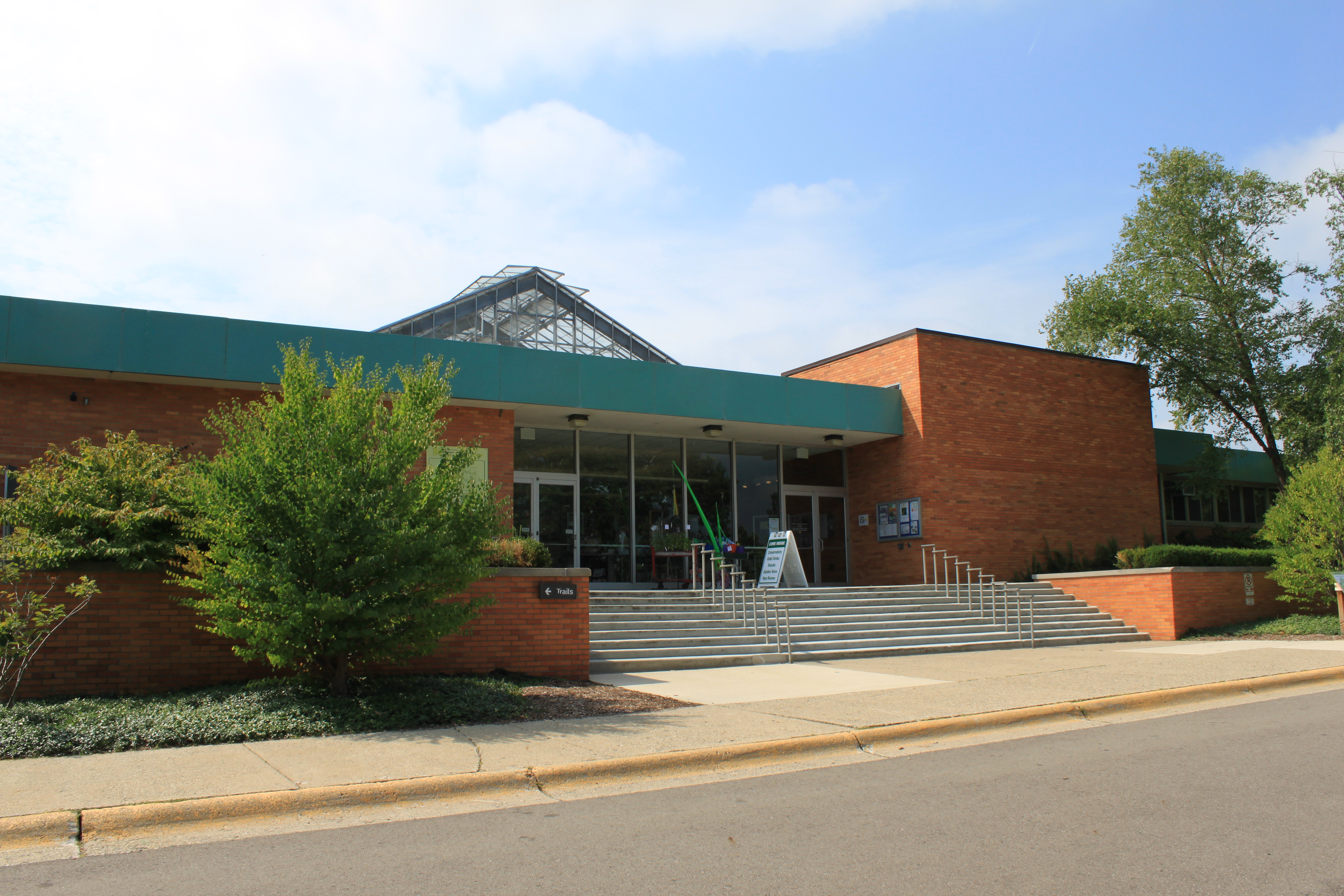
Visitor center

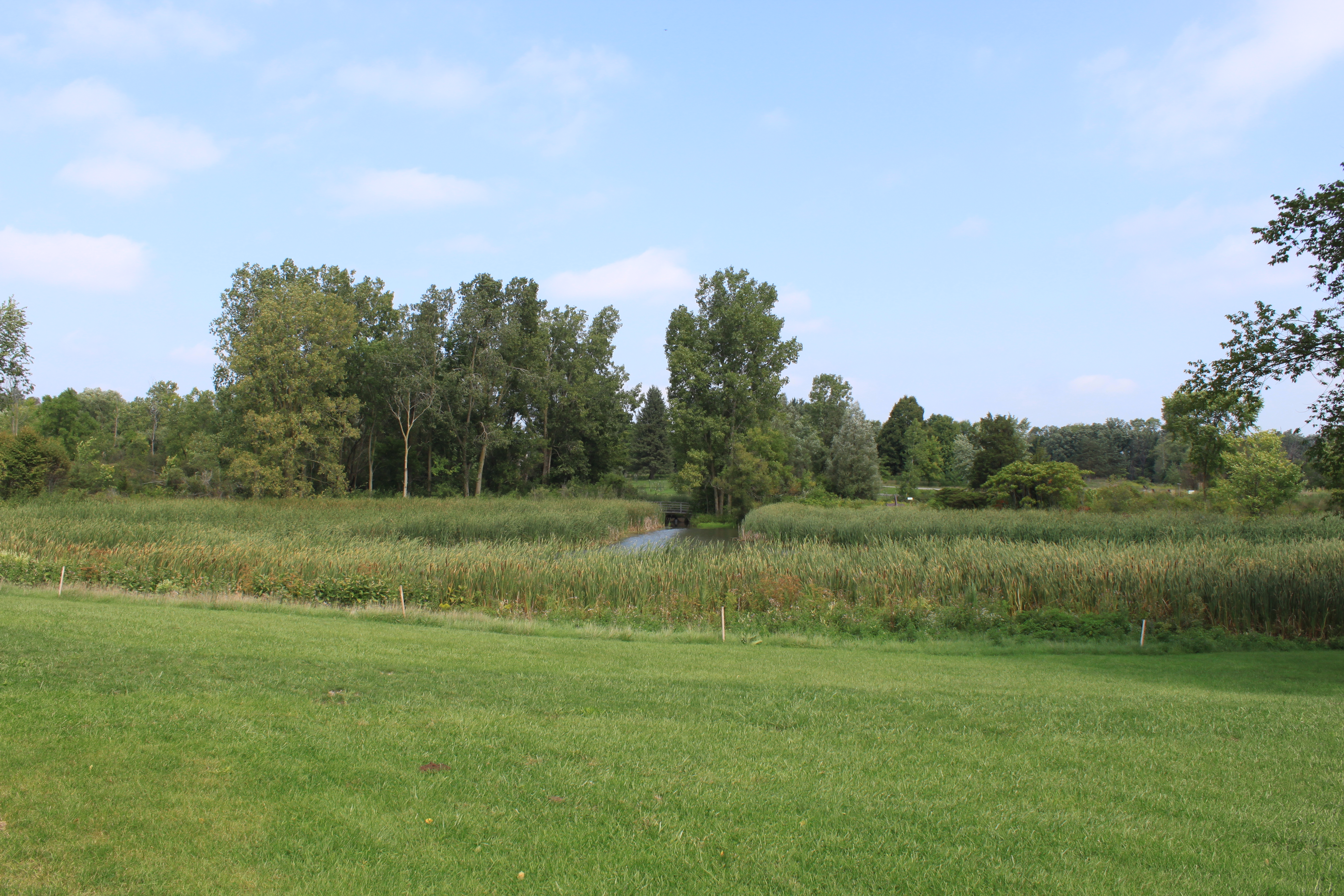
Willow Pond

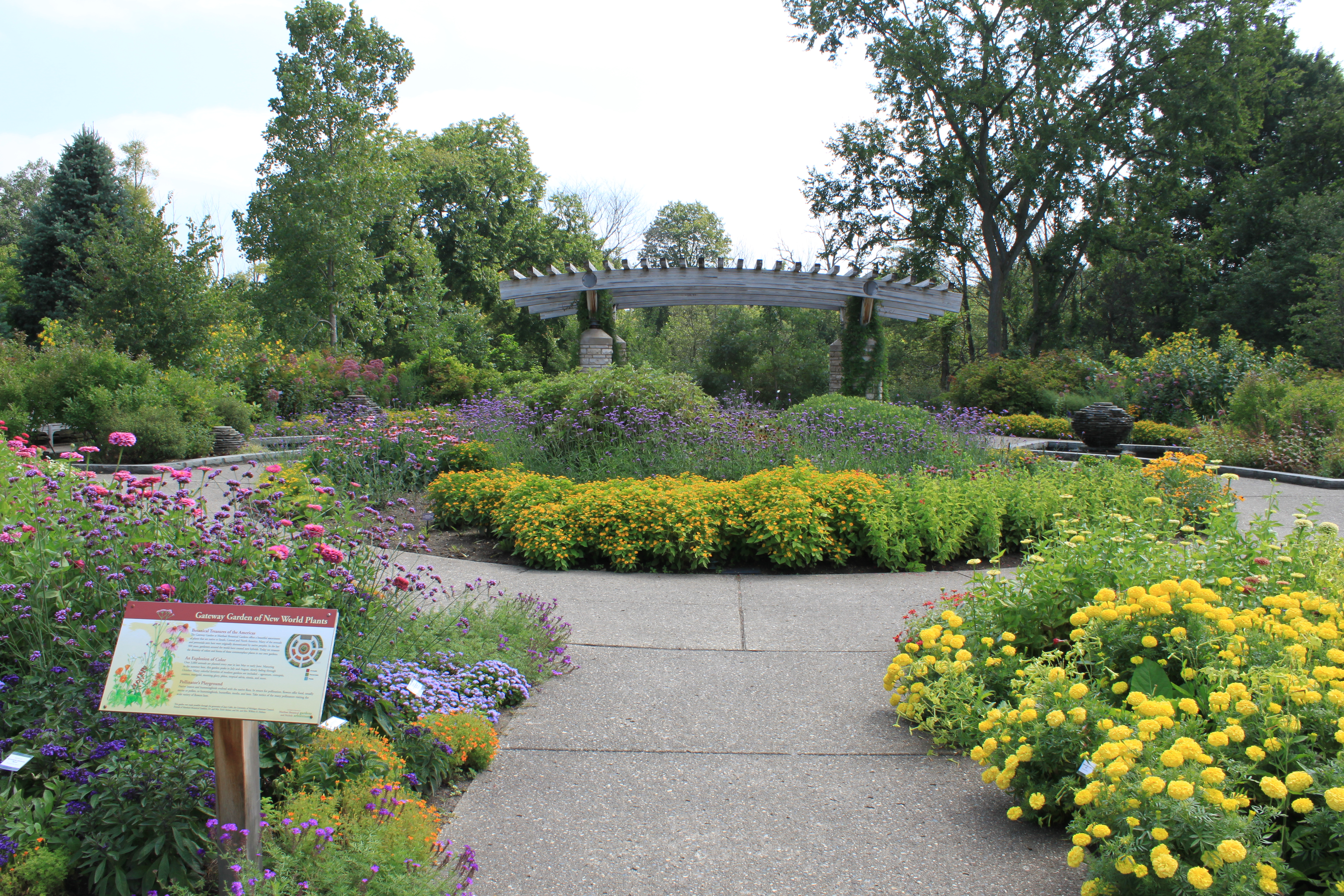
Gateway Garden of New World Plants

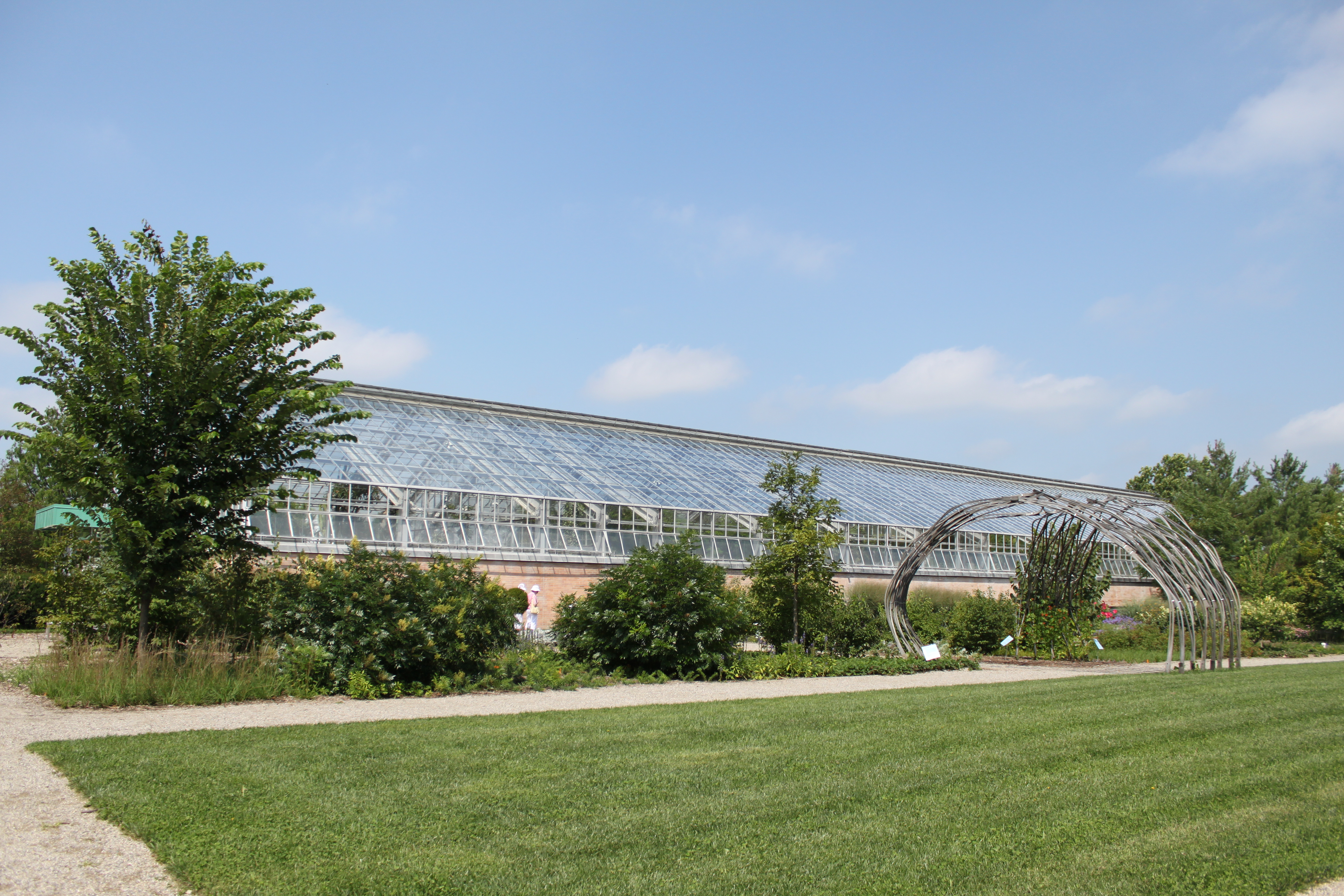
Greenhouse and Spring-Back Gateway

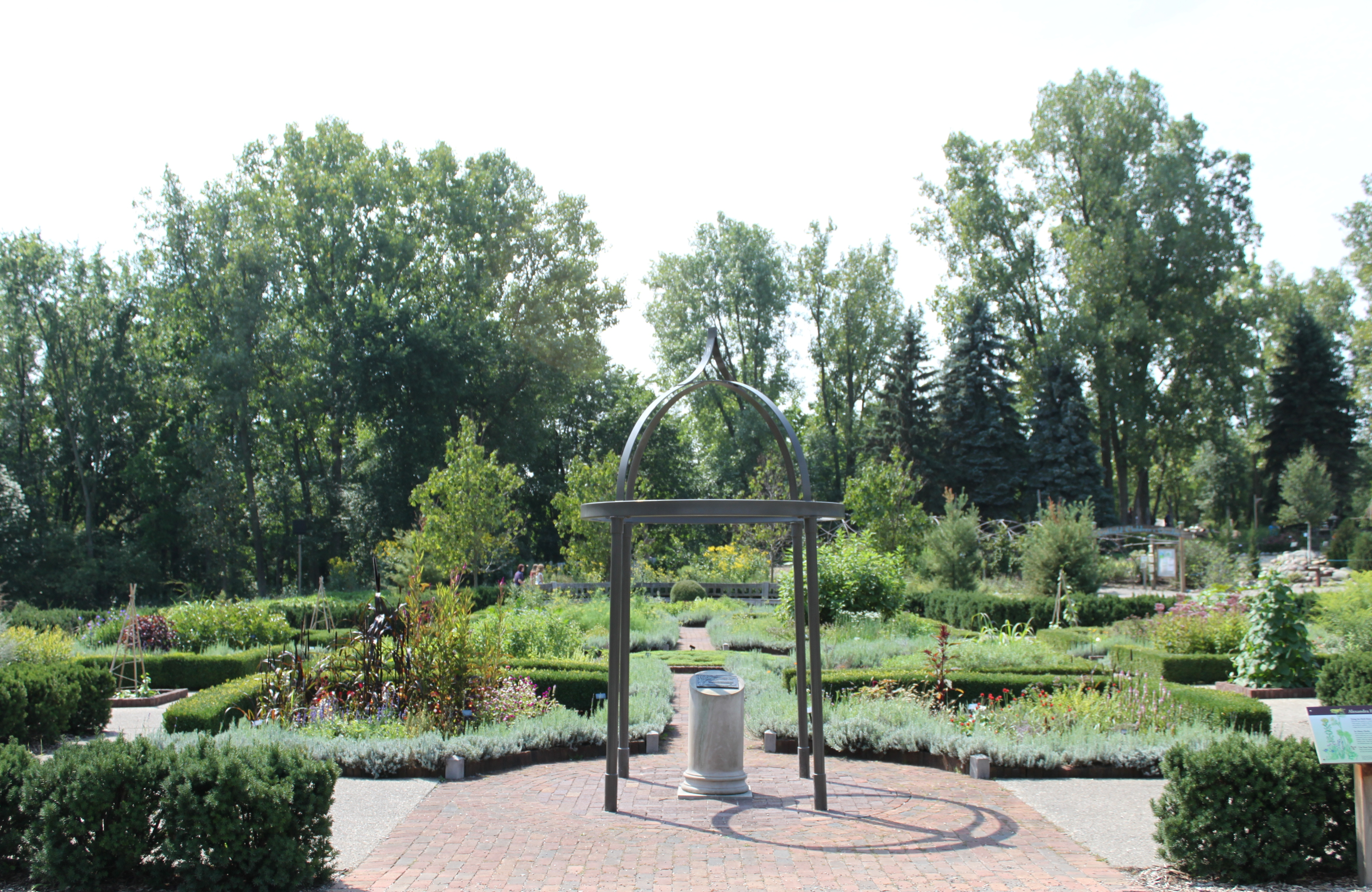
Herb Knot Garden

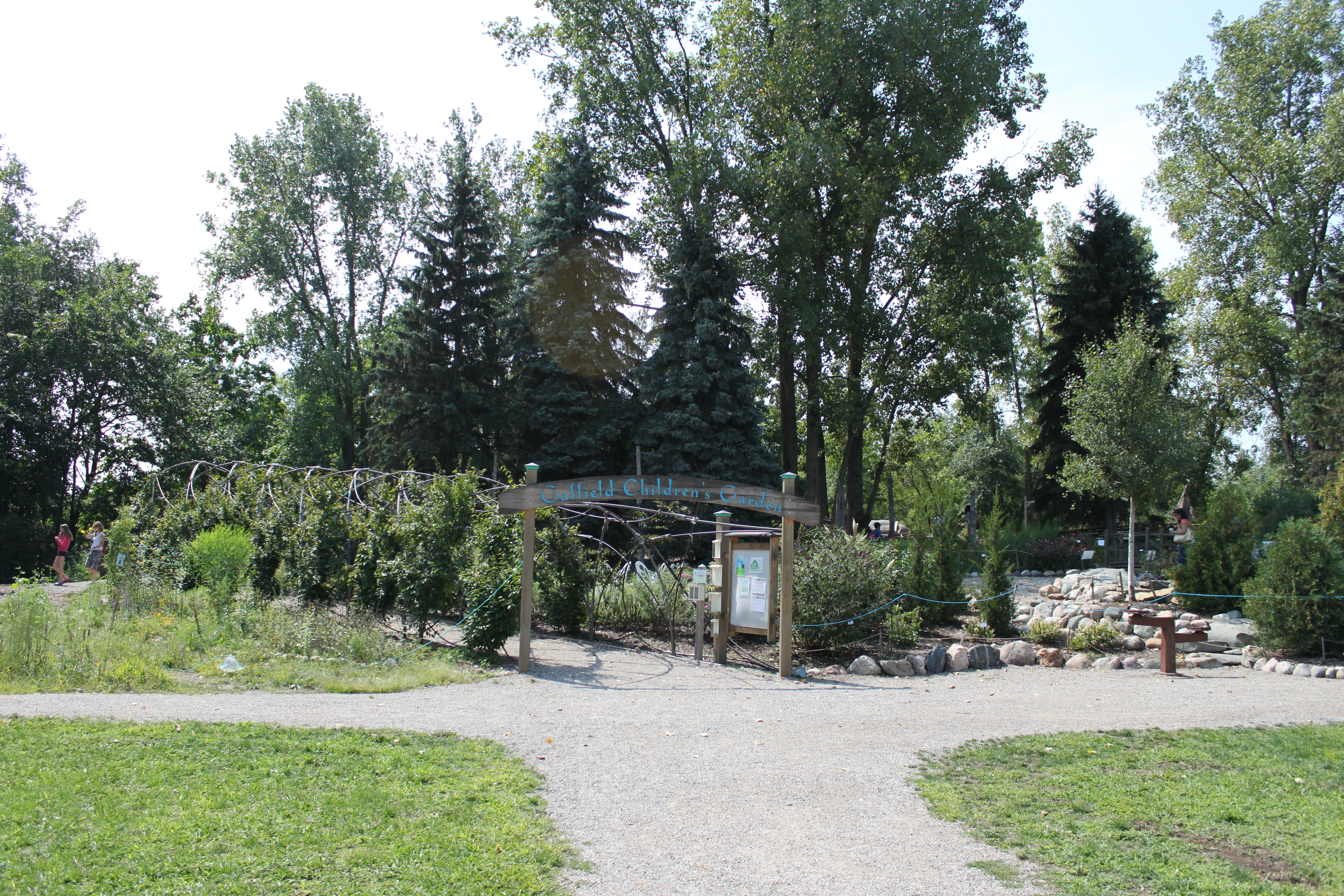
Gaffield Children's Garden

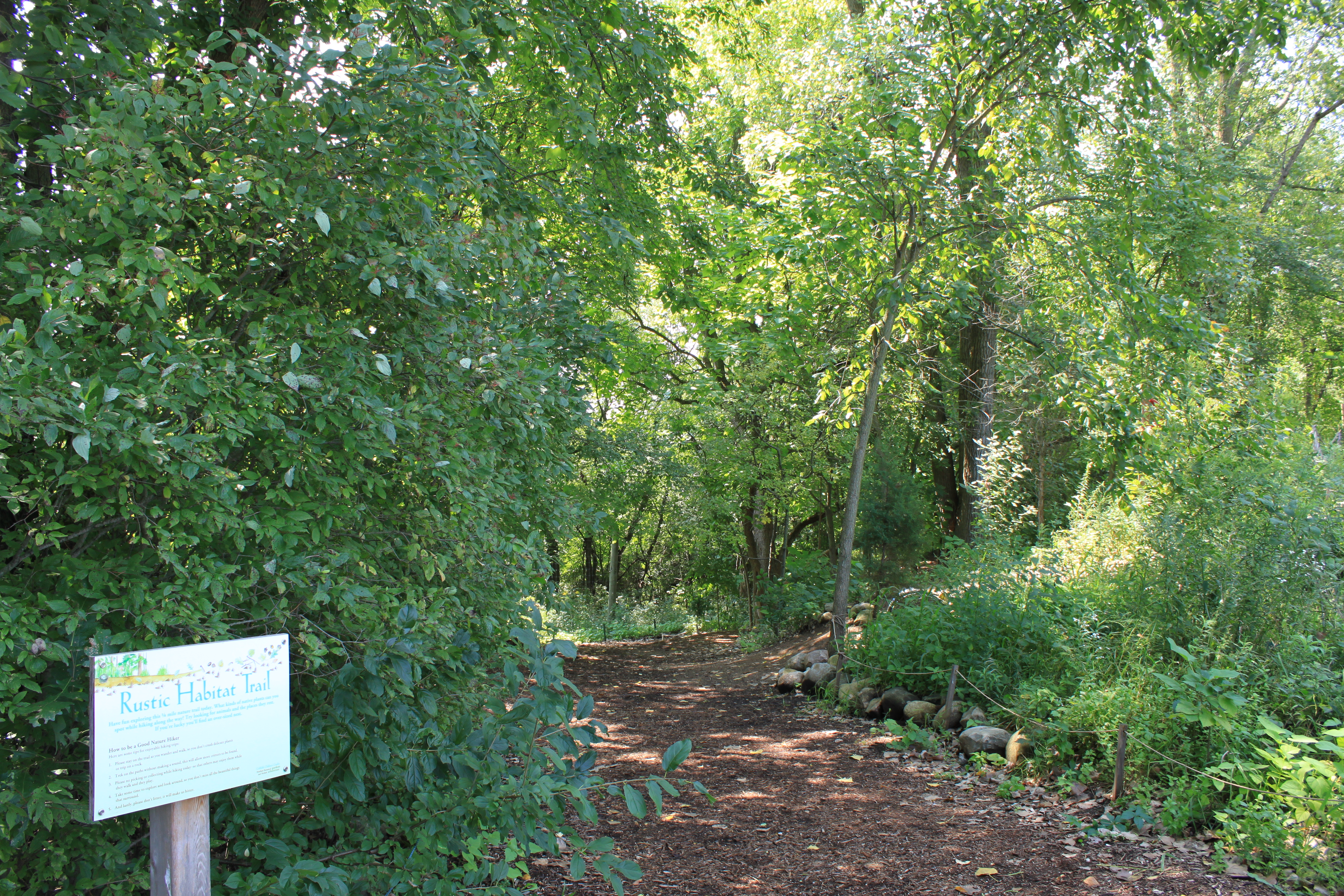
Rustic habitat trail

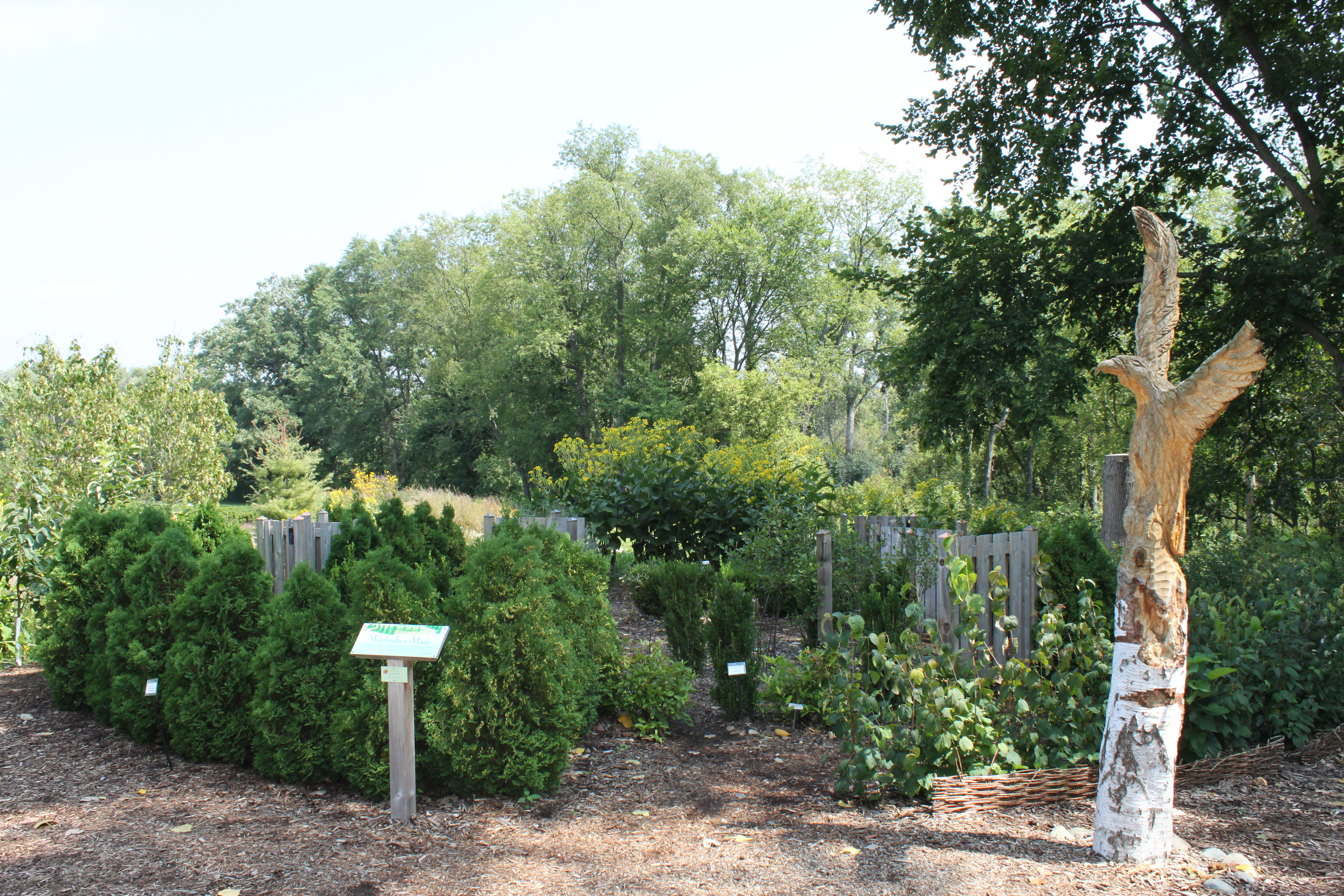
Wayfinder's Maze

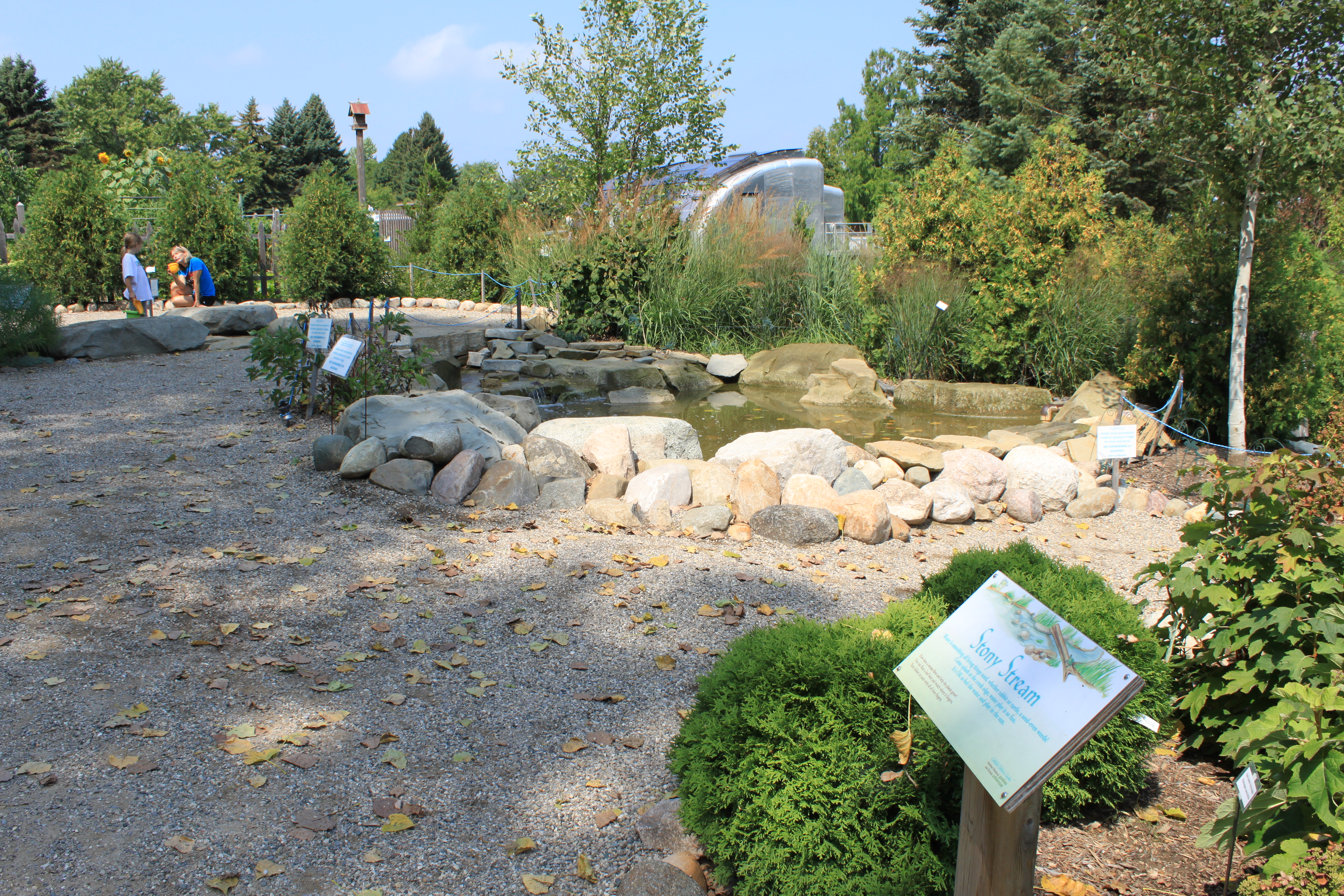
Stony stream

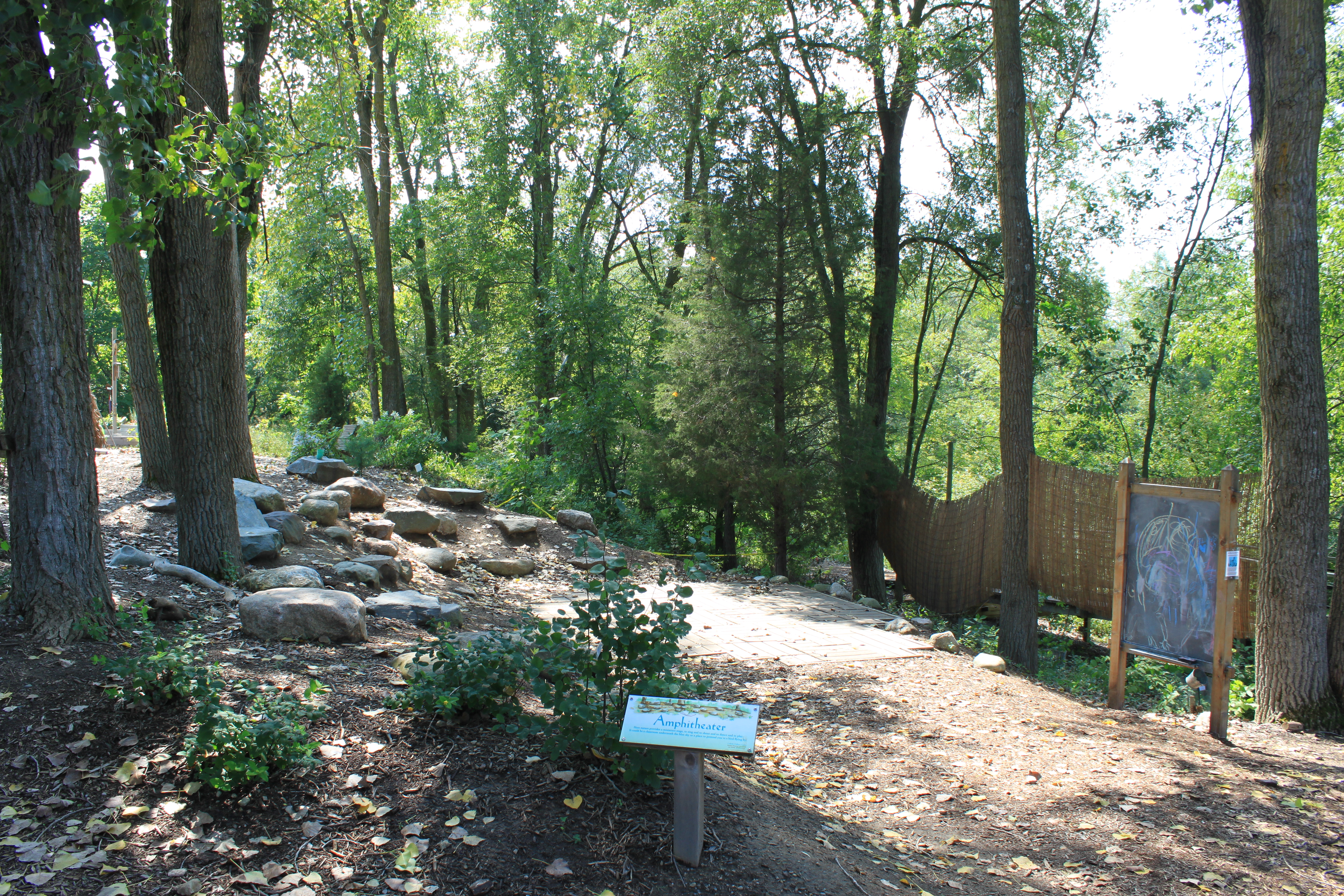
Amphitheater

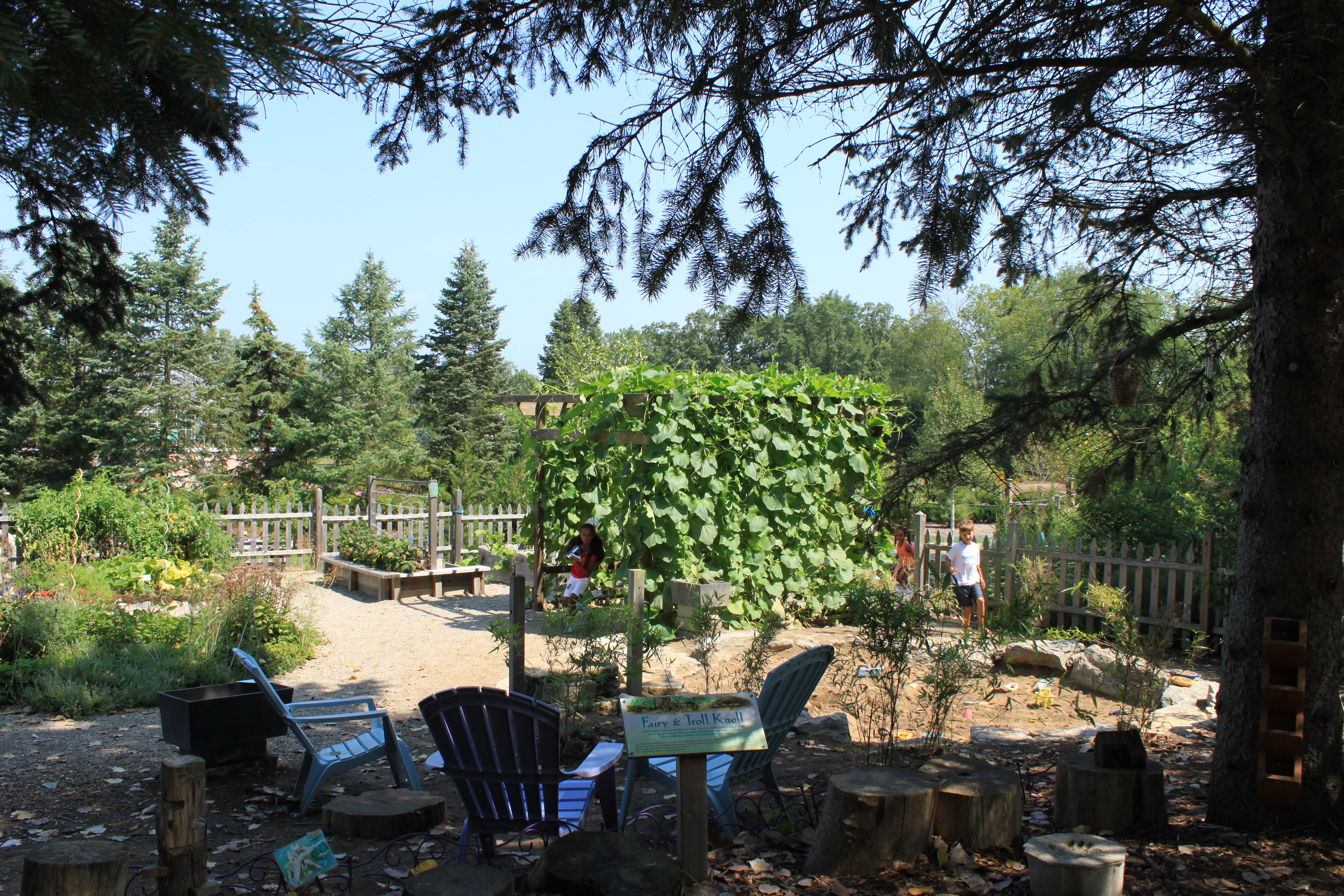
Fairy & Troll Knoll

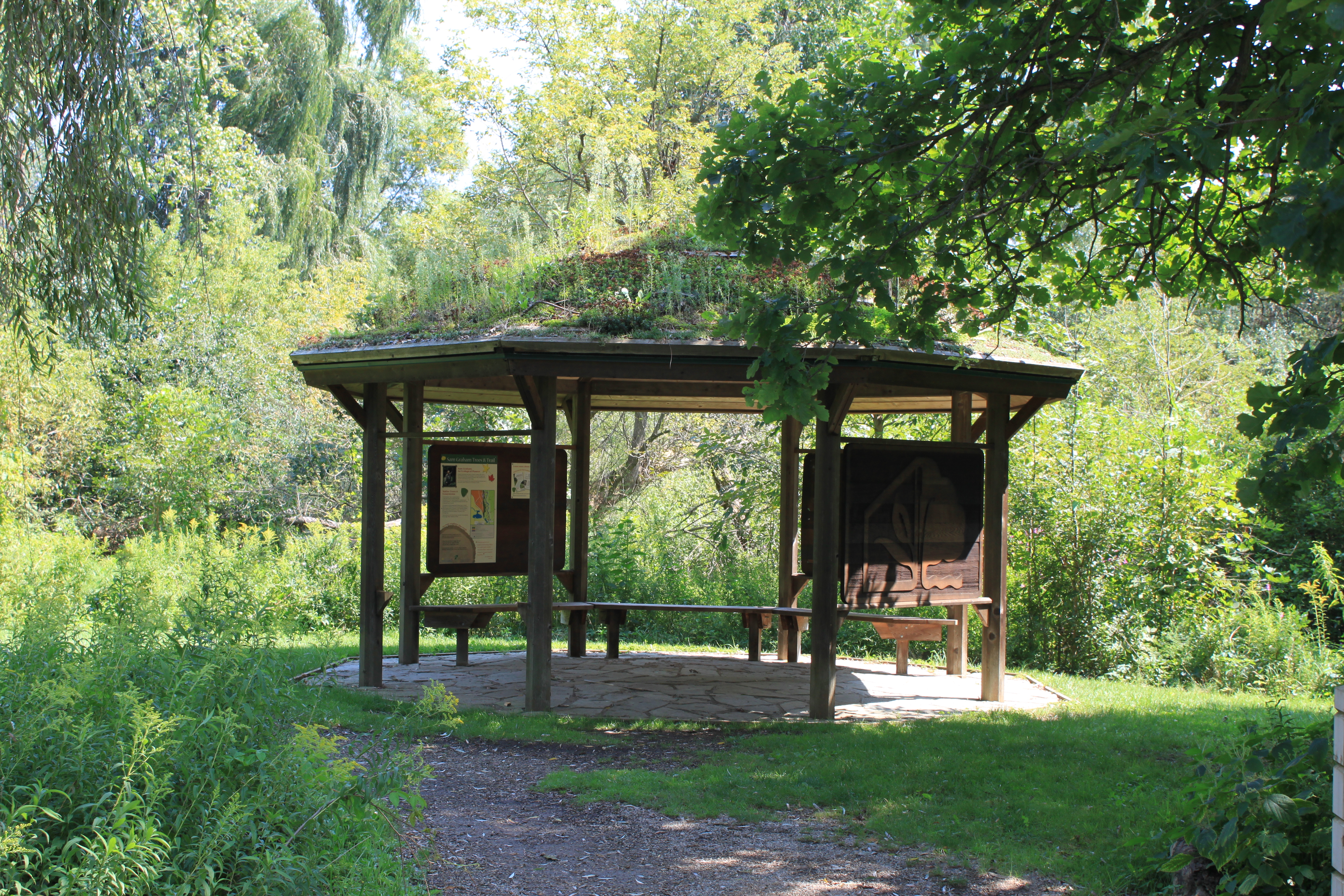
Wetland kiosk

== See also ==
- Harley Harris Bartlett
- Frjeda Blanchard
- Nichols Arboretum
- List of botanical gardens in the United States
- Tourism in metropolitan Detroit
