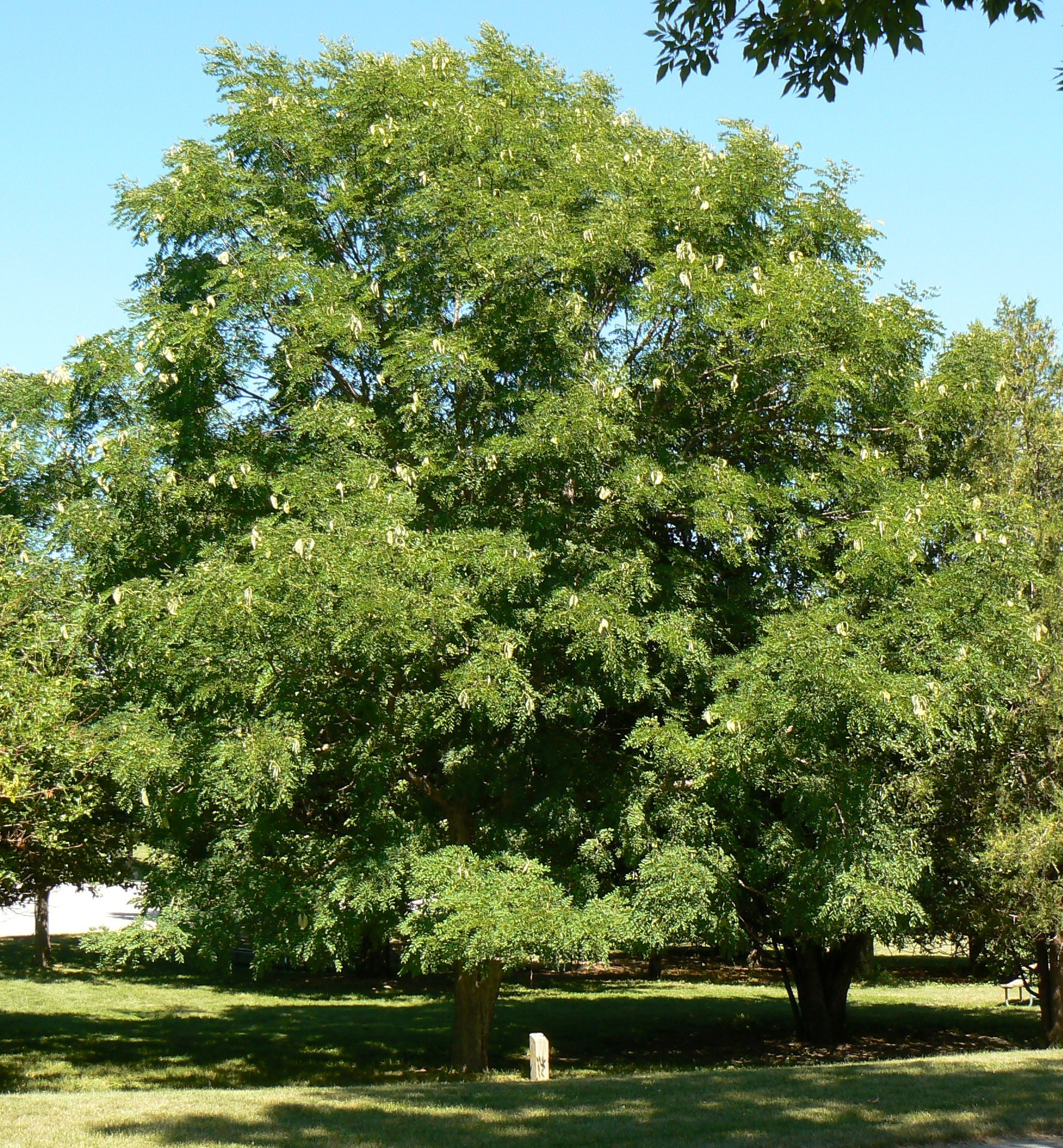
- Kentucky coffeetree, Gymnocladus dioicus

Scientific classification
- Kingdom: Plantae
- Clade: Tracheophytes
- Clade: Angiosperms
- Clade: Eudicots
- Clade: Rosids
- Order: Fabales
- Family: Fabaceae
- Subfamily: Caesalpinioideae
- Genus: Gymnocladus; Lam. (1785)

Species
- Gymnocladus angustifolius (Gagnep.) J.E.Vidal; Gymnocladus assamicus Kanjilal ex P.C.Kanjilal; Gymnocladus burmanicus C.E.Parkinson; Gymnocladus chinensis Baill.; Gymnocladus dioicus (L.) K.Koch; Gymnocladus guangxiensis P.C.Huang & Q.W.Yao

= Gymnocladus =

Genus of legumes

Gymnocladus (Neo-Latin, from Greek γυμνὀς, gymnos, naked + κλάδος, klados, branch) is a small genus of leguminous trees. The common name coffeetree is used for this genus. It includes six species native to eastern North America and southeastern Asia.

== Description ==
Gymnocladus species are very large, deciduous trees with bipinnate leaves.

The greenish-white flowers only appear after long periods of warm weather. Very long legumes are formed that hang from the branches. The species of this genus are predominantly distributed endochorically.

== Species ==
There are five species:

Image	Name	Common name	Distribution
	Gymnocladus assamicus		India
	Gymnocladus angustifolius		Vietnam
	Gymnocladus burmanicus	Dekang tree	Myanmar, India, Vietnam
	Gymnocladus chinensis	soap tree	central China
	Gymnocladus dioicus	Kentucky coffeetree	Midwest and Eastern North America
	Gymnocladus guangxiensis		southeastern China (Guangxi)
