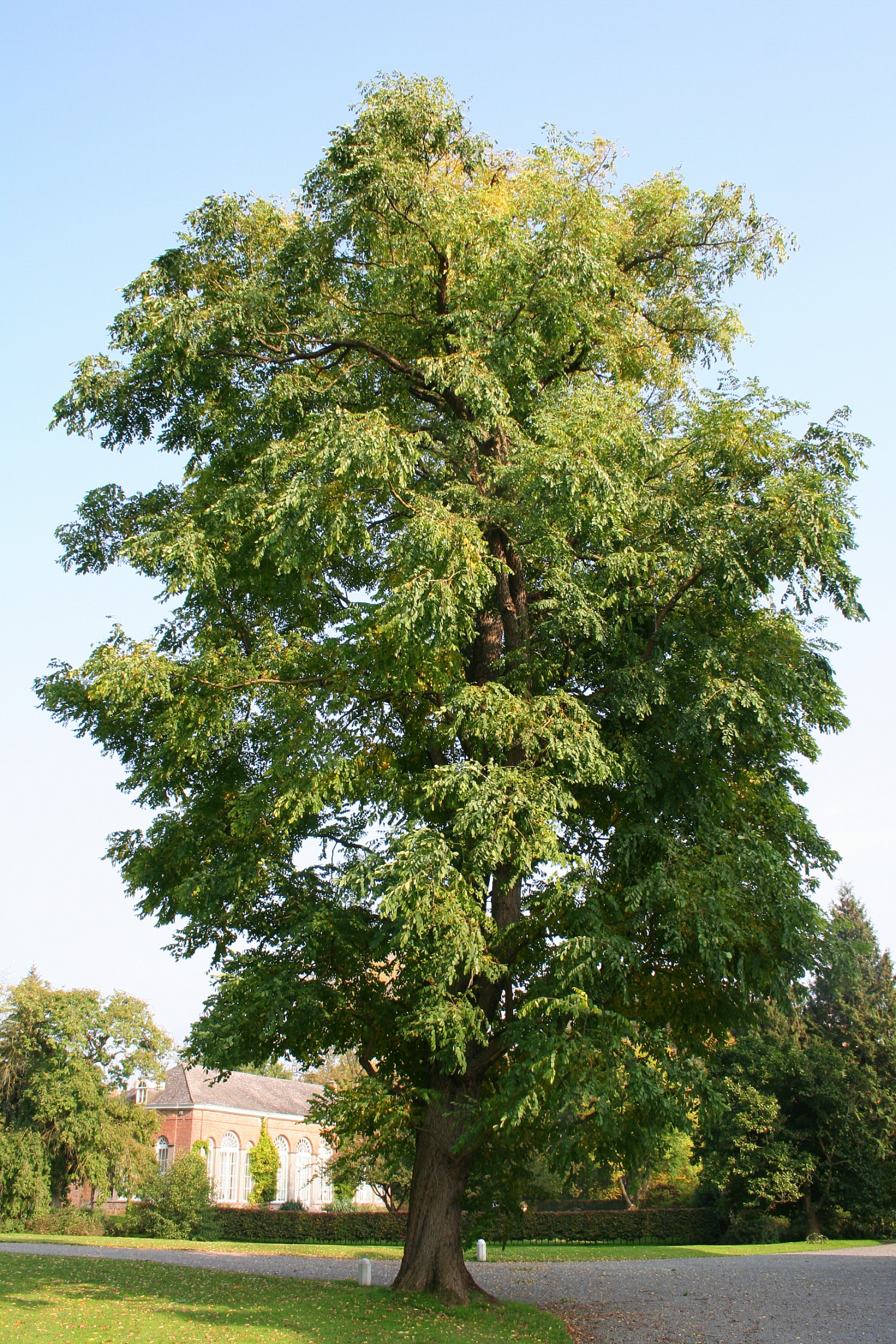
- Kentucky coffeetree in Harveng, Belgium

Conservation status
- Vulnerable (IUCN 3.1)

- Secure (NatureServe)

Scientific classification
- Kingdom: Plantae
- Clade: Tracheophytes
- Clade: Angiosperms
- Clade: Eudicots
- Clade: Rosids
- Order: Fabales
- Family: Fabaceae
- Subfamily: Caesalpinioideae
- Genus: Gymnocladus
- Species: G. dioicus

Binomial name
- Gymnocladus dioicus (L.) K. Koch
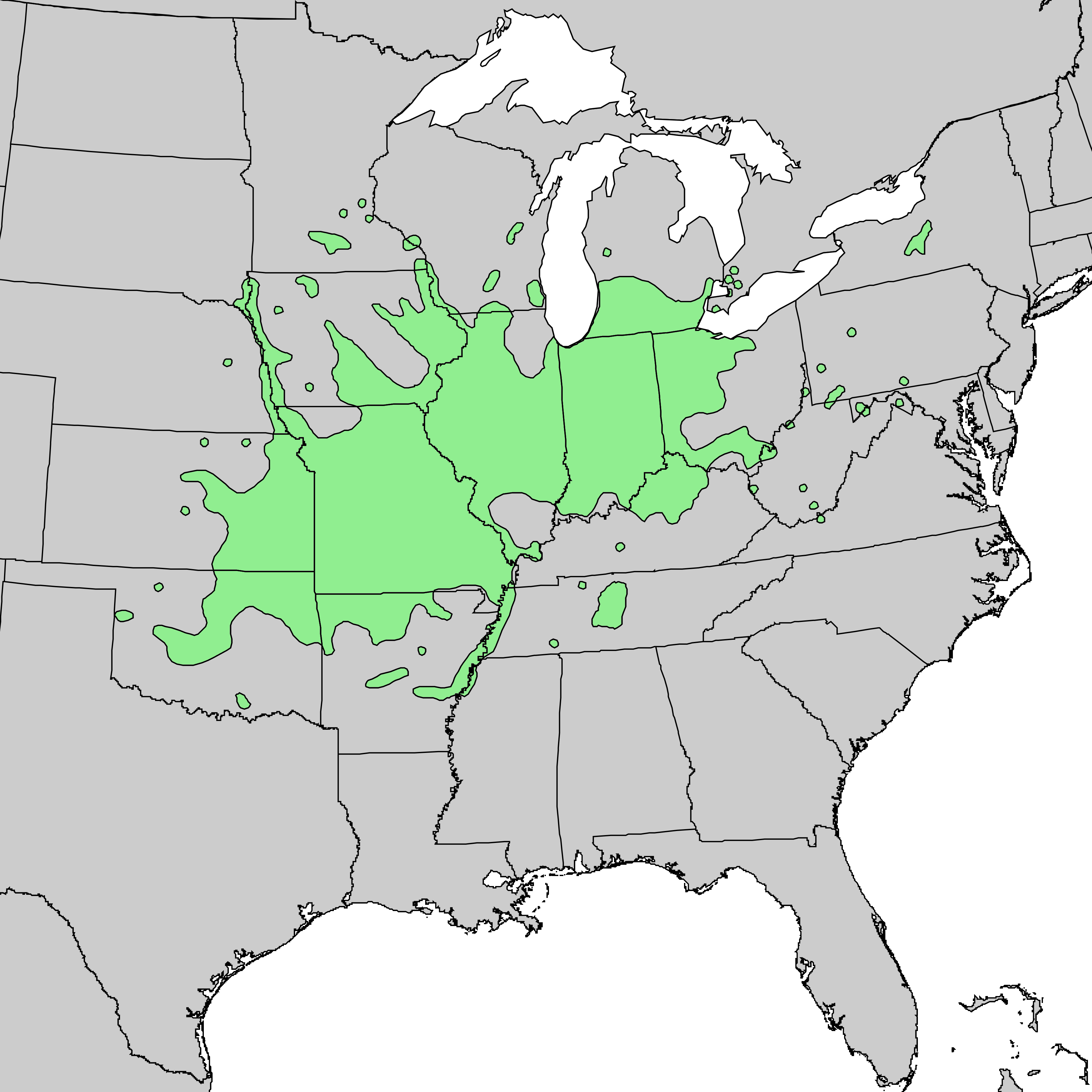
- Natural range

Synonyms
- Gymnocladus canadensis Lam.; Guilandina dioica L.; Gymnocladus dioicus (L.) K. Koch [Spelling variant]

= Kentucky coffeetree =

Kentucky coffee tree

Species of plant

The Kentucky coffeetree (Gymnocladus dioicus), also known as American coffee berry, Kentucky mahogany, nicker tree, and stump tree, is a tree in the subfamily Caesalpinioideae of the legume family Fabaceae, native to the Midwest, Upper South, Appalachia, and small pockets of New York in the United States and Ontario in Canada. The seed may be roasted and used as a substitute for coffee beans; however, unroasted pods and seeds are toxic. The wood from the tree is used by cabinetmakers and carpenters. It is also planted as a street tree.

From 1976 to 1994, the Kentucky coffeetree was the state tree of Kentucky, after which the tulip poplar was returned to that designation.

== Description ==
The tree varies from 18 to 21 meters (59 to 69 ft) high with a spread of 12–15 meters (39–49 ft) and a trunk up to one meter (3.3 feet) in diameter. The tree grows at a medium rate with height increases of anywhere from 12 to 24 in (30 to 61 cm) per year. A 10-year-old sapling will stand about 4 meters (13 feet) tall. It usually separates 3 to 4 1/2 meters (9.8 to 14.8 feet) from the ground into three or four divisions which spread slightly and form a narrow pyramidal head; or when crowded by other trees, sending up one tall central branchless shaft to the height of 15–21 m (49–69 ft). Branches are stout, pithy, and blunt; roots are fibrous.

The Kentucky coffeetree is a moderately fast-growing tree, and male trees are often grown in parks and along city streets for ornamental purposes. The tree is typically fairly short-lived, healthy trees living from 100 to 150 years. The Kentucky coffeetree sheds its leaves early during the fall and appears bare for up to 6 months. The naked appearance of the tree is reflected through the Kentucky coffeetree's Greek genus name, which means "naked branch". Like the Sumac, branches are absent of fine spray; smaller branches are thick and lumpish. Because of the absence of smaller branches and its later leafing, the French in Canada named it Chicot, "stubby". The expanding leaves are conspicuous because of the varied colors of the leaflets; the youngest are bright pink, while those which are older vary from green to bronze.

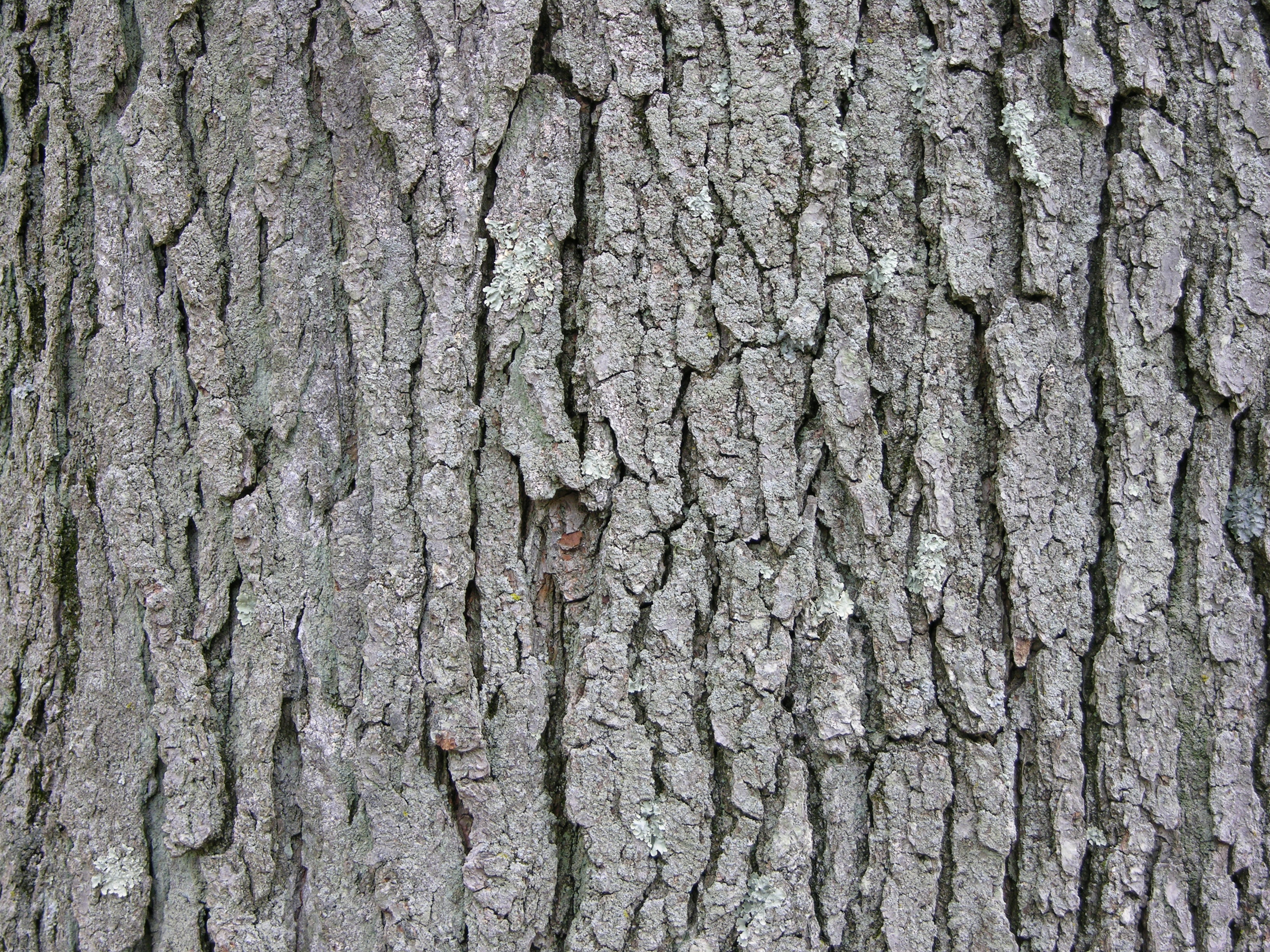
Bark of the Kentucky coffeetree

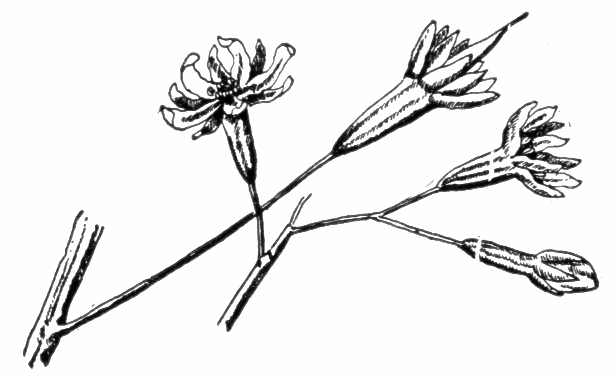
Flowers

The bark is ash-gray and scaly, flaking similarly to black cherry, but more so. The trees are dioecious, and the fruit is a hard-shelled bean in heavy, woody, thick-walled pods filled with sweet, thick, gooey pulp. Pod length ranges from 5 to 10 inches (130 to 250 mm); unfertilized female trees may bear miniature seedless pods. The beans are commonly thought to contain the toxin cytisine, although this has yet to be confirmed in a study.

- Bark: Tan or dark gray, deeply fissured, surface scaly, often with prominent narrow ridges. Branchlets at first coated with short reddish down.
- Wood: Light brown; heavy, strong, coarse-grained; durable in contact with the ground, takes a fine polish. Specific gravity, 0.6934; weight of cubic foot, 43.21 lb (19.60 kg).
- Winter buds: Minute, depressed in downy cavities of the stem, two in the axil of each leaf, the smaller sterile. Bud scales two, ovate, coated with brown tomentum and growing with the shoot, become orange green, hairy and about one inch long, before they fall.
- Leaves: Alternate, bipinnately compound, ten to fourteen pinnate, lowest pinnae reduced to leaflets, the other seven to thirteen foliate. One to three feet long, eighteen to twenty-four inches broad, by the greater development of the upper pairs of pinnae. Leaf stalks and stalks of pinnae, are terete, enlarged at base, smooth when mature, pale green, often purple on the upper side. Leaflets ovate, two to two and one-half inches long, wedge-shaped or irregularly rounded at base, with wavy margin, acute apex. They come out of the bud bright pink, but soon become bronze green, smooth and shining above. When full grown are dark yellow green above, pale green beneath. In autumn turn a bright clear yellow. Stipules leaf-like, lanceolate, serrate, deciduous.
- Winter twigs are very stout and dark reddish brown to green brown in color; the pith is very thick and salmon pink to brown in color. The terminal bud is absent, and the lateral buds are small, bronze in color, and appear to be partially sunken beneath the bark of the twig. The leaf scars are very large, heart shaped with 3 to 5 conspicuous bundle scars. The flowers are dioecious (male and female flowers on separate plants). The female flowers are 8 to 12 inches long, greenish white in color, appear in early summer, and are quite fragrant. The male flowers are about half the size of the female flowers.
- Flowers: June. Dioecious by abortion, terminal, greenish white. Staminate flowers in a short raceme-like corymb three to four inches (75–100 mm) long, pistillate flowers in a raceme ten to twelve inches (250–300 mm) long.
- Calyx: Tubular, hairy, ten-ribbed, five-lobed; lobes valvate in bud, acute, nearly equal.
- Corolla: Petals five, oblong, hairy, spreading or reflexed, imbricate in bud.
- Stamens: Ten, five long and five short, free, included; filaments thread-like; anthers orange colored, introrse; in the pistillate flower small and sterile.
- Pistil: Ovary superior, sessile, hairy, contracted into a short style, with two stigmatic lobes; ovules in two rows.
- Fruit: Legume, six to ten inches (150–250 mm) long, one and one-half to two inches wide, somewhat curved, with thickened margins, dark reddish brown with slight glaucous bloom, crowned with remnant of the styles. Stalks an inch or two long. Seeds six to nine, surrounded by a thick layer of dark, sweet pulp.
- Rooting Habit, "Tap Root in proportion like a carrot". A seedling tree grows many times in root length to its growth upward in height. The Kentucky coffee tree is not commonly offered in the nursery trade because the taproot makes the tree somewhat difficult to transplant. Being in the Legume family the roots fix nitrogen in the soil.
- Soil: Prefers rich, moist soils in floodplains, terraces, ravines, coves, and lower slopes.

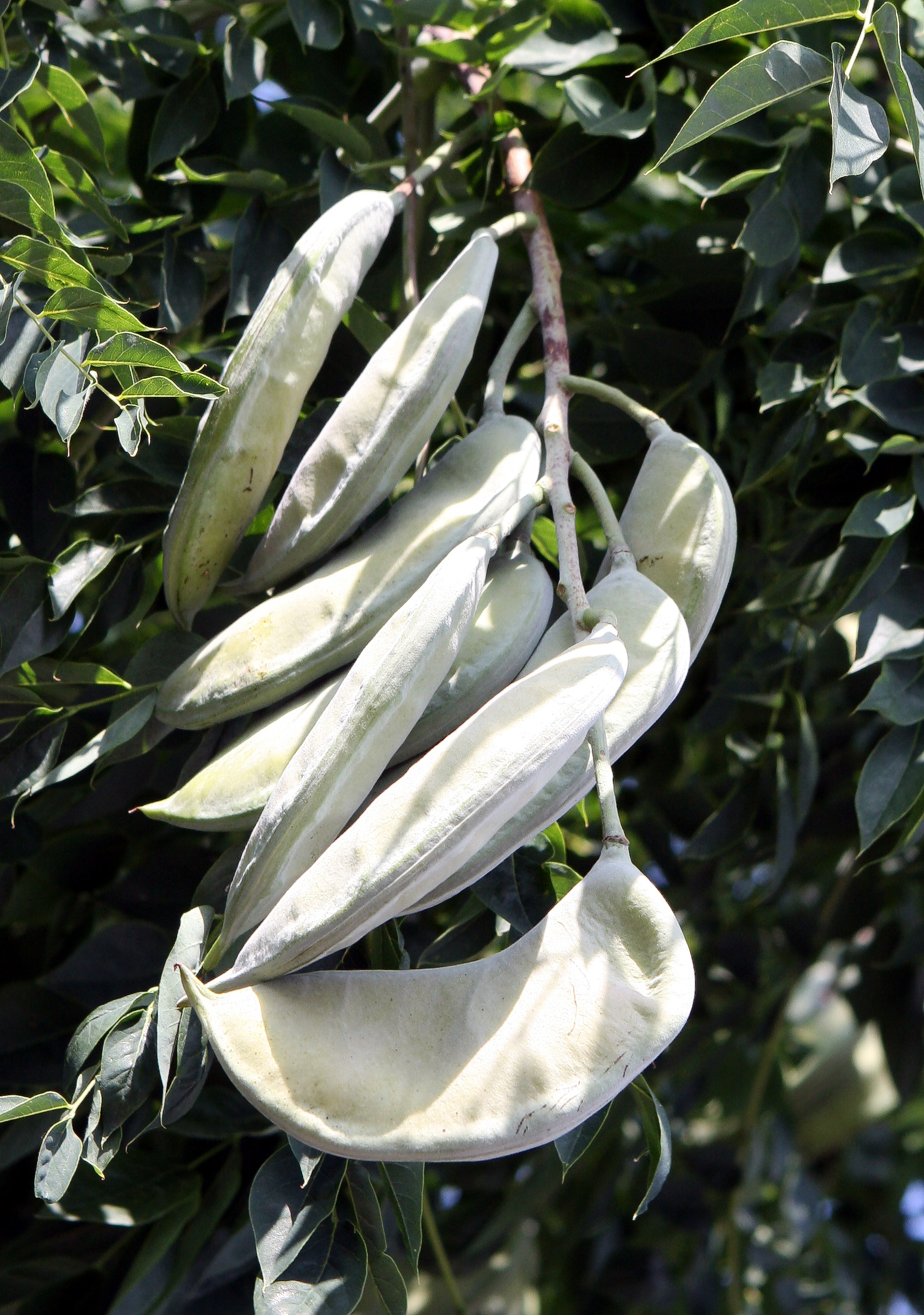
Fruit

== Taxonomy ==
Gymnocladus is derived from the Ancient Greek κλάδος (kládos) "branch" and γυμνός (gumnós) "naked" and refers to the stout branchlets unclothed with small twigs.

It is one of five species in the genus Gymnocladus, and the only one native to North America; the other four being native to South, Southeast and Eastern Asia.

The name is sometimes hyphenated as 'coffee-tree'; the form 'coffeetree' here is as used officially by the United States Forest Service.

== Distribution ==
The Kentucky coffeetree is widely distributed, but considered a rare tree species. "Rare species are those that are so uncommon that they should be monitored to determine whether their populations are becoming threatened."

The tree's native range is limited, occurring from Southern Ontario, Canada and in the United States from Kentucky (where it was first encountered by Europeans) and Connecticut in the east, to Kansas, eastern Nebraska, and southeastern South Dakota in the west, to southern Wisconsin and Michigan in the north, and to northern Louisiana in the south. It is planted as an urban shade tree across the United States and eastern Canada, including California. It has a disjunct population in Central New York.

The trees occur either in the form of widely dispersed individuals, or as small colonial groups with interconnected root systems. This tree is typically found in floodplains and river valleys, but is also sometimes seen on rocky hillsides and limestone woods. In the northeastern part of its range, seemingly natural groves of this tree are actually associated with known prehistoric village sites. In some parts of its range, this tree may be used as an indicator of the presence of limestone or of calcareous soils.

The Kentucky coffeetree is considered an example of an evolutionary anachronism. The tough, leathery seed pods are too difficult for many extant animals to chew through (in addition to being poisonous) and they are too heavy for either wind or water dispersal. It has been hypothesized that the tree would have been browsed upon by now-extinct mammalian megafauna, which ate the pods and nicked the seeds with their large teeth, aiding in germination. This behavior is seen among African elephants eating Fabaceae relatives in Africa. Because of this, its prehistoric range may have been much larger than it has been in historical times. Today, in the wild, it only grows well in wetlands, and it is thought that only in such wet conditions can the seed pods rot away to allow germination in the absence of large herbivores. It is protected in some but not all parts of the Canadian province of Ontario.

== Uses ==
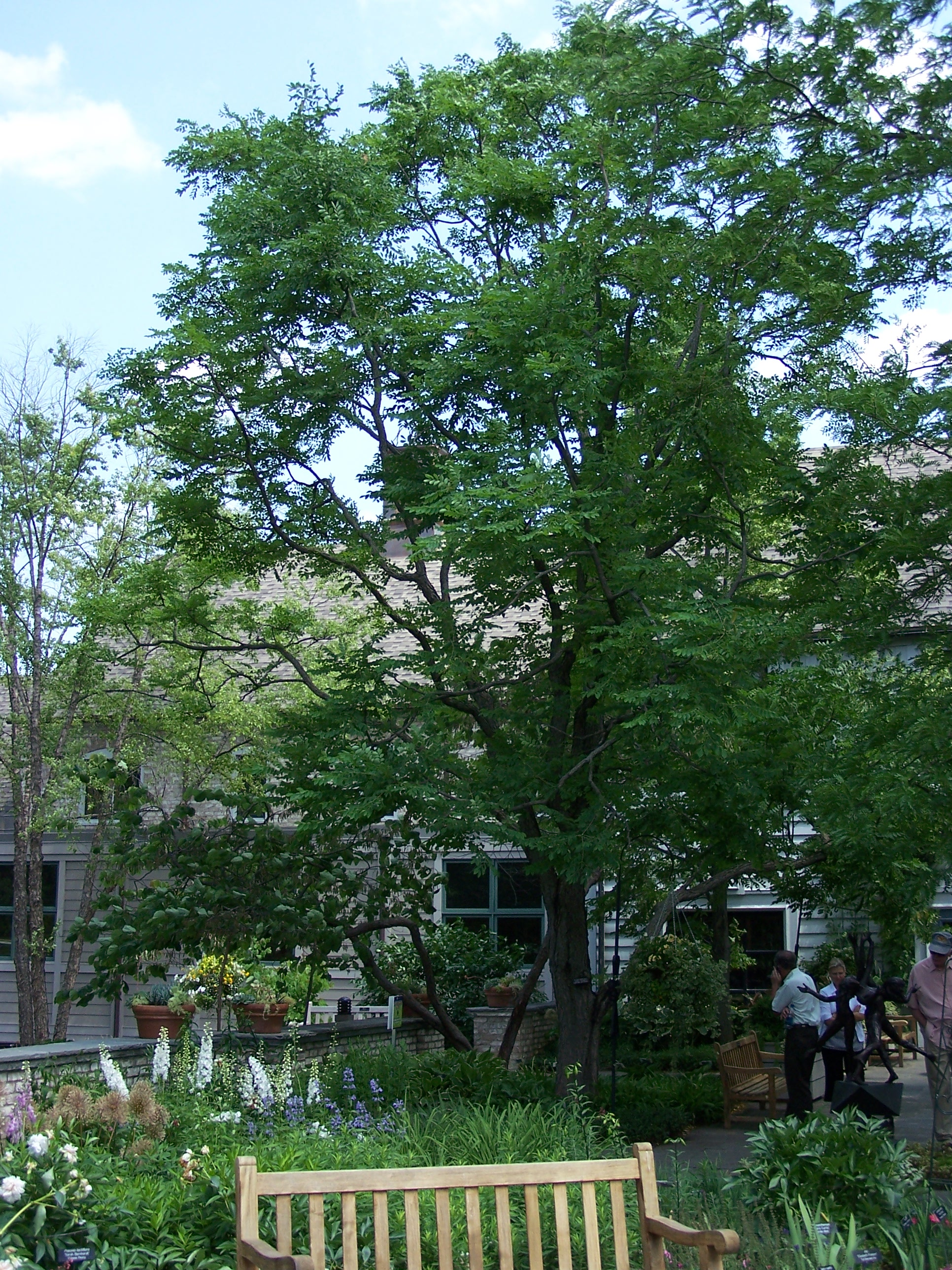
Kentucky coffeetree (upright trunk) at Minnesota Landscape Arboretum

=== Cultivation ===
Gymnocladus dioicus is considered well-suited to urban environments, as it is tolerant of poor soils, has extreme drought tolerance, and is not vulnerable to serious insect infestations or disease problems. It is cultivated by specialty tree plant nurseries as an ornamental tree for planting in gardens and parks. The peculiarly late-emerging and early-dropping leaves, coupled with the fact that the large leaves mean few twigs in the winter profile, make it a tree that is ideal for urban shading where winter sunlight is to be maximized (such as in proximity to solar hot-air systems).

It is often planted because of its unique appearance and interesting character. There are several Kentucky coffeetrees at Mount Vernon, in the gardens along the path leading up to the house of George Washington.

Trees prefer a rich moist soil, such as bottom lands. Their growth is largely unaffected by heat, cold, drought, insects, disease, road salt, ice, and alkaline soil. Kentucky coffeetree is easy to grow from seed. Filing the seedcoat by hand with a small file, and then soaking the seeds in water for 24 hours will ensure rapid germination. Propagation is also easy from dormant root cuttings from December through March.

The Kentucky coffeetree is typically found on "alluvial soils of river and flood plains and nearby terraces". Here it may be locally abundant and form large clonal colonies, reproducing by shoots sprouting from roots.

=== Food ===
The beans of the tree were eaten, after roasting, in the Meskwaki (Fox), Ho-Chunk (Winnebago) and Pawnee Native American cultures.

The Meskwaki also drank the roasted ground seeds in a hot beverage similar to coffee. The common name "coffeetree" derives from this latter use of the roasted seeds, which was imitated by settlers because it seemed a substitute for coffee, especially in times of poverty, similar to chicory. The European colonialists, however, considered it inferior to real coffee:

When Kentucky was first settled by the adventurous pioneers from the Atlantic states who commenced their career in the primeval wilderness, almost without the necessaries of life, except as they produced them from the fertile soil, they fancied that they had discovered a substitute for coffee in the seeds of this tree; and accordingly the name of coffee-tree was bestowed upon it. But when communication was established with the sea-ports, they gladly relinquished their Kentucky beverage for the more grateful flavor of the Indian berry; and no use is at present made of it in that manner.

— Andrew Jackson Downing

The roasted seeds can be eaten like sweet chestnuts. Usefully, the fruits can be collected and picked up from the tree or ground at any time during fall, winter, and spring.

==== Toxicity ====
Caution should be used when consuming, as unroasted or only partially roasted beans and pods are considered poisonous and are reputed to contain the alkaloid cytisine. The pods, preserved like those of the tamarind, can be eaten and are slightly aperient (laxative). Many sources claim that roasting the seeds for a certain length of time can reduce or eliminate the cytisine thought to be in them, but this is not based on scientific evidence. There are however, many anecdotal accounts of people drinking a coffee-like drink made from the seeds without suffering any adverse health effects, although most reported the taste to be unpleasant.

The plant is toxic to some animals and may intoxicate dogs.

=== Culture ===
In addition to use as a food, the seeds of Kentucky coffeetree were used by Native Americans for ceremonial and recreational purposes. Seeds were used as dice in games of chance that were common in eastern tribes. It is likely that indigenous community members carved patterns on coffeetree seeds used in ceremonial dice games, which also served to scarify the seeds and prepare them for germination. The seeds were also used in jewelry. The importance of the Kentucky coffeetree to Native Americans undoubtedly contributed to its dispersal.

Gymnocladus dioicus is used as a street tree as far north as Québec City, Québec. It resists harsh winters and de-icing salts.

=== Woodworking ===
The wood is used both by cabinetmakers and carpenters. It has very little sapwood.

== Notable specimens ==
A specimen with a height of 26 metres (85 ft) was referenced in La Turpinerie, commune of Geay, a short distance from the Charente in south-west France, growing in a typical calcareous soil (see Minutes of Congrès international de sylviculture de Paris, June 1900). Cut during the 20th century, it had a circumference of 2.8 metres (9 ft 2 in) and was the tallest in the country at this time.

A Kentucky coffeetree, said to have been brought to the UK in 1812, stands in Mountsfield Park in the London Borough of Lewisham.

A Kentucky coffeetree found in the Will Rogers Park in Amarillo, Texas has been confirmed by Texas A&M Forest Service to be the largest of its kind in Texas. It has a circumference of 92 inches, a height of 51 feet, and a crown spread of 52 feet.

In 2022, the Tree Board for the town of Hillsborough, North Carolina, selected a grove of Kentucky coffeetrees as its 2022 Treasure Tree. Originally the grove was mis-identified as a part of a program to remove invasive species, but the North Carolina Forest Service helped to confirm the proper identification of the trees.

The largest Kentucky coffeetree in New Hampshire, at 91 ft tall, is on the campus of Dartmouth College.

Kentucky coffeetrees can be found in Central Park in New York City.
