= Ann Arbor, Michigan =

City in Michigan, United States

Ann Arbor
- City
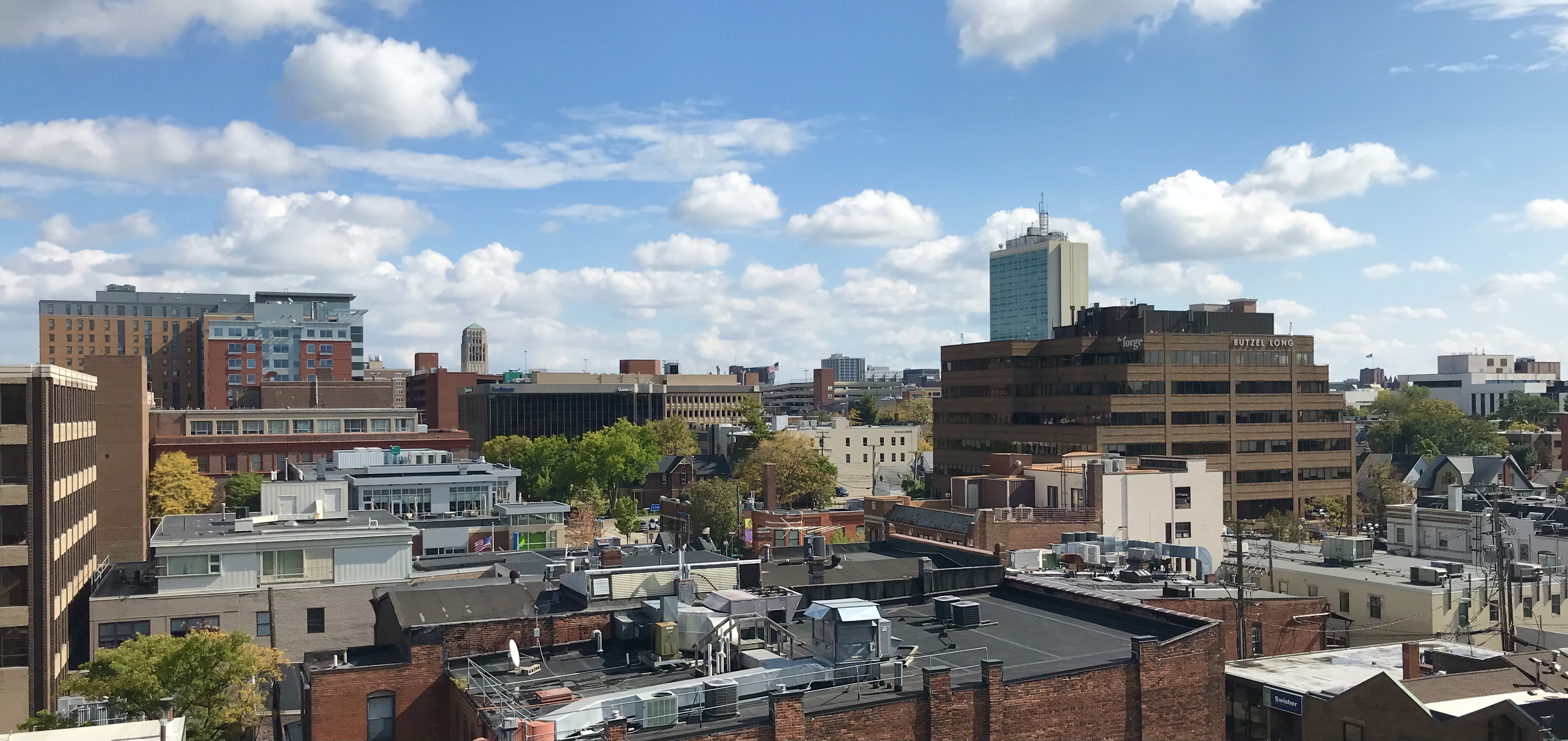
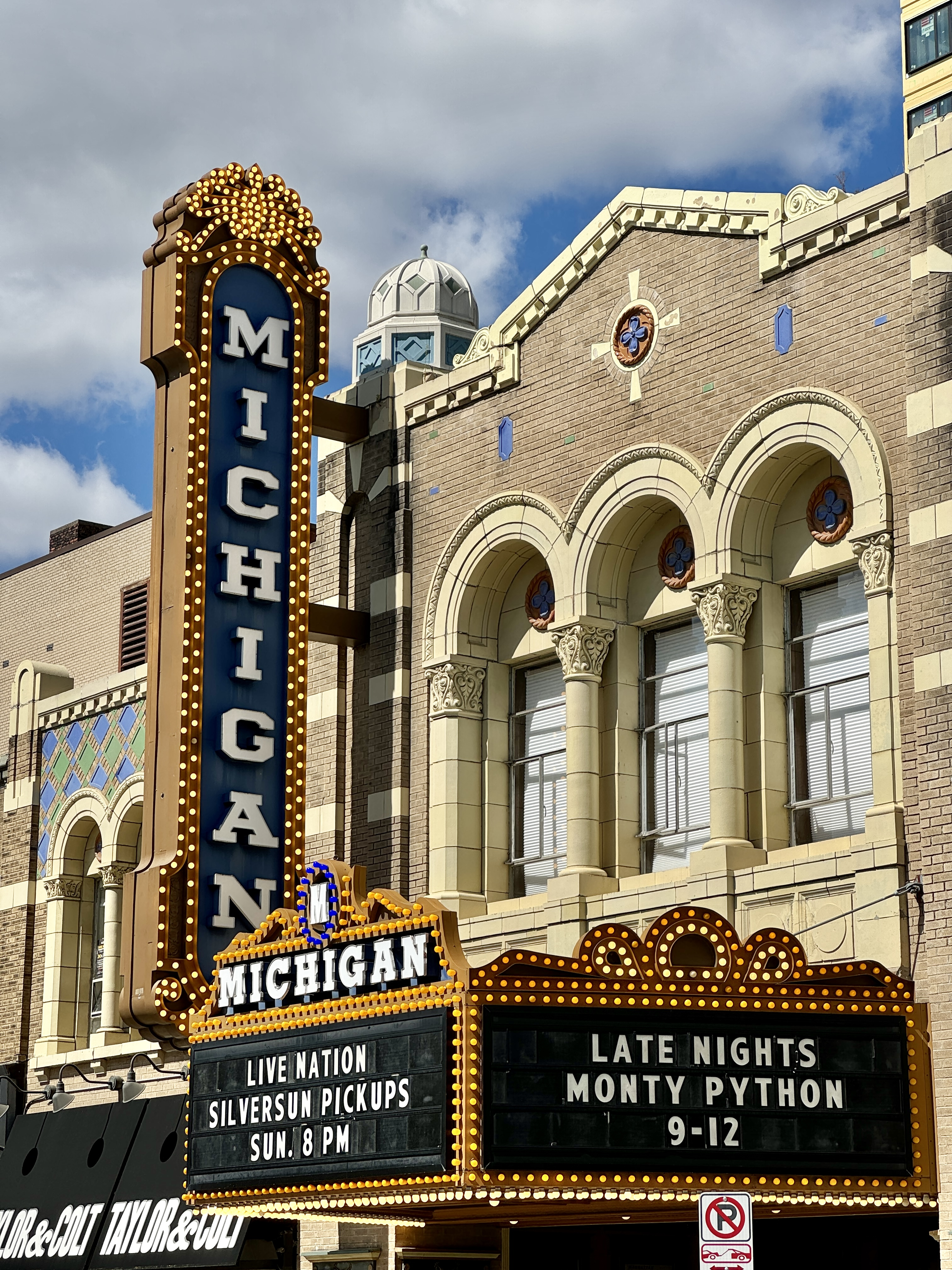
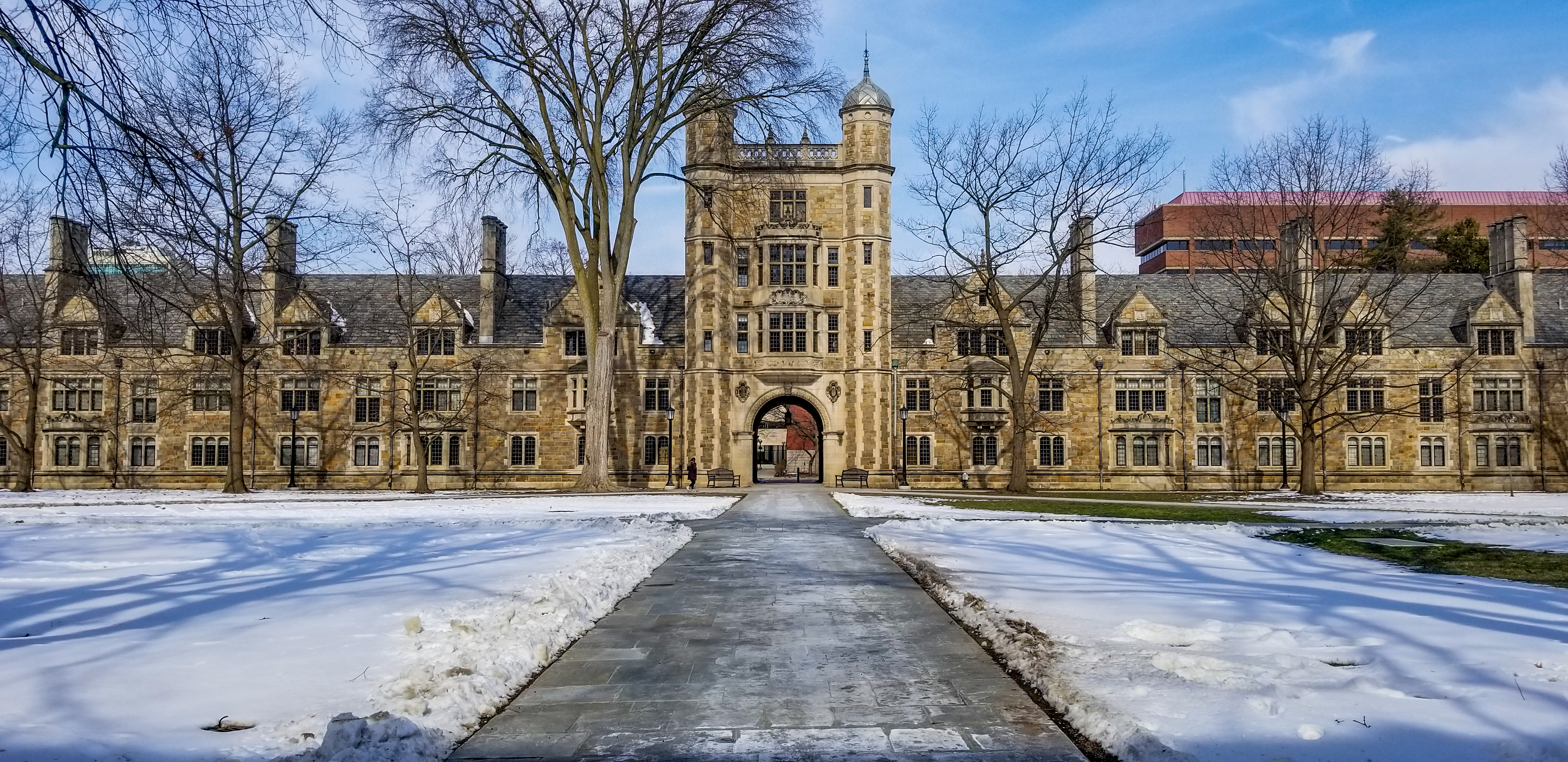
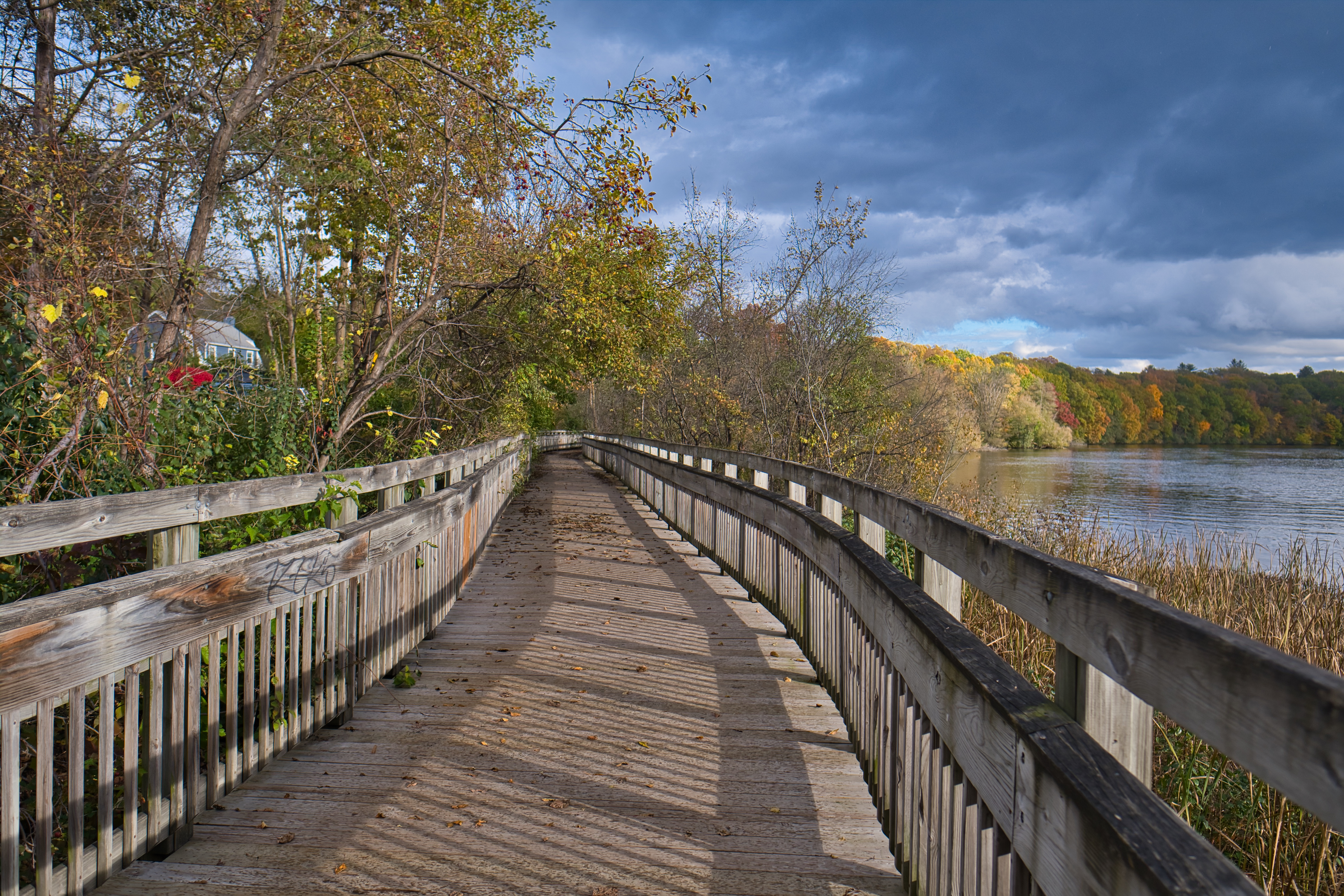
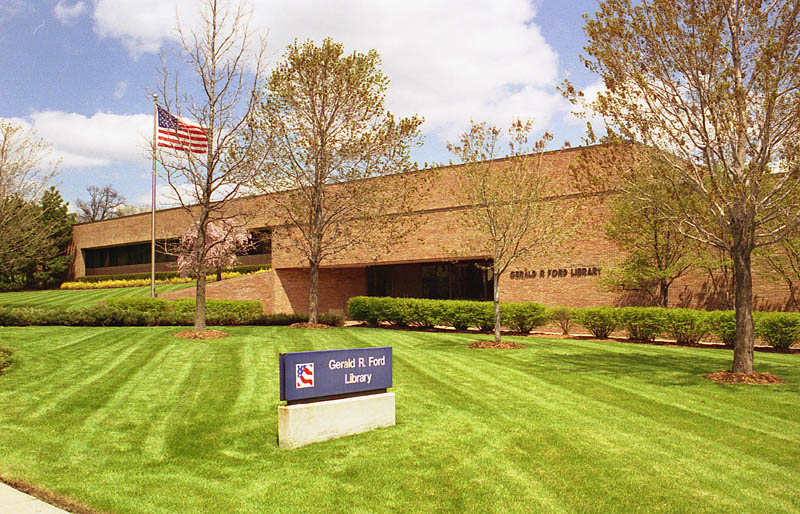
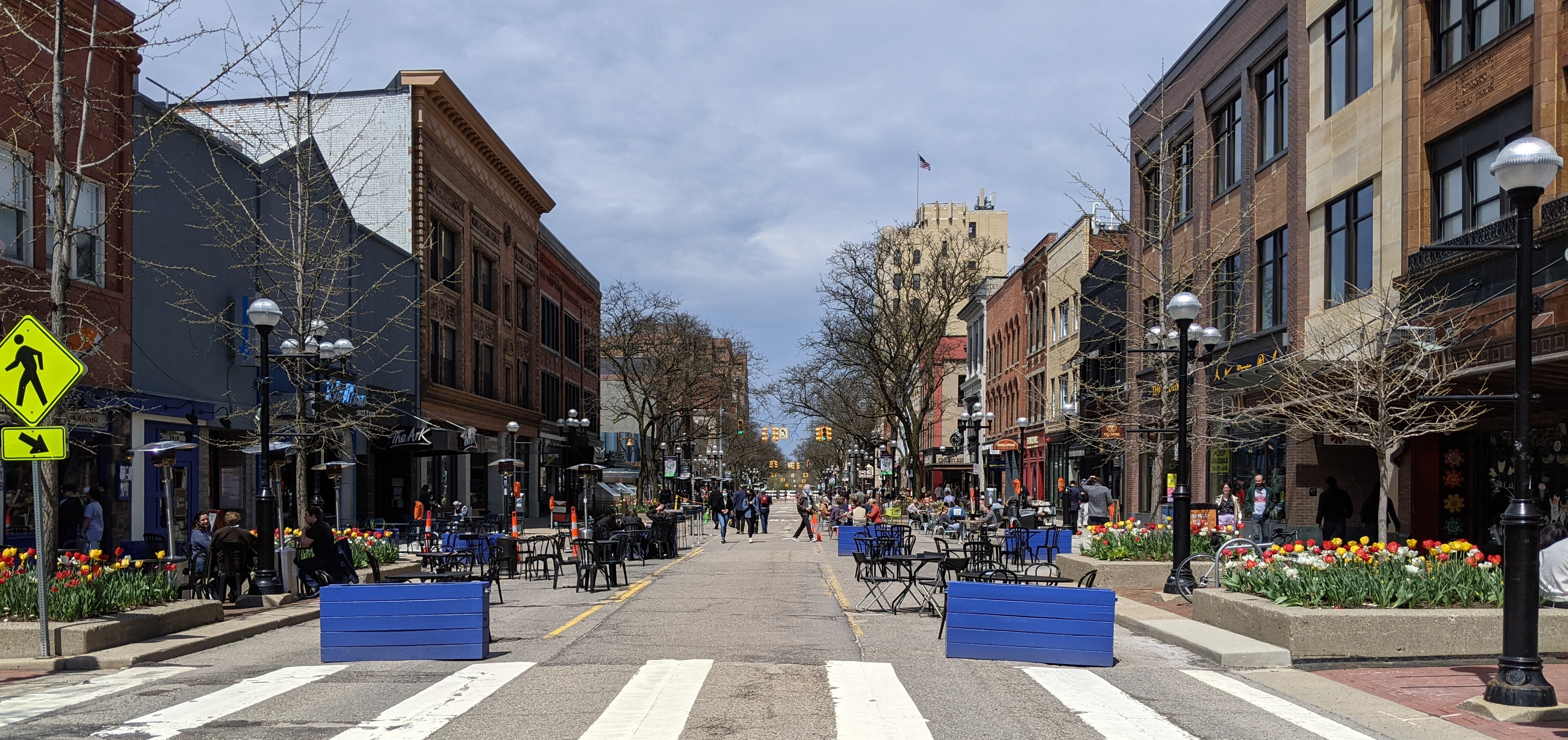
- Skyline, towards the southeast Michigan Theater University of Michigan Huron River Boardwalk Gerald R. Ford Presidential Library Pedestrianized Main Street

- Flag Seal
- Nicknames: A^{2}, A2, Tree Town, People's Republic of Ann Arbor
- Interactive map of Ann Arbor
- Location within Michigan Location within the United States
- Coordinates: 42°16′53″N 83°44′54″W
- Country: United States
- State: Michigan
- County: Washtenaw
- Founded: 1824
- Incorporated: 1833 (village); 1851 (city)
- Founder: John Allen and Elisha Rumsey
- Named for: The wives of the city's founders (both named Ann) and the bur oak in the area

Government
  - Type: Council–manager
  - Mayor: Christopher Taylor (D)
  - Administrator: Milton Dohoney
  - Clerk: Jacqueline Beaudry
  - City council: Members: Christopher Taylor; Cynthia Harrison; Linh Song; Christopher Watson; Travis Radina; Ayesha Ghazi Edwin; Jen Eyer; Dharma Akmon; Jenn Cornell; Erica Briggs; Lisa Disch

Area
  - City: 29.09 sq mi (75.35 km^{2})
  - Land: 28.22 sq mi (73.10 km^{2})
  - Water: 0.87 sq mi (2.25 km^{2})
  - Urban: 159.64 sq mi (413.46 km^{2})
  - Metro: 720 sq mi (1,870 km^{2})
- Elevation: 840 ft (256 m)

Population (2020)
  - City: 123,851
  - Estimate (2024): 122,925
  - Rank: 231st in the United States; 5th in Michigan
  - Density: 4,388.2/sq mi (1,694.28/km^{2})
  - Urban: 317,689 (US: 129th)
  - Urban density: 2,210/sq mi (855/km^{2})
  - Metro: 372,258 (US: 148th)
  - Metro density: 517/sq mi (200/km^{2})
- Demonym: Ann Arborite

GDP
  - Metro: $30.556 billion (2022)
- Time zone: UTC−5 (Eastern (EST))
  - Summer (DST): UTC−4 (EDT)
- ZIP code(s): 48103–48109, 48113
- Area code: 734
- FIPS code: 26-03000
- GNIS feature ID: 0620133
- Website: a2gov.org

Ann Arbor is a city in Washtenaw County, Michigan, United States. The county seat, it had a population of 123,851 in 2020, making it the fifth-most populous city in Michigan.

The city is home to the University of Michigan, the oldest university in the state. Its economy is primarily focused on high technology, with numerous startup companies drawn to the area due to the university's robust research and development activities.

Founded in 1824 with American settlers from the East Coast, it was incorporated as a city in 1851. Located on the Huron River, Ann Arbor is the principal city of its metropolitan area, and it is also included in the Detroit–Warren–Ann Arbor combined statistical area and that of Great Lakes megalopolis.

== History ==
=== Before founding as Ann Arbor ===
The region was once inhabited by several Native American tribes, the most prominent being the Anishinaabe people of the Three Fires: the Odawa, Ojibwe, and Potawatomi. The Potawatomi founded two villages in the area of what is now Ann Arbor in about 1774. Other tribes that inhabited the area included the Wyandots and Sauk. These peoples established several trails that converged on present-day Ann Arbor. The land that included Washtenaw County was ceded to the U.S. by the Odawa, Ojibwe, Potawatomi, and Wyandot in the Treaty of Detroit of 1807.

=== 19th century ===
Ann Arbor was founded in 1824 by land speculators John Allen and Elisha Walker Rumsey. On May 25, 1824, the town plat was registered with Wayne County as the Village of Annarbour, the earliest known use of the town's name. Allen and Rumsey decided to name it for their wives, both named Ann, and for the stands of bur oak in the 640 acres (260 ha) of land they purchased for $800 (equivalent to $29,000 in 2025) from the federal government at $1.25 per acre. The local Ojibwa named the settlement kaw-goosh-kaw-nick, after the sound of Allen's sawmill.

Ann Arbor became the seat of Washtenaw County in 1827 and was incorporated as a village in 1833. The Ann Arbor Land Company, a group of speculators, set aside 40 acres (16 ha) of undeveloped land and offered it to the state of Michigan as the site of the state capitol, but lost the bid to Lansing. In 1837, the property was accepted instead as the site of the University of Michigan.

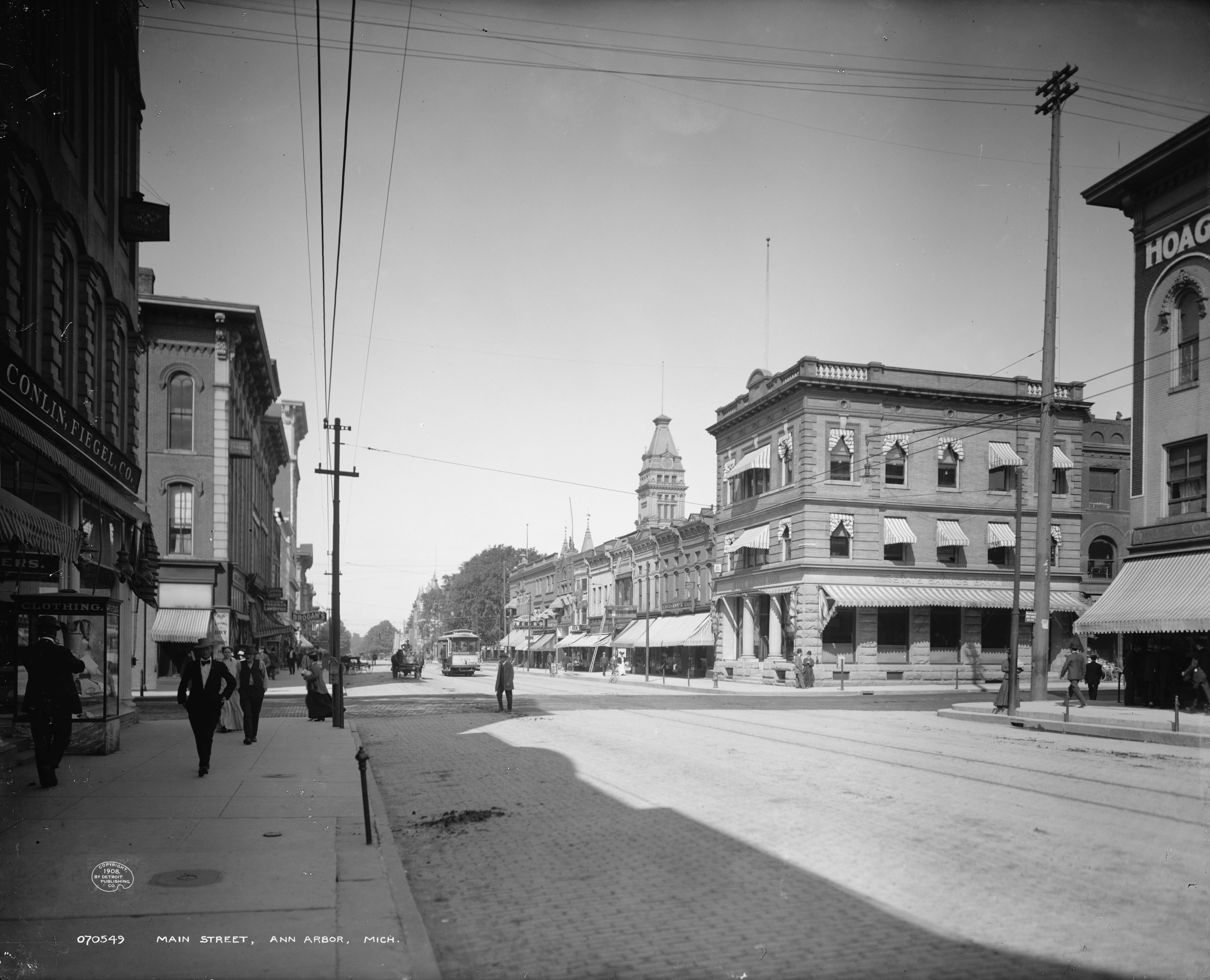
Main Street in Ann Arbor c. 1908

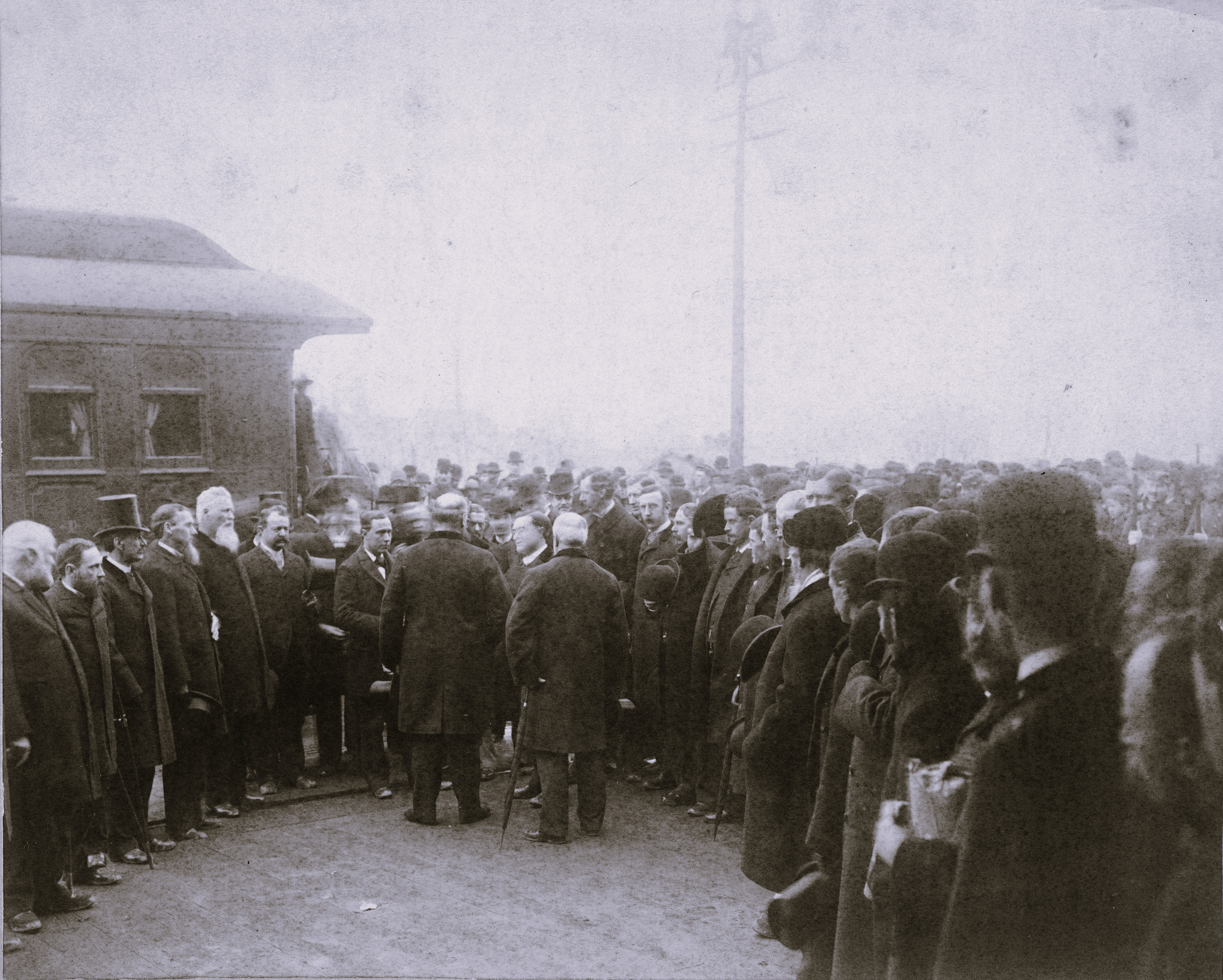
President Grover Cleveland at the Ann Arbor station in 1892, with a crowd that included Mayor William Doty and University President James B. Angell

Since the university's establishment in the city in 1837, the histories of the University of Michigan and Ann Arbor have been closely linked. The town became a regional transportation hub in 1839 with the arrival of the Michigan Central Railroad, and a north–south railway connecting Ann Arbor to Toledo and other markets to the south was established in 1878. Throughout the 1840s and the 1850s settlers continued to come to Ann Arbor. While the earlier settlers were primarily of British ancestry, the newer settlers also consisted of Germans, Irish, and Black people. In 1851, Ann Arbor was chartered as a city, though the city showed a drop in population during the Depression of 1873. It was not until the early 1880s that Ann Arbor again saw robust growth, with new immigrants from Greece, Italy, Russia, and Poland.

=== 20th century ===
Ann Arbor saw increased growth in manufacturing, especially in milling. Ann Arbor's Jewish community also grew after the turn of the 20th century, and its first synagogue, Beth Israel Congregation, was established in 1916.

Following a 1956 vote, the city of East Ann Arbor merged with Ann Arbor to encompass the eastern sections of the city.

In 1960, Ann Arbor voters approved a $2.3 million bond issue (equivalent to $19.2 million in 2025) to build a new city hall, which was designed by architect Alden B. Dow. The City Hall opened in 1963. In 1995, the building was renamed the Guy C. Larcom Jr. Municipal Building in honor of the longtime city administrator who championed the building's construction.

During the 1960s and 1970s, the city gained a reputation as an important center for liberalism (liberal politics), and a locus for left-wing activism, anti-Vietnam War activism, and student activism. The first major meetings of the national left-wing campus group Students for a Democratic Society occurred in Ann Arbor in 1960; in 1965, the city was home to the first U.S. teach-in against the Vietnam War. During the ensuing 15 years, many countercultural and New Left enterprises sprang up and developed large constituencies within the city. These influences washed into municipal politics during the early and mid-1970s when three members of the Human Rights Party (HRP) won city council seats on the strength of the student vote. During their time on the council, HRP representatives fought for measures including pioneering antidiscrimination ordinances, measures decriminalizing marijuana possession, and a rent-control ordinance.

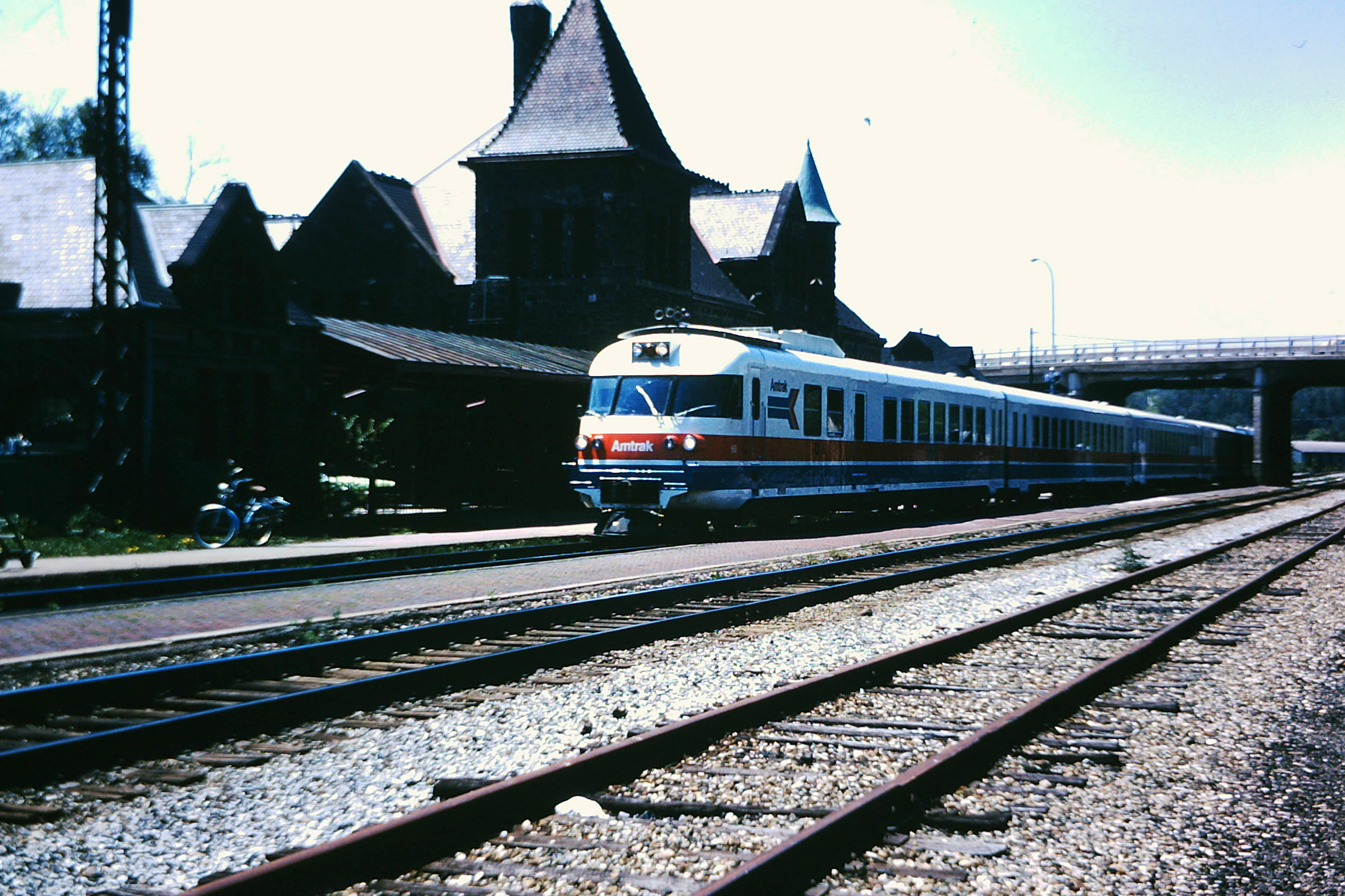
Ann Arbor station in 1975

Two religious-conservative institutions were created in Ann Arbor; the Word of God (established in 1967), a charismatic inter-denominational movement; and the Thomas More Law Center (established in 1999). Since 1998, Ann Arbor is also the home office of the Anthroposophical Society in the United States, an organization dedicated to supporting the community of those interested in the inner path of schooling known as anthroposophy, developed by Rudolf Steiner.

From 1967 to its closing in 1990, Ann Arbor hosted KMS Fusion, the world's first company to pursue fusion power via the inertial confinement fusion method.

=== 21st century ===
In the past several decades, Ann Arbor has grappled with the effects of sharply rising land values, gentrification, and urban sprawl stretching into outlying countryside. On November 4, 2003, voters approved a greenbelt plan under which the city government bought development rights on agricultural parcels of land adjacent to Ann Arbor to preserve them from sprawling development. Since then, a vociferous local debate has hinged on how and whether to accommodate and guide development within city limits. Ann Arbor consistently ranks in the "top places to live" lists published by various mainstream media outlets every year.

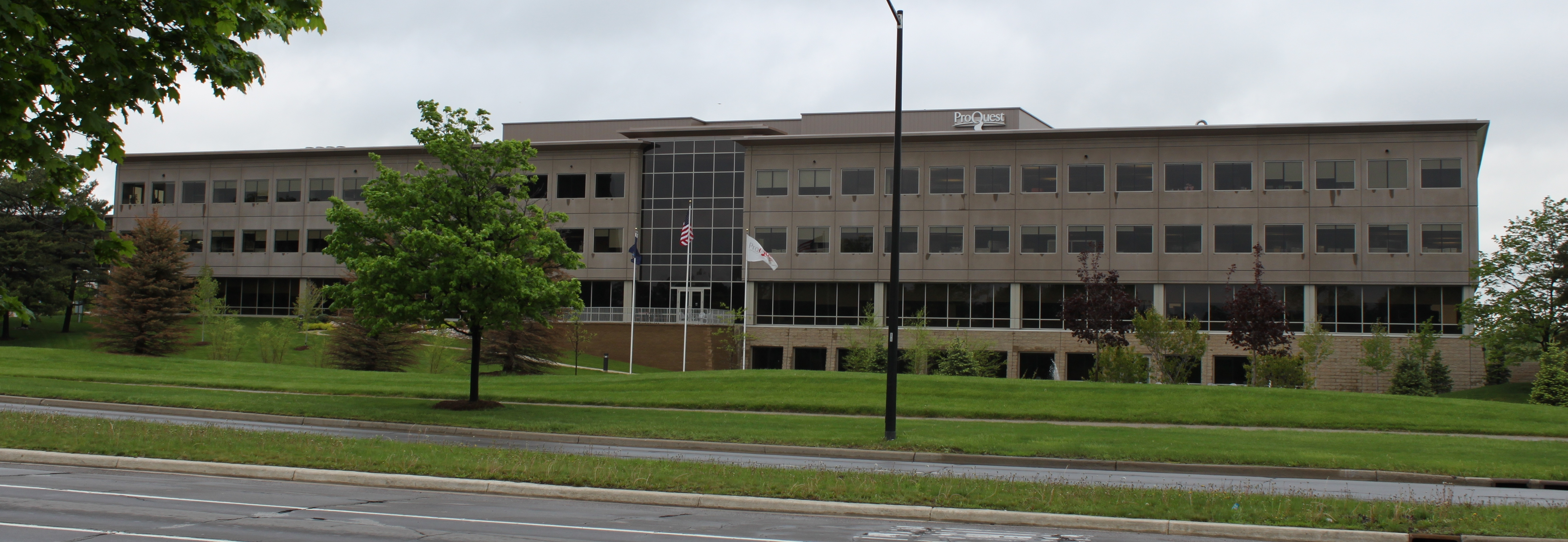
ProQuest's headquarters on Eisenhower Parkway in Ann Arbor

In 2016, the city changed mayoral terms from two years to four. Until 2017, City Council held annual elections in which half of the seats (one from each ward) were elected to 2-year terms. These elections were staggered, with each ward having one of its seats up for election in odd years and its other seat up for election in even years. Beginning in 2018 the city council has had staggered elections to 4-year terms in even years. This means that half of the members (one from each ward) are elected in presidential election years, while the other half are elected in mid-term election years. To facilitate this change in scheduling, the 2017 election elected members to terms that lasted 3-years.

In 2020, partly as a response to the COVID-19 pandemic, the city government opened several downtown streets to pedestrians, limiting their use by motor vehicles to emergency vehicles during summertime weekends. In addition to providing a large pedestrian mall, these changes allow restaurants to use more of the sidewalks and part of the street for outdoor seating. These changes were popular enough that in 2021 the city council extended the dates from March to November, continuing the schedule of cordoning off cars from Thursday evening until Monday morning.

== Geography ==
Ann Arbor is located along the Huron River, which flows southeast through the city on its way to Lake Erie. It is the central core of the Ann Arbor, MI Metropolitan Statistical Area, which consists of the whole of Washtenaw County, but is also a part of Metro Detroit. While it borders only townships, the built-up nature of the sections of Pittsfield and Ypsilanti townships between Ann Arbor and the city of Ypsilanti make the two effectively a single urban area.

=== Landscape ===
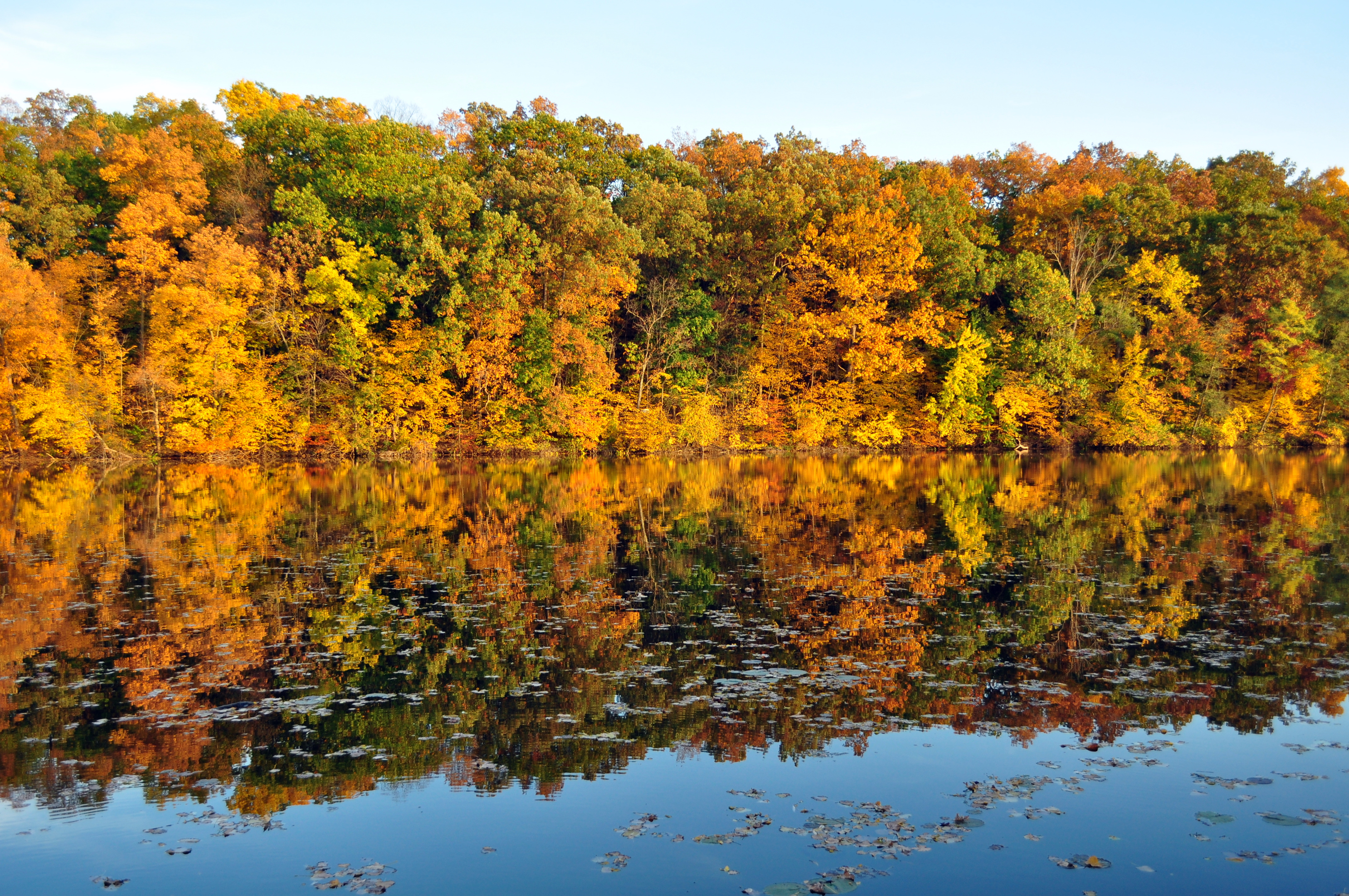
Huron River

The landscape of Ann Arbor consists of hills and valleys, with the terrain becoming steeper near the Huron River. The elevation ranges from about 750 feet (230 m) along the Huron River to 1,015 feet (309 m) on the city's west side, near the intersection of Maple Road and Pauline Blvd. Ann Arbor Municipal Airport, which is south of the city at 42°13.38′N 83°44.74′W, has an elevation of 839 feet (256 m). Ann Arbor is nicknamed "Tree Town", both due to its name and to the dense forestation of its parks and residential areas. The city contains more than 50,000 trees along its streets and an equal number in parks. Into the early 2000s, the emerald ash borer has destroyed many of the city's approximately 10,500 ash trees.

The city contains over 160 municipal parks ranging from small neighborhood green spots to large recreation areas such as Buhr Park. Several large city parks and a university park border sections of the Huron River. Fuller Recreation Area, near the University Hospital complex, contains sports fields, pedestrian and bike paths, and swimming pools. Opened in the summer of 2014, the city-funded Ann Arbor Skatepark is a 30,000 sq ft (2,787.1 m^{2}) skatepark located within Veterans Memorial Park. The city is also home to the Washtenaw County-owned County Farm Park. The Nichols Arboretum, owned by the University of Michigan, is a 123-acre (50 ha) arboretum that contains hundreds of plant and tree species. It is on the city's east side, near the university's Central Campus. Located across the Huron River just beyond the university's North Campus is the university's Matthaei Botanical Gardens, which contains 300 acres of gardens and a large tropical conservatory. Several other green spaces around Ann Arbor are privately owned or owned by government agencies such as Ann Arbor Public Schools.

=== Cityscape ===
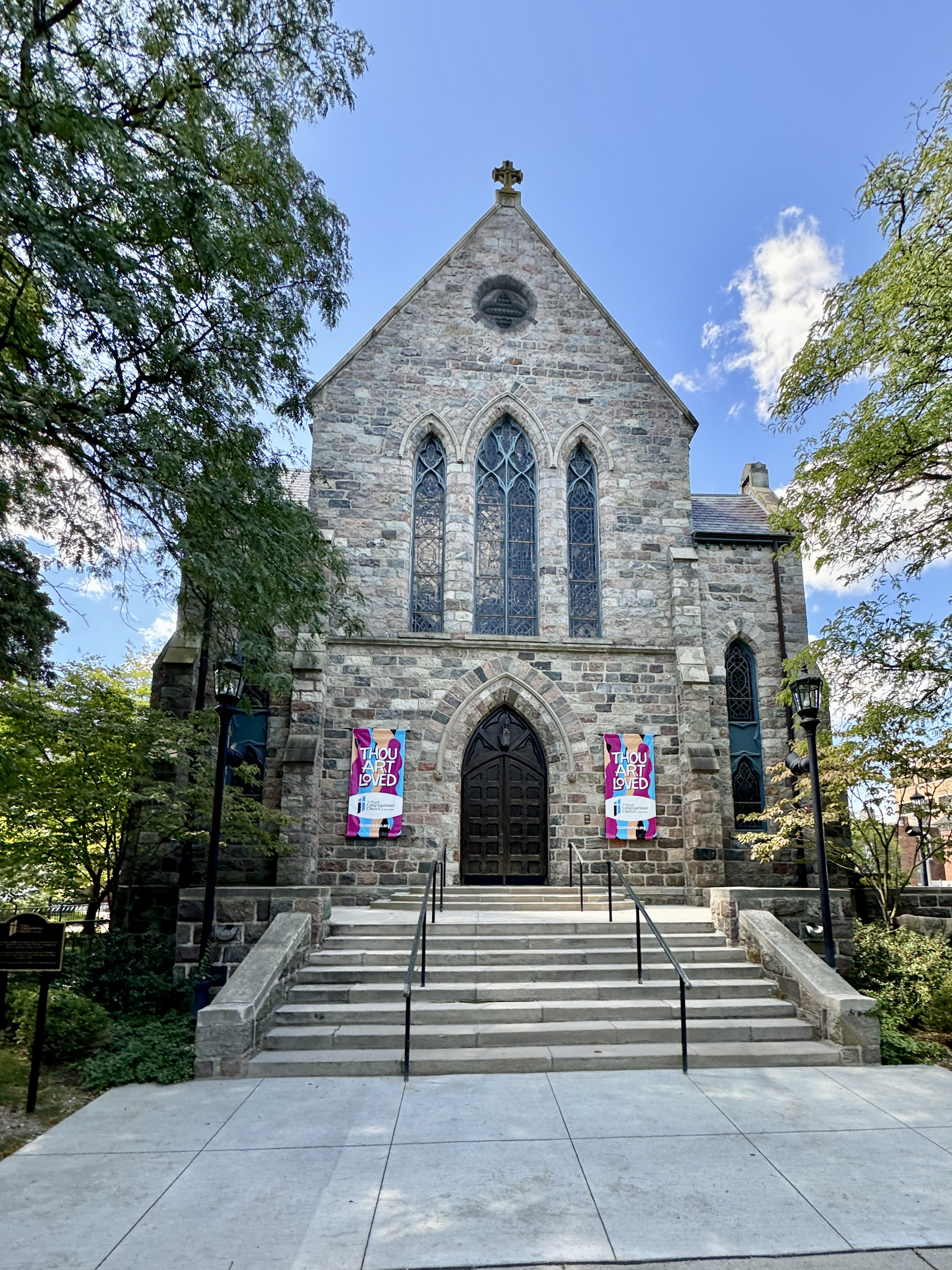
First Congregational Church

The cityscape of Ann Arbor is heavily influenced by the University of Michigan, with 22% of downtown and 9.4% of the total land owned by the university. The downtown Central Campus contains some of the oldest extant structures in the city—including the President's House, built in 1840—and separates the South University District from the other three downtown commercial districts. These other three districts, Kerrytown, State Street, and Main Street are contiguous near the northwestern corner of the university.

Major landmarks in downtown Ann Arbor include the Michigan Theater, The Diag, and Tower Plaza, a 26-story condominium building that is the city's tallest building. Downtown is also home to several Fairy Doors and other public art installations.

Three commercial areas south of downtown include the areas near I-94 and Ann Arbor-Saline Road, Briarwood Mall, and the South Industrial area. Other commercial areas include the Arborland/Washtenaw Avenue and Packard Road merchants on the east side, the Plymouth Road area in the northeast, and the Westgate/West Stadium areas on the west side. Downtown contains a mix of 19th- and early-20th-century structures and modern-style buildings, as well as a farmers' market in the Kerrytown district. The city's commercial districts are composed mostly of two- to four-story structures, although downtown and the area near Briarwood Mall contain a small number of high-rise buildings.

Ann Arbor's residential neighborhoods contain architectural styles ranging from classic 19th- and early 20th-century designs to ranch-style houses. Among these homes are a number of kit houses built in the early 20th century. Contemporary-style houses are farther from the downtown district. Surrounding the University of Michigan campus are houses and apartment complexes occupied primarily by student renters. The 19th-century buildings and streetscape of the Old West Side neighborhood have been preserved virtually intact; in 1972, the district was listed on the National Register of Historic Places (NRHP), and it is further protected by city ordinances and a nonprofit preservation group.

=== Climate ===
Ann Arbor has a typically Midwestern humid continental climate (Köppen Dfa), which is influenced by the Great Lakes. There are four distinct seasons: winters are cold and snowy, with average highs around 34 °F (1 °C). Summers are warm to hot and humid, with average highs around 81 °F (27 °C) and with slightly more precipitation. Spring and autumn are transitional between the two. The area experiences lake effect weather, primarily in the form of increased cloudiness during late fall and early winter. The monthly daily average temperature in July is 72.6 °F (22.6 °C), while the same figure for January is 24.5 °F (−4.2 °C). Temperatures reach or exceed 90 °F (32 °C) on 10 days, and drop to or below 0 °F (−18 °C) on 4.6 nights. Precipitation tends to be the heaviest during the summer months, but most frequent during winter. Snowfall, which normally occurs from November to April but occasionally starts in October, averages 58 inches (147 cm) per season. The lowest recorded temperature was −23 °F (−31 °C) on February 11, 1885, and the highest recorded temperature was 105 °F (41 °C) on July 24, 1934.

Climate data for Ann Arbor, Michigan (UMich) (1991–2020 normals, extremes 1881–present)
Month	Jan	Feb	Mar	Apr	May	Jun	Jul	Aug	Sep	Oct	Nov	Dec	Year
Record high °F (°C)	72 (22)	73 (23)	85 (29)	88 (31)	95 (35)	103 (39)	105 (41)	104 (40)	99 (37)	91 (33)	78 (26)	67 (19)	105 (41)
Mean maximum °F (°C)	51.7 (10.9)	53.7 (12.1)	68.2 (20.1)	78.0 (25.6)	86.4 (30.2)	91.7 (33.2)	92.7 (33.7)	91.4 (33.0)	88.7 (31.5)	80.5 (26.9)	65.5 (18.6)	54.3 (12.4)	94.3 (34.6)
Mean daily maximum °F (°C)	31.9 (−0.1)	35.4 (1.9)	46.2 (7.9)	59.7 (15.4)	71.4 (21.9)	80.1 (26.7)	83.7 (28.7)	81.7 (27.6)	75.1 (23.9)	62.2 (16.8)	48.0 (8.9)	36.3 (2.4)	59.3 (15.2)
Daily mean °F (°C)	24.0 (−4.4)	26.5 (−3.1)	35.7 (2.1)	47.6 (8.7)	59.0 (15.0)	68.0 (20.0)	71.9 (22.2)	70.3 (21.3)	63.3 (17.4)	51.4 (10.8)	39.2 (4.0)	29.2 (−1.6)	48.8 (9.3)
Mean daily minimum °F (°C)	16.2 (−8.8)	17.7 (−7.9)	25.2 (−3.8)	35.5 (1.9)	46.6 (8.1)	55.9 (13.3)	60.1 (15.6)	58.8 (14.9)	51.6 (10.9)	40.7 (4.8)	30.5 (−0.8)	22.1 (−5.5)	38.4 (3.6)
Mean minimum °F (°C)	−1.5 (−18.6)	1.1 (−17.2)	8.5 (−13.1)	22.8 (−5.1)	33.9 (1.1)	43.7 (6.5)	50.3 (10.2)	49.5 (9.7)	38.4 (3.6)	28.6 (−1.9)	17.2 (−8.2)	6.2 (−14.3)	−5.6 (−20.9)
Record low °F (°C)	−22 (−30)	−23 (−31)	−8 (−22)	7 (−14)	20 (−7)	35 (2)	37 (3)	39 (4)	27 (−3)	19 (−7)	−3 (−19)	−20 (−29)	−23 (−31)
Average precipitation inches (mm)	2.96 (75)	2.51 (64)	2.82 (72)	3.44 (87)	3.84 (98)	3.91 (99)	3.52 (89)	3.52 (89)	3.18 (81)	2.99 (76)	2.82 (72)	2.75 (70)	38.26 (972)
Average snowfall inches (cm)	18.3 (46)	15.3 (39)	8.3 (21)	2.6 (6.6)	0.0 (0.0)	0.0 (0.0)	0.0 (0.0)	0.0 (0.0)	0.0 (0.0)	0.1 (0.25)	4.1 (10)	12.7 (32)	61.4 (156)
Average extreme snow depth inches (cm)	8.0 (20)	7.9 (20)	4.7 (12)	0.9 (2.3)	0.0 (0.0)	0.0 (0.0)	0.0 (0.0)	0.0 (0.0)	0.0 (0.0)	0.0 (0.0)	1.6 (4.1)	5.1 (13)	10.3 (26)
Average precipitation days (≥ 0.01 in)	18.3	14.4	14.3	14.4	14.7	12.4	11.7	11.2	10.6	13.3	13.5	16.9	165.7
Average snowy days (≥ 0.1 in)	15.2	12.1	7.5	2.8	0.1	0.0	0.0	0.0	0.0	0.4	4.9	11.5	54.5
Source: NOAA

== Demographics ==
Historical population
Census	Pop.	Note	%±
1860	5,097		—
1870	7,363		44.5%
1880	8,061		9.5%
1890	9,431		17.0%
1900	14,509		53.8%
1910	14,817		2.1%
1920	19,516		31.7%
1930	26,944		38.1%
1940	29,815		10.7%
1950	48,251		61.8%
1960	67,340		39.6%
1970	100,035		48.6%
1980	107,969		7.9%
1990	109,592		1.5%
2000	114,024		4.0%
2010	113,934		−0.1%
2020	123,851		8.7%
2024 (est.)	122,925		−0.7%
Before 1860; 1900–2000; U.S. Census Bureau

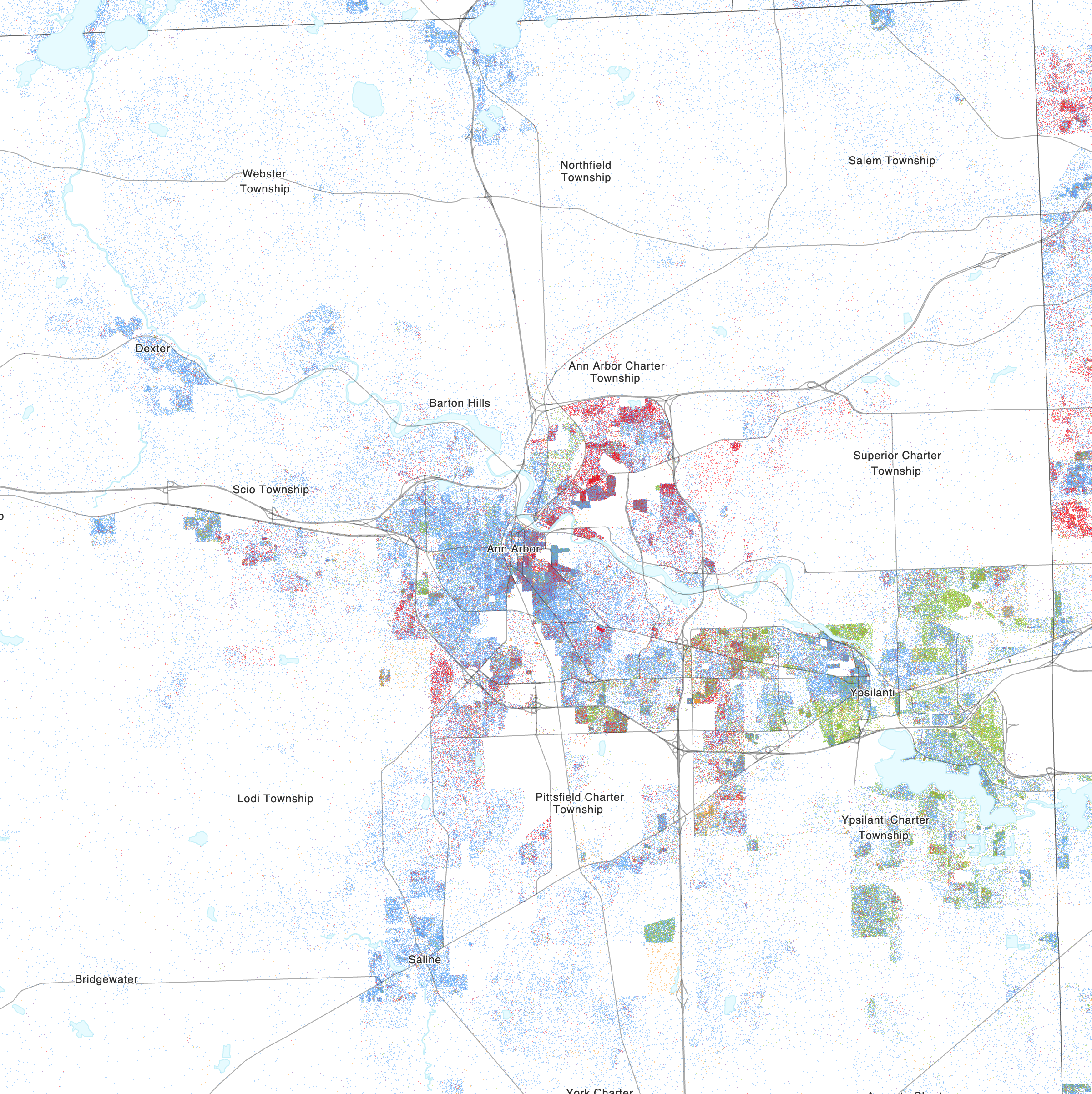
Map of racial distribution in Ann Arbor, 2020 U.S. census. Each dot is one person: ⬤ White ⬤ Black ⬤ Asian ⬤ Hispanic ⬤ Multiracial ⬤ Native American/Other

Ann Arbor has seen consistent growth in population between all decennial censuses since 1860 with the exception of the 2010 census which reported almost no growth from the previous census. As of the 2020 U.S. census, there were 123,851 people and 49,337 households residing in the city, with a population density of 4,391.9 inhabitants per square mile (1,695.7/km^{2}). The racial makeup of the city including Hispanics in the racial categories was 67.6% White, 6.8% Black, 0.2% Native American, 15.7% Asian, 0.1% Native Hawaiian or Pacific Islander, 1.8% from other races, and 7.9% from two or more races. Hispanic or Latino residents of any race made up 5.5% of the population. Ann Arbor has a small population of Arab Americans, including students as well as local Lebanese and Palestinians, and a large community of Japanese nationals.

According to the 2022 American Community Survey estimates, out of 49,337 households, 33.8% were married-couple households, 9.8% were cohabiting couple households, 26.1% had a male householder with no spouse present, and 30.4% had a female householder with no spouse present. 18.4% of the households had individuals under the age of 18 living in them, and 20.1% had individuals over age 65 living in them. The average household size was 2.22 people and the average family size was 2.78 people. The median age was 25.9; 12.2% of the population was under age 18, and 12.3% was age 65 or older. The percentage of city residents age 25 years or older with at least a high school degree was 97.8% while 77.5% had a bachelor's degree or higher, which is higher than the U.S. national percentage of 89.1% for persons age 25 years or older with at least a high school degree and 34.3% with a bachelor's degree or higher.

The median household income in 2022 was $78,740 (versus the U.S. national figure of $75,149), with family households having a median income of $126,292. The per capita income for the city was $52,276, over 25 percent higher than the U.S. national per capita income of $41,261. Males working full-time jobs had median earnings of $86,970 compared to $61,543 for females. Out of the 109,973 people with a determined poverty status, 23.1% were below the poverty line compared to the U.S. national poverty rate of 11.1%; the age group with the highest percentage below the poverty level was persons between 18 and 34 years at 43.0% while other age groups have percentages between 2.7% and 7.7%. Further, 3.5% of minors and 7.7% of seniors were below the poverty line.

Historical racial composition	2020	2010	1990	1970	1940
White	67.6%	73.0%	82.0%	91%	95.5%
—Non-Hispanic	65.9%	70.4%	80.4%	-	-
Black or African American	6.8%	7.7%	9.0%	6.7%	4.1%
Hispanic or Latino (of any race)	5.5%	4.1%	2.6%	1.3% (Note: From 15% sample.)	-
Asian	15.7%	14.4%	7.7%	1.5%	0.3%

Ann Arbor city, Michigan – Racial and ethnic composition Note: the US Census treats Hispanic/Latino as an ethnic category. This table excludes Latinos from the racial categories and assigns them to a separate category. Hispanics/Latinos may be of any race.
Race / Ethnicity (NH = Non-Hispanic)	Pop 1980	Pop 1990	Pop 2000	Pop 2010	Pop 2020	% 1980	% 1990	% 2000	% 2010	% 2020
White alone (NH)	90,443	88,092	82,975	80,158	81,565	83.77%	80.38%	72.77%	70.35%	65.86%
Black or African American alone (NH)	9,957	9,759	9,906	8,658	8,236	9.22%	8.90%	8.69%	7.60%	6.65%
Native American or Alaska Native alone (NH)	20	352	287	224	130	0.02%	0.32%	0.25%	0.20%	0.10%
Asian alone (NH)	3,894	8,337	13,532	16,293	19,372	3.61%	7.61%	11.87%	14.30%	15.64%
Native Hawaiian or Pacific Islander alone (NH)	x	x	34	34	72	x	x	0.03%	0.03%	0.06%
Other race alone (NH)	1,401	225	386	296	807	1.30%	0.21%	0.34%	0.26%	0.65%
Mixed race or Multiracial (NH)	x	x	3,090	3,605	6,876	x	x	2.71%	3.16%	5.55%
Hispanic or Latino (any race)	2,251	2,827	3,814	4,666	6,793	2.08%	2.58%	3.34%	4.10%	5.48%
Total	107,966	109,592	114,024	113,934	123,851	100.00%	100.00%	100.00%	100.00%	100.00%

=== Crime ===
According to the Uniform Crime Reporting (UCR) program in 2022, Ann Arbor had 371 reported violent crimes (which include homicide, rape, robbery, and aggravated assault) and 2069 reported property crimes (which include arson, burglary, larceny-theft, and motor vehicle theft). With a violent crime rate of 309.5 per 100,000 people, the city's violent crime rate is lower than Michigan's rate of 461 per 100,000 people and the U.S. national rate of 380.7 per 100,000 people. However, Ann Arbor's property crime rate, at 1726.0 per 100,000 people, is higher than Michigan's property crime rate of 1536.8 per 100,000 people and lower than the U.S. national property crime rate of 1954.4 per 100,000 people. (Note: The crime rate per 100,000 is based on the 2022 population of 119,871 in relation to the number of reported crimes in 2022.)

== Economy ==
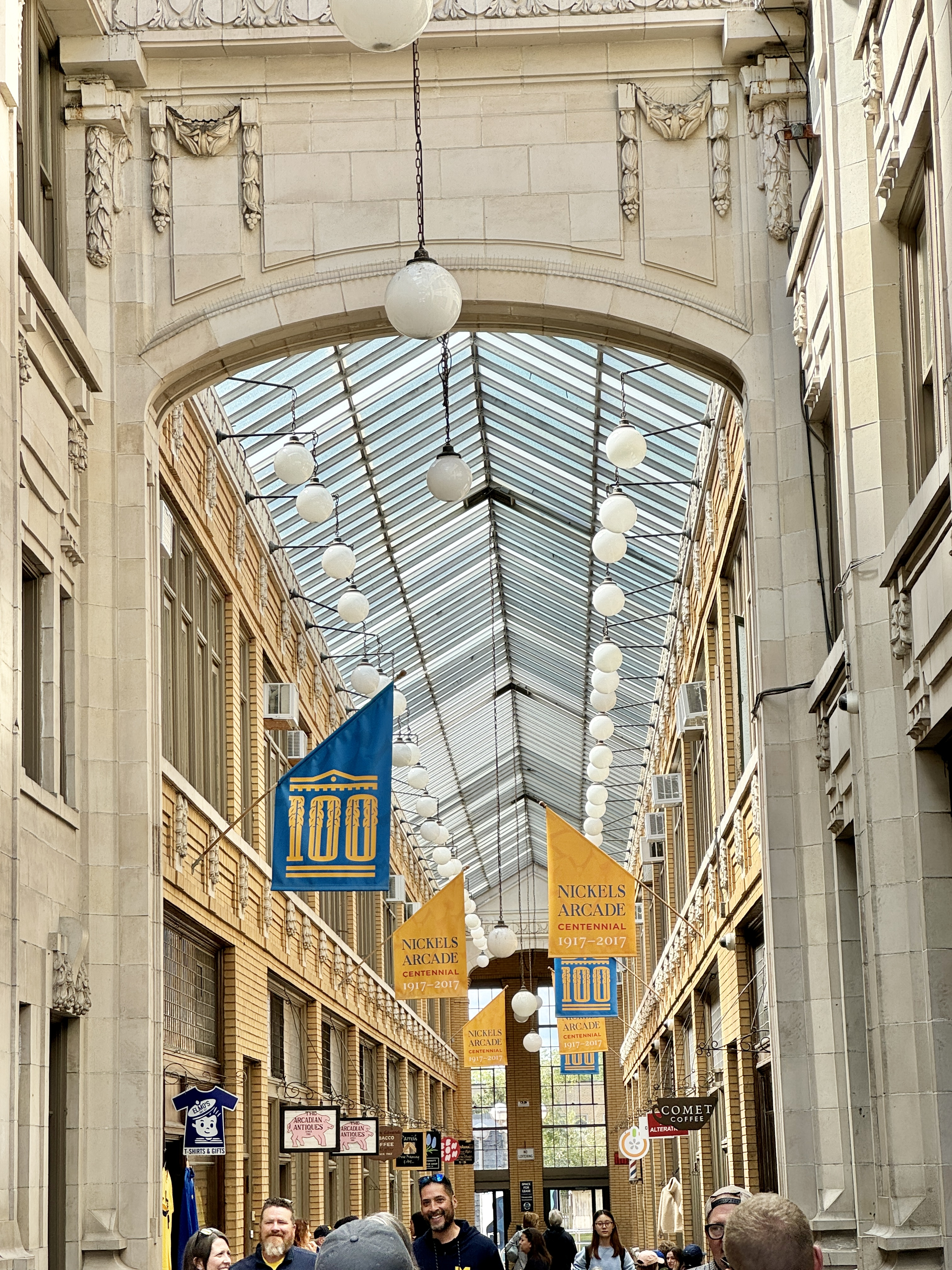
Nickels Arcade interior

The University of Michigan shapes Ann Arbor's economy significantly. It employs about 30,000 workers which includes about 12,000 in the medical center. Other employers are drawn to the area by the university's research and development money, and by its graduates. High tech, health services and biotechnology are other major components of the city's economy; numerous medical offices, laboratories, and associated companies are located in the city. Automobile manufacturers, such as General Motors and Visteon, also employ residents.

Its economy is primarily focused on high technology, with numerous startup companies drawn to the area due to the university's robust research and development activities. High tech companies have located in the area since the 1930s, when International Radio Corporation introduced the first mass-produced AC/DC radio (the Kadette, in 1931) as well as the first pocket radio (the Kadette Jr., in 1933). Firms include Arbor Networks (provider of Internet traffic engineering and security systems), Arbortext (provider of XML-based publishing software), JSTOR (the digital scholarly journal archive), Truven Health Analytics, and ProQuest, which includes UMI. Duo Security, a cloud-based access security provider of two-factor authentication, is headquartered in Ann Arbor. It was formerly a unicorn and continues to be headquartered in Ann Arbor after its acquisition by Cisco Systems. In November 2021, semiconductor test equipment company KLA Corporation opened a new North American headquarters in Ann Arbor.

Ann Arbor is the home to Internet2 and the Merit Network, a not-for-profit research and education computer network. Both are located in the South State Commons 2 building on South State Street. The city is also home to a secondary office of Google's AdWords program—the company's primary revenue stream. As of 2022, Ann Arbor is home to more than twenty video game and XR studios of varying sizes. The city plays host to a regional chapter of the International Game Developers Association (IGDA) which hosts monthly meetups, presentations, and educational events.

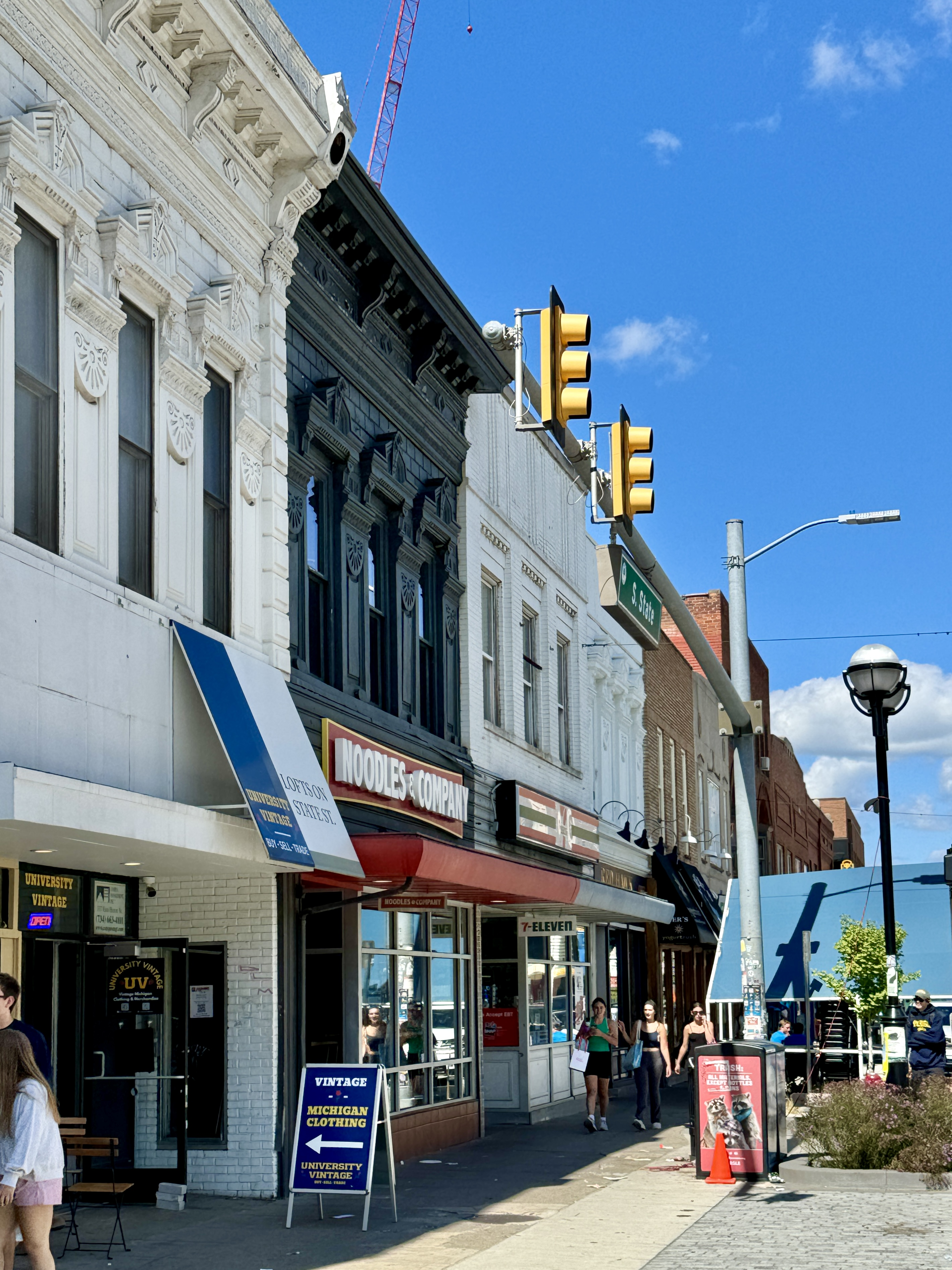
Commercial buildings in Downtown Ann Arbor

The city is the home of many research and engineering centers, including the Great Lakes Environmental Research Laboratory that is operated by NOAA and the Michigan Tech Research Institute. Other research centers sited in the city are the United States Environmental Protection Agency's National Vehicle and Fuel Emissions Laboratory and the Toyota Technical Center. The city is also home to National Sanitation Foundation International (NSF International), the nonprofit non-governmental organization that develops generally accepted standards for a variety of public health related industries and subject areas.

Non-high tech companies in Ann Arbor include Domino's Pizza, headquartered on Domino's Farms, a 271-acre (110 ha) Frank Lloyd Wright-inspired complex just northeast of the city. Another Ann Arbor-based company is Zingerman's Delicatessen, which serves sandwiches and has developed businesses under a variety of brand names. Avfuel, a global supplier of aviation fuels and services, is headquartered in Ann Arbor as is Pinkerton, a detective and private security firm. Many cooperative enterprises were founded in the city; among those that remain are the People's Food Co-op and the Inter-Cooperative Council at the University of Michigan, a student housing cooperative founded in 1937. There are also three cohousing communities—Sunward, Great Oak, and Touchstone—located immediately to the west of the city limits.

== Culture ==
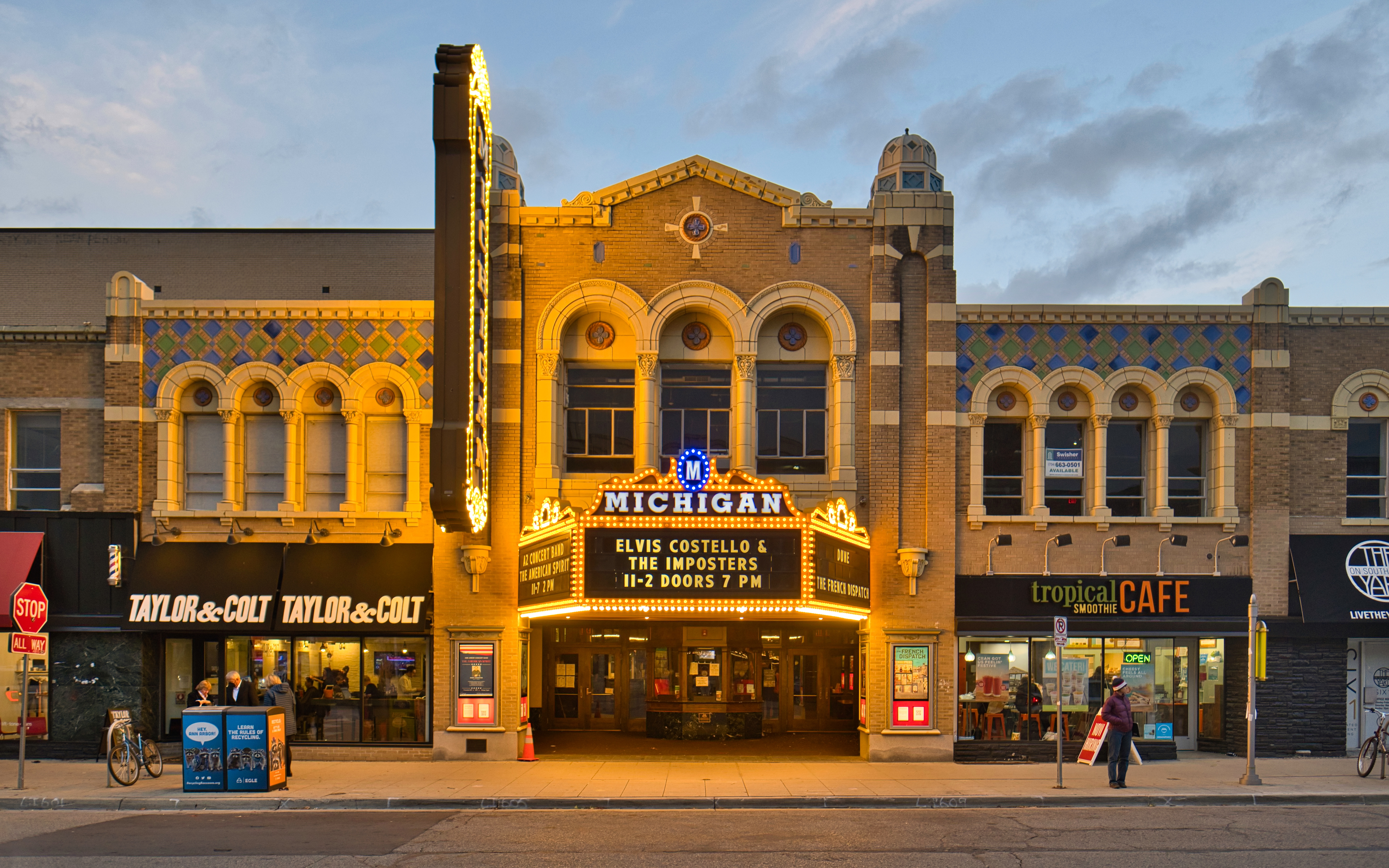
Michigan Theater is the location of the Ann Arbor Film Festival, the Ann Arbor Symphony, and the Ann Arbor Concert Band

Several performing arts groups and facilities are on the University of Michigan's campus, as are museums dedicated to art, archaeology, and natural history and sciences. Founded in 1879, the University Musical Society is an independent performing arts organization that presents over 60 events each year, bringing international artists in music, dance, and theater. Since 2001 Shakespeare in the Arb has presented one play by Shakespeare each June, in a large park near downtown. Regional and local performing arts groups not associated with the university include the Ann Arbor Civic Theatre, the Arbor Opera Theater, the Ann Arbor Symphony Orchestra, The Ark, and Performance Network Theatre. State Theatre and the adjacent Michigan Theater are a movie palace and a performing arts center, respectively. Another unique piece of artistic expression in Ann Arbor is the fairy doors. These small portals are examples of installation art and can be found throughout the downtown area.

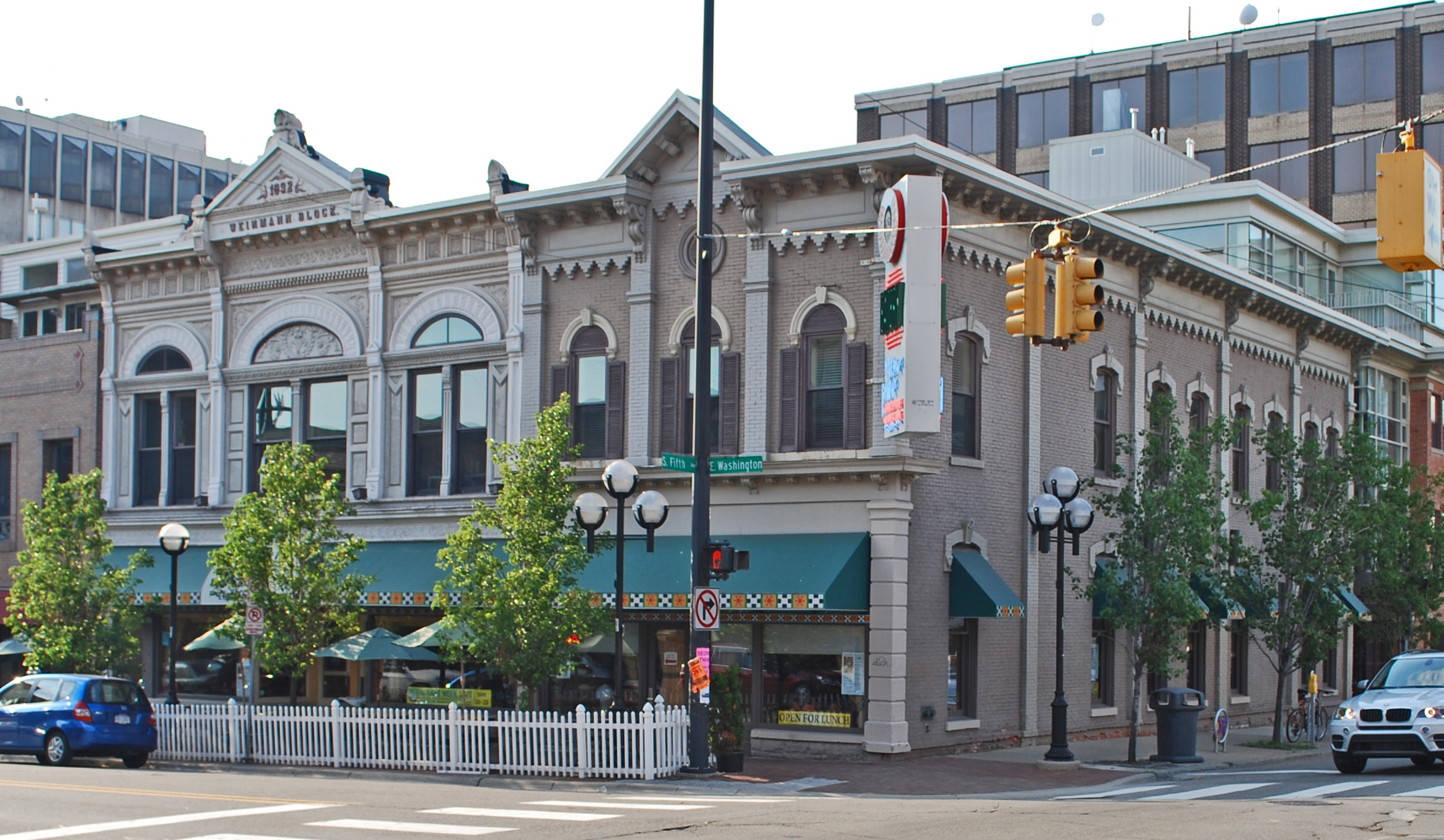
The Weinmann Block is listed on the NRHP

The Ann Arbor Hands-On Museum, an interactive science center, is located in a renovated and expanded historic downtown fire station. The Ann Arbor Art Center is a nonprofit that organizes art activities and exhibitions. Aside from the Ann Arbor District Library, which maintains four branch outlets in addition to its main downtown building, and being the home to the Gerald R. Ford Presidential Library, Ann Arbor ranks first among U.S. cities in the number of booksellers and books sold per capita.

Several annual events—many of them centered on performing and visual arts—draw visitors to Ann Arbor. One such event is the Ann Arbor Art Fairs, a set of four concurrent juried fairs held on downtown streets. Scheduled on Thursday through Sunday of the third week of July, the fairs draw upward of half a million visitors. Another is the Ann Arbor Film Festival, held during the third week of March, which receives more than 2,500 submissions annually from more than 40 countries and serves as one of a handful of Academy Award–qualifying festivals in the United States.

Ann Arbor has a long history of openness to marijuana, given Ann Arbor's decriminalization of cannabis, the large number of medical marijuana dispensaries in the city (one dispensary, called People's Co-op, was directly across the street from Michigan Stadium until zoning forced it to move one mile to the west), the large number of pro-marijuana residents, and the annual Hash Bash: an event that is held on the first Saturday of April. Until (at least) the successful passage of Michigan's medical marijuana law, the event had arguably strayed from its initial intent, although for years, a number of attendees have received serious legal responses due to marijuana use on University of Michigan property, which does not fall under the city's progressive and compassionate ticketing program.

A person from Ann Arbor is called an "Ann Arborite", and many long-time residents call themselves "townies". The city itself is often called "A²" ("A-squared") or "A2" ("A two") or "AA", "The Deuce" (mainly by Chicagoans), and "Tree Town". With tongue-in-cheek reference to the city's liberal political leanings, some occasionally refer to Ann Arbor as "The People's Republic of Ann Arbor" or "25 square miles surrounded by reality." In A Prairie Home Companion broadcast from Ann Arbor, Garrison Keillor described Ann Arbor as "a city where people discuss socialism, but only in the fanciest restaurants." Ann Arbor sometimes appears on citation indexes as an author, instead of a location, often with the academic degree MI, a misunderstanding of the abbreviation for Michigan.

== Sports ==
Ann Arbor is a major center for college sports, most notably at the University of Michigan. Several well-known college sports facilities exist in the city, including Michigan Stadium, the largest American football stadium and the third-largest stadium of any kind in the world with a capacity of 107,601. The stadium is colloquially known as "The Big House" due to its status as the largest American football stadium. Crisler Center and Yost Ice Arena play host to the school's basketball (both men's and women's) and ice hockey teams, respectively. Concordia University, a member of the NAIA, also fields sports teams.

In semi-professional sports Ann Arbor is represented in the NPSL by AFC Ann Arbor, a soccer club founded in 2014 who call themselves The Mighty Oak.

== Government ==
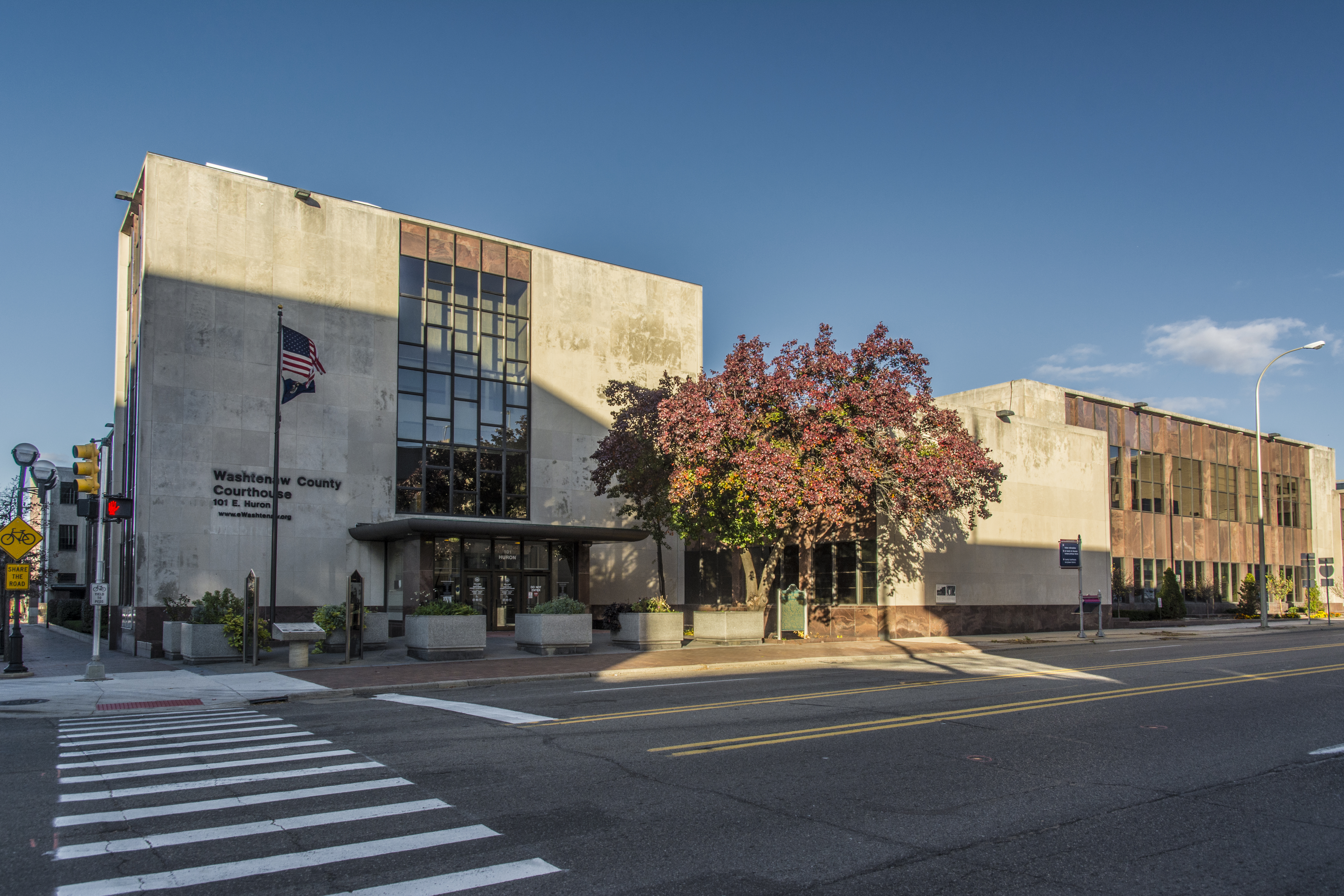
Washtenaw County Courthouse

As the county seat of Washtenaw County, the Washtenaw County Trial Court (22nd Judicial Circuit Court) is located in Ann Arbor at the Washtenaw County Courthouse on Main Street. Seven judges serve on the court. The 15th Michigan district court, which serves only the city itself, is located within the Ann Arbor Justice Center, immediately next to city hall. The U.S. District Court for the Eastern District of Michigan and Court of Appeals for the Sixth Circuit are also located in downtown Ann Arbor, at the federal building on Liberty Street.

In the Michigan Legislature, the city is split between Districts 23, 33, 47, and 48 in the Michigan House of Representatives. In the Michigan Senate, Ann Arbor is covered by Districts 14 and 15. Ann Arbor is within the 6th congressional district, currently represented by Debbie Dingell.

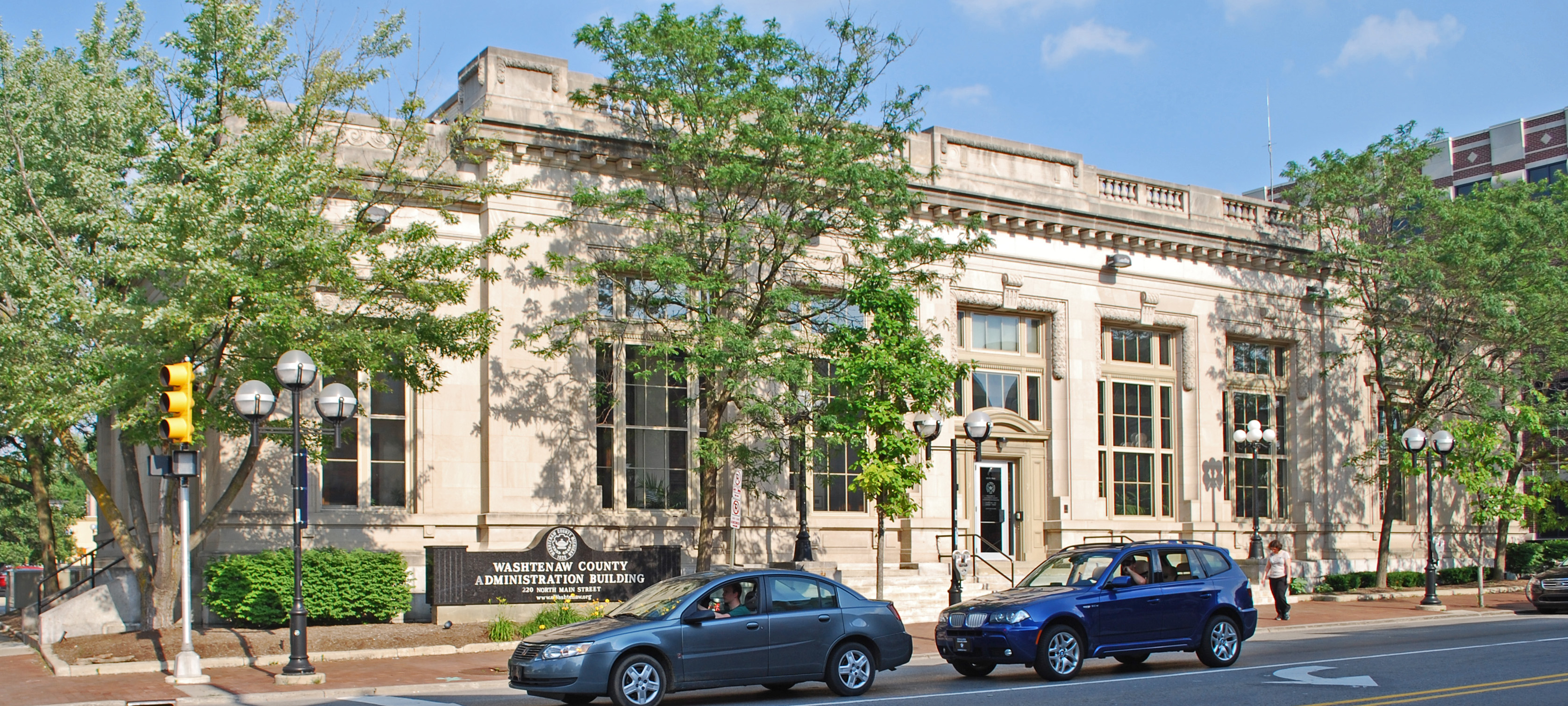
Washtenaw County Administration Building

Ann Arbor has a council–manager form of government, with 11 voting members: the mayor and 10 city council members. Each of the city's five wards are represented by two council members, with the mayor elected at-large during midterm years. Half of the council members are elected in midterm years, with the other in general election years. The mayor is the presiding officer of the city council and has the power to appoint all council committee members as well as board and commission members, with the approval of the city council. The current mayor of Ann Arbor is Christopher Taylor, a Democrat who was elected as mayor in 2014. Day-to-day city operations are managed by a city administrator chosen by the city council. While Democrats, as of 2024, hold the mayorship and all ten council seats, Ann Arbor has two major political factions. A major source of this local divide is differences in views on the city's growth.

Current Ann Arbor City Council members
Ward	Council member	Party	Term
1	Lisa Disch	Democrat	2024–2028
1	Cynthia Harrison	Democrat	2022–2026
2	Jon Mallek	Democrat	2024–2028
2	Chris Watson	Democrat	2022–2026
3	Travis Radina	Democrat	2024–2028
3	Ayesha Ghazi Edwin	Democrat	2022–2026
4	Jen Eyer	Democrat	2024–2028
4	Dharma Akmon	Democrat	2022–2026
5	Erica Briggs	Democrat	2024–2028
5	Jenn Cornell	Democrat	2022–2026

== Education ==
=== Primary and secondary education ===
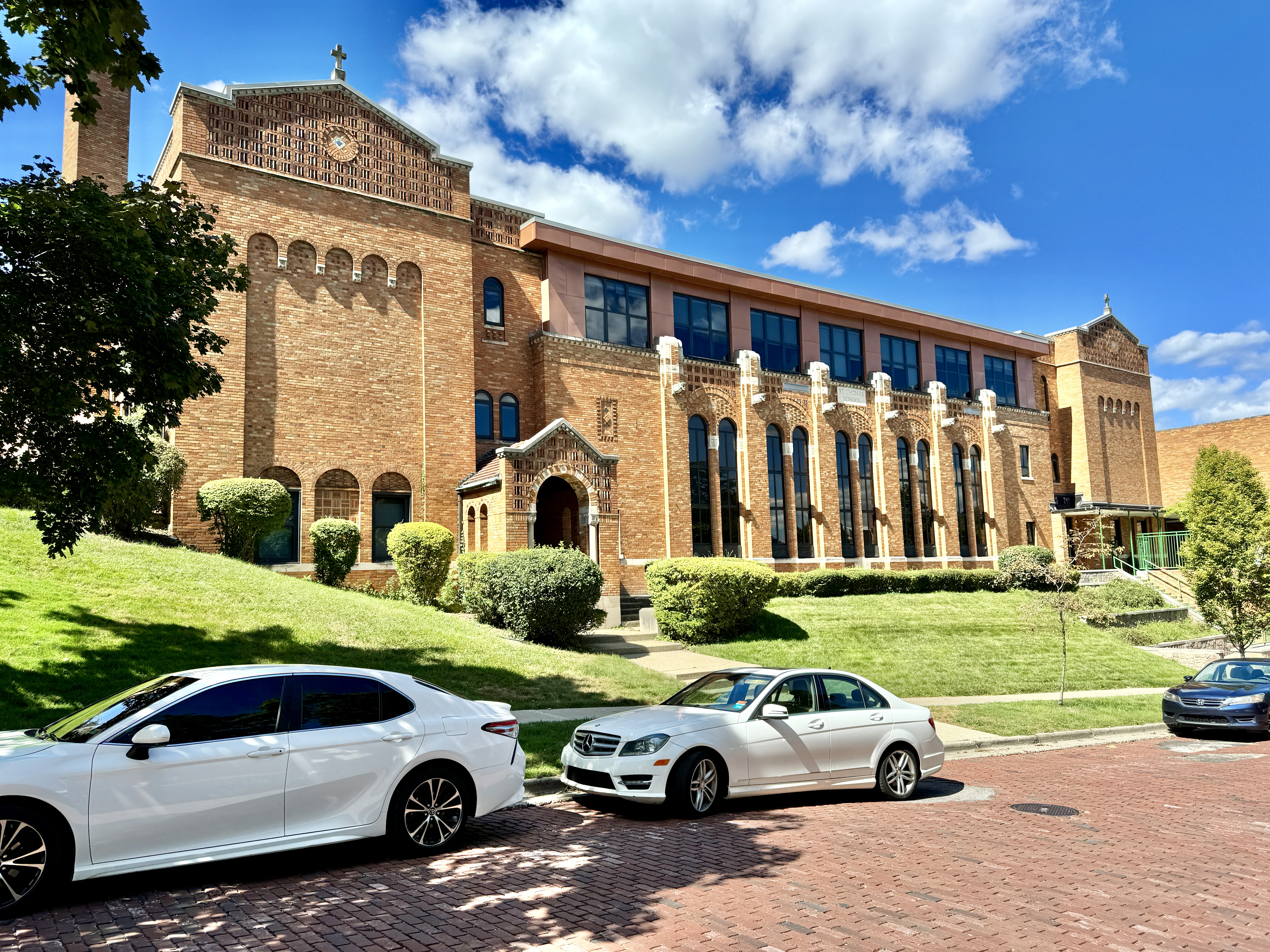
St. Thomas the Apostle Catholic School

Public schools are part of the Ann Arbor Public Schools (AAPS) district. AAPS has one of the country's leading music programs. For the 2021–2022 school year, 17,070 students were enrolled in the Ann Arbor Public Schools. Notable schools include Pioneer, Huron, Skyline, Community high schools, Pathways to Success Academic Campus, and Ann Arbor Open School. The district has a preschool center with both free and tuition-based programs for preschoolers in the district. The University High School, a "demonstration school" with teachers drawn from the University of Michigan's education program, was part of the school system from 1924 to 1968.

Ann Arbor is home to several private schools, including Clonlara School, Michigan Islamic Academy, and Greenhills School, a prep school. The city is also home to several charter schools such as Central Academy (Michigan) (PreK–12) of the Global Educational Excellence (GEE) charter school company.

=== Higher education ===
The University of Michigan dominates the city of Ann Arbor, providing the city with its college town character. University buildings are located in the center of the city and the campus is directly adjacent to the State Street and South University downtown areas.

Other local colleges and universities include Concordia University Ann Arbor, a Lutheran liberal-arts institution. In 2000, the Ave Maria School of Law, a Roman Catholic law school established by Domino's Pizza founder Tom Monaghan, opened in northeastern Ann Arbor; the school moved to Ave Maria, Florida in 2009, and the Thomas M. Cooley Law School acquired the former Ave Maria buildings for use as a branch campus.

== Media ==
The Ann Arbor News, owned by the Michigan-based Booth Newspapers chain, was the major newspaper serving Ann Arbor and the rest of Washtenaw County. The newspaper ended its 174-year daily print run in 2009 due to economic difficulties, and began producing two printed editions a week under the name AnnArbor.com. Ann Arbor has been said to be the first significant city to lose its only daily paper. The publication resumed using its former name in 2013, and also produces a daily digital edition named MLive.com. Another Ann Arbor-based publication that has ceased production was the Ann Arbor Paper, a free monthly. The Ann Arbor Chronicle, an online newspaper, covered local news, including meetings of the library board, county commission, and DDA until September 3, 2014.

Publications in the city include the Ann Arbor Observer, a free monthly local magazine; and Current, a free entertainment-focused alt-weekly. The Ann Arbor Business Review covers local business in the area. Car and Driver magazine and Automobile Magazine are also based in Ann Arbor. The University of Michigan is served by many student publications, including the independent Michigan Daily student newspaper, which reports on local, state, and regional issues in addition to campus news.

Four major AM radio stations based in or near Ann Arbor are WAAM 1600, a conservative news and talk station; WLBY 1290, a business news and talk station; WDEO 990, Catholic radio; and WTKA 1050, which is primarily a sports station. The city's FM stations include NPR affiliate WUOM 91.7; country station WWWW 102.9; and adult-alternative station WQKL 107.1. Freeform station WCBN-FM 88.3 is a local community radio/college radio station operated by the students of the University of Michigan featuring noncommercial, eclectic music and public-affairs programming. The city is also served by public and commercial radio broadcasters in Ypsilanti, the Lansing/Jackson area, Detroit, Windsor, and Toledo.

Ann Arbor is part of the Detroit television market. WPXD channel 31, the owned-and-operated Detroit outlet of the ION Television network, is licensed to the city. Until its sign-off on August 31, 2017, WHTV channel 18, a MyNetworkTV-affiliated station for the Lansing market, was broadcast from a transmitter in Lyndon Township, west of Ann Arbor. Community Television Network (CTN) is a city-provided cable television channel with production facilities open to city residents and nonprofit organizations. Detroit and Toledo-area radio and television stations also serve Ann Arbor, and stations from Lansing and Windsor, Ontario, can be seen in parts of the area.

== Infrastructure ==
=== Healthcare ===
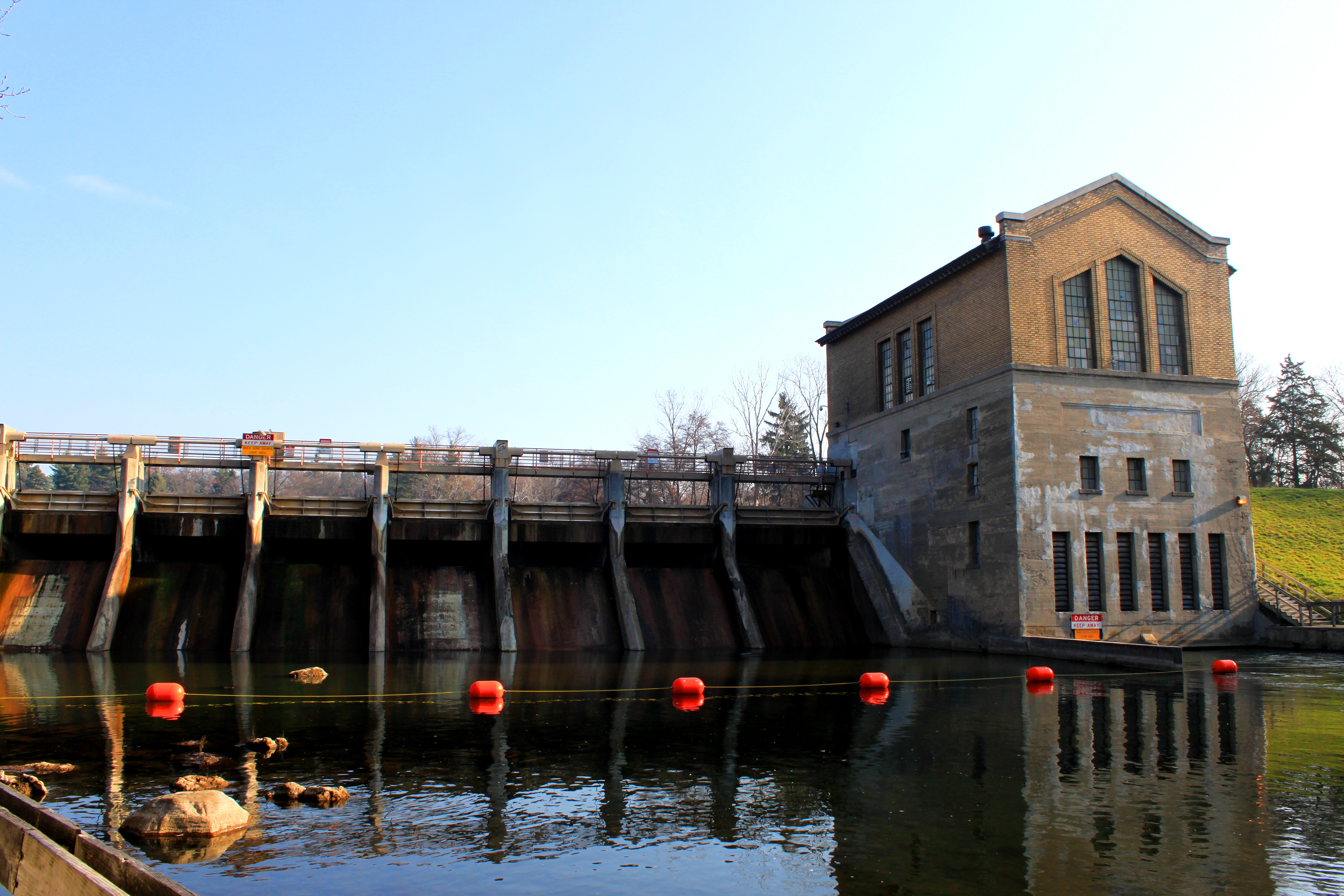
Barton Dam

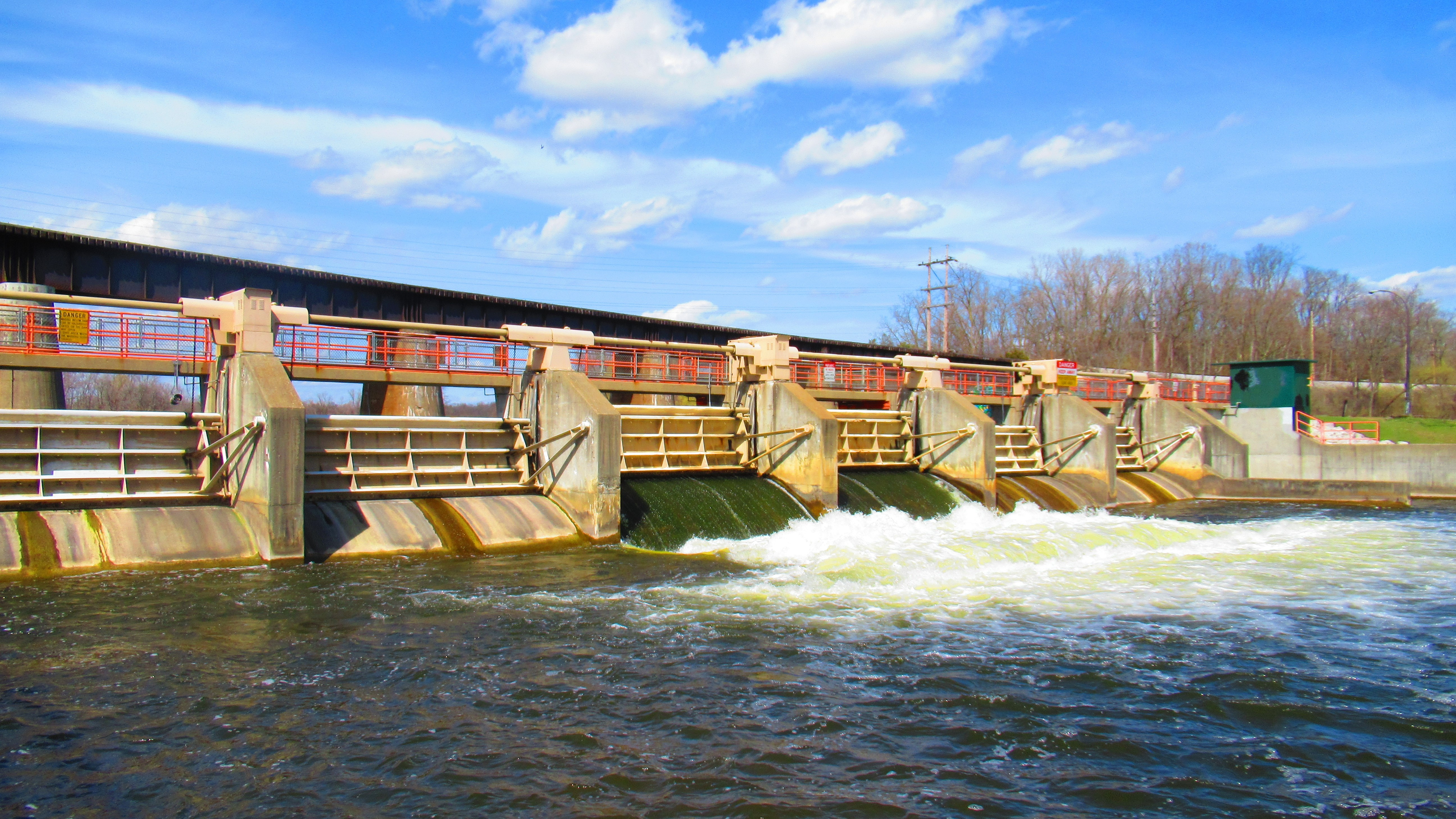
Argo Dam

The University of Michigan Health System (UMHS) includes University Hospital, C.S. Mott Children's Hospital and Women's Hospital in its core complex. UMHS also operates out-patient clinics and facilities throughout the city. The area's other major medical centers include a large facility operated by the Department of Veterans Affairs in Ann Arbor, and Saint Joseph Mercy Hospital in nearby Superior Township.

=== Utilities ===
The city provides sewage disposal and water supply services, with water coming from the Huron River and groundwater sources. There are two water-treatment plants, one main and three outlying reservoirs, four pump stations, and two water towers. These facilities serve the city, which is divided into five water districts. The city's water department also operates four dams along the Huron River—Argo, Barton, Geddes, and Superior—of which Barton and Superior provide hydroelectric power.

The city also offers waste management services, with Recycle Ann Arbor handling recycling service. Other utilities are provided by private entities. Electrical power and gas are provided by DTE Energy. AT&T Inc. is the primary wired telephone service provider for the area. Cable TV service is primarily provided by Comcast.

A plume of the industrial solvent dioxane is migrating under the city from the contaminated Gelman Sciences, Inc. property on the westside of Ann Arbor. As of 2021, the average measured concentration was found to be 201.19 ppb, with the maximum being 6.000 ppm. (Note: The average and maximum were taken for the year 2021, as found in the dataset provided by Scio Residents for Clean Water.) While the United States Environmental Protection Agency does not impose a federal limit on the level of the contaminant allowed in drinking water, the World Health Organization suggests a limit of 35 ppb. The Gelman plume is a potential threat to one of the City of Ann Arbor's drinking water sources, the Huron River, which flows through downtown Ann Arbor.

=== Transportation ===
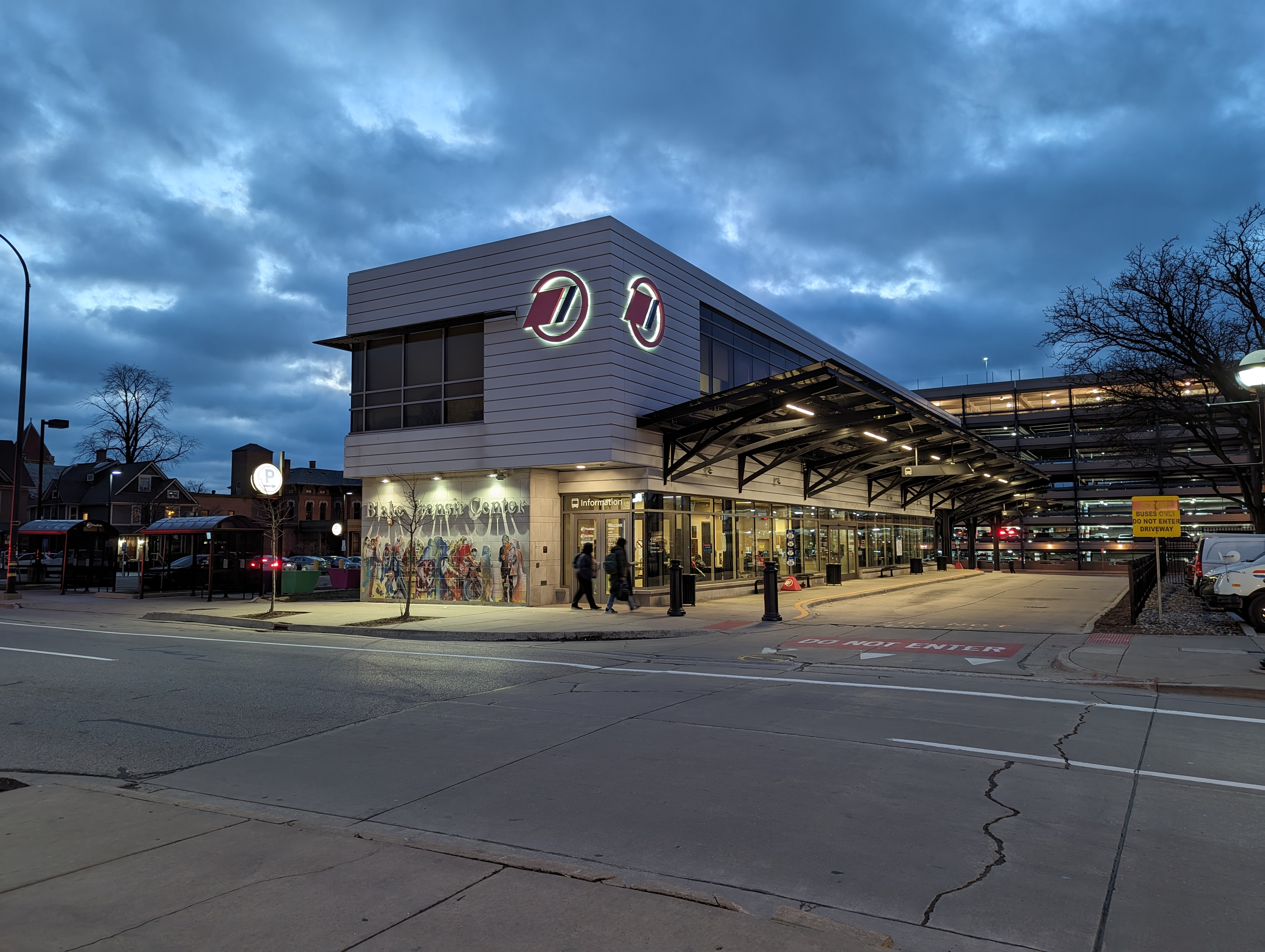
Blake Transit Center

The streets in downtown Ann Arbor conform to a grid pattern, though this pattern is less common in the surrounding areas. Major roads branch out from the downtown district to the highways surrounding the city. The city is belted by three freeways: Interstate 94 (I-94), which runs along the southern and western portion of the city; U.S. Highway 23 (US 23), which primarily runs along the eastern edge of Ann Arbor; and M-14, which runs along the northern edge of the city. Other nearby highways include US 12 (Michigan Avenue), M-17 (Washtenaw Avenue), and M-153 (Ford Road). Several of the major surface arteries lead to the I-94/M-14 interchange in the west, US 23 in the east, and the city's southern areas. The Washtenaw County Border-to-Border Trail connects Ann Arbor to Ypsilanti, mostly along the Huron River, for pedestrians, bicycles and other non-motorized transportation.

The Ann Arbor Area Transportation Authority (AAATA), which brands itself as "TheRide", operates public bus services throughout the city and nearby Ypsilanti. The AAATA operates the Blake Transit Center on Fourth Ave. in downtown Ann Arbor, and the Ypsilanti Transit Center. A separate zero-fare bus service operates within and between the University of Michigan campuses. In 2019, 36% of trips in Ann Arbor were taken by walking, biking or transit.

Since April 2012, the "AirRide" connects to Detroit Metro Airport a dozen times a day. The Michigan Flyer, a service operated by Indian Trails, cooperates with AAATA for their AirRide and additionally offers bus service to East Lansing. Greyhound Lines provides intercity bus service. Megabus has direct service to Chicago, Illinois, while a bus service is provided by Amtrak Thruway for rail passengers making connections to services in East Lansing and Toledo, Ohio.

Amtrak, which provides service to the city at the Ann Arbor Train Station, operates the Wolverine train between Chicago and Pontiac via Detroit. The present-day train station neighbors the city's old Michigan Central Depot, which was renovated as a restaurant in 1970. The Ann Arbor Railroad passes through the city and provides freight service but no passenger service.

Ann Arbor Municipal Airport is a small, city-run general aviation airport located just south of the city.

== Sister cities ==
Ann Arbor has eight sister cities:

- Tübingen, Baden-Württemberg, Germany (since 1965) The schools in Ann Arbor and Tübingen have regular exchanges.
- Belize City, Belize (since 1967)
- Hikone, Shiga, Japan (since 1969) The schools in Ann Arbor and Hikone have regular exchanges.
- Peterborough, Ontario, Canada (since 1983)
- Juigalpa, Chontales, Nicaragua (since 1986)
- Dakar, Senegal (since 1997)
- Remedios, Cuba (since 2003)
- Lubny, Ukraine (since 2024)

== See also ==
- Ann Arbor staging
- Ardis Publishing
- List of people from Ann Arbor
