= Beth Israel Congregation (Ann Arbor, Michigan) =

Beth Israel
- Hebrew: בית ישראל
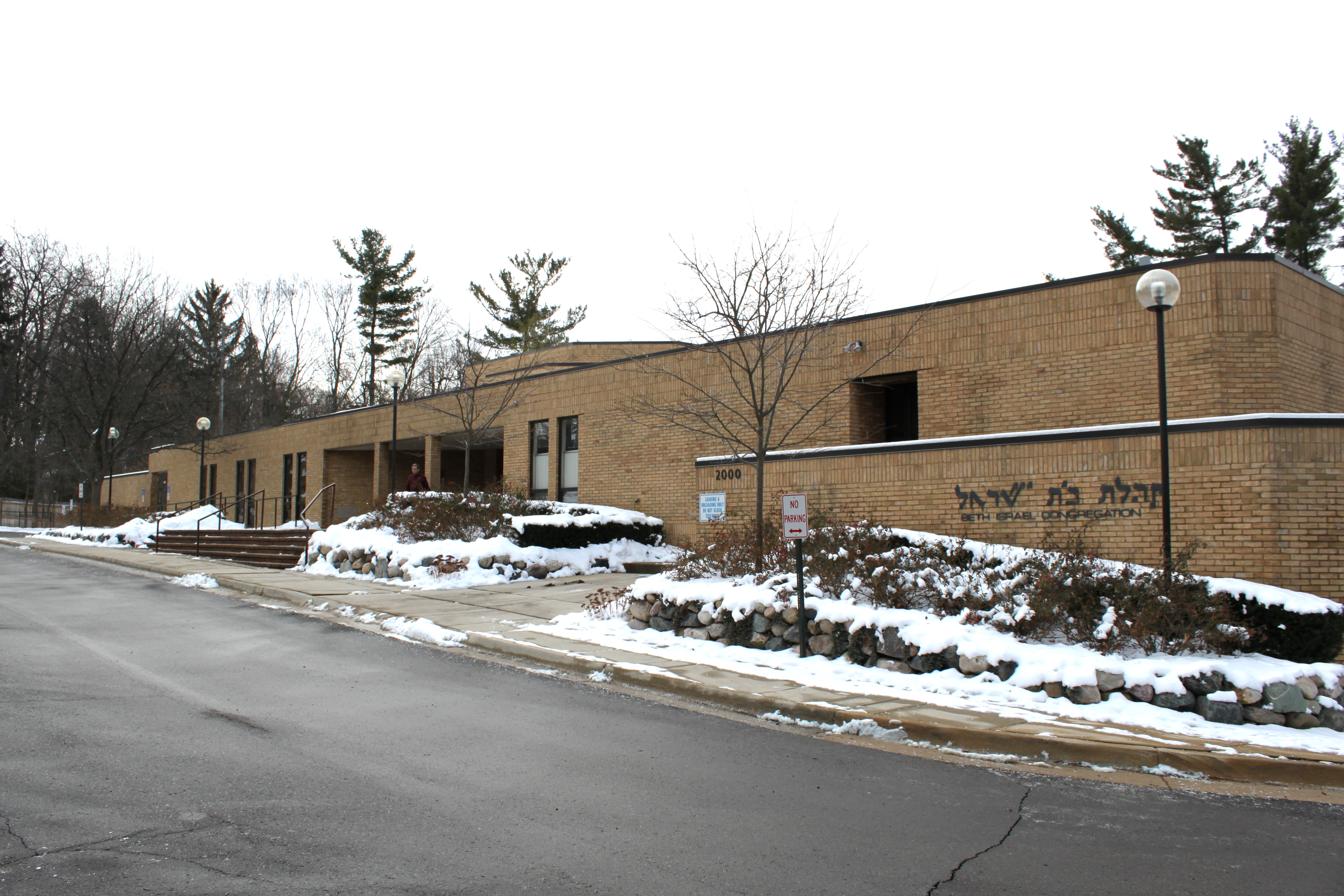
- Beth Israel synagogue

- Location in Michigan

Religion
- Affiliation: Conservative Judaism
- Ecclesiastical or organizational status: Synagogue
- Leadership: Rabbi Nadav Caine
- Status: Active

Location
- Location: 2000 Washtenaw Avenue, Ann Arbor, Michigan
- Country: United States
- Interactive map of Beth Israel
- Coordinates: 42°16′04″N 83°43′20″W

Architecture
- Established: 1916 (as a congregation)

Website
- bethisrael-aa.org

Beth Israel Congregation (Hebrew: בית ישראל) is a Conservative synagogue located at 2000 Washtenaw Avenue in Ann Arbor, Michigan, in the United States. Established in 1916, Beth Israel is the oldest synagogue in Ann Arbor.

In 2009, the egalitarian congregation had 480 member households, and the Rabbi, since 2018, is Nadav Caine.

== History ==
Beth Israel Congregation of Ann Arbor was the first conservative congregation established in Michigan, founded In 1916 by Osias Zwerdling, Philip Lansky, and other members of the Ann Arbor Jewish Community.

In 1997, Gerda Seligson received the Jewish Theological Seminary's Second Century award. A video recording of this event can be found in the Synagogue's records.

Beginning in 2003 demonstrators carrying anti-Zionist posters assembled weekly on the sidewalk near the synagogue at the time of Saturday morning services. Two members of the congregation filed a federal lawsuit against the demonstrators in 2019, asking for an injunction to stop the demonstrations and damages for emotional distress. This injunction was followed by a Amicus curiae brief from the Michigan branch of the American Civil Liberties Union that supported the congregation, while also defending the demonstrators' right to First Amendment speech. The injunction was dismissed in August 2020, re-filed, and affirmed in 2021 by the Sixth Circuit.

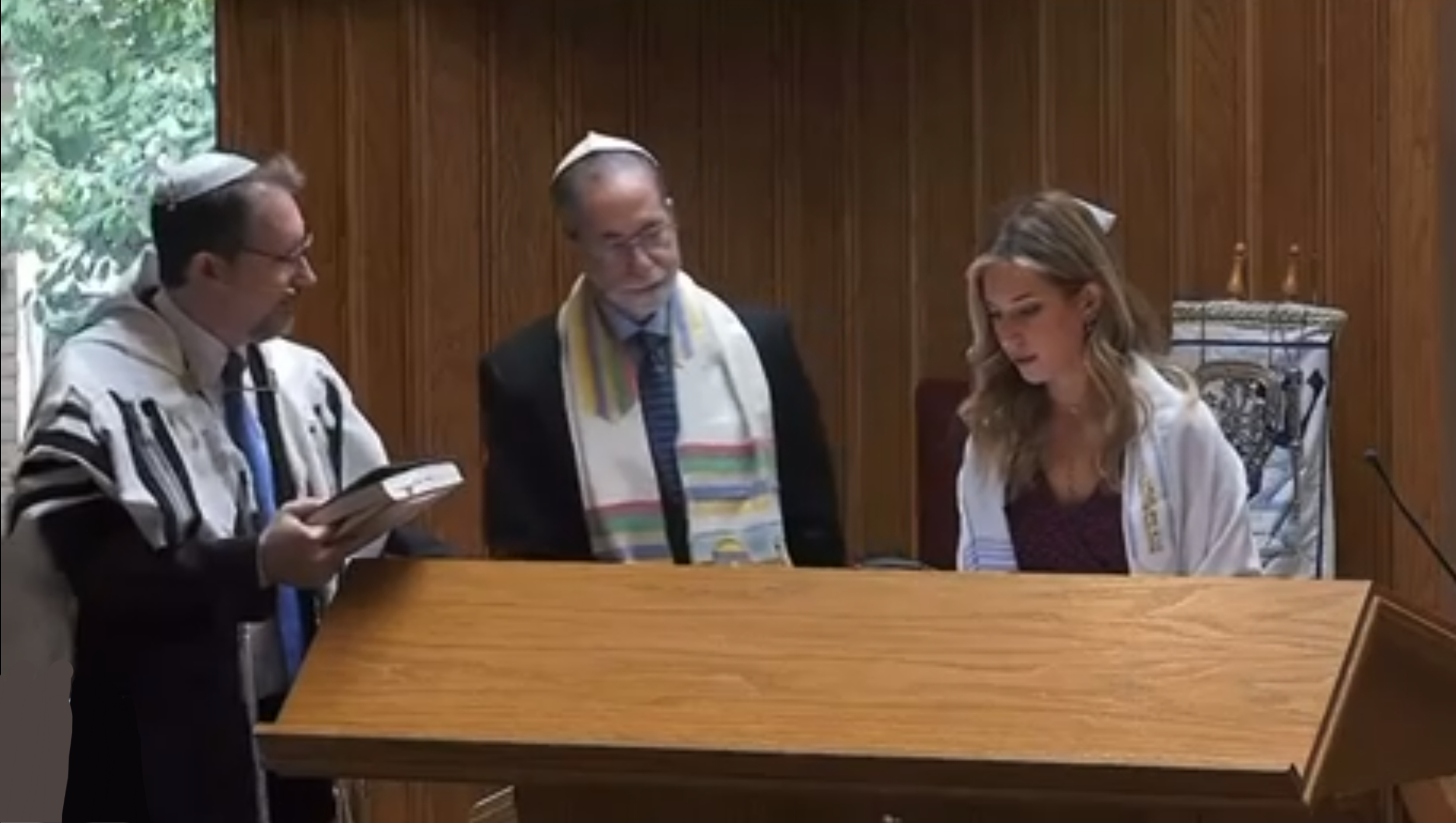
Rabbi Rav Nadav (left) leading an Aliyah, Yom Kippur 2022.
