= Weinmann Block =

- U.S. National Register of Historic Places
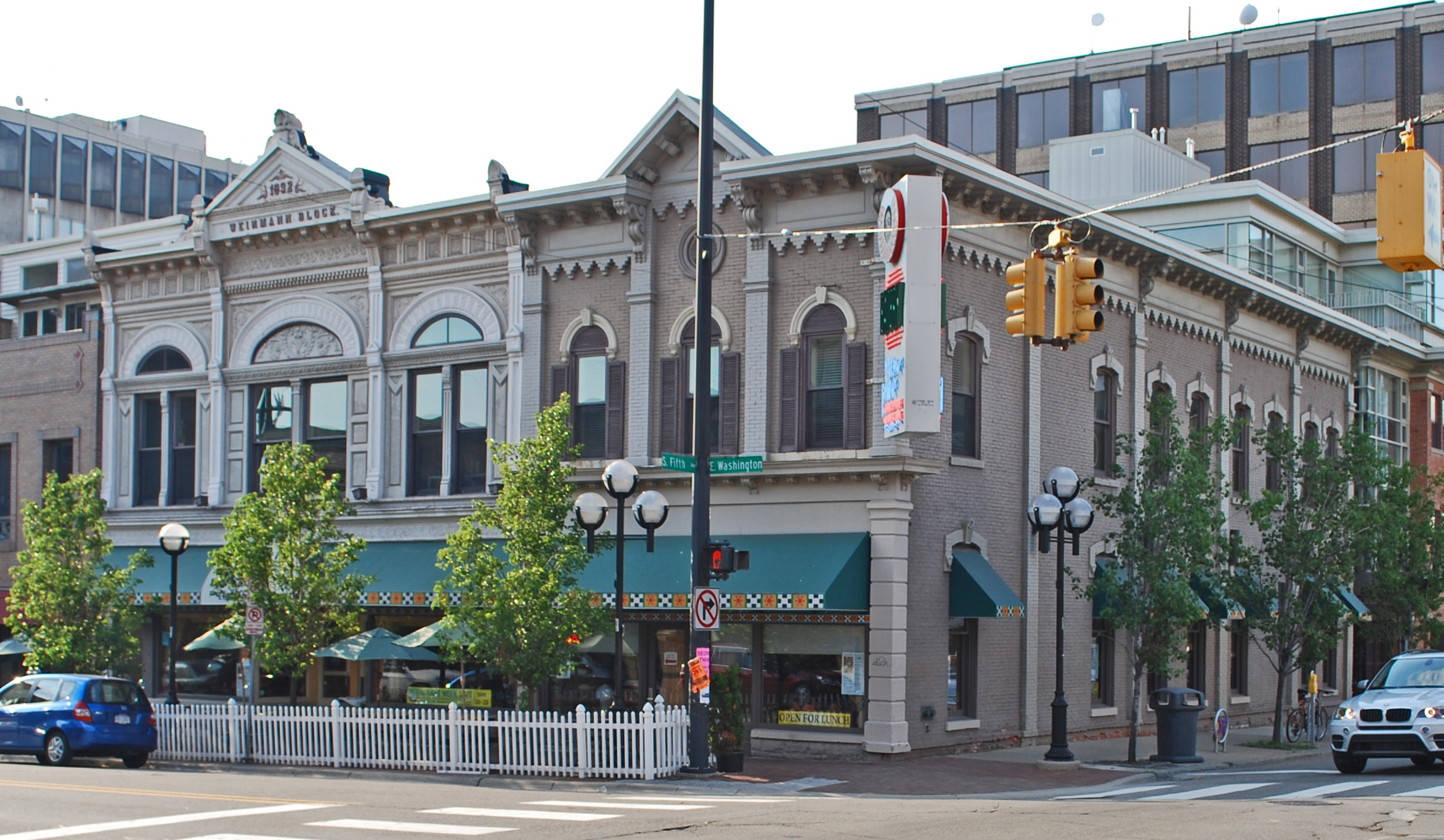
- Interactive map
- Location: 219-223 E. Washington St., Ann Arbor, Michigan
- Coordinates: 42°16′50″N 83°44′47″W
- Area: less than one acre
- Built: 1885
- Architectural style: Late Victorian, Italianate
- NRHP reference No.: 83000891
- Added to NRHP: September 8, 1983

The Weinmann Block is a commercial building located at 219–223 East Washington Street in Ann Arbor, Michigan. It was listed on the National Register of Historic Places in 1983.

== History ==
John M. Weinmann was born In Germany in 1836, and settled in Ann Arbor as a young man. In 1863 he married Dorothea Stein and set up a butcher shop. The shop proved prosperous, and in about 1885 Weinmann had the eastern half of this building, located on the corner, constructed. The butcher shop occupied the grade floor. In 1891 Weinmann's son, Louis C. Weinmann, and a nephew, George Stein entered into a partnership, took over the butcher shop, and had the western half of the building constructed. This building held the meat market until 1937. The corner building was purchased in 1894 by V. Schneider, and housed a confectionery shop, a saloon, and a plumbing shop over the years.

The Jno. c. Fischer Company purchased the entire Weinmann Block in 1937. Fisher had been in the hardware business since 1895. The business was sold several times, but remained in the Weinmann Block until 1982. A development corporation purchased the building and redeveloped it for commercial and office use.

== Description ==
The Weinmann Block consists of two, two-story, brick, Late Victorian commercial blocks located side-by-side. The two buildings have had a shared interior space for many years. The eastern section on the street corner is a three-bay wide, Italianate structure built in the mid-1880s. The western portion, built in 1892, is wider and has an elaborate galvanized iron facade.

The corner portion of the Weinmann Block is three bays wide along the front section and five bays wide along the side. Vertical brick piers separate the bays. A bracketed, wooden cornice runs across the top; this was installed in 1982 to duplicates the original cornice removed in the 1950s. The windows are square-head, double-hung, sash units set in rounded-arch openings in front and segmental-arch openings in the side. The original storefront contained a central double door flanked by large windows; this has been rebuilt with large glass windows.

The western portion of the Weinmann Block still contains its original configuration of openings and windows, although remodeled, with a recessed entrance in the center of the facade and a narrow entrance to the second-floor staircase at the west end. The upper part of the facade has original galvanized iron ornamentation designed to give the appearance of masonry. It has a wide central bay topped with a pediment containing the name of the building and date of construction. and narrower bays on each side.
