= Charles H. Manly =

American politician from Michigan (1843–1930)

Mayor of Ann Arbor
- In office 1890–1891
- Preceded by: Samuel Beakes
- Succeeded by: William Doty

Member of the Michigan House of Representatives from the Washtenaw County 1st district
- In office January 1, 1887 – 1888

Personal details
- Born: September 16, 1843 Livingston County, Michigan
- Died: 1930 (aged 86–87) Jackson, Michigan
- Party: Democratic; Democratic-Greenback Party Fusion (1887-1888)

Military service
- Branch/service: United States Army (Union Army)
- Battles/wars: American Civil War • Battle of Gettysburg

Charles H. Manly (September 16, 1843 – 1930) was a Michigan politician.

== Early life ==
Manly was born in Livingston County, Michigan on September 16, 1843.

== Military career ==
Manly fought in the American Civil War for the Union Army. Manly was injured twice and lost his left arm in the battle of Gettysburg on July 2, 1863.

== Political career ==
On November 2, 1886, Manly was elected to the Michigan House of Representatives where he represented the Washtenaw County 1st district from January 5, 1887, to 1888. Manly was backed by both the Democrats and the Greenback Party. Manly was not re-elected in 1914. Manly served as mayor of Ann Arbor from 1890 to 1891.

== Death ==
Manly was hit and killed by a train in Jackson, Michigan in 1930.
