= Ann Arbor Skatepark =

Skatepark in Ann Arbor, Michigan, U.S.

- Interactive map of Ann Arbor Skatepark
- Type: Skatepark
- Location: Ann Arbor, Michigan
- Coordinates: 42.28482359983895°N 83.7792895538928°W
- Area: 30,000 Sq. Ft.
- Opened: June 2014
- Terrain: Concrete

The Ann Arbor Skatepark, also known as the A2 Skatepark, is a 30,000-square-foot skatepark in Ann Arbor, Michigan which opened June 21, 2014. The Ann Arbor Skatepark is located within Veterans Memorial Park.

== History ==
The Ann Arbor Skatepark started as the Ann Arbor Skatepark initiative with a local community of skaters who wanted to see a skatepark. In 2007, Trevor Staples founded Friends of the Ann Arbor Skatepark which formally advocated for the skatepark in the Ann Arbor community. Staples recruited other skaters and neighbors to support the initiative.

In 2013, the Ann Arbor city council gave the final approval necessary for the creation of a skatepark in the northwest corner of Veterans Memorial Park, on the west side of the city. The vote on a $1,031,592 contract with Krull Construction was unanimously approved.

The Ann Arbor Skate Park opened in the summer in 2014. At the opening, professional skateboarders skated the park including Tony Hawk, Andy Macdonald, Alex Sorgente, and Tony Magnusson.

In 2022, the skatepark received a grant for additional outdoor lighting.

=== Programming ===
Since 2014, the Friends of the Ann Arbor Skatepark have run All Girls Skate, a program to help girls and women of all ages learn to skate. The program invites women and girls of all ages to skate together at the Ann Arbor Skatepark Sunday mornings on the 2nd and 4th Sundays of the month from June - October. The program offers beginners the instruction and equipment for free.
