= Ann Arbor Observer =

- Editor: John Hilton
- Circulation: 60,000; Delivered free to zip codes 48103, 48104, 48105, and 48108, and of the Ann Arbor Public Schools district.
- Founder: Don and Mary Hunt
- Founded: 1976
- Country: United States
- Based in: Ann Arbor, Michigan
- Language: US English
- Website: www.annarborobserver.com
- ISSN: 0192-5717

The Ann Arbor Observer is a monthly newsprint magazine delivered free to all permanent residents of the Ann Arbor, Michigan school district and postal service area. The magazine was launched in 1976.

== Overview ==
The Ann Arbor Observer Company also owns and operates the Community Observer, a quarterly magazine delivered free to all permanent residents of the Chelsea, Michigan, Dexter, Michigan, Manchester, Michigan, and Saline, Michigan postal service areas; the biennial Guest Guide, available arborlist.com (free classified ads), washtenawguide.com(a guide to living and working in the Community Observer area), and AnnArborObserver.com (a comprehensive online guide to Ann Arbor with daily, weekly, and monthly events listings). In September 2025, the magazine was acquired by the Ann Arbor District Library.
