= Ann Arbor Police Department (Michigan) =

City of Ann Arbor Police Department
- Abbreviation: AAPD

Agency overview
- Formed: May 3, 1847

Jurisdictional structure
- Operations jurisdiction: Ann Arbor, Michigan, United States

Website
- https://www.a2gov.org/police-department/

The Ann Arbor Police Department is the law enforcement unit located in the city of Ann Arbor, Michigan, United States. Founded in 1847, which occurred when H.K Stanley was titled the first marshal of Ann Arbor. The department includes 122 sworn officers, with the prediction of a high number of retirements in the next few years. Apart from sworn officers, the department paid tribute to Brooke Switney, Police Service Specialist, and Chani Dixon, Community Standards Supervisor, in honor of Women's History Month noting that these non-sworn roles are vital to the department and the community.
