= Washtenaw County Administration Building =

- Main Street Post Office
- U.S. National Register of Historic Places
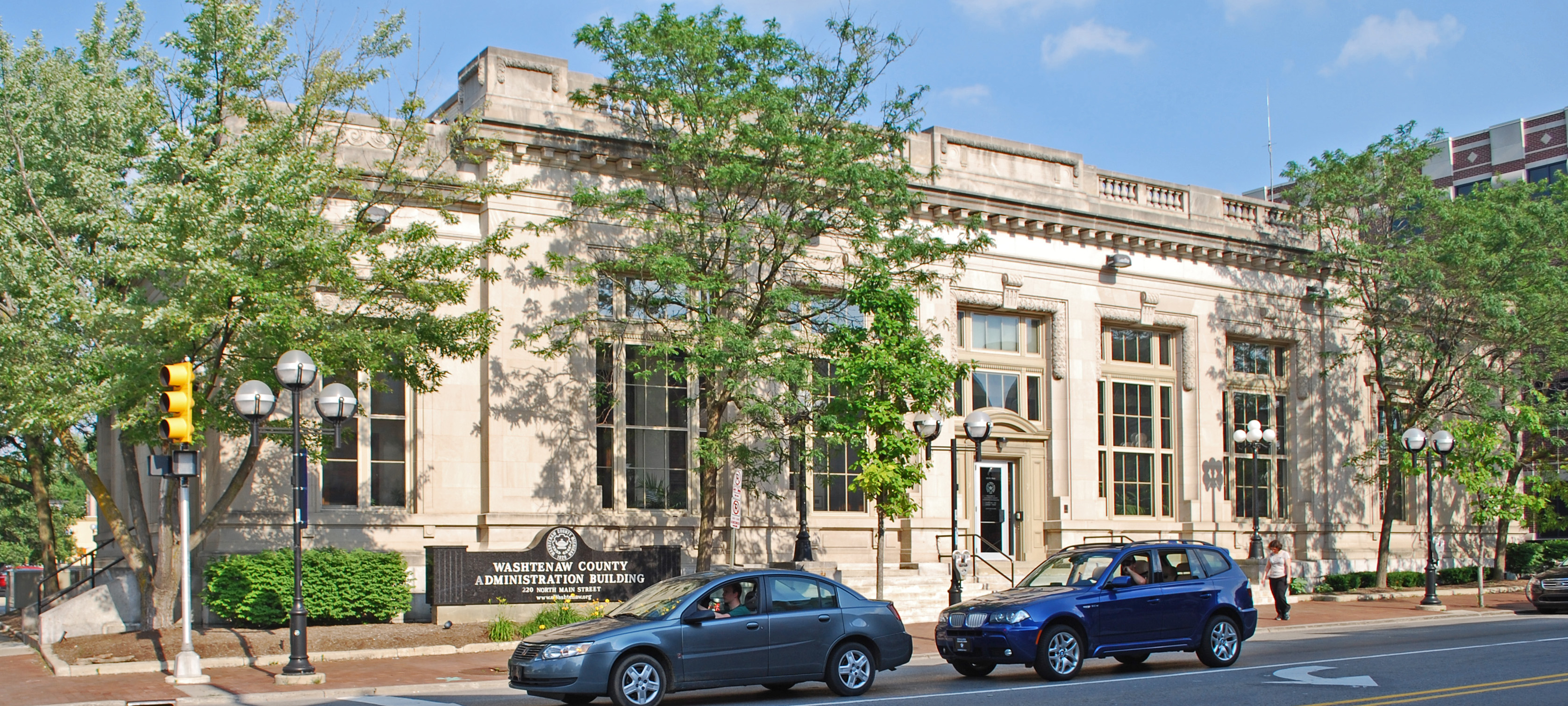
- Photographed in 2010

- Location within Michigan Location within the United States
- Interactive map
- Location: 220 N. Main St., Ann Arbor, Michigan
- Coordinates: 42°16′58″N 83°44′53″W
- Area: less than one acre
- Built: 1906
- Built by: C. Hoertz & Son; Rice Construction Co.
- Architect: Fremont Ward, US Treasury Department
- Architectural style: Neoclassical, Second Renaissance Revival
- NRHP reference No.: 78001512
- Added to NRHP: May 22, 1978

The Washtenaw County Administration Building is a former post office located at 220 North Main Street in Ann Arbor, Michigan. The building is now owned by Washtenaw County, Michigan. It was listed on the National Register of Historic Places in 1978.

== History ==
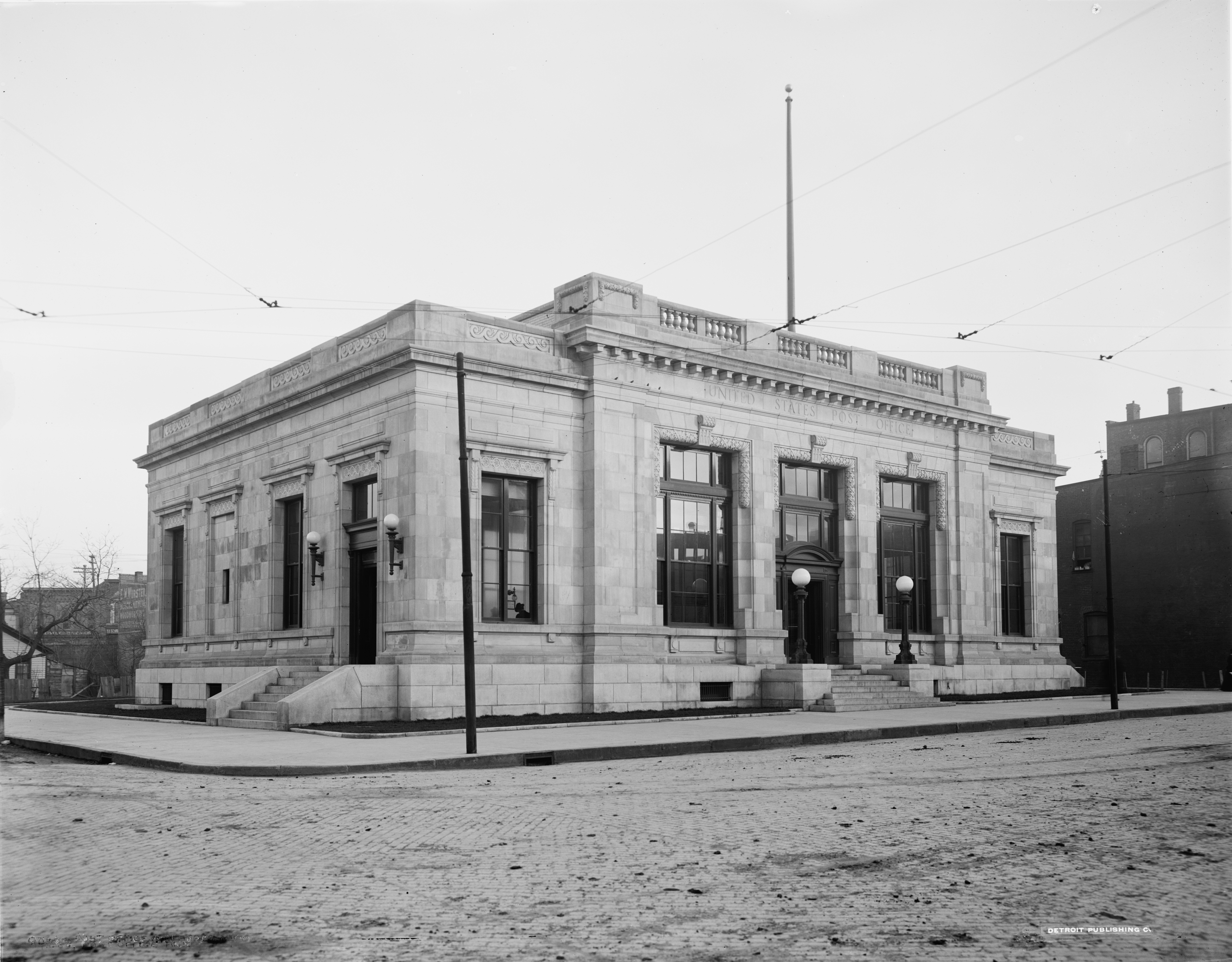
The building shortly after its construction

In 1903, Congress authorized funds to construct this building to house the postal services for Ann Arbor. However, actual money was not appropriated until 1906. The building site chosen was the site of Polhemus Livery Stable, which was razed to make room for the new post office. Plans for the new building were based on those drawn up by the staff at the US Treasury Department, and architect Fremont Ward supervised the construction. The builders C. Hoertz & Son of Grand Rapids, Michigan constructed the building. The building was not completed until 1909. A small brick addition was constructed in 1928. In 1932-33, a more substantial addition was constructed by Rice Construction Co. of Chicago, matching the style of the original construction seamlessly.

The building served as Ann Arbor's main post office until 1959, when the post office on West Stadium Blvd took its place. It continued to serve as a branch post office until 1977, when the post office was moved to the new federal building on East Liberty Street. Washtenaw County purchased the building and renovated it, and county employees moved into the building in the summer of 1981. The building now houses administrative offices for Washtenaw County, including a board room for the meetings of the Board of County Commissioners.

== Description ==
The Washtenaw County Administration Building is a single story rectangular building constructed of smooth gray limestone. The facade is symmetrical and divided into seven bays. Sculpted motifs decorate the facade. The original 1906 building was only five bays wide; the 1932 addition was carefully designed to seamlessly integrate both parts together.
