= William Doty =

American politician

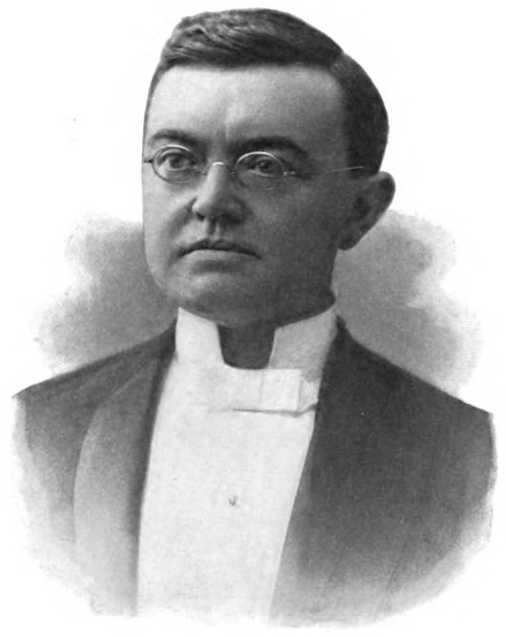

William G. Doty (6 September 1852 – 1919) was a Michigan lawyer and politician.

He was born in the village of Manchester, in Michigan's Washtenaw County. His grandfather, Samuel Doty, had served a term in the Michigan House of Representatives in 1838.

Doty was Mayor of Ann Arbor, Michigan, from 1891 to 1893. He was a member of the Freemasons and the Knights Templar.

| Preceded by Charles H. Manly | Mayor of Ann Arbor, Michigan; 1891–1893 | Succeeded by Bradley M. Thompson |
