= Economy in Ann Arbor, Michigan =

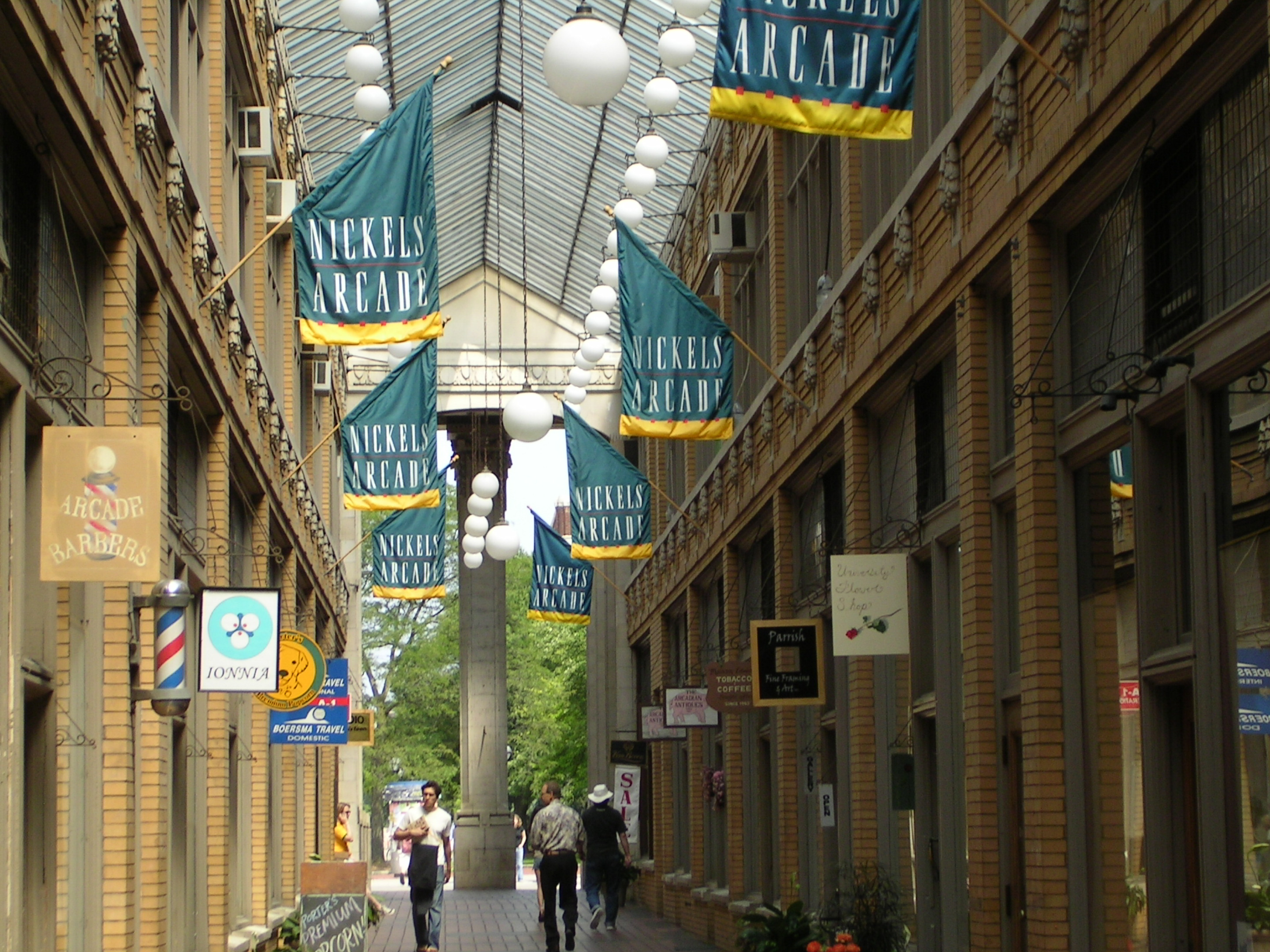
Nickels Arcade interior, looking towards the east

The University of Michigan shapes Ann Arbor's economy significantly. It employs about 30,000 workers, including about 12,000 in the medical center. Other employers are drawn to the area by the university's research and development money, and by its graduates. High tech, health services and biotechnology are other major components of the city's economy; numerous medical offices, laboratories, and associated companies are located in the city. Automobile manufacturers, such as General Motors and Visteon, also employ residents.

The recent surge in companies operating in Ann Arbor has led to a decrease in its office and flex space vacancy rates. As of December 31, 2012, the total market vacancy rate for office and flex space is 11.80%, a 1.40% decrease in vacancy from one year previous, and the lowest overall vacancy level since 2003. The office vacancy rate decreased to 10.65% in 2012 from 12.08% in 2011, while the flex vacancy rate decreased slightly more, with a drop from 16.50% to 15.02%.

== High tech ==
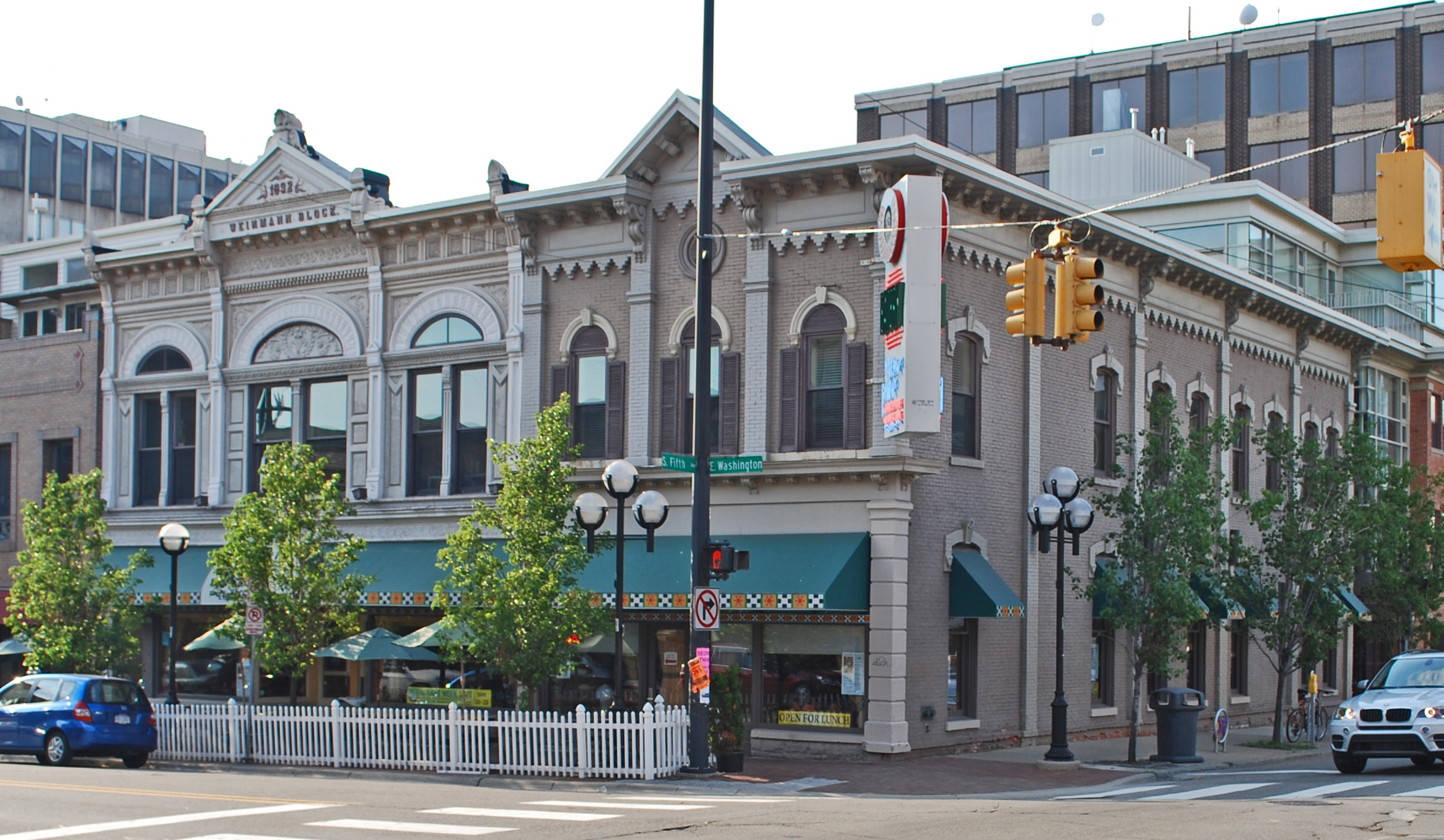
The Weinmann Block is listed on the NRHP

High tech companies have located in the area since the 1930s, when International Radio Corporation introduced the first mass-produced AC/DC radio (the Kadette, in 1931) as well as the first pocket radio (the Kadette Jr., in 1933). The Argus camera company, originally a subsidiary of International Radio, manufactured cameras in Ann Arbor from 1936 to the 1960s. Current firms include Arbor Networks (provider of Internet traffic engineering and security systems), Arbortext (provider of XML-based publishing software), JSTOR (the digital scholarly journal archive), MediaSpan (provider of software and online services for the media industries), Truven Health Analytics, and ProQuest, which includes UMI. Ann Arbor Terminals manufactured a video-display terminal called the Ann Arbor Ambassador during the 1980s. Barracuda Networks, which provides networking, security, and storage products based on network appliances and cloud services, opened an engineering office in Ann Arbor in 2008 on Depot St. and currently occupies the building previously used as the Borders headquarters on Maynard Street. Duo Security, a cloud-based access security provider protecting thousands of organizations worldwide through two-factor authentication, is headquartered in Ann Arbor. It was formerly a unicorn and continues to be headquartered in Ann Arbor after its acquisition by Cisco Systems. In November 2021, semiconductor test equipment company KLA Corporation opened a new North American headquarters in Ann Arbor.

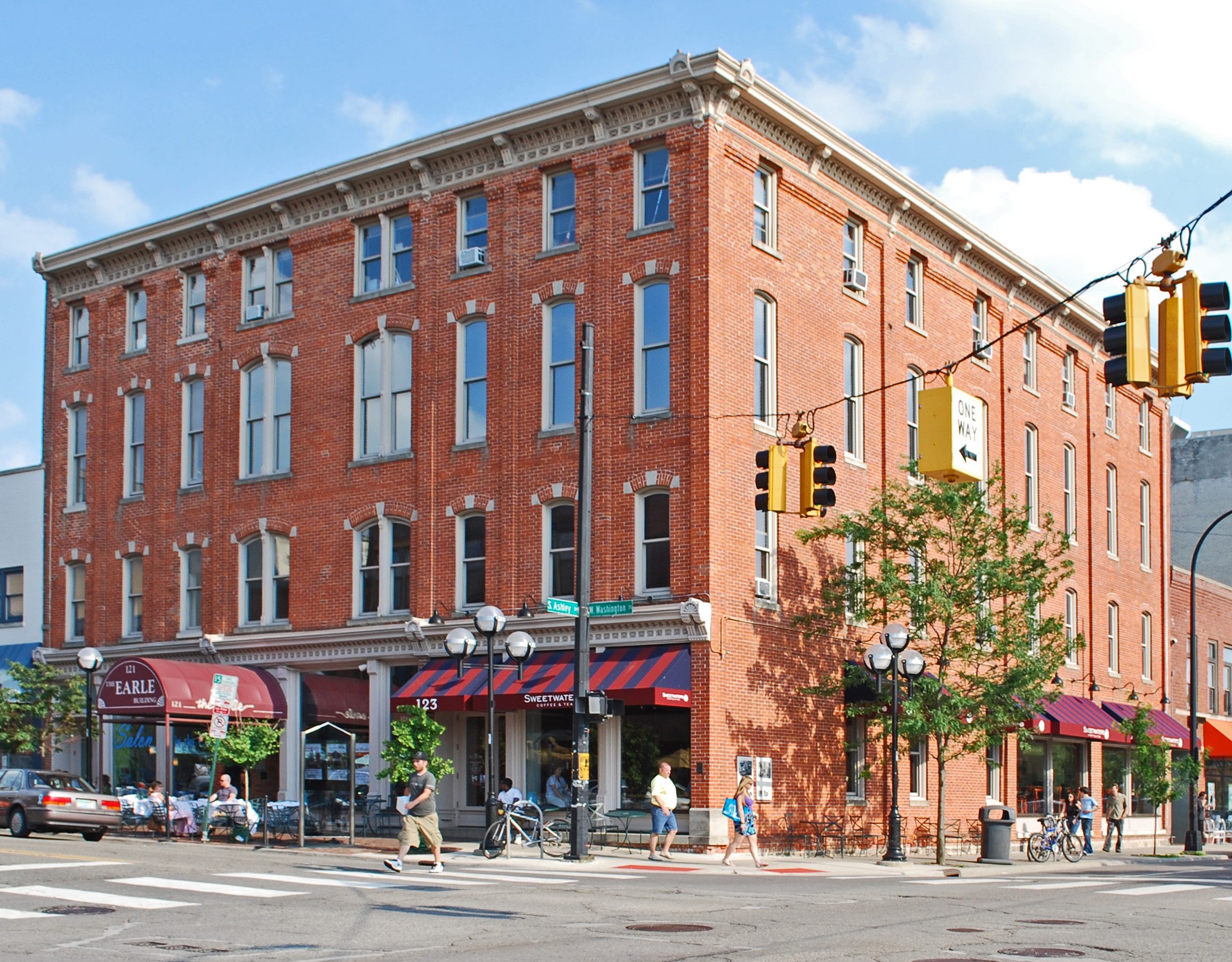
The Germania Building Complex is listed on the NRHP

Websites and online media companies that once had a major presence in or near the city include All Media Guide, the Weather Underground, and Zattoo. Ann Arbor is currently the home to Internet2 and the Merit Network, a not-for-profit research and education computer network. Both are located in the South State Commons 2 building on South State Street, which once housed the Michigan Information Technology Center Foundation. The city is also home to a secondary office of Google's AdWords program – the company's primary revenue stream.

As of 2022, Ann Arbor is home to more than twenty video game and XR studios of varying sizes. The city plays host to a regional chapter of the International Game Developers Association (IGDA) which hosts monthly meetups, presentations, and educational events.

== Research and development ==
Pfizer, once the city's second-largest employer, operated a large pharmaceutical research facility on the northeast side of Ann Arbor. On January 22, 2007, Pfizer announced it would close operations in Ann Arbor by the end of 2008. The facility was previously operated by Warner-Lambert and, before that, Parke-Davis. In December 2008, the University of Michigan Board of Regents approved the purchase of the facilities, and the university anticipates hiring 2,000 researchers and staff during the next 10 years. It is now known as North Campus Research Complex.

The city is the home of other research and engineering centers, including the Great Lakes Environmental Research Laboratory that is operated by NOAA and the Michigan Tech Research Institute. Other research centers sited in the city are the United States Environmental Protection Agency's National Vehicle and Fuel Emissions Laboratory and the Toyota Technical Center. The city is also home to National Sanitation Foundation International (NSF International), the nonprofit non-governmental organization that develops generally accepted standards for a variety of public health related industries and subject areas.

== Other companies based in Ann Arbor ==
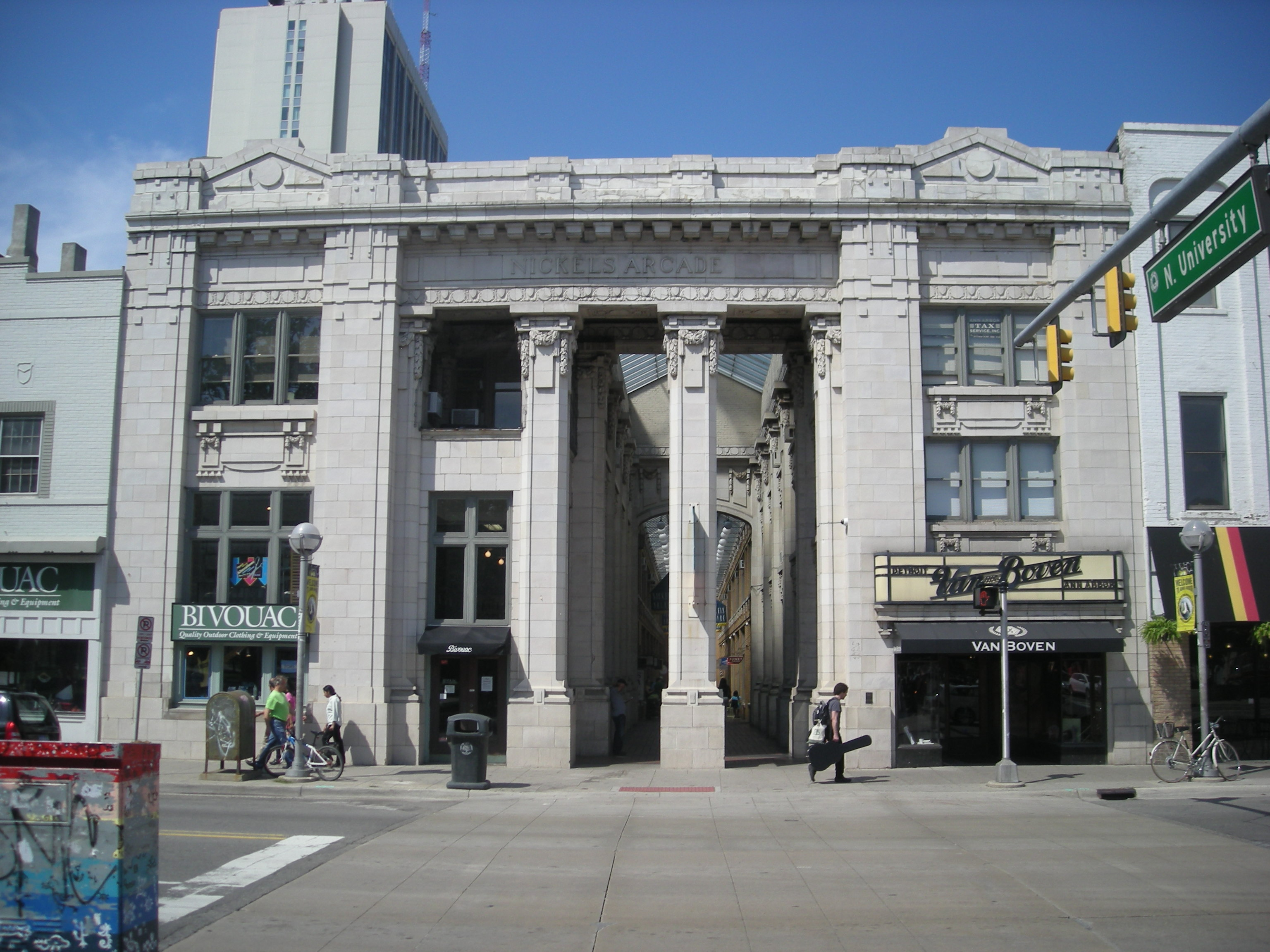
Nickels Arcade is the only extant example in Michigan of a free-standing commercial arcade building popularized by the Cleveland Arcade. It is listed on the NRHP.

Borders Books was opened by brothers Tom and Louis Borders in 1971 with a stock of used books. The Borders chain was based in the city, as was its flagship store until it closed in September 2011. Flint Ink Corp., another Ann Arbor-based company, was the world's largest privately held ink manufacturer until it was acquired by Stuttgart-based XSYS Print Solutions in October 2005.

Domino's Pizza's headquarters is near Ann Arbor on Domino's Farms, a 271-acre (110 ha) Frank Lloyd Wright-inspired complex just northeast of the city. Another Ann Arbor-based company is Zingerman's Delicatessen, which serves sandwiches and has developed businesses under a variety of brand names. Zingerman's has grown into a family of companies which offers a variety of products (bake shop, mail order, creamery, coffee) and services (business education). Avfuel, a global supplier of aviation fuels and services, is also headquartered in Ann Arbor.

The controversial detective and private security firm, Pinkerton is headquartered in Ann Arbor, being located on 101 N Main St.

== Cooperatives ==
Many cooperative enterprises were founded in the city; among those that remain are the People's Food Co-op and the Inter-Cooperative Council at the University of Michigan, a student housing cooperative founded in 1937. There are also three cohousing communities – Sunward, Great Oak, and Touchstone – located immediately to the west of the city limits.
