= Argus Museum =

Museum in Ann Arbor, Michigan

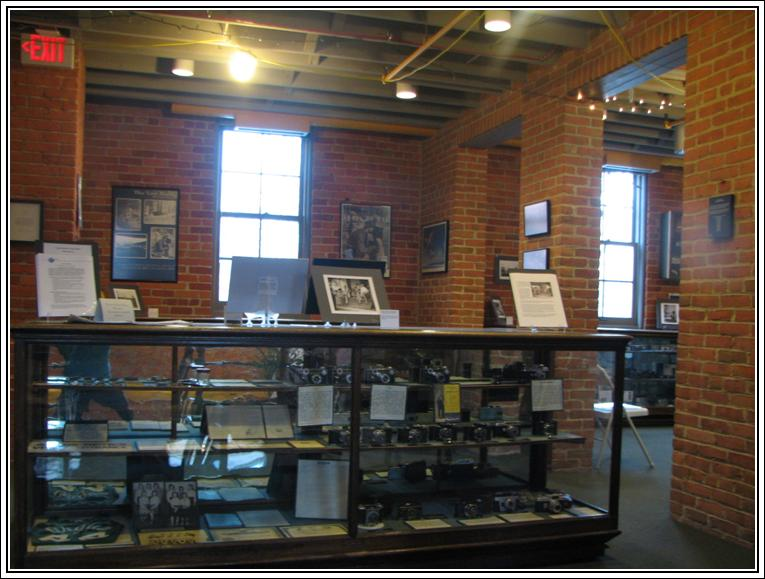
- A Gallery in the Argus Museum
- Established: 1987
- Location: Ann Arbor, Michigan
- Coordinates: 42.2779°N 83.7546°W

The Argus Museum, located on the second floor of 525 West William, Ann Arbor, Michigan, features products manufactured by the Argus camera company and tells the stories of the company, the people involved and showcases unique collections connected to Argus. The museum is housed in the Argus I Building, which was one of the facilities where Argus products were manufactured.

The mission of the Argus Museum is to collect and preserve Argus Camera Incorporated products (including those manufactured under its prior names), publications and history of the company and its employees, to research the products and the people who were involved in the development and manufacturing of these products, to insure these collections are available for others to research, and to interpret and display the collections for public viewing to promote knowledge and appreciation of Argus.

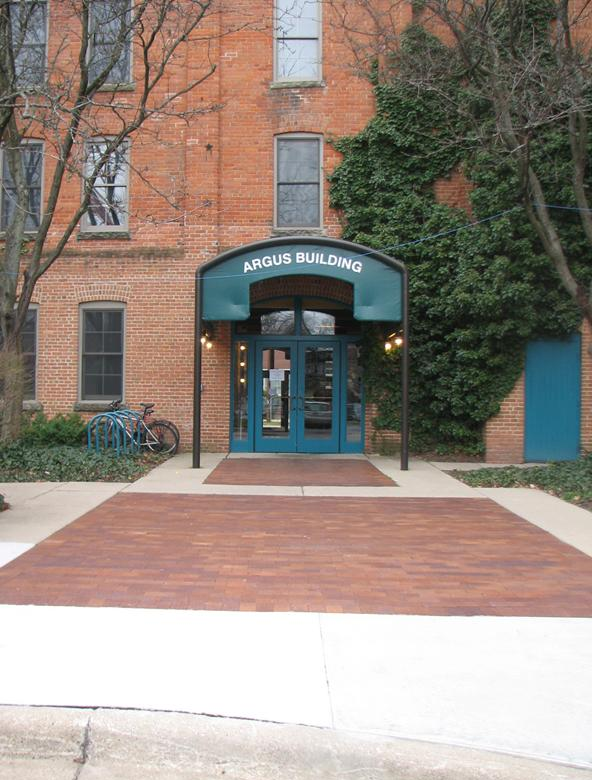
Argus Museum entrance in spring

== History and description of the museum ==
Established in 1987 with the acquisition of the Don Wallace Collection, the museum’s holdings include the rare 75, A4, C3 and C4 camera “giants” (large models used in trade shows), experimental model 12s, each with a different type of collapsing lens; and, various colors of the model A camera, favorites of collectors. Variations of the Model C3 camera (often referred to as The Brick), a common model of which over two million were sold, are on view. Employee memorabilia, including profit-sharing documents, employee identification badges and items related to the many sports and activities that Argus sponsored are also on display. Products that were manufactured under the company's names of International Radio Corporation, International Research Corporation, International Industries Incorporated, Argus Incorporated, and finally as Argus Camera Incorporated, are included in the displays. Many of company's cameras, projectors, viewers, meters and accessories, as well as darkroom equipment, manufactured throughout its history are exhibited.

Through military artifacts, the stories of the company's contributions to World War II and the Korean War, are told. Sighting devices, prisms and lenses are displayed. Included in the collection is a M72 Telescope used in Sherman Tanks, and a M18 sight used with Britain's 57mm anti-tank gun (the Britain Six-Pounder).

The museum’s archives include photographs, documents, instruction booklets, advertisements, correspondence and manuals. However, probably the greatest wealth of information can be found in the Argus Eyes, the company newsletter. Although articles on government contracts, profit sharing and new product lines are included, the majority of what is written involves personal employee milestones including births, marriages, deaths, retirements and anniversaries. Returning soldiers and those who were lost, social events, vacation reports, and humorous stories of the daily lives of Argus employees are often featured in articles.

The Argus I Building’s character lends itself to showcasing artwork. The museum presents photography exhibitions and features local and regional artists, particularly those who create images using film. The museum also hosts meetings, book signings, and an Argus Collector Group (ACG) Fall Conference.

=== History of the Argus I Building ===
- Originally the building was a wood structure and built c.1866. It first housed a cabinet-making shop and then a furniture manufacturing company.
- A four-story brick building was erected in 1879.
- In 1881 the original wooden structure was veneered with brick and joined to a four-story brick building by a brick addition.
- The International Radio Company (which would later become Argus Camera Incorporated), purchased the building in 1931.
- Several additions were constructed between 1940 and 1951 to accommodate increased business, particularly military contracts.
- In 1963, the University of Michigan became owners of the building.
- First Martin Corporation and O’Neal Construction purchased the building in 1983, and after rehabilitation, reopened the building in 1987.
