= Tony Vaccaro =

American photographer (1922–2022)

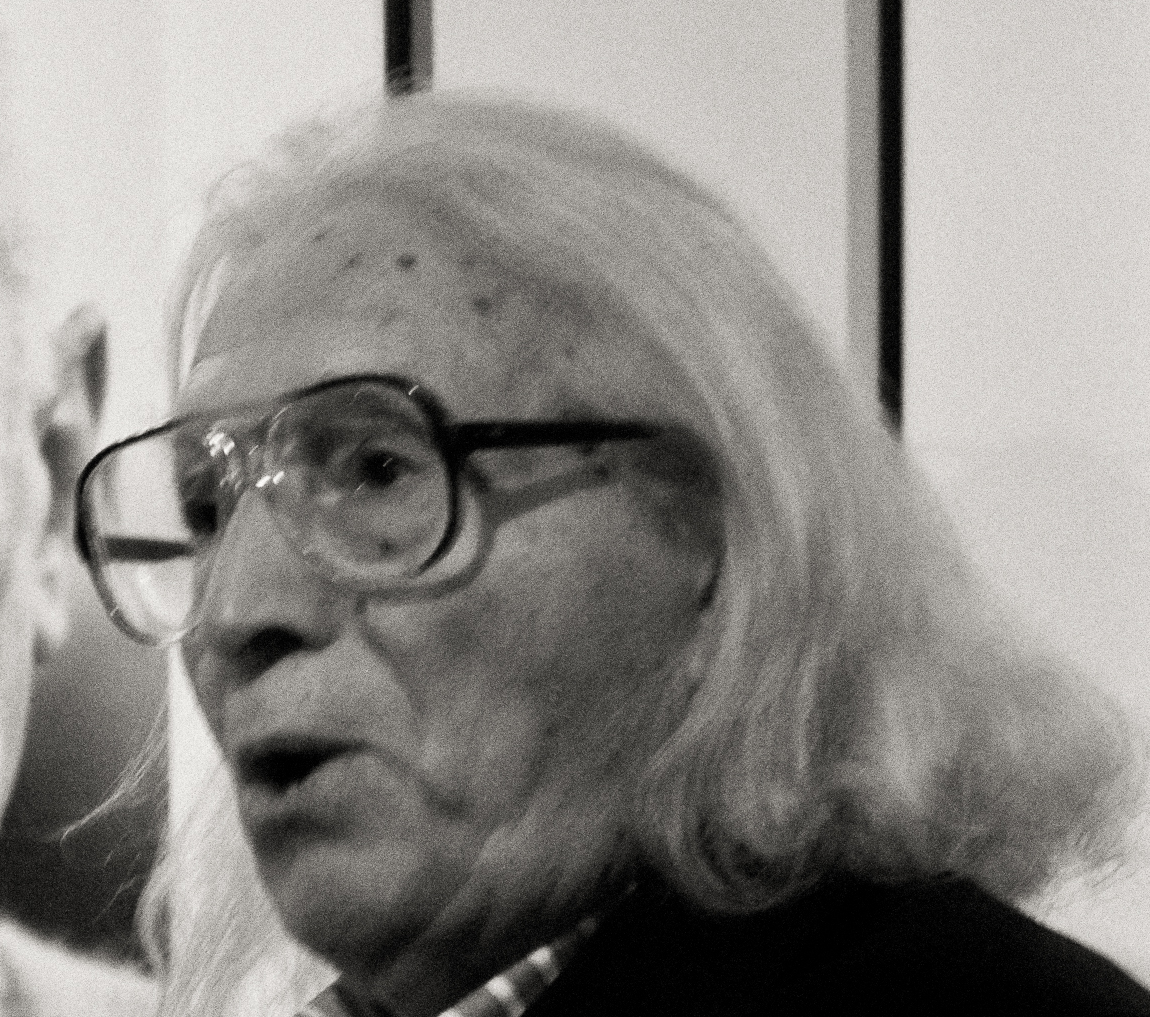
Vaccaro in 2009

Michelantonio Celestino Onofrio Vaccaro (December 20, 1922 – December 28, 2022) was an American photographer who is best known for his photos taken in Europe during 1944 and 1945, and in Germany immediately following World War II. He subsequently became a fashion and lifestyle photographer for American magazines.

== Biography ==
Michelantonio Celestino Onofrio Vaccaro was born in Greensburg, Pennsylvania, on December 20, 1922, to Italian immigrant parents. He was the second of their three children and the only boy. His father Giuseppe Antonio Vaccaro (b. October 14, 1874) was from Bonefro in the Molise region of Italy. In 1926, in the course of the family relocating to Italy, both his parents died; he was raised in Italy by his paternal grandmother where he was physically abused by his father's brother.

With the outbreak of World War II, Vaccaro moved back to the United States in order to escape military service in Italy. He graduated from Isaac E. Young High School in New Rochelle, New York, in 1943, and was drafted a few months later into the U.S. Army. He sought an assignment as a photographer with the Army Signal Corps offering photographs taken in high school as evidence of his talent, but was rejected because of his age despite complaining to the officer that the army considered him old enough to pull a rifle trigger, but not old enough to press a camera shutter.

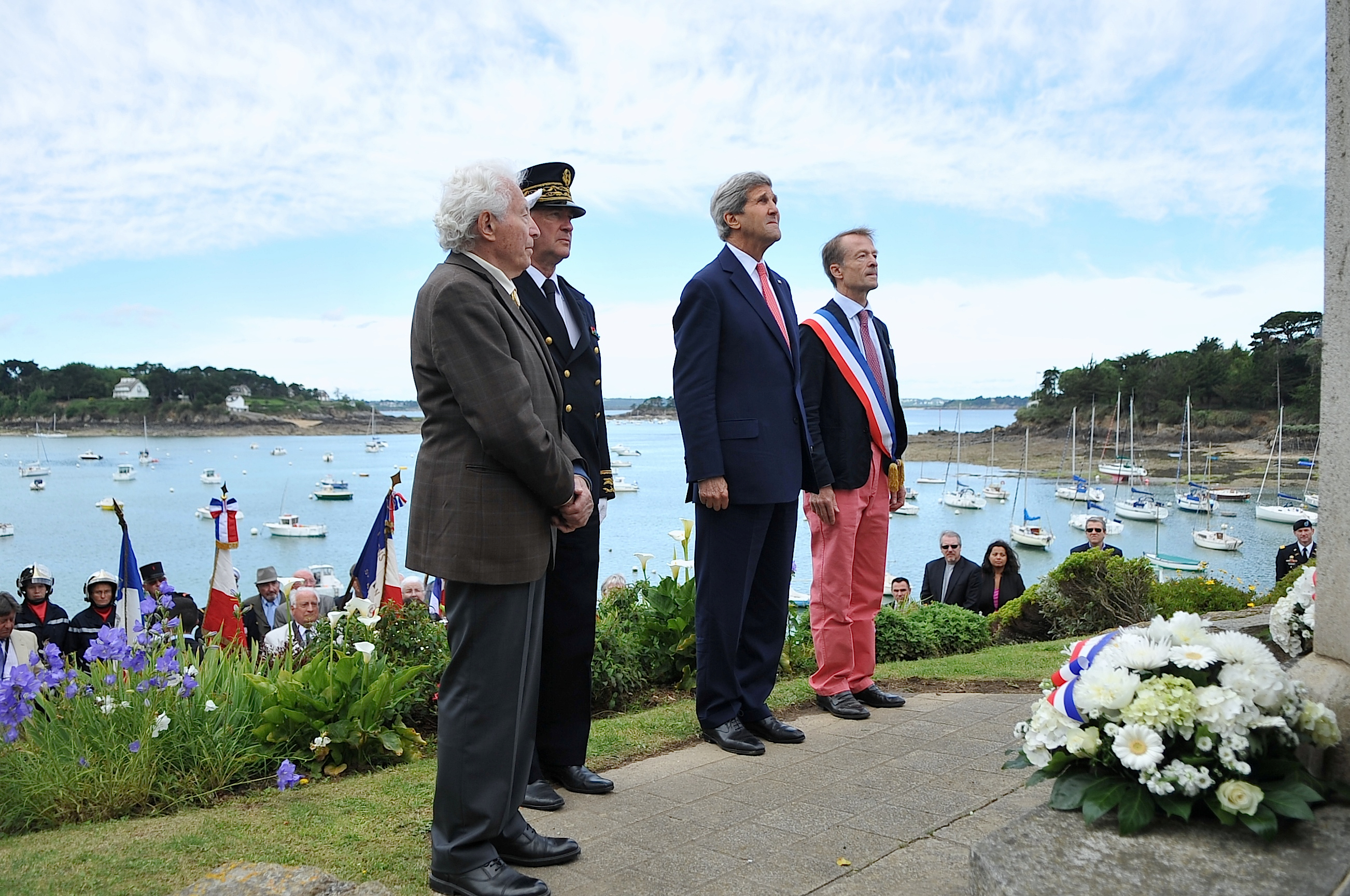
Vaccaro, left, at a ceremony marking the 70th anniversary of D Day, June 7, 2014

Instead, Vaccaro was sent to Europe as a private in the 83rd Infantry Division of the U.S. Army. He fought in Normandy, Belgium, Luxembourg, and Germany. His usual position as a scout provided him with the opportunity to take photographs with the Argus C3 compact 35mm rangefinder camera that he was adept at using. In September 1945, he was discharged from the army. Vaccaro stayed in Germany, where he obtained a job first as a photographer for Audio Visual Aids (AVA) stationed at Frankfurt, and then with Weekend, the Sunday supplement of the U.S. Army newspaper Stars and Stripes. Until 1949, Vaccaro photographed throughout Germany and Europe, documenting post-war life.

After his return to the U.S. in 1949, he worked for Flair and Look before joining the magazine Life. Between 1950 and 1973 Vaccaro worked extensively as a celebrity and fashion photographer.

He settled in the West Village in 1951 and then on Central Park West in 1955. From 1970 to 1980 he taught photography at Cooper Union. In 1979 he moved both his residence and studio along with his archive of hundreds of thousands of images, to Long Island City. He continued to spend his summers in Rome. He married Anja Lehto (1939–2013), a Finnish model, in 1963. They had two sons and separated in 1997. They met when Vaccaro was shooting a series about Marimekko for Life.

Although some 4,000 of his photographs were lost in an accident in 1947, photographs from his extensive wartime archive were published in 2001 in his book, Entering Germany: Photographs 1944-1949 and 2002 in the book Shots of War. In 1994, he was awarded France's Legion of Honour at the celebrations marking the fiftieth anniversary of the Normandy landings.

A museum named after Tony Vaccaro was inaugurated in Bonefro on August 24, 2014.

In 2002 German public television showed the film "Schnappschüsse vom Krieg" (Shots of War). The documentary film Underfire: The Untold Story of Pfc. Tony Vaccaro premiered at the Boston Film Festival on September 22, 2016 where it won the award for "Best Story", and aired on HBO on November 14. In 2021, Vaccaro's work was the subject of an exhibition in Helsinki, Finland.

In 2020 Vaccaro featured in the documentary film Tony & Santi alongside fellow photographer and long time friend, Santi Visalli. The film was directed by Andrew Davis. Tony & Santi had its World Premiere at the Santa Barbara International Film Festival and received critical acclaim.

In 2022, the American Battlefield Trust produced and released a short video on Vaccaro and his photographs from World War II.

== Awards and honors ==
- 1963 Art Directors Gold Medal, New York
- 1969 World Press Photo Gold Medal, The Hague
- 1985 Key to the City and "Tony Vaccaro Day", New Rochelle, New York (May 8)
- 1994 Legion of Honour, Paris, France (May 23)
- 1994 Le Trophee du Hommages, Caen, France
- 1994 La Flamme de la Liberté, Caen, France (June 12)
- 1995 Medal of Merit, Luxembourg City, Luxembourg
- 1995 Chevalier of the Ordre des Arts et des Lettres, Paris, France
- 1996 United States Postal Service: First day of issue, Georgia O'Keeffe stamp (May 23). The sheet reprinted alongside the stamps a photo Tony Vaccaro took of O'Keeffe in 1960.
- 1996 Diplome de Citoyen d'Honneur, Rochefort, France (August 4)
- 2002 Medal of Honor, Luxembourg City (June 16)
- 2002 Foire aux Noix, Bastogne, Belgium (December 21)
- 2003 Das Verdienstkreuz, Berlin, Germany (August 26)
- 2004 Großes Verdienstkreuz mit Stern, Knight Commander of the Order of Merit of the Federal Republic of Germany, German Consulate, New York City (February 21)
- 2014 f, Pescara, Italy (January 22)
- 2017 Honoree, Queens Council on the Arts (February 16)
- 2019 Inductee, International Photography Hall of Fame and Museum

== Publications ==
- Luxembourg by Tony Vaccaro, 1944-1945. Luxembourg: Lions Club Luxembourg Country. 1995. ISBN 2-87978-002-0.
- Tony Vaccaro: la mia Italia, fotografie 1945-1955. Berlin: Galerie Bilderwelt. 1996.
- Tony Vaccaro: Deutschland 1945 - 1949. Berlin: Galerie Bilderwelt. 1999.
- Entering Germany: Photographs 1944-1949. Taschen Verlag. 2001. ISBN 3-8228-5908-7.
- Shots of War - Vaccaro, Tony. Berlin: Galerie Bilderwelt. 2002. ISBN 9783905597349.
- Frank Lloyd Wright. Kirchentellinsfurth: Kultur-unterm-Schirm in collaboration with Galerie Bilderwelt. 2002.
- Tony Vaccaro. Retrospektive. 70 Jahre Fotografie. astfilm productions Berlin in collaboration with Galerie Bilderwelt and Reinhard Schultz.
- Shots of War - 1944-1945 - Tony Vaccaro. Berlin: Galerie Bilderwelt. 2002. ISBN 3-905597-34-9.
- Des Plages du Débarquement à Berlin, 1944-1945: Photographies de Tony Vaccaro (in French). Blérancourt: Musée national de la coopération Franco-américaine.
- Miller, Lee (2009). Tony Vaccaro - Scatti di Guerra (in Italian). Rome: Punctum Edizioni. ISBN 978-88-95410-34-0.
- Hennighausen, Amelia (Sept. 17, 2016). The Wall Street Journal, "Exposing a Life, From WWII to the West Village" https://graphics.wsj.com/glider/nyvaccaro0915-a879056d-64ed-4761-be46-f4a2d8e9e476
- Tony Vaccaro - Soldier with a camera 1944-1945. Luxembourg: Lions Club Luxembourg Country. 2017. ISBN 978-99959-0-315-2.

== See also ==
- Legion of Honour
- List of Legion of Honour recipients by name (V)
- List of foreign recipients of the Legion of Honour by country
- Legion of Honour Museum
