= Argus (camera company) =

Camera company

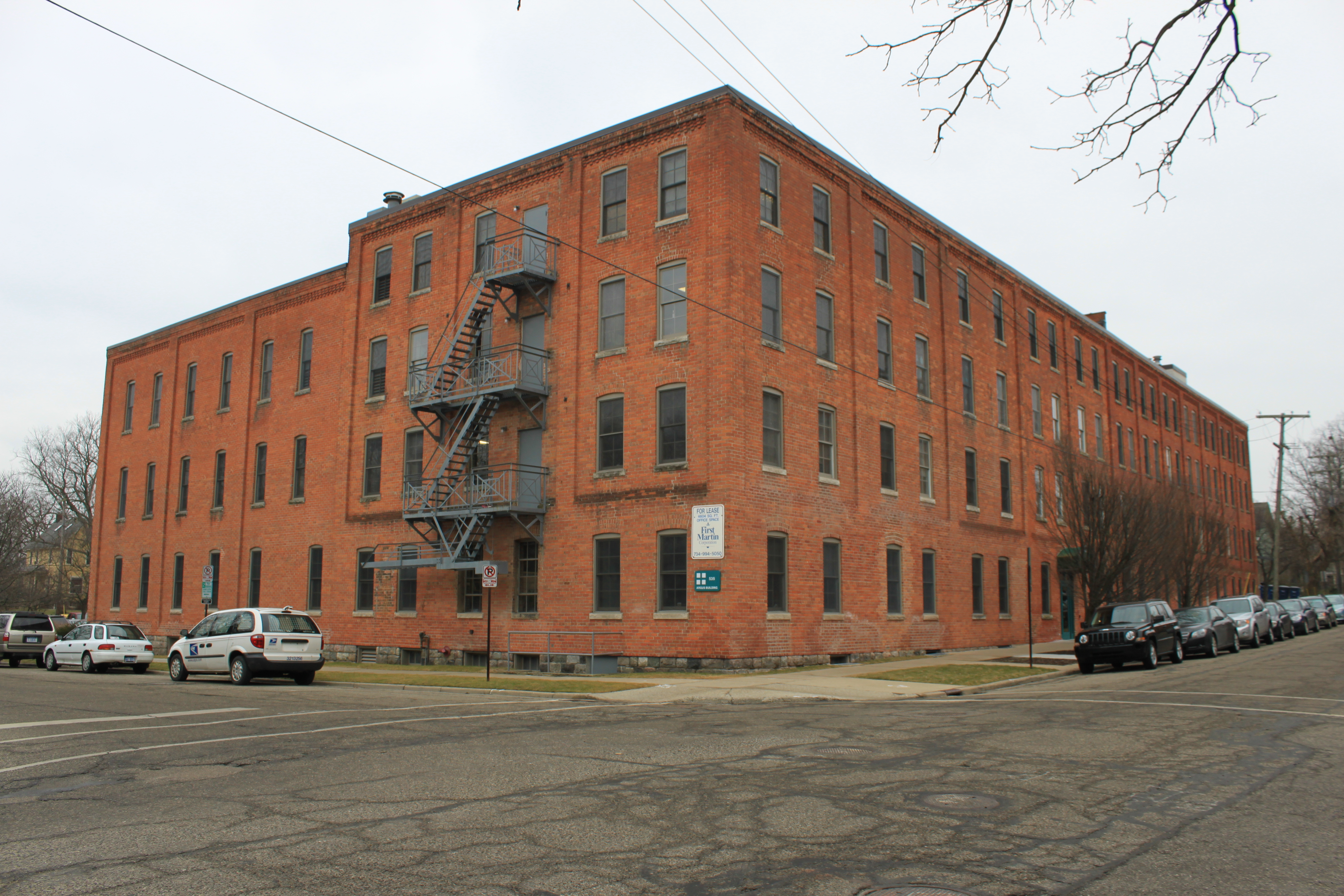
- Argus Building
- Industry: Cameras
- Founded: 1936; 89 years ago
- Defunct: 1969; 56 years ago
- Headquarters: Ann Arbor, Michigan, U.S.

Argus was an American maker of cameras and photographic products, founded in 1936 in Ann Arbor, Michigan. Argus originated as a subsidiary of the International Radio Corporation (IRC), founded by Charles Verschoor.

== History ==
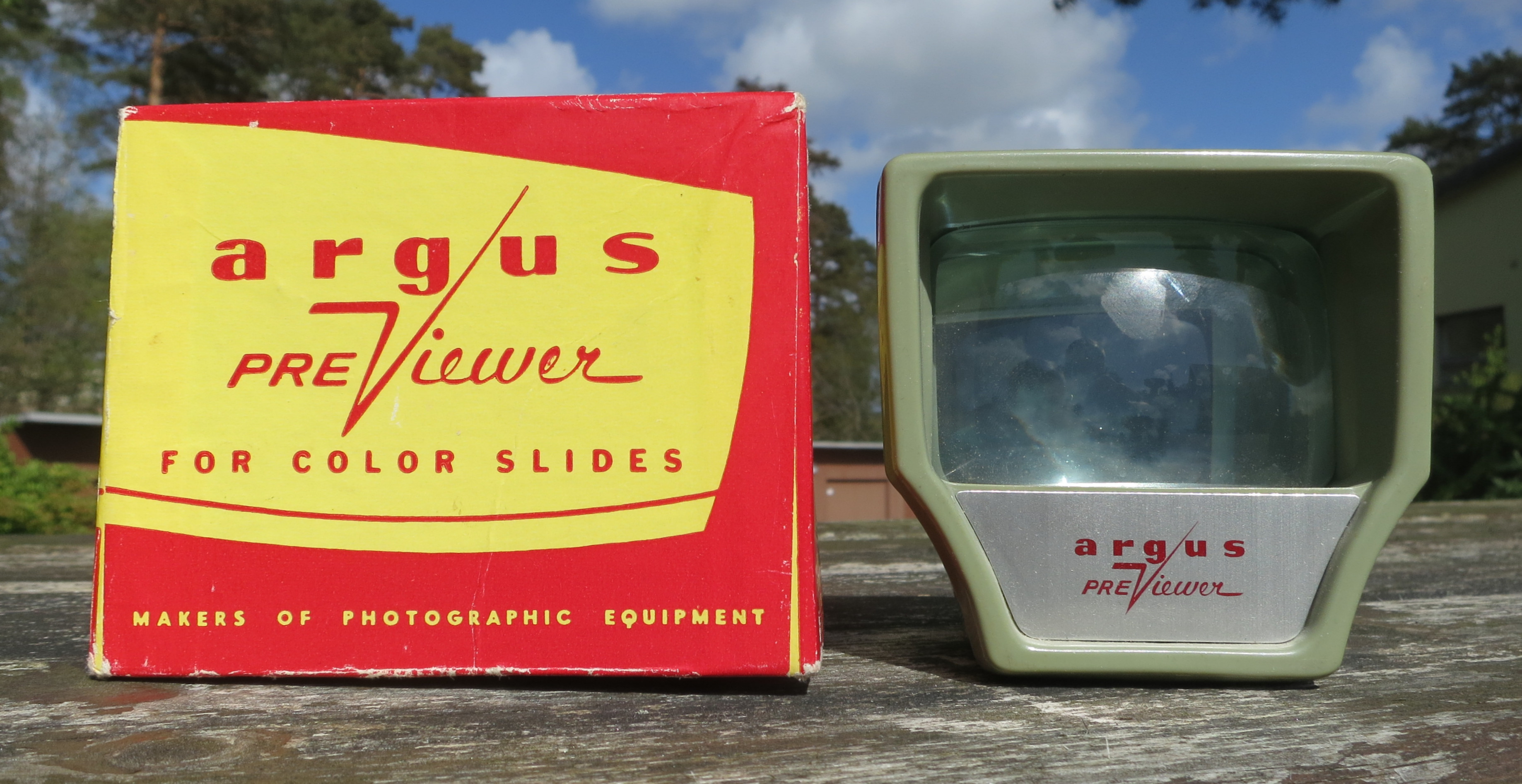
1960s portable Argus PreViewer color slide viewer

The International Radio Corporation was founded in 1931 by local businessman William E. Brown Jr., George J. Burke (who was a judge at the Nuremberg trials), and Charles Albert Vershoor. IRC started out selling a line of radios, developed by Verschoor, that had a body made out of molded plastic instead of wood. The Model A, the company's first camera, was introduced in May 1936.

In August 1942, the company stopped all domestic production and focused on producing military optics and radio equipment for the armed forces during World War II.

The company changed its name to Argus, Inc. in 1944. Argus introduced the Argus Model 21 in 1947, a metal-bodied camera and the company’s first model with an automatic shutter cocking to prevent double exposure and a hot shoe for flash.

By the end of World War II, Argus had won the Army-Navy “E” award five times for “excellence in design and manufacture of war-related material". Argus Inc. changed its name to Argus Cameras, Inc. in 1949.

Its best-known product was the C3 rangefinder camera, which enjoyed a 27-year production run and became one of the top-selling cameras in history. The company's Model A was the first low-cost 35 mm camera in the United States.

In 1956, the Argus 50mm f/2.8 Cintagon lens, designed for the C44 camera, was one of the first commercial lenses designed with the aid of a computer.

In 1957, Sylvania Electric Products acquired the company but continued to operate as Argus. In 1962, Sylvania sold the company to Mansfield Industries, an importer of photography products. By 1969 it had ceased camera production (some rebadged cameras continued to be sold under the Argus name through the 1970s).

More recently, the Argus brand has been reestablished, and is used on a variety of inexpensive digital cameras made by Argus Camera Company, LLC., located in Inverness, Illinois.

== Models ==
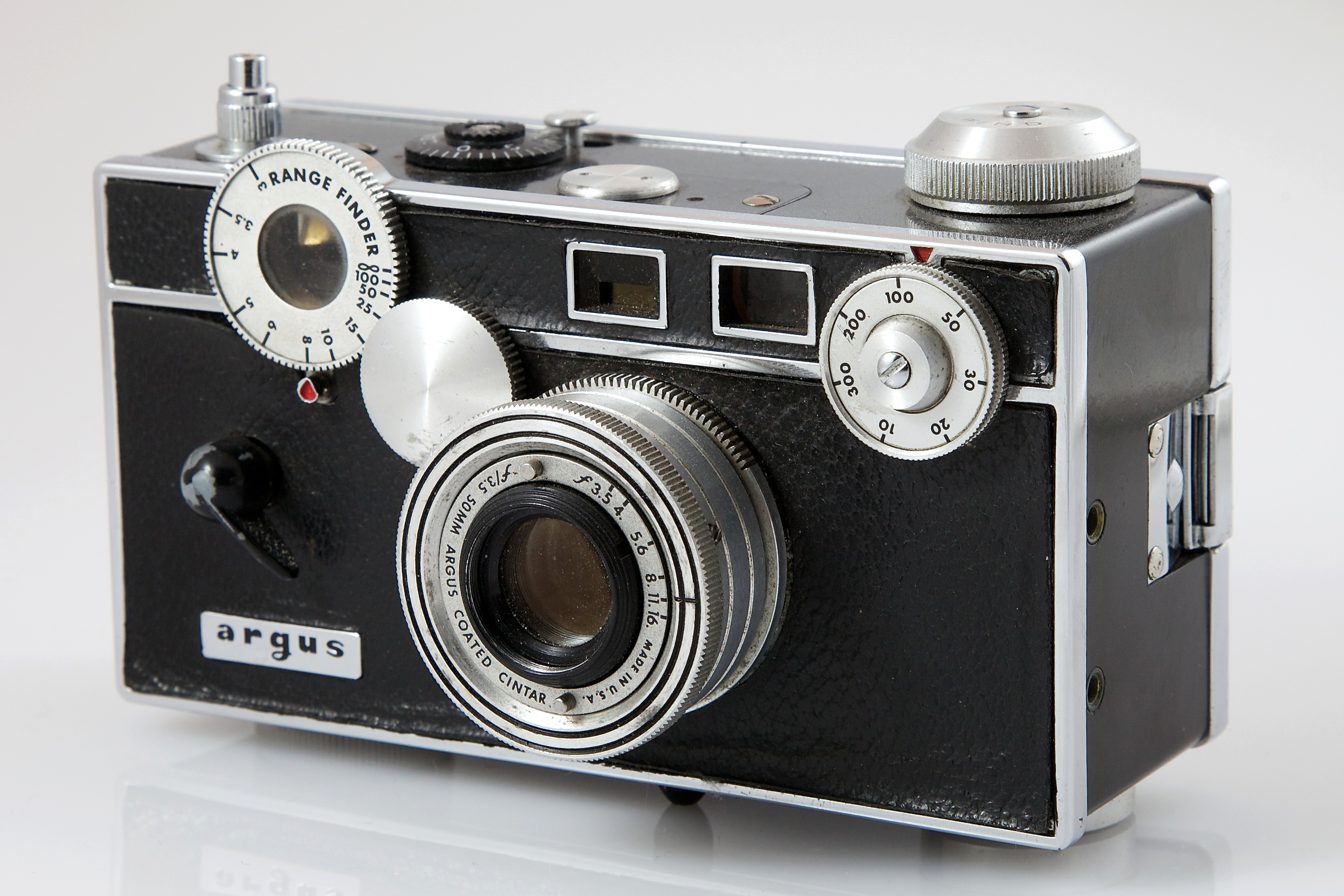
Argus C3

=== A series ===
- A (1936–1941)
- AF (1937–1938)
- B (1937)
- A2B (1939–1950)
- A2F (1939–1941)
- AA (1940–1942)
- FA (1950–1951)

=== C series ===
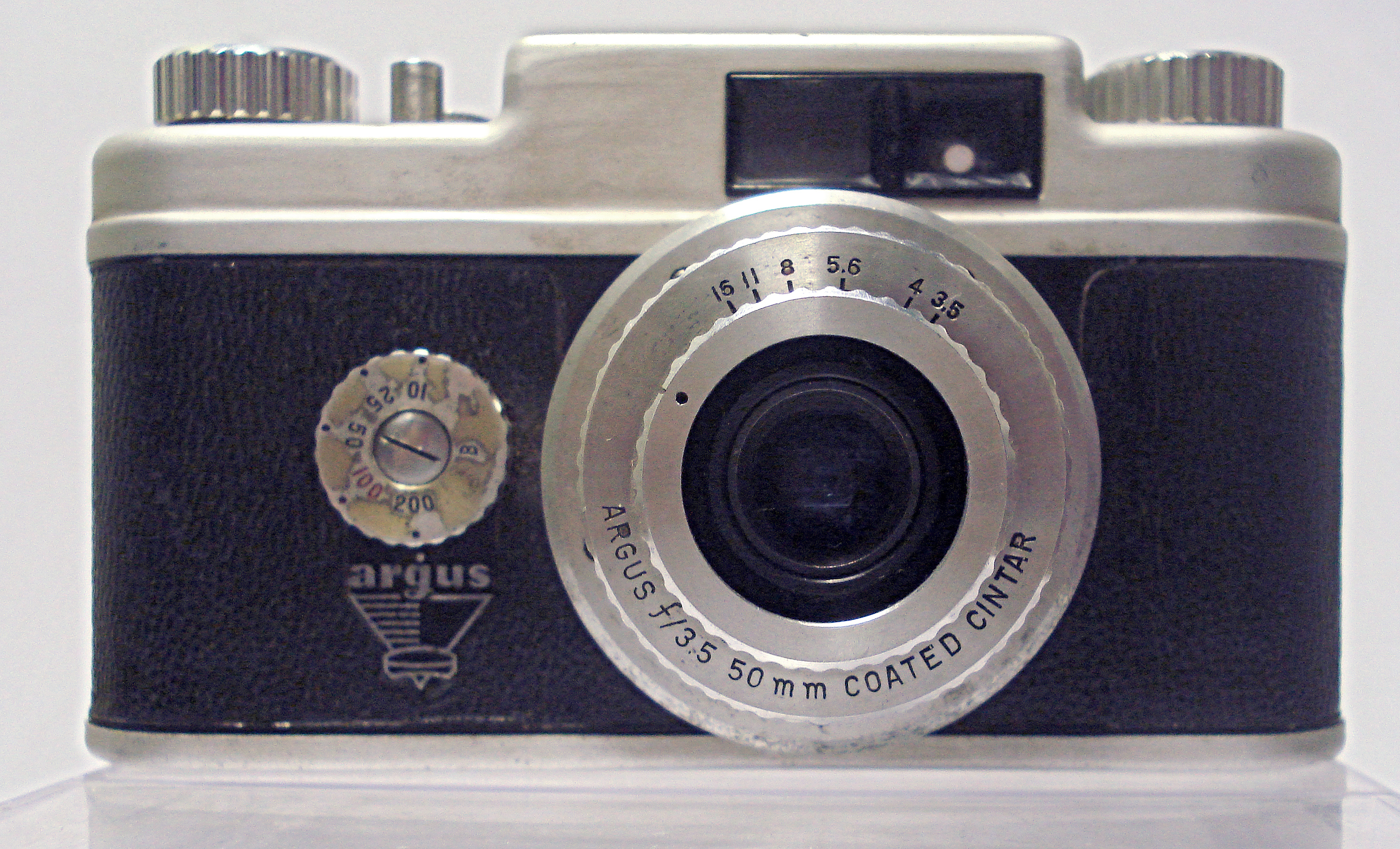
Argus 21

- C (1938–1939)
- C2 (1938–1942)
- C3 (1938–1968)
- 21 (1947–1952)
- C4 (1951–1957)
- C44 (1956–1957)
- C3 Golden Shield (1958–1966)
- C3 Matchmatic (1958–1966)
- C3 Standard (1958–1966)
- C44R (1958–1962)
- C4R (1958)
- C33 (1959–1961)

=== Argoflex ===
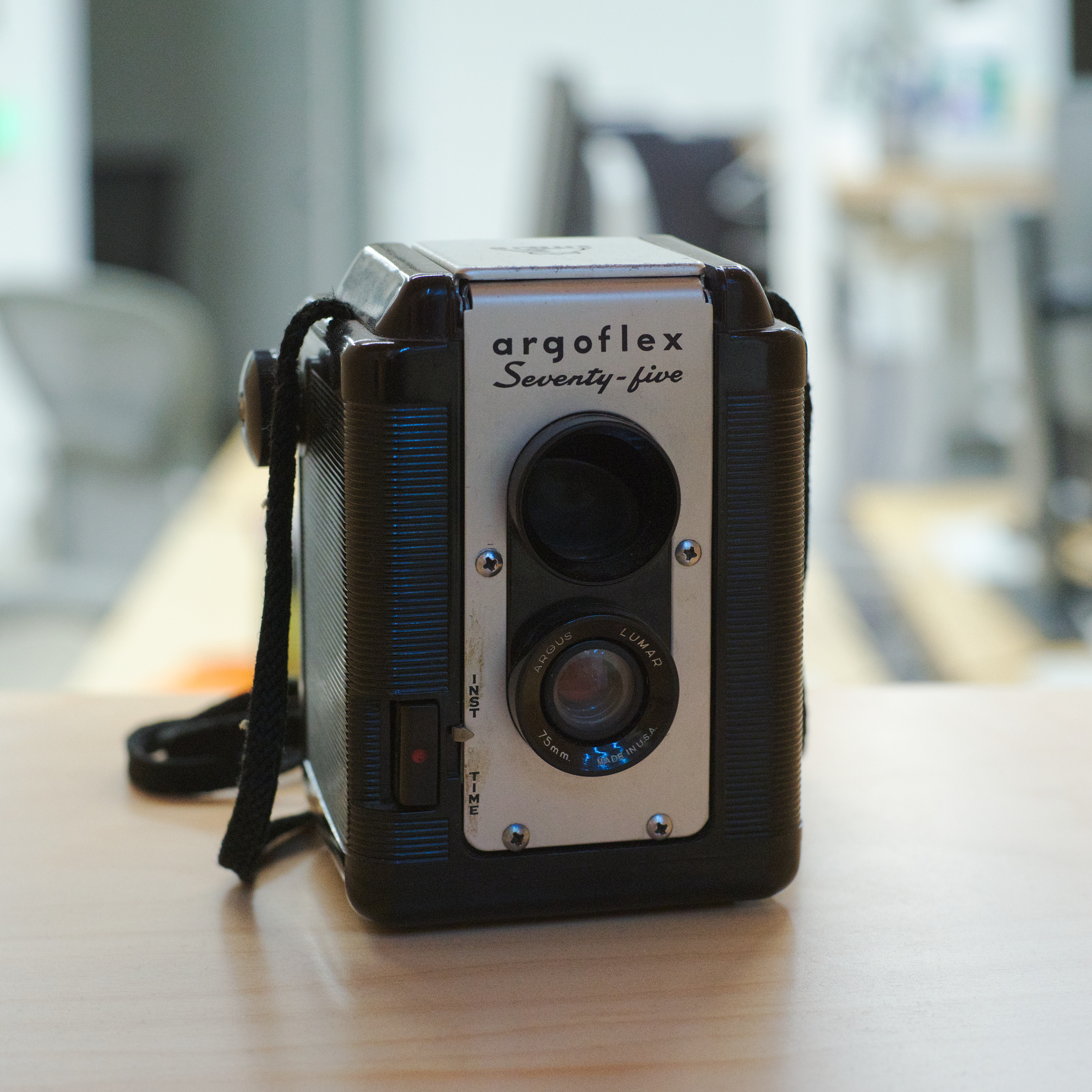
Argoflex Seventy-Five

- Argoflex E (1940–1948)
- Argoflex
- Argoflex II (1947)
- Argoflex EM (1948)
- Argoflex EF (1948–1951)
- Argoflex Seventy-Five (1949–1958)

- Argus Seventy-Five (made in Australia)

- Seventy-Five (1949–1958)
- 40 (1950–1954)
- Argoflex Forty (1950–1954)
- Super Seventy-Five (1954–1958)
- 75 (1958–1964)

=== Autronic ===
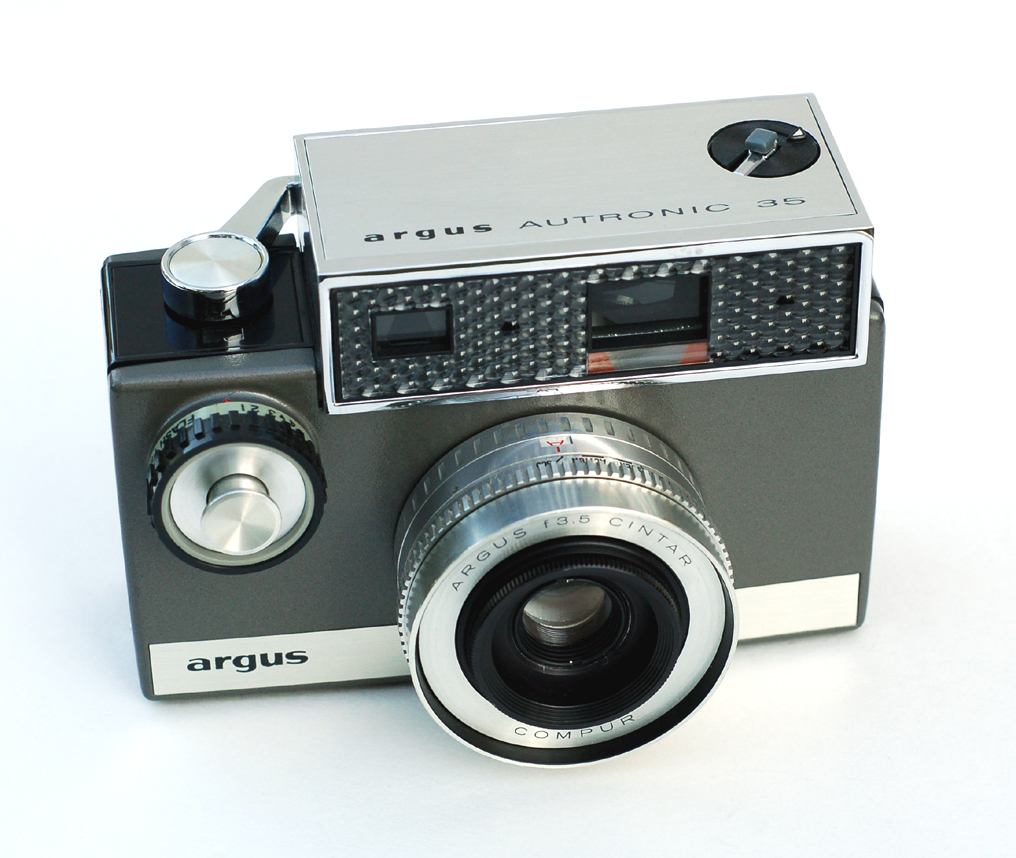
Argus Autronic 35

- Autronic 35 (1960 only)
- Autronic C3 (1960–1962)
- Autronic I (1962–1965)
- Autronic II (1962–1965)

=== Other models ===
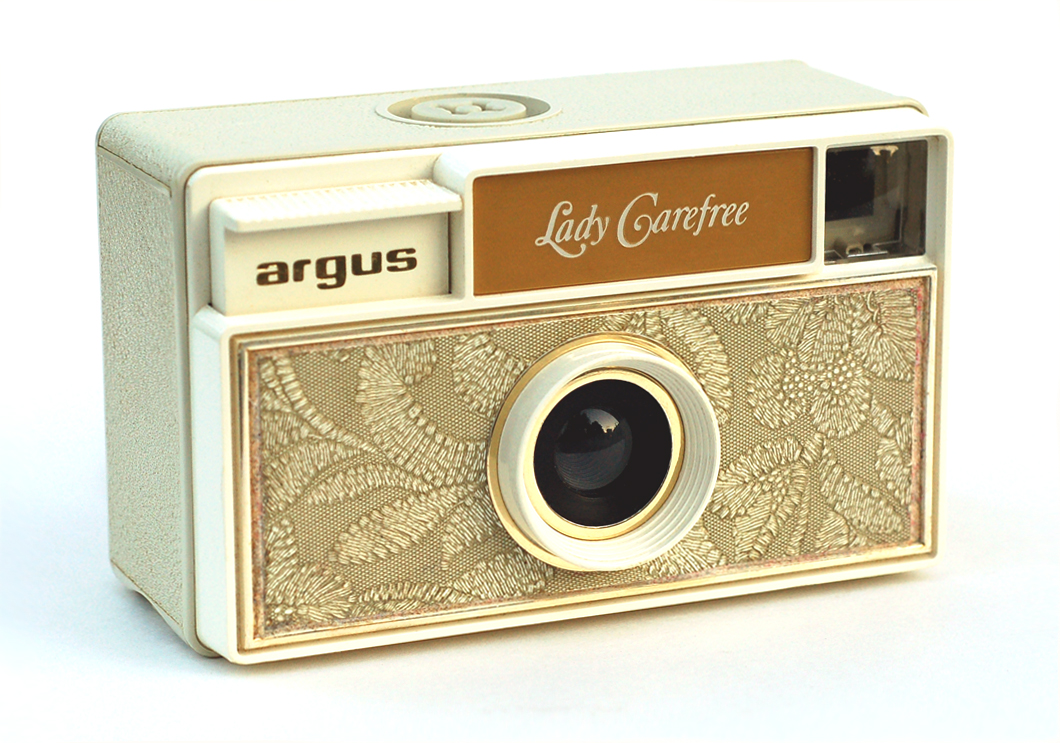
Argus Lady Carefree, plastic camera for 126 mm film cartridges, c. 1967

- K (1939–1940)
- M (1939–1940)
- A3 (1940–1942)
- CC (1941–1942)
- Minca (1947–1948)
- A5 (1953–1956)
- A-Four (1953–1956)
- C-Twenty (1957–1958)
- Lady Carefree (126, circa 1967)
- Carefree (126)

=== Digital ===
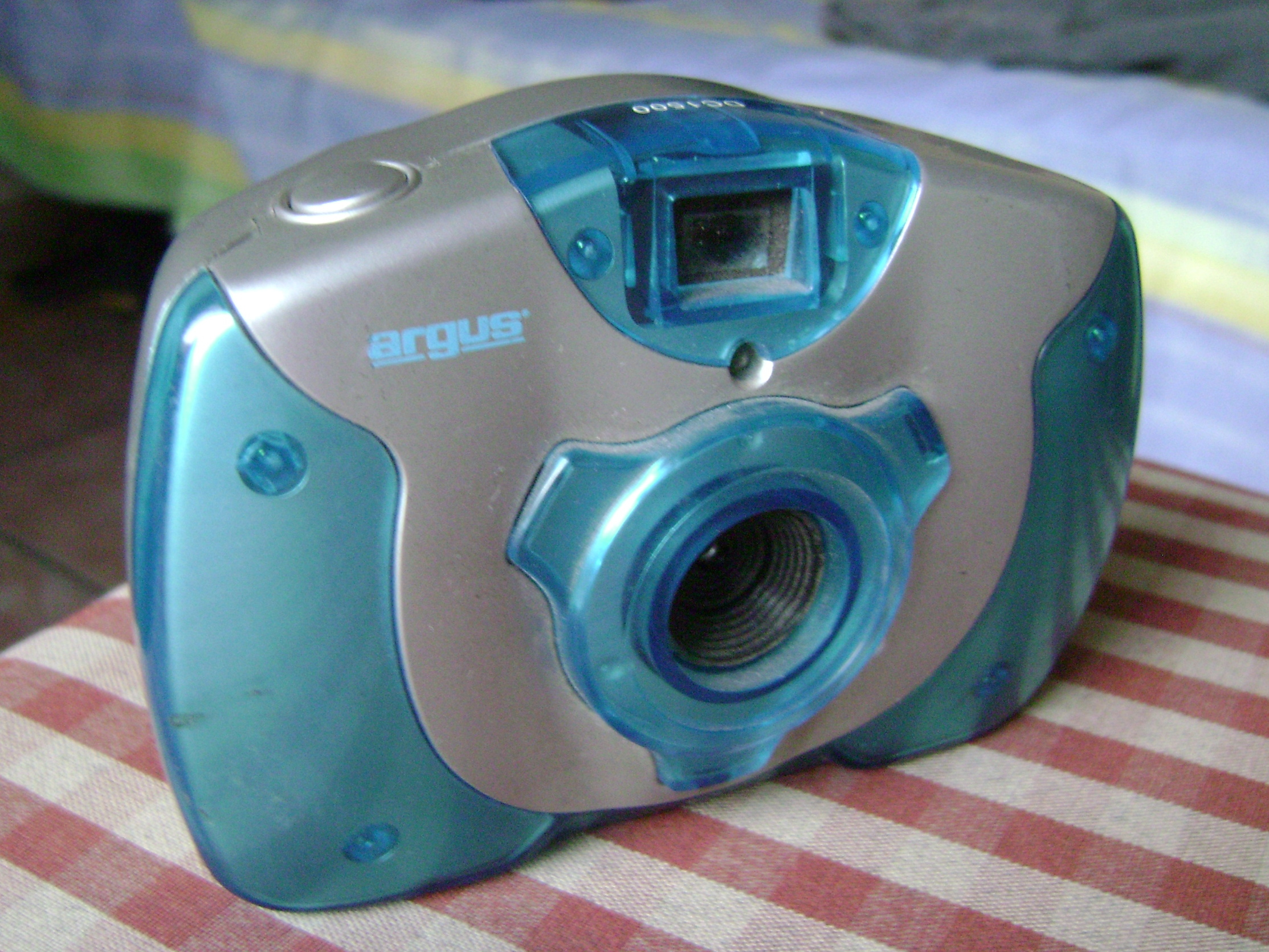
Argus DC1500

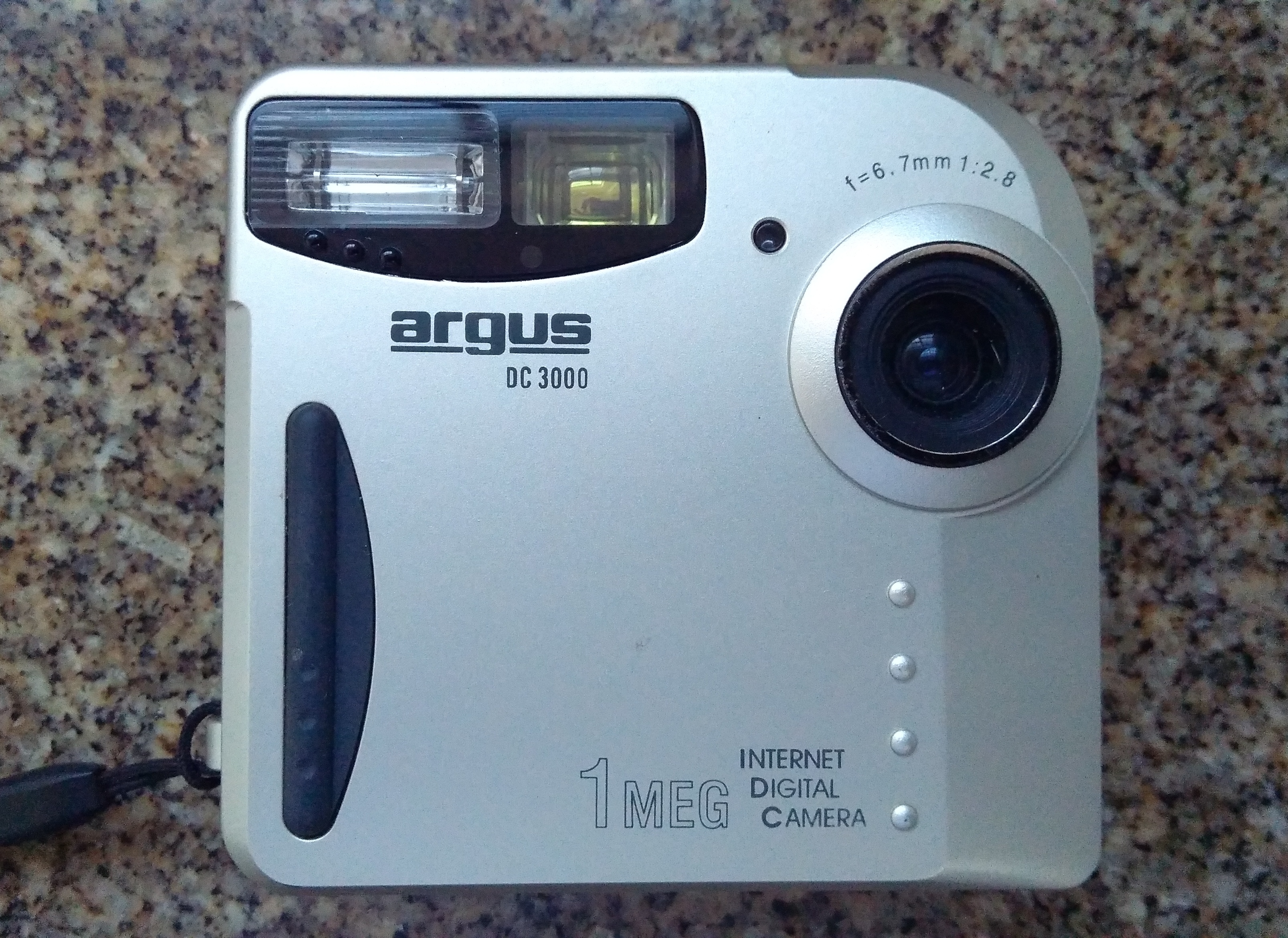
Argus DC3000

- DCV-011
- DCM-098
- DCM-099
- DC-1088
- DC-1500
- DC-1512E
- DC-2185
- DC-2700
- DC-3000 (May 2000)
- DC-3185
- DC-3190
- DC-3195
- DC-3270DV
- DC-3550
- DC-5190
- DC-5195
- DC-5340
- DC-6340

== Awards ==
Argus had two cameras for children developed in partnership with TEAMS Design. The cameras, the Bean and Sprout, won a Bronze 2009 IDEA award from Bloomberg BusinessWeek and the Industrial Designers Society of America in addition to an Appliance Design 2009 EID award.

== See also ==
- Argus Museum
