= Santi Visalli =

American photojournalist

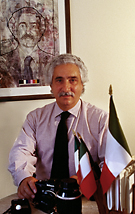
- Santi Visalli in his New York City studio in 1998
- Born: February 23, 1932 (age 94); Messina, Sicily
- Citizenship: Dual US-Italian
- Education: IstitutoTecnico Economico Statale-Messina
- Occupation: Photojournalist
- Spouse: Gayla Beth Jung (1961–present)
- Children: Ivon; Anthony
- Website: http://www.santivisalli.com/

Santi Visalli is an American photographer and photojournalist who covered the news from social issues to politics to lifestyles to entertainment for over 40 years beginning in the 1960s.

== Biography ==
Born in Messina, Sicily, Santi Visalli left Italy in 1956 to begin a three-year journey around the world by jeep that ultimately landed him in New York City. It was in New York, that he began his career in photojournalism. From 1961 to 1984, Visalli's photos appeared in and on the covers of some 50 magazines and newspapers worldwide, including The New York Times, Newsweek, Time, Life, U.S. News & World Report, Forbes, American Heritage, Paris Match, Stern, Oggi, Epoca, and L'Europeo.

Santi Visalli chose the camera as an instrument of communication to reach a large audience. As he himself says, "Photography speaks a universal language." During the 1960s and '70s, people around the world saw America through his eyes.

Throughout the course of his career, he photographed five presidents of the United States: Lyndon B. Johnson, Richard Nixon, Jimmy Carter, Ronald Reagan, and Bill Clinton. He also worked on films with such directors as Federico Fellini, Lina Wertmüller, and Peter Yates and photographed numerous film stars and other famous personalities in various fields, including Andy Warhol. He started photographing Warhol early in 1963 and continued until December 31, 1986, three months before Warhol's sudden death.

Expanding to a more permanent form of photojournalistic expression—coffee table books—Visalli created 14 full-color cityscapes published by Rizzoli: Chicago (1987, 2003, 2004, 2005, 2007), Boston (1988), San Francisco (1990, 2002), Los Angeles (1992), Miami (1993), New York ( 1980,1985) (New York 1994 Universe Publishing), Washington, D.C. (1995), and Las Vegas (1996). Each runs more than 200 pages and took him a year or more to shoot. In 2009 in Italy, Vianello published his book Icons, a collection of b&w photos of important people of the 1960s through the 1990s.

His Fine-art photographs are in many private collections, and five are in the permanent collection of the Santa Barbara Museum of Art. Among Visalli's personal favorites are his photo of the World trade center (the most popular of any in his collection). Two other favorites are his special view of the New York Stock Exchange and the portrait of Sofia Loren. However, Visalli views all his pictures as if they were his children. "They are all good," he says.

Mr. Visalli has appeared on American, Brazilian, Japanese, and European radio and television programs, including a RAI-TV special on the most important Sicilians in the arts in New York. He is a former president of the Foreign Press Association of New York, whose 400 members, representing 60 countries, cover the United States for the world, and he served on the board of the Association of Italian Correspondents in North America.

In 2020 Visalli featured in the documentary film Tony & Santi alongside fellow photographer and long time friend, Tony Vaccaro. The film was directed by Andrew Davis. It had its World Premiere at the Santa Barbara International Film Festival and received critical acclaim.

== Exhibitions ==
- American Scrapbook: Three Photojournalists, 75 Years (1980), with Lewis Hine and Michael (Tony) Vaccaro, a critically acclaimed show featuring news photos of America from the turn of the 20th century to the 1970s.
- A Love Affair with New York City (1981), broke attendance records at Nikon House in Rockefeller Center, attracting more than 11,300 visitors.
- La Magna Grecia: The Greek Heritage in Calabria (1984), initially exhibited at the Rizzoli Gallery in New York City, won multiple awards.
- A Walk Through Urban America (1992), celebrating the 500th anniversary of America, sponsored by the Italian Cultural Institute in New York City.
- Impressions of America (1997), a one-man show in St. Augustine, Florida
- Made in Santa Barbara (2007), a group show of works by local photographers at the Santa Barbara Museum of Art
- Santi Visalli: Icons (2007), a super selection of movie people at Sullivan Goss Gallery, Santa Barbara
- The Famous and the Infamous (2009), personalities and political protests of the 1960s and ‘70s in America at Wave Gallery in Brescia, Italy.
- Icons of the Performing Arts (2010) at the Granada Theatre, Santa Barbara
- Warhol: Dylan to Duchamp (2010) group show at Eric Firestone Gallery, Tucson, Arizona
- Santi Visalli Photojournalist (2010) University Art Gallery at California Polytechnic State University, San Luis Obispo
- A Walk Through Urban America (2011), cityscapes of America's most important cities at the Chamber of Commerce in Messina, Italy
- Warhol: Headlines (2012), Museum Für Moderne Kunst, Frankfurt, Germany

== Honors ==
- In 1996, he was made a Knight in the Order of Merit of the Republic of Italy.
- In 2011, he was awarded a medal for his life achievements by the President of the Italian Republic.

== Books ==
- Visalli, Santi: Chicago, Rizzoli, October 2005, ISBN 978-0-8478-2659-9
- Visalli, Santi: Boston, Rizzoli, 1988, ISBN 978-0-8478-0997-4
- Visalli, Santi: San Francisco, Rizzoli, 1990, ISBN 978-0-8478-1243-1
- Visalli, Santi: Los Angeles, Rizzoli, 1992, ISBN 0-8478-1590-0
- Visalli, Santi: Miami, Rizzoli, 1993, ISBN 0-8478-1716-4
- Visalli, Santi: New York (The Magnificent Great Cities), Universe Publishing, September 15, 1995, ISBN 978-0-7893-0003-4
- Visalli, Santi: Washington, DC, Universe, November 15, 1996, ISBN 978-0-7893-0054-6
- Visalli, Santi: Las Vegas, Universe, November 15, 1996, ISBN 0-7893-0074-5
- Visalli, Santi: Icons, Antique Collectors Club Dist, 2010, ISBN 88-7200-315-6
