= Argus C3 =

35mm film camera

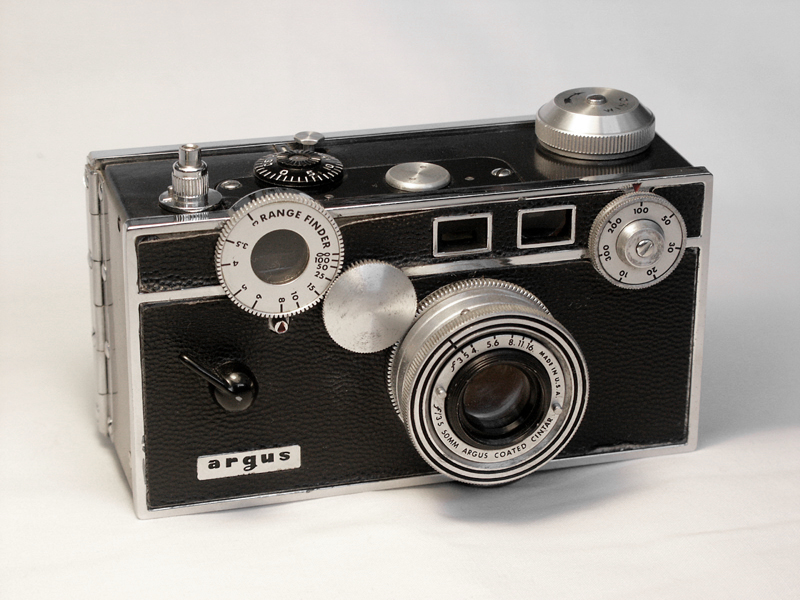
- Argus C3

Overview
- Maker: Argus
- Released: October 1939

Lens
- Lens mount: Screw mount
- Lens: Interchangeable

Sensor/medium
- Film format: 35 mm
- Film size: 35 mm × 24 mm
- Film advance: Manual
- Film rewind: Manual

Focusing
- Focus: Coupled rangefinder

General
- Made in: Ann Arbor, Michigan, USA

The Argus C3 (aka Argus C-3) was a low-priced rangefinder camera mass-produced from 1939 to 1966 by Argus in Ann Arbor, Michigan, United States. The camera sold over 2.2 million units, making it one of the most popular American cameras in history. Due to its shape, size, and weight, it is commonly referred to as "The Brick" by photographers (in Japan its nickname translates as "The Lunchbox"). The most famous 20th-century photographer who used it was Tony Vaccaro, who employed this model during World War II.

== History ==
The C3 was introduced in October 1939 as an improved version of the C (1938) and C2 (1938–42). All three models shared the same "brick" design, attributed to Gustave Fassin, but the C3 was by far the most successful. The original Argus C was equipped with an uncoupled rangefinder that required the user to manually rotate the lens barrel to match the rangefinder reading, while the C2 coupled the rangefinder to the lens to allow one-step focusing. The C3 added built-in flash synchronization, but was otherwise identical to the C2. It originally retailed for $35 (equivalent to $810 in 2025).

The C3 proved hugely successful, selling approximately 2 million units during its 27-year production run. Although the boxy design was neither stylish nor ergonomic, customers were reportedly drawn to the camera's "scientific" appearance with its many gears, knobs, and dials. The C3 also developed a reputation for rugged durability and sharp, high-quality images. Photographers affectionately nicknamed it "the brick". The C3's enduring popularity allowed it to outlast nearly all of its American competitors, including the Kodak 35 Rangefinder, but it was not able to compete with the flood of inexpensive Japanese single lens reflex cameras entering the market in the 1960s and was finally discontinued in 1966.

Although the design is over 75 years old, many C3s are still in use. The cameras are inexpensive on the used market and their simple construction makes them relatively easy to repair.

== Specifications ==
The C3 was constructed primarily of bakelite with metal castings for the front and back. The design featured an unusual but simple diaphragm shutter built into the camera body, so the camera could make use of interchangeable lenses without the need for a complex focal plane shutter. The rangefinder was separate from the viewfinder and was coupled to the lens through a series of gears located on the outside of the camera body. The camera came equipped with a 50 mm f/3.5 Cintar anastigmat triplet lens. The lenses were made under contract by Bausch & Lomb, Ilex, and Graf Optical, which was taken over by Argus in 1939, with varying quality.

== Models ==
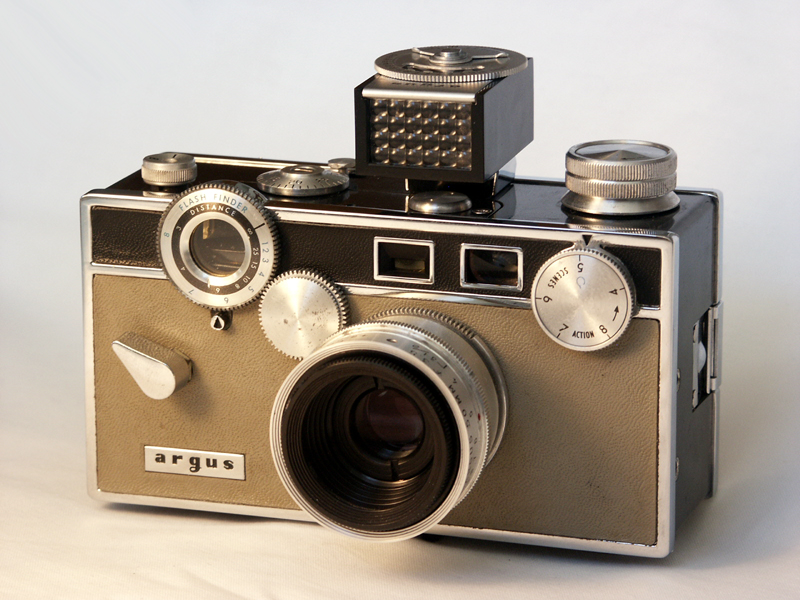
Argus C3 Matchmatic

The series began in 1938 with the Argus C, equipped with a rangefinder which was not coupled to the lens. Focusing a C is a two step process, first finding the distance using the built-in rangefinder, then focusing the lens by rotating it until a scale on the side matches the distance given by the rangefinder. Very early production C cameras had high and low range shutter speeds marked on the speed dial, with a separate switch to select the desired speed range. The high/low speed selector was soon deleted from production, and speeds controlled by the rotary dial with 10 marked speeds.

The C was replaced within just a few months by the C2, with a geared coupling between the rangefinder and the lens, greatly accelerating focusing and making the camera much more convenient to use. Finally, in 1939 the C3 was introduced, with electrical plugs on the cameras left side for a battery-powered flash, synchronized to the shutter.

The basic C3 model underwent only minor revisions from its introduction until it was discontinued in 1966. For instance, the number of shutter speeds was lowered from ten to seven to five, an accessory shoe was added, and the exposure reminder dial on the back of the camera was removed. There was a variant featuring color-coded exposure controls known as the Colormatic. A second-generation C3 with an improved lens and more comfortable controls, the Standard C3, came out in 1958, though it was otherwise nearly identical to its predecessor.

Three variants were offered in addition to the basic C3: the Matchmatic, Golden Shield, and C33. The first two, produced from 1958 to 1966, were sold with a selenium light meter attachment but were otherwise essentially identical to the Standard C3. Both models also featured distinctive finishes: two-tone tan and black leatherette on the Matchmatic and metallized PET film coating on the Golden Shield. The C33, sold from 1959 to 1960, was a significant departure from the basic model though it still featured the classic "brick" shape. It offered numerous improvements over the older model including an integrated rangefinder and coupled light meter.

== Notable users ==
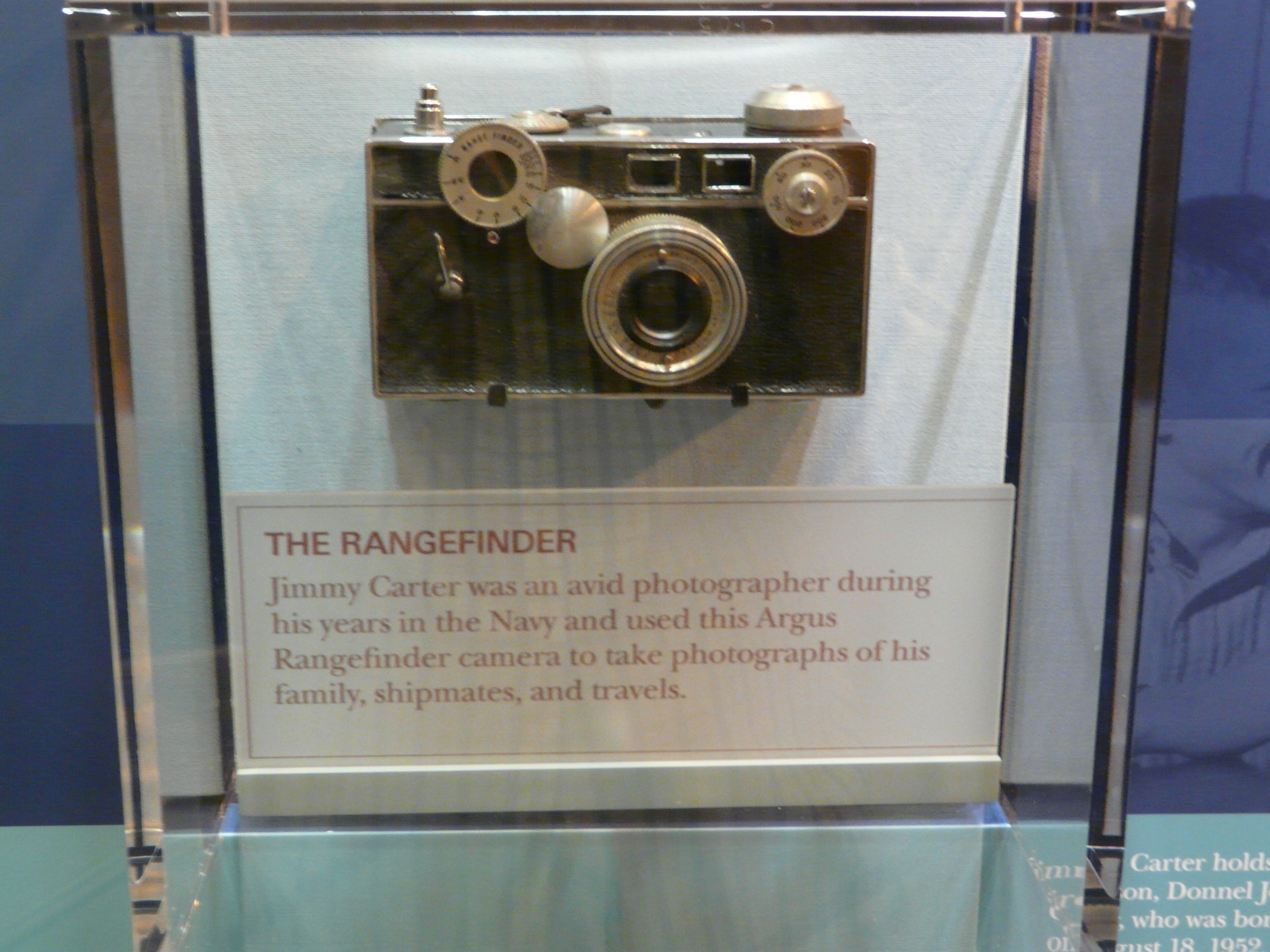
Jimmy Carter's C3

World War II soldier and photojournalist Tony Vaccaro took most of his images with an Argus C3, even developing the images in soldiers' helmets. Duane Michals used a C3 to make double exposures. Helen K. Garber's father, Alex Kolikow, taught her how to shoot with his Argus C3. A C3 used by U.S. President Jimmy Carter is on display at the Jimmy Carter Library and Museum in Atlanta.

== In popular culture ==
The C3 has frequently appeared in film. It was the camera used by Spy Magazine photographer Elizabeth Imbrie (Ruth Hussey) in The Philadelphia Story (1940); by Claire Dodd in the 1941 Abbott and Costello film In The Navy ; by Max Showalter in the 1953 film Niagara ; and by Polly Perkins (Gwyneth Paltrow) in Sky Captain and the World of Tomorrow (2004).

A C3 appears prominently in the 1991 music video "Into The Great Wide Open" by Tom Petty and the Heartbreakers. A C3 Matchmatic was used by Colin Creevey in the 2002 film Harry Potter and the Chamber of Secrets. A C3 is the first camera used by Therese (Rooney Mara) in the 2015 film Carol. It also appears in the fifth episode of the second season of The Terror: Infamy, and the 2018 war horror film Overlord. It appears as a craftable weapon in the online action role-playing game Fallout 76 under the name "ProSnap Deluxe camera".
