= George J. Burke =

American judge (1886–1950)

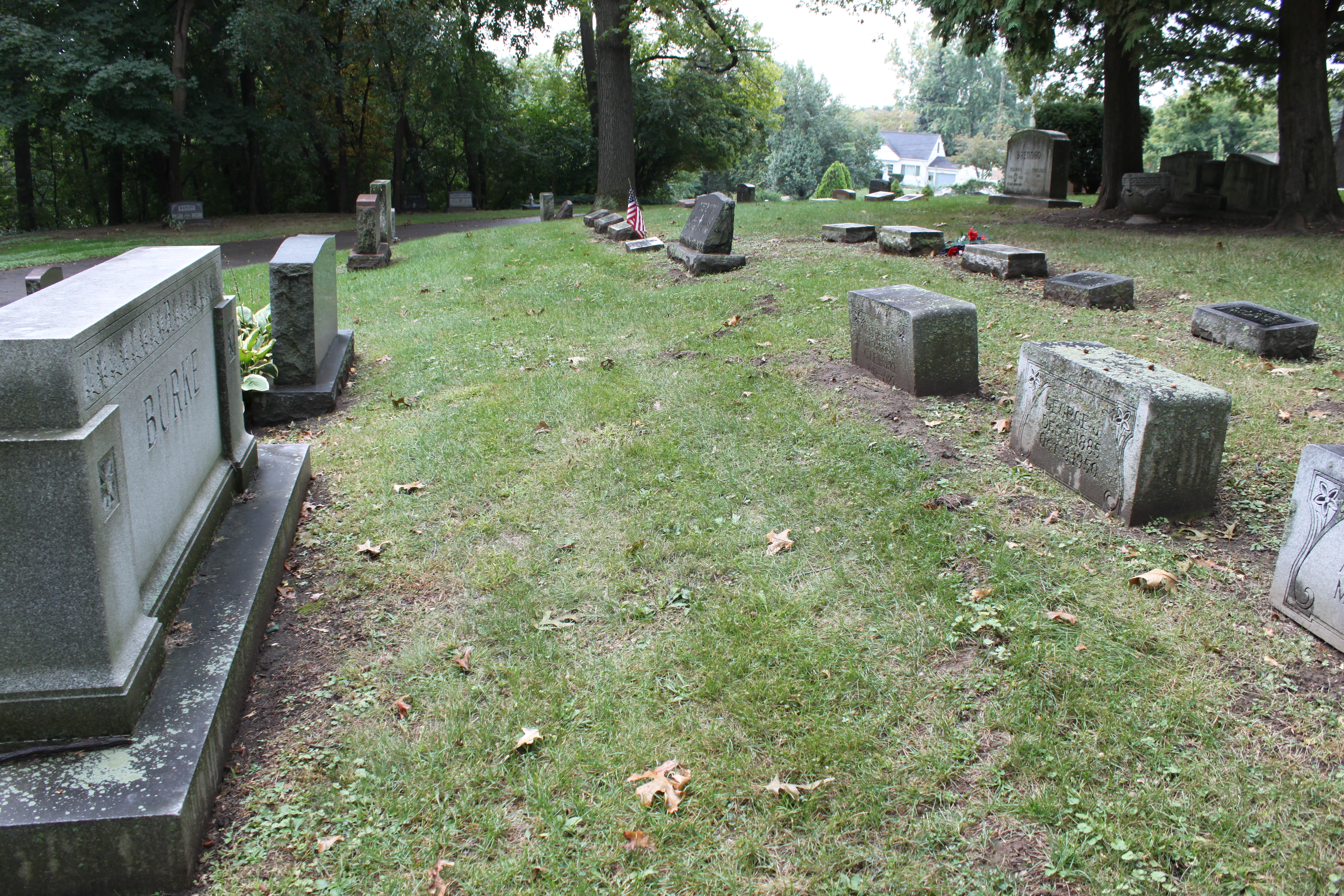
Burke grave

George James Burke, Sr. (1886 – October 3, 1950) was one of the judges during the Nuremberg Trials.

Burke was born in Ann Arbor, Michigan. He was the prosecuting attorney of Washtenaw County, Michigan from 1911 to 1914. He is interred at St. Thomas Cemetery in Ann Arbor.
