= Germania Building Complex =

- U.S. National Register of Historic Places
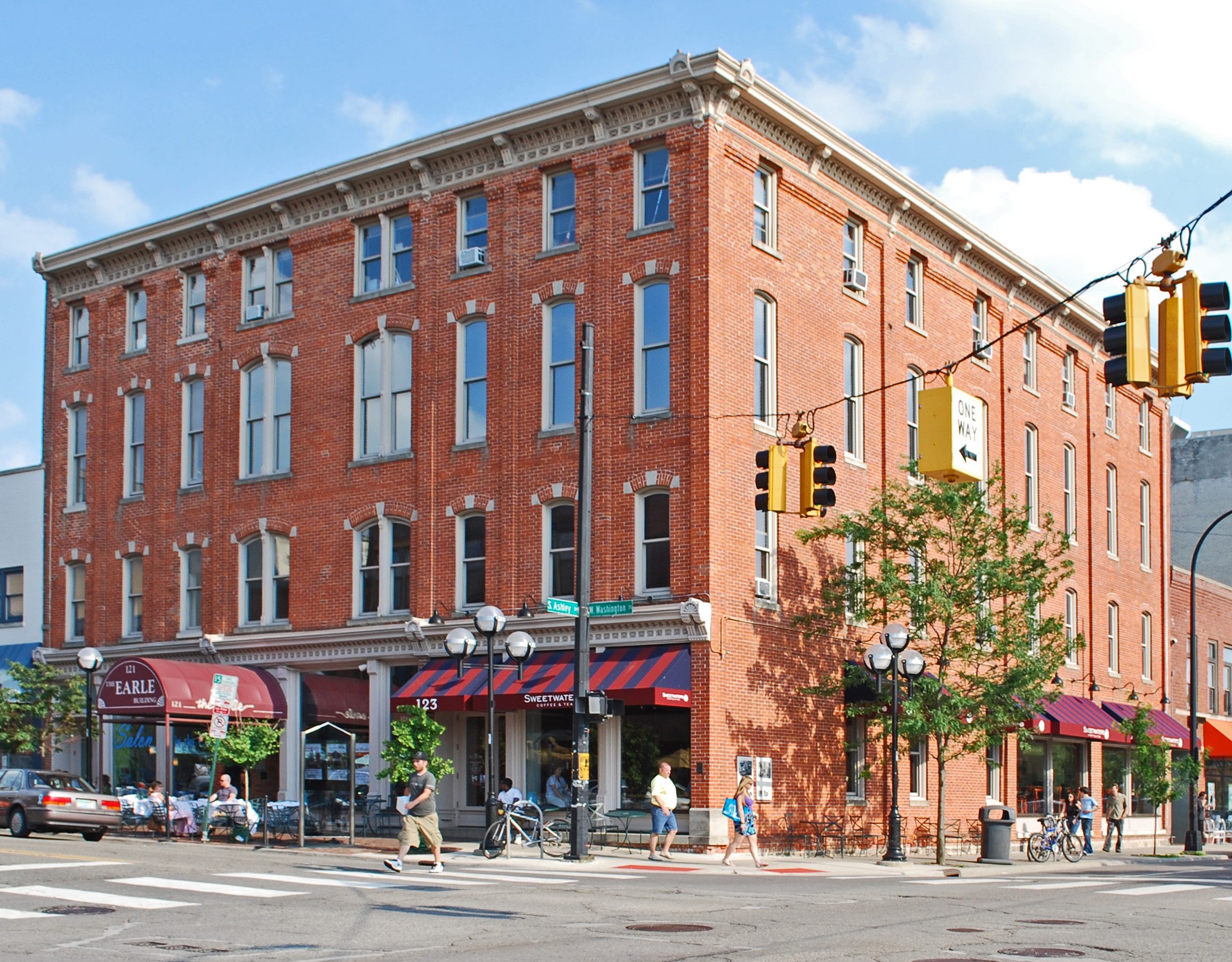
- Interactive map
- Location: 119-123 W. Washington St. and 209-211 Ashley St., Ann Arbor, Michigan
- Coordinates: 42°16′49″N 83°44′58″W
- Area: less than one acre
- Built: 1885
- Architect: George W. Schwab
- Architectural style: Late Victorian
- NRHP reference No.: 83000893
- Added to NRHP: March 10, 1983

The Germania Building Complex consists of two adjacent related buildings located at 119-123 West Washington Street and 209-211 Ashley Street in Ann Arbor, Michigan. The buildings were listed on the National Register of Historic Places in 1983.

== History ==
Michael Staebler was born In 1843 in Lodi Township, near Ann Arbor, to German immigrants who had settled in the area in 1831. By 1880, Staebler owned a large farm as well as a sawmill, elder press, flax-seed press, and a threshing machine. In 1885, Staebler had the Germania Building constructed to house his coal and farm implement business and a hotel owned by William L. Frank, known as the Germania House. The hotel catered to both the travelling public and to the local German community, hosting meetings of Ann Arbor's local German clubs. In 1895, Staebler became proprietor of the hotel as well, renaming it the American House and expanding the building by adding a fourth floor. Michael Staebler brought his sons, Robert E. and Albert H. Staebler, into the business.

A third son, Edward, worked at the Staebler's farm implement shop. He convinced his father to sell first motorcycles and then, in 1901, Toledo Steam cars, making Staebler & Sons the first automobile dealer in Ann Arbor. By 1906 the firm was also selling REOs, Wintons, Maxwell-Briscoes, Cadillacs, Dorts, Franklins, and Oaklands. The building was remodeled into a showroom, and a wood-frame garage behind the hotel was used for repairs. In 1918 the previous garage was replaced with a new two-story structure. With the onset of Prohibition, the hotel's saloon was closed and converted into an auto parts stor. In 1927, the dining room was closed and converted into a showroom.

The Staeblers continued to run the hotel until Albert Staebler's retirement in 1932. Edward Staebler and his brother Walter ran the automobile dealership until 1952, after which the garage was remodeled into commercial space. The hotel changed its name to the Griswold in 1932 and the Earle in 1954, and continued to operate until 1971. The Staebler family continued to own the building until the early 1970s. The building underwent extensive rehabilitation in 1975.

== Description ==
The Germania Building Complex consists of two adjacent, physically connected buildings constructed for the Staebler family: the 1885 Germania Building and the 1918 Staebler & Sons garage. The Germania Building stands at the corner of West Washington and South Ashley streets and faces north; the garage is located directly behind the building and is physically attached.

The Germania Building is a square, stone-trimmed, red-orange brick, Late Victorian block measuring sixty-six by eighty feet in size standing on a fieldstone foundation. The original building was three stories high; a fourth story was added in 1895. The facade is divided into three structural bays that hold individual storefronts. It has a shallow hip roof and a sheet metal cornice extending across the facade. The upper levels contain wooden double-hung sash windows on stone sills. The openings on the second and third floor are round-headed; the openings on the fourth are square-headed. The first-floor storefronts all retain the original proportions, and some of the original trim, although renovations over time have altered the look of all of them.

The former Staebler & Sons garage building Is attached to the rear of the Germania Building. It is a two-story utilitarian structure of red brick on a concrete foundation. The first-floor windows are wood frame units with leaded-glass transoms. The second story windows are wooden double-hung units with fixed-glass transoms and limestone sills.
