= International Radio Corporation =

American radio receiver manufacturing company

- Industry: Manufacturing
- Founded: 1931 in Ann Arbor, Michigan, United States
- Founder: Charles Albert Verschoor
- Successor: Argus, Inc.
- Headquarters: Ann Arbor, Michigan, United States
- Brands: Kadette
- Operating income: $2,700,000 (1937)
- Number of employees: 150 (1936)

The International Radio Corporation (IRC) was an American radio receiver manufacturing company based in Ann Arbor, Michigan. It was established in 1931 by Charles Albert Verschoor with financial backing from Ann Arbor mayor William E. Brown, Jr., and a group of local business leaders. IRC manufactured numerous different radios, many bearing the Kadette name, including the first mass-produced AC/DC radio, the first pocket radio, and the first clock radio. Due to the seasonal nature of radio sales, the company attempted to diversify its offerings with a product that would sell well during the summer, eventually settling on a camera that would become the Argus. In 1939, IRC sold its radio-manufacturing business to its former General Sales Manager, W. Keene Jackson, although his new Kadette Radio Corporation only survived for a year before it went defunct. After World War II, International Industries and its International Research division became wholly owned subsidiaries of Argus, Inc., after which point the International name ceased to exist.

== History ==
=== Establishment ===
The International Radio Corporation was founded in 1931 in Ann Arbor, Michigan, the creation of Charles Albert Verschoor, who had begun making radios in the 1920s. Described as a "colorful old-time promoter" in a January 1945 Fortune magazine article and as a "go-getting inventor" by Mary Hunt, Verschoor had previous experience in automobile manufacturing as well. The company was initially financed with $10,000 raised by Ann Arbor mayor William E. Brown, Jr., and a group of local business leaders who desired to create a new local company with substantial potential for growth and job creation during the Great Depression. It was based out of a former furniture factory located at 405 Fourth Street on Ann Arbor's west side.

=== Early products and profitability ===
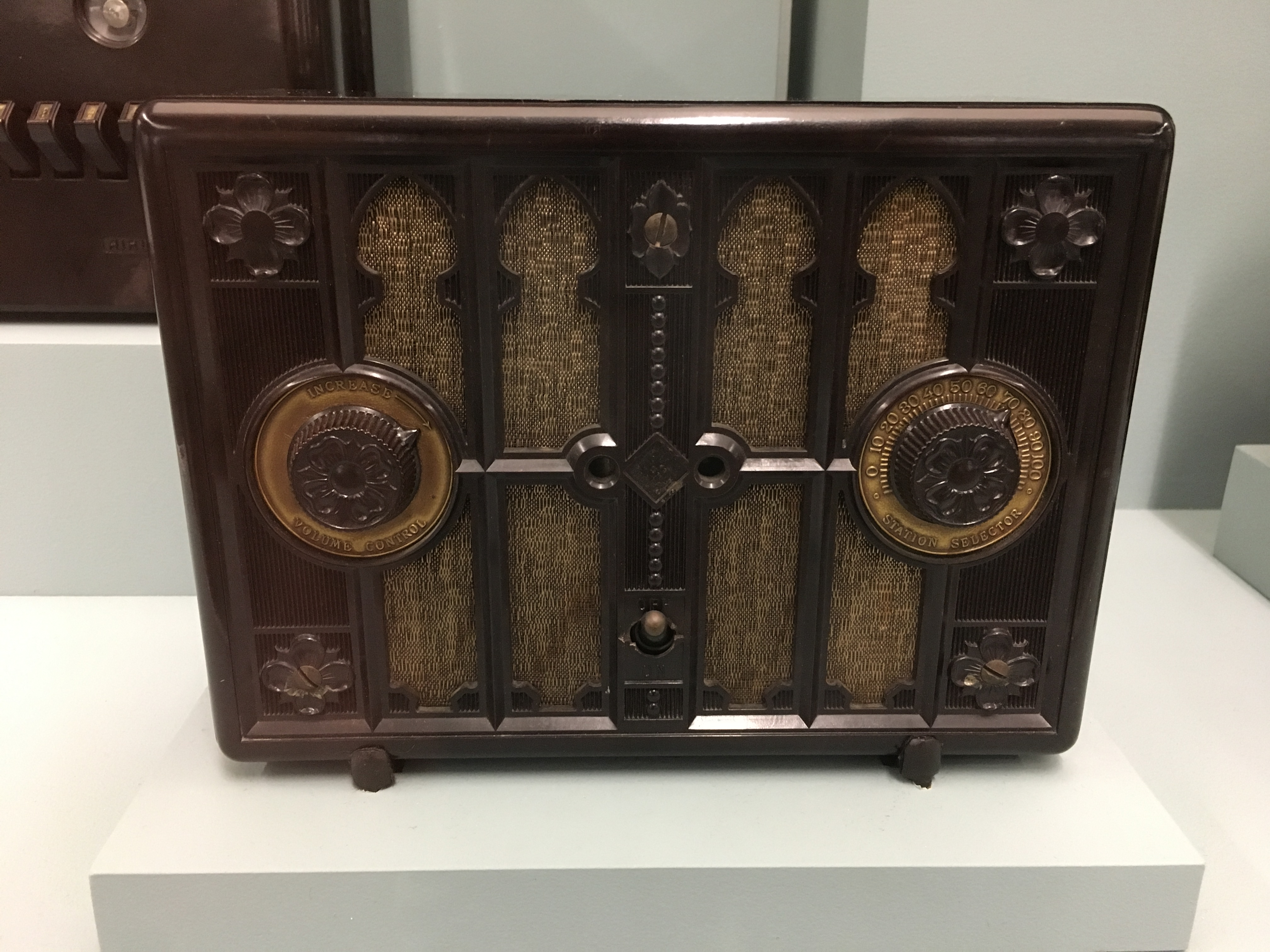
Kadette Model H (1932), made of Bakelite

IRC debuted its first radio, the International Duo, on August 7, 1931; it was named for its ability to receive both local longwave and European shortwave radio signals. It measured 14 in (36 cm) by 16 in (41 cm) by 9 in (23 cm), at a time when most table radios measured 20 in (51 cm) in length without their separate speaker.

Shortly thereafter, (Note: The year of the Kadette's debut is a matter of some disagreement: it has been stated, respectively, as 1931 by Mahon, 1932 by Mayer, and 1933 by Hunt.) IRC introduced the Kadette, the first mass-produced AC/DC radio; it was a four-tube, 6-pound (2.7 kg) radio small enough to be easily portable that featured an innovative plastic cabinet. This cabinet material, called Bakelite, was fairly cheap to produce and helped IRC to turn a substantial profit on its radio sales. Manufactured by the Chicago Molded Products Company, the Kadette's plastic cabinet was the first to be used on a radio, although its Gothic styling gave it a fairly traditional appearance. The radio also boasted an innovative new circuit design, while its ability to operate on either alternating (AC) or direct current (DC) allowed it to operate without a power transformer, resulting in it being cheaper, smaller, and lighter than its competitors; it also allowed the Kadette to be plugged into typical household wall sockets. Furthermore, IRC released a kit that instructed customers how to modify their Kadettes for battery-powered mobile applications, such as in railroad cars and automobiles; in the words of Robert E. Mayer, this kit "effectively started the car radio market".

The popularity of the Kadette led to "almost immediate profitability" for IRC, and by 1933 it was the only company in Ann Arbor that was still able to pay dividends to its shareholders. During the early 1930s, Ann Arbor was less adversely affected by the Great Depression than Detroit or most other Michigan communities, although lost orders and inability to pay dividends were common occurrences for Ann Arbor-based companies.

=== Later products and financial difficulties ===
Following after the Kadette were a variety of other models, many of which were innovative in their own right: the Kadette Jr., the world's first pocket radio; the Kadette Jewel, the original Kadette's successor that was available in five different color combinations; the Kadette Classic, built with three different types of plastic; and the Kadette Clockette, which resembled a small mantel clock and was available in four different wooden case styles. IRC also introduced a number of related accessories, including the Tunemaster, a portable radio remote control, and the Kadette Autime, the first mass-produced clock radio.

In 1937, as its sales had climbed to $2,700,000, IRC introduced a 10-tube Kadette radio for $19.95, a price comparable with many four- and five-tube sets when its 10-tube competitors cost $100 or more. With three ballast tubes, these 10-tube radios were met with largely negative reviews; in the words of Alan Voorhees, they were "$20 sets with extra ballast tubes thrown in". They were also reminiscent of 10-tube radios that Verschoor had built between 1925 and 1930 under the "Arborphone" name, which had only five functioning tubes alongside five superfluous ones intended simply to impress prospective customers.

Furthermore, when radio dealers sold IRC's 10-tube Kadettes, they achieved profit margins of 15% at most, far less than what they could earn selling premium models made by competitors. After the company began requiring its dealers to stock its slower selling units in order to also have access to its 10-tube Kadettes, some dealers resorted to giving unauthorized discounts to move the less attractive models, resulting in their total profit margins on the whole Kadette line falling to as low as 5% in some cases. As their profit margins fell, many dealers dropped Kadettes from their catalogs altogether; while IRC made efforts to reverse this trend, in many cases irreparable damage had already been done.

=== Diversification ===
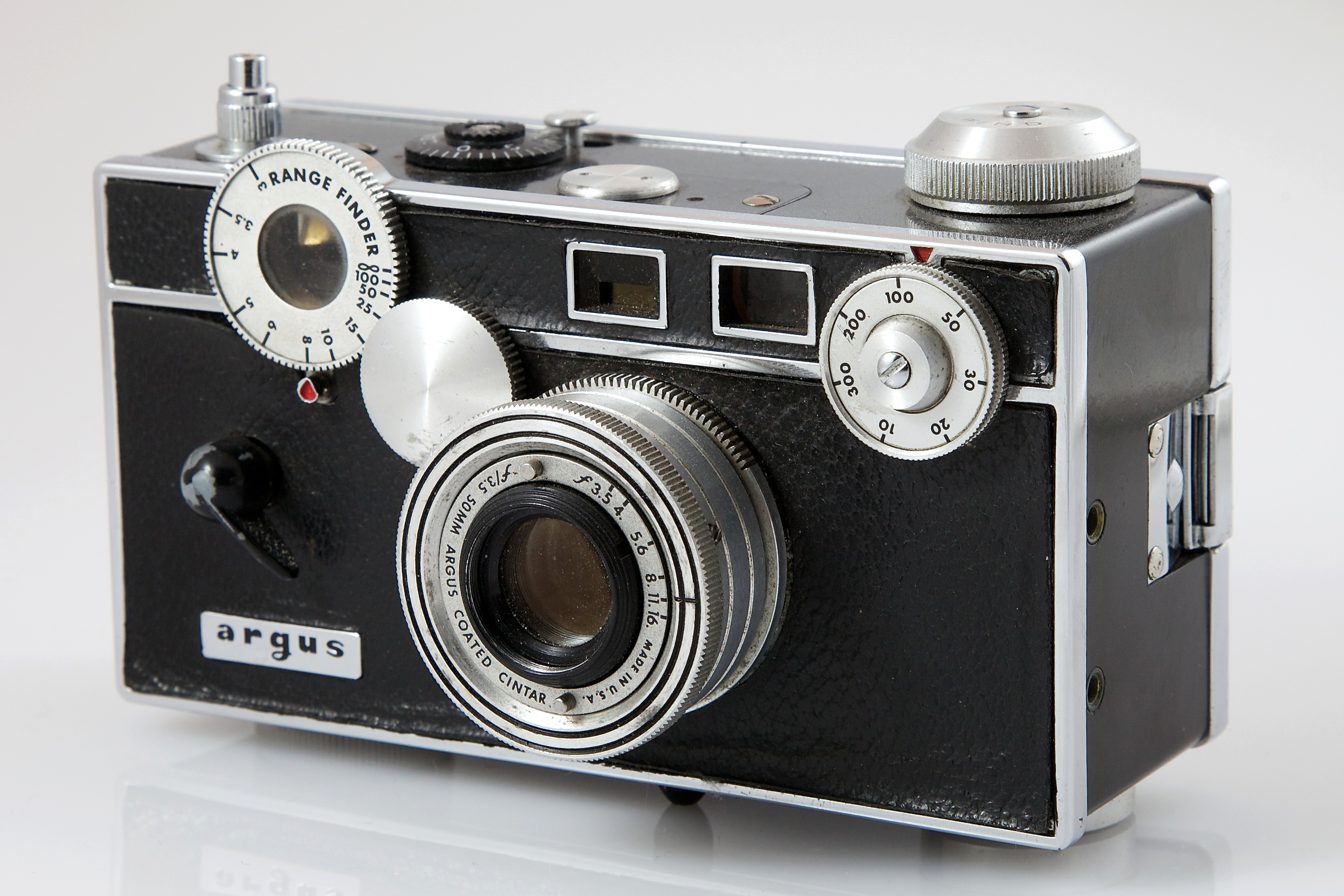
An Argus C3, produced by Argus between 1939 and 1966

While IRC's radio business was initially successful, it was generally seasonal in nature; due to better reception in winter as well as general patterns of behavior before the widespread adoption of air conditioning, sales of radios were much higher during the winter months than during the summer. This prompted Verschoor to explore possibilities for expanding the company's product line in order to reduce the slack periods caused by the seasonal variation in its radio sales. Looking for a product that could be produced relatively cheaply and that would also sell well during the summer months, he decided upon an inexpensive Leica-inspired camera that would ultimately become the Argus, which launched to nearly instant success in 1936. That same year, when IRC had 150 employees, it sold its Kadette AC/DC patents to RCA.

=== Final years ===
In 1938, Verschoor departed from IRC after being pressured to leave. By the early 1940s the company was being run by a "modern management team".

In 1939, International Industries sold its radio-manufacturing business to the company's former General Sales Manager, W. Keene Jackson. After renaming it the Kadette Radio Corporation, Jackson expressed his desire to expand its product line by adding television sets, vowing that the new company would "employ every technical resource to bring the price of efficient television reception to the point where every American home can enjoy this new art as quickly as possible." However, Jackson's company suffered from the same problems that IRC had, and just a year after its establishment it was already out of business.

While its radio business had faltered, International Industries had found success in the camera and optical equipment fields with its Argus line; by 1942, Argus, Inc.'s sales had climbed to $4,800,000, and during World War II the company employed 1,200 people. After the war, International Industries and its International Research division became wholly owned subsidiaries of Argus, Inc., and shortly thereafter the International name ceased to exist.
