= Helen K. Garber =

American photographer (born 1954)

Helen K. Garber (born 1954) is an American photographer known mostly for her black-and-white urban landscapes of cities including Los Angeles, San Francisco, New York City, Paris, Amsterdam and Venice. Her images are in the permanent collection of the Brooklyn Museum, Museum of the City of New York, Portland Art Museum, Yale University and the George Eastman House.

== Works ==
=== Photography ===
- Griffith Park Observatory 1997
- Radio Tower, Empire State 1997
- World Trade Center from Empire State 1997
- Bike Path Fog 2001
- Speedway Alley 2001
- LAX 2002
- Santa Monica Pier Fog 1 2002
- Santa Monica Pier Fog 2 2002
- Chinatown Art Opening 2003
- Paris Walk Street 2003
- Los Angeles Panoramic 2 2005
- Disney Hall and Music Center from US Bank Tower 2005
- A Night View of Los Angeles 2006
- A Night View Collaboration 2007–2010
- GroupLA 2008, An Intimate View of Los Angeles 2009
- GroupSC 2009, An Intimate View of Southern CA 2010

=== Books ===
- Wendy Wilkinson; Cynthia Peck (1997). Parents at Last - The New Pathways to Parenthood. Helen K. Garber (illustrator). Clarkson N. Potter. ISBN 978-0-609-60290-4.
- Helen K. Garber (2005). Venice Beach, California Carnivale. Xlibris Books. ISBN 978-1-4134-9108-1.
- Craig Krull; Jane Brown (2005). Marla Hamburg Kennedy; Ben Stiller; David Ulin (eds.). Looking at Los Angeles. Helen K. Garber, Julius Shulman, Elliot Erwitt, Diane Arbus, David Hockney, Ralph Gibson (photographers). Metropolis Books. ISBN 978-1-933045-04-7.

=== Films ===
- Shirley Kaufer, Artist 1990
- L.A. Noir 2005
- "Urban Noir - LA/NY" 2009
