= Nickels Arcade =

- U.S. National Register of Historic Places
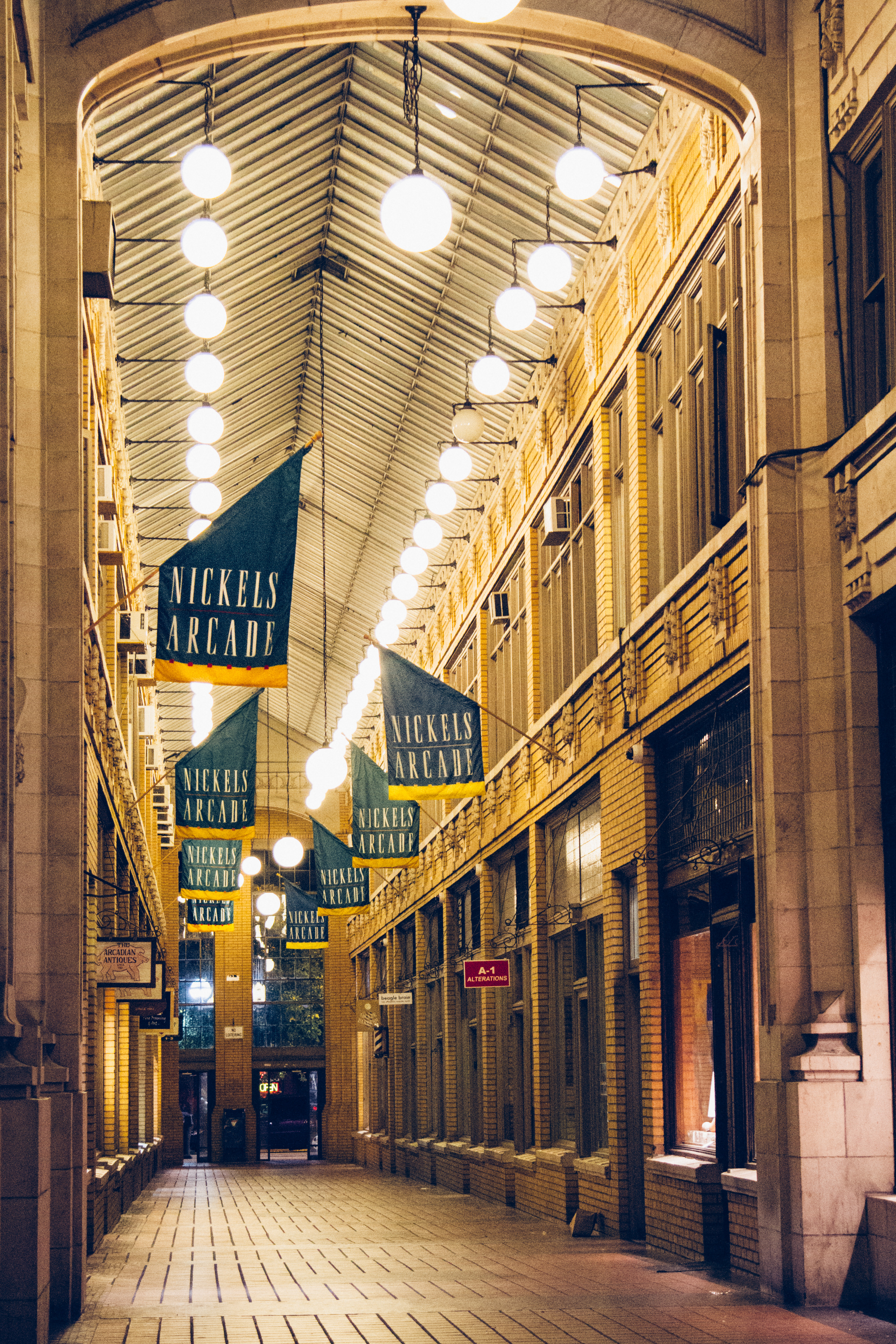
- Interactive map
- Location: 326-330 S. State St., Ann Arbor, Michigan
- Coordinates: 42°16′42″N 83°44′29″W
- Area: less than one acre
- Built: 1915
- Built by: A.R. Cole & Co.
- Architect: Herman Pipp
- NRHP reference No.: 87001180
- Added to NRHP: July 9, 1987

Nickels Arcade is a commercial building located at 326-330 South State Street in Ann Arbor, Michigan. It was listed on the National Register of Historic Places in 1987. The building is notable as perhaps the only remaining example in Michigan of a free-standing commercial arcade building of a type that was popularized by the Cleveland Arcade.

== History ==
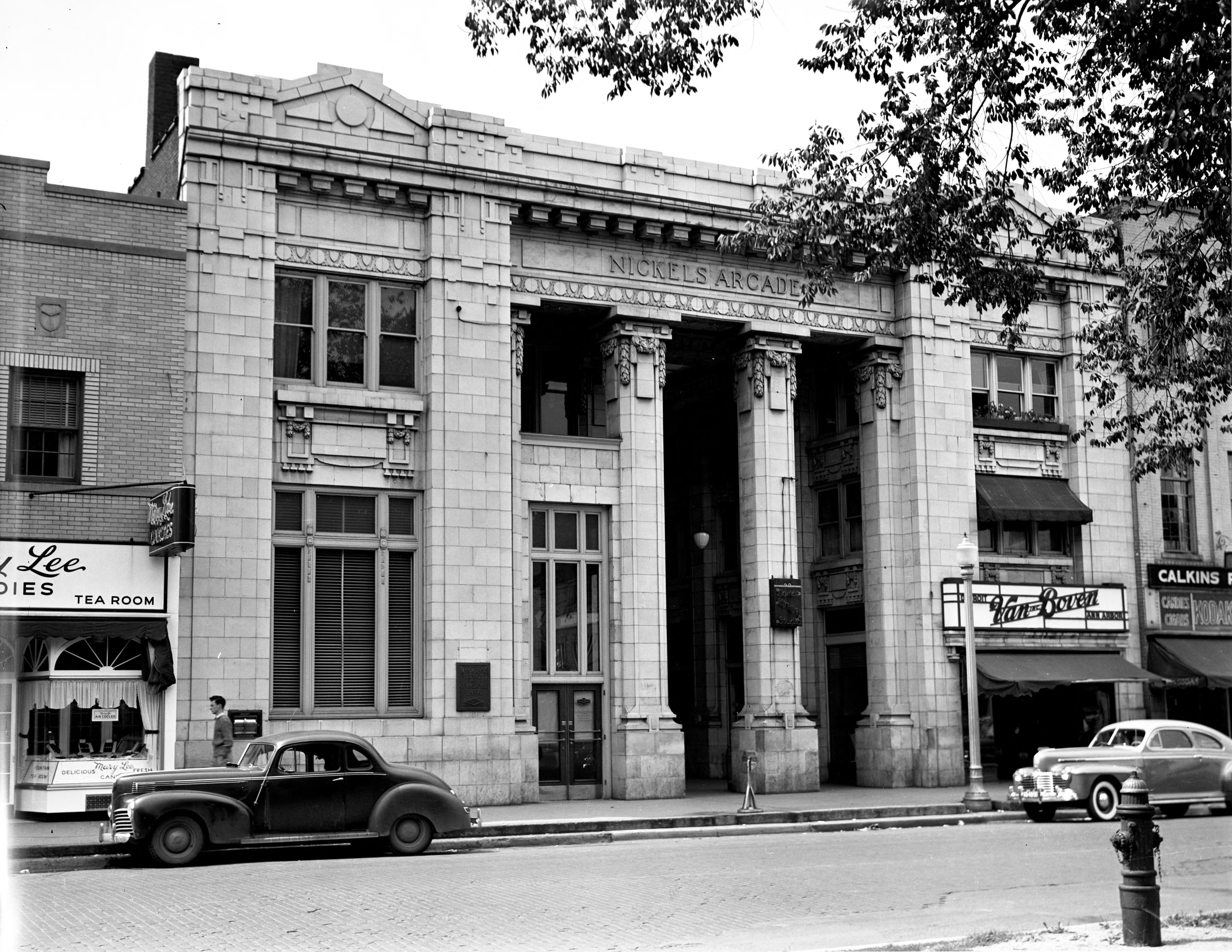
State Street facade of the arcade, c. 1942

John H. Nickels owned and operated a meat market at this location on State Street. His grandson Tom E. Nickels inherited a portion of the property, and bought other portions of the property from his brothers and sister. Nickels hired local architect Hermann Pipp to design this building. Construction by A.R. Cole & Co. began in 1915. The first tenant, the Farmers and Mechanics bank, moved in that year. The entire building, however, was not completed until 1918, due in part to delays caused by the onset of World War I. Nickels owned the Arcade until his death in 1932, when he passed it on to his children, James and Nora.

In July 2015, a University of Michigan student from Saugatuck fell through the glass roof of the arcade to his death.

== Description ==
Nickels Arcade is a 261-foot-long gallery linking State Street on one side to Maynard Street on the other. The principal facade faces onto State Street, and consists of a three-story, three-bay open portico flanked with store/office blocks. The facade is clad with a buff-colored decorative architectural terra cotta. The Maynard Street facade is similar to the State Street facade in design, but is clad primarily with yellow brick, with additional ornamental detailing of terra cotta. The gallery running between the facades is covered with a gable skylight of metal-framed wire-glass panels.

On each side of the gallery are ground-level shops which face onto the roofed passage. These shops are essentially two stories in height, some with a mezzanine level. Upper-story office windows above the commercial spaces also face onto the gallery. The arcade is floored with blocks of square red tile in black borders. The arcade is divided into three sections: the section nearest State Street continues the terra cotta cladding and detailing of the State Street facade. This section is separated from the next by a segmental archway; a similar archway near the other end separates the center section from an entrance vestibule.
