= Culture of Ann Arbor, Michigan =

Aspect of community

The culture of Ann Arbor, Michigan includes various attractions and events, many of which are connected with the University of Michigan.

== University of Michigan attractions ==
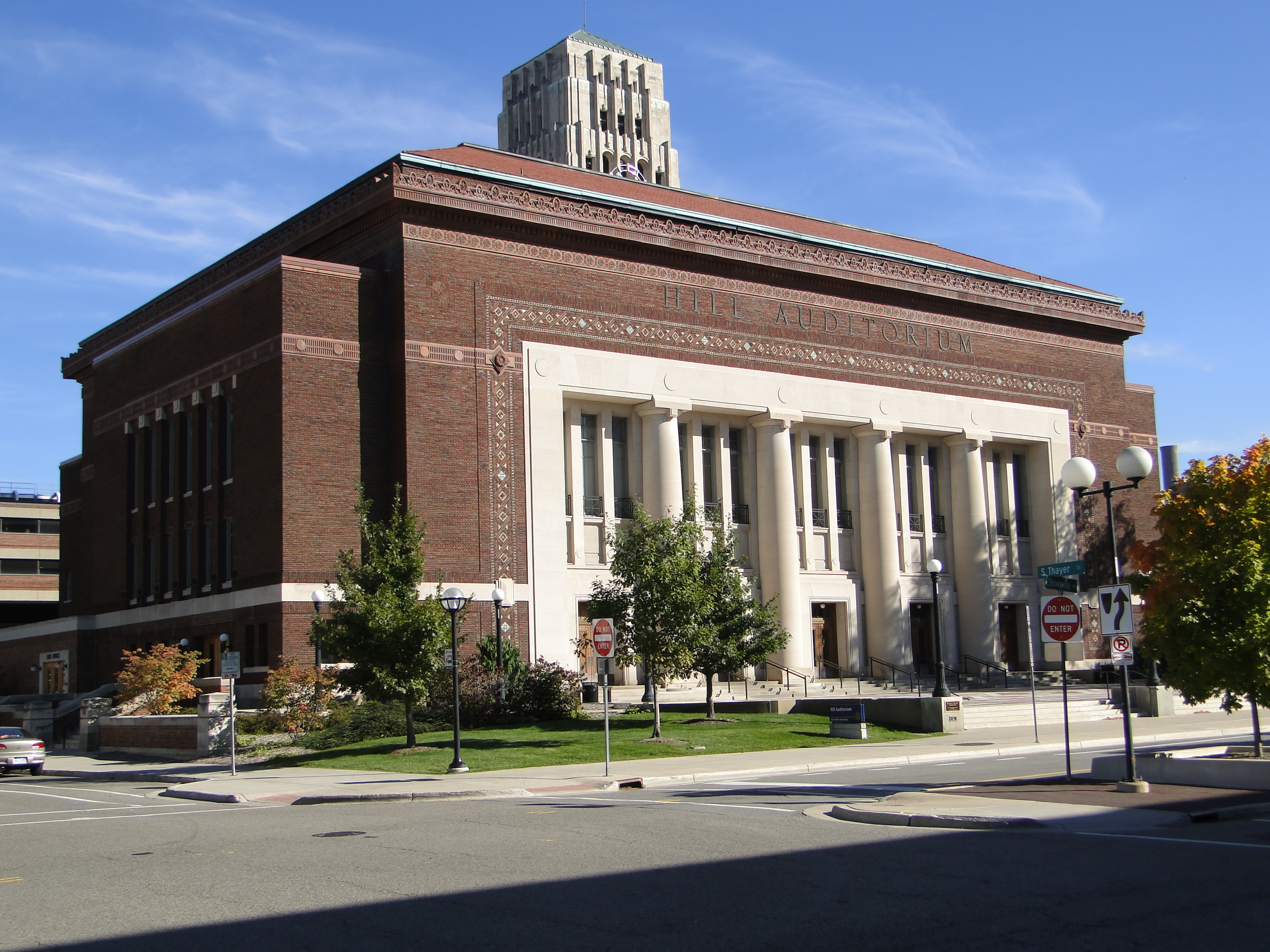
Hill Auditorium, University of Michigan

Many performing arts groups and facilities are located on the University of Michigan campus, including Hill Auditorium, the Lydia Mendelssohn Theater, and the Power Center for the Performing Arts.

The University Musical Society (UMS) presents approximately 60 to 75 performances and over 100 free educational activities each season. One of the oldest performing arts presenters in the country, UMS is affiliated with the University of Michigan and housed on the UM campus. However, UMS is a separate not-for-profit organization that supports itself from ticket sales, grants, contributions, and endowment income.

The University of Michigan Gilbert and Sullivan Society, affiliated with the university's School of Music, Theatre, and Dance, has put on two fully staged performances of a Gilbert and Sullivan Savoy opera every year since 1947, once in fall semester and the other in winter semester. The society is student-run. Performances take place at the Lydia Mendelssohn Theater.

== Institutions and venues ==
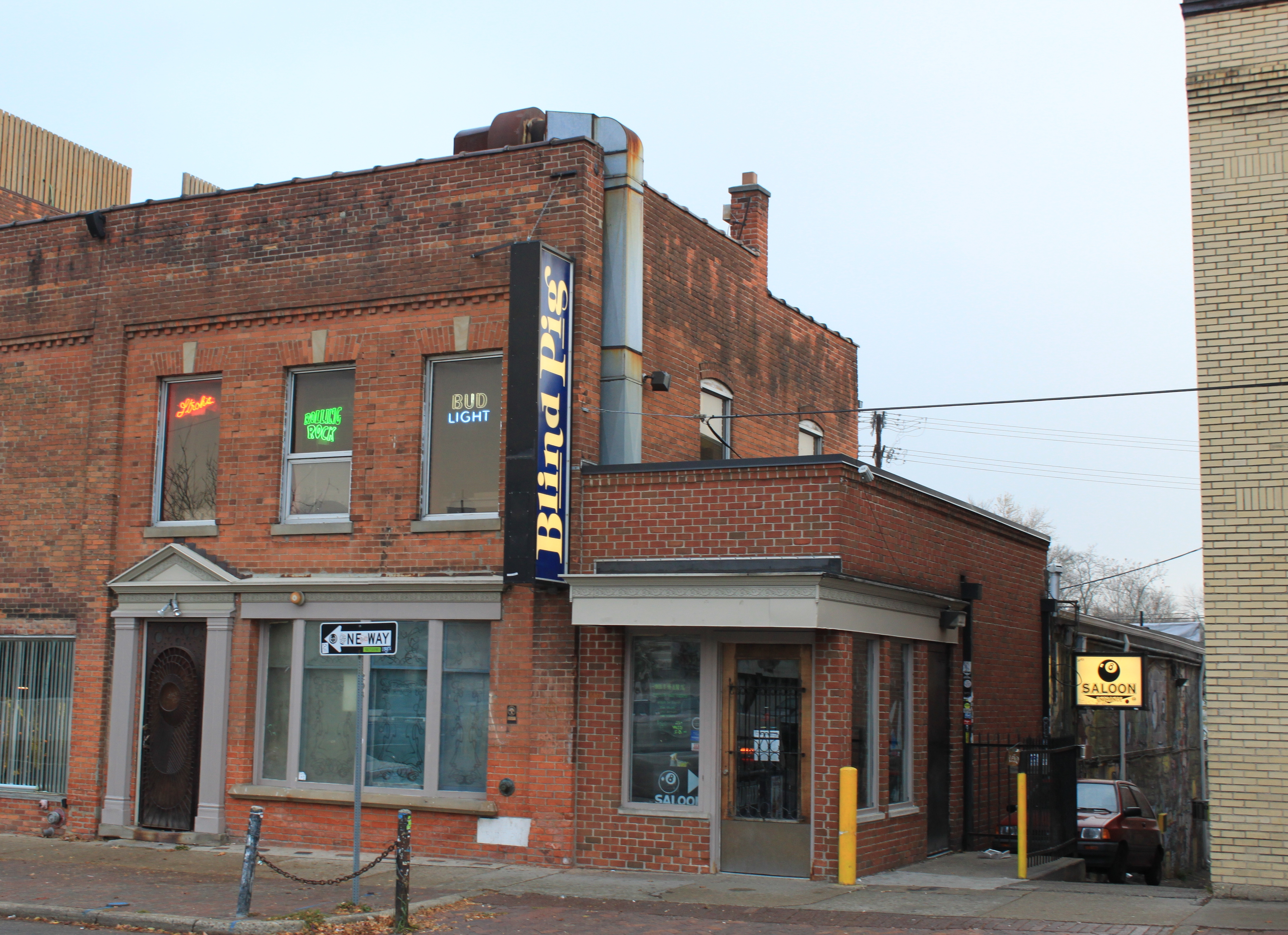
The Blind Pig, Ann Arbor, Michigan

Ann Arbor has a number of performing-arts institutions that are not affiliated with the University of Michigan. They include the Ann Arbor Civic Theatre (a nonprofit community theater group), Ann Arbor Symphony Orchestra, and Arbor Opera Theater. Once-active groups included the Ann Arbor Ballet Theater, Ann Arbor Civic Ballet (the first chartered ballet company in Michigan when it was founded in 1954), and Performance Network Theatre.

Theaters in the city include:

- Michigan Theater - A live-performance venue and movie house. It hosts live performances, independent films, and classic movies while also serving as home to the Ann Arbor Symphony Orchestra
- State Theatre - Independent movie theater located on State Street.

Ann Arbor also has a number of concert halls and nightclubs serving up jazz and other live music:

- Ann Arbor Comedy Showcase
- The Ark - Ann Arbor's folk and acoustic music venue.
- The Blind Pig - A small venue for rock, hip hop, and electronic music. It is known for early performances by Dave Matthews Band, Verve Pipe, and Nirvana, among others.
- Kerrytown Concert House

There are several religious sites in Ann Arbor, including:

- St. Patrick's Parish Complex

== Sites of interest ==
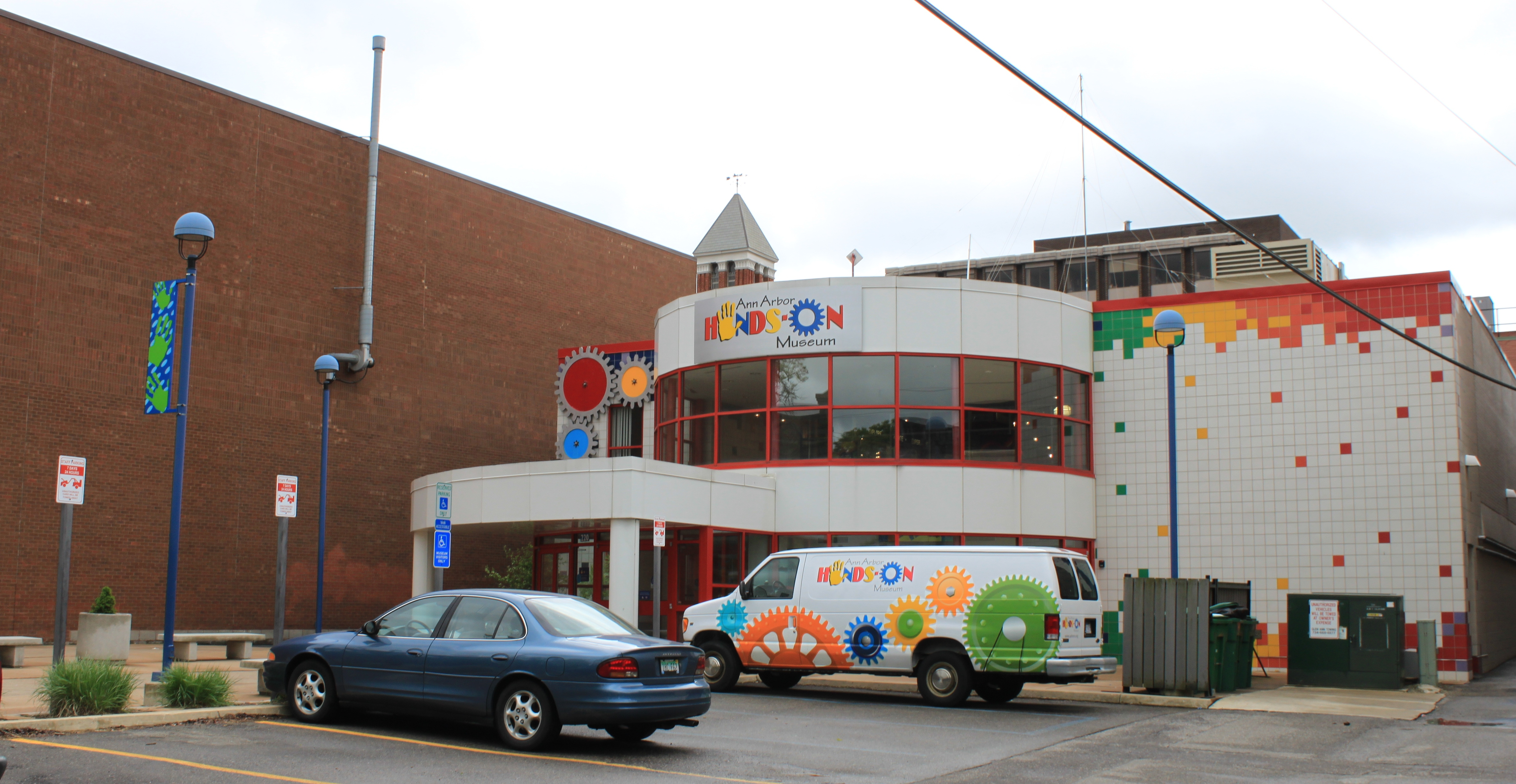
Ann Arbor Hands-On Museum

The Ann Arbor Hands-On Museum, located in a renovated and expanded historic downtown fire station, contains more than 250 interactive exhibits featuring science and technology. Artrain, located on North Main Street, is a traveling art museum located on a train.

A number of other art galleries exist in the city, notably in the downtown area and around the University of Michigan campus, notably the University of Michigan Museum of Art, which has a variety of outdoor sculptures, including Orion and Daedalus.

A mural located on the corner of Liberty Street and State Street downtown, colloquially referred to as The Bookstore Mural, is one of the city's most well-known pieces of public art.

Several buildings throughout the downtown area, like Sweetwaters Coffee and Tea and The Ark, showcase pieces of independent installation art in the form of small "fairy doors". Maps of their locations can be found at Sweetwaters or the Chamber of Commerce.

== Events ==
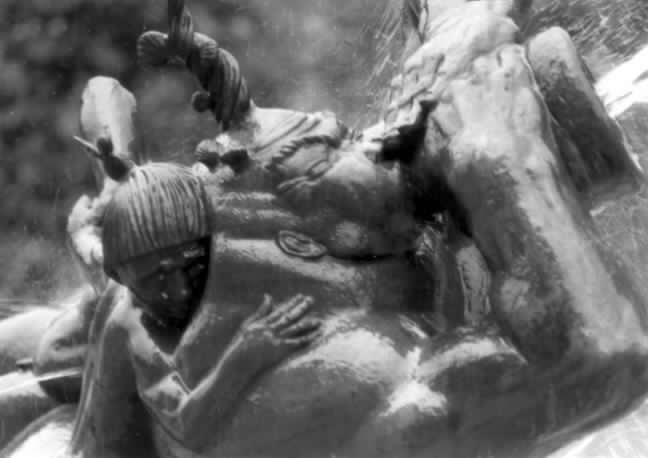
Sunday Morning by Carl Milles in Ann Arbor

=== Spring ===
- Ann Arbor Film Festival - The oldest continually operated annual experimental film festival in North America, this event attracts entries from moving image artists worldwide and screens more than 100 films before audiences at the Michigan Theater during six days in March.
- Hash Bash - First Saturday of April. The event is a collection of speeches, live music, street vending, and the occasional civil disobedience centered on the goal of revising federal, state, and local marijuana laws. The first Hash Bash was held in 1971 to protest the 10-year prison sentence given to cultural activist John Sinclair for possession of two marijuana joints.
- Naked Mile - An infamous event where students would run naked through the streets once a year at the end of the University of Michigan winter semester in mid-April. The last "Naked Mile" was in 2004 after the university ended the tradition through arrests and threats to students who ran. Participation in the event also reportedly suffered as it attracted the attention of internet pornography operations.

=== Summer ===
- Shakespeare in the Arb presents one play each June. Sixteen performances, four a week, take place in Nichols Arboretum, a large natural park near downtown. The plays are performed in the open, moving from site to site, and subject to the weather, other park visitors, and the occasional low flying helicopter. They all begin fours hours before sunset, at 6:30 p.m. local time (EDT). Each performance takes about 2.5 hours. The production travels from spot to spot within the arboretum to create the different scenes. "As one critic commented, 'The actors used the vastness of its Arb[oretum] stage to full advantage, making entrances from behind trees, appearing over rises and vanishing into the woods.'"
- Summer Festival - A three-and-a-half-week event typically held from mid-June through early July at the Power Center and atop the adjacent parking structure (host to the free "Top of the Park" events). Each night offers internationally known entertainers inside the Power Center, Mendelssohn Theatre or Hill Auditorium, while Top of the Park showcases local, regional, and occasionally national talent starting at 7 p.m. nightly, and movies at 10 p.m. Sunday through Thursday. A variety of local food vendors offer limited menus while the non-profit festival organization offers soft drinks, beer and wine for sale to support the costs of offering free admission. Top Of The Park was moved to street level in 2006 due to construction on the parking structure. The move to Washington Street in front of Rackham Hall has proved to be a big success and has become a permanent place for Top Of The Park.
- Art Fairs - Held in the third week of July from Wednesday to Saturday. There are actually five separate juried fairs, and many other artists and retail booths anywhere they can rent space. Disgruntled townies and University students and staff and anyone generally involved in town life long ago adopted the slogan "It's not art and it's not fair" to decry the fairs' inconveniences.
- Shopping Cart Race - Held sometime late August, the race is not "official". Information is spread by word of mouth and stencil art. Participants have brought everything from decorated shopping carts to two-man bicycles that incorporate shopping cart elements into the design. The race is part of Punk Week, a series of events held annually.
- Taste of Ann Arbor - A one-day event held during the first week of June in the heart of downtown Ann Arbor. Local restaurants open concession stands to the public. Local bands, schools, and performers hold free shows and concerts. The event is sponsored by the Main Street Area Association, the Downtown Development Authority, Ann Arbor Jaycees, WEMU 89.1, and the Michigan Theater.
- Dexter-Ann Arbor Run - A running race from Dexter to downtown Ann Arbor along the Huron River.

=== Fall ===
- Blues and Jazz Festival - Held in mid-September at Gallup Park, the festival showcases blues and jazz musicians from around the nation. The event was first organized in 1972 by counterculture impresario John Sinclair, suspended from the mid-1970s through the 1980s, and held again in the 1990s. The 2007 Festival was canceled and the 2008 Festival is scheduled for September.
- EdgeFest - Multi-venue festival of avant-garde and progressive jazz, held each autumn since 1997.

=== Winter ===
- Ann Arbor Folk Festival - An annual benefit concert for the Ark (Ann Arbor's folk and acoustic music venue). Held late in January, it consists of many folk musicians.

== Literary culture ==
Among U.S. cities, Ann Arbor ranks first in the number of antiquarian booksellers and books sold per capita (although the per capita calculations may not include the large student population). The Ann Arbor District Library maintains four branch outlets in addition to its main downtown building, with a fifth branch set to open in 2008. The city is also home to the Gerald R. Ford Presidential Library.

Ann Arbor is also known within the performance poetry scene. The Neutral Zone, a local teen center, is home to the Volume Youth Poetry Project which holds a competition every year to send a team of six youth poets to the national youth competition Brave New Voices. The city hosted this competition in 2001 and 2002, and has sent a team each year across the U.S.

== Films and fictional writing set in Ann Arbor ==
Ann Arbor (or its surrounding region) is also the setting (or the presumed setting) for a number of novels and short story collections.

=== Books ===
- Justin McCarthy, Dear Lady Disdain (1875)
- Karl Edwin Harriman, Ann Arbor Tales (1902)
- Lloyd Cassel Douglas, Magnificent Obsession (1929)
- Allan Seager, A Frieze of Girls: Memoirs as Fiction (1964)
- David Osborn, Open Season (1974)
- Marge Piercy, Braided Lives (1982)
- Nancy Willard, Things Invisible to See (1985)
- Susan Holtzer, Something To Kill For (1995)
- Susan Holtzer, Curly Smoke (1996)
- Jerry Prescott, Deadly Sweet in Ann Arbor (1996)
- Susan Holtzer, Bleeding Maize and Blue (1997)
- Susan Holtzer, Black Diamond: A Mystery at the University of Michigan (1998)
- Charles Baxter, Feast of Love (2000)
- Susan Holtzer, The Silly Season (2000)
- Susan Holtzer, The Wedding Game (2001)
- Jeff Kass, Takedown (2017)

=== Films ===
Ann Arbor is the setting for much of the film The Four Corners of Nowhere (1995), as well as The Five-Year Engagement (2012). Parts of the film Jumper (2008) are set in Ann Arbor, using both footage shot locally and footage using Peterborough, Ontario as an Ann Arbor stand-in. Ann Arbor is also frequently mentioned in the television series Lost.

Starting in 2010, the Michigan Film Incentive lead to several major films shooting in and around Ann Arbor including Conviction. The film's offices and post-production were headquartered in Ann Arbor, using many area landmarks as backdrops. Shooting took place around Ann Arbor as well as smaller towns like Pittsfield Township, Chelsea and Dexter.
