= Fairy Doors of Ann Arbor =

Public art installation

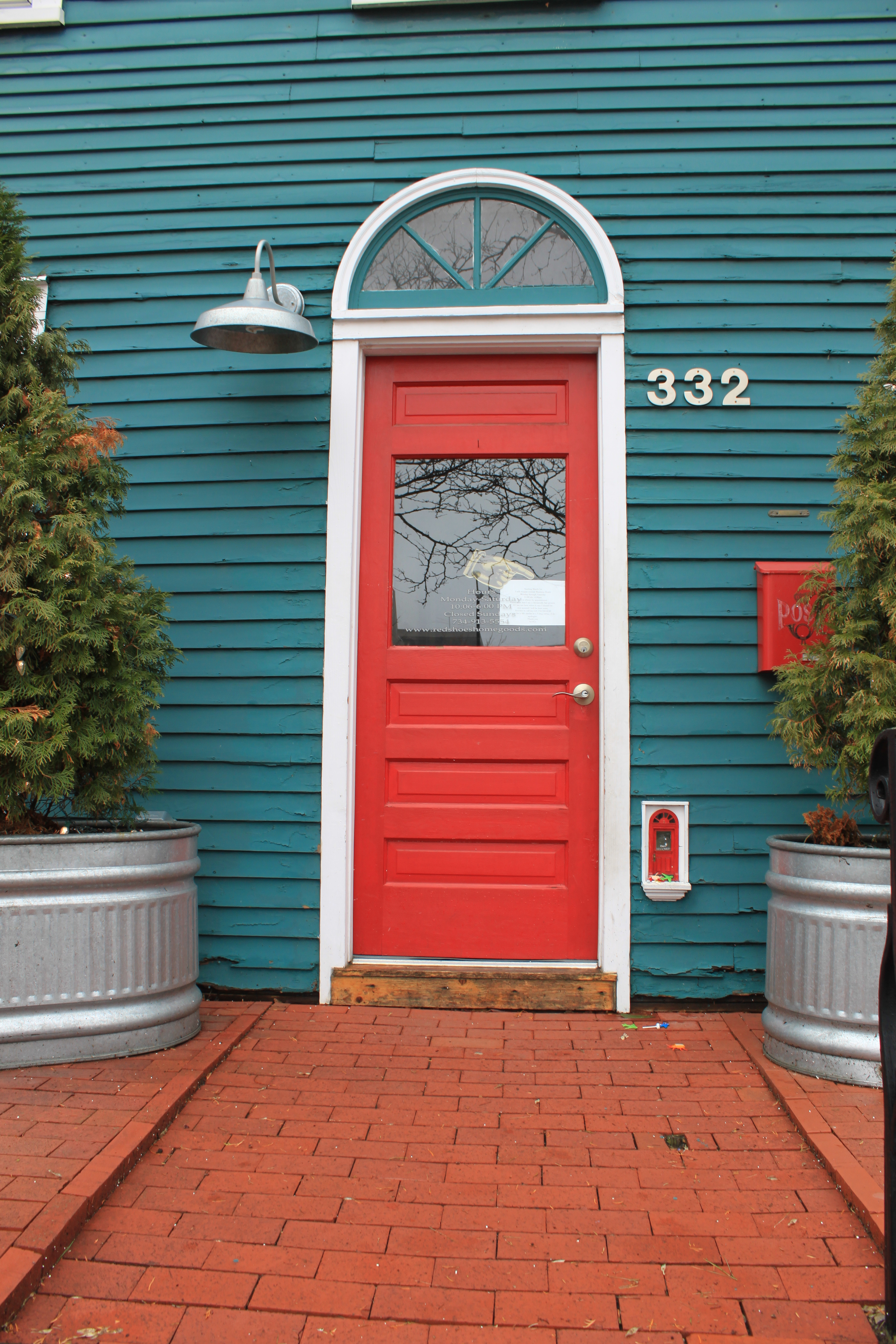
Red Shoes fairy door

The Fairy Doors of Ann Arbor are a series of small doors that are a type of installation art found in the city of Ann Arbor in the U.S. state of Michigan. The first one appeared in the baseboards of the home of Jonathan and Kathleen Wright in 1993. Subsequently, several others were discovered in their home: in the fireplace surround and two in the kitchen. On April 7, 2005, the first was seen in public on the exterior of Sweetwaters Coffee and Tea. Since then, ten more have shown up around Ann Arbor (as well as a "goblin door" parody), and seven of the original "public" doors still exist.

== History ==
The first public fairy door appeared outside Sweetwaters Coffee and Tea on April 7, 2005, installed by Jonathan B. Wright, a teacher of graphic design technologies. The next was installed outside of the Ann Arbor gift store Peaceable Kingdom and appeared on April 17, 2005. The third door was found on May 11, 2005, outside of the Selo-Shevel Gallery art gallery. On June 9, 2005, Jefferson Market received a fairy door, but the store closed in October 2007. The Ann Arbor Framing Co. discovered the next door on August 17, 2005, but the company closed in the summer of 2008 and the fairy door vanished. The concert hall The Ark hosted the next door when it appeared August 25, 2005. The furniture and gift store Red Shoes was next, where one appeared on November 17, 2005.

On April 11, 2006, a fairy door appeared at the boutique Voilà. When Voilà closed on November 15, 2006, the fairy door disappeared as well. The ninth door was installed in the back of Nicola's Books on September 8, 2006, and was built into a bookcase and books at the Ann Arbor District Library on November 4, 2006.

In 2010, a rural fairy door appeared in a not-for profit preschool and dependent older adult day care in Dexter, Michigan, called Generations Together. It is said to have a portal that can be found in Gordon Field, which is in front of Gordon Hall a historic landmark in Dexter. They are so new they have not been pictured and described in detail anywhere but on the urban-fairies.com website.

At one time, a few establishments kept guest books that visitors could sign, or in which they could ask pertinent questions or draw pictures. This led Wright to release the children's book Who's Behind the Fairy Doors?

== Locations and descriptions ==
Of the original ten public Ann Arbor fairy doors, seven still exist in and around the downtown area.

- The door at Sweetwaters is located inside, down on the baseboards opposite the counter. It is a simple white door with small details mimicking the detailing found outside the cafe.
- The door at the Peaceable Kingdom is outside, to the right of the entrance, and a small "fairy gift store" is visible inside.
- The Selo-Shevel Gallery door is found on the Liberty St. side of the building, at sidewalk level. It is a simple red door with tiny grey bricks framing the door.
- The door at The Ark can be found on the left side of what once was the ticket booth. The door mimics the style of the building and is a simple brown with a stained-glass window. During renovation of the Ark in 2018, the fairies temporarily replaced this door with a construction entrance in front of the building.
- The door at Red Shoes is both inside and out, directly to the right of the entrance. The small red door is a near-exact replica of the actual entrance; inside the store is a small green one similar to the doors found inside the building. Written on the red door outside is 'Ours 123-4:5683?', which is a take on the real entrance that lists the store 'hours'.
- The Ann Arbor District Library door is found on the end of the Fairytale and Folklore bookshelf in the Youth Department. It's a small blue double door with a teal frame and an entire room set inside of "books" like the Encyclopædia Britannica and Hans Christian Andersen's Eighty Fairy Tales. Inside you can see a small table, decorated walls, and other furniture.
- The door at Nicola's Books in the Westgate Shopping Center on Jackson Rd., is set above the fireplace in the back of the store. It is dark brown and the frame is made of two books spines Andersen's Fairy Tales and Cinderella and Other Italian Fairy Tales.

Other newer fairy doors are appearing around Ann Arbor:

- Two additional doors appeared next to the original Sweetwaters door. One is a small, wooden building with a small coffee table inside. The other is a laboratory building the fairies built to help players from a local escape room track down an escaped artificial intelligence.
- The door at the Crazy Wisdom bookstore and tea shop on S. Main Street is by the front entrance. Two doors can be opened to view the inside, or what's on the other side, of the fairy door, which features a small dwelling of some sort.
- The door at the Google offices in Ann Arbor is located in the soffit of the "Ann Arbor" room. This door has a glass panel with an aluminum frame and the fairies' own "Giggle" logo in Google type and colors.
- Two fairy doors found in the FordLabs office. One is located in the entrance lounge. This fairy door is always ajar to welcome visitors to peer into the lives of the Flabfish fairies. Another door located deeper in the office has a portal to take employees directly to the Ford office in Dearborn.
- The fairy doors found at Generations Together and in Gordon Field are identical. They are made of rustic wood and their porches contain tiny bouquets of wheat on either side of the doors. Their porches are supported tree branches.
- The door at Washtenaw Dairy, located on the corner of South Ashley and West Madison, is found outside to the right of the main entrance to the shop.
- The main floor of the Bob and Betty Beyster Building at University of Michigan, which houses the Computer Science and Engineering division. The door is set on a tower computer case. Pressing the computer's power button turns the lights up inside the case, revealing a dreamscape world with winged fairies.
- A miniature ATM exists at the Bank of Ann Arbor location on Washington.
- There's a fairy door in the ATM vestibule of the Hooper Hathaway building on Main Street.
- Arborland Starbucks features a fairyland cafe inside the store.
- The Document Delivery Office at the Harlan Hatcher Graduate Library at the University of Michigan has a fairy door, which sits atop the returns box across from the office.
- There is a fairy door inside Silvio's Organic Ristorante e Pizzeria.
- The Himalayan Bazaar on Main Street has a Sherpa fairy door in the back of the store.

== Local response ==
The fairy doors have taken on a cult following in Ann Arbor and surrounding small towns, such as Dexter, where the first rural fairy door and its portal can be found. The local children leave gifts in the hopes that real fairies will receive them. Some presents left at the doors include pennies and nickels, drawings, tiny packages, candies, and shiny rocks. Some of the doors, like the one found in Sweetwaters, have guestbooks nearby for visitors to write reflections, stories, draw fairies, and ask questions. Sometimes a "fairy" will answer the questions in the journals. The general attitude toward the fairy doors is that of mysticism and childlike adoration.

The Ann Arbor Chamber of Commerce and some of the businesses with fairy doors hand out maps and sell copies of Jonathan B. Wright's Who's Behind the Fairy Doors? and posters with pictures of each door and its location. Many articles, including local and national, have been published regarding the doors. The Michigan Daily, the University of Michigan's student newspaper published an article titled "Are Real Life Fairies A2's Busiest Carpenters?" on October 12, 2010. The Washington Post published an article on April 23, 2006 titled "Ann Arbor Proudly Presents: The Doors."

== Other doors ==
The fairy doors have made appearances in the neighboring towns as well. An Ypsilanti woman found a fairy door in the base of a tree on her front lawn. Saline, to the southwest, held a "Fairy Door Treasure Hunt" event in the spring of 2010. Nearby Dexter held a fairy door art exhibition and contest around the same time and plans to hold it annually.

The goblin door is a "sinister" version of the fairy doors and is a little taller than they are. It is in Ann Arbor between The Ark and Seyfried Jewelers on South Main St. As of July 2012, downtown Ann Arbor locksmith Vogel's has arranged a mass of keys to form the word "Fairy Door", hinting that there may be a new fairy door to come. As of 29 May 2014, the Ypsilanti neighborhood of Normal Park had 14 doors in resident yards.

== Gallery ==
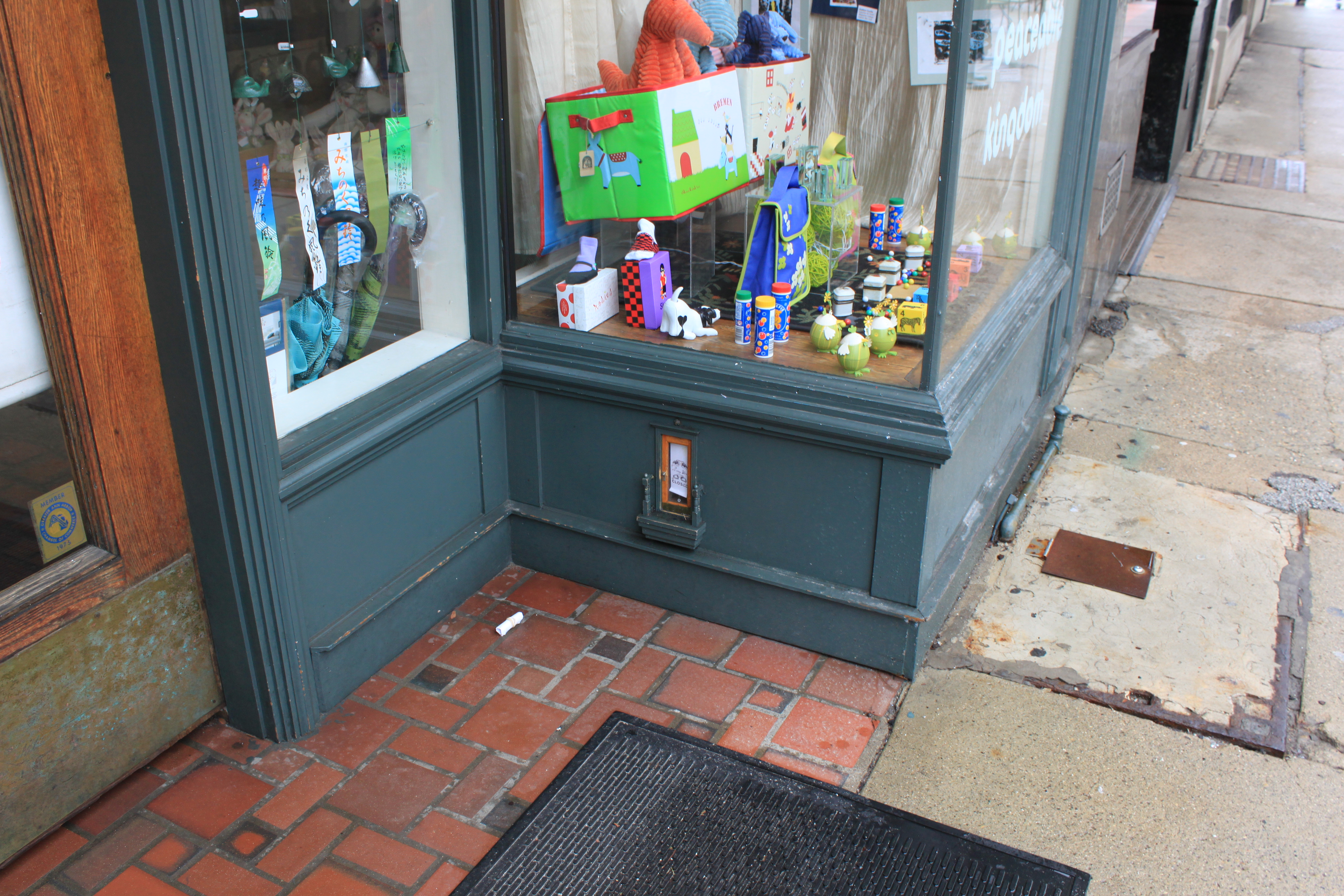
Peaceable Kingdom fairy door.

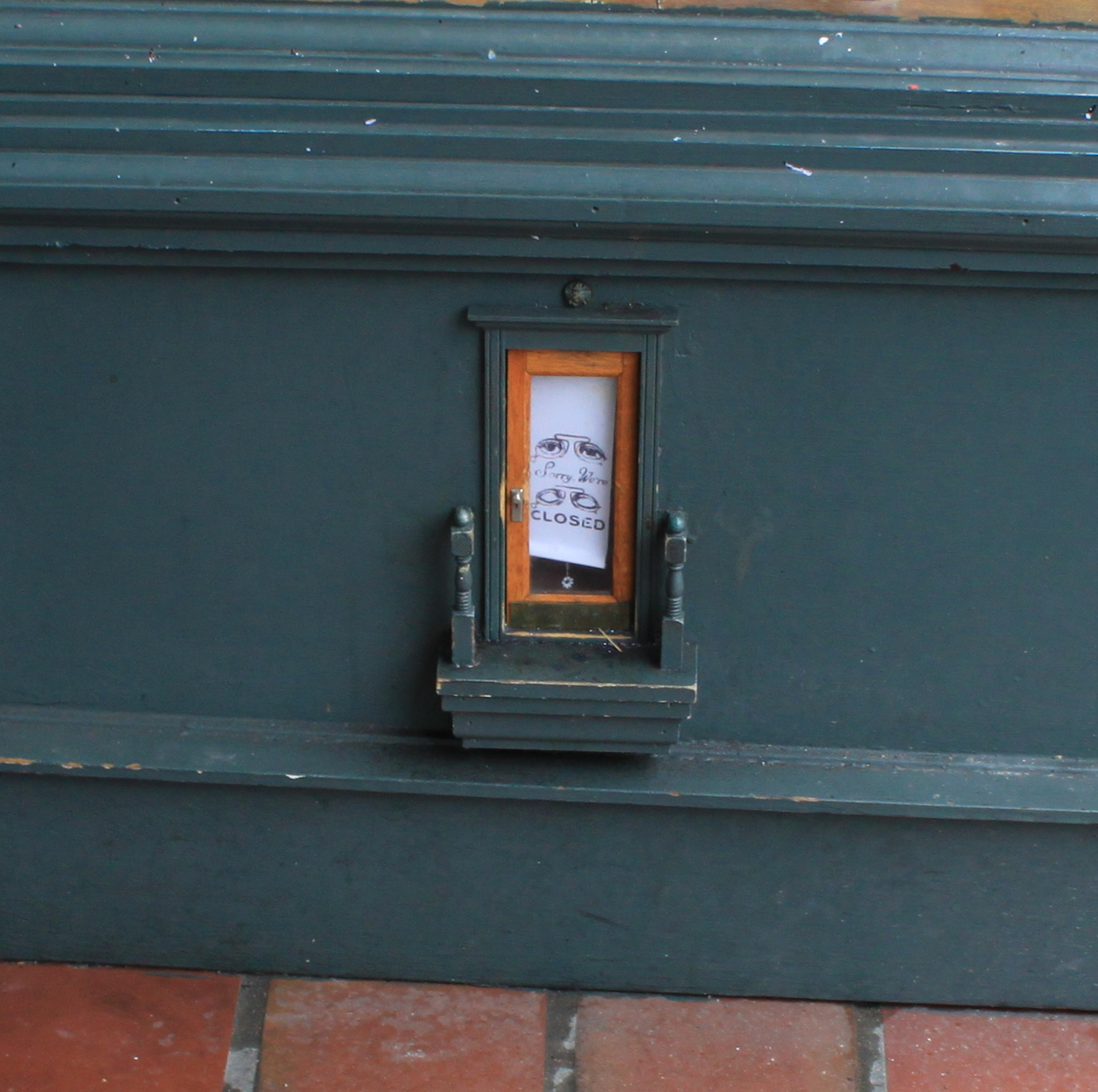
Peaceable Kingdom fairy door closeup.

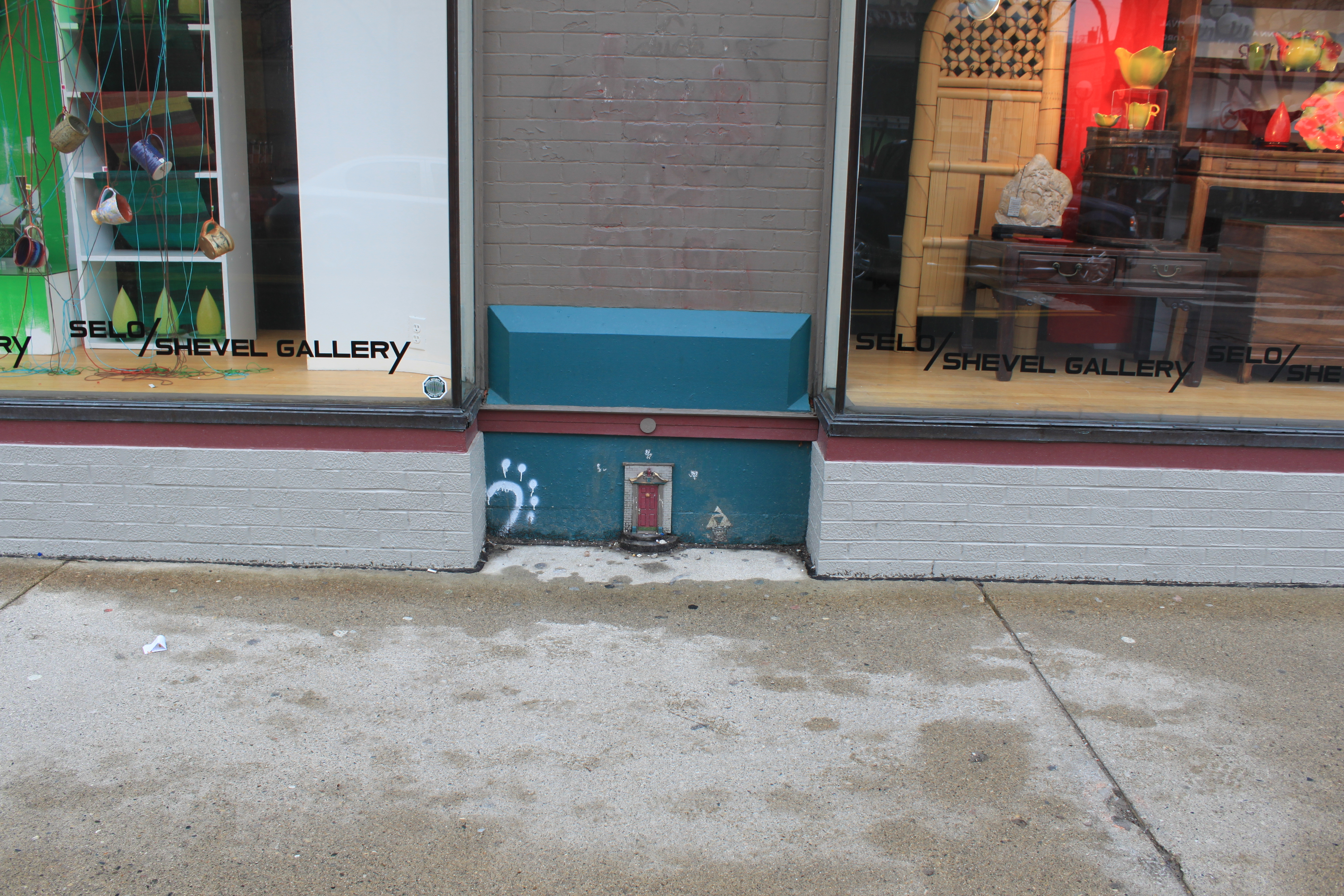
Selo Shevel Gallery fairy door.

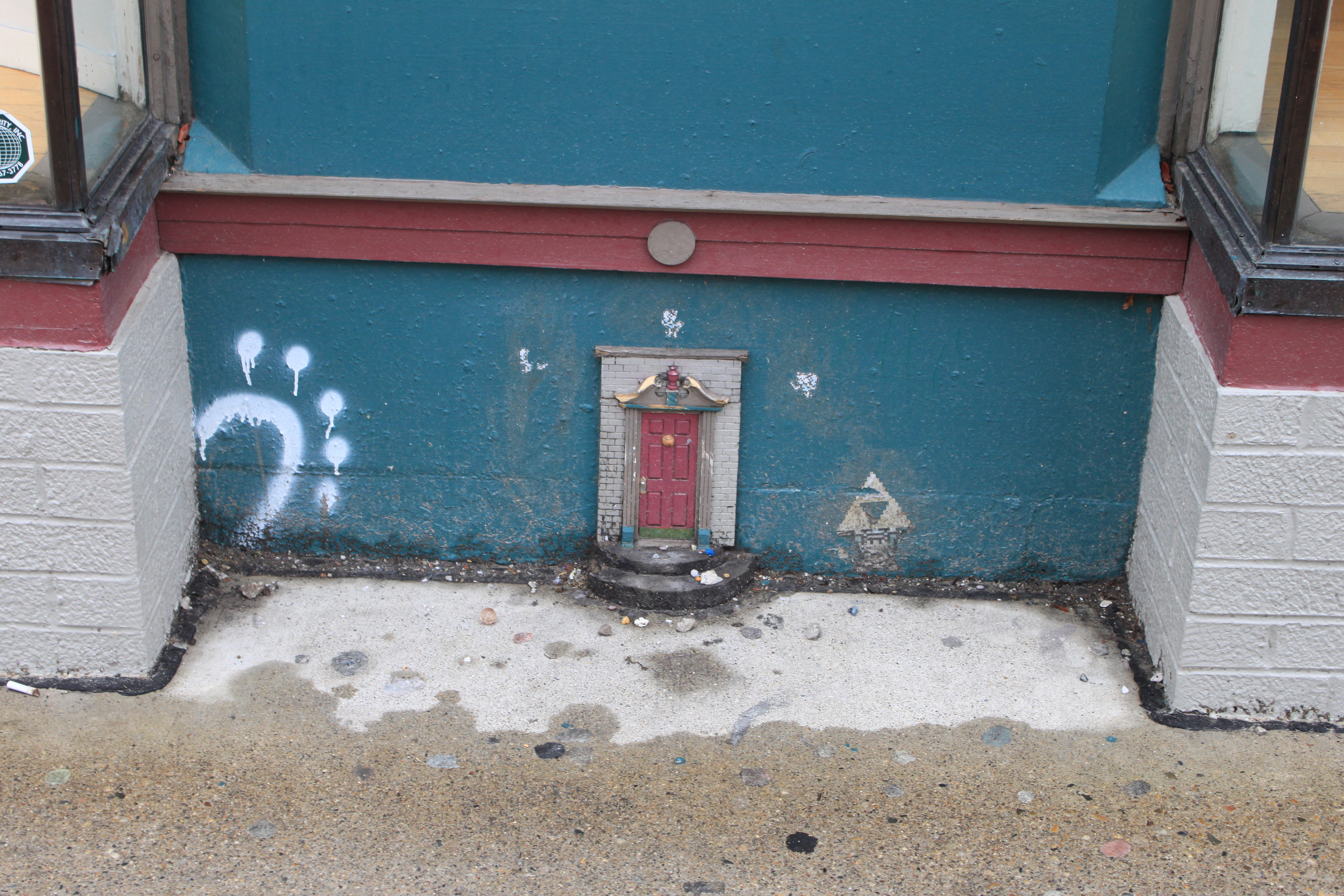
Selo Shevel Gallery fairy door closeup.

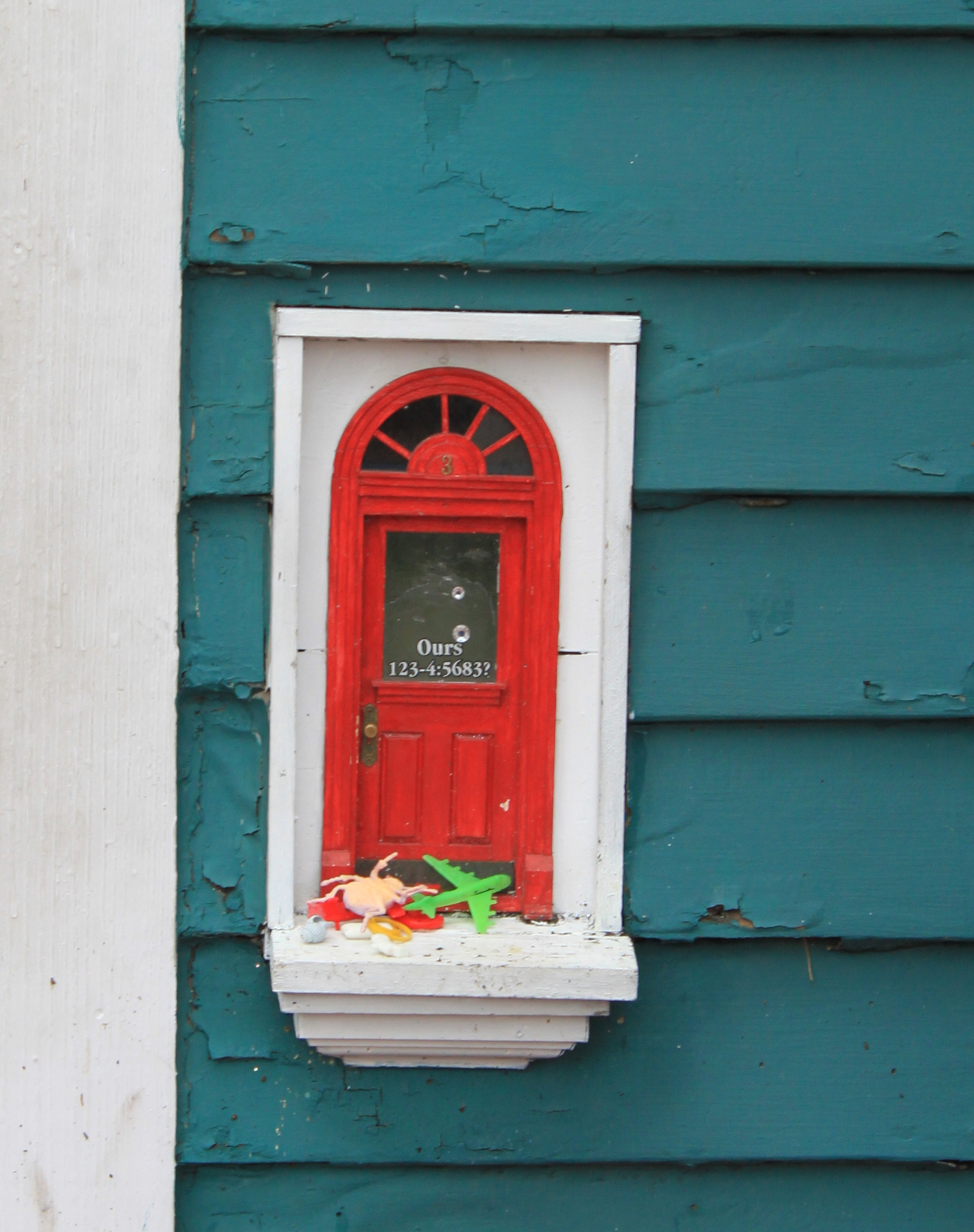
Red Shoes fairy door closeup.

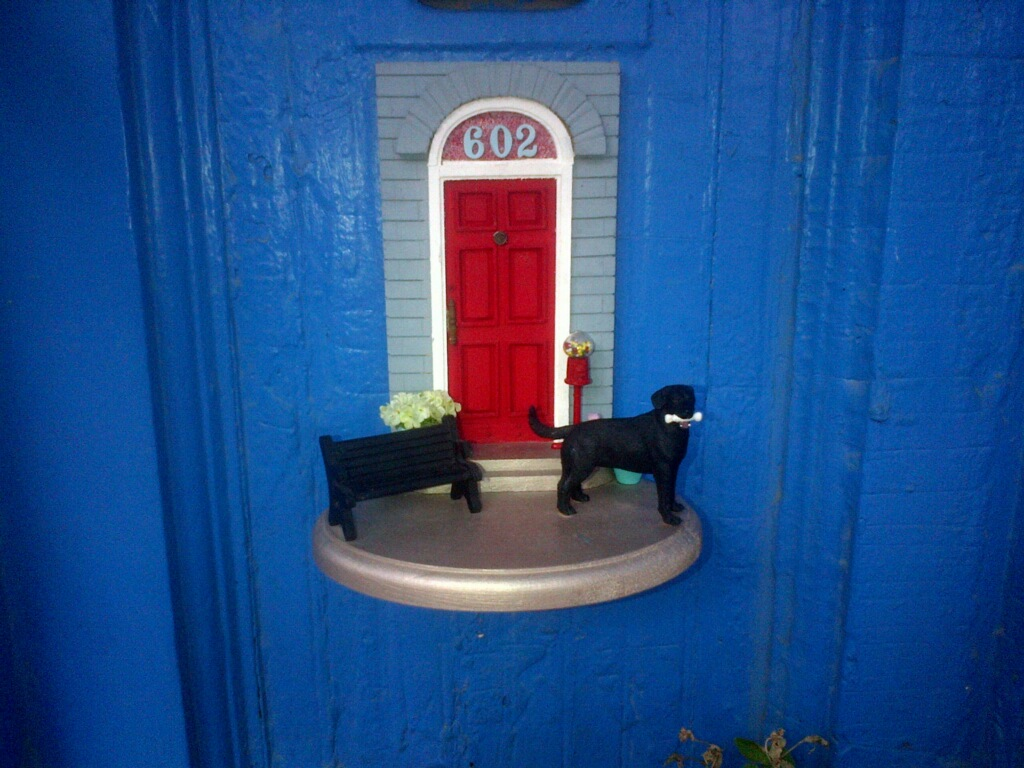
Washtenaw Dairy fairy door closeup.

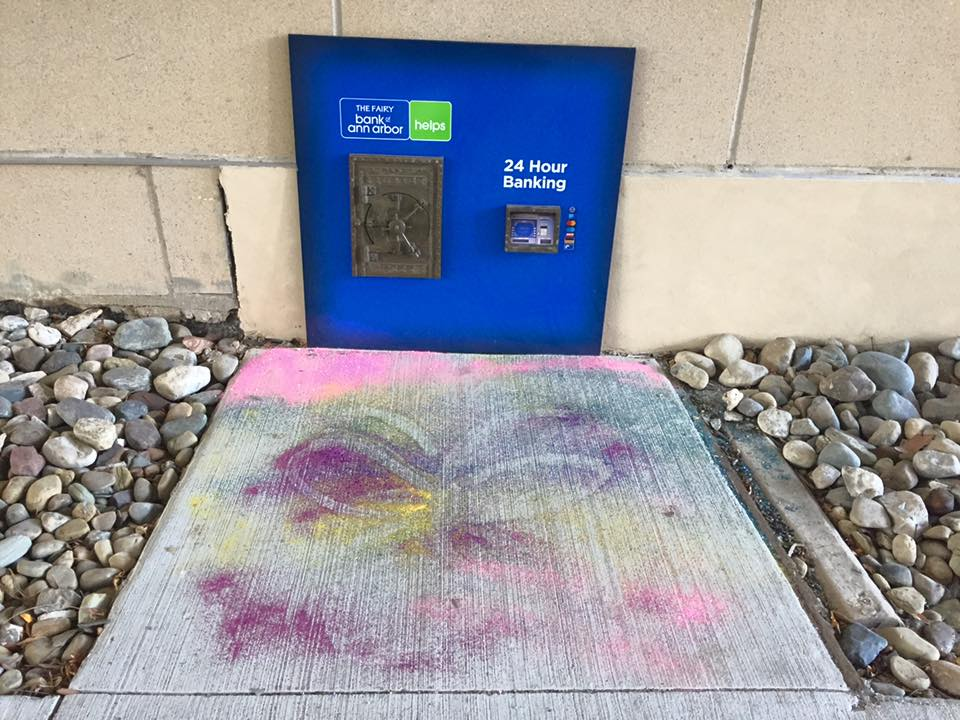
Bank of Ann Arbor fairy door and ATM.
