= Ann Arbor District Library =

Public library system in Washtenaw County, Michigan, USA

Coordinates: 42.278801°N 83.746157°W

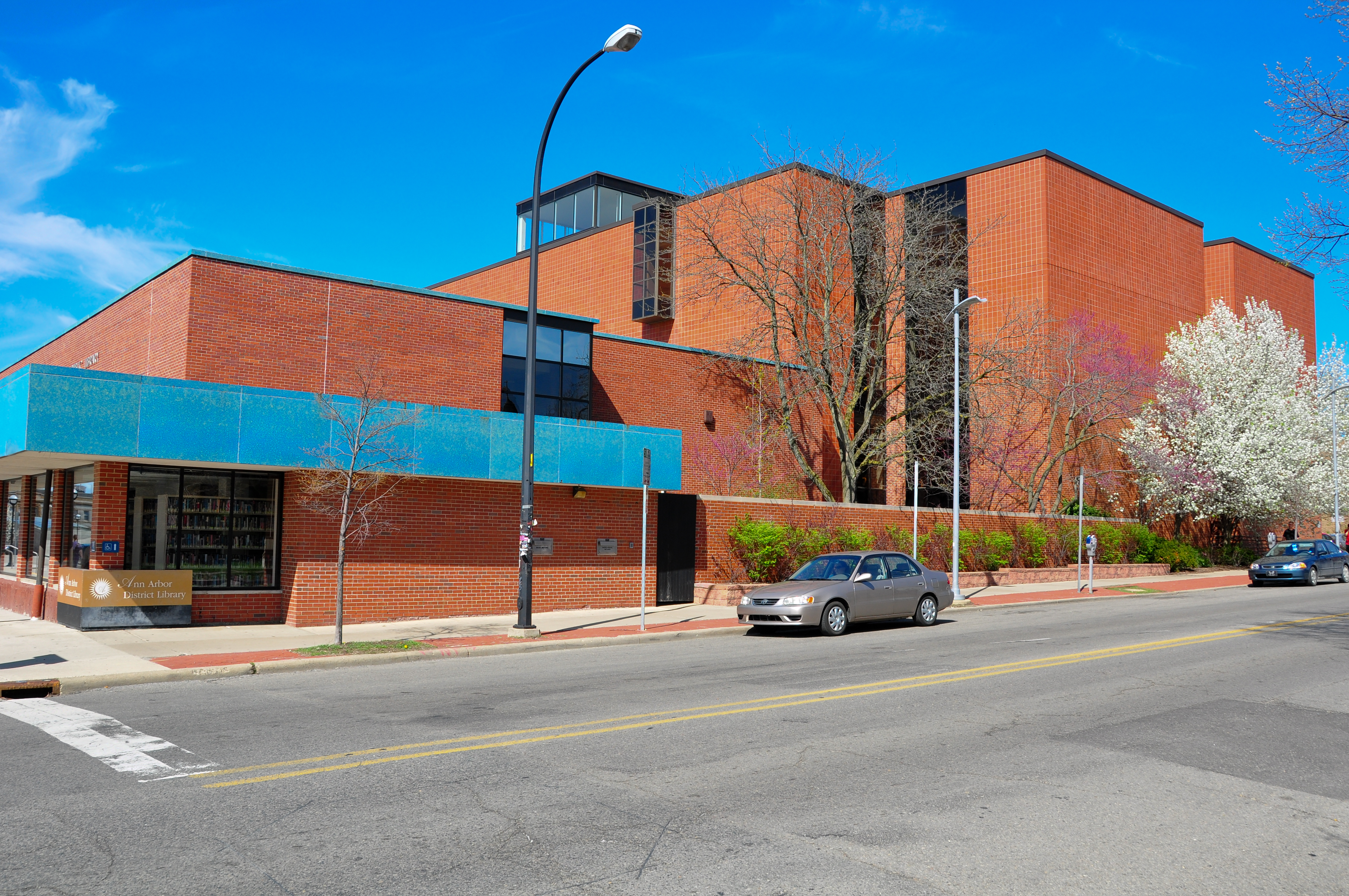
- Type: Public
- Branches: 5

Other information
- Director: Eli Neiburger
- Website: https://aadl.org

The Ann Arbor District Library (AADL) is a public library system that serves the residents of the Ann Arbor Public Schools school district, based in Ann Arbor, Michigan. The Downtown Library, located at 343 South Fifth Avenue, was dedicated in 1957 and had building additions in 1974 and 1991. AADL also includes four branch libraries: Malletts Creek, Traverwood, Pittsfield, and Westgate. At the beginning of the fiscal year of 2021–2022, the library reopened for full service after a year of vestibule service during the COVID-19 pandemic. 8,403 new library cards were issued during the fiscal year, and AADL saw a total door count of 909,101. The library's system holds over 480,000 materials - including books, DVDs and Blu-rays, CDs, audiobooks, tools, art prints, language materials, and more. These materials saw almost 5 million checkouts in the 2021-2022 fiscal year. The library also offers access to databases and Libby, an online source of ebooks and audiobooks. While these numbers don't fully compare to pre-COVID-19 numbers, they're approaching an equilibrium.

In 1997, the Library was named “National Library of the Year” by Library Journal, the first library in Michigan to receive the honor. In 2022, for the 15th year in a row, AADL earned five stars in the Library Journal's annual ratings of public libraries across the nation.

== Board of trustees ==
All trustees are elected at large from the District. The Library District has the same boundaries as the Ann Arbor School District, with the exception of Northfield Township. Terms are four years long beginning January 1 of the year they are elected.

Officers are elected by the Board at the Annual Board Meeting in January. Officers serve for a one-year term and for no more than two consecutive years in the same office. Board members as of December 2024 are:

- Molly Kleinman, President
- Aidan Sova, Vice President
- Lisa Campbell, Treasurer
- Onna Solomon, Secretary
- Catherine Hadley, Trustee
- Jim Leija, Trustee
- Scott Trudeau, Trustee

== Locations ==
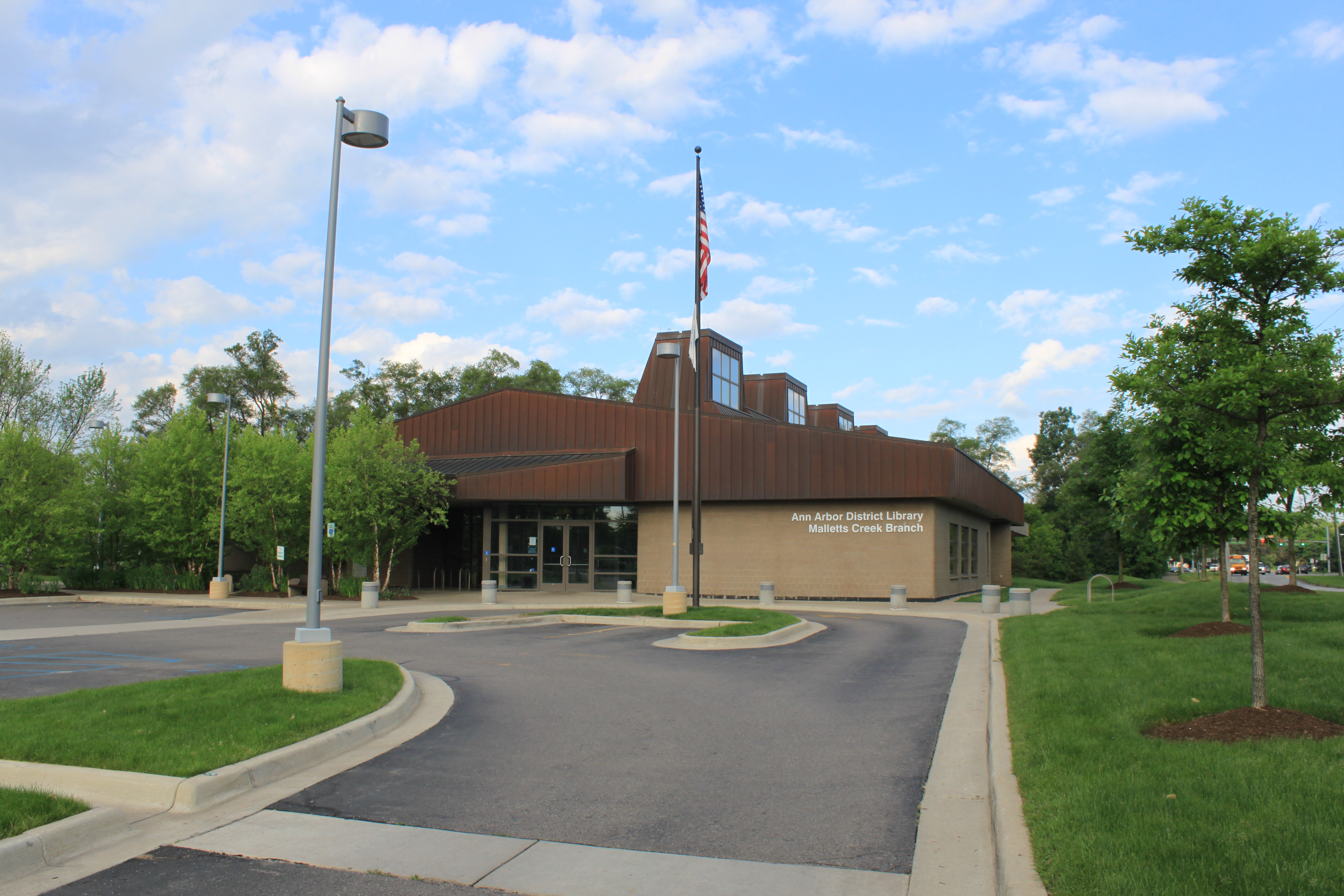
Malletts Creek Branch

- Downtown Library: 343 South Fifth Avenue
- Malletts Creek Branch: 3090 East Eisenhower Parkway
- Traverwood Branch: 3333 Traverwood Drive
- Westgate Branch: 2503 Jackson Avenue
- Pittsfield Branch: 2359 Oak Valley Drive

== Expansion ==
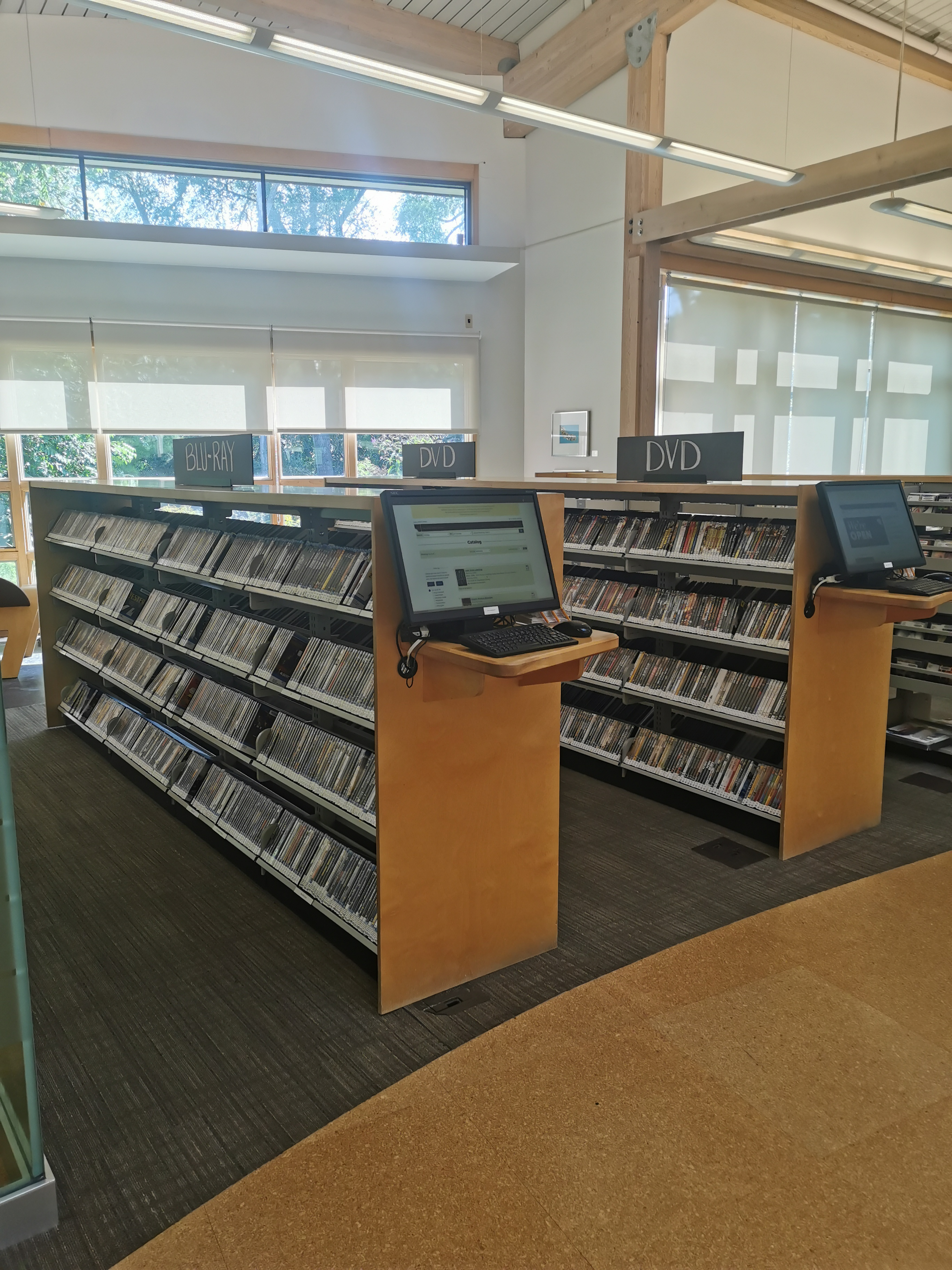
Interior of the Malletts Creek Branch

The vision of branch libraries for the Ann Arbor District Library system began with former Library Director Homer Chance. Recognizing the need for access to materials and facilities beyond the Downtown Library, Chance opened the first branch library in Ann Arbor, the Loving Branch, in 1965. In 1977, the West Branch (now called "Westgate") opened its doors. The Northeast Branch began serving the community in 1981.

Expansion continued in 2004 with the opening of the Malletts Creek Branch as a replacement for the Loving Branch. This branch is a unique model of sustainable design featuring solar heating, natural day lighting, a vegetated green roof, convection cooling, naturally captured and filtered storm water, native plants and grasses, and many uses of materials that are renewable resources. The Malletts Creek Branch was awarded the 2005 American Institute of Architects Michigan (AIA Michigan) Award for Sustainable Design.

In 2006, AADL opened the Pittsfield Branch, a community-based learning center serving the residents of the southwest quadrant of Ann Arbor and Pittsfield Township. This branch, along with its surrounding landscape, capitalizes on environmental principles, allowing the overall project to operate more in harmony with the ecosystem and the community in which it serves.

On June 30, 2008, the Traverwood Branch opened, replacing the Northeast Branch. The Traverwood Branch is designed to have as little impact on natural landscape features as possible. Sustainable design features include an innovative stormwater management system and the reuse of harvested ash trees from the building site. A rain garden is located on the south side of the building. The design of the Branch takes advantage of natural day lighting.

Since 2004, the Library's branch expansion program has emphasized sustainability. By using sustainable design in the construction of each branch, the Library will teach, by example, responsible coexistence with the natural environment.

The West Branch closed for renovation in November 2015, reopening in September 2016 as the Westgate Branch. Formerly the smallest in the system, the Westgate Branch quadrupled in size to 21,000 square feet (2,000 m^{2}), adding a cafe operated by Argus Farm Stop.

== Services ==
=== AADL.org ===
The AADL website provides access to the Library's catalog, events, services, research databases and users’ Library accounts management. Website users can post blogs, comment on blogs, subscribe to RSS feeds, tag, create a personal card catalog, and write reviews. Video on Demand of past Library events is available, and users can subscribe to a video or audio podcast through iTunes that will automatically download new video of library productions as they are added to the collection.

The AADL website also includes a section for Old News, upkept by the AADL Archives Team. They have made arrangements with permission to scan and provide an archive of the following publications: Signal of Liberty, The Ann Arbor Argus, The Ann Arbor Courier, and most recently, The Ann Arbor News. The site is full text searchable and each article includes links for the article author, keywords, people and photographer.

=== Summer Game ===
The AADL hosts The Summer Game, a community outreach program in which people earn points for using library services. These points can be redeemed for prizes. In 2025, The Summer Game had 16,000 participants, including children and adults.

=== Video games ===
The Ann Arbor District Library was one of the first public libraries to experiment with using video games to attract teens and youth to the library. AADL now hosts tournaments in Mario Kart: Double Dash, Super Smash Bros., and Dance Dance Revolution.

=== Washtenaw Library for the Blind and Print Disabled ===
The Ann Arbor District Library has housed and administrated the Washtenaw County branch of the National Library Service for the Blind and Print Disabled since February 2009. The Washtenaw Library for the Blind and Print Disabled (WLBPD at AADL) is a free service which loans books, magazines, and videos in alternative formats such as digital audiobooks, Braille, large print, or descriptive video to eligible individuals who live in Washtenaw County.

== Bond proposal ==
On November 6, 2012, Ann Arbor citizens voted "no" on a $65 million bond proposal for the construction of a new downtown library. The final vote was 55.17% to 44.83%.
