= Ann Arbor Art Fairs =

Group of four award-winning, not-for-profit United States art fairs

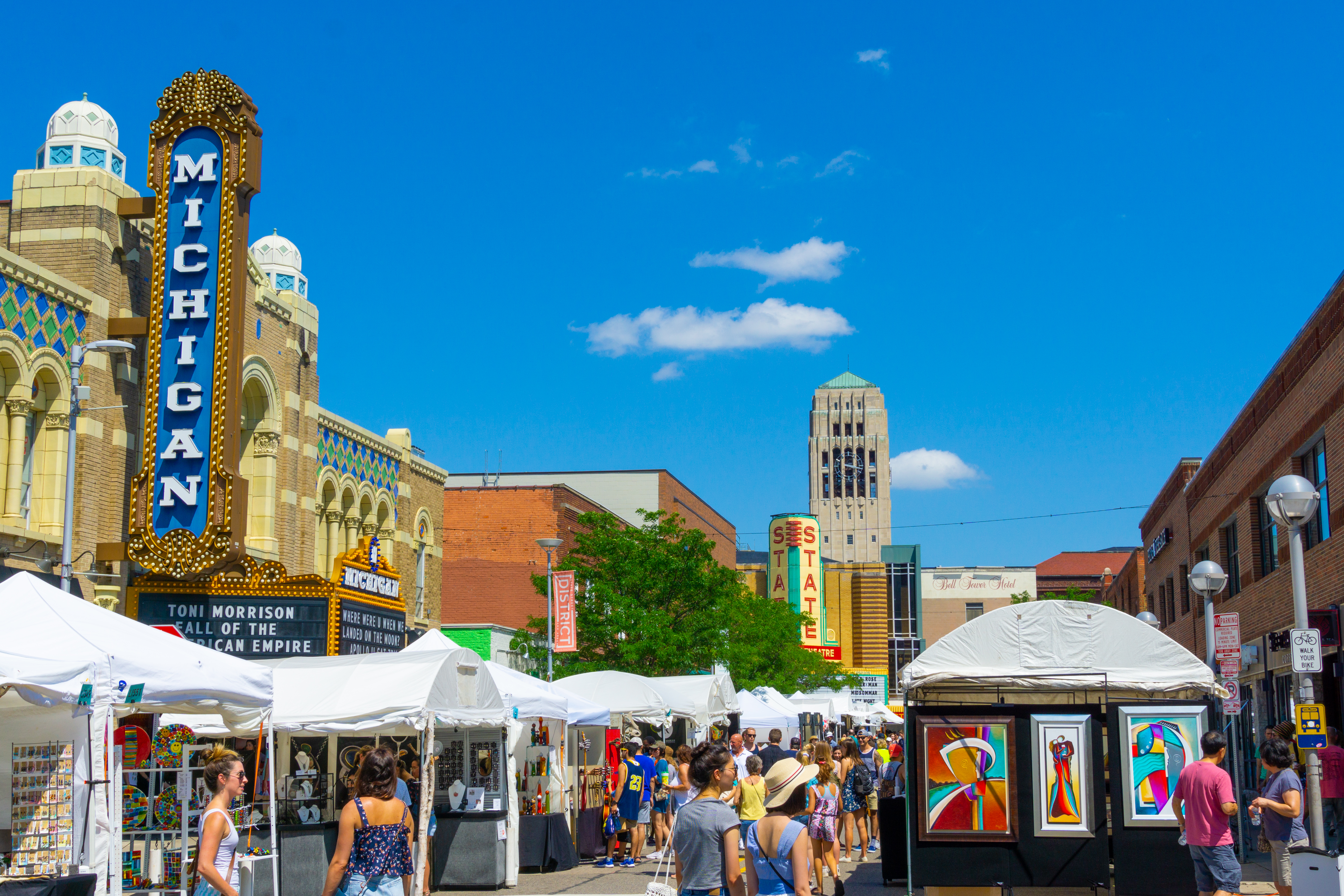
- Nickname: Art Fair
- Genre: Fair
- Date: Typically the third weekend in July
- Frequency: Annually
- Location: Downtown Ann Arbor, Michigan
- Country: United States
- Inaugurated: 1960
- Most recent: 17 July 2025 - 19 July 2025
- Next event: 16 July 2026 - 18 July 2026
- Website: www.theannarborartfair.com

The Ann Arbor Art Fair is a group of three award-winning, not-for-profit United States art fairs that take place annually in Ann Arbor, Michigan. Over 400,000 visitors attend the fairs each year. Prior to 2016, the fair ran Wednesday through Saturday, generally the third weekend in July. Beginning in 2016, the days shifted to Thursday through Sunday. There was no event in 2020 as the COVID-19 pandemic was to blame; it returned in 2021.

The three official fairs are The Ann Arbor Street Art Fair, the Original; the State Street Art Fair; and the Ann Arbor Summer Art Fair. In addition to art exhibits, the fairs feature music performances, demonstrations, merchant marketplace, and interactive art activities.

== The fairs ==
=== Ann Arbor Street Art Fair, The Original ===
The oldest of the three, the Ann Arbor Street Art Fair, The Original, was established in 1960 by a collaboration between the South University Businessmen's Association, Ann Arbor Art Association, and the Chamber of Commerce. Originally the Art Association did not believe artist would want their work to be displayed in the street stating, “No good artist will sit in the street.” That proved not to be true. The first fair attracted only 132 artists, 99 of them being local, by the third annual fair there were 220 artists.

=== Ann Arbor State Street Art Fair ===
The State Street Area Art Fair, originating in 1968, holds a special place in the Ann Arbor Art Fair tradition with Bargain Days roots, a merchant event preceding the Ann Arbor Art Fair by 32 years. It is supported by the State Street Area Association (DBA State Street District) in collaboration with local businesses. The fair has maintained its commitment to community development and artist opportunities expanded over time. Its unique funding model, where 100% of the State Street Area Art Fair revenue is invested in arts & culture, local businesses, and community events, reflects the fair's dedication to its founding principles.

=== Ann Arbor Summer Art Fair ===
The Ann Arbor Summer Art Fair takes place in two locations, State Street from Madison to William, and along Main Street and Liberty to Fifth Avenue. Produced by The Guild of Artists & Artisans, a non-profit artist membership organization, it features 375 jury selected artists.

It all began in the spring of 1970, about ten years following the premiere of the original Ann Arbor Street Fair. A group of young artists from Ann Arbor began working on a separate art fair which would give emerging artists, craftspeople and art students a chance to “take to the streets.” Calling it the Free Arts Festival, they set up this “free fair” on the University of Michigan's “Diag” on Central Campus. Funding and management for this new fair was provided by the participating artists themselves. Later in the mid-70s the event was renamed the Ann Arbor Summer Art Fair.

=== Ann Arbor South University Art Fair ===
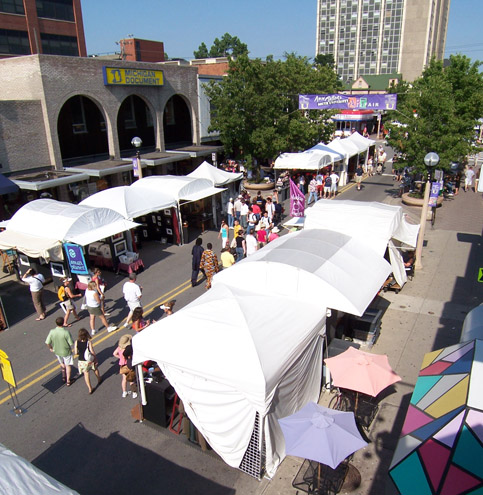
South University Art Fair in 2006

The Ann Arbor South University Art Fair is nationally recognized as a fine arts and crafts fair. The South University Area Association, the fair's organizers, dissolved in September 2020; the fair has been taken over by the Ann Arbor Summer Art Fair.

== Art Fair Food ==
The usual fair food is offered such as French fries, cotton candy, funnel fries, caramel apples and fried Twinkies. However community businesses and local vendors offer a variety of specialized cuisine from restaurants across the city in the street and with grab & go food.

== Protest from residents ==
Given the traffic disruption and the inconvenience of having a large number of visitors come in for the week, many Ann Arbor residents dislike the fairs and have protested against them, rallying under the slogan of "It's not art, and it's not fair." In 2005, in an effort to cultivate a better relationship with locals the fairs started a tradition of holding a "Townie Street Party" before the fairs begin expanded to all Fairs activating a community event prior to the Ann Arbor Art Fair event date. The First Townie Party was planned and supported by all four fairs.

== See also ==
- Ann Arbor, Michigan
- Culture in Ann Arbor, Michigan
