= Fairy door =

Miniature door, usually set into the base of a tree

A fairy door is a miniature door, usually set into the base of a tree, behind which may be small spaces where people can leave notes, wishes, or gifts for the "fairies".

== Uses, materials and controversies ==
Fairy doors can be purchased commercially and many are public art installations crafted by unknown artists.

Some parents and guardians use fairy doors to stimulate their children's imaginations and prompt creative thinking, describing the fairies as creatures that use their magical powers to protect children from bad dreams, grant their wishes if they are well-behaved, and replace lost teeth with small rewards.

Fairy doors, however, may be harmful to the environment. They often involve driving nails into trees or putting chemical glues on tree barks, which can put some trees under stress and expose them to greater risk of disease. Fairy doors also tend to degrade due to exposure to the elements and may contribute to environmental pollution if they contain plastic, chemical colors, and other polluting substances.

== Notable fairy doors ==
Fairy doors can be found in many locations, most of which are attributed to anonymous artists.

- Golden Gate Park, San Francisco: In 2013, author Tony Powell, with help from his son Rio, placed a fairy door that was hand-crafted with stain-finished wood, complete with a drawer-pull door handle and brass hinges, another measuring a foot tall. The door was removed by park officials shortly after its installation, but was replaced with a new door due to public outcry. The door with two tiny brass hinges was removed for concerns of damaging the tree, but was replaced with a door the park officials had made by tracing the removed, beyond-repair door onto wood, and had one giant steel hinge.
- Alameda, California: "An urban art movement of tiny doors hitting the curbs, trees, and public spaces on the Island and spreads a little whimsy."
- Fairy Doors of Ann Arbor: A series of small doors that typically replicated the doors of the buildings they were installed on or in.
- Putnam, Connecticut: The downtown area has a dozen fairy doors created by different artists. Each door is stylized to represent the major American cities: New York, Chicago, Boston, Seattle, Nashville, and New Orleans.
- Portland, Oregon: The city has two fairy doors in a northeast community garden. The doors are housed in a miniature fairy garden within the community garden. The fairy garden holds a hotel, a Ferris wheel, and an archery field.
- Maricara Natural Area, Portland, Oregon: Several doors were installed in the area and were well received by most locals. The doors were eventually removed by an unknown person posing as a Parks and Recreation worker. They also posted a falsified notice from Parks and Recreation that cited city codes as the reason for the door's removal, prompting Parks and Recreation to clarify that they did not remove the doors.
- Wayford Woods, Crewkerne, Somerset: About 200 fairy doors made of different materials and by different artists were installed along the woodland trails, leading to an increase of tourists. As the town was unable to deal with the increased tourism and garbage began to accumulate along the woodland trails, the doors were removed by trustees.
- St Anne's Park, Dublin: has a fairy tree with a variety of fairy doors.
- Alexandria, Virginia's Del Ray neighborhood: Inspired by a small fairy garden in an apartment complex, artist Kate Young began installing fairy doors around Del Ray in 2017. Young has installed about 100 doors, including a fairy post office.
- Castletown, Isle of Man: The Balley Cashtal Beg, a "town" of 70 doors installed throughout the main town, which represent homes for the Mooinjer veggey, as they are locally known.
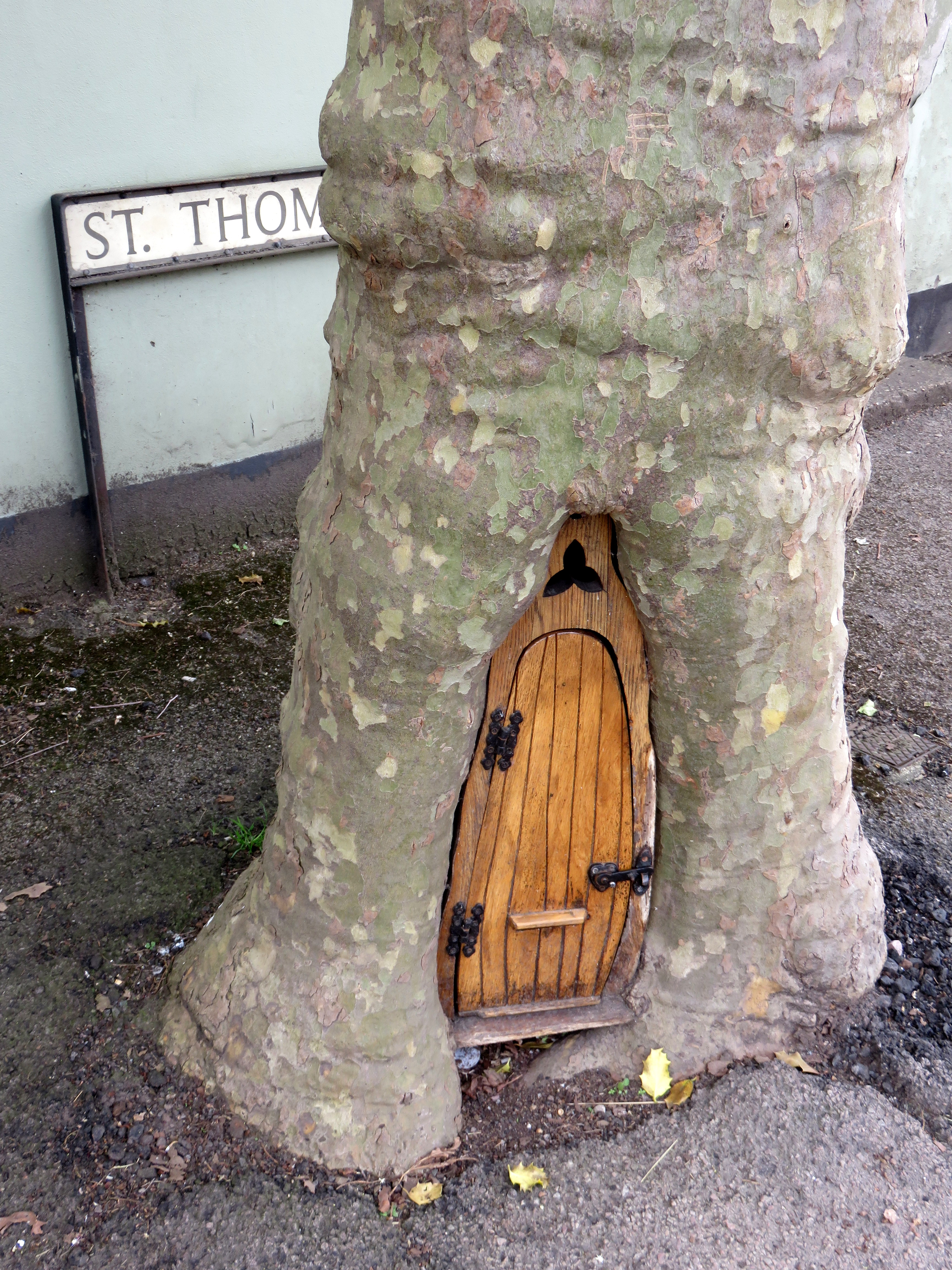
Fairy door at Monmouth, Wales

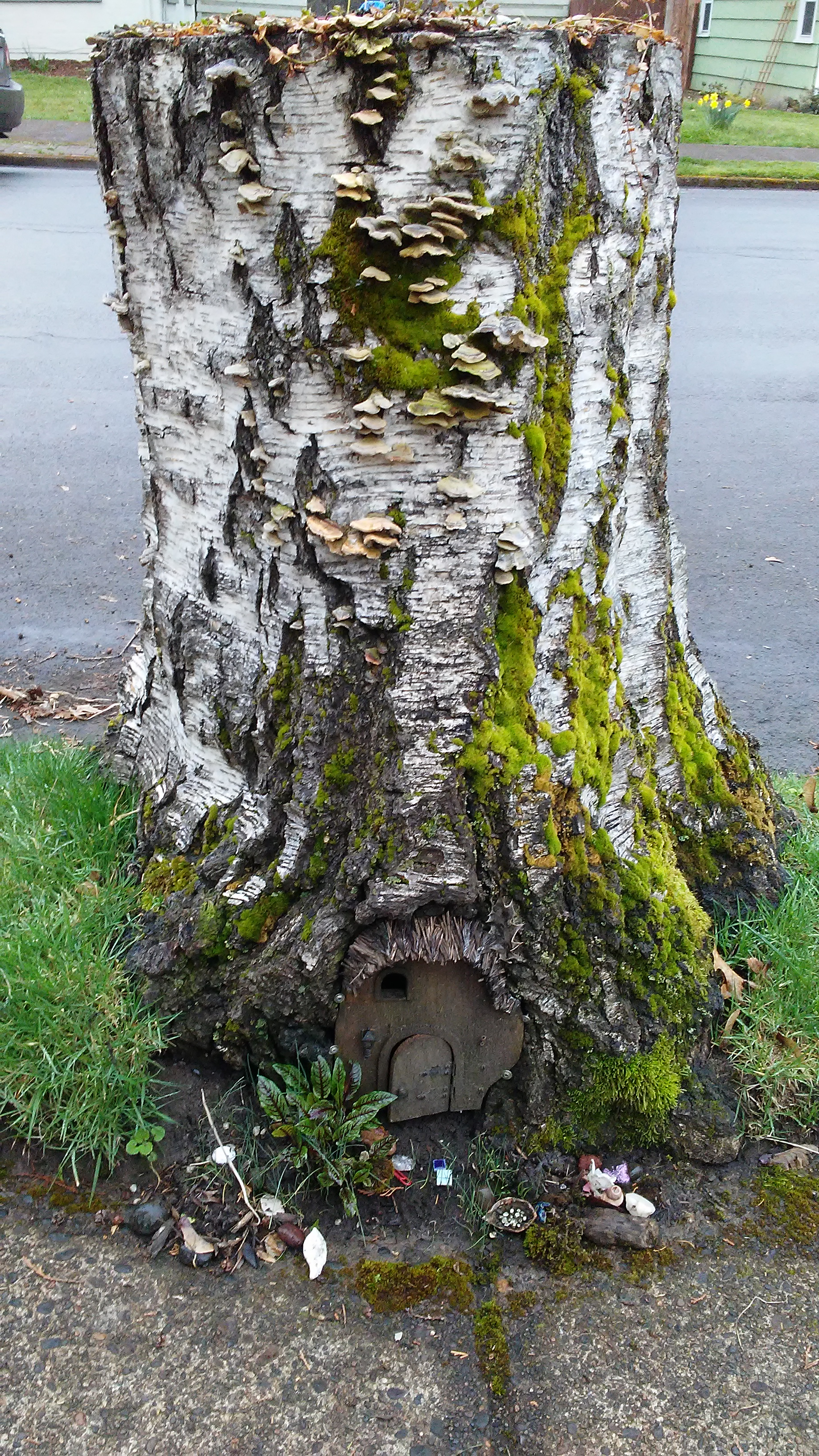
Fairy door in Corvallis, Oregon

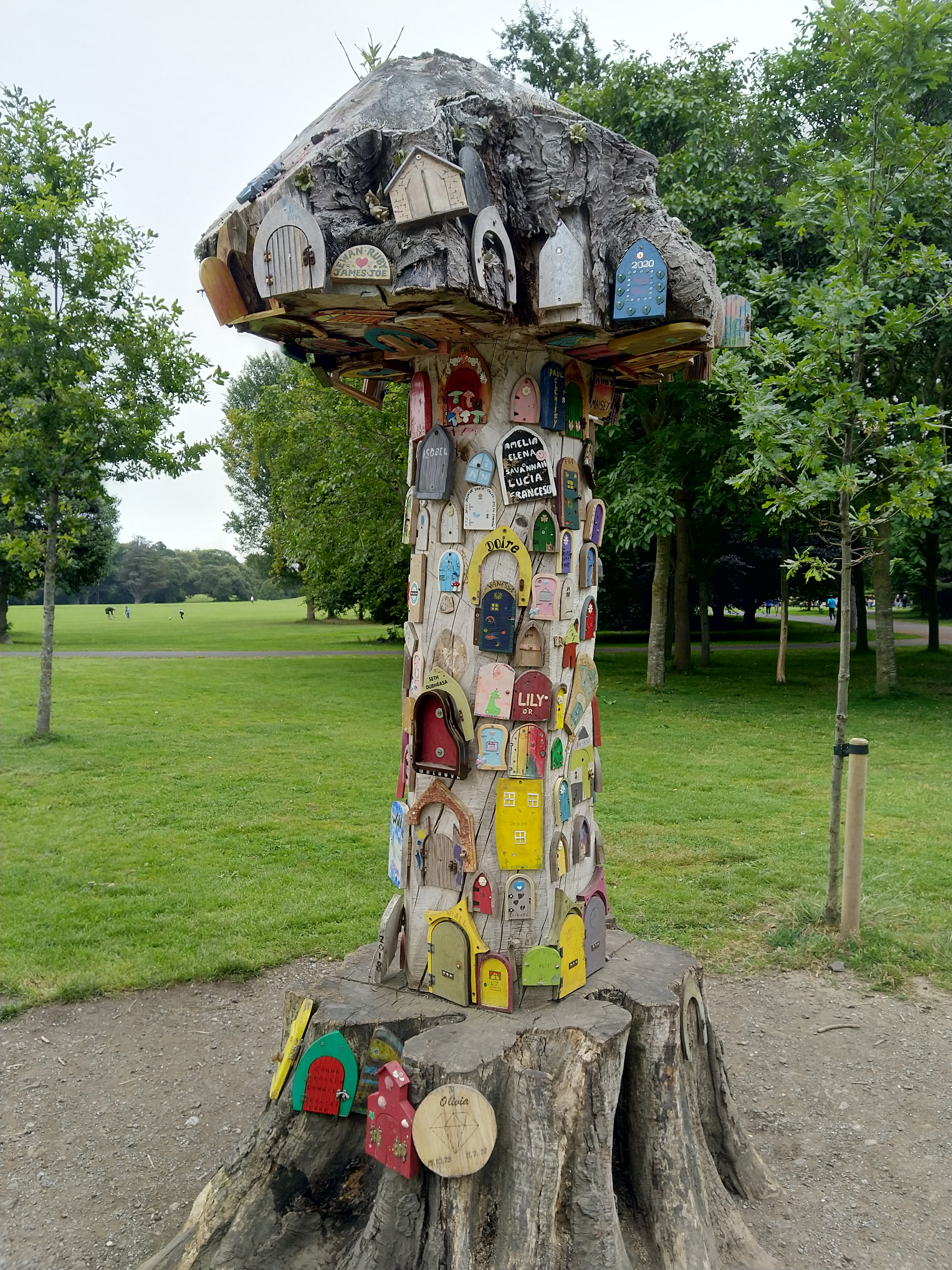
Fairy tree, Sain Anne's Park, Dublin

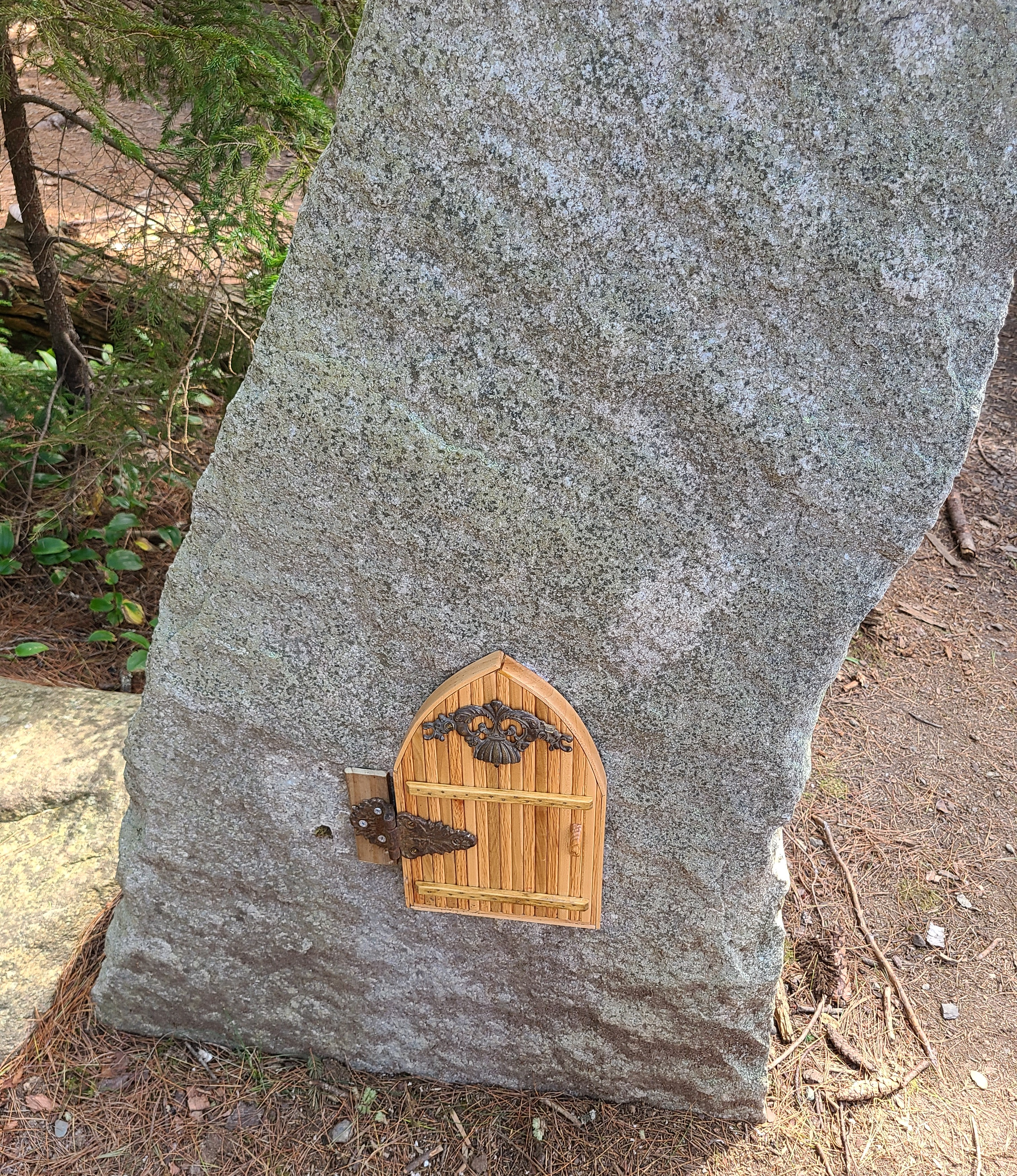
Fairy Door at the Coastal Maine Botanical Gardens

== See also ==
- Fairy Doors of Ann Arbor
- Fairy ring
- False door
