= The Bookstore Mural =

Mural by Richard Wolk in Ann Arbor, Michigan

Coordinates: 42.2793°N 83.7410°W

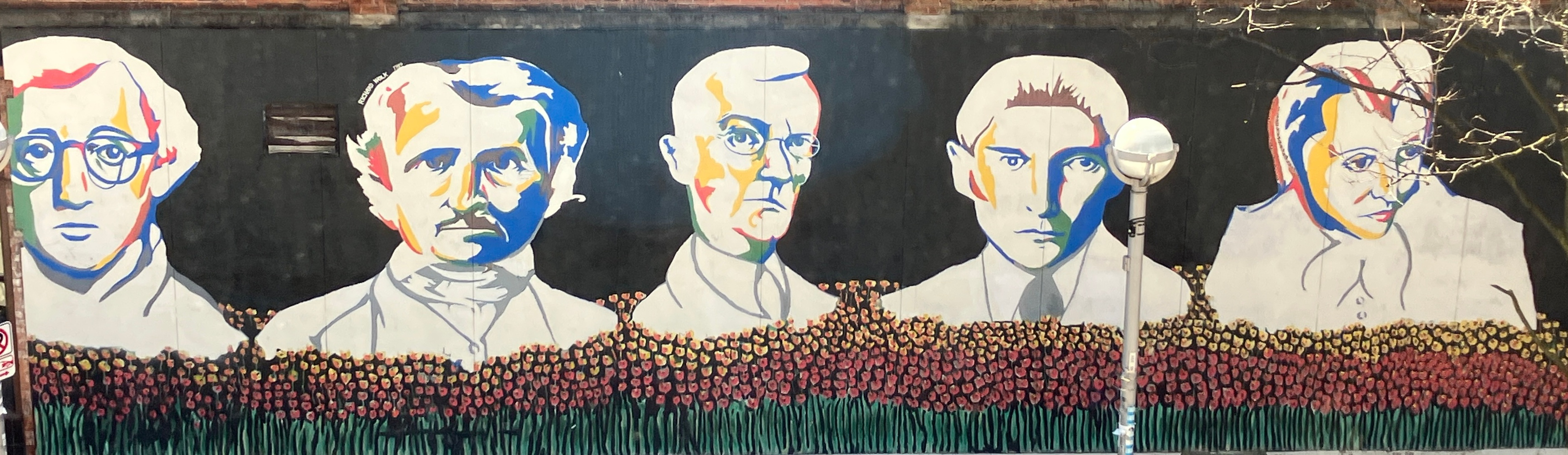

The Bookstore Mural is an outdoor mural by Richard Wolk located on the corner of Liberty Street and State Street in downtown Ann Arbor, Michigan, US. The mural is an Ann Arbor icon, and is one of the city's most well-known pieces of public art. The work, colloquially referred to as the Bookstore Mural, was painted in 1984 by Richard Wolk and was commissioned by David's Books, the building's former occupants. The mural depicts the headshots of Woody Allen, Edgar Allan Poe, Hermann Hesse, Franz Kafka, and Anaïs Nin. It is approximately 60 by 20 feet (18 by 6 m).

== History ==
The bookstore mural was painted on the side of the building at 300 South State Street by Richard Wolk in 1984. It was commissioned by David's Books, the building's occupants at that time. The building has been managed by Oxford Company since 2000. Built in 1901, the property has housed several businesses, including David's Books, the Kenmore Restaurant, and Discount Records, where a young Iggy Pop worked before he moved to Chicago. Potbelly Sandwich Works has occupied the building since 2003.

One of the most notable aspects of the work is that the subjects are not easily identifiable, nor is the name of the piece widely known. This is illustrated by the fact that it is often referred to by different names, including: The Poet Mural, Liberty Street Mural, The Bookstore Mural, and East Liberty Street Wall Mural.

Several news sources, such as the Michigan Daily and AnnArbor.com, choose not to refer to it by any name. A 2010 article by AnnArbor.com detailed how the mural was not collectively named, and whether it should be.

In 2010, the mural gained significant media attention as the original painter, Richard Wolk, was hired to touch it up, 26 years after he originally painted it. The mural was featured in several publications, including the cover of the Ann Arbor Observer, and on official movie posters for the 2011 film, Answer This!.
