= Artrain USA =

Artrain is an organization devoted to promote art and culture. The organization used to operate a traveling art museum on a train, which is no longer in service. It consisted of three gallery cars, with two more cars in support, and traveled widely in the United States, operating in a different region every year. It was intended as a short-lived program but was active for over 30 years due to popular demand.

== History ==
Artrain USA is believed to have been the longest-running special-display train in the United States (the Freedom Trains traveled more widely but were special-purpose exhibitions, first in the late 1940s, and then for the United States Bicentennial celebration in the late 1970s). Though it was intended as a short-lived, statewide program, the Michigan Artrain welcomed 191,000 visitors in 28 cities in the first year, 1971. Soon after, it expanded its focus to nationwide touring.

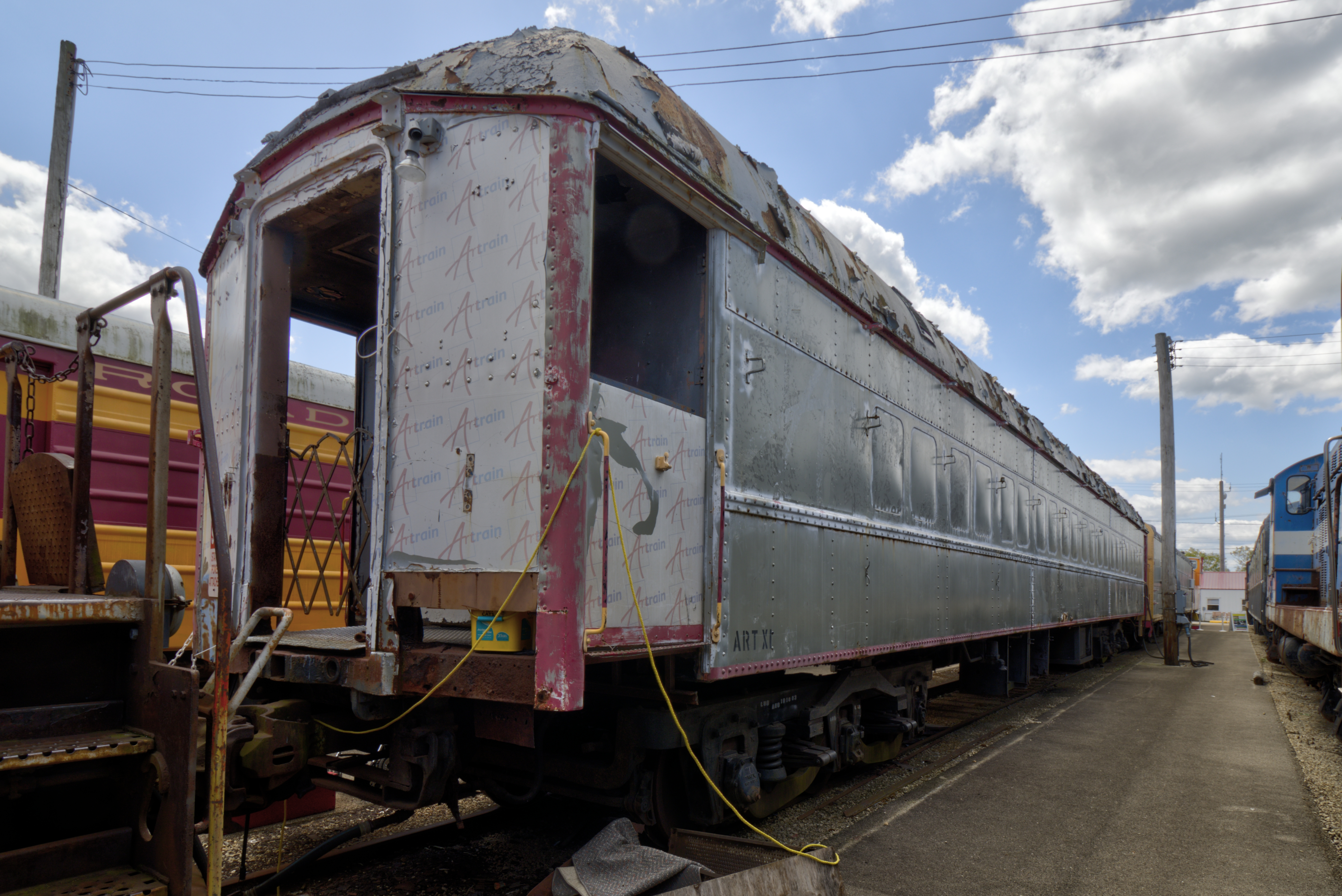
ARTX 1, part of the original Artrain, preserved at Illinois Railway Museum

Artrain began in 1971 as a project of the "Michigan Council for the Arts", (Note: Now known as the "Michigan Council for Arts and Cultural Affairs") and initially toured Michigan, visiting small towns that did not have their own museums. Throughout the summer of 1971 Michigan Artrain toured across the state of Michigan with over 191,000 visitors in 28 Michigan communities visiting the train's vintage baggage car converted to a studio car where 2 resident artists that travelled with the train demonstrated and explained the many different types of art processes and mediums. Soon after, thanks to popular demand, a separate foundation was set up, and the tour area was broadened to the entire United States with the help of the National Endowment for the Arts (NEA). The first tour beyond Michigan commenced in 1973. Since then, it has hosted 15 or more different exhibitions. Funding of about US$1.5 million annually is through private donations and government grants. In addition, significant in-kind support from the railways it travels over helped reduce funding needs. (Note: All 4 Class I railways moved the train for free and provided siding space as needed. Several members of the foundation board are railway officials. The value of this in-kind contribution is considerable.) The name was changed to "Artrain USA" in 1999 to reflect the national mission.

The Artrain USA organization is an independent nonprofit and has headquarters on North Main Street in Ann Arbor, Michigan.

== Exhibits ==
Most works exhibited were paintings, although some computer graphics and three-dimensional art were included. The shock and vibration potential of train travel required that sculptures and other three-dimensional works, especially if they were at all fragile, be transported in protective cases between stops, which increased the setup time enough that an all-sculpture exhibition would be prohibitive.

The train, despite limited space, had a small Operation Lifesaver exhibit to promote railroad safety awareness.

== Operations, visit logistics ==
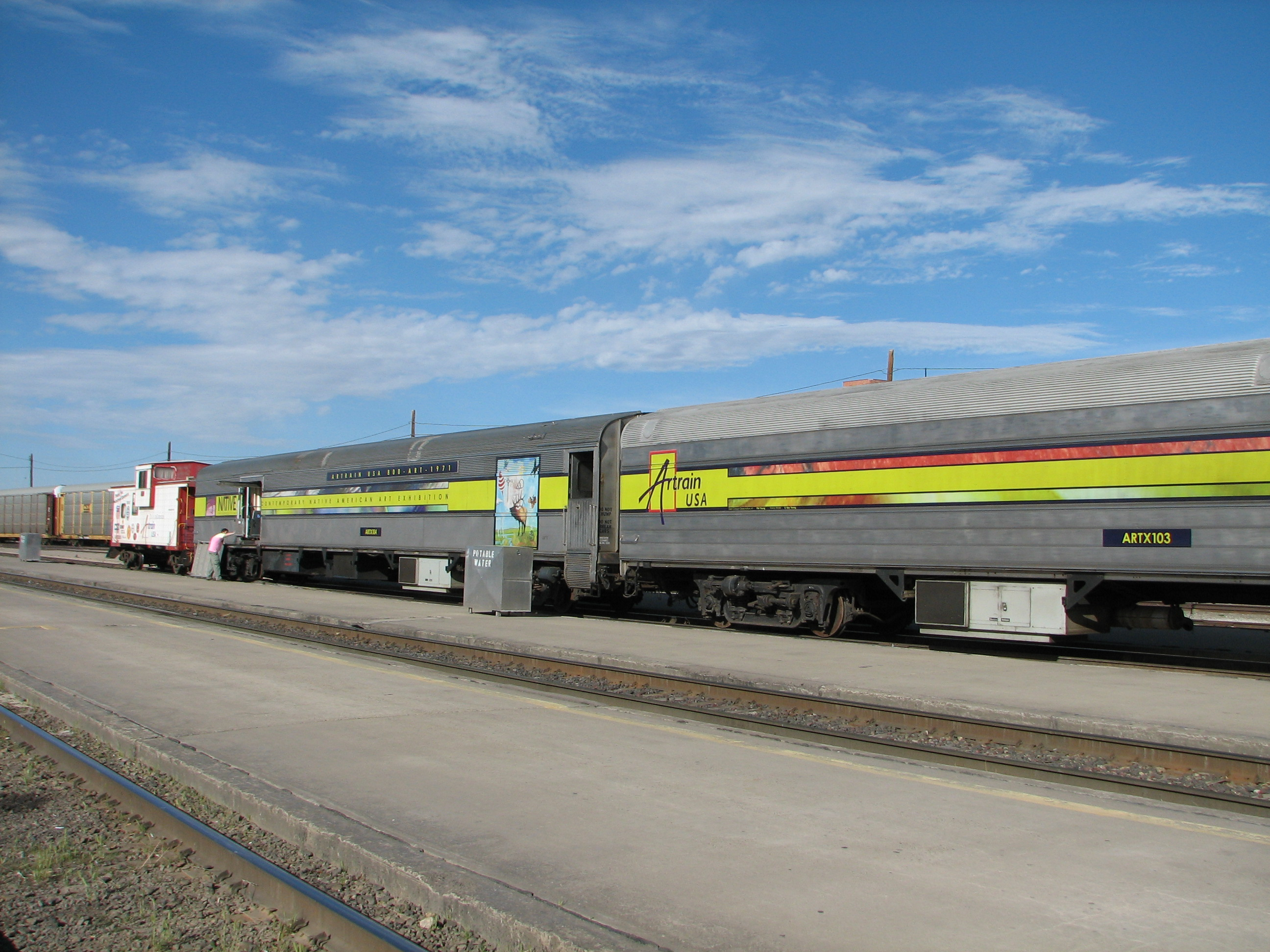
The Artrain in 2006.

Artrain USA toured different regions of the country in different years, cycling through a given region once every four or so years, typically when the exhibition changes. It was on tour 11 months a year, traveling about 12,000 miles per year. In 2006, it operated in the Western United States and in 2007, ran in the Midwest and Deep South. The one month each year that the train was not touring, it was at its home base in Ann Arbor, where the cars underwent maintenance and had exhibits updated or replaced.

Planning (to locate a 450 or more foot long siding that is more or less straight, with road/parking access nearby that does not require crossing active tracks, to secure local volunteers and site prep, and to arrange for publicity) was carried out entirely without a site visit to reduce costs. The headquarters staff provided detailed sponsor and volunteer guidelines, as well as publicity and planning materials, to help the community achieve a successful visit.

=== Rolling stock ===
Artrain USA consisted of several exhibit cars with walk-through galleries (1940s vintage Budd passenger cars, rebuilt to remove windows), a studio/gift shop car in which staff and visiting artists give working demonstrations, and crew quarters, which, as of June 2006, consisted of a caboose but were slated to be changed over to a former New York Central Railroad round-end observation car. The number of exhibit cars was constrained by the total train-length restriction (longer trains require longer sidings, reducing the number of sites that could host the train).

=== Staffing ===
A touring staff traveled with the train. It was divided into a facilities staff concerned with mechanical operation and equipment, and an arts staff. Artrain USA provides fellowships to young artists (most staff members were in their 20s and 30s) willing to travel with the train and demonstrate their talents. The staff also collected tickets—admission was usually free but tickets were used to track attendance. The staff often gave tours to interested railroad personnel as a way to help build understanding of the train's mission and increase service responsiveness.
