= Argus Farm Stop =

Grocery store in Ann Arbor, Michigan

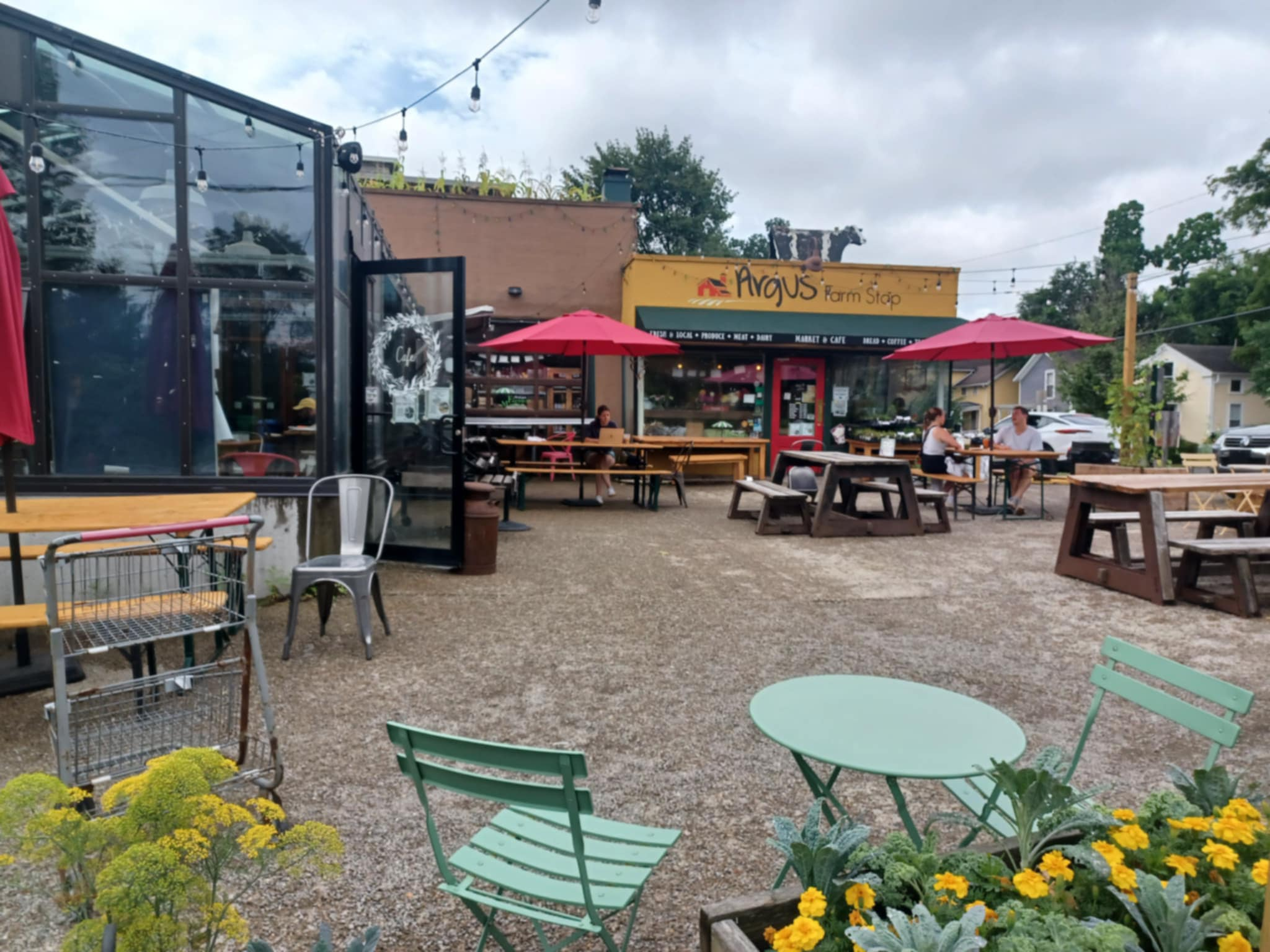
- Founded: August 2014; 11 years ago in Ann Arbor, Michigan, U.S.
- Founders: Kathy Sample; Bill Brinkerhoff
- Headquarters: Ann Arbor, Michigan, U.S.
- Number of locations: 3
- Area served: Ann Arbor, Michigan
- Products: Local produce, meat, dairy, baked goods
- Website: www.argusfarmstop.com

Argus Farm Stop is a grocery store in Ann Arbor, Michigan. The store sells local farm sourced goods and produces, where the farmers set their own prices and receive a share of the sales revenue based on a consignment-based business model. The model has gained national attention as a method for connecting local farms directly with consumers.

== History ==
Argus Farm Stop was founded by Kathy Sample and Bill Brinkerhoff to provide a consistent retail outlet for local farmers, particularly outside the traditional market season. The first store opened in August 2014 in a former gas station on Ann Arbor's west side. The company later expanded, opening a second location with a café on Packard Street in 2017. In 2022 they opened a third location two doors down from the 2nd location on Packard, splitting the grocery store from the café.

During the COVID-19 pandemic, the store expanded its online ordering and pickup services to meet a surge in demand when their business almost doubled.

== Impact and recognition ==
Argus Farm Stop has been noted for its local-first model offering a "hybrid between a farmers' market and a grocery store." In 2024 alone, the store generated nearly $7 million in gross sales across its location. Through its consignment-based business model, of the total sales in 2024, Argus paid out $4.4 million to farms and food producers, with a profit margin of around 1.8 percent.

The model provides a significant revenue stream for small and medium-sized farms, enabling some to expand their operations. In 2024, to encourage adoption of its business model, Argus hosted the first National Farm Stop Conference in Ann Arbor. The three-day conference hosted over 130 attendees from across the country.
