= The Ark (folk venue) =

Coordinates: 42°16′45″N 83°44′56″W

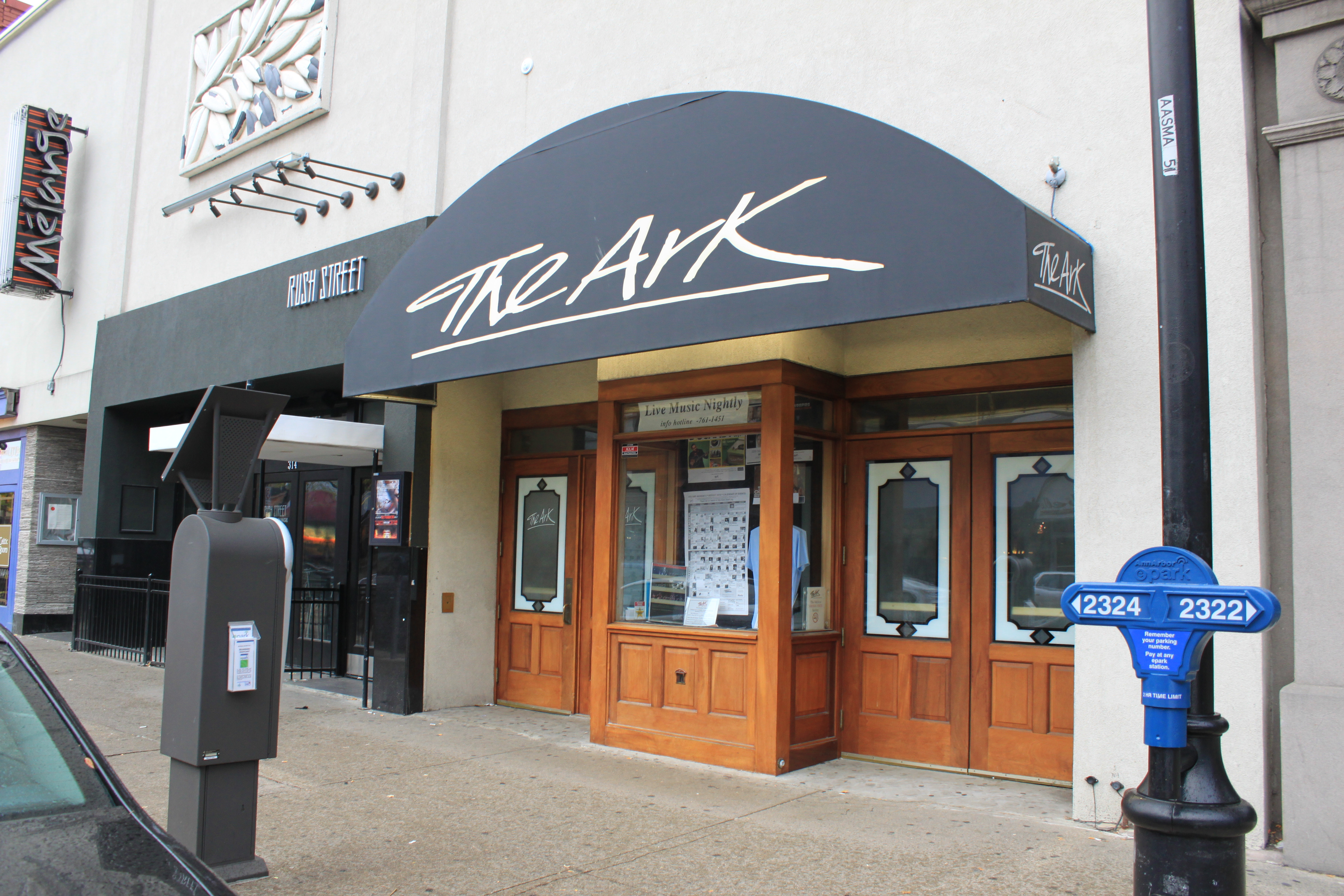
- Interactive map of The Ark
- Location: 316 S. Main Street, Ann Arbor, Michigan, U.S.A.
- Owner: 501(c)(3) nonprofit organization
- Capacity: ~400

Construction
- Opened: 1965

Website
- theark.org

The Ark, in Ann Arbor, Michigan, is a nationally known acoustic and folk music venue. It has been in existence in various locations since 1965. It currently seats about 400 and features more than 300 live performances each year.

Artists who have performed at The Ark include The Motels, Peter Wolf, John Oates, Colin Hay, Duncan Sheik, Marshall Crenshaw, The Tallest Man on Earth, Lady Lamb, the Verve Pipe, John Paul White and His Band, Los Lonely Boys, the Milk Carton Kids, Nanci Griffith, Mary Chapin Carpenter, Priscilla Ahn, Tom Paxton, Judy Collins, Arlo Guthrie, The Avett Brothers, Ani DiFranco, Birds of Chicago, The Proclaimers, Mandolin Orange, Ladysmith Black Mambazo, and Lissie.

The improv comedy group The Second City has performed there as well.
