= Ypsilanti Historical Society =

Historical society in Michigan, U.S.

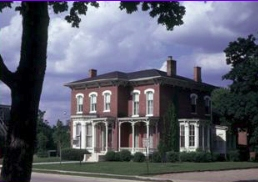
- Established: 1961
- Location: 220 N Huron St, Ypsilanti, Michigan 48197
- Coordinates: 42.244705°N 83.612685°W
- President: Bill Nickels
- Website: www.ypsihistory.org

The Ypsilanti Historical Society (YHS), founded in 1961, operates the Ypsilanti Historical Museum and Rudisill-Fletcher-White Archives in Ypsilanti, Michigan, United States. The YHS Museum & Archives are located at 220 North Huron Street in the Historic 1860 Dow House, a Victorian Italianate mansion built in 1860 for Asa and Minerva Dow. Asa Dow moved to Ypsilanti to become the first president of the Ypsilanti Savings Bank. In 1864, Minerva died under unknown circumstances, and Asa sold the home and moved back to Chicago. Minerva Dow was the second person interred at Ypsilanti's newly constructed Highland Cemetery.

The house came into possession of the Ypsilanti Historical Society in 1970 after previously being owned by the City of Ypsilanti since 1966. The City purchased the property and other stately homes on the east side of North Huron Street with the design to turn the location into a Ypsilanti version of neighboring Ann Arbor's successful Arborland shopping center. Local community members boycotted the effort and the event served as the impetus for the creation of the Ypsilanti Historic District. Prior to 1966 the house was in disrepair, as the home had been turned into at least six apartments since 1922. In 2007 the Fletcher-White Archives (now the Rudisill-Fletcher-White Archives, being renamed after former YHS President and influential Ypsilantian Alvin Rudisill who spearheaded funding for the Archives) moved from the property's two-story carriage house into the newly renovated basement of the main house.

The Rudisill-Fletcher-White Archives contains a meeting space, a reading room, filing cabinets for document and photograph storage, and a temperature and humidity-controlled storage room. Much of the collections of the YHS Archives are the work product of former Ypsilanti City Historians Louis S. White and Foster Fletcher. The position of Ypsilanti City Historian was discontinued with the retirement of Foster Fletcher and the City of Ypsilanti Archives were transferred from their location at the Downtown Ypsilanti Public Library on Michigan Avenue to the Ypsilanti Historical Society, which has continually grown the collection since.

Different rooms of the Historic 1860 Dow House are displayed like a traditional house museum, with a parlor circa 1880s and a sitting room circa late 1920s. It also includes a dining room, early twentieth century kitchen, second floor bedroom, a solarium original to the house with a slatted floor for watering plants and a roof vent to adjust the plants' temperature, and a library with a New York City made Tiffany Studios (a separate company from the related Tiffany & Co.) stained glass window originally from the Starkweather Ladies Library building just south on North Huron Street.

The Rudisill-Fletcher-White Archives includes collections on Ypsilanti City and Township history, Eastern Michigan University, the Willow Run Bomber Plant, Lincoln Consolidated Schools, and Ypsilanti Community Schools. Among the holdings are family Bibles, maps and atlases, city and county directories, postcards, yearbooks, many Ypsilanti and neighboring community obituaries, news clippings, Ypsilanti newspapers on microfilm, tax assessment rolls, and civil and criminal dockets. Through collaboration with the University of Michigan Library's Digital Library Production Service, the Ypsilanti Historical Society Photo Archives has made over 17,500 Ypsilanti-related digitized photographs available to the public online.

The Ypsilanti Historical Museum is a member of the MotorCities National Heritage Area.

The Society's quarterly publication, Ypsilanti Gleanings, has been published since 1973. It was awarded the 2009 State History Award for "Communications: Newsletters and Websites" by the Historical Society of Michigan. The publication is available digitally and word searchable on the Internet Archive and the Ypsilanti Historical Society website.

== See also ==
- List of historical societies in Michigan
