= Martha Washington Theatre =

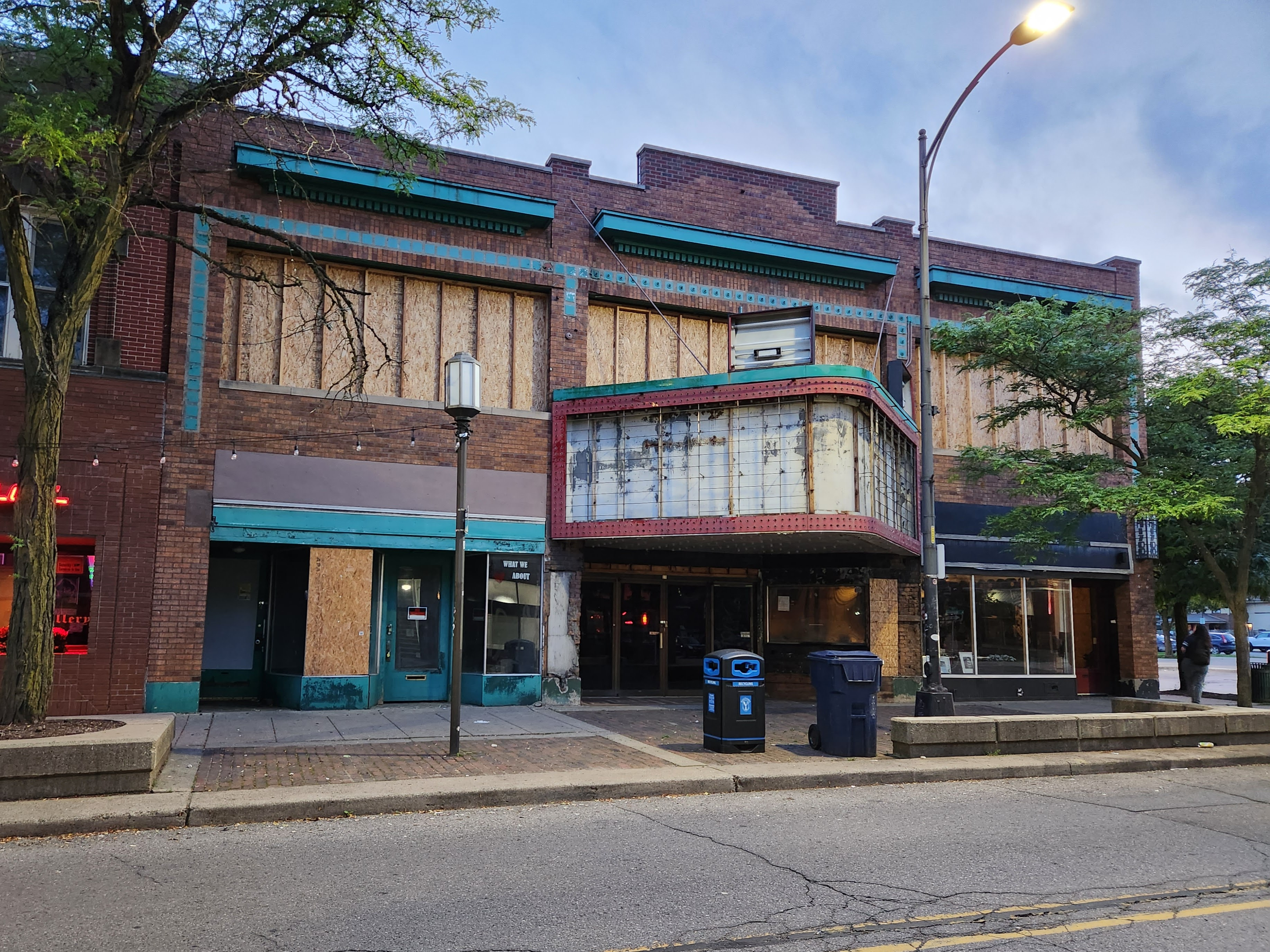
- Photographed in 2023, in the midst of a renovation project
- Interactive map of Martha Washington Theatre
- Address: 31 North Washington Street; Ypsilanti, Michigan; United States
- Coordinates: 42°14′31.4″N 83°36′52.5″W

Construction
- Opened: October 21, 1915; 110 years ago
- Martha Washington Theater Building
- U.S. Historic district – Contributing property
- Part of: Ypsilanti Historic District (ID78001515)
- Added to NRHP: April 11, 1978

The Martha Washington Theatre is a former movie theater in Ypsilanti, Michigan. The Martha Washington was built and initially operated by Florence W. Signor of Ypsilanti, the only woman theatre operator in Michigan at the time. Signor sold the Martha Washington to W. S. Butterfield Theatres in 1925, which operated it as a first-run cinema until the 1970s.

After it ceased operation under W. S. Butterfield Theatres, the theatre became the Art 1&2 adult theater, which was later converted to the Déjà Vu Showgirls club. Déjà Vu closed in March 2020 due to the COVID-19 pandemic, and the building was damaged by a fire in July 2020.

== Movie theatre era ==
The Martha Washington Theatre was the second purpose-built movie theatre in Ypsilanti. The first was the Vaudette at 19 North Huron Street, which opened in 1907 in a former grocery store. The local press criticized the safety of the 40-seat Vaudette after fires at similar theatres, and it closed around 1912.

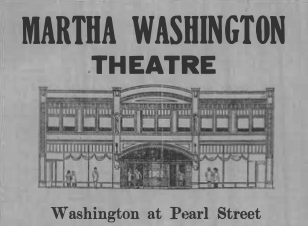
Line drawing of the theatre, 1915

The Martha Washington Theatre was built for Florence Wilson Signor, a leading women's suffrage activist in early 20th-century Washtenaw County. Signor was a founder of the Ann Arbor Equal Suffrage Association, which held its first meeting in 1910. Beyond her activities in suffrage, Signor was also engaged in real estate development.

When construction started, the cost was quoted at $25,000 (equivalent to $796,000 in 2025), and the theatre was originally planned to seat 500. After the theatre's opening, its seating capacity was quoted as 800. The exterior features a decorative tile facade and a distinctive ribbon of windows on the second floor, variously described as Prairie style or Colonial Revival. The Martha Washington was purpose-built as a cinema, and was intended to be a luxurious experience. The interior featured plush blue seats, with decorations in light blue and pink and bas-relief images of its namesake throughout the building.

The Martha Washington Theatre opened on October 21, 1915. The first film shown was The Island of Regeneration, a Vitagraph picture starring Edith Storey. At its opening, the Martha Washington Theatre was touted in advertisements as "Ypsilanti's Most Sanitary, Properly Lighted, Well Ventilated, Prettily Decorated, and Fire-Proof Theatre."

Signor's sole ownership and management of the theatre was unusual. An editorial published by the Martha Washington projectionist opined: "And I think I have about one of the best managers in the state, as she, — well, she is a lady, which expresses a lot in a few words." Moving Picture World described Signor as the "only remaining woman theatre manager in Michigan" in 1925.

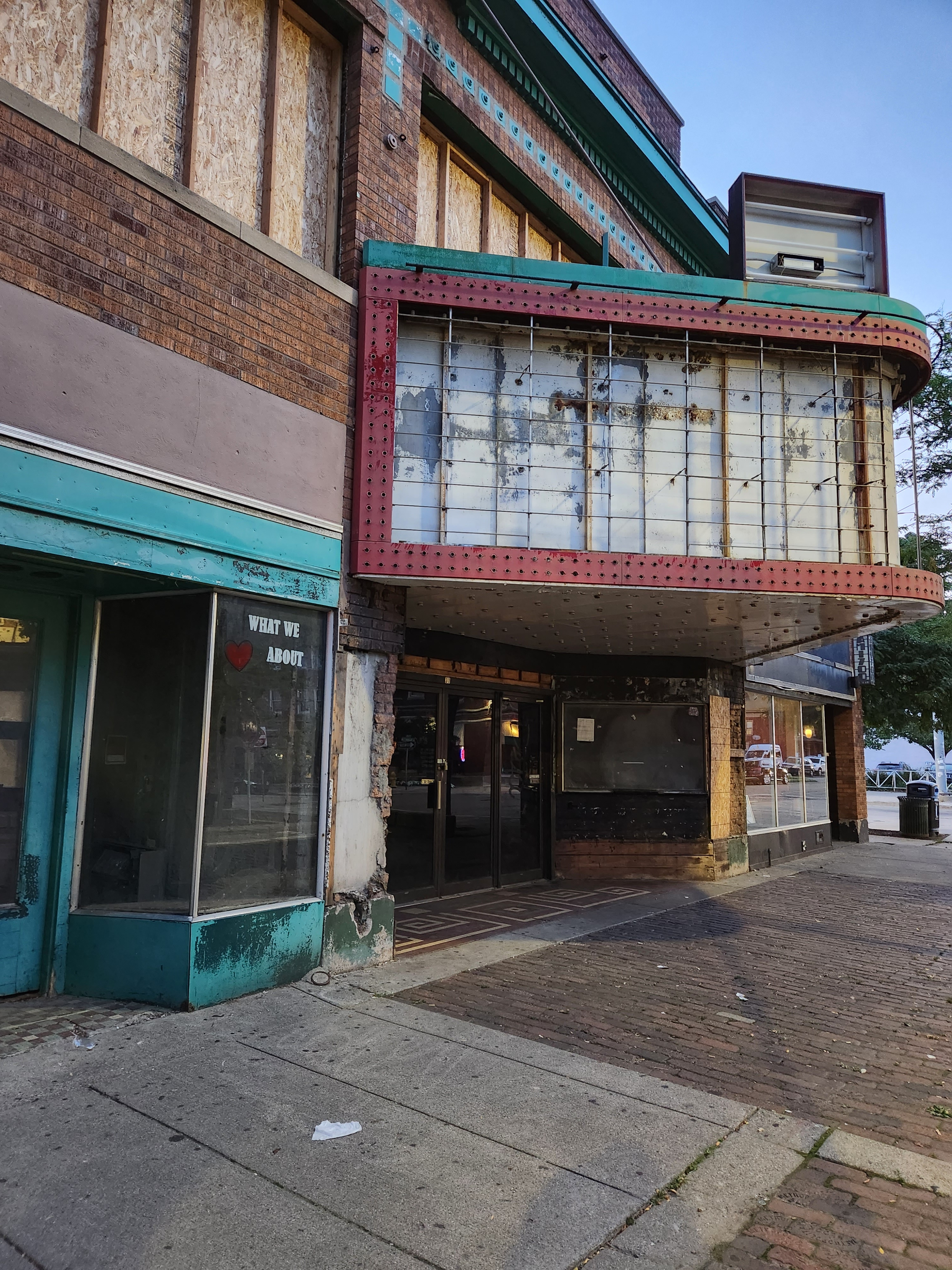
Detail of the marquee, July 2023

Signor entered into a distribution agreement with First National Pictures in 1920, and eventually sold the theatre to W. S. Butterfield Theatres in April 1925. That year, Butterfield bought out the nearby Wuerth Theatre, and gained a near-monopoly on the Ann Arbor and Ypsilanti cinema market. In the 1940s, the Martha Washington was the Ypsilanti area's premier theatre, receiving the newest pictures and charging higher prices.

Florence Wilson Signor died in 1942 in Bradenton, Florida. She is buried at the Highland Cemetery in Ypsilanti.

== Adult entertainment era ==
The theatre experienced a decline in fortune in the mid-20th century, and Butterfield was no longer in control of the theatre by the early 1970s. Initially, the "MARTHA" sign on the marquee was hastily converted to read "ART 1." The auditorium was split in two soon after, and became the "Art 1 & 2" adult theatre.

The theatre became the Déjà Vu Showgirls strip club in 1982. After its opening, the City of Ypsilanti changed the zoning in the area to prohibit adult businesses. The club was grandfathered in under the principle of "nonconforming use," which allowed the club to continue operating, but not expand.

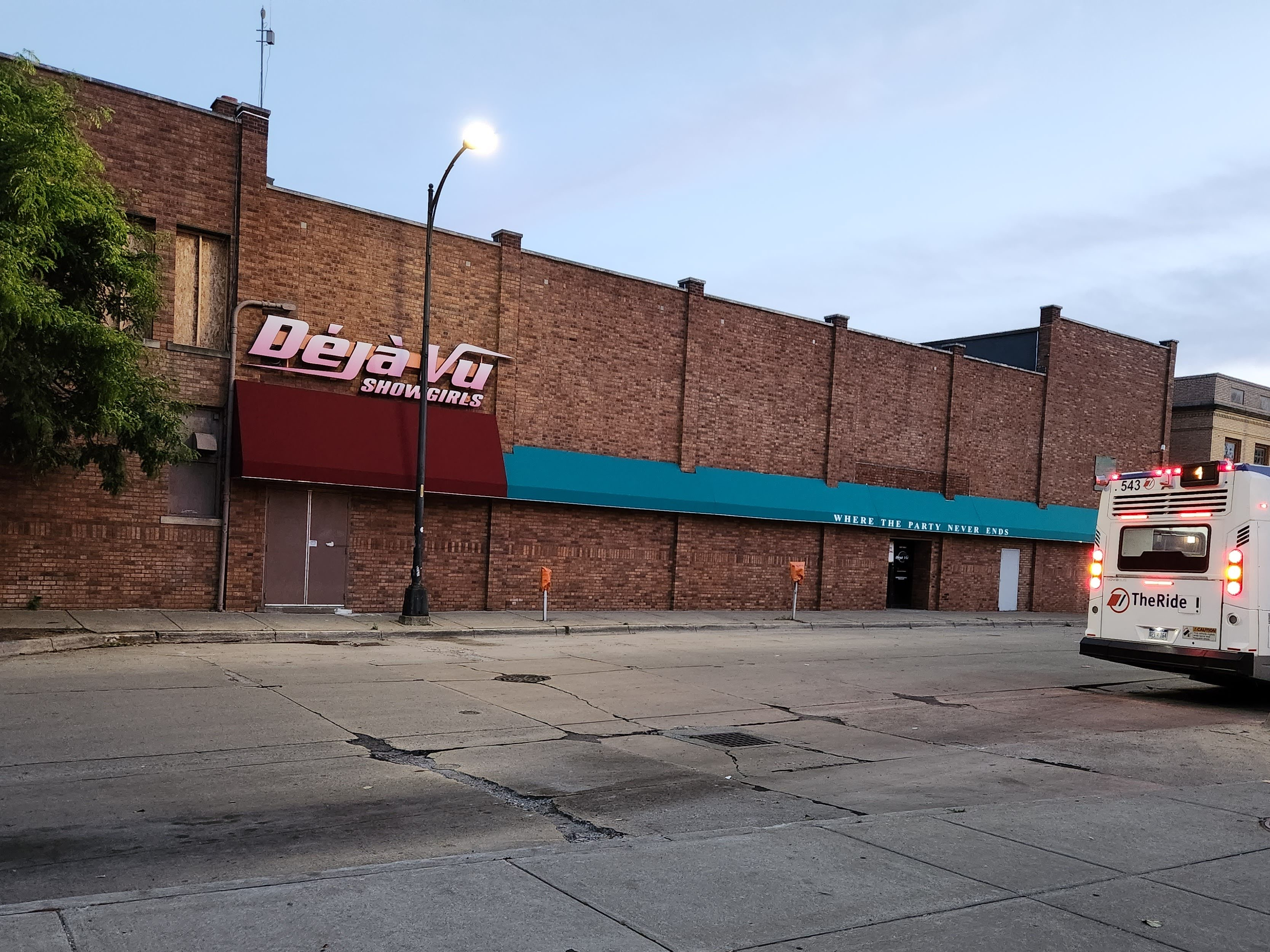
View of the former theater from Pearl St, adjacent to the Ypsilanti Transit Center

In late 2019, a dispute arose between the City of Ypsilanti and the club. The city alleged that the club had expanded its business without the necessary construction permits, and was in violation of zoning laws. The club was ordered to close in March 2020 in response to the COVID-19 pandemic, and the building was damaged by a major fire in July 2020.

Multiple lawsuits were filed by the city and the club over the course of over two years, causing controversy among Ypsilanti city officials and residents. The lawsuits ended with a settlement in late 2022, which resulted in a payment of $65,000 to the city.

== Reopening after renovations ==
The Deja Vu Showgirls club reopened, following a renovation. Under the terms of the settlement, the club must convert parts of the building to apartments and retail space, restore the historic marquee, and remove some slogans from the exterior of the building. The club had its soft re-reopening on March 1, 2024 and a grand re-opening on April 17.
