= Michigan Firehouse Museum =

Michigan Firehouse Museum and Education Center
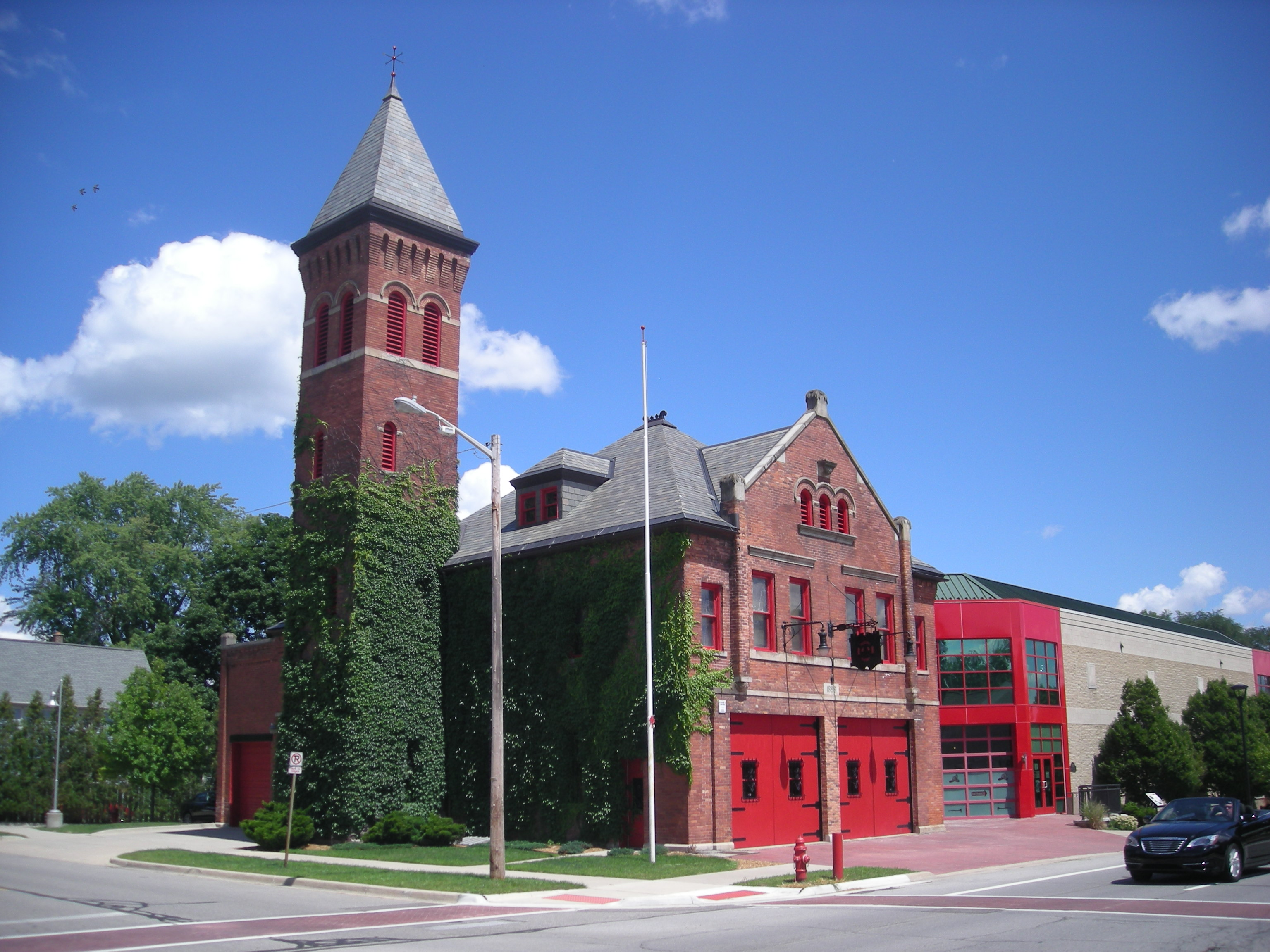
- Exterior of the 1898 fire station

- Location within Michigan
- Established: 1998
- Location: 110 West Cross Street, Ypsilanti, Michigan, US
- Coordinates: 42°14′46″N 83°36′51″W
- Type: Fire museum
- Visitors: 6,000 (annually)
- Website: www.michiganfirehousemuseum.org
- Ypsilanti Fire Station
- U.S. Historic district – Contributing property
- Built: 1898
- Architectural style: Romanesque Revival
- Part of: Ypsilanti Historic District (ID78001515)
- Added to NRHP: April 11, 1978

The Michigan Firehouse Museum and Education Center is a fire museum dedicated to the history of firefighting in the U.S. state of Michigan. It incorporates the former Ypsilanti Fire Station, a Romanesque Revival-style fire station built in 1898. The museum is located at 110 West Cross Street in Ypsilanti, Michigan.

== History ==
The Michigan Firehouse Museum is located in Ypsilanti's former fire station, which was built adjacent to the city's Depot Town neighborhood in 1898 and remained in service until 1975. That year, the city built a new station and sold the old one to a family who lived in the building. In 1998, the old station was purchased by Ann Arborites Howard and Norma Weaver, who then opened the museum that same year.

The Michigan Firehouse Museum and Education Center was incorporated as a 501(c)(3) non-profit organization in 1999. In 2005, it was the only fire museum in the state open year-round, as well as the closest one to Metro Detroit.

The present museum consists of the former fire station as well as a modern, multilevel addition, that together combine for a total of 26,000 square feet (2,400 m^{2}). The addition was built in 2002.

The museum is a component of the MotorCities National Heritage Area, which has grant-funded a mortar-restoration project on the original fire station's brick exterior.

== Exhibits ==
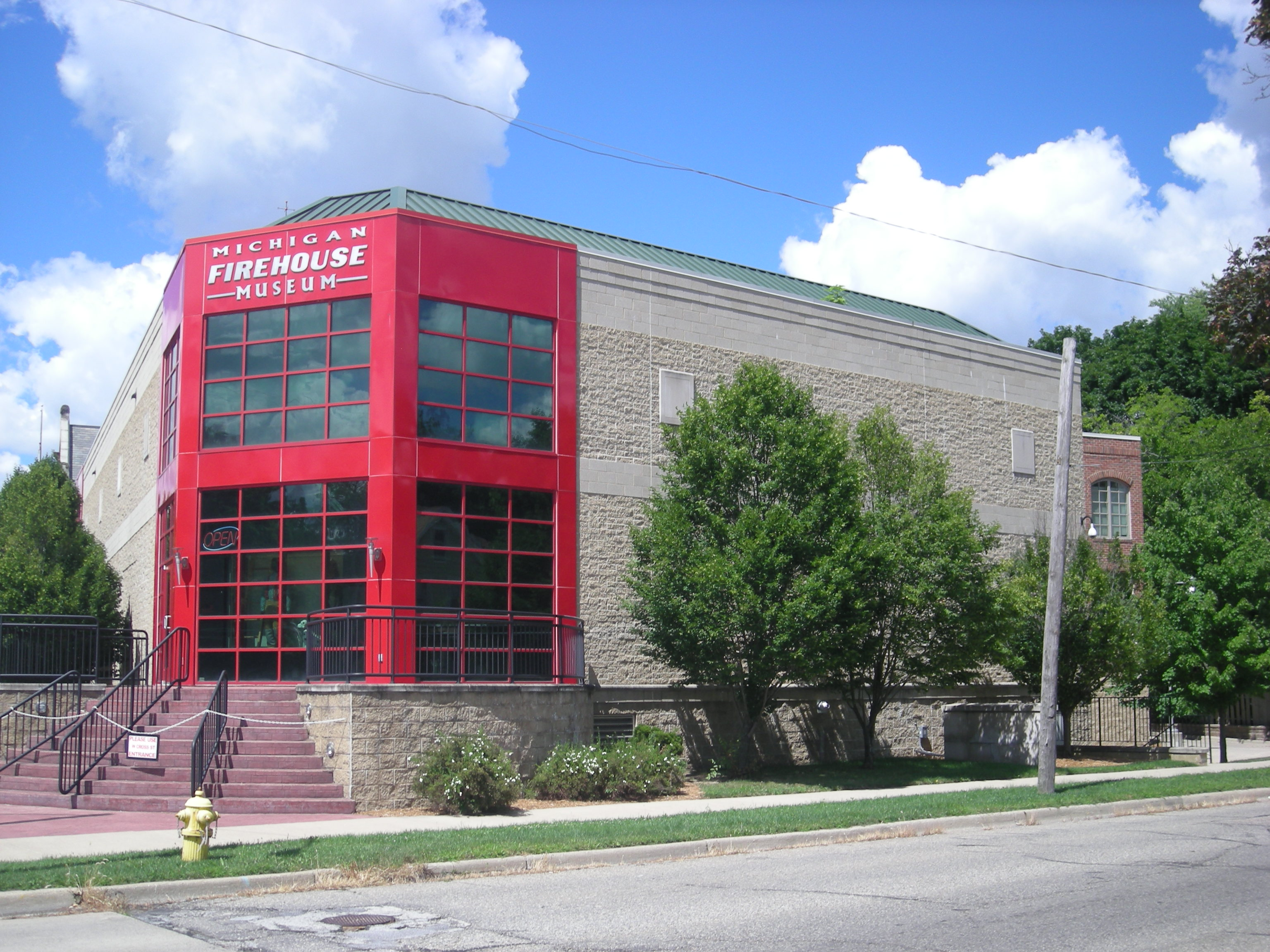
Exterior of the 2002 addition

The Michigan Firehouse Museum's exhibits focus on the history of fire fighting technology and fire fighting in Michigan. The museum collects, restores, and displays firefighting equipment from around the state, in addition to a number of archival materials. The modern addition to the Michigan Firehouse Museum provides space for an extensive number of changing exhibits highlighting the history of firefighting, which include antique fire trucks, equipment, and tools as well as firefighting memorabilia. The original fire station showcases a horse-drawn steam-powered fire engine. The museum also displays a number of interactive exhibits to educate and engage visitors with fire safety.

The museum is home to fire trucks from across the state, including those from Ann Arbor, Battle Creek, Escanaba, Grand Rapids, Hubbard Lake, Kalamazoo, Saline, Scio Township, and Ypsilanti. Highlights from the truck collection include a 1916 Triple Combination Pumper and a 1917 American LaFrance Type 31. By 2005, the museum had acquired over 15 fire trucks, and by 2007 its collection had grown to more than 20 trucks. In 2021, the Michigan Firehouse Museum acquired a 1927 American LaFrance truck formerly used by the Ann Arbor Fire Department.

The museum is home to the largest collection of fire truck bells in the United States. It has a total of over 3,600 items on display, including rare fire grenades.

== Visitors and events ==
The museum draws approximately 6,000 visitors annually. Its visitors include numerous schoolchildren, Boy Scouts, and former firefighters, and the museum has welcomed visitors from other fire museums across the nation.

In 2018, then-museum director Al Dyer Jr. opined that the museum was underutilized, as it was open to visitors only 16 hours per week. He also voiced his desire to develop relationships between the museum and other organizations and institutions in the community, especially Eastern Michigan University. The museum has since furthered its efforts to establish itself as an education center for fire safety, as well as a unique venue for weddings, birthday parties, receptions, and other events. The museum has been hosting such events since 2005.

Since August 2010, the museum has hosted an annual Firetruck Muster, a fire truck show, at Riverside Park in Ypsilanti. In December 2018, the fire station, which is considered haunted by some paranormal investigators, hosted its inaugural Para-Con paranormal convention, featuring multiple panel discussions and a midnight ghost hunt.
