= John Burton (mayor) =

American politician (1910–1992)

John H. Burton
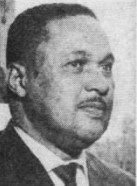

Mayor of Ypsilanti
- In office 1967–1968
- Preceded by: Susan H. Sayre
- Succeeded by: Timothy J. Dyer

Member of the Ypsilanti City Council
- In office 1947–1967

Personal details
- Born: July 18, 1910 St. Louis, Missouri
- Died: January 30, 1992 (age 81)
- Spouse: Willie Vaugh
- Education: B.A. Stowes Teachers College

John H. Burton (July 18, 1910 – January 30, 1992) was an American politician who served as the first African-American mayor of Ypsilanti.

== Biography ==
Burton was born in St. Louis, Missouri on July 18, 1910, the son of Dahlia and George Burton. He graduated with a B.A. from Stowes Teachers College in St. Louis. In 1936, he moved to Ypsilanti. In 1947, he was elected to the Ypsilanti City Council where he served as a councilmember in 18 of the 20 years through 1967. In 1954, he was named to the staff of the International UAW by Walter Reuther and then served as the Political Action Committee Coordinator to the 1st and 13th Congressional Districts. In 1967, he was elected by the City Council as Mayor of Ypsilanti succeeding the city's first female mayor, Susan H. Sayre. He was the city's first African-American mayor and one of three Black mayors elected in Michigan in 1967 (along with Henry G. Marsh, mayor of Saginaw; and Floyd J. McCree, mayor of Flint). He served one term until 1968 when the council elected Timothy J. Dyer as his successor.

In 1985, Burton was named to Board of Regents for Eastern Michigan University and elected chairman in 1989. He received the UAW Douglas A. Fraser Community Services Common Swift Award, the Civic Humanitarian of the Year Award from Eastern Michigan University, and the Distinguished Service Award from the Greater Ypsilanti Area Chamber of Commerce.

== Personal life ==
On April 2, 1939, he married Willie Vaugh. Burton died in January 1992 at the age of 81.

He was a brother of the Sigma Rho chapter of Omega Psi Phi fraternity.

== See also ==
- List of first African-American mayors
