= Leelanau Historical Society and Museum =

Coordinates: 45.0215°N 85.7591°W

The Leelanau Historical Society and Museum is located at 203 E Cedar Street in Leland, Michigan, on the banks of the Leland River and two blocks from historic Fishtown and Lake Michigan. The museum's exhibits reflect the cultural history of the Leelanau Peninsula and its islands from the time of first human habitation to later settlement and development. Exhibits pertain to Shipwrecks of the Manitou Passage, Fur Trading, Early Tourism & Recreation in the region. Another permanent exhibit displays traditional Anishinaabe black ash baskets and quillwork on birch bark, which are primarily the work of the Odawa artists. The museum also houses archives of local history and collections of objects that represent the diverse cultures of Leelanau, including Anishinaabe traditional arts. A free online archive, available to the public, for research covers over 14,000 Leelanau County artifacts, photographs, maps, documents, and artwork.

== See also ==
- List of historical societies in Michigan
