= List of historical societies in Michigan =

The following is a list of historical societies in the state of Michigan, United States.

1887 publication of the Muskegon County Pioneer and Historical Society, Michigan

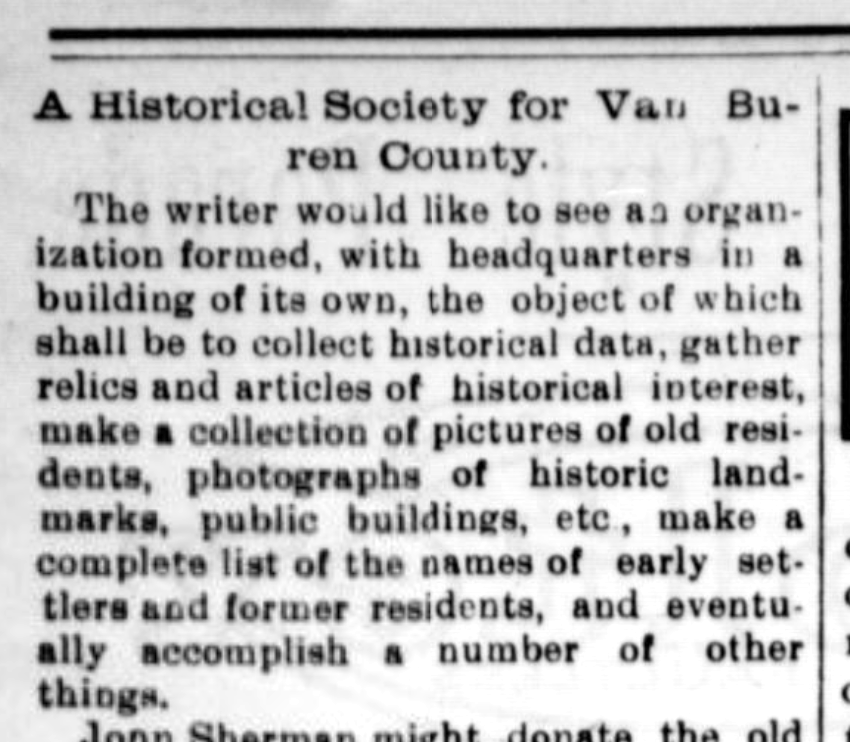
1907 newspaper item about the formation of an historical society in Van Buren County, Michigan

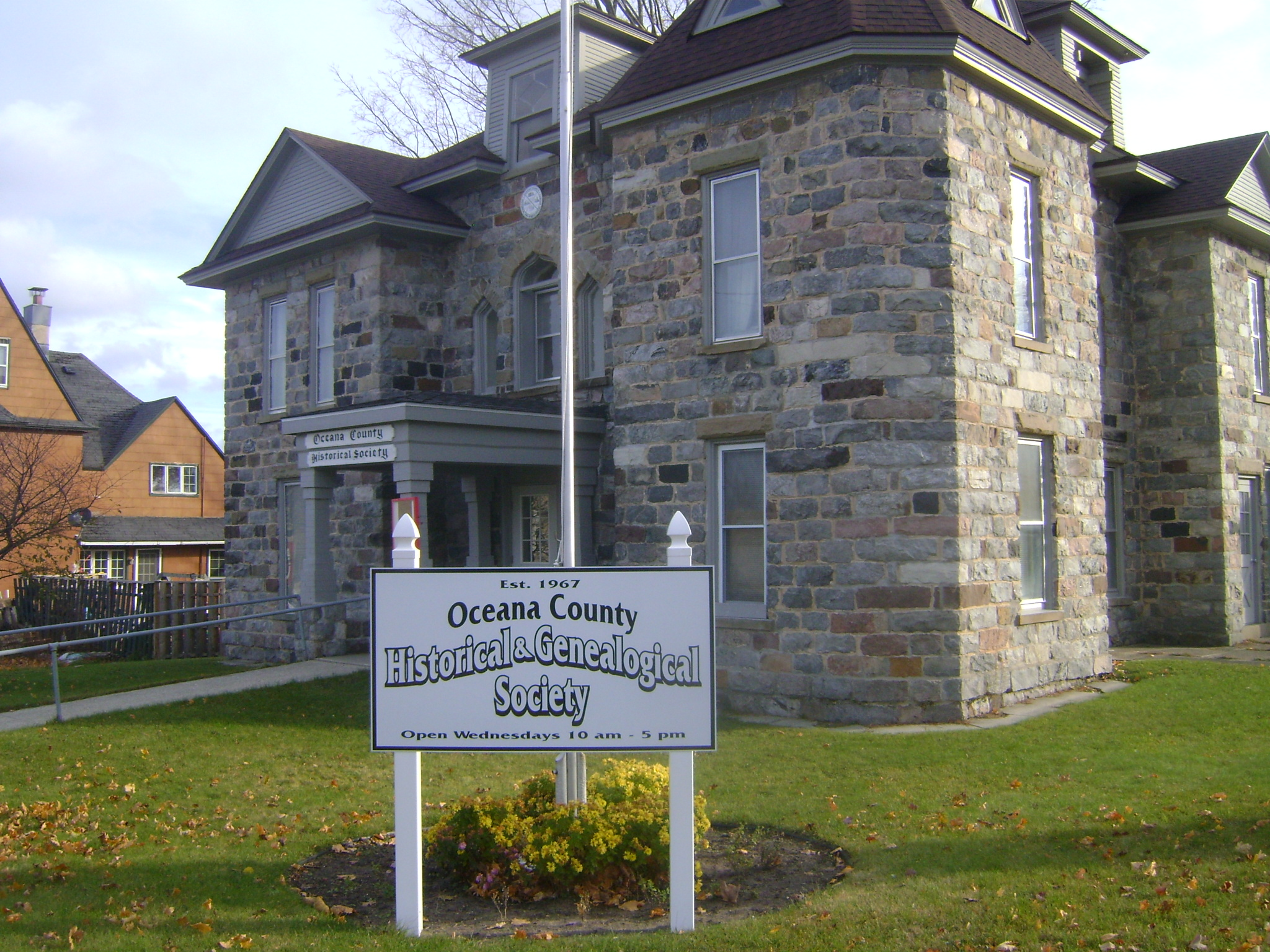
Oceana County Historical Society building, Michigan (photo 2014)

== Organizations ==
- Ada Historical Society
- Albion Historical Society
- Alcona Historical Society
- Alfred Noble Historical Society
- Alger County Historical Society
- Algoma Township Historical Society
- Algonac Clay Township Historical Society
- Allegan County Historical Society
- Allendale Historical Society
- Almira Historical Society
- Aloha Historical Society
- Arcadia Area Historical Society
- Arenac County Historical Society
- Arvon Township Historical Society
- Athens Area Historical Society
- Bad Axe Historical Society
- Bangor Historical Society
- Baraga County Historical Society
- Barry County Historical Society
- Bay County Historical Society
- Bean Creek Valley Historical Society
- Beaver Island Historical Society
- Bedford Historical Society
- Beechwood Historical Society
- Bellaire Area Historical Society
- Bellevue Area Historical Society
- Benzie Area Historical Society
- Benzie Area Historical Society
- Bernard Historical Society
- Berrien County Historical Association
- Bessemer Area Historical Society
- Bloomfield Historical Society
- Bois Blanc Island Historical Society
- Boston-Saranac Historical Society
- Branch County Historical Society
- Breckenridge-Wheeler Area Historical Society
- Historical Society of Bridgeport
- Brighton Area Historical Society
- Byron Center Historical Society
- Cannon Township Historical Society
- Canton Historical Society
- Capac Community Historical Society
- Cascade Historical Society
- Historical Society of Caseville
- Cedar Springs Historical Society
- Historical Society of Center Line
- Central Lake Area Historical Society
- Charlevoix Historical Society
- Chelsea Area Historical Society
- Chesaning Area Historical Society
- Chesterfield Historical Society
- Chippewa County Historical Society
- Historical Society of Clinton
- Clinton County Historical Society
- Columbiaville Historical Society
- Community Historical Society of Colon
- Coopersville Area Historical Society
- Copper Range Historical Society
- Crawford County Historical Society
- Crystal Township Historical Society
- Davison Area Historical Society
- Delta County Historical Society
- Detroit Historical Society
- Dexter Area Historical Society
- Ecorse Historical Society
- Elk Rapids Area Historical Society
- Elkton Area Historical Society
- Engadine Historical Society
- Fallasburg Historical Society
- Farwell Area Historical Society
- Fenton Historical Society
- Ferndale Historical Society
- Fife Lake Historical Society
- Flat River Historical Society
- Flat Rock Historical Society
- Flushing Area Historical Society
- Fraser Historical Society
- Friends of the Plymouth Historical Society
- Genesee County Historical Society
- Gladwin County Historical Society
- Governor John S. Barry Historical Society
- Grand Ledge Area Historical Society
- Grand Marais Historical Society
- Grand Rapids Historical Society
- Great Lakes Shipwreck Historical Society
- Greater Washington Area Historical Society
- Greater West Bloomfield Historical Society
- Green Oak Township Historical Society
- Greenbush Historical Society
- Grosse Ile Historical Society
- Grosse Pointe Historical Society
- Hadley Township Historical Society
- Harbor Springs Area Historical Society
- Harsens Island St. Clair Flats Historical Society
- Holland Area Historical Society
- Holly Historical Society
- Homer Historical Society
- Houghton County Historical Society (est. 1961)
- Howell Area Historical Society (formerly Livingston County Historical Society)
- Huron County Historical Society
- Huron Township Historical Society
- Inland Water Route Historical Society
- Ionia County Historical Society
- Iosco County Historical Society
- Ironwood Area Historical Society
- Isabella County Historical Society
- Ishpeming Area Historical Society
- Jewish Historical Society of Michigan
- Kalamazoo County Historical Society
- Kaleva Historical Society
- Keweenaw Historical Society (1912-1962)
- Keweenaw County Historical Society (est. 1981)
- Lake County Historical Society
- Lake Odessa Area Historical Society
- Historical Society of Greater Lansing
- Lapeer County Historical Society
- Lathrup Village Historical Society
- Leelanau Historical Society
- Lenawee County Historical Society
- Lenox-New Haven Historical Society
- Leslie Area Historical Society
- Lewiston Area Historical Society
- Lincoln Park Historical Society
- Lovells Township Historical Society
- Luce County Historical Society
- Mackinaw Area Historical Society
- Macomb County Historical Society
- Mancelona Historical Society
- Marenisco Township Historical Society
- Marilla Historical Society
- Historical Society of Marine City
- Marlette Historical Society
- Marquette County Historical Society
- Mason Area Historical Society
- Mason County Historical Society
- Mecosta County Historical Society
- Menominee County Historical Society
- Historical Society of Michigan
- Michigan Military Technical & Historical Society
- Michilimackinac Historical Society
- Midland County Historical Society
- Mid-Michigan Railway Historical Society
- Milan Area Historical Society
- Milford Historical Society
- Millersburg Area Historical Society
- Millington-Arbela Historical Society
- Montmorency County Historical Society
- Muskegon County Historical Society
- Muskegon County Pioneer and Historical Society (est. 1880s)
- Nashville Michigan Historical Society
- Negaunee Historical Society
- New Baltimore Historical Society
- Newton Township Historical Society
- North Berrien Historical Society
- Northville Historical Society
- Norwegian Lutheran Church Historical Society
- Norwood Area Historical Society
- Oakland County Pioneer and Historical Society
- Oakland Township Historical Society
- Ogemaw Historical Society
- Olive Township Historical Society
- Omena Historical Society
- Ontonagon County Historical Society
- Orion Historical Society
- Ortonville Community Historical Society
- Oshtemo Historical Society
- Otsego Area Historical Society
- Otsego County Historical Society
- Ovid Historical Society
- Pentwater Historical Society
- Pickford Area Historical Society
- Pigeon Historical Society
- Pioneer Society of the State of Michigan
- Pittsfield Township Historical Society
- Port Austin Area Historical Society
- Port Huron & Detroit Railroad Historical Society
- Portland Area Historical Society
- Remus Area Historical Society
- Republic Area Historical Society
- Rochester-Avon Historical Society
- Rockford Area Historical Society
- Romeo Historical Society
- Roscommon Area Historical Society
- Rose City Area Historical Society
- Royal Oak Historical Society
- Historical Society of Saginaw County
- Saginaw Valley Railroad Historical Society
- Salem Area Historical Society
- Sanford Area Historical Society
- Sanilac County Historical Society
- Saugatuck-Douglas History Center
- Schoolcraft County Historical Society
- Sebewaing Area Historical Society
- Shepherd Area Historical Society
- Shiawassee County Historical Society
- South Lyon Area Historical Society
- Southfield Historical Society
- St. Joseph County Historical Society
- St. Louis Area Historical Society
- Sturgis Historical Society
- Sunfield Historical Society
- Taylor Historical Society
- Tecumseh Area Historical Society
- Tekonsha Historical Society
- Tompkins Center Historical Society
- Traverse Area Historical Society
- Troy Historical Society, Michigan
- Van Buren County Historical Society
- Vicksburg Historical Society
- Wakefield Historical Society
- Wales Historical Society
- Warren Historical & Genealogical Society
- Washtenaw County Historical Society
- Waterford Township Historical Society
- Waterloo Area Historical Society
- Watrousville-Caro Area Historical Society
- Wayne County Historical and Pioneer Society
- Wayne Historical Society
- Webster Township Historical Society
- White Lake Historical Society
- Wixom Historical Society
- Ypsilanti Historical Society
- Zeeland Historical Society

== See also ==
- History of Michigan
- List of museums in Michigan
- National Register of Historic Places listings in Michigan
- List of historical societies in the United States
