= Ypsilanti, Michigan =

- City
- City of Ypsilanti
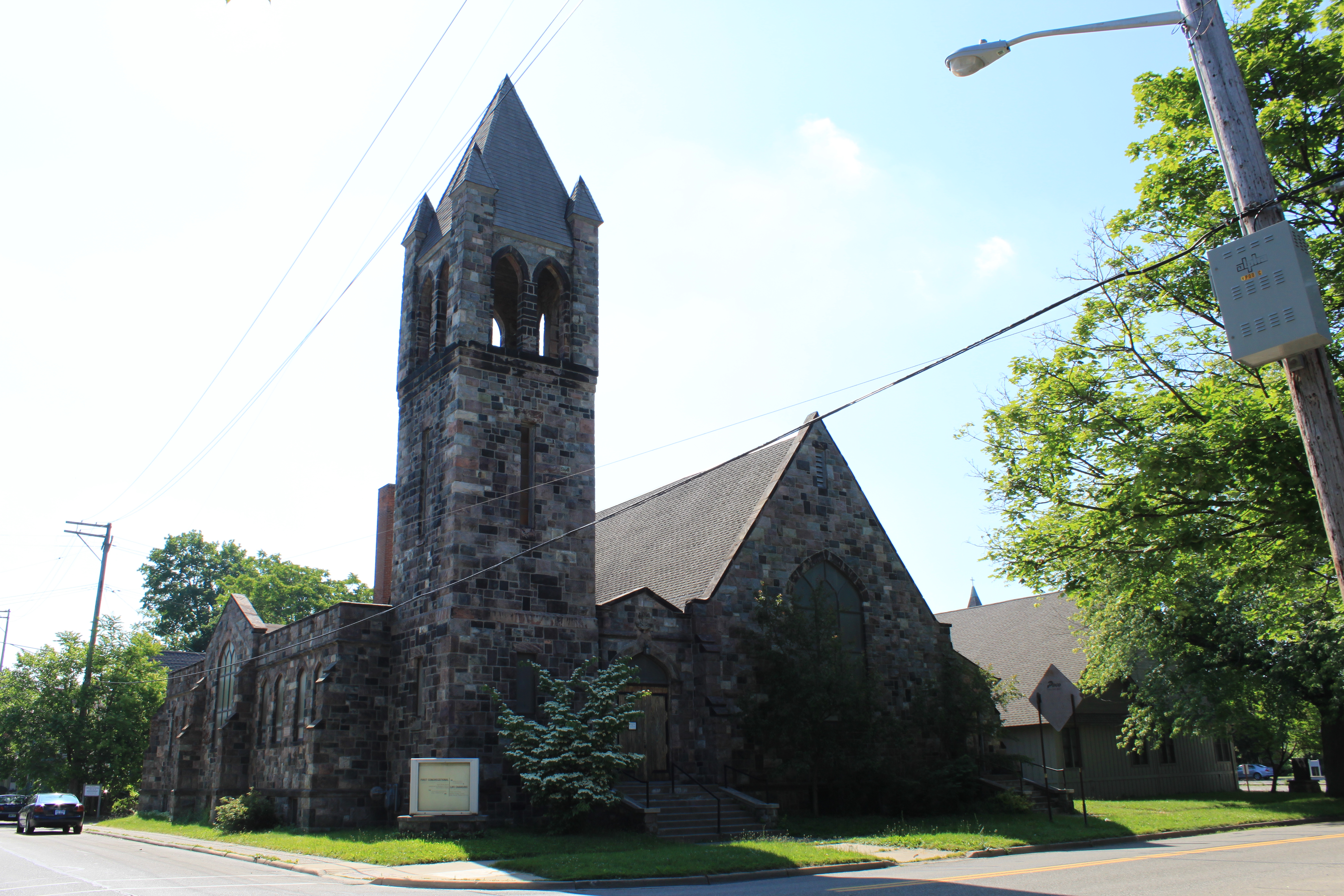
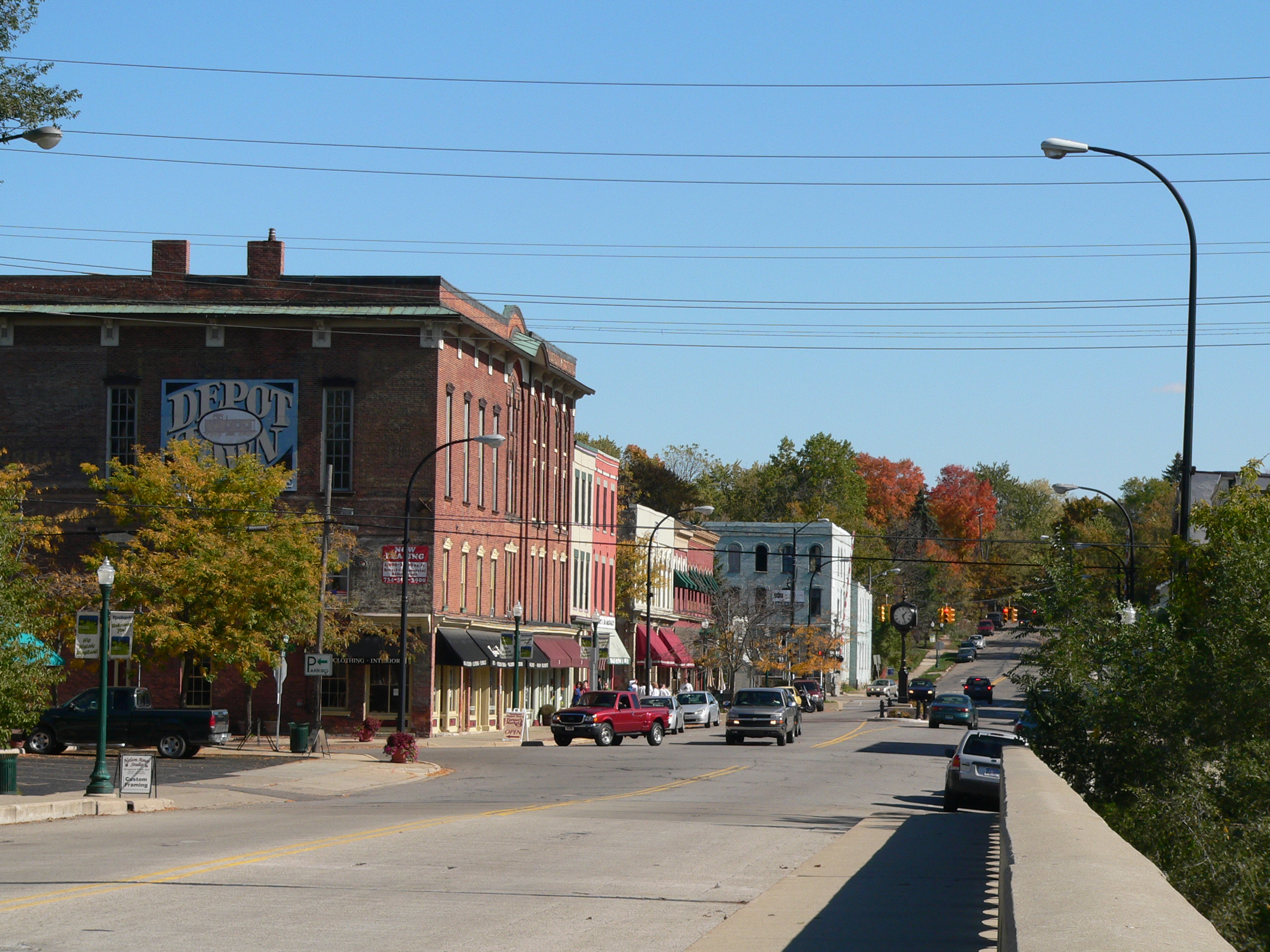
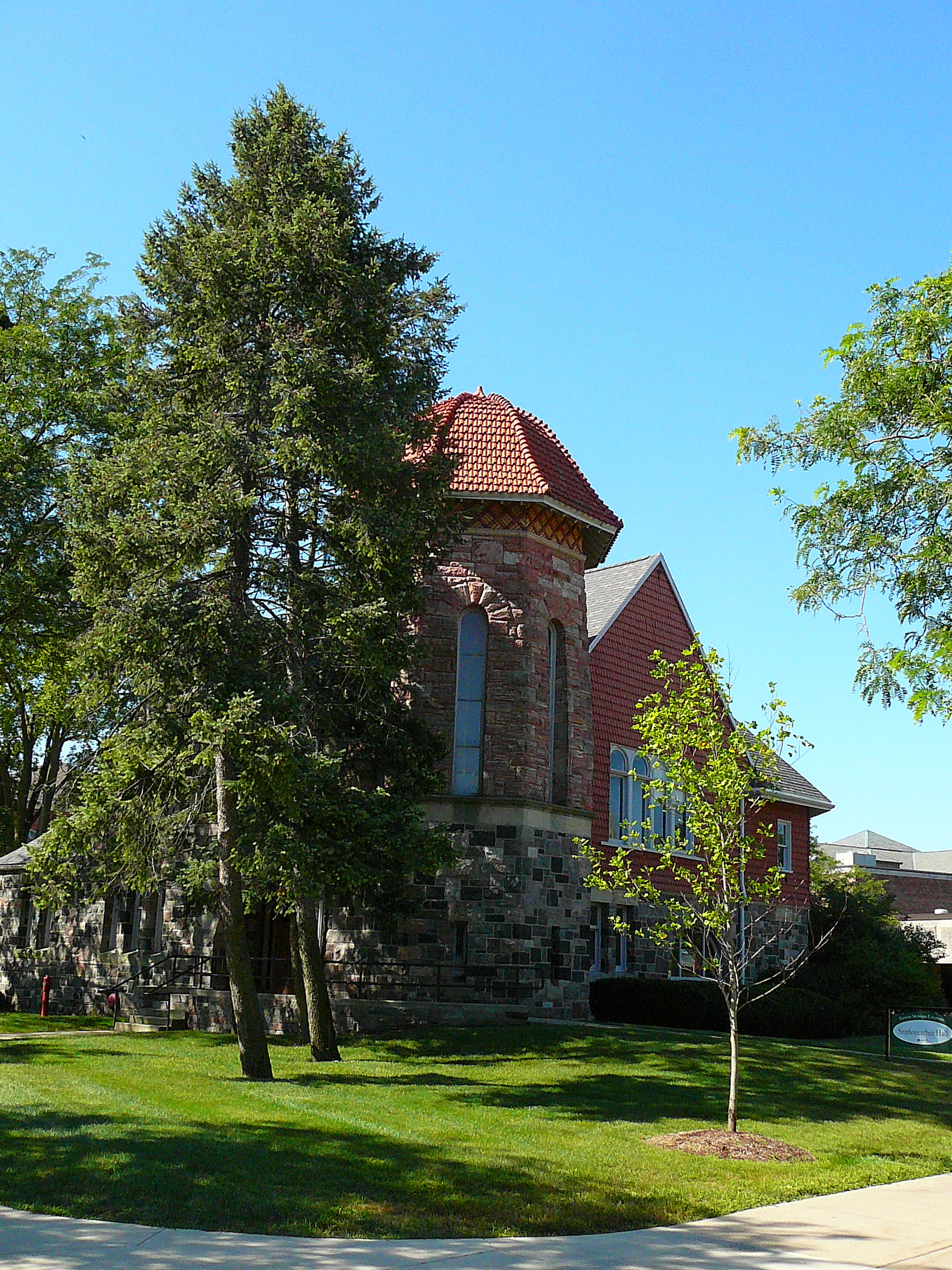
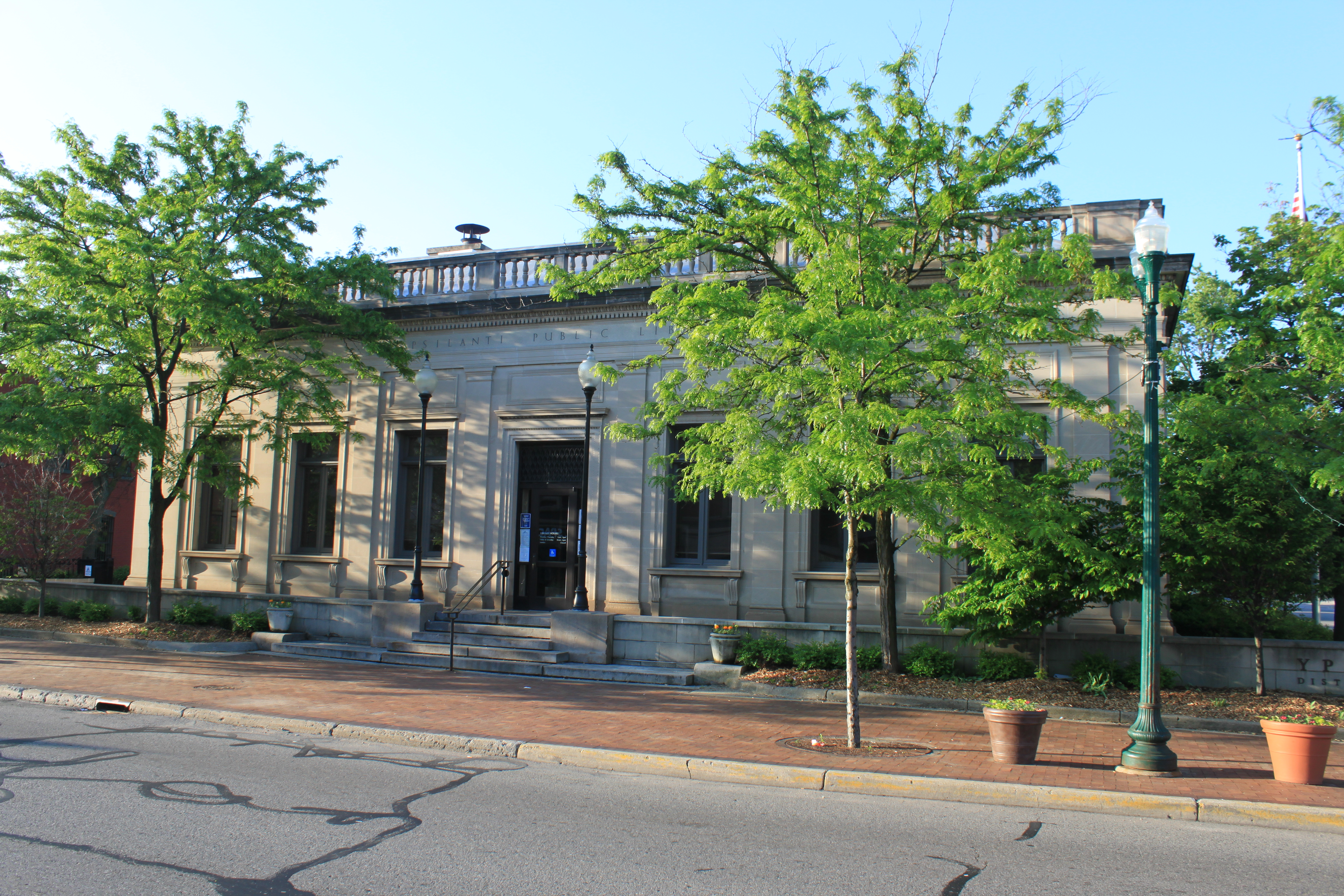
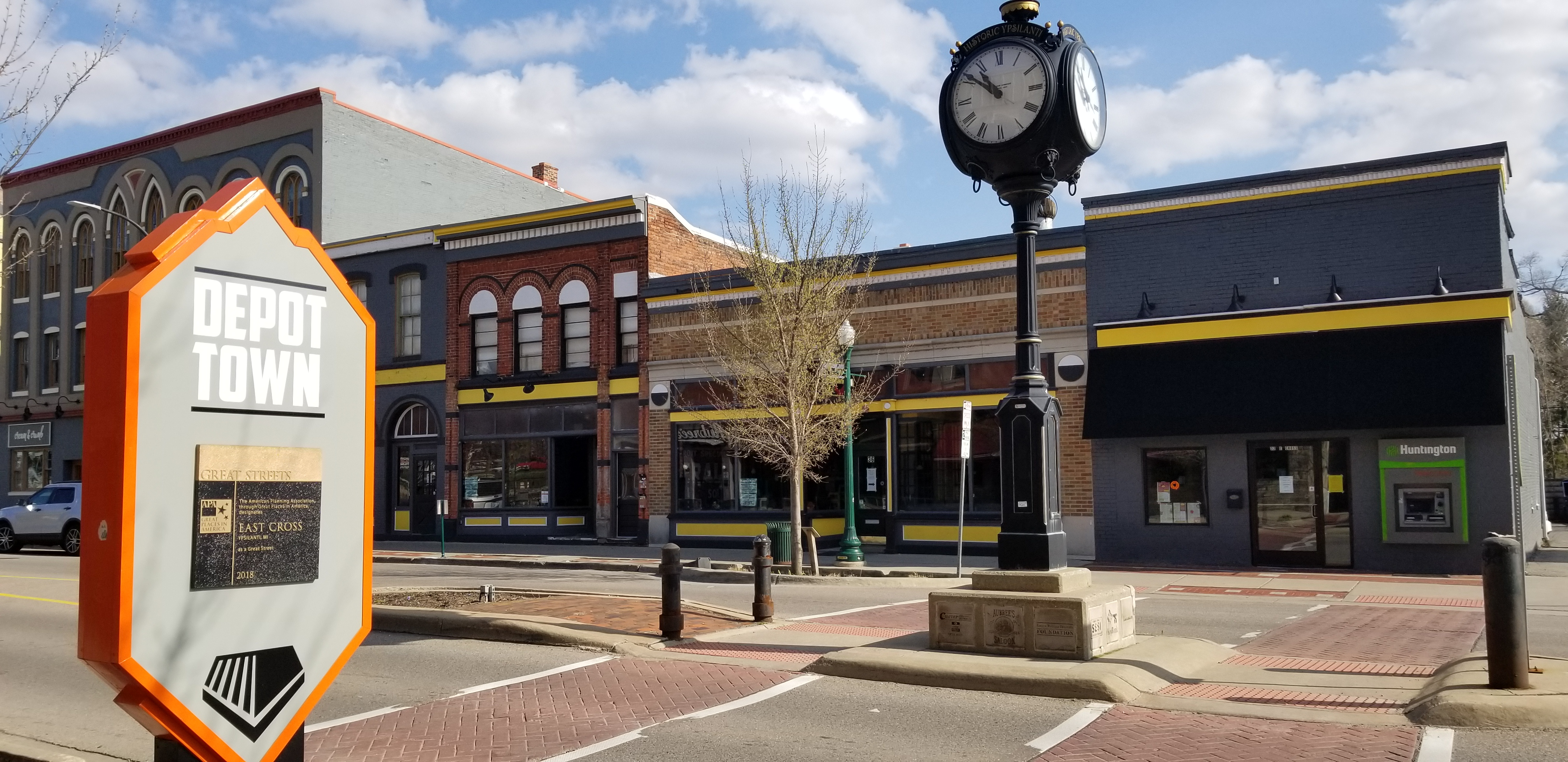
- Images from top to bottom, left to right: Ypsilanti Performance Space, Depot Town, Eastern Michigan University's Starkweather Hall, Ypsilanti District Library, and Depot Town Merchants Row

- Flag Seal
- Nicknames: Ypsi
- Motto: "Pride. Diversity. Heritage."
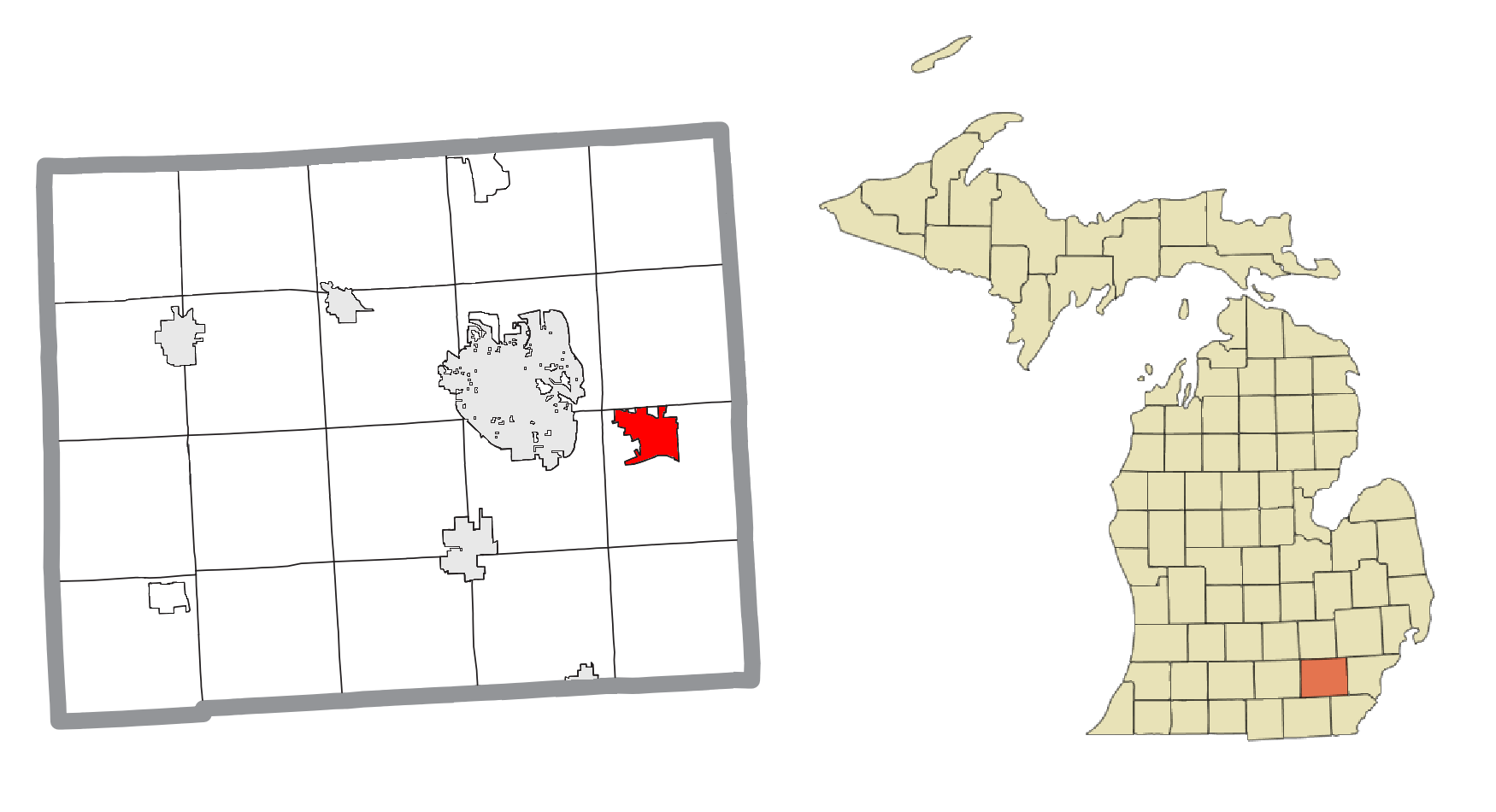
- Location within Washtenaw County

- Location within the State of Michigan Location within the United States
- Coordinates: 42°14′34″N 83°37′06″W
- Country: United States
- State: Michigan
- County: Washtenaw
- Settled: 1823
- Incorporated: 1832 (village); 1858 (city)
- Named for: Demetrios Ypsilantis

Government
  - Type: Council–manager
  - Mayor: Nicole Brown
  - Mayor pro-tem: Steve Wilcoxen

Area
  - Total: 4.47 sq mi (11.58 km^{2})
  - Land: 4.29 sq mi (11.12 km^{2})
  - Water: 0.18 sq mi (0.46 km^{2})
- Elevation: 719 ft (219 m)

Population (2020)
  - Total: 20,648
  - Density: 4,810.1/sq mi (1,857.19/km^{2})
- Time zone: UTC-5 (Eastern (EST))
  - Summer (DST): UTC-4 (EDT)
- ZIP code(s): 48197, 48198
- Area code: 734
- FIPS code: 26-89140
- GNIS feature ID: 1616910
- Website: cityofypsilanti.com

Ypsilanti (/ˌɪpsəˈlænti/ IP-sə-LAN-tee), commonly shortened to Ypsi (/ˈɪpsiː/ IP-see), is a city and college town located on the Huron River in Washtenaw County, Michigan, United States. As of the 2020 census, the city's population was 20,648. The city is bounded to the north by Superior Charter Township and on the west, south, and east by Ypsilanti Charter Township (a separately governed municipality). Ypsilanti is a part of the Ann Arbor–Ypsilanti metropolitan area, the Huron River Valley, and the Detroit–Warren–Ann Arbor combined statistical area.

Ypsilanti is known for being the home of Eastern Michigan University (formerly the Michigan State Normal College) since the university's founding as Michigan's first normal school (teachers' college) in 1849, its location on the historic Detroit–Chicago Road (now US Highway 12), its historic Depot Town commercial district, and for its distinctive Ypsilanti Water Tower constructed in 1890. The city is closely associated with Ford Motor Company's Willow Run Bomber Plant which manufactured over 8,500 Consolidated B-24 Liberator heavy bombers during World War II; Ypsilanti's Ford Lake was created when Ford Motor Company dammed the Huron River to generate hydroelectric power. Ypsilanti is also home to the first Domino's Pizza location, located near EMU's McKenny Student Union in South Campus.

== History ==
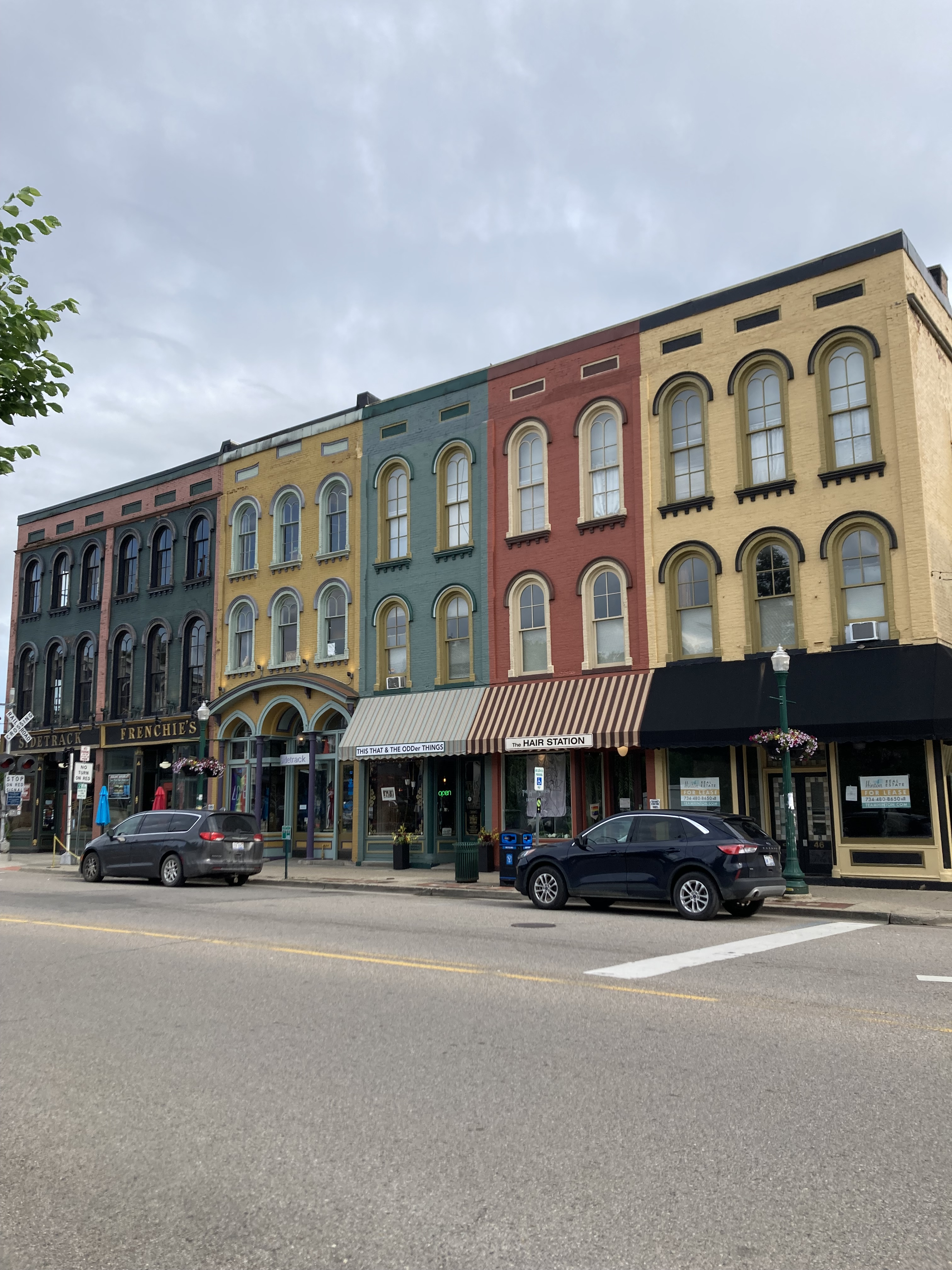
Buildings in Depot Town

Originally a trading post established in 1809 by a French-Canadian fur trader from Montreal, a permanent settlement was established on the east side of the Huron River in 1823 by Major Thomas Woodruff. It was incorporated into the Territory of Michigan as the village Woodruff's Grove. A separate community a short distance away on the west side of the river was established in 1825 under the name "Ypsilanti", after Demetrios Ypsilantis, a hero in the Greek War of Independence. Woodruff's Grove changed its name to Ypsilanti in 1829, the year its namesake effectively won the war for Greek Independence at the Battle of Petra, with the two communities eventually merging. A bust of Demetrios Ypsilantis by Greek sculptor Christopher Nastos stands between a Greek and a US flag at the base of the landmark Ypsilanti Water Tower.

Elijah McCoy lived in Ypsilanti with his family after moving from Canada following the Civil War. In Ypsilanti, racial barriers prevented him from working immediately as an engineer, so he took a position as a fireman and oiler for the Michigan Central Railroad while experimenting with machinery in a home workshop. It was during this period in Ypsilanti that he developed his first automatic lubricator. Today, Ypsilanti honors McCoy’s connection to the city with a Michigan historical marker at or near his former home and workshop.

In the late 19th century, Ypsilanti became known for producing full-body long underwear called union suits, commonly referred to as "Ypsilanti suits." The garments were made at the Hay & Todd woolen mill, later renamed the Ypsilanti Underwear Company, along the Huron River near Forest Avenue. The suits were displayed at the 1893 The World's Columbian Exposition, (also known as the Chicago World's Fair) in Chicago and distributed internationally, earning the city a reputation for quality garment production. The factory employed many workers, particularly women, and featured a large mural of a union suit visible to passing trains. The company declined in the early 20th century, was sold to the Oak Knitting Company in 1907, and the mill buildings were demolished in 1933. Surviving examples of Ypsilanti underwear are preserved at the Ypsilanti Historical Museum.

Ypsilanti has played an important role in the automobile industry. From 1920 to 1922, Apex Motors produced the "ACE" car. The quarter mile stretch of land along Michigan Avenue became a hub for car dealerships starting in 1912 when the first car dealership opened, and ending in the 1990s when the last dealership closed. This area has been referred to as "The Amazing Quarter Mile" and was eventually added to the Ypsilanti Historic District. This site is part of a collection of parcels known as the Water Street Redevelopment Area. It was in Ypsilanti that Preston Tucker (whose family owned the Ypsilanti Machine Tool Company) designed and built the prototypes for his Tucker '48. Tucker's story was related in the film Tucker: The Man and His Dream, directed by Francis Ford Coppola.

In 1945, Henry J. Kaiser and Joseph W. Frazer bought the nearby Willow Run B-24 Liberator bomber plant from Ford Motor Company, and started to make Kaiser and Frazer model cars in 1947. The last Kaiser car made in Ypsilanti rolled off the assembly line in 1953, when the company merged with Willys–Overland and moved production to Toledo, Ohio. General Motors purchased the Kaiser Frazer plant, and converted it into its Hydramatic Division (now called its Powertrain division), beginning production in November 1953. The GM Powertrain Division ceased production at this facility in 2010.

Ypsilanti is also the location of the last Hudson automobile dealership. Today, the former dealership is the site of the Ypsilanti Automotive Heritage Collection. The museum is the home to an original Fabulous Hudson Hornet race car, which inspired the character Doc Hudson in the 2006 Pixar animated film Cars.

In the early 1970s, the citizens reduced the penalty for the use and sale of marijuana to $5 (the Ypsilanti Marijuana Initiative; see also the Human Rights Party).

In 1979, Faz Husain was elected to the Ypsilanti city council, the first Muslim and the first native of India to win elected office in Michigan.

In the 1990s, Ypsilanti became the first city in Michigan to pass a living wage ordinance.

On July 23, 2007, Governor Jennifer Granholm announced that Ypsilanti, along with the cities of Caro and Clio, was chosen by the Michigan State Housing Development Authority (MSHDA) to take part in the Blueprints for Michigan's Downtowns program. The award provides for an economic development consultant to assist Ypsilanti in developing a growth and job creation strategy for the downtown area.

On June 23, 2020, Mayor Beth Bashert resigned after a controversial comment she made about race during a Zoom meeting.

=== Timeline ===
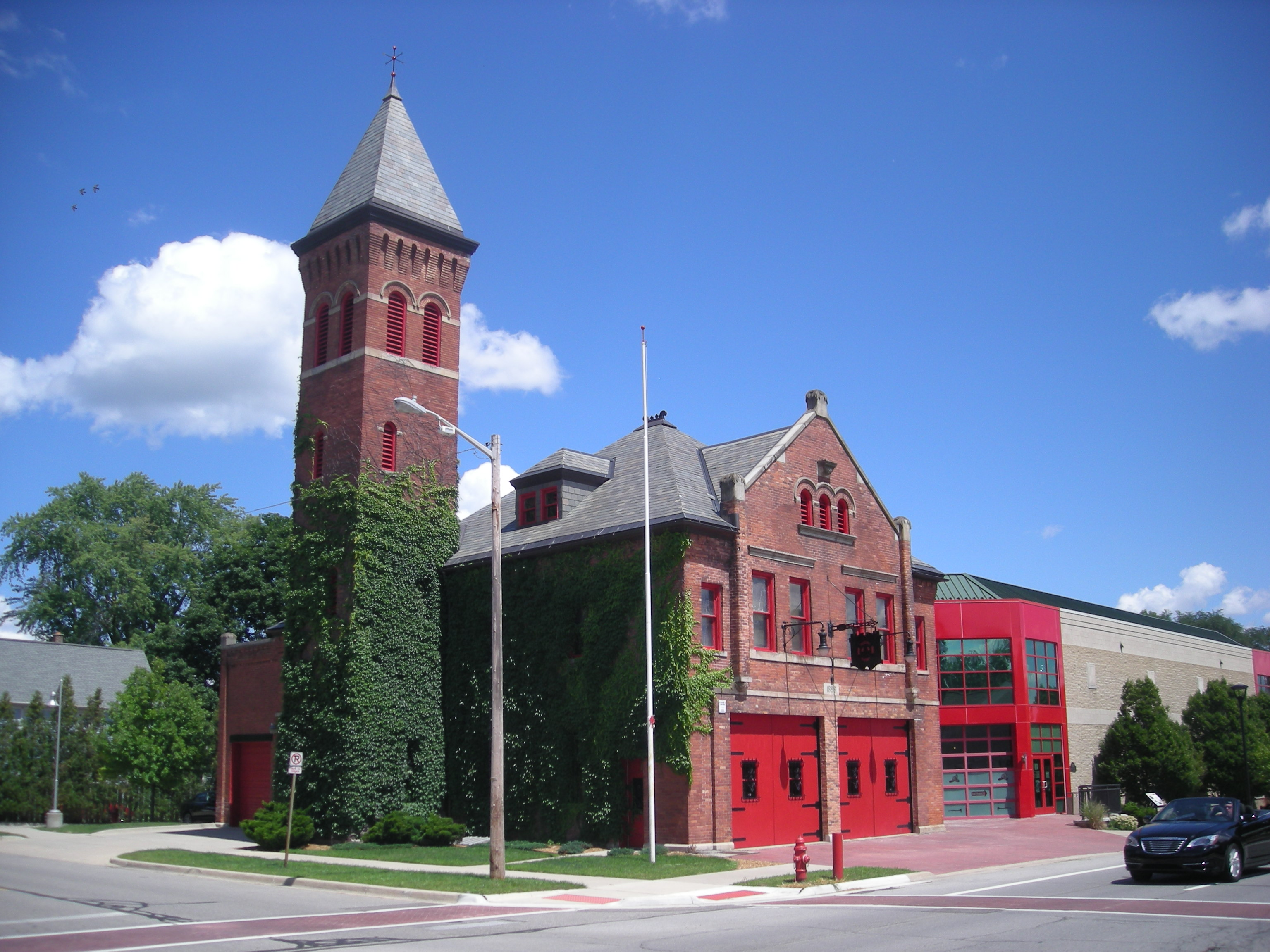
Michigan Firehouse Museum

- 1929 – Miller Motors Hudson opens, it eventually becomes the last Hudson dealership in the world
- 1931 – McKenny Union opens as the first student union on the campus of a teachers' college.
- 1937 – American jazz musician Nat King Cole married singer and dancer Nadine Robinson at a private residence located at 370 First Avenue. The couple, who had met while performing in the musical revue Shuffle Along, were married on January 29, 1937.
- 1939–mid‑1940s – Phyllis Diller lived at 215 ½ Oakwood Street in Ypsilanti while her husband worked at the Willow Run bomber plant. Locals recall her singing in the Presbyterian Church choir and performing at community events. She also developed early comedic routines referencing neighborhood life, which she later incorporated into her professional comedy acts.
- 1967–1969 – Ypsilanti resident John Norman Collins was linked to the Michigan Murders, a series of killings targeting female students at the University of Michigan and Eastern Michigan University. He was arrested in July 1969 and convicted of one murder on August 19, 1970.
- 1998 – The Michigan Firehouse Museum is established preserving a firehouse built in 1898.

== Geography ==
According to the U.S. Census Bureau, the city has a total area of 4.47 square miles (11.58 km^{2}), of which 4.29 square miles (11.11 km^{2}) is land and 0.18 square miles (0.47 km^{2}) (4.02%) is water.

The Huron River flows through Ypsilanti with Ford Lake on the southern edge of the city. Paint Creek also runs through the city. The Border-to-Border Trail runs through the city.

== Demographics ==
Historical population
Census	Pop.	Note	%±
1860	3,955		—
1870	5,471		38.3%
1880	4,984		−8.9%
1890	6,129		23.0%
1900	7,378		20.4%
1910	6,230		−15.6%
1920	7,413		19.0%
1930	10,143		36.8%
1940	12,121		19.5%
1950	18,302		51.0%
1960	20,957		14.5%
1970	29,538		40.9%
1980	24,031		−18.6%
1990	24,818		3.3%
2000	22,362		−9.9%
2010	19,435		−13.1%
2020	20,648		6.2%
Sources: US census (1900–2000); U.S. Census Bureau (2009)

=== Racial and ethnic composition ===
Ypsilanti, Michigan – Racial and ethnic composition Note: the US Census treats Hispanic/Latino as an ethnic category. This table excludes Latinos from the racial categories and assigns them to a separate category. Hispanics/Latinos may be of any race.
Race / ethnicity (NH = Non-Hispanic)	Pop 2000	Pop 2010	Pop 2020	% 2000	% 2010	% 2020
White alone (NH)	13,529	11,543	12,263	60.50%	59.39%	59.39%
Black or African American alone (NH)	6,793	5,596	4,856	30.38%	28.79%	23.52%
Native American or Alaska Native alone (NH)	87	96	56	0.39%	0.49%	0.27%
Asian alone (NH)	710	653	652	3.18%	3.36%	3.16%
Pacific Islander alone (NH)	13	7	39	0.06%	0.04%	0.19%
Some Other Race alone (NH)	68	42	174	0.30%	0.22%	0.84%
Mixed Race or Multi-Racial (NH)	610	740	1,292	2.73%	3.81%	6.26%
Hispanic or Latino (any race)	552	758	1,316	2.47%	3.90%	6.37%
Total	22,362	19,435	20,648	100.00%	100.00%	100.00%

=== 2020 census ===
As of the 2020 census, Ypsilanti had a population of 20,648. The median age was 27.9 years. 14.6% of residents were under the age of 18 and 9.5% of residents were 65 years of age or older. For every 100 females there were 91.2 males, and for every 100 females age 18 and over there were 89.1 males age 18 and over.

100.0% of residents lived in urban areas, while 0.0% lived in rural areas.

There were 8,600 households in Ypsilanti, of which 18.6% had children under the age of 18 living in them. Of all households, 20.8% were married-couple households, 32.0% were households with a male householder and no spouse or partner present, and 37.0% were households with a female householder and no spouse or partner present. About 43.4% of all households were made up of individuals and 9.1% had someone living alone who was 65 years of age or older.

There were 9,236 housing units, of which 6.9% were vacant. The homeowner vacancy rate was 1.3% and the rental vacancy rate was 4.8%.

Racial composition as of the 2020 census
Race	Number	Percent
White	12,619	61.1%
Black or African American	4,926	23.9%
American Indian and Alaska Native	113	0.5%
Asian	657	3.2%
Native Hawaiian and Other Pacific Islander	40	0.2%
Some other race	557	2.7%
Two or more races	1,736	8.4%
Hispanic or Latino (of any race)	1,316	6.4%

=== 2010 census ===
As of the census of 2010, there were 19,435 people, 8,026 households, and 2,880 families residing in the city. The population density was 4,488.5 inhabitants per square mile (1,733.0/km^{2}). There were 9,271 housing units at an average density of 2,141.1 per square mile (826.7/km^{2}). The racial makeup of the city was 61.5% White, 29.2% African American, 0.6% Native American, 3.4% Asian, 1.1% from other races, and 4.3% from two or more races. Hispanic or Latino residents of any race were 3.9% of the population.

There were 8,026 households, of which 18.4% had children under the age of 18 living with them, 19.7% were married couples living together, 12.1% had a female householder with no husband present, 4.0% had a male householder with no wife present, and 64.1% were non-families. 42.9% of all households were made up of individuals, and 7.8% had someone living alone who was 65 years of age or older. The average household size was 2.06 and the average family size was 2.92.

The median age in the city was 25 years. 14.1% of residents were under the age of 18; 35.8% were between the ages of 18 and 24; 25.3% were from 25 to 44; 16.6% were from 45 to 64; and 8.3% were 65 years of age or older. The gender makeup of the city was 49.7% male and 50.3% female.

=== 2000 census ===
As of the census of 2000, there were 22,362 people, 8,551 households, and 3,377 families residing in the city. The population density was 5,081.5 inhabitants per square mile (1,962.0/km^{2}). There were 9,215 housing units at an average density of 2,094.0 per square mile (808.5/km^{2}). The racial makeup of the city was 61.40% White, 30.58% African American, 0.44% Native American, 3.18% Asian, 0.07% Pacific Islander, 1.32% from other races, and 3.01% from two or more races. Hispanic or Latino residents of any race were 2.47% of the population. 13.6% were of German ancestry, 6.8% Irish, 6.4% English and 5.5% Polish heritage according to Census 2000.

There were 8,551 households, out of which 19.2% had children under the age of 18 living with them, 23.0% were married couples living together, 13.2% had a female householder with no husband present, and 60.5% were non-families. 40.4% of all households were made up of individuals, and 6.2% had someone living alone who was 65 years of age or older. The average household size was 2.15 and the average family size was 2.96.

In the city, 15.9% of the population was under the age of 18, 38.2% was from 18 to 24, 26.4% from 25 to 44, 12.4% from 45 to 64, and 7.0% was 65 years of age or older. The median age was 24 years. For every 100 females, there were 89.8 males. For every 100 females age 18 and over, there were 86.2 males.

The median income for a household in the city was $28,610, and the median income for a family was $40,793. Males had a median income of $30,328 versus $26,745 for females. The per capita income for the city was $16,692. About 16.9% of families and 25.8% of the population were below the poverty line, including 30.1% of those under age 18 and 15.3% of those age 65 or over.

== Arts and culture ==
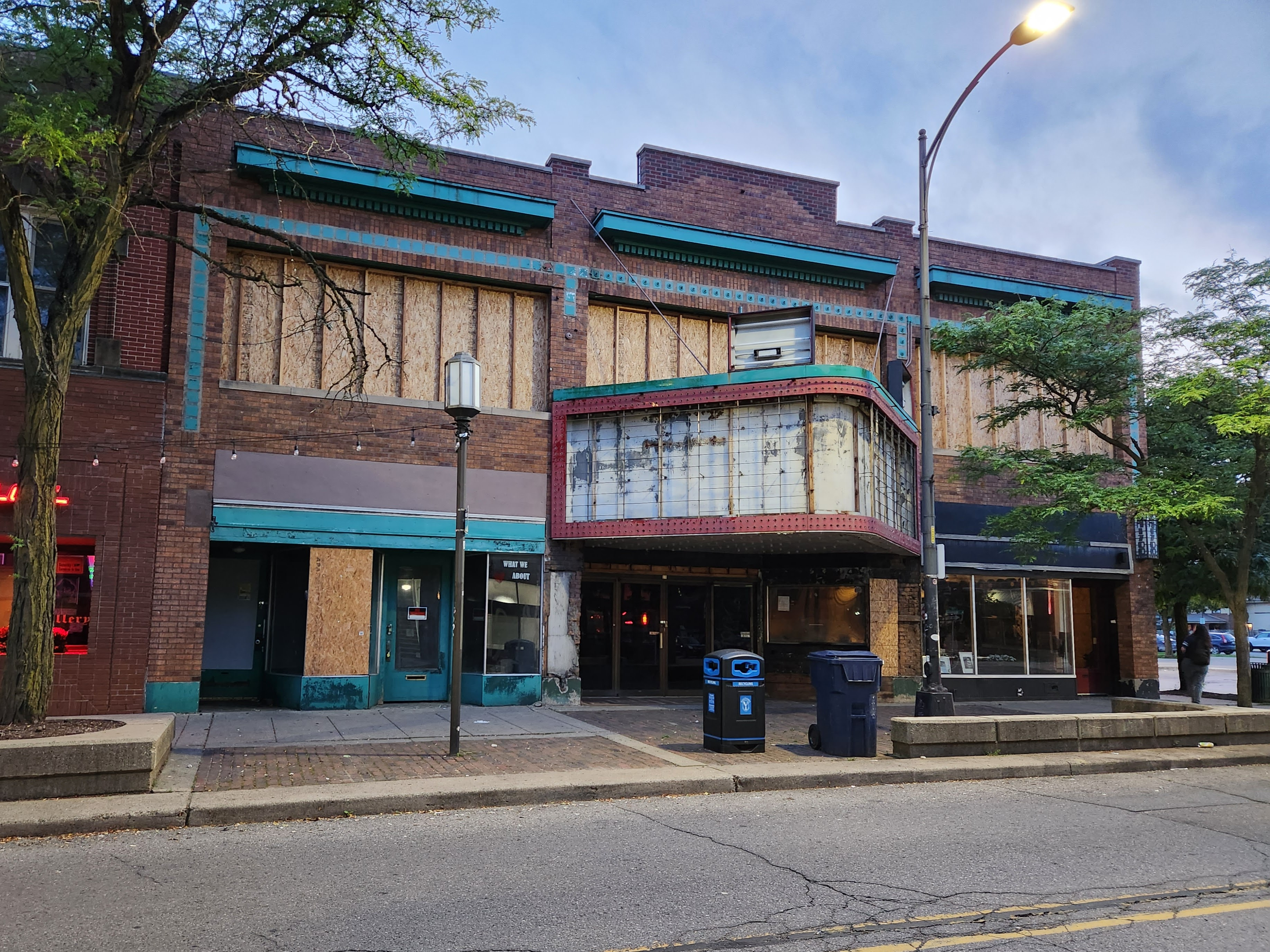
Martha Washington Theatre

The Martha Washington Theatre opened in 1915. It was initially operated by Florence W. Signor, who was the only woman theatre operator in Michigan at the time. It was sold to W. S. Butterfield Theatres in 1925. It was converted to an adult theatre in 1971, then to a strip club in 1982. It closed in March 2020 due to the COVID-19 pandemic, and was damaged in a fire three months later.

Domino's Pizza was founded in Ypsilanti in 1960 near the campus of Eastern Michigan University.

By 1963, Clara Owens established the Ypsilanti Greek Theater in Ypsilanti, Michigan for the performance of Greek theater productions.

Summer festivals that occur in Depot Town include the annual Ypsilanti Heritage Festival, Michigan ElvisFest, the Orphan Car Festival, the Michigan Brewers Guild Summer Beer Festival, a Latino festival.

Riverside Arts Center, established in 1994, features a 115-seat black box theater and art gallery.

Since 2013, Ypsilanti has participated in First Fridays, an arts and culture-based monthly event that features a self-guided tour of participating businesses highlighting local artists, food and drink.

Ypsi Pride was established in 2017.

=== Sites of interest ===
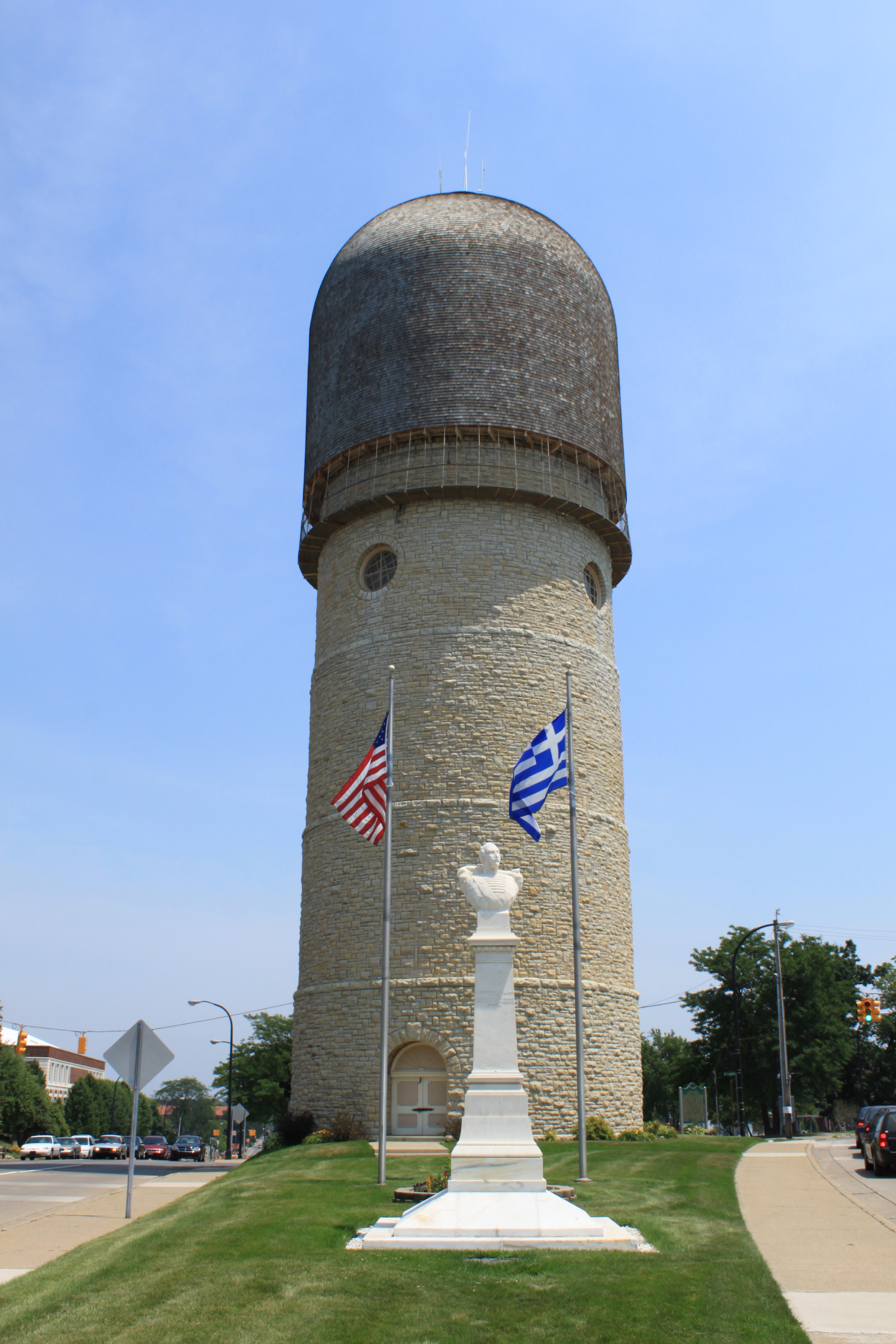
Ypsilanti Water Tower

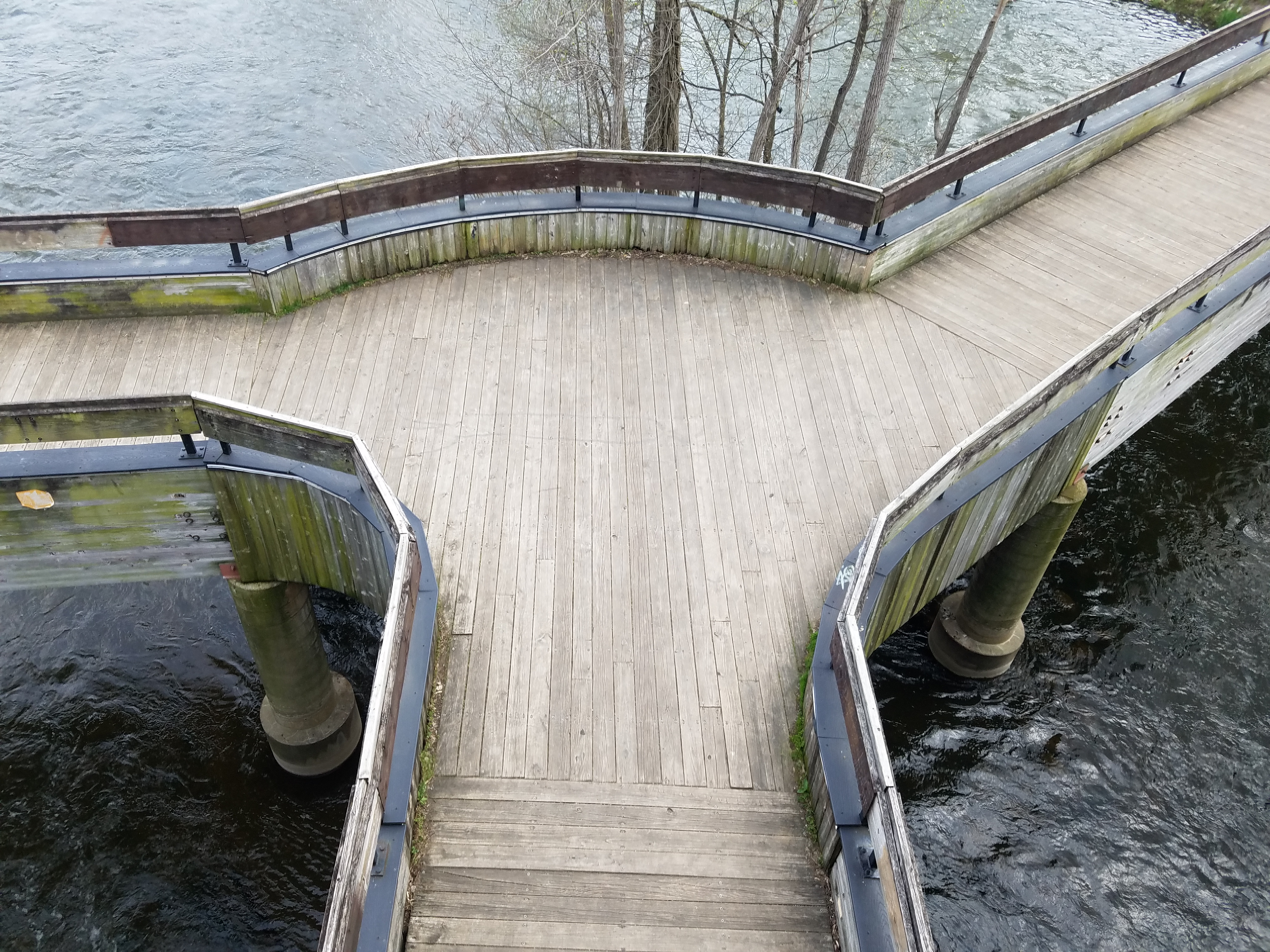
The Tridge

Sites of interest include:

- Ypsilanti District Library
- Ypsilanti Historical Museum (housed in a Victorian mansion built in 1860)
- Automotive Heritage Museum
- Michigan Firehouse Museum
- Ypsilanti Water Tower, built in 1890, described as Phallic architecture
- Ypsilanti Food Co-op
- Highland Cemetery, founded in 1864
- Pease Auditorium, built in 1914 (on the campus of Eastern Michigan University)
- Starkweather Hall, built in 1896 as a student religious center
- Peninsular Paper Dam
- Ladies' Literary Club Building, built in approximately 1843
- Brinkerhoff–Becker House, built in 1863–1869
- The Tridge, a three-way wooden footbridge.
- Ypsilanti Historic District, the second largest contiguous historic district in Michigan

== Parks and recreation ==
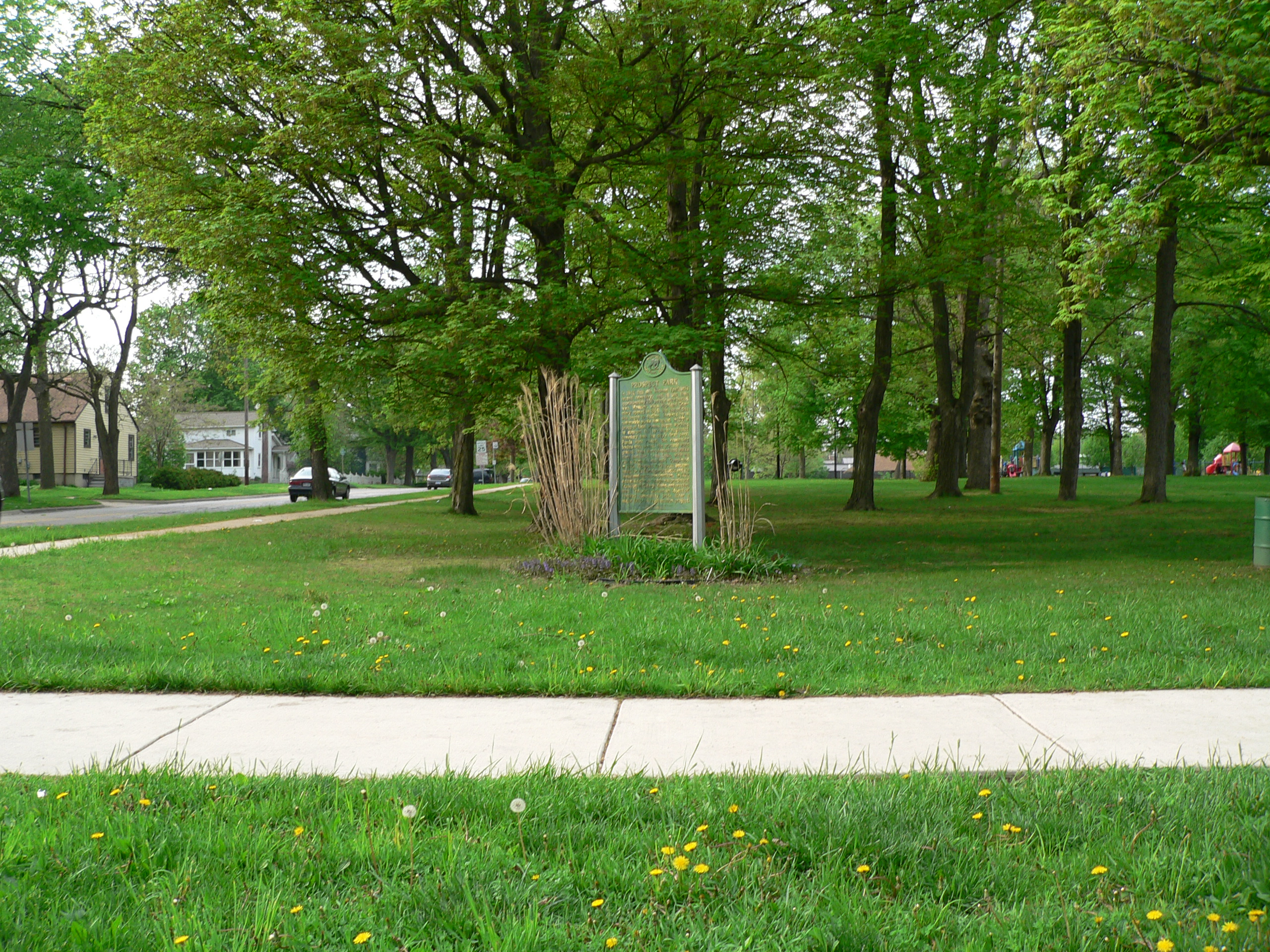
Prospect Park

Parks and recreation centers include:

- Border-to-Border Trail
- Prospect Park
- Riverside Park, which hosts the Ypsilanti Heritage Festival, Michigan ElvisFest, and Michigan Summer Beer Festival
- Frog Island Park
- Rutherford Municipal Pool

== Government ==
Ypsilanti City Council is composed of a mayor and six council members elected from three voting wards. The city uses a council–manager government. The mayor is Nicole Brown.

Mayors of Ypsilanti, Michigan

Image	Mayor	Years	Notes
	?	–1891	
	Henry Pierce Strong Glover	1891–1892	
	William B. Seymour	1893–1894	
	Harlow Davis Wells	1895–1896	
	Nolan Bruce Harding	1897–1898	
	Don Louis Davis	1898–1899	
	Henry R. Scoville	1900–1901	
	Oliver Emerson Thompson	1901–1902	
	Martin Dawson	1902–1903	
	Clifford R. Huston	1903–1905; 1905–1907	
	John Patrick Kirk	1908–1910	
	Tracy Lay Towner	1910–1912	
	Fran Austin Norton	1912–1914	
	Lee Nathan Brown	1914–1916	
	Clarence V. Brown	1916–1918; 1918–1920	
	Theodore E. Schaible	1920–1922	
	Emery Richard Beale	1922–1924	
	Hugh E. Vanderwalker	1924–1926; 1926–1928	
	Matthew Max	1928–1934	
	Ray H. Burrell	1934–1940	
	Ross K. Bower	1940–1946	
	Daniel Trowbridge Kirk	1947–1951	
	Carl J. Scheffler	1952–1954	
	?	–	
	John Burton	1967–1968	First appointed African-American mayor of Ypsilanti
	?	1968–1972	
	George D. Goodman	1972–1982	First elected African-American mayor of Ypsilanti
	?	1982–2020	
	Lois Allen-Richardson	2020–2022	First appointed female African-American mayor
	Nicole Brown	2022–Present	First elected female African-American mayor

== Education ==
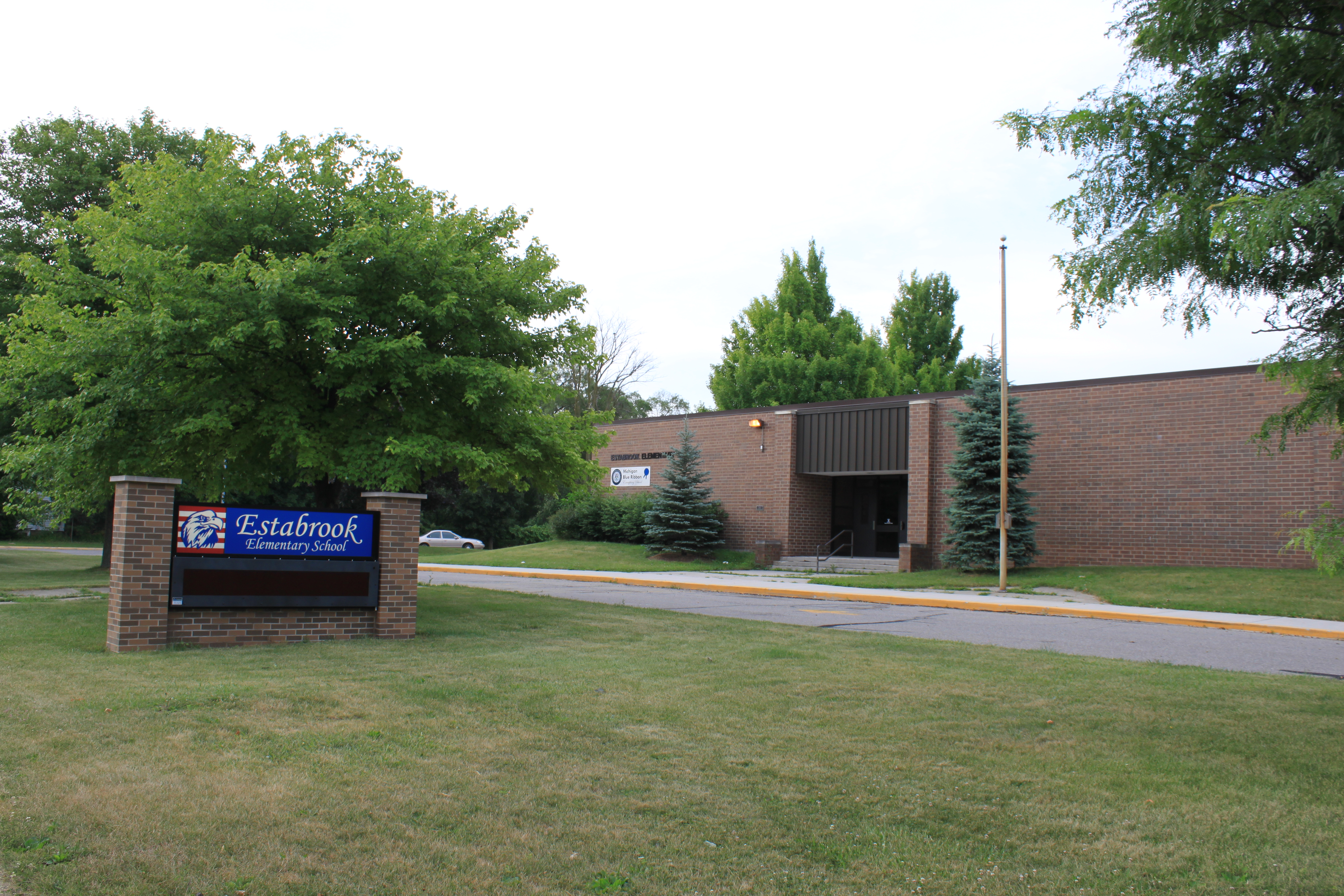
Estabrook Elementary School in Ypsilanti

=== K–12 education ===
Ypsilanti Community Schools serve residents of the city, as well as parts of Ypsilanti Township and Superior Township. Ypsilanti Public Schools and Willow Run Community Schools merged to form a new, united district on July 1, 2013. Charter schools in the city include Arbor Preparatory High School.

The High/Scope Perry Preschool Study, which studied the effects of preschool on the later lives of low income children, occurred in Ypsilanti.

=== Higher education ===
A college town, Ypsilanti is the location of Eastern Michigan University, founded in 1849 as Michigan State Normal School. Eastern Michigan University had over 10,000 undergraduate and more than 2000 graduate students in 2025.

Washtenaw Community College sponsors an off-site extension center in Ypsilanti.

== Media ==
Ypsilanti is served by daily newspapers from Detroit. Ypsilanti once had its own daily newspaper, the Ypsilanti Press, but that paper closed June 28, 1994, after 90 years in business. Upon closing, the Press sold its masthead, archives and subscriber list to The Ann Arbor News, which then began publishing an Ypsilanti edition. The Ann Arbor News ceased publication on July 23, 2009; it was replaced by a new Internet-based news operation, AnnArbor.com, which also produces print editions on Thursdays and Sundays. A weekly newspaper, the Ypsilanti Courier, is published every Thursday by Heritage Media from their Saline, Michigan offices. The only newspaper currently operating in Ypsilanti is Eastern Michigan University's independent newspaper The Eastern Echo.

Local radio stations include:

- WEMU FM – public radio
- WQBR – EMU's student-run radio
- WDEO – religious radio
- WSDS – Spanish-language
- WAAM – talk and news

=== Filming location ===
- The 2009 film Whip It was partly filmed in Ypsilanti.
- The 2010 film Stone was partially filmed at Emmanuel Lutheran Church.
- The 2012 film The Five-Year Engagement was filmed in downtown Ypsilanti and surrounding areas.
- The 2013 romantic drama Love and Honor includes scenes shot in Ypsilanti.
- The 2017 film Three Christs includes establishing shots of Michigan Avenue and the water tower.

== Infrastructure ==
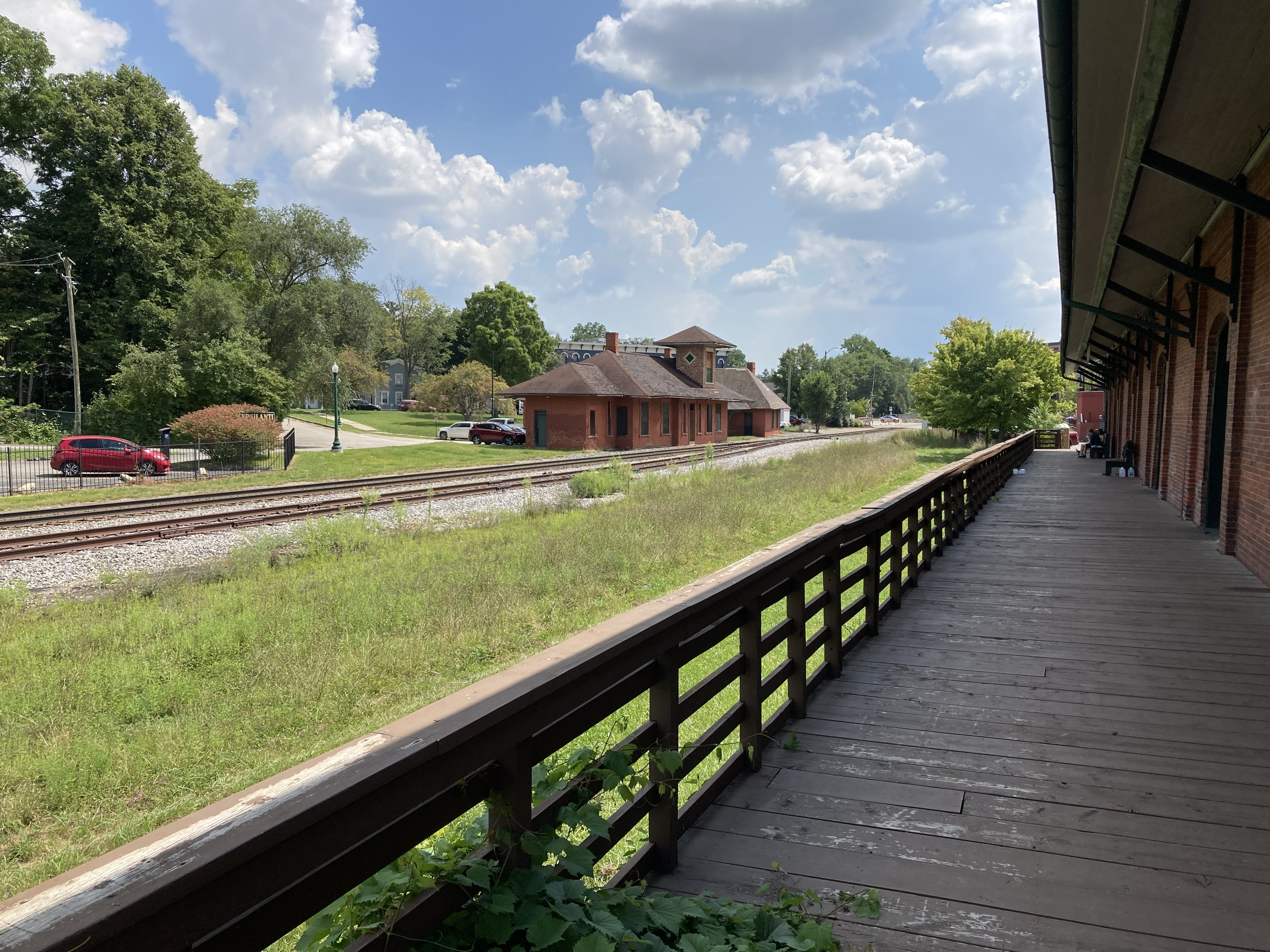
The freighthouse, a former train station converted to an event space

=== Major highways ===
- I-94
- US 12 (Michigan Avenue)
- Bus. US 12
- M-17 (Washtenaw Avenue)

=== Airport ===
Willow Run Airport, Ypsilanti's airport, located on the east side of the city, is a general aviation airport, operated by the Wayne County Airport Authority, which also operates Detroit's main airport.

=== Bus ===
- Ann Arbor Area Transportation Authority operates bus service in the area, with routes serving the Ypsilanti Transit Center.

== Notable people ==
- Blanch Ackers – folk artist and painter
- Ella Anderson – actress known for her role on Henry Danger as Henry's overreactive sister Piper Hart
- Nickolas Ashford – songwriter and singer in the duo Ashford & Simpson
- BabyTron – rapper
- Samiya Bashir – poet and author, born in Ypsilanti
- Mike Bass – NFL player, defensive back for Detroit Lions (1967) and Washington Redskins (1969–1975), scored touchdown in Super Bowl VII
- Walter Briggs Sr. – owner of Detroit Tigers 1919–1952, born in Ypsilanti
- John Burton (1910–1992), first African-American mayor and one of three African-American mayors elected in 1967 prior to which none had served in Michigan
- Emor L. Calkins – State president of the Michigan Woman's Christian Temperance Union for 25 years
- Jalen Chatfield – professional ice hockey player
- Byron M. Cutcheon – American Civil War general and U.S. Congressman
- Brandon Denson – professional Canadian Football League player who plays defensive end for the Ottawa Redblacks
- Amy Devers – furniture designer and TV personality (Freeform Furniture, Designer People, Trading Spaces, Fix This Yard, Home Made Simple)
- Ron Fernandes – American football player
- Adam Gase – former New York Jets head coach
- Ruth A. Gerry – one of the first female physicians in Michigan.
- Kyle Gupton – Basketball player
- Rodney Holman – NFL player, tight end for the Cincinnati Bengals (1982–1992), and the Detroit Lions (1993–1995)
- Jaylen Johnson (born 1996), basketball player for Hapoel Haifa of the Israeli Basketball Premier League
- Zeke Jones – Olympic wrestler
- Doug Kalitta – racing driver and owner of Kalitta Charters
- Colby Keller – visual artist, blogger and pornographic film actor
- Mike Kennedy – United States Congressman, raised in Ypsilanti and attended Ypsilanti High School.
- Charles S. Kettles – retired United States Army lieutenant colonel and a Medal of Honor recipient.
- Carolyn King – one of first girls to play Little League baseball; centerpiece of landmark lawsuit in 1973 that led to Little League dropping boys-only policy
- Janae Marie Kroc – record-setting powerlifter and transgender model
- Alfred Lucking – U.S. Congressman
- Helen Walker McAndrew (1825–1906) – Washtenaw County's first female physician and participant in the Underground Railroad
- William McAndrew (1863–1937), educator who served as the superintendent of Chicago Public Schools
- Elijah McCoy – inventor and participant in the Underground Railroad in Ypsilanti
- Shara Nova – lead singer and songwriter for My Brightest Diamond
- K. J. Osborn – NFL player, wide receiver for the Washington Commanders
- Russell C. Ostrander – former mayor of Lansing and Chief Justice of the Michigan Supreme Court
- Frank Owen – pitcher for 1906 World Series champion Chicago White Sox
- Lowell Perry – NFL football player, first African American hired to be assistant coach in the NFL
- Iggy Pop – rock star, "Godfather of Punk" – grew up in the Coachville trailer park, lot 963423, on Carpenter Road in Pittsfield Township (near Ypsilanti) during his teenage years at the start of his music career.
- Queen Naija – American R&B singer and YouTuber active from the 2010s through the 2020s; rose to prominence through social media and reality television before achieving mainstream success in contemporary and adult R&B.
- Charles Ramsey – former Eastern Michigan Eagles men's basketball head coach; he played on the YHS baseball, basketball and football teams
- Victor Roache – left fielder for Milwaukee Brewers
- Bob Schneider – American singer-songwriter active from the 1990s through the 2010s, working in pop/rock and roots rock; notable for extensive solo output and earlier work with bands including The Ugly Americans.
- Don Schwall – former MLB player (Boston Red Sox, Pittsburgh Pirates, Atlanta Braves)
- Dax Shepard – actor, born in Ypsilanti
- Ryan Shay (1979–2007) – long-distance runner
- Michael Joseph Sobran Jr. – known professionally as Joseph Sobran, conservative writer and syndicated columnist
- Bob Sutton – defensive coordinator for NFL's Kansas City Chiefs, New York Jets – head coach for Army 1991–1999
- Marie Tharp (1920–2006) – geologist who pioneered understanding of plate tectonics and continental drift
- Preston Tucker (1903–1956) – automobile entrepreneur, owned the Ypsilanti Tool & Dye Company.
- Edwin F. Uhl – mayor of Grand Rapids, ambassador, U.S. Secretary of State

== In popular culture ==
- Elizabeth Meriwether's 2006 play Heddatron is largely set in Ypsilanti.
