= Historical Society of Michigan =

Historical Society

The Historical Society of Michigan (HSM) is the official historical society of the State of Michigan. It was founded in 1828 by Territorial Governor Lewis Cass.

== See also ==
- List of historical societies in Michigan
