= Ypsilanti District Library =

Library in Washtenaw County, Michigan

Coordinates: 42.208°N 83.615°W

- The Whittaker Road branch in 2019
- Location: Washtenaw County, Michigan, United States
- Type: Public library
- Established: 1868; 158 years ago
- Branches: 3

Access and use
- Circulation: 854,000 (2025)

Other information
- Website: www.ypsilibrary.org

The Ypsilanti District Library (YDL) is a public library system in Washtenaw County, Michigan, serving Ypsilanti, Ypsilanti Township, and Superior Township. The library was founded in 1868 as a subscription library, and became a public library in 1899. As of 2025, the YDL system serves over 300,000 patron visits per year through three branches and a bookmobile service.

== History ==
=== Early history ===
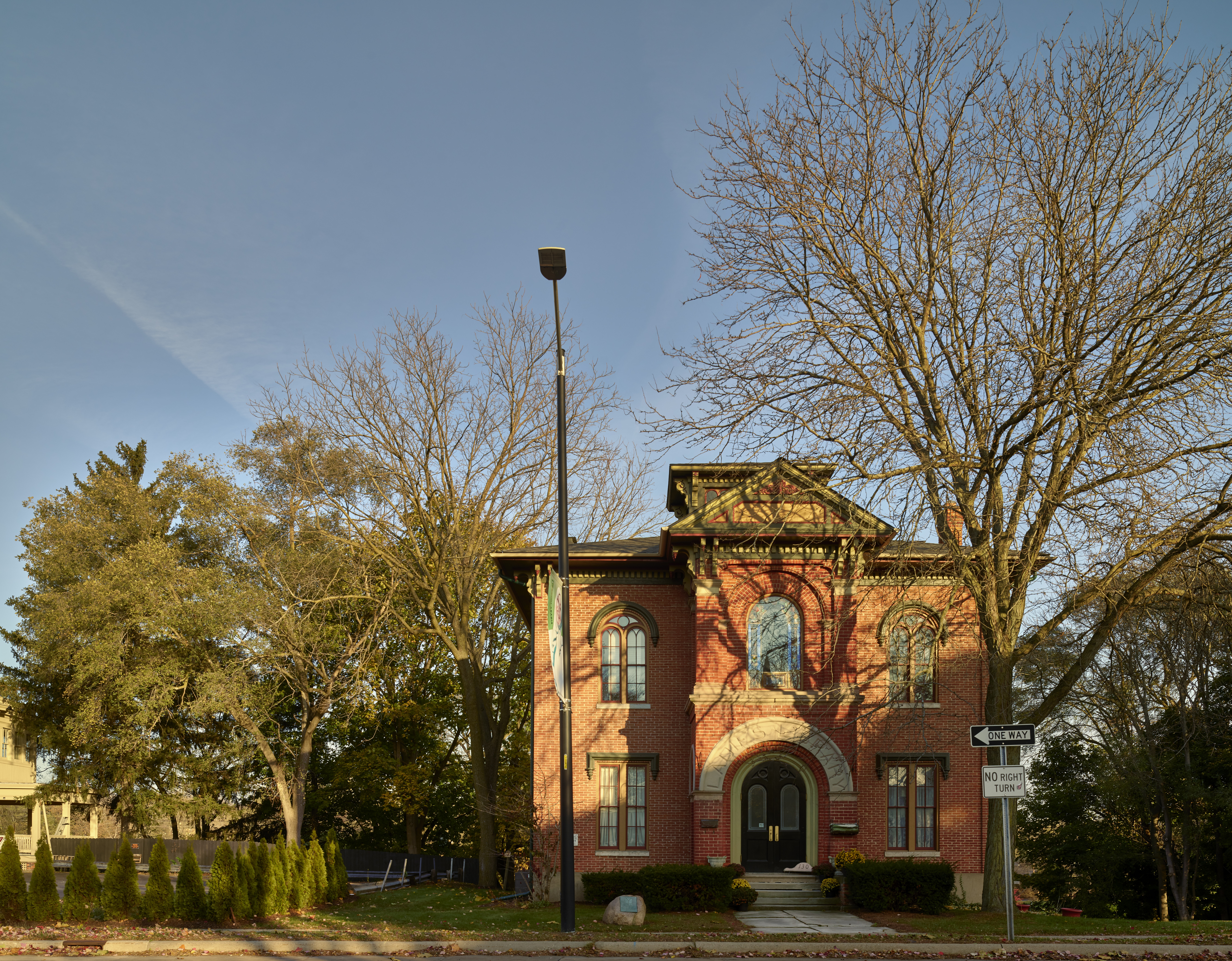
The former home of the library from 1890 to 1963

In 1868, a small group of women started a reading group that created a library, which originally included 175 volumes. They housed the library on the second floor of the Arcade Building on North Huron Street, and charged $1 per year (equivalent to $24.19 in 2025) for access to the library. In 1886, the Arcade Building became inadequate for the purpose and the library moved to the second floor on the Union Block on Michigan Avenue. In 1890, Mary Ann Starkweather donated her home to the 'Ladies' Library' on Huron Street as well as new furniture and a large stained glass window.

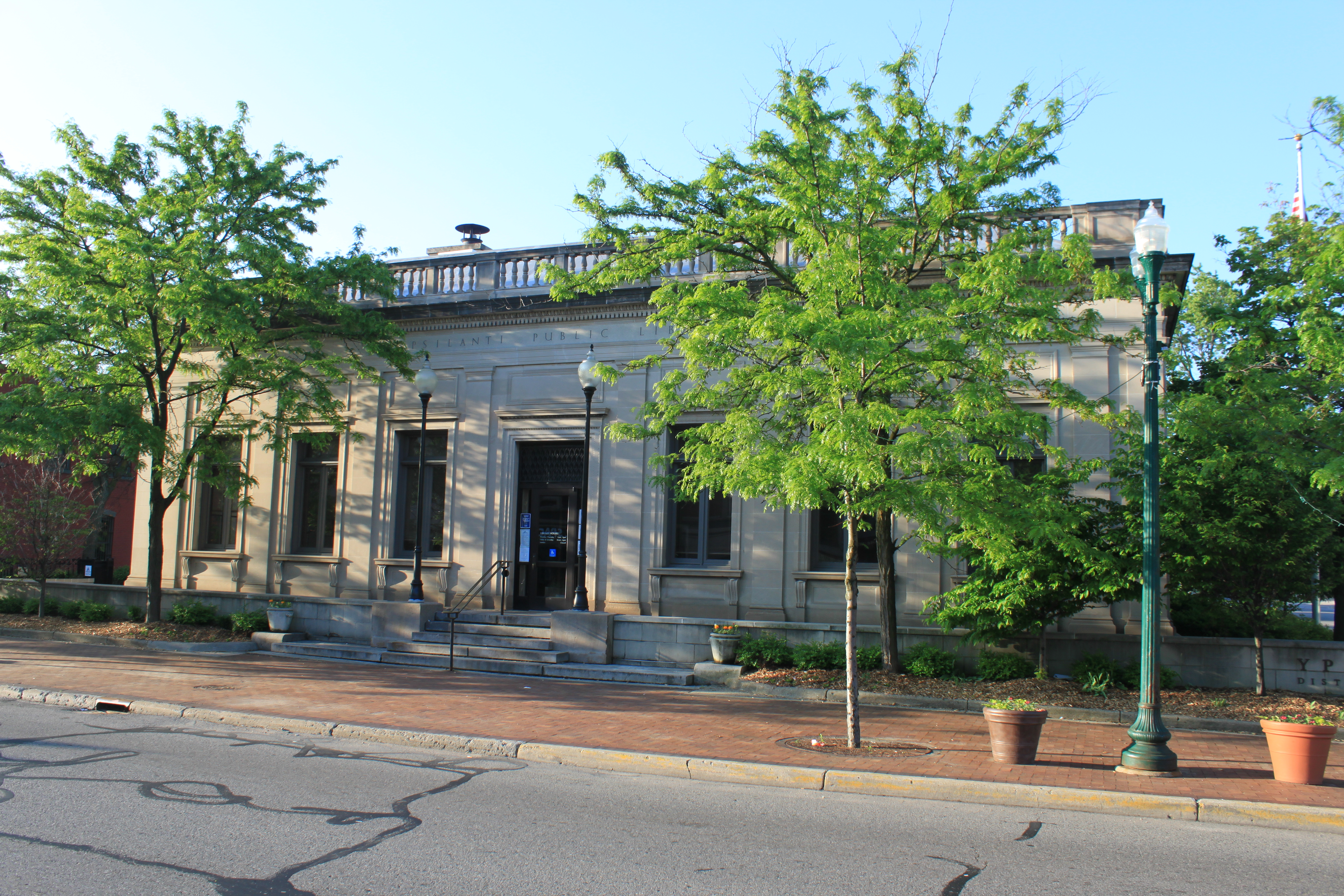
The current Downtown Ypsilanti branch on Michigan Avenue

The city of Ypsilanti began funding the library in 1899, making it free for all patrons. The city took over the Ladies' Library in 1949, changing the name to the Ypsilanti Public Library. In 1963, the library moved into a 1915 Beaux-Arts building that had previously housed the Ypsilanti post office at 229 West Michigan Avenue. The library began serving residents of nearby Ypsilanti Township in 1968, under an arrangement where the township paid the library $5 per library patron per year.

=== Challenges and transition to District Library ===
In 1983, the library faced challenges with its funding, and was closed from March 25 through June 1. A ballot proposal to create an independent library district passed on April 4, separating the Ypsilanti Public Library from the city of Ypsilanti, and creating the Ypsilanti District Library. The YDL opened its first branch in 1985, the Peters Branch, located in the former Ypsilanti Township Hall on Ecorse Road.

The newly formed District Library gained a new measure of self-governance in 1990, with the election of its first Board of Trustees, and permanent funding from a 0.65 mill property tax.

=== Expansion ===
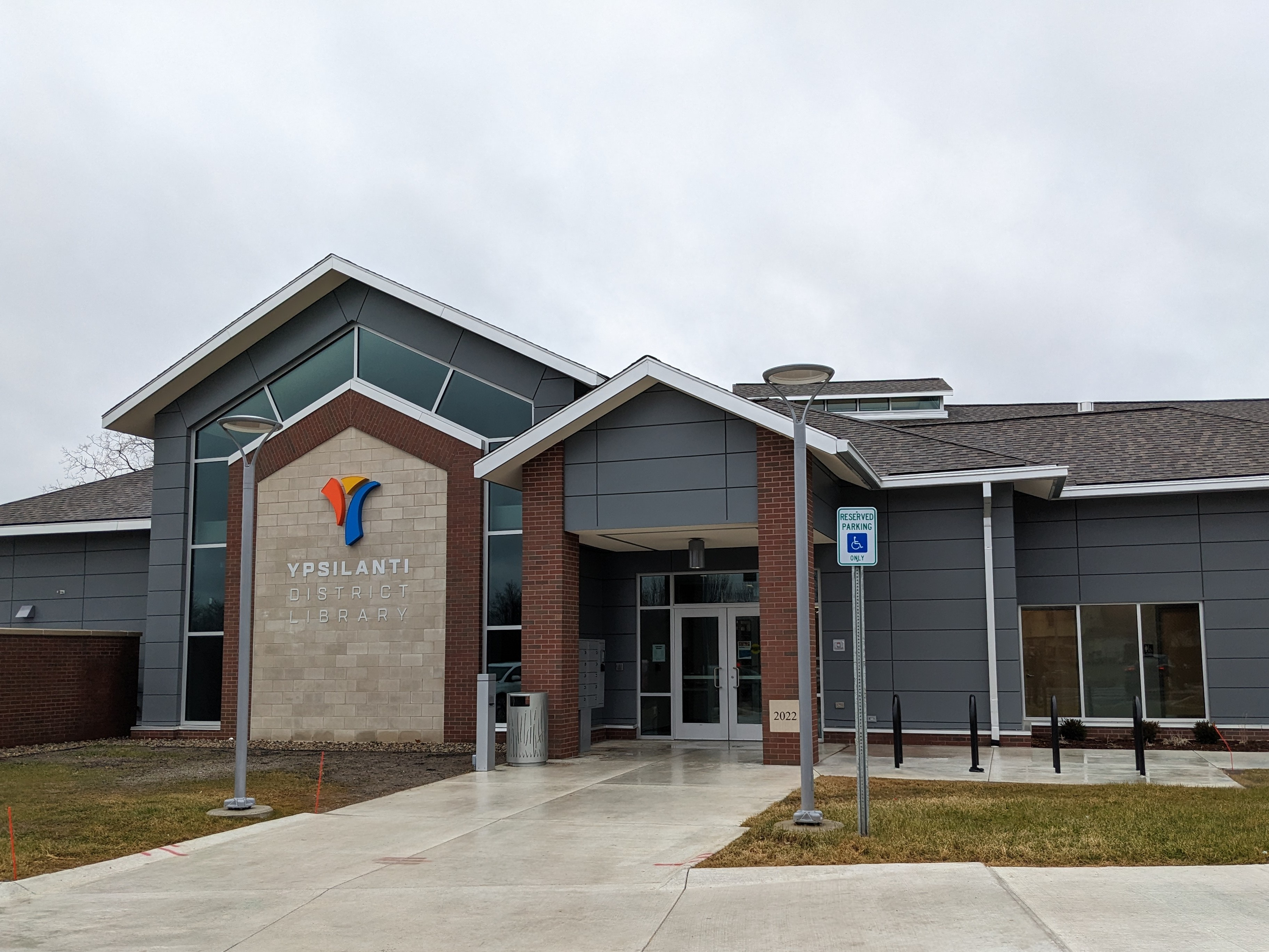
The new Superior Township branch opened in 2022, replacing a temporary building in a former fire station

The library expanded in 1992, opening the Roundtree branch at Ellsworth and Hewitt Roads, and expanding the Peters branch. A strategic plan adopted in 1995 called for a new, larger library building, which was approved by voters in 1998. The 1998 proposal approved the funding for a new library in Ypsilanti Township, along with a major renovation of the Michigan Avenue branch, and the purchase of a new bookmobile.

The new Ypsilanti Township library, located on Whittaker Road, broke ground in 2000, and opened in 2002. At 60,000 square feet, it remains the largest branch in the system, housing the library administration and the local history collection.

The Ypsilanti District Library received the John Cotton Dana Library Public Relations Award for its second annual Ypsilanti Songwriting Festival in 2009.

Superior Township joined the library district in 2006, expanding the library's service area to three municipalities. A temporary Superior Branch opened in 2007 in a former fire station on MacArthur Road, less than 2000 square feet in size. The temporary branch was replaced by a larger branch, which received funding in 2018, and opened in 2022.

After a storm in July 2023, the Michigan Avenue branch was closed for 21 months due to water damage.

== Administration ==
The library is governed by a seven-member Board of Trustees. Trustees are elected residents of the library district, serving four-year terms.

== Services ==
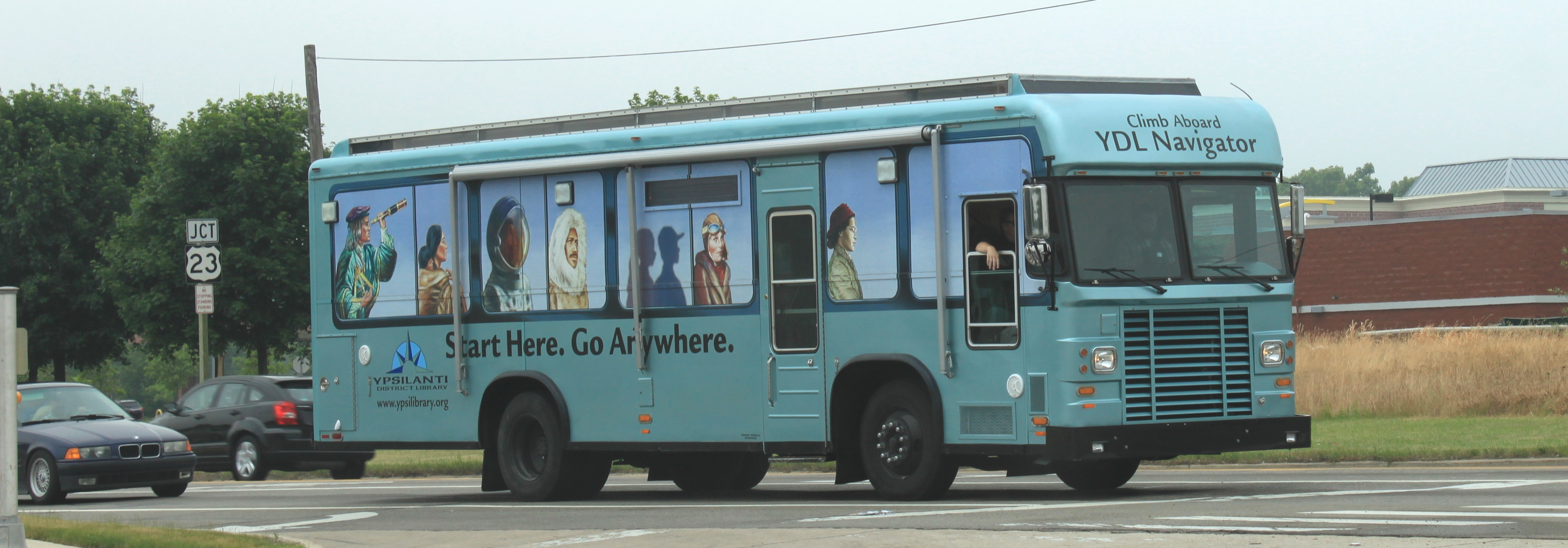
YDL bookmobile

The library provides many services including a bookmobile, inter-library loans, tax forms, photocopies, lively arts programs, community rooms and internet access. The library currently offers the ability to check out free passes to area museums including the Charles H. Wright Museum of African American History, the Arab American National Museum, Cranbrook Educational Community, and the Ypsilanti Historical Museum. The library also offers online book clubs, teen literacy activities, computer classes, and group book discussion.
