= Ypsilanti Historic District =

Historic district in Michigan, United States

- U.S. National Register of Historic Places
- U.S. Historic district
- Michigan State Historic Site
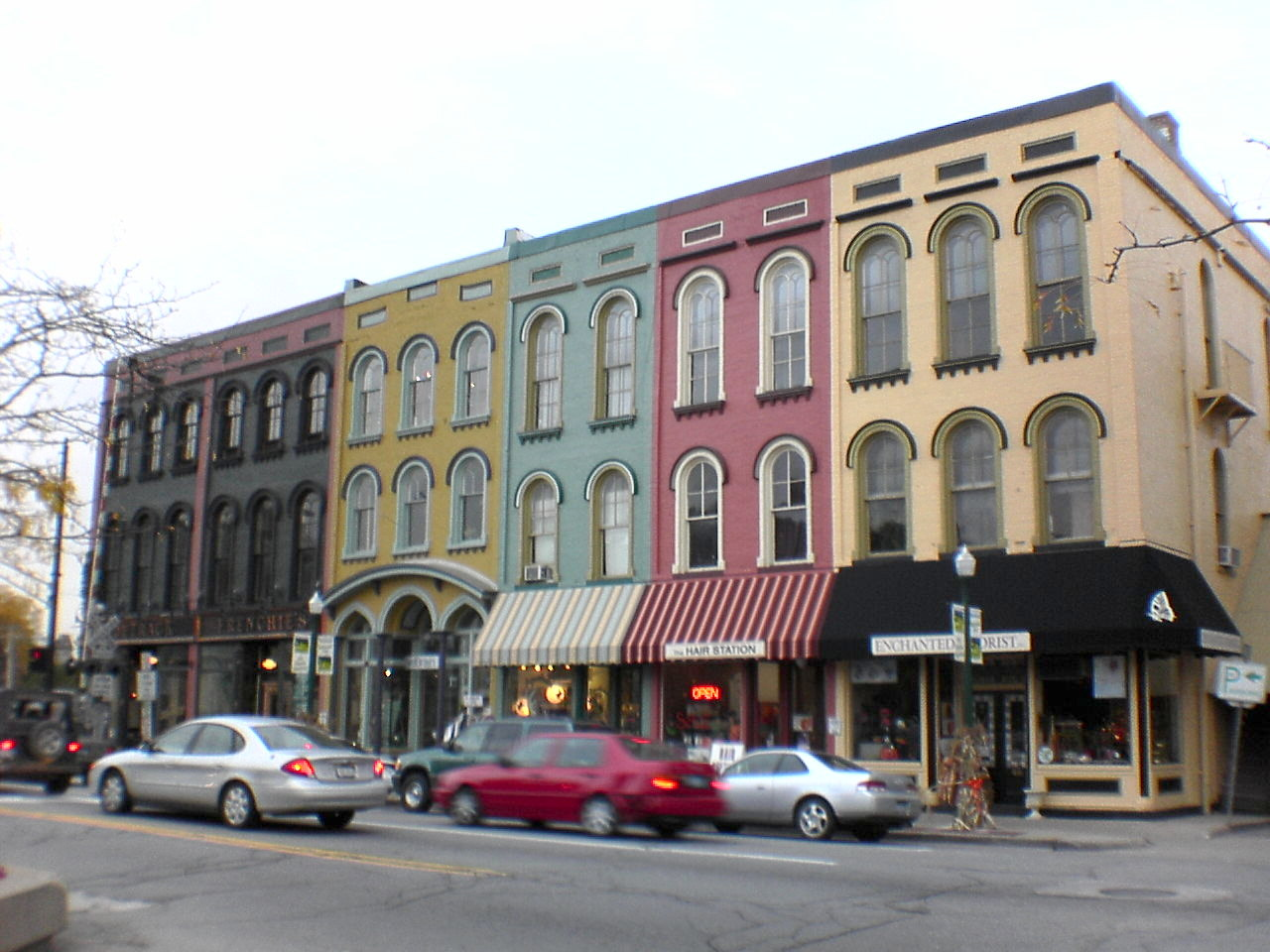
- Buildings on East Cross Street

- Location within Michigan Location within the United States
- Interactive map of Ypsilanti Historic District
- Location: Along Huron River with boundaries extending to Forest Ave., Prospect & Grove Sts., Buffalo St., and Hamilton & Summit Sts., Ypsilanti, Michigan
- Coordinates: 42°14′36″N 83°36′41″W
- Area: 240 acres (97 ha) and 125 acres (51 ha) (addition)
- Architect: Samuel C. Falkinburg; Jordan & Anderson
- Architectural style: Greek Revival, Queen Anne, Italian Villa, Late 19th And 20th Century Revivals, Bungalow/craftsman, Late Victorian
- NRHP reference No.: 78001515 (original); 88003055 (increase)

Significant dates
- Added to NRHP: April 11, 1978
- Boundary increase: January 5, 1989
- Designated MSHS: June 28, 1973

The Ypsilanti Historic District is a historic district located along several blocks on each side of the Huron River in the center of Ypsilanti, Michigan. The original portion of the district was designated a Michigan State Historic Site in 1973 and listed on the National Register of Historic Places in 1978; additions to the district were nationally listed in 1989.

== Extent ==
The Ypsilanti Historic District covers most of the older commercial sections of the city, as well as surrounding residential areas. The original, and largest, portion of the district extends roughly between Grove Street on the east, Hamilton Street on the west, Forest Avenue on the north, and Buffalo Street south. Three sections were added to the NRHP district in 1989: a northeast addition running along Forest, Oak, and Maple Streets extending east to Prospect Street, a southern addition running along South Adams between Ferris and Catherine Streets, and a western addition roughly extending the district west to Summit Street between Forest Street and Michigan Avenue. The district is the third largest historic district in the state.

== History ==
The city of Ypsilanti was founded in 1823, and became an important railroad stop when the line was built through the city in 1838. As Ypsilanti grew, a commercial district sprang up on the Detroit-Chicago Road (now Michigan Avenue). In the late 1840s, a second commercial district (now known as Depot Town) grew up a few blocks to the northeast, near the railroad depot. In 1851, a substantial fire destroyed a sizable portion of the Michigan Avenue business district. The structures were quickly rebuilt, and many of the 1850s buildings still exist in the heart of the historic district.

== Description ==
The core of the Ypsilanti Historic District contains approximately 400 contributing structures in two main areas. These are the commercial cores along Michigan Avenue and near the railroad depot on Cross Street (Depot Town). Huron Street, paralleling the river, links the two areas, and the structures around Huron Street are primarily residential in character. The residential structures include multiple examples of vernacular Greek Revival, Queen Anne, and brick Italianate houses. The commercial structures are substantially original two- and three-story brick structures.

The northeast addition is residential in character, containing primarily frame Greek Revival, Queen Anne, and Tudor Revival houses constructed in the late 19th and early 20th centuries. The addition has 63 contributing structures, including both modest single family residences and grander homes that once housed elite citizens of the community. The south addition contains another 12 contributing residential structures, for the most part modest frame houses. The western addition to the district includes a little over 300 contributing structures, most of them single family homes. Many of these have been converted to apartments or fraternity houses due to the proximity of Eastern Michigan University.
