= Track =

Track or Tracks may refer to:

== Routes or imprints ==
- Ancient trackway, any track or trail whose origin is lost in antiquity
- Animal track, imprints left on surfaces that an animal walks across
- Desire path, a line worn by people taking the shortest/most convenient route across fields, parks or woods
- Forest track, a track (unpaved road) or trail through a forest
- Fossil trackway, a type of trace fossil, usually preserving a line of animal footprints
- Trackway, an ancient route of travel or track used by animals
- Trail
- Vineyard track, a land estate (defined by law) meant for the growing of vine grapes

== Arts, entertainment, and media ==
=== Films ===
- Tracks (1922 film), an American silent Western film
- Tracks (1976 film), an American film starring Dennis Hopper
- Tracks (2003 film), an animated short film
- Tracks (2013 film), an Australian film starring Mia Wasikowska
- The Track (1975 film), a French thriller–drama film
- The Track (2025 film), a Canadian documentary film

=== Literature ===
- Tracks (novel), written by Native American author Louise Erdrich
- Tracks, a 1980 book by Australian writer Robyn Davidson, source of the 2013 film in the section above
- The Tracks, a young adult novel series by J. Gabriel Gates and Charlene Keel

=== Music ===
- Album track, a song or other unit of play on an album
- Soundtrack, recorded audio played in synchronisation with something
- Track Records, a record label founded in 1966 in London, England

==== Albums ====
- Tracks (Oscar Peterson album), 1970
- Tracks (Liverpool Express album), 1976
- Tracks (Bruce Springsteen album), 1998
- Tracks (Collin Raye album), 2000
- Tracks (Vasco Rossi album), 2002

==== Songs ====
- "Track #1", the original title of "Stinkfist", at the time of its release to avoid removal from the band Tool
- "Tracks", by Gary Numan on his album The Pleasure Principle
- "Tracks", by Juliana Hatfield on her album Wild Animals
- "Tracks", by Roam on their album Backbone

==== Music production ====
- Audio signal or Audio channel, recorded in a recording studio
- Music track, a recorded piece of music

=== Television ===
- "Tracks" (Law & Order: UK), a 2013 episode on the television series Law and Order: UK
- "Tracks", a 1999 episode of the television series Zoboomafoo
- "T.R.A.C.K.S.", an episode of Marvel TV show Agents of S.H.I.E.L.D.
- The Track (TV series), an Australian documentary television series

=== Other arts, entertainment, and media ===
- Tracks (magazine), an Australian surf magazine published since 1970
- Tracks (podcast), a British thriller-mystery fiction podcast released from 2016 to 2020
- Tracks – The Train Set Game, a 2017 video game developed by Whoop Games, commonly referred to as Tracks
- Track (game), also called The Power Game, a board game published in 1975
- Tracks (Transformers), a Transformers character

== Electronics and computing ==
- Track (optical disc), consecutive set of sectors on the disc containing a block of data
- Track (disk drive), a circular path on the surface of a disk or diskette on which information is recorded and read
- Tracks in magnetic stripe card
- Track (moving medium), a path on a recording medium

== Sport ==
- All-weather running track, a rubberized surface for track and field competitions
- Cinder track, generally a refined dirt running track for track and field competitions
- First tracks, in winter sports, cutting through fresh snow or ice before anyone else does
- List of bobsleigh, luge, and skeleton tracks
- Long track speed skating
- Race track, racing
- Tartan track, a brand of all-weather running track that has become genericized
- The Track (stadium), a multi-use stadium in Saint Sampson, Guernsey
- Track and field athletics
- Track cycling
- Velodrome, a track for bicycles, track cycling competitions

== Transportation ==
- Railway track, metal tracks on which trains ride
  - Track gauge, the distance between rails
- Bus track, a track for certain buses, like the O-Bahn buses
- Axle track, the distance between centres of roadwheels on an axle of a motor vehicle
- Continuous track, a belt providing motive traction for a tracked vehicle such as a tank or a bulldozer
- Track (navigation), the path a vessel or aircraft plots over the surface of the Earth
  - Ground track, the path on the surface of the Earth directly below an aircraft or satellite
  - Ocean track, in flight planning, the path of an aircraft as determined by heading, slip, and wind effects

== Other uses ==
- Conference track, a group of talks on a certain topic that are usually made in parallel with others
- Green track, a type of railway track in which the track bed and surrounding area are planted with grass turf or other vegetation as ground cover
- Tracks Inc (Tracks Dance Theatre), based in Darwin, Australia
- A recording of one song or piece of music

== See also ==
- Sidetrack (disambiguation)
- Sidetracked (disambiguation)
- TRAC (disambiguation)
- Track and trace
- Tracker (disambiguation)
- Tracking (disambiguation)
- Transnational Association of Christian Colleges and Schools (TRACCS)
- Trek (disambiguation)
- Trackx, an amphibious tracked armoured personnel carrier
