= Prospect Park (Ypsilanti, Michigan) =

Park in Ypsilanti, Michigan, US

Coordinates: 42°14′49″N 83°36′06″W

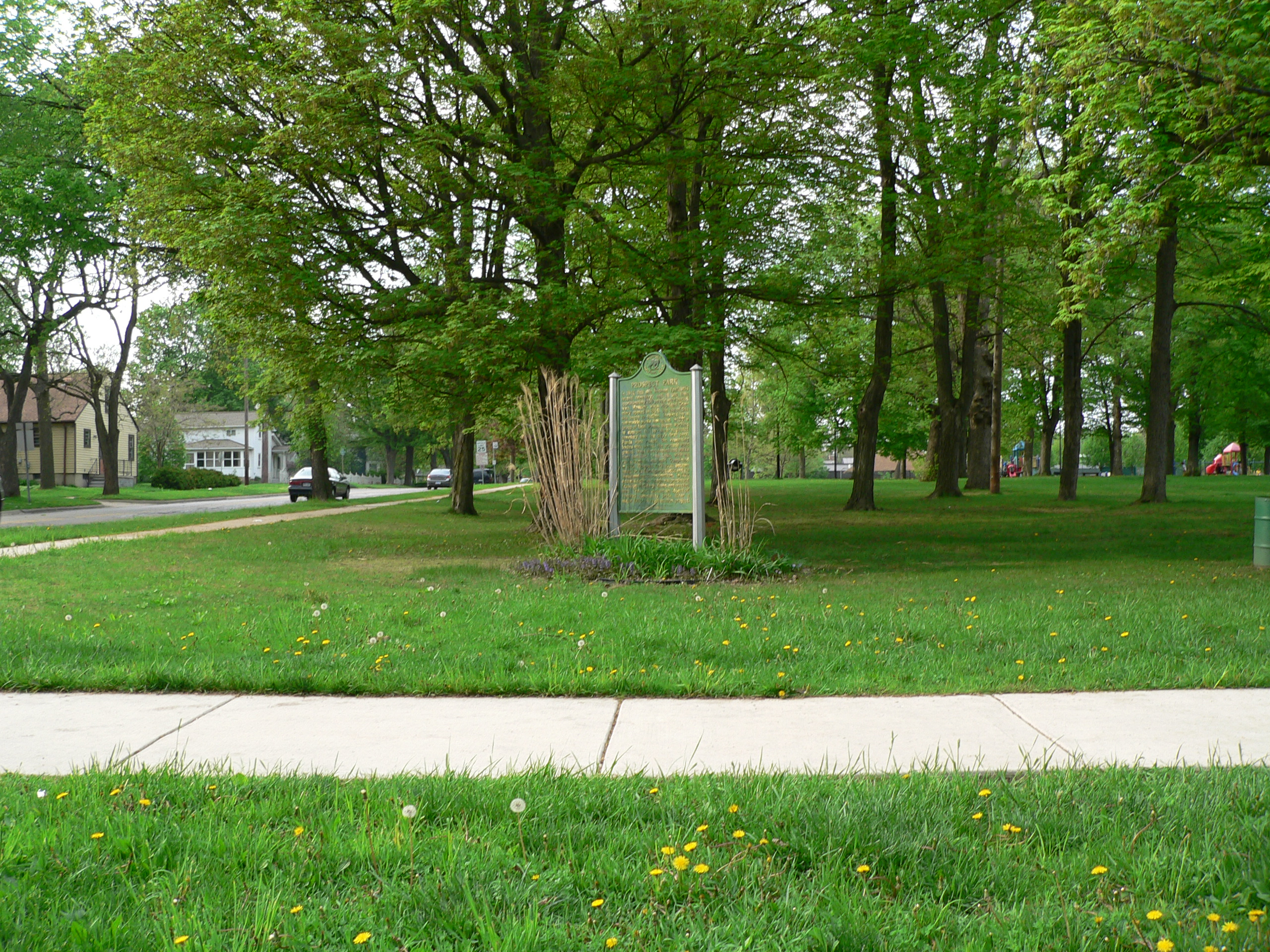
The Prospect Park historical marker, at the southwest corner of the park.

Prospect Park is a 9.5-acre park in the northeast corner of Ypsilanti, Michigan, and is the oldest park in Ypsilanti. This park, which was originally a cemetery, is the home of a retired coastal defense cannon from Maine, and is currently the home of the restored Luna Lake. The park is one block from Ypsilanti's historic Depot Town, where the YpsiFest and many car shows are hosted in the summer.

== History ==
The land that is today called Prospect Park began as Prospect Cemetery, Ypsilanti's second cemetery, in 1842. In 1864, Highland Cemetery opened just 1/2 mile away, and the use of Prospect Cemetery declined sharply. Beginning in 1891, a group of local women raised funds to move the bodies — around 250 — to Highland Cemetery and transform Prospect Cemetery into Prospect Park, complete with a lake (Luna Lake) with a fountain, a bandstand, and a dance pavilion. A coastal defense cannon was added in 1902, and the park underwent a noteworthy restoration in the early 1980s.

The park made international headlines in 2013 and 2014 after a series of pranks in which a person repeatedly defecated on the same playground slide over a several month period.

== Location ==
Located near the northeast corner of Ypsilanti, Prospect Park is bounded on the south by East Cross Street, on the west by North Prospect Road, on the north by Oak Street, and on the east by a row of houses which face Charles Street. The park has a small parking lot off East Cross Street, in the southeast corner of the park, next to The Bible Church.

== Features ==
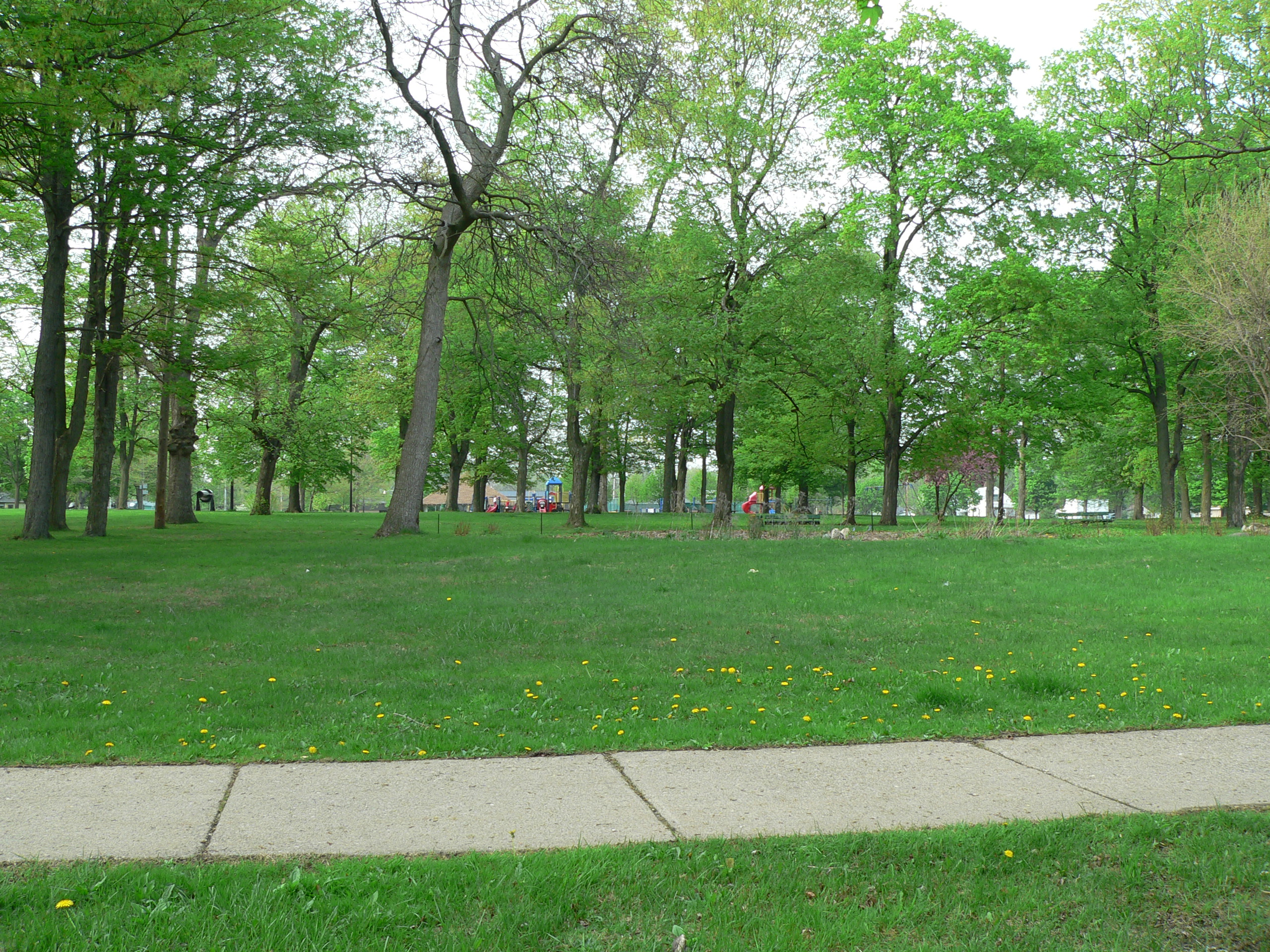

Prospect Park has many features including a cannon, basketball courts, a baseball field, a large area of open land used as a football field, playground equipment, a dance pavilion, and a bandstand. Other features include grills and picnic tables, and a small lake called Luna Lake. It also has a small community-made skateboarding park. There are two major sets of playground equipment, including slides, a few sets of monkey bars, ropes to walk on, and balance beams.

=== Cannon ===
The cannon at Prospect Park was cast in 1865 at West Point Foundry. After being cast, it was used as a coastal defense gun at Fort McClary in Maine. On October 13, 1902, it was set in place at Prospect Park. The mayor of Ypsilanti, Martin Dawson, learning that it was to be replaced, applied to get it for Carpenter Post of the G.A.R. The cannon weighs 26,820 lbs. and has a ten-inch barrel.

=== Luna Lake ===
Luna Lake is a small lake located on the south side of Prospect Park. In 2008, the lake was restored by area neighborhood associations. Area residents planted nearly 1,500 plants in and around the lake.

== Ypsilanti International Elementary School ==
Ypsilanti International Elementary School (commonly known as YIES, pronounced whyz) is an elementary school in the Ypsilanti Community Schools district. It is located next to Prospect Park, across Oak Street. The school was originally named Prospect Elementary School in the early 1900s. In 1963, the school was renamed in honor of Olive M. Adams who was the principal there for many years. In 2016, the school was renamed YIES and opened as an International Baccalaureate school. Students from the school use the park playground equipment at recess, during which access to Oak Street is closed.
