= Long track =

Long track may mean:

- Long track motorcycle racing
- Long track speed skating
- standard 400-metre running track
- P-40 radar, a Soviet 3-D UHF radar
- Long Tack Sam (1884–1961), a Chinese-born American magician and acrobat

== See also ==
- Track (disambiguation)
