= Carolyn King =

American baseball player

Carolyn King (born 1961) was one of the first girls ever to play Little League Baseball, and was the centerpiece in a landmark sexual discrimination lawsuit in 1974.

In 1973, Carolyn tried out for a spot in the Ypsilanti American Little League in Ypsilanti, Michigan, despite the fact that Little League had a rule that specifically prohibited girls from trying out. The league president allowed her to try out anyway, and after Carolyn beat out 15 boys for a starting position, the manager of the Orioles selected Carolyn for his team. When Little League International officials in Williamsport, Pennsylvania, found out about Carolyn's participation, they threatened to pull the Ypsilanti American Little League's charter if she took the field in a game.

Local Little League officials in Ypsilanti grudgingly decided to kick her off the Orioles, but the Ypsilanti City Council responded by saying that if Carolyn was prohibited from playing, the league couldn't use the city's fields. The local league relented, and on May 10, 1973, Carolyn took the field at Candy Cane Park as a member of the Orioles. The stands were packed with fans as television crews filmed one of the biggest events in Ypsilanti's history.

Little League International officials followed through on their threat to pull the Ypsilanti American Little League's charter, and in 1973, Carolyn and the City of Ypsilanti sued Little League, alleging discrimination. Little League won that case, but in 1974, officials in Williamsport saw the writing on the wall and decided to drop its no-girls rule. By 1975, girls were allowed to legally play Little League baseball.

Carolyn's story is the subject of a documentary film produced by Stunt3 Multimedia in Detroit, called The Girl in Centerfield. Due to the controversy, the 1973 all-star game between the rival Ypsilanti American and National league was not played ... until 2010, when the rosters were re-assembled as an Old-Timers' Day type event. Billed as "The Game That Never Was", the all-star tilt was finally played as part of the Ypsilanti Heritage Festival; Carolyn led off and played center field for the American League, leading them to a 15-14 victory.
