= Conviction (2010 film) =

- Theatrical release poster
- Directed by: Tony Goldwyn
- Written by: Pamela Gray; Richard LaGravenese (uncredited)
- Produced by: Andrew Sugerman; Andrew S. Karsch; Tony Goldwyn
- Starring: Hilary Swank; Sam Rockwell; Minnie Driver; Melissa Leo; Peter Gallagher; Juliette Lewis
- Cinematography: Adriano Goldman
- Edited by: Jay Cassidy
- Music by: Paul Cantelon
- Production companies: Omega Entertainment; Oceana Media Finance; Prescience
- Distributed by: Fox Searchlight Pictures
- Release dates: September 11, 2010 (TIFF); October 15, 2010 (United States)
- Running time: 107 minutes
- Country: United States
- Language: English
- Budget: $12.5 million
- Box office: $11.1 million

Conviction is a 2010 American biographical legal drama film directed by Tony Goldwyn, written by Pamela Gray, and starring Hilary Swank and Sam Rockwell. The film premiered on September 11, 2010, at the Toronto International Film Festival and was released in the US on October 15, 2010.

== Plot ==
Kenny and Betty Anne Waters were children of an indifferent mother. Forced to fend for themselves, they were very close before they were eventually sent to separate foster homes. Now a wife and mother of two sons, Betty Anne's life is still centered on her brother, who had a troubled youth and is currently serving a life sentence in prison.

Kenny was initially taken in for questioning by Sergeant Nancy Taylor over the murder of his next-door neighbor, Katherina Reitz Brow on May 21, 1980, in Ayer, Massachusetts. He was released, but two years later, based on new testimony presented by Taylor from his ex-wife Brenda, and ex-girlfriend Roseanna, he was arrested and tried. The evidence presented at Kenny's trial is circumstantial, but coupled with limited blood-typed evidence, he is convicted of first degree murder and sentenced to life imprisonment without parole.

When Betty Ann discovers that Kenny tried to commit suicide three years into his sentence, she decides to go back to school and become a lawyer so she can exonerate him. Her husband is skeptical and unsupportive, and eventually they split up and divorce. When her schedule takes time away from her sons, they decide to live with their father. Struggling in school, demoralized and exhausted, Betty Anne stops going to classes, until Abra, a classmate, motivates her to continue.

Betty Anne realizes that the new field of DNA testing could be the key to overturning Kenny's conviction, as only blood types had been matched at the time of the trial. She contacts attorney Barry Scheck from the Innocence Project. The backlog of cases will mean waiting at least 18 months, unless she can pass the bar exam and find the blood evidence to have it tested. She passes the bar exam, but is then told the evidence was destroyed six years earlier.

Refusing to give up, Betty Anne learns that Nancy Taylor was fired from the police department for attempting to frame another officer, and when she and Abra travel to the Boston courthouse and plead with the supervisor to look through the evidence, it is found. The DNA results come back and establish that the blood was not Kenny's. Betty Anne and Kenny are overjoyed anticipating his release, but District Attorney Martha Coakley refuses to vacate the conviction, claiming that there was still enough evidence to convict Kenny as an accomplice. Kenny is convinced that the authorities will find a way to keep him in prison to avoid admitting their mistake, but Scheck advises Betty Ann that their discovery not only proves Kenny's innocence, but also that the main witnesses against him were lying.

Betty Anne, Abra, and Scheck visit the two main trial witnesses, Kenny's ex-wife and his ex-girlfriend. Both tearfully confess that Sergeant Taylor coerced them into perjuring themselves at Kenny's trial. Kenny's conviction is vacated and he is freed from prison in June 2001. Betty Anne is able to persuade his teenage daughter that he never stopped trying to reach out to her while he was in prison, so Kenny is finally able to be reunited with his daughter, as well as with his sister and her sons.

The epilogue states that Betty Anne continues to work with the Innocence Project to prevent wrongful convictions.

Note: Betty Anne also won a major settlement against Nancy Taylor and the Ayer police department, although Taylor was immune from criminal prosecution due to the statute of limitations. In 2025 further DNA testing identified Joseph Leo Boudreau as the one who committed the murder (Boudreau had passed away in 2004). (Note: In June 2025, Joseph Leo Boudreau (1937–2004) was identified as the killer when DNA results positively matched the blood stain to him.)

== Cast ==
- Hilary Swank as Betty Anne Waters
  - Bailee Madison as Young Betty Anne Waters
- Sam Rockwell as Kenny Waters
- Minnie Driver as Abra Rice
- Ele Bardha as Don
- Melissa Leo as Nancy Taylor
- Ari Graynor as Mandy Marsh
- Loren Dean as Rick Miller
- Karen Young as Elizabeth Waters
- Jennifer G. Roberts as Martha Coakley
- Clea DuVall as Brenda Marsh
- Juliette Lewis as Roseanna Perry
- Peter Gallagher as Barry Scheck

== Production ==
Production began in February 2009, in Dexter, Michigan. Filming also took place in Ann Arbor, Jackson, Howell, Pinckney, Chelsea and Ypsilanti. In Ypsilanti, filming took place in the historic Depot Town at a restaurant called Sidetrack Bar & Grill. In Howell, filming took place at the Livingston County Courthouse, along Dearborn Street at Cole's Elevator, and at the Howell Village Market (formerly Sefa's Super Market). The script was written by Pamela Gray. The poster was released June 21, 2010.

== Music ==
The film score was composed by composer Paul Cantelon.

The end title song is "Heaven & Hell" by Cantelon's band, Wild Colonials. The song is a re-recording of the track that first appeared on their debut album, Fruit of Life and was released as a stand-alone single at the time of the film's release.

== Reception ==
Review aggregator Rotten Tomatoes reports that 67% of critics have given the film a positive review based on 191 reviews, with an average score of 68%. The critical consensus reads "Less compelling – and more manipulative – than it should be, Conviction benefits from its compelling true story and a pair of solid performances from Swank and Rockwell." Another review aggregator Metacritic assigned the film a weighted average score of 61 out of 100, indicating "generally favorable" reviews.

Martha Coakley, Attorney General of the Commonwealth of Massachusetts, who was portrayed in the film, commented after seeing a pre-screening on October 12, 2010, that it was a compelling film but there were legal inaccuracies and temporal exaggerations. Family members of Katharina Brow, the murder victim, have criticized the film company and Hilary Swank for failing to consult the family on the movie's depiction of their mother.

=== Accolades ===
Year	Award	Category	Nominee	Result
2010	Broadcast Film Critics Association Awards	Best Supporting Actor	Sam Rockwell	Nominated
2010	Screen Actors Guild Awards	Outstanding Performance by a Female Actor in a Leading Role	Hilary Swank	Nominated
2010	Boston Society of Film Critics Awards	Best Supporting Actress	Juliette Lewis	Won

== See also ==
- List of wrongful convictions in the United States
- "Testilying"
