= Michigan ElvisFest =

Cultural festival

- Status: active
- Genre: cultural festival
- Frequency: Annually
- Location: Depot Town
- Coordinates: 42.245961°N 83.609143°W
- Country: United States
- Years active: 26–27
- Inaugurated: 1999
- Website: www.mielvisfest.org/index.htm

The Michigan ElvisFest is an annual two-day festival occurring each July in Riverside Park and Depot Town in Ypsilanti, Michigan, devoted to celebrating singer and actor Elvis Presley.

== History ==
The Michigan ElvisFest was founded in 1999. Started by Elvis tribute artists Matt King and Sherman Arnold in cooperation with the Ypsilanti Depot Town Association, to celebrate the music and the influence of Elvis Presley and replace the previous Ypsilanti based music festival, the Bob Marley Festival. Since then, it has grown to be the largest Elvis festival in North America, attended by approximately 20,000 fans each year.

With the 2020 ElvisFest cancelled as the COVID-19 pandemic was to blame, the 22nd was deferred to 2021.

== Events ==
The main attractions at the Michigan ElvisFest are the Elvis Tribute Artists, but other tributes are also common, including tributes related artists such as Tom Jones and Roy Orbison. Other attractions include a salute to the military, a children's area and a candlelight vigil in memory of the life of Elvis Presley.

== Fundraising at the festival ==
The Michigan ElvisFest has been working closely with Ypsilanti Meals on Wheels.
