= Depot Town =

Commercial area of Ypsilanti

Coordinates: 42.245961°N 83.609143°W

A map of the principal buildings in Depot Town.

Depot Town is a commercial area, with some residences above storefronts, in Ypsilanti, Michigan's historic district. Depot Town proper consists of East Cross Street from the Huron River to North River Street, and a small area on the 300-block of North River Street. However, several blocks in the surrounding area are also commonly referred to as part of Depot Town. These areas include Riverside Park, Frog Island Park (both of which are on the Huron River), and River Street extending north and south for several blocks. First established in the late 1830s, most of the buildings standing today were constructed between 1850 and 1880. Over the years, Depot Town has included hotels, an Underground Railroad station, an American Civil War barracks, and a building that has housed a bar and restaurant continuously for more than 150 years, switching to soft drinks during Prohibition. Today the area is dominated by restaurants and stores. Depot Town also hosts several large summer festivals each year, as well as weekly bike nights and cruise nights.

== History ==
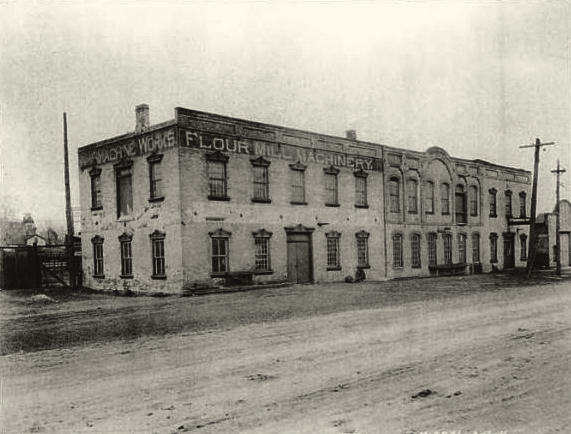
In the 19th century

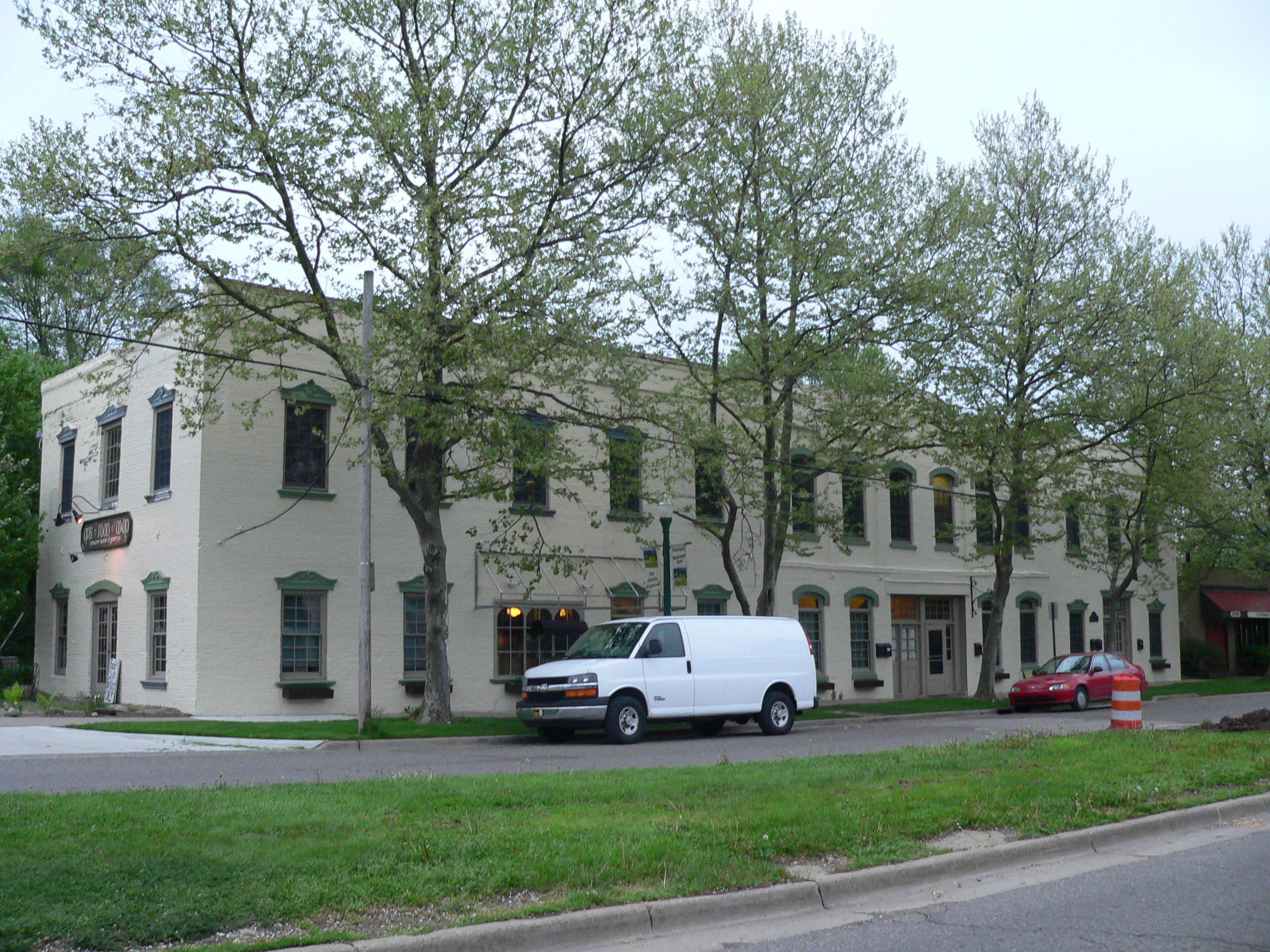
In 2011

The Mill Works Building now houses the Ypsilanti Food Co-op and the River Street Bakery.

Depot Town was created after the Ypsilanti Train Depot was opened in 1838. As the railroad connected Ypsilanti, MI with Detroit, the area surrounding the depot grew. The commercial community known as Depot Town was built over the thirty years following the arrival of the railroad, and most of the buildings standing today were built from 1850 to 1880. In the early years, Depot Town included a flour mill, a large farmers' store, an iron foundry, a fire department, a clothing store, and paved streets. Ypsilanti's original city hall and jail were built just across the Huron River from Depot Town on West Cross Street. As the depot was built one mile north of the Chicago Road (now Michigan Avenue), the community of Ypsilanti was split between competing locations.

One of the earliest developments of note in Depot Town was the Western Hotel, built by Mark Norris. Opening in May 1839, the Western Hotel stood on a triangular plot west of River Street and north of the railroad track. Around 1860, the Michigan Central Railroad bought the land to replace the old wood plank depot with a newer, more modern brick depot. Norris demolished his hotel and carried the bricks across River Street, where he built a three-story Italianate structure, which became known as the Norris Block.

In early 1860, Depot Town experienced a large fire, which spread sparks so far that a barn one-third of a mile away was destroyed.

I've been told by two interesting people of those days about a couple of sales that were made at the Depot. One was when Denny Doyle sold the Follett House. It seems that business had fallen off quite a lot. Denny wanted to sell the place so he heard about a fellow by the name of Mathias who was looking for a tavern so he invited him to Ypsilanti to take a look at the Follett House. Denny was a little bit unscrupulous in his business actions but he got a group of fellows to go to Ann Arbor with suit cases and another group to go down to Wayne and when the Michigan Central train came in these fellows flocked into the Follett House to register and stay over night. Mathias was sitting in the lobby and he looked over the crowd and just then the train came in from the other way and these fellows he had sent to Wayne came in. Well, the bar was doing business and the barber shop was doing business and Mathias was mesmerized by the amount of business he anticipated so he bought the place; and didn't they sell him another place up in the Thompson Building for an overflow of his patrons. Well, he paid his money and he owned the hotel and Doyle was gone.

— Joseph H. Thompson

Tunnels, originally built for water drainage, passed beneath the railroad and ran between the Thompson Block and the businesses on Cross Street, and were used as hiding places by escaped slaves, who hid by day and then rode boats down the Huron River by night. Leonard Chase, a known abolitionist, also operated a station on the Underground Railroad from 1841 to 1860, hiding escaped slaves in his home near the depot. Also during the American Civil War, the Norris Block was used as a barracks by two regiments: the Fourteenth Michigan Infantry Regiment in early 1862, and the Twenty-Seventh Michigan Infantry Regiment in 1863. Oliver E. Thompson bought the building in 1869, and as it passed down through several generations of the Thompson family, it eventually became known as the Thompson Block.

The Michigan Central Depot was widely known for the gardens which surrounded it. The longtime gardener, John Laidlaw, built enormous arrangements that evoked Niagara Falls, the battleship Maine, and well-known landscapes.

By the 1950s, railroad traffic declined and parts of Depot Town began to fall into disrepair. The Thompson Block was put up for sale in 1950, standing vacant for more than a year. A series of businesses opened and closed in the building, with none finding lasting success. In the late 1960s, landlord David Kircher bought the building, using it as a warehouse. From 1996 until 2005, the building was tied up in legal disputes. Kircher was found guilty of demolition by neglect, and first Barnes and Barnes and then Beal Properties were named receivers. In May 2006, Stewart Beal purchased the building outright.

Amtrak passenger trains continued to stop in Depot Town until the early 1980s, ending round trip stops in 1982, with the eastbound train, the Michigan Executive, making its last Ypsilanti stop in 1984. In the March 2016, local, state and federal officials formally began the process of proposing the return of Amtrak service to Depot Town. The city council approved $2 million toward the construction of a platform adjacent to the Maple Street parking lot which would be served by Wolverine service, with possible future use by the proposed Ann Arbor–Detroit Regional Rail between Ann Arbor and Detroit. The earliest service could begin would be December 2017. Early preparation for the reintroduction of service has included the closing of two railroad crossings at Park and Groves streets in July 2016.

== Structures ==
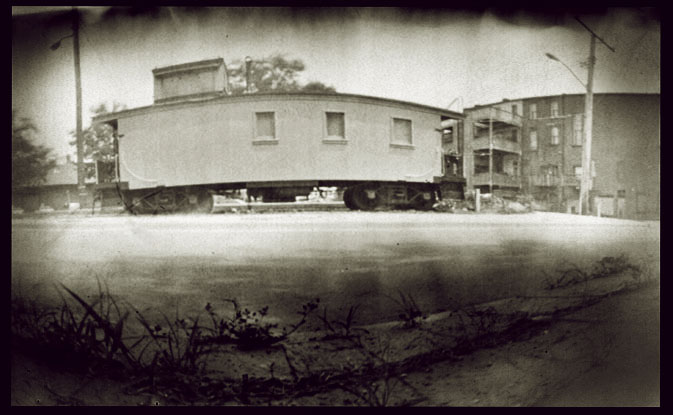
A caboose sits in the freighthouse courtyard.

The original Michigan Central Depot, from which the area took its name, no longer stands, but it was between the northeast side of the tracks and the west side of River Street, directly across from the freighthouse, since replaced by a parking lot. The freighthouse, built in 1878, does still stand, and the area immediately around the freighthouse is home to the Depot Town Farmers' Market, one of two farmers' markets in Ypsilanti. Also in the freighthouse courtyard, a caboose sits parallel to Rice Street.

The freighthouse was closed in 2004 due to safety concerns. In early 2009, the city of Ypsilanti and the Friends of the Ypsilanti Freighthouse received more than $600,000 (~$850,136 in 2024) for repairs to make the freighthouse usable again.

Architecturally, the [Thompson Block]'s historical significance is quite apparent. Built in the mid 18th century, the building is an excellent example of the typical downtown building block (here freestanding) with retail on the first floor and dwellings/storage on the upper floors. The masonry brick and wood beam construction was built using bricks from the Great Western Hotel that was torn down to make room for the railroad tracks. The Italianate style with arched fenestration and intricate wooden frieze was particularly popular at that time and can be observed in the few remaining buildings in Ypsilanti from that time period. Its subsequent rehabilitation and preservation would be a great asset and historical resource for not only the citizens of Ypsilanti but also an excellent example of Midwestern architecture from the 1800s for the entire country.

— Craig Zehnder, 1992 research report

At the northeast corner of Cross and River Streets stands the Thompson Block, a historic building which was used as barracks in the Civil War. The Thompson Block suffered a bad fire early in the morning on September 23, 2009, and the temporary supports reaching into adjacent streets, installed shortly after the fire to stabilize the structure, blocked westbound traffic on Cross Street for more than three months and have resulted in legal tussles between the city and the property owner.

At the southwest corner of the same intersection, the building housing Sidetrack Bar & Grill—which has held a bar and restaurant continuously since at least 1850—has an unusual shape resulting from a 1929 train derailment. On an early January morning, the twelfth car, laden with lumber, of an 85-car freight train came off the tracks and crashed into the corner of the building. The owner of the building, who lived just above the section that was hit, was uninjured but had most of her personal effects scattered into the street. There were only a few people near the railroad crossing when it derailed including an 18-year-old female who was knocked unconscious and a man who was sitting in his car, but was able to get away unharmed. When the current owners went to build a patio on the spot, they found some of the debris had been piled up underneath, which made it more difficult to dig post holes. In 1931, the entrance to the building was moved from the east side to its current position on the north side to accommodate a post-prohibition law requiring bar entrances to be at least 500 feet from any church. The back patio was constructed after the nearby church burned down. According to Sidetrack owner Linda French, the first-floor walls are three bricks deep, with the oldest remaining bricks dating to the 1850s.

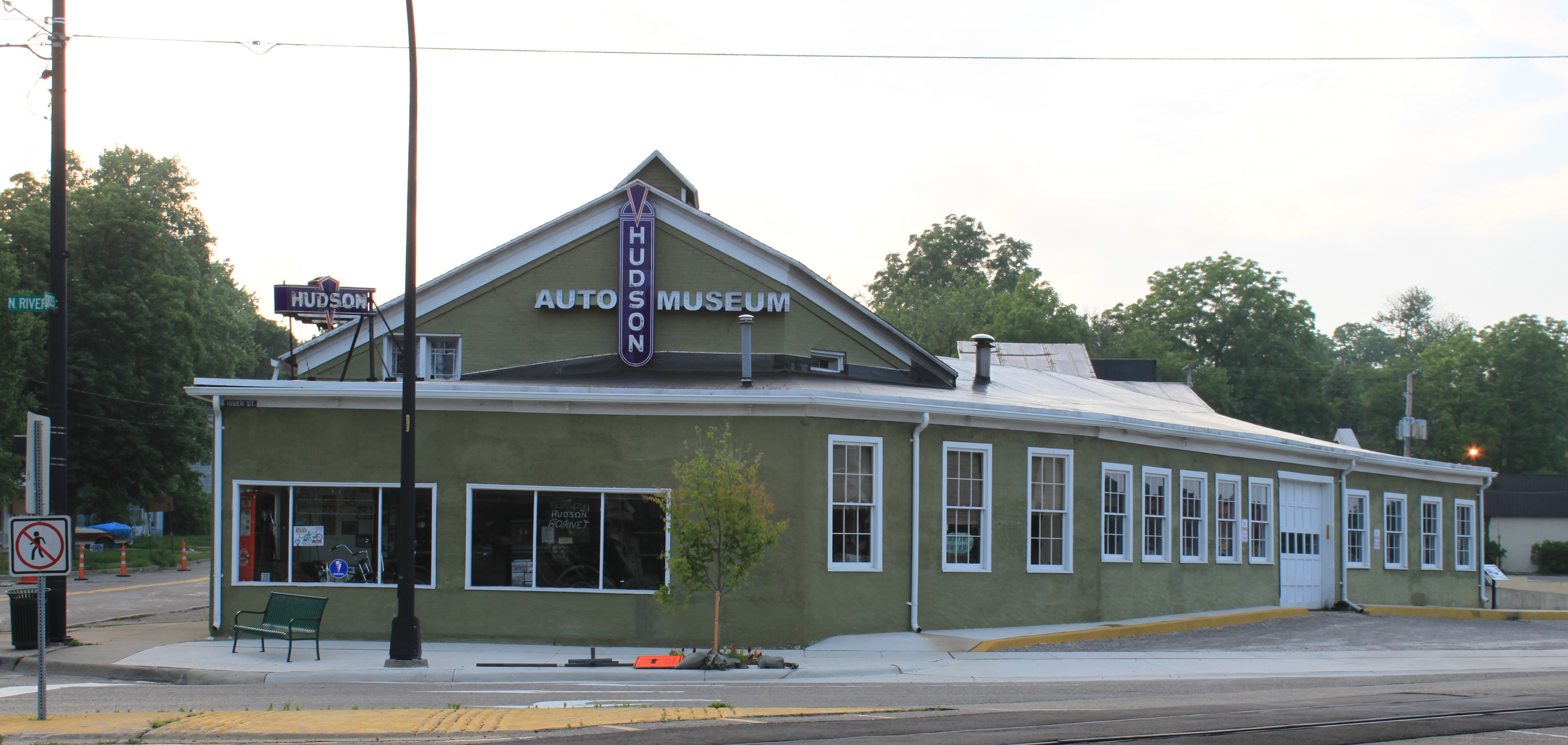
The Ypsilanti Automotive Heritage Museum building houses the last surviving Hudson dealership.

At the southeast corner of Cross and River Streets, the Ypsilanti Automotive Heritage Museum is housed in the last Hudson Motor Car Company dealership. In 1927 the business opened as "Hudson Sales & Service", becoming "Miller Motors" in 1955. After the discontinuance of the Hudson brand in 1958, Miller Motors continued as a service and parts supplier for Hudson collectors.

On the east side of River Street, south from the Ypsilanti Automotive Heritage Museum across the railroad tracks, the Mill Works Building, originally a foundry, contains the Ypsilanti Food Co-op and the River Street Bakery, owned by the co-op. On the roof of the Mill Works Building, Solar Ypsi installed 12 solar panels for the co-op in April 2009, followed by 30 panels for the bakery in 2010, producing a total of 8.3 kilowatts during peak sunlight. Data from the meters can be viewed at the Solar Ypsi website, allowing anyone to compare generation from different sites.

Most of the buildings in Depot Town are two or three stories. At the east end, the Ypsilanti Automotive Heritage Museum building is a single story. East of Rice Street, the building facing Cross Street from the north is four stories, while the freighthouse behind it is a single tall story. Toward the west end of Depot Town, on both sides of Cross Street, there are several one-story structures, which are of more-recent construction than the taller buildings.

== Vicinity ==
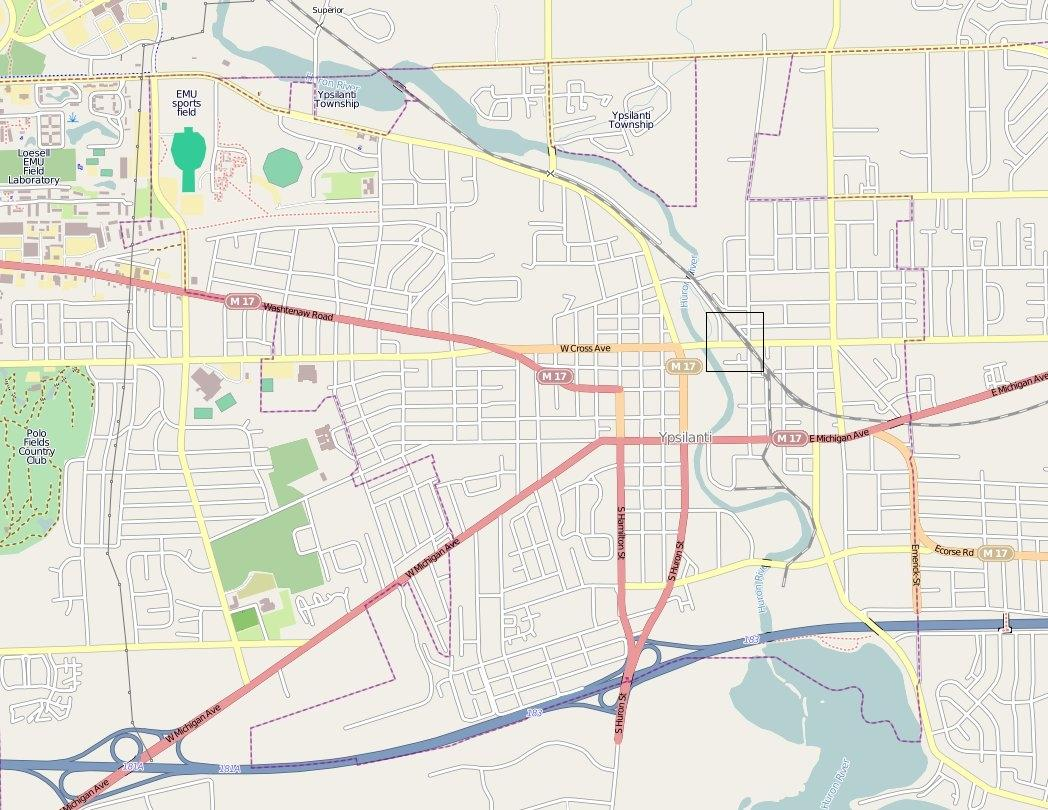
The location of Depot Town within Ypsilanti.

Depot Town is immediately northeast of downtown Ypsilanti. Frog Island and Riverside Parks, both on the Huron River, are immediately to the west of Depot Town, and are often informally considered part of the district. A three-way bridge, known as the "tridge", links the two parks and Depot Town over the Huron River. Just beyond Riverside Park, the Michigan Firehouse Museum is at the corner of Cross Street and Huron Street. Prospect Park, the oldest park in Ypsilanti, is a half-mile east of Depot Town on Cross Street. The Corner Brewery, just north of Depot Town, is also commonly associated with the district, and Highland Cemetery is a half-mile north of Depot Town on River Street.

Depot Town is also a half-mile southeast of the campus of Eastern Michigan University. During "New Student Orientation", Eastern provides students with gift certificates called "Ypsibucks", which can be used at many restaurants in Depot Town and downtown Ypsilanti. Students use the day, known as "Ypsifest", to walk around the city and become acquainted with Ypsilanti.

== Businesses ==
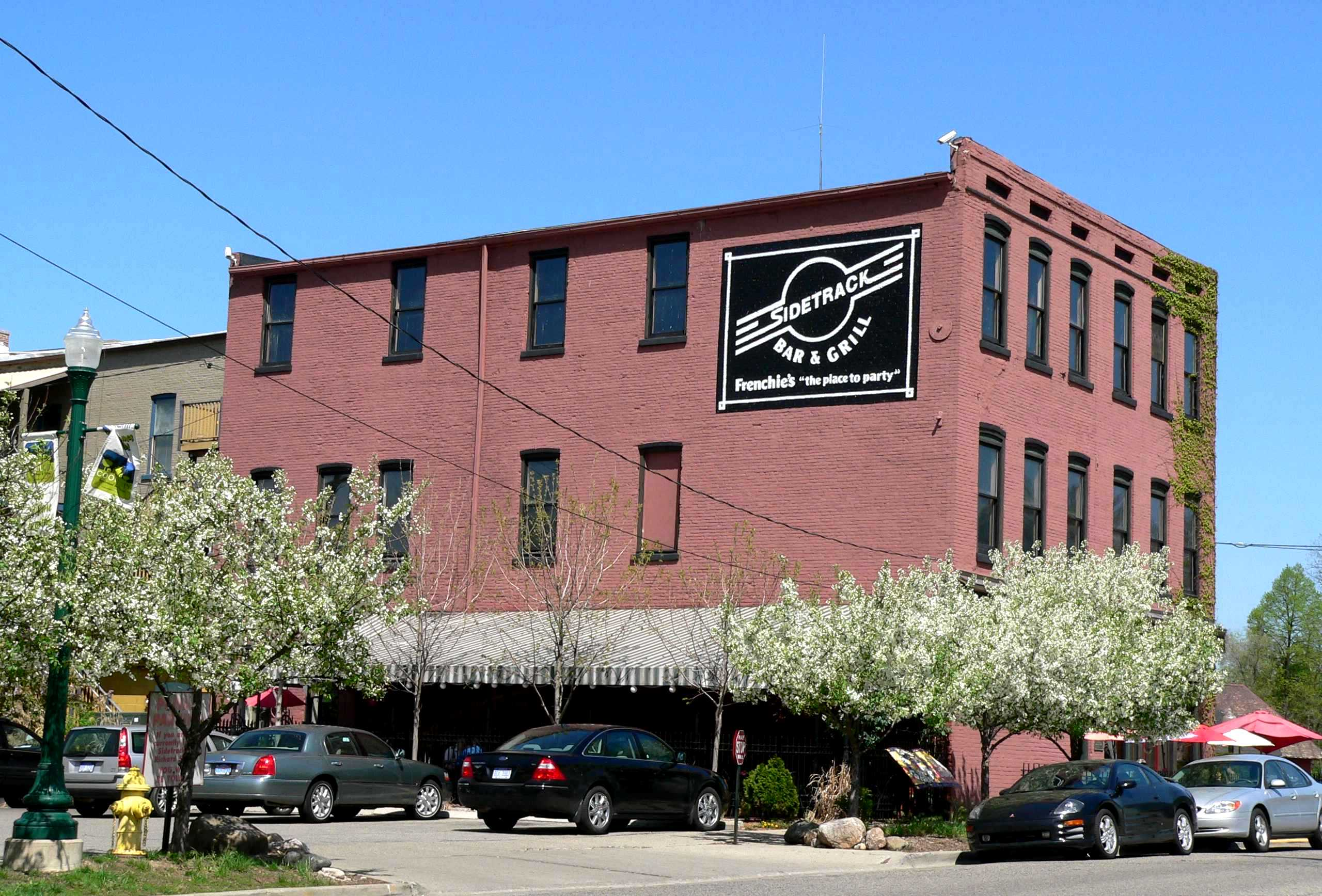
Sidetrack Bar & Grill in Depot Town.

In addition to antique stores, a Michigan artisan market (The Eyrie), tattoo parlor, record shop, fly fishing store, one of Ypsilanti's two farmers' markets & a variety of services including massage therapy, Russian ballet instruction, and motorcycle/auto repair; Depot Town is home to several well-known restaurants. Depot Town's newest restaurant MAIZ Mexican Cantina opened June 2014 serving fresh from scratch Mexican fare complementing the other institutions on Cross St. Sidetrack Bar & Grill has occupied the southwest corner of the River Street-Cross Street intersection since 1980, while Aubree's Saloon is in the last building on the north side of Cross Street. The Ypsilanti Food Co-op, established in 1975, moved into the Mill Works Building in the 1980s and in addition to groceries, sells sandwiches, salads, soups, and fresh bread from the bakery next door.

The River Street Bakery, also in the Mill Works Building and now owned by the Co-op, claims to have the only wood-fired brick oven in commercial use in Washtenaw County. Originally called the Depot Town Sourdough Bakery, the bakery was founded by Tom Kinney as an independent cooperative non-profit with a $20,000 loan from the Cooperative Whole Grain Education Association and pledges from prospective customers. To stretch the limited funds, the brick oven was built by hand in 1989. From the beginning, the Ypsilanti Food Co-op retailed the bread.

The Ypsilanti Automotive Heritage Museum is housed in the world's last surviving Hudson Motor Car Company dealership, across the street from the Thompson Block.

The Depot Town Farmers' Market, one of Ypsilanti's two farmers' markets, began near downtown in 1919, moving several times before settling in the freighthouse in the late 1970s. Inside the freighthouse, the market operated year-round, and included a coffee shop and frequent live music. Since the 2004 closure of the freighthouse due to structural concerns, the farmers' market has operated seasonally only, in the courtyard just outside the freighthouse.

== Events ==
Due to Michigan's cold winter, the majority of Depot Towns events are held from late March to early October. There are many events that take place in and around Depot Town such as the Michigan Brewers Guild Summer Beer Festival, Michigan ElvisFest, the Ypsilanti Heritage Festival, Tuesday "bike" night, and Thursday "cruise nights". Depot Town is also home to vintage car shows, concert band, jazz band, orchestra concerts, and an annual dog parade.

=== Summer Beer Festival ===
The Michigan Brewers Guild Summer Beer Festival, established in 1997, is held in Riverside Park on the fourth Saturday (and the Friday evening before) of July. Beginning in 2008, the Brewers Guild set a goal to operate its beer festivals as "zero-waste" events. They work closely with local recycling and composting companies, such as Recycle Ann Arbor, to manage the removal of any plastic, aluminum, paper, and food waste to ensure that as much of it as possible is recycled, composted, or used as animal feed. This has been achieved by requiring vendors to biodegradable plates and flatware. Also, unlike many such events, the festival is self-supporting without any outside sponsors.

In 2010, the festival drew about 9,000 attendees, despite "sweltering heat, torrential downpours, an overflowing Huron River, power blackouts and the possibility of tornadoes". Fifty-four Michigan breweries served around 350 different beers that year.

=== Michigan ElvisFest ===
Founded in 1999, the Michigan ElvisFest is an annual two-day festival held in July in Riverside Park and Depot Town. Established to replace the previous Ypsilanti-based music festival, the Bob Marley Festival, ElvisFest has grown to be the largest Elvis festival in North America, attended by approximately 10,000 fans each year. In addition to Elvis impersonators, ElvisFest also often includes performances by Tom Jones and Roy Orbison impersonators.

=== Ypsilanti Heritage Festival ===
Held each year on the last weekend of August, the Ypsilanti Heritage Festival sprawls across Frog Island Park, Riverside Park, Depot Town, and downtown Ypsilanti. The festival includes events such as vintage base ball, a bed race, a hot dog eating contest, a rubber duck race, and the "Nightmare Cruise" (a spoof of the Woodward Dream Cruise from Pontiac to Detroit).

=== Orphan Car Show ===
Each summer since 1997, Riverside Park hosts the Orphan Car Show. The show includes a parade and presentations by automotive historians about defunct car brands. Discontinued models of ongoing brands are accepted if they were made in Ypsilanti, and foreign vehicles are allowed if they are no longer sold in the United States.
