= Ypsilanti Food Co-op =

Food co-op

- Type: Food cooperative
- Industry: Retail grocery
- Founded: 1975
- Headquarters: Ypsilanti, Michigan
- Products: Natural and organic food, sustainable household and gardening products
- Members: +/- 1000
- Number of employees: +/- 40
- Iron Foundry/Ypsilanti Machine Works
- U.S. Historic district – Contributing property
- Built: ca. 1840
- Part of: Ypsilanti Historic District (ID78001515)
- Added to NRHP: April 11, 1978
- Website: www.ypsifoodcoop.org

The Ypsilanti Food Co-op is a food cooperative located in Ypsilanti, Michigan. Located in historic Depot Town, it is Michigan's only solar-powered grocery store. Also owned by the co-op is the River Street Bakery, which features the only wood-fired brick oven in commercial use in Washtenaw County. The Ypsilanti Food Co-op, in turn, is owned by its membership and governed by its board of directors. The shared building also is home to two beehives that are part of the Local Honey Project, managed by members, and they live in the adjacent called "Honeybee Alley".

The co-op is a member of the National Cooperative Grocers Association. It is Ypsilanti's primary host of events concerning sustainability, ecology, and food-related issues; in addition, it is a sponsor of and promotes external activities such as Ypsilanti's farmers' markets and other local-food initiatives. The co-op provides card-reader services for both Ypsilanti farmers' markets, allowing all vendors to accept payment by credit card, as well as EBT/Snap cards.

== History ==
The Ypsilanti Food Co-op was founded in 1975 on Sheridan St between Elm and Oakwood and is now located at 312 N. River Street in Ypsilanti's Depot Town neighborhood. The Mill Works Building, in which the co-op resides, was originally a foundry that made wheels for grinding flour.

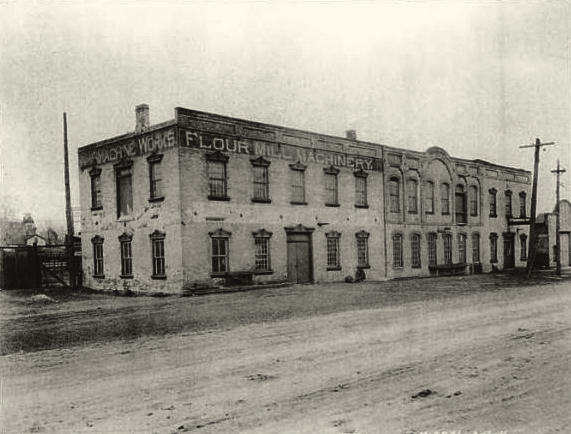
The Mill Works Building in the 19th Century

The food coop became Michigan's only solar-powered grocery store when a volunteer group, called Solar Ypsi, installed solar panels in 2005.

== Structure and governance ==
=== Food cooperative ===
As a cooperative, the Ypsilanti Food Co-op follows the 7 Cooperative Principles and offers natural foods, with an emphasis on organic and locally-grown and -made produce and groceries. Unlike a common corporation, decisions about how to run the Ypsilanti Food Co-op are not made by outside shareholders, and it is therefore able to manifest a higher degree of social responsibility than its corporate analogues. Much of the revenue made by the co-op is re-cycled into the local economy because of its many local vendor partnerships.

=== Ownership ===
The co-op is owned by its members, of which there are approximately 1000; it is directed by its general manager, who is in turn overseen by the co-op's board of directors. Co-op members receive a weekly newsletter, voting rights for the Board of Directors election, and a small discount on most retail items in the store. An additional discount may be earned by members who choose to volunteer labor in or on behalf of the store.

=== Board of directors ===
The board of directors has seven members, elected to two-year terms by co-op members. The Ypsilanti Food Co-op's board meets at least quarterly, and is charged with the oversight of co-op policy, governance, and trajectory.

=== Staff ===
A paid staff of approximately thirty is employed by the co-op, with occasional assistance from volunteers.

== See also ==
- List of food cooperatives
