= Penny Chapman =

Australian television producer

Penny Chapman is an Australian television producer. Her work includes the award-winning Brides of Christ, RAN Remote Area Nurse and My Place.

Penny received the Maura Fay Award for Services to the Industry at the 2013 Screen Producers Australia Awards.

== Partial filmography (as producer) ==
- Secret Weapon (1990)
- Come in Spinner (1990)
- Brides of Christ (1991)
- Children of the Dragon (1992)
- The Leaving of Liverpool (1992)
- Seven Deadly Sins (1992)
- Joh's Jury (1992)
- Blackfellas (1993)
- Dallas Doll (1993)
- Blue Murder (1995)
- Bordertown (1995)
- The Track (2000)
- The Road from Coorain (2001)
- Temptation (2002)
- The Cooks (2004)
- RAN Remote Area Nurse (2005)
- Rampant, How a City Stopped a Plague (2007)
- Darwin's Lost Paradise (2009)
- The Slap (2011)
- Sex, An Unnatural History (2011)
- Leaky Boat (2011)
- The Straits (2012
