= Fabulous Hudson Hornet =

Retired NASCAR Grand National Series and AAA stock car campaigned between 1952-1954

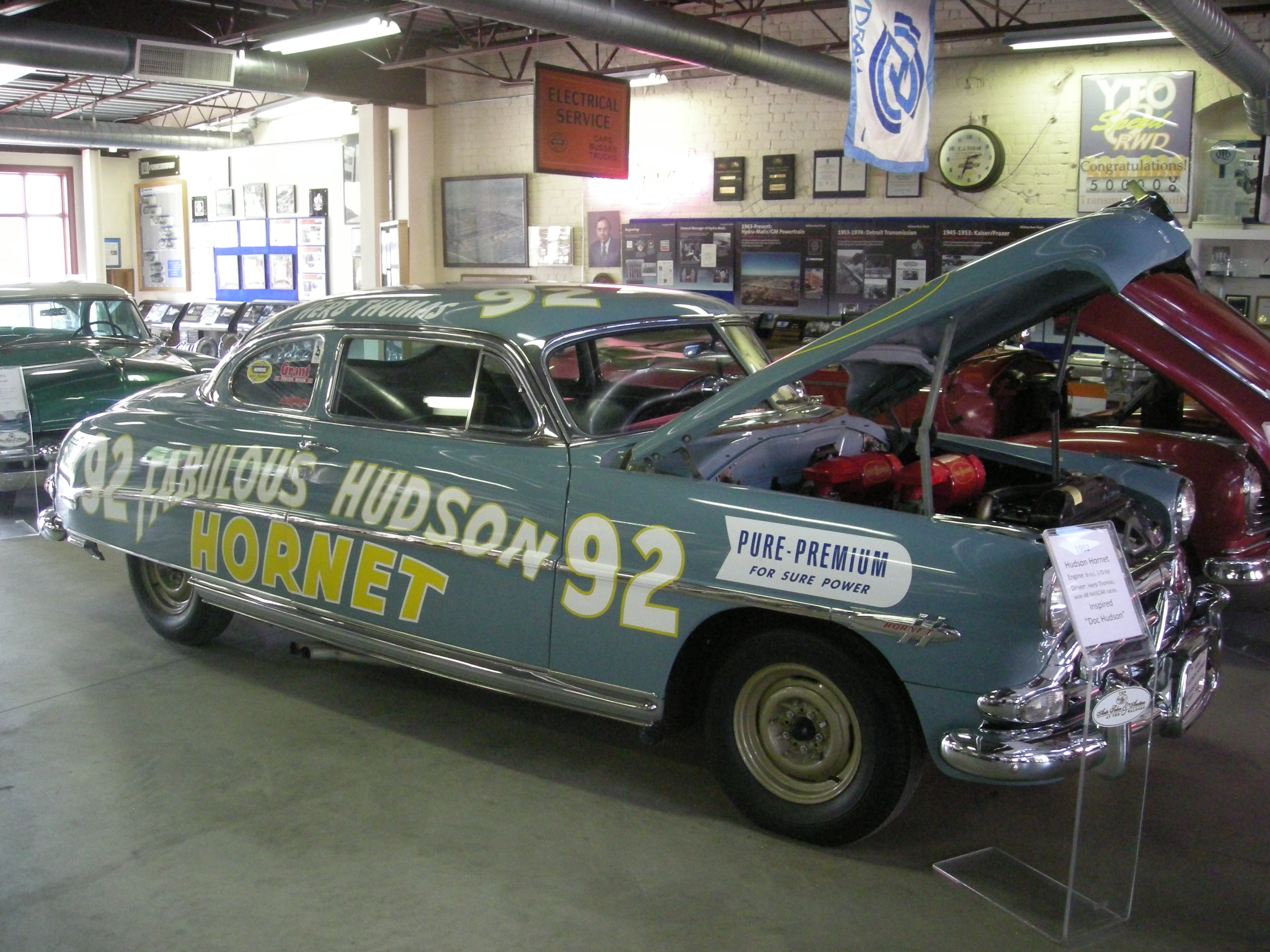
1952 Hudson Hornet stock car at the Ypsilanti Automotive Heritage Museum

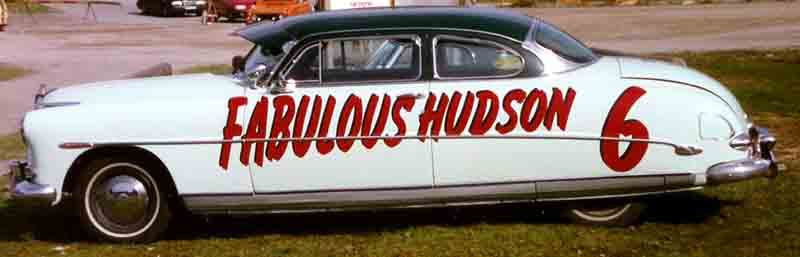
Nathan's Fabulous Hudson Hornet

The Fabulous Hudson Hornet is a famous NASCAR Grand National Series and AAA stock car campaigned during the early 1950s that was produced by the Hudson Motor Car Company. Several drivers, including Marshall Teague and Herb Thomas, drove Hudson Hornets that were nicknamed the "Fabulous Hudson Hornet". The Hudson Hornet had an outsized impact on stock car racing.

== Factory racing support ==
Hudson Motor Car Company was an early proponent of auto racing as an integral component of the automaker's marketing strategy. The company began directly backing their racing teams and "providing the team cars with everything they needed to make their cars faster." Drivers that were part of the Hudson team included Marshall Teague, Herb Thomas, Dick Rathmann, Tim Flock, Fonty Flock, Jack McGrath, Frank "Rebel" Mundy, and Lou Figaro. Together they accounted for 13 wins in 1951, 49 in 1952, and 46 in 1953.

With the lowest center of mass among standard-sized cars at the time, the Hudson was praised for its great handling and roadworthiness so that stock car racers embraced these cars and "christened them with the 'Fabulous' prefix that followed this line through its days of track dominance." This combined with the car's low weight due to the advanced unibody construction that Hudson called a 'step down' design, allowed Hudson drivers to win various stock car racing events from 1951 through 1954. Drivers "proved it could out-handle and out-accelerate much of its supposedly more powerful V-8 competition." The company used the "Fabulous Hudson Hornet, national stock car champion" description in its advertising.

== Marshall Teague ==
Marshall Teague approached the Hudson Motor Car Company by traveling to Michigan and visiting their plant without an appointment. By the end of the visit, Hudson executives assured Teague of corporate support and cars, and the relationship was formalized shortly thereafter. Teague was also instrumental in helping Hudson tune the inline six-cylinder-powered Hudson Hornet to its maximum stock capability. His first time driving the Hornet in the February 1951 Daytona Beach and Road Course resulted in a first-place finish. Teague nicknamed his Hudson Hornet the "Fabulous Hudson Hornet" and had that name painted on the sides of the car. Teague went on to win five of the fifteen NASCAR Grand National races in 1951.

Teague and his crew chief Smokey Yunick won 27 of 34 events in major stock car events, including seven NASCAR events. Teague left NASCAR during the 1952 season in a dispute with NASCAR's owner Bill France Sr.

Teague was awarded the 1951 AAA Stock Car Driver of the Year, and the 1952 and 1954 AAA National Stock Car Champion while driving in the Fabulous Hudson Hornet.

The original Fabulous Hudson Hornet can be found today, fully restored, at the Ypsilanti Automotive Heritage Museum in Ypsilanti, Michigan. This Hornet is also occasionally used in classic car racing.

== Herb Thomas ==
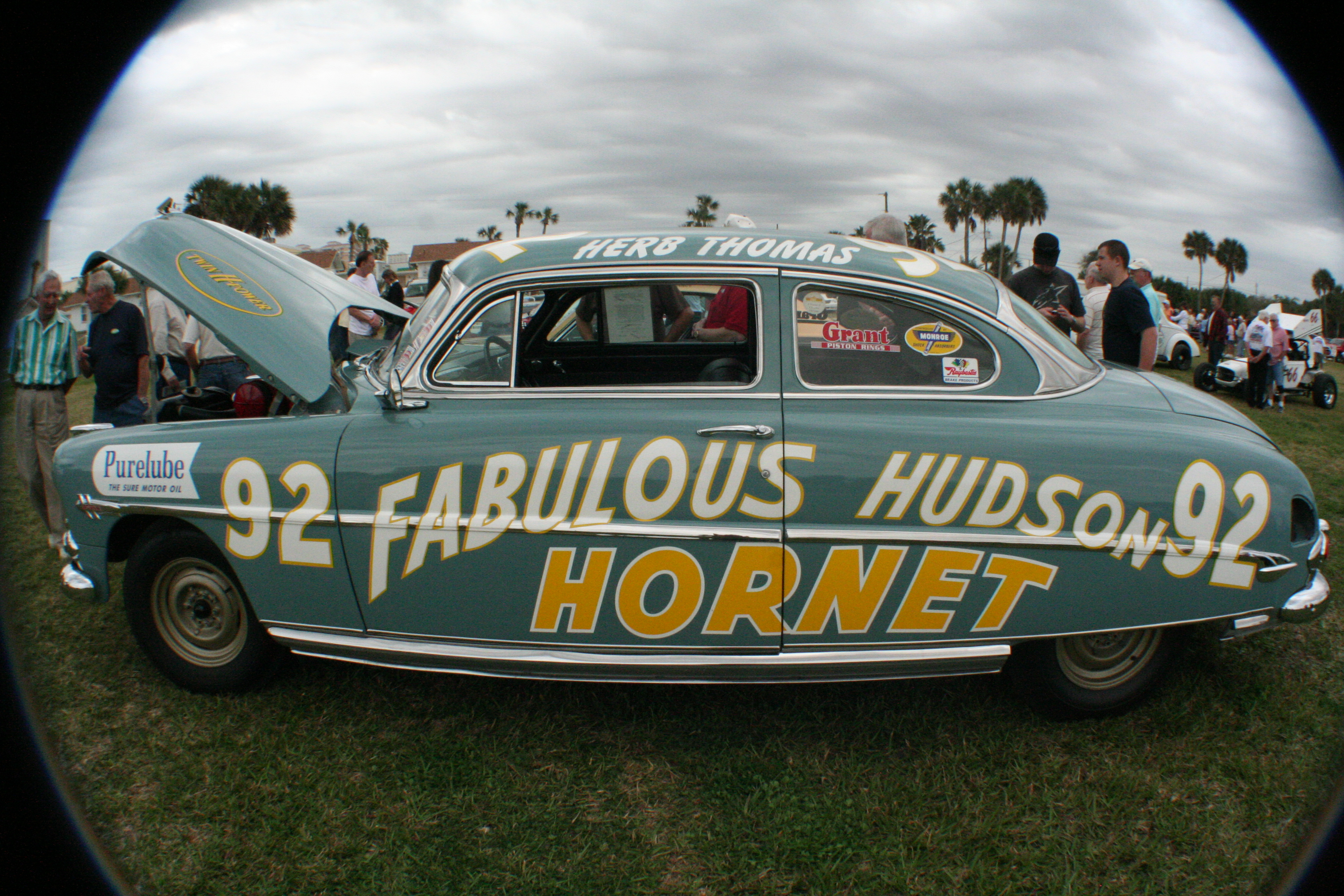
Herb Thomas' #92 Fabulous Hudson Hornet

Herb Thomas began the 1951 NASCAR Grand National season with moderate success in a Plymouth car, plus one win in an Oldsmobile. He switched mid-season to his Fabulous Hudson Hornet and won the 1951 championship.

Thomas dominated the entire 1953 NASCAR Grand National season. He won a series-best 12 races en route to becoming the first two-time series champion.

A 1952 model was purchased by Thomas from a Hudson dealer sometime in late July or August 1952, and he campaigned it during the next season and a half, ultimately capturing fifteen wins, as well as the 1953 championship with it. When Thomas purchased a replacement car to race in the 1954 season, his 1952 model was sold as a used car and subsequently driven in the southern U.S. ending up in eastern Kentucky by the mid-1970s. After being put in storage, changing owners, and verifying the serial numbers that it was the original number 92 raced by Thomas, the car was restored and shown at the 1998 EyesOn Design show.

This car is in the National Historic Vehicle Register. This recognition is limited to cars with "important American historic events, association with important American historic figures, its design or construction value, and its informational value" and shown at 2014 "Cars At The Capital" - the first-ever automotive heritage celebration held on the National Mall.

== Tim Flock ==
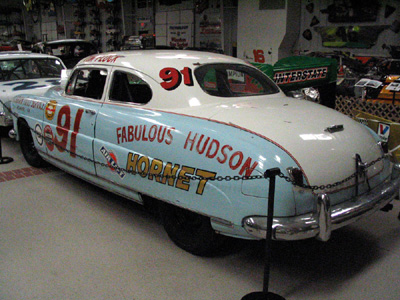
Tim Flock's Fabulous Hudson Hornet

Julius Timothy Flock (May 11, 1924 – March 31, 1998), an early NASCAR two-time series champion, won the 1952 Grand National Champion Cup as driver of one of the three Fabulous Hudson Hornets. His second championship cup, in 1955, was won using a Chrysler automobile. He was forced out of NASCAR after supporting a 1961 unionization attempt, but continued to race under other sanctioning bodies.

== Legacy ==
Despite Hudson's racing success, the marketplace competition and fierce rivalry between Ford and Chevrolet was too much to save the small-scale independent automaker. Hudson merged with Nash-Kelvinator Corporation in 1954 to become American Motors Corporation (AMC). The Hudson name was finally retired in 1957, as AMC transformed into Rambler. The Hornet name was used by AMC for their compact sedan from 1970 to 1977. When automakers began returning to racing venues as a form of advertising and industrial prowess, AMC was competitive in the drag racing scene with their AMX taking the SS/D class record for ten years and successfully fielding the AMC Javelin in the Trans-Am Series winning the manufacturer trophies in 1970 and 1971. The AMC Matador was developed into a winner and favorite on the NASCAR circuits during the early 1970s. The Hornet model name was acquired by Chrysler Corporation with the acquisition of AMC in 1987. The new Dodge Hornet SUV is a high-performance version of the Alfa Romeo Tonale.

=== In the film Cars ===
The 2006 Pixar film Cars tells the story of a hotshot race car named Lightning McQueen (voiced by Owen Wilson) who finds himself stuck in the Route 66 town of Radiator Springs. The town's local judge and doctor is a 1951 Hudson Hornet named Doc Hudson (voiced by Paul Newman), who turns out to be the actual Fabulous Hudson Hornet himself. Doc Hudson closely resembles the real "Fabulous Hudson Hornet." He shares many of the same records as the real car, although their fates differ. His number in the final film is 51, a reference to his model year, despite the fact that no #51 Hornet existed in real life. Doc was at one point planned to share the #6 with his inspiration as seen in storyboards showcased in The Art of Cars book.
