= Ypsilanti Automotive Heritage Museum =

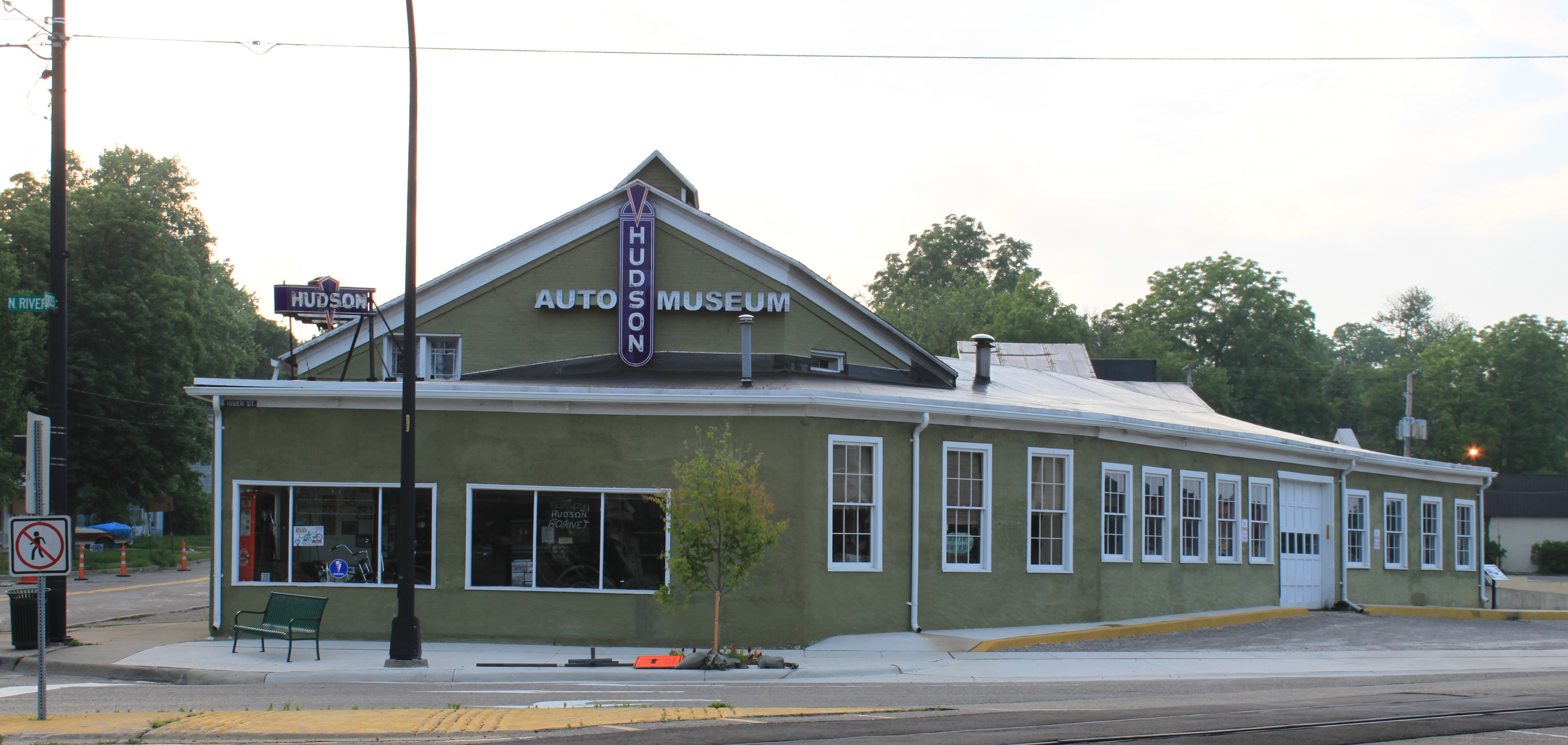
- Main entrance
- Location: 100 East Cross Street; Ypsilanti, Michigan 48198
- Coordinates: 42.24579°N 83.60808°W
- Type: Automotive museum
- President: Ron Bluhm
- Website: www.ypsiautoheritage.org
- 100 E. Cross St
- U.S. Historic district – Contributing property
- Part of: Ypsilanti Historic District (ID78001515)
- Added to NRHP: April 11, 1978

The Ypsilanti Automotive Heritage Museum in Ypsilanti, Michigan is an automotive museum that features cars assembled at the nearby Willow Run Plant and vehicles made by Hudson Motors. The museum is an official site of the MotorCities National Heritage Area, which is "dedicated to preserving, interpreting and promoting the automotive and labor heritage of the State of Michigan."

== Miller Motors ==
In 1916, Joseph H. Thompson opened a Dodge Brothers Motor Company dealership, possibly the first outside Detroit, in the north end of the Thompson Block. Soon after, Thompson moved his dealership across Cross Street, to the site of the museum.

In 1927, Carl Miller opened a Hudson Sales and Service franchise on the site, and in 1955 the dealership was renamed Miller Motors, reflecting expanded product offerings. From 1927 until the Hudson Motor Car Company merged with the Nash-Kelvinator Corporation on May 1, 1954 to form American Motors Corporation (AMC), the dealership sold 1,969 new cars, and has retained and preserved all dealership records since opening. For about 20 years, Miller Motors continued as a used car and parts dealer specializing in Hudsons and Hudson parts. Before Miller Motors was bought and included as a feature of the museum, Miller Motors was "the place to go when [Hudson owners] needed clutch oil or touch-up paint, or wanted to buy or sell a Hudson." Former Museum Curator, Jack Miller, was known as an authority on restoring Hudson cars and the history of Hudson cars.

== Museum ==
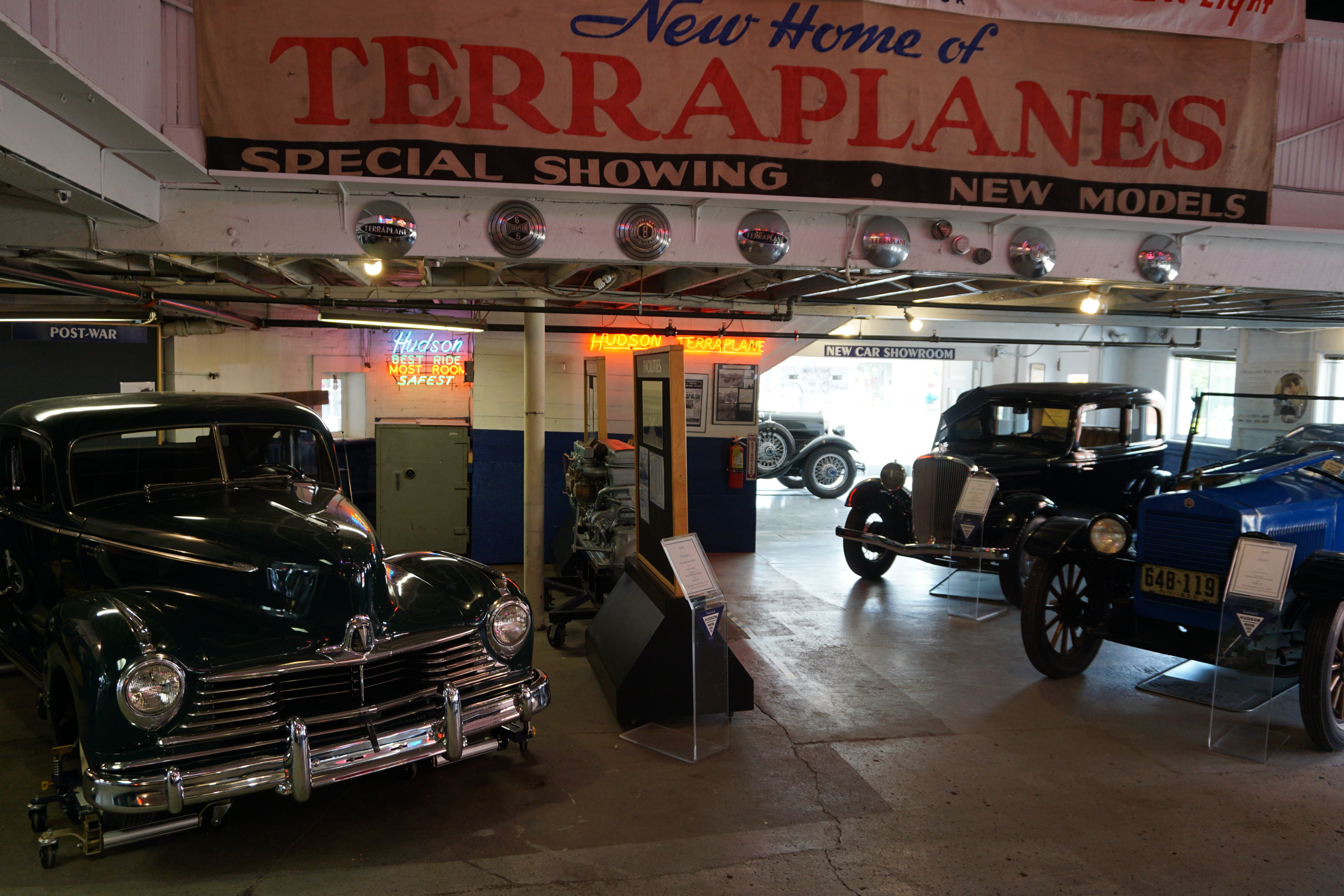
The interior of the Museum in 2015

In the mid-1990s, Jack Miller, Paul "Skip" Ungrodt Jr, and Peter B. Fletcher opened the Ypsilanti Automotive Heritage Museum that included the Miller Motors building.

The museum displays 30 cars. They range from a 1933 Hudson Terraplane K Series Coach to a 1991 Chevrolet Caprice police car that was manufactured at the nearby Willow Run Assembly Plant. The museum considers the "crown jewel" of their collection to be the 1952 Hudson Hornet, known as the Fabulous Hudson Hornet, owned by Herb Thomas when he won his second NASCAR Championship in 1953. The collection includes a Tucker automobile prop from the movie Tucker: The Man and His Dream. This is part of the Preston Tucker display as he was from Ypsilanti and did his engineering work a couple of blocks from the museum. The museum collection also includes "advertising, service, repair, and promotional items that were essential to the automobile business" during the second quarter of the twentieth century.

The museum is open to visitors six days a week (closed Mondays), year-round, and sponsors Cruise Nights during the summer in Depot Town and their annual Orphan Car Show held in nearby Riverside Park.

== Gallery ==
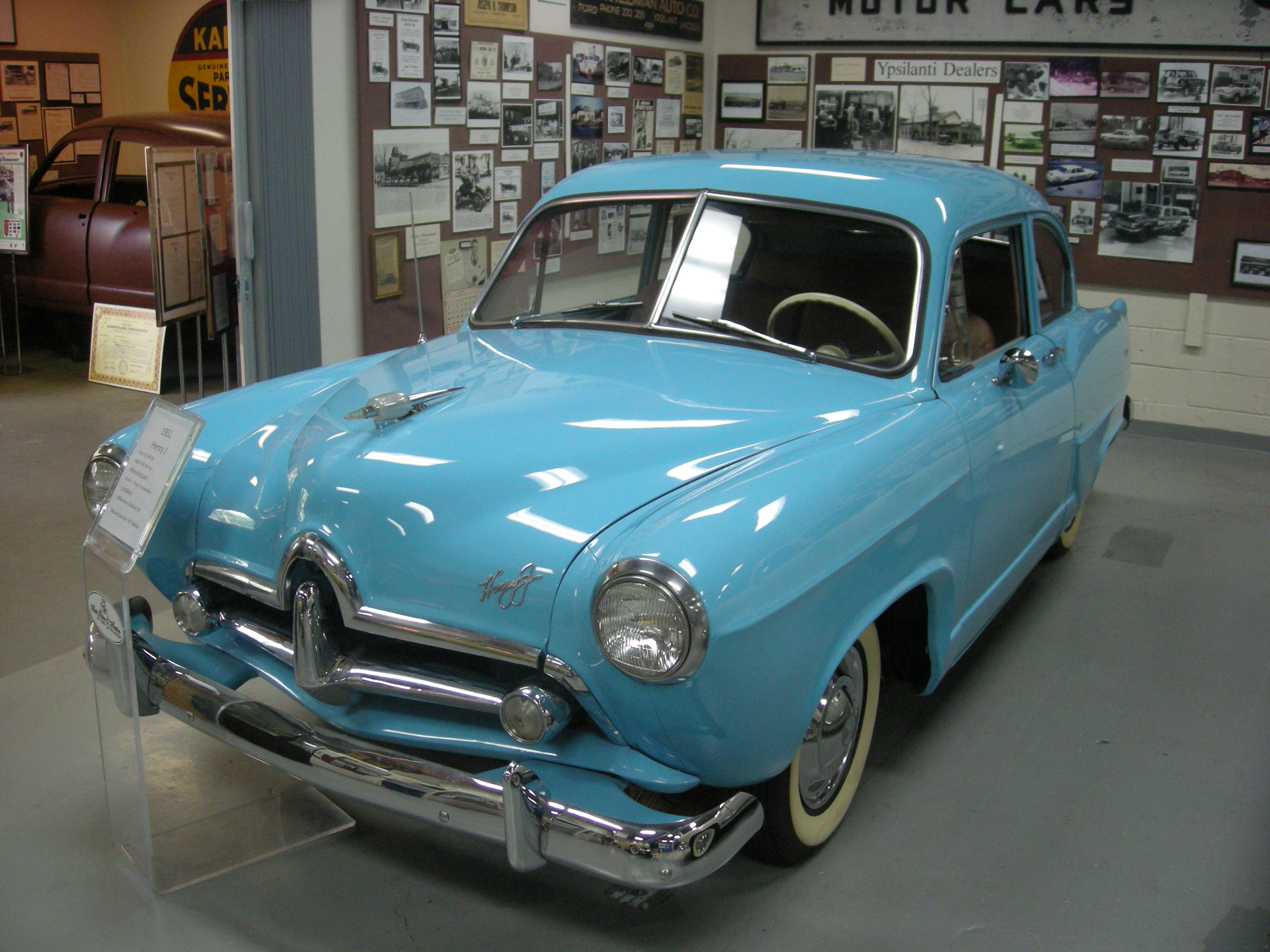
1951 Henry J

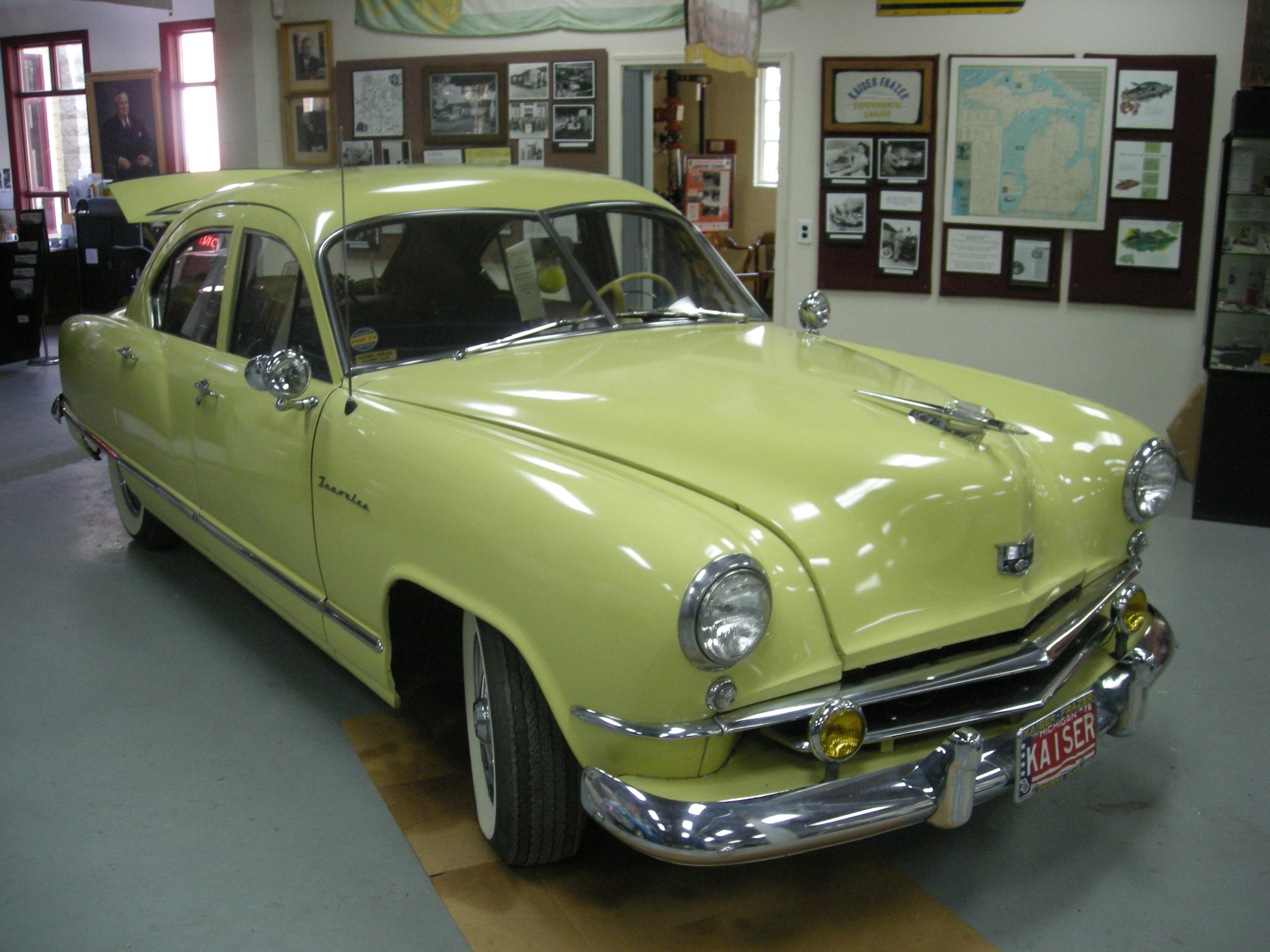
1953 Kaiser Traveler

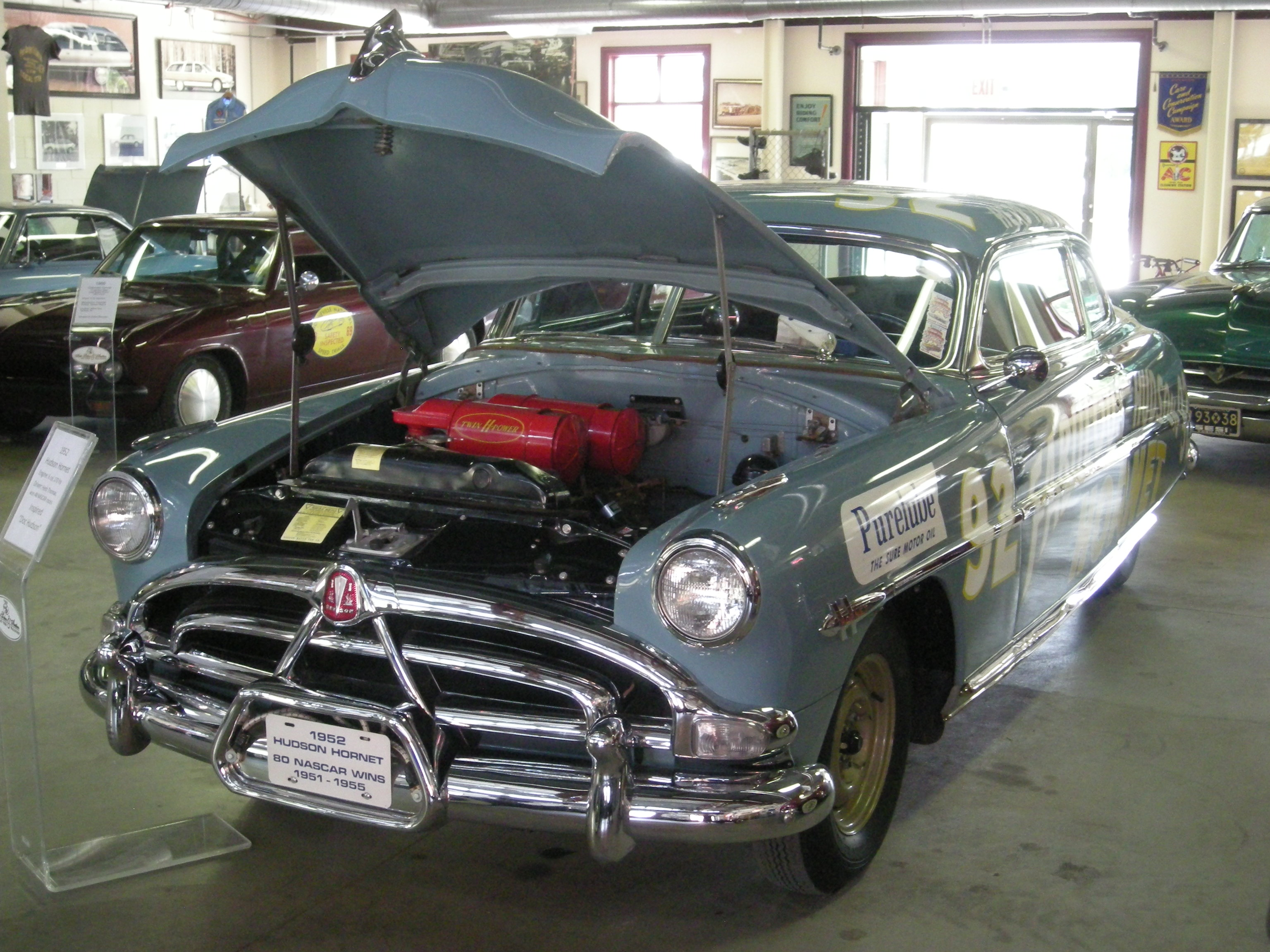
The "Fabulous Hudson Hornet"

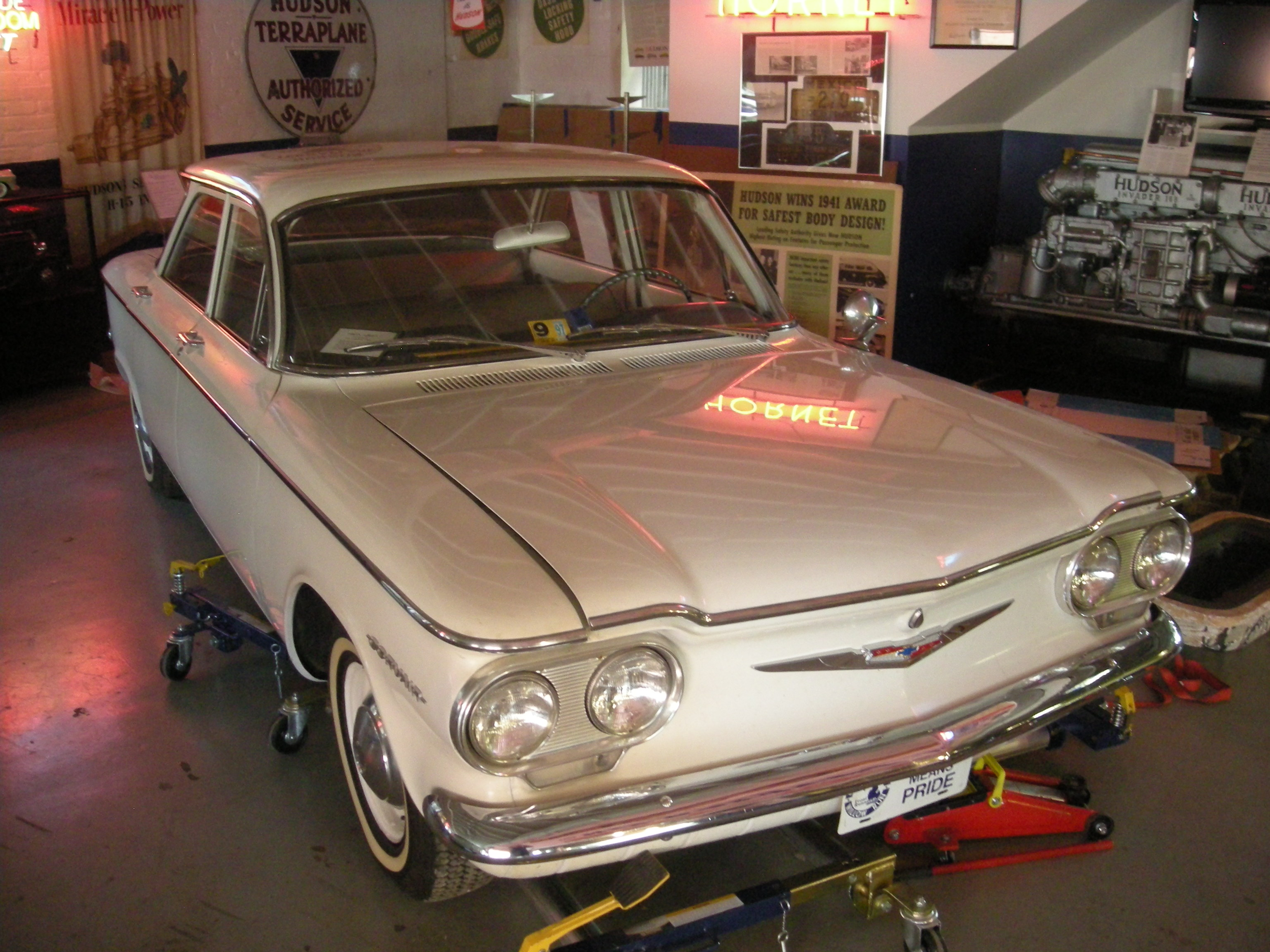
1960 Chevrolet Corvair

== See also ==
- Ypsilanti Historical Society
