= TRAC (disambiguation) =

Trac is a software tool for project management.

Trac or TRAC may also refer to:

- TRAC (programming language)
- Telsiz ve Radyo Amatörleri Cemiyeti, an amateur radio organization in Turkey
- Former Team Racing Auto Circuit
- The Research and Analysis Center, a U.S. Army analysis element
- Transactional Records Access Clearinghouse, at Syracuse University
- Trustworthy Repositories Audit & Certification
- Three Rivers Athletic Conference, Ohio, US
- trac: Music Traditions Wales, for folk music
- Annual Theoretical Roman Archaeology Conference
- Cirrus TRAC Trainer version of the Cirrus SR20 aircraft
