= Sidetrack =

Sidetrack may refer to:

- Sidetrack (Chicago), gay bar in Chicago, Illinois, U.S.
- Sidetrack (rail transport), a railroad track auxiliary to the main track
- Sidetrack (G.I. Joe), a fictional character in the G.I. Joe universe
- Sidetrack (Transformers), a fictional character in the Transformers universe
- Sidetrack Bar & Grill, a bar & restaurant in Ypsilanti, Michigan
- Sidetrack Films, a film production company based out of Brooklyn, New York
- Sidetracks (album), by Steve Earle
- Side Tracks, an album by Bob Dylan from the box set Bob Dylan: The Complete Album Collection Vol. One
- Sidetracks: Explorations of a Romantic Biographer, a 2000 autobiography by British biographer Richard Holmes

== See also ==
- Sidetracked (disambiguation)
