= Sidetrack Bar & Grill =

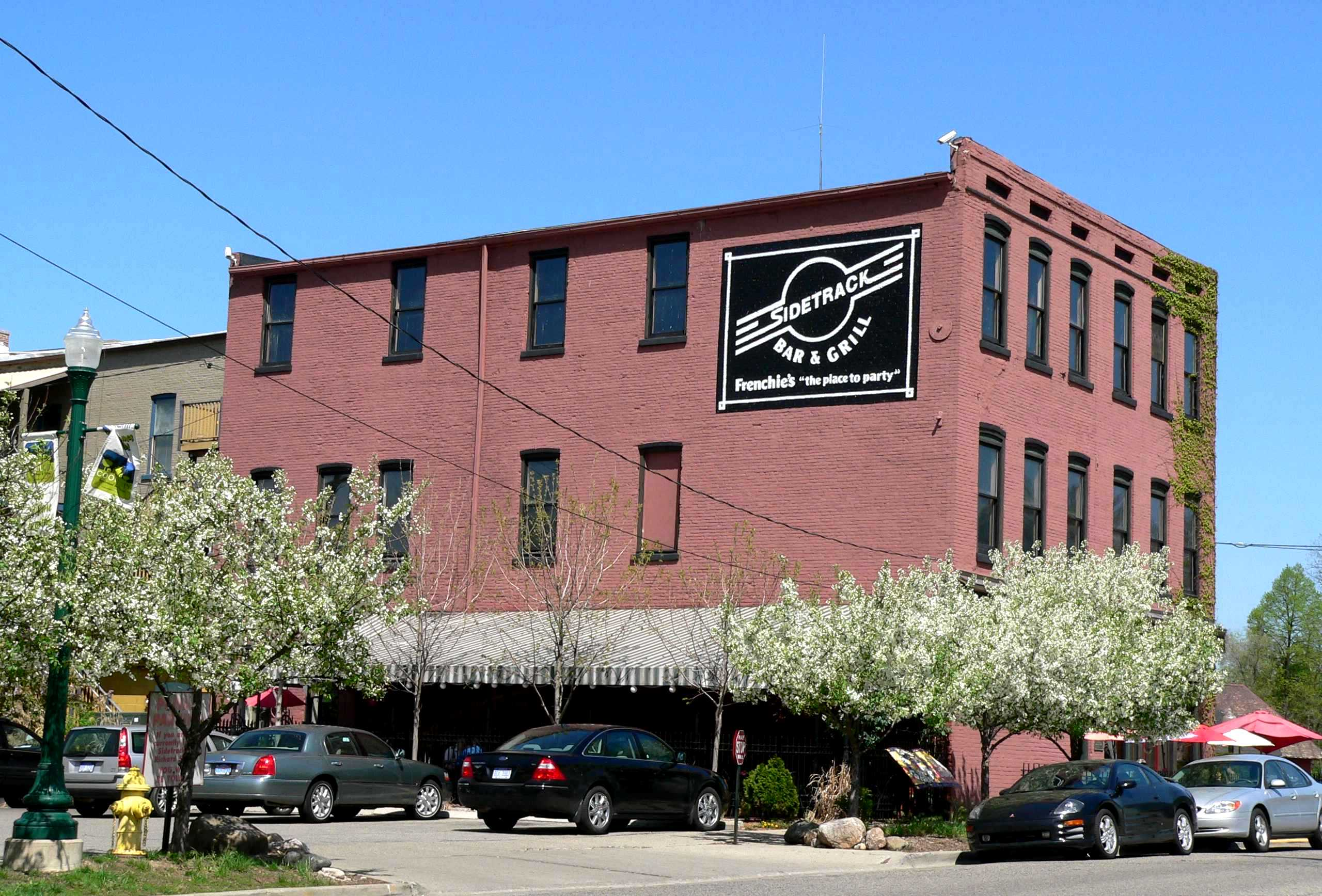
- Sidetrack Bar & Grill in Depot Town
- Interactive map of Sidetrack Bar & Grill

Restaurant information
- Established: 1850
- Owners: Linda and Jessica French
- Food type: American
- Dress code: Casual
- Location: Ypsilanti, Washtenaw, Michigan, 48197, USA
- Coordinates: 42.245826°N 83.608838°W
- Website: www.sidetrackbarandgrill.com

Sidetrack Bar and Grill is a restaurant on the east end of Depot Town in Ypsilanti, Michigan, at 56 East Cross Street. It is just down the road from Eastern Michigan University and is a popular hangout for students and faculty. Linda French, who has owned the restaurant since 1980, named it after “its unique location alongside the main railroad line from Detroit to Chicago.” The location has served as a restaurant, under different names, as far back as 1850. It has a large beer selection as well as liquor and wine and has won awards for its food.

== History ==
=== Names ===
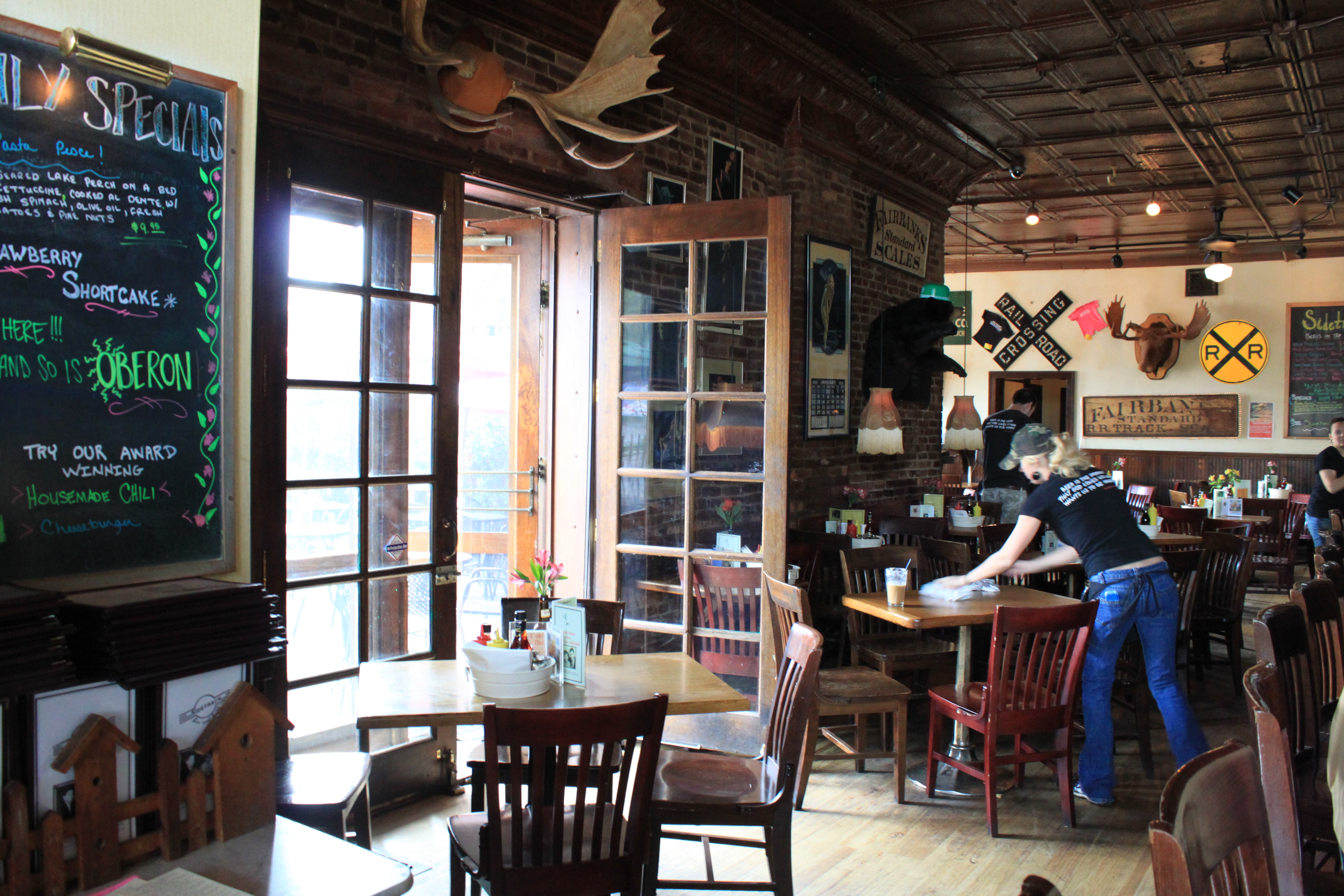
Sidetrack Bar & Grill dining area

Sidetrack Bar and Grill is the current name of the restaurant on the corner of River St. and Cross St. because of its location next to the railroad tracks. Before it was Sidetrack Bar and Grill it was known as Central Bar or “The Central.” The name was from the New York Central Railroad being the owner of the rail line next to Central Bar. New York Central Railroad sold the line to Pennsylvania Railroad which changed the name of the rail line; the Central Bar did not change their name. Christo's Bar was the name previous to Central Bar because the Christo family was the owners and operators. Pictures of them can be found in the Sidetrack's menu today. From back in the nineteenth century until 1949, Max's was the moniker of the bar. Most of the patrons were said to be railroad workers not college students and faculty like they are today.

=== Train Wreck ===
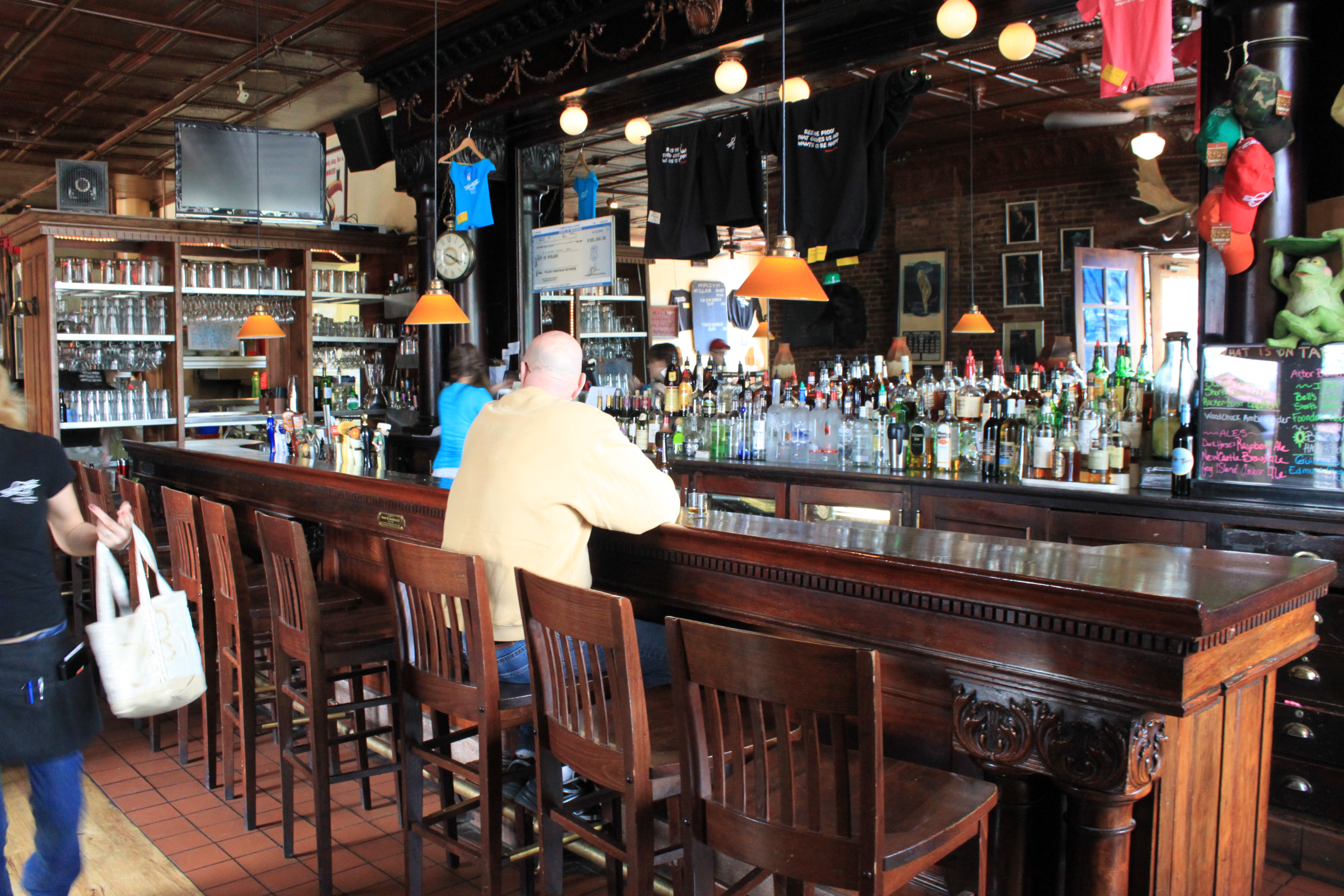
Sidetrack Bar & Grill bar area

Sidetrack's building has an atypical shape due to a train derailment that happened in 1929. On an early January morning, a freight train moving through Depot Town came off its track and crashed into the corner of what is now Sidetrack Bar and Grill. The owner of the building, who lived just above the section that was hit, was uninjured. As a result, she had most of her personal effects scattered out in the street. There were only a few people near the railroad crossing when it derailed including an 18-year-old female who was knocked unconscious and a man who was sitting in his car, but was able to get away unharmed. When the current owners went to build a patio on the spot, they found some of the debris had been piled up underneath, which made it more difficult to dig post holes.

=== Post Prohibition ===
When prohibition was repealed new laws stated that entrances to bar had to be at least five hundred feet from churches. This caused the entrance to the restaurant changed from the east side of the building to the north side in 1931.The church that was located within the five hundred foot limit, burned down before construction began on the back patio.

=== Lawsuit ===
In 2021, the restaurant was named in a lawsuit alleging violations of wage laws.

== Awards ==
GQ magazine named Sidetrack's “Our Famous Burger” one of the "Twenty Hamburgers You Must Eat Before You Die." In the article the magazine said “The closer you come to a college campus, the worse burgers get” and that Sidetrack “is an exception.” Oprah Winfrey had a segment on Gayle King's quest for eating the best burgers in America and according to Sidetrack's web site the bar and grill is mentioned. Sidetrack's menu also claims that they were voted second best restaurant outside Ann Arbor four times.

== The Betty Anne Waters Story ==
Sidetrack Bar and Grill was closed for two days in March 2009 as it was used for location filming for the Hilary Swank film, Conviction. The film is based on the true story of a working mother who puts herself through law school in order to defend her brother after a wrongful murder conviction.
