= Sidetracked =

Sidetracked may refer to:

- Sidetracked (1916 film), a film starring Oliver Hardy
- Sidetracked (2015 film), a Spanish comedy film
- Sidetracked (magazine), an adventure travel and extreme sports magazine
- Sidetracked (novel), a 1995 Kurt Wallander novel by Henning Mankell
- "Sidetracked" (Phineas and Ferb), a 2013 television episode
- "Sidetracked" (Wallander), a 2008 television episode
- "Sidetracked", a song by Maureen Steele from her 1985 album Nature of the Beast
- Sidetracked, a 2010 album by La Roux
- "Sidetracked", a 2010 song by Jme
- Samurai Champloo: Sidetracked, a 2006 video game based on the anime Samurai Champloo

== See also ==
- Sidetrack (disambiguation)
