= The Track (TV series) =

Australian documentary series (2000)

The Track, subtitled The Story of Good Breeding and Bad Behaviour, was an Australian documentary series produced by Penny Chapman, directed by Michael Cordell, Nick Greenaway and Victoria Pitt and broadcast by the ABC in 2000. Written by Keith Aberdeen, it was a six part series about the story of horse racing in Australia. It tell the story with interviews, photos, newsreel footage and re-enactments, with over 80 people being interviewed.

== Episodes ==
1. A Rough Start
2. Pearls and Swine
3. The Poor Man's Way
4. London to a Brick
5. Follow the Money
6. The Last Cup

== Reception ==
Brian Courtis of the Age gave it 3 stars and writes "The Track is rich with paintings, sketches, re-enactments and trackside anecdotes." Robin Oliver of The Sydney Morning Herald called it the show of the week and says the makers "begin this magnificent six-part history of horse racing in Australia by demonstrating what a colourful sport it has always been. Then, as true champions, they ride it hands and heels." Ruth Ritchie, also of The Sydney Morning Herald calls it "Unbelievably good" saying "Stories, stranger than any piece of Stephen King fiction, are told on Australian racecourses by men with unique turns of phrase." The Herald Sun's Tony Johnston writes "this series is a folkloric feast to be enjoyed by all." Writing in The Courier Mail Bart Sinclair finishes "I commend The Track to all for an enjoyable trip down racing's sometimes rocky but always thrilling road."
