= Trac: Music Traditions Wales =

Welsh folk development organisation

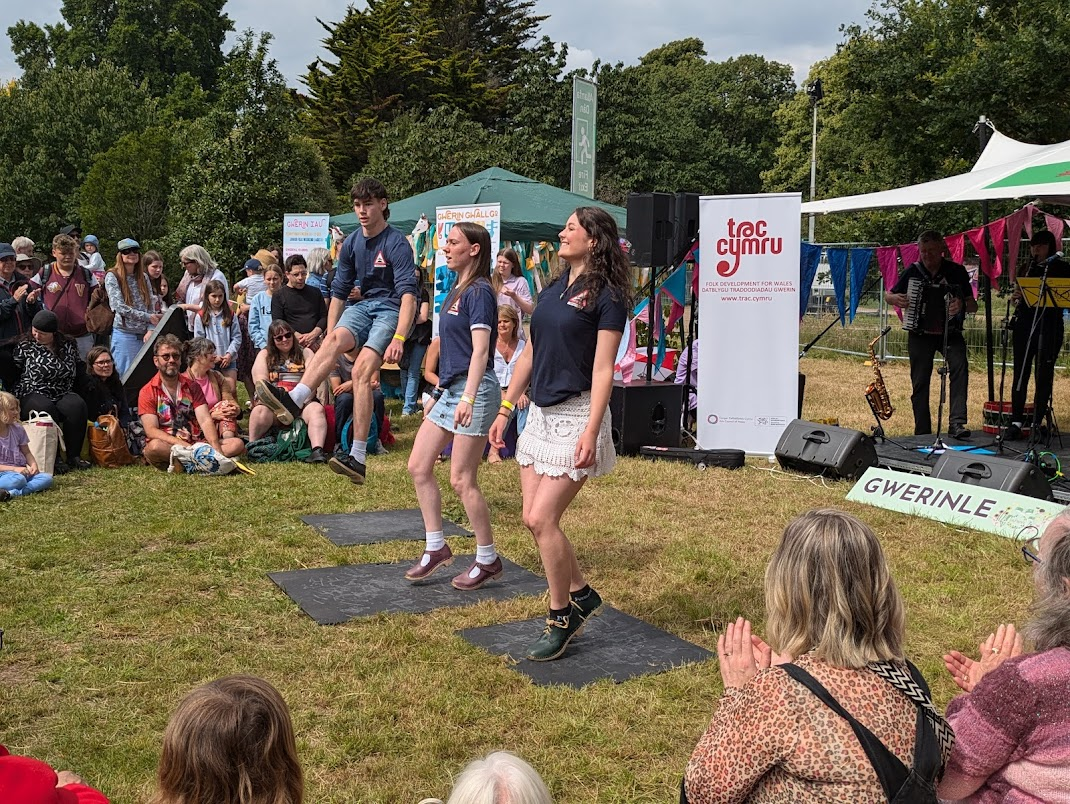
Clog dancing at Tawfyl Welsh festival

Trac Cymru is a Welsh folk development organisation and registered charity which promotes and develops the music and dance traditions of Wales, both within Wales and beyond, and advocates on behalf of the traditional arts with public bodies and other organisations. Activities include a range of annual courses in song, dance and instrumental playing for all ages and abilities. trac also works with the professional sector, providing training for performers, and promoting Welsh traditional music and artists in the UK and abroad, as well as commissioning new artistic work. Trac is supported by the Arts Council of Wales. The organisation was founded by Stephen Rees, Danny KilBride, Phil Freeman, and Ceri Rhys Matthews of Fernhill.

Its board of trustees is chaired by Dr Marlene Davies. Other board members include Terry Duffy, Dr Keith Floyd, Mary-Anne Roberts, Francis Brown, Prof James Blythe, Catherine Bartlett, Sarah Smith and Peter Cornell. Its patrons include Kevin Brennan MP, musician and activist Dafydd Iwan, songwriter and broadcaster Frank Hennessy and broadcaster Huw Stephens.

Trac Cymru has a full-time team of two: Director Danny KilBride and Company Manager Blanche Rowen.

== Constitution ==
Trac Cymru is a registered charity and Company Limited by Guarantee. Its Charity Number is 1085422, and its Company Number is 4106014. Its legal name is Trac: Music Traditions Wales Ltd., or in Welsh Traddodiadau Cerdd Cymru. It is not a membership organisation but is governed by memorandum and articles.
