= Ypsilanti Heritage Festival =

Festival in Ypsilanti, Michigan

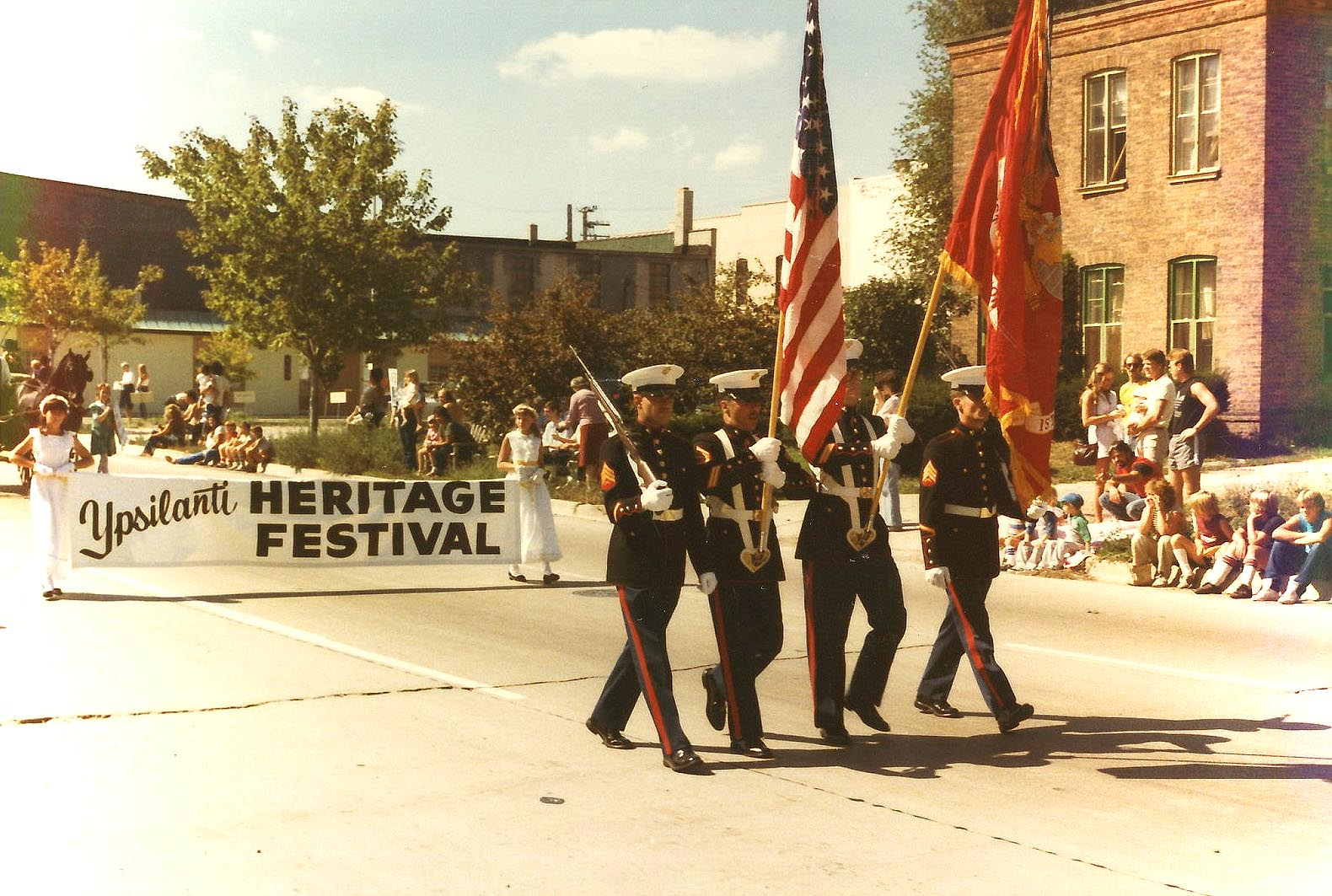
Heritage Festival Parade, 1984

YpsiFest (formerly Ypsilanti Heritage Festival) is a festival in Ypsilanti, Michigan. Held each year on the fourth weekend of August, the festival sprawls across Frog Island Park, Riverside Park, and historic Depot Town. The festival features a variety of activities and entertainment including helicopter rides, acrobats and theater performances by Ring of Steel, evening concerts, gambling and bingo, and a huge kids zone full of children specific activities and rides. Additionally there are featured evens like Illumination@YpsiFest where local business compete for prizes by creating illuminated sculptures for an evening display, and an illumination parade.

== History ==
There was music, there was dancing, there were draft horses prancing, and it all took place Saturday in Depot Town during the Sidewalk Celebration. When sunny skies and lots of heat helped bring out the crowds, they found plenty to do and see.

— Ypsilanti Press, July 16, 1978

The festival was first held on Saturday, July 15, 1978, "from noon 'til nightfall". The sidewalks and streets in Depot Town had just been re-paved, and the Depot Town Association held a "Sidewalk Celebration". The poster advertised a noon sidewalk promenade led by the Honorable George Goodman "Hizzoner" the mayor of Ypsilanti and exciting ribbon cutting ceremonies, dedications and plain or fancy walkin'. The Sidewalk Celebration was such a success that a decision was made to repeat the event, to be known as the "Ypsilanti Yesteryear Heritage Festival".

According to other reports, a motivating factor was the desire to establish a historic district in Ypsilanti, to prevent the city from replacing historic buildings on North Huron Street and in Depot Town with new construction. A group of Ypsilantians applied to the state for funding to publish a guidebook to the city's historic homes, and were told that no money was available for that purpose, but that there was funding available to stage a festival. (Note: Ypsilanti now has the second-largest contiguous historic district in Michigan.) A $15,000 grant from the state helped to fund the 1979 Ypsilanti Yesteryear Heritage Festival.

In 1979, the festival drew 50,000 attendees, continued to grow quickly in subsequent years, and the name was soon shortened to the present name. By the mid-1980s the festival was attracting attention from non-local newspapers — a June 1985 edition of the Toledo Blade referred to it as an "Old time circus, arts and crafts, and historic home tour" — and later that decade the festival was drawing more than 250,000 attendees a year, though attendance subsequently declined, and in recent years the festival has drawn about 100,000 attendees.

2020 saw officials cancel the 43rd on COVID-19 pandemic concerns. That was deferred to 2021.

== Activities ==
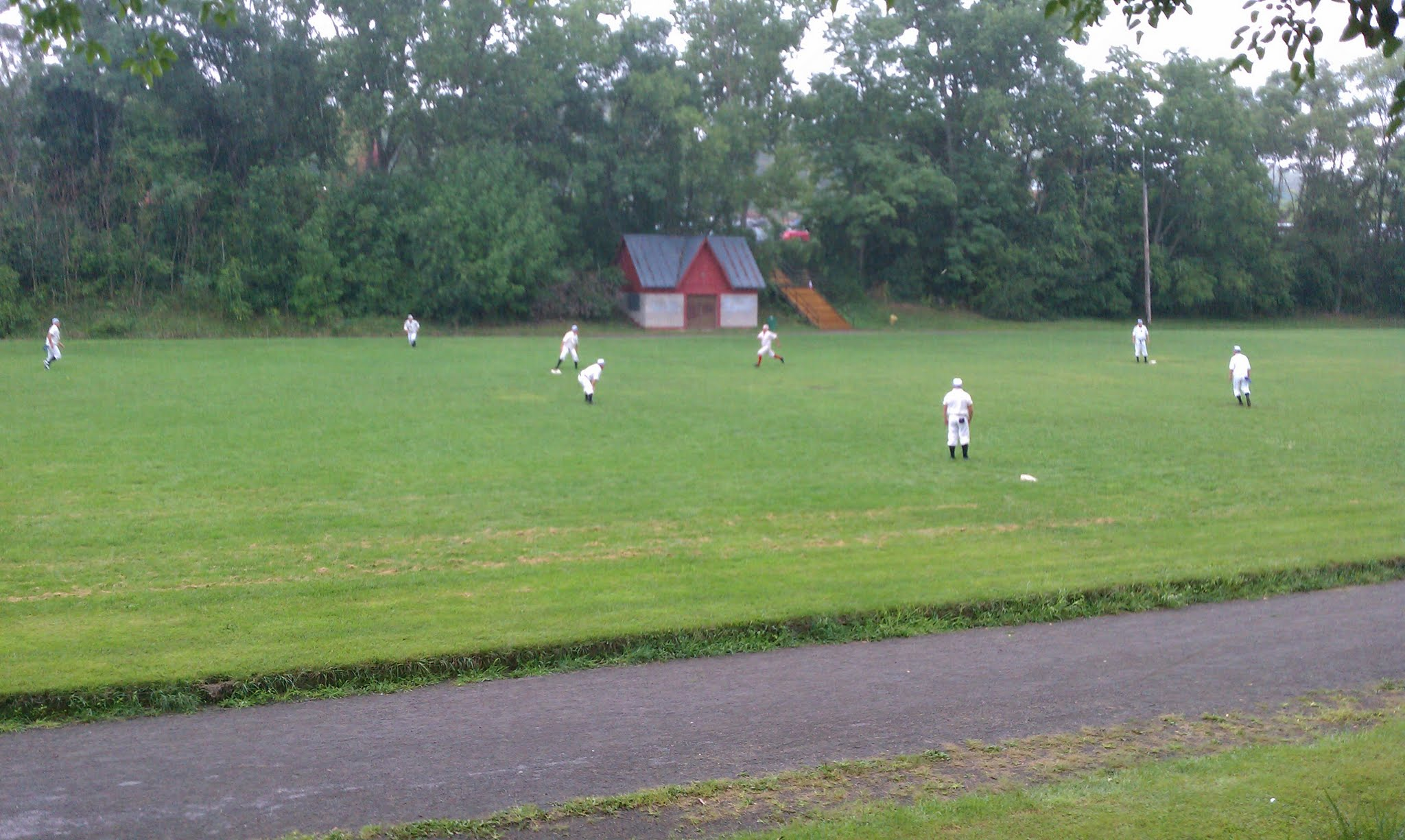
Teams from Greenfield Village play a game of vintage base ball at the Ypsilanti Heritage Festival each year (2011 game pictured).

The Ypsilanti Heritage Festival includes and has included a wide variety of activities and events.

The Ypsilanti Historic Home Tour, held annually during the Ypsilanti Heritage Festival, began, like the festival proper, in 1979. A beer garden and gambling tent anchored the center of the festival from 1979 through 2010. In 2011 the gambling was eliminated for financial reasons, while the beer garden continued with an expanded food and drink selection; however, in January, 2012, new festival director Andrew Clock announced that "the casino will be back, set up right next to the beer tent, where it belongs." A bed race through downtown Ypsilanti was added as an annual event beginning in 2009.

The Ypsilanti Heritage Festival Parade began in 1979, and has been held every year. In 2007, the parade attracted wider attention when parade organizers approved the inclusion of a group protesting a proposed city income tax and subsequently revoked the permission. Festival coordinators explained that their rule was to exclude groups marching to represent controversial or political issues, and that the initial approval was an error.

Because the Ypsilanti Heritage Festival has often been the same weekend as the Woodward Dream Cruise, festival coordinators "decided it would be a blast to have something that was the direct opposite of the Dream Cruise", and the Nightmare Cruise, a spoof of the Woodward Dream Cruise, was born in 2005. The only rules are that "[t]he car has to be legally driveable, and fluid leaks should be at a minimum."

Other events have included a pole vault competition sanctioned by USA Track & Field, live theater, antique cars and fire engines, vintage base ball sponsored by Greenfield Village, "Precious Pets" and "Beautiful Babies" contests, a rubber duck race, a living history encampment, a high wire performance by one of The Flying Wallendas, and a circus.

=== "The Game That Never Was" ===
In 1973, Carolyn King, with support from the Ypsilanti City Council, became one of the first girls in the country to play Little League Baseball. When they found out that she was playing, Little League International officials pulled the Ypsilanti American Little League's charter, and the 1973 All-Star game between the rival Ypsilanti American and National Little Leagues was never played. Thirty-seven years later, the teams were re-assembled similar to an Old-Timers' Day event, in Frog Island Park, as part of the 2010 festival. Billed as "The Game That Never Was", the American League All-Stars (led by Carolyn, who led off and played center field) won, 15–14.
