= Tracks – The Train Set Game =

2019 video game

- Developer: Whoop Games
- Publisher: Excalibur Publishing
- Engine: Unreal Engine
- Platforms: Microsoft Windows; Xbox One; Nintendo Switch
- Release: WW: 11 October 2019
- Genre: Simulation
- Mode: Single-player

Tracks – The Train Set Game, (Note: Formerly written as Tracks: The Train Set Game, and temporarily known as Tracks – The Toy Train Set Game in December 2018) commonly referred to as Tracks, is an indie simulation video game developed by British indie studio Whoop Games and published by Excalibur Publishing for Microsoft Windows. Originally released onto Itch.io in February 2017, the game was added to Steam's Early Access program in September. Tracks – The Train Set Game sees the player build a wooden toy train track. The video game was fully released on 11 October 2019.

== Gameplay ==
Taking inspiration from wooden toy trains, the video game has the player build train tracks out of wood, and then decorate them with miscellaneous objects. The game has both day and night modes.

== Development ==
Currently being developed by Whoop Games, Tracks – The Train Set Game was originally released onto video game distribution website Itch.io on 14 February 2017. During this time, it was available as a free download. In June 2017, it was announced the game would be released onto Steam's Early Access program, and was subsequently available on 28 September 2017 as a full retail version. It is being developed using Epic Games' Unreal Engine The full release of the game, for both Microsoft Windows and Xbox One, was initially announced for 20 September 2019, but delayed to 11 October 2019. While in Early Access, the developers have continued to add additional objects, including barns and animals. The Nintendo Switch version of Tracks was released in November 2020.

== Reception ==
=== While in Early Access ===
Tracks – The Train Set Game was met with praise from critics during development, with many noting the feeling of nostalgia and enjoying the art style.

=== Full Release ===
Internet personalities Matthew Watson and Ryan Magee from the YouTube channel SuperMega praised the game for the amount of content and customization options, as well as for being nostalgic and relaxing.
