= Track (game) =

Strategy board game

Track (also called The Power Game) is a board game published by Smurfit Games in 1975.

== Gameplay ==
Track is an abstract strategy game.

== Reviews ==
- Games #9
- Games & Puzzles #49
