= Vintage base ball =

Sport

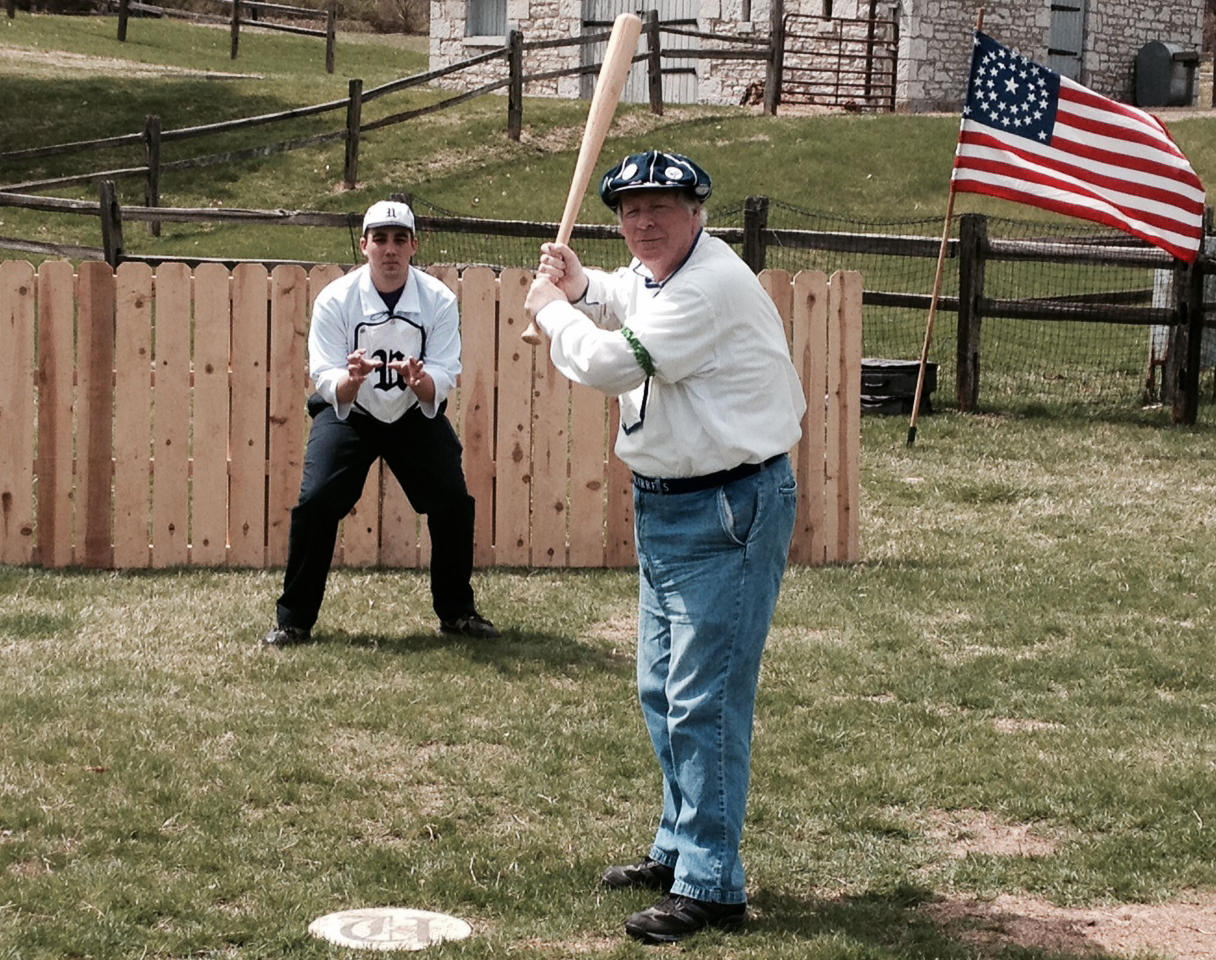

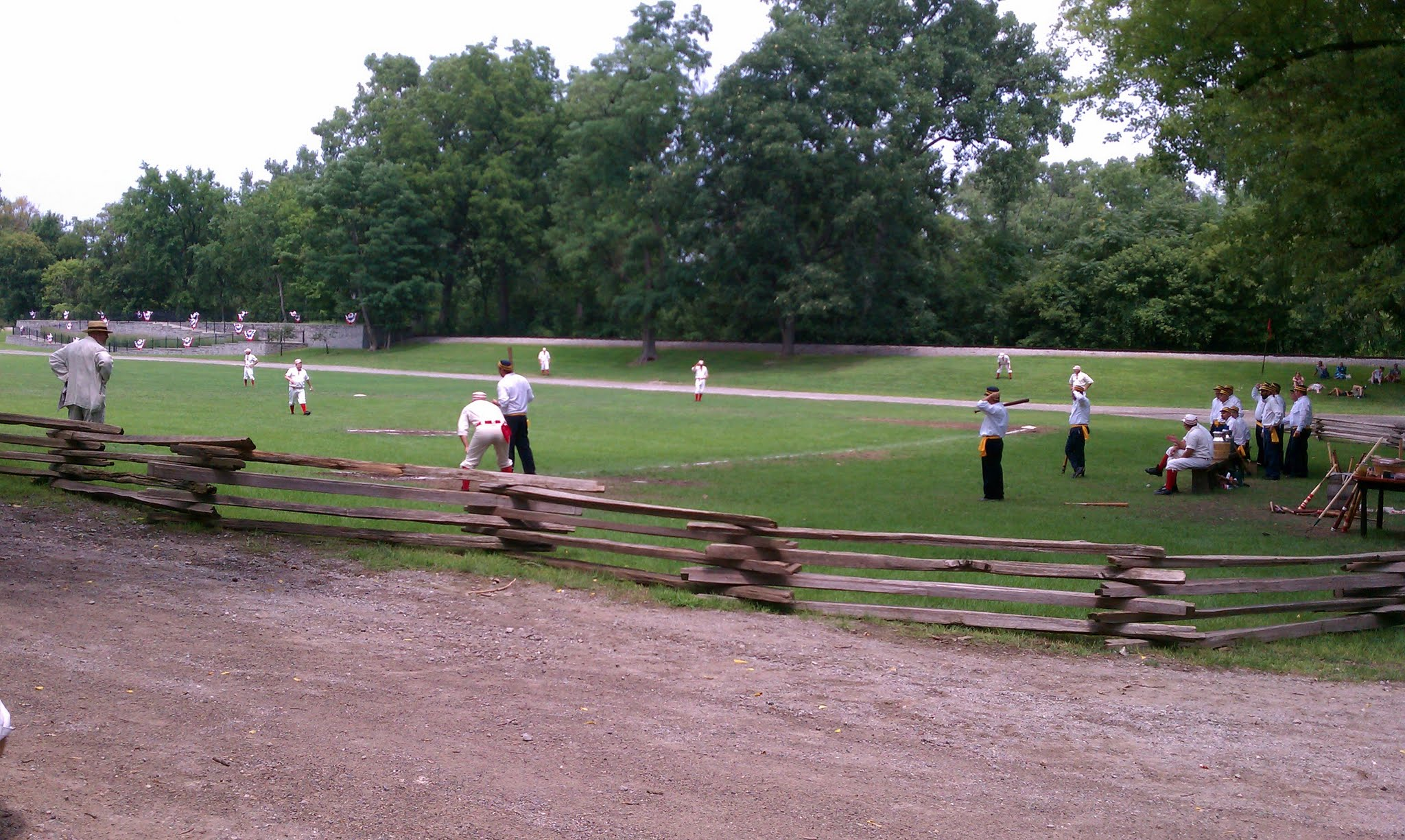
A vintage base ball game underway at Greenfield Village in 2011

Vintage base ball is a version of baseball played as a historical reenactment of an earlier version of the game. Games are typically played using rules from the mid to late 19th century. Often, players dress in uniforms appropriate to the time period, and some teams present themselves as copies of teams that existed in the late 19th century. The game's name is typically written "base ball" rather than "baseball", as that was the spelling used before the 1880s.

== Rules and game play ==
Although rules differ according to which playing year is being used, there are some mostly common rules differences between the modern game and vintage base ball. In rules of years prior to the 1880s, the pitcher's role was to initiate the action by offering an underhanded throw to the batter, or "striker", in much the same way that a basketball referee offers up a jump ball to begin play. Since this type of pitching often caused the batter to hit lazy, foul pop-ups, catchers played their position approximately 20 to 25 feet (6.1 to 7.6 m) behind the batter, and wore no protective equipment. There are typically no fences as base ball is mostly played in fields and green spaces. However, obstacles (e.g. trees, buildings, etc.) often come into play. In many of the rules sets the ball can be played off of one bounce to get a striker out. Catching the ball can be very difficult because no gloves are used. The lack of gloves, underhand pitching and other rules make vintage base ball similar to the sport of British baseball.

== Brief partial summary of differences from modern game ==
1. "Base ball" spelled as two words
2. No gloves
3. Pitching underhanded
4. Ball caught on one bounce is out
5. Can't overrun first base
6. Ball that bounces fair is fair even if it goes foul before the base
7. If pitch too close to call, umpire need not make a call
8. First hittable pitch, "warning to the striker"; three strikes remain before strike out
9. First non-hittable pitch, "warning to the pitcher"; three balls remain before walk

== See also ==
- Doc Adams
- Origins of baseball
- Vintage Base Ball Federation
