= Ypsilanti Community Utilities Authority =

Utility district in Southeast Michigan, US

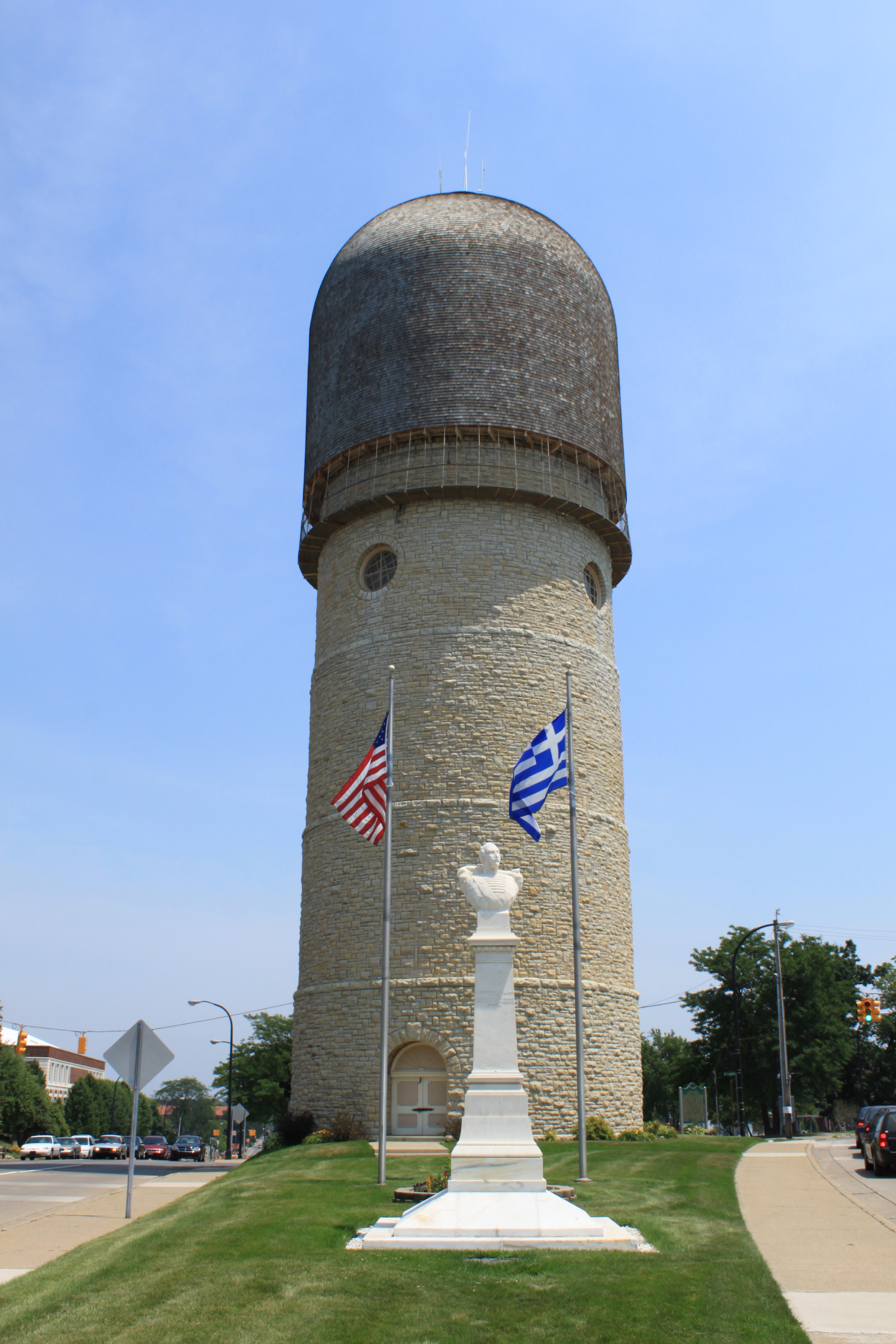
- The Ypsilanti Water Tower, one of two water towers operated by the YCUA

Special district overview
- Formed: 1974
- Headquarters: Ypsilanti Charter Township, Michigan
- Annual budget: $49 m USD (2024)
- Special district executive: Luke Blackburn, Executive Director
- Website: ycua.org

The Ypsilanti Community Utilities Authority (YCUA) is a water and sewer utility serving parts of Washtenaw and Wayne Counties in Michigan, U.S., headquartered in Ypsilanti Township. Its facilities include a regional sewage treatment plant near Willow Run Airport and the historic Ypsilanti Water Tower.

The YCUA was formed in 1974 to provide water and sewer services to the City of Ypsilanti and Ypsilanti Township. As of 2024, the YCUA serves approximately 328,000 people in 12 municipalities across eastern Washtenaw and western Wayne counties.

== Services and facilities ==
The YCUA provides drinking water service to a population of approximately 151,000, and sewer service to approximately 328,000 people.

The YCUA owns, operates, and maintains the water distribution system in the City of Ypsilanti and Ypsilanti Township. Drinking water distributed by the YCUA is sourced from the Great Lakes Water Authority, which draws raw water from the Detroit River and Lake St. Clair. The YCUA also supplies drinking water to other municipalities, including Pittsfield and York townships, on a wholesale basis.

The water distribution system includes two water towers, one of which is the 1890-built Ypsilanti Water Tower. The Ypsilanti Water Tower is designated as an American Water Landmark, and is listed on the National Register of Historic Places. A second water tower is located on the grounds of Ypsilanti Community High School, and has featured the school's Grizzlies mascot since 2024.

In addition to its water supply operations, the YCUA is also responsible for sewage treatment. The YCUA's sewage treatment plant, located west of Willow Run Airport, treats sewage from 12 municipalities to the north and west of the plant, including 7 in eastern Washtenaw County and 5 in western Wayne County.

== History ==
The City of Ypsilanti was incorporated in 1858, and its landmark water tower was completed in 1890. Drinking water was sourced from deep wells, and purified at a water treatment plant on Catherine Street adjacent to the Huron River. Ypsilanti Township, a separate municipality that surrounds the city of Ypsilanti on three sides, experienced significant population growth in the mid-20th century, and required additional water treatment capacity by the 1970s. The township also drew water from wells, connected to a treatment plant near the Ford Lake Dam, The township's water supply was supplemented by a connection to the Detroit Water and Sewerage Department (DWSD) distribution system in 1972.

In the early 1960s, the city built a new sewage treatment plant on at the northern end of Ford Lake, an impoundment of the Huron River downstream of the city. The plant was unable to fully treat the contamination in Ypsilanti's sewage from industrial users, and water quality in Ford Lake began to deteriorate. Ypsilanti Township operated a sewage treatment plant that discharged into Belleville Lake, upstream of the city of Belleville on the Huron River. By early 1974, both sewage treatment plants were at capacity.

The YCUA was formed in late 1974 by the merger of the city and township's water utility departments. The formation of the YCUA occurred during a time of political conflict regarding sewage in southeast Michigan. A regional sewage treatment system for the Huron River watershed had recently been proposed, and multiple Washtenaw County municipalities were opposed to it. The YCUA proposed a new sewage treatment plant to serve both the city of Ypsilanti and Ypsilanti Township, and sought federal funding to construct it. The new treatment plant would discharge treated sewage downstream of Belleville Lake, resolving the water quality issues in both Ford Lake and Belleville Lake.

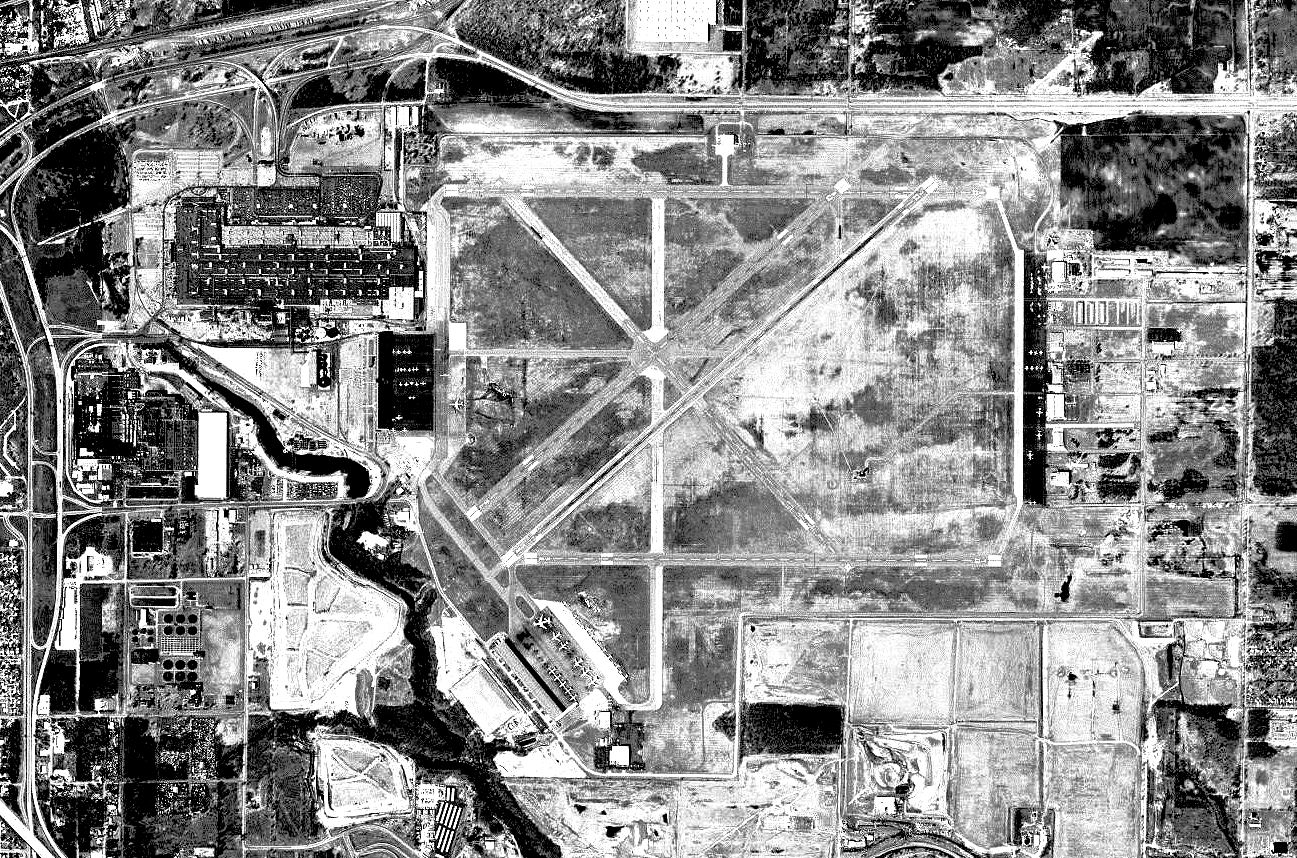
1999 orthophoto of Willow Run Airport and vicinity. The YCUA sewage treatment plant is visible as 12 circles in the lower left of the image.

In its first years, the YCUA experienced significant financial difficulties. The 1973–1975 recession affected industrial and residential development in the authority's service area, meaning that the new sewage treatment plant would be well under capacity. The new plant was completed in 1982, and Ypsilanti Township leaders offered to connect Canton to the plant to increase utilization.

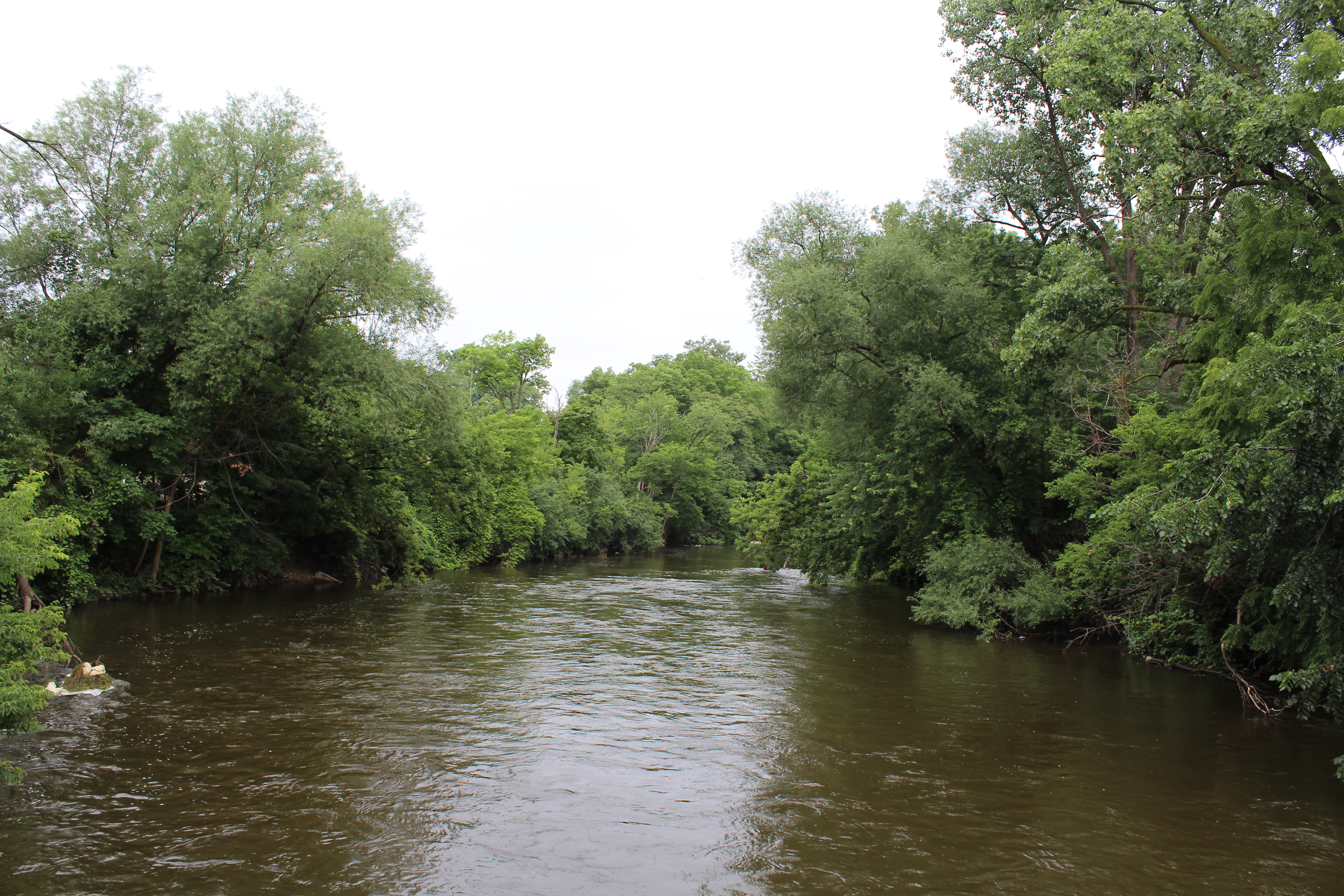
Waterworks Park, the former site of the Catherine Street water treatment plant

Both of the water treatment plants operated by the YCUA were taken out of service in the 1990s. Drinking water supplied by the YCUA is sourced from the Great Lakes Water Authority, formerly the Detroit Water and Sewerage Department. The YCUA's service area has expanded since its inception, with the addition of sewer service to multiple western Wayne County municipalities. The sewage treatment plant was expanded and upgraded in the early 2000s, including the installation of new ultraviolet disinfection systems.

A new connection to the YCUA sewage treatment plant is the subject of an ongoing political controversy in Salem Township in northeastern Washtenaw County. Salem Township officials began planning for a residential and commercial development near the interchange of M-14 and Gotfredson Road in the early 2000s, which would require water and sewer service. Salem Township contracted with the YCUA in 2017 to purchase sewage treatment capacity, but neighboring Superior Township opposed the construction of the necessary pipeline. Salem Township responded by proposing to construct its own sewage treatment plant, which was met with significant public opposition. As of 2025, Salem Township is proposing to instead construct a pipeline through Canton and Van Buren Township to reach the YCUA sewage treatment plant.

In 2025, a controversy arose over a data center project in Ypsilanti Township, which involved the YCUA. The project was proposed by the University of Michigan and Los Alamos National Laboratory, and was strongly opposed by the Ypsilanti Township government. The YCUA imposed a 12-month moratorium on supplying water to data center projects in April 2026, which affects the Ypsilanti Township site and a Thor Equities data center project in Augusta Township.

== See also ==
- Great Lakes Water Authority
