= Detroit River =

River connecting Lake Huron with Lake Erie

Detroit River Rivière Détroit
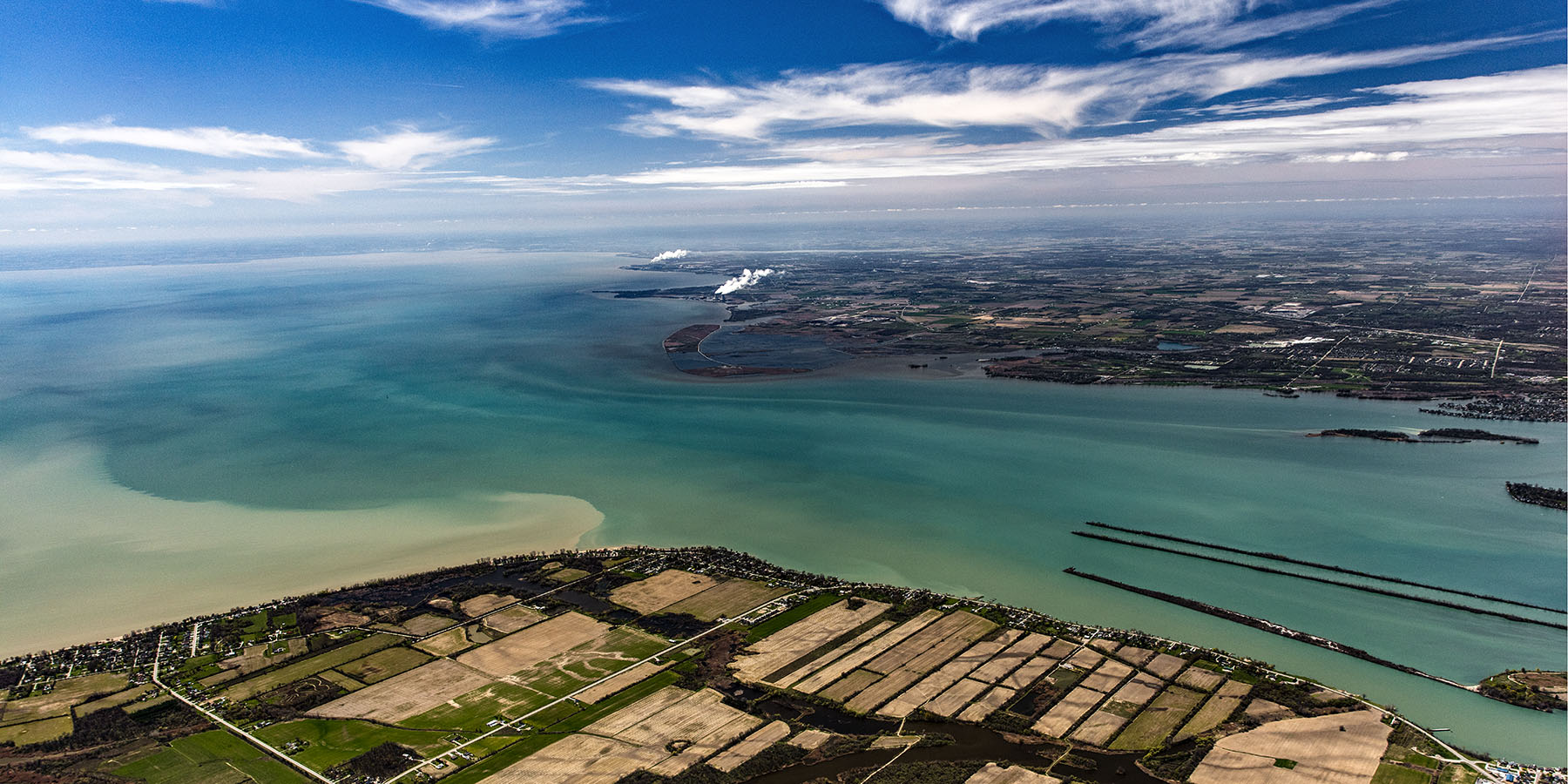
- Southern end as it enters Lake Erie with Canada in the foreground and the U.S. in the background

- Location within the state of Michigan Location within the United States

Location
- Country: United States, Canada
- State: Michigan
- Province: Ontario
- Cities: US: Grosse Pointe Park, Detroit, River Rouge, Ecorse, Wyandotte, Riverview, Trenton, Gibraltar; Canada: Tecumseh, Windsor, La Salle, Amherstburg

Physical characteristics
- Source: Lake St. Clair
  - coordinates: 42°21′07″N 82°55′03″W
  - elevation: 574 ft (175 m)
- Mouth: Lake Erie
  - coordinates: 42°03′06″N 83°09′05″W
  - elevation: 571 ft (174 m)
- Length: 28 mi (45 km)
- Basin size: 700 sq mi (1,800 km^{2})

Basin features
- Tributaries
  - left: Little River, River Canard
  - right: River Rouge, Ecorse River
- Islands: 31 (list of islands)

The Detroit River is an international river in North America. The river, which forms part of the international border between the U.S. state of Michigan and the Canadian province of Ontario, flows west and south for 24 nautical miles (28 mi; 44 km) from Lake St. Clair to Lake Erie as a strait in the Great Lakes system. The river divides the metropolitan areas of Detroit, Michigan, and Windsor, Ontario—an area collectively referred to as Detroit–Windsor. The Ambassador Bridge, the Detroit–Windsor Tunnel, the Gordie Howe International Bridge, and the Michigan Central Railway Tunnel connect the cities.

The river's English name comes from the French Rivière du Détroit (translated as "River of the Strait"). The Detroit River has served an important role in the history of Detroit and Windsor, and is one of the world's busiest waterways. It is an important transportation route connecting Lake Michigan, Lake Huron, and Lake Superior to Lake Erie and eventually to Lake Ontario, the St. Lawrence Seaway and the Erie Canal. When Detroit underwent rapid industrialization at the turn of the 20th century, the Detroit River became polluted and toxic. Since the late 20th century, however, a vast restoration effort has been undertaken because of the river's ecological importance.

In the early 21st century, the river today has a wide variety of economic and recreational uses. There are numerous islands in the Detroit River, and much of the lower portion of the river is part of the Detroit River International Wildlife Refuge. The portion of the river in the city of Detroit has been organized into the Detroit International Riverfront and the William G. Milliken State Park and Harbor. The Detroit River is designated both an American Heritage River and a Canadian Heritage River—the only river to have this dual designation.

== Geography ==
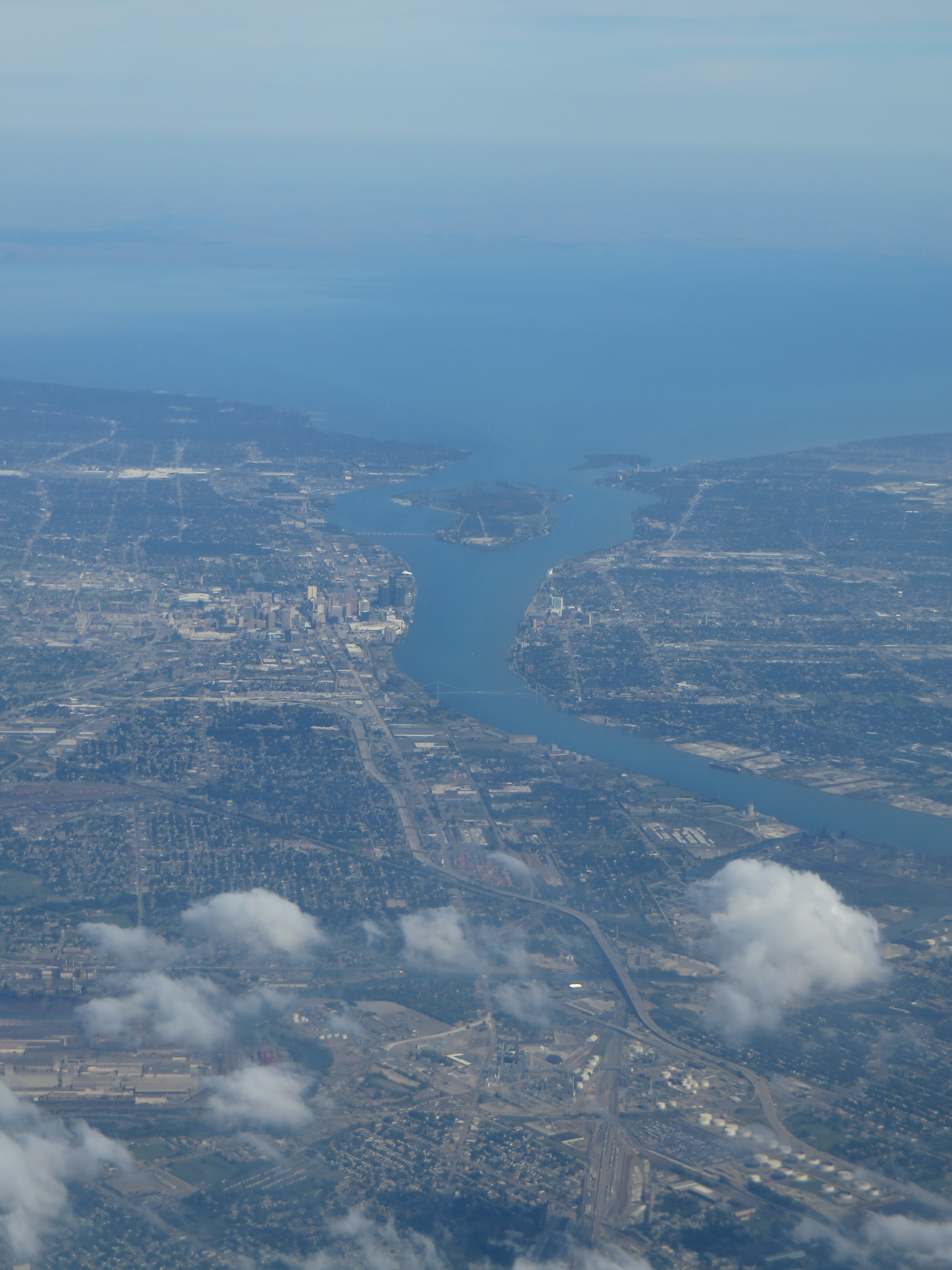
Aerial view of the Detroit River looking east-northeast

The Detroit River flows for 28 mi (45 km) from Lake St. Clair to Lake Erie. By definition, this classifies it as both a river and a strait — a strait being a narrow passageway connecting two large bodies of water, which is how the river earned its name from early French settlers. However, today, the Detroit River is rarely referred to as a strait, because bodies of water referred to as straits are typically much wider relative to their length. The river forms the southern portion of the waterway connecting Lake Huron to the north and Lake Erie to the south, with other portions including the St. Clair River and Lake St. Clair.

The Detroit River is only 0.5–2.5 miles (0.8–4.0 km) wide. It begins with an east-to-west flow from Lake St. Clair, but curves and runs north to south. The deepest portion of the Detroit River is 53 feet (16.2 m) in its northern portion. At its source, the river is at an elevation of 574 feet (175 m) above sea level. The river is relatively level, dropping only 3 feet (0.9 m) before entering Lake Erie at 571 feet (174 m). As the river contains no dams and no locks, it is easily navigable by even the smallest of vessels. The watershed basin for the Detroit River is approximately 700 square miles (1,800 km^{2}).

Since the river is fairly short, it has few tributaries, the largest being the River Rouge in Michigan; this is four times longer than the Detroit River and contains most of the watershed. The only other major American tributary to the Detroit River is the much smaller Ecorse River. Tributaries on the Canadian side include Little River, Turkey Creek, and the River Canard. The discharge for the Detroit River is relatively high for a river of its size. The river's discharge averaged over the year is 190,000 cubic feet per second (5,300 m^{3}/s), and the river's flow is relatively constant.

The Detroit River forms a major element of the international border between the United States and Canada. The river on the American side is all under the jurisdiction of Wayne County, Michigan, and the Canadian side is under the administration of Essex County, Ontario. The largest city along the Detroit River is Detroit, and most of the population along the river lives in Michigan. The Detroit River has three automobile traffic crossings connecting the United States and Canada: the Ambassador Bridge, the Gordie Howe International Bridge, and the Detroit–Windsor Tunnel. These are strongly protected by the U.S. Customs and Border Protection and the Canada Border Services Agency.

The upper portion of the river is one of the two places where a Canadian city lies directly south of an American city. In this case, the city of Detroit is directly north of the city of Windsor, Ontario. The only other location where this occurs is Fort Erie, Ontario, which lies south of several cities in Niagara County, New York. The cities and communities southwest of Detroit along the American side of the river are popularly referred to as the Downriver area, because those areas are said to be "down the river" from Detroit. Several of these communities do not border the Detroit River but the term "Downriver" refers broadly to the cluster of 18 suburban communities that lie to the southwest of the city of Detroit and to the west of the Detroit River.

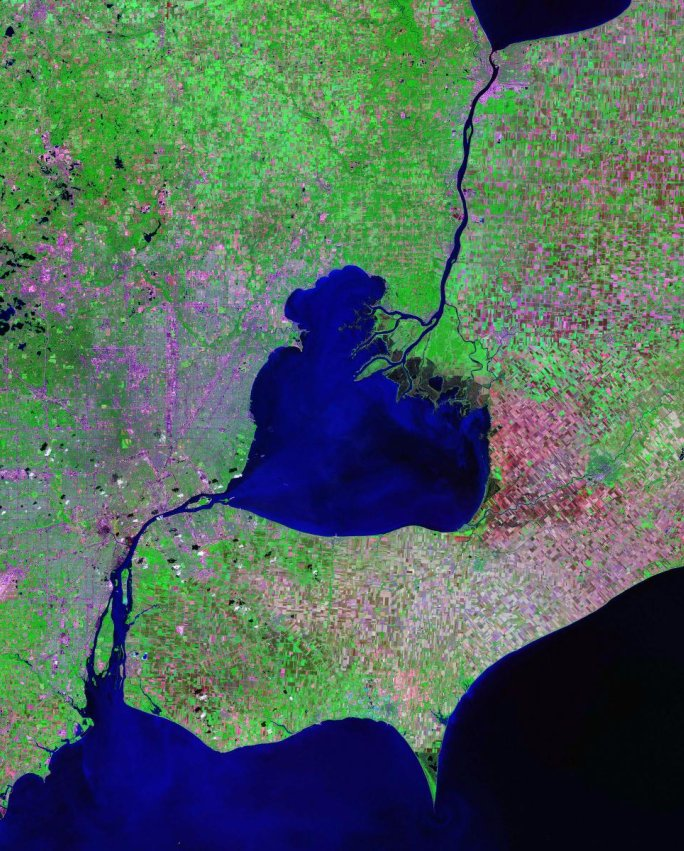
Satellite photo showing Lake Saint Clair (center) with the Detroit River connecting it to Lake Erie (to the south) and the St. Clair River connecting it to Lake Huron (to the north).

=== Islands ===
The Detroit River contains 31 charted islands. The majority of the islands are located on the American side of the river. Many of the islands are small and uninhabited, and none are divided by the international border, as the two countries do not share a land border along the river. Grosse Ile is the largest and most populated of all islands, and Fighting Island is the largest Canadian island. Most islands are located in the southern portion of the river.

== History ==
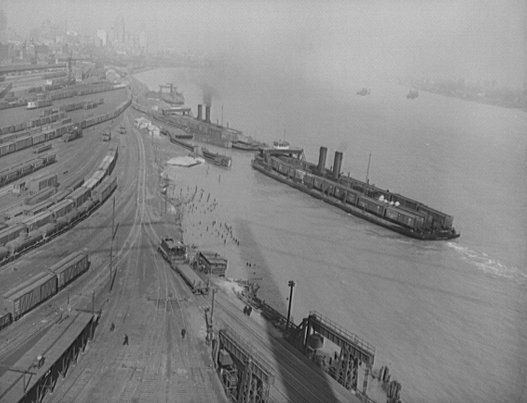
Aerial view of a classification yard and two train ferries, 1943. Photograph by Arthur Siegel.

Europeans first recorded navigating the Detroit River in the 17th century. The Iroquois traded furs with the Dutch colonists at New Amsterdam by traveling through the Detroit River. The French later claimed the area for New France. The famed sailing ship Le Griffon reached the mouth of the Detroit River in mid-August 1679 on its maiden voyage through the Great Lakes. Later, when the French began settling in the area, they navigated the river using canoes made of birch or elm bark. Handcrafted vessels were a common mode of travel across the river, and pirogues and bateaux were also used.

As the North American fur trade intensified, European settlers expanded their trade westward into uncharted territories. French explorer Antoine Laumet de La Mothe, sieur de Cadillac sailed up the Detroit River on July 23, 1701. The next day, he established Fort Pontchartrain du Détroit, which developed as Detroit. The French named the river as Rivière Détroit. Détroit is French for "strait". The river was known literally as the "River of the Strait".

When Great Britain defeated the French in the Seven Years' War (known as the French and Indian War on the American front), it took over control of the Detroit River, as well as other French territory east of the Mississippi River. The newly formed United States claimed this territory during the American Revolution, but the British did not transfer it until 1796.

During the War of 1812, the Detroit River served as a major barrier between the American Michigan Territory and British Upper Canada, especially during the Battle of Fort Detroit in August 1812. Detroit briefly fell to the British. After the completion of the Erie Canal in 1817, which opened up easier travel to Lake Erie from the East Coast of the United States, connecting the Great Lakes to the Hudson River and the port of New York City, the Detroit River became a route for many migrating settlers traveling to northern Michigan. Detroit rapidly attracted a share of new residents. Following the Patriot War, in which British regulars and Michigan militia nearly came to armed conflict on the ice-covered Detroit River, the United States built Fort Wayne at Detroit to counter Britain's riverside Fort Malden at Amherstburg across the river.

The Detroit River served as a final stop on the Underground Railroad and was the most active entry point along the United States–Canada border for fugitive slaves.

Escaping slaves often chose to cross through the Detroit River rather than flee to Mexico because of the river's location near free states made it less risky than traveling through slaveholding states that border Mexico. The strong Underground Railroad networks in the Canadian border region also assisted Blacks hoping to flee from the U.S. once the Fugitive Slave Act was strengthened in 1850. Canada also granted legal immigration status to Blacks, while Mexico did not for many years.

Individuals and organizations assisted escaping slaves hoping to cross the Detroit River from the United States into Canada. The Second Baptist Church of Detroit and First Baptist Church of Amherstburg coordinated ferrying thousands of Blacks across the Detroit River into Canada, and Detroit's Colored Vigilant Committee assisted over 1,500 fugitives in crossing into Canada. Famous abolitionists and Underground Railroad conductors including George DeBaptiste and William Lambert worked individually and with these organizations to assist fleeing slaves and condemn slavery.

There was considerable transnational fluidity between the Canadian and American sides of the river until the middle of the 19th century. The 1833 Blackburn Riots in Detroit, which erupted after slave hunters detained couple Lucie and Thornton Blackburn, marked the end of hundreds of years of a nearly porous border between Canada and the United States on the Detroit River. Detroit's African American population protested and helped the Blackburns escape across the Detroit River to Upper Canada, where the British colonial government in Canada declared former slaves could not be extradited to be returned to their owners. With their freedom in Canada secured, crossing the Detroit River out of the United States became an imperative for escaping slaves.

During the American Civil War (1861–1865), the Union feared the seceded Confederate States of America (CSA) would plan a northerly attack from Canada, which was controlled by the British Empire and remained neutral in the war. The Union feared the CSA would cross the Detroit River to launch this attack. For that reason, Union forces regularly patrolled the Detroit River and the fortification at Fort Wayne improved, although it was far removed from any major combat. A Confederate plot to capture the U.S. Navy warship, USS Michigan, and liberate Confederate prisoners from Johnson Island, in western Lake Erie, was narrowly averted only after the Confederates had captured two passenger steamships.

At the beginning of the 20th century, Detroit's industrialization took off on an unprecedented scale. The Detroit River became the world's busiest commercial river and in 1908 was dubbed "the Greatest Commercial Artery on Earth" by The Detroit News. In 1907, the Detroit River carried 67,292,504 tons (61 billion kg) of shipping commerce through Detroit to markets all over the world. By comparison, London shipped 18,727,230 tons (16 billion kg), and New York shipped 20,390,953 tons (18 billion kg).

=== Prohibition ===
From 1920 to 1933, the United States (US) enforced the Prohibition era. The sale, manufacture, and transportation of alcohol for consumption were nationally banned. Detroit, as the largest city bordering Canada, where alcohol remained legal during Prohibition, became the center of a new industry known as rum-running, smuggling liquor into the US.

No bridges connected Ontario, Canada and Michigan, US, until the Ambassador Bridge was finished in 1929 and the Detroit–Windsor Tunnel in 1930. Smugglers used boats of varying sizes to transport alcohol across the river during the summer, and during the winter months, rum-runners traveled back and forth across the frozen Detroit River by car. In some cases, overloaded cars fell through the ice. In the 21st century, car parts from this era are occasionally still found on the bottom of the river. Rum-running in Windsor and production of bootleg liquor became common practices. American mobsters such as the Purple Gang of Detroit used violence to control the route known as the "Detroit-Windsor Funnel", and continue to gain lucrative returns from the trade. The name parodied the newly built tunnel between the cities and nations. The Detroit River, Lake St. Clair, and the St. Clair River are estimated to have carried 75% of all liquor smuggled into the United States during Prohibition. Government officials were unable or unwilling to deter the flow.

The rum-running industry died when prohibition was repealed in 1933 by the Twenty-first Amendment.

=== Submerged objects ===
Because of the booming businesses and long history of Metro Detroit and Windsor, Ontario, the Detroit River has been the site of many artifacts, some lost with sunken ships and others abandoned, such as murder weapons or stolen bronze statues. A DMC DeLorean has also been recovered from the river. The artifacts recovered are well preserved due to the river's fresh water but low visibility makes them difficult to find.

A 1940s-era bronze statue depicting a classical nude woman was originally installed to overlook a reflecting pool in the Grosse Pointe War Memorial. It was nicknamed "The Nude", and, in 2001, was believed to have been successfully stolen for display in some art collector's private cache. During a police diving exercise near a submerged Jeep, the statue was found in 2009, restored, and returned to the memorial.

Anchors from the SS Greater Detroit, a luxury steamship that toured the Detroit River from 1924 to 1950, and the famed SS Edmund Fitzgerald, a lake freighter that sank in a 1975 storm on Lake Superior, have notably both been recovered from the river. The 6,000-pound (2,700 kg) anchor of the SS Greater Detroit was raised in November 2016. It was installed at the Detroit/Wayne County Port Authority Building. The lost anchor of the SS Edmund Fitzgerald was recovered during a July 1992 project, and the anchor was installed in the yard of the Dossin Great Lakes Museum on Belle Isle.

Since the 1980s, divers have recovered a total of six 1700s-era cannons from the river. The last was found in 2011 near the Cobo Center. They are believed to have been part of the pre-War of 1812 inventory kept by the British garrison in this area. Historians believe another three cannon may still be in the river. Inventory documents record a total of 17 cannons and 14 have been accounted for. It is believed that the British dragged the cannons onto the frozen river so they would sink with the spring thaw, and be kept from use by the American enemy. Another seven, larger cannons may have fallen off a barge closer to Amherstburg, Ontario, and may yet be found in the river.

=== Pollution and conservation efforts ===
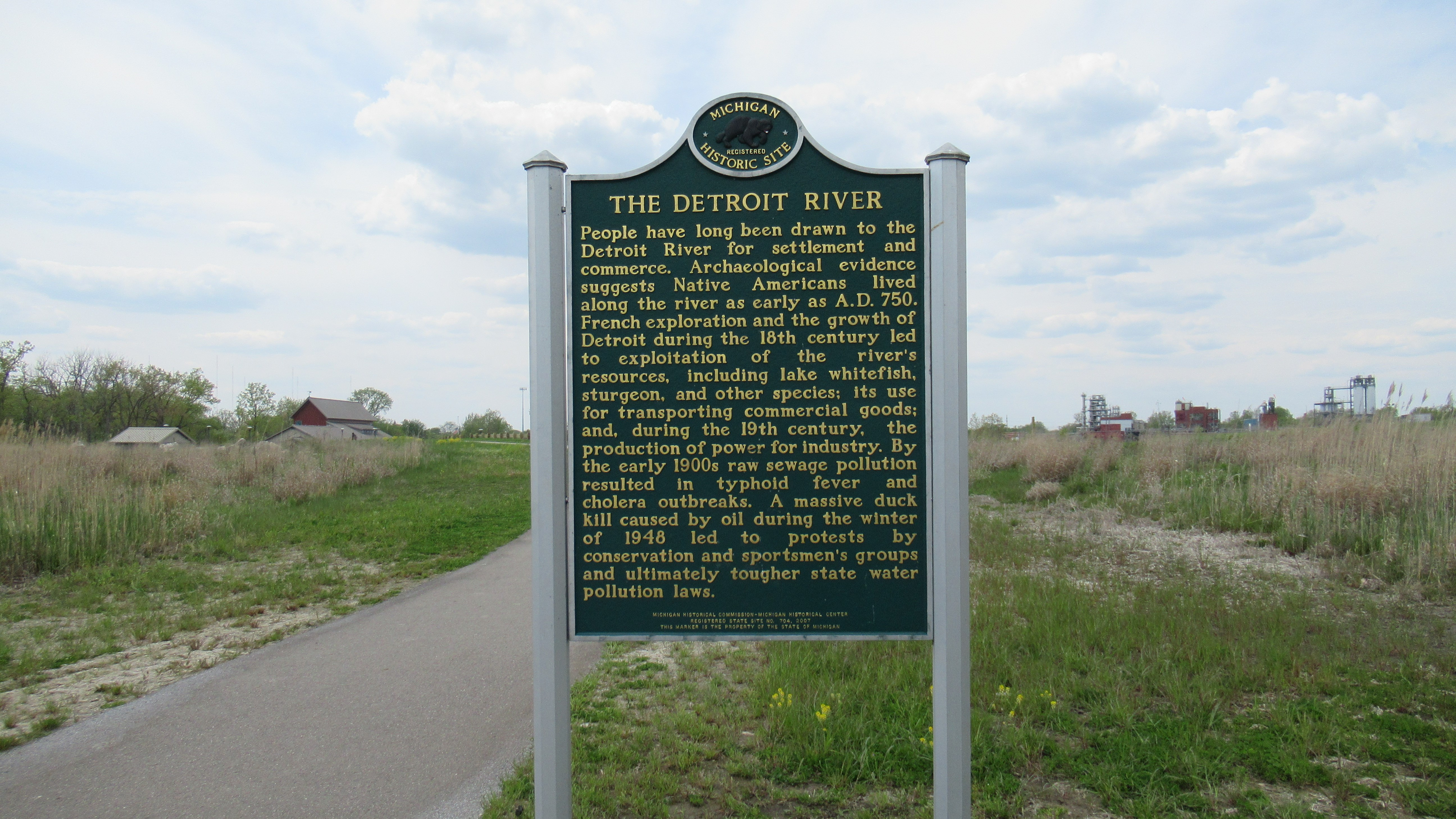
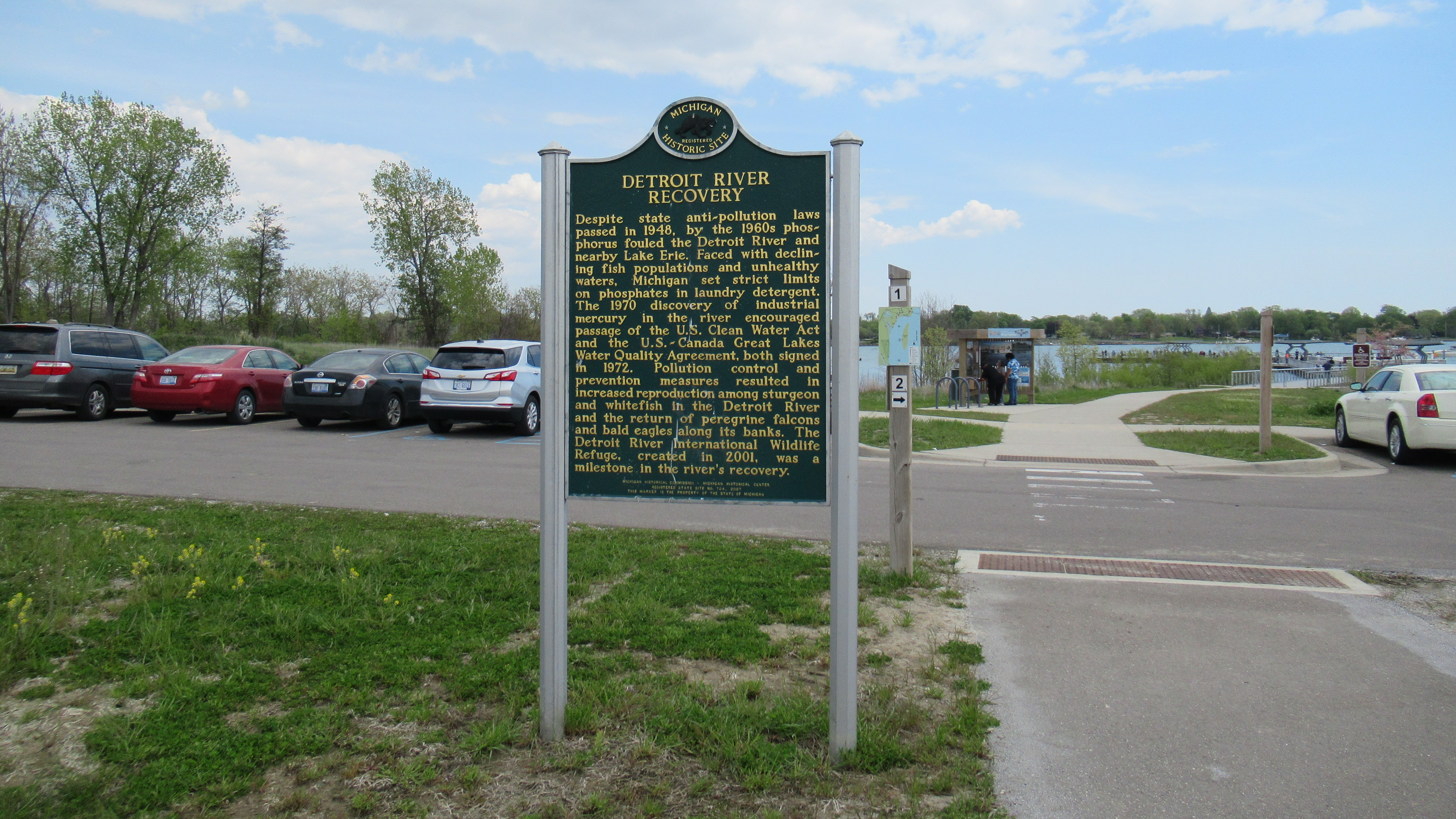
Both sides of the joint Detroit River / Detroit River Recovery historic marker in Trenton

Much of the land that surrounds the Detroit River is urbanized and, in some places, has been used for industrial purposes for more than 100 years. There has been excessive water pollution of the river from the long-term, unregulated dumping of chemicals, industrial waste, garbage, and sewage. Much of the Detroit River and its shoreline were polluted and unsafe for recreational use. Thousands of migrating birds died each year because of the oil slicks and contaminated water around the mouth of the Detroit River at Lake Erie. The river's oxygen levels were depleted to the point where fish could not inhabit its waters. Because this pollution often drained into and affected Lake Erie, the lake was considered "dead" and unable to support aquatic life.

In 1961, a congressional order founded the Wyandotte National Wildlife Refuge. That began the government's placing tighter restrictions on industries; substantial government funding at various levels has been allocated to clean up the river. In this early period, opponents believed that such efforts would adversely affect Detroit's industry and economy. In 1970, toxic levels of mercury in the water resulted in the total closing of the fishing industry in the St. Clair River, Lake St. Clair, the Detroit River, and Lake Erie. Finally, a massive conservation effort was initiated to clean up the Detroit River. For years, the multi-million dollar cost of removing pollutants from the river and the political influence of nearby industries, hindered conservation efforts.

In 1998, the Detroit River was designated as an American Heritage River by the US Environmental Protection Agency and in 2001 as a Canadian Heritage River. It is the only river in North America to have such dual designations.

In 2001, the Wyandotte National Wildlife Refuge was absorbed into the larger Detroit River International Wildlife Refuge, a cooperative effort between the United States and Canada to preserve the area as an ecological refuge. The millions of dollars spent since that time to dredge pollutants out of the Detroit River has led to a remarkable restoration, although problems remain. Today, many species of native animals that had been driven out by human development are returning to the area. The river is home to a growing number of bird species such as eagles (including reintroduced bald eagles), ospreys, and peregrine falcons. Large numbers of lake whitefish, sturgeon, silver bass, black bass, salmon, perch, and walleye are again thriving in the river.

The Detroit River and its recovery efforts were listed as a Michigan State Historic Site in 2007. A historic marker was erected along the river in a park that now serves as the Detroit River International Wildlife Refuge visitor center in the city of Trenton.

== Economy ==
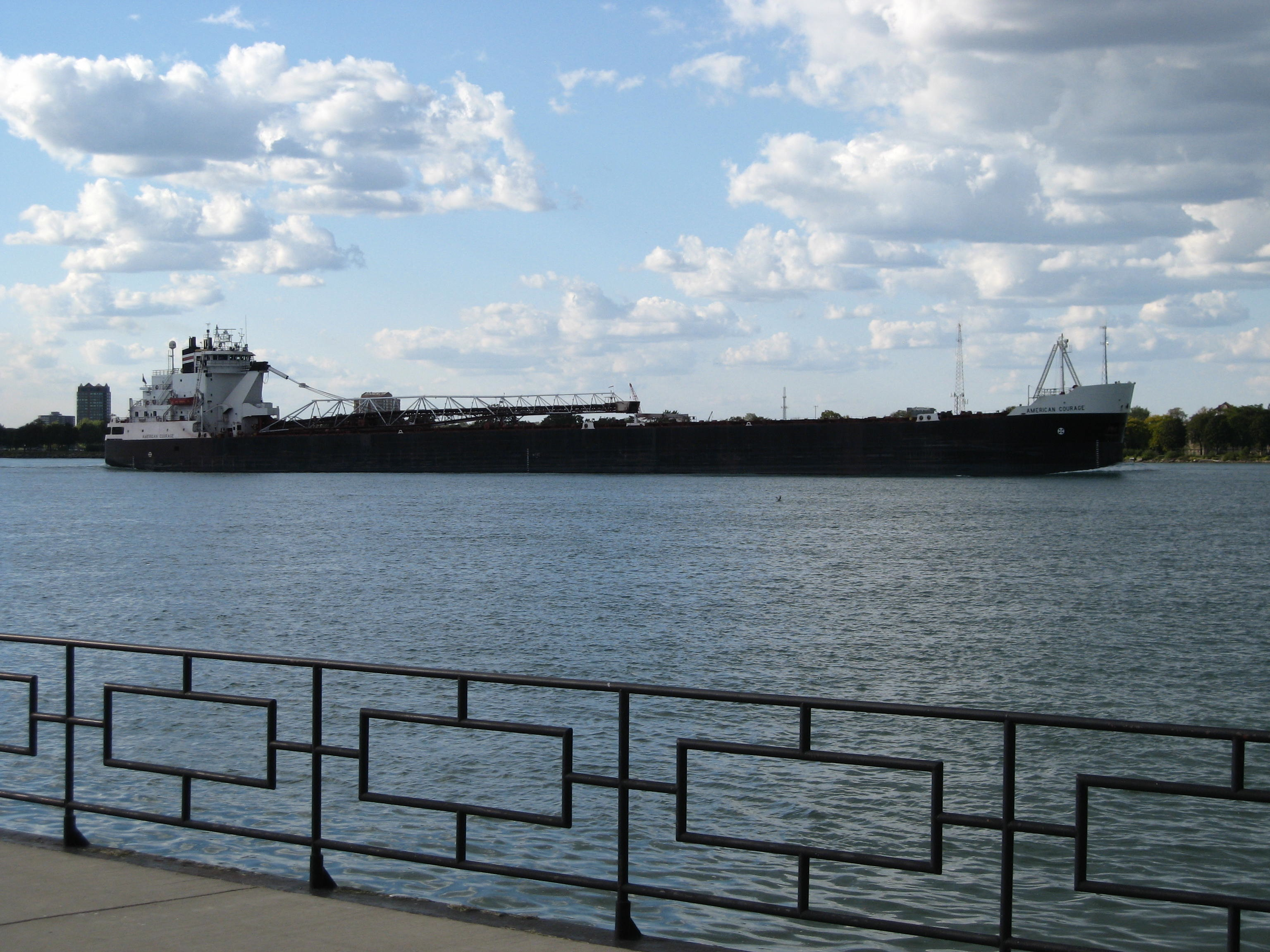
MV American Courage passing through the Detroit River. Lake freighters are a common sight on the river.

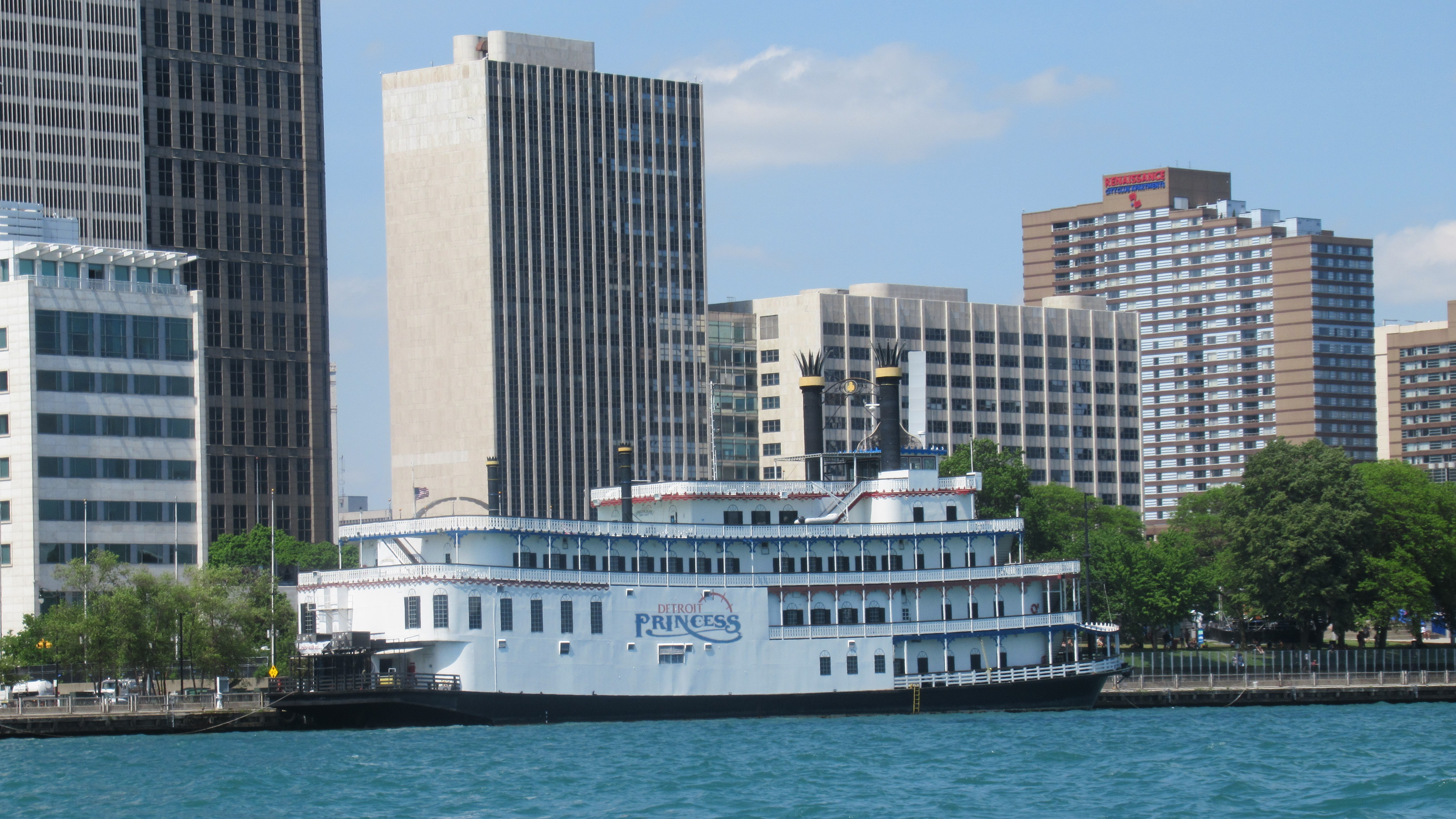
The Detroit Princess is one of many cruise ships on the river.

Detroit river flowing between Detroit on left and Windsor on right.

The Detroit River is used for shipping and trading. The earliest use of the river for these economic activities was the shipping of furs for trade as early as the 17th century. By the time the fur trade decreased, Michigan had begun to exploit the lumber-rich areas of Northern Michigan and the Upper Peninsula. Detroit turned into a major industrial region, largely because of the Detroit River. The only way a ship could travel out of the upper Great Lakes system was to travel down the Detroit River. From there, ships could travel anywhere in the world out of the St. Lawrence Seaway or the Erie Canal to New York City. At the beginning of the 20th century, the automotive industry boomed, and the many manufacturers imported abundant supplies of iron ore, sand, limestone and wood.

The Detroit River provides substantial revenue for the local economies. A 1991 study showed $20.1 million came from sales related to waterfowl hunting along the Detroit River. The same year, bird watching, photography, and other non-consumptive uses of waterfowl contributed another $192.8 million to Michigan's economy. Local economies benefit through boating registrations and fishing licenses. It is estimated walleye fishing alone brings in $1 million to the economy of communities along the lower Detroit River each spring. Other fish caught by recreational fisherman include white bass, bluegill, crappie, freshwater drum, smallmouth bass, northern pike and muskie. There are over 800,000 recreation boats in Michigan, and more than half of them are regularly used on or near the Detroit River. Popular river destinations in Detroit include the Detroit International Riverfront and Belle Isle Park — both of which host events throughout the year. Several restaurants on the river have docks for boaters. Tour boats and dinner cruises travel through the sights of Detroit and the undeveloped islands downriver. Cruise ships support tourism on the Great Lakes and dock at the Port Detroit passenger terminal downtown. The iconic Renaissance Center is on the banks of the Detroit River.

== Bridges and crossings ==
The Ambassador Bridge (foreground) and Gordie Howe International Bridge (background) in July 2025

According to a 2004 study, 150,000 jobs and $13 billion in annual production depend on the river crossings connecting Detroit to Windsor. In 2004, the American trade with Ontario alone was $407 billion, in which 28% ($113.3 billion) crossed the Detroit River.

There are two automobile traffic routes that completely cross the river: the Detroit–Windsor Tunnel and the privately owned Ambassador Bridge, both of which connect Detroit, Michigan, to Windsor, Ontario. A railway tunnel and a commercial truck ferry service also travel between Detroit and Windsor. In Michigan, there are two bridges connecting the mainland to Grosse Ile, as well as the MacArthur Bridge that connects the mainland Detroit to Belle Isle. All ports of entry on the American side are secured by the U.S. Customs and Border Protection, and the Canadian side is secured by the Canada Border Services Agency; all areas between the American ports of entry and on the American side of the river are secured by the United States Border Patrol.

The Gordie Howe International Bridge is a new bridge project which began construction in 2019; it directly connects Highway 401 in Canada with Interstate 75 in the United States.

| Crossing | Image | Carries | Connecting | Coordinates |
|---|---|---|---|---|
| Wayne County Bridge | | Grosse Ile Parkway | Trenton – Grosse Ile | 42°07′39.2″N 83°10′31.2″W |
| Grosse Ile Toll Bridge | | Bridge Road | Riverview – Grosse Ile | 42°10′20.9″N 83°09′34.3″W |
| Gordie Howe International Bridge | | | Detroit – Windsor | 42°17′16.8″N 83°05′51″W |
| Detroit–Windsor Truck Ferry | | Truck ferry services | Detroit – Windsor | 42°16′40.9″N 83°06′03.2″W |
| Ambassador Bridge | | Ambassador Bridge Street; LECT | Detroit – Windsor | 42°18′43.0″N 83°04′26.8″W |
| Michigan Central Railway Tunnel | | Canadian Pacific Railway | Detroit – Windsor | 42°19′06.6″N 83°03′37.8″W |
| Detroit–Windsor Tunnel | | | Detroit – Windsor | 42°19′28.2″N 83°02′24.2″W |
| MacArthur Bridge | | E. Grand Boulevard / Casino Way | Detroit – Belle Isle Park | 42°20′30.1″N 82°59′52.3″W |

== See also ==
- Canada–United States border
- Detroit–Windsor
- Detroit-Windsor Tunnel
- Detroit International Riverfront
- Detroit Water and Sewerage Department
- Great Lakes Water Authority
- List of international river borders
- List of islands in the Detroit River
- List of rivers of Michigan
- List of rivers of Ontario
- Renaissance Center
- Riverfront Towers
- William G. Milliken State Park and Harbor
- Windsor–Detroit International Freedom Festival
