= Detroit Water and Sewerage Department =

U.S. state public utility

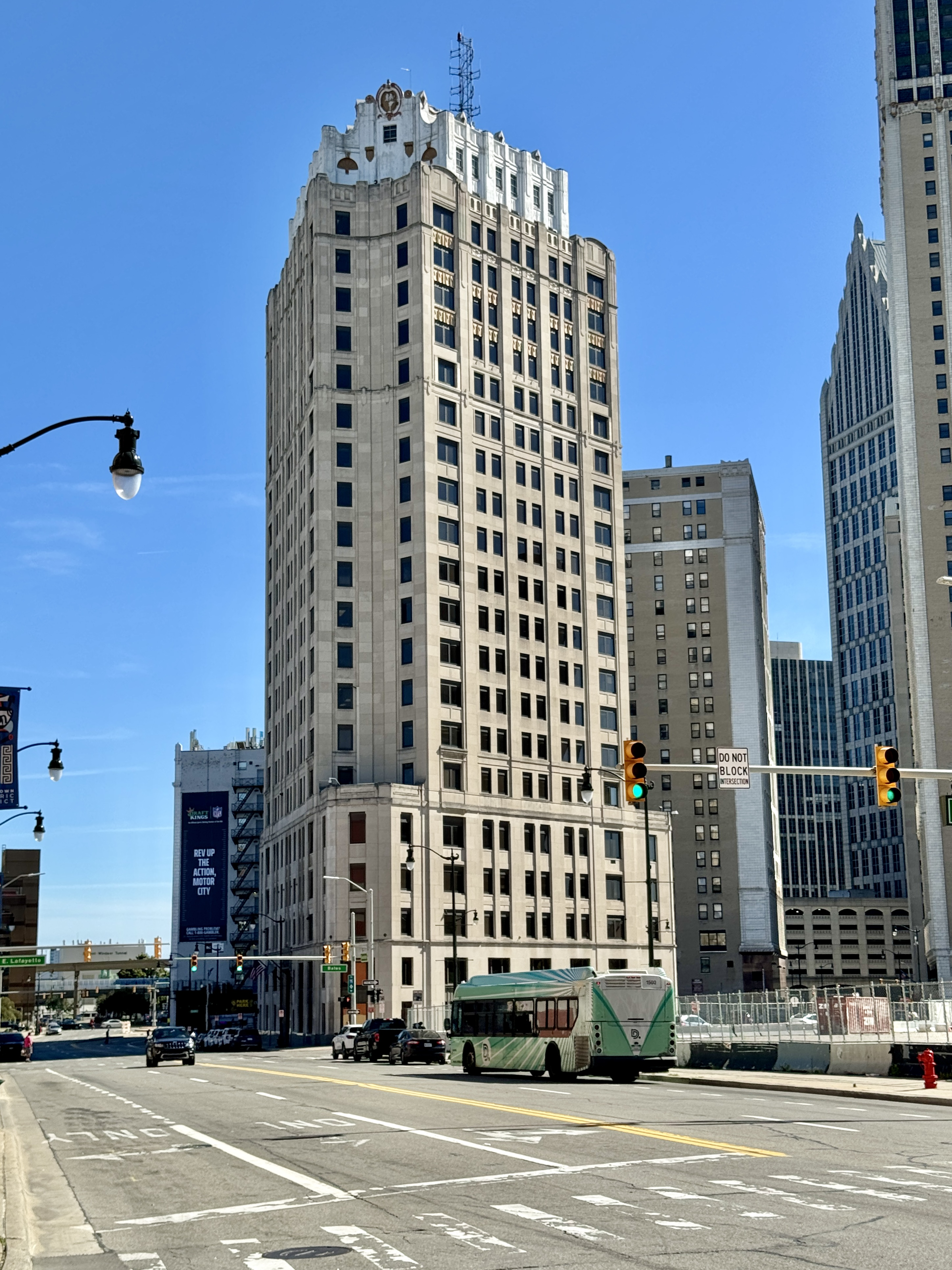
- Headquarters at the Water Board Building
- Headquarters: Water Board Building, Downtown Detroit
- Services: Water treatment and provision, sewerage
- Website: detroitmi.gov/departments/detroit-water-and-sewerage-department

The Detroit Water and Sewerage Department (DWSD) is a public utility that provides water and sewerage services for Detroit, Michigan. Originally owning and operating water treatment and wastewater facilities for most of the Metro Detroit region, it now only operates within the city of Detroit. As part of the city's bankruptcy restructuring, Great Lakes Water Authority was formed to operate and lease the system's assets outside of the city beginning in early 2016.

== Overview ==
The Detroit Water and Sewerage Department (DWSD) is the public utility responsible for delivering drinking water and managing sewer collection within the City of Detroit. As of 2025, DWSD serves more than 230,000 accounts — covering approximately 175,000 households and 30,000 businesses or nonprofits — and provides water service to about 630,000 residents. The water distribution system includes over 2,700 miles of water mains and around 29,000 fire hydrants. The sewer collection system spans nearly 3,000 miles of piping and includes more than 90,000 catch basins.

== History and evolution ==
The roots of Detroit’s municipal water service extend back to 1836, when the city began formalizing its public water supply operations.

A new water treatment plant was built on Jefferson Avenue in 1876, and its grounds were a public park known as Water Works Park. It included an iconic standpipe tower that was demolished in 1945, and the entrance was the monumental Hurlbut Memorial Gate. A larger treatment plant was built there in the 1920s. The current plant dates to 2003.

For many decades, the department was known as the Department of Water Supply (DWS). In 1973, under Detroit’s revised city charter, it was reorganized and renamed the Detroit Water and Sewerage Department (DWSD).

The department has occupied the historic Water Board Building at 735 Randolph Street since the early decades of the 20th century. The building was originally constructed in the late 1920s and gradually became the department’s primary headquarters by the 1990s.

In a 1992 survey, "nine of the 119 water purveyors that receive DWSD water indicated that considerable amounts of unlined cast-iron pipe were in place", and that "two-thirds of the eighteen survey respondents also indicated that red/rusty water occurrences were the most common cause of customer complaints". This was associated with the occurrence of iron uptake in the pipes.

In 2000, the DWSD provided water for around four million customers in Detroit and its metropolitan area. At this time, the department utilized five water treatment plants that were fed from three raw water intakes, two of which were sourced from the Detroit River and one of which was sourced from Lake Huron. The water treatment plants used the technologies of "pre-chlorination, rapid mix, flocculation, sedimentation, filtration and chlorine disinfection". At this time, the five water treatment plants were Waterworks Park, Springwells, Northeast, Southwest and Lake Huron.

In September 2014, as part of Detroit's bankruptcy restructuring plan, a deal was reached amongst regional authorities to transfer operation of the water system to Great Lakes Water Authority. The city of Detroit continues to own and operate water and sewage pipes, tunnels and plants within the city borders. Under the deal, the outdated system would receive $50 million in upgrades each year.

== Contemporary issues ==
=== Water Shut-Offs (2014) ===
Detroit has been in a water crisis since 2014, following Detroit's bankruptcy in 2013. In April, 2014, DWSD announced they were in debt $118 million due to unpaid water bills, attributed to residents who had not paid their water bills or paid late. DSWD announced the shutdown of over 150,000 residents’ access to water in response to their collected debt. The immediate shutoff affected 20,000 homes.

As of 24 June 2014, the Detroit Water and Sewerage Department has taken on significant debt and delinquent accounts, and has been under discussion for potential privatization. Efforts to collect on overdue billing has been characterized as an effort "to get rid of the bad debt associated with the water department and prep the public entity for privatization".

Per a June 2014 Democracy Now article:

The Detroit Water and Sewerage Department says half of its 323,000 accounts are delinquent and has begun turning off the taps of those who do not pay bills that total above $150 or that are 60 days late. Since March, up to 3,000 account holders have had their water cut off every week. The Detroit water authority carries an estimated $5 billion in debt and has been the subject of privatization talks.

Following the initial water shut-off, 7,210 more home lost access to water in June 2013. On June 10, 2013, protests began at Homrich Wrecking Inc., with protestors standing outside of the entrance gate to their office building, resulting in forceful removal by police. Protests continued through the summer, with about 3,000 homes receiving access to water again. In June 2014, activists from the Blue Planet Project had filed a "submission to the United Nations Special Rapporteur on the human right to safe drinking water and sanitation ... activists say Detroit is trying to push through a private takeover of its water system at the expense of basic rights." In mid-June, the Detroit City Council approved a tax, increasing the rate for water by 8.7%. In early July, more water shutoffs occurred. In response, local advocacy groups and residents began vocalizing concerns about violations of water human rights, especially with children and families being heavily affected by the water shutoffs. On July 21, 2014, the City of Detroit announced delays in further water shut-offs in response to public protest. July 22, DWSD announces they will be holding a Water Affordability Fair. Additionally, DSWD also announced a $1 million fund to help customers that couldn't afford their water bills.

On July 29, 2014, Detroit's Emergency Manager Kevyn Orr announced all power over DSWD would be transferred to Mayor Mike Duggan. Duggan promised to make changes to the water department, but did not promise or directly address turning water back on for residents, continuing to publicly agree with Orr's general policy about shutting off water for late or unpaid bills. However, Duggan criticized water department officials in their lack of sensitivity in handling the water shutoffs. A legal proceeding was filed on July 30, 2014, by two citizens who requested $4,400 in response to their water being turned off by the city.

In response to the public protests, DSWD hosted a Water Affordability Fair on August 2, 2014, an opportunity for residents to vocalize concerns and questions about the water shut-offs. Additionally, DSWD marketed the ability to assist customers with financial hardship. Despite this, additional water shutoffs are announced on August 4. Following continued and heightened backlash from the public and media, the City of Detroit announced the sale of DWSD, due to $5.2 billion in debt the department was facing.

Duggan announced on August 7, 2014, a ten-point plan to address water bill collection while also being able to turn water back on for some residents. Following this announcement, on August 18, General Motors Co. and Ford Motor Co. announced they will donate thousands to the Detroit Water fund, as major and prominent companies in the Detroit Metro Area. United Way also donated money to the fund, resulting in $200,000 total being granted to the Detroit Water Fund. On August 25, 2014, DSWD announced that the temporary halt to new shutoffs would stop, and shutoffs continued.

==== Environmental Injustice ====
The 2014 Detroit Water Shutoffs are considered a form of environmental injustice. The shutoffs predominantly affected marginalized communities economically and racially.

Residents and activists argued that those being affected by the water shutoffs were individual residents in lower-income and predominantly African American areas. Larger corporations (such as Joe Louis Arena and Ford Field) had much larger unpaid water bills, but still had access to water through DWSD. Private golf courses and clubs in the area faced similar backlash from the press and protestors, with bills of over $100,000 accumulating but still having access to water.

Various activist groups became involved in the water shutoff conflict, including the Detroit Water Brigade, with a direct but nonviolent action plan in protest. On July 21, 2014, a group of Detroit residents filed a class-action lawsuit with the U.S. Bankruptcy Court. The basis of their suit was that the shutoff of low-income households' access to water violates Constitutional rights.

There has not been a definitive solution to this conflict, as water shutoffs continue to happen in Detroit, with over 50,000 additional shutoffs happening between 2014 and 2020.

=== COVID-19 Response ===
As of March 9, 2020, the City of Detroit has instituted a COVID-19 Water Restart Plan to keep water flowing during the pandemic. Residents are eligible for this plan if their water service was recently paused because they missed a payment or if they received a notice that their service may be interrupted. This plan is in effect until December 31, 2020, and it costs $25 per month. Normally, residents pay almost four times that amount. The Detroit Water and Sewage Department (DWSD) reports that in the first 90 days of the Water Restart Plan, service was restored to twelve hundred occupied homes. Even in non-covid times, many residents in Detroit struggle to pay their water bills which leads to shutoffs.

Separate from the COVID-19 Water Restart Plan, water activists have been fighting for a sliding-scale affordability program for water in Detroit for many years. Activists believe that this type of solution addresses the root of the problem which is that water rates are unaffordable for low-income households. However, city officials oppose sliding-scale programs and instead continue to focus on individual assistance programs like the Water Residential Assistance Program. It is unclear what will happen to residents when the Water Restart Plan ends at the end of this year though it is clear that the push for a more affordable, sustainable urban water system in Detroit will continue.

80% of Detroit residents who do not have access to water in their homes share or borrow water from friends and family which potentially creates a transmission path for the coronavirus. The safety of residents during the time of the pandemic was a major factor in the government's decision to enact the Water Restart Plan.
