= Great Lakes Water Authority =

Regional water authority in Michigan, United States

Agency overview
- Formed: 2014
- Preceding agency: Detroit Water and Sewerage Department
- Type: Special district
- Headquarters: Water Board Building, Downtown Detroit
- Motto: One Water, One Team
- Employees: 1033
- Agency executive: Suzanne Coffey, PE, Chief Executive Officer
- Website: glwater.org

The Great Lakes Water Authority (GLWA) is a regional water authority in the U.S. state of Michigan. It provides drinking water treatment, drinking water distribution, wastewater collection, and wastewater treatment services in Southeast Michigan, including Wayne, Oakland, and Macomb counties, among others. GLWA operates much of the regional water and sewer infrastructure that formerly operated and maintained by the Detroit Water and Sewerage Department (DWSD) prior to the Detroit bankruptcy in the early 2010s.

== History ==
The Great Lakes Water Authority was created in the fall of 2014 under a United States bankruptcy court order issued as part of the City of Detroit bankruptcy proceedings. The Detroit City Council voted to join the authority in September 2014 by a 7–2 vote, and the county commissions of Wayne, Oakland, and Macomb counties voted to join in October 2014. The first meeting of the GLWA board was held on December 12, 2014.

The 40-year lease deal was approved on June 12, 2015, by a 5–1 vote of the Great Lakes Water Authority board, marking a historic regionalization of water control hailed by Detroit Mayor Mike Duggan. The assumption of much of Detroit Water and Sewerage Department's (DWSD) operations by the Great Lakes Water Authority will allow Detroit to fund improvements to Detroit's aging water infrastructure, such as repairs to old treatment facilities and leaking pipes. The lease payments to Detroit must be used for water purposes, and cannot be diverted to the general fund. The deal allows DWSD's workforce to be reduced from around 1,400 to around 500. The Great Lakes Water Authority will have about 900 employees.

In October 2015, following a nationwide search, Sue McCormick, the director of the Detroit Water and Sewerage Department, was named the first chief executive officer of the Great Lakes Water Authority.

GLWA formally assumed operations from the Detroit Water Sewer District on January 1, 2016. The GLWA also assumed $4 billion of DWSD's debt. The assumption of Detroit's operations and debt is under a 40-year lease that GLWA has over the City of Detroit's water system. The lease agreement was brokered in secret mediation by U.S. District Judge Sean Cox and required "lengthy and contentious negotiations" between Detroit and suburban Detroit leaders, who feared any prospect of bailing out Detroit's water system. Under the agreement, the authority will pay the City "$50 million a year plus about $50 million a year toward pension costs and a fund to help struggling customers" in exchange for the city's water system.

== Governance ==
The Great Lakes Water Authority is governed by a board of directors. It consists of two representatives of the City of Detroit and one representative each from Oakland County, Macomb County, Wayne County, and the State of Michigan. The Detroit representatives are appointed by the mayor, the county representatives are appointed by their respective counties, and the state representative is appointed by the governor. The governor's appointee is intended to represent users of the water authority's services outside Oakland, Macomb, and Wayne, such as users in Washtenaw, Genesee, and Monroe counties.

The primary administrative center for the GLWA is the Water Board Building, which is located at 735 Randolph Street in downtown Detroit, Michigan. The Water Board Building houses the meeting chamber for the Board of Directors, and includes offices for the management officers for the GLWA.

Sue McCormick, who led GLWA since its inception, submitted her resignation as CEO on July 28, 2021. McCormick stepped down after increased pressure from local leaders when a loss of sewer pumping capacity happened during the June 28 rainfall event which realized six inches of rainfall depth over the Detroit metropolitan area. Suzanne Coffey, previously the agency's chief planning officer was named interim CEO by the GLWA Board of Directors on August 11, 2021. On June 27, 2022, it was announced that she would be promoted to permanent CEO.

Board of Directors
Name	Position	Representing
Brian Baker	Board Chairperson	Macomb County
Mark Miller	Board Vice-Chairperson	State of Michigan
John J. Zech	Board Secretary	Wayne County
Jaye Quadrozzi	Member	Oakland County
Freman Hendrix	Member	City of Detroit
Gary A. Brown	Member	City of Detroit

== Services ==
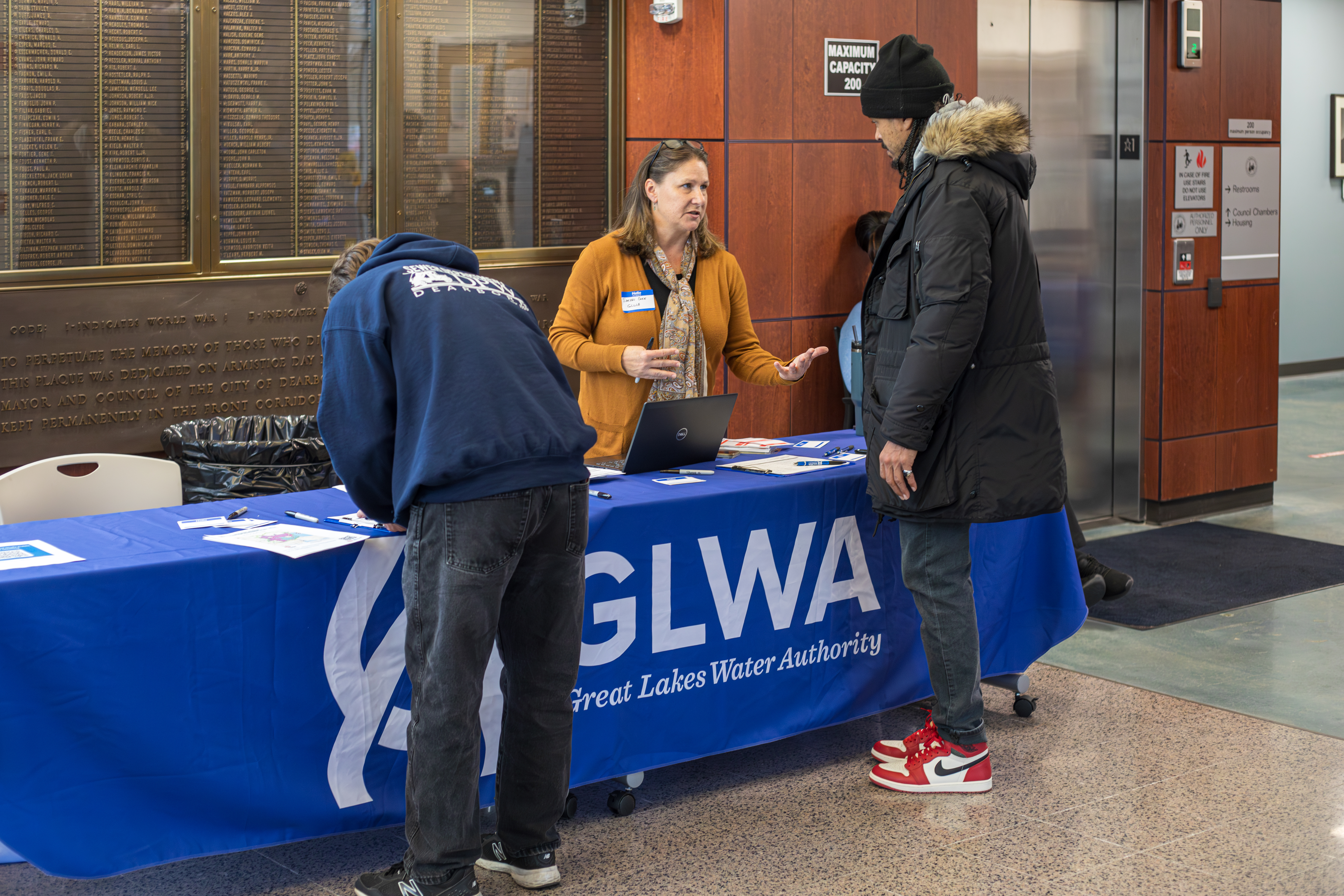
GLWA staff at a 2024 community event

The utility authority provides drinking water treatment, water transmission, wastewater collection, and wastewater treatment services to almost four million customers from about 125 Michigan communities in Wayne, Oakland, Macomb, and other counties. About 75% of the authority's customers reside in the suburbs, with the remaining customers residing in the City of Detroit. The GLWA operates combined sewer overflow (CSO) facilities, drinking water booster pump stations, drinking water in-system storage, and wastewater pump stations. Small-diameter local water distribution mains and sanitary sewer in the local communities remain under their individual control.

The Central Services Facility (CSF) located at 6425 Huber Street in Detroit serves as the headquarters for all of the field maintenance staff which operate and maintain the non-treatment assets within the water distribution and wastewater collection service area. These assets include the large capacity raw sewage pumping stations which serve to lift sewage along the main interceptors, as well as the in-system drinking water booster stations which are located throughout the water distribution system. The CSF houses a central fusion control center which serves as a central control hub that can supervise the operation of all the treatment facilities, as well as the combined sewer overflow (CSO) assets, and security camera feeds for all GLWA properties.

Distribution system member communities

- Allen Park
- Auburn Hills
- Belleville
- Berkley
- Beverly Hills
- Bingham Farms
- Birmingham
- Bloomfield Hills
- Bloomfield Township
- Clawson
- Dearborn
- Dearborn Heights
- Ecorse
- Farmington
- Farmington Hills
- Ferndale
- Garden City
- Grosse Ile
- Grosse Pointe
- Grosse Pointe Farms
- Grosse Pointe Park
- Grosse Pointe Shores
- Grosse Pointe Woods
- Hamtramck
- Hazel Park
- Harper Woods
- Highland Park
- Huron Township
- Inkster
- Lathrup Village
- Livonia
- Melvindale
- Mt. Clemens
- New Haven
- Novi
- Oak Park
- Plymouth
- Redford
- River Rouge
- Riverview
- Rochester Hills
- Romulus
- Royal Oak
- Royal Oak Township
- Southfield
- Southgate
- Sterling Heights
- Taylor
- Trenton
- Troy
- Utica
- Walled Lake
- Warren
- Washington Township
- Wayne
- West Bloomfield
- Westland
- Wixom
- Woodhaven

The authority has not yet set water rates (which could be variable by community), although it aims to determine rates by March 2016 and make them effective by July 1, 2016. Annual rate increases will be capped at four percent for the first ten years of the authority's existence.

== Structure ==
=== Drinking Water Treatment ===
GLWA operates five drinking water treatment plants, one wastewater reclamation facility, nine combined sewer overflow treatment/screening facilities, water storage facilities/booster pump stations, and a central service maintenance facility. These facilities are located within the greater Detroit metropolitan area; however, the Lake Huron Water Treatment Plant is located in Fort Gratiot Township, north of Port Huron, Michigan.

The drinking water facilities all utilize a sedimentation and deep bed filtration process to treat and purify drinking water for the residents of their service areas. Disinfection of the treated water is accomplished by either chlorination or ozonation processes.

Drinking Water Treatment Facilities
Facility	Location	Municipality	Date of Construction	Rated Capacity (MGD)	Max Pumping Capacity (MGD)	Finished Water Storage (MG)	Source Water	Service Area
Waterworks Park Water Treatment Plant	10100 East Jefferson Avenue	Detroit	1879 Original 2003 Expanded	240	560	28	Detroit River	East Detroit/Wayne County
Northeast Water Treatment Plant	11036 East 8 Mile Road	Detroit	1956	300	400	30	Detroit River	Northeast Detroit/Wayne County, Southern Macomb County, Southeast Oakland County
Springwells Water Treatment Plant	8300 West Warren Avenue	Dearborn	1930 First Train 1958 Second Train	540	450	60	Detroit River - Belle Isle Intake	Detroit and Northern Wayne County, Eastern Washtenaw County, Oakland County, Southeastern Macomb County
Southwest Water Treatment Plant	14700 Moran Road	Allen Park	1964	240	310	30	Detroit River	Southern Wayne County, Northern Monroe County, Eastern Washtenaw County
Lake Huron Water Treatment Plant	3993 Metcalf Road	Fort Gratiot Township	1974	400	420	44	Lake Huron	Genessee County, Lapeer County, St. Clair County, Monroe County, Oakland County
			Totals	1,720	2,400	192		

=== Drinking Water Distribution ===
Drinking Water Storage and Booster Pump Stations
Facility Name	Address	Municipality	Function	Storage Capacity (MG)
Adams Road Pump Station	6201 Adams Road	Bloomfield Hills	Booster Pump Station	
Eastside Station	18301 East Warren Ave	Detroit	Water Storage and Booster Pump Station	
Electric Avenue Station	1140 Montie Avenue	Lincoln Park	Water Storage and Booster Pump Station	
Ford Road Station	26015 Ford Road	Dearborn Heights	Water Storage and Booster Pump Station	
Franklin Station	7404 Inkster Road	West Bloomfield	Water Storage and Booster Pump Station	
Haggerty Station	39955 West 14 Mile Road	Novi	Water Storage and Booster Pump Station	70
Imlay Pump Station	430 Wheeling Road	Imlay City	Water Storage and Booster Pump Station	
Joy Road Station	43127 Joy Road	Canton Township	Water Storage and Booster Pump Station	
Newburgh Station	36363 West 8 Mile Road	Livonia	Booster Pump Station	
North Service Center	1850 East South Boulevard	Troy	Water Storage and Booster Pump Station	
Northwest Station	20440 James Couzens Freeway	Detroit	Water Storage and Booster Pump Station	
Orion Station	3655 Giddings Road	Auburn Hills	Booster Pump Station	
Rochester Station	2851 East 24 Mile Road	Shelby Township	Booster Pump Station	
Schoolcraft Pump Station	30365 Schoolcraft Road	Livonia	Water Storage and Booster Pump Station	
West Chicago Street	28720 West Chicago Street	Livonia	Water Storage and Booster Pump Station	
West Service Center	20920 East Street	Southfield	Water Storage and Booster Pump Station	
Wick Pump Station	32280 Wick Road	Romulus	Water Storage and Booster Pump Station	
Ypsilanti Station	361 Rawsonville Road	Van Buren Township	Booster Pump Station	

== Combined Sewer Overflow Prevention and Pollution Control ==
The Great Lakes Water Authority operates and maintains nine individual combined sewer overflow pollution prevention facilities located within the original combined sewer service area. These facilities were planned and constructed in the late 1990's through the early 2000's to contain and treat wet-weather wastewater flows which originated in the legacy combined sewer areas of the Detroit metro area.

The City of Detroit was originally developed and as water and sewer services grew within the existing municipal boundary of the City, the sanitary sewer and stormwater sewers were built as a combined sewer system. Combined sewer systems were designed to convey both dry weather sanitary waste, and during wet weather events, carry the runoff generated from the surrounding homes, business, and impervious land uses. During wet weather, these historic outfalls would discharge raw sewage directly into the downstream receiving water bodies, such as the Rouge River and Detroit River. The Clean Water Act required the City of Detroit to address these raw sewage outfalls by constructing the CSO pollution control facilities to prevent untreated sewage from entering the local waterways.

GLWA Combined Sewer Overflow Facilities
Facility Name	Location	Function	Municipality	Downstream Receiving Waterbody	Coordinates
Belle Isle CSO Retention and Treatment Basin	1500 Belle Isle	Retention of Combined Sewerage	Detroit	Detroit River	42°20′19.95″N 82°59′51.35″W
Conner Creek CSO Retention and Treatment Basin	11900 Freud Street	Retention of Combined Sewerage Screening of Floatables Disinfection of Overflow Effluent	Detroit	Detroit River	42°21′45.15″N 82°57′28.93″W
Leib CSO Screening and Disinfection Facility	2198 Mt. Elliott Street	Screening of Floatables Disinfection of Overflow Effluent	Detroit	Detroit River	42°21′14.93″N 83°0′58.75″W
St. Aubin CSO Screening and Disinfection Facility	2122 Atwater Street	Screening of Floatables Disinfection of Overflow Effluent	Detroit	Detroit River	42°20′1.59″N 83°1′21.56″W
Oakwood CSO Retention and Treatment Basin	12082 Pleasant Avenue	Retention of Combined Sewerage Screening of Floatables	Detroit	Rouge River	42°16′57.26″N 83°8′37.14″W
Baby Creek CSO Retention and Treatment Basin	9545 Dix Avenue	Retention of Combined Sewerage Screening of Floatables Disinfection of Overflow Effluent	Dearborn	Rouge River	42°18′28.96″N 83°8′26.79″W
Hubbell-Southfield CSO Retention and Treatment Basin	16200 Rotunda Drive	Retention of Combined Sewerage Screening of Floatables	Dearborn	Rouge River	42°18′29.43″N 83°12′23.89″W
Puritan-Fenkell CSO Retention and Treatment Basin	23675 Fenkell Avenue	Retention of Combined Sewerage	Detroit	Rouge River	42°23′57.67″N 83°16′19.07″W
Seven Mile CSO Retention and Treatment Basin	19300 Shiawassee Drive	Retention of Combined Sewerage	Detroit	Rouge River	42°25′53.95″N 83°16′20.71″W

=== Intermediate Sewage Pump Stations ===
GLWA Sewage Pump Stations
Facility Name	Location	Function	Municipality	Coordinates
Bluehill Pump Station	Mack Avenue	Combined Sewer Pumping Station on Detroit River Interceptor	Detroit	42°23′46.77″N 82°55′19.21″W
Conner Creek Pump Station		Combined Sewer Pumping Station on Detroit River Interceptor	Detroit	
Freud Pump Station	669 Tennessee Street	Combined Sewer Pumping Station	Detroit	42°21′51.14″N 82°57′24.95″W
Fairview Pump Station		Combined Sewer Pumping Station on Detroit River Interceptor	Detroit	
Northeast Pump Station	11000 East 8 Mile Road	Sewer Pumping Station	Detroit	42°26′31.76″N 83°0′47.96″W
Woodmere Pump Station		Combined Sewer Pumping Station on Oakwood Interceptor	Detroit	

=== Water Resource Recovery/ Wastewater Pollution Control ===
All of the wastewater collected from the Great Lakes Water Authority sewer service area is treated at one facility, the GLWA Water Resource Recovery Facility. The Water Resource Recovery Facility is located at 9300 W. Jefferson Avenue, and is the second largest single-site wastewater treatment facility in North America. The initial phase of the plant was completed in 1940, at a cost of $10 million. Today the facility is rated for a maximum wastewater treatment capacity of 1890 million gallons/day of wet-weather sewage treatment. The Water Resource Recovery Facility (WRRF) is classified as a wet-weather wastewater treatment facility, as it sees sewage flows fluctuate depending on rainfall depth over the sewer collection area. When the City of Detroit was originally sewered for wastewater collection, the system was designed to collect stormwater runoff in addition to household and industrial sanitary wastewater.

Two interceptors convey raw sewage to the Water Resource Recovery Facility. The Detroit River Interceptor (DRI) follows the Detroit River riverbank, and collects sewage from the eastern sewer service area, ultimately following Jefferson Boulevard and arriving at Pump Station No. 1 from the south. The Oakwood Interceptor conveys raw sewage from the western service area which comprises Dearborn and the western suburbs. The Oakwood Interceptor arrives at the WRRF from the north. Each interceptor was originally designed to ultimately land at Pump Station No. 1 when the WRRF was placed in service in 1940.

The original wastewater treatment works were further upgraded in 1953 and 1957, in which additional primary clarification was added to the process. Polymer and ferric chloride feed systems were added to the plant in 1970, including a new chlorine feed system. The Federal Water Pollution Control Act (Clean Water Act) of 1972 drove the need add secondary treatment capacity to the facility, which included the construction of aeration tanks, secondary clarifiers, cryogenic oxygen plants and additional biosolids handling facilities at the plant.

The WRRF includes two medium-lift pump stations, fourteen primary clarifiers (circular and rectangular), four secondary aeration basins, thirty secondary clarifiers, twenty-two sludge dewatering belt filter presses, eight multiple-hearth furnace incinerators, and a chlorination/dechlorination facility for managing the disinfection and subsequent residual chlorine removal of the final treated effluent.

Water Resource Recovery Facility
Process Component	Process Description	Equipment	Downstream Liquid Process	Downstream Solids Process
Pump Station No. 1	Lifts raw sewage from the Detroit River Interceptor and the Oakwood Interceptor Removes floatable trash Removes non-organic sediments, grit, and gravel Application of Ferric Chloride for improved settling Houses eight Medium Lift Pumps	Eight Flowserve Medium Lift Pumps rated for 135 to 230 MGD	Bar Screens and Grit Chamber Primary Clarifiers	
Pump Station No. 2	Lifts raw sewage from the Oakwood Interceptor Removes floatable trash Removes non-organic sediments, grit, and gravel Houses eight Medium Lift Pumps	Eight Flowserve Medium Lift Pumps rated at 95 MGD	Bar Screens and Grit Chamber Primary Clarifiers	
Primary Clarification	Removes primary organic wastewater particles via gravity settling Basins are both circular and rectangular basin configurations	Six Evoqua 180 MGD Circular Primary Clarifiers Twelve Chain-and-Flight Rectangular Clarifiers	Aeration Basins	Biosolids Dewatering
Aeration Basin	Biological nutrient removal process which is used to remove nitrogen, phosphorus, and additional organic materials which did not settle during primary treatment Utilizes surface mixers and liquid oxygen diffusers to encourage bacterial consumption of organic fraction of sewage	Four 310 MGD Activated Sludge Aeration Basins	Secondary Clarifiers	
Secondary Clarifiers	Removes waste-activated sludge particles via gravity settling Recycles waste activated sludge to upstream end of aeration basins	Twenty five Secondary Clarifiers rated for 40 MGD each	Chlorine Contact Conduits	Biosolids Dewatering
Chlorination	Produces chlorinated solution water for the disinfection of secondary treated effluent. Chlorine gas is introduced into potable process water to generate hypochlorous acid	Ten chlorine gas feeders capable of 8,000 lb/day	Detroit River/Rouge River	
Dechlorination	Produces sulfonated solution water for the removal of chlorine residuals in final disinfected effluent	Eight sulfur dioxide gas feeders capable of 7,600 lb/day	Detroit River/Rouge River	
Dewatering	Twelve Ashbrook Belt Filter Presses	Ten Komline-Sanderson Belt Filter Presses Twelve Ashbrook Belt Filter Presses	Oakwood Interceptor	
Incineration	Multiple hearth furnaces incinerate dewatered wastewater sludge cake Flue gases are scrubbed and desulfurized prior to atmospheric discharge	Eight Nichols-Hereschoff Multiple Hearth Furnaces	Oakwood Interceptor	
Biosolids Drying Facility	Four train drum drying facility which produces a pelletized fertilizer product which is wholesale distributed. This process is operated by the New England Fertilizer Company (NEFCO).	Four drum dryers with capacity of 421 dry tons/day	Detroit River Interceptor for centrifuge centrate	

The WRRF relies on a liquid oxygen generation system to produce the oxygen necessary for the activated sludge aeration process used to manage the biological nutrient removal process.

== Incidents ==
On the early morning of March 4, 2016 a two-alarm fire broke out in the Incineration facility at the Great Lakes Water Authority Water Resource Recovery Facility at 9300 West Jefferson Avenue, Detroit. The fire event significantly damaged belt conveyors which are utilized to feed dewatered process biosolids into the eight operational incinerators located within the main superstructure of the building. The resulting fire damaged nine large belt conveyors, and resulted in roughly $40 million in overall damage to the facility. The fire was investigated by outside engineering consultants, citing excessive sludge debris buildup, lack of maintenance, and poor operational practices as being the cause of the catastrophic fire.

On the weekend of June 28, 2021, heavy rainfall events partially disabled the Conner Creek Pump Station and Freud Pump Stations which serve the eastside combined sewer service area near the Detroit River. Both pump stations are located near the GLWA Conner Creek CSO facility. Ongoing investigations by an outside consultant are being completed to determine the exact cause of reduced sewage pumping capacity which led to thousands of basements in the Grosse Pointe and Chalmers areas being flooded with raw sewage.

On August 21, 2022, a break occurred on an existing 120-inch diameter water transmission immediately downstream of the Lake Huron Water Treatment Plant which is located in Fort Gratiot Township. The break resulted in a Boil Water Advisory which affected 23 communities across the service downstream which was served by the 120-inch watermain. The existing main was a concrete precast transmission line. Repairs to the main were completed on September 6, 2022. GLWA indicated that due to the size of the main, full operational capacity of the transmission line would not be restored until September 21, 2022.

On January 26, 2024, a break occurred on an existing 30-inch diameter water transmission main on Baseline Road, resulting in loss of roadway between Novi Street and Oakland Avenue in Northville, Michigan. Several homes near the break experienced flooding, with local customers being asked to reduce water consumption while the break is repaired.

On February 17, 2025, a break occurred on an existing 54-inch diameter water transmission main running along Beard Street, resulting in extensive residential flooding of approximately 200 homes in the vicinity and southwest of Beard Street and Rowan Street. The break occurred within the intersection of Beard Street and Rowan Street An extensive sinkhole formed due to the washout of roadway material, with work crews struggling to find isolation valves under heavy ice and snow. Residents reported up to five feet of water in basements due to the floodwater from this main break. Vehicles which were parked in the roadway were flooded and frozen in-place due to the sub-freezing temperatures reported while the watermain was free flowing. Representatives from GLWA indicated that the watermain material is steel pipe, and constructed in the 1930s.
