= Detroit–Windsor Truck Ferry =

American ferry service (1990–2023)

Coordinates: 42°17′21.4″N 83°06′14.5″W

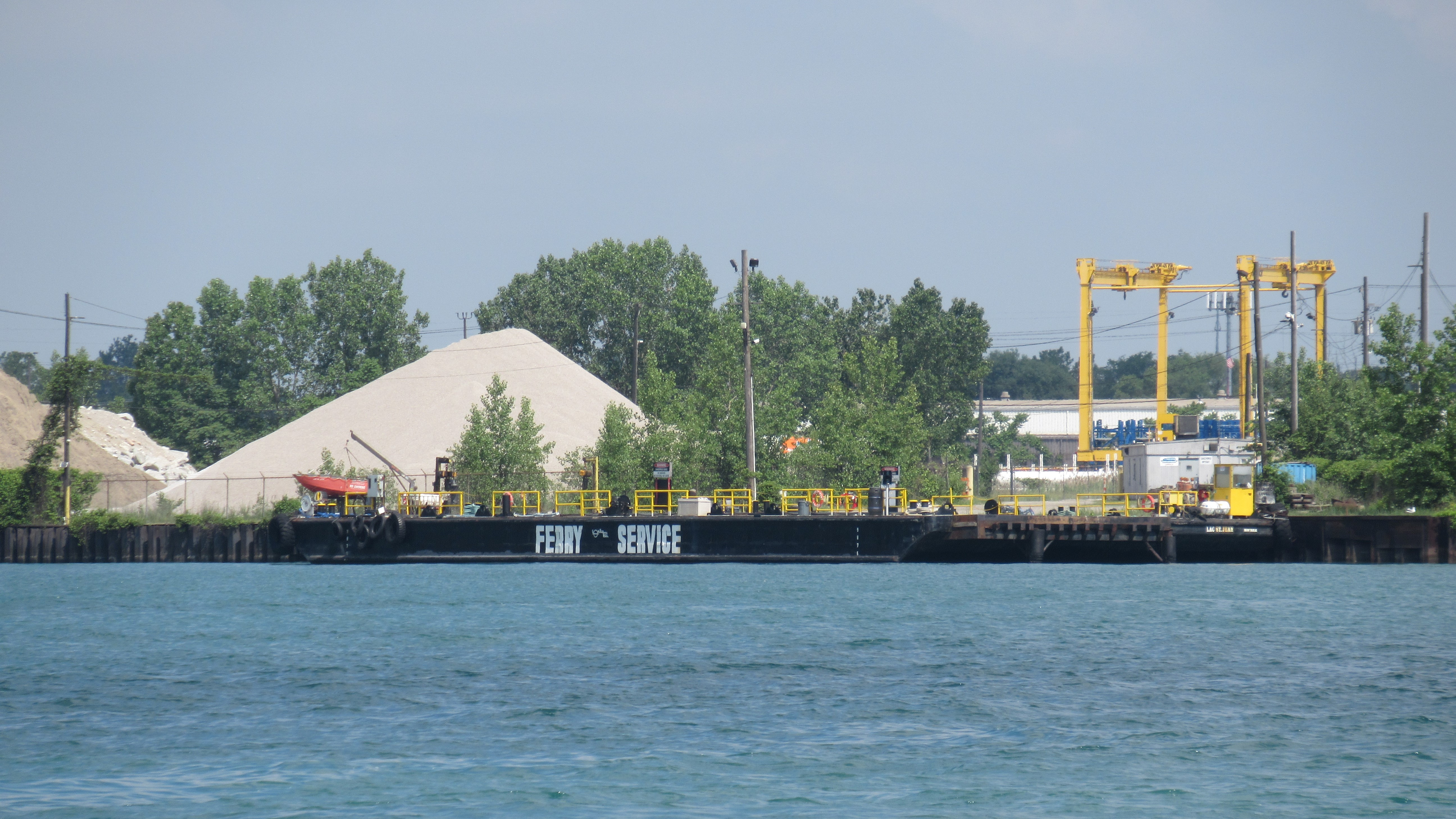
The ferry docked in Detroit

The Detroit–Windsor Truck Ferry was a ferry service that transported trucks between Detroit, Michigan, United States and Windsor, Ontario, Canada, via the Detroit River. It operated from 1990 to 2023.

The service was split between two companies, Detroit–Windsor Truck Ferry, Incorporated of Detroit and CMT Canadian Maritime Transport, Limited of Windsor.

== Overview ==
The ferry began operations on Earth Day, April 22, 1990, and shut down on September 30, 2023. It was the primary crossing for trucks carrying hazardous materials in the Detroit-Windsor area, as those goods were banned from the Ambassador Bridge from 1994 to 2024; the nearest land crossing allowing hazardous materials was the Blue Water Bridge. The nearby, Gordie Howe International Bridge allow these cargos after opening in 2026.

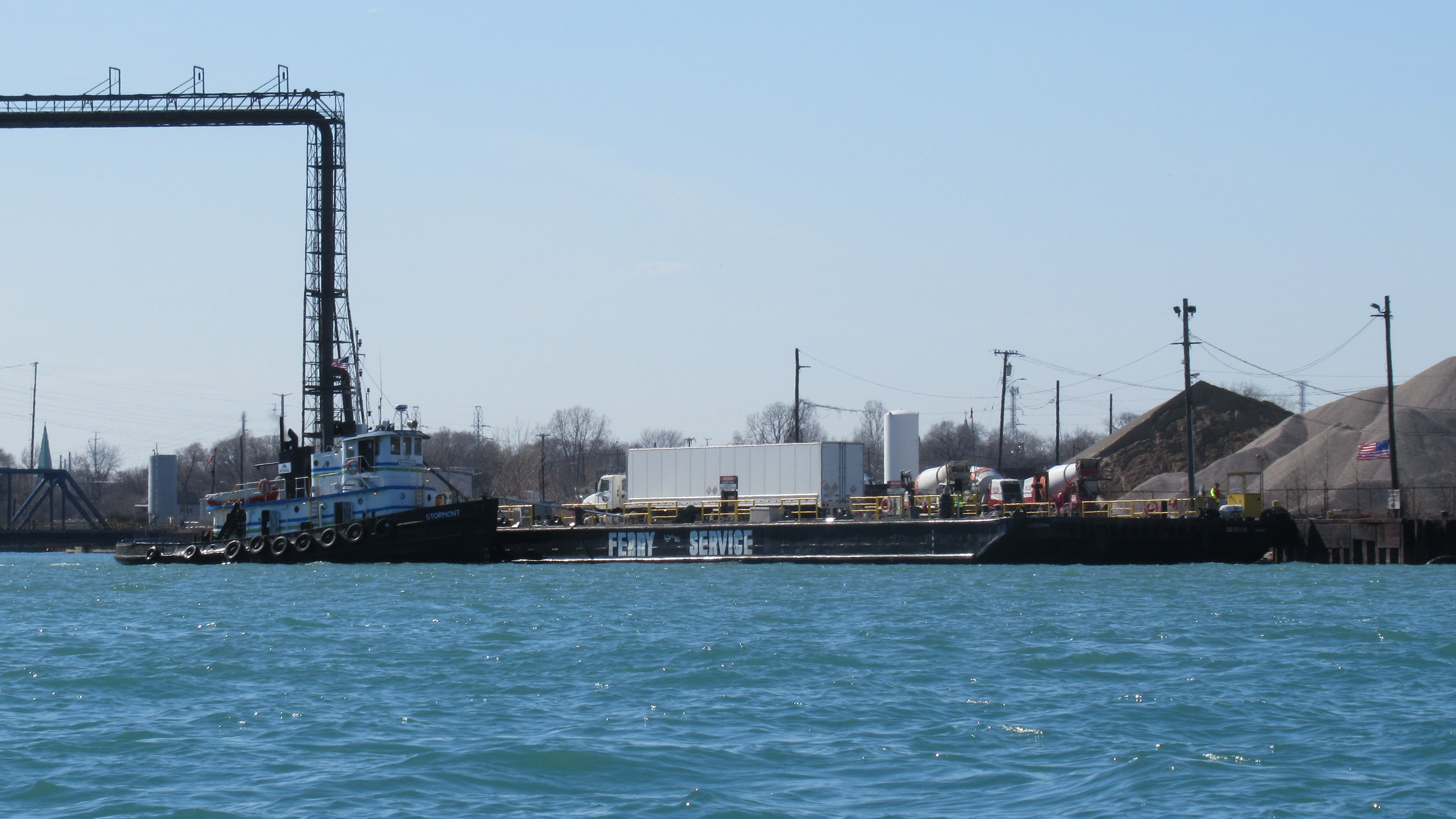
The MV Stormont arriving at the Detroit dock with a truck aboard.

The service was run with a flat open non-self-propelled barge with a pilot house located on one end, towed by the MV Stormont, a diesel harbor tow tug. It made 5 trips daily; a one-way crossing took 20 minutes. The Detroit port was located in Delray, Southwest Detroit, near Zug Island at the mouth of the River Rouge; the Windsor port was located near the Windsor Salt Mine, accessed from the Ojibway Parkway. Customs clearance was required before embarking onto the ferry at either port.
