= Calcination =

Manufacturing process

Calcination is thermal treatment of a solid chemical compound (e.g. mixed carbonate ores) whereby the compound is raised to high temperature without melting with a restricted supply of oxygen (i.e. gaseous O_{2} fraction of air), generally for the purpose of removing impurities or volatile substances and/or to induce thermal decomposition.

The root of the word calcination refers to its most prominent use, which is to remove carbon and oxygen from limestone (calcium carbonate) through applying heat to yield calcium oxide (quicklime). This calcination reaction (which is endothermic) is CaCO_{3}(s) → CaO(s) + CO_{2}(g).

Calcium oxide is a crucial ingredient in modern cement, and is also used as a chemical flux in smelting. Industrial calcination generally emits carbon dioxide (CO_{2}).

A calciner is a steel cylinder that rotates inside a heated furnace and performs indirect high-temperature processing (550–1150 °C, or 1000–2100 °F) within a controlled atmosphere.

== Etymology ==
The process of calcination derives its name from the Latin calcinare 'to burn lime' due to its most common application, the decomposition of calcium carbonate (limestone) to calcium oxide (lime) and carbon dioxide, in order to create cement. The product of calcination is usually referred to in general as "calcine", regardless of the actual minerals undergoing thermal treatment.

== Industrial processes ==
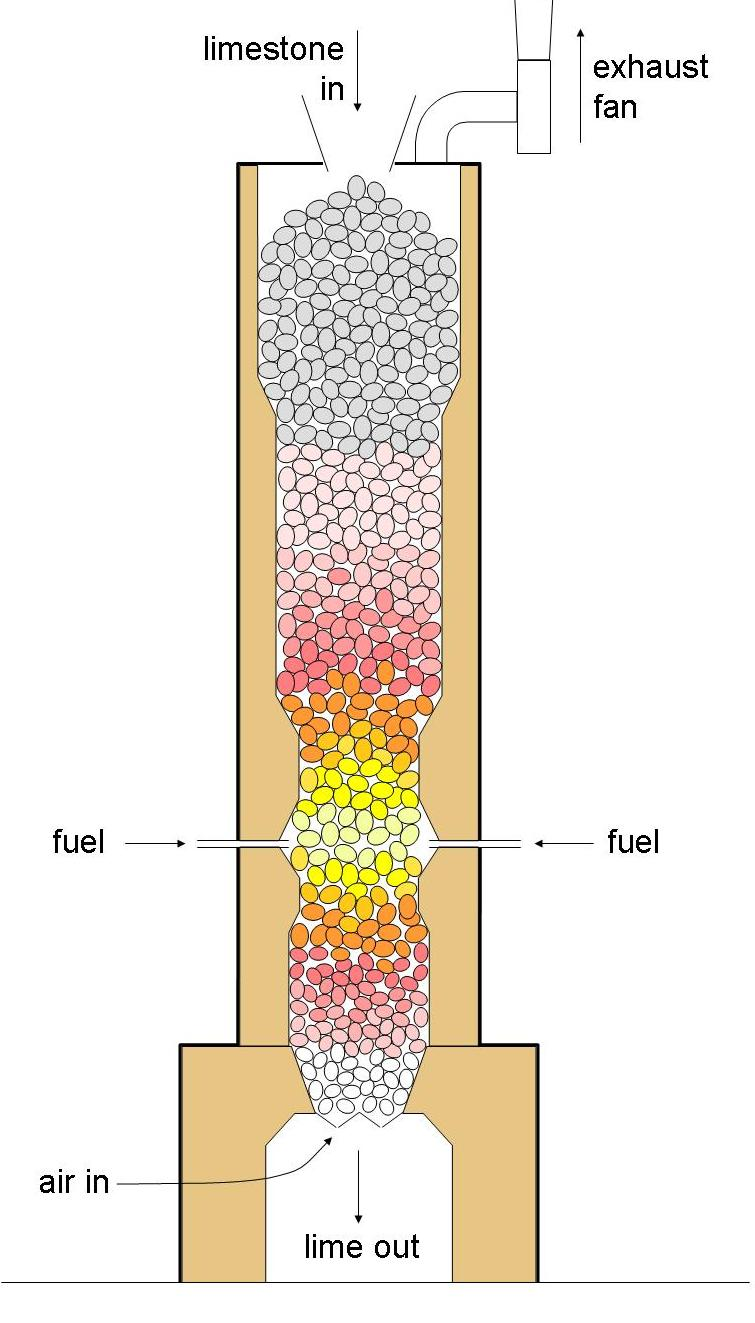
An oven for calcination of limestone

Calcination is carried out in furnaces or reactors (sometimes referred to as kilns or calciners) of various designs including shaft furnaces, rotary kilns, multiple hearth furnaces, and fluidized bed reactors.

Examples of calcination processes include the following:

- decomposition of carbonate ores, as in the calcination of limestone to drive off carbon dioxide;
- decomposition of hydrated minerals, as in the calcination of bauxite and gypsum, carbonate ore to remove water of crystallization as water vapor;
- decomposition of volatile matter contained in raw petroleum coke;
- heat treatment to effect phase transformations, as in conversion of anatase to rutile or devitrification of glass materials;
- removal of ammonium ions in the synthesis of zeolites;
- defluorination of uranyl fluoride to create uranium dioxide and hydrofluoric acid gas;
- heat treatment of anthracite through electrically fired calcining furnace or gas calcination which results in development of graphitic structure.

== Reactions ==
Calcination reactions usually take place at or above the thermal decomposition temperature (for decomposition and volatilization reactions) or the transition temperature (for phase transitions). This temperature is usually defined as the temperature at which the standard Gibbs free energy for a particular calcination reaction is equal to zero.

=== Limestone calcination ===
In limestone calcination, a decomposition process that occurs at 900 to 1,050 °C (1,650 to 1,920 °F), the chemical reaction is

CaCO_{3}(s) → CaO(s) + CO_{2}(g)

The standard Gibbs free energy of reaction in [J/mol] is approximated as ΔG°_{r} ≈ 177,100 J/mol − 158 J/(mol*K) * T. The standard free energy of reaction is 0 in this case when the temperature, T, is equal to 1121 K, or 848 °C (1,558 °F).

=== Oxidation ===
In some cases, calcination of a metal results in oxidation of the metal to produce a metal oxide. In his essay "Formal response to the question, why Tin and Lead increase in weight when they are calcined" (1630), Jean Rey notes that "having placed two pounds six ounces of fine English tin in an iron vessel and heated it strongly on an open furnace for the space of six hours with continual agitation and without adding anything to it, he recovered two pounds thirteen ounces of a white calx". He claimed "That this increase in weight comes from the air, which in the vessel has been rendered denser, heavier, and in some measure adhesive, by the vehement and long-continued heat of the furnace: which air mixes with the calx (frequent agitation aiding) and becomes attached to its most minute particles: not otherwise than water makes heavier sand which you throw into it and agitate, by moistening it and adhering to the smallest of its grains", presumably the metal gained weight as it was being oxidized.

At room temperature, tin is quite resistant to the impact of air or water, as a thin oxide film forms on the surface of the metal. In air, tin starts to oxidize at a temperature of over 150 °C (302 °F): Sn + O_{2} → SnO_{2}.

Antoine Lavoisier explored this experiment with similar results time later.

== Alchemy ==
In alchemy, calcination was believed to be one of the 12 vital processes required for the transformation of a substance.

Alchemists distinguished two kinds of calcination, actual and potential. Actual calcination is that brought about by actual fire, from wood, coals, or other fuel, raised to a certain temperature. Potential calcination is that brought about by potential fire, such as corrosive chemicals; for example, gold was calcined in a reverberatory furnace with mercury and salammoniac; silver with common salt and alkali salt; copper with salt and sulfur; iron with salammoniac and vinegar; tin with antimony; lead with sulfur; and mercury with nitric acid.

There was also philosophical calcination, which was said to occur when horns, hooves, etc., were hung over boiling water, or other liquor, until they had lost their mucilage, and were easily reducible into powder.

According to the obsolete phlogiston theory, the 'calx' was the true elemental substance that was left after phlogiston was driven out of it in the process of combustion.
