= River Canard, Ontario =

Coordinates: 42°11′18″N 83°05′33″W

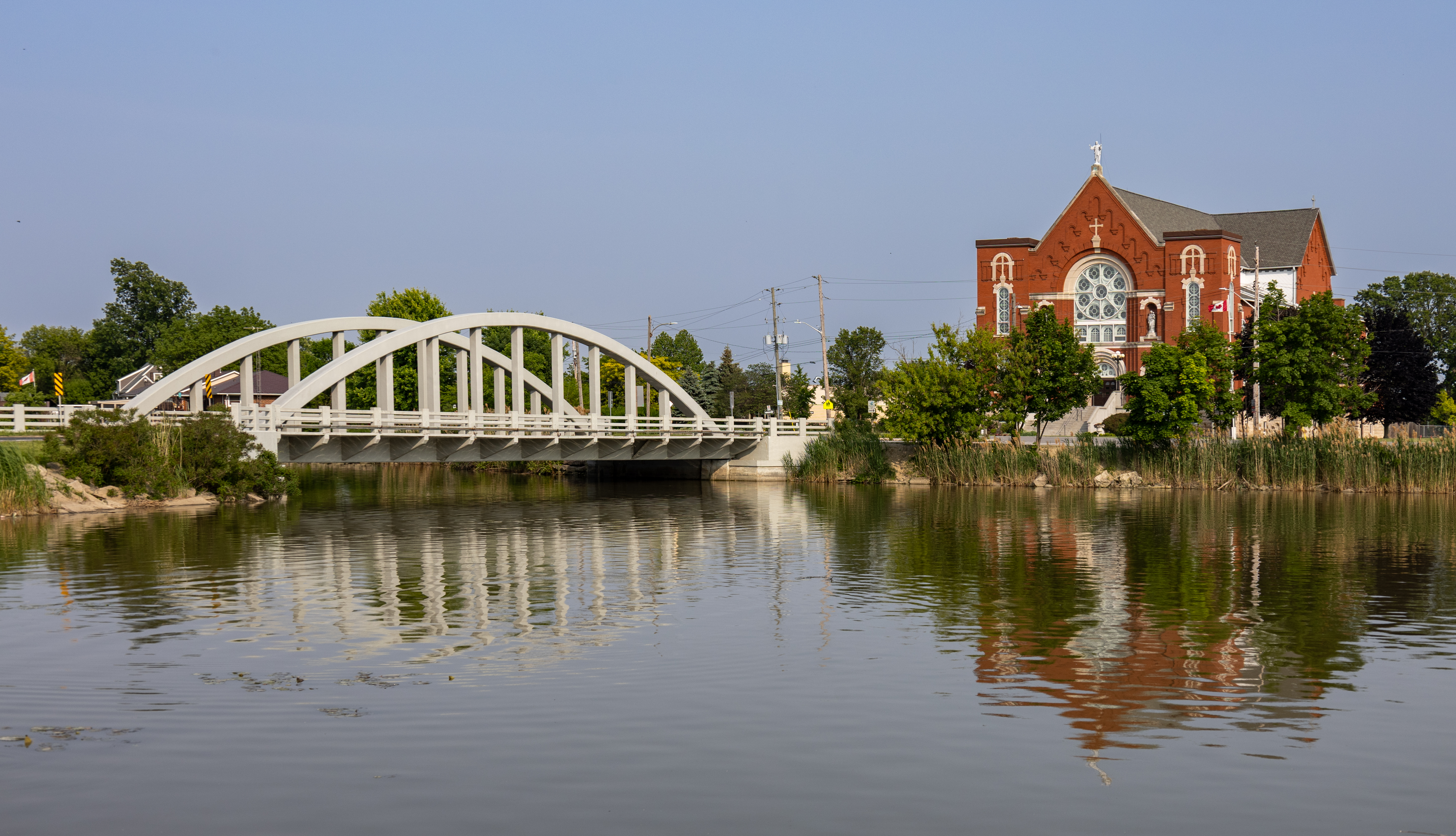
The River Canard Bridge and St. Joseph's Church, as viewed across the Canard River

River Canard is a hamlet of roughly 500 people in the northern part of Amherstburg, Ontario and the southern part of Lasalle, Ontario, Canada. It is located on the Canard River and is approximately 12 miles south of Windsor, Ontario. It is home to St. Joseph's Church, an attractive French-Canadian church similar to St. Joachim Church in Lakeshore (now closed), and Ste. Anne's Church in Tecumseh. The town has a bowstring arch bridge that carries Essex County Road 8 over the Canard River, a tributary of the Detroit River.

Originally named Rivière-aux-Canards ("Duck River") after the river, the community residents include descendants of the French-speaking inhabitants who originally settled the Detroit River region; they came from France and Quebec in the 18th century. Later French-speaking migrants came in the 19th century from Quebec. St. Joseph's parish still celebrates the mass in French. Replacing earlier structures, St. Joseph Church was built in 1915; it was renovated in 2015 at a cost exceeding $1.6 million, raised in large part by its parishioners.

The main sub-division in River Canard is built on property formerly owned by Thomas J. Beneteau and his son, Bernard. Thomas and Bernard were farmers who grew corn and peas for the Green Giant label. The farm was sold to developer Carl Lamp. The main road through the subdivision is called Beneteau Drive after that family. Lamp named the side streets "David," "Lydia," and "Ryan," presumably for members of his own family. As part of the development agreement, a street called Alta B crescent was so named to honour the 5 children of Thomas and Pearl Beneteau: Agnes, Leona, Theresa, Annette, and Bernard (Bernie). The subdivision abuts the picturesque St. Joseph Church property with its companion St. Joseph elementary school.

On most maps, River Canard is shown at the junction of Essex County Roads 3 and 20 (Former Kings Highway 18), which were constructed much later.

== Battle of River Canard ==
River Canard was the site of the Battle of River Canard between British and American forces on July 16, 1812, during the early days of the War of 1812. An American force of 280 men under colonels Cass and Miller skirmished with British troops near the bridge. Two British soldiers, James Hancock and John Dean, were captured by the Americans. Hancock died of his wounds later in the day, becoming the first British casualty of the war. Dean was taken prisoner to Detroit, where doctors amputated his left arm because it was severely wounded. He was liberated one month later, after the British took over Fort Detroit. An Ontario historical plaque marks the site of the battle and tells of the British casualties.

== History ==
River Canard is one of the oldest European settlements in North America, as it was part of early French colonial settlement in the 18th century related to Fort Detroit and the Detroit River. Their descendants, known as Fort Detroit French, still live in the area. They were joined in southwestern Ontario by more numerous French-speaking migrants, known as Canadian French, who came to the area in the 19th century, primarily from Quebec. The ethnic French largely formed two communities in Ontario because of their different histories, but they would sometimes collaborate of issues of joint importance, such as French instruction in schools and French language in churches with French-speaking congregations.

In 1912 the government of Ontario issued Regulation 17, to end the operation of bilingual schools and reduce instruction in French. It was supported by Bishop Michael Francis Fallon of London, Ontario, who argued with priests and parishioners and supported converting Catholic schools and services to English only. In 1910 he had replaced the bilingual Holy Names Sisters with the English-speaking Ursulines at a Windsor school. In 1917, prior to the government issuing Regulation 17, the Ursulines dropped French instruction from three Windsor separate schools (operated by Catholics). French-speaking parents were very upset. Dissension lasted for more than a decade, and was part of what has been a continuing struggle by ethnic and nationalist French in Canada to preserve their language use and its status.
