= Ypsilanti Water Tower =

Historic water tower in Ypsilanti, Michigan

- Ypsilanti Water Works Stand Pipe
- U.S. National Register of Historic Places
- Michigan State Historic Site
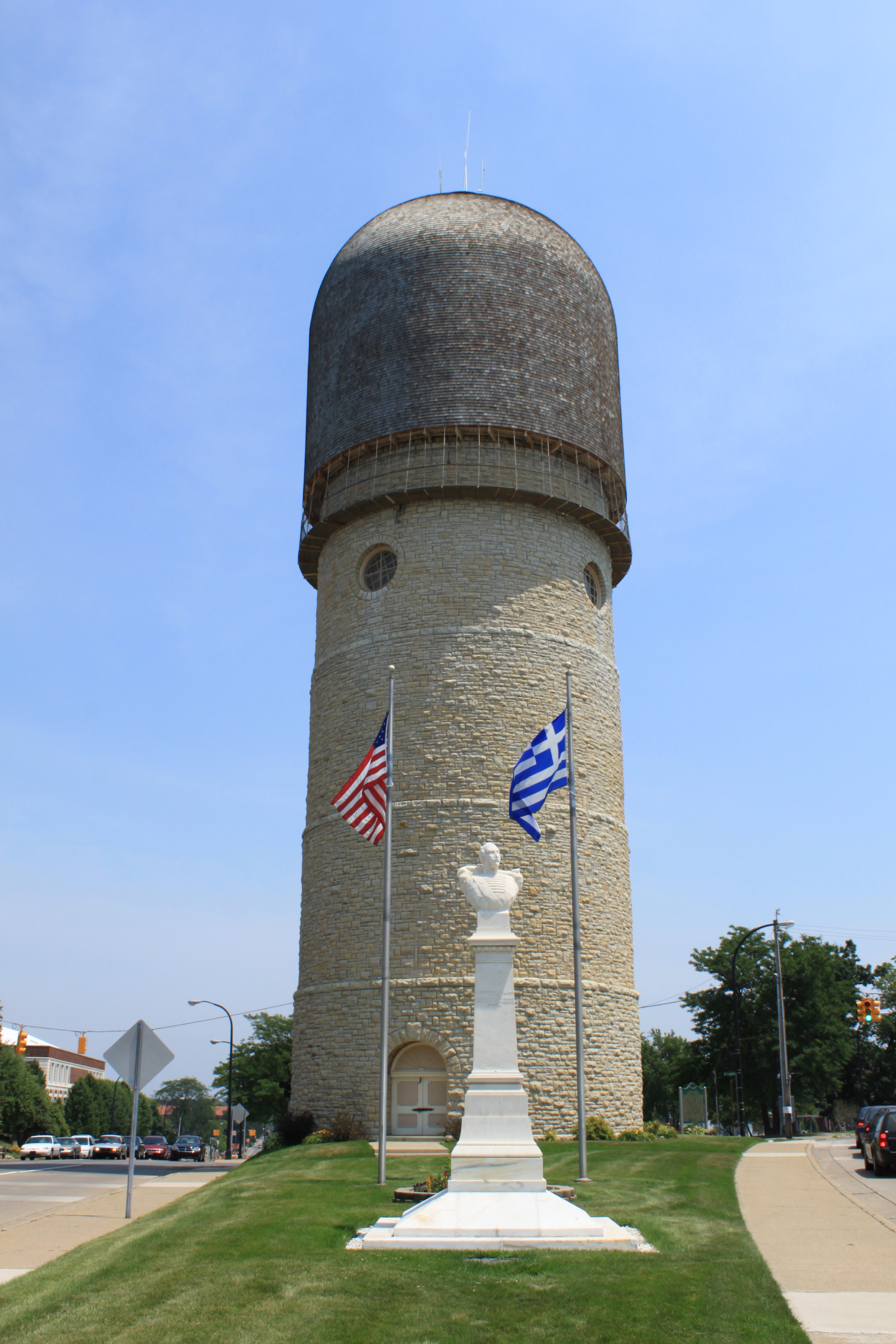
- Ypsilanti Water Tower

- Location within Michigan Location within the United States
- Interactive map
- Location: Ypsilanti, Michigan
- Coordinates: 42°14′44″N 83°37′29″W
- Built: 1890
- Architect: William R. Coats
- NRHP reference No.: 81000318
- Added to NRHP: October 26, 1981

The Ypsilanti Water Tower is a historic water tower in Ypsilanti, Michigan, United States.

The tower was designed by William R. Coats and built as part of an elaborate city waterworks project that began in 1889. Located on the highest point in Ypsilanti, the tower was built in 1890 at a cost of $21,435.63 (equivalent to $680,948 in 2024). It has become a well-known landmark in Ypsilanti, and due to the building's shape and location, the tower is frequently used by residents as a point for providing directions for visitors and residents.

== History ==
An ordinance passed on April 14, 1898, established a yearly rate schedule for residences with running water. Rates were based on the number of faucets in use, the type of business that customers operated and the livestock they owned. A residence with one tap was charged $5 and a private bathtub cost an additional $2. Saloon keepers paid $7 for one faucet, $3 for each additional faucet and $1 for each billiard table. Each cow a person owned cost $1. People who failed to pay their bill were subject to a $50 fine and 90 days in the county jail.

During the construction, hoping to protect themselves from injury, the builders made at least four crosses in the stonework, one over the west door, an elaborate but difficult to find Greek Cross on the east side and two inside the water tower. It was completed on February 3, 1890, at the cost of $21,368.

The structure was the only water tower in the Ypsilanti water system until 1956. The Ypsilanti Community Utilities Authority began operating and maintaining the structure in 1974. That same year the tower was designated by the American Water Works Association as an American Water Landmark. It was also designated a Historic Civil Engineering Landmark by the Michigan Section of the American Society of Civil Engineers. In 1976 it was restored.

== Structure ==
The exterior was designed in the popular Queen Anne style of the period. Queen Anne design was less formal than other popular styles at the time; instead it experimented with different shapes particularly towers. Queen Anne buildings also often had more decoration than this structure.

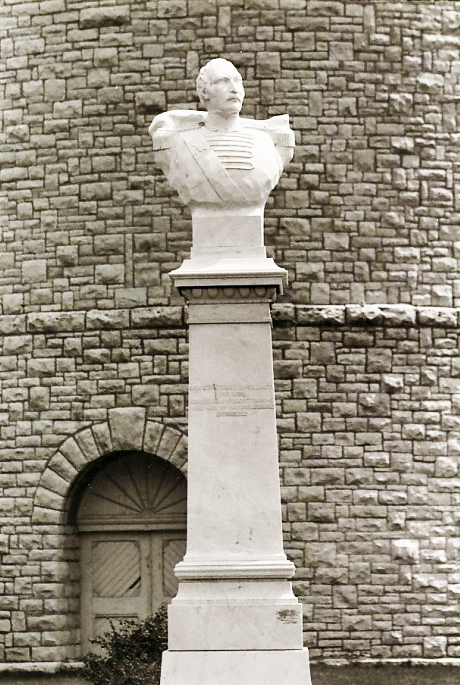
Bust of Demetrius Ypsilanti. Note cross in stonework over the entrance.

The stone tower is located at the highest point of elevation of the city on Summit Street. The tower is made of Joliet limestone. The tower is 147 feet (45 m) tall, has an 85-foot (26 m) base. The substructure walls taper from a thickness of 40 inches (100 cm) at the bottom to 24 inches (61 cm) at the top. The reservoir holds a 250,000-US-gallon (950,000 L) steel tank. When it was erected it had a dual purpose. Not only did it store water but the falling water also generated electricity for the city street lamps at night.

A marble bust of Demetrios Ypsilantis stands between a Greek and a U.S. flag at the base of the water tower. The city of Ypsilanti is named after this hero of the Greek War of Independence.

== Present day ==
The phallic shape of the Ypsilanti Water Tower long been a source of humor in Ann Arbor and Ypsilanti, where it is nicknamed "the Brick Dick". The tower was ranked as the World's Most Phallic Building by Cabinet Magazine in 2003. An urban legend holds that the tower will crumble if a virgin graduates from nearby Eastern Michigan University.

== See also ==
- List of towers
- American Water Landmark
