= Battle of River Canard =

Battle in the War of 1812

Coordinates: 42°11′18″N 83°05′33″W

- Part of the War of 1812
- Map of 1812 battles in the Detroit region.
Date	July 16, 1812
Location	River Canard
Result	American victory

Belligerents
United States	Great Britain

Commanders and leaders
Colonel Lewis Cass; Lieutenant Colonel James Miller	

Units involved
4th U.S. Infantry; Ohio Militia	41st Regiment of Foot; Menominee

Strength
280	Unknown

Casualties and losses
None	1 killed 1 wounded prisoner

The Battle of River Canard (French Bataille de Rivière aux Canards) was an engagement between British and American forces on July 16, 1812, during the War of 1812. Although it is called the "Battle" of River Canard, it should be thought of as a series of skirmishes. The battle was the first engagement on Canadian soil after war between Britain and the United States was declared on June 18.

On July 12, 1812, Brigadier General William Hull crossed the Detroit River and occupied the village of Sandwich in Upper Canada, 16 miles (26 km) upriver of the British naval base and fort at Amherstburg. On July 16, Hull ordered 280 men under Colonel Lewis Cass and Lieutenant Colonel James Miller to reconnoitre south 12 miles (19 km) to the bridge over the Canard River.

The bridge over the Canard River was held by a small detachment of the 41st Regiment of Foot supported by a group of Menominee that had arrived at Amherstburg days earlier. Cass decided to ford the river upstream of the bridge and attack the enemy's flank while Miller would keep the British at the bridge pinned down by steady fire. The British, however, recognized the danger and pulled back from the bridge, leaving two soldiers, James Hancock and John Dean to form a rearguard. Despite putting up a fierce resistance, both men were wounded and captured. Hancock died of his wounds several hours later. Dean's arm was amputated and he remained a prisoner until Hull surrendered Detroit to Major General Isaac Brock a month later. Brock commended the actions of both Hancock and Dean upon his arrival at Amherstburg in early August.

According to Robert Lucas, who served under Cass in the Ohio Militia, the recently deceased Hancock was scalped by "Indians" who tried to sell their trophy to British officials.

Although the Americans now held the bridge, Hull decided that he was not yet ready to move against Amherstburg and advised Cass and Miller to withdraw back to Sandwich. The British quickly reoccupied and reinforced the position, partially demolished the bridge, and moved a gunboat and the 20-gun Queen Charlotte into the river. Brief skirmishes along the river continued for several days.
