= Multiple hearth furnace =

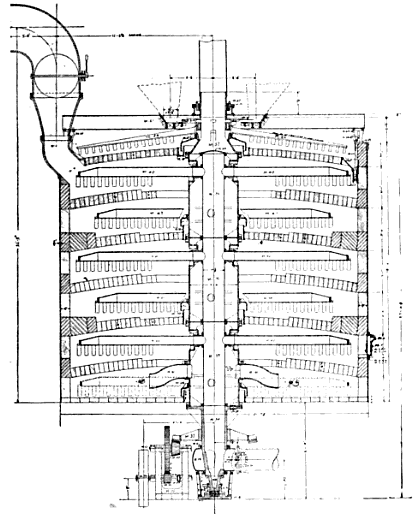
A sketch of a Herreshoff multiple-hearth furnace

A multiple hearth furnace also known as a vertical calciner, is used for continuous preparation and calcining of materials.

== Working ==
The multiple hearth furnaces consist of several circular hearths or kilns superimposed on each other. Material is fed from the top and is moved by the action of rotating "rabble arms", and the revolving mechanical rabbles attached to the arms move over the surface of each hearth to continuously shift the ore. The arms are attached to a rotating central shaft that passes through the center of the roaster. As the material is moved, the ore that is charged at the top hearth gradually moves downward as it passes through windows in the floor of each hearth or through alternate passages around the shaft and the periphery until it finally emerges at the bottom.

== Gas ==
The oxidizing gases flow upward, i.e., counter-current to the descending charge. In a well-insulated roaster, external heating is unnecessary except when the charge is highly moist. The hearth at the top of the roaster dries and heats the charge. Ignition and oxidation of the charge occur lower down.

== Variables ==
The hearths may be individually heated and the number, temperature, rotation rate, and size of each hearth determine the residence time and conditions for the calcining powder in order to achieve the desired final properties.

== Structure of furnace ==
The individual hearths are lined with refractory brick, and the rabble arms are typically a force-cooled metal alloy. The entire structure is enclosed in a cylindrical brick-lined steel shell.
