= Water Board Building (Detroit, Michigan) =

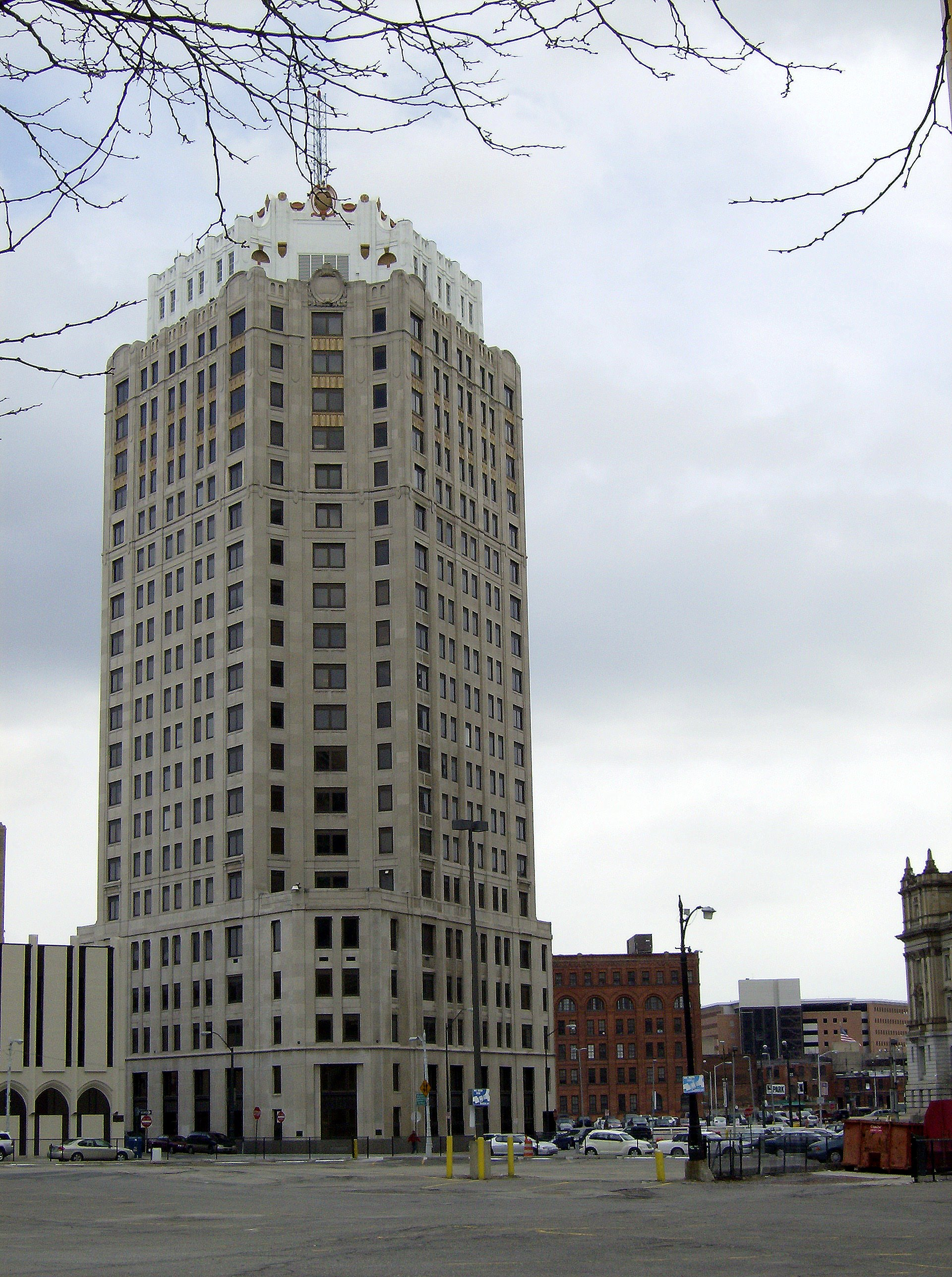

General information
- Type: Office
- Architectural style: Art Deco
- Location: 735 Randolph Street; Detroit, Michigan
- Coordinates: 42.3327°N 83.0441°W
- Completed: 1928

Height
- Roof: 259 ft (79 m)

Technical details
- Floor count: 23

Design and construction
- Architect(s): Louis Kamper

The Water Board Building is a high-rise office building located at 735 Randolph Street in downtown Detroit, Michigan. It was constructed in 1928 and stands at 23 stories tall. It was designed by Louis Kamper in the Art Deco architectural style, and its materials include granite, limestone, marble, and terra cotta.

== History and description ==
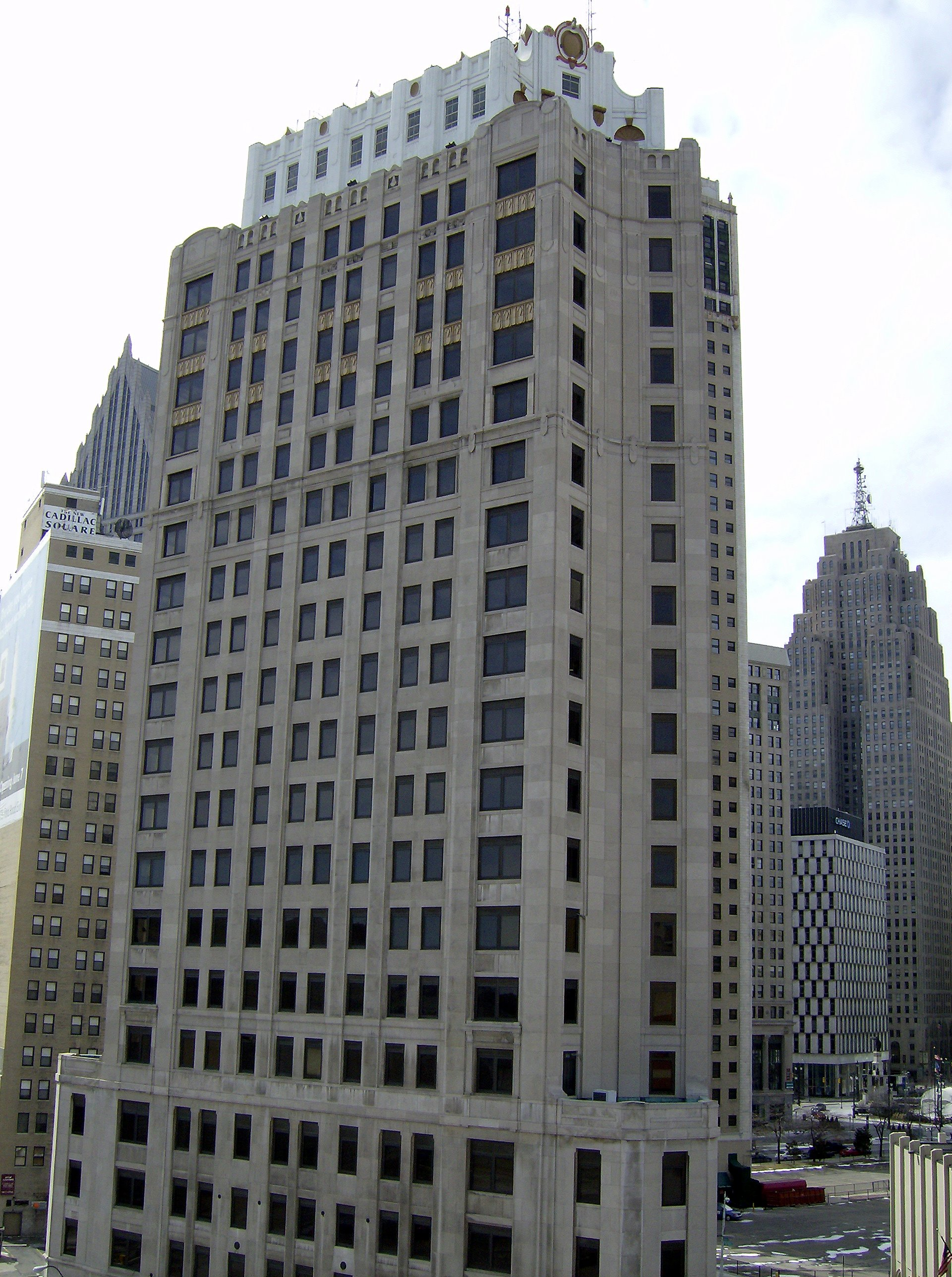
Water Board Building

The Water Board Building is triangular in shape, for its triangle-shaped plot of land, occupying the entire block formed by Randolph, Farmer, and Bates Streets. The building's site was originally part of East Grand Circus Park as designated in 1806. The site was rezoned in 1886, when part of the land became home to the Metropolitan Police Commission.

The building is composed of a five-story base topped by 15 more floors of office space, and crowned with a three-story penthouse. It was originally planned to be only 14 floors in height, but because of the high land value of the site, the height was increased. The building was completed in seven months by a young A.Z. Shmina for A.W. Kutsche & Co.; upon its completion, the Water Commission only occupied the first eight floors of the building, with the other city departments filling up the remaining floors. The Water Board Commission became the sole tenant in the 1990s.

The exterior of the penthouse is actually painted terra cotta, with the rest of the building is faced in Bedford limestone. The base also includes marble and bands of pink and grey granite. Louis Grell (1887–1960) painted a large Neptune and Detroit history mural on the ceiling in the grand lobby, and other murals in the board room are by Grell.
