= Ypsilanti High School =

Location
- 2095 Packard Road; Ypsilanti, Michigan 48197; United States; 42°14′40″N 83°38′44″W

Information
- School type: Public school (government funded), Secondary
- Motto: Home of the Ypsilanti Grizzlies
- Established: 1849
- Closed: 2013
- School district: Ypsilanti Public School District
- Grades: 9–12
- Colors: Purple and Gold
- Mascot: Phoenix (formerly the Braves)
- Website: http://www.ypsd.org/schools/ypsihigh/index.html

Ypsilanti High School (YHS), commonly known as Ypsi High, was a public school located in Ypsilanti Township, Michigan. A comprehensive high school serving 9–12th grades, it was located on the western edge of the Ypsilanti Public School District at the corner of Packard and Hewitt Roads.

When the Willow Run and Ypsilanti school districts merged to become Ypsilanti Community Schools in 2013, YHS's current campus became the newly merged district's high school: Ypsilanti Community High School.

== History ==
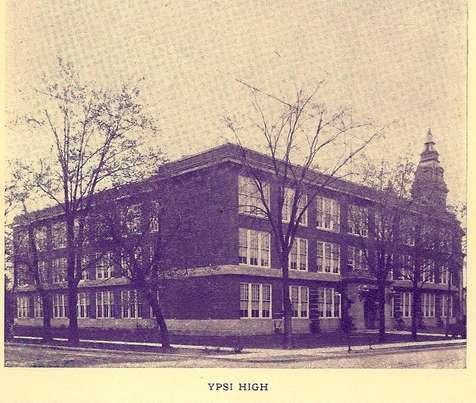
Ypsilanti High School c. 1922

Until 1973, Ypsilanti High School was housed in a historic 3-story brick building on Cross Street, which has since been converted into senior citizen housing units.

== Notable alumni ==
- Mike Bass – professional NFL football player who played defensive back for the Detroit Lions (1967) and the Washington Redskins (1969–1975)
- Amy Devers, designer and television personality (Freeform Furniture, Trading Spaces, Designer People)
- Ron Fernandes, American football player
- Rodney Holman – professional NFL football player who played tight end for the Cincinnati Bengals (1982–1992), and the Detroit Lions (1993–1995)
- Jaylen Johnson (born 1996), basketball player for Hapoel Haifa of the Israeli Basketball Premier League
- Carolyn King – one of the first girls to play Little League Baseball; she was the centerpiece of a landmark lawsuit in 1973 that led to Little League dropping its boys-only policy
- Jason Lamar – professional football player
- Alfred Lucking – lawyer and Congressman from Michigan, who later became general counsel for the Ford Motor Company and the Henry Ford interests
- William McAndrew, educator who served as superintendent of Chicago Public Schools
- Charles Ramsey – former Eastern Michigan Eagles men's basketball head coach; he played on the YHS baseball, basketball and football teams
- Don Schwall, former MLB player (Boston Red Sox, Pittsburgh Pirates, Atlanta Braves)
- Shara Worden, lead singer and songwriter for My Brightest Diamond

== Notable faculty ==
- Byron M. Cutcheon – former YHS teacher and principal who later became an American Civil War general, Medal of Honor recipient, lawyer and Congressman from Michigan. He became principal of YHS (where he taught ancient languages, higher mathematics and mental and moral philosophy) in 1861, just before he graduated from the University of Michigan

== Braves logo controversy ==
The mascot of Ypsilanti High School has been a source of controversy. In the early 1990s, in response to charges that the mascot was offensive to Native Americans, the first changes were undertaken. The real-life mascot, who dressed up as a stereotypical 'Indian' (complete with mohawk) for football games, was discontinued and a panel for the improvement of Native American cultural education was set up.

Braves logo

In 2004, the school's mascot came under fire again, with opponents of the name being organized by an Eastern Michigan University professor. The School Board set up a committee in the fall of 2005 to look into the issue. After a series of open public meetings, the committee returned a report concluding that, due to systemic discrimination, the mascot must indeed be changed. However, the committee was the subject of questions itself, with allegations that the group splintered, and none of the public forums gathered much student input. The School Board, while going over the committee's report, scheduled a final public meeting to be held in April 2006. Garnering a large turnout, the event was held in the school's auditorium, with support for the name generally coming from the student body and the community and opponents coming from academia and the Native American community. Following this meeting, the School Board decided in a in May 2006 compromise decision that the name "Braves" could still be used but the Braves logo could not be used in any athletic activities or school events.

In the Fall of 2006, after a reshuffling of School Board members following an election the previous spring, the issue was brought up yet again. In another contentious and closely divided decision, the Board chose 4-3 to retire the 'Braves' name completely on December 11, 2006. On November 27, 2007, the school board chose Phoenix as the new school mascot, and on March 31, 2008, the new logo was unveiled.
