= Charles Ramsey (basketball) =

American basketball coach

Current position
- Title: Head coach

Biographical details
- Born: March 25, 1961 (age 65); Ypsilanti, Michigan, U.S.

Playing career
- 1979–1981: Fisk

Coaching career (HC unless noted)
- 1990–1993: Eastern Michigan (asst.)
- 1993–1994: Tennessee State (asst.)
- 1994–1996: Drake (asst.)
- 1996–2001: California (asst.)
- 2001–2005: Michigan (asst.)
- 2005–2011: Eastern Michigan

Head coaching record
- Overall: 68-118 (.366)

Charles Edward Ramsey (born March 25, 1961) is an American athlete and college basketball coach. He is the former head men's basketball coach at Eastern Michigan University.

== Early life ==
Ramsey was born in Ypsilanti, Michigan and graduated from Ypsilanti High School in 1979, where he played on the baseball, basketball and football teams. He played collegiately for Fisk University from 1979 to 1981, and was named All-American. In 1992, Ramsey graduated from Eastern Michigan University.

Ramsey was inducted into the Ypsilanti High School Athletic Hall of Fame where he was a 3 sport athlete in Football, Basketball, and Baseball. He was a member of Kappa Alpha Psi fraternity, initiated at Delta Nu chapter.

== Career ==
He has been an assistant basketball coach at the University of California, Drake University, Tennessee State and the University of Michigan.

He accepted the head coaching position at his alma mater, Eastern Michigan, in 2005. He served as head coach until 2011. Ramsey's 68 career wins (after the 2011 season) put him 5th on the all-time career win list for EMU coaches. Ben Braun tops the list with 185 wins followed by Elton Rynearson with 160.

Ramsey was inducted into the Ypsilanti High School Hall of Fame in 2008, and is a member of the National Association of Basketball Coaches.

== Family life ==
Ramsey and his wife Allison (deceased) have two sons, Charles (Tre’) and Chandler. They live in Ypsilanti. Was remarried to Janel N Ramsey 1/1/19, a son Jaden and daughter Ciara.

== Head coaching record ==
Record table
Season	Team	Overall	Conference	Standing	Postseason
Eastern Michigan (Mid-American Conference) (2005–2011)
2005–06	Eastern Michigan	7–21	3–15	5th (West)	
2006–07	Eastern Michigan	13–19	6–10	4th (West)	
2007–08	Eastern Michigan	14–17	8–8	T–2nd (West)	
2008–09	Eastern Michigan	8–24	6–10	4th (West)	
2009–10	Eastern Michigan	17–15	8–8	T–2nd (West)	
2010–11	Eastern Michigan	9–22	5–11	T–4th (West)	
Total:		68–118			
National champion Postseason invitational champion Conference regular season champion Conference regular season and conference tournament champion Division regular season champion Division regular season and conference tournament champion Conference tournament champion
