= Fred Jackson (American football coach) =

American football player and coach (born 1950)

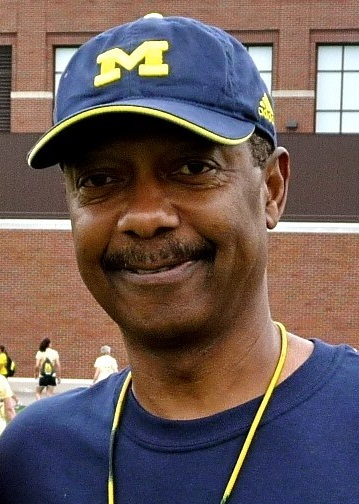
- Jackson with the Michigan Wolverines in 2011

Current position
- Title: Assistant running backs coach
- Team: Michigan
- Conference: Big Ten

Biographical details
- Born: June 9, 1950 (age 76); Baton Rouge, Louisiana, U.S.
- Education: Jackson State (1972); Michigan (1975); Eastern Michigan (1976)

Playing career
- 1968–1970 or 1971: Jackson State
- 1972–1975: Flint Sabres
- Positions: Quarterback, cornerback

Coaching career (HC unless noted)
- 1971–1977: Flint Southwestern HS (MI) (assistant)
- 1978–1979: Flint Southwestern HS (MI)
- 1980–1981: Toledo (WR/TE)
- 1982: Toledo (OC)
- 1983–1985: Wisconsin (WR)
- 1986: Wisconsin ("lead coach" offense)
- 1987: Navy (WR)
- 1988: South Carolina (QB/WR)
- 1989: Purdue (QB)
- 1990: Purdue (OC/QB)
- 1991: Vanderbilt (QB)
- 1992–1994: Michigan (RB)
- 1995–1996: Michigan (OC/RB)
- 1997–2002: Michigan (asst. HC / RB)
- 2003–2007: Michigan (assoc. HC / RB)
- 2008–2014: Michigan (RB)
- 2016–2017: Ypsilanti Community HS (MI)
- 2022–2025: Michigan (analyst/RB)
- 2026–present: Michigan (asst. RB)

Accomplishments and honors

Awards
- AFCA Assistant Coach of the Year (2001)

Fred Jackson (born June 9, 1950) is an American college football coach and former player. He is currently the assistant running backs coach for the University of Michigan. He has worked with Michigan Wolverines running backs for 28 years, from 2022 to the present and from 1992 to 2014. He was also the offensive coordinator in 1995 and 1996, assistant head coach from 1997 to 2002, and associate head coach from 2003 to 2007. Jackson was on Michigan's staff when the team won national championships in 1997 and 2023.

Jackson played college football at Jackson State. He has also held coaching positions at Flint Southwestern High School from 1971 to 1979, University of Toledo from 1980 to 1982, University of Wisconsin from 1983 to 1986, United States Naval Academy in 1987, University of South Carolina in 1988, Purdue University in 1989 and 1990, Vanderbilt University in 1991, and Ypsilanti Community High School in 2016 and 2017.

== Early life ==
Jackson was born on June 9, 1950, in Baton Rouge, Louisiana. He was a quarterback at Scotlandville High School in the Scotlandville section of Baton Rouge. Although contemporaneous sources do not support the claim, a 1983 article in the Wisconsin State Journal claimed that Jackson was an all-state quarterback in both 1965 and 1966.

Although no contemporaneous accounts of the award have been found, Jackson claimed in a 1988 interview that he was named Louisiana's prep athlete of the year, the first black athlete to be so honored, at a 1967 banquet in Baton Rouge. According to Jackson, Alabama coach Bear Bryant approached him at the banquet and said, "Son, if things were different, I'd recruit you as my quarterback." Another article written in 2024 by Jackson's brother-in-law, a sports columnist for The Patriot-News of Harrisburg, Pennsylvania and former Football Writers Association of America president, claimed that he "was such a terrific high school quarterback in the mid-’60s that he found himself at a state awards banquet in Baton Rouge in 1968".

== College career ==
=== Jackson State ===
Jackson played college football for the Jackson State Tigers in Jackson, Mississippi, from 1968 to 1970 or 1971. He was recruited and played under head coach Rod Paige as a freshman. Jackson continued under head coach Ulysses S. McPherson when Paige stepped down as head coach after the 1968 season.

==== 1968 and 1969 seasons ====
In September 1968, The Clarion-Ledger reported that Jackson was a sophomore competing for playing time at the quarterback position. No contemporaneous coverage has been found of Jackson appearing in any games for the 1968 or 1969 Jackson State Tigers football team.

==== 1970 season ====
In 1970, Sylvester Collins was Jackson State's starting quarterback, though there are contemporaneous articles that report Jackson also saw playing time at the position. In an October 1970 loss to Bishop, Jackson threw a 66-yard touchdown pass. Jackson also saw late-game action against Grambling in October 1970, completing one of two passes as a substitute for Collins. In his backup role, Jackson earned a reputation in 1970 as "a good passer".

==== Disputed 1971 season ====
Many non-contemporaneous sources, including a 1972 The Flint Journal article, assert that Jackson also played for the 1971 Jackson State team. The 1972 Flint Journal article also claimed that Jackson was "the regular quarterback for four years at Jackson State" and that he completed 26 touchdown passes for the 1971 Jackson State team. An earlier Flint Journal article claimed that he threw 21 touchdown passes for the 1970 Jackson State team. Other non-contemporaneous sources claim that Jackson was teammates with Walter Payton who was a true freshman on the 1971 team, did not graduate from Jackson State until 1972, and received All-Southwestern Athletic Conference (SWAC) honors and/or led the conference in passing as a senior. One source claimed that Jackson won all-conference honors in three seasons and that the team lost only three games in those three seasons.

However, the foregoing claims are contradicted by contemporaneous sources, including the following:

1. Multiple accounts from The Flint Journal reported during the 1971 season that Jackson was an assistant coach at Flint Southwestern High School in Flint, Michigan, 980 miles north of Jackson State.
2. No contemporaneous sources have been found to corroborate claims that Jackson played for the 1971 Jackson State team. To the contrary, none of the game accounts from the 1971 season in the Jackson, Mississippi, newspaper refer to Jackson being part of the team and instead show that Sylvester Collins was the team's quarterback.
3. Contemporaneous sources do not list Jackson on the published All-SWAC teams during the 1969, 1970, or 1971 seasons.
4. Sylvester Collins rather than Fred Jackson was Jackson State's starting quarterback in both 1970 and 1971, and it was Collins who was named the All-SWAC quarterback (and also SWAC offensive player of the year) in 1971.
5. The claimed connection with Walter Payton is contradicted by the facts that Payton did not play for Jackson State until 1971 at which time Jackson was coaching high school football in Michigan. Jackson was, however, teammates at Jackson State with Payton's older brother Eddie Payton.
6. Reports that Jackson graduated from Jackson State in 1972 are contradicted by a 1971 press report calling Jackson "a recent college graduate".

=== Degrees ===
Jackson received a Bachelor of Science degree from Jackson State College (now JSU) in 1971 or 1972. MGoBlue.com indicates that Jackson received a Master of Arts degree from the University of Michigan in 1975. Multiple sources, including the United Press International, reported that Jackson received a master's degree in educational administration in 1976 from Eastern Michigan University.

== Professional career ==
=== Philadelphia Eagles ===
There are multiple contrasting sources concerning Jackson's relationship with the Philadelphia Eagles:

- A September 1971 article in The Flint Journal reported that Jackson "was drafted by the pros but didn't try out because of a knee injury". However, draft records show that Jackson was not selected in either the 1971 or 1972 NFL drafts.
- A June 1972 article in The Flint Journal reported that Jackson was drafted in the 12th round by the Eagles in 1971, and that he played in two exhibition games for the Eagles during the 1971 pre-season, but had his season cut short by an injury to ligaments in his knee.
- A 1988 article in a South Carolina newspaper reported that Jackson "spent two and a half weeks with the Philadelphia Eagles as a defensive back".
- A 2024 article in The Patriot-News of Harrisburg, Pennsylvania reported that Jackson only briefly tried out for the Eagles and did so in 1972 rather than 1971. A 2011 article in The Michigan Daily reported the Eagles gave Jackson "a shot, but cut him not long after".

No record has been found in The Philadelphia Inquirer or the Philadelphia Daily News of Jackson having any affiliation with the Eagles whether in 1971, 1972 or otherwise.

=== Flint Sabres ===
Jackson also played minor-league football as a cornerback for the Flint Sabres of the Midwest Football League. According to coverage in The Flint Journal Jackson began with the Sabres in 1972, and continued with the team through at least 1975.

=== Detroit Wheels ===
There are non-contemporaneous sources claiming that Jackson played as much as eight weeks as a quarterback for the Detroit Wheels of the World Football League. However, no contemporaneous coverage has been found confirming that he played for the Wheels. The best contemporaneous source found states that Jackson had a tryout in 1974 for a spot on the Wheels' taxi squad.

== Coaching career ==
=== Flint Southwestern ===
Although some non-contemporaneous sources listed a start date of 1972, The Flint Journal reported in September 1971 that Jackson had been hired at Flint Southwestern High School in Flint, Michigan, as an assistant football coach and as an assistant track coach. In November 1971, at the end of the football season, Flint Southwestern head coach Dar Christiansen gave much of the credit for the team's success in 1971 to his "men on the phones", including his new assistant coach, Fred Jackson.

Jackson remained an assistant coach under Dar Christianen for seven years, coaching quarterbacks and running backs. During his time as an assistant coach at Flint Southwestern, Jackson coached future Michigan quarterback, Rick Leach.

Jackson took over as head coach at Flint Southwestern in the summer of 1978. He led Southwestern to a 6–3 record in 1978 and continued as Flint Southwestern's head football coach, compiling a 5–4 record for the 1979 season. During his two years as head coach at Flint Southwestern, Jackson compiled an overall record of 11–7.

Although some non-contemporaneous sources indicate that Jackson began coaching at Toledo in 1979, multiple contemporaneous articles in The Flint Journal reported that Jackson remained the head football coach at Flint Southwestern through the 1979 season.

Jackson was also a biology teacher at Flint Southwestern. He coached the junior varsity basketball team during the 1972–73 season and also coached the school's track and field team starting in 1973. He led the track squads to Michigan Class A championships in 1975 and 1977 and was named the Michigan High School Athletic Association track and field coach of the year in 1977. In recognition of his contributions at Flint Southwestern, Jackson was inducted into the Greater Flint African American Sports Hall of Fame in 2010.

=== Toledo ===
Jackson was hired as an assistant football coach at the University of Toledo in January 1980. Toledo's head coach, Chuck Stobart, explained his decision to hire Jackson: "I think Fred had a lot to do with Rick Leach's development. I have some very good recommendations on him." Jackson coached receivers, tight ends, flankers and split ends at Toledo. When Stobart left Toledo in 1982 to become the head football coach at the University of Utah, he approached Jackson about joining him there, but Jackson opted to stay at Toledo, and was promoted to offensive coordinator under Stobart's successor, Dan Simrell. The 1982 Toledo team, with Jackson as offensive coordinator, compiled a 6–5 record and scored 184 points, an average of 16.7 points per game. Jackson remained at Toledo until July 1983.

=== Wisconsin ===
In July 1983, Jackson was hired as an assistant coach at Wisconsin. He was Wisconsin's receivers coach from 1983 through 1985.

Wisconsin head coach Dave McClain died of cardiac arrest in April 1986 at age 48. Defensive coordinator Jim Hilles took over as interim head coach, and Jackson was given the added responsibility of being the "lead coach" on offense and play-caller for the 1986 season; Hilles chose not to designate an "offensive coordinator" and instead gave Jackson the title of "lead coach" on offense. The 1986 Wisconsin team compiled a 3–9 record, and Hilles and Jackson were fired at the end of the season. As Jackson cleaned out his office, he told a reporter: "I'm not bitter. You can't live your life that way. . . . I'm hurting inside. But I've got to go on with my life. I don't know what I'm going to do. I'll try anything I can to stay in coaching."

=== Navy ===
In January 1987, Jackson was hired as the wide receivers coach under head coach Elliot Uzelac at Navy. The 1987 Navy team compiled a 2–9 record, as no Navy receiver tallied more than 13 receptions or 261 yards for the season.

=== South Carolina ===
After one season at Navy, Jackson was hired at South Carolina as the wide receivers and tight ends coach.

=== Purdue ===
In February 1989, Jackson was hired as the quarterbacks coach under head coach Fred Akers at Purdue. Prior to the start of 1990 season, Jackson was named offensive coordinator at Purdue. For the 1990 season, he was both offensive coordinator and quarterbacks coach. The 1990 Purdue team compiled a 2–9 record. While quarterback Eric Hunter ranked second in the Big Ten with 2,355 passing yards, the 1990 Purdue offense as a whole ranked ninth in the conference with an average of 16.1 points per game. After the first nine-loss season in Purdue history, Akers was asked to resign as head coach at the end of the 1990 season.

=== Vanderbilt ===
In January 1991, Jackson was hired as the quarterbacks coach at Vanderbilt. Vanderbilt ranked last in the SEC in passing for the 1991 season, as playing time at quarterback was divided between Marcus WIlson (491 passing yards), Mike Healey (352 passing yards), and Jeff Brothers (278 passing yards).

=== Michigan (first stint) ===
In 1986, Bo Schembechler offered Jackson a job as a position coach on his staff at the University of Michigan. The two had forged a relationship during the recruitment of Rick Leach in 1974. Jackson turned him down as he had been promoted to offensive coordinator for Wisconsin that season. In 1992, Schembechler had retired as the head coach, though he retained front office responsibilities and had an office at the university. Schembechler again offered Jackson a job as the running backs coach, with the added caveat that if he did not accept this time he would not be offered again. Jackson resigned his position at Vanderbilt in May 1992 to serve as Michigan's running backs coach. At the time of the hiring, head coach Gary Moeller noted that he had known Jackson for a long time and knew him to be "an excellent football coach and an excellent person".

He remained at Michigan from 1992 to 2014, eventually becoming the longest tenured member of the football coaching staff. He served on the staffs of head coaches Moeller, Lloyd Carr, Rich Rodriguez and Brady Hoke. He was the only assistant retained by Rodriguez and Hoke. In June 1995, Lloyd Carr, in one of his first major moves as Michigan's head coach, promoted Jackson to offensive coordinator. Jackson remained the team's offensive coordinator during the 1995 and 1996 seasons. In February 1997, Mike DeBord took over as offensive coordinator, and Jackson took DeBord's former job as assistant head coach. Jackson remained assistant head coach through the 2002 season. He was a finalist for the Broyles Award in 2000 and received the AFCA Assistant Coach of the Year Award in 2001. He became associate head coach from 2003 to 2007. Jackson was assistant head coach of Michigan's national championship teams in 1997. He was the position coach for many of the program's best running backs, including Tyrone Wheatley, Tim Biakabutuka, Anthony Thomas, Chris Perry, and Mike Hart.

After the 2014 season, Jackson was officially listed as retired, though he was open to joining Jim Harbaugh when he took over as head coach in 2015. When he was not retained, he felt a little betrayed by Harbaugh, especially because he didn't recruit his son Josh Jackson either, who was a senior quarterback from Saline High School in 2015. Jackson did not return to Michigan Stadium for the next five years.

=== Ypsilanti Community High School ===
After leaving Michigan in 2015, Jackson became dean of students at Ypsilanti Community High School in Ypsilanti, Michigan. When the school's football coach resigned after the 2015 football season, Jackson took on the added responsibility of coaching the football team. At the time, Jackson said he still loved the game, looked forward to molding lives, and added, "I'm not done yet." He made his debut as Ypsilanti Community's football coach in 2016, compiling a 2–7 record in his first year on the job. He continued as head coach in 2017, compiling a 4–7 record in his second year as head coach. Jackson stepped down as head football coach prior to the start of the 2018 season, but continued as dean of students after 2017.

=== Michigan (second stint) ===
After a chance encounter in 2022, Jim Harbaugh invited Jackson to return to the program, and Jackson accepted. He has served since that time as the assistant running backs coach, serving under head coaches Harbaugh, Sherrone Moore and Kyle Whittingham. Jackson won a second national championship with the program in 2023, and helped coach Blake Corum to back-to-back All-American honors. In 2026, Jackson was retained in the same role under new head coach, Whittingham.

== Family ==
Jackson has a wife, Teresa, a daughter, Tonya, and three sons, Fred Jr., Jeremy, and Josh Jackson. Fred Jr. walked on as a quarterback briefly for the Western Michigan Broncos before transferring to Jackson State in the mid-1990s. Jeremy was a wide receiver for the Michigan Wolverines, 2010 to 2013, and Josh was a quarterback for the Maryland Terrapins and Virginia Tech Hokies from 2016 to 2019.
