= Amy Devers =

American carpenter and television host

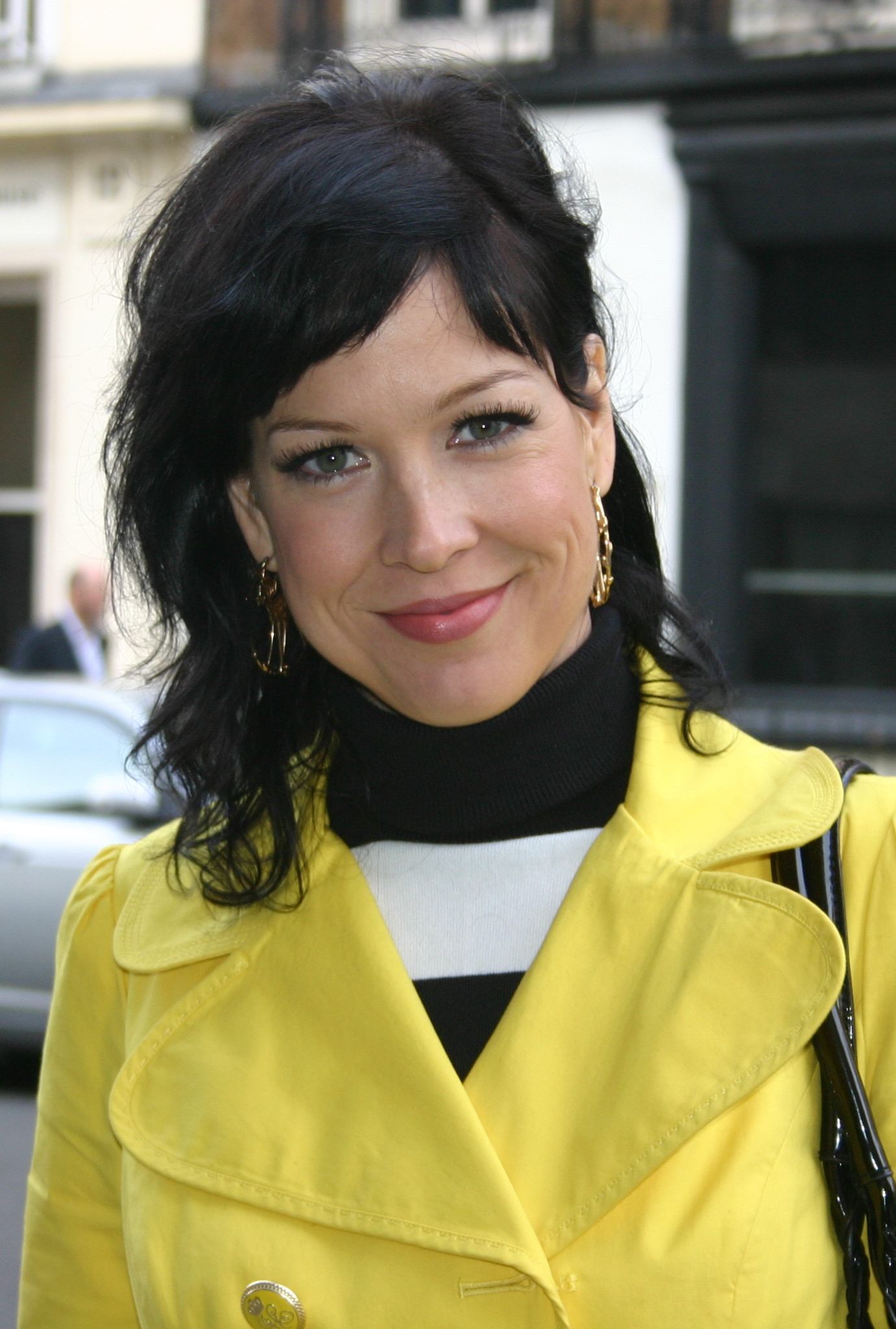
- Amy Devers in London filming Designer People.
- Born: Amy Devers; July 2, 1971 (age 55); Ypsilanti, Michigan, United States
- Occupations: TV host and design expert
- Known for: American furniture designer and television personality.

Amy Devers (born July 2, 1971) is an American furniture designer, carpenter, television personality and design blogger. She currently is the host (with Alan Luxmore) and design expert on A&E's Fix This Yard, the host of Victory Garden’s edibleFEAST on PBS, and a design and carpentry expert on OWN’s Home Made Simple. In the past she has hosted design oriented programs such as Freeform Furniture on DIY, Designer People on Ovation, and was a carpenter on TLC’s Trading Spaces.

== Early life and education ==
Devers grew up in Ypsilanti, Michigan, where she attended Ypsilanti High School. She graduated from the Fashion Institute of Technology in New York with a two-year degree in fashion buying and merchandising before deciding to pursue furniture design. She studied furniture design at San Diego State University and graduated with a BA in 1997. After a spell working as a machine shop foreman, Devers attended graduate school at Rhode Island School of Design, where she earned her MFA in Furniture Design in 2001.

== Career ==
=== Television ===
Devers began her television career in 2003 as a home-improvement expert on the DIY Network series DIY to the Rescue, which she co-hosted with Karl Champley. The series ran for 9 seasons and included specials at the Grand Ole Opry and a post-Hurricane Katrina rebuild special in collaboration with Dr. Phil.

She hosted Freeform Furniture on DIY, a series which featured Devers demonstrating how to build her original modern furniture designs using diverse materials and techniques. In 2007, she hosted DIY's interactive series, Blog Cabin. In 2008 she joined the cast of TLC’s Trading Spaces as a carpenter. In 2009 Ovation premiered a second season of Designer People with Devers as the new host.

In 2010 A&E launched Fix This Yard, a landscape makeover series, with Alan Luxmore and Devers as co-hosts and design experts. She makes regular appearances as a design and carpentry expert on OWN's Home Made Simple. On PBS, Devers is the host of Victory Garden’s edibleFEAST, a documentary series that highlights local and sustainable food stories.

=== Podcast ===
Devers hosts a podcast titled Clever with Jamie Derringer of Design Milk in which they interview designers and artists about their life and work. Clever hosted a live podcast and conversation series as part of WantedDesign Manhattan in 2019.

=== Art and Design ===
She runs a design and build studio out of Los Angeles called Amy Devers Art/Design. In 2012 she participated alongside Tanya Aguiñiga in Natalie Chanin's chair restoration project as a part of MakeShift conference.

=== Author ===
As an author, Devers has served as an advice columnist for ReadyMade Magazine and Modern Ink Magazine. She is the co-author of DIY to the Rescue 50 Home Improvement Projects published by Lark Books in 2006. This book is a compilation of projects from the hit DIY TV series with step-by-step instructions and photos.

=== Educator ===
Devers is faculty in the Furniture Design department at the Rhode Island School of Design.
