= Ypsilanti Public School District =

School district in Michigan, United States

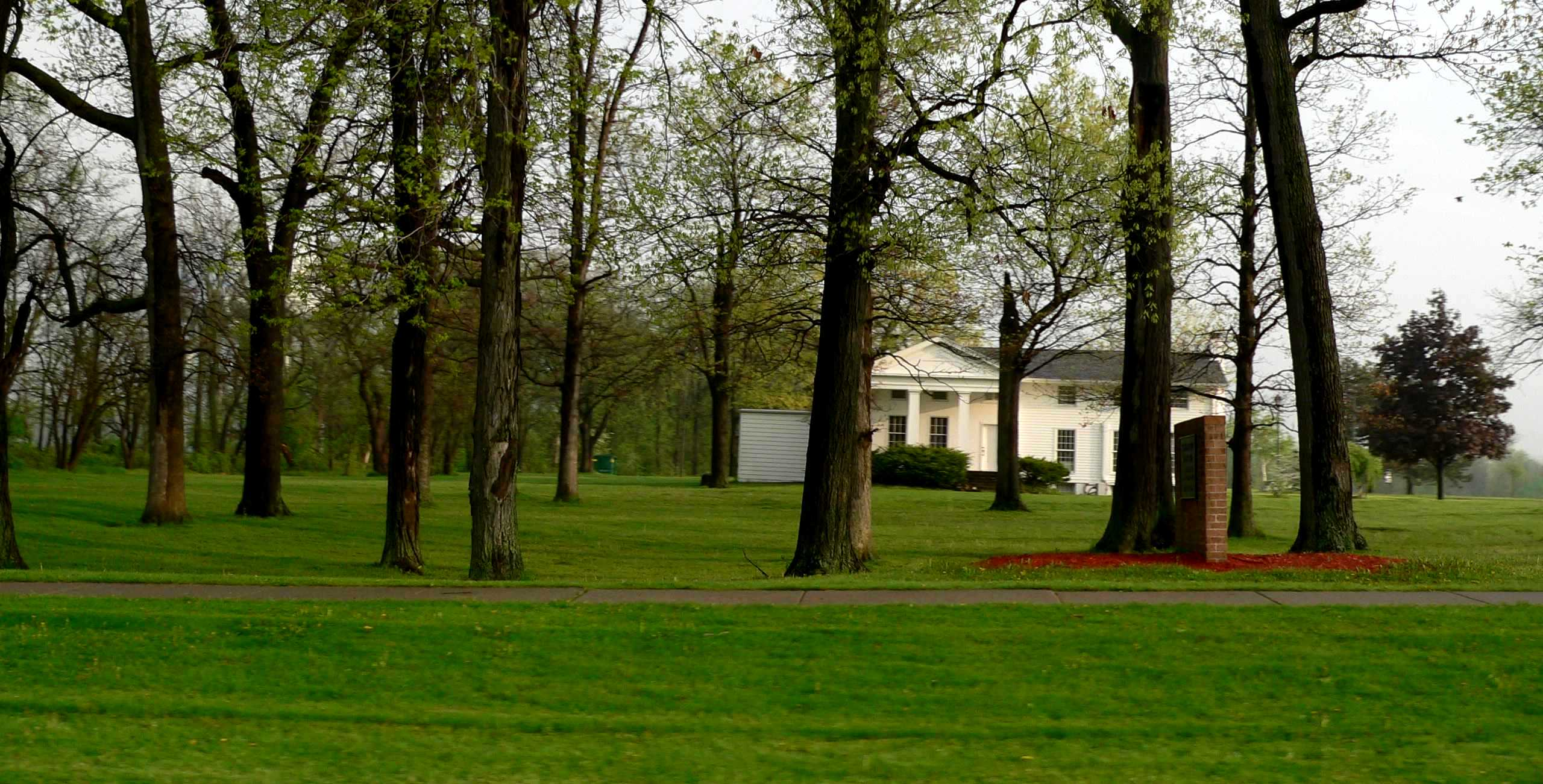
- The Ypsilanti Public Schools' offices, on Packard Road

District information
- Closed: 2013

The Ypsilanti Public School District was a public school district in Ypsilanti Township, Michigan, and serving Ypsilanti and portions of Ypsilanti and Superior townships. Its State of Michigan School District code was 81020. It merged with Willow Run Community Schools and formed Ypsilanti Community Schools in 2013.

== History ==
In the 1940s officials from the federal government of the United States asked the Ypsilanti City School District to annex the Willow Run area, which included the Spencer School District. A referendum was held for voters in the Spencer School District, and Spencer voters rejected the measure on a 3-1 basis despite messages of support for the merger from the Spencer school district parent-teacher organization (PTA) and other area leaders. The Spencer district changed its name to the Willow Run district.

As of the 2006–2007 school year, the Ypsilanti district used the four-tier system composed of Pre-K/K, 1–5, 6–8, and 9-12 Grade Levels that it has used since the 1993–1994 school year. Prior to that, the district used a system composed of Pre-K/K, 1–6, 7–9, and 10-12 Grade Levels since the transition of Perry to a Pre-K/K building.

On June 8, 2009, the YPS school board unanimously passed a resolution to "discuss options for the consideration and sharing of services" with the Lincoln School District, which had passed a similar resolution. Board members also left open the option of incorporating the Willow Run School District into the talks at a future date.

On November 6, 2012, voters in both the Ypsilanti and Willow Run School Districts voted to consolidate the two districts. The two districts became one unified district, Ypsilanti Community Schools, on July 1, 2013. A unified school board, appointed by the Washtenaw Intermediate School District Board of Education, was formed to oversee the transition.

The final day of classes for YPS was Friday June 7, 2013.

== Schools ==
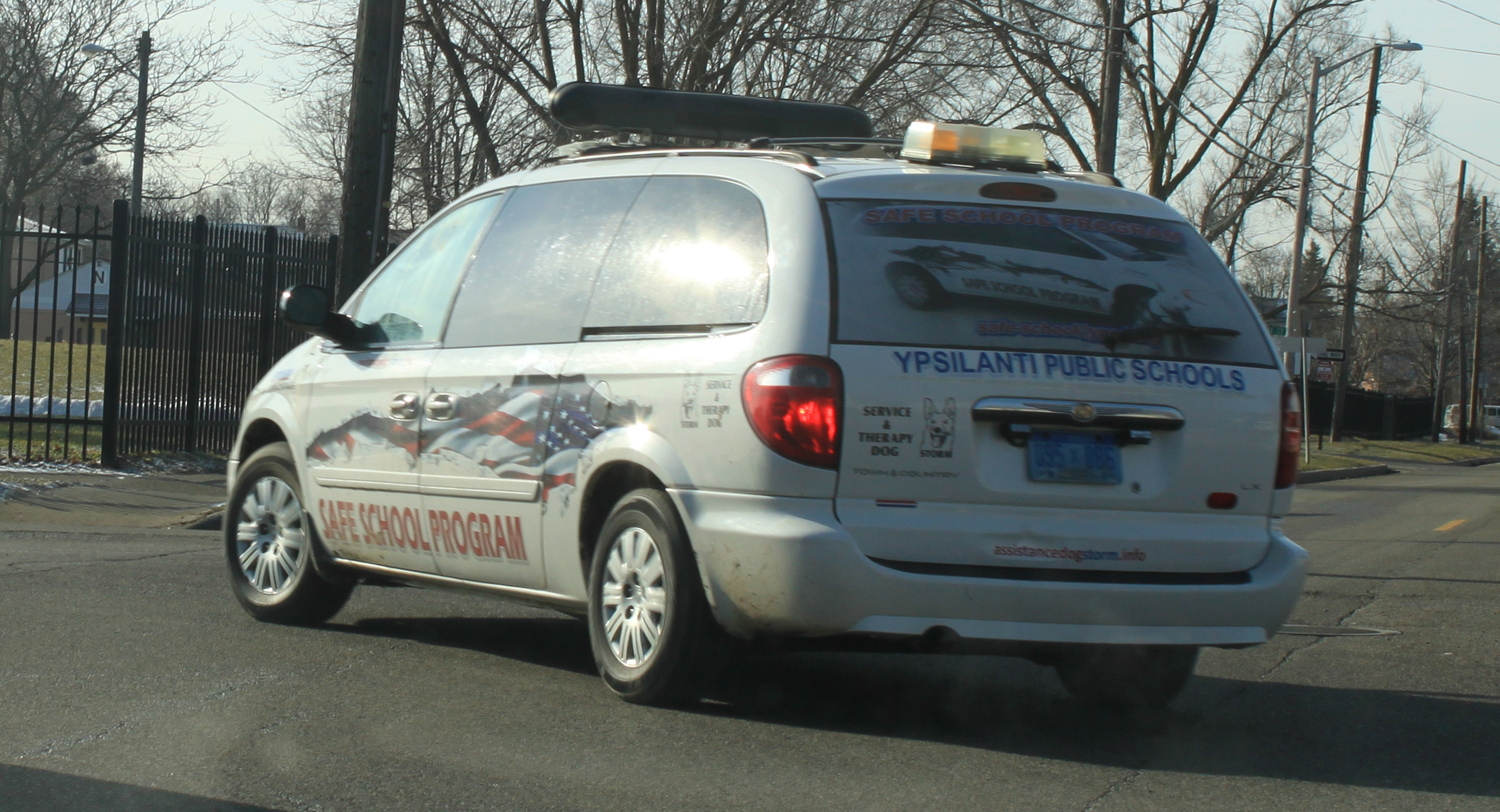
Ypsilanti Public Schools Safe School Program vehicle. The program's mission is to prevent substance abuse.

=== Pre-School/Kindergarten ===
- Perry Child Development Center

=== Elementary Schools (Grades 1-5) ===
- Adams Math and Science Academy (Closed at the end of 2015/2016 school year)
- Erickson Elementary School
- Estabrook Elementary School (Grades 2–5)

=== Middle Schools (Grades 6-8) ===
- Ypsilanti Middle School (formerly West Middle School)
- Washtenaw International Middle Academy (formerly East Middle School)

=== High School (Grades 9-12) ===
- Ypsilanti High School
- Ypsilanti STEM Middle College)

=== Other Schools ===
- New Directions Alternative Education (formerly known as Fletcher Elementary School; named for Elizabeth Fletcher, mother of Harris Fletcher)
- Forest Avenue School
- Regional Career Technical Center (RCTC)

== Former schools ==
- George Elementary School (most recently known as George Multiage Academy)
- Chapelle Community School (formerly Chapelle Elementary School)
