= Willow Run High School =

Public school in Ypsilanti Township, Michigan, US

Coordinates: 42°15′07.3″N 83°34′16.0″W

Willow Run High School was a public high school in Ypsilanti Township, Michigan. It was the high school of the Willow Run School District prior to the 2013 merger with the Ypsilanti Community Schools (YCS).

The "Flyers" were the school mascot.

After the merger, Ypsilanti Community High School, located in the former Ypsilanti High School building, became the consolidated comprehensive high school for the new YCS district.

The Willow Run building now houses the Character and Restorative Education (CARE) program of YCS.

== R. Wiley Brownlee ==
On April 3, 1971, Willow Run High principal R. Wiley Brownlee was driven off the road he was traveling on, then tarred and feathered by five Ku Klux Klan members, to discourage his lobbying to formally recognize the life and work of Martin Luther King Jr., and in an attempt to discourage him from promoting racial harmony at the high school. He went on to become deputy superintendent for Ann Arbor Public Schools in 1974.

Brownlee, an avid aviator and life-long civil rights activist, died in Ann Arbor, Michigan, on January 1, 2004.

== Notable alumni ==
- Shannon Withem, Class of 1990, Baseball Player
- Nickolas Ashford, Class of 1959, Producer and Songwriter for Motown, Warner Bros. and Capital Music.
- Cory DeVante Williams, Class of 2010, Popular YouTuber famous for gaming and reaction content
