= Ypsilanti Community High School =

High school in Ypsilanti, Michigan, United States

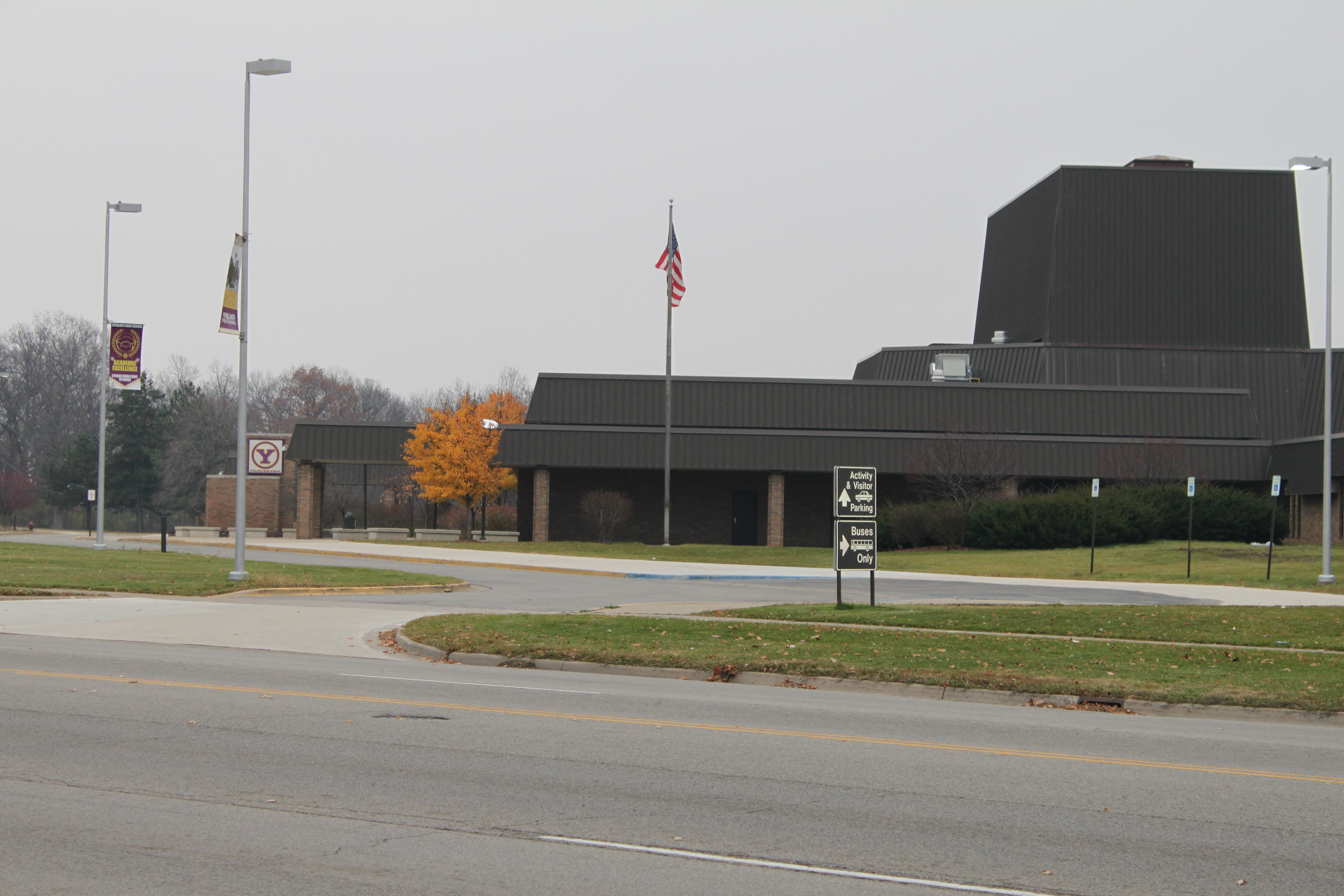

Location
- 2095 Packard Road; Ypsilanti Township, Washtenaw County, Michigan 48197; United States
- Coordinates: 42°14′40″N 83°38′44″W

Information
- School type: Public, Secondary
- School district: Ypsilanti Community Schools
- Principal: Cory Gildersleeve
- Grades: 9–12
- Colors: Black and Vegas gold
- Nickname: Grizzlies
- Website: https://www.ycschools.us/our-schools/high-school/ychs/

Student assessments
- 2021–22 school year Change vs. prior year

M-STEP 11th grade proficiency rates (Science / Social Studies)
- Advanced %: ≤5 / ≤5
- Proficient %: ≤5 / –
- PR. Proficient %: – / 61.9
- Not Proficient %: – / 28.3

Average test scores
- SAT Total: 754.0 (▼ −65.7)

Ypsilanti Community High School is a public high school located near Ypsilanti, Michigan. The school is the main high school in the Ypsilanti Community Schools district.

== History ==
Ypsilanti Community High School was founded in 2013 as part of the merger of Willow Run Community Schools and the Ypsilanti Public School District into Ypsilanti Community Schools. YCHS is the successor to Ypsilanti High School and Willow Run High School, using the Ypsilanti High School building which had opened in 1973.
