= Designer People =

Television series

- Directed by: Ross Close
- Country of origin: United States

Original release
- Network: Ovation
- Release: 10 November 2008 – 30 April 2010

Designer People is a television documentary series launched in 2008 directed by Ross Close. Each episode showcases one of the world's leading artists in architectural design, communication design, industrial design, interior design, and fashion, centering on the creative insight of the acclaimed designer. The series was broadcast on Ovation.

== Hosts ==
- Erika Oman
- Lee Lin Chin
- Amy Devers

== Seasons ==
Two full seasons have been broadcast. Season 1 was broadcast originally from 10 November 2008 to 29 January 2009. A second season aired from 9 November 2009 to 30 April 2010.

=== Season 1 (2008–2009) ===
1. Yves Behar: Swiss industrial designer and founder of Fuseproject (10 Nov 2008)
2. Chris Lee: communication designer and founder of Asylum design company
3. Jakob Trollback: Swedish communication designer
4. Qiu Hao: Chinese fashion designer
5. Ole Scheeren: German architect famous for his design of the CCTV headquarters in Beijing
6. Max Wolff: Australian automotive designer
7. Edward Fella: commercial graphic designer
8. Young Baek Min: Korean interior designer
9. Nipa Doshi & Jonathan Levien: Industrial designers discussing their creative partnership
10. Antonio Ochoa: Venezuelan architect and interior designer
11. Jens Martin Skibsted: Danish industrial designer
12. Kenji Ekuan: Japanese industrial designer
13. Anouska Hempel

=== Season 2 (2009–2010) ===
1. Zaha Hadid
2. Marc Newson
3. Marcel Wanders
4. Michael Young
5. Zandra Rhodes
6. Jürgen Mayer
7. Ilan Waisbrod
8. Gilles et Boissier
9. Bjarke Ingels
10. Mitchell Wolfson Jr.
11. Karim Rashid
12. Emmanuel Picault
13. M/M Paris
