= Superior Township, Washtenaw County, Michigan =

Superior Township, Michigan
- Charter township
- Charter Township of Superior
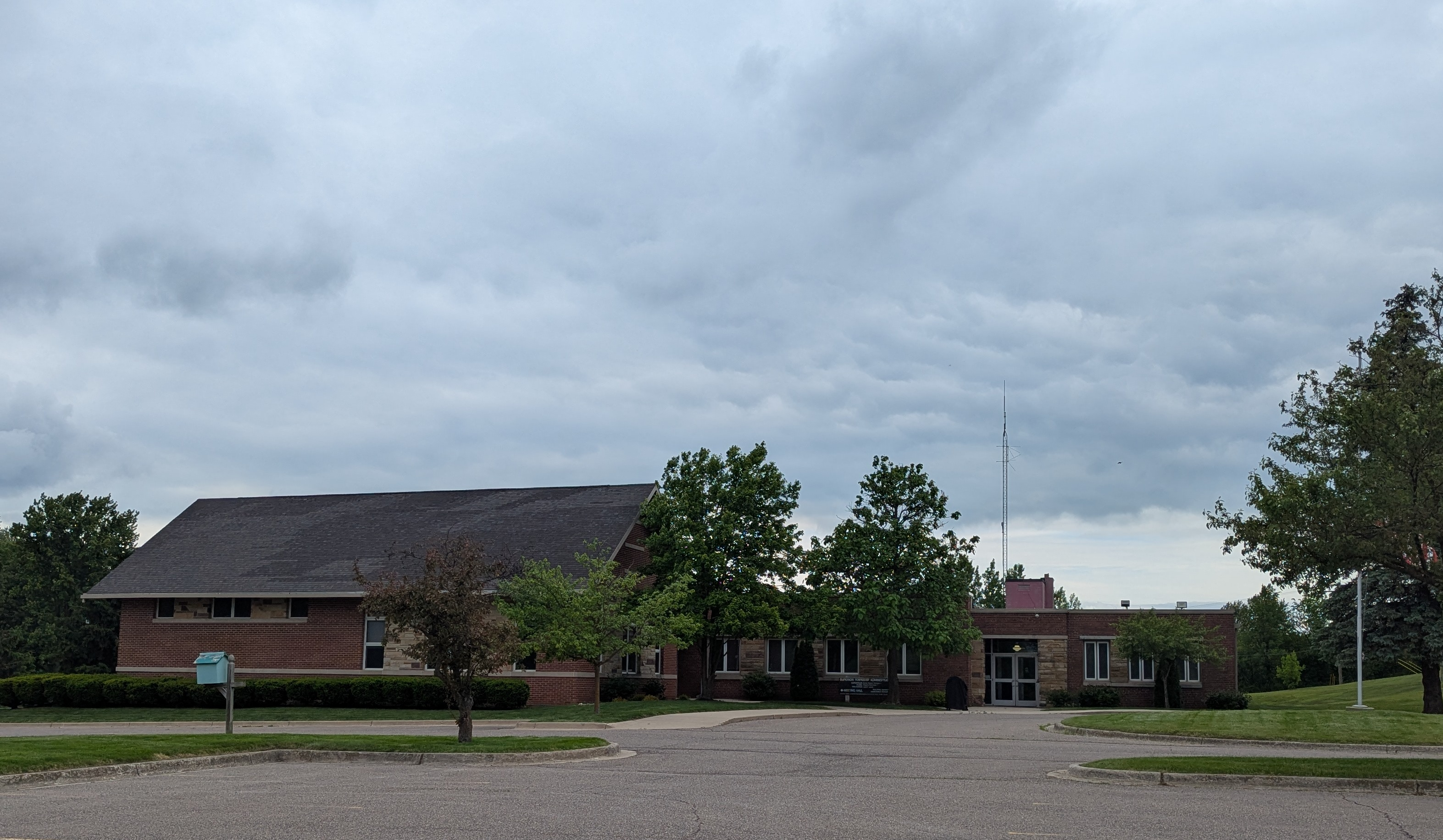
- Township Hall along N. Prospect Road

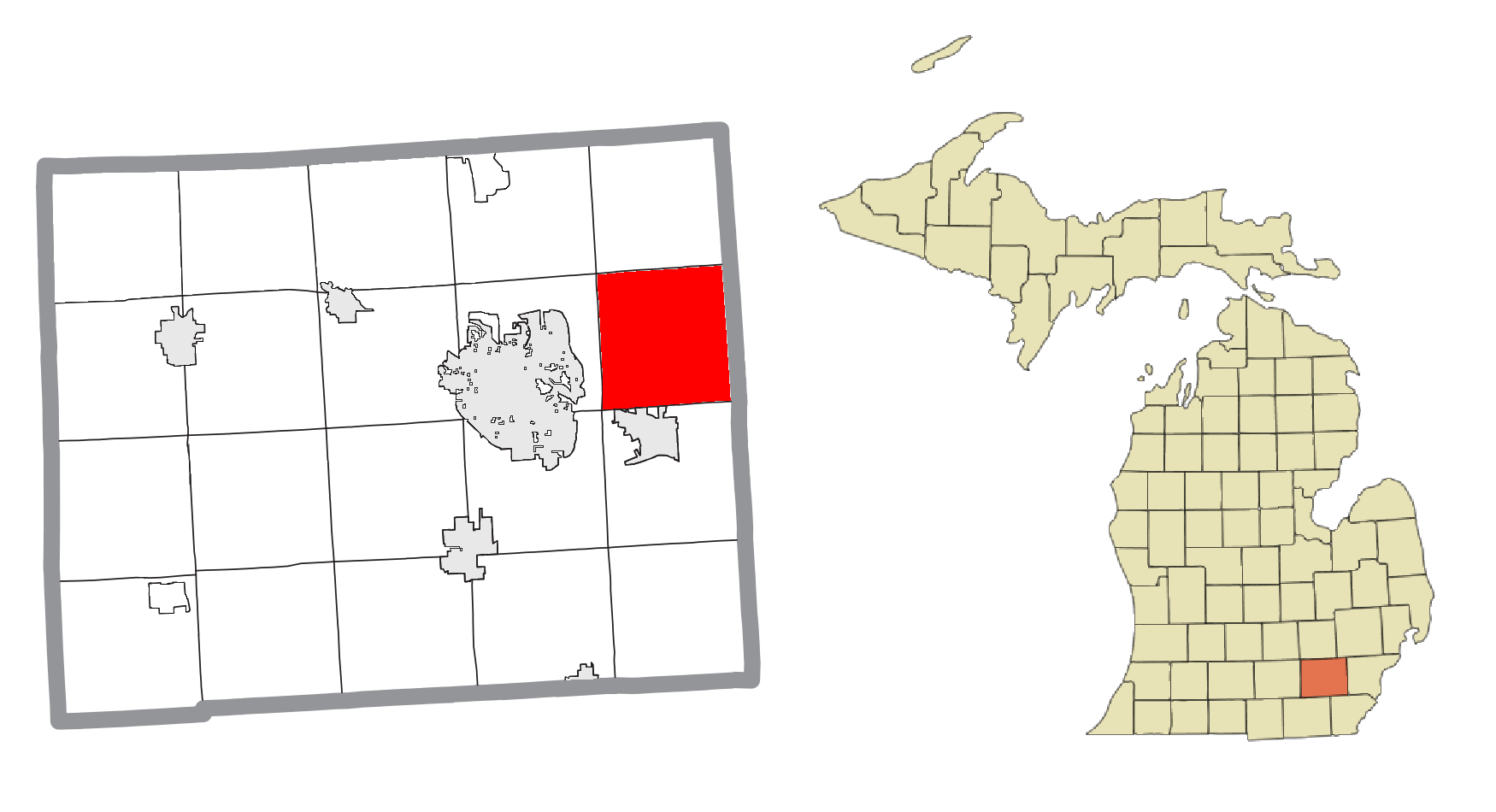
- Location within Washtenaw County

- Location within the state of Michigan Location within the United States
- Coordinates: 42°17′38″N 83°36′23″W
- Country: United States
- State: Michigan
- County: Washtenaw
- Established: 1831

Government
  - Supervisor: Kenneth Schwartz
  - Clerk: Lynette Findley

Area
  - Total: 35.56 sq mi (92.10 km^{2})
  - Land: 35.21 sq mi (91.19 km^{2})
  - Water: 0.35 sq mi (0.91 km^{2})
- Elevation: 820 ft (250 m)

Population (2020)
  - Total: 14,832
  - Density: 421.3/sq mi (162.6/km^{2})
- Time zone: UTC-5 (Eastern (EST))
  - Summer (DST): UTC-4 (EDT)
- ZIP code(s): 48105 (Ann Arbor); 48170 (Plymouth); 48197, 48198 (Ypsilanti)
- Area code: 734
- FIPS code: 26-77560
- GNIS feature ID: 1627141
- Website: superior-twp.org

Superior Charter Township is a charter township in Washtenaw County in the U.S. state of Michigan. The population was 14,832 at the 2020 census.

== Communities ==
- Dixboro is an unincorporated community located within the township at 42°18′44″N 83°39′22″W. Dixboro was settled as early as 1825 by John Dix and was platted in 1826 by A. B. Rowe. The name was first recorded in 1828 at a time when the area was still administratively part of Wayne County until Washtenaw County was created in 1829. A post office opened under the name Dixborough, which was named after John Dix, on December 6, 1825. The post office closed on September 25, 1850. The post office was then restored on two separate occasions from July 11, 1861 until January 20, 1863 and again from May 26, 1890 until it ultimately closed on June 15, 1905. Even after John Dix sold his properties and moved to Texas in 1833, the community was growing faster than the nearby community of Ann Arbor. However, the railroads bypassed Dixboro in favor of Ann Arbor, and the community slowly dwindled. The oldest structure within the community is the Dixboro General Store, which was built in 1840.
- Frain Lake is an unincorporated community located within the township at 42°19′44″N 83°37′01″W. It is along Plymouth Road near the small lake of the same name. The name of the lake and community are sometimes spelled as Frains Lake or Frain's Lake. The settlement began in 1835 when Michael Frain from New York came to the area and purchased land in Superior Township.
- Geer is a historic settlement that was named after early settler William Geer, who became the first postmaster when the Geer post office opened on June 13, 1890. The post office closed on August 31, 1900. A one-room schoolhouse, now named the Geer School since he also served as an elected school director, remains standing and is now a county-designated historic site. It was constructed in 1880 to replace an earlier 1829 log structure, and it was an active educational facility until it closed in 1982. It is currently owned by Plymouth-Canton Community Schools and used as a historic exhibit.
- Superior is an unincorporated community located within the township just north of the Huron River at 42°15′47″N 83°38′16″W. Robert Fleming bought the first plot of land here in the Michigan Territory in 1823. A sawmill was built in 1826, and the Bank of Superior was established in the community in 1838. A post office named Superior operated from March 2, 1838 until June 20, 1862.

== Geography ==
According to the U.S. Census Bureau, the township has a total area of 35.56 square miles (92.10 km^{2}), of which 35.21 square miles (91.19 km^{2}) is land and 0.35 square miles (0.91 km^{2}) (0.98%) is water.

The Superior Dam is located in the southwest corner along the Huron River.

=== Major highways ===
- M-14 runs briefly through the northwest corner of the township.
- M-153 (Ford Road) runs east–west through the township and has its western terminus at M-14.

== Demographics ==
As of the census of 2000, there were 10,740 people, 3,961 households, and 2,911 families residing in the township. The population density was 303.7 inhabitants per square mile (117.3/km^{2}). There were 4,097 housing units at an average density of 115.9 per square mile (44.7/km^{2}). The racial makeup of the township was 63.01% White, 30.81% African American, 2.30% Asian, 1.83% Hispanics or Latinos, 0.47% Native American, 0.03% Pacific Islander, 0.71% from other races, and 2.67% from two or more races.

There were 3,961 households, out of which 38.0% had children under the age of 18 living with them, 53.0% were married couples living together, 16.8% had a female householder with no husband present, and 26.5% were non-families. 21.1% of all households were made up of individuals, and 3.9% had someone living alone who was 65 years of age or older. The average household size was 2.67, and the average family size was 3.10.

In the township the population was spread out, with 28.9% under the age of 18, 8.6% from 18 to 24, 29.2% from 25 to 44, 25.5% from 45 to 64, and 7.8% who were 65 years of age or older. The median age was 34 years. For every 100 females, there were 89.7 males. For every 100 females age 18 and over, there were 85.3 males.

The median income for a household in the township was $56,622, and the median income for a family was $64,916. Males had a median income of $50,351 versus $35,417 for females. The per capita income for the township was $31,093. About 8.4% of families and 9.6% of the population were below the poverty line, including 15.0% of those under age 18 and 7.3% of those age 65 or over.

== Education ==
Superior Charter Township is served by three separate public school districts. The majority of the township is served by Ypsilanti Community Schools, and portions of Willow Run Community Schools also served the township until it was absorbed by Ypsilanti Community Schools in 2013. The northwestern portion of the township is served by Ann Arbor Public Schools. A small northeastern portion of the township is served by Plymouth-Canton Community Schools.

== Notable person ==
- Harris Fletcher (1892–1979), academic, author, and leading authority on John Milton

== Dixboro Ghost ==
In 1846, Isaac Van Woert swore in an affidavit to a justice of the peace in Ann Arbor that he had been visited by the ghost of Martha Mullholland, who told him she had been murdered by a doctor at the behest of her brother-in-law, James Mullholland, to keep her from returning to Canada, and who had committed another murder and dumped the body in Frains Lake. His claims were investigated but were not substantiated. This spectral visitation would later become known as the "Dixboro Ghost.

== Images ==
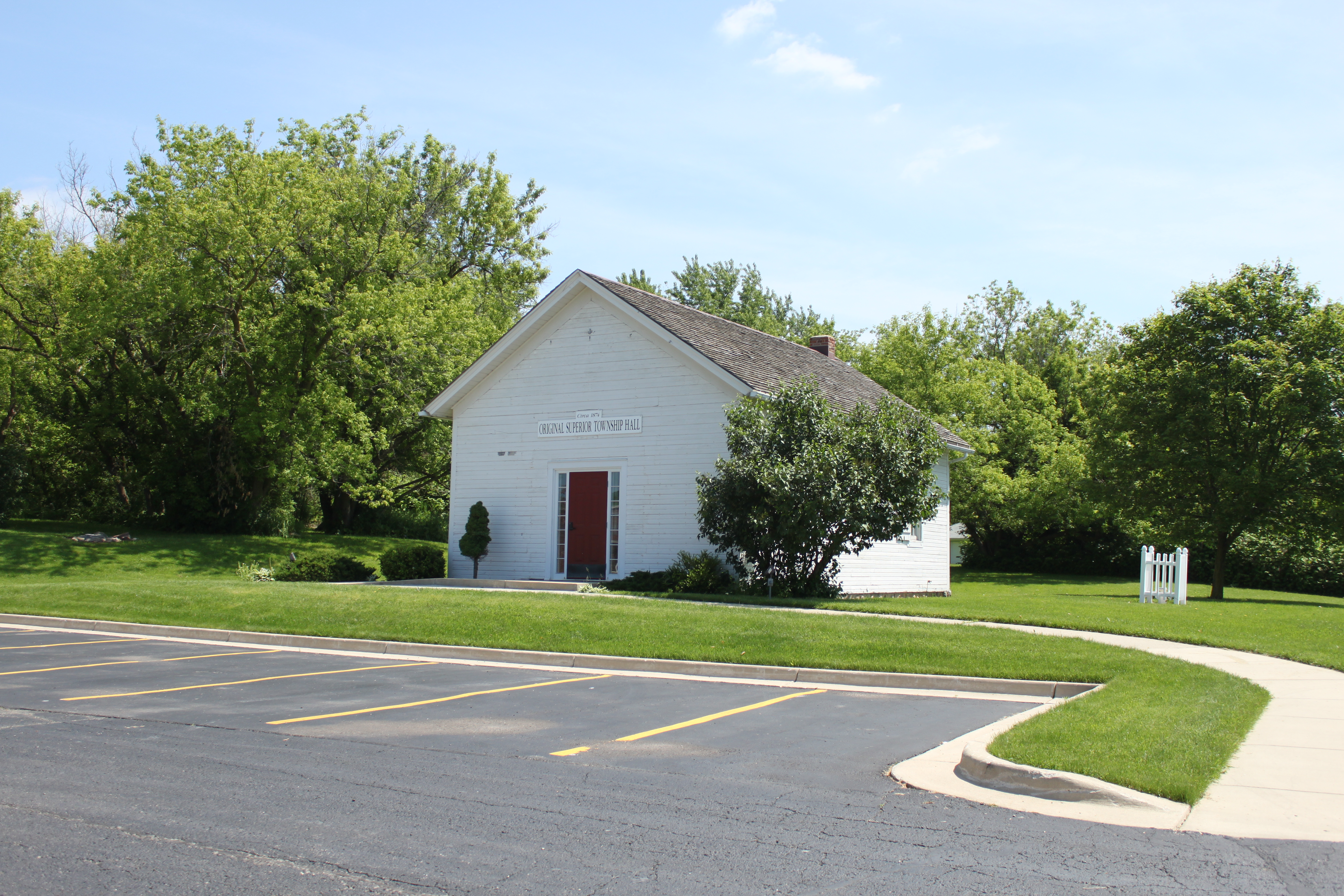
Original Superior Township Hall

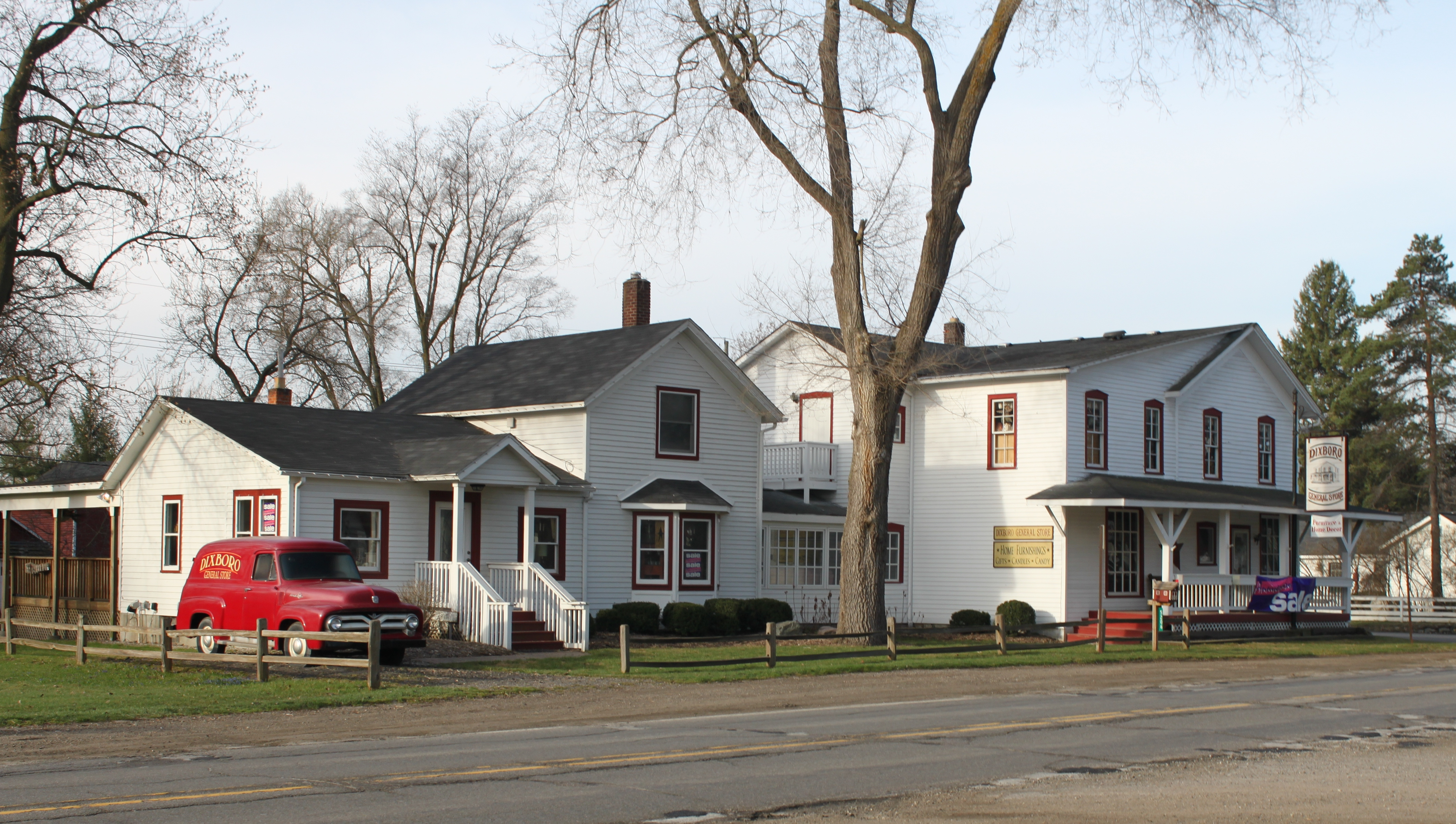
Dixboro General Store

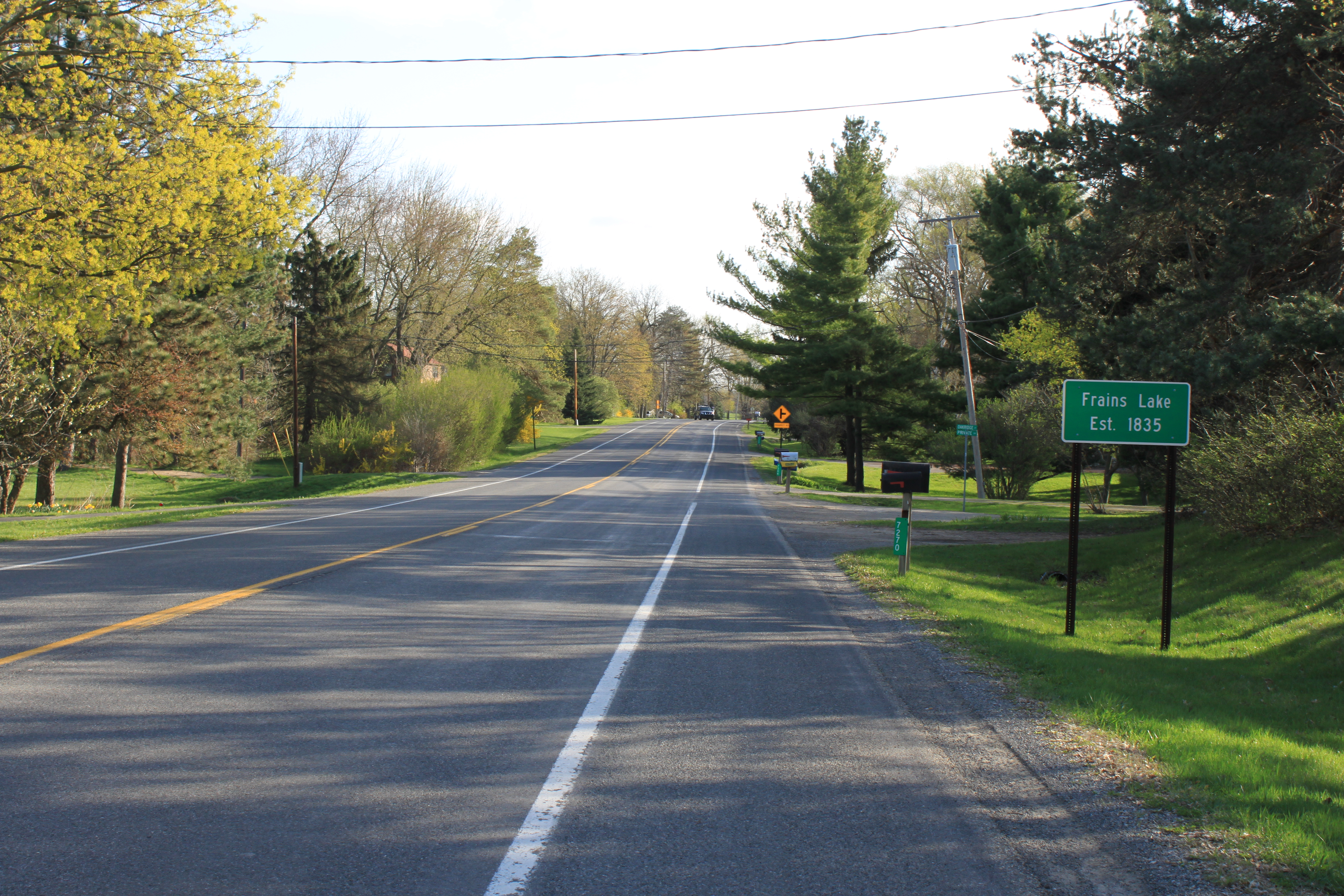
Unincorporated community of Frains Lake

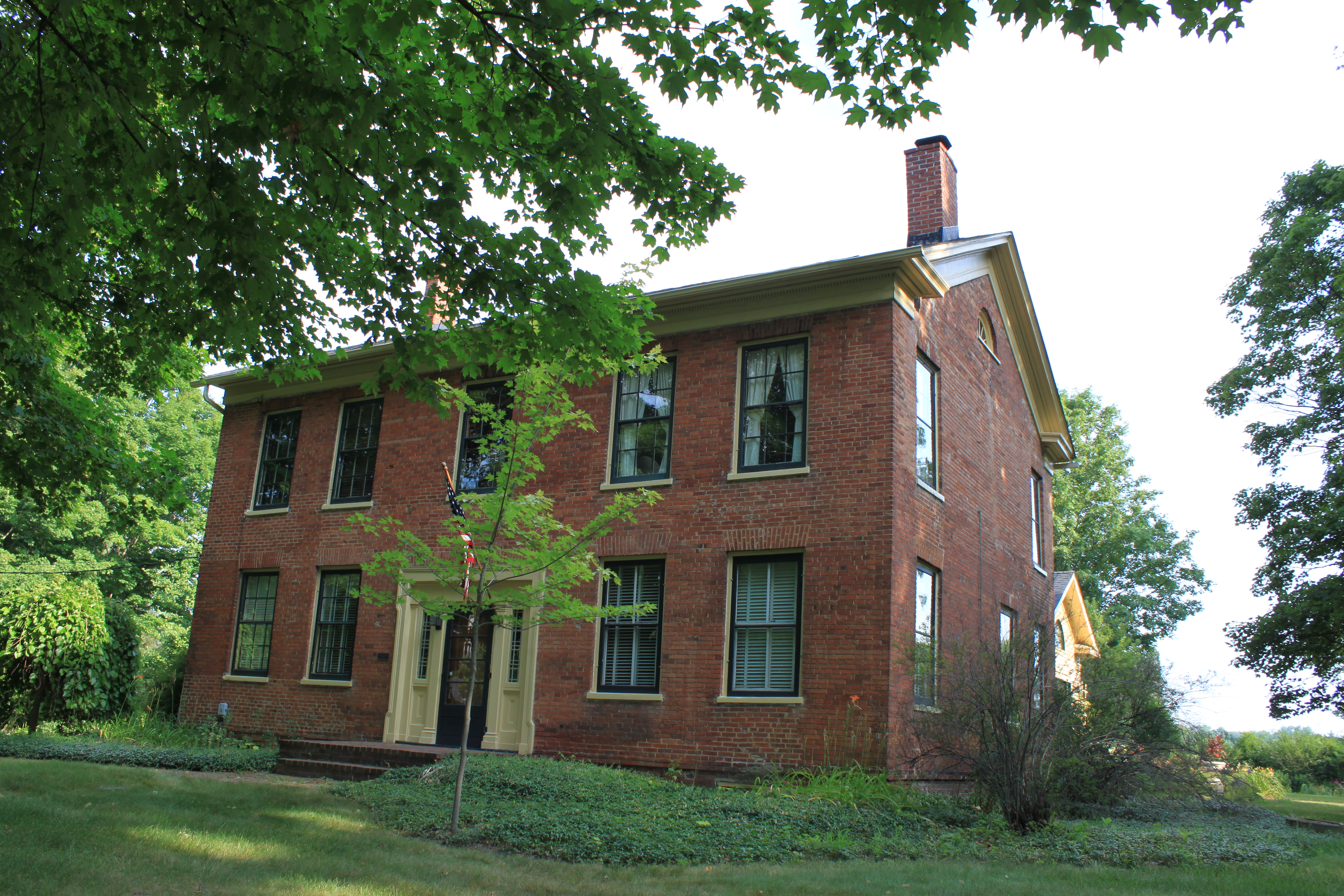
Esek Pray House
