= 2009–10 Mid-American Conference season =

Mid-American Conference
- Conference: NCAA
- Founded: 1946
- Commissioner: Jon Steinbrecher (since 2009)
- Sports fielded: 23; men's: 11; women's: 12
- Division: Division I
- Subdivision: FBS
- No. of teams: 12 full members 7 associate members
- Headquarters: Cleveland, OH
- Region: Great Lakes
- Official website: http://www.mac-sports.com/

Locations
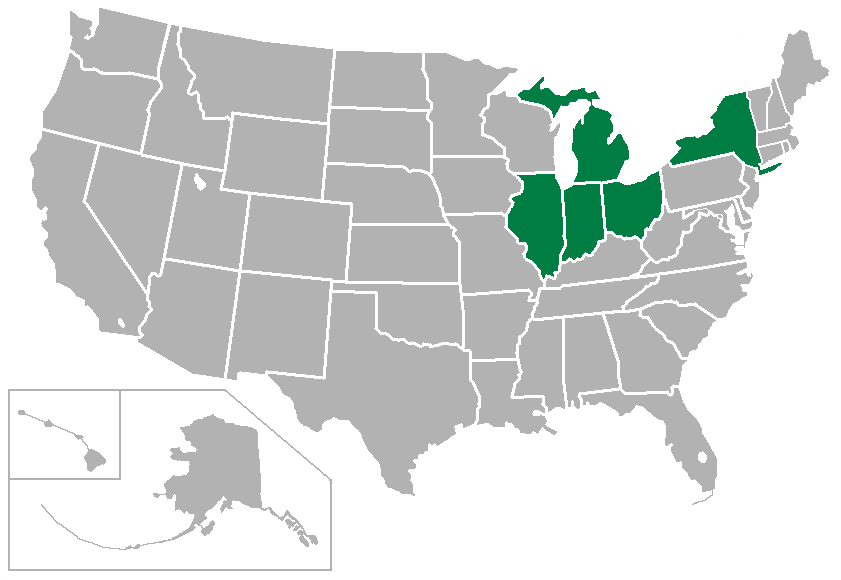

The 2009–10 Mid-American Conference season is the 64th season in Mid-American Conference (MAC) existence. Teams in this conference complete in the National Collegiate Athletic Association's Division I competitions. In this season, the Mid-American Conference (MAC) sponsored 23 sports (11 men's and 12 women's).

== Member schools ==
The MAC has both full members and affiliate members. Full members participate in Mid-American Conference for all of their Division I athletics, unless the conference doesn't sponsor the sport.

=== Full membership ===
12 teams enjoyed full membership in the Mid-American Conference for the 2009–10 season. The teams are divided geographically into East and West Divisions.

Institution	Nickname	Location	Founded	Fall 2008 Enrollment
East Division
University of Akron	Zips	Akron, Ohio	1870	24,202
Bowling Green State University	Falcons	Bowling Green, Ohio	1910	17,874
University at Buffalo	Bulls	Buffalo, New York	1846	28,192
Kent State University	Golden Flashes	Kent, Ohio	1910	22,578
Miami University	RedHawks	Oxford, Ohio	1809	16,431
Ohio University	Bobcats	Athens, Ohio	1804	20,716
West Division
Ball State University	Cardinals	Muncie, Indiana	1918	19,849
Central Michigan University	Chippewas	Mount Pleasant, Michigan	1892	27,354
Eastern Michigan University	Eagles	Ypsilanti, Michigan	1849	20,688
Northern Illinois University	Huskies	DeKalb, Illinois	1895	24,397
University of Toledo	Rockets	Toledo, Ohio	1872	22,336
Western Michigan University	Broncos	Kalamazoo, Michigan	1903	24,818

=== Affiliate membership ===
Along with the 12 full members, there are five other schools who hold an Affiliate Membership with the Mid-American Conference. Affiliate Membership allows the team to participate in one sport within the conference.

Institution	Nickname	Location	Founded	Affiliation	Enrollment	Sport
Chicago State University	Cougars	Chicago, Illinois	1867	Public	7,131	Men's tennis
University of Evansville	Purple Aces	Evansville, Indiana	1854	Private	3,050	Men's swimming
Florida Atlantic University	Owls	Boca Raton, Florida	1961	Public	26,245	Men's soccer
Hartwick College	Hawks	Oneonta, New York	1797	Private	1,520	Men's soccer
Missouri State University	Lady Bears, Bears	Springfield, Missouri	1905	Public	21,425	Field hockey, men's swimming
Southern Illinois University Carbondale	Salukis	Carbondale, Illinois	1869	Public	21,000	Men's swimming
Temple University	Owls	Philadelphia, Pennsylvania	1884	Public	34,218	Football

== Awards ==
=== Reese Trophy ===
The Reese Trophy is named after the first Mid-American Conference Commissioner David Reese. Reese was the first commissioner of the conference from 1946 until 1964. Only full members of the Mid-American Conference are eligible for the Reese and Jacoby Trophies. Schools receive points based on their final finish in ten of the 11 men's sports. Schools must choose to count either indoor track and field or outdoor track and field. Both cannot be used in the calculation. The winner is determined by the highest average score.

Institution	BB	MBB	MXC	FB	Golf	MSC	MSW	MT	ITF	OTF	WR	No.	Total	Avg.
Kent State	–	13	12 1/2	7 1/2	12 1/2	–	–	–	~~7~~	8	10	6	63 1/2	10.58
Central Michigan	–	9 1/2	9	13	–	–	–	–	~~2~~	4	12	5	47 1/2	9.50
Akron	–	12	2 1/2	3 1/2	9	12	–	–	~~9~~	10	–	6	49	8.17
Eastern Michigan	–	6 1/2	11 1/2	1	11 1/2	–	12	–	12	~~12~~	2	7	56 1/2	8.07
Western Michigan	–	6 1/2	–	7 1/2	–	9	–	8	–	–	–	4	31	7.75
Buffalo	–	9 1/2	7	5 1/2	–	3	11	12	~~4~~	6	6	8	60	7.50
Ohio	–	4 1/2	6	11 1/2	7	–	–	–	–	–	8	5	37	7.40
Miami	–	9 1/2	8	2	8	–	7	–	–	–	–	5	34 1/2	6.90
Ball State	–	6 1/2	–	3 1/2	2 1/2	–	3	10	–	–	–	5	25 1/2	5.10
NIU	–	2 3/4	–	9	6	7	–	4	–	2	4	7	34 3/4	4.96
Toledo	–	1	5	5 1/2	5	–	–	6	–	–	–	5	22 1/2	4.50
Bowling Green	–	2 3/4	1	10	1	5	–	–	–	–	–	5	19 3/4	3.95
Temple *	–	–	–	11 1/2	–	–	–	–	–	–	–	1	11 1/2	11.50
Hartwick *	–	–	–	–	–	11	–	–	–	–	–	1	11	11.00
Missouri State *	–	–	–	–	–	–	9	–	–	–	–	1	9	9.00
Southern Illinois *	–	–	–	–	–	–	5	–	–	–	–	1	5	5.00
Chicago State *	–	–	–	–	–	–	–	2	–	–	–	1	2	2.00
Evansville *	–	–	–	–	–	–	2	–	–	–	–	1	2	2.00
Florida Atlantic *	–	–	–	–	–	2	–	–	–	–	–	1	2	2.00

* Affiliate status only. Does not qualify for trophy.

Legend – BB: Baseball; MBB: Men's basketball; XC: Men's cross country; FB: Football; MSC: Men's soccer; MSW: Men's swimming; MT: Men's tennis; ITF: Indoor track and field; OTF: Outdoor track and field; WR: Wrestling

=== Jacoby Trophy ===
The Jacoby Trophy is awarded to the best women's athletic program in the conference. It is named after Fred Jacoby, commissioner from 1971 until 1982, who incorporated women's athletics into the league's structure. Along with the Reese trophy, only full members are eligible and schools may only count Indoor or Outdoor Track and field.

Institution	WBB	WXC	FH	Golf	Gym	SB	WSC	WSW	WT	ITF	OTF	VB	No.	Total	Avg.
Kent State	11 1/4	8 1/2	11	12 1/2	11	–	6	–	–	13	–	6	8	79.25	9.91
Central Michigan	7 1/2	9 1/2	6	–	12	–	13	–	–	12	–	8 1/2	7	68 1/2	9.79
Miami	5 1/2	13	8	–	–	–	7 1/2	11	12 1/2	9 1/2	–	10 1/2	8	77 1/2	9.69
Toledo	11 1/4	12	–	9	–	–	9	12 1/2	8	5 1/2	–	8 1/2	8	75 3/4	9.47
Akron	9	10 1/2	–	7	–	–	10 1/2	5 1/2	11 1/2	7 1/2	–	3 1/2	8	65	8.13
Ohio	3 1/3	5	11	5	–	–	9	9	–	4 1/2	–	13	8	59 5/6	7.48
Eastern Michigan	9	7 1/2	–	8	9	–	12	8	5 1/2	8 1/2	–	1	9	68 1/2	7.61
Western Michigan	3 1/3	3 1/2	–	6	3	–	6	–	9	10 1/2	–	12	8	53 1/3	6.67
Ball State	6 1/2	2	4	11 1/2	5	–	4	1 1/2	1 3/4	3 1/2	–	6	10	45.75	4.58
Bowling Green	13	6 1/2	–	2 1/2	2	–	1 1/2	3	5 1/2	2	–	2	9	38	4.22
Buffalo	1	1	–	–	–	–	4	5 1/2	7	6 1/2	–	4 1/2	7	29 1/2	4.21
NIU	3 1/3	5	–	1	7	–	1 1/2	–	1 3/4	1	–	8 1/2	8	29 1/12	3.64
Missouri State *	–	–	2	–	–	–	–	–	–	–	–	–	1	2	2.00

* Affiliate status only. Does not qualify for trophy.

Legend – WBB: Women's Basketball; WXC: Women's Cross country; FH: Field hockey; Gym: Gymnastics; SB: Softball; WSC: Women's Soccer; WSW: Women's Swimming; WT: Women's Tennis; ITF: Indoor track and field; OTF: Outdoor Track and field; VB: Volleyball

=== Player of the Week ===
The conference announces a Player of the Week in all of their sports. In most of them, there is only one player announced. However, in some situations (particularly in football), there will be multiple players announced. The award is given to those that show exceptional talent on and off the field for that week.

== Sports ==
=== Cross country ===
On August 25, the Mid-American Conference announced the preseason favorites for the 2009 Cross Country season. On the men's side, Kent State returns five athletes from the 2008 MAC Championship third place squad. After them is Miami, who is also tapped to repeat as the women's MAC Champions. The rest of the teams are listed below:

Men's preseason rankings	Women's preseason rankings
1. Kent State	1. Miami
2. Miami	2. Akron
3. Central Michigan	3. Ohio
4. Eastern Michigan	4. Toledo
5. Buffalo	5. Kent State
6. Ohio	6. Central Michigan
7. Akron	7. Eastern Michigan
8. Toledo	8. Bowling Green
9. Bowling Green	9. Western Michigan
	10. Buffalo
	11. Ball State
	12. NIU

The season began on August 31, when Ball State competed in the Ball State Invitational. The Mid-American Conference Championship was held in Athens, Ohio on October 31, with the NCAA Great Lakes Regional Championship held on November 14 at Indiana University and the National Championships held on November 23 at Indiana State University.

==== Championships ====
The following are the results of the 2009 Men's Cross Country Championships:

1. Kent State, 30 points
2. Eastern Michigan, 55
3. Central Michigan, 59
4. Miami, 95
5. Buffalo, 147
6. Ohio, 182
7. Toledo, 184
8. Akron, 197
9. Bowling Green, 283

The following are the results of the 2009 Women's Cross Country Championships:

1. Miami, 44 points
2. Toledo, 63
3. Akron, 104
4. Central Michigan, 116
5. Kent State, 143
6. Eastern Michigan, 157
7. Bowling Green, 212
8. NIU, 218
8. Ohio, 218
10. Western Michigan, 250
11. Ball State, 269
12. Buffalo, 317

=== Field hockey ===
Along with the Men's Cross Country Championship, the Kent State field hockey team was selected during the preseason to win the MAC Championship, in a vote by the league's head coaches. Kent State lived up to that expectation in their first game, winning by a score of 7–0 against Saint Louis. Miami was selected to finish second, after returning nine letterwinners from the 2008 season. Following them are Ohio, Central Michigan, Ball State, and affiliate member Missouri State.

=== Football ===
The football season began on September 3 as three MAC teams played out-of-conference matches.

In previous seasons, the winner of the Mid-American Conference Championship Game would play in the Motor City Bowl. However, due to financial troubles in sponsors such as General Motors and Ford, the game began to be sponsored by Little Caesars. The 2009 Little Caesars Pizza Bowl was held on December 26 at 1:00 p.m.

The preseason rankings by MAC coaches have Central Michigan winning the MAC West and Buffalo winning the MAC East, with Central Michigan winning the MAC Championship game.

=== Gymnastics ===
MAC Championship results:

1. Central Michigan, 195.600 points
2. Kent State, 195.025
3. Eastern Michigan, 193.625
4. NIU, 193.200
5. Ball State, 193.100
6. Western Michigan, 192.875
7. Bowling Green, 191.850

=== Soccer ===
==== Men's ====
The 2009 Men's soccer season began on September 1 when Bowling Green faced Marshall and came victorious with a 2–0 win. The Akron Zips were unanimously selected as the preseason league and tournament favorite, which was followed by their #3 preseason ranking in the NSCAA polls. The Zips were also ranked second in the country according to Soccer America.

==== Women's ====
On the women's side, Toledo was selected as the preseason favorite for both the regular season and the tournament. Their season began on August 21 when Kent State defeated Eastern Kentucky by a margin of 2–1.

=== Swimming ===
==== Men's MAC Championship ====
1. Eastern Michigan, 773 points
2. Buffalo, 613 1/2
3. Missouri State, 587
4. Miami, 574 1/2
5. Southern Illinois, 478
6. Ball State, 231 1/2
7. Evansville, 136 1/2

==== Women's MAC Championship ====
1. Toledo, 670 1/2 points
2. Miami, 572
3. Ohio, 527
4. Eastern Michigan, 453 1/2
5. Akron, 392
5. Buffalo, 392
7. Bowling Green, 241
8. Ball State, 166

=== Track and field ===
==== Men's indoor ====
1. Eastern Michigan, 171 points
2. Akron, 120
3. Kent, 113
4. Buffalo, 72
5. Central Michigan, 49

==== Women's indoor ====
1. Kent State, 107 points
2. Central Michigan, 100
3. Western Michigan, 92
4. Miami, 79 1/2
5. Eastern Michigan, 75
6. Akron, 61
7. Buffalo, 46
8. Toledo, 44
9. Ohio, 26 1/2
10. Ball State, 25
11. Bowling Green, 6
12. NIU, 1

=== Volleyball ===
For the second consecutive year, Western Michigan was tabbed as the preseason favorite in the regular season as well as the MAC 2008 tournament. Soon thereafter, they followed up by receiving votes in the American Volleyball Coaches Association preseason poll. The 2009 MAC Championship was held in Toledo, Ohio from November 17 through November 22.

=== Wrestling ===
1. Central Michigan, 94 points
2. Kent State, 73
3. Ohio, 62
4. Buffalo, 60 1/2
5. NIU, 24 1/2
6. Eastern Michigan, 18
