= Ypsilanti Community Schools =

School district in Michigan

Address
- 1885 Packard Road Ypsilanti, Washtenaw, Michigan, 48197; United States

District information
- Type: Public
- Grades: PreK–12
- Superintendent: Dr. Alena Zachery-Ross
- Schools: 12
- Budget: $83,263,000 Operating expenditures 2022-2023
- NCES District ID: 2636630

Students and staff
- Students: 3,872 (2024–2025)
- Teachers: 285.25 (on an FTE basis) (2024-2025)
- Staff: 701.34 (on an FTE basis) (2024-2025)
- Student–teacher ratio: 13.57 (2024-2025)

Other information
- Website: www.ycschools.us

Ypsilanti Community Schools is a public school district in Washtenaw County, Michigan. It serves Ypsilanti and parts of Superior Township and Ypsilanti Township. The district has four magnet schools that feature STEM and International Baccalaureate curriculums.

== History ==
The district was formed on July 1, 2013, by the merger of the Ypsilanti Public School District and the Willow Run School District. Experts in K-12 education along with university, business, and parent partners assisted in the development of the district.

The first public schools in Ypsilanti date to 1840 and 1844. A Union School was built in 1858, and destroyed by fire in 1877. A new high school was built in 1879 on the northwest corner of Cross and Washington Streets, which featured a 100-foot bell tower.

During the 19th Century, Ypsilanti was unique in Michigan for having a large African American population. It was centered in the First Ward, near the corner of Adams and Buffalo Streets. The First Ward School, at 407 S. Adams Street, was one of many ward schools in the city, built in 1864. The school was exclusively for Black students up to grade six, at which point they attended integrated schools. As the city's new high school was under construction in 1917, the First Ward School was considered dilapidated, was heated by an indoor stove the students called 'Smokey,' and had an outhouse for a restroom. In 1918, Black leaders in the city won a lawsuit to close the segregated school.

In 1917, Ypsilanti High School was built on Court Street between Washington and Adams Streets, the site of the old high school (which was torn down in 1929). The Arts and Crafts Building, an addition along Adams Street, was built in 1951. The building was used as the high school until 1973. It was sold by the district in 1997 and became senior housing.

Ypsilanti's Harriet School had the first Black principal in Michigan, Charles "Chief" Eugene Beatty Sr., in 1940.

Willow Run High School was built in 1955 and rebuilt on the same site in 1985. It was expanded in 2004 to include a middle school and a new pool. It became Ypsilanti Community Middle School with the merger of the school districts.

Ypsilanti Community High School opened in fall 1973. The former Ypsilanti High School became a middle school when the present high school opened.

== Schools ==
Schools in Ypsilanti Community Schools district
School	Address	Notes
Ypsilanti Community High School	2095 Packard Rd., Ypsilanti	Grades 9-12. Built 1973.
Ypsilanti Community Middle School	235 Spencer Lane, Ypsilanti	Grades 6-8
Ypsilanti A.C.C.E. Program	1076 Ecorse Rd., Ypsilanti	Achieving College and Career Education. Grades 9-12. Housed at George School
YPSI Connected Community School	1076 Ecorse, Ypsilanti	Grades K-8. Online school/distance learning headquartered at George School.
Ypsilanti International Elementary School	503 Oak St., Ypsilanti	Grades K-5. Application-based International Baccalaureate Primary Years Programme (IB PYP).
Erickson Elementary	1427 Levona, Ypsilanti	Grades 1-5
Holmes STEAM Elementary	1255 Holmes Rd., Ypsilanti	Magnet school, Grades 2-5
Estabrook Elementary	1555 W. Cross St., Ypsilanti	Grades 2-5
Beatty Early Learning Center	1661 LeForge Rd., Ypsilanti	Preschool
Ford STEAM Early Learning Center	2440 Clark Rd., Ypsilanti	Grades PreK-1
Perry Early Learning Center	550 Perry St., Ypsilanti	Grades PreK-1
