= Willow Run Community Schools =

School district in Michigan, United States

The Willow Run Community Schools (WRCS) was a school district in Washtenaw County, Michigan, serving portions of Superior Township and Ypsilanti Township. It was the sole political entity entirely of the "Willow Run" community. The district headquarters was in Ypsilanti Township.

The full official name was School District Number 1, Fractional, Ypsilanti Township, Willow Run, Michigan. The "fractional" referred to the district having territory in portions of two townships.

== History ==
The district was originally known as the Spencer School District. In the 1940s the district had one school; at that time officials from the federal government of the United States asked the Ypsilanti City School District to annex the Willow Run area, which included the Spencer district. A referendum was held for voters in the Spencer School District, and Spencer voters rejected the measure on a 3-1 basis despite messages of support for the merger from the Spencer school district parent teacher organization (PTA) and other area leaders. The district later changed its name to Willow Run Community Schools. It also annexed the territory that included planned sites for three elementary schools to be constructed by the U.S. federal government.

It held its final classes on Friday June 7, 2013. On July 1, 2013, it merged with Ypsilanti Public Schools to form Ypsilanti Community Schools.

== Demographics ==
- The district had 4,303 students (60% white, 36% African-American - 41.7% free and reduced lunch) in the 1991-1992 school year, making it the third largest school district in Washtenaw County.

== Schools ==
- Willow Run High School
- Edmonson Middle School
- Cheney Elementary
- Ford Elementary
- Holmes Elementary
- Kaiser Elementary
- Kettering Elementary
- Thurston Early Childhood Development Center
