= Ovation (American TV channel) =

American cable television channel

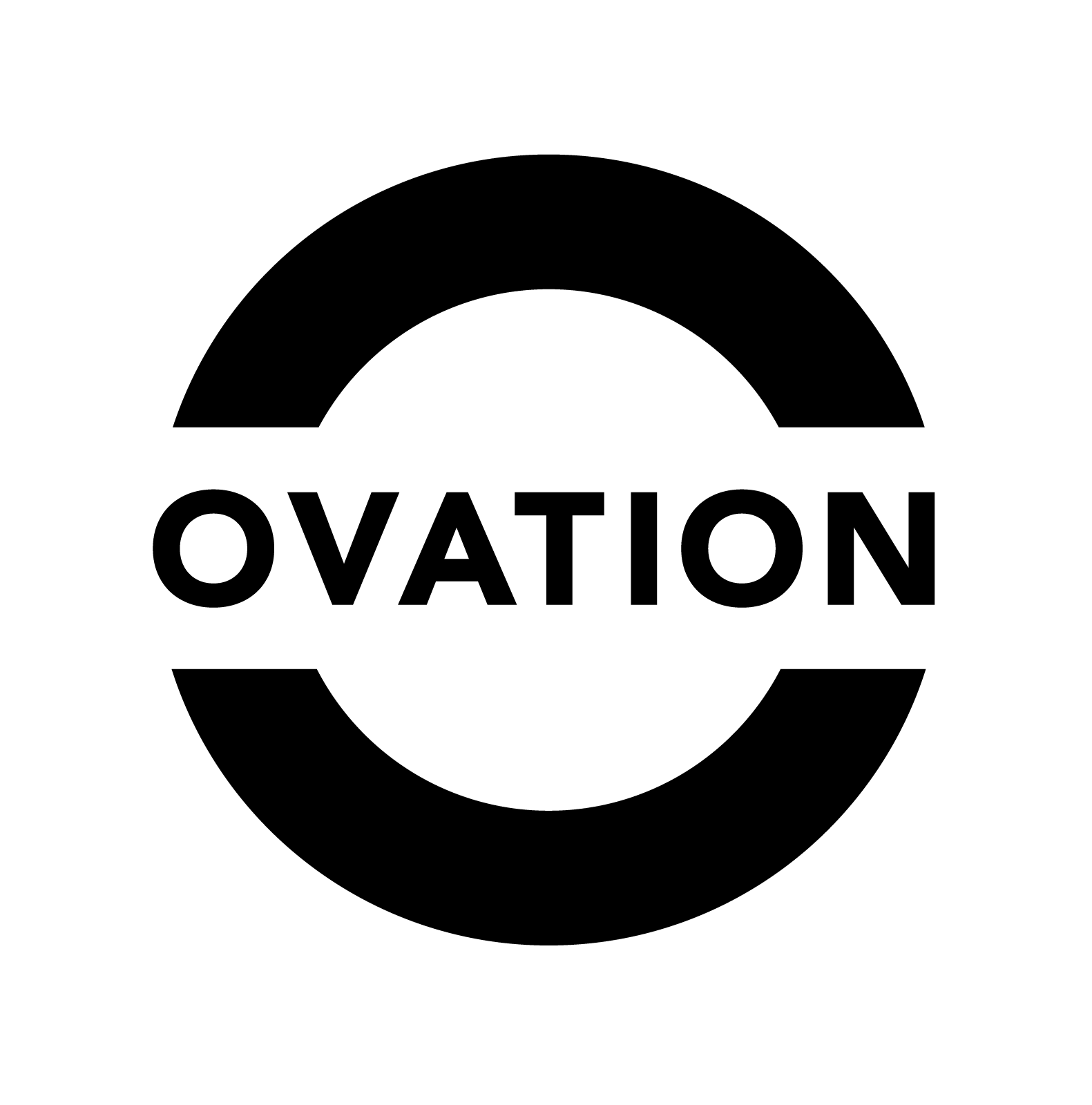
- Country: United States
- Broadcast area: Nationwide

Programming
- Picture format: 1080i (HDTV)

Ownership
- Owner: Ovation LLC (see lede for further ownership details) (operated by Hubbard Broadcasting)
- Sister channels: Reelz

History
- Launched: April 21, 1996; 30 years ago

Links
- Website: ovationtv.com

Ovation is an American television network whose focus is on the fine arts and contemporary culture. The network is owned by Ovation LLC, which is made up of a joint venture of Hubbard Media Group and the private-equity funds Corporate Partners II, Arcadia Investment Partners, and Perry Capital.

As of November 2023, Ovation is available to approximately 24,000,000 pay television households in the United States, down from its 2015 peak of 54,000,000 households.

== History ==
The channel was launched in 1996, mainly with spread-out coverage throughout the country and no satellite carriage, with its major coverage with the urban base of Time Warner Cable. Under this form, its carriage was limited, as cable providers did not see much popularity or requests for the arts-based network, as had been seen in the past with networks like CBS Cable or former arts networks that went for a more broad-based focus, including Bravo and A&E.

On August 30, 2006, the network's assets were purchased by a consortium made up of the Hubbard family and The Weinstein Company. In June 2007, the network was re-launched, coinciding with its addition by DirecTV, which gave the channel full national coverage. In 2008, Ovation also became available on Dish. With the relaunch, Ovation TV claimed an "energetic" new look and a new primetime schedule revolving around "genre nights" dedicated to performance, people, and film. "TV" was dropped from its branding on March 1, 2010. The network launched in high definition in July 2010, utilizing the 1080i format.

The network's investment by The Weinstein Company would come into question in October 2017, when Harvey Weinstein's sexual assault and abuse allegations came to light. Two weeks after the first public reports, the network's board notified Harvey Weinstein on October 24 that he would be expelled from any further involvement in Ovation. Shortly after, TWC's interest in the network was fully terminated, saving Ovation LLC from the legal battle to come with TWC's bankruptcy.

== Carriage ==
On December 18, 2012, Time Warner Cable announced plans to remove Ovation from its own systems as well as those operated by Bright House Networks (whose carriage agreements were negotiated by Time Warner). Time Warner Cable and Bright House Networks dropped Ovation at midnight Eastern Time on December 31, 2012. The two providers later reached an agreement to resume carriage of Ovation on October 16, 2013, reinstating the channel on TWC and BHN systems on January 1, 2014.
