= Harris Fletcher =

American academic

- Born: October 23, 1892; Ypsilanti, Michigan, U.S.
- Died: July 15, 1979 (aged 86); Champaign, Illinois, U.S.
- Education: University of Michigan
- Occupations: Academic, author, and authority on the work of John Milton

Harris Francis Fletcher (23 October 1892 – July 1979) was an American academic, professor of English at the University of Illinois for 36 years from 1926 to 1962, an author, and a leading authority on the work of John Milton.

== Early life ==
He was born in Ypsilanti, Michigan. Fletcher received his Ph.D. from the University of Michigan in 1925.

== Career ==
Fletcher was Professor of English at the University of Illinois from 1926 to 1962, and Associate Dean of Liberal Arts and Sciences from 1931 to 1938. Fletcher played a major role in the establishment of the university's Rare Book and Special Collections Library, which now include the largest collection of the works of the poet John Milton in the United States. He died in Champaign, Illinois in 1979.

== Selected publications ==
- John Milton's Complete Poetical Works (1943)
- Milton's Semitic studies and some manifestations of them in his poetry
- Milton's rabbinical readings
- The use of the Bible in Milton's prose
- The intellectual Development of John Milton (two volumes, 1956, 1961)
- Contributions to a Milton bibliography, 1800–1930, being a list of addenda to Stevens's Reference guide to Milton

== Personal life ==
On July 8, 1915, he married Mary Ellen Davis in Ypsilanti, Michigan. Mary Ellen Davis died of influenza in the flu pandemic October 20, 1918. On 22 June 1922, he married Dorothy Bacon in Coldwater, Michigan.
