= National Register of Historic Places listings in Washtenaw County, Michigan =

Location of Washtenaw County in Michigan

List of Registered Historic Places in Washtenaw County, Michigan.

This National Park Service list is complete through NPS recent listings posted August 21, 2026.

	Name on the Register	Image	Date listed	Location	City or town	Description
1	William Anderson House	William Anderson House	August 19, 1982 (#82002884)	2301 Packard Rd. 42°15′16″N 83°43′30″W	Ann Arbor	Built in c. 1853 and significant for fine details of its Greek Revival styling, although it also has elements more common to the Gothic Revival. Home of Washtenaw's first sheriff (1835-39).
2	Ann Arbor Central Fire Station	Ann Arbor Central Fire Station	January 13, 1972 (#72000658)	Corner of 5th Ave. and Huron St. 42°16′54″N 83°44′47″W	Ann Arbor	Now occupied by the Ann Arbor Hands-On Museum
3	Joseph Annin House	Joseph Annin House	October 10, 1985 (#85002952)	218 Monroe St. 42°09′42″N 83°47′04″W	Saline	
4	Bell Road Bridge	Bell Road Bridge	November 29, 1996 (#96001380)	Bell Rd. at the Huron River, Dexter Township; 42°24′05″N 83°54′32″W	Pinckney	The Bell Road Bridge is a Pratt through truss bridge built in 1891 by the Wrought Iron Bridge Company of Canton, Ohio. The bridge is assembled with iron connecting pins, a method unique to the nineteenth century. The bridge carried Bell Road over the Huron River until 1997, when it was removed from its abutments and placed on the southeastern riverbank.
5	Bell-Spalding House	Bell-Spalding House	December 28, 1990 (#90001957)	2117 Washtenaw Ave. 42°15′55″N 83°43′05″W	Ann Arbor	
6	Henry Bennett House	Henry Bennett House	March 1, 1973 (#73000959)	312 S. Division St. 42°16′44″N 83°44′40″W	Ann Arbor	Now operated as the Kempf House Museum
7	Bessert-Ryan House		November 18, 2025 (#100012314)	7441 Spencer Rd. 42°23′28″N 83°43′25″W	Northfield Township	Part of the Historic and Architectural Resources of Northfield Township, Washtenaw County, Michigan MPS.
8	Brinkerhoff–Becker House	Brinkerhoff–Becker House	July 8, 1982 (#82002890)	601 W. Forest Ave. 42°14′51″N 83°37′15″W	Ypsilanti	The Brinkerhoff-Becker House, also known as the Becker-Stachlewitz House, was built as a private home in 1863-69. Charles J. Becker purchased the house in 1889, and remodelled it in 1891 to include the prominent helmet-domed tower. It has been remodeled into apartments, and is currently owned by Eastern Michigan University.
9	Chelsea Commercial Historic District	Chelsea Commercial Historic District	February 22, 2011 (#11000046)	Main St. and adjacent sections of Middle, Park, Jackson, East, and Orchard Sts. 42°19′05″N 84°01′13″W	Chelsea	The Chelsea Commercial Historic District contains 61 contributing structures on or near Main Street in Chelsea. Most are commercial buildings, but also included are several churches, the prominent Glazier Stove Company Warehouse and Clocktower Building and nearby Welfare Building, and the McKune Memorial Library (originally a mid-19th century private home).
10	Zalmon Church House	Zalmon Church House	October 10, 1985 (#85002966)	113 N. Ann Arbor; 42°10′02″N 83°46′55″W	Saline	
11	William H. Davenport House	William H. Davenport House	March 3, 1975 (#75000964)	300 E. Michigan Ave. 42°10′11″N 83°46′31″W	Saline	
12	Delhi Bridge	Delhi Bridge	September 4, 2008 (#08000844)	E. Delhi Rd. over Huron River; 42°20′01″N 83°48′33″W	Scio	The Delhi Bridge is a one-lane wrought iron Pratt through truss bridge built in 1888. It was heavily damaged by a tornado in 1917, and rebuilt in 1918. It was extensively renovated in 2008-2009, and remains in use by vehicular traffic.
13	Delta Upsilon Fraternity House	Delta Upsilon Fraternity House	November 29, 1995 (#95001394)	1331 Hill St. 42°16′20″N 83°43′56″W	Ann Arbor	
14	Detroit Observatory	Detroit Observatory	September 20, 1973 (#73000960)	Observatory and Ann Sts. 42°16′54″N 83°43′54″W	Ann Arbor	The Detroit Observatory was built in 1854, and was the first scientific research facility at the University of Michigan and the oldest observatory of its type in the nation. The building housed a 12⅝-inch (32 cm) Henry Fitz, Jr. refracting telescope, the third largest telescope in the world when it was installed in 1857. Numerous notable astronomers worked or trained at the site, including Franz Brünnow, Cleveland Abbe, James Craig Watson, Asaph Hall, Otto Julius Klotz, Robert Simpson Woodward, and John Martin Schaeberle.
15	Detroit, Hillsdale and Indiana Railroad-Saline Depot	Detroit, Hillsdale and Indiana Railroad-Saline Depot	June 17, 1994 (#94000619)	402 N. Ann Arbor St. 42°10′18″N 83°47′00″W	Saline	
16	Nathan B. Devereaux Octagon House	Nathan B. Devereaux Octagon House	April 2, 2003 (#03000177)	66425 Eight Mile Rd. 42°25′46″N 83°41′56″W	Northfield Township	The Nathan B. Devereaux Octagon House is one of only three extant octagonal houses in Washtenaw County, and remains in excellent and near original condition. It was built in 1864 after Nathan B. Devereaux attended an Ann Arbor lecture by Orson Squire Fowler, the leading proponent of octagonal houses.
17	Dixboro United Methodist Church	Dixboro United Methodist Church	March 16, 1972 (#72000665)	5221 Church St. 42°18′48″N 83°39′21″W	Dixboro	The Dixboro United Methodist Church was built in 1857 from a design by Ypsilanti architect Abraham Cooper. It is significant as a nearly unaltered example of a mid-19th century Greek Revival style church designed by a professional architect.
18	Thomas Earl House	Thomas Earl House	June 25, 1992 (#91002000)	415 N. Main St. 42°17′03″N 83°44′55″W	Ann Arbor	
19	East Michigan Avenue Historic District	East Michigan Avenue Historic District	October 10, 1985 (#85002953)	300-321 E. Michigan Ave., 99-103 Maple St., and 217, 300 and 302 E. Henry; 42°10′09″N 83°46′32″W	Saline	
20	Eastern Michigan University Historic District	Eastern Michigan University Historic District	October 4, 1984 (#84000017)	Cross St., Washtenaw and Forest Aves. 42°14′47″N 83°37′29″W	Ypsilanti	The Eastern Michigan University Historic District contains four buildings: Welch Hall, Starkweather hall, Sherzer Hall, and McKenny Hall, set on an L-shaped parcel of land on the very south end of the Eastern Michigan University campus. The four buildings are all substantial structures, and each has a unique style and structure design.
21	First National Bank Building	First National Bank Building	November 24, 1982 (#82000547)	201 S. Main St. 42°16′48″N 83°44′54″W	Ann Arbor	The First National Bank Building is a ten-story Romanesque Revival high-rise was built in 1927, and completed in 1929. It was the tallest building in Ann Arbor at the time of its construction, it was built for the first bank in Washtenaw County.
22	Jortin Forbes House	Jortin Forbes House	October 10, 1985 (#85002954)	211 N. Ann Arbor St. 42°10′05″N 83°46′57″W	Saline	
23	Fountain-Bessac House	Fountain-Bessac House	September 29, 1988 (#88001833)	102 W. Main St. 42°08′58″N 84°02′26″W	Manchester	The Fountain-Bessac House was bit in two stages. In 1842, Jacob Fountain built what is now the first floor in a Greek Revival style. Fountain later sold the house to Dr. William Bessac, who, in 1853, added the second floor, built in an Italian Villa style. The stepped configuration of the first floor, second floor, and crowning cupola has drawn comparisons to a wedding cake.
24	Friend-Hack House	Friend-Hack House	April 25, 1991 (#91000441)	775 County St. 42°05′05″N 83°40′15″W	Milan	The Friend-Hack House, also known as the Hack House, is a Stick / Eastlake style house built in 1888 for Olive Friend, widow of Professor Henry Friend. The couple had defrauded investors of hundreds of thousands of dollars in the fraudulent Electric Sugar Refining Company.
25	Henry S. Frieze House	Henry S. Frieze House	November 15, 1972 (#72000659)	1547 Washtenaw Ave. 42°16′22″N 83°43′41″W	Ann Arbor	
26	German Park Recreation Club	German Park Recreation Club	November 19, 2025 (#100012313)	5549 Pontiac Trail; 42°21′29″N 83°40′38″W	Northfield Township	Part of the Historic and Architectural Resources of Northfield Township, Washtenaw County, Michigan MPS.
27	Germania Building Complex	Germania Building Complex	March 10, 1983 (#83000893)	119-123 W. Washington St. and 209-211 Ashley St. 42°16′49″N 83°44′58″W	Ann Arbor	
28	Goodyear Block	Goodyear Block	August 5, 1993 (#93000770)	138 E. Main St. 42°09′00″N 84°02′21″W	Manchester	The Goodyear Block, also known as the Arbeiter Block, is a commercial building built in 1867 by Chauncey Walbridge for Henry Goodyear. The third-floor auditorium of the building was used for dances, plays, commencements, and concerts, all of which contributed to making downtown Manchester the social center of the area.
29	Gordon Hall	Gordon Hall	November 9, 1972 (#72000664)	8347 Island Lake Rd. 42°20′25″N 83°53′55″W	Dexter	Gordon Hall was built by Judge Samuel W. Dexter House, the founder of Dexter and an early Michigan land baron, in 1841-43. It was almost certainly used as a stop on the Underground Railroad, and was later purchased by Judge Dexter's granddaughter, pioneering research scientist and suffragist Katherine Dexter McCormick. It is currently being restored by the Dexter Area Historical Society and Museum. The house is unique in Michigan for its balance, large scale, and massive hexastyle portico.
30	Arnold and Gertrude Goss House	Arnold and Gertrude Goss House	May 17, 2006 (#06000402)	3215 W. Dobson Place; 42°17′26″N 83°41′56″W	Ann Arbor	
31	Groves Farm	Groves Farm	December 26, 2023 (#100009651)	6015 Sutton Road; 42°21′56″N 83°42′09″W	Northfield Township	
32	Charles Guthard House	Charles Guthard House	October 10, 1985 (#85002955)	211 E. Michigan Ave. 42°10′07″N 83°46′41″W	Saline	
33	Harris Hall	Harris Hall	April 22, 1982 (#82002885)	617 East Huron St. 42°16′53″N 83°44′28″W	Ann Arbor	
34	Highland Cemetery	Highland Cemetery	March 4, 2020 (#100005026)	943 North River St. 42°15′26″N 83°36′37″W	Ypsilanti	
35	Jacob Hoffstetter House	Jacob Hoffstetter House	March 19, 1982 (#82002886)	322 E. Washington St. 42°16′48″N 83°44′42″W	Ann Arbor	
36	Kellogg-Warden House	Kellogg-Warden House	July 22, 1994 (#94000754)	500 N. Main St. 42°17′06″N 83°44′53″W	Ann Arbor	
37	Joshua G. and Nancy (Bly) Leland House	Joshua G. and Nancy (Bly) Leland House	November 18, 2025 (#100012316)	3850 East North Territorial Rd. 42°22′00″N 83°41′10″W	Northfield Township	Part of the Historic and Architectural Resources of Northfield Township, Washtenaw County, Michigan MPS.
38	Ladies' Literary Club Building	Ladies' Literary Club Building	March 16, 1972 (#72000666)	218 N. Washington St. 42°14′40″N 83°36′51″W	Ypsilanti	The Ladies' Literary Club Building was built in approximately 1843 as a home for William M. Davis, probably by Arden H. Ballard House. The house remained in private hands until 1912, when it was purchased by the Ladies' Literary Club as a meeting house. As of 2013, the Club still owns the building.
39	James Litchfield House	James Litchfield House	December 27, 1984 (#84000567)	3512 Central St. 42°20′20″N 83°52′55″W	Dexter	The Litchfield House, completed in 1850, is a Greek Revival style house with a central two-story mass flanked by single-story wings.
40	George R. Lutz House	George R. Lutz House	October 10, 1985 (#85002956)	103 W. Henry St. 42°09′54″N 83°46′53″W	Saline	
41	Main Street Historic District	Main Street Historic District	April 14, 1999 (#99000434)	3-153 E. Main, 1-41 W. Main, and 8 Park Lane; 42°05′05″N 83°41′01″W	Milan	The Main Street Historic District is a commercial historic district that includes structures originally built as a hotel, city hall/fire station, post office, church, hospital, meeting hall, and theatre. Although within Milan, the district spans the county line between Washtenaw County, Michigan and Monroe County, Michigan, containing structures within both counties. For that reason, it is also listed on the NRHP listings in Monroe County article.
42	Main Street Post Office	Main Street Post Office	May 22, 1978 (#78001512)	220 N. Main St. 42°16′58″N 83°44′53″W	Ann Arbor	
43	Floyd R. Mechem House	Floyd R. Mechem House	December 9, 1999 (#99001456)	1402 Hill St. 42°16′19″N 83°43′53″W	Ann Arbor	
44	Robert C. and Bettie J. (Sponseller) Metcalf House	Robert C. and Bettie J. (Sponseller) Metcalf House	December 27, 2016 (#16000910)	1052 Arlington Blvd. 42°16′08″N 83°42′31″W	Ann Arbor	
45	Methodist Episcopal Church Parsonage	Methodist Episcopal Church Parsonage	March 18, 1982 (#82002887)	332 E. Washington St. 42°16′48″N 83°44′41″W	Ann Arbor	
46	Michigan Central Railroad Chelsea Depot	Michigan Central Railroad Chelsea Depot	June 12, 1987 (#87000915)	150 Jackson St. 42°19′09″N 84°01′11″W	Chelsea	The Michigan Central Railroad Chelsea Depot is a Stick style Victorian structure with multiple gables and gingerbread decoration. It was designed by the Detroit architectural firm of Mason and Rice in 1880, and was used for passenger service until 1981.
47	Michigan Central Railroad Depot	Michigan Central Railroad Depot	March 10, 1975 (#75000963)	401 Depot St. 42°17′14″N 83°44′32″W	Ann Arbor	Now occupied by the Gandy Dancer restaurant
48	Michigan Theater Building	Michigan Theater Building	November 28, 1980 (#80001917)	521-109 E. Liberty St. 42°16′46″N 83°44′31″W	Ann Arbor	The Michigan Theater is a movie palace designed by Detroit-based architect Maurice Finkel and built in 1928. The theater seats 1700 and features the theater's original 1927 Barton Theatre Pipe Organ, orchestra pit, stage, and elaborate architectural details.
49	Miller-Walker House	Miller-Walker House	October 10, 1985 (#85002957)	117 McKay St. 42°10′00″N 83°47′01″W	Saline	
50	William and Elizabeth (Bodanzky) Muschenheim House	William and Elizabeth (Bodanzky) Muschenheim House	December 27, 2016 (#16000911)	1251 Heather Way; 42°16′01″N 83°42′35″W	Ann Arbor	
51	Newberry Hall	Newberry Hall	March 24, 1972 (#72000660)	434 S. State St. 42°16′36″N 83°44′28″W	Ann Arbor	
52	Nickels Arcade	Nickels Arcade	July 9, 1987 (#87001180)	326-330 S. State St. 42°16′42″N 83°44′29″W	Ann Arbor	
53	North Ann Arbor Street Historic District	North Ann Arbor Street Historic District	October 10, 1985 (#85002958)	301, 303, and 305-327 N. Ann Arbor St. 42°10′12″N 83°47′01″W	Saline	
54	Northern Brewery	Northern Brewery	November 20, 1979 (#79001170)	1327 Jones Dr. 42°17′33″N 83°44′05″W	Ann Arbor	
55	Oakwood Cemetery Mausoleum	Oakwood Cemetery Mausoleum	October 10, 1985 (#85003047)	Off Monroe St. 42°09′49″N 83°47′06″W	Saline	
56	Old West Side Historic District	Old West Side Historic District	April 14, 1972 (#72000661)	Bounded roughly by 7th, Main, and Huron Sts., Pauline Blvd., and Crest Ave. 42°16′26″N 83°45′23″W	Ann Arbor	
57	George W. Palmer House	George W. Palmer House	November 29, 1996 (#96001377)	138 E. Middle St. 42°19′05″N 84°01′08″W	Chelsea	The George W. Palmer House, also known as the Chelsea Private Hospital, was constructed in approximately 1885 for physician George W. Palmer. It was later the residence of Daniel Charles McLaren, a prominent local businessman and village president, and operated as a private hospital in the 1930s and 40s. The exceptional brick Queen Anne structure was refurbished in the 1990s.
58	William B. and Mary Shuford Palmer House	William B. and Mary Shuford Palmer House	March 29, 1999 (#99000340)	227 Orchard Hills Dr. 42°16′43″N 83°42′57″W	Ann Arbor	The William B. and Mary Shuford Palmer House is a multilevel brick and cypress late period Frank Lloyd Wright house, the plan and design of which is based on the equilateral triangle. The house is sheltered by a long broad hipped roof with deep overhangs; a cantilever extending over the terrace is the most dramatic feature of the house. The home was designed in 1952 for William Palmer, an economics professor at the University of Michigan, and his wife Mary.
59	Parker Mill Complex	Parker Mill Complex	August 4, 1982 (#82002888)	East of Ann Arbor at Geddes and Dixboro Rds. 42°16′26″N 83°40′07″W	Ann Arbor	Parker Mill is a well-preserved example of a small-scale grist mill operation that was once common in Michigan. The complex contains an 1873 grist mill and an 1887 cider mill (now part of a county park) and the Parker House (now a private residence).
60	Pease Auditorium	Pease Auditorium	October 4, 1984 (#84000018)	College Pl. 42°14′47″N 83°37′18″W	Ypsilanti	Pease Auditorium is a music venue on the campus of Eastern Michigan University. Built in 1914, Pease auditorium is the 4th oldest standing building on Eastern Michigan University's campus. The building was named after Frederic H. Pease, the professor of music from 1858 to 1909 and Head of the school's Conservatory.
61	President's House, University of Michigan	President's House, University of Michigan	October 15, 1970 (#70000285)	815 S. University, University of Michigan campus 42°16′31″N 83°44′19″W	Ann Arbor	
62	Emanuel and Elizabeth Rentschler Farmstead	Emanuel and Elizabeth Rentschler Farmstead	June 25, 2013 (#13000445)	1265 E. Michigan Ave. 42°10′35″N 83°45′39″W	Saline	This farmstead, now known as the Rentschler Farm Museum, consists of fourteen historically significant structures built primarily around the turn of the century. The land was first farmed in 1825; in 1901, the farmstead was purchased by Emanuel Rentschler. The Rentschlers continued to farm the land until the 1990s.
63	Saint John's Evangelical Lutheran Church, Parsonage, and Cemetery	Saint John's Evangelical Lutheran Church, Parsonage, and Cemetery	February 23, 2026 (#100012315)	2945 East Northfield Church Rd; 42°21′35″N 83°42′12″W	Northfield Township	Part of Historic and Architectural Resources of Northfield Township, Washtenaw County, Michigan MPS
64	Saint Mary's School	Saint Mary's School	December 13, 2010 (#10001026)	400 Congdon St. 42°18′54″N 84°01′21″W	Chelsea	Saint Mary's School was constructed in 1925, after the original building burned. The nearby parish church was dismantled in 1961, and a new one built in another location. The school stayed open until 1972. In 1998, actor and Chelsea native Jeff Daniels purchased the building from the parish and donated it to the Chelsea Center for the Development of the Arts.
65	St. Patrick's Parish Complex	St. Patrick's Parish Complex	April 23, 1982 (#82002889)	Northfield Church and Whitmore Lake Rds. 42°21′29″N 83°45′01″W	Ann Arbor	St. Patrick's Parish Complex is a historic church building, with associated rectory and cemetery. The property upon which the church now stands was purchased in 1831, and the present church was built in 1875-78. The complex is significant both because of its historical association with the early Irish Catholics in the area, and because of the architecturally important Gothic revival church.
66	Salem Methodist Episcopal Church and Salem Walker Cemetery	Salem Methodist Episcopal Church and Salem Walker Cemetery	August 18, 1992 (#92001054)	7150 Angle Rd., Salem Township; 42°24′38″N 83°37′25″W	Salem	The Salem Methodist Episcopal Church (also known as the Salem Walker Church) was built in 1864. It was used for services until 1912, after which it was abandoned. In 1931, the Salem Walker Cemetery association purchased it and began renting it for weddings and other gatherings. The nearby Salem Walker Cemetery has been used as a burial place since at least 1834. The church is significant as one of the least altered Greek Revival churches existing in the state of Michigan.
67	Saline First Presbyterian Church	Saline First Presbyterian Church	October 10, 1985 (#85002960)	143 E. Michigan Ave. 42°10′02″N 83°46′50″W	Saline	The Saline First Presbyterian Church was first organized in 1831 by group of twelve Presbyterian families from Newark, New York. The current church in a brick Romanesque Revival structure designed by Spier & Rohns and constructed in 1898.
68	Schuyler Mill – Ford Soybean Plant Complex	Schuyler Mill – Ford Soybean Plant Complex	May 8, 1996 (#96000477)	555-600 Michigan Ave. 42°09′45″N 83°47′24″W	Saline	The Schuyler Mill was originally constructed in 1845 by David Schuyler Haywood as a gristmill. However, by 1865, business declined, and the mill was soon closed. Henry Ford purchased the site in 1936 and turned into one of his small village industry factories. It opened it as a soybean processing plant in 1938. The plant was closed in 1947, and later used as an antique store and banquet facility.
69	Starkweather Religious Center	Starkweather Religious Center	April 13, 1977 (#77000724)	901 W. Forest; 42°14′47″N 83°37′27″W	Ypsilanti	Starkweather Hall, constructed in 1896, is the oldest building on the campus of Eastern Michigan University. It was constructed as a religious center for the use of the Students' Christian Association, primarily with a $10,000 bequest from philanthropist Mary Ann Starkweather.
70	Stone School	Stone School	November 29, 1995 (#95001386)	2600 Packard Rd. 42°14′49″N 83°43′10″W	Ann Arbor	
71	Louis Sturm House	Louis Sturm House	October 10, 1985 (#85002961)	100 Russell; 42°10′06″N 83°47′03″W	Saline	
72	Langford and Lydia McMichael Sutherland Farmstead	Langford and Lydia McMichael Sutherland Farmstead	May 16, 2006 (#05000711)	797 Textile Rd. 42°11′57″N 83°44′26″W	Pittsfield Charter Township	
73	Nathan Esek and Sarah Emergene Sutton House	Nathan Esek and Sarah Emergene Sutton House	January 6, 2022 (#100007208)	5145 Pontiac Trail; 42°20′52″N 83°41′54″W	Northfield Township	
74	Dr. Benajah Ticknor House	Dr. Benajah Ticknor House	November 21, 1972 (#72000662)	2781 Packard Rd. 42°14′42″N 83°42′38″W	Ann Arbor	The Benajah Ticknor House (now the Cobblestone Farm and Museum) is an 1844 cobblestone farmhouse built by Dr. Benajah Ticknor, a naval surgeon. The surrounding area was farmed from 1824 until 1955, and in 1972 the city of Ann Arbor turned it into a museum.
75	Tuomy Hills Service Station	Tuomy Hills Service Station	March 24, 2000 (#00000240)	2460 Washtenaw Ave. 42°15′34″N 83°42′44″W	Ann Arbor	The Tuomy Hills Service Station is a stone gas station reminiscent of an English gatekeeper's cottage.
76	Union Block	Union Block	October 10, 1985 (#85002962)	100-110 E. Michigan Ave. 42°09′59″N 83°46′51″W	Saline	
77	Unitarian Universalist Church	Unitarian Universalist Church	October 4, 1978 (#78001513)	100 N. State St. 42°16′53″N 83°44′26″W	Ann Arbor	The Ann Arbor Unitarian Universalist Church (also known as the First Unitarian Church) was designed by the Detroit architectural firm of Donaldson & Meier and built in 1881-2 by the Walker Brothers firm of Ann Arbor. The Unitarian congregation used the building until 1946, after which it was used by the Grace Bible Church and then the Bible Church of True Holiness. It currently houses the architecture firm of Hobbs and Black, Associates, Inc.
78	University Of Michigan Central Campus Historic District	University Of Michigan Central Campus Historic District	June 15, 1978 (#78001514)	University of Michigan campus 42°16′37″N 83°44′15″W	Ann Arbor	
79	Samuel D. Van Duzer House	Samuel D. Van Duzer House	October 10, 1985 (#85002963)	205 S. Ann Arbor St. 42°09′54″N 83°46′48″W	Saline	
80	Wallace Block-Old Saline Village Hall	Wallace Block-Old Saline Village Hall	October 10, 1985 (#85002964)	101-113 S. Ann Arbor St. 42°09′58″N 83°46′51″W	Saline	
81	Henry R. Watson House	Henry R. Watson House	October 10, 1985 (#85002965)	7215 N. Ann Arbor-Saline Rd. 42°10′50″N 83°47′13″W	Saline	
82	Weinmann Block	Weinmann Block	September 8, 1983 (#83000891)	219-223 E. Washington St. 42°16′50″N 83°44′47″W	Ann Arbor	
83	Orrin White House	Orrin White House	April 16, 1971 (#71000421)	2940 Fuller Rd. 42°16′41″N 83°42′07″W	Ann Arbor	The Orrin White House is a two-story frame house covered with cobblestones, set in a herringbone pattern on the front facade. It was between 1836 and 1840 by Orrin and Ann White, and is still used as a private residence.
84	Judge Robert S. Wilson House	Judge Robert S. Wilson House	March 16, 1972 (#72000663)	126 N. Division St. 42°16′55″N 83°44′37″W	Ann Arbor	The Judge Robert S. Wilson House, a two-story Greek Revival structure built in approximately 1839, is an outstanding specimen of classical design. The front facade boasts a full-width portico with Ionic fluted shaft columns, and an entryway framed by matching pilasters.
85	Ypsilanti Historic District	Ypsilanti Historic District	April 11, 1978 (#78001515)	Irregular pattern along Huron River with boundaries extending to Forest Ave., Grove, Buffalo, and Hamilton Sts. 42°14′36″N 83°36′41″W	Ypsilanti	The Ypsilanti Historic District contains Ypsilanti's two commercial cores along Michigan Avenue and Cross Street (Depot Town) as well as surrounding residential structures. Many buildings date to the mid-19th century. A boundary increase (added 1989-01-05) extended the district in three areas: Roughly Michigan, Summit, W. Cross, W. Forest, and Ballard; S. Adams and Woodward; Forest, Grove, Cross, and River.
86	Ypsilanti Water Works Stand Pipe	Ypsilanti Water Works Stand Pipe	October 26, 1981 (#81000318)	Summit and Cross Sts. 42°14′44″N 83°37′29″W	Ypsilanti	The Ypsilanti Water Works Stand Pipe is a historic water tower constructed in 1889 on the highest point in Ypsilanti. The tower is constructed of limestone, and is 147 feet tall with an 85 foot base. The substructure walls taper from a thickness of forty inches at the bottom to 24 inches at the top.
87	Zeeb Farm	Zeeb Farm	August 24, 2026 (#100012312)	5310-5380 Earhart Rd. 42°21′09″N 83°40′56″W	Northfield Township	Historic and Architectural Resources of Northfield Township, Washtenaw County, Michigan MPS

== See also ==
- List of Michigan State Historic Sites in Washtenaw County, Michigan
- List of National Historic Landmarks in Michigan
- National Register of Historic Places listings in Michigan
- Listings in neighboring counties: Ingham, Jackson, Lenawee, Livingston, Monroe, Oakland, Wayne
