= Bessert-Ryan House =

- U.S. National Register of Historic Places
- Interactive map
- Location: 7441 Spencer Rd., Northfield Township, Michigan
- Coordinates: 42°23′28″N 83°43′25″W
- Built: 1871
- Architectural style: Queen Anne
- NRHP reference No.: 100012314
- Added to NRHP: November 18, 2025

The Bessert-Ryan House is a historic house located at 7441 Spencer Road in Northfield Township, Michigan. It was listed on the National Register of Historic Places in 2025.

== History ==
John Ryan emigrated from Ireland to the United States around 1830. He lived for a time in Vermont, then moved to what was then the Michigan Territory. In 1843, Ryan purchased 80 acres of land at this location, adding another 80 acres by 1856. At some point he constructed a house slightly north of the location of the present house.

In 1871, Prussian immigrant Lewis Bessert purchased the property from Ryan. The current house was likely built soon after, and was certainly extant by 1874. In about 1875, John Ryan re-acquired the property from Bessert. He lived on the farm until his death in 1890. Ryan's sister, Catherine, lived in the house until 1908, when it was purchased by Henry Eddy. Eddy died in 1914 and his son, Charles, sold the farm to Rosetta and Thomas Spencer in 1916. The Spencers owned the farm until 1945, when it was purchased by Alice and Gerald Taggart. The Taggerts eventually subdivided the property, selling all but five aces surrounding the house. In 1996, Merta and Mark Walters purchased the house, and owned it until 2003.

== Description ==
The Bessert-Ryan House is an Upright and Wing house, sided with clapboards, on a stone foundation. The house has original Queen Anne detailing. The two-story upright section has a front gable containing two two-over-two windows in wooden surrounds on each story. The one-and-a-half story side-gable wing has a steeply pitched center gable facing the front of the house and a shed-roof porch spanning the length of the wing. The porch is supported by turned posts with bracketry. A French door is located in the center of the porch, flanked by two-over-two windows. Above, a decorative vergeboard is mounted along the roofline; the vergeboard extends into the upright section.

A two-story addition to the rear was added in 2010, replacing an earlier single-story addition with roughly the same footprint. The addition is centered on the main section of the house, and is constructed in a similar form.
