= Jacob Hoffstetter House =

Historic house in Ann Arbor, Michigan, US

- U.S. National Register of Historic Places
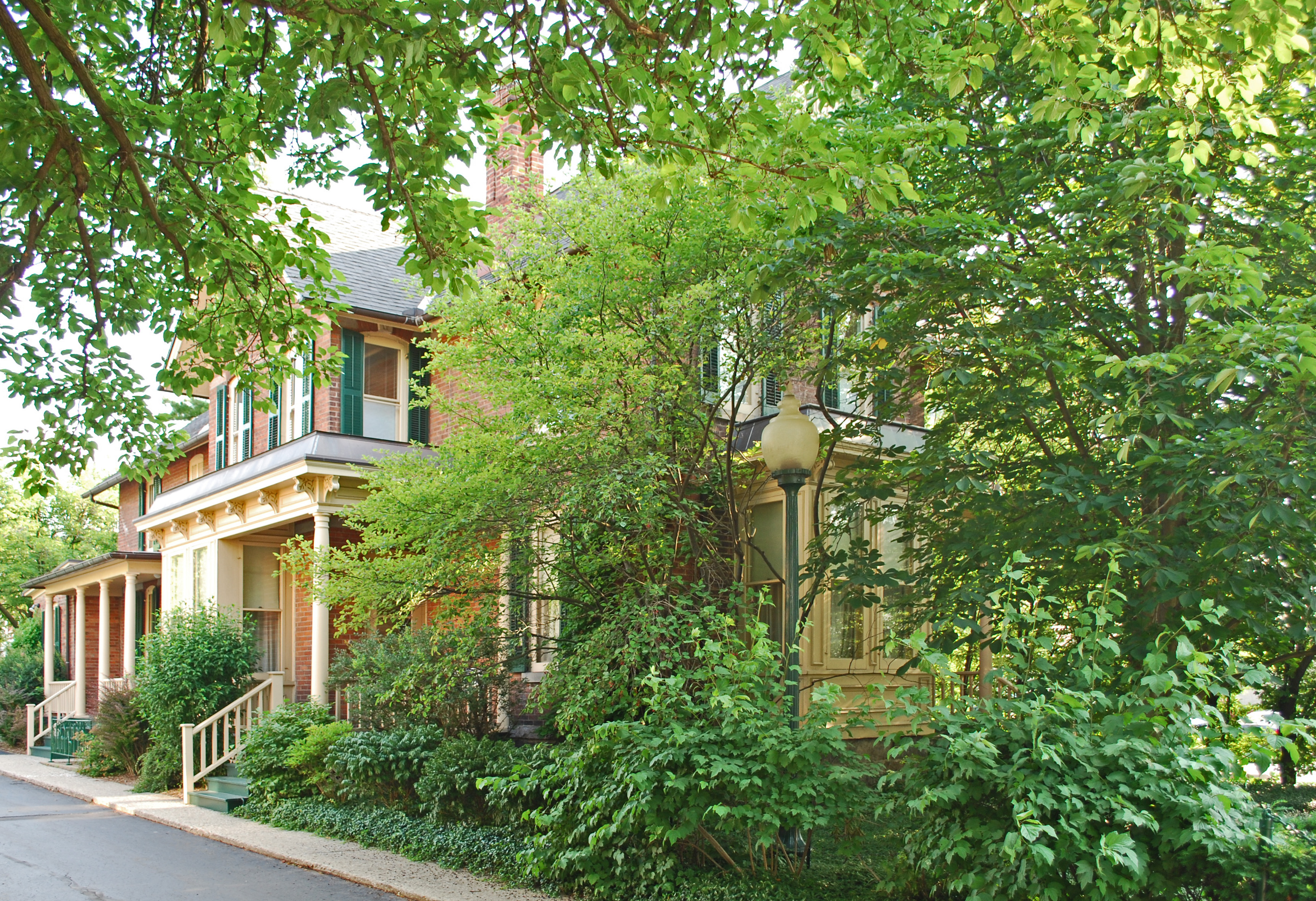
- Interactive map
- Location: 322 E. Washington St., Ann Arbor, Michigan
- Coordinates: 42°16′48″N 83°44′42″W
- Area: less than one acre
- Built: 1887
- Architectural style: Late Victorian, Queen Ann style
- NRHP reference No.: 82002886
- Added to NRHP: March 19, 1982

The Jacob Hoffstetter House is a former single-family home located at 322 East Washington Street in Ann Arbor, Michigan. It was built in 1887 in the Queen Ann style. It was listed on the National Register of Historic Places in 1982.

== History ==
Jacob Hoffstetter arrived in Ann Arbor, Michigan in 1854 at the age of five with his parents, Christian and Mary Hoffstetter; one of a large number of German immigrants who arrived in the area in the 1840s and 1850s. In 1872, Jacob Hoffstetter established a saloon and grocery on Main Street. Jacob, his wife, and two sons lived above the store for some time. The business proved prosperous, and in about 1887 Hoffstetter sold the business and used the proceeds to construct this house.

The home was large, and the Hoffstetters took on boarders. These included the men of the University of Michigan chapter of the Alpha Tau Omega fraternity, who boarded with the Hoffstetters from 1888 when the chapter was founded until 1894.

In 1937, the house was divided into apartments. Peter Heydon purchased the building in 1980 and converted it for commercial and residential use. It is a rare survivor of its 19th-century neighborhood.

It was listed on the National Register of Historic Places on March 19, 1982.

== Architecture ==
The Jacob Hoffstetter House is a large two-story, red brick, gabled gate Victorian Queen Anne style structure sitting on a coursed ashlar foundation. The windows are narrow, single-light-sash, double-hung units with stone sills and segmental-arch heads. At the lintel level in each story, a two-brick high belt course of yellow brick encircles the building. Bay windows and the two side porches are topped with cornices. The windows are topped with carved stone keystones.

In 1937, the house was divided into apartments, and a new entrance was constructed at the southeast corner. This renovation substantially altered the interior, but much of the original wood trim was kept and new trim was selected to be consistent with the old.
