= Charles Guthard House =

- U.S. National Register of Historic Places
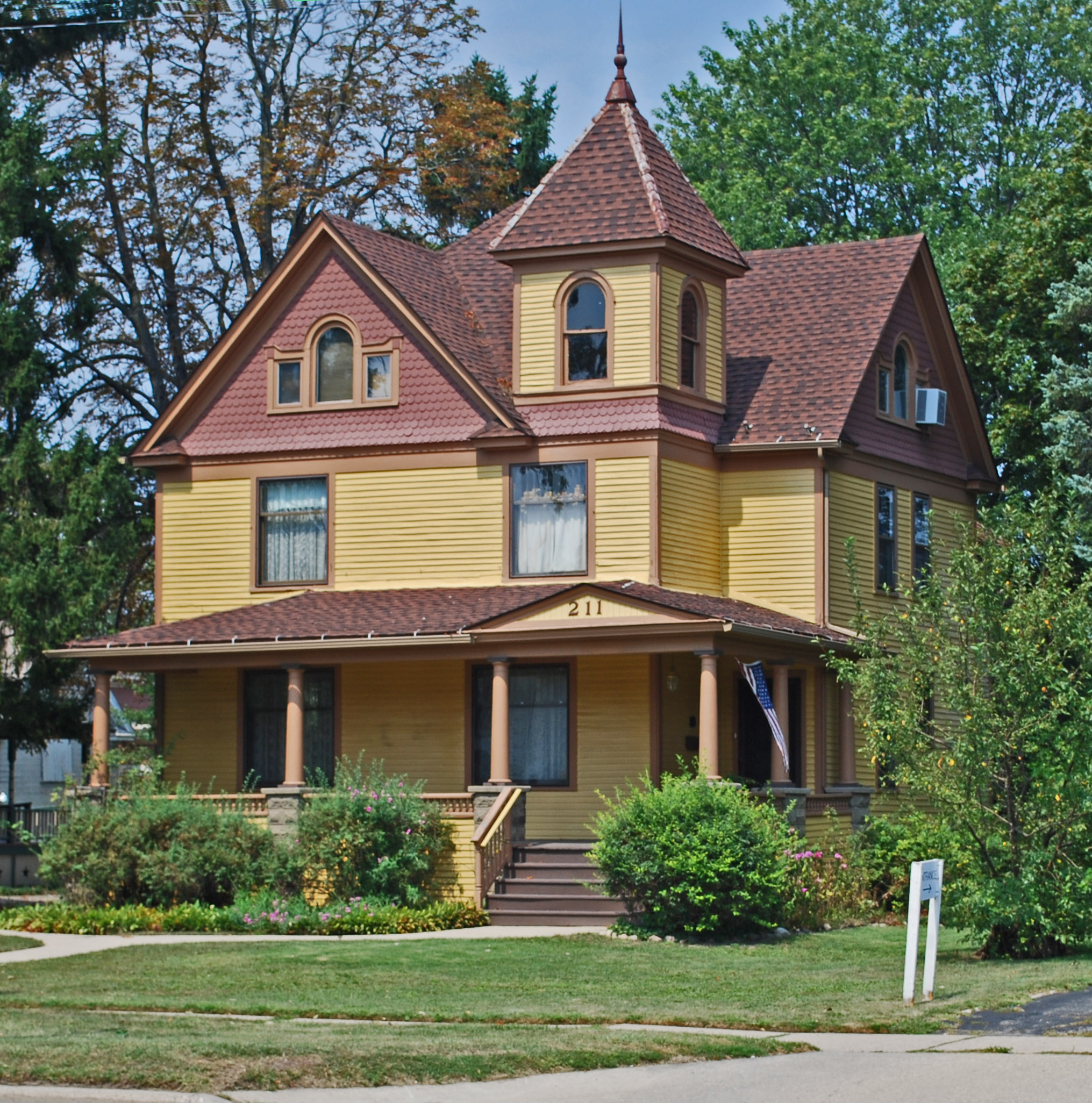
- Interactive map
- Location: 211 E. Michigan Ave., Saline, Michigan
- Coordinates: 42°10′07″N 83°46′41″W
- Area: less than one acre
- Built: 1907
- Built by: Elwood Rogers
- Architectural style: Colonial Revival, Queen Anne
- MPS: Saline MRA
- NRHP reference No.: 85002955
- Added to NRHP: October 10, 1985

The Charles Guthard House is a single-family home located at 211 E. Michigan Avenue in Saline, Michigan. It was listed on the National Register of Historic Places in 1985.

== History ==
This house was constructed by Elwood Rogers, a prolific local builder around the turn of the century. The first owner was Charles Guthard, who was a farmer and later a successful self-made businessman. Guthard was born in Saline Township, and worked as a farm hand until he saved enough money to open his own hardware business in 1903, in partnership with Adam Hornung. This partnership was dissolved in 1904, but Guthard then successfully partnered in Henry Schroen to open an extensive business in general hardware, farm implements, buggies, paints, glass and other sundries. Guthard later left Saline and moved West.

== Description ==
The Charles Guthard House is a frame house designed with a combination of Colonial Revival and Queen Anne elements. It was a square corner tower, and a single story front porch that runs the full width of the front. The front facade combines round arched, rectangular, and Palladian windows. Shingles accent the gable ends and the tower, as well as the hipped roof corner tower itself.
