= German Park Recreation Club =

- U.S. National Register of Historic Places
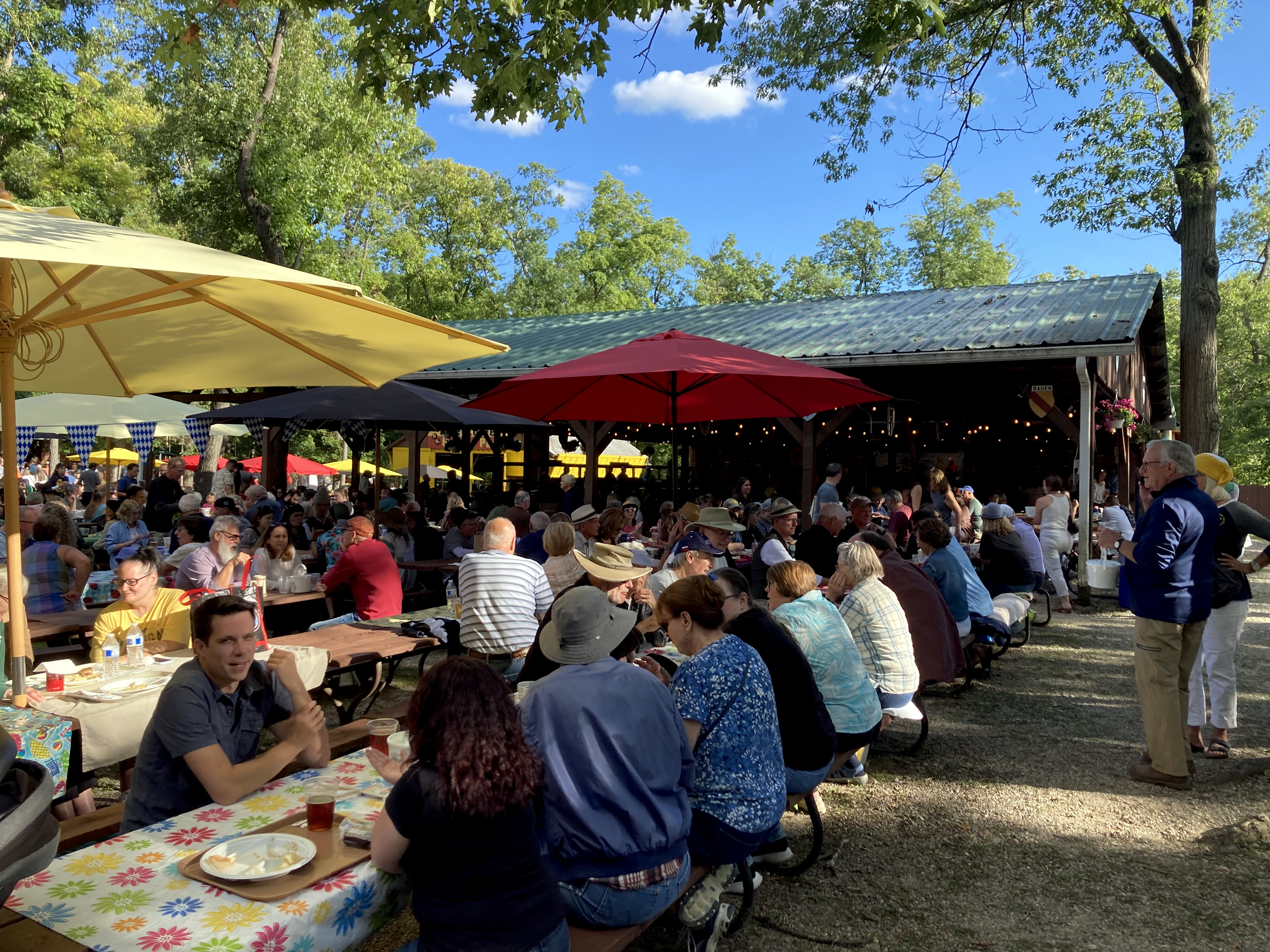
- Interactive map
- Location: 5549 Pontiac Trail, Northfield Township, Michigan
- Coordinates: 42°21′29″N 83°40′38″W
- Built: 1938
- Architectural style: Vernacular
- NRHP reference No.: 100012313
- Added to NRHP: November 19, 2025

The German Park Recreation Club is a recreational located at 5549 Pontiac Trail in Northfield Township, Michigan, United States. It was listed on the National Register of Historic Places in 2025.

== History ==
A large number of German families emigrated from Europe and settled in Ann Arbor and the nearby Northfield Township in the 1920s. The German community gathered together for community events, typically meeting in homes. However, as the number of families increased, the community outgrew the space available in private homes, and it became more common to meet outdoors, at lakeside empty lots. In 1934, a large number of families rented a wooded park southeast of Ann Arbor for a community gathering. The event was so successful that the group decided to purchase a permanent place for community events. In 1938, the German Park Recreation Club was formed, with five families donating five dollars each as a down payment on ten acres of land at the location of the current park.

The club sold bonds to raise the remaining funds, and constructed a dance hall on the property. The park opened on July 17, 1938. Additional buildings were constructed during the remainder of the 20th century, including a clubhouse constructed in 1962–63, restrooms in 1967–70, and a ticket house dating from 1988. As of 2025, the German Park Recreation Club uses the facility to host public festivals celebrating German food and culture. These festivals are held three times per year in the summer.

== Description ==
The German Park Recreation Club contains a small group of recreational buildings, including a clubhouse, dance hall, ticket house, restrooms, beverage house, and kitchen. The site is primarily wooded, and also includes picnic areas and a soccer field. The buildings are set far back from Pontiac Trail, and are constructed of wood frame or concrete block.

The oldest building, the original dance hall, dates from 1938 and is a single story frame building covered with vertical board siding. It has a metal roof and sits on concrete blocks. Wooden panels on the building open to create a picnic shelter. The beverage house, also from 1938, is a single story concrete block building. A second wing was added to the building later.

The newer clubhouse and dance pavilion dates from 1962, with multiple later additions. It is built into the hill, and has an upper level dance pavilion with a clubhouse in the basement level. Other buildings on the site include the picnic shelter, constructed in 1953, the 1967 kitchen, restrooms, and a ticket house.
