= Methodist Episcopal Church Parsonage =

- U.S. National Register of Historic Places
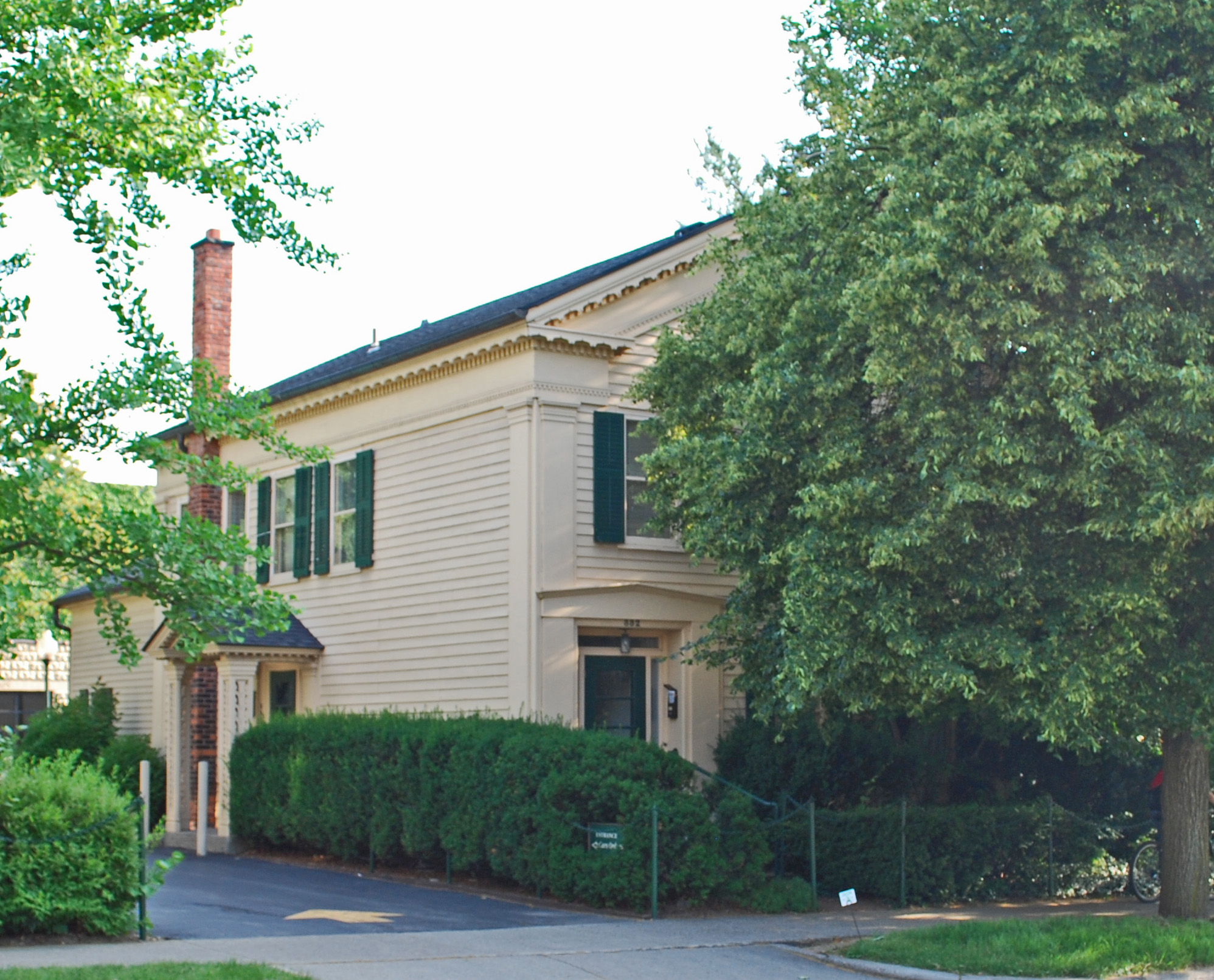
- Interactive map
- Location: 332 E. Washington St., Ann Arbor, Michigan
- Coordinates: 42°16′48″N 83°44′41″W
- Area: less than one acre
- Built: 1858
- Architectural style: Greek Revival
- NRHP reference No.: 82002887
- Added to NRHP: March 18, 1982

The Methodist Episcopal Church Parsonage is a single-family home located at 332 East Washington Street in Ann Arbor, Michigan. It was listed on the National Register of Historic Places in 1982.

== History ==
The Methodist Episcopal Church in Ann Arbor, founded in 1827, is one of the oldest congregations in the state. In 1857, The Rev. Seth Reed was appointed to a two-year pastorate at the church. Known as a strong organizer, Reed had reinvigorated a number of other congregations in the state, and Ann Arbor was no exception. In his two years, Reed enlarged and modernized the congregation's 1837 church, and in 1858 had this parsonage built.

The house served as a parsonage until about 1880. In 1882, English immigrant and shoe merchant William Allaby purchased the house. Allaby lived there until his death in 1910. In 1924, auto dealer and repair shop owner Albert M. Graves purchased the house. Graves died in 1927, but his widow continued to live in the house until her death in 1962. In 1957 the house was divided into apartments. The house was rehabilitated into commercial and residential space in 1980.

== Description ==
The former Methodist Episcopal Church Parsonage is a two-story, end-gable, Greek Revival structure with a 1 1/2-story rear wing. It is covered with clapboard. The front entrance is surrounded by sidelights and a transom light and capped with a cornice supported by Tuscan pilasters. The house has scalloped-edge eavesboard trim and by a highly stylized classical porch on the side entrance, indicating the transition from classical Greek Revival style to the more decorative styles of the later nineteenth century.
