= Wallace Block =

- Wallace Block-Old Saline Village Hall
- U.S. National Register of Historic Places
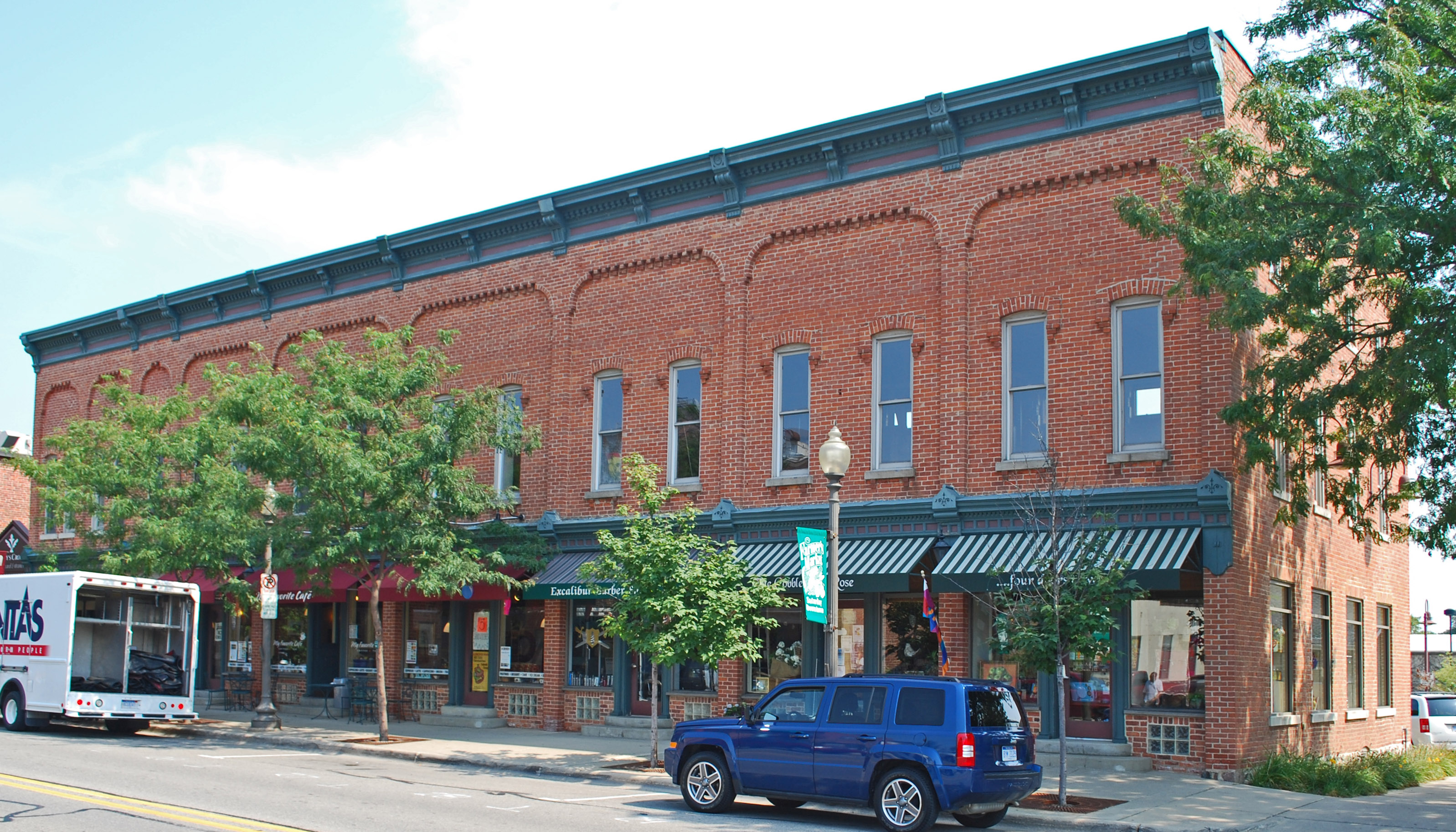
- Interactive map
- Location: 101-113 S. Ann Arbor St., Saline, Michigan
- Coordinates: 42°09′58″N 83°46′51″W
- Area: less than one acre
- Built: 1887
- Architectural style: Italianate
- MPS: Saline MRA
- NRHP reference No.: 85002964
- Added to NRHP: October 10, 1985

The Wallace Block is a commercial building located at 101-113 South Ann Arbor Street in Saline, Michigan. It was listed on the National Register of Historic Places in 1985.

== History ==
In 1881, the structures previously located at this site were destroyed by fire. In 1887, the village of Saline purchased a plot of land on which to build a fire house. The combined fire house and village hall, which is now the northern one-and-a-half bays of the Wallace Block, was erected later that year. Also in 1887, Edwin Wallace constructed an adjoining six-bay building known then as the Wallace Block. This building had six ground-level storefronts and a second-story hall where the Saline Opera House was located. Early stores located in the building included a barber shop, clothing store, tailor, and a machine shop, and later a grocer, candy store, print shop, and hardware.

The Opera House was located for a number of years in the Wallace Block. A dance floor was installed in 1912, and the space later served as a meeting hall and basketball court. The tower above the fire house was removed in 1931, and the original upper floor windows were bricked over in the 1960s. However, the building was later remodelled for commercial use, and the facade rehabilitated.

== Description ==
The Wallace Block is a two-story Italianate red brick structure measuring 116 feet by 70 feet, fronting directly on the sidewalk. It is seven-and-a-half bays wide, with the northern one-and-a-half bays the site of the former village hall. A one-story brick and two-story tile-sheathed addition are located in the rear. The building has recessed second-story panels in each bay, which each contain two rectangular window openings with hoodmolds. A dentillated cornice with brackets and a secondary wooden cornice top the structure. The street level contains central recessed entryways in each storefront, flanked by large display windows which sit on a raised foundation.
