= Miller-Walker House =

- U.S. National Register of Historic Places
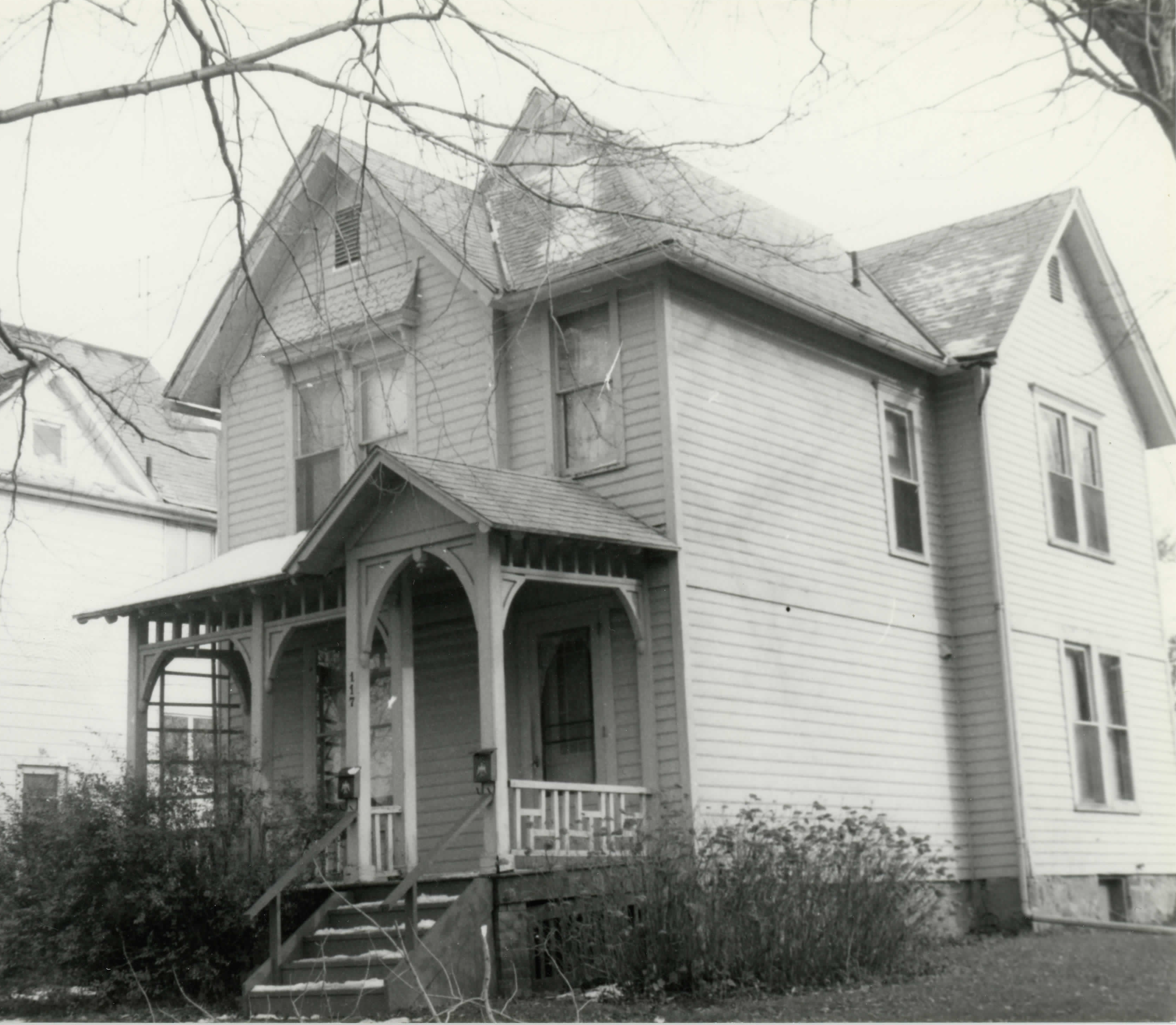
- Interactive map
- Location: 117 McKay St., Saline, Michigan
- Coordinates: 42°10′00″N 83°47′01″W
- Area: less than one acre
- Built: c. 1885
- Architectural style: Stick/Eastlake
- Demolished: ?
- MPS: Saline MRA
- NRHP reference No.: 85002957
- Added to NRHP: October 10, 1985

The Miller-Walker House was a single-family home located at 117 McKay Street in Saline, Michigan. It was listed on the National Register of Historic Places in 1985. The house is missing and is presumed to have been demolished some time after 1985.

== History ==
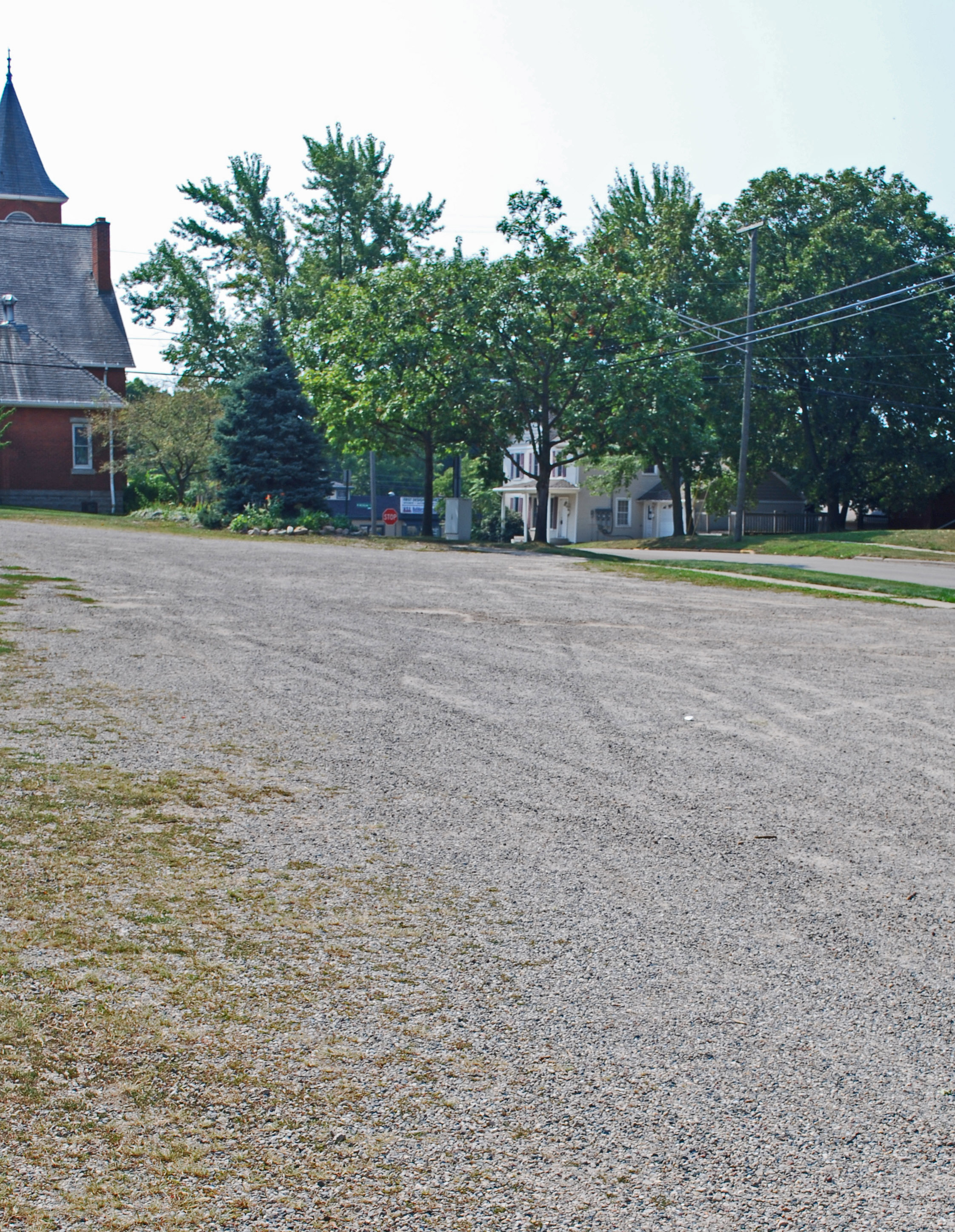
Location of Miller-Walker House

The house was constructed between 1872 and 1888. Who it was built for is unknown, but Charles and Anna Miller occupied the house shortly after their marriage in 1889. Miller was the grandson of pioneer Leonard Miller and operated a livery stable near the Saline Exchange Hotel. Later, the house was purchased by Fred Walker, a retired farmer.

== Description ==
The house was built in a two-story frame Eastern Stick style and had a combination of a hipped and gabled roof. Similarly, the single-story front porch was also built in the Stick style containing decorative stick work in the railing and spindles along the frieze.
