= Joseph Annin House =

- U.S. National Register of Historic Places
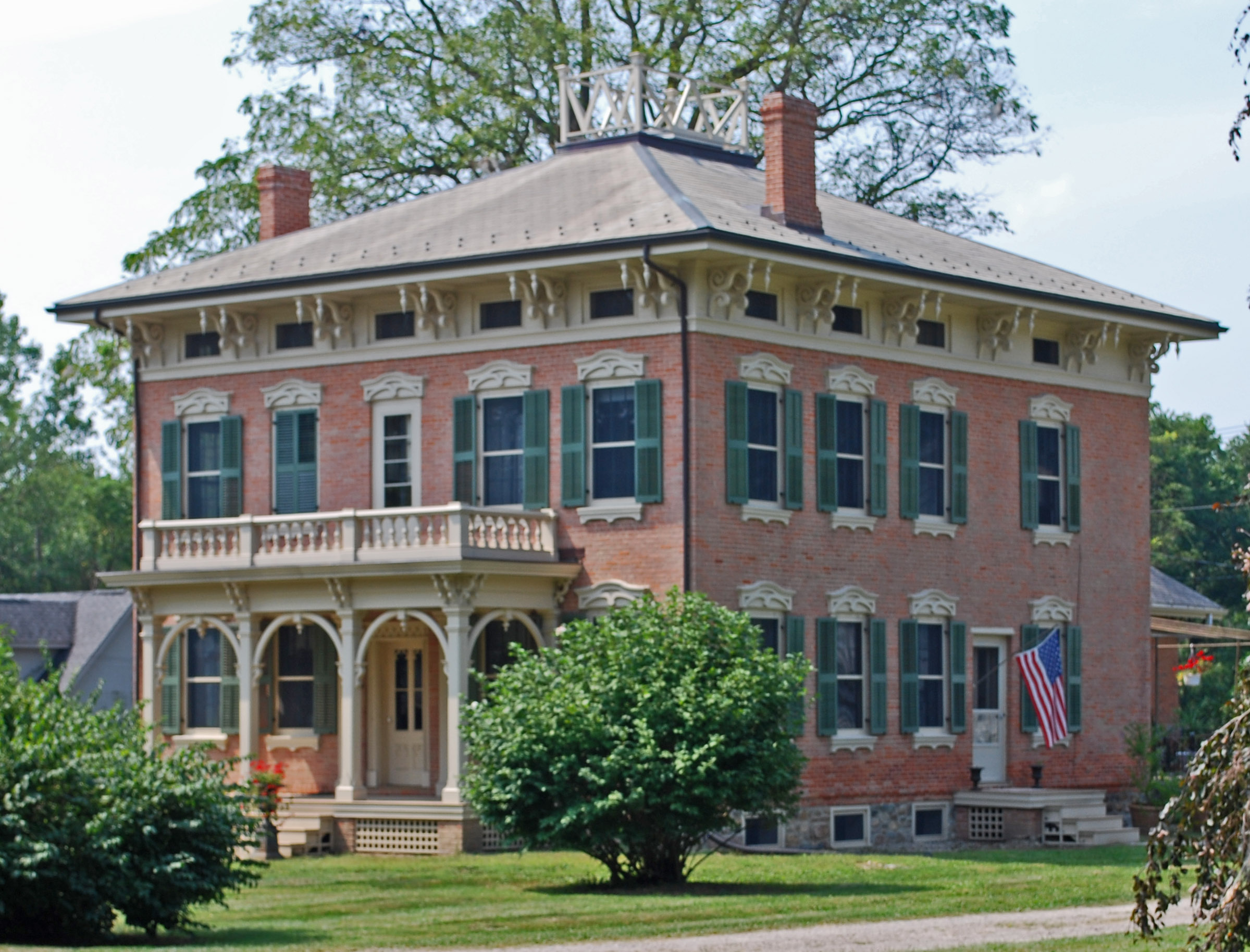
- Interactive map
- Location: 218 Monroe St., Saline, Michigan
- Coordinates: 42°09′42″N 83°47′04″W
- Area: 4.4 acres (1.8 ha)
- Built: 1863
- Architectural style: Italianate
- MPS: Saline MRA
- NRHP reference No.: 85002952
- Added to NRHP: October 10, 1985

The Joseph Annin House is a single-family home located at 218 Monroe Street in Saline, Michigan. It was listed on the National Register of Historic Places in 1985.

== History ==
This house was constructed in 1863 for farmer Joseph Annin. In 1867 it was purchased by Alfred Miller, who owned a local hotel. In 1873 it changed hands again, this time to Harvey Bennett, and in 1876 John Hull purchased it. It was later home to the Peoples family, who purchased the home in 1918.

== Description ==
The Joseph Annin House is a two-story brick Italianate structure shaped like a cube. It is five bays across, with a central entrance portico. It has hip roof with matching interior chimney sand overhanging eaves supported by paired ornamental brackets. Between the brackets are small rectangular windows. Window openings on the primary facades are shuttered double sash with decorative wooden lintels above. A wooden barn/carriage house with a gabled roof and vertical board-and-batten siding sits behind the house.
