= James Litchfield House =

Historic house in Michigan, United States

- U.S. National Register of Historic Places
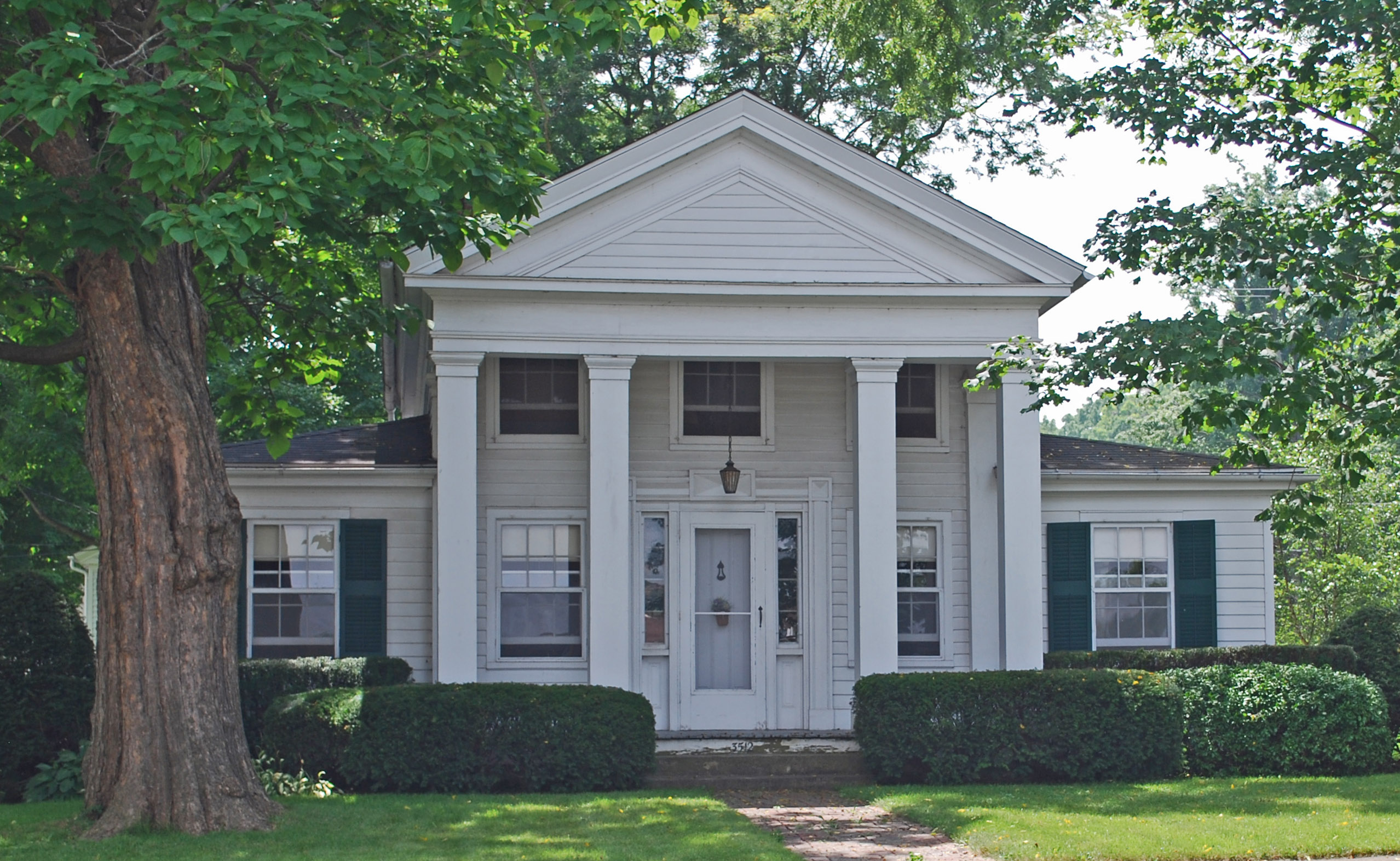

- Location within Michigan Location within the United States
- Interactive map
- Location: 3512 Central St., Dexter, Michigan
- Coordinates: 42°20′20″N 83°52′55″W
- Area: less than one acre
- Built: 1850
- Architectural style: Greek Revival
- NRHP reference No.: 84000567
- Added to NRHP: December 27, 1984

The James Litchfield House is a private house located at 3512 Central Street in Dexter, Michigan. It was listed on the National Register of Historic Places in 1984. The house is an excellent Michigan example of a "basilica type" Greek Revival house.

== History ==
James Litchfield arrived in Washtenaw County from Connecticut in the 1830s. Litchfield was a cabinet maker, and operated a sawmill for some time near Dexter. In 1845, Litchfield purchased a plot of land from Judge Samuel Dexter, founder of the village of Dexter. Shortly afterward, he began building this house, completing it in 1850. In 1853, Litchfield sold the house to his brother Edward, and the house remained in the Litchfield family until about 1950.

== Description ==
The Litchfield House is a Greek Revival style house with a central two-story mass flanked by single-story wings. The house is clad in white clapboard and sits on a fieldstone foundation. The front facade is symmetrical, having a three-bay temple portico with four square columns fronting the main mass of the house. The columns are unevenly spaced; with the central bay wider than the others. Under the portico are a central entry flanked by sidelights, with a six-over-six window to each side. Three six-over-six windows are located above.

The one-story wings each contain one six-over-six window with shutters. The corners of the wings have simple cornerboards. More six-over-six windows are located on the sides and rear of the house. Additions housing the kitchen and garage are architecturally similar and have minimal effect on the overall appearance of the house.

On the interior, the house contains a central hall and stairway. Two pairs of rooms are on each side of the central hall, and a dining room is at the rear with the kitchen behind. The upper floor contains an L-shaped landing with a small room at one end. The interior has wide board flooring, simple baseboards, and simple window and door trim.
