= Louis Sturm House =

- U.S. National Register of Historic Places
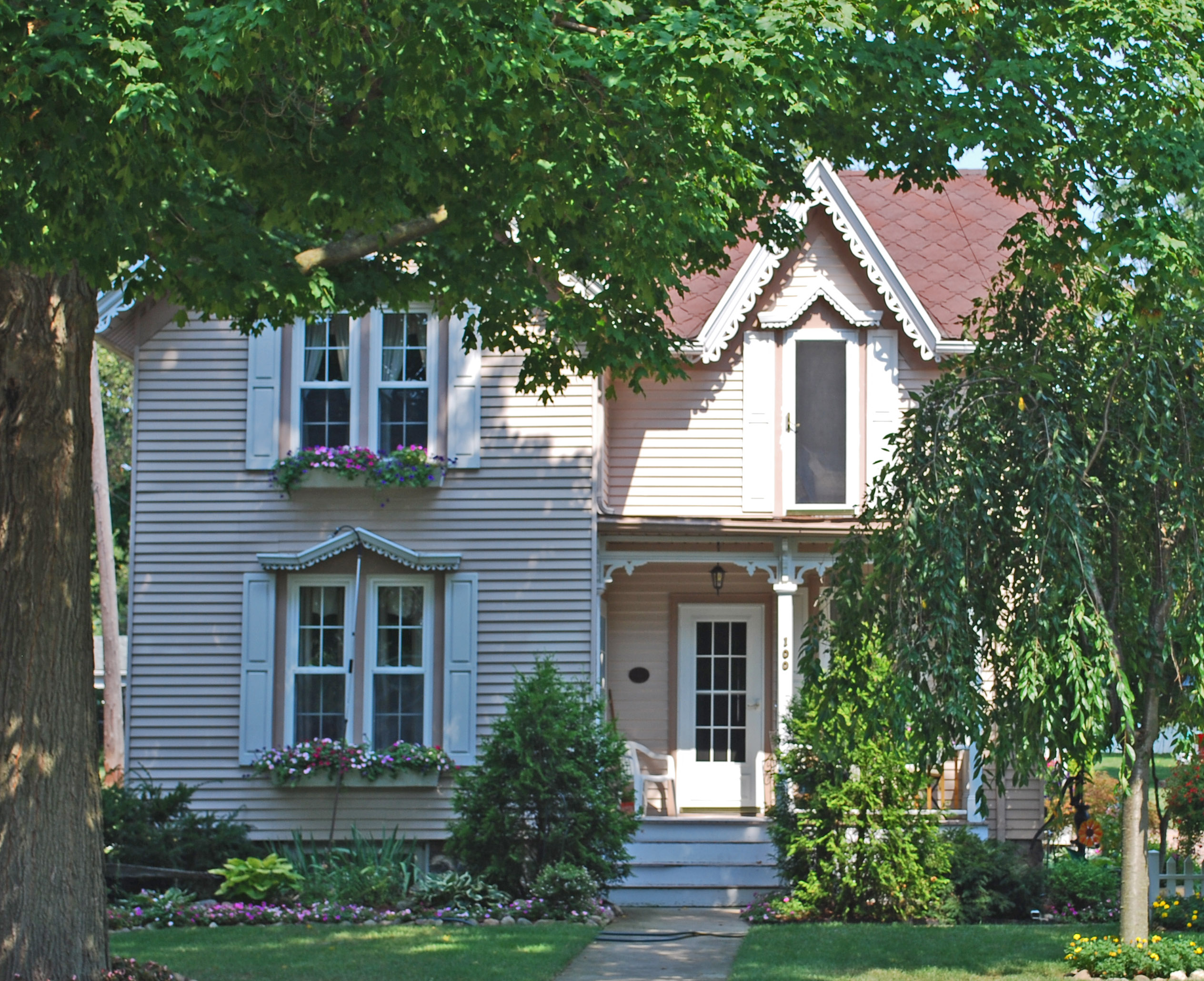
- Interactive map
- Location: 100 Russell, Saline, Michigan
- Coordinates: 42°10′06″N 83°47′03″W
- Area: less than one acre
- Built: 1873
- Architectural style: Gothic Revival
- MPS: Saline MRA
- NRHP reference No.: 85002961
- Added to NRHP: October 10, 1985

The Louis Sturm House is a single family home located at 100 Russell in Saline, Michigan. It was listed on the National Register of Historic Places in 1985.

== History ==
In 1873, William Easlick purchased this lot and presumably constructed this house at the time. In 1874, Louis Sturm bought the property for $1210. Sturm had emigrated from Germany around 1860 and joined his older brother, Jacob, who had arrived in Saline in 1858. The two brothers opened a harness business located on the Chicago Road. The business was successful, and they expanded it to include a hardware and carriage manufacturing business. The Sturms constructed carriages for local as well as national customers. Jacob Sturm died in 1900. and Louis continued the business, passing it on to his son, William, after he died in 1903.

== Description ==
The Louis Sturm House is an L-shaped two-story frame house with Gothic Revival detailing, including a steeply pitched roof and dormer, peaked window trim and pointed-arch eave- line trim. It has a one-story rear garage addition and front and side porches with brackets and trim at the eaves.
