= Henry R. Watson House =

- U.S. National Register of Historic Places
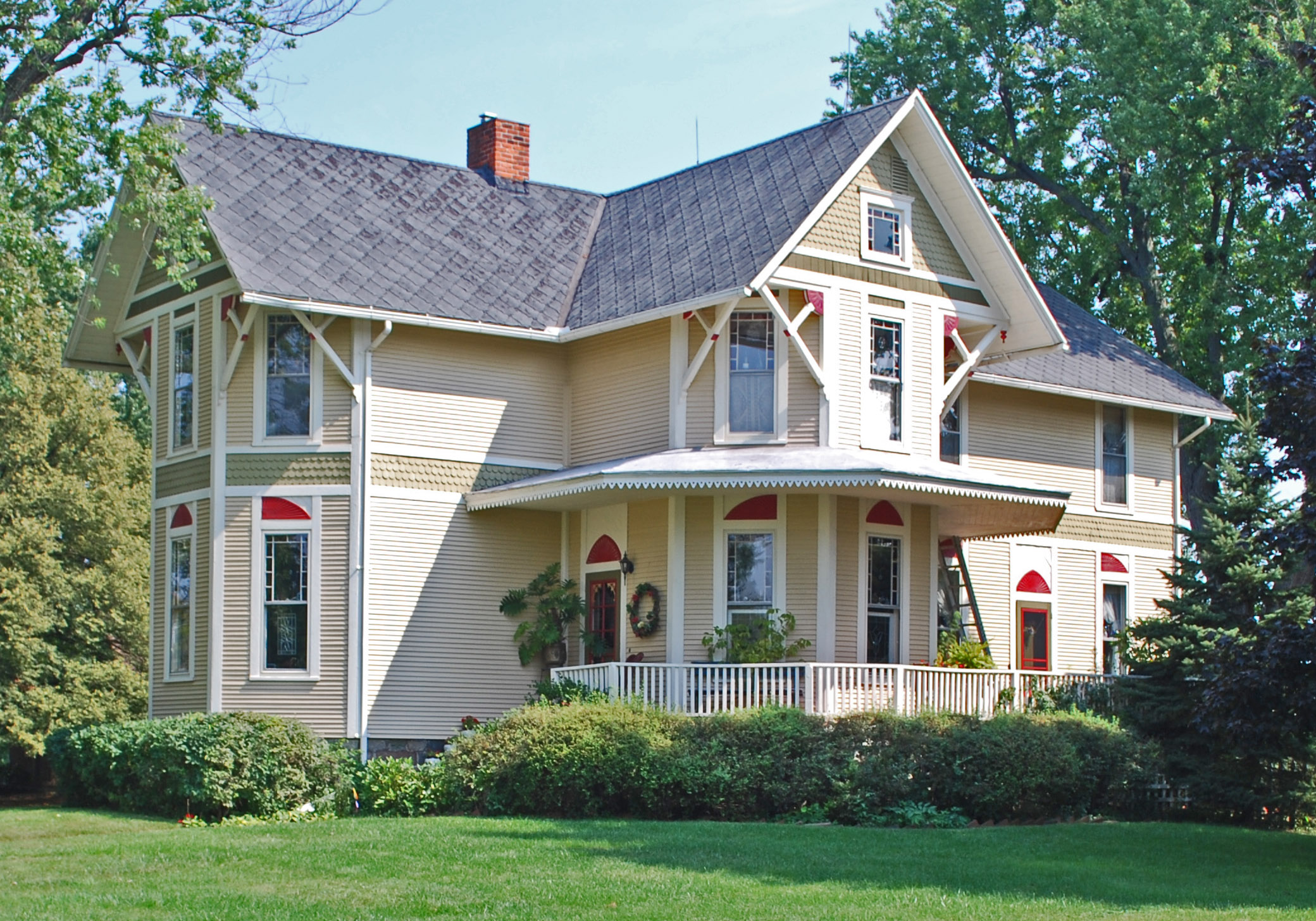
- Interactive map
- Location: 7215 N. Ann Arbor-Saline Rd., Saline, Michigan
- Coordinates: 42°10′50″N 83°47′13″W
- Area: less than one acre
- Built: 1883
- Built by: Henry Rentchler
- Architectural style: Stick/Eastlake
- MPS: Saline MRA
- NRHP reference No.: 85002965
- Added to NRHP: October 10, 1985

The Henry R. Watson House is a single-family home located at 7215 North Ann Arbor-Saline Road in Saline, Michigan. It was listed on the National Register of Historic Places in 1985.

== History ==
Dr. Henry R. Watson studied and practiced medicine with his father in the early nineteenth century, and set up his own practice around 1851. In 1882, he purchased the property this house sits on. A previous house was already located here, but in 1883 Watson hired builder Henry Rentchler to construct this house. He raised sheep on the surrounding farm.

== Description ==
The Watson house is a two-and-one-half story frame cross-gable Stick Style house on a stone foundation. It has a wraparound Eastlake front porch and an overhanging side porch. Decorative details include corner posts, shingled beltcourses, and sunburst panels above windows and in the gable ends. There are multiple projecting bays having diagonal brackets at the eavesline.
