= Zeeb Farm =

- U.S. National Register of Historic Places
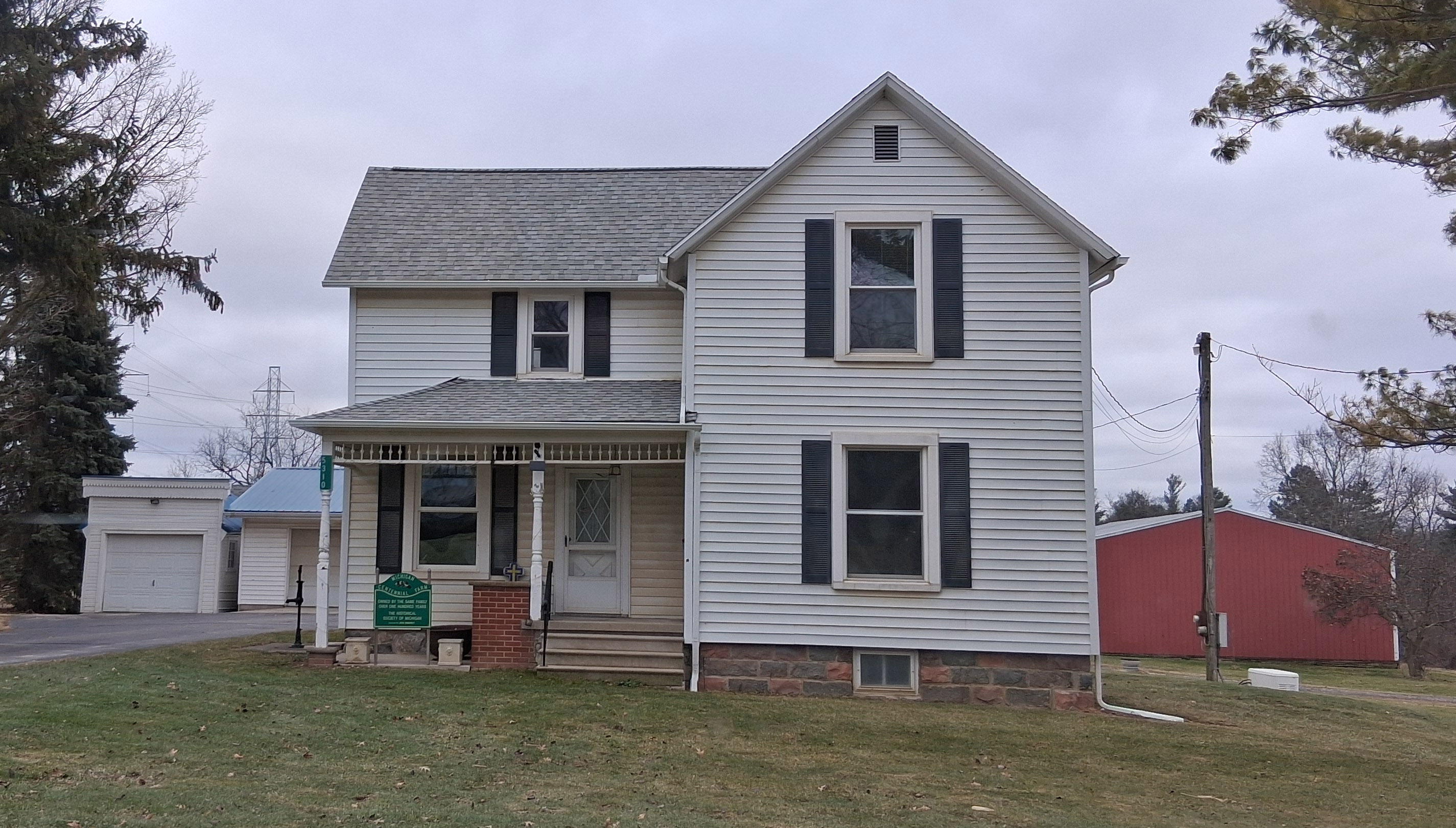
- George Zeeb House
- Interactive map
- Location: 5310-5380 Earhart Rd, Northfield Township, Michigan
- Coordinates: 42°21′9″N 83°40′56″W
- Built: 1885
- Architectural style: Craftsman
- NRHP reference No.: 100012312
- Added to NRHP: August 24, 2026

The Zeeb Farm is a historic farm located at 5310-5380 Earhart Road in Northfield Township, Michigan (near Ann Arbor). It was listed on the National Register of Historic Places in 2026.

== History ==
George Zeeb was born in 1835 in Germany, and emigrated to the United States in 1853. He and his parents established a farm at the intersection of what are now Zeeb and Jackson Roads west of Ann Arbor. In 1858 George Zeeb married Katharine Sautter, who had also emigrated from Germany with her family, arriving in 1847. George and Katherine moved to Northfield Township in 1865, joining many other farmers of German descent who settled in the area.

In 1885, the Zeebs purchased 60 acres of what is now the Zeeb farm and constructed the two-story George Zeeb House on the property. The couple had seven children; their sons George Zeeb Jr. and Fred Zeeb continued farming the Zeeb property. George Jr. and Fred purchased an addition 80 acres in 1897 and 40 more acres in 1910, while George Sr. purchased an additional 80 acres in 1910. In 1898, George Jr. married Margaret Theurer, whose parents had also emigrated from Germany. Over time, George Zeeb Jr. consolidated the Zeeb farm holdings. Katherine Zeeb died in 1912, Fred Zeeb died in 1919, and George Sr. died in 1928. At this time, George Jr. held 180 acres of farmland.

Margaret and George Zeeb had two children: Arthur and Cora. Cora lived on the farm her entire life without marrying. In 1923, Arthur married Marie Prochnow, and in 1924 the couple built another house on the property. Arthur Zeeb wound up taking over the farm operations from his father, cintinuing until his death in 1952.

Arthur Zeeb House

After Arthur Zeeb's death, Arthur and Marie's son Kenneth continued farming the property. Kenneth married Joann Enders, and in 1956 the couple built a third home, located between the 1924 Arthur Zeeb house and the 1885 George Zeeb house. However, over time agricultural production declined. In 1987, he sold his dairy herd, and rented out fields to neighboring farmers, until eventually all agricultural operation ceased. Portions of the fields were sold, but as of 2026 the Zeeb family still owned 83 acres of farmland and the three houses.

== Description ==
The Zeeb Farm consists of a complex of buildings, including an 1885 farmhouse, a 1924 Craftsman bungalow, and a 1956 Minimal Traditional-style house. Additional structures include animal barns, granaries, a milk house, storage barns, machine shops, and garages.

The 1885 Katharine and George Zeeb House is a two-story vernacular structure with two wings: a side-gable wing on one side connected to a front-gable wing. A hip-roof corner porch is connected to the side-gable wing. Nearby is the one-and-a-half story 1924 Marie and Arthur Zeeb House, which is a side-gable Craftsman style structure on a concrete block foundation.
