= Samuel D. Van Duzer House =

- U.S. National Register of Historic Places
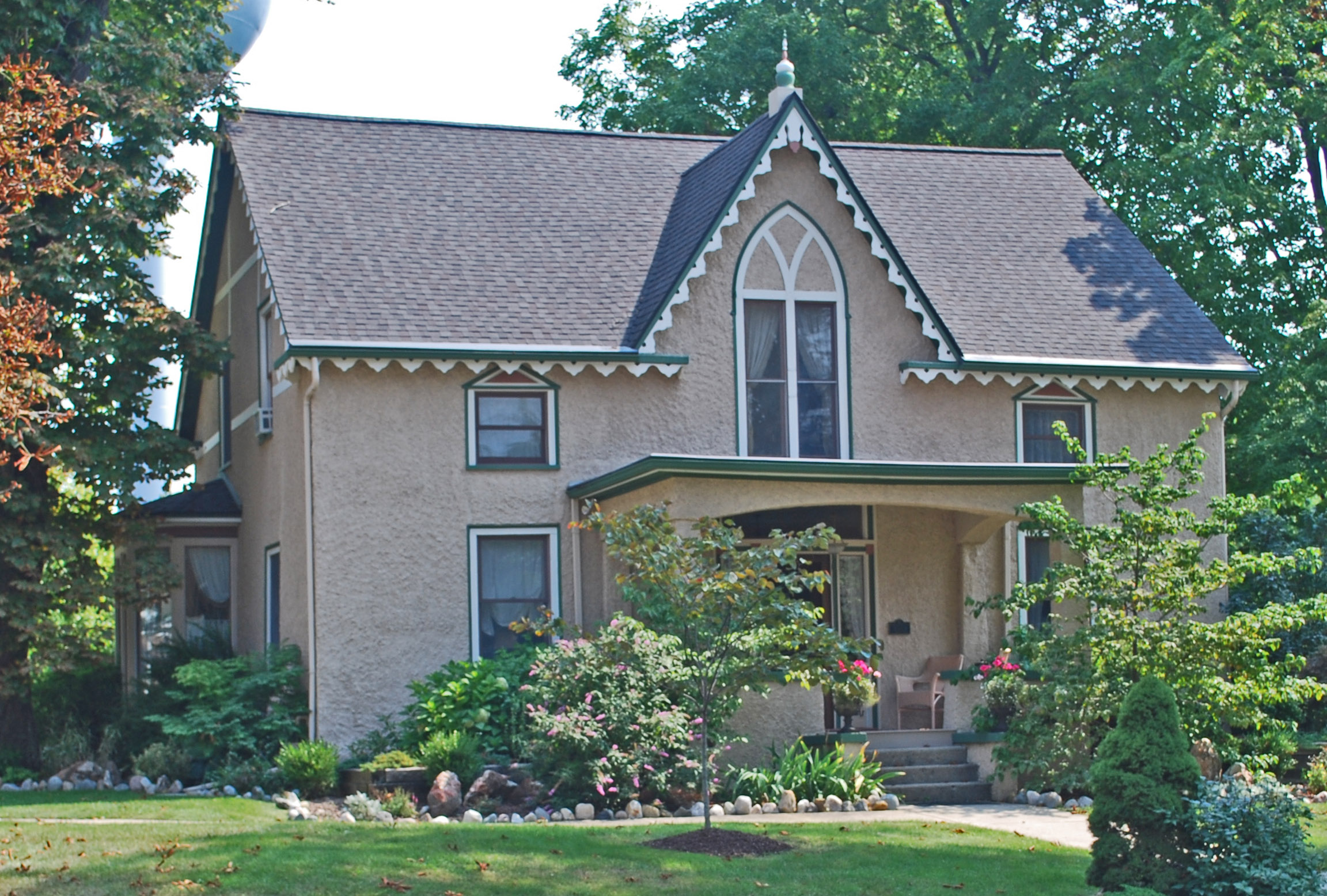
- Interactive map
- Location: 205 S. Ann Arbor St., Saline, Michigan
- Coordinates: 42°09′54″N 83°46′48″W
- Area: less than one acre
- Built: 1858
- Architectural style: Gothic Revival
- MPS: Saline MRA
- NRHP reference No.: 85002963
- Added to NRHP: October 10, 1985

The Samuel D. Van Duzer House was built as a single family home, and is located at 205 South Ann Arbor Street in Saline, Michigan. It was listed on the National Register of Historic Places in 1985.

== History ==
This house was constructed in 1858; newspaper reports indicate it was constructed for merchant Caleb Van Husan, although tax records indicate that Samuel D. Van Duzer was the original owner. In either case, Van Duzer was living in the house by the early 1860s, and remained living there for over 50 years. Samuel Van Duzer came to Saline in 1834 from New York state, when he was 14. He eventually went in to the dry goods business, but then spent most of his career as a clerk and bookkeeper. He also served on the village's board of trustees, and was twice elected president.

Van Duzen lived in the house until his death in 1908. In 1912, the property was purchased by Mr. and Mrs. George Cook. Cook owned a livery business in Saline, and also served as president of the Village of Saline, as well as a Justice of the Peace. The Cooks Cook did the stucco work which now covers the building.

== Description ==
The Samuel D. Van Duzer House is a 1 1/2-story frame structure with a stucco veneer and a steeply pitched gabled roof. It has a one-story rear addition and a stucco front porch. A central dormer in the roof, facing the street, contains a Gothic-arched window and pointed-arch eaves trim. The gable ends are half-timbered.
