= North Ann Arbor Street Historic District =

- U.S. National Register of Historic Places
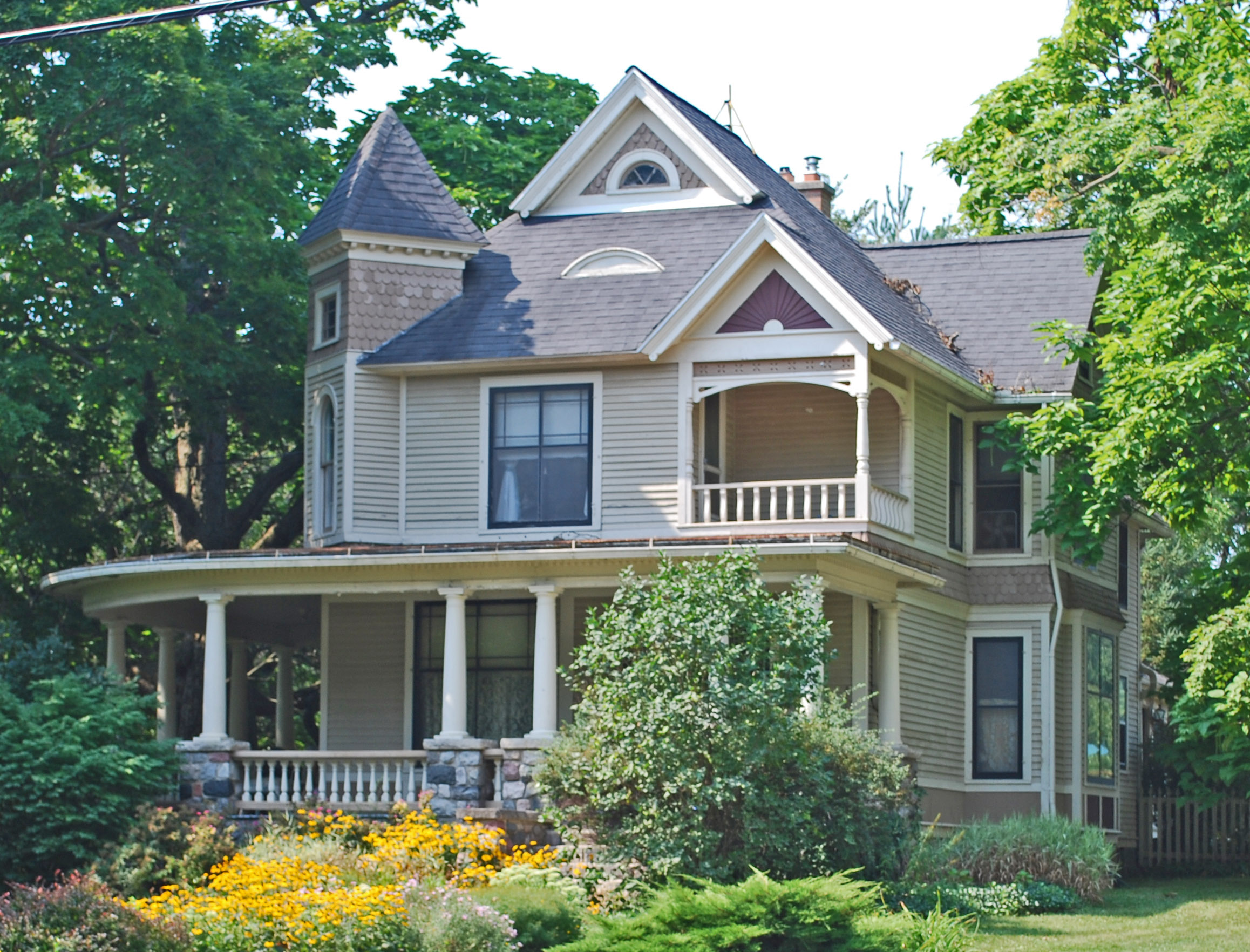
- Interactive map
- Location: 301, 303, and 305-327 N. Ann Arbor St., Saline, Michigan
- Coordinates: 42°10′12″N 83°47′01″W
- Area: 8 acres (3.2 ha)
- Built by: Elwood Rogers, Charles Sauer
- Architectural style: Colonial Revival, Queen Anne, Gothic Revival
- MPS: Saline MRA
- NRHP reference No.: 85002958
- Added to NRHP: October 10, 1985

The North Ann Arbor Street Historic District is a residential historic district, consisting of the houses at 301, 303, and 305-327 North Ann Arbor Street in Saline, Michigan. It was listed on the National Register of Historic Places in 1985.

== History ==
The North Ann Arbor Street Historic District consists of 22 homes and 11 barns and carriage houses, located along a single block of Ann Arbor Street. The houses were constructed from the 1870s through the first part of the 20th century, and are primarily fine vernacular versions of Gothic Revival, Colonial Revival and Queen Anne architecture. The district also contains two Italianate homes and one Bungalow which have had substantial facade alterations, rendering them less historically significant, and two single-story ranch homes. Most of the homes are two-story structures faced with wood.

=== Significant houses ===
- Charles Cool House (303 N. Ann Arbor) This transitional Queen Anne-Colonial Revival home was constructed in 1910 by local builder Elwood Rogers for grain elevator owner Charles Cool. It is a 2 1/2-story frame house with a front portico and Palladian windows. There are shingle accents in the gable ends, spool-and-spindle porch balusters, and projecting bay windows.
- Peter W. Weienett House (308 N. Ann Arbor) This 2 1/2-story frame house was constructed in 1892 for Peter Weienett, a local farmer and businessman and the son of Swiss pioneer and farmer Benedict Weienett. The house is distinguished by sunbursts and shingle accents in the gable ends, a projecting bay window, and two fine Eastlake porches.
- 318 N. Ann Arbor This 1 1/2-story, L-shaped Vernacular building was constructed c. 1880. It has clapboard facing, a steeply pitched gabled roof and dormer, and rectangular windows with peaked lintels. A front porch was added in the 1920s.
- Egbert P. Harper House (319 N. Ann Arbor) This 2 1/2-story frame house was constructed in 1891 by Charles Sauer for State Senator and sheep farmer Egbert P. Harper. The house is Saline's most outstanding example of Queen Anne architecture, with a square corner tower and a covered widows walk with spool and spindle balusters. It has a central eyebrow dormer and decorative shingle and sunburst patterns added along the roof line. The wraparound porch was added in about 1912.
- Edwin W. Ford House (322 N. Ann Arbor) This Queen Anne house was constructed in about 1879 for lumber dealer Edwin W. Ford. It is a two-story T-shaped home covered in clapboard, with a side Eastlake porch and a front porch added some time after 1929.
