= Joshua G. and Nancy (Bly) Leland House =

- U.S. National Register of Historic Places
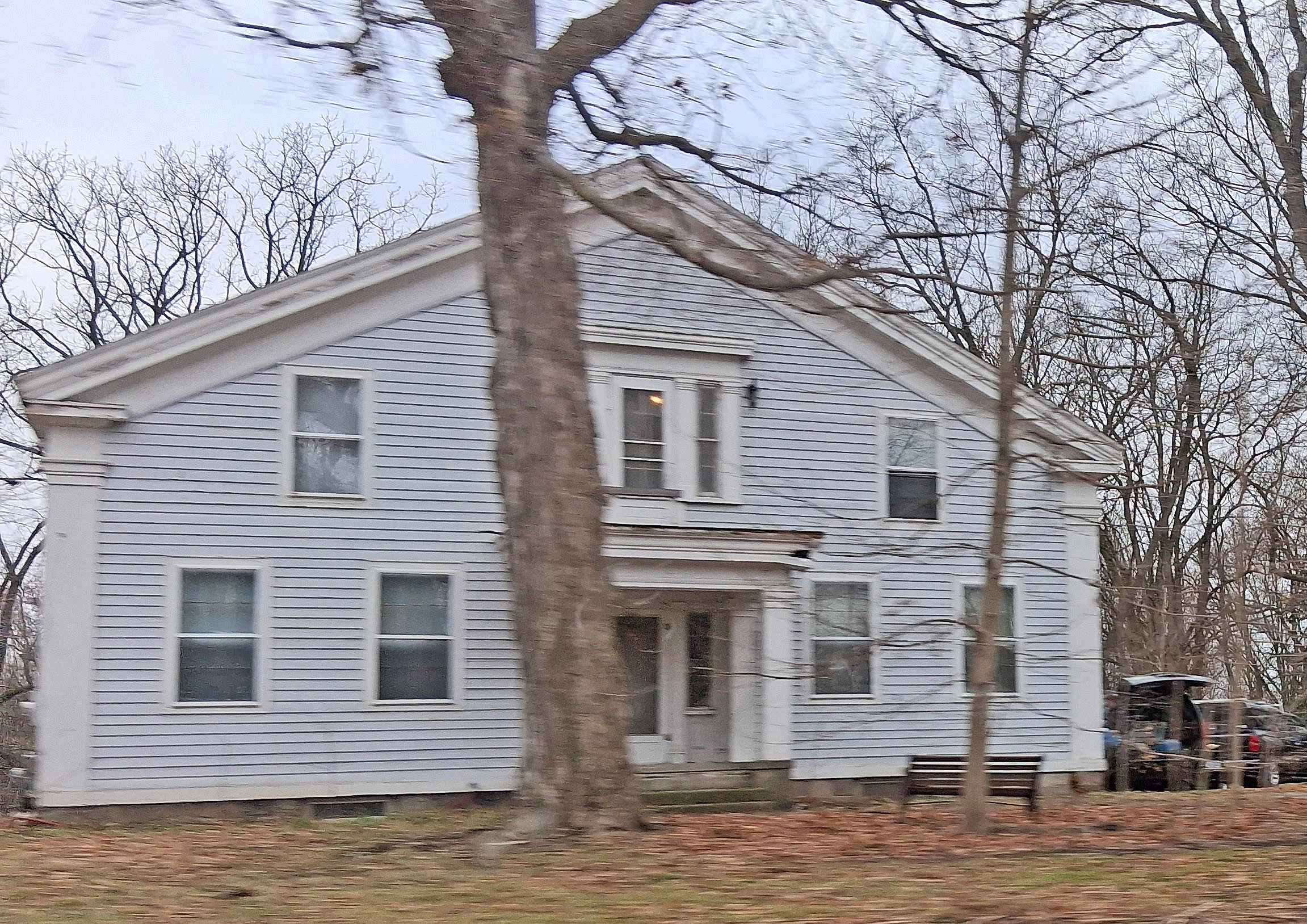
- Interactive map
- Location: 3850 East North Territorial Rd., Northfield Township, Michigan
- Coordinates: 42°22′00″N 83°41′10″W
- Built: 1846
- Architectural style: Colonial Revival, Greek Revival
- NRHP reference No.: 100012316
- Added to NRHP: November 18, 2025

The Joshua G. and Nancy (Bly) Leland House is a historic house located at 3850 East North Territorial Road in Northfield Township, Michigan, United States. It was listed on the National Register of Historic Places in 2025.

== History ==
Joshua Leland was born in 1801. He purchased the land this house sits on in 1831. Leland was president of the Washtenaw County Agricultural Society and served two terms in the Michigan Legislature. He constructed this house in 1846. After his death in 1876, Leland passed it down to his son Emory Ezra Leland, who was a probate judge. He then passed the house to his son Claude Leland. However, the house is no longer owned by members of the Leland family.

== Description ==
The Leland house is a two story, wooden, Greek Revival structure with Colonial Revival detailing sitting on a stone foundation. The house consists of a one-and-a-half story main block and a slightly shorter one-and-a-half ell. The main section is front-gabled and five bays wide. An entrance door with sidelights, covered by a small single-story porch, is located in the center bay. Above the porch, a similar door with sidelights is set into a Classical surround. Two double-hung windows are on each side of the entrance door, with a single window on each side of the second story door. The house has wide wood cornerboards and a wide trim at the cornice. The rear wing dates from 1940.
