= George R. Lutz House =

- U.S. National Register of Historic Places
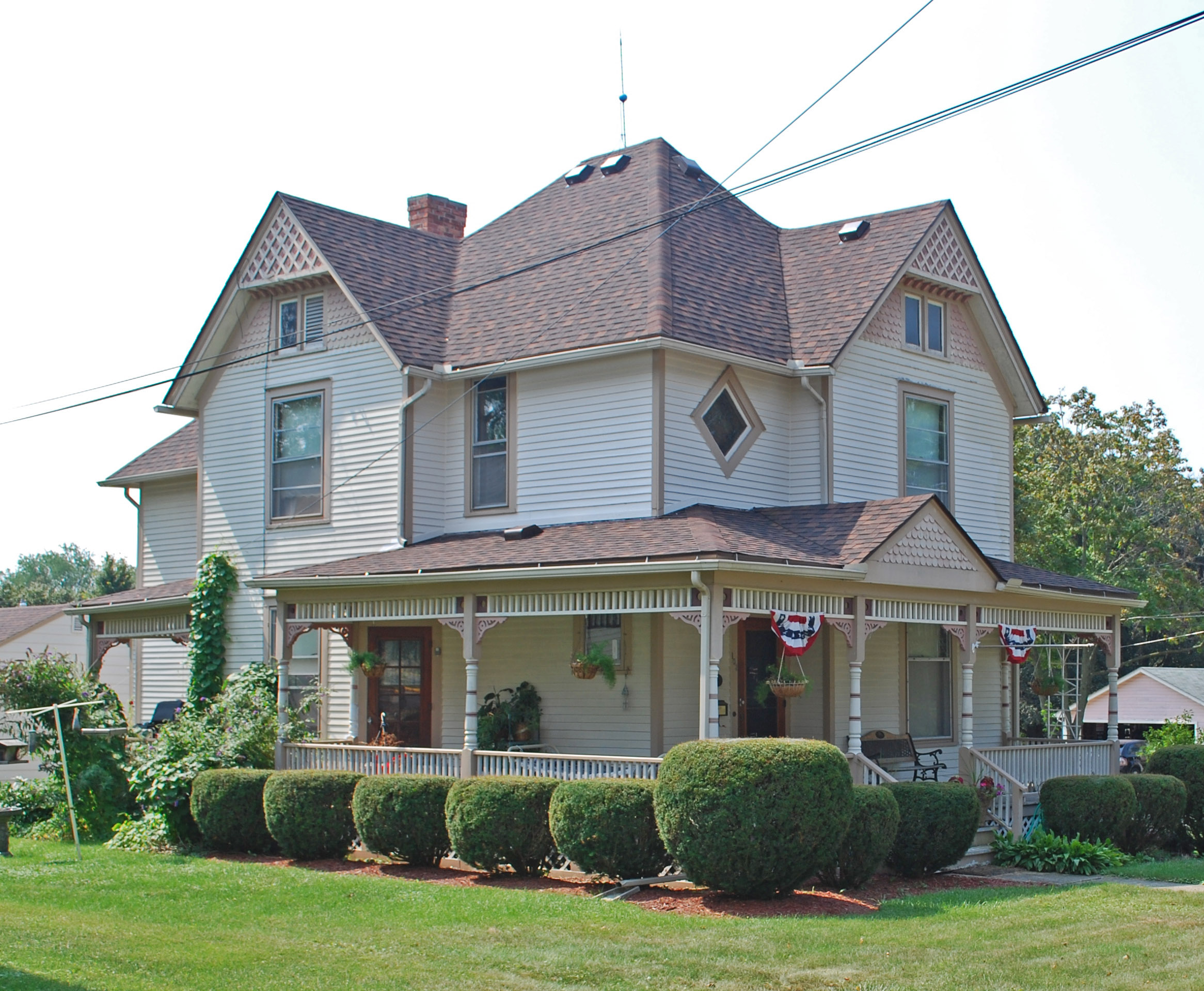
- Interactive map
- Location: 103 W. Henry St., Saline, Michigan
- Coordinates: 42°09′54″N 83°46′53″W
- Area: less than one acre
- Built: 1900
- Architectural style: Queen Anne
- MPS: Saline MRA
- NRHP reference No.: 85002956
- Added to NRHP: October 10, 1985

The George R. Lutz House is a single family home located at 103 West Henry Street in Saline, Michigan. It was listed on the National Register of Historic Places in 1985.

== History ==
This house was constructed in about 1900 for George Nissly. In 1903, George R. Lutz and his wife Gertrude purchased the house from Nissly's estate for $2000. Lutz, a Village clerk and bank employee, died in 1904 at the age of 30. Gertrude Lutz remained living in the house until her own death in the 1940s.

== Description ==
The George R. Lutz House is a 2-1/2 story Queen Anne structure covered with clapboard. It has a hipped roof with front and side gable projections. The facade features a fine example of a wraparound Eastlake with a lattice work base, spool-and-spindle frieze and balusters, and decorative brackets. The house has a variety of window shapes, including small rectangular windows in the gable ends.
