= George W. Palmer House =

Historic house in Michigan, United States

- U.S. National Register of Historic Places
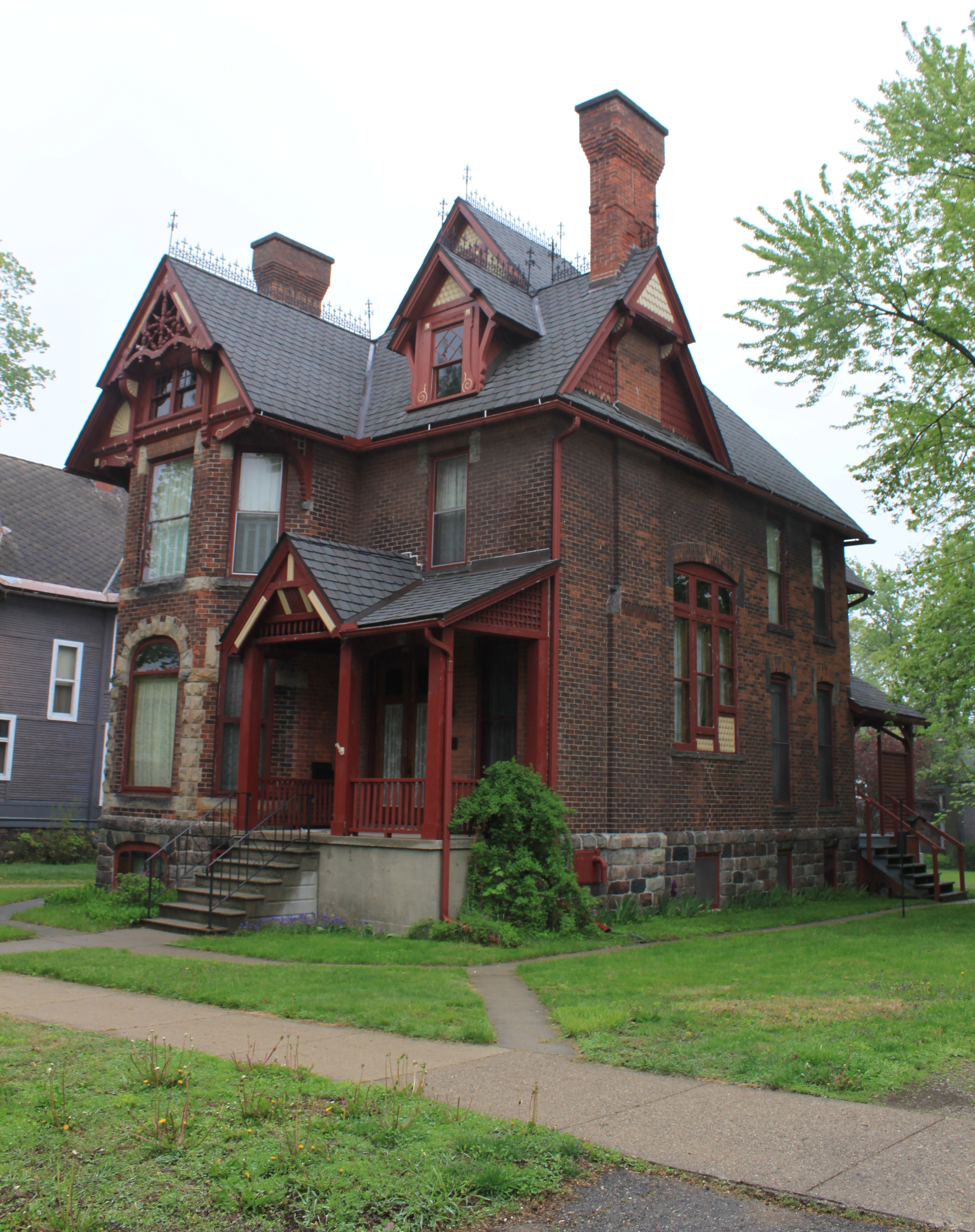

- Location within Michigan Location within the United States
- Interactive map
- Location: 138 E. Middle St., Chelsea, Michigan
- Coordinates: 42°19′5″N 84°1′8″W
- Area: less than one acre
- Built: c. 1885
- Architectural style: Queen Anne
- NRHP reference No.: 96001377
- Added to NRHP: November 29, 1996

The George W. Palmer House (also known as the Chelsea Private Hospital) is a historic house located in Chelsea, Michigan.

== History ==
The house was constructed in about 1885 for physician George W. Palmer. In 1905, Daniel Charles McLaren, a prominent local businessman and village president, bought the house.

In 1936, a small private hospital, known as Chelsea Private Hospital, moved into the building. The hospital, operated by Nettie Notten, had opened in 1926 in another location, and served patients of doctors Malcolm Sibbald and Joseph Fisher. The hospital moved into the Palmer house when the original location was wanted for a post office. Nettie and her husband Ehlert, a dairy farmer, lived on the ground floor, while the rooms on the upper floor served as a hospital. However, Malcolm Sibbald soon retired, and in 1942, Joseph Fisher went off to serve in World War II, and the hospital closed down.

The house then served as a rooming house for women working in local defense industries. It then operated for years as an apartment house with a first-floor chiropractic clinic. It was purchased in 1991 by John L. and Jacquelyn Frank, who restored the structure as a single-family home. The home was purchased in 2014 by Mark VanDeWege and Staci Gatica.

It was listed on the National Register of Historic Places on November 29, 1996.

== Description ==
The George W. Palmer House is an exceptional example of a brick Queen Anne single-family home. It is a two-story brick-clad structure sitting on a fieldstone foundation. The floorplan is fundamentally L-shaped, with the addition of a side bay and rear projection. The brickwork contains areas of offset and soldiered bricks, as well as stone window detailing and quoins, making interesting variation in color and texture. The house is topped with a hip roof with cross gables and a large gabled hood over the front facade, balanced with a smaller gabled dormer over the entrance. The gables are wooden, and finished with shingle- or stick-work; the roof is clad with lozenge-shaped asphalt shingles. Small shed-roofed porches at the front, side, and rear cover the entrances.
