= Nathan Esek and Sarah Emergene Sutton House =

- U.S. National Register of Historic Places
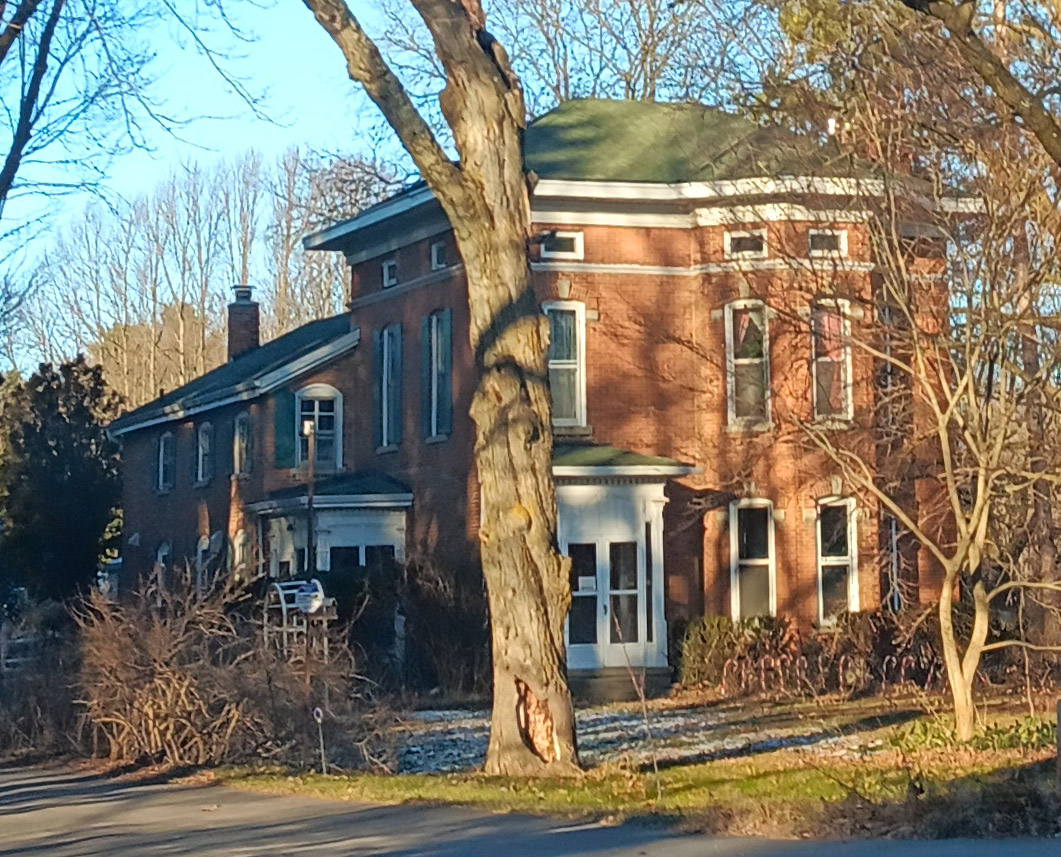
- House in 2025
- Interactive map
- Location: 5145 Pontiac Trail, Northfield Township, Michigan
- Coordinates: 42°20′52″N 83°41′54″W
- Built: 1864
- Architectural style: Italianate
- NRHP reference No.: 100007208
- Added to NRHP: January 6, 2022

The Nathan Esek and Sarah Emergene Sutton House is a single-family home located at 5145 Pontiac Trail in Northfield Township, Michigan, United States. It was listed on the National Register of Historic Places in 2022.

== History ==
In 1822, Benjamin Sutton moved from New Jersey to this location in Michigan with his wife and children, becoming the first European settler in Northfield Township. Other members of his family followed, and the Suttons farmed a number of acres in the area. In 1834, Benjamin Sutton moved to Illinois, selling his Michigan property to his father. The farmstead then passed to Benjamin's uncle George. In 1864, George Sutton's son Nathan Esek married Sarah Emergene Burlingame and purchased 140 acres of land from his father. Around that time, the new couple constructed a two-story brick house that is the core of the current structure.

The Suttons had five children, and the farm was prosperous. In about 1880 they purchased additional acreage, and also constructed an Italianate section in the front of their home. Nathan Esek Sutton died in 1904, and his wife Sarah Emergene Sutton died in 1928. The farm and house passed to their son Daniel, who served as served as Washtenaw County Sheriff. A single story rear addition was constructed in about 1940. Daniel sold the farm in 1942, and the property was subdivided, with the house passing through a series of owners until it was purchased b the present owner, Marian Klopp, in 1985.

== Description ==
The Nathan Esek and Sarah Emergene Sutton House is made up of three distinct sections: the c.1864 original house, a c.1880 front addition, and a c.1940 rear addition. The original section is a side-gabled, two-story brick structure three bays wide. The front addition is a large two-and-one-half story Italianate structure with a low-pitched hipped roof. The front facade has a small, one-story, hipped-roof porch, beside which is a full-height, projecting, semi-octagonal bay. The windows are tall, narrow one-over-one wood windows set in segmental-arch openings. The rear addition is a single-story frame structure.
