= St. John's Evangelical Lutheran Church (Ann Arbor, Michigan) =

- Saint John's Evangelical Lutheran Church, Parsonage, and Cemetery
- U.S. National Register of Historic Places
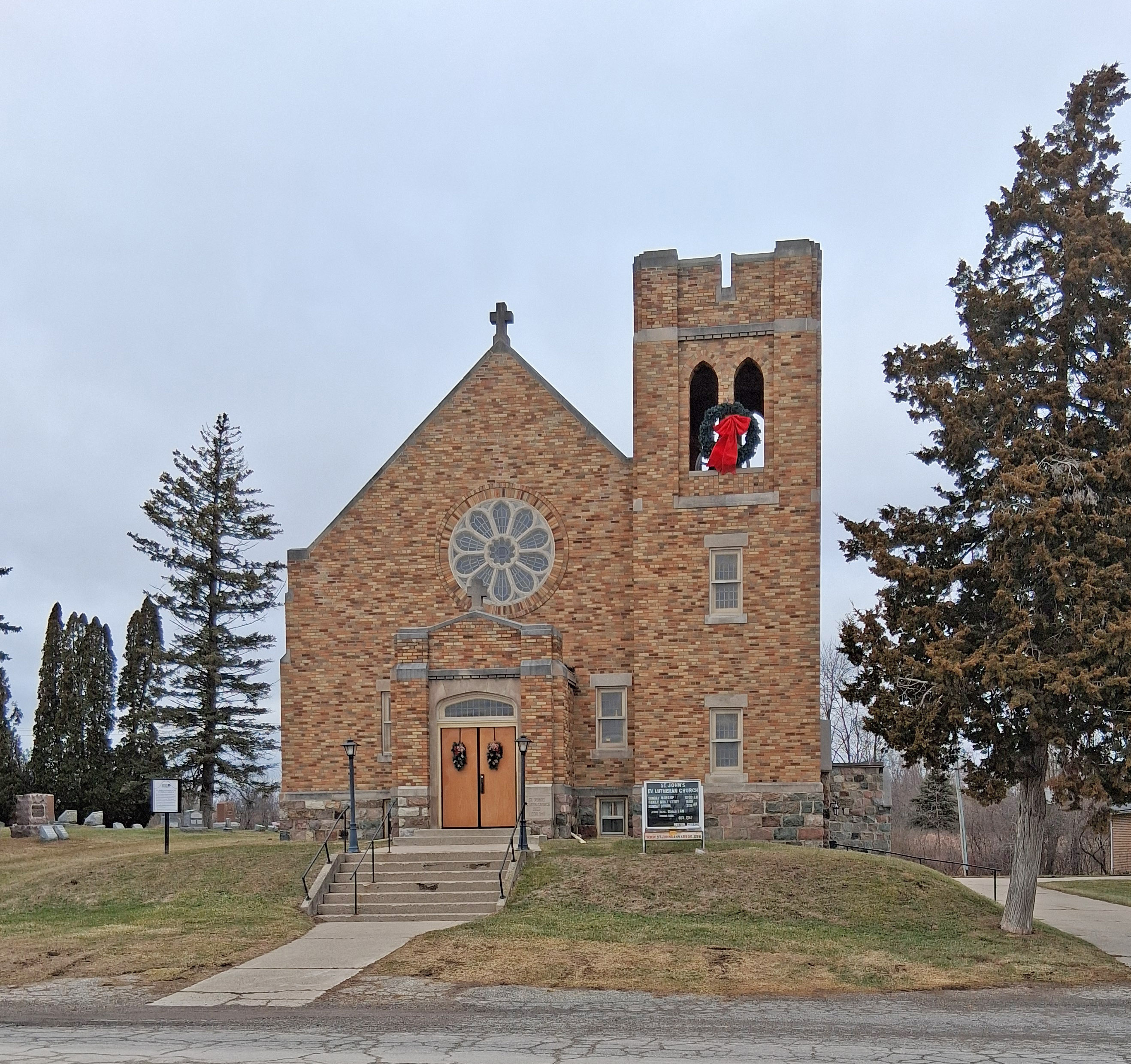
- Interactive map
- Location: 2945 East Northfield Church Rd, Northfield Township, Michigan
- Coordinates: 42°21′35″N 83°42′12″W
- Area: 4.46 acres (1.80 ha)
- Built: 1934
- Built by: Couse & McLellan, Scheel Building Co.
- Architect: Fry & Kasurin
- Architectural style: Gothic Revival, Craftsman
- NRHP reference No.: 100012315
- Added to NRHP: February 23, 2026

St. John's Evangelical Lutheran Church is a historic church complex located at 2945 East Northfield Church Road in Northfield Township, Michigan (near Ann Arbor). It was listed on the National Register of Historic Places in 2025.

== History ==
Saint John's Evangelical Lutheran Church was organized in 1869 by Reverend Friedrich Schmid to serve German immigrants in the Northfield Township area. By 1874, the congregation was ready to establish a permanent church building. They purchased the plot of land at the corner of East Northfield Church and Sutton Roads where the current church stands. The congregation laid out a cemetery and constructed a wooden church building to suit their needs.

The church continued to grow with Reverend Schmid as an itinerant pastor. In 1878, Reverend Stein became the first resident pastor, and around this time a parsonage was constructed. The congregation continued to grow, and in 1930 additional acreage was purchased to expand the cemetery. However, in 1932 a devastating fire destroyed both the church and parsonage. The congregation met in temporary quarters while planning a replacement church, and soon commissioned the Ann Arbor firm of Fry & Kasurin to design a new structure. They selected contractors Couse & McLellan to construct the church, and construction began in August 1934. The building was completed in November of the same year.

The congregation continued to use the church building after construction. It was updated with carpeting on the mid-1960s, hand paintings in 1973, a dropped ceiling in the basement in 1974, storm windows in 1980, refinished floors in 1989, an elevator in 1995, and multiple renovations in the 2000s. Saint John’s Evangelical Lutheran Church continues to be a center of the social community for the surrounding residents of Northfield Township. The church continues to hold regular worship services.

== Description ==
The grounds of St. John's Evangelical Lutheran Church contain a Gothic Revival-style church, Craftsman-style parsonage, a cemetery, and two garages. The church is a brick front-gabled structure with a square bell tower located on one corner. The front is three bays wide, with a small pointed-arch entrance flanked by double-hung windows. The tower projects slightly from the facade and contains double-hung windows on the first and second floors. Pointed arch openings in the belfry are slightly recessed and have cast stone detailing. The entire facade is dominated by an elaborate rose window in a brick surround above the entryway.

The parsonage is a side-gabled one-and-a-half-story brick house with a raised basement and full width porch. A wooden entry door is located in the center of the facade; a set of three windows are on one side and another door and a window are on the other. The cemetery is just west of the church and contains almost 400 burial sites, ranging from the 1870s to the present.
