= Schuyler Mill – Ford Soybean Plant Complex =

- U.S. National Register of Historic Places
- U.S. Historic district
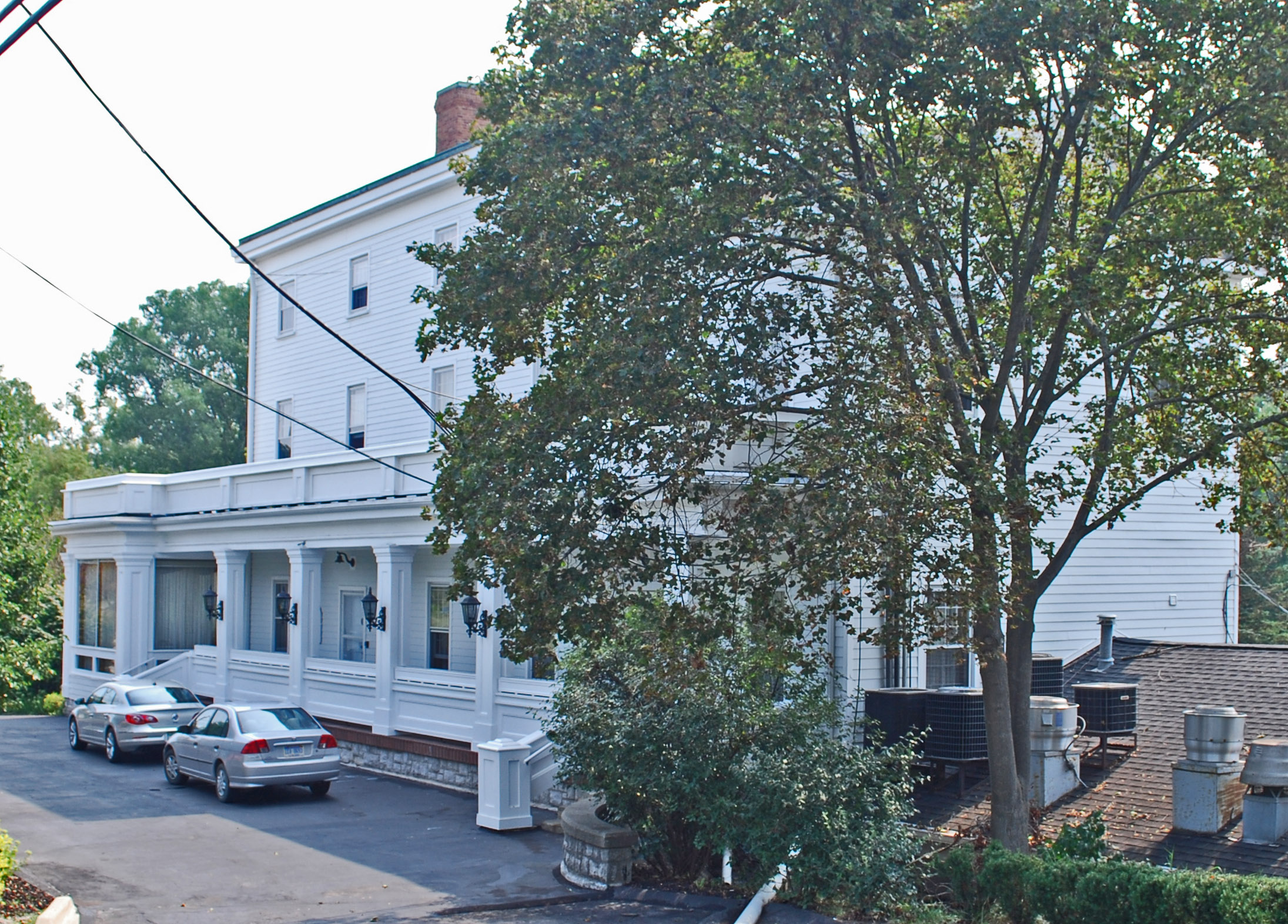

- Location within Michigan Location within the United States
- Interactive map
- Location: 555--600 Michigan Ave., Saline, Michigan
- Coordinates: 42°9′46″N 83°47′23″W
- Area: 11.5 acres (4.7 ha)
- Built: 1845
- Architectural style: Greek Revival, Classical Revival
- NRHP reference No.: 96000477
- Added to NRHP: May 08, 1996

The Schuyler Mill, also known as the Ford Soybean Plant Complex, is an old mill site that Henry Ford turned into one of his small village industry factories. It is located at 555-600 Michigan Avenue in Saline, Michigan, and was listed on the National Register of Historic Places in 1996.

== History ==
In 1845, David Schuyler Haywood constructed a gristmill at this site on the western edge of Saline, Michigan. A small settlement, Barnegat, soon coalesced around the mill site; Barnegat was annexed by the village of Saline in 1848. However, by 1865, business declined, and the mill was soon closed.

Henry Ford purchased the site in 1936, refurbished it, and opened it as a soybean processing plant in 1938. The site employed up to 19 people, who removed the soybean oil from the beans, which was processed into plastics and paint. The residuals were used to make casting cores or for cattle feed. In 1943, Ford moved a one-room Greek Revival schoolhouse to the site and refurbished it as a residence. However, the plant was closed in 1947, not long after Henry Ford's death.

After its closure, the building was used by a private soybean processing firm. However, the processing equipment was soon obsolete, and in 1962, the property was turned into an antique shop and general store, know first as the "Sauk Trail Inn". and later as "Weller's Country Store." More recently, part of the structure has been used as a cafe and a banquet facility.

== Description ==
The Schuyler Mill/Ford Soybean Plant Complex sits on 11-1/2 acres in a park-like setting. It consists primarily of the original 1845 mill and the ancillary fieldstone-lined millrace. The mill is a three-story timber-framed gable-roofed Greek Revival building covered with clapboard. A smaller two-story wing sits to one side; it is flanked by two single-story wings. Across the street sits a modern residence built around the old schoolhouse.

In addition, Ford built four more structures: a Greek Revival-style extractor plant and a pump house near the mill, and two storage buildings near the mill. In addition, Ford constructed a dam and spillway at the mill pond.
