= Oakwood Cemetery Mausoleum =

- U.S. National Register of Historic Places
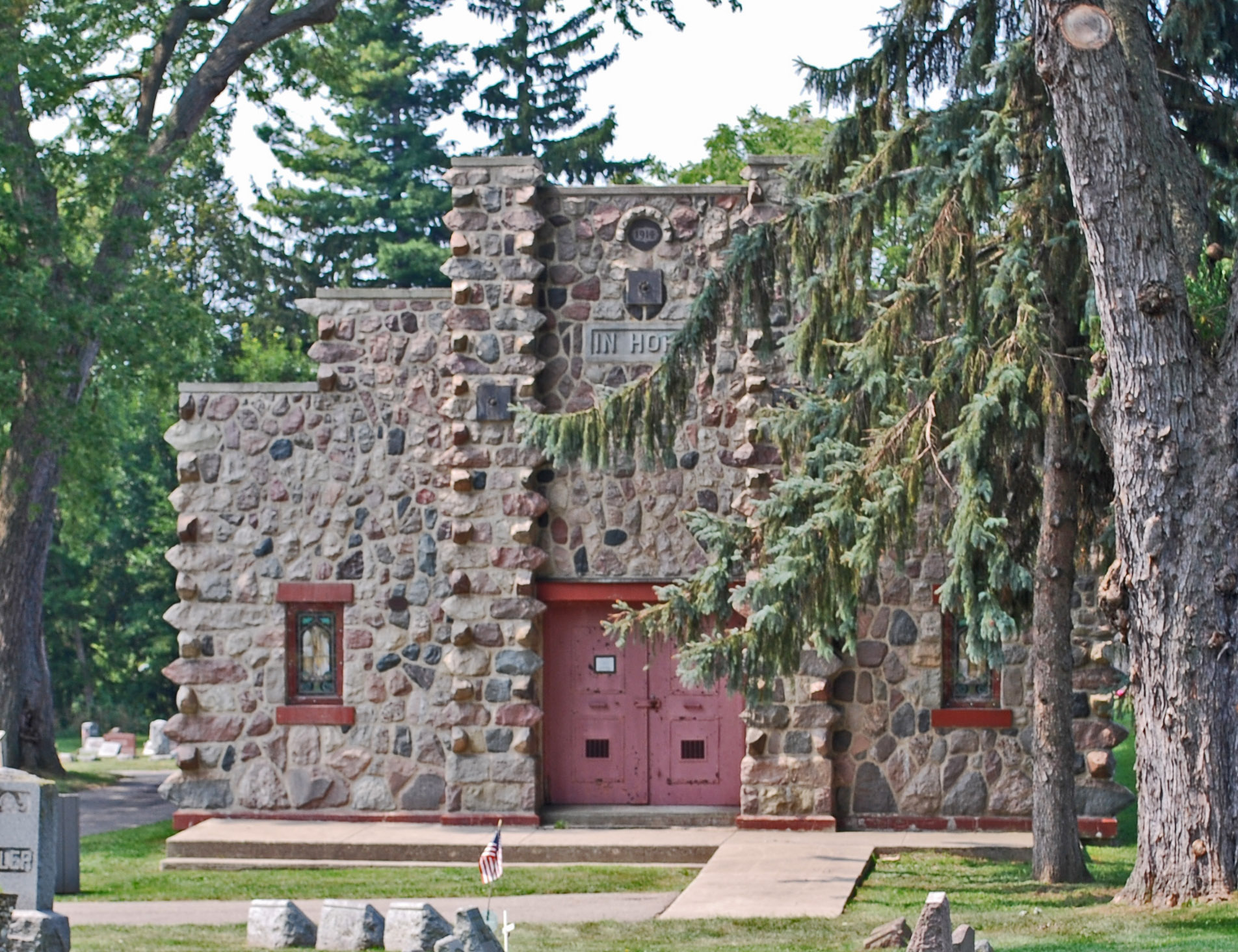
- Interactive map
- Location: Saline, Michigan
- Coordinates: 42°09′49″N 83°47′06″W
- Area: less than one acre
- Built: 1914
- Built by: O.J. McBride Co.
- MPS: Saline MRA
- NRHP reference No.: 85003047
- Added to NRHP: October 10, 1985

The Oakwood Cemetery Mausoleum is a cemetery structure located in the Oakwood Cemetery in Saline, Michigan. The mausoleum was listed on the National Register of Historic Places in 1985.

== History ==
During the original platting of Saline, land that is now Oakwood Cemetery was set aside for use as a burial ground. In 1913, J.W. Flowers of Toledo, Ohio purchased this land at the Oakwood Cemetery to construct a mausoleum. In 1914, the Board of Trustees for Oakwood Cemetery agreed to design and build the mausoleum, while Flowers would sell the interior chambers. The Board of Trustees contracted with the Washtenaw Mausoleum Company for this building, which was constructed by the O.J. McBride Company. The building was completed in 1915.

== Description ==
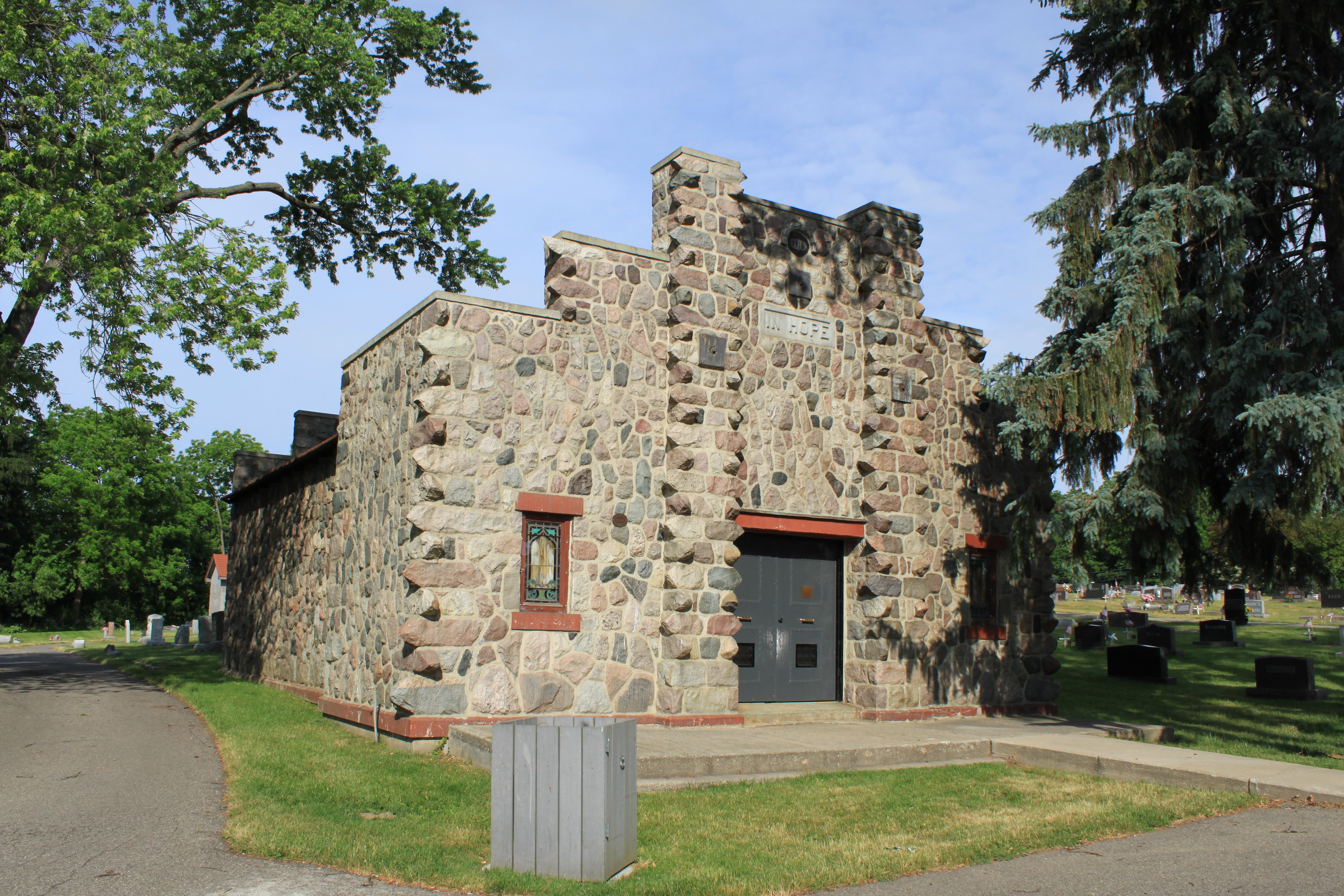

The Oakwood Cemetery Mausoleum is single story mausoleum constructed of pink, grey, and black fieldstone with grey mortar. The building measures 30 feet by 45 feet. The main facades are terraced, and it has a red tiled monitor roof containing small rectangular windows. The main facade contains small stained glass windows and metal doors, with the inscription "In Hope" carved in a sandstone block above. A heart-shaped stone tops the inscription, and three decorative metal plates are set in the stone. The facade edges and entrance are emphasized with projecting stonework. The opposite facade also includes stained glass windows and metal decorations. The interior floor is marble, and the mausoleum contains space for 88 to 100 burials.
