= Union Block (Saline, Michigan) =

- U.S. National Register of Historic Places
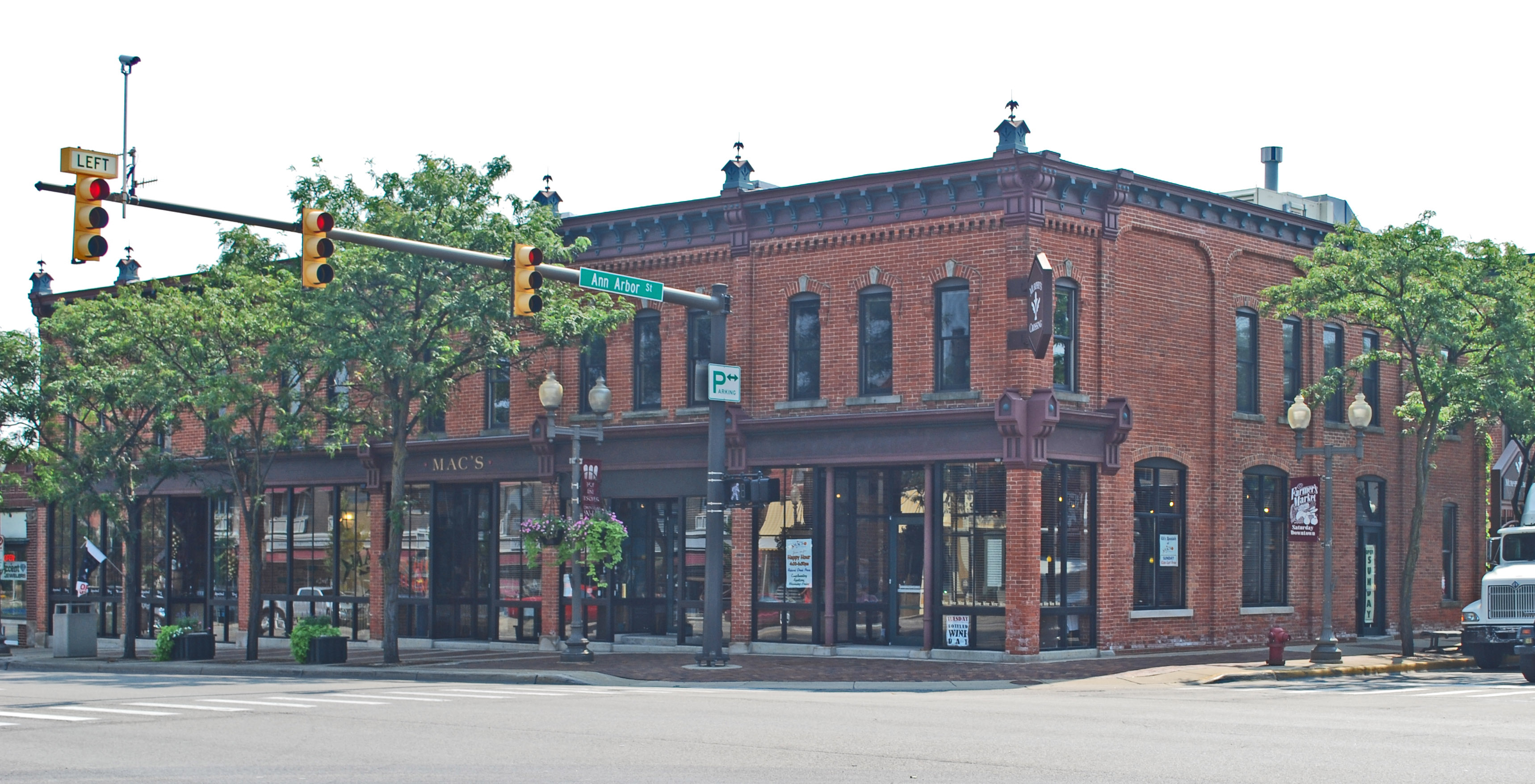
- Interactive map
- Location: 100-110 E. Michigan Ave., Saline, Michigan
- Coordinates: 42°09′59″N 83°46′51″W
- Area: less than one acre
- Built: c. 1877
- Architectural style: Italianate
- MPS: Saline MRA
- NRHP reference No.: 85002962
- Added to NRHP: October 10, 1985

The Union Block is a commercial building located at 100-110 East Michigan Avenue in Saline, Michigan. It was listed on the National Register of Historic Places in 1985.

== History ==
It is unclear when the Union Block was constructed, but it was almost certainly between 1872 and 1882. The building appears to have been constructed in two parts: The western two bays (on the corner) and the eastern four bays. Land speculator Henry J. Miller purchased the western, corner lot in 1871. By 1880 he had constructed two buildings: the current two-bay portion of the Union Block, and another brick building around the corner on Ann Arbor Street (which was destroyed by fire in 1881). The eastern section of the building was purchased by Sherman Hinckley in 1877; Hinckley likely constructed the eastern section shortly thereafter.

By 1879, Miller and Hinckley co-owned a store in one bay of the building, and Hinckley apparently purchased the entire building at some point. He owned it until his death in 1891. Throughout the years, the Union Block has housed a variety of commercial stores on the ground floor and offices on the second. Stores in the building have included a harness shop, jewelry store, drug store, post office, general store, meat market, and Salvation Army.

== Description ==
The Union Block is a two-story, six-bay, rectangular red brick Italianate commercial building. It measures 132 feet by 60 feet, and occupies a corner lot, fronting directly onto the sidewalk. Bays are divided by brick pilasters topped by decorative capitals. The two sections of the building have slightly different windows and differing secondary cornice line. Three rectangular windows topped by brick hoodmolds and keystones are in each of the west two bays, while two rectangular windows topped by brick hoodmolds without keystones are in each of the east four bays. Dentillated brickwork and an ornamental bracketed cornice top the structure; the original secondary cornice has been removed.

The western facade, along Ann Arbor Street, contains a fire escape, more windows, and entrances on both stories. In the rear is a two-story wooden porch running along the length of the building.
