= Michigan's 52nd House of Representatives district =

American legislative district

Michigan's 52nd State House of Representatives district
Representative
| Mike Harris; R–Waterford Township |
- Demographics: 83.2% White; 3.1% Black; 6.4% Hispanic; 1.7% Asian; 0.2% Native American; 0.1% Hawaiian/Pacific Islander; 0.2% Other; 5.2% Multiracial
- Population (2024): 89,487

Michigan's 52nd House of Representatives district is a legislative district within the Michigan House of Representatives located in Oakland County. The district was created in 1965, when the Michigan Supreme Court ordered the reapportionment of state legislative districts from a county-based system to a proportional one following the Supreme Court case Reynolds v. Sims. It is currently represented by Republican Mike Harris of Waterford Township.

== List of representatives ==
| Representative | Party | Years | Residence | Notes |
|---|---|---|---|---|
| Charles F. Gray | Democratic | 1965–1966 | Ypsilanti | |
| Roy Smith | Republican | 1967–1972 | Ypsilanti | |
| Raymond J. Smit | Republican | 1973–1974 | Ann Arbor | |
| Roy Smith | Republican | 1975–1982 | Ypsilanti | Lived in Ann Arbor from around 1975 to 1976 and Saline from around 1977 to 1978. |
| Margaret O'Connor | Republican | 1983–1992 | Ann Arbor | |
| Mary B. Schroer | Democratic | 1993–1998 | Ann Arbor | |
| John P. Hansen | Democratic | 1999–2002 | Dexter | |
| Gene DeRossett | Republican | 2003–2004 | Manchester | |
| Pam Byrnes | Democratic | 2005–2010 | Chelsea | |
| Mark Ouimet | Republican | 2011–2012 | Scio | |
| Gretchen Driskell | Democratic | 2013–2016 | Saline | |
| Donna Lasinski | Democratic | 2017–2022 | Ann Arbor | Lived in Scio Township until around 2019. |
| Mike Harris | Republican | 2023–present | Waterford | Redistricted from the 43rd district. |

== Historical district boundaries ==
| Map | Description | Apportionment Plan | Notes |
|---|---|---|---|
| | Washtenaw County (part): Augusta Township; Northfield Township; Salem Township; Superior Township; Webster Township; York Township; Ypsilanti; Ypsilanti Township | 1964 Apportionment Plan | |
| | Monroe County (part): Milan (part); Washtenaw County (part): Ann Arbor (part); Ann Arbor Township (part); Augusta Township; Milan (part); Pittsfield Township (part); Salem Township; Saline; Superior Township; York Township; Wayne County (part): Plymouth Township (part) | 1972 Apportionment Plan | |
| | Washtenaw County (part): Ann Arbor (part); Augusta Township; Bridgewater Township; Dexter Township; Freedom Township; Lima Township; Lodi Township; Lyndon Township; Manchester Township; Milan; Pittsfield Township; Saline; Saline Township; Scio Township; Sharon Township; Sylvan Township; York Township | 1982 Apportionment Plan | |
| | Washtenaw County (part): Ann Arbor (part); Ann Arbor Township (part); Dexter Township; Lima Township; Lyndon Township; Northfield Township; Scio Township; Sylvan Township; Webster Township | 1992 Apportionment Plan | |
| | Washtenaw County (part): Ann Arbor (part); Ann Arbor Township (part); Bridgewater Township; Dexter Township; Freedom Township; Lima Township; Lodi Township; Lyndon Township; Manchester Township; Northfield Township; Pittsfield Township (part); Saline; Saline Township (part); Scio Township (part); Sharon Township; Sylvan Township; Webster Township | 2001 Apportionment Plan | |
| | Washtenaw County (part): Ann Arbor (part); Bridgewater Township; Chelsea; Dexter Township; Freedom Township; Lima Township; Lodi Township; Lyndon Township; Manchester Township; Northfield Township; Pittsfield Township (part); Salem Township; Saline; Saline Township; Scio Township (part); Sharon Township; Sylvan Township; Webster Township | 2011 Apportionment Plan | |
| | Oakland County (part): Independence Township; Lake Angelus; Springfield Township (part); Clarkston; Waterford Township (part) | 2021 Apportionment Plan (Note: Referred to as the Hickory plan.) | |

== Recent elections ==
=== 2020s ===
2026 Michigan House of Representatives election
| Party | Candidate | Votes | % |
|---|---|---|---|
| Republican | Mike Harris (incumbent) | 27,677 | 56.99 |
| Democratic | Brendan P. Leddy | 20,876 | 43.01 |
| Total votes | | 48,543 | 100 |
| Republican hold | | | |

2024 Michigan House of Representatives election
| Party | Candidate | Votes | % |
|---|---|---|---|
| Republican | Mike Harris (incumbent) | 34,810 | 62.03 |
| Democratic | Caroline Dargay | 21,304 | 37.97 |
| Total votes | | 56,114 | 100 |
| Republican hold | | | |

2022 Michigan House of Representatives election
| Party | Candidate | Votes | % |
|---|---|---|---|
| Republican | Mike Harris | 26,890 | 58.56 |
| Democratic | Robin McGregor | 19,031 | 41.44 |
| Total votes | | 45,921 | 100 |
| Republican gain from Democratic | | | |

2020 Michigan House of Representatives election
| Party | Candidate | Votes | % |
|---|---|---|---|
| Democratic | Donna Lasinski (incumbent) | 35,985 | 58.99 |
| Republican | Greg Marquis | 25,022 | 41.01 |
| Total votes | | 61,007 | 100 |
| Democratic hold | | | |

=== 2010s ===
2018 Michigan House of Representatives election
| Party | Candidate | Votes | % |
|---|---|---|---|
| Democratic | Donna Lasinski | 30,089 | 60.5 |
| Republican | Teri Aiuto | 19,589 | 39.4 |
| Write-in candidate | Teresa Spiegelberg | 35 | 0.1 |
| Total votes | | 49,713 | 100 |
| Democratic hold | | | |

2016 Michigan House of Representatives election
| Party | Candidate | Votes | % |
|---|---|---|---|
| Democratic | Donna Lasinski | 27,620 | 52.4 |
| Republican | Randy Clark | 23,535 | 44.67 |
| Green | Eric Borregard | 1,519 | 2.9 |
| Total votes | | 52,674 | 100 |
| Democratic hold | | | |

2014 Michigan House of Representatives election
| Party | Candidate | Votes | % |
|---|---|---|---|
| Democratic | Gretchen Driskell | 20,844 | 56.2 |
| Republican | John Hochstetler | 16,263 | 43.8 |
| Total votes | | 37,107 | 100 |
| Democratic hold | | | |

2012 Michigan House of Representatives election
| Party | Candidate | Votes | % |
|---|---|---|---|
| Democratic | Gretchen Driskell | 26,647 | 53.0 |
| Republican | Mark Ouimet | 23,610 | 47.0 |
| Total votes | | 50,257 | 100 |
| Democratic gain from Republican | | | |

2010 Michigan House of Representatives election
| Party | Candidate | Votes | % |
|---|---|---|---|
| Republican | Mark Ouimet | 21,462 | 51.7 |
| Democratic | Christine Green | 20,027 | 48.3 |
| Total votes | | 41,489 | 100 |
| Republican gain from Democratic | | | |

2008 Michigan House of Representatives election
| Party | Candidate | Votes | % |
|---|---|---|---|
| Democratic | Pam Byrnes | 35,954 | 63.0 |
| Republican | Eric Lielbriedis | 19,179 | 33.6 |
| Libertarian | John Boyle | 1,981 | 3.5 |
| Total votes | | 57,114 | 100 |
| Democratic hold | | | |
