= John P. Hansen =

American politician

Member of the Michigan House of Representatives from the 52nd district
- In office January 1, 1999 – December 31, 2002
- Preceded by: Mary B. Schroer
- Succeeded by: Gene DeRossett

Personal details
- Born: July 9, 1943 (age 83)
- Party: Democratic
- Spouse: Sandra
- Children: 1
- Education: University of Michigan

John P. Hansen (born July 9, 1943) was a Michigan politician.

== Early life ==
Hansen was born on July 9, 1943.

== Education ==
Hansen earned a B.A. in science education, an M.A. in guidance and counseling, and a Ph.D. in school law, all from the University of Michigan.

== Career ==
Hansen used to work as a teacher. Hansen served as superintendent of Dexter Community Schools from 1984 to 1998. Hansen worked as a part-time professor at Eastern Michigan University. Hansen served as a member of the Dexter Village Council. On November 3, 1998, Curtis was elected to the Michigan House of Representatives where he represented the 52nd district from January 13, 1999, to December 31, 2002. Starting on January 20, 2012, Hansen served as interim city manager of Ypsilanti, Michigan after the previous city manager, Ed Koryzno, stepped down from the position. In February 2012, Hansen resigned from the position, leaving Ypsilanti city clerk Frances McMullan to serve as acting city manager during the vacancy he left.

== Personal life ==
Hansen married Sandra and had one daughter.
