= Mark Ouimet =

Mark Ouimet may refer to:

- Mark Ouimet (ice hockey)
- Mark Ouimet (politician)
