= Gretchen Driskell =

American politician and businesswoman

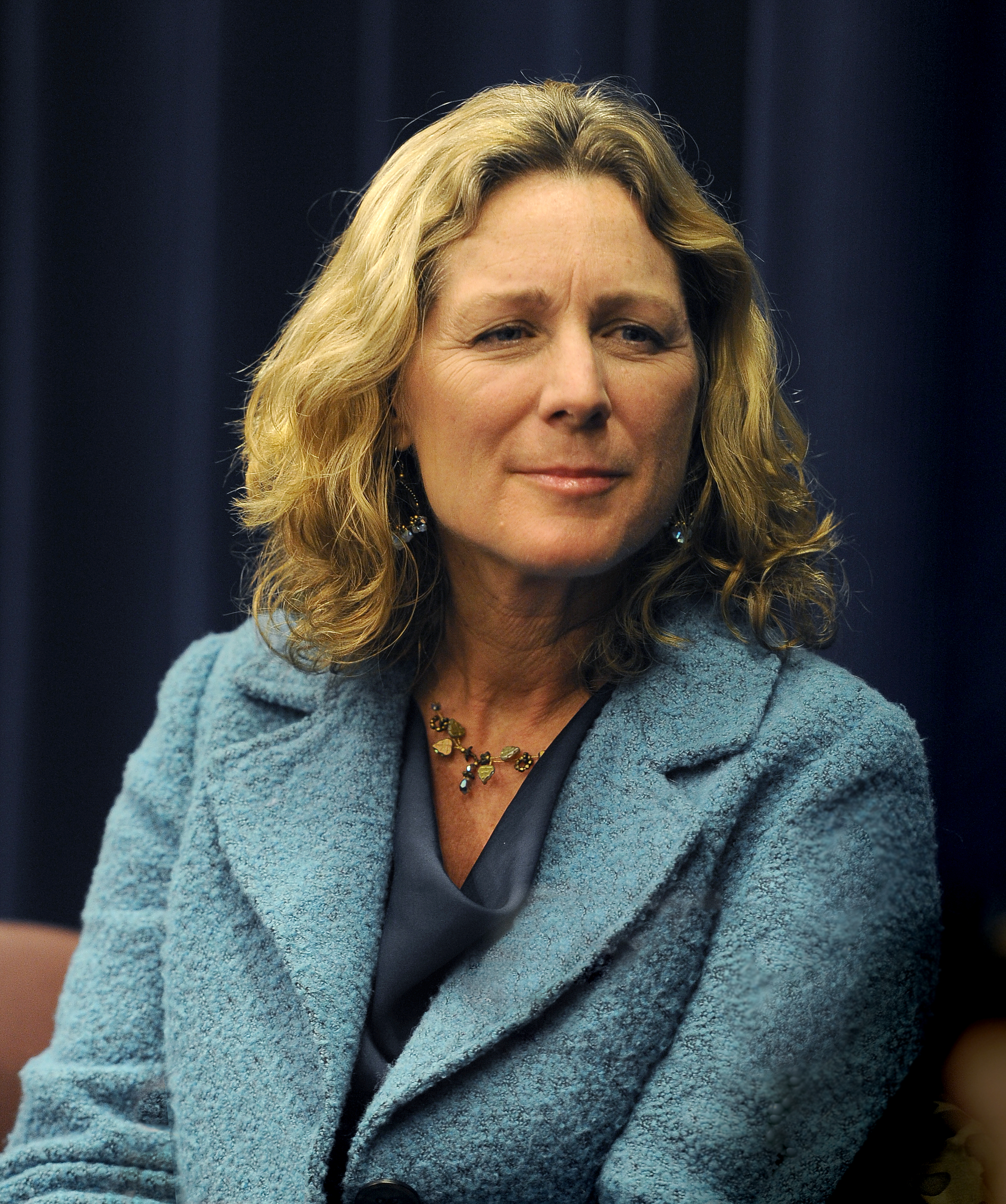
- Driskell in 2014

Member of the Michigan House of Representatives from the 52nd district
- In office January 1, 2013 – December 31, 2016
- Preceded by: Mark Ouimet
- Succeeded by: Donna Lasinski

Personal details
- Born: October 1, 1958 (age 67) Port Washington, New York, U.S.
- Party: Democratic
- Children: 3
- Education: University of Lynchburg (BSc); George Washington University (MBA)
- Website: Official website

Gretchen Demarest Driskell (born October 1, 1958) is an American politician, accountant, and real estate agent from the state of Michigan. A member of the Democratic Party, she served in the Michigan House of Representatives, representing the 52nd district. Before her time in the Michigan legislature, she was the first female mayor of Saline, Michigan, a position she held for 14 years.

== Michigan House of Representatives ==
=== Elections ===
Driskell challenged Republican incumbent Mark Ouimet for the 52nd House district (northern and western suburban Washtenaw County areas outside Ann Arbor) in 2012. She defeated Ouimet, receiving 26,646 votes (52.9%) to his 23,609 (46.8%). In 2014, Driskell defeated Republican nominee John Hochstetler, receiving 20,849 votes (56.2%) to his 16,265 (43.8%).

== U.S. House of Representatives elections ==
=== 2016 ===
In February 2015 Driskell announced that she would challenge Republican incumbent Tim Walberg for Michigan's 7th congressional district. In a March 2015 Inside Michigan Politics/Revsix/Change Media poll, Driskell led Walberg 42%-37% with 21% undecided. In a September 2015 Harper Polling poll, Walberg led Driskell 49%-32% with 20% undecided. Driskell was endorsed by former Republican governor William Milliken, who also endorsed Hillary Clinton.

In the general election, Driskell lost to Walberg, who received 55% of the vote to Driskell's 40%.

=== 2018 ===
In December 2017, Driskell announced she would run against Walberg again. She faced a challenge in the Democratic primary from Steve Friday, a progressive grassroots activist from Dexter. Driskell won the nomination easily. She lost to Walberg again, 54% to 46%.

Michigan House of Representatives
Preceded by Mark Ouimet	Member of the Michigan House of Representatives from the 52nd district 2013–2016	Succeeded by Donna Lasinski
