= Groves Farm =

- U.S. National Register of Historic Places
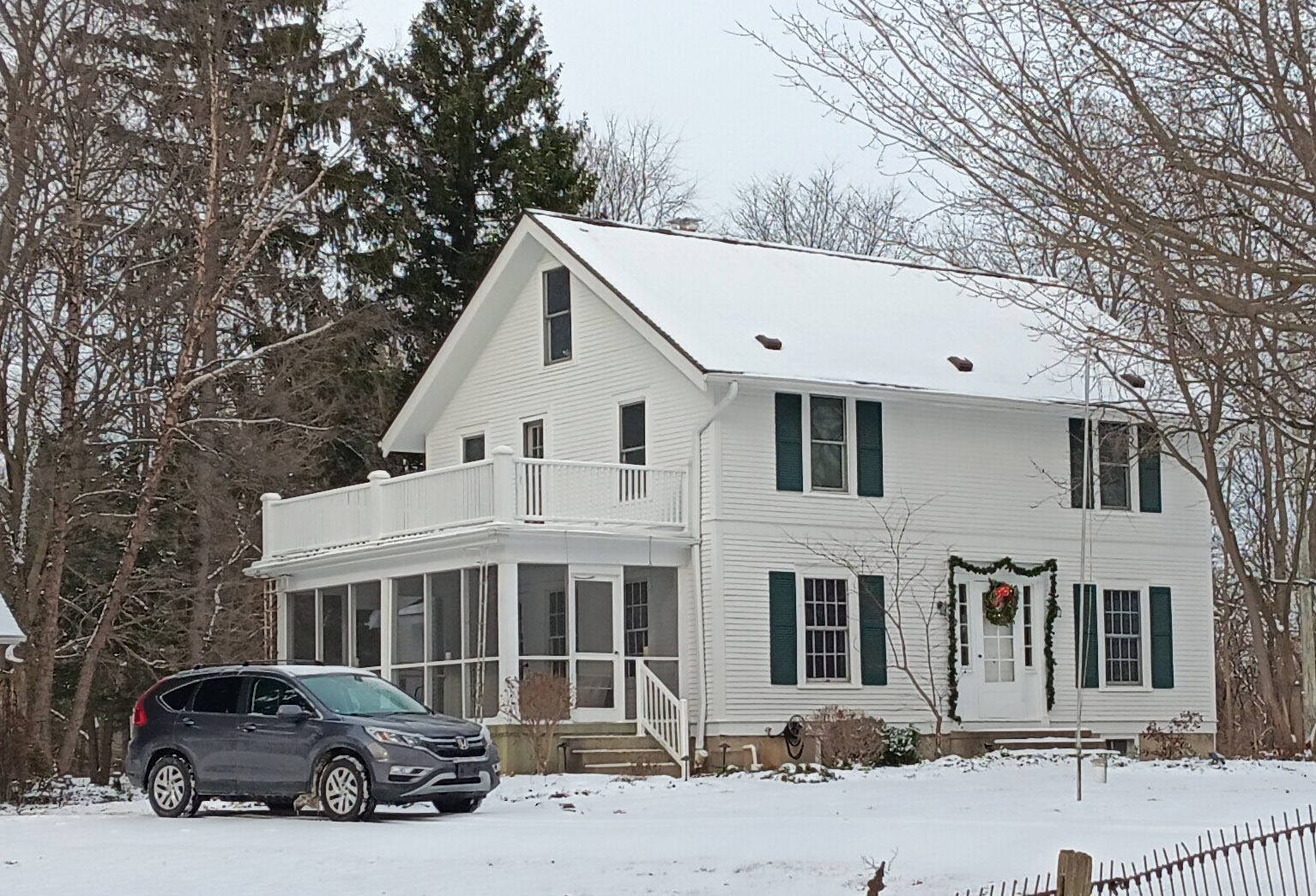
- Farmhouse, 2025
- Interactive map
- Location: 6015 Sutton Road, Northfield Township, Michigan
- Coordinates: 42°21′56″N 83°42′9″W
- Built: 1846
- Architect: Hascal Laraway and Philander Murray; William Nimke; Thomas Taylor; Jay Pray & Lewis Weisemeyer
- Architectural style: Colonial Revival
- NRHP reference No.: 100009651
- Added to NRHP: December 26, 2022

Groves Farm is a farmstead located at 6015 Sutton Road in Northfield Township, Michigan, United States. It was listed on the National Register of Historic Places in 2023.

== History ==
Nicholas Groves was born in 1788 in Whitingham, Vermont. Groves helped his father manage the family farm, but after the death of his father and stepmother, he decided to move west. In 1831 he travelled to Michigan and purchased 160 acres in Northfield Township. Later that year he brought his second wife and three children from his first marriage to Michigan. They arrived in December 1831 and began establishing a farmstead, while staying with a neighbor. Within a few weeks, Groves had constructed a log cabin on his property.

The Groves family participated in local politics, with Nicholas Groves elected overseer of the poor in 1832 and his son, William P. Groves, appointed local postmaster in 1849. In 1846, the family constructed a new frame house, after which the older log cabin was demolished. A dairy barn was built the same year. In 1847, Nicholas Groves transferred the property ownership to William P. Groves, although he continued to live at the property until his death in 1866. William married in 1851, and eventually had six children. As the family grew, the house was enlarged, with a west wing added in 1856 and a south wing in 1864. Additional outbuildings were also constructed in the 1850s, and a large animal barn was moved from another farmstead onto the Groves property. A corn crib was constructed in 1864 and a horse barn in 1872.

In 1886 William P. Groves's son Albert D. Groves married and soon moved into the family farm with his wife. The farmhouse was enlarged again in 1888. When he died in 1899, William P. Groves left the farm to his son, Albert, and his brother, Edwin W. Groves. Edwin died in 1915 and Albert's son William T. Groves purchased his share of the farm. In 1907 the Groves family moved to Ann Arbor and leased the farm to Martin Wurster, a German immigrant. A number of improvements were made to the farm while the Wursters were tenants. Most significantly, in 1922 the house was completely demolished by fire, and a new one was constructed. In 1924, Albert D. Groves died; his son William T. Groves inherited the farm. The Wursters continued as tenants until 1938, after which William's brother-in-law, Irwin Harrington, leased the farm until 1940.

William T. Groves returned to the farm in 1941 with his wife and mother-in-law, but died unexpectedly in 1943. The house was vacant for the next decade until his son, William A. Groves, married and moved in during 1952. In 1961 the family moved to Ann Arbor and leased the acreage to the Maulbetsch family. In 1962, the Caskey family purchased the house and a 2.3 acre section of property. In 1968, the Caskeys sold the property to Nancy and Fred LaPointe, who also purchased the barns and an additional 2.6 acres from the Groves family. In 1972, the LaPointes sold the farmstead to Sally and Dean Louis. The remainder of the original Groves farm was subdivided and sold in the 1980s and 1990s. As of 2023, Sally Louis owns the farmhouse and associated outbuildings.

== Description ==
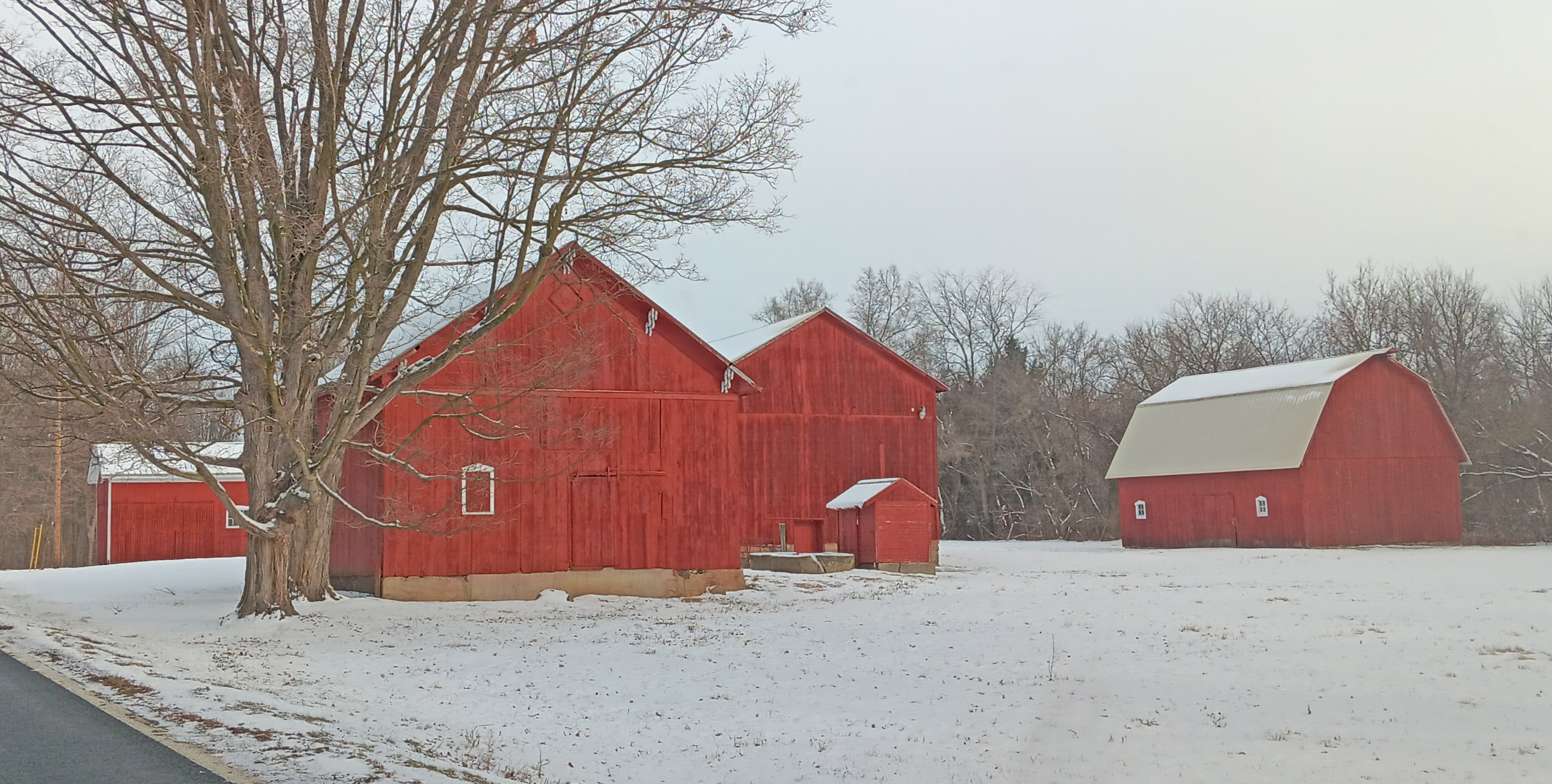
Complex of farm buildings

The Groves farmstead is a complex of nine related buildings and structures on about five acres on both sides of Sutton Road. Generally, the domestic buildings are on one side of the road and agricultural buildings are on the other. The buildings include the 1922 Groves farmhouse, as well as a 1846 dairy barn, c. 1850 sheep barn, 1864 corn crib, 1872 horse barn, 1846 well, 1917 pump house, and a c. 1950 garage. The property also contains a wrought-iron fence and an heirloom New England sundial.

The Groves farmhouse is a two-and-one-half-story, side-gable house constructed in 1922. It is a plain symmetrical building with a center entrance and a small center gable. It was updated in 1940 to include Colonial Revival detailing.

The dairy barn in a large frame structure with a side-gabled roof. The sheep barn is a gambrel-roof building with a metal roof and vertical board siding. The corn crib is a slightly tapered, gabled building sitting on brick piers. The horse barn is a front-gable building with vertical board siding. The pump house is a small, gabled building with wood siding.
