= Martha Waldron Janes =

Biographical summary

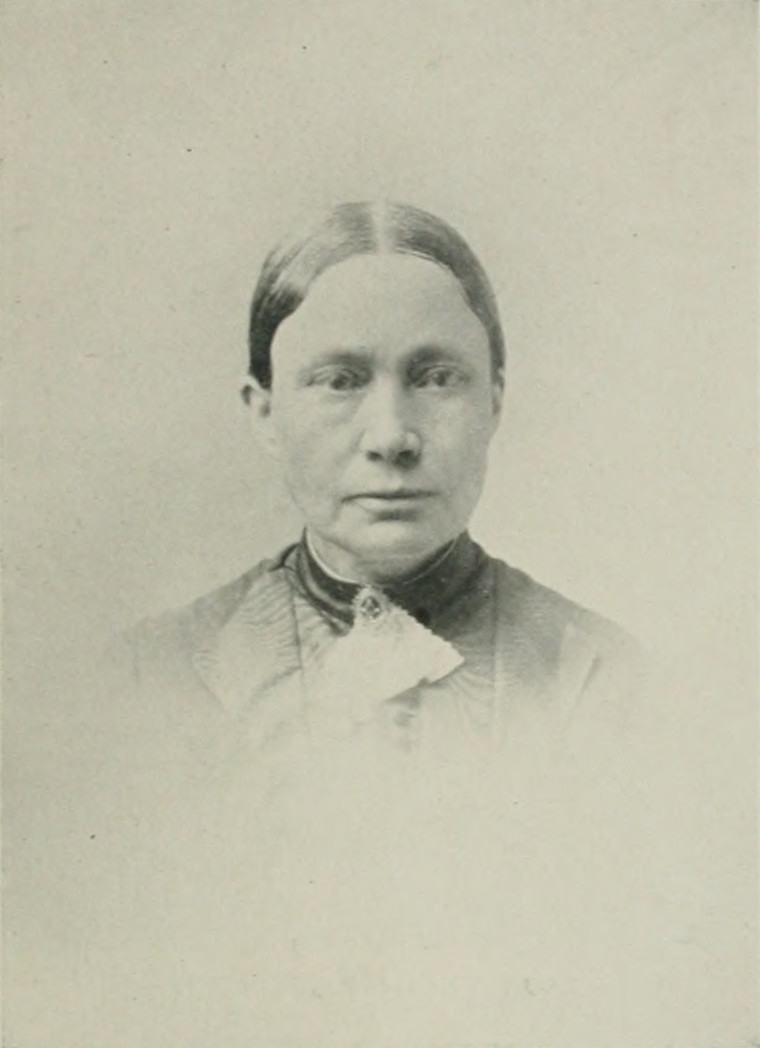
- Photo in A Woman of the Century
- Born: Martha Waldron; June 9, 1832; Northfield, Michigan, U.S.
- Died: May 22, 1913 (aged 80); Muskegon, Michigan, U.S.
- Occupations: minister; social reformer; columnist
- Spouses: John Allen Sober (m. 1852; died 1864); Henry H. Janes (m. 1867; died 1886)
- Children: 3

Martha Waldron Janes (née Waldron; after first marriage, Sober; after second marriage, Janes; June 9, 1832 – May 22, 1913) was an American minister, social reformer, and columnist of the long nineteenth century. Born in Michigan, she was converted when very young. Her religious zeal was so conspicuous that many questioned her sanity. She preached for some time from the pulpits of the Free Baptist Church, before becoming regularly ordained in 1868, being the first woman ordained in that conference. The denomination espoused more egalitarian views than others of the time, which matched well with Janes' convictions regarding social reform. She opposed prescriptive gender beliefs regarding limitations on educational opportunities for girls. At a young age, she embraced women's suffrage and wrote columns on the topic for seventeen weekly papers. She was also actively engaged in temperance work.

== Early life and education ==
Martha "Jane" Waldron was born in Northfield, Michigan, June 9, 1832. Her father, Leonard T. Waldron, was a native of Massachusetts. In 1830, he went to Michigan, bought a farm, married and became a successful farmer. He was an enthusiastic advocate of the free school movement and worked and voted for it, after he had paid for his own children's education. His ancestors came from Holland and settled in New Holland, now Harlem, New York, in 1816. Her mother, Nancy Bennett, was a native of New York City.

Janes was the oldest of seven children. Her opportunities for education were limited by where she lived. All her school advantages were secured by doing housework at US$1 a week and saving the money to pay her tuition in a select school for one term.

At the age of thirteen, she was converted and joined the Free Baptist Church. She took part in public meetings, praying and exhorting. Because, at that time, a woman's voice had not been heard in the frontier churches, she earned the reputation of being crazy.

== Career ==
On October 12, 1852, she married John Allen Sober, a young minister, fully cognizant of the times in the many reforms that agitated the public. Widowed on November 19, 1864, she was in poor health, and left to raise two children, Evangeline "Eva" Sober (b. 1853) and Arthur Sober.

The conviction that she ought to preach the gospel dated almost to the time of her conversion. Her duty and ability to enter that untried and forbidden field were long recognized by the church and conference to which she belonged, and she was encouraged to do what the church felt was her duty. In 1860, after much thought, she began to preach, and her work in the pulpit was considered successful. On May 23, 1867, she remarried. Her second husband was Rev. Henry H. Janes (1818–1886). They had one child, a son, Charles Wesley Janes (1862–1926). (Note: According to Riker (1904), Martha and Henry did not have any children.)

In June 1868, she was ordained, being the first woman ordained in the Free Baptist Church conference. She administered all the rites of the church except immersion, which she has never felt called to do. She had the care of a church as its pastor on several occasions, and traveled extensively under the auspices of the conference as evangelist. By 1880, Janes and her husband had separated; she followed Eva to Clay County, Iowa, and he followed a daughter from an earlier relationship. He died in 1886.

Janes became district superintendent of franchise of the Woman's Suffrage Association, during which time she edited a suffrage column in seventeen weekly papers. She also held meetings in the interest of that reform. Her temperance work dates back to 1879. She was county president of Clay County, Iowa, and organized every township in that county.

== Death ==
Martha Waldron Janes died in Muskegon, Michigan on May 22, 1913, and was buried there.
