= The Sun Times News =

Weekly newspaper in Michigan, US

- Type: Weekly newspaper
- Owner: The Really Useful Information Company (TRUiC)
- Founder: Bob Nestor
- Editor: Doug Marrin
- Founded: 2008
- Language: English
- Headquarters: 8123 Main St, Suite 200, Dexter, Michigan
- Country: United States
- Circulation: 32,000 (free distribution)
- Website: thesuntimesnews.com

The Sun Times News is a weekly newspaper serving the Chelsea, Dexter, and Saline communities of Washtenaw County, Michigan. Its origins lie in the Stockbridge Brief-Sun, a paper formed in 1907 following the combination of two Stockbridge papers, the Brief and Sun.

== History ==
The Sun Times was created in 2008 when Michigan native Bob Nestor purchased the Stockbridge Town Crier and expanded its focus to serve communities across Washtenaw County in Southeast Michigan, like Dexter, Chelsea, and Saline.

In 2013, the Dexter village council voted 4–3 to designate the Sun Times as the village's newspaper of record, transferring publication of meeting minutes and certain public notices from the now-defunct Dexter Leader.

By 2015, the Sun Times was delivered weekly to 25,000 households.

In 2017, the Sun Times stopped covering the Stockbridge area, with Nestor deciding to focus the paper's coverage on Dexter, Chelsea, and Saline. The decision cut the Sun-Times' distribution from 25,000 to 18,000.

According to the Ann Arbor Observer, the paper faced financial difficulties during the COVID-19 pandemic and almost closed. Chuck Colby assumed management of the paper from Bob Nester, and following a two-and-a-half-month hiatus, a redesigned Sun Times under Colby was first published on September 30, 2020.

In 2023, Colby told the Ann Arbor Observer that he had plans to expand coverage into Pinckney and Milan and split The Sun Times News into separate publications serving individual cities and communities to “offer better coverage of local news.”

Experiencing continued rising costs and financial challenges, the Sun Times was sold to The Really Useful Information Company (TRUiC), a media and tech company headquartered in Ann Arbor, in 2025. Colby remained a minority owner of the paper following the sale. The paper's editorial leadership and reporting staff remained in place following the sale, with TRUiC assuming responsibility for business operations. TRUiC described the acquisition as part of a strategy to support and modernize local journalism by pairing community newspapers with shared technology and business services.

== Operations ==
The paper is distributed free of charge by mail, with additional copies available at local businesses.

Following the TRUiC acquisition, the paper underwent operational changes including a redesign of its website, expanded digital offerings, and the integration of TRUiC's administrative and technical infrastructure. In 2025, editor Doug Marrin said TRUiC's CEO, Nagabhushanam “Bobby” Peddi, was running the business side of the paper.

Other local newspapers and news outlets whose coverage areas overlap with the Sun Times include:

- The Saline Post
- Chelsea Update
- Chelsea Guardian
- MLive.com
- WeLoveDexter/WeLoveAnnArbor.com
