= Nathan B. Devereaux Octagon House =

Historic house in Michigan, United States

- U.S. National Register of Historic Places
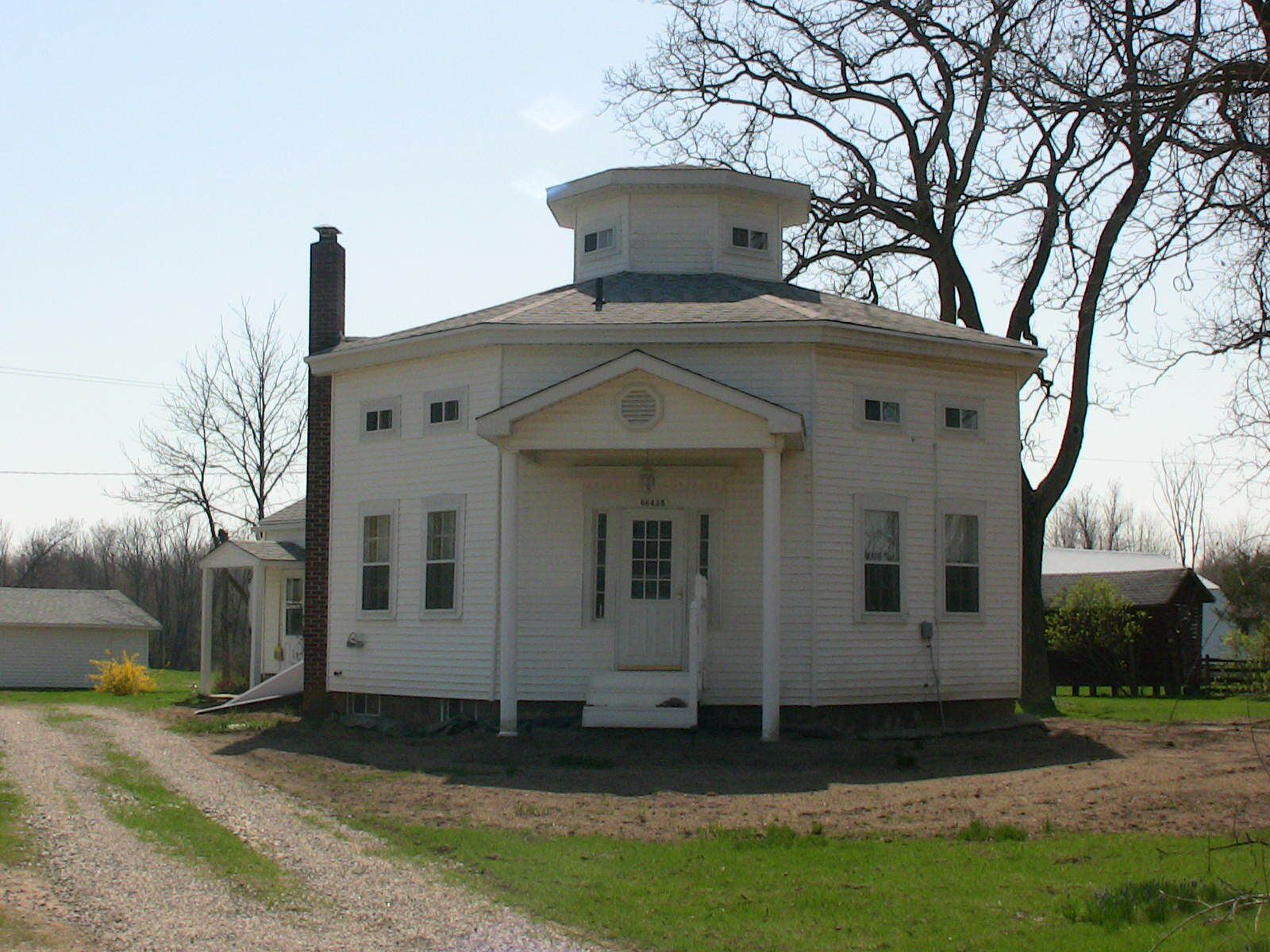

- Location within Michigan Location within the United States
- Interactive map showing the location of Nathan B. Devereaux House
- Location: 66425 Eight Mile Road, Northfield Township, Washtenaw County, Michigan
- Coordinates: 42°25′46″N 83°41′56″W
- Built: 1864
- Architect: Nathan Bartlet Devereaux
- Architectural style: Octagon Mode
- NRHP reference No.: 03000177
- Added to NRHP: April 2, 2003

The Nathan B. Devereaux Octagon House is an historic octagonal house located at 66425 Eight Mile Road in Northfield Township, Washtenaw County, Michigan. The house is one of only three extant octagonal houses in Washtenaw County, and remains in excellent and near original condition. It was placed on the National Register of Historic Places in 2003.

== History ==
This plot of land was originally owned by David F. and Caroline M. Crandal, who constructed a log cabin on the premises. In 1856, the land was purchased by Nathan and Eunice Devereaux; the couple settled into the already extant cabin. At some point in the 1850s, Nathan Bartlet Devereaux travelled to Ann Arbor to attend a lecture by Orson Squire Fowler, the leading proponent of octagonal houses. Inspired, Devereaux purchased a copy of Fowler's book, "A Home for All; or the Gravel Wall and Octagon Mode of Building. New, Cheap, Convenient, Superior and Adapted to Rich and Poor." In 1864, Devereaux put Fowler's ideas to use and built this house, doing much of the work himself. The resulting building is not a copy of Fowler's plans, but rather Devereaux's own interpretation of Fowler's ideas.

Nathan Bartlet Devereaux died in 1897 and passed the house along to his son John Wilson Devereaux. Nathan Devereaux's grandson John Francis Devereaux raised his family in the house, and lived there until his death in 1997. His wife, Laura Vivian Devereaux, continued to live in and care for the home until she died in 2010. As of 2022, the house and property were still owned by descendants of Nathan Bartlet Devereaux.

== Description ==
The Devereaux house is a 1 1/2-story, octagonal frame structure with a hipped roof surmounted with an octagonal cupola. The house sits on a fieldstone foundation, and is symmetrically shaped with eight equal sides. A small utility room is attached to the rear of the structure. The house is clad with white asbestos siding and asphalt shingles on the roof, and there is little ornamentation. The basement level is of post-and-beam construction, while the upper sections of the house is of balloon-frame construction.

The front door is slightly askew from the road, through a side of the octagon sited diagonally. The entry is Greek Revival in style with paired thin pilasters on either side of the door, and flanking sidelights above simple paneled aprons. A broad frieze and projecting classical cornice are above the door. The adjacent octagon sides are arranged symmetrically around the entry side, with two tall windows on the lower level and much smaller upper story windows.

Interior rooms are generally rectangular in shape, with triangular closet space. The first floor has a kitchen, bedroom, and parlor. Stairs to the second floor arise from the kitchen, and end in a central hall, through which three bedrooms can be accessed. A ladder goes up to the cupola.
