= Donna Lasinski =

American politician (born 1968)

Minority Leader of the Michigan House of Representatives
- In office January 13, 2021 – January 11, 2023
- Preceded by: Christine Greig
- Succeeded by: Matt Hall

Member of the Michigan House of Representatives from the 52nd district
- In office January 1, 2017 – January 11, 2023
- Preceded by: Gretchen Driskell
- Succeeded by: Mike Harris

Personal details
- Born: November 3, 1968 (age 57) Detroit, Michigan, U.S.
- Party: Democratic
- Education: University of Michigan (BBA); Northwestern University (MBA)

Donna Lasinski (born November 3, 1968) is an American politician who served in the Michigan House of Representatives from the 52nd district from 2017 to 2023.

Michigan House of Representatives
Preceded by Christine Greig	Minority Leader of the Michigan House of Representatives; 2021–2023	Succeeded by Matt Hall
