= Cole Cabana =

American football player (born 2004)

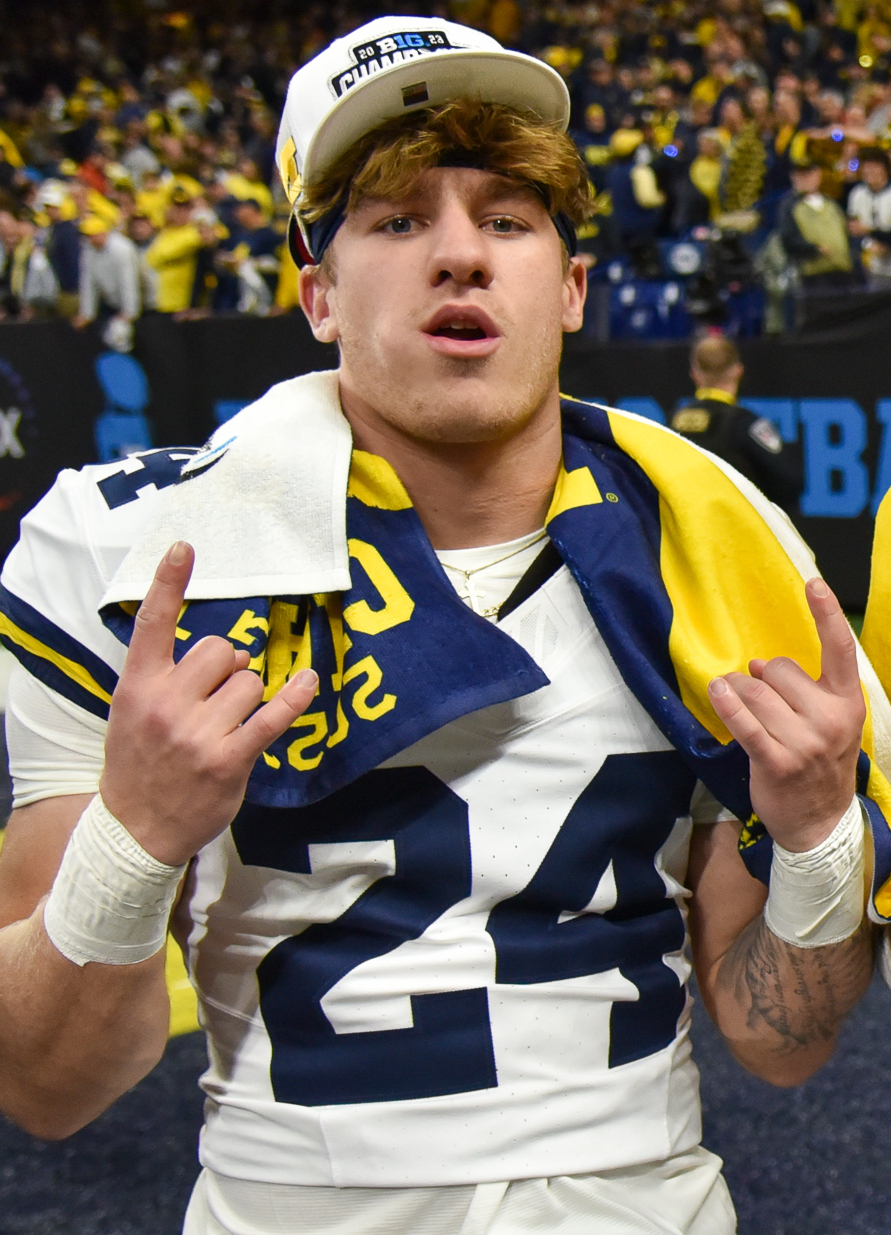
- Cabana with the Michigan Wolverines in 2023

Western Michigan Broncos
- Position: Running back
- Class: Redshirt Junior

Personal information
- Born: December 19, 2004 (age 21)
- Listed height: 5 ft 11 in (1.80 m)
- Listed weight: 205 lb (93 kg)

Career information
- High school: Dexter (Dexter, Michigan)
- College: Michigan (2023–2024); Western Michigan (2025–present)

Awards and highlights
- CFP national champion (2023)
- Stats at ESPN

Cole Cabana (born December 19, 2004) is an American college football running back for the Western Michigan Broncos. He previously played for the Michigan Wolverines, and was a member of their national championship team in 2023.

== Early life ==
Cabana was born on December 19, 2004, the son of Mike and Holly Cabana. His father Mike was a running back for the NCAA Division III national champion 1994 Albion Britons football team.

Cabana attended Dexter High School in Dexter, Michigan. As a junior in 2021, he rushed for 1,688 yards with 24 touchdowns and added 368 receiving yards with four touchdowns. As a senior in 2022, he led the team to a 12–1 record and tallied 2,434 all-purpose yards and 36 touchdowns, including 1,518 rushing yards (27 touchdowns), 472 receiving yards (six receiving touchdowns), and 444 return yards (three return touchdowns).

He was rated by ESPN and 247Sports as the No. 2 player in Michigan. He was also rated as one of the top running backs in the country, receiving the No. 5 ranking by Rivals.com and No. 6 by ESPN. Cabana also competed in track and field at Dexter, and was twice selected as an All-American sprinter.

== College career ==
=== Michigan ===
In February 2022, Cabana committed to play college football for the Michigan Wolverines football team. He enrolled early at the University of Michigan in December 2022. In 2023, as a freshman Cabana saw limited action during Michigan's national championship season, carrying the ball twice for six yards.

In 2024, Cabana did not see any playing time. On December 6, 2024, he announced via social media that he entered the NCAA transfer portal.

=== Western Michigan ===
On December 15, 2024, Cabana originally committed to transfer to the Minnesota Golden Gophers. On December 29, Cabana reversed his decision and transferred to Western Michigan University, staying in his home state to play for the Broncos. He has three years of eligibility remaining after using a redshirt year.
