= Pam Byrnes =

American politician (born 1947)

Member of the Michigan House of Representatives from the 52nd district
- In office January 1, 2005 – December 31, 2010
- Preceded by: Gene DeRossett
- Succeeded by: Mark Ouimet

Personal details
- Born: June 25, 1947 (age 79)
- Party: Democratic
- Spouse: Kent Brown
- Profession: Attorney

Pam Byrnes (born June 25, 1947) is a former Democratic State Representative in the Michigan State House of Representatives, representing the 52nd District, which covers parts of Washtenaw County. On July 18, 2013, Pam Byrnes announced that she will run as a Democratic candidate to challenge Republican Representative Tim Walberg in Michigan's 7th congressional district.

== Career ==
Byrnes is a lawyer and small business owner, and lives on a small farm outside of Chelsea, Michigan with her husband, Kent Brown. She is the former director of Washtenaw County Friend of the Court. She served as the Executive Director of the University of Michigan-Shanghai Jiao Tong University Joint Institute, a program that provides University of Michigan students and faculty a platform to engage in engineering education and research in an international setting, often collaborating with Michigan businesses, such as General Motors and TRW Automotive.

== State legislative career ==
Byrnes was elected to the State House in 2004, beating Republican Joe Yekulis by over 5000 votes. She competed with Yekulis for the section of western Washtenaw County that he had represented on the County Commission for the past decade. In 2006, Byrnes was the lone Democrat running for State Representative in the district. She faced Republican Shannon Brown in the general election, and she was reelected by over 11000 votes. Byrnes ran for re-election to the State House for the final time in November 2008, due to Michigan term limits. Byrnes' Republican opponent was Eric Lielbriedis, of Saline. She was reelected with over 62% of the vote, and a margin of over 16000 votes. While in the House, Byrnes served as House Speaker Pro Tempore.

On December 13, 2009, Pam Byrnes announced her candidacy for State Senate in Michigan's 18th district at the Ypsilanti Freighthouse in Ypsilanti's Depot Town. Five days before the election, an article in a Michigan newspaper revealed that the Great Lakes Education Project (GLEP), a Political Action Committee funded in part by Republicans Dick & Betsy DeVos, made two independent expenditures promoting Pam Byrnes and one independent expenditure criticizing her opponent. GLEP lobbies for choice, accountability and quality in education and assists candidates that support education reform. Byrnes lost the Democratic primary to Rebekah Warren, 55-41%. Warren would go on to win the general election.

== 2014 Congressional election ==
On July 18, 2013, Pam Byrnes announced her candidacy for Congress in Michigan's 7th congressional district. In announcing her candidacy, Byrnes stated, "Washington is broken and Rep. Tim Walberg is part of the problem. Michigan's middle-class is paying the price for his partisan politics that put special interests and corporation before working families." Byrnes was endorsed by EMILY's List. She would go to lose by 53% to 41%.

== Electoral history ==
Michigan's 52nd district House District, 2004
Party	Candidate	Votes	%
Democratic	Pam Byrnes	29,740	54.49
Republican	Joe Yekulis	24,669	45.20
Write-in	Various	166	0.30
Majority		5,071	9.29
Turnout		54,575	
Democratic gain from Republican			

Michigan's 52nd district House District, 2006
Party	Candidate	Votes	%
Democratic	Pam Byrnes (Incumbent)	28,046	62.61
Republican	Shannon Brown	16,747	37.39
Majority		11,299	25.22
Turnout		57,185	
Democratic hold			

Michigan's 52nd district House District, 2008
Party	Candidate	Votes	%
Democratic	Pam Byrnes (Incumbent)	35,957	62.88
Republican	Eric Lielbriedis	19,180	33.54
Libertarian	John Boyle	1,981	3.46
Write-in	Various	67	0.12
Majority		16,777	29.29
Turnout		57,284	
Democratic hold			

Michigan's 18th Senate District, 2010 Democratic primary results
Party	Candidate	Votes	%
Democratic	Rebekah Warren	13,113	55.66
Democratic	Pam Byrnes	9,539	40.49
Democratic	Thomas Partridge	909	3.86

Michigan's 7th Congressional District, 2014 Democratic primary results
Party	Candidate	Votes	%
Democratic	Pam Byrnes	25,048	100

Michigan's 7th Congressional District, 2014
Party	Candidate	Votes	%
Republican	Tim Walberg (Incumbent)	119,564	53.45
Democratic	Pam Byrnes	92,083	41.17
Libertarian	Ken Proctor	4,531	2.03
No Party Affiliation	David Swartout	4,369	1.95
U.S. Taxpayers Party of Michigan	Rick Strawcutter	3,138	1.40
Majority		12.28	
Turnout		223,685	
Republican hold			
