= Dexter High School (Michigan) =

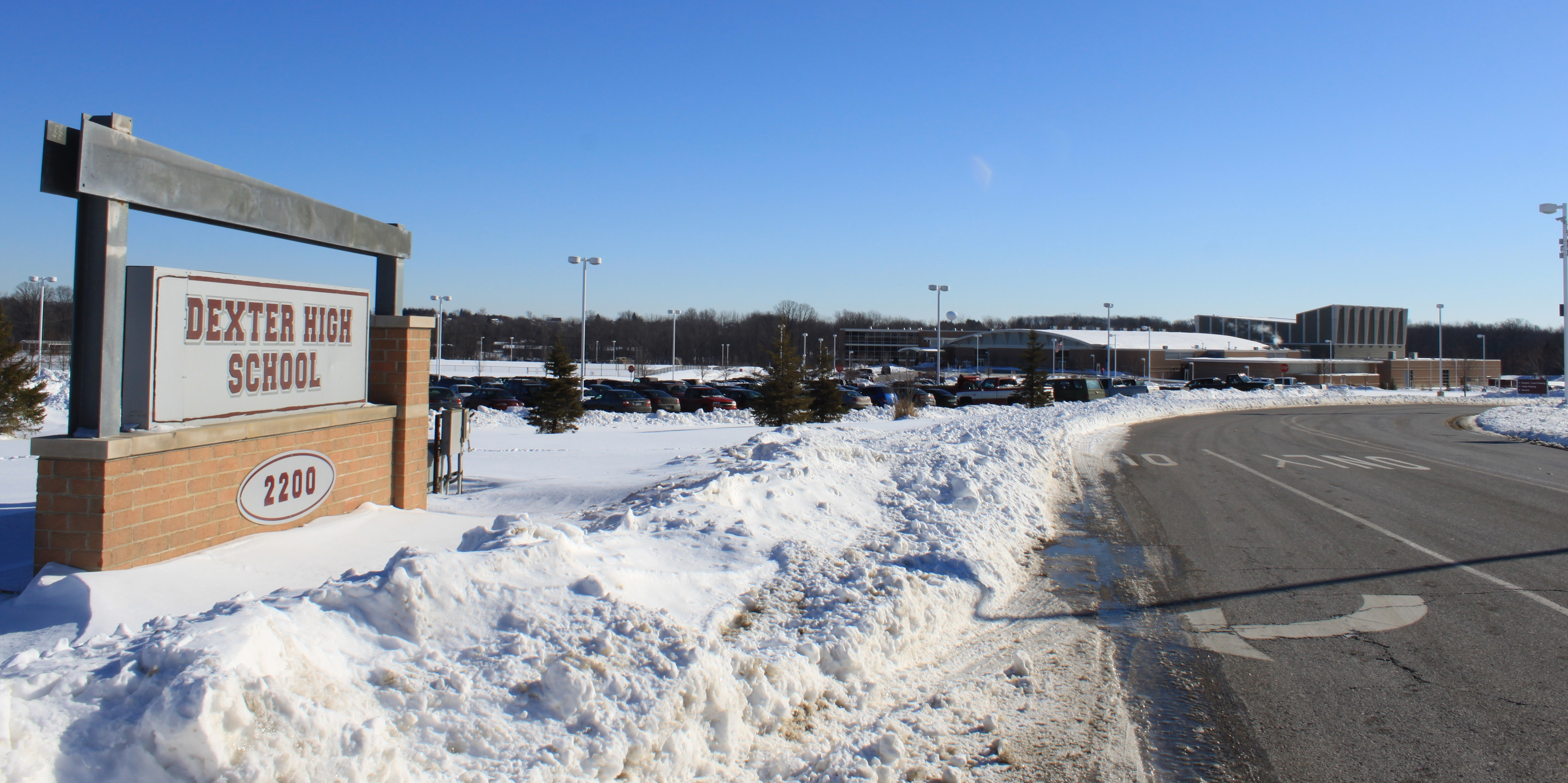

Location
- 2200 North Parker Road; Dexter postal address, Michigan; United States; 42°19′17″N 83°53′43″W

Information
- Type: Public
- Established: February 2002
- School district: Dexter Community Schools
- Superintendent: Ryan Bruder
- Principal: Theresa Stager
- Teaching staff: 77.20 (FTE)
- Grades: 9-12
- Enrollment: 1,053 (2024–2025)
- Student to teacher ratio: 13.64
- Colors: Maroon and gold
- Athletics: Southeastern Conference
- Nickname: Dreadnaughts
- Yearbook: Unsinkable
- Website: dhs.dexterschools.org

Dexter High School (DHS) is a public high school located in Scio Township, Michigan, with a Dexter postal address, serving grades 9-12. Theresa Stager is the school's current principal. Dexter High School is one of only two schools in the United States with a dreadnaught as a mascot, the other being Lakeland Senior High School in Florida.

== History ==
Dexter High School was originally located in the building which is now Creekside Intermediate School. When the population of students became too large for this building, the new Dexter High School was built in 2002 in its current location. In the fall of 2009, Dexter High School was used as a location for the 2010 film Trust.

== Academics ==
Student assessments
- 2021–22 school year Change vs. prior year

M-STEP 11th grade proficiency rates (Science / Social Studies)
- Advanced %: 48.2 / 22.7
- Proficient %: 29.0 / 45.5
- PR. Proficient %: 11.4 / 0.0
- Not Proficient %: 11.4 / ≤5

Average test scores
- SAT Total: 1110.3 (▼ −21.6)

Dexter High School offers 14 different AP courses and 24 IB courses. Dexter High School also houses more than 30 clubs for students to participate in. DHS also has musical departments including band, orchestra, and most recently, choir.

The Dexter High School National Ocean Science Bowl team took 2nd place nationally in 2015.

Dexter High School had a 4-year high school graduation rate of 99% as of 2020.

== Extracurricular activities ==
=== Athletics ===
The Dexter Dreadnaughts compete in the SEC. The school colors are maroon, white, and gold. Dexter offers the following MHSAA sanctioned varsity sports:

- Baseball (boys)
- Basketball (girls and boys)
- Competitive cheer (girls)
- Cross country (girls and boys)
- Field Hockey (girls)
- Football (boys)
- Golf (girls and boys)
- Ice hockey (boys)
- Lacrosse (girls and boys)
- Soccer (girls and boys)
- Softball (girls)
- Swim and dive (girls and boys)
- Tennis (girls and boys)
- Track and field (girls and boys)
- Volleyball (girls)
- Wrestling (boys)

=== Clubs ===
- Dexter Drama Club
- Dexter Model United Nations Club

== Notable alumni ==
- Jennie Ritter (2002), former softball pitcher
- Eva Gaetino (2020), soccer defender for Denver Summit FC
- Abigail Tamer (2021), field hockey player who represented the United States at the 2024 Summer Olympics
- Cole Cabana (2023), running back for the Western Michigan Broncos
