= Webster Township, Michigan =

- Civil township
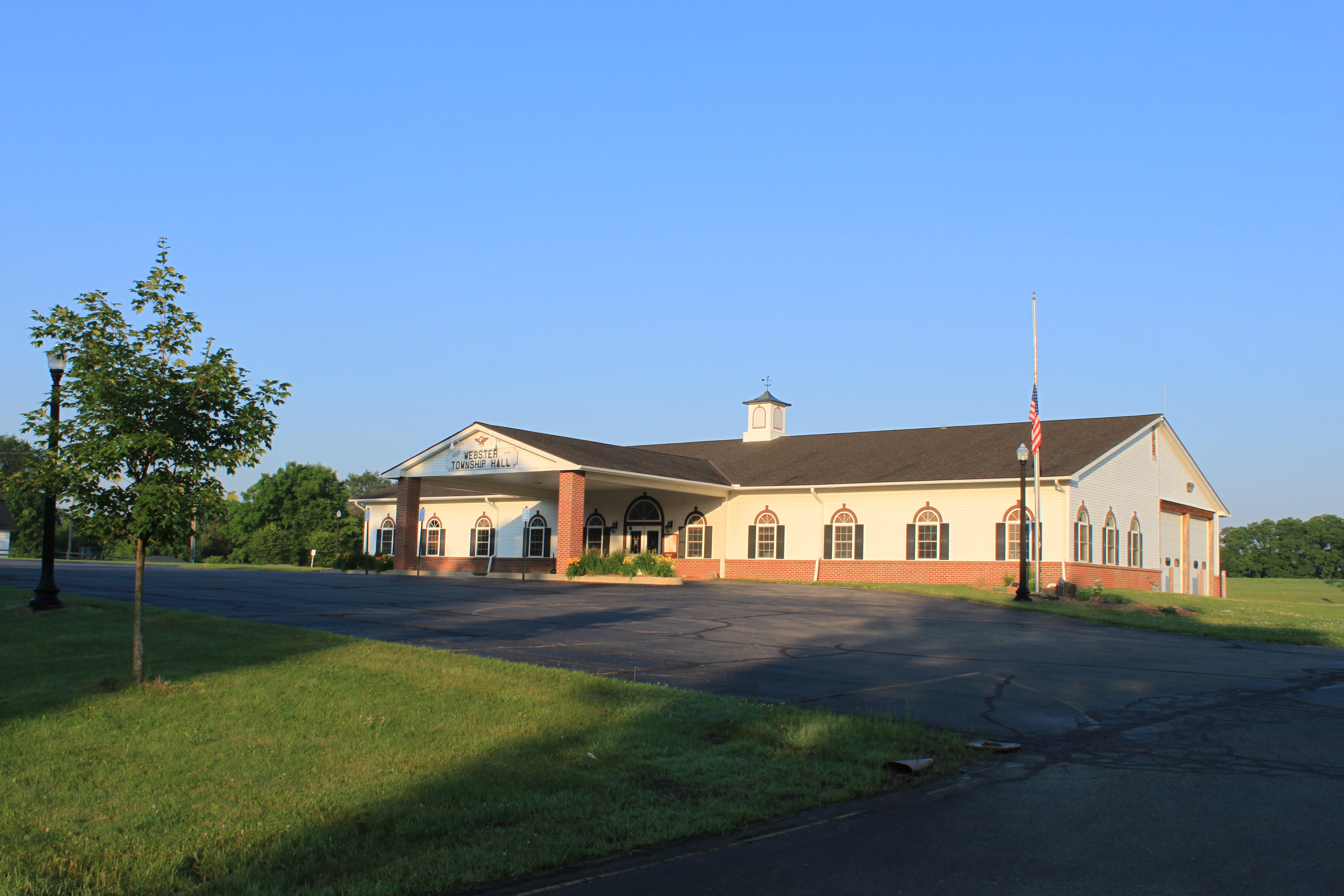
- Township Hall on Webster Church Road

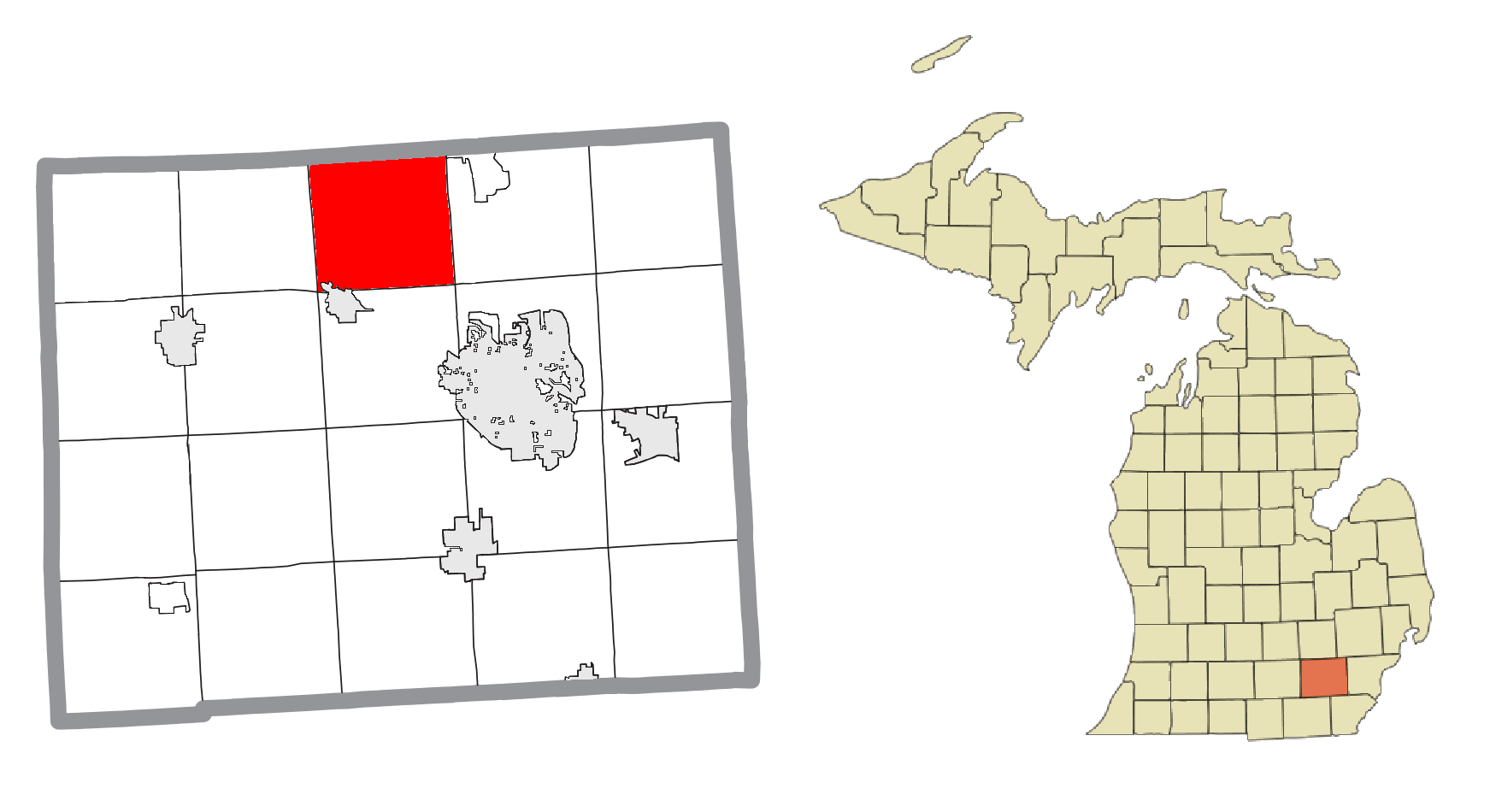
- Location within Washtenaw County

- Location within the state of Michigan Location within the United States
- Coordinates: 42°22′40″N 83°50′18″W
- Country: United States
- State: Michigan
- County: Washtenaw
- Established: 1833

Government
  - Supervisor: John Kingsley
  - Clerk: Barb Calleja

Area
  - Total: 35.89 sq mi (92.95 km^{2})
  - Land: 34.09 sq mi (88.29 km^{2})
  - Water: 0.80 sq mi (2.07 km^{2})
- Elevation: 922 ft (281 m)

Population (2020)
  - Total: 6,575
  - Density: 192.9/sq mi (74.47/km^{2})
- Time zone: UTC-5 (Eastern (EST))
  - Summer (DST): UTC-4 (EDT)
- ZIP code(s): 48105 (Ann Arbor); 48130 (Dexter); 48189 (Whitmore Lake)
- Area code: 734
- FIPS code: 26-85100
- GNIS feature ID: 1627237
- Website: Official website

Old Webster Township Hall
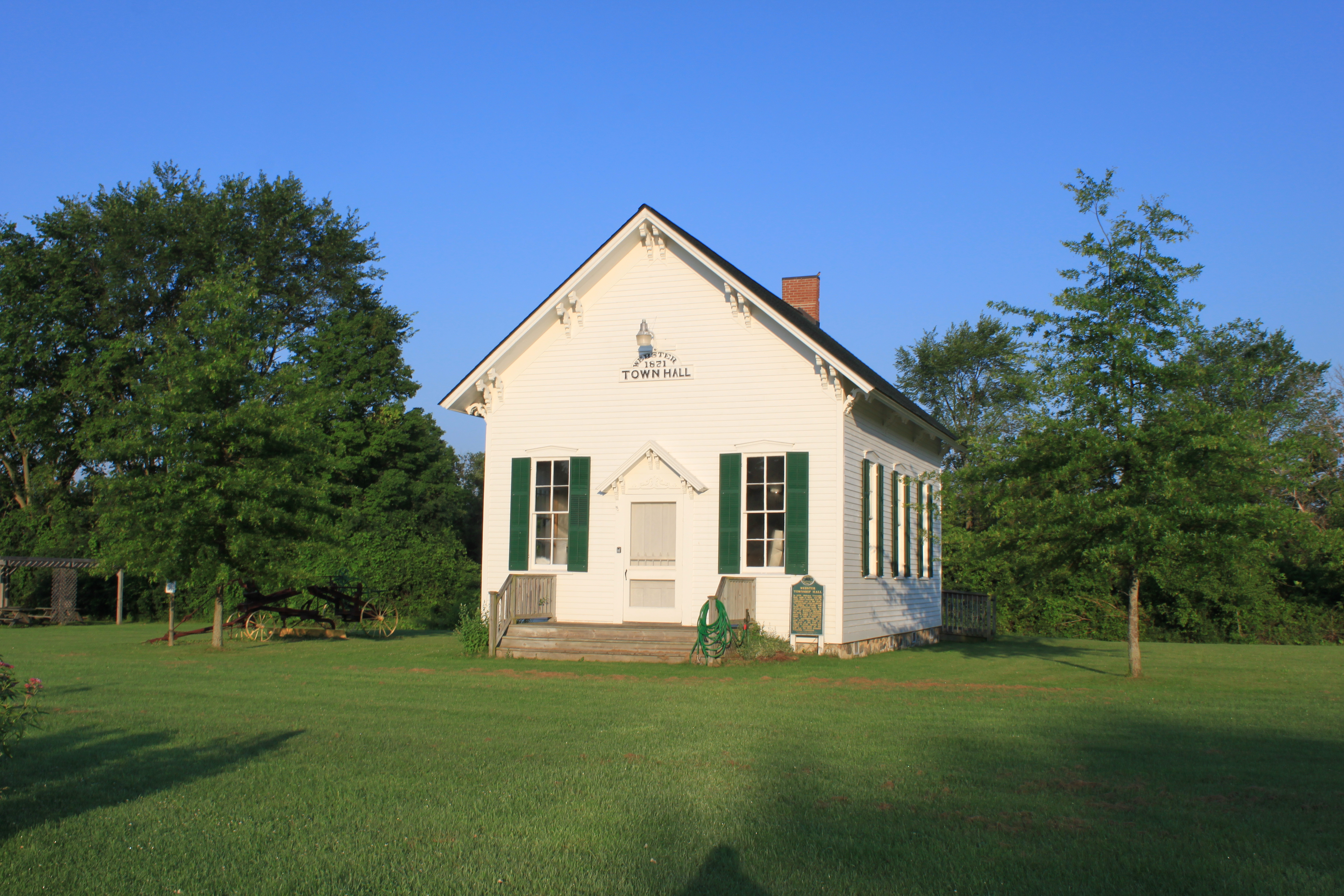
- Interactive map of Old Webster Township Hall
- 42°22′11″N 83°49′59″W
- Location: 5001 Gregory Road; Dexter, Michigan

History
- Built: 1871

Michigan State Historic Site
- Designated: November 16, 1982

Webster Township is a civil township of Washtenaw County in the U.S. state of Michigan. The population was 6,575 at the 2020 census.

== Communities ==
- Webster is an unincorporated community located within the township at 42°23′43″N 83°48′17″W. The area was first settled by Thomas Alexander in May 1826, and others arrived later that year. When the township was organized in 1833, the name was chosen after Daniel Webster, and the community also took the same name. A post office named Webster opened on May 11, 1833. It was renamed to Walsh and moved to neighboring Northfield Township from July 18, 1881, until it closed on January 13, 1885. Another post office named Webster was reestablished and operated from April 14, 1882, until it closed on August 30, 1900.

== Geography ==
According to the U.S. Census Bureau at, the township has a total area of 35.681 square miles (92.41 km^{2}), of which 34.871 square miles (90.32 km^{2}) is land and 0.810 square miles (2.10 km^{2}) (2.27%) is water. A small portion of Webster Township's area and population decreased slightly after the 2010 census when the village of Dexter incorporated as an autonomous city in 2014.

Webster Township contains a small portion of the Hudson Mills Metropark in the southwest corner of the township, which also includes a short route of the Border-to-Border Trail along the Huron River.

== Demographics ==
As of the census of 2020, there were 6,588 people and 2,426 households residing in the township. The population density was 147.4 inhabitants per square mile (56.9/km^{2}). There were 1,859 housing units at an average density of 52.7 per square mile (20.3/km^{2}). The racial makeup of the township was 97.19% White, 0.62% African American, 0.31% Native American, 0.87% Asian, 0.25% from other races, and 0.77% from two or more races. Hispanic or Latino of any race were 1.15% of the population.

There were 2,426 households, out of which 44.3% had children under the age of 18 living with them, 77.6% were married couples living together, 4.1% had a female householder with no husband present, and 15.9% were non-families. 11.7% of all households were made up of individuals, and 3.4% had someone living alone who was 65 years of age or older. The average household size was 2.93 and the average family size was 3.20.

In the township the population was spread out, with 30.5% under the age of 18, 4.0% from 18 to 24, 29.4% from 25 to 44, 29.0% from 45 to 64, and 7.1% who were 65 years of age or older. The median age was 39 years. For every 100 females, there were 104.8 males. For every 100 females age 18 and over, there were 102.2 males.

The median income for a household in the township was $90,830, and the median income for a family was $97,828. Males had a median income of $62,384 versus $40,859 for females. The per capita income for the township was $35,883. None of the families and 0.8% of the population were living below the poverty line, including no under eighteen and none of those over 64.

96.5% have a high school graduate or higher, while 70% have a bachelor's degree or higher.

== Education ==
Webster Township is served by four separate public school districts. The vast majority of the township is served by Dexter Community School District to the southwest in Dexter. The southeast corner of the township is served by Ann Arbor Public Schools. Very small portions of the eastern border of the township are served by Whitmore Lake Public Schools in Whitmore Lake. The northwest corner of the township near Base Line Lake is served by Pinckney Community Schools in Livingston County.

== Gallery ==
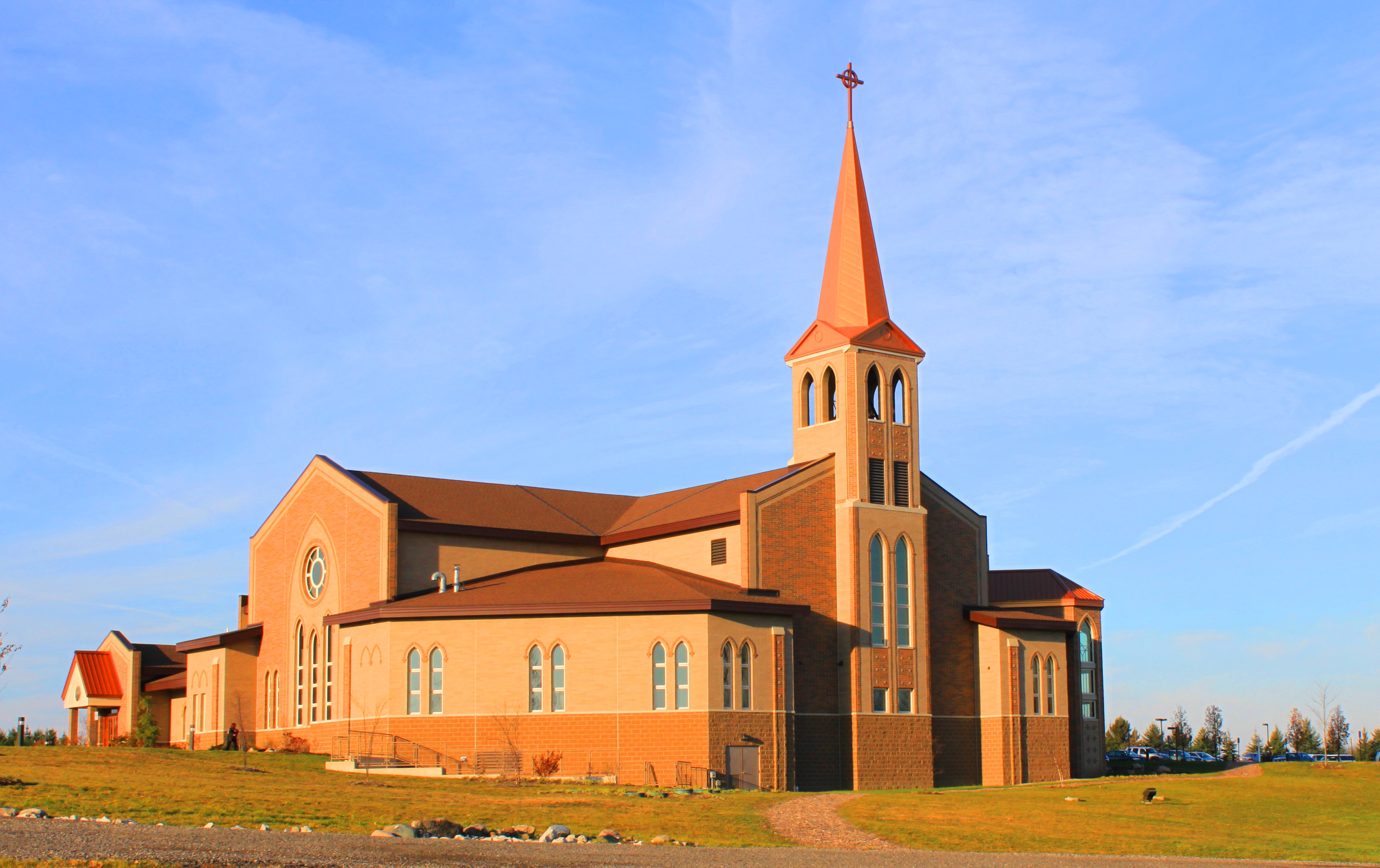
St. Joseph Catholic Church

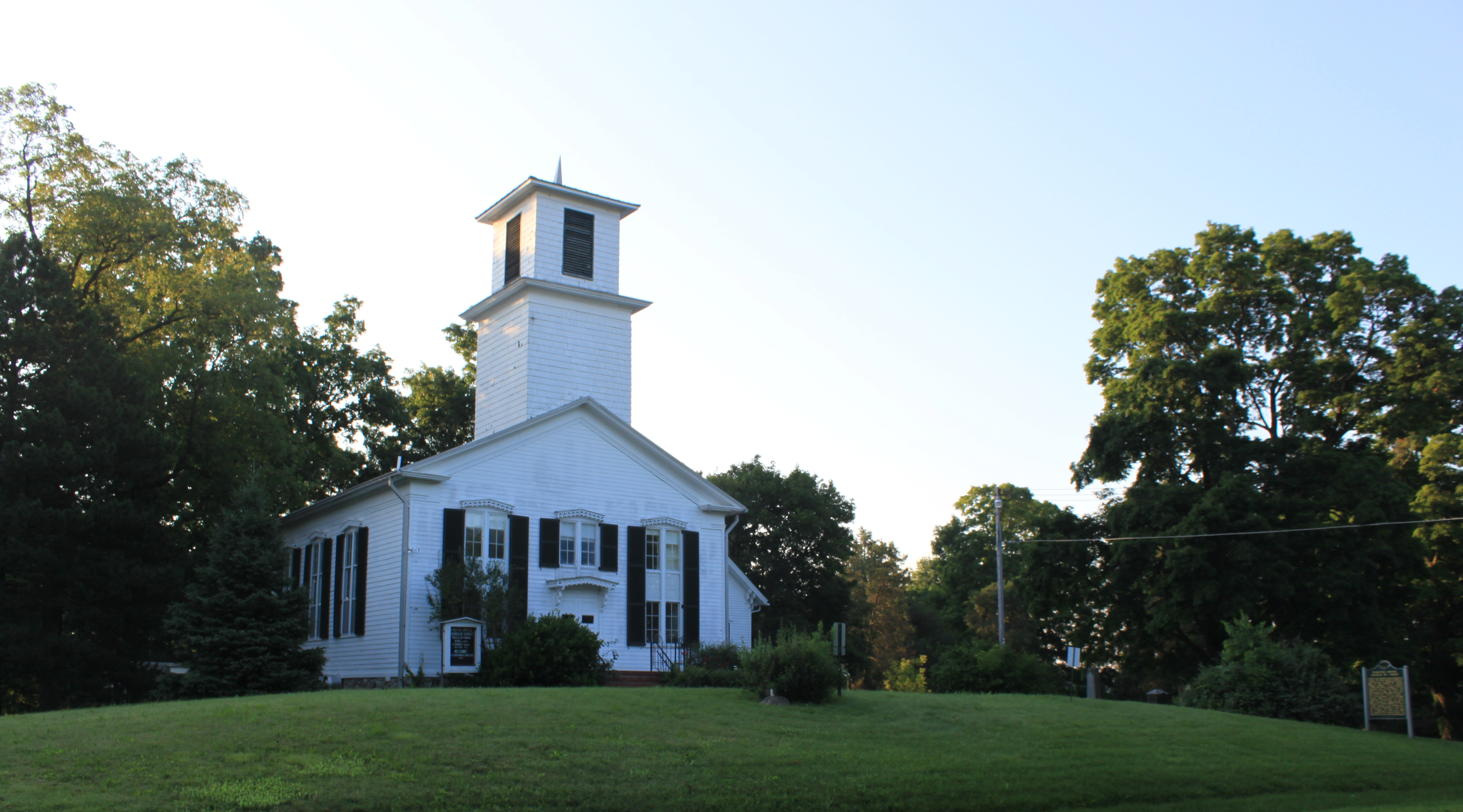
Webster United Church of Christ

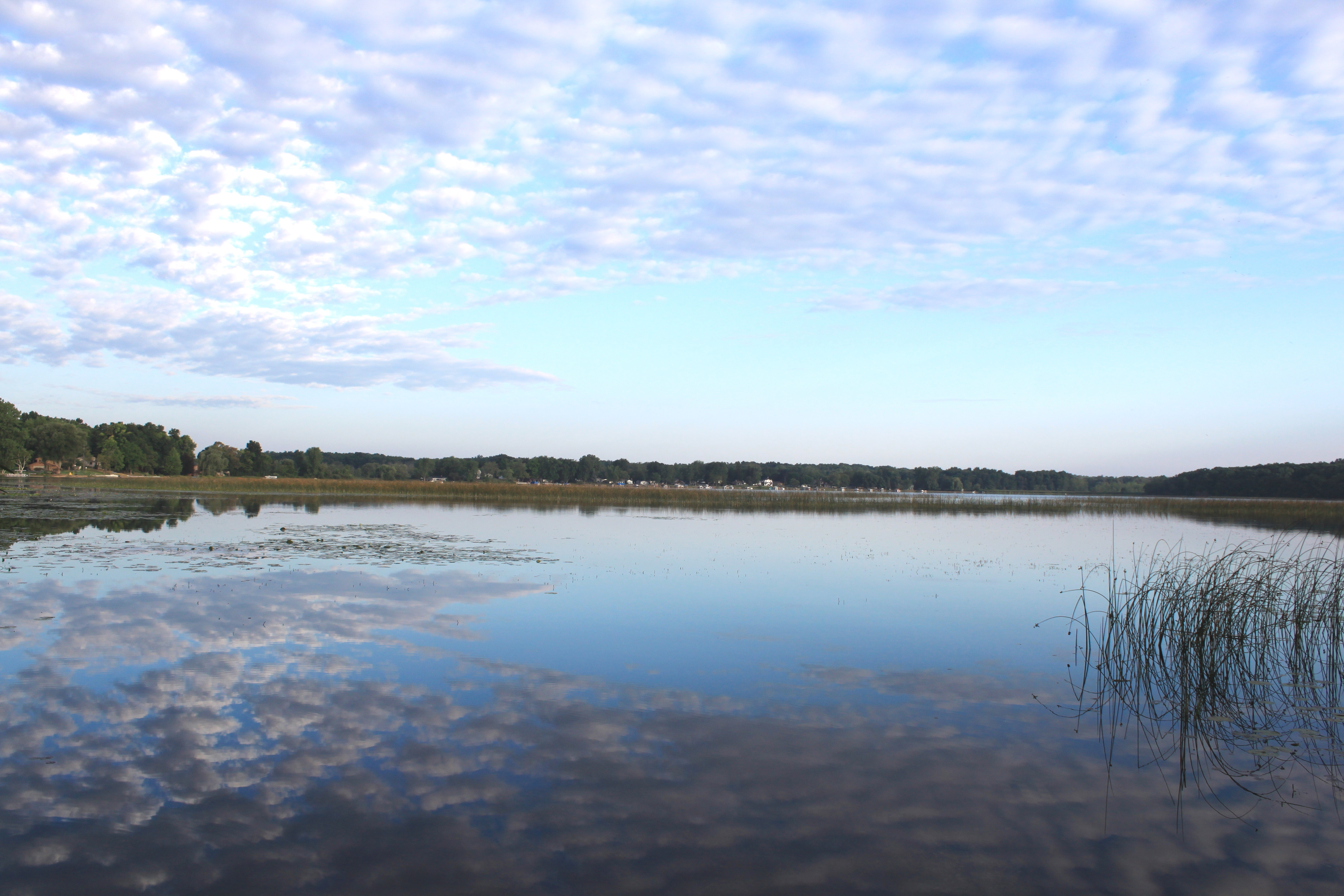
Independence Lake
