= Mark Ouimet (politician) =

American politician

Member of the Michigan House of Representatives from the 52nd district
- In office January 1, 2011 – December 31, 2012
- Preceded by: Pam Byrnes
- Succeeded by: Gretchen Driskell

Personal details
- Born: April 22, 1949 (age 77) Ann Arbor, Michigan, U.S.
- Party: Republican
- Spouse: Donna
- Children: 2
- Education: Northwood Institute

Mark Ouimet (born April 22, 1949) is a Republican politician and served in the Michigan House of Representatives from the 52nd district covering Washtenaw County, Michigan for one term.

== Personal life and education ==
Ouimet was born in Ann Arbor on April 22, 1949, and raised in Washtenaw County, Michigan. He received a degree from the unaccredited Northwood Institute (since renamed Northwood University and became accredited), and received a bachelor's and master's degree from the unaccredited LaSalle University in Louisiana, a diploma mill closed by the FBI in July 1996. He later served as Chancellor and COO of Northwood University from 1991 to 2002.

He is married to Donna, and together they have two children named Mark and Courtney.

== Political career ==
Ouimet served as a member of the Ann Arbor city council from 1988 to 1992, and served on the Washtenaw County Board of Commissioners.

In 1992, Ouimet unsuccessfully ran for the Michigan House of Representatives.

In 2010, he won election in the 52nd district against Christine Green; Ouimet had 21,462 votes (51.6 percent) to Green's 20,027 (48.1 percent). During his term, Ouimet was a member of the Accommodations Ordinance Commission, Emergency Medical Services Commission, Money Purchase Pension Plan, Retirement Commission, Workforce Development Board, and the Washtenaw Economic Development Council.

In 2011, he endorsed Mitt Romney for the 2012 United States presidential election.

In 2012, he faced Saline Mayor Gretchen Driskell, a Democrat, for reelection and lost. Driskell received 26,646 votes (52.9%), while Ouimet received 23,609 votes (46.8%).
