= Dexter Community Schools =

School district in Michigan

Dexter Public Schools
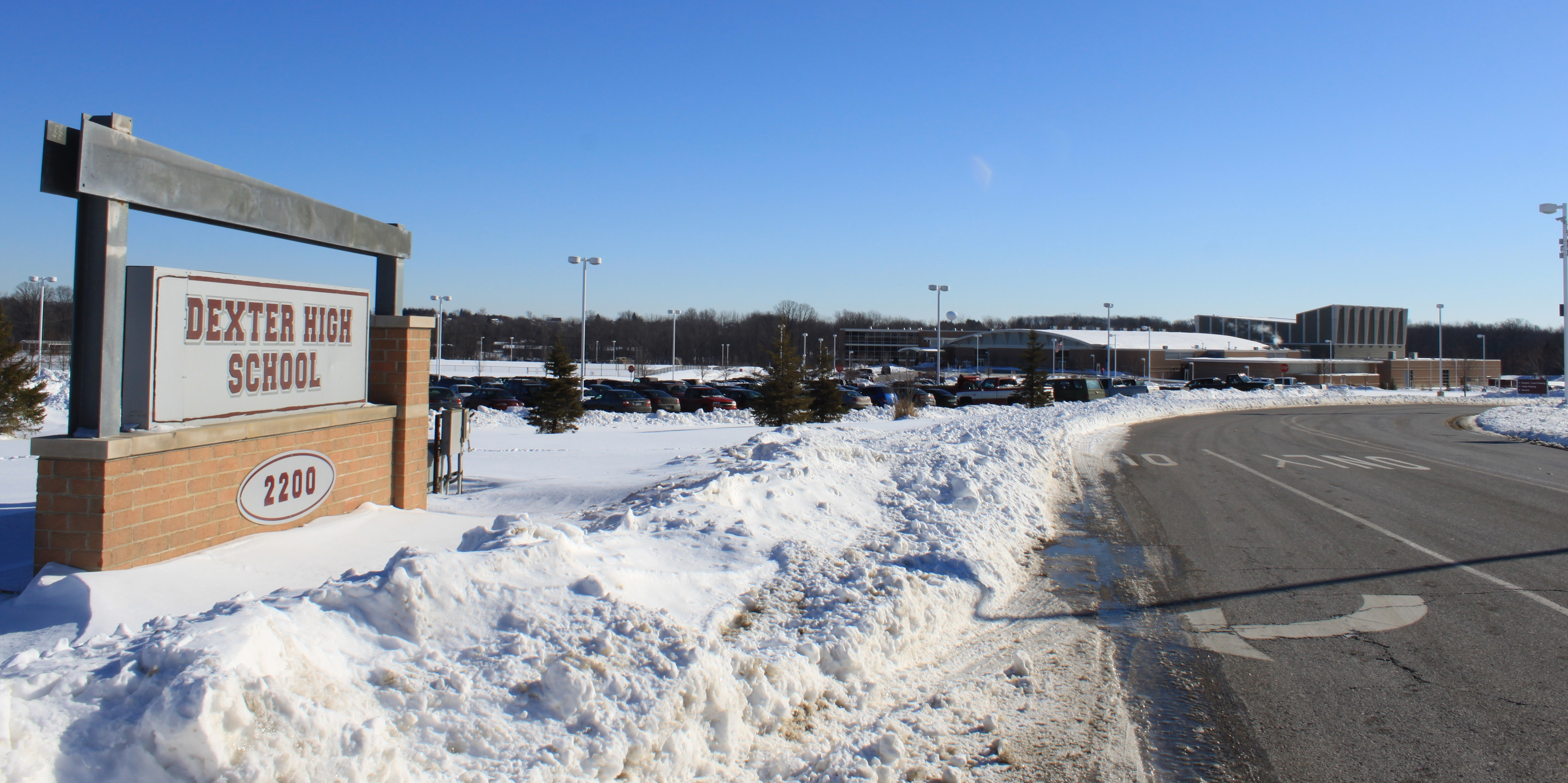
- Dexter High School

Address
- 2704 Baker Road Dexter, Washtenaw, Michigan, 48130; United States

District information
- Grades: Pre-Kindergarten-12
- Superintendent: Ryan Bruder
- Schools: 7
- Budget: $66,625,000 2022-2023 expenditures
- NCES District ID: 2612030

Students and staff
- Students: 3,311 (2024-2025)
- Teachers: 235.12 (on an FTE basis) (2024-2025)
- Staff: 527.28 FTE (2024-2025)
- Student–teacher ratio: 14.08 (2024-2025)

Other information
- Website: www.dexterschools.org

Dexter Community Schools is a public school district in Washtenaw County. It includes all of the municipality of Dexter, as well as sections of the following townships: Dexter, Webster, Lima, Scio, Northfield, Freedom, and Lodi. The district extends into Hamburg Township, Livingston County.

The district's buildings are connected by sidewalks on a campus on the south side of Dexter.

== History ==
The first school in Dexter was built in 1830. A union school was constructed in 1857. It was replaced in 1887. An addition to it, called the Copeland Building, was built in 1937. When the 1887 building was demolished, in 1956, the Copeland Building remained, and was used by the district until its sale in 2020.

The Ann Arbor News wrote that there had been "years of effort" to create an amalgamated school district. In 1949 a merger proposal for 21 school districts was formally proposed. The school district Dexter Agricultural Schools was created via consolidation in 1950. The eleven primary school districts that consolidated with Dexter's district were:

- Eastern and Parker in Lima Township
- Arnold, Hudson, Smith and Gallagher in Dexter Township
- Dexter and Hawkins in Scio Township
- Podunk, Peatt, Church and Merrill in Webster Township.

The oldest district building still operating is Bates School, built as Dexter Elementary in 1953. It houses district administration, community education and half-day preschool. The district acquired its present name in 1956.

A high school, now Creekside Intermediate School, opened in 1958. The current high school opened in February, 2002. Its architect was Kingscott Associates.

A bond issue passed in 2025 will renovate Creekside Intermediate School and move grades seven and eight there. Grades five and six will be moved to Mill Creek Middle School. Additions will also be built at the high school.

== Schools ==
Schools in Dexter Community Schools district
School	Address	Notes
Dexter High School	2200 N. Parker Rd., Dexter	Grades 9–12. Built 2002.
Dexter International Academy	2704 Baker Road, Dexter	Grades PreK-12
Mill Creek Middle School	7305 Ann Arbor Street, Dexter	Grades 7–8. Built 1995.
Creekside Intermediate	2615 Baker Rd., Dexter	Grades 5–6. Built 1958.
Wylie Elementary	3060 Kensington St., Dexter	Grades 3–4. Built 1964.
Dexter Early Elementary Complex	7480 Dan Hoey Road, Dexter	Grades PreK-2. Built in 1995 as Cornerstone Elementary, addition built in 2019.
Jenkins Early Childhood Learning Center	2801 Baker Rd., Dexter	Preschool. Built 1993. Includes "Baby House," built in 1925.
