= Roy Smith (Michigan politician) =

American politician

Roy Eugene Smith (June 7, 1941 – November 27, 2011) was an American politician. A member of the Republican Party, he served in the Michigan House of Representatives from 1967 to 1972 and again from 1975 to 1982.

Smith died on November 27, 2011, in Indiana, at the age of 70.
