= Northfield Township, Michigan =

- Civil township
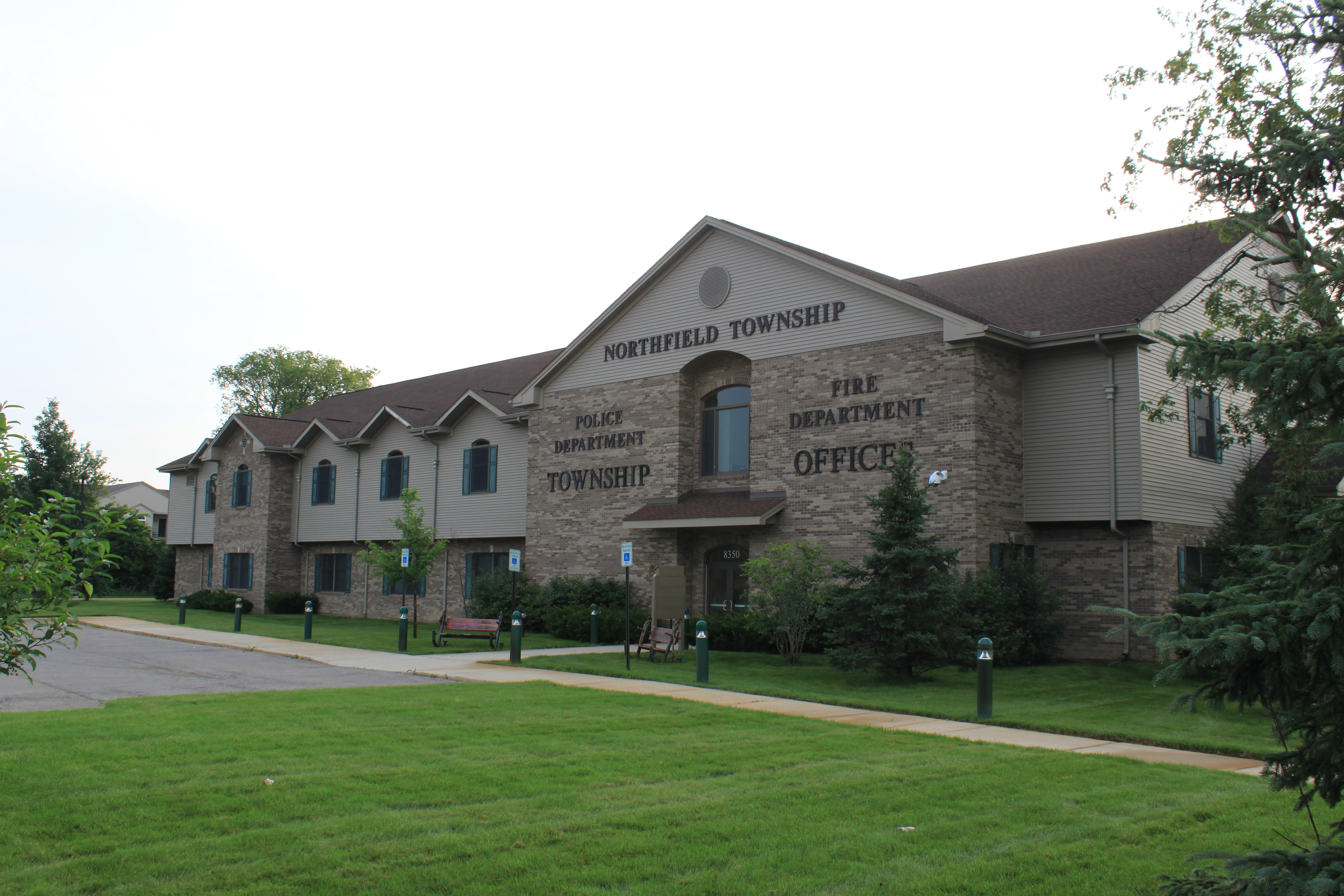
- Township Hall on Main Street
- Motto: Planning for our future, preserving our past
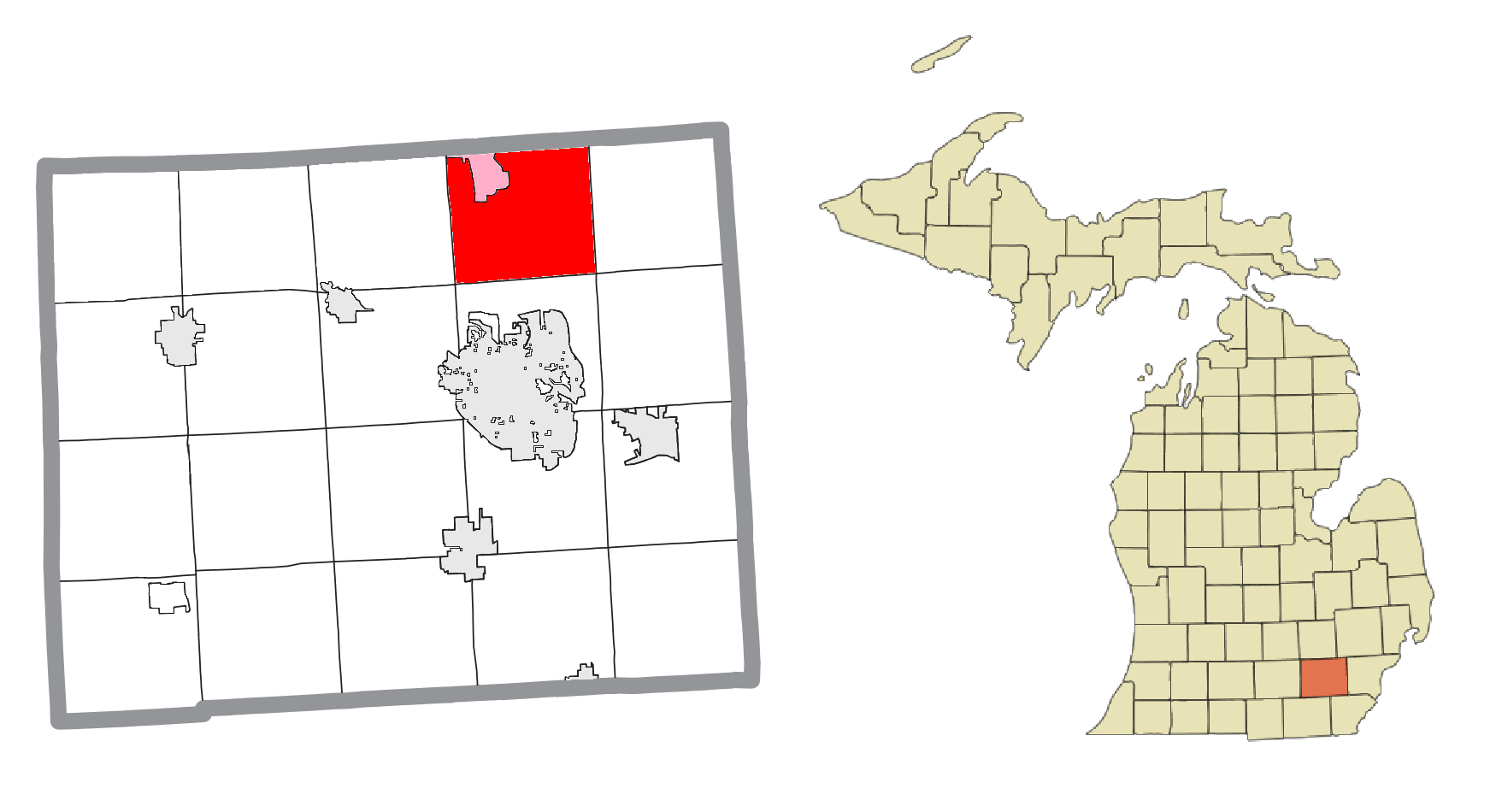
- Location within Washtenaw County (red) and an administered portion of the Whitmore Lake community (pink)

- Location within the state of Michigan Location within the United States
- Coordinates: 42°24′02″N 83°44′36″W
- Country: United States
- State: Michigan
- County: Washtenaw
- Established: 1832

Government
  - Type: General Law Township
  - Supervisor: Kenneth J. Dignan III
  - Clerk: Kathleen Manley
  - Treasurer: Jacki Otto

Area
  - Total: 36.37 sq mi (94.20 km^{2})
  - Land: 35.77 sq mi (92.64 km^{2})
  - Water: 0.60 sq mi (1.55 km^{2})
- Elevation: 912 ft (278 m)

Population (2020)
  - Total: 8,514
  - Density: 236.5/sq mi (91.3/km^{2})
- Time zone: UTC-5 (Eastern (EST))
  - Summer (DST): UTC-4 (EDT)
- ZIP code(s): 48105 (Ann Arbor); 48178 (South Lyon); 48189 (Whitmore Lake)
- Area code: 734
- FIPS code: 26-58280
- GNIS feature ID: 1626812
- Website: Official website

Northfield Township is a civil township of Washtenaw County in the U.S. state of Michigan. The population was 8,514 at the 2020 census.

== Communities ==
- Emery is an unincorporated community located within the township at 42°21′36″N 83°40′59″W. Emery was settled as early as 1831 by Joshua Leland from Madison County, New York. He named the settlement after his son Emery Leland, who much later served as Northfield Township Supervisor and county judge. Emery was renamed Leland in 1884 when the Toledo, Ann Arbor & Northern Michigan Railroad built a station named Leland in the community. Despite the name change, a post office opened in the community under the name Emery on February 20, 1884, and operated until March 31, 1903.
- Gravel Run is a former settlement that was founded by Roswell Curtis in 1842, and he became the first postmaster when the Gravel Run post office opened on May 18, 1850. He served in this capacity until he died in 1870. The community was named after the stream where the community was located. The post office was transferred to and renamed Northfield on October 2, 1860. The Gravel Run post office was soon reestablished on October 22, 1860. The post office closed on November 19, 1875, but was restored briefly from November 12, 1877, until it ultimately closed on July 19, 1878.
- Northfield is an unincorporated community located within the township at 42°20′38″N 83°43′35″W. A post office was first established here on June 9, 1834, and was named after the township. The post office was transferred to and renamed Whitmore Lake on December 17, 1854. The Northfield post office was reestablished on February 16, 1855, and operated until January 3, 1856.
- Walsh is the name of a former settlement within the township. The Walsh post office was established on July 18, 1881, after it was transferred from Webster in neighboring Webster Township. Webster reestablished its own post office on April 14, 1882. The Walsh post office operated until January 13, 1885.
- Whitmore Lake is an unincorporated community and census-designated place located within the township at 42°26′23″N 83°44′38″W. The CDP also extends north into Green Oak Township in Livingston County.

== Geography ==
According to the U.S. Census Bureau, the township has a total area of 36.37 square miles (94.20 km^{2}), of which 35.77 square miles (92.64 km^{2}) is land and 0.60 square miles (1.55 km^{2}) (1.65%) is water.

=== Major highways ===
- US 23 runs south–north through the western portion of the township.

== Demographics ==
As of the census of 2020, there were 8,514 people, 3,521 households, and 2,236 families residing in the township. The population density was 236.5 inhabitants per square mile (91.3/km^{2}). There were 3,393 housing units at an average density of 93.5 per square mile (36.1/km^{2}). The racial makeup of the township was 97.3% White, 0.6% African American, 0.0% Native American, 0.7% Asian, 0.0% Pacific Islander, 0.23% from other races, and 1.2% from two or more races. Hispanic or Latino of any race were 3.6% of the population.

There were 3,521 households, out of which 20.9% had children under the age of 18 living with them, 58.1% were married couples living together, 8.8% had a female householder with no husband present, and 29.1% were non-families. 21.5% of all households were made up of individuals, and 13.7% had someone living alone who was 65 years of age or older. The average household size was 2.41 and the average family size was 3.02.

In the township, 26.9% of the population was under the age of 18, 7.1% were from 18 to 24, 36.8% from 25 to 44, 22.2% from 45 to 64, and 13.7% were 65 years of age or older. The median age was 35 years. For every 100 females, there were 102.8 males. For every 100 females age 18 and over, there were 98.2 males.

The median income for a household in the township was $79,890, and the median income for a family was $68,393. Males had a median income of $41,883 versus $30,680 for females. The per capita income for the township was $40,621. About 2.4% of families and 4.1% of the population were below the poverty line, including 3.9% of those under age 18 and 0.9% of those age 65 or over.

== Education ==
Northfield Township is served by four separate public school districts. Ann Arbor Public Schools serves small portions of the southern area of the township. Whitmore Lake Public Schools serves most of the southeast to northwest areas of the township, and South Lyon Community Schools in South Lyon serves the northeast portion. Very small portions of the northwestern edge of the township are served by Dexter Community School District to the southwest in Dexter.

== Notable people ==
- Martha Waldron Janes (1832–1913), minister, suffragist, columnist

== Images ==
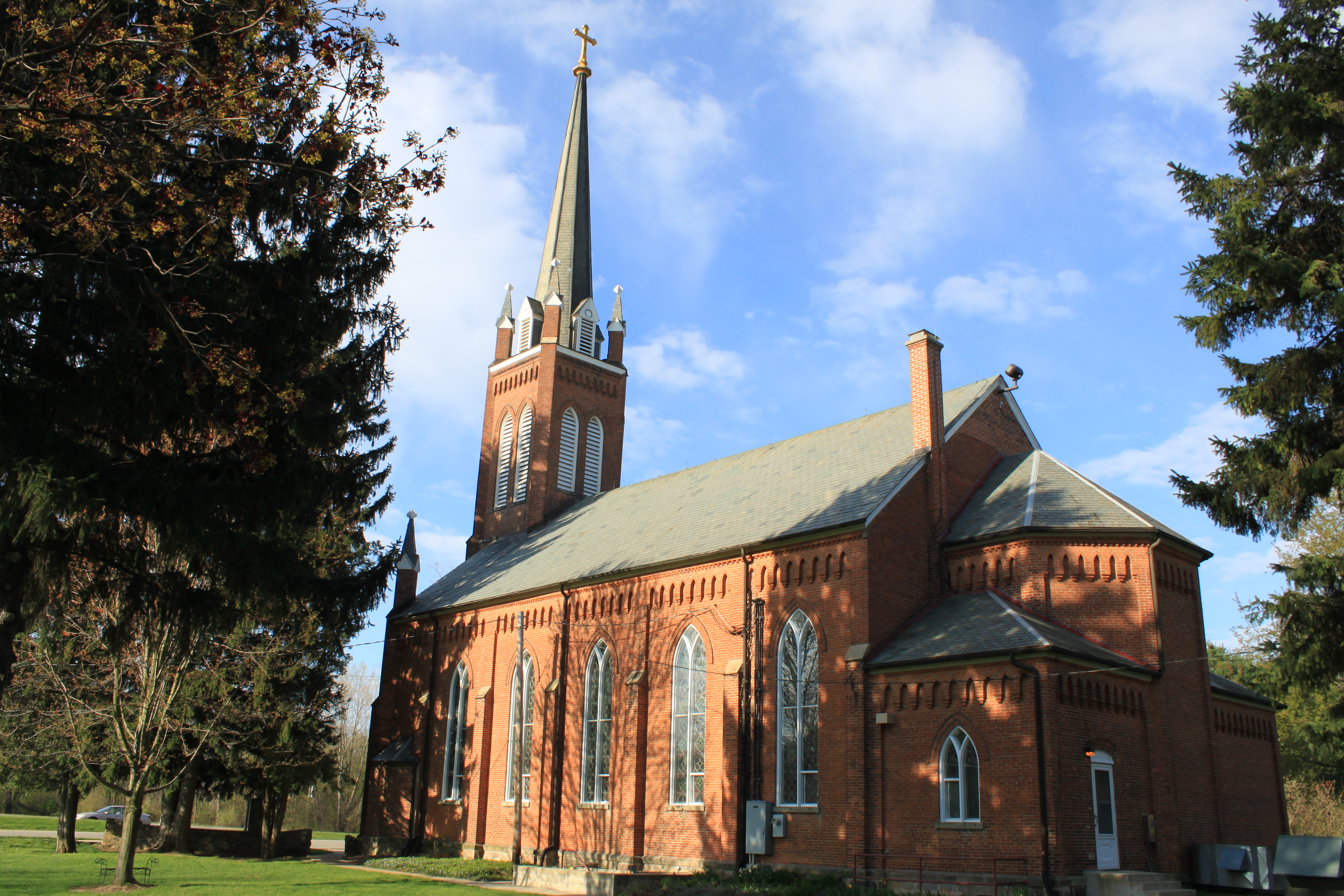
St. Patrick's Parish Complex

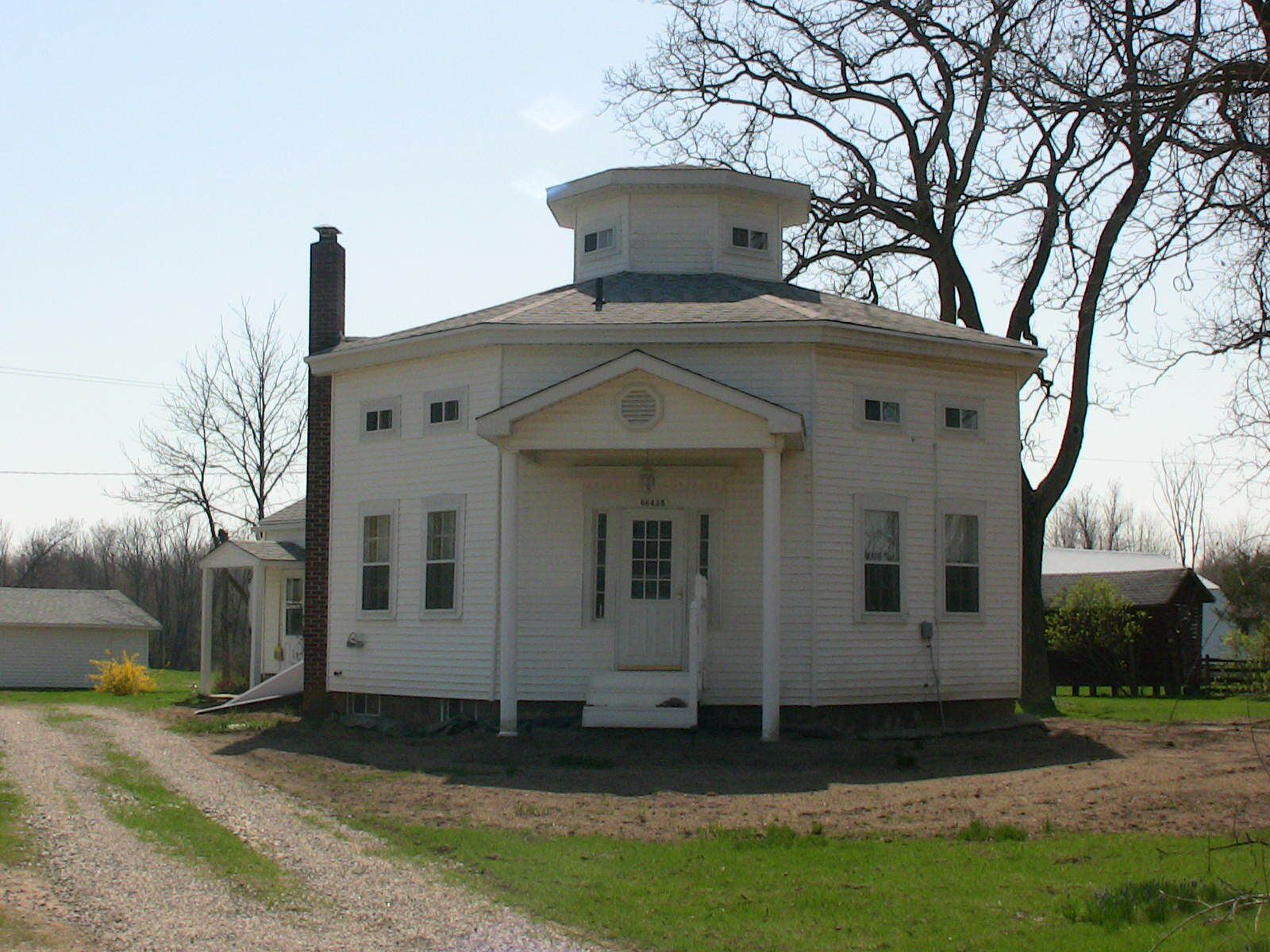
Nathan B. Devereaux Octagon House

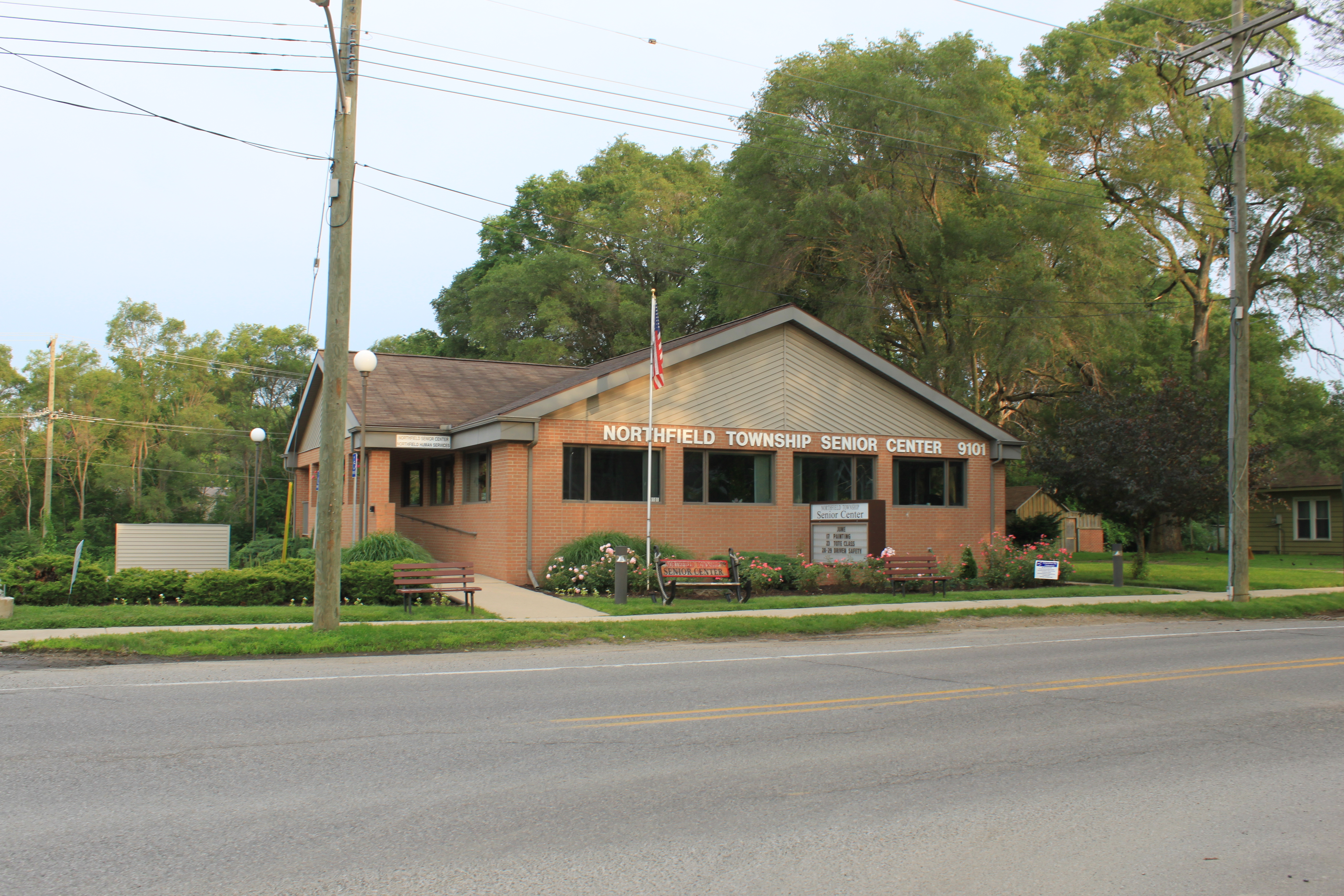
Northfield Township Senior Center
