= Dexter, Michigan =

- City
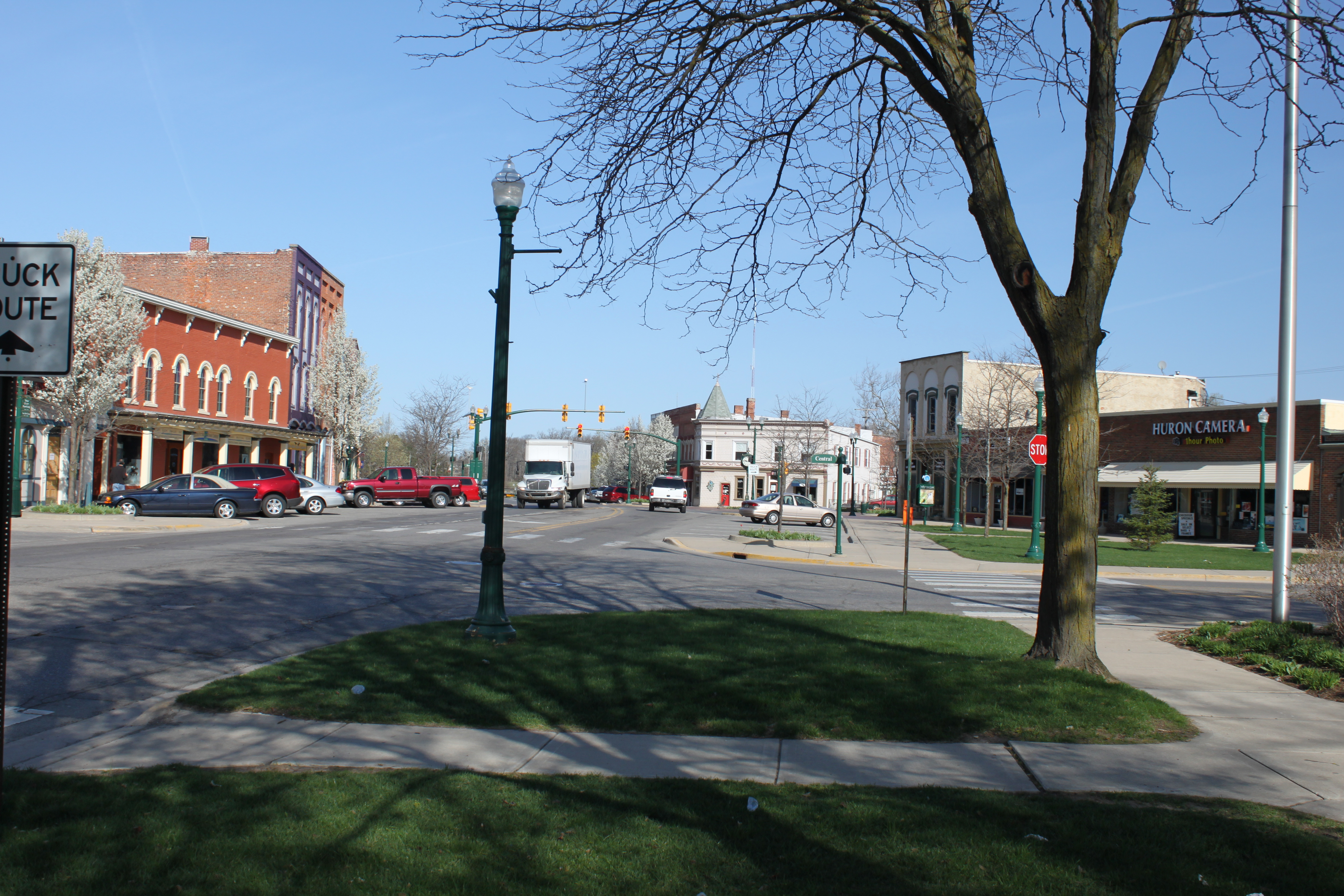
- Downtown Dexter along Ann Arbor Street

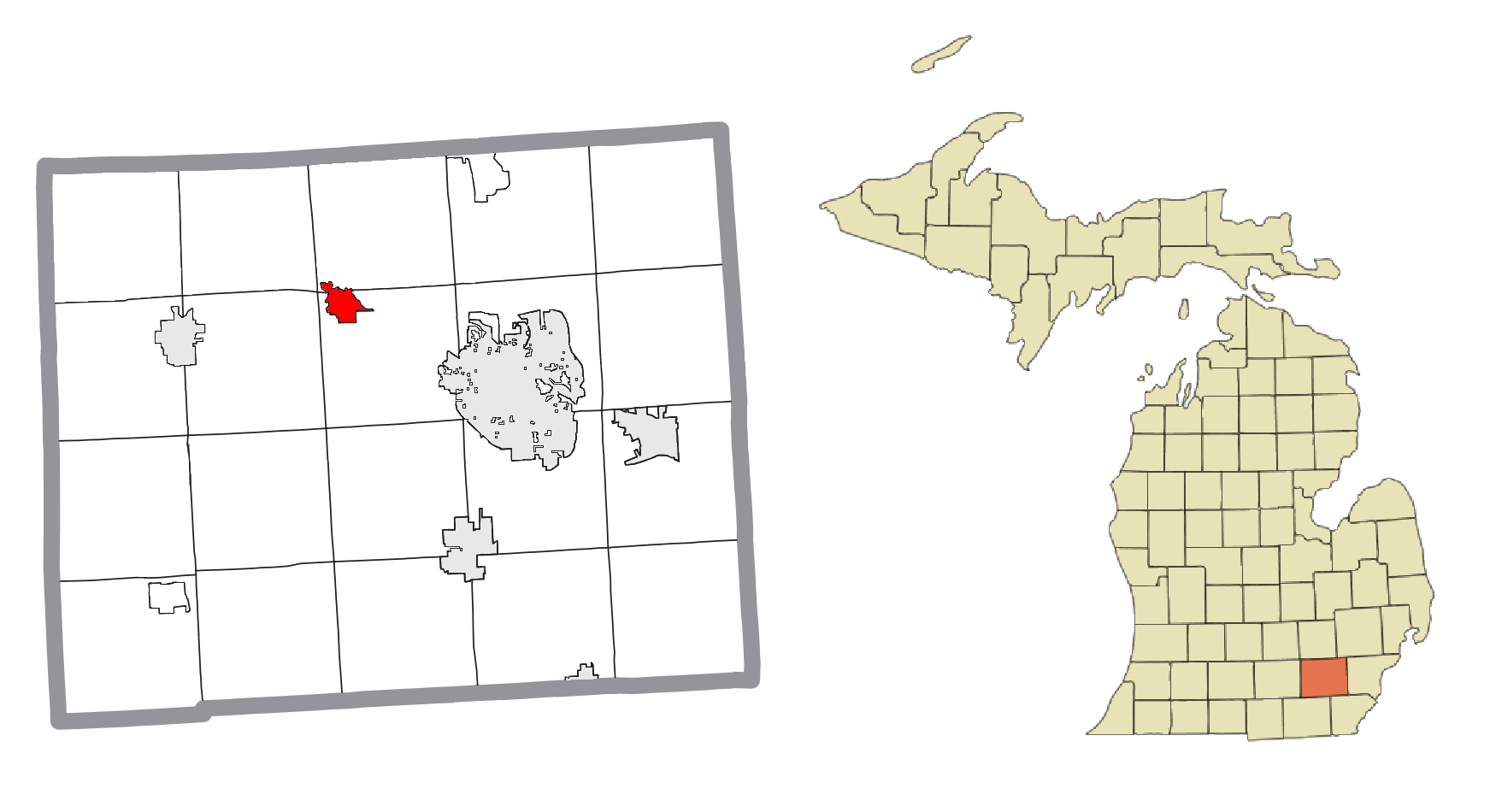
- Location within Washtenaw County

- Location within the state of Michigan Location within the United States
- Coordinates: 42°20′02″N 83°52′54″W
- Country: United States
- State: Michigan
- County: Washtenaw
- Settled: 1824
- Incorporated: 1830 (village); 2014 (city)

Government
  - Type: Council–manager
  - Mayor: Shawn Keough
  - Manager: Justin Breyer

Area
  - Total: 1.97 sq mi (5.09 km^{2})
  - Land: 1.94 sq mi (5.03 km^{2})
  - Water: 0.023 sq mi (0.06 km^{2})
- Elevation: 869 ft (265 m)

Population (2020)
  - Total: 4,500
- Time zone: UTC-5 (Eastern (EST))
  - Summer (DST): UTC-4 (EDT)
- ZIP code: 48130
- Area code: 734
- FIPS code: 26-22160
- GNIS feature ID: 0624624
- Website: dextermi.gov

Dexter is a city in Washtenaw County, in the U.S. state of Michigan. As of the 2020 United States census, the population was 4,500.

Established as a village in 1830, Dexter was incorporated as a city in 2014. It lies approximately nine miles northwest of Ann Arbor, the county seat of Washtenaw County, and 40 miles west of Detroit, the largest city in the state.

== History ==
The area that became Dexter was settled in 1824 by land speculator and lawyer Samuel W. Dexter, who purchased a tract of land at the confluence of Mill Creek and the Huron River. Prior to white settlement, the area was home to members of the Potawatomi tribe. Dexter was the village's first postmaster and became the first chief justice of Washtenaw County when it was formally organized in 1826, earning the nickname "Judge Dexter" for the rest of his life. The settlement, originally known as the Mill Creek Settlement, was officially platted in 1830 and renamed Dexter in honor of Dexter's father, Samuel Dexter, a former U.S. senator and cabinet member under President John Adams.

In the early 1840s, Dexter built a Greek Revival-style residence northwest of the village known as Gordon Hall (named after Dexter's mother, Catherine Gordon Dexter), which has since become a prominent local landmark. The property has been associated by historians with abolitionist activity and possible involvement with the Underground Railroad.

Many of the buildings in Dexter's downtown were constructed in the 1870s after a series of major fires along Main Street and the surrounding areas destroyed much of the original wood structures.

On March 20, 1966, the Dexter area was the site of a widely reported unidentified flying object sighting that received national media coverage. Multiple residents and law enforcement officers reported sightings of unexplained lights near marshlands north of Dexter. Working as a U.S. Air Force consultant, astronomer J. Allen Hynek attributed the sightings to atmospheric phenomena he described as "swamp gas". The explanation was met with plenty of skepticism and prompted then-Congressman Gerald R. Ford to call for a congressional investigation. The incident remains a notable episode in Dexter's modern history and reputation.

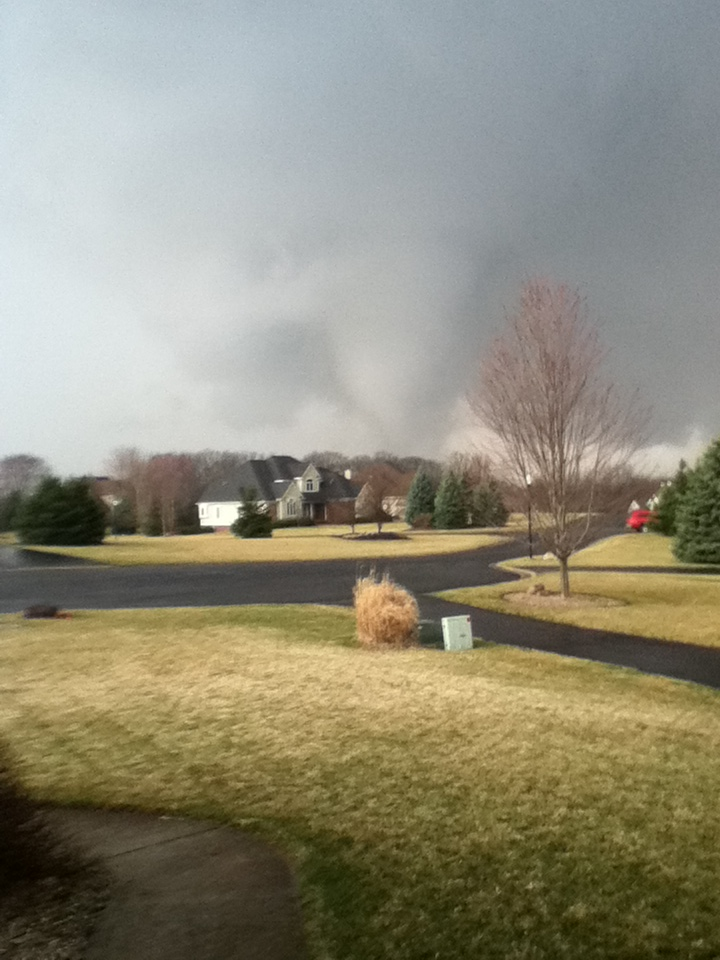
Tornado outside of Brass Creek

On March 15, 2012, an EF3 tornado struck Dexter and the surrounding area of Washtenaw County, producing wind speeds estimated at 135-140 mph and carving a path of damage over seven miles long. More than 250 residences were affected, and the area faced losses of approximately $12 million. No fatalities or serious injuries were reported, but the event was the most destructive tornado to impact Washtenaw County in decades and prompted a federal disaster response.

A 2014 survey completed by Eastern Michigan University recommended the Downtown Dexter Historic District as "likely eligible for listing in the National Register of Historic Places". Gordon Hall had been listed on the register since 1972.

Dexter residents voted on November 4, 2014, to adopt a city charter under Michigan's Home Rule Act, ending the municipality's status as a village. Officials cited increased administrative efficiency and the benefits of unified governance as primary motivations for the change, which was nearly a decade in the making.

== Geography ==
According to the U.S. Census Bureau, Dexter has a total area of 1.97 square miles (5.10 km^{2}), of which 1.94 square miles (5.02 km^{2}) is land and 0.03 square miles (0.08 km^{2}) (1.52%) is water.

Washtenaw County's Border-to-Border Trail runs through the city, which also contains small portions of two metro parks: Hudson Mills Metropark and Dexter–Huron Metropark.

The city is located along Mill Creek and the Huron River.

=== Adjacent municipalities ===
- Scio Township (east, south, and west)
- Webster Township (north)
- Dexter Township (northwest)

== Demographics ==
Historical population
Census	Pop.	Note	%±
1850	850		—
1860	856		0.7%
1870	1,161		35.6%
1880	1,008		−13.2%
1890	879		−12.8%
1900	900		2.4%
1910	726		−19.3%
1920	587		−19.1%
1930	894		52.3%
1940	1,087		21.6%
1950	1,307		20.2%
1960	1,702		30.2%
1970	1,729		1.6%
1980	1,524		−11.9%
1990	1,497		−1.8%
2000	2,338		56.2%
2010	4,067		74.0%
2020	4,500		10.6%
U.S. Decennial Census

=== 2020 census ===
As of the 2020 census, Dexter had a population of 4,500 and a population density of 2,284.3 inhabitants per square mile (882.0/km^{2}). The median age was 40.6 years. 26.2% of residents were under the age of 18 and 17.2% were 65 years of age or older. For every 100 females there were 88.1 males, and for every 100 females age 18 and over there were 85.3 males age 18 and over. Dexter's population grew 10.6% from 2010 to 2020.

99.4% of residents lived in urban areas, while 0.6% lived in rural areas.

There were 1,796 households in Dexter, of which 37.0% had children under the age of 18 living in them. Of all households, 53.6% were married-couple households, 13.5% were households with a male householder and no spouse or partner present, and 28.3% were households with a female householder and no spouse or partner present. About 28.7% of all households were made up of individuals and 13.4% had someone living alone who was 65 years of age or older.

There were 1,894 housing units, of which 5.2% were vacant. The homeowner vacancy rate was 1.3% and the rental vacancy rate was 2.8%.

Racial composition as of the 2020 census
Race	Number	Percent
White	3,972	88.3%
Black or African American	25	0.6%
American Indian and Alaska Native	9	0.2%
Asian	122	2.7%
Native Hawaiian and Other Pacific Islander	1	0.0%
Some other race	49	1.1%
Two or more races	322	7.2%
Hispanic or Latino (of any race)	215	4.8%

=== Income and poverty ===
The median household income was $106,637, and the median family income was $140,192. About 0.8% of families and 0.8% of the population were below the poverty line, including 0.0% of those under age 18 and 0.4% of those age 65 or over.

=== 2010 census ===
As of the 2010 census, there were 4,067 people, 1,590 households, and 1,067 families residing in the city. The population density was 2,174.9 inhabitants per square mile (839.7/km^{2}). There were 1,704 housing units at an average density of 911.2 per square mile (351.8/km^{2}). The racial makeup of the city was 92.7% White, 1.1% African American, 0.4% Native American, 2.8% Asian, 0.8% from other races, and 2.2% from two or more races. Hispanic or Latino people of any race were 2.8% of the population. Dexter's population grew 62.9% from 2000 to 2010, the largest growth in the state during that period.

The median age in the city was 36.2 years, and the gender makeup was 47.1% male and 52.9% female. 31% of residents were under the age of 18; 4.8% were between the ages of 18 and 24; 32.6% were from 25 to 44; 23.2% were from 45 to 64; and 8.6% were 65 years of age or older.

There were 1,590 households, of which 42.6% had children under the age of 18 living with them, 51.8% were married couples living together, 12.3% had a female householder with no husband present, 3.1% had a male householder with no wife present, and 32.9% were non-families. 28.2% of all households were made up of individuals, and 8.7% had someone living alone who was 65 years of age or older. The average household size was 2.56, and the average family size was 3.20.

=== 2000 census ===
At the 2000 census, there were 2,338 people, 1,013 households, and 641 families residing in the city. The population density was 1,236.7 inhabitants per square mile (477.5/km^{2}). There were 1,106 housing units at an average density of 585.0 per square mile (225.9/km^{2}). The racial makeup of the city was 96.58% White, 0.43% African American, 0.30% Native American, 1.03% Asian, 0.26% from other races, and 1.41% from two or more races. Hispanic or Latino people of any race were 0.98% of the population.

The median age in the city was 34 years, and the gender makeup was 48.7% male and 51.3% female. 26.4% of the population were under the age of 18, 6.6% from 18 to 24, 38.1% from 25 to 44, 19.0% from 45 to 64, and 9.8% were 65 years of age or older.

There were 1,013 households, of which 34.5% had children under the age of 18 living with them, 46.6% were married couples living together, 13.2% had a female householder with no husband present, and 36.7% were non-families. 32.3% of all households were made up of individuals, and 9.0% had someone living alone who was 65 years of age or older. The average household size was 2.31, and the average family size was 2.92.

The median household income was $50,510, and the median family income was $62,697. About 2.8% of families and 4.5% of the population were below the poverty line, including 6.3% of those under age 18 and 3.7% of those age 65 or over.

== Government ==
Dexter operates under a council–manager form of government, with legislative authority held by an elected mayor and six elected council members (all nonpartisan) and day-to-day administration handled by a council-appointed city manager.

Shawn Keough was elected as the city’s first mayor following Dexter’s incorporation as a city in 2014, after having served as village president since 2007. Keough was reelected to a second four-year term in 2022. As of 2026, Dexter's six city council members are Sanam Aldag, Wa-Louisa Hubbard, Pavlo Popov, Daniel Schlaff, Joseph Semifero, and Ray Tell. Two Dexter area students are appointed for one-year terms as student representatives to the council. Justin Breyer has been the city manager since 2021.

In addition to elected and administrative officials, Dexter maintains several appointed boards and commissions to assist with municipal governance and planning, including the Planning Commission, Downtown Development Authority, Parks and Recreation Commission, Tree Board, and Zoning Board of Appeals. Fire and rescue services are contracted to the Dexter Area Fire Department, while law enforcement services are contracted to the Washtenaw County Sheriff’s Office. The city operates municipal water and wastewater systems through its Department of Public Services.

Dexter is administered separately from Dexter Township, which sits northwest of the city and includes the unincorporated communities of Dover and Hudson Mills.

== Transportation ==
The Western-Washtenaw Area Value Express (WAVE) Community Connector Bus stops at several Dexter locations daily and on weekends. Its regular route travels between Chelsea and Ann Arbor, where it transfers to Ann Arbor Area Transportation Authority (TheRide) Bus #30.

Downtown Dexter's main thoroughfares were originally known as A, B, C, D, and E Streets. Today, these are known as Alpine, Broad, Central, Dover, and Edison Streets. Residential areas in Dexter include the original settlements along Baker Road, Central Street, and Dexter-Ann Arbor Road, as well as newer subdivisions and condominiums. The city has 411 on-street public parking spaces and more than 300 spaces across six public parking lots, the largest of which (Main St.) has 175 spaces. Parking is free throughout the city.

Dexter-Ann Arbor Road, the primary roadway between the two cities, was originally designated state highway M-132 in 1931 as part of an early network of spur routes intended to improve regional connectivity. The route lost its state highway status and was returned to local control in 1960 after the expansion of the Interstate and freeway systems. The Chicago-Montreal Highway, proposed by state officials in the 1930s to stretch from New Buffalo to Port Huron, was planned to pass through Dexter as part of a new diagonal trunkline route. With the exception of a few constructed bypasses, no work on the Chicago-Montreal Highway was ever completed.

The city used to have a train depot, built in 1841 when the Michigan Central Railroad came through Dexter while running between Detroit and St. Joseph (or Chicago), but no trains currently stop there. Today, the station is home to the Ann Arbor Model Railroad Club. Amtrak's Wolverine service between Chicago and Pontiac travels through the city, with a stop in nearby Ann Arbor.

== Education ==
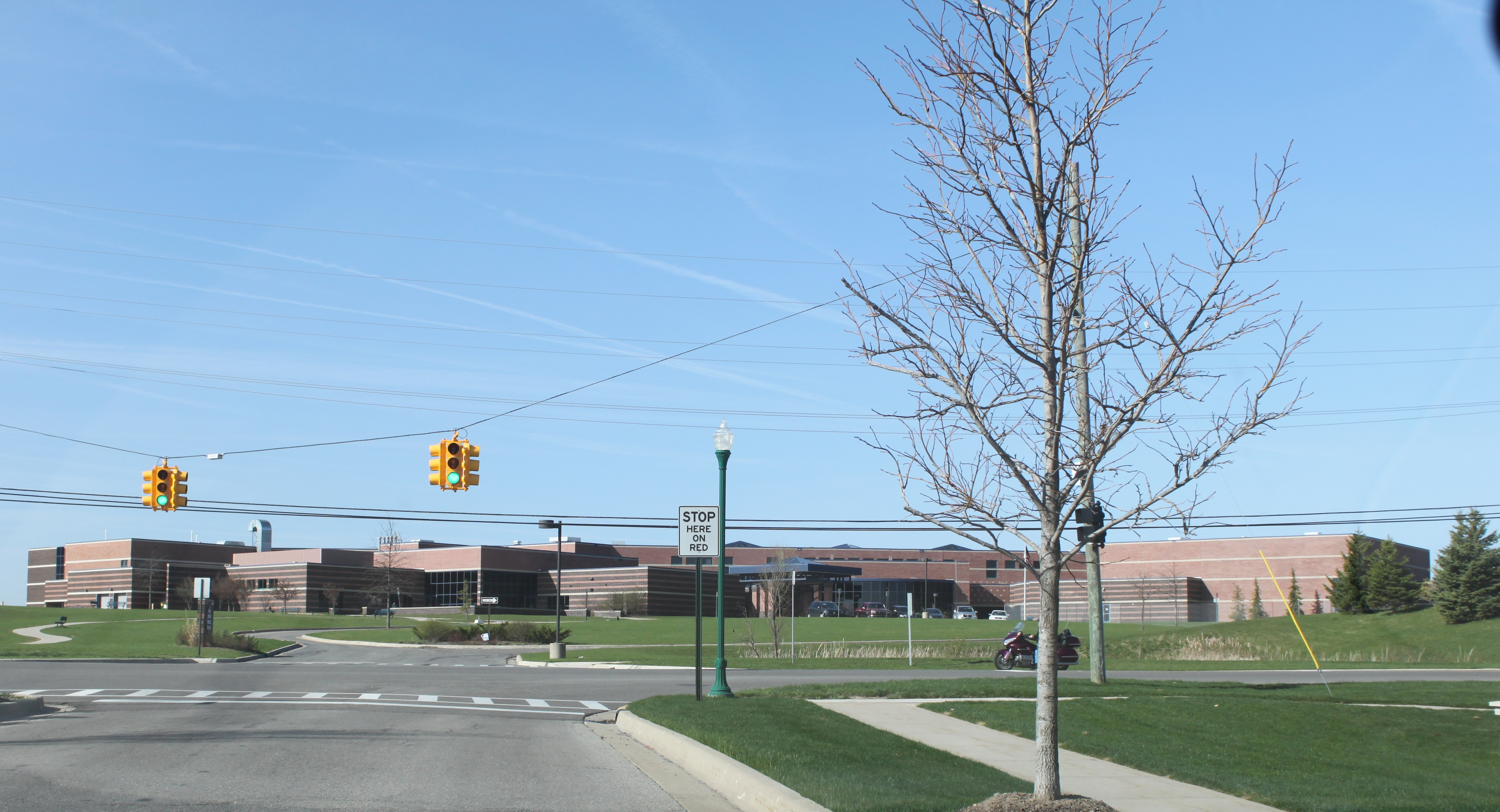
Mill Creek Middle School

Dexter Community Schools (DCS) is the public school district that includes the city of Dexter and the surrounding rural areas in Washtenaw and Livingston counties. Dexter High School was ranked 37th among high schools in Michigan by U.S. News & World Report in 2025. DCS is part of the larger Washtenaw Intermediate School District, which serves most of the county.

Dexter is also served by several nearby private and charter schools, including Daycroft School, Emerson School, and Honey Creek Community School. The Dexter Cooperative Nursery School is a non-profit community-run preschool.

Since 2012, Dexter High School has offered an International Baccalaureate Diploma Programme.

== Arts and culture ==
The Encore Musical Theatre Company was founded in 2008 by Broadway actor and Michigan native Dan Cooney, along with Anne and Paul Koch, at 3126 Broad Street. The company operates as a nonprofit organization and stages professional musical theatre productions featuring a mix of Broadway performers and local talent. Encore is recognized by the Actors' Equity Association. In 2020, Encore purchased the historic Copeland Building at 7714 Ann Arbor Street from Dexter Community Schools as part of a long-term plan to establish a permanent performance venue in downtown Dexter.

The Dexter Area Historical Society preserves the city's local history through exhibits, educational programming, and public events. The organization is involved in the stewardship of historic properties and supports community efforts to document and share Dexter’s historical and cultural heritage.

The Dexter Summer Festival is an annual community festival held in downtown Dexter. Formerly called Dexter Daze, the event was rebranded in 2024. The two-day summer celebration features live music, food vendors, artisans from across Michigan, games, and family-friendly activities, and is one of the city’s largest recurring community events.

The Dexter Cider Mill, established in 1886, claims to be the oldest continuously operating cider mill in the state. Located along the Huron River, it serves as a popular attraction for residents and visitors.

== Media ==
The Sun Times News, a weekly newspaper covering Dexter, Chelsea, and other nearby cities in Washtenaw County, is the primary print newspaper dedicated to Dexter. The paper is delivered for free to over 30,000 residences and over 1,500 businesses in the area. In 2025, the Sun Times was acquired by TrUiC (The Really Useful Information Company), which assumed responsibility for the paper's business operations.

Regional coverage of Dexter is provided by The Ann Arbor News through MLive.com, which regularly reports on Dexter-area government, development, and community events.

The Dexter Leader was a weekly newspaper founded in 1869. In 1995, it was absorbed by the Chelsea Standard after Detroit-based Heritage Newspapers purchased both papers from Walter and Helen Leonard, a married couple who had owned and operated both papers since 1947. The Standard and Leader were sold six years later, along with the Saline Reporter, Milan News-Leader, Manchester Enterprise, and Ypsilanti Courier, after the death of Heritage owner and founder Heinz Prechter in 2001. The papers passed through various stages of bankruptcy and ownership, eventually merging into a single publication, Washtenaw Now, under the ownership of Digital First Media, a newspaper publisher owned by hedge fund Alden Global Capital. Washtenaw Now shut down in June 2015 after just 14 months of publication, 146 years after the Leader was founded.

The first newspaper in Dexter was the Western Emigrant, printed by Judge Samuel Dexter in 1829. The Emigrant evolved over the years and by 1835 was known as the State Journal (not to be confused with the current Lansing State Journal).

Dexter High School publishes The Squall, a student-run newspaper that primarily serves the school community but offers subscriptions to local residents.

== Athletics ==
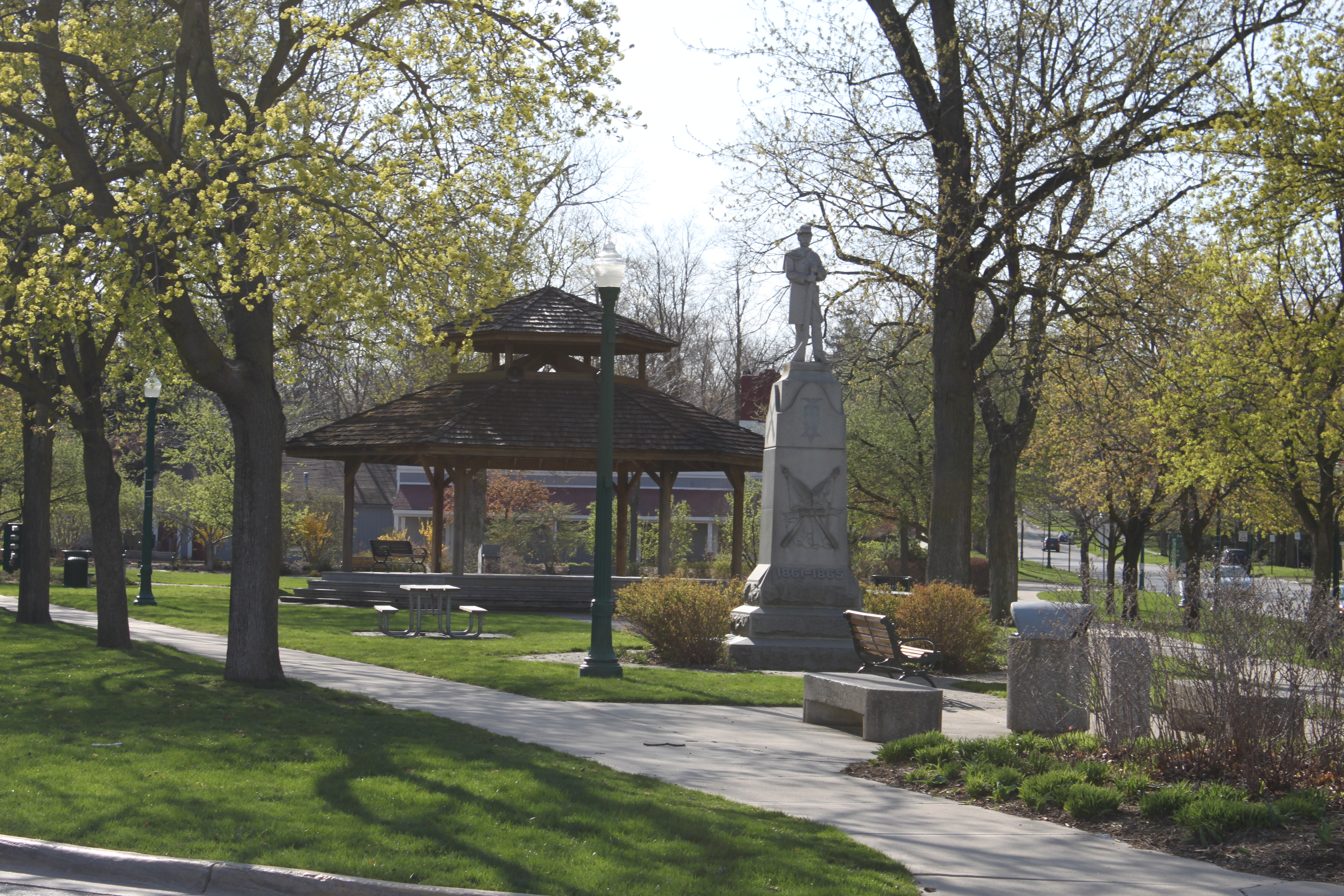
Monument Park

In 2025, the Dexter High School Dreadnaughts football team made their first-ever Michigan High School Athletic Association (MHSAA) Division 2 state championship appearance, losing 51-14 to Orchard Lake St. Mary's in the championship game at Ford Field. Dexter's men's cross country team won five consecutive MHSAA state championships from 2002 to 2006, tying the state record for most consecutive titles. Other notable high school sports programs include field hockey, soccer, and water polo.

Founded in 1978, the Dexter Ringers Horseshoe Club is a long-running competitive horseshoe league that plays its annual summer season at First Street Park on Edison Street in Dexter. The club welcomes participants from Dexter and surrounding communities and donates the proceeds from each season to charitable causes.

The Dexter Baseball Club, which later became Dexter Little League (DLL), was formed in 2003 and is the local youth baseball and softball organization serving the Dexter area. The DLL hosted the 8-10 boys' state baseball tournament in 2019.

Since 2011, Dexter has been home to a vintage base ball team, the Union Base Ball Club of Dexter, which competes using 19th-century rules, uniforms, and equipment.

== Notable people ==
- Cole Cabana, American football running back who was part of Michigan's 2023 national championship team
- Dr. Royal S. Copeland, U.S. senator from New York and sponsor of early food and drug legislation
- Benny Frey, a Major League Baseball player who pitched for the Cincinnati Reds
- Arthur Hills, golf course architect
- Harrison Jeffords, colonel in the Union Army and a hero of the Battle of Gettysburg
- Mark Koernke, right-wing militia movement leader and conspiracy theorist
- Rob Malda, open-source software proponent and founder of Slashdot
- Katharine Dexter McCormick, biologist, women's suffragette, and philanthropist; known as the "mother of the pill," she funded the research that led to the birth control pill (along with Margaret Sanger)
- Edie Parker, Beat figure and wife of Jack Kerouac; Kerouac-Parker's family owned the Oak Ridge Farm in Dexter
- Milo Radulovich, a symbol of 1950s Red Scare resistance who was featured on journalist Edward R. Murrow's October 20, 1953, episode of See It Now
- Abigail Tamer, Olympic field hockey player and member of the United States women’s national field hockey team
