= Whitmore Lake, Michigan =

- Census-designated place (CDP) & unincorporated community
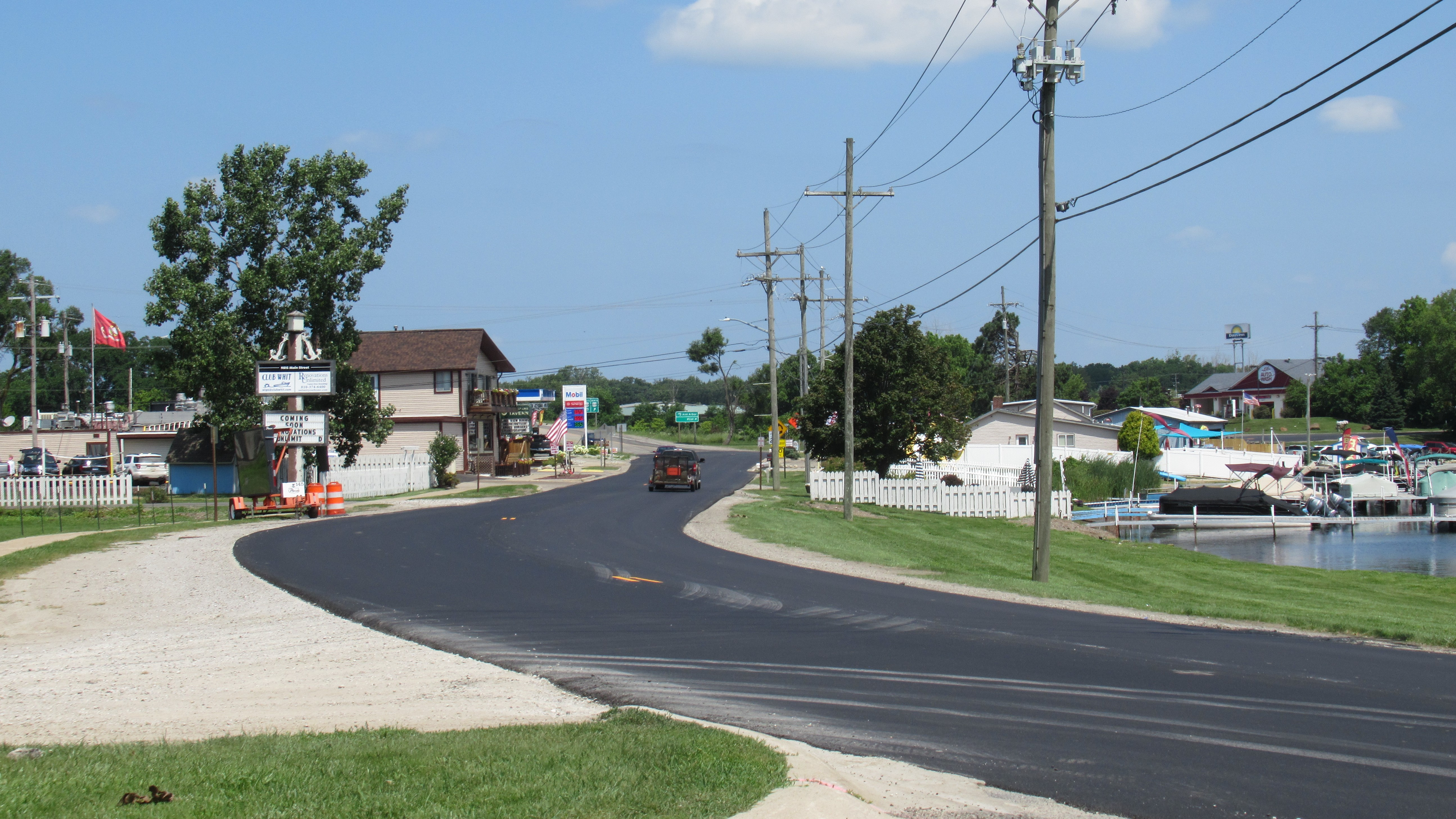
- Looking north along Main Street

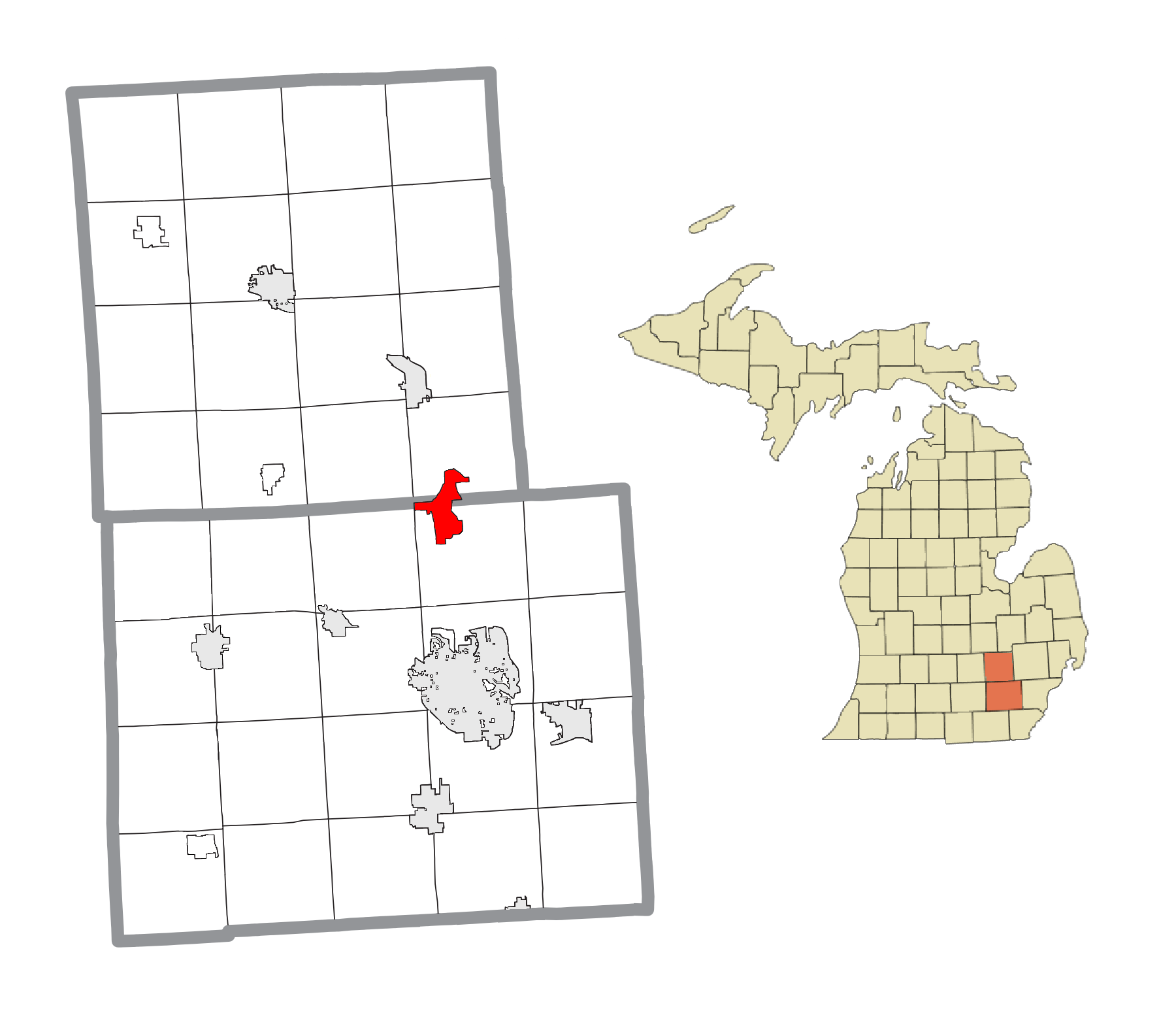
- Location within Washtenaw County (bottom) and Livingston County (top)

- Location within the state of Michigan Whitmore Lake (the United States)
- Coordinates: 42°26′23″N 83°44′38″W
- Country: United States
- State: Michigan
- Counties: Livingston and Washtenaw
- Townships: Green Oak and Northfield
- Settled: 1825

Area
  - Total: 6.01 sq mi (15.56 km^{2})
  - Land: 4.80 sq mi (12.42 km^{2})
  - Water: 1.21 sq mi (3.14 km^{2}) 20.37%
- Elevation: 928 ft (283 m)

Population (2020)
  - Total: 7,584
  - Density: 1,583.3/sq mi (611.3/km^{2})
- Time zone: UTC-5 (EST)
  - Summer (DST): UTC-4 (EDT)
- ZIP code(s): 48178 (South Lyon); 48189
- Area code: 734
- FIPS code: 26-87060
- GNIS feature ID: 1616386

Whitmore Lake is a census-designated place (CDP) and unincorporated community in the U.S. state of Michigan. The community spans the boundary between Green Oak Township in Livingston County and Northfield Township in Washtenaw County. The population of the CDP was 7,584 at the 2020 census.

== History ==
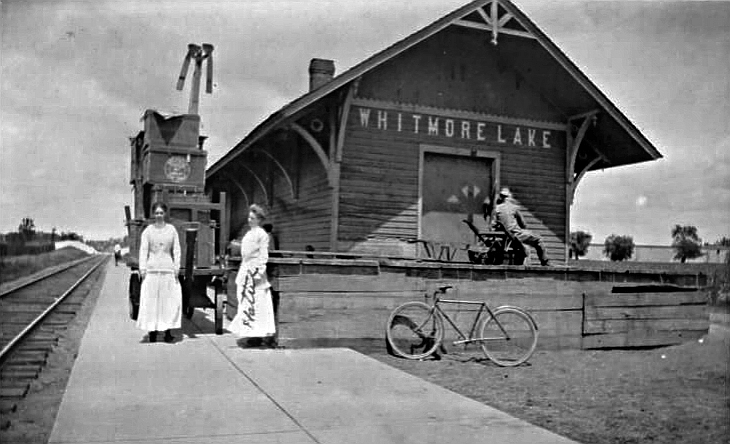
Former railroad depot

The area was first settled by land surveyors Johnathon Stratton and Luke Whitmore, who came here from nearby Ann Arbor settlement in 1825. Stratton suggested the name of the new area and the surrounding lake as Whitmore, and it became mapped under that name. In 1829, Whitmore owned land in the area and became the first county treasurer. A post office began operating here on June 9, 1834, with George Dexter serving as the first postmaster. The post office was first named Northfield after its northern location in Northfield Township, but it was changed to Whitmore Lake on December 27, 1854.

== Geography ==
According to the United States Census Bureau, the CDP has a total area of 5.3 square miles (13.7 km^{2}), of which 4.2 square miles (10.9 km^{2}) is land and 1.1 square miles (2.8 km^{2}), or 20.37%, is water.

The community is located about 9 miles (14 km) north of Ann Arbor and about 9 miles (14 km) south of Brighton. It is situated around the shores of Whitmore Lake, and the CDP also includes the area around the smaller Horseshoe Lake to the south, Lawton Lake to the east and Monahan Lake to the northeast.

=== Major highways ===
- US 23 runs south–north and forms most of the western boundary of the CDP.
- M-36 has its eastern terminus with US 23 in Whitmore Lake.
- Several of the Mile Roads have their western ends within Whitmore Lake, including 6 Mile Road, 7 Mile Road, 8 Mile Road, and 9 Mile Road.

== Demographics ==
Historical population
Census	Pop.	Note	%±
1990	3,251		—
2000	6,574		102.2%
2010	6,423		−2.3%
2020	7,584		18.1%
U.S. Decennial Census

=== 2020 census ===
As of the 2020 census, Whitmore Lake had a population of 7,584. The median age was 38.8 years. 19.6% of residents were under the age of 18 and 14.5% of residents were 65 years of age or older. For every 100 females there were 98.6 males, and for every 100 females age 18 and over there were 97.6 males age 18 and over.

99.0% of residents lived in urban areas, while 1.0% lived in rural areas.

There were 3,288 households in Whitmore Lake, of which 25.9% had children under the age of 18 living in them. Of all households, 44.4% were married-couple households, 22.3% were households with a male householder and no spouse or partner present, and 23.2% were households with a female householder and no spouse or partner present. About 29.0% of all households were made up of individuals and 9.1% had someone living alone who was 65 years of age or older.

There were 3,489 housing units, of which 5.8% were vacant. The homeowner vacancy rate was 0.3% and the rental vacancy rate was 7.0%.

Racial composition as of the 2020 census
Race	Number	Percent
White	6,813	89.8%
Black or African American	104	1.4%
American Indian and Alaska Native	39	0.5%
Asian	52	0.7%
Native Hawaiian and Other Pacific Islander	0	0.0%
Some other race	55	0.7%
Two or more races	521	6.9%
Hispanic or Latino (of any race)	267	3.5%

=== 2000 census ===
As of the 2000 census, there were 6,574 people, 2,663 households, and 1,741 families residing in the CDP. The population density was 1,508.5 inhabitants per square mile (582.4/km^{2}). There were 2,960 housing units at an average density of 679.2 per square mile (262.2/km^{2}). The racial makeup of the CDP was 96.05% White, 0.93% African American, 0.46% Native American, 0.47% Asian, 0.12% Pacific Islander, 0.23% from other races, and 1.75% from two or more races. Hispanic or Latino of any race were 1.46% of the population.

There were 2,663 households, out of which 32.7% had children under the age of 18 living with them, 51.7% were married couples living together, 9.4% had a female householder with no husband present, and 34.6% were non-families. 25.8% of all households were made up of individuals, and 4.1% had someone living alone who was 65 years of age or older. The average household size was 2.42 and the average family size was 2.94.

In the CDP, 24.5% of the population was under the age of 18, 7.7% was from 18 to 24, 39.2% from 25 to 44, 20.9% from 45 to 64, and 7.7% were 65 years of age or older. The median age was 34 years. For every 100 females, there were 102.6 males. For every 100 females age 18 and over, there were 98.7 males.

The median income for a household in the CDP was $51,504, and the median income for a family was $63,113. Males had a median income of $42,174 versus $28,865 for females. The per capita income for the CDP was $26,066. About 3.5% of families and 5.2% of the population were below the poverty line, including 5.8% of those under age 18 and 2.2% of those age 65 or over.

== Arts and culture ==
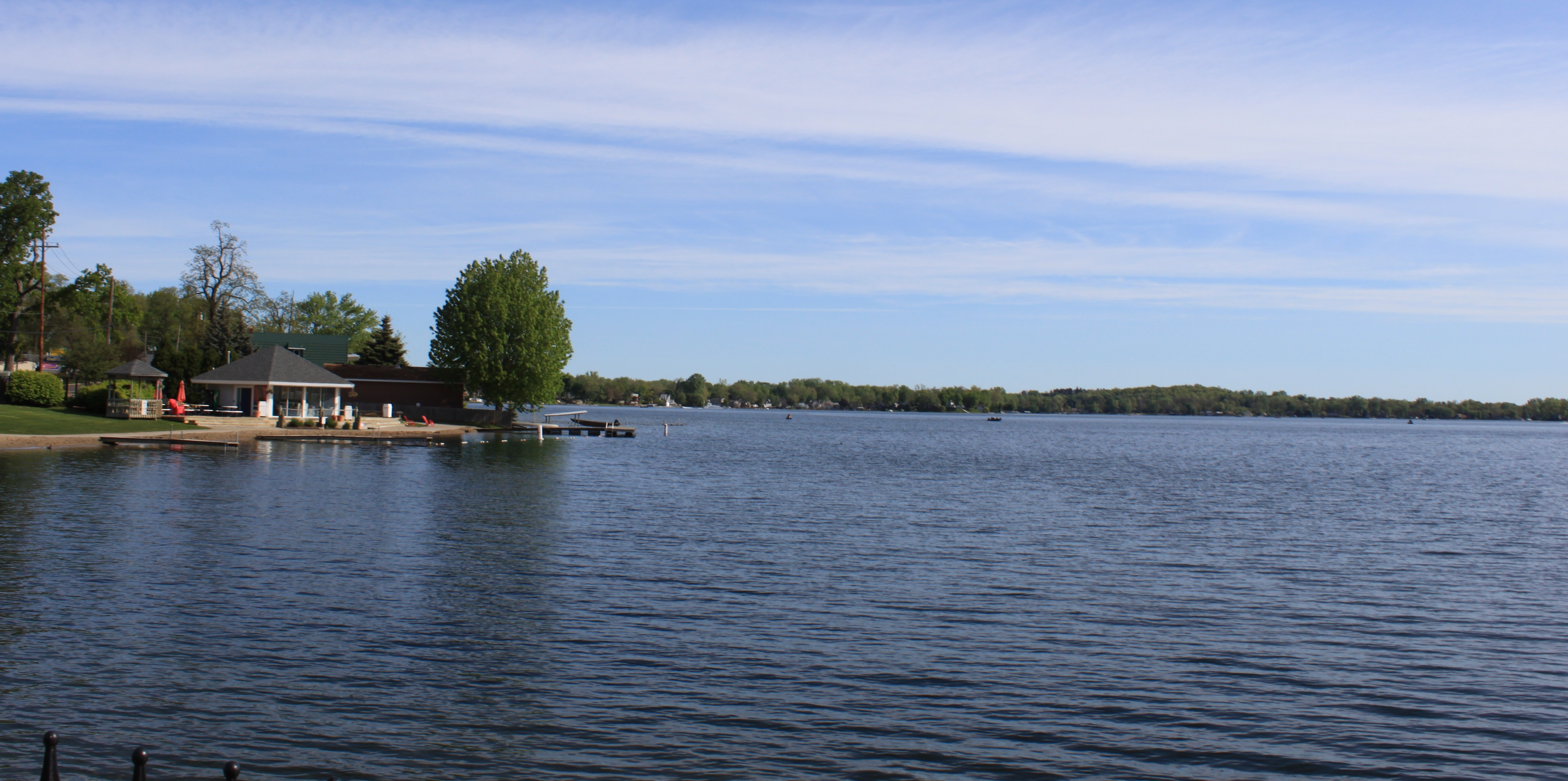
Whitmore Lake

=== Fourth of July celebration ===
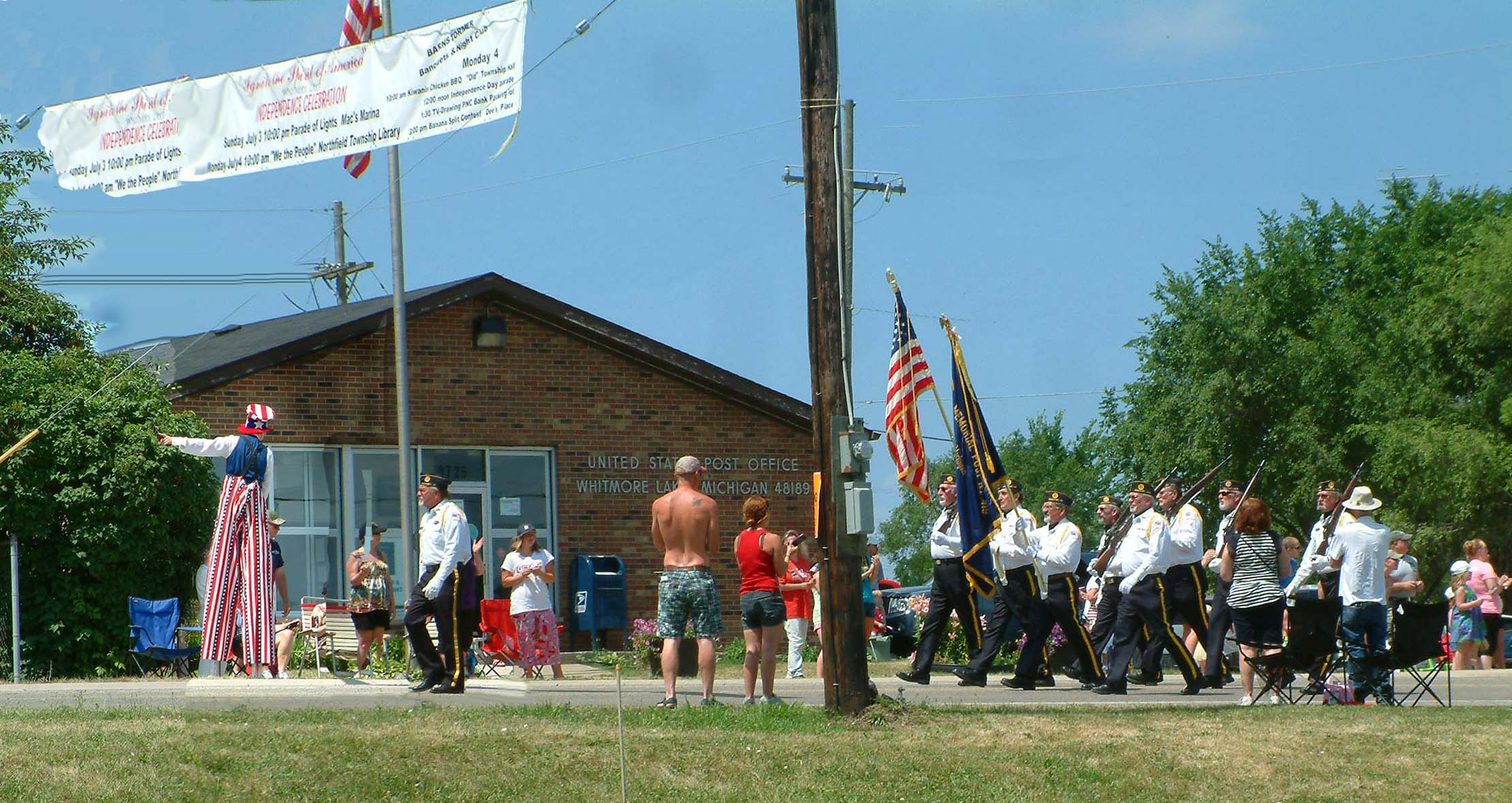
4th of July parade, 2011

Each year Whitmore Lake hosts a weekend-long celebration for Independence Day. In 2011 it marked its 52nd year with the theme "Ignite the Spirit of America". Typical events include a fireworks display over the lake, a boat parade, a water skiing show performed by the Whitmore Lake Water Ski Club, a running / swimming race, and many other events.

=== Harvest Festival ===
The Whitmore Lake Harvest Festival is a two-day event that occurs annually at the end of September, and was first established in 2007. The primary function of the 2009 Harvest Festival was to adopt a pet or donate money towards that cause.

=== Michigan Pond Hockey Classic ===
The Michigan Pond Hockey Classic is an annual adult pond hockey tournament held on Whitmore Lake. Established in 2008, the event raises funds for families and schools to support youth participation in athletics.

== Education ==
Within Washtenaw County, all portions of the CDP are in the Whitmore Lake Public Schools school district. Within Livingston County, a portion of the CDP is in the Whitmore Lake district, while other parts are in the South Lyon Community Schools and the Brighton Area Schools school districts.

The Whitmore Lake High School Trojans are members of the Tri-County Conference.

== Notable people ==
- Dave Alexander, musician, member of the highly influential band The Stooges, born in Whitmore Lake
