= Lyon Township, Oakland County, Michigan =

Lyon Township, Michigan
- Charter township
- Lyon Charter Township
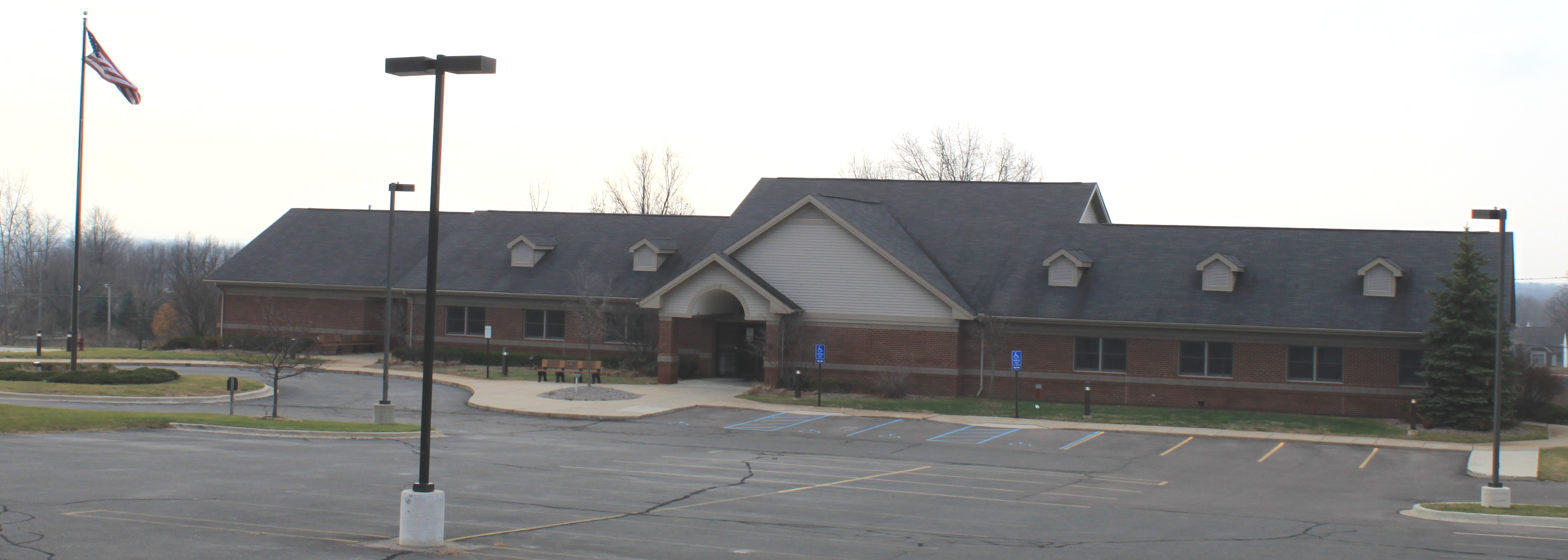
- Lyon Township Municipal Center

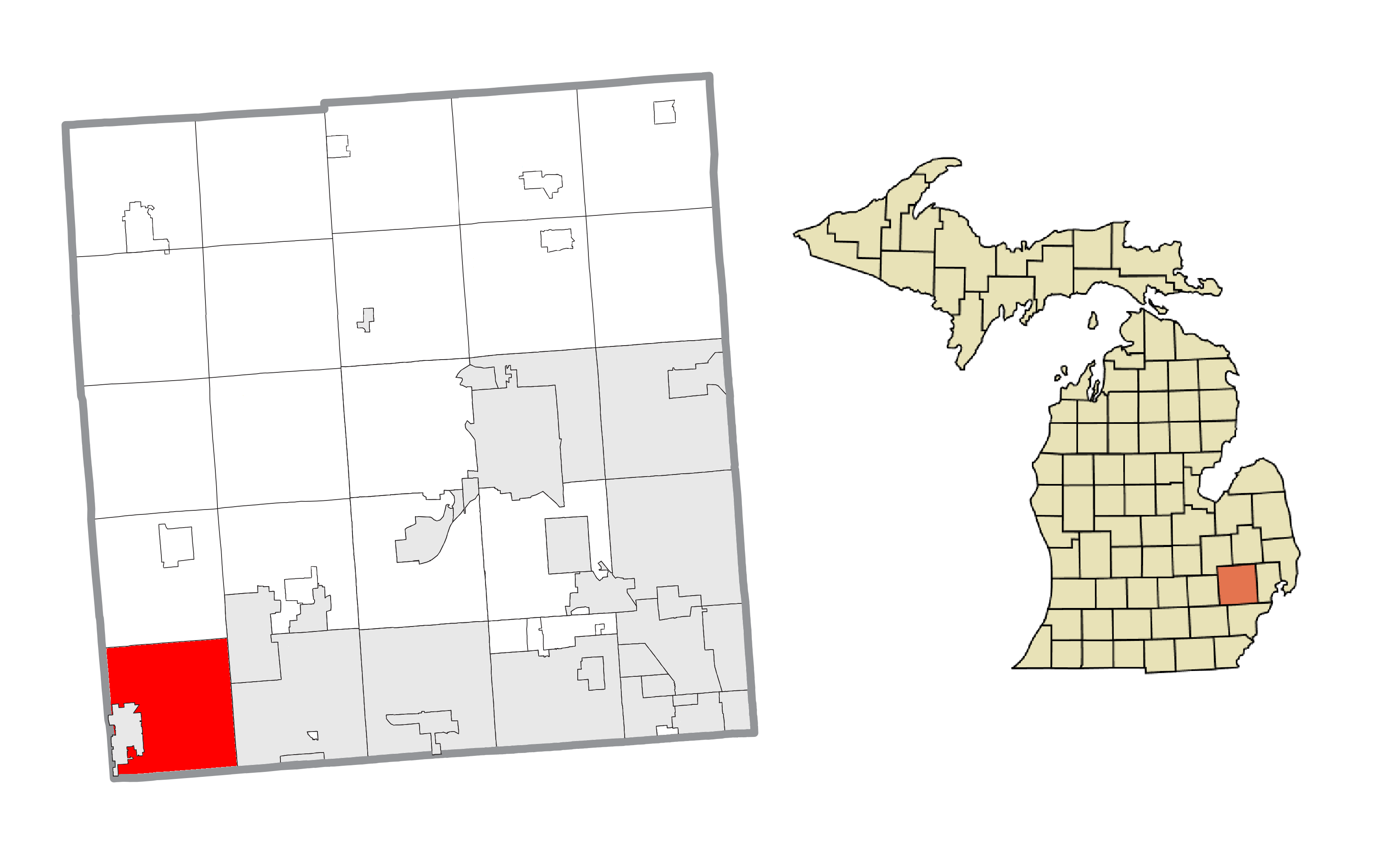
- Location within Oakland County

- Location within the state of Michigan
- Coordinates: 42°29′03″N 83°37′19″W
- Country: United States
- State: Michigan
- County: Oakland
- Established: 1834

Government
  - Supervisor: John Dolan

Area
  - Charter township: 32.0 sq mi (82.8 km^{2})
  - Land: 31.4 sq mi (81.2 km^{2})
  - Water: 0.66 sq mi (1.7 km^{2})
- Elevation: 942 ft (287 m)

Population (2020)
  - Charter township: 23,271
  - Density: 742/sq mi (287/km^{2})
  - Metro: 4,296,250 (Metro Detroit)
- Time zone: UTC-5 (Eastern (EST))
  - Summer (DST): UTC-4 (EDT)
- ZIP code(s): 48165, 48167, 48178, 48381, 48393
- Area code: 248
- FIPS code: 26-49820
- GNIS feature ID: 1626650
- Website: Official website

Lyon Charter Township is a charter township of Oakland County in the U.S. state of Michigan. The population was 23,271 at the 2020 census.

== Geography ==
According to the United States Census Bureau, the township has a total area of 32.0 square miles (83 km^{2}), of which 31.3 square miles (81 km^{2}) is land and 0.6 square miles (1.6 km^{2}), or 2.00%, is water.

=== Communities ===
The city of South Lyon is located on the west side of the township.

Within the township proper there are two unincorporated communities. New Hudson, centered around the junction of Grand River Avenue, Pontiac Trail, and S. Milford Road, just south of exit 155 on I-96 at 42°30′39″N 83°36′56″W. In 1830, Russell Alvord and Daniel Richards, from the state of New York, obtained 40 acres (160,000 m^{2}) of land with the deed signed by U.S. President Andrew Jackson. In 1831, they opened an inn called the "Old Tavern" (still in existence as the New Hudson Inn). This served as a changing point on the stage coach line known as the New Hudson Station. A stage line post office was established in 1834. A U.S. government post office was established in June 1852. The community was platted by Russell Alvord in 1837. Kensington, a former village that is now Kensington Metropark.

== Demographics ==
As of the census of 2000, there were 11,041 people, 3,887 households, and 3,055 families residing in the township. The population density was 352.3 inhabitants per square mile (136.0/km^{2}). There were 4,065 housing units at an average density of 129.7 per square mile (50.1/km^{2}). The racial makeup of the township was 97.10% White, 0.35% African American, 0.41% Native American, 0.61% Asian, 0.04% Pacific Islander, 0.45% from other races, and 1.04% from two or more races. Hispanic or Latino residents of any race were 1.47% of the population.

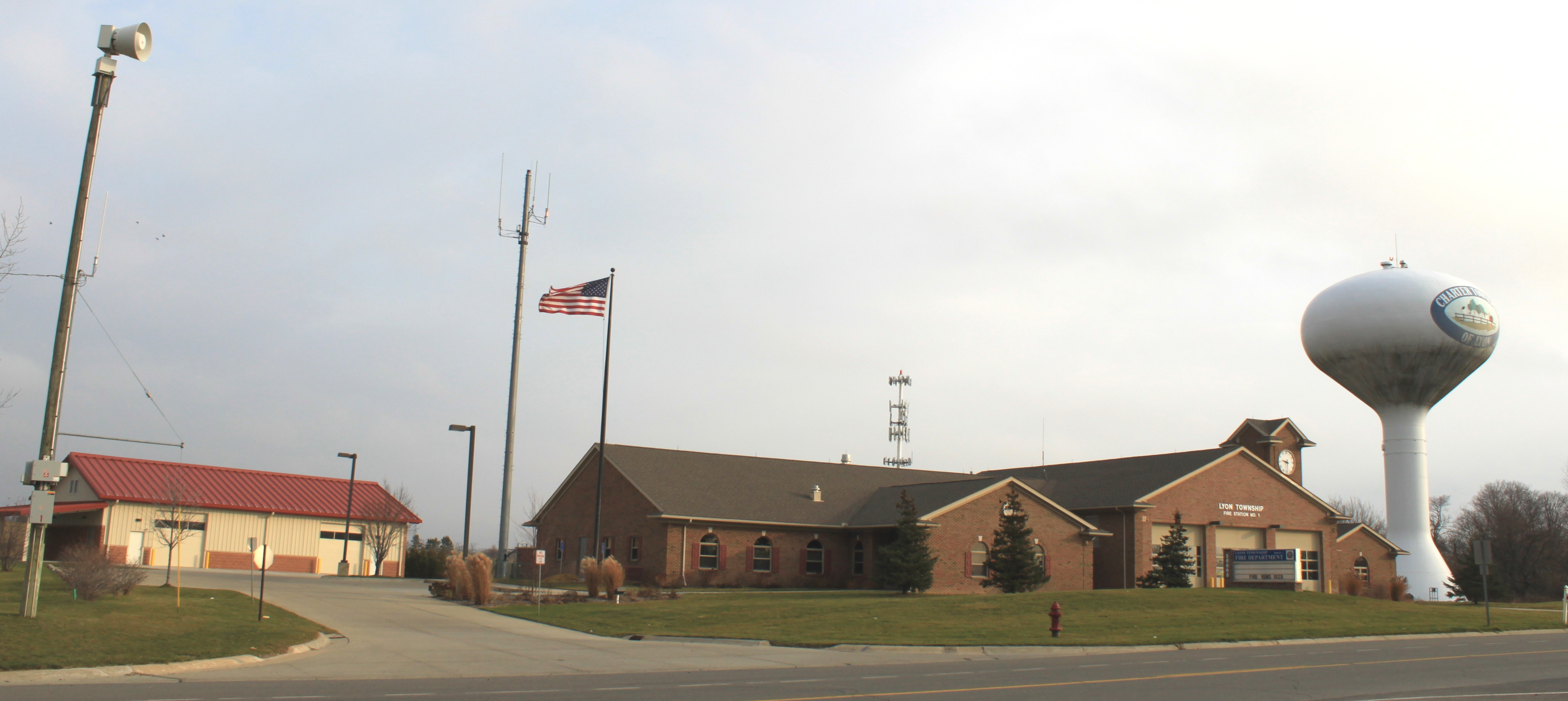
Fire Station #1, Grand River Ave.

There were 3,887 households, out of which 41.9% had children under the age of 18 living with them, 68.2% were married couples living together, 7.3% had a female householder with no husband present, and 21.4% were non-families. 16.9% of all households were made up of individuals, and 4.2% had someone living alone who was 65 years of age or older. The average household size was 2.83 and the average family size was 3.21.

In the township, 28.8% of the population was under the age of 18, 7.3% from 18 to 24, 34.1% from 25 to 44, 23.1% from 45 to 64, and 6.8% was 65 years of age or older. The median age was 35 years. For every 100 females, there were 103.1 males. For every 100 females age 18 and over, there were 101.4 males.

The median income for a household in the township was $67,288, and the median income for a family was $76,045. Males had a median income of $56,418 versus $31,565 for females. The per capita income for the township was $27,414. About 3.4% of families and 4.2% of the population were below the poverty line, including 3.8% of those under age 18 and 11.4% of those age 65 or over.

== Economy ==
Testek Inc. is located in the Quadrants Research Park. Established in 1969 by engineers, the company designs and builds custom test equipment for the aerospace, industrial and alternative energy industries. Testek is a large defense supplier to the US military.

Bielomatik, Inc. is located in the Lyon Industrial Research Park. The company designs and builds plastic welding machinery, primarily for the automotive market. Specialties include hotplate fuel tank welding, linear vibration welding and traditional hotplate welding on a variety of scales.

Pratt Miller Engineering is located in New Hudson and, in addition to an arms division that was established in 2013, is best known as the operators of the Corvette Racing motorsports team.

== Arts and culture ==
Man in the City was a large public sculpture erected atop a hill in Atchison Park in 2011. Visible from westbound I-96, the 20-foot tall (6.1 m), 1,500-to-2,000-pound metal sculpture (680 to 910 kg) depicted the silhouette of a nondescript man in a suit and fedora. The Lyon Township Parks and Recreation Master Plan was revised in 2014 and the concept of Art in the Park was deleted. A pair of garden lights were added in 2023 when the structure was repainted. Around July 4, 2024, the sculpture lay where it fell after being cut off at the supporting base. After initial news reports describe the toppling as vandalism, the artist, John Sauve, received a letter from an attorney representing the township informing him that they were responsible. Due to ongoing maintenance and certain other concerns, they had made the decision to have the maintenance crew cut it down and have it removed from their property.

== Education ==
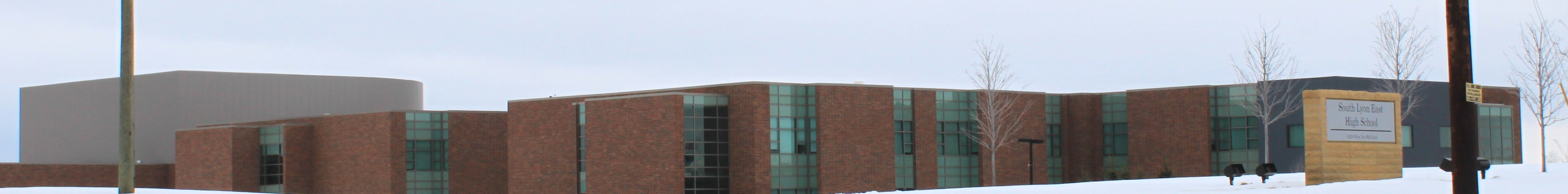
South Lyon East High School

Sections of the township attend South Lyon Community Schools. South Lyon East High School is located within Lyon Township.

A portion of the township is zoned to Northville Public Schools. Residents of that section are zoned to Thornton Creek Elementary School (Novi), Hillside Middle School (Northville), and Northville High School (Northville Township).

The William K. Smith Community Center houses the Lyon Township Public Library.

== Post Office Service ==
The New Hudson Office, ZIP code 48165, serves an area in the north central part of the township.

- South Lyon Office, ZIP code 48178, serves much of the southern and western parts of the township.
- Northville Office, ZIP code 48167, serves areas in the southeast portion of the township.
- Wixom Office, ZIP code 48393, serves areas in the northeast portion of the township.
- Milford Office, ZIP code 48381, serves a narrow band along the northern part of the township.
