= Kensington, Michigan =

- Unincorporated community and former village
- Location within the state of Michigan
- Coordinates: 42°30′42″N 83°39′33″W
- Country: United States
- State: Michigan
- County: Oakland
- Townships: Lyon
- Settled: 1831
- Time zone: UTC-5 (EST)
  - Summer (DST): UTC-4 (EDT)
- ZIP code(s): 48178 (South Lyon)
- Area code: 248
- FIPS code: 26-84240
- GNIS feature ID: 1627218

Kensington is an unincorporated community and former village in Oakland County in the U.S. state of Michigan. It is located within Lyon Township.

Settled in 1831, Kensington suffered population loss when the railroad diverted the Detroit to Lansing traffic southward to South Lyon. The later building of I-96 and the Kensington Metropark in the 1950s caused the community to disappear.

== History ==
Kensington was settled in 1831 and platted in 1836. On June 9, 1834, a U.S. Post Office opened with the name of Lyon on Kent Lake Road between Grand River Avenue and Silver Lake Road (42°30′42″N 83°39′33″W). On September 5, 1836, the Lyon Post Office was renamed Kensington. By 1854 it had over 300 residents. With the building of the Detroit, Lansing and Lake Michigan Railroad in 1871 it suffered a significant loss of population that was further accelerated by the building of the Michigan Air Line Railroad in 1882 that went through New Hudson. On July 31, 1902, the Kensington Post Office was closed. By 1905 there were only four families left in the village. Most of its buildings were leveled when Kensington Metropark and I-96 (then US-16) were built in the 1950s.
