= Whitmore Lake Public Schools =

School district in Michigan

Coordinates: 42°24′51.2″N 83°45′42.9″W

Whitmore Lake Public Schools was established in the year 1944. The schools were located just outside downtown Whitmore Lake, Michigan. Originally, the High School, Middle School, and Elementary School were built on the same land. Due to a few different aspects, one of which being the growth in the population of students, the district had to rebuild the Elementary School in 1991 and later, the High School in 2006. Whitmore Lake Public Schools is currently a School of Choice, meaning that to attend school at Whitmore Lake, it is not necessary to live within the boundaries of Whitmore Lake Public School District.

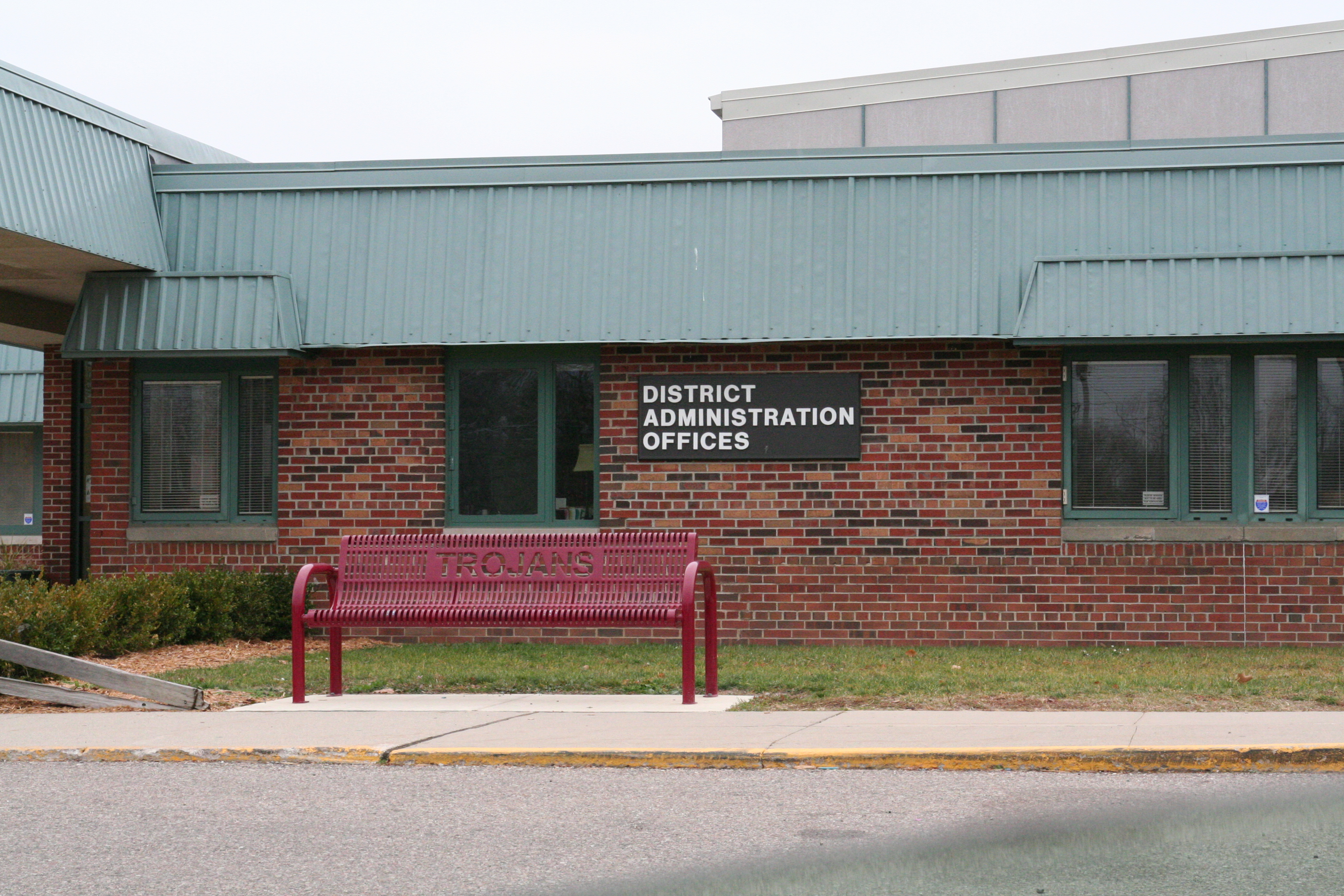
Whitmore Lake Public Schools Administration Offices

Administration
Name	Position
Tom DeKeyser	Superintendent
Denise Kerrigan	Director of Business & Operations
Dorene Fraley	Administrative Assistant
Carol Henry	Payroll & Benefits Coordinator
Maria Carter-Ewald	Communications Director

The Administrative offices are located at 8845 Main Street, Whitmore Lake.

== Primary School - Grades K-6 ==
Whitmore Lake Elementary School was built in 1944, later (1991) moved from 8847 Main Street to 1077 Barker Road. The Elementary School contains Kindergarten through sixth grade. In 2007, there were 451 students enrolled at Whitmore Lake Elementary School. The female enrollment was 228 (50.5%) students, while the male enrollment was 223 (49.5%) students. The Kindergarten enrollment was 106 students (23.5% of the Elementary population). The first grade enrollment was 93 students (20.6% of the population). The second grade enrollment was 86 students (19% of the population). The third grade enrollment was 85 students (18.8% of population). The fourth grade enrollment was 81 (17.9% of the population). In 2012 the elementary school was labeled as a focus school.

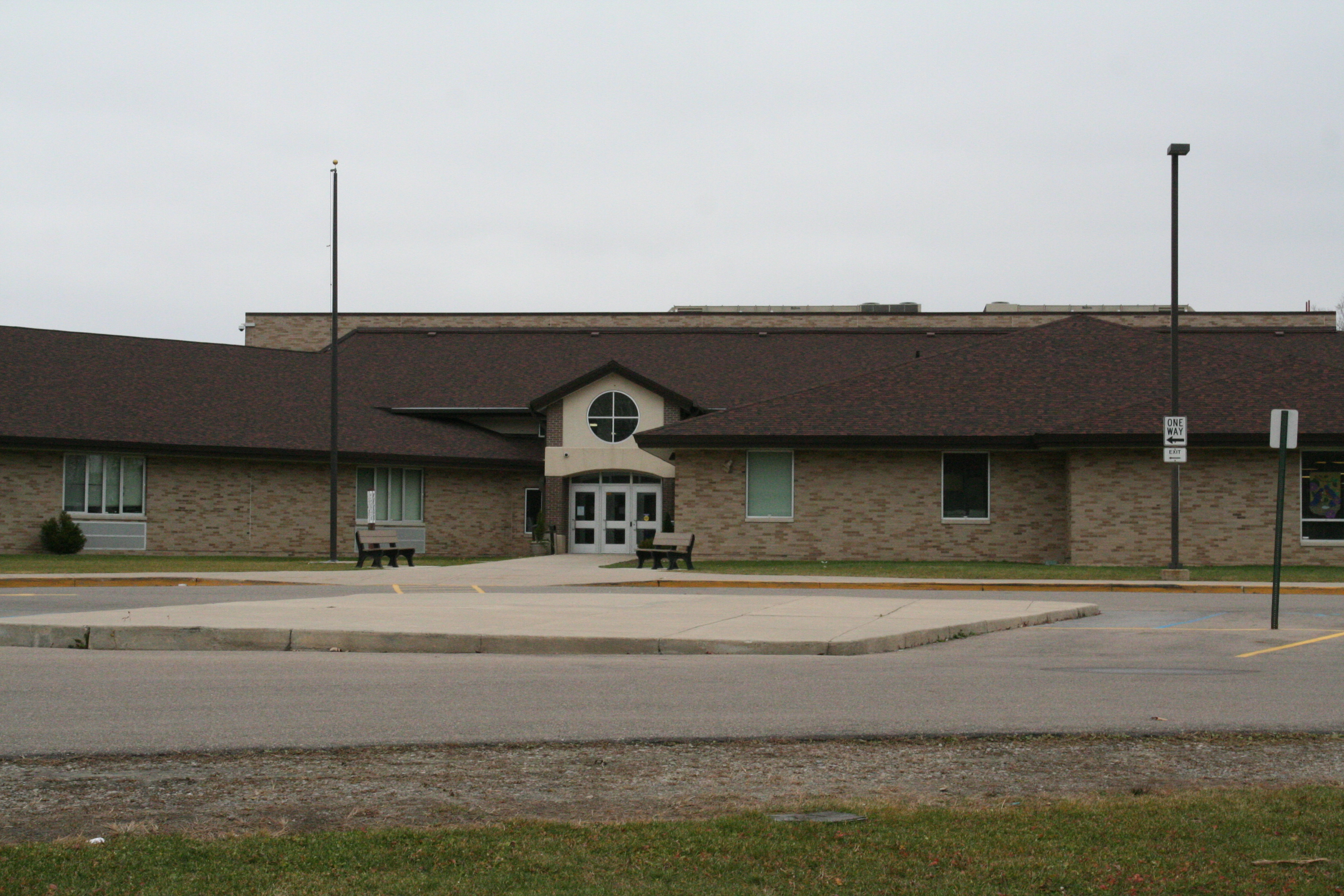
Whitmore Lake Elementary School

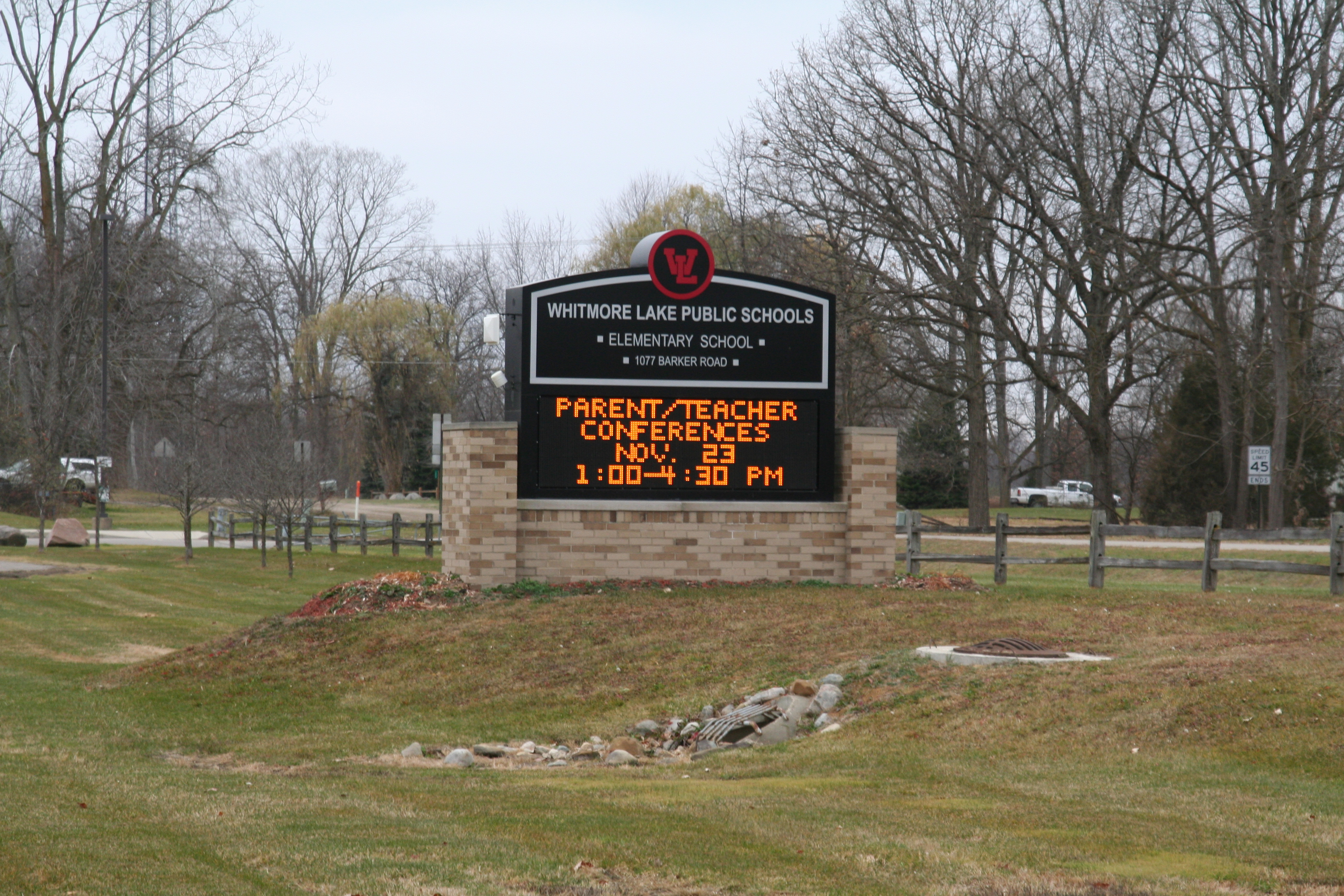
Whitmore Lake Elementary School (sign)

Administration
Name	Position
Heidi Roy-Borland	Elementary Principal
Samantha Fulkerson	Administrative Assistant

== Secondary School - Grades 7-12 ==
The first graduating class from Whitmore Lake High School was not until after 1950, due to the fact that there was not a high school built at the same time that the rest of the district was established. The new high school was completed in 2006, becoming the first "green" (environmentally friendly) building of the school district. The current high school is located at 7430 Whitmore Lake Road. The high school participates in a program called the Early College Alliance (ECA). In 2007, there were 417 students enrolled at the high school. 202 (48.4%) of these students were female. The male population was made up of 215 students (51.6%). The ninth grade consisted of 124 students (29.7% of students). The tenth grade contained 119 students (28.5% of students). The eleventh grade was made up of 84 students (20.1% of students). The twelfth grade included 90 students (21.6% of students).

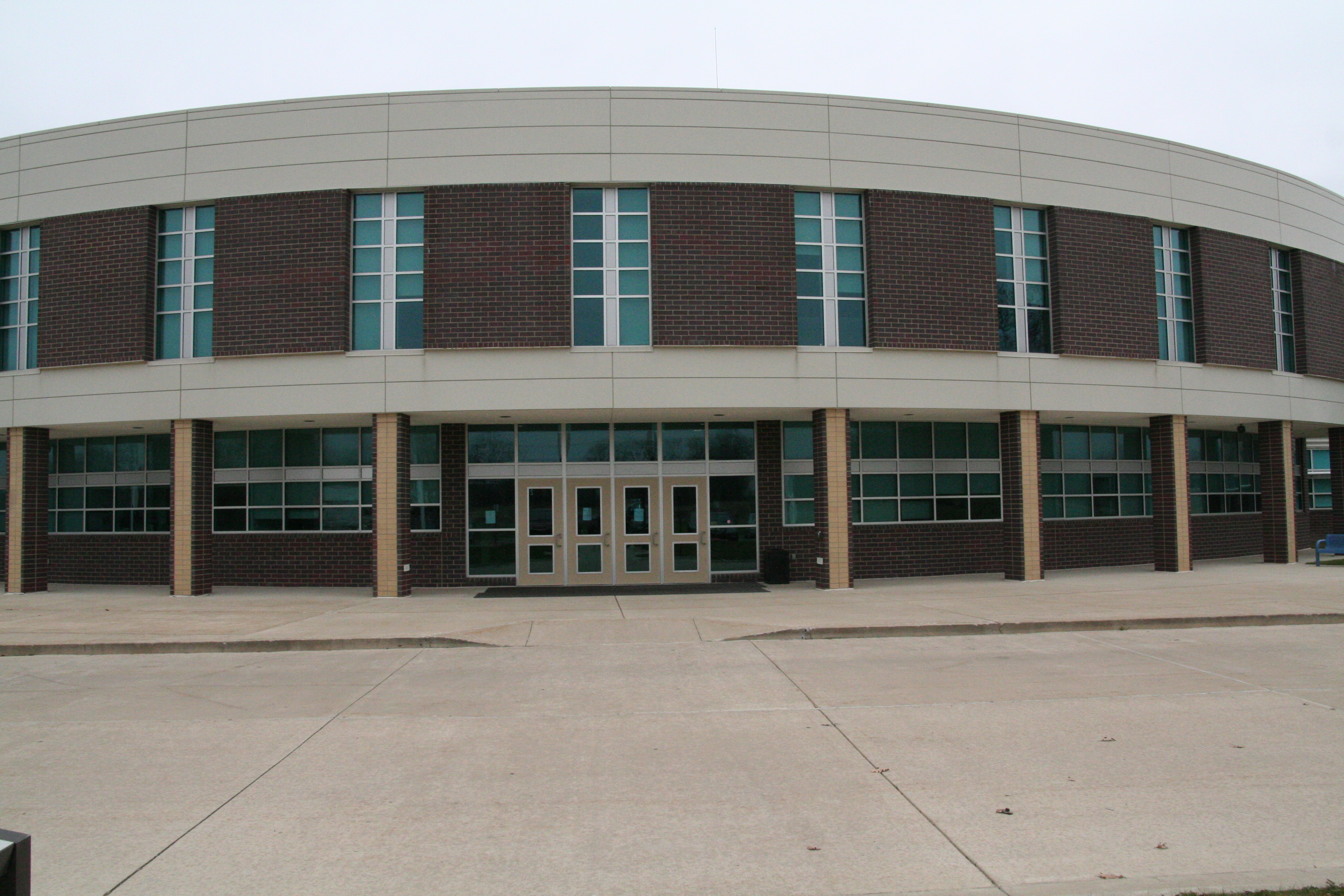
Whitmore Lake High School

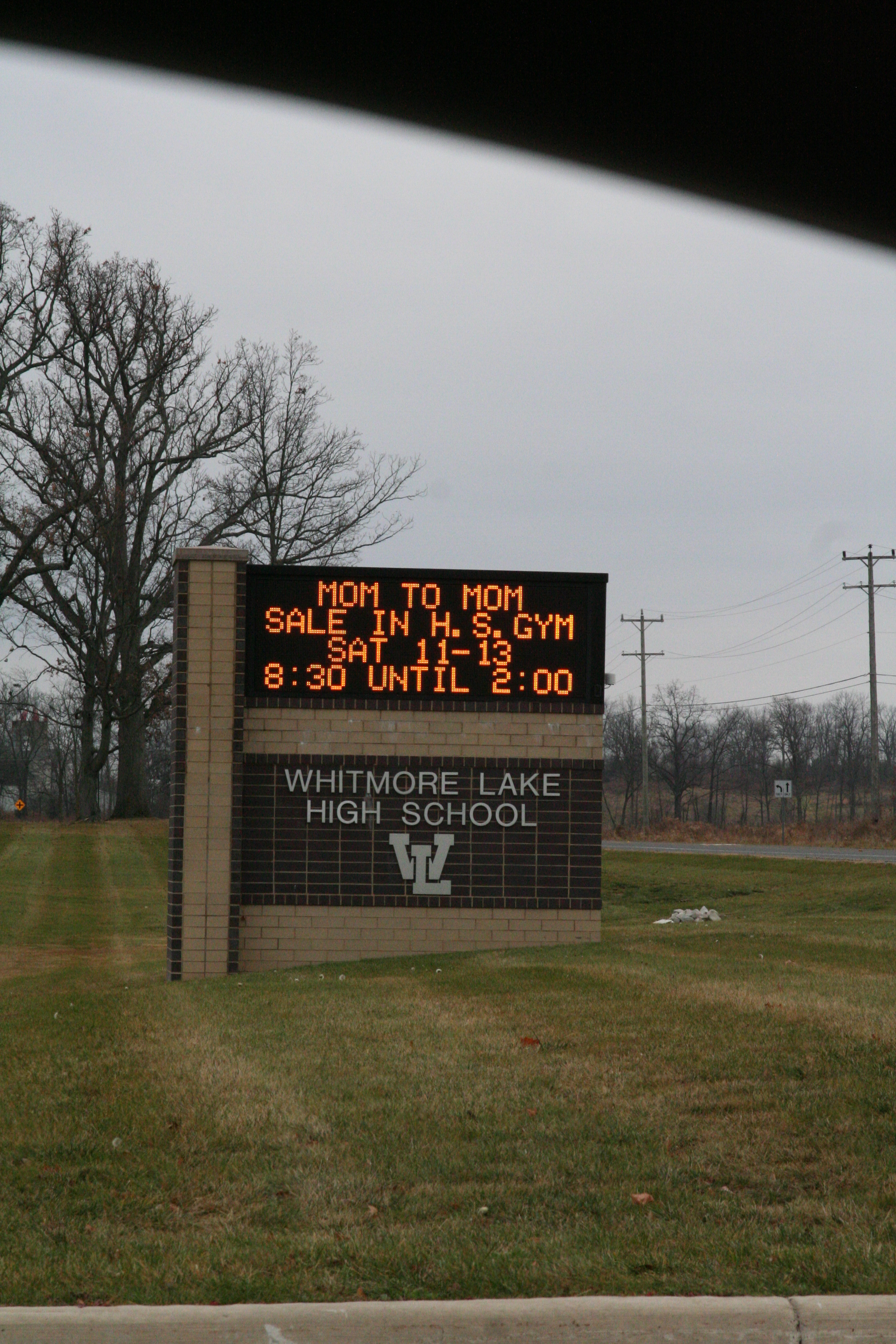
Whitmore Lake High School2 (sign)

Administration
Name	Position
Jill Henry	High School Principal
Brad McCormack	Athletic Director
Emily Wilson	Administrative Assistant

== Early Childhood Center ==
The Early Childhood Center is located next to the Administrative offices at 8845 Main Street. The Early Childhood Center at Whitmore Lake is an attempt to prepare students for success in their future academic lives. Early Childhood Center contains Early Childhood Special Education, First Steps Washtenaw, Head Start, Tuition Preschool, Great Start Readiness Preschool Program, Kids Club, and Kids Club Kindergarten Enrichment Daily Schedule.

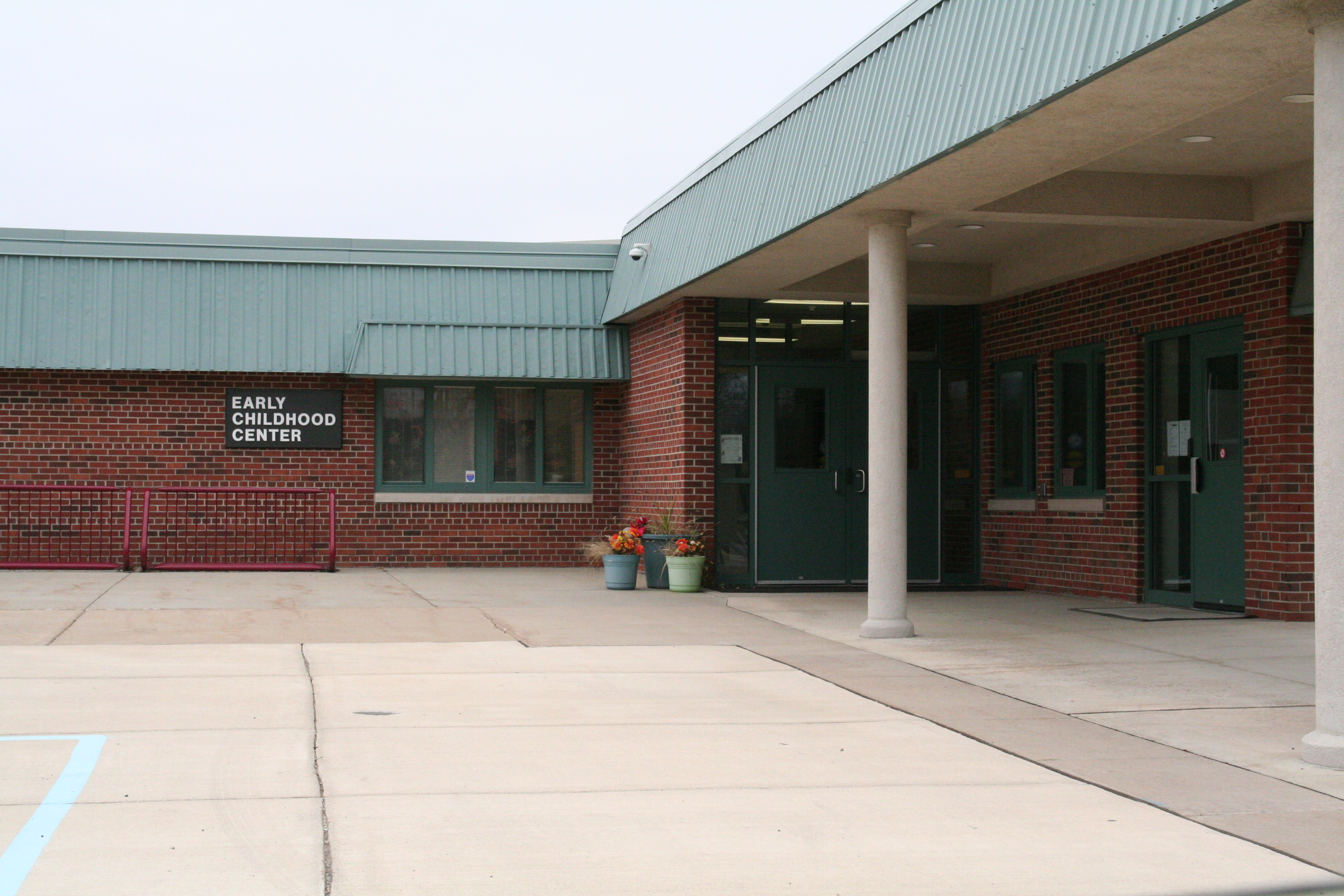
Whitmore Lake Early Childhood Center

Administration
Name	Position
Sue Wanamaker	ECC Director
Charlie Basham	Family Service Worker

== Community Relations & Recreation ==
Whitmore Lake Community Recreation hosts after school sports, swim lessons, exercise classes and open swim. The sports that Community Recreation is in charge of include: baseball, t-ball, softball, basketball, and soccer. The community pool is located in the South end of Whitmore Lake High School.

Staff
Name	Position
Ann Kehn	Aquatics & Recreation Director
Kevin LaMont	Athletics & Recreation Coordinator

== Board of education ==
Members
Name	Position
Michelle Kritzman	President
Frank Zolenski	Vice President
John Meadows Jr.	Treasurer
Lisa McCully	Secretary
Lee Cole	Trustee
Lindsey Collins	Trustee
Kelly Henning	Trustee
