= South Lyon East High School =

High school in South Lyon, Oakland County, Michigan

Location
- 52200 Ten Mile Road; South Lyon, Michigan 48178; United States; 42°27′54″N 83°33′56″W

Information
- Type: Public high school
- Superintendent: Steve Archibald
- Principal: Karen Fisher
- Teaching staff: 63.30 (FTE)
- Enrollment: 1,181 (2023–2024)
- Student to teacher ratio: 18.66
- Colors: Black; Silver
- Nickname: Cougars
- Website: www.slcs.us/south_lyon_east_high_school/index.php

Student assessments
- 2021–22 school year Change vs. prior year

M-STEP 11th grade proficiency rates (Science / Social Studies)
- Advanced %: 25.2 / 16.5
- Proficient %: 30.9 / 37.8
- PR. Proficient %: 12.9 / 38.1
- Not Proficient %: 30.9 / 7.6

Average test scores
- SAT Total: 1038.4 (▼ −19.5)

South Lyon East High School is an American public high school in Lyon Township, Michigan in Metro Detroit, near South Lyon. It is a part of South Lyon Community Schools and the Oakland Schools intermediate school district. It is accredited by North Central Association of Colleges and Schools.

The school was built to compensate for the overcrowding at South Lyon High School. It opened in September 2007. Since then, the school has attained a enrollment of a little over a thousand students. These students participate in a variety of clubs and extracurriculars, including band, choir, theater, NHS, Mock Trial, HOSA, Key Club, and others, in addition to East’s sports teams.

== Extracurricular activities ==
=== Athletics ===
South Lyon East is a member of the Lakes Valley Conference. Their nickname is the Cougars, and the school colors are black and silver. Numerous fall, winter, and spring sports are offered at South Lyon East, such as football, basketball, ski, and cheer. A full list is below.

=== Fall ===
- Men's Football
- Women's Basketball
- Men's Cross Country
- Women's Cross Country
- Women's Golf
- Women's Swimming and Diving
- Men's Soccer
- Women's Cheer
- Women's Pompon
- Men's Tennis
- Coed Equestrian
- Women's Volleyball
- Marching Band

=== Winter ===
- Men's Basketball
- Wrestling
- Men's Swimming and Diving (Combined w/ South Lyon High School)
- Women's Competitive Cheer
- Women's Competitive Pompon
- Men's Hockey (Combined w/ South Lyon High School)
- Men's Bowling
- Women's Bowling
- Ski (Unified w/ South Lyon High School)
- Men's cricket

=== Spring ===
- Men's Baseball
- Women's Softball
- Men's Track and Field
- Women's Track and Field
- Women's Soccer
- Men's Golf
- Women's Tennis
- Women's Lacrosse
- Men's Lacrosse
- Men's flag football
