= South Lyon High School =

High school in South Lyon, Michigan

Coordinates: 42.4733°N 83.6505°W

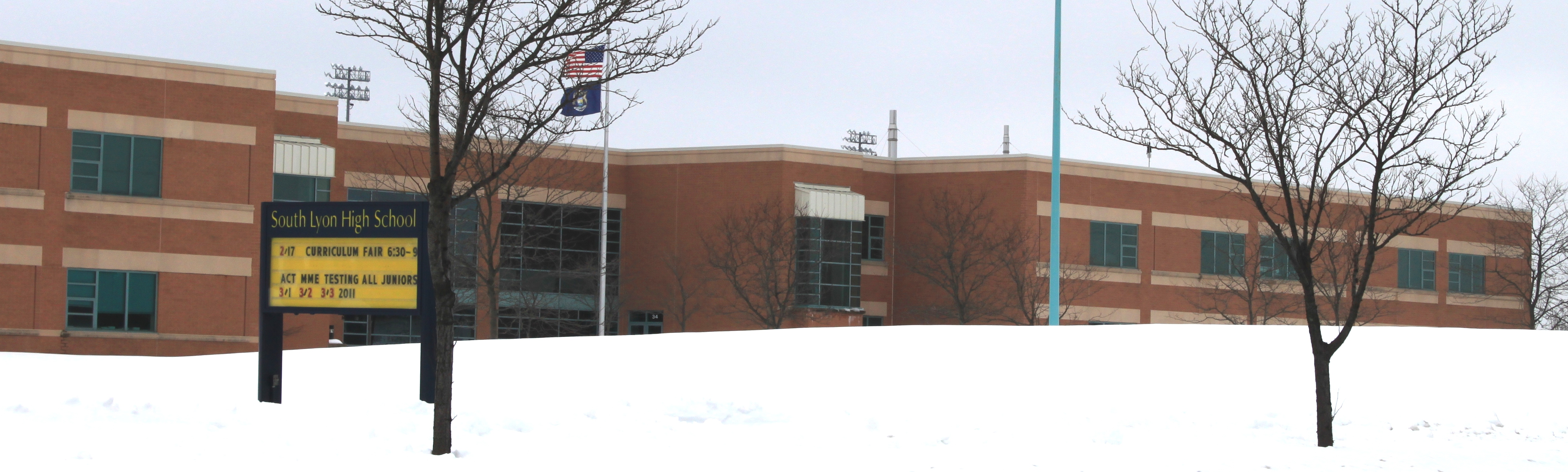

Information
- Type: Public high school
- Locale: Michigan, United States
- School district: South Lyon Community Schools
- Principal: Jim Brennan
- Teaching staff: 78.30 (FTE)
- Enrollment: 1,253 (2023-2024)
- Student to teacher ratio: 16.00
- Colors: Blue and gold
- Athletics conference: Lakes Valley Conference
- Mascot: Rory
- Team name: Lions
- Newspaper: The Lions' Roar
- Website: https://www.slcs.us/south_lyon_high_school/index.php

Student assessments
- 2021–22 school year Change vs. prior year

M-STEP 11th grade proficiency rates (Science / Social Studies)
- Advanced %: 26.0 / 17.5
- Proficient %: 36.4 / 37.7
- PR. Proficient %: 15.9 / 38.6
- Not Proficient %: 21.8 / 6.2

Average test scores
- SAT Total: 1039.0 (▼ −30.9)

South Lyon High School (SLHS) is a public high school located in South Lyon, Michigan, United States, and is part of South Lyon Community Schools. Its cross-town rival is South Lyon East High School.

== History ==
The South Lyon Union School District was formed in 1876. In 1915, South Lyon Union High School was constructed on the same site at Liberty and Warren. It served as the district school for many years and was later used as the school administration building until it was demolished in 1998. In 1955, a new high school was built for the district: Bartlett Elementary. Another new high school was established in 1969 (now Millennium Middle School). In 1990, South Lyon High School moved to its current location at 11 Mile and Pontiac Trail. In 1999, South Lyon High School received an addition that included 22 classrooms, an auxiliary gym, and a new wrestling room. Over the 2007 summer break, South Lyon High School underwent a major renovation including new flooring, new ceilings in the commons area, and more modern design features. Also in 2007, South Lyon East High School opened as a new, second high school. In 2015 SLHS renovated its football field and changed the name to honor former student Dominic Ciaramitaro, who lost his life while serving as a Marine in 2011. In 2017 SLHS built a new entrance after a mill bond was passed to upgrade 12 schools in the South Lyon School District. South Lyon's mascot is the Lion with the colors blue and gold. South Lyon High School also hosts the annual RED OUT, which raises money for the American Heart Association and has brought over $10,000 in some years.

== Memberships ==
- North Central Association
- Oakland Schools
- International Thespian Society

== Notable alumni ==
- Anita Cochran, country singer
- Danny Spanos, rock music artist
- John Heffron (1988), 2004 winner of reality TV series Last Comic Standing
- Dave Brandon, former CEO of Domino's Pizza and former athletic director at the University of Michigan
