= Salem Township, Washtenaw County, Michigan =

Salem Township, Michigan
- Civil township
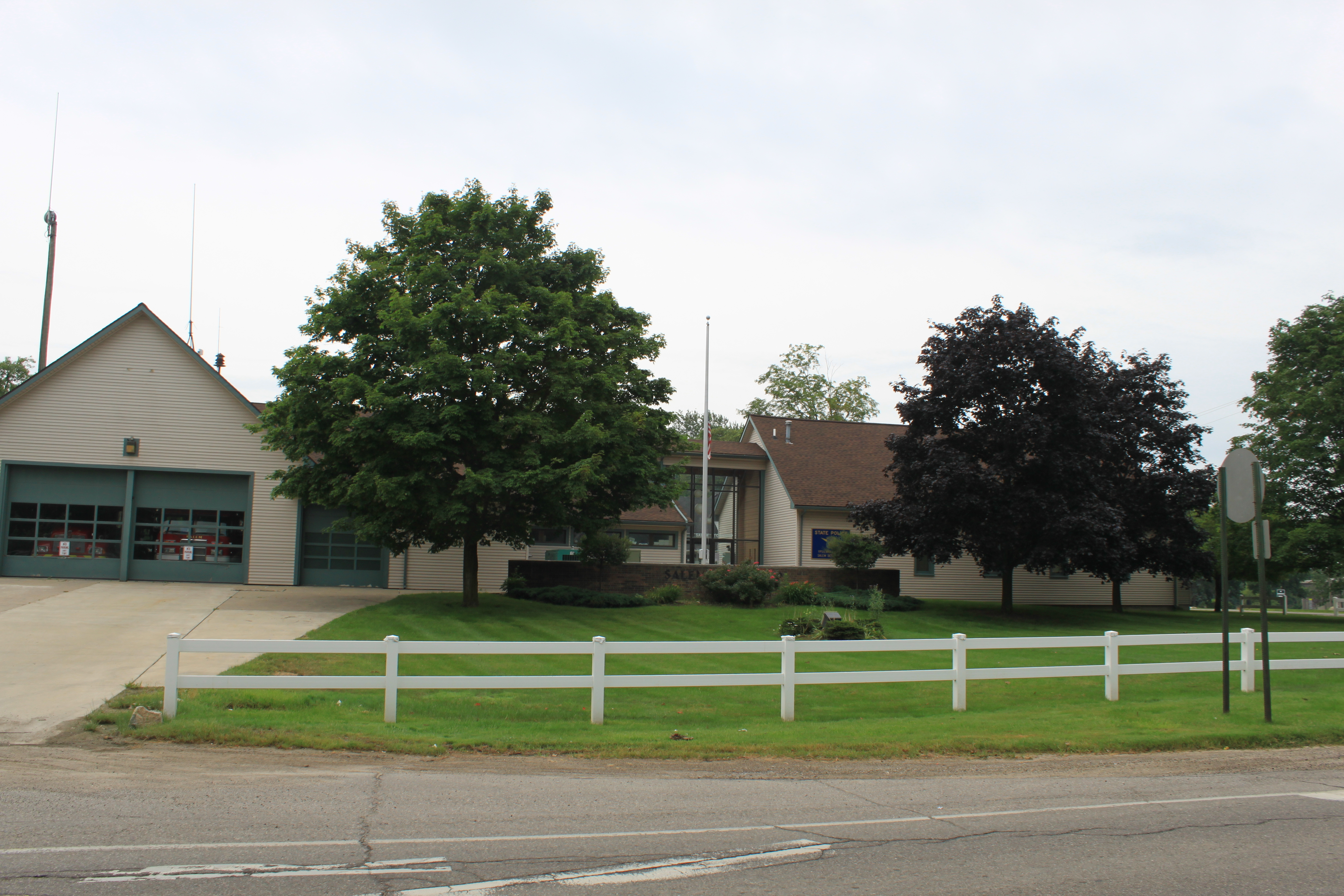
- Township Hall at Six Mile and Salem Road

- Seal

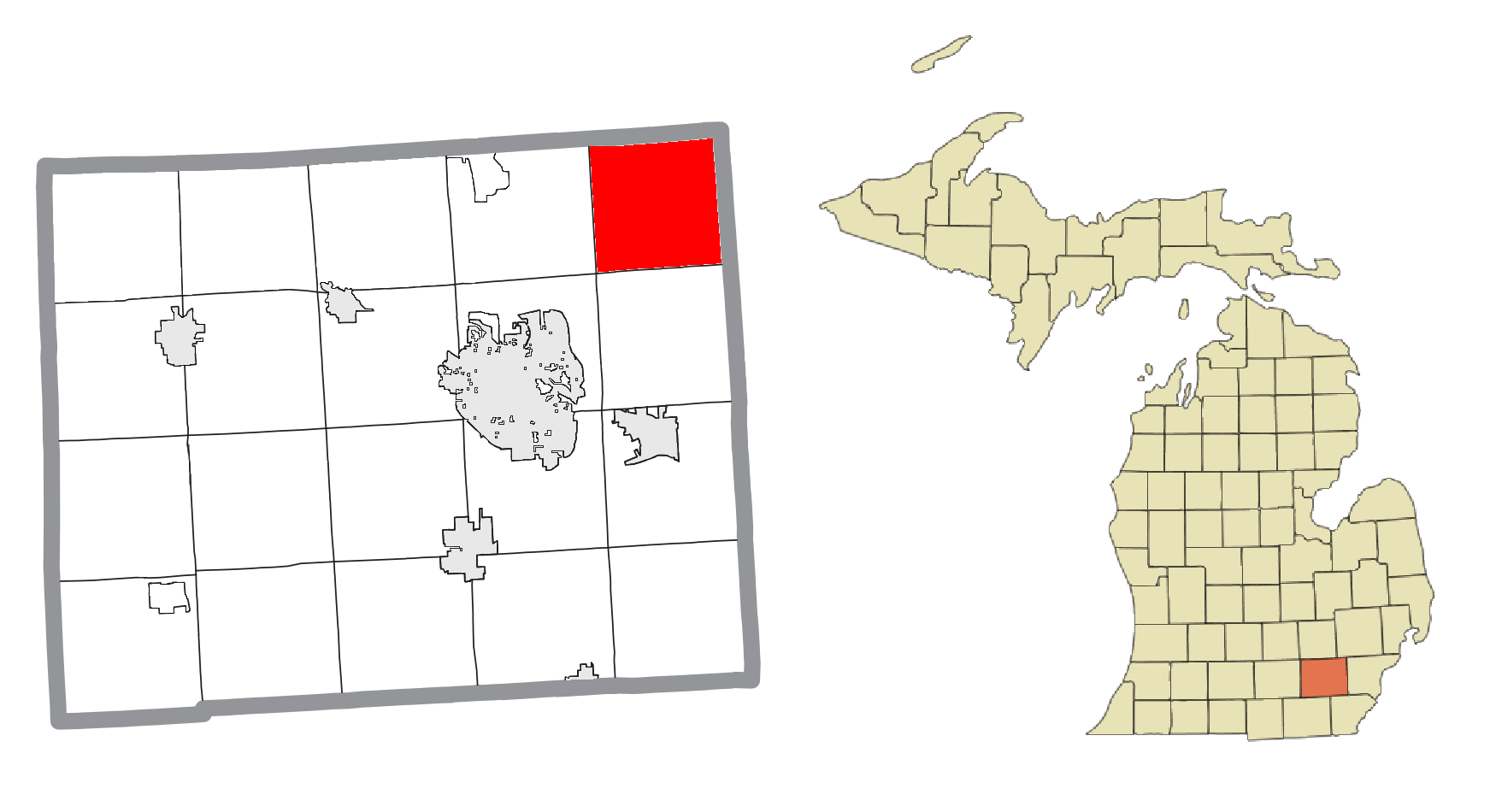
- Location within Washtenaw County

- Location within the state of Michigan Location within the United States
- Coordinates: 42°24′00″N 83°36′00″W
- Country: United States
- State: Michigan
- County: Washtenaw
- Established: 1832

Government
  - Supervisor: Gary Whittaker
  - Clerk: Del Wensley

Area
  - Total: 34.38 sq mi (89.04 km^{2})
  - Land: 34.29 sq mi (88.81 km^{2})
  - Water: 0.089 sq mi (0.23 km^{2})
- Elevation: 922 ft (281 m)

Population (2020)
  - Total: 7,018
  - Density: 204.7/sq mi (79.02/km^{2})
- Time zone: UTC-5 (Eastern (EST))
  - Summer (DST): UTC-4 (EDT)
- ZIP code(s): 48105 (Ann Arbor); 48167, 48168 (Northville); 48170 (Plymouth); 48175 (Salem); 48178 (South Lyon)
- Area codes: 248 and 734
- FIPS code: 26-71130
- GNIS feature ID: 1627035
- Website: Official website

Salem Township is a civil township of Washtenaw County in the U.S. state of Michigan. The population was 7,018 at the 2020 census.

== Communities ==
- Brookeville is an unincorporated community located within the township at 42°22′38″N 83°34′43″W.
- Salem is an unincorporated community located in the northeastern portion of the township at 42°24′22″N 83°34′48″W. It was first settled as early as 1825 when John and Joseph Dickinson moved to the area. A post office opened on June 4, 1831 under the name Rider's after its first postmaster Ira Rider. The post office was renamed Renwick on May 29, 1841 after postmaster George Renwick. The office was renamed Salem after the township on January 28, 1846 and operated until December 10, 1875. The Summit post office was transferred to Salem on December 15, 1876 and has remained active under the name Salem ever since.
- Summit is a former settlement that began with a post office on May 1, 1833 as a stopover between Ann Arbor and Pontiac. The post office was closed and transferred to Salem on December 15, 1876.
- Worden is an unincorporated community located within the township at 42°23′16″N 83°38′42″W. The community was settled by the Pebbles family who moved to Salem Township in 1831. It was given a stage post office named Pebbles Corner in 1838. The post office was renamed as Worden on March 7, 1882. It became a station along the Toledo, Ann Arbor & Northern Michigan Railroad. The Worden post office operated until January 31, 1902.

== Geography ==
According to the U.S. Census Bureau, the township has a total area of 34.38 square miles (89.04 km^{2}), of which 34.29 square miles (88.81 km^{2}) is land and 0.09 square miles (0.23 km^{2}) (0.26%) is water.

=== Major highways ===
- M-14 runs briefly through the southeast corner of the township.

== Demographics ==
At the 2000 census, there were 5,562 people, 1,928 households and 1,615 families residing in the township. The population density was 162.2 inhabitants per square mile (62.6/km^{2}). There were 2,031 housing units at an average density of 59.2 per square mile (22.9/km^{2}). The racial makeup of the township was 95.97% White, 1.33% African American, 0.18% Native American, 0.68% Asian, 0.36% from other races, and 1.47% from two or more races. Hispanic or Latino of any race were 1.13% of the population.

There were 1,928 households, of which 38.2% had children under the age of 18 living with them, 72.6% were married couples living together, 7.7% had a female householder with no husband present, and 16.2% were non-families. 12.8% of all households were made up of individuals, and 3.3% had someone living alone who was 65 years of age or older. The average household size was 2.88 and the average family size was 3.13.

27.0% of the population were under the age of 18, 6.7% from 18 to 24, 29.1% from 25 to 44, 28.2% from 45 to 64, and 8.9% who were 65 years of age or older. The median age was 38 years. For every 100 females, there were 102.2 males. For every 100 females age 18 and over, there were 100.9 males.

The median household income was $69,258 and the median family income was $75,115. Males had a median income of $50,813 compared with $31,729 for females. The per capita income for the township was $29,450. About 0.8% of families and 2.2% of the population were below the poverty line, including 3.5% of those under age 18 and none of those age 65 or over.

== Education ==
The Jarvis Stone School is a defunct one-room schoolhouse that was built in the township in 1857.

Salem Township is served by four separate public school districts. South Lyon Community Schools serves the largest area of the township and is located in South Lyon to the north in Oakland County. The district's Salem Elementary School is the only public school located within Salem Township.

Northville Public Schools serves a very small northeastern portion of the township. Students within the Northville section of the township are zoned to attend either Ridgewood Elementary School or Thorton Creek Elementary School, as well as Hillside Middle School and Northville High School. Plymouth-Canton Community Schools to the east in Wayne County serves the southeast portion of the township. Ann Arbor Public Schools serves a very small southwest portion of the township, and students in that area are zoned to Logan Elementary School, Clague Middle School, and Huron High School.

== Notable people ==
- Melbourne H. Ford- Michigan Congressman was at Salem in 1849.
- Barbara Lewis, singer, "Baby I'm Yours", was born in Salem.

== Images ==
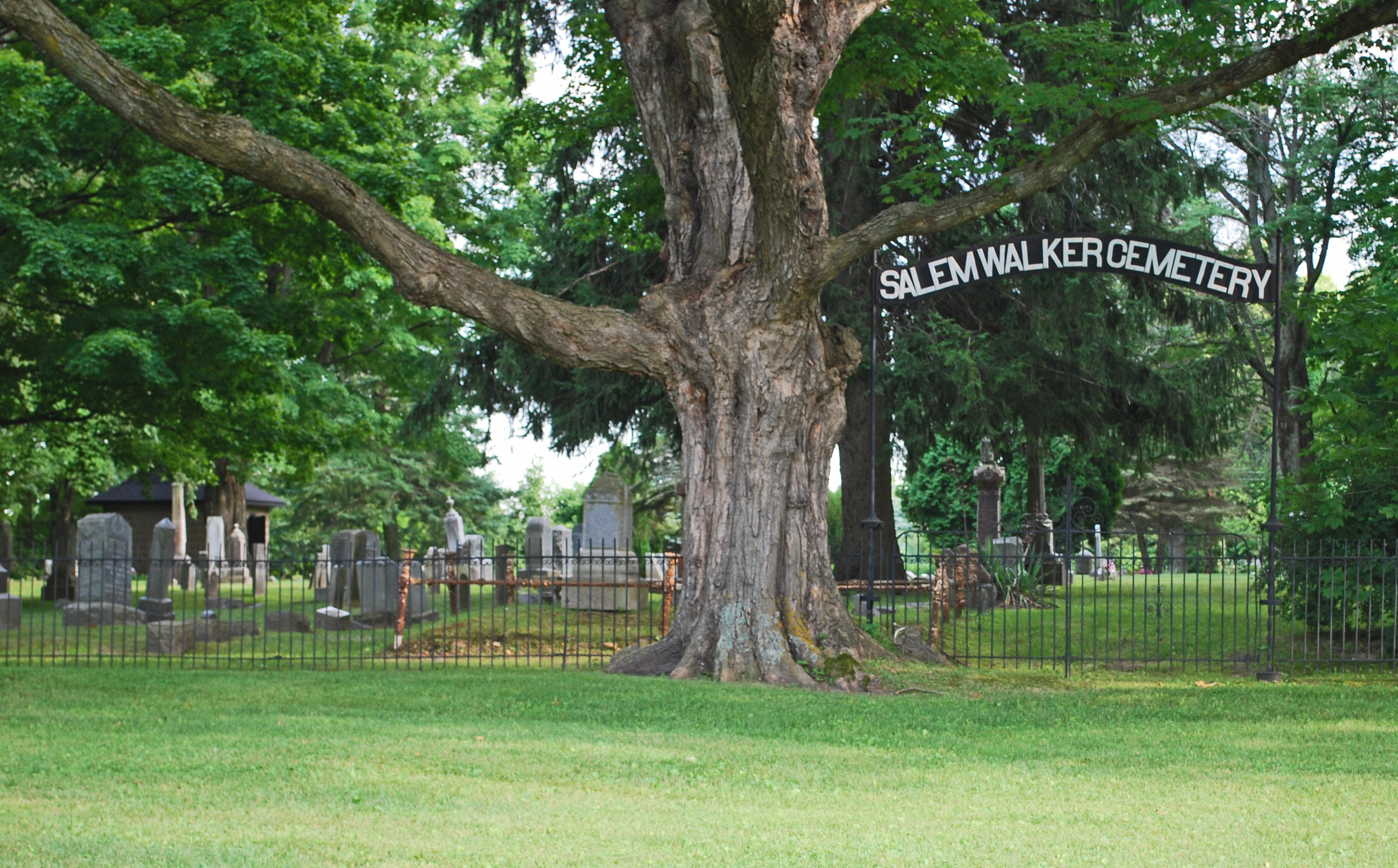
Salem Walker Cemetery

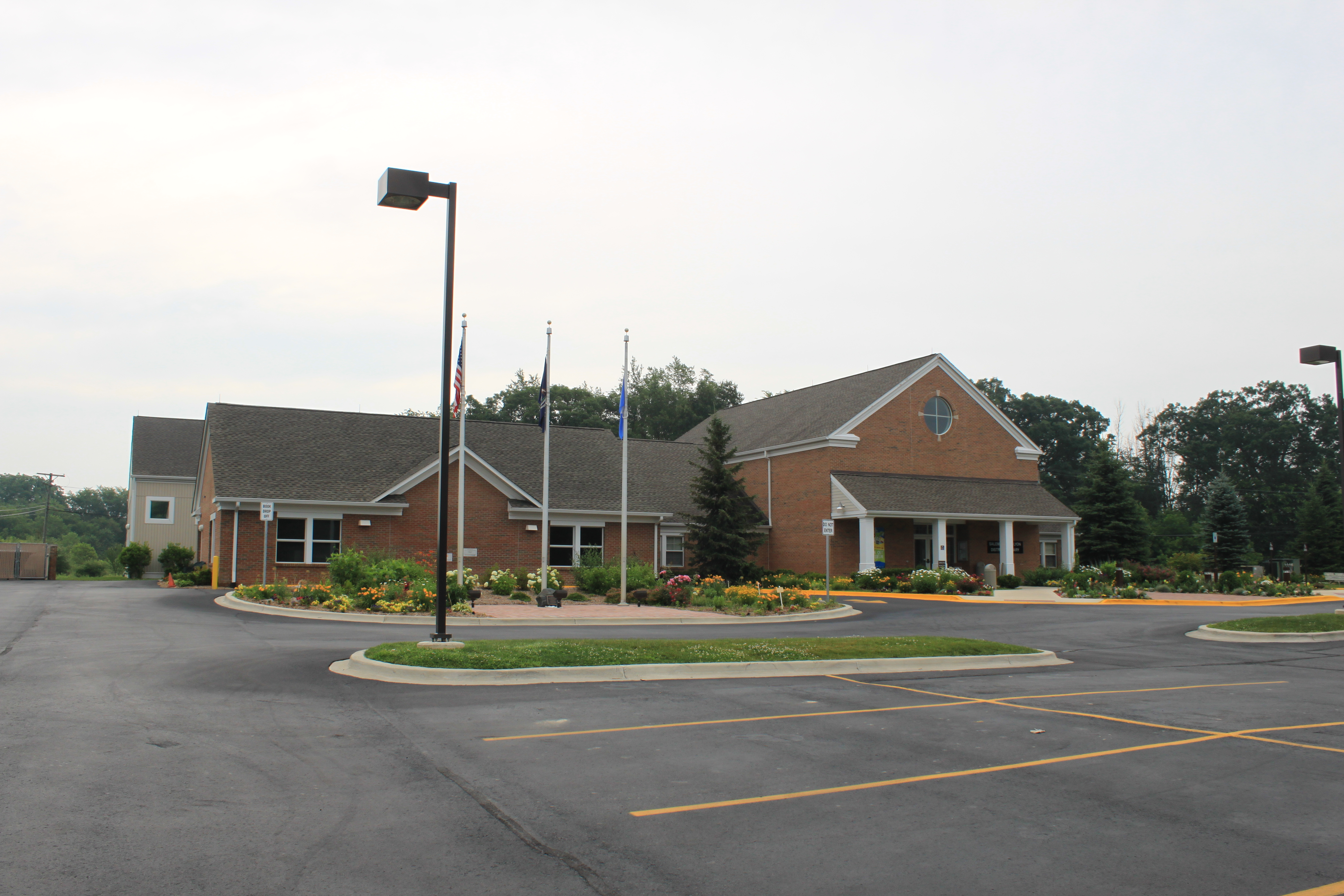
District library in Salem Township

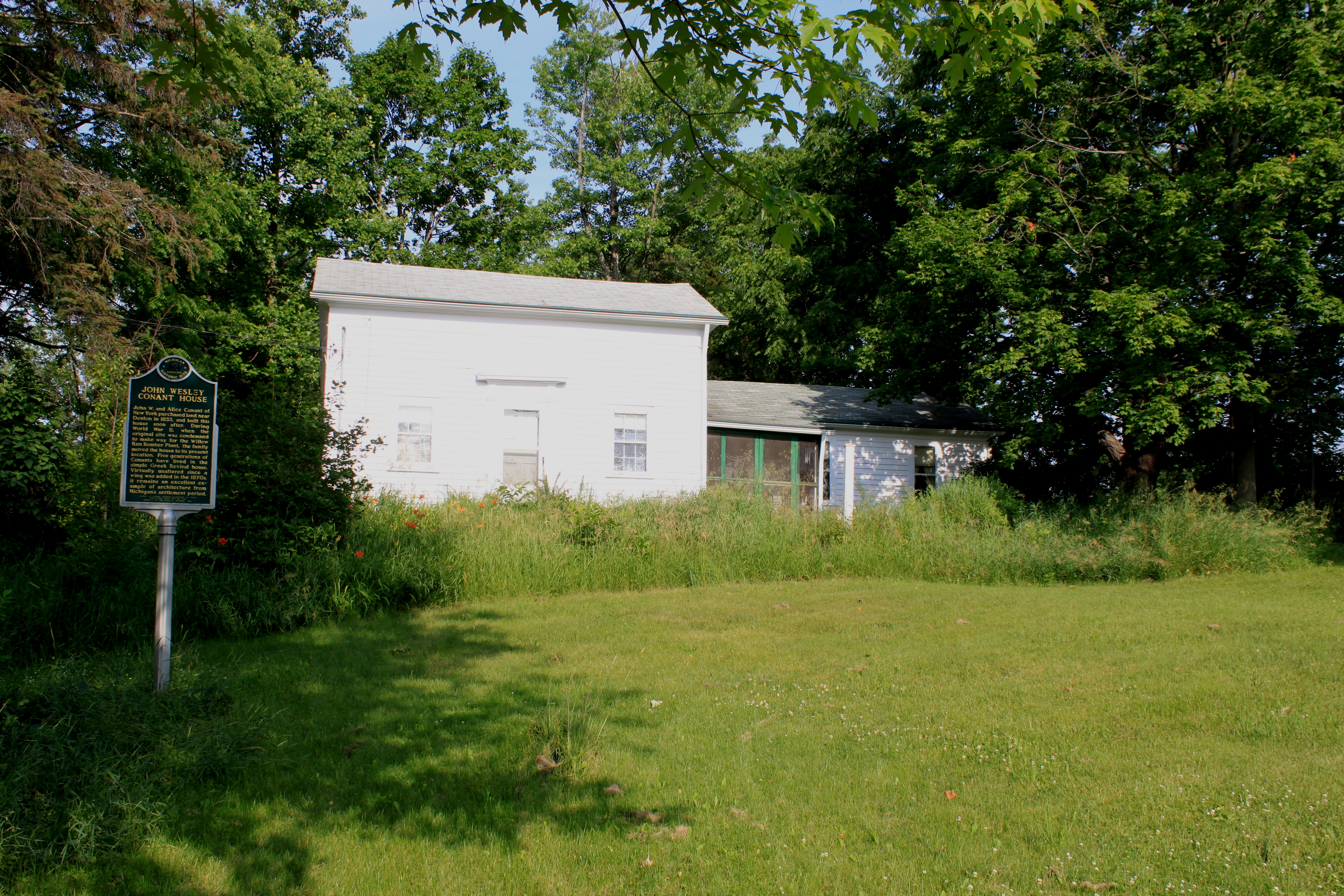
John Wesley Conant House

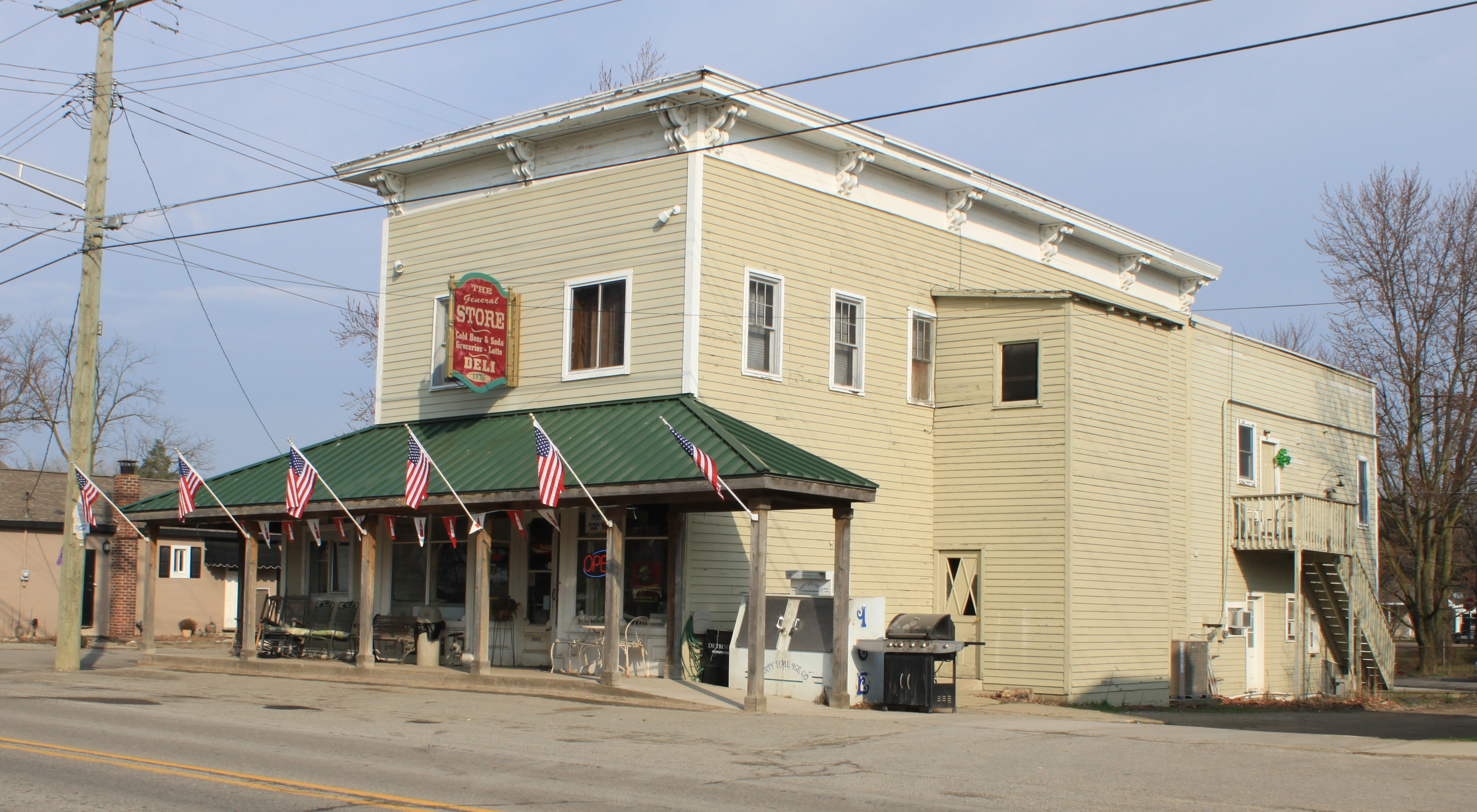
Salem General Store (1876)
