= South Lyon Community Schools =

School district in Michigan, United States

Address
- 345 S. Warren South Lyon, Oakland, Michigan, 48178; United States

District information
- Type: Public
- Grades: PreK–12
- Established: July 1947
- Superintendent: Steven Archibald
- Schools: 13
- Budget: $148,374,000 operating expenditures 2022-2023
- NCES District ID: 2632250

Students and staff
- Students: 8,387 (2024–2025)
- Teachers: 485.23 (on an FTE basis) (2024-2025)
- Staff: 972.38 (on an FTE basis) (2024-2025)
- Student–teacher ratio: 17.28 (2024-2025)

Other information
- Website: www.slcs.us

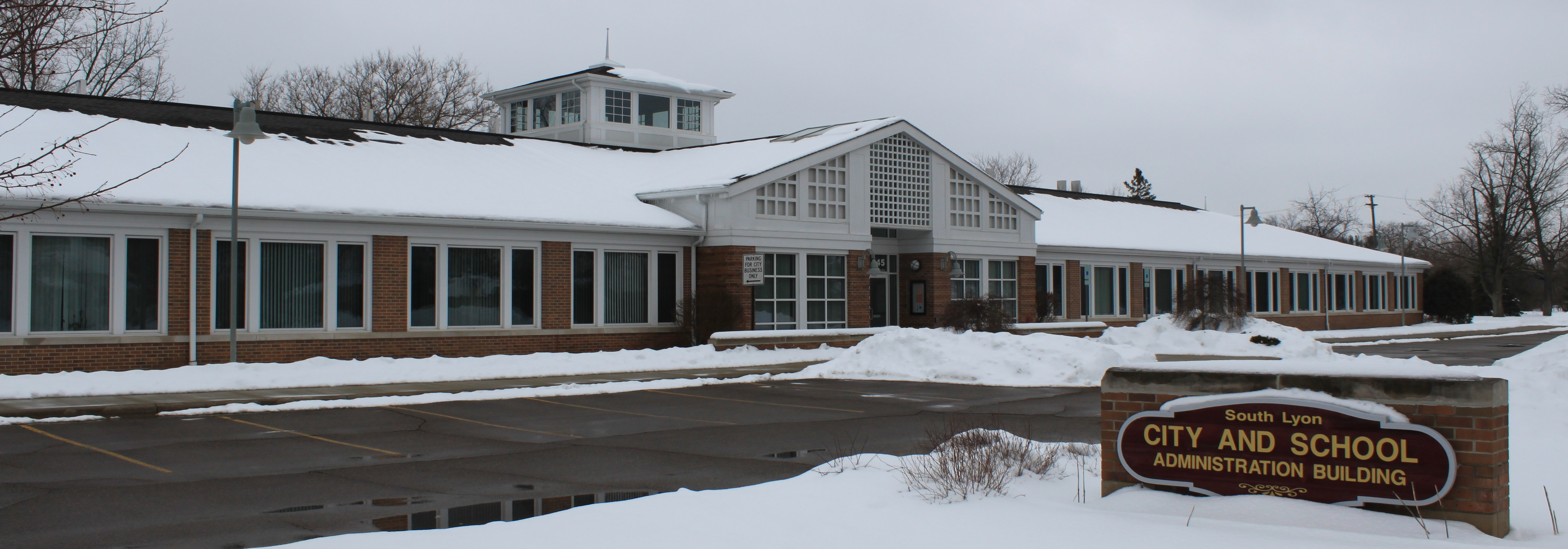
South Lyon City and School Administration Building

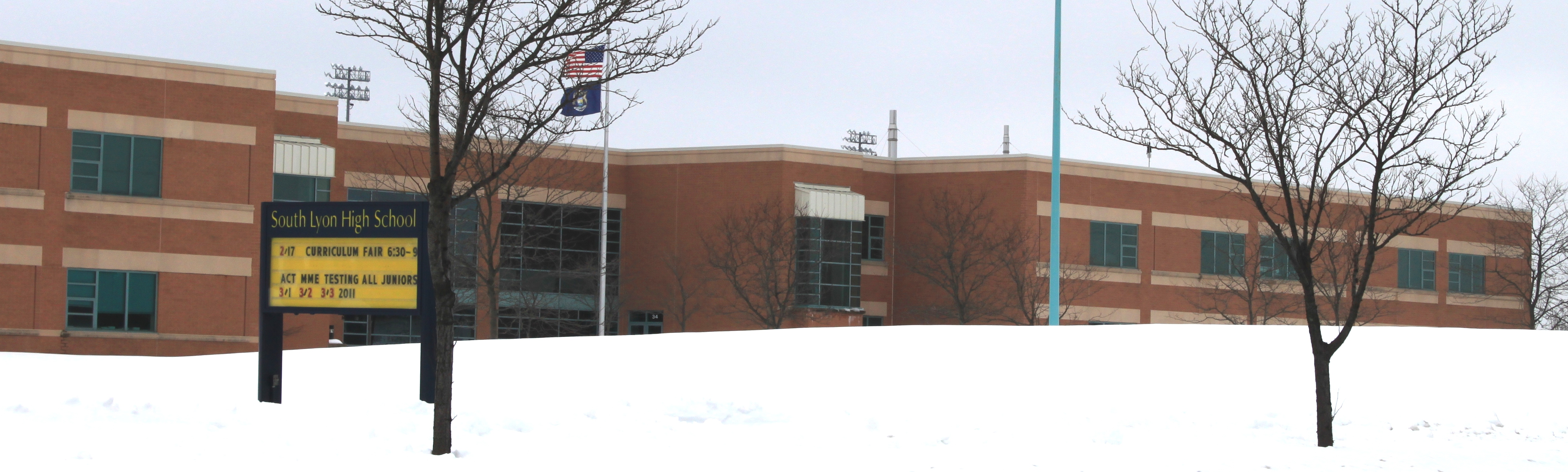
South Lyon High School

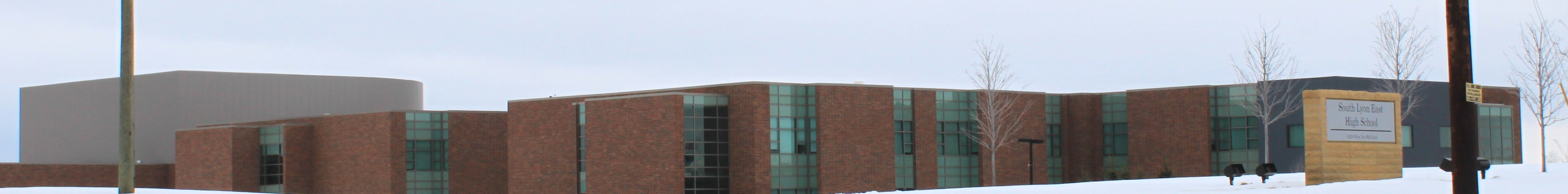
South Lyon East High School

South Lyon Community Schools is a public school district serving South Lyon, Michigan in the Metro Detroit area. In Oakland County the district includes all of South Lyon, most of Lyon Charter Township, and sections of Milford Charter Township, Novi, and Wixom. In Washtenaw County the district includes sections of Northfield Township and Salem Township. In Livingston County the district includes sections of Green Oak Township and Whitmore Lake.

== History ==
A Union school district was created in South Lyon in 1876. Beginning in July 1946, the district (then known as Lyon Township School District) consolidated with neighboring school districts such as New Hudson. In 1966, the Wash-Oak school district consolidated with the Lyon Township district, forming the present 83 square-mile district.

On the corner of Liberty and Warren Streets, a two-story school was built in 1915 and served as the high school until 1955. The building was torn down in 1998 and is now the site of a shared city/school administration building.

Bartlett Elementary was built as South Lyon High School in 1955.

In fall 1968, Millennium Middle School opened as a new and larger South Lyon High School building. The architect was O'Dell, Hewlett and Luckenbach. It became a middle school when the present high school opened.

The current South Lyon High School opened in fall 1990. The architecture firm was Hastings & Chevetta.

South Lyon East High School opened in fall 2007. The architect was Integrated Design Solutions.

== Schools ==
Schools in South Lyon Community Schools district
School	Address	Notes
South Lyon High School	1000 N. Lafayette, South Lyon	Grades 9-12. Built 1990.
South Lyon East High School	52200 W. Ten Mile Road, South Lyon	Grades 9-12. Built 2007.
Millennium Middle School	61526 West Nine Mile Road, South Lyon	Grades 6-8.
Centennial Middle School	62500 West Nine Mile Road, South Lyon	Grades 6-8. Built 1976.
Salem Elementary	7806 Salem Road, Salem	Grades K-5
Sayre Elementary	23000 Valerie Street, South Lyon	Grades K-5. Built 1961.
Bartlett Elementary	350 School Street, South Lyon	Grades K-5. Built 1955.
Dolsen Elementary	56775 Rice Street, New Hudson	Grades K-5.
Hardy Elementary	24650 Collingwood, South Lyon	Grades K-5. Built 2004.
Kent Lake Elementary	30181 Kent Lake Road, South Lyon	Grades K-5. Built 2001.
Brummer Elementary	9919 North Rushton Road, South Lyon	Grades K-5. Built 2000.
Pearson Elementary	57900 Eleven Mile Road, South Lyon	Grades K-5. Built 2017.
Early Childhood Center	310 N. Warren, South Lyon	Preschool. Built 2001.
