= Jarvis Stone School =

Historic one-room schoolhouse in Salem, Michigan, US

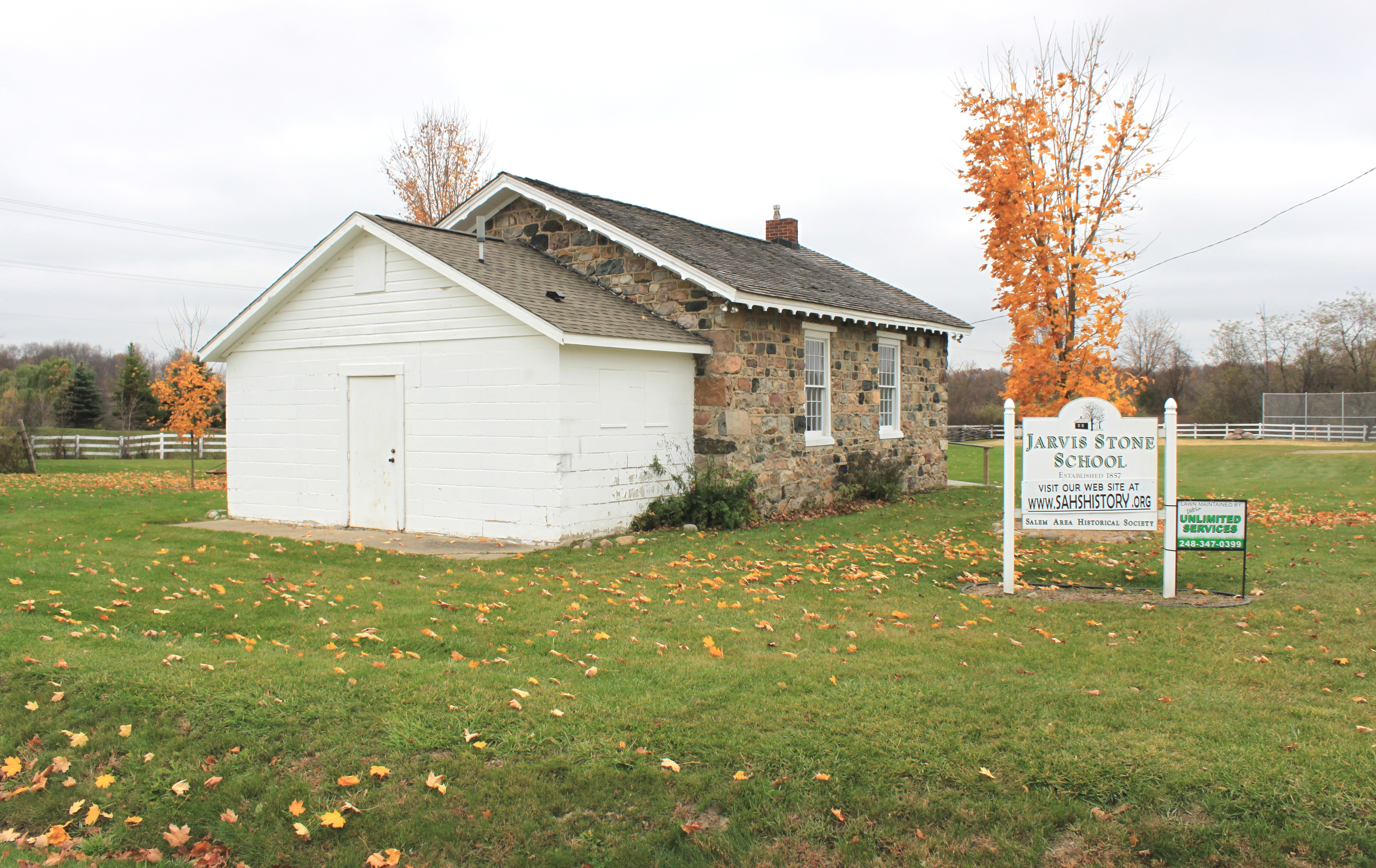
- Type: Historic One-room Schoolhouse
- Location: 7991 N Territorial Road, Salem, Michigan, U.S.

History
- Built: 1857

Site notes
- Website: www.washtenaw.org/Facilities/Facility/Details/Jarvis-Stone-School-58

The Jarvis Stone School, alternately known as the South Salem Stone School, is a defunct school in Salem Township, Washtenaw County, Michigan, built in 1857, and restored in the years leading up to 2007.

== History ==
When the Jarvis Stone School was built in 1857, it replaced the unhewn log constructed Bullock's Corners Schoolhouse which stood on the opposite corner since 1829. Both of these schools were very much in the tradition of the common school movement of the 19th century which began around 1830 and was legislated closer to 1870. This new school was named in honor of schoolboard member William Jarvis. During the school's history, it has also been known as Salem Stone School and South Salem Stone School, especially in the years immediately following when the Jarvis family moved away from Salem Twp.

The student population of the Jarvis Stone School ranged from 20 to more than 30. In its earliest years, the school year consisted of a 3 to 4 month winter term taught by a man and a 5-month summer session taught by a woman. Initially, salaries for the teacher's ranged from 0 to $10 weekly.

The following is taken from the School Register and appears on the Salem Area Historical Area website. It also includes a sampling of the teacher salaries from 1866 to 1962:

- 1866 Carrie Thayer- $28 per month- Tenure 13 weeks
- 1866 George P. Vorhies - $40 per month - Tenure - 16 weeks
- 1926-7 James Spencer - $140 per month - Tenure - 2 years
- 1933-4 Felice Beitel - $45 per month - Tenure - 2 years
- 1939-42 Ruth DeVine - $81 to $117 per month - Tenure - 4 years
- 1949-54 Esther French - $249 to $269 per month - Tenure - 6 years
- 1960-2 Roberta Scheidler - $363 per month - Tenure - 3 years

A typical day in the Jarvis-StoneSchool around 1900 was as follows with the numbers representing the grade level:

- 9:00 - 9:10 Opening Exercise
- 9:10 - 9:20 Beginner's Reading
- 9:20 - 9:30 1 Reading
- 9:30 - 9:40 2 Reading
- 9:40 - 9:50 3 Reading
- 9:50 - 10:00 4 Reading
- 10:20 - 10:30 7-8 Literature
- 10:30 - 10:45 Recess
- 10:45 - 10:55 Beginner's Reading
- 10:55 - 11:05 1/2 Reading
- 11:05 - 11:15 3 Spelling
- 11:15 - 11:25 4 Spelling
- 11:25 - 11:35 5 Spelling
- 11:35 - 12:00 7-8 Spelling
- 12:00 - 1:00 Noon Lunch and Recess
- 1:00 - 1:10 Beginner's Reading
- 1:10 - 1:20 1 Reading
- 1:20 - 1:30 2 Reading
- 1:30 - 1:40 3 Arithmetic
- 1:40 - 1:50 4 Arithmetic
- 1:50 - 2:00 5 Arithmetic
- 2:00 - 2:15 7 Arithmetic
- 2:15 - 2:30 8 Arithmetic
- 2:30 - 2:45 Recess
- 2:45 - 2:55 4 Geography
- 2:55 - 3:05 5 Geography
- 3:05 - 3:30 7-8 Geography
- 3:30 - 4:00 History

Long-time Salem Township Resident, Norma Schmeman (Feb. 23, 1914-Feb. 16, 2012), attended Jarvis School beginning in 1919. Her father had gone there before her. Her words, published in 2008, give a good sense of what some of school life was like:

"We had to take our own lunch to school. One of my most memorable experiences was when I said something to my mother about the same old lunch. My mother’s reply was for me to make lunch for myself. Slow to rise in the morning, I had to hurry to arrive at school on time. Forgetting my lunch in the cart in the schoolyard, I went out at noon to find that my pony had eaten it!
“PTA meetings were held at parents’ homes, and kids went along too. Dad would hitch up a team of horses to a sleigh and pick up people on the way. Kids also hitched their sleds to the sleigh and got a ride; the horse team proved to be the most reliable form of transportation. There was oyster stew waiting when we arrived—it tasted so good. When the meeting was over, they would roll up the rugs and square dance."

The Plymouth-Canton Community School District closed the Jarvis Stone School in 1967 and the building fell into ruin over the next ten years. In 1977, local resident Mrs. Irene Lyke worked in tandem with the school board to have the title transferred into the hands of the Salem Area Historical Society (SAHS). This dream was fulfilled in 1978. The next several years were dedicated to fundraising to acquire the property on which the building stood and to cover the costs of restoration.

== Building and grounds ==
The school is constructed primarily of local fieldstone. The original blackboards were made of painted wood. Originally, there was a small wood entrance. It was replaced in 1941 with the larger brick entrance which remains today. This new entrance featured Kaustine septic toilets which replaced the outhouse out back. The wide board in the back which served as a place for hooks for coats and such was replaced by hooks in the new entrance. The inside of the schoolhouse, though it was in near ruins for a long time, has been restored to something fairly representative of what it might have looked like for most of its history. Also, the space used to be heated by a box stove which sat on a brick foundation in the center of the room. This stove is no longer there. Prior to the 1930s, there was no electricity in the schoolhouse.

== Renovation project ==
In 1995, restoration began under the guidance of the then president of the SAHS, Don Riddering. Particulars of the Restoration Project have included removing and replacing the wood floor, heating ducts and electrical wiring, and adding some new interior walls, a new ceiling, windows and roof. The renovation project was concluded in 1999.

== See also ==
- One-room school
