= John Heffron =

American stand-up comic (born 1970)

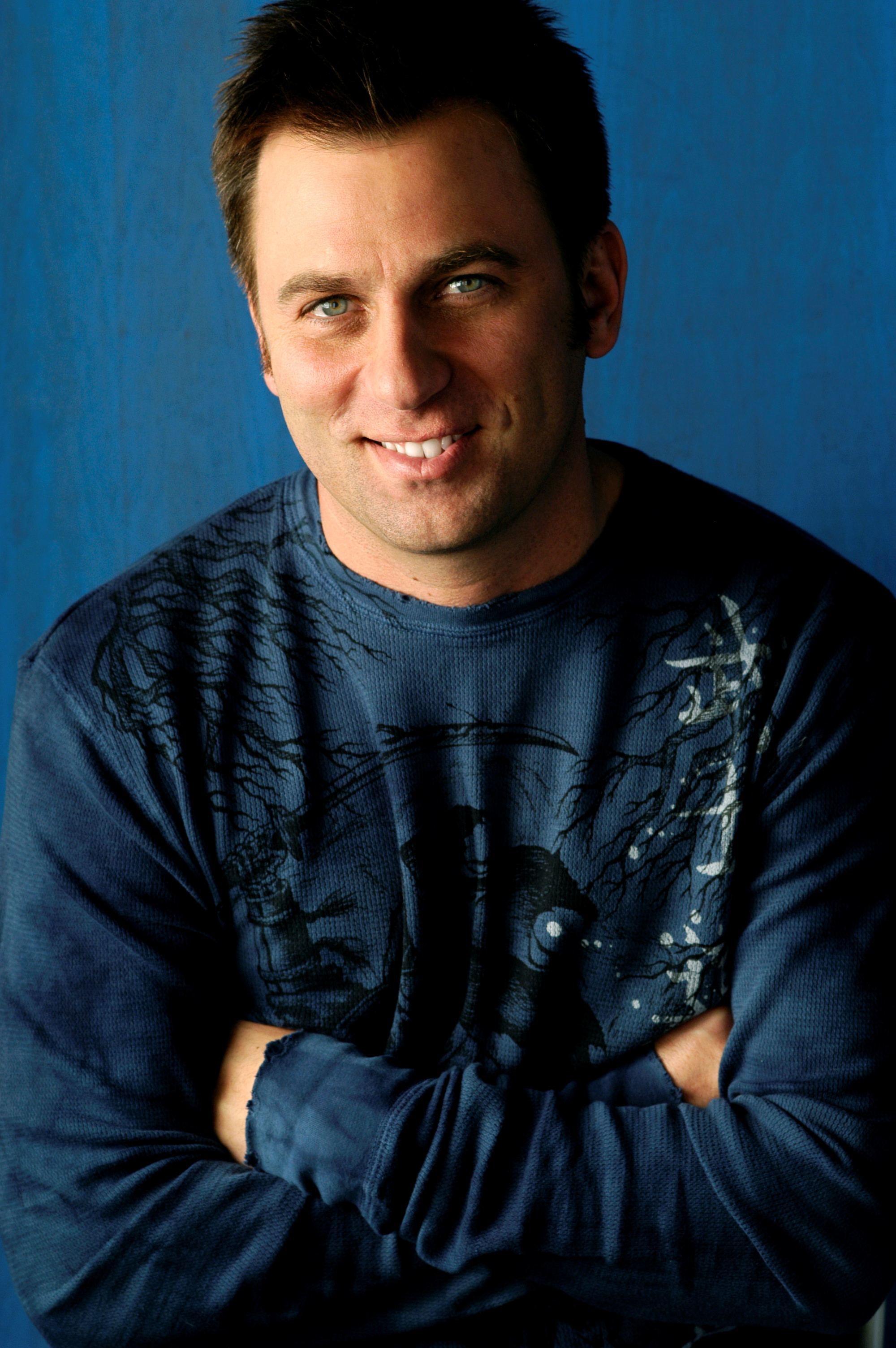
- Born: July 19, 1970 (age 54); New York City, U.S.
- Education: South Lyon High School; Eastern Michigan University
- Occupation: Stand-up comic
- Spouse(s): Sherry Rie Glenny (m. 2004; div. 2017) Michelle Nogoy (m. 2021)
- Website: johnheffron.com

John Heffron (born July 19, 1970) is an American stand-up comic.

== Career ==
John started his comedy career as a student at Eastern Michigan University, skipping night classes to perform stand-up comedy. He got his first gig as an emcee at the Main Street Comedy Showcase on the University of Michigan campus. After graduating, John immediately began working in his field of choice, touring the college circuit performing at more than 80 shows each year. By that time, he was already a seasoned comic with more than four years of experience. The college audience related to his type of humor, which talked about his days in college, the retro music that he and his classmates listened to and the Pop Rocks candy he played with as a kid. This material made him a hit on college campuses, where he recorded his first comedy CD Kid With A Cape.

By the age of 25, John was a successful headlining comedian who decided to also put his degrees in communications and psychology to work by taking a job as radio sidekick to Danny Bonaduce (later replaced by Steve Cochran) on the highly-rated Q95-5 Detroit radio morning show. He worked in Detroit for five years before making his way back to Los Angeles, making his home in Hollywood.

John has made numerous television appearances including NBC's The Tonight Show with Jay Leno, CBS's The Late Late Show with Craig Kilborn, two Comedy Central Presents specials, and two seasons of Last Comic Standing. He won the title of Last Comic Standing in season 2. In addition, John has performed at the prestigious Just For Laughs Comedy Festivals in Montreal and Bermuda, as well as the HBO Comedy Festival in Aspen.

Also an entrepreneur, John—along with partner Joel Zimmer—Heffron released a board game, That Guy Game, which puts girls on a scavenger hunt for guys. According to InStyle, Entertainment Weekly and Glamour magazines, it became an immediate hit when Julia Roberts, Drew Barrymore and SNL's Rachel Dratch were spotted buying the game. Entrepreneur magazine featured John and Joel in its 2001 "Hot 100" issue. John took the idea a step further by developing a television pilot based on the concept, which received a significant amount of industry attention.

He also was a regular on a number of VH1 television series including My Coolest Years: My First Time and I Love The 80s. He toured with Charlie Murphy and Joe Rogan on the Real Men of Comedy tour in the fall of 2006 sponsored by Maxim and Bud Light. His DVD Middle Class Funny was released in 2009.

John continues to tour the US performing stand-up.

== Personal life ==
John Heffron was born on July 19, 1970, in New York City and was raised in South Lyon, Michigan. He graduated in 1988 from South Lyon High School and in 1993 from Eastern Michigan University. In 2004, he married Sherry Rie Glenny; they divorced in 2017. John remarried in November of 2021 to yoga enthusiast Michelle Nogoy.

== Discography ==
- Kid With a Cape CD (1997)
- Good Kid, Bad Adult CD (2003)
- The Better Half CD (2006)
- Middle Class Funny DVD (2009)
- The Laughs You Deserve From The 70s, 80s, 90s & Today (2018)
- ’’ Episodes” (2019)
