= Whitmore Lake Secondary School =

High school in Michigan, United States

Location
- 7430 Whitmore Lake Road; Whitmore Lake, Michigan 48189; United States; 42°23′24″N 83°46′18″W

Information
- Established: 1950
- School district: Whitmore Lake Public Schools
- Superintendent: Tom DeKeyser
- Principal: Jill Henry
- Grades: 6-12
- Colors: Red and white
- Athletics conference: Michigan Independent Athletic Conference (MIAC)
- Nickname: Trojans
- Website: www.wlps.net/middle-and-high-school

Student assessments
- 2021–22 school year Change vs. prior year

M-STEP 11th grade proficiency rates (Science / Social Studies)
- Advanced %: 24.4 / 22.2
- Proficient %: 33.3 / 51.1
- PR. Proficient %: 17.8 / –
- Not Proficient %: 24.4 / ≤10

Average test scores
- SAT Total: 1030.4 (▼ −3.4)

Whitmore Lake Secondary School is a public secondary school in Whitmore Lake, Michigan. It serves grades 6-12 and is part of Whitmore Lake Public Schools.

== History ==
Whitmore Lake Secondary School moved to a new building for the commencement of classes in the fall of 2006.

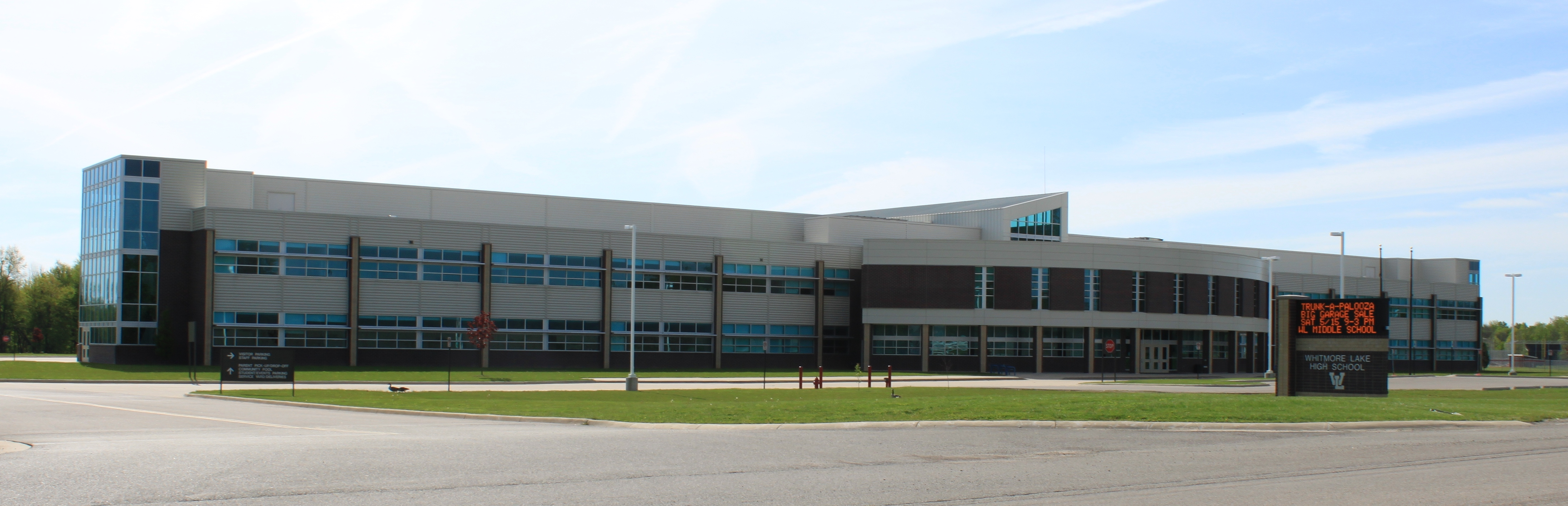
Whitmore Lake High School

== Athletics ==
The Whitmore Lake Trojans compete in the Michigan Independent Athletic Conference (MIAC.) The school colors are red and white. The following MHSAA sanctioned sports are offered:

- Baseball (boys)
- Basketball (boys & girls)
- Bowling (boys & girls)
- Competitive cheer (girls)
- Cross country (boys & girls)
  - Girls state champion - 1993, 1995, 1996, 2023, 2024
- Football (boys)
- Golf (boys)
- Softball (girls)
- Swim and dive (boys)
- Track and field (boys and girls)
- Volleyball (girls)
