= South Lyon, Michigan =

- City
- City of South Lyon
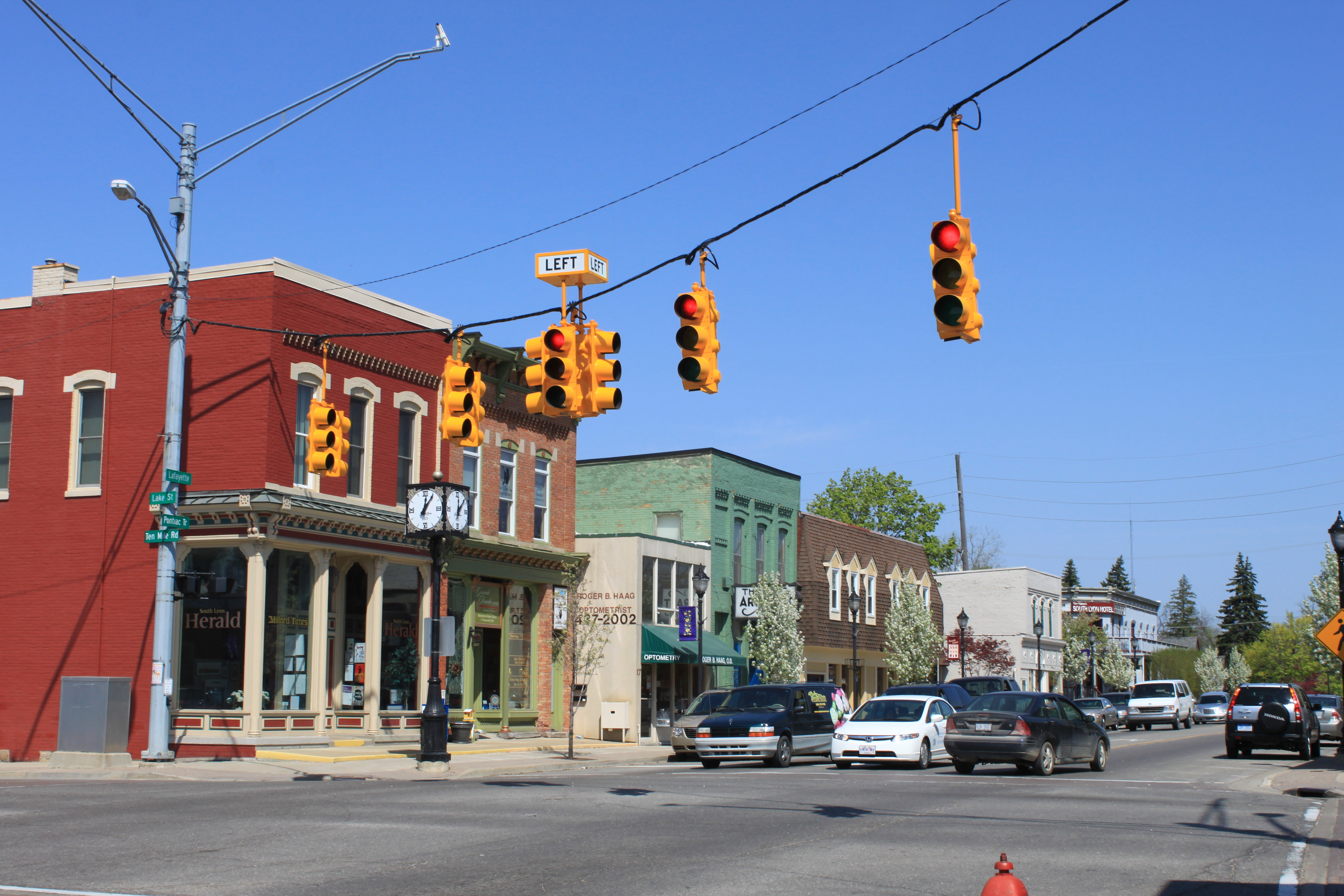
- Downtown South Lyon along Pontiac Trail

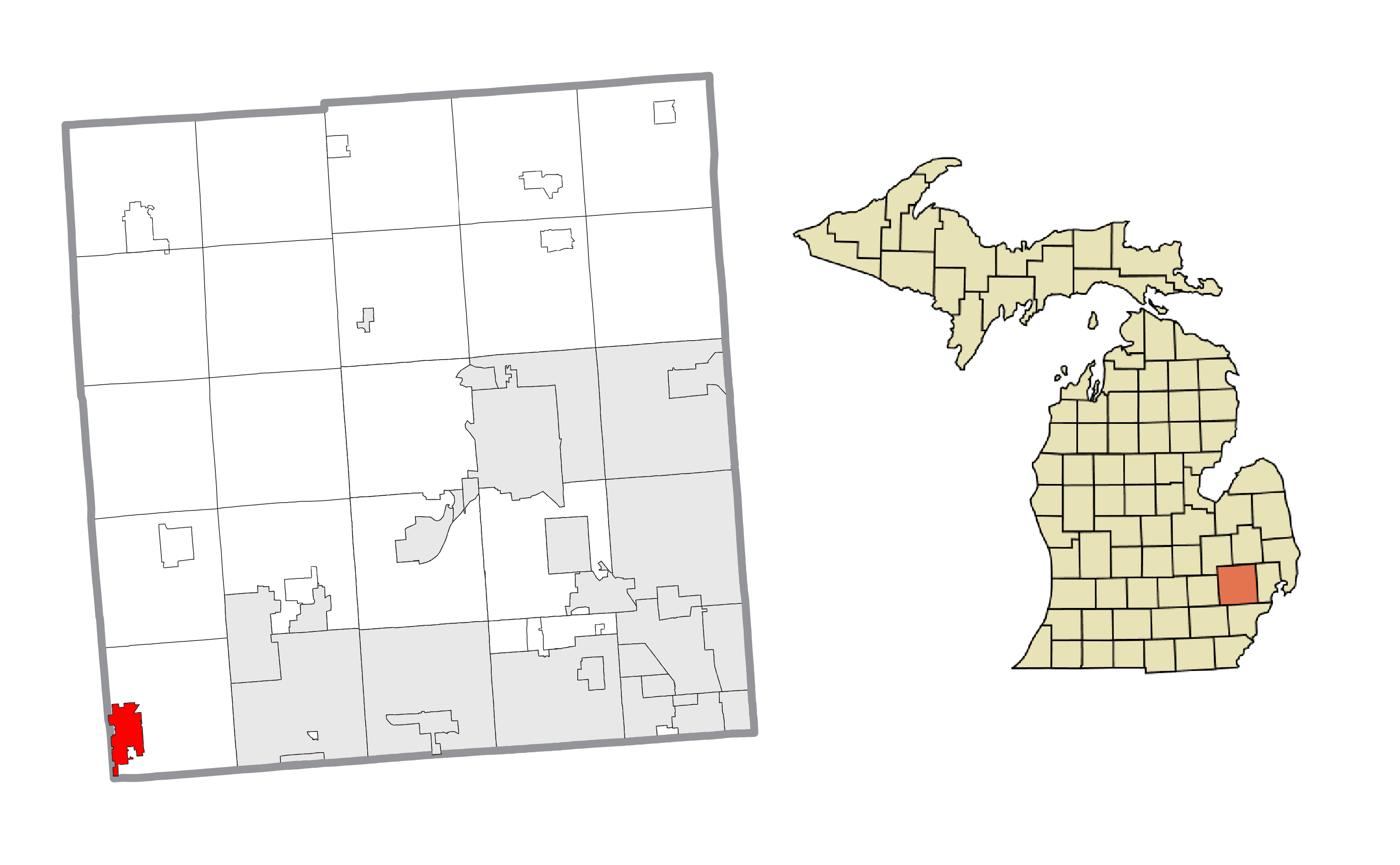
- Location within Oakland County

- Location within the state of Michigan Location within the United States
- Coordinates: 42°27′38″N 83°39′06″W
- Country: United States
- State: Michigan
- County: Oakland
- Settled: 1832
- Incorporated: 1873 (village); 1930 (city)

Government
  - Type: Council–manager
  - Mayor: Steve Kennedy
  - Manager: Paul C. Zelenak

Area
  - City: 3.75 sq mi (9.70 km^{2})
  - Land: 3.74 sq mi (9.69 km^{2})
  - Water: 0.0039 sq mi (0.01 km^{2})
- Elevation: 928 ft (283 m)

Population (2020)
  - City: 11,746
  - Density: 3,139.6/sq mi (1,212.19/km^{2})
  - Metro: 4,296,250 (Metro Detroit)
- Time zone: UTC-5 (Eastern (EST))
  - Summer (DST): UTC-4 (EDT)
- ZIP code(s): 48178
- Area code: 248
- FIPS code: 26-75100
- GNIS feature ID: 0638381
- Website: Official website

South Lyon is a city in Oakland County in the U.S. state of Michigan. The population was 11,746 at the 2020 census, up from 11,327 at the 2010 census. South Lyon is a western suburb in Metro Detroit located 36 miles (57.94 km) from downtown Detroit.

== Geography ==
According to the United States Census Bureau, the city has a total area of 3.74 square miles (9.69 km^{2}), of which 3.73 square miles (9.66 km^{2}) is land and 0.01 square miles (0.03 km^{2}) (0.27%) is water.

== History ==
South Lyon was founded in 1832 and was called Thompson's Corners. In the same year, the surrounding township was named Lyon after Lucius Lyon, a member of the state legislature. The village was given a name for its location within the township. South Lyon was incorporated as a village in 1873 and as a city in 1930.

Three rail lines once passed through South Lyon. In the summer of 1871, the Detroit, Lansing, and Northern Railroad were built west from Plymouth on the way to Lansing and Ionia. In 1880, the predecessor to the Ann Arbor Railroad built a line into town from Ann Arbor. This line's goal was to continue toward Pontiac, but that did not occur under the original owners. The line was pulled up around 1890. In 1883 the Grand Trunk built their Jackson Branch from Pontiac to Jackson, which crossed the Pere Marquette at South Lyon. The GTW branch line continued to serve South Lyon until the early 1980s. The branch line is now a paved bicycle trail through town, and Reynold Sweet Parkway follows the original route. Today, South Lyon hosts the CSX main line from Detroit to Grand Rapids, and a passing track is located there.

== Demographics ==
Historical population
Census	Pop.	Note	%±
1880	418		—
1890	707		69.1%
1900	657		−7.1%
1910	615		−6.4%
1920	615		0.0%
1930	844		37.2%
1940	1,017		20.5%
1950	1,312		29.0%
1960	1,753		33.6%
1970	2,675		52.6%
1980	5,214		94.9%
1990	5,857		12.3%
2000	10,036		71.4%
2010	11,327		12.9%
2020	11,746		3.7%
U.S. Decennial Census

=== 2020 census ===
As of the 2020 census, South Lyon had a population of 11,746. The median age was 41.9 years. 21.4% of residents were under the age of 18 and 18.2% of residents were 65 years of age or older. For every 100 females there were 90.6 males, and for every 100 females age 18 and over there were 87.4 males age 18 and over.

100.0% of residents lived in urban areas, while 0.0% lived in rural areas.

There were 5,044 households in South Lyon, of which 28.0% had children under the age of 18 living in them. Of all households, 46.9% were married-couple households, 16.5% were households with a male householder and no spouse or partner present, and 31.1% were households with a female householder and no spouse or partner present. About 34.1% of all households were made up of individuals and 15.9% had someone living alone who was 65 years of age or older.

There were 5,316 housing units, of which 5.1% were vacant. The homeowner vacancy rate was 1.5% and the rental vacancy rate was 5.0%.

Racial composition as of the 2020 census
Race	Number	Percent
White	10,510	89.5%
Black or African American	131	1.1%
American Indian and Alaska Native	28	0.2%
Asian	305	2.6%
Native Hawaiian and Other Pacific Islander	0	0.0%
Other races	74	0.6%
Two or more races	698	5.9%
Hispanic or Latino (of any race)	373	3.2%

== Education ==
93% of South Lyon residents older than 25 have graduated from high school, and 42% have graduated from college with a bachelor's degree or higher.

=== South Lyon Community Schools ===
South Lyon is served by South Lyon Community Schools, a public school district that "includes three counties, three townships, and covers 83 square miles." It includes an Early Childhood Center, eight elementary schools (Bartlett Elementary, Brummer Elementary, Dolsen Elementary, Hardy Elementary, Kent Lake Elementary, Pearson Elementary, Salem Elementary, and Sayre Elementary), two middle schools (Millennium Middle School and Centennial Middle School), and two high schools (South Lyon High School and South Lyon East High School). Both high schools are members of the Lakes Valley Conference and the Michigan High School Athletic Association. (MHSAA).

== Government ==
South Lyon has a council-manager style of governance. The current mayor is Steve Kennedy, serving since 2023. The current city manager is Paul C. Zelenak, who has been serving since 2018, when he was hired from Linden, Michigan. The city council convenes bimonthly at City Hall and is currently composed of Lisa Dilg (Mayor Pro-Tem), Alex Hansen, Glenn Kivell, Margaret Kurtzweil, Lori Moiser, and Thad Bogert.

== Parks ==
=== McHattie Park ===
South Lyon's McHattie Park (on the west side of Pontiac Trail between 9 Mile and 10 Mile Roads) is a nearly 15-acre park that includes "playground equipment, little league ball diamonds, sand volleyball courts, sledding hill, along with plenty of open spaces for picnics and outdoor fun." It is also the location of the Witch's Hat Depot Museum and Historic Village. The historic village consists of six buildings: Washburn School (built 1907), Queen Anne Depot (aka the Witch's Hat, built 1909), the Caboose (circa 1926), the Little Village Chapel (built 1930), the Freight House (built 1984), and the Gazebo (1990). With the exceptions of the Freight House and the Gazebo, constructed on-site, the historic buildings were moved to the park from their original sites starting with the Witch's Hat in 1976. These buildings are open to the public at various times, and the Little Village Chapel is available for 75 guests or fewer wedding rentals. The South Lyon Historical Society is attempting to add a 100-year-old barn, currently located in Salem Township, to the site, with an estimated cost of $200,000.

McHattie Park and the Museum and Historic Village host public and private events. Concerts in the Park are held most weeks in the summertime, and the annual Depot Days festival is held in early autumn.

McHattie Park is also connected to a portion of the Huron Valley Rail Trail, a public pedestrian and bicycle trail that was once a rail line. The trail is managed by the Western Oakland County Trailway Management Council.

=== Volunteer Park ===
Volunteer Park is a 130-acre park located on Dixboro Road between 8 Mile and 9 Mile roads. It features a variety of sports fields, baseball diamonds, a volleyball court, and a picnic structure. It, too, is connected to the Huron Valley Rail Trail.

=== Paul Baker Memorial Park ===
Paul Baker Memorial Park is a small park that consists of a fountain, a small gazebo, and a few benches. It is located at the intersection of Lake Street and Reynold Sweet Parkway, beside the railroad tracks.

== Accidents ==
- South Lyon Hotel Fire: On June 23, 2016 at 2am a three alarm fire caused by a possible electrical problem resulted in the South Lyon Hotel burning down. The blaze resulted in the second floor and roof being destroyed, but the first floor and walls were saved. The Hotel reopened in the fall of 2017 after 12 months of construction
- The Lyon Cantina Fire: On December 31, 2019 a three alarm fire at the Lyon Cantina caused by a fire in the kitchen resulted in the building burning down as firefighters took a defensive strategy due to the blazes intensity.

== Notable people ==
- Trey Augustine – Detroit Red Wings goaltending prospect
- Dave Brandon – chairman & CEO of Toys "R" Us, former athletic director at the University of Michigan, former CEO of Domino's Pizza, and Valassis
- Anita Cochran – country music singer
- John Heffron – stand-up comedian
- Barbara Lewis – singer, "Baby, I'm Yours"
- Mitch Ryder – musician, The Detroit Wheels
- Danny Spanos – drummer for 1970s band Redbone, two solo albums in 1980s, hit song "Hot Cherie" reached #29 on Billboard AOR charts
- Edward D. Phelka - The 25th National Commander of Civil Air Patrol
