= List of Michigan State Historic Sites in Washtenaw County =

Location of Washtenaw County in Michigan

The following is a list of Michigan State Historic Sites in Washtenaw County, Michigan. Sites marked with a dagger (†) are also listed on the National Register of Historic Places in Washtenaw County, Michigan.

== Current listings ==
Name	Image	Location	City	Listing date
William Anderson House†		2301 Packard Road	Ann Arbor	July 26, 1974
Ann Arbor Central Fire Station†		Corner of 5th Avenue and Huron Street	Ann Arbor	April 23, 1971
Antislavery Society Informational Site		340 E. Huron Street (Ann Arbor News Building)	Ann Arbor	October 1, 1976
Ballard House		125 North Huron Street	Ypsilanti	February 17, 1965
Bell Road Bridge† / Dover Informational Designation		Bell Road at the Huron River	Dexter Township	July 17, 1997
Bell-Spalding House†		2117 Washtenaw Avenue	Ann Arbor	August 12, 1983
Bethel Church		10425 Bethel Church Road	Manchester vicinity	June 15, 1989
Bethlehem United Church of Christ		423 South Fourth Avenue	Ann Arbor	November 16, 1982
Blacksmith Shop		324 East Main Street	Manchester	April 18, 1983
Bridgewater Town Hall		10990 Clinton Road	Clinton	January 21, 1988
Brinkerhoff-Becker House†		601 West Forest Avenue	Ypsilanti	August 12, 1977
Edward DeMille Campbell House		1555 Washtenaw Avenue	Ann Arbor	January 8, 1981
John Cassidy House		17980 Waterloo Road	Chelsea	March 10, 1988
Central Title Service Building Informational Site		213 East Washington Street	Ann Arbor	December 15, 1986
Chelsea Depot† / Chelsea Informational Designation		150 Jackson Street	Chelsea	December 5, 1986
Cleary College Informational Designation		2170 Washtenaw	Ypsilanti	April 18, 1983
John Wesley Conant House		5683 Napier Road	Salem Township	December 20, 1989
Martha Cook Building		906 South University Avenue	Ann Arbor	October 10, 1989
Corey House		1219 Traver Street	Ann Arbor	November 2, 1980
Davenport House†		300 East Michigan Avenue	Saline	July 21, 1972
Delta Upsilon Fraternity House†		1331 Hill Street	Ann Arbor	July 18, 1991
Detroit Observatory-University of Michigan†		1308 Ann Street	Ann Arbor	February 19, 1958
Dexter Depot / Track Pans Informational Designation		3487 Broad, NW corner of Broad and Third	Dexter	April 10, 1986
Judge Samuel W. Dexter House†		8347 Island Lake Road	Dexter vicinity	February 19, 1958
Dixboro General Store		5210 Plymouth Road	Dixboro	October 2, 1980
Dixboro United Methodist Church†		5221 Church Street	Dixboro	October 1, 1971
Earhart Manor		4090 Geddes Road	Ann Arbor	July 17, 1997
Eastern Michigan College Informational Designation		Southwest corner of College Place and Forest Avenue, between Pierce and Boone halls	Ypsilanti	September 25, 1956
Governor Alpheus Felch Informational Designation		Felch Park, 121 Fletcher	Ann Arbor	September 7, 1973
David M. Finley House		1209 N Zeeb Road	Ann Arbor vicinity	June 18, 1982
First Baptist Church		1110 West Cross Street	Ypsilanti	February 19, 1987
First Congregational Church		121 East Middle Street	Chelsea	November 16, 1995
First Methodist Episcopal Church		209 Washtenaw Avenue	Ypsilanti	February 29, 1996
First Presbyterian Church		300 North Washington	Ypsilanti	January 19, 1989
Fleming Creek Mill		4650 Geddes Road	Ann Arbor vicinity	April 5, 1974
Fountain-Bessac House†		102 West Main Street	Manchester	September 16, 1986
Henry S. Frieze House†		1547 Washtenaw Avenue	Ann Arbor	June 16, 1972
Michigan Becomes a State Informational Designation		Northeast corner of North Main Street and East Huron Street, at the Washtenaw County Building	Ann Arbor	September 18, 1964
Glazier Stove Company Warehouse and Clocktower Building		310 Main Street	Chelsea	January 23, 1997
George P. Glazier Memorial Building		122 South Main Street	Chelsea	June 13, 1986
The German Church		324 West Main Street, west of McComb Street	Manchester	April 28, 1987
Henry C. Gregory House		3294 Broad Street	Dexter	February 23, 1981
Hudson Mills Informational Designation		South of N Territorial Road, just west of Huron River Drive	Dexter vicinity	April 23, 1971
Hutchinson House		600 N River Street	Ypsilanti	July 17, 1975
Kappa Alpha Theta Fraternity House		1414 Washtenaw Avenue	Ann Arbor	April 29, 1982
Kellogg-Warden House†		500 Main Street	Ann Arbor	April 18, 1996
Kempf House† (also known as the Henry Bennett House)		312 South Division Street	Ann Arbor	May 17, 1973
Ladies' Literary Club†		218 North Washington Street	Ypsilanti	May 12, 1965
James A. Lynch House / Manchester Township Library		202 West Main Street	Manchester	February 19, 1987
Manchester Grist Mill		201 E Main	Manchester	November 16, 1989
Elijah McCoy Commemorative Designation		229 West Michigan Avenue	Ypsilanti	January 20, 1994
Michigan Central Freighthouse		435 Market Place	Ypsilanti	July 17, 1997
Michigan Central Railroad Depot		401 Depot Street	Ann Arbor	July 26, 1974
Michigan Interurbans Informational Designation		Northwest corner of the intersection of East Michigan Avenue and North Park Street	Ypsilanti	January 19, 1957
Michigan Municipal League Informational Designation		1675 Green Road	Ann Arbor	June 15, 1992
Michigan Theater Building†		603 East Liberty	Ann Arbor	September 17, 1981
Michigan's First Jewish Cemetery Site		SW corner of E Huron and Fletcher streets	Ann Arbor	September 24, 1982
Milan Old Village Hall and Fire Station		153 East Main Street	Milan	June 20, 1985
Newberry Hall†		434 South State Street	Ann Arbor	August 13, 1971
North Lake Methodist Church		14111 North Territorial Road	Chelsea vicinity	February 11, 1972
Northern Brewery†		1327 Jones Drive	Ann Arbor	November 7, 1977
Albert H. Pattengill House		1405 Hill Street	Ann Arbor	May 8, 1984
Phi Delta Theta Fraternity House		1437 Washtenaw Avenue	Ann Arbor	March 22, 1983
Esek Pray House		8755 West Plymouth-Ann Arbor Road	Superior Township	September 16, 1986
President's House, University of Michigan		815 South University (University of Michigan campus)	Ann Arbor	February 19, 1958
Prospect Park		Prospect Avenue and Cross Street	Ypsilanti	November 30, 1983
John and Mary Raywalt House		8120 Huron Street	Dexter	March 19, 1992
Saint Andrew's Church		306 North Division	Ann Arbor	July 26, 1974
Saint Andrews Lutheran Church		3443 Inverness	Dexter	July 19, 1990
Saint Joseph's Church		3430 Dover Street	Dexter	July 26, 1978
Saint Mary Church		210 West Main Street	Manchester	June 20, 1991
St. Patrick's Church		5671 Whitmore Lake Road	Northfield Township	December 14, 1976
Thomas Church / Saint Thomas Cemetery		10001 West Ellsworth Road	Freedom Township	May 21, 1992
St. Thomas the Apostle Church		530 Elizabeth Street	Ann Arbor	July 20, 1984
Salem Church		19980 Pleasant Lake Road, NW corner of M-52	Sharon Township	March 19, 1980
Salem Methodist Episcopal Church and Salem Walker Cemetery†		7150 Angle Road	Salem	July 18, 1991
Saline Presbyterian Church		143 East Michigan Avenue	Saline	August 3, 1995
Saline / Salt Springs		104 South Ann Arbor Street	Saline	2017
Science and Manual Training Building-Eastern Michigan University		Northwest corner of Putnam and West Forest	Ypsilanti	May 17, 1978
Sharon Mills		5701 Sharon Hollow Road	Sharon	November 16, 1989
Starkweather Hall†		901 West Forest	Ypsilanti	September 29, 1972
Superior and Ann Arbor Fractional District No. 2 Schoolhouse		5201 Plymouth Road	Dixboro	June 15, 1984
Ticknor-Campbell House†		2781 Packard Road	Ann Arbor	May 17, 1973
Toledo, Ann Arbor and Northern Michigan Railroad Ann Arbor Depot		416 S. Ashley	Ann Arbor	
University of Michigan Informational Designation		Northwest corner of the Graduate Library	Ann Arbor	July 19, 1956
Webster Township Hall		5001 Gregory Road (at Scully Road)	Dexter vicinity	November 16, 1982
Webster United Church of Christ		5484 Webster Church Road	Dexter vicinity	November 2, 1980
Welfare Building		300 North Main	Chelsea	August 3, 1979
Orrin White House†		2940 Fuller Road	Ann Arbor vicinity	November 6, 1970
John Williams House		4580 Farrell Road	Webster Township	June 23, 1983
Willow Run		Bounded by Tyler Road, Hudson Road, and US-12	Ypsilanti Township	August 24, 1978
Judge Robert S. Wilson House†		126 North Division Street	Ann Arbor	February 19, 1958
Ypsilanti Area Informational Designation		Ypsilanti Historical Museum, 220 N Huron, between Michigan Avenue and Cross Street	Ypsilanti	June 23, 1962
Ypsilanti Historic District†		Approximately 200 resources within an irregular boundary along Huron River extending to Forest Avenue, Grove, Buffalo and Hamilton Streets	Ypsilanti	June 28, 1973
Ypsilanti Water Tower†		Cross Street at Summit Street	Ypsilanti	September 21, 1988
Zion Lutheran Church		3050 South Fletcher Road	Freedom Township	October 23, 1979

== See also ==
- National Register of Historic Places listings in Washtenaw County, Michigan

== Sources ==
- Historic Sites Online – Washtenaw County. Michigan State Housing Developmental Authority. Accessed January 5, 2011.
