= East Michigan Avenue Historic District =

- U.S. National Register of Historic Places
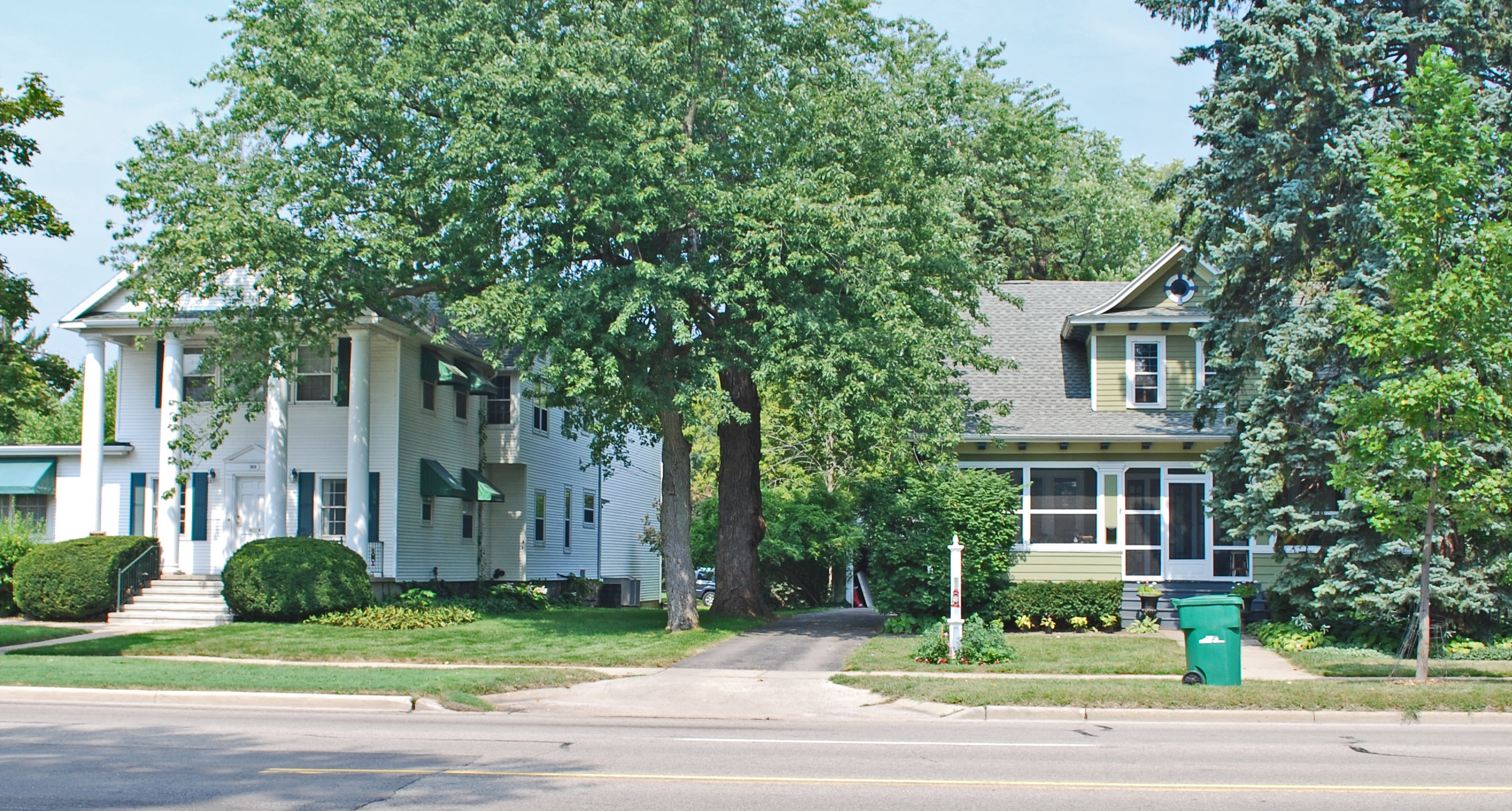
- Houses on East Michigan
- Interactive map
- Location: 300-321 E. Michigan Ave., 99-103 Maple St., and 217, 300 and 302 E. Henry, Saline, Michigan
- Coordinates: 42°10′9″N 83°46′32″W
- Area: 16 acres (6.5 ha)
- Architect: Multiple
- Architectural style: Colonial Revival, Bungalow/craftsman, Late Victorian
- MPS: Saline MRA
- NRHP reference No.: 85002953
- Added to NRHP: October 10, 1985

The East Michigan Avenue Historic District is a residential historic district located at 300-321 East Michigan Avenue, 99-103 Maple Street, and 217, 300 and 302 East Henry in Saline, Michigan. It was listed on the National Register of Historic Places in 1985.

The East Michigan Avenue Historic District consists of eighteen houses with nine barns and carriage houses clustered around the distinctive William H. Davenport House, which is individually listed on the National Register. The houses were constructed during the period of 1870-1920, and include architectural styles ranging from Queen Anne and Second Empire to Colonial Revival and Bungalow. The William Davenport house occupies an entire city block along Michigan, with the bulk of the structures in the district facing it.

The houses along Michigan, as well as on the adjacent properties on Maple, are on lots of fairly uniform size, with wide lawns and large setbacks. Several were constructed in a Queen Anne or Colonial Revival style by builder Elwood Rogers, and so there is a uniformity in scale and design. Although all houses in the district are of superior design and quality, the three properties on Henry, behind the Davenport house, are included because of their exceptional value.

The most significant houses in the district are:

- Max Fosdick House (303 E. Michigan) Built in 1917–18, this bungalow is an outstanding example because of the integrity of its design. It was built for Max Fosdick, the grandson of local farmers and an employee of Detroit Edison. The house is a 1 1/2-story frame building, with a roof ridge sweeping toward the street to enclose a one-story full-width front porch. A dormer with a porthole window is positioned over the entrance. Brackets support both the dormer and roofline.
- Willis M. Fowler House (315 E. Michigan) Built in 1911, this 2 1/2-story frame house was constructed by builder Elwood Rogers for William Fowler, a real estate businessman. It has a hipped roof, projecting gables with fan-shaped windows, and an off-center entrance.
- George Seeger House (101 Maple) Built in the early 1900s, this 2 1/2-story Colonial Revival house was also constructed by builder Elwood Rogers for George Seeger, the son of prominent German American farmer Matthias Seeger. The house has a steeply pitched hipped roof with cross gables, a one-story rear extension, and a rounded wraparound porch in the front.
- Beverly Davenport House (302 E. Henry) This house was built in 1873, when local businessman William Davenport hired Detroit architect J.J. Smith to design this house for his son, Beverly. Beverly Davenport joined his father's mercantile firm, and was eventually cashier and then president of the Citizens Bank. The house is a 2 1/2-story frame Second Empire structure with a central projecting bay containing a flared gabled roof, squared-off top, and bargeboard trim. It has a mansard roof with porthole dormers and brackets below the eaves.
- William H. Davenport House (300 E. Michigan) This house was designed by Detroit architect William Scott and built in 1876 for prominent businessman William Davenport. It is a frame structure with a slate mansard roof and a corner tower. Exterior decoration includes ornate brackets, corbels, lintels, and dormers.

== Gallery ==
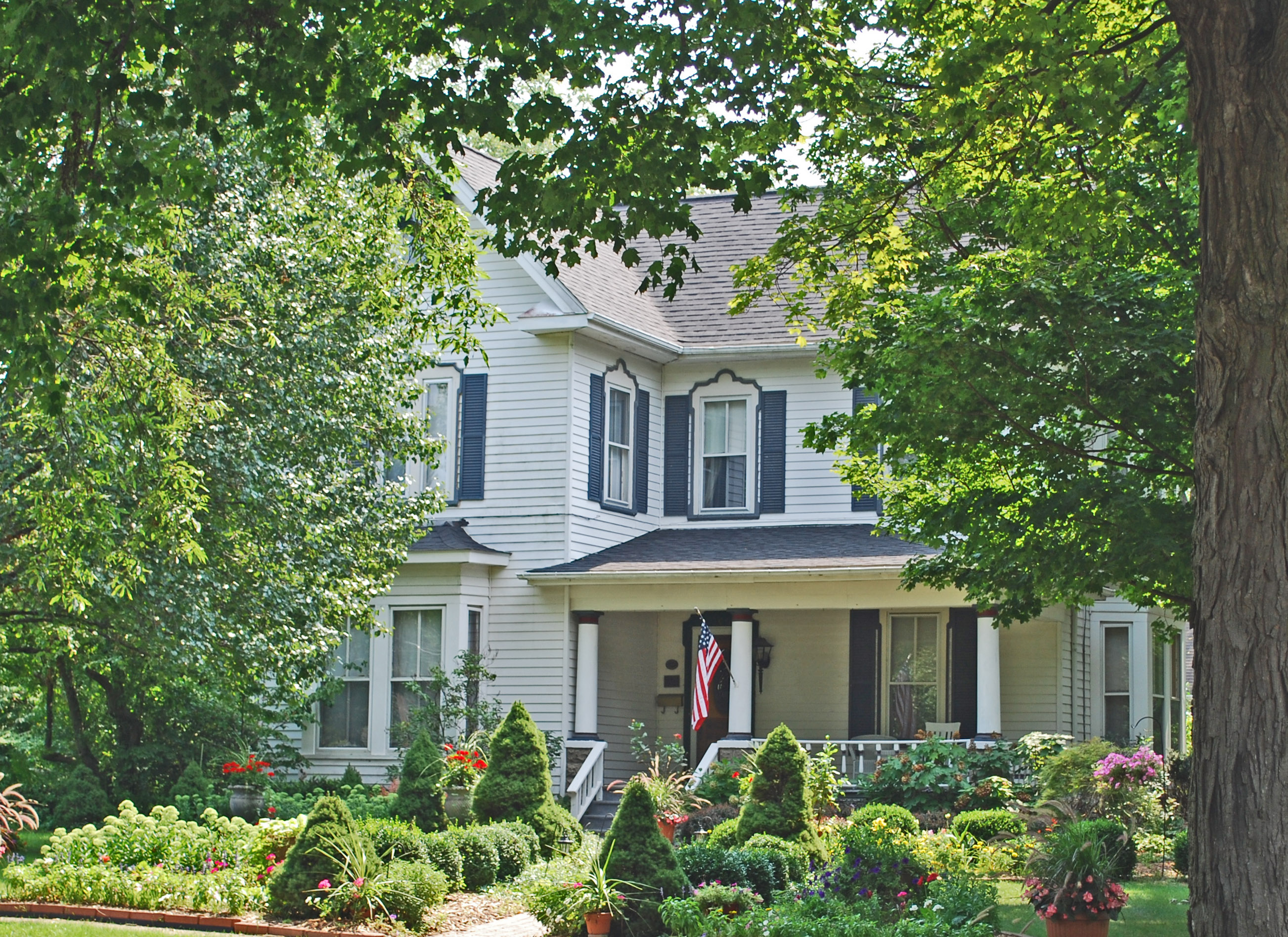
House on Henry

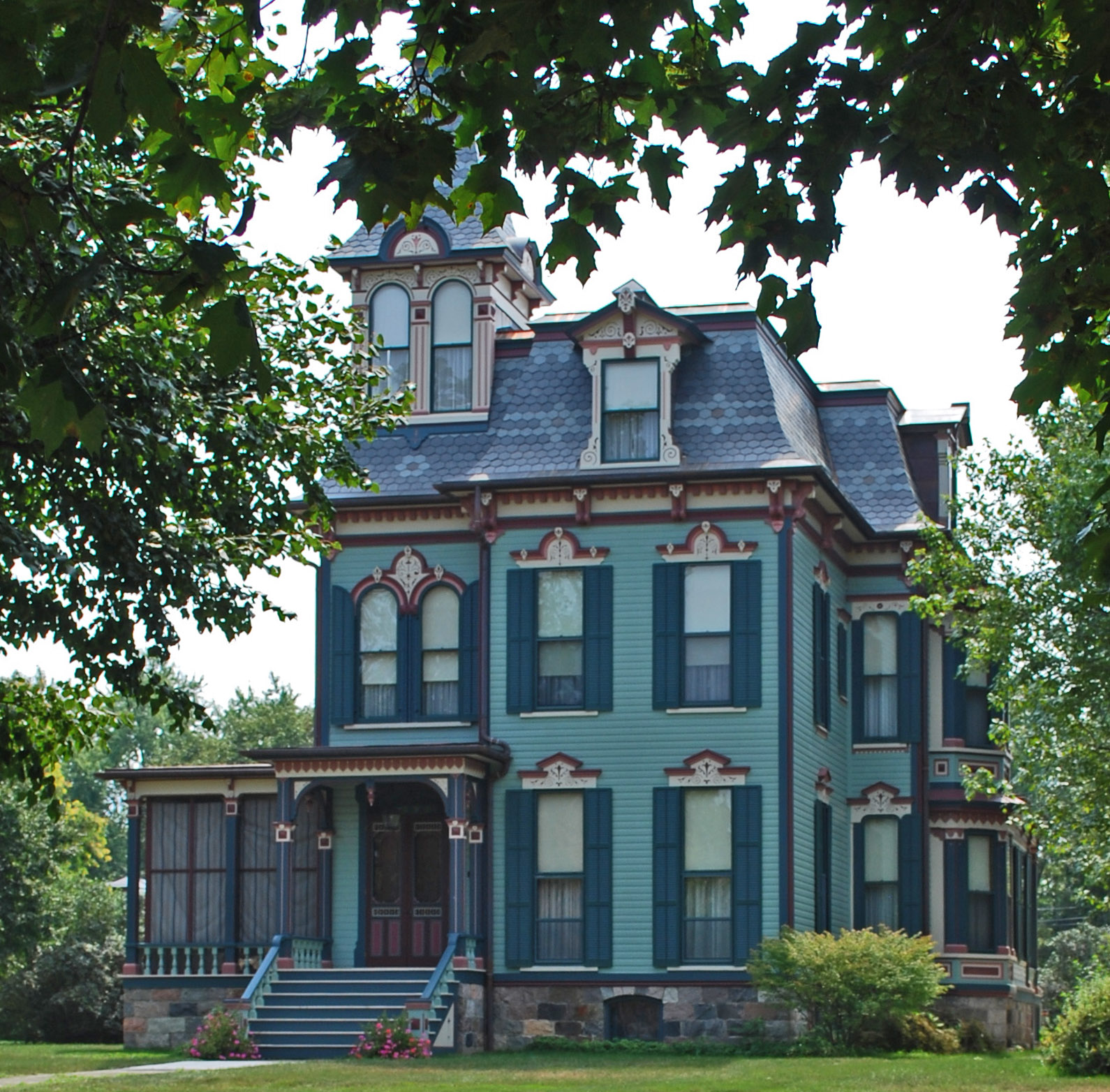
William H Davenport House
