= Orrin White House =

Historic house in Michigan, United States

- U.S. National Register of Historic Places
- Michigan State Historic Site
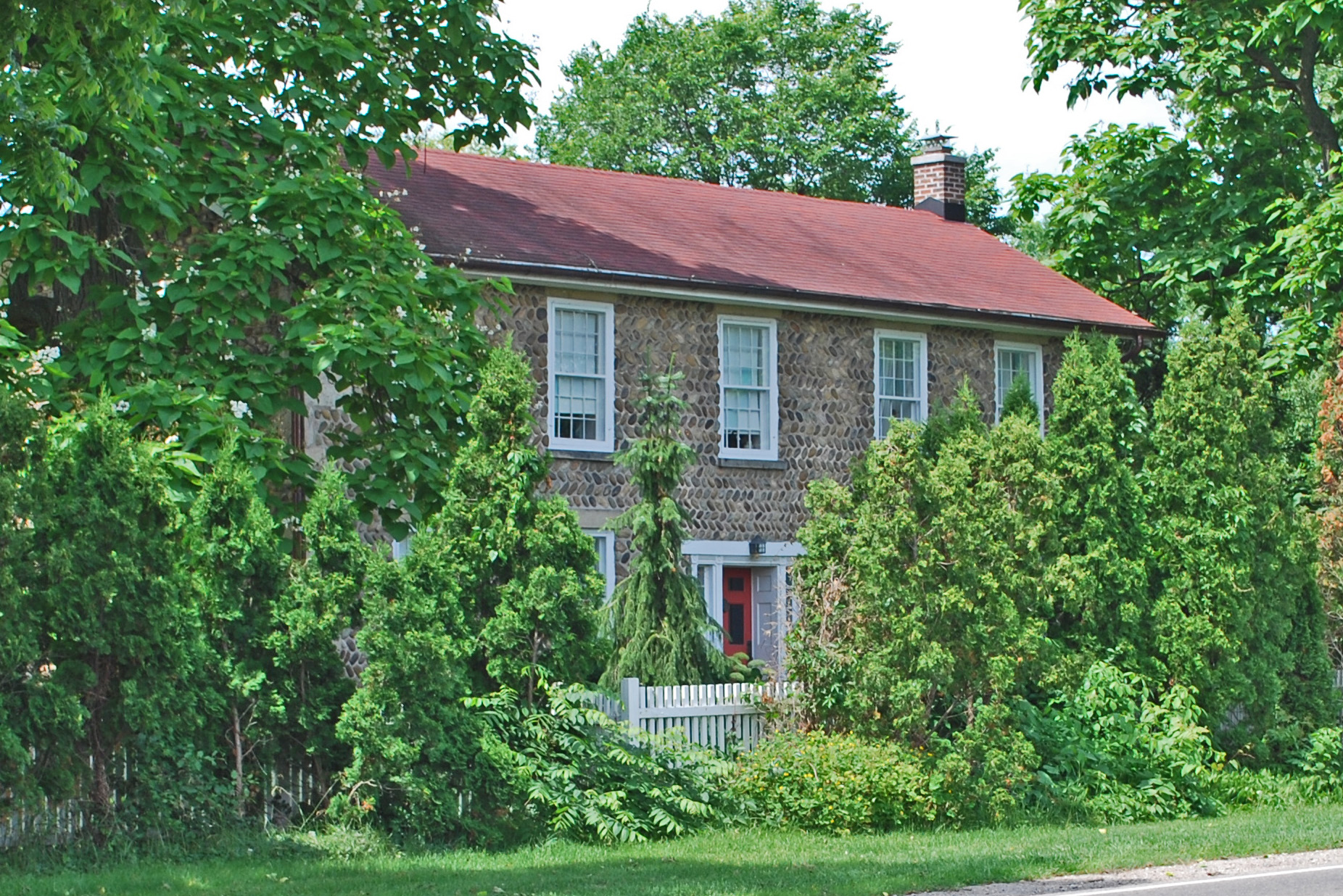

- Location within Michigan Location within the United States
- Interactive map
- Location: 2940 Fuller Rd., Ann Arbor, Michigan
- Coordinates: 42°16′41″N 83°42′7″W
- Area: 0.8 acres (0.32 ha)
- Built: 1836
- Built by: Orrin White
- Architectural style: Cobblestone construction
- NRHP reference No.: 71000421

Significant dates
- Added to NRHP: April 16, 1971
- Designated MSHS: November 6, 1970

The Orrin White House, also known as the Orrin and Ann Thayer White House or the Robert Hodges Residence, is a private house located at 2940 Fuller Road in Ann Arbor, Michigan. It was designated a Michigan State Historic Site in 1970 and listed on the National Register of Historic Places in 1971.

== History ==
Orrin White lived in Palmyra, New York, where he worked as a merchant and married Ann Thayer. In 1823, White journeyed to Michigan and claimed land along the Huron River. He wrapped up his affairs in New York, then returned in 1824 with his wife Ann and father-in-law Nathan Thayer to permanently settle his land. White built a small shanty where Huron High School now stands, becoming the first settler of Ann Arbor Township outside the village of Ann Arbor. In the 1920s, several hundred Native Americans camped in that area annually, while en route to Windsor to receive treaty gifts from the British (their allies in the War of 1812).

White was very active in the Ann Arbor community, serving as Washtenaw County Commissioner in 1827, sheriff in 1832, associate Circuit Court judge from 1833 to 1837, constitutional convention delegate in 1835, and on the state legislature in 1842.

Between 1836 and 1840, Orrin and Ann White built this house out of cobblestones, one section at a time, using patterns typically found in New York. The Whites may have had help from local builder Steven Mills, who built the nearby Ticknor-Campbell House. Orrin White died in 1864.

The Orrin White House was fully restored by Robert and Nan Hodges in the 1970s and 1980s. The structure remains in excellent condition and is still used as a private residence.

== Description ==
The Orrin White House is a two-story frame house covered with cobblestones, built in an L shape with a side-gable rectangular portion and an addition to the rear. The front facade features herringbone patterned cobblestones, while on the remaining elevations the cobblestones are laid randomly. The center front entrance is recessed and surrounded by incised columns and handmade glass sidelights. Stone quoins are on the corners. The ends of the gables feature pierced trusswork in the form of hexes.
