= Bell Road Bridge =

NRHP-listed bridge in United States

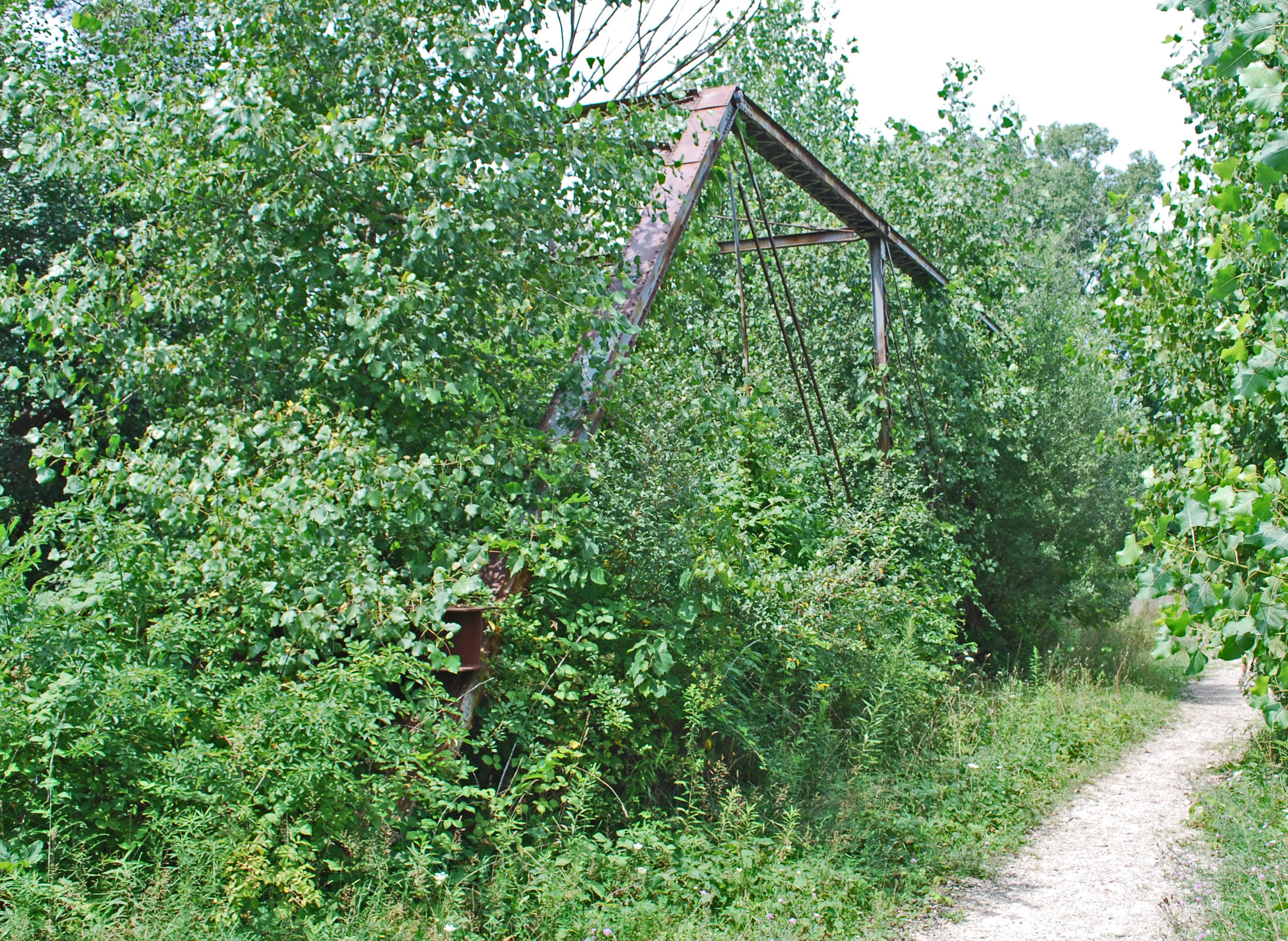
- Bridge on land in overgrown brush in 2010
- Coordinates: 42.4015°N 83.9086°W

Characteristics
- Total length: 103 feet 6 inches (31.55 m)
- Width: 13 feet 5 inches (4.09 m)
- Bell Road Bridge
- U.S. National Register of Historic Places
- Michigan State Historic Site
- Location within Michigan Location within the United States
- Built: 1891
- NRHP reference No.: 96001380

Significant dates
- Added to NRHP: November 29, 1996
- Designated MSHS: June 17, 1997

Location
- Interactive map of Bell Road Bridge

The Bell Road Bridge is a Pratt through truss bridge in Dexter Township, Washtenaw County, Michigan. Built in 1891, the bridge carried Bell Road over the Huron River. From 1997 to 2018, the bridge sat on the riverbank, overgrown with brush. The bridge is a Michigan State Historic Site and is listed on the National Register of Historic Places.

== History ==
The bridge was built by the Wrought Iron Bridge Company of Canton, Ohio, in 1891. A local crew assembled it with iron connecting pins, a method unique to the nineteenth century. The bridge was at the site of the town of Dover, a mill town of which little currently remains.

In late 1992, a drunk driver crashed into an end post on the bridge, resulting in its closure for part of 1993. Residents complained about having to detour a significant distance, so the bridge was reopened by the county road commission with a 4-short-ton (3.6 t) weight limit, preventing its use by heavy vehicles. However, abutment stones continued to dislodge themselves, and the bridge was again closed to traffic. In 1995, the road commission requested funds from the state's Critical Bridge Fund for the replacement of the bridge with a two-lane concrete structure. However, residents wished to see the bridge repaired, and they successfully convinced the road commission to not seek a replacement. They also pushed for listing the bridge on the National Register of Historic Places; the bridge was listed on November 29, 1996. It is the third oldest known bridge built by the Wrought Iron Bridge Company still in existence. It is also one of about ten metal through truss bridges in Michigan that date from the nineteenth century.

By 1997, the abutments were in such poor condition that it was feared that the bridge would be washed away in a spring flood, so it was removed from its abutments and placed on the southeastern riverbank. Since it was moved to the riverbank, the bridge has become overgrown with brush. On June 17, 1997, it was designated a Michigan State Historic Site and an informational marker was erected on February 2, 1999. Because of the bridge's deteriorated state, its National Register of Historic Places plaque is located not on the bridge, but in the garage of resident Bill Klinke.

On February 17, 2015, Dexter Township relinquished its right of first refusal to keep ownership of the bridge, allowing another municipality interested in relocating and rehabbing it for pedestrian use along the Border to Border trail to claim it.

In 2018, the bridge was relocated to a storage facility in Holt, Michigan to await repair and potential reuse as part of the Border-to-Border Trail.

== Design ==
The bridge is a single-span, one-lane Pratt through truss. It is 103 feet 6 inches (31.55 m) long and 13 feet 5 inches (4.09 m) wide. Its abutments are made of fieldstone. Prior to removal from its abutments, the bridge carried Bell Road over the Huron River.

== See also ==
- List of bridges on the National Register of Historic Places in Michigan
- National Register of Historic Places listings in Washtenaw County, Michigan
