= Judge Robert S. Wilson House =

Historic house in Michigan, United States

- U.S. National Register of Historic Places
- Michigan State Historic Site
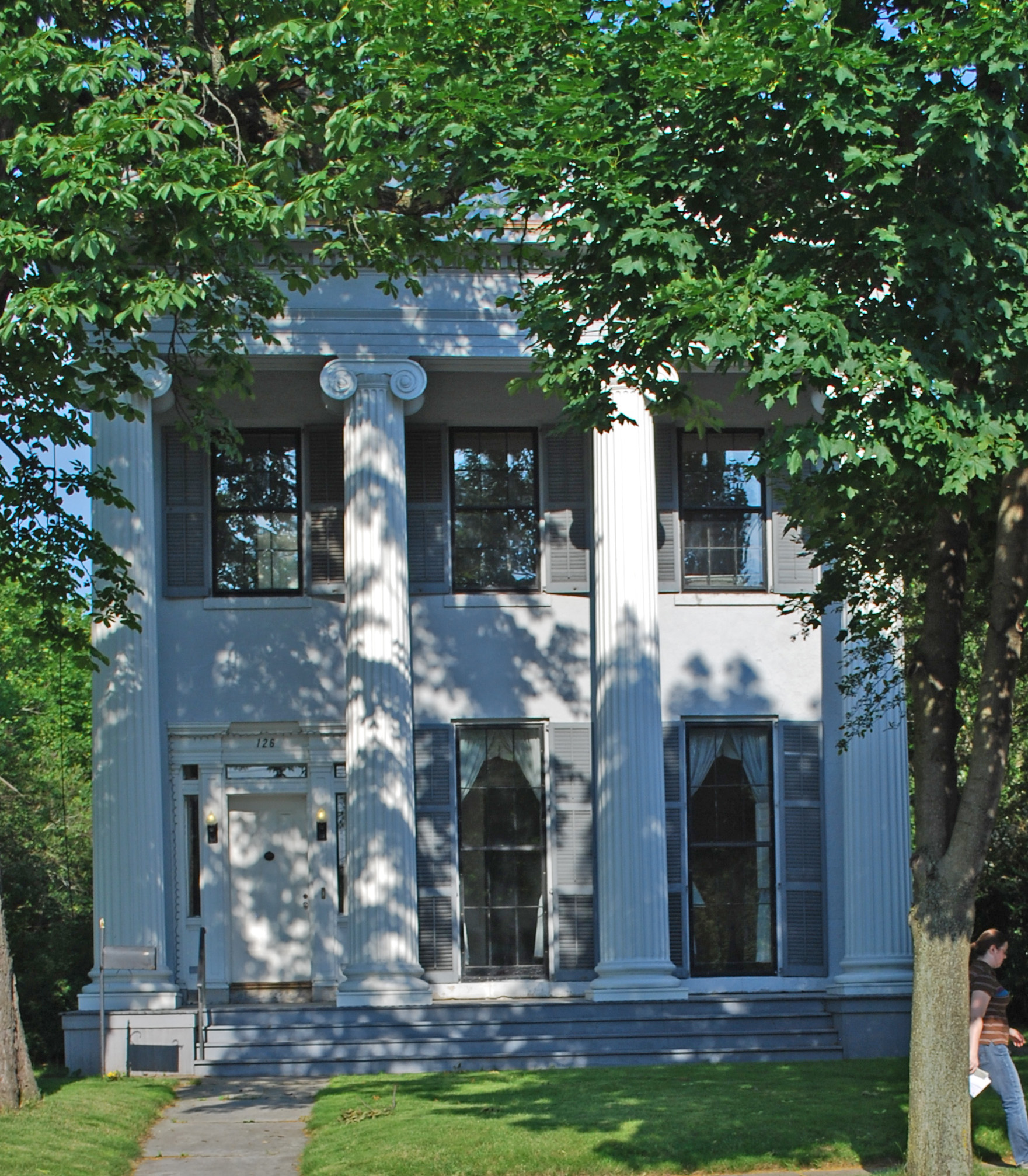

- Location within Michigan Location within the United States
- Interactive map showing Judge Robert S. Wilson House
- Location: 126 N. Division St., Ann Arbor, Michigan
- Coordinates: 42°16′55″N 83°44′37″W
- Area: less than one acre
- Built: 1839
- Architectural style: Greek Revival
- NRHP reference No.: 72000663
- Added to NRHP: March 16, 1972

The Judge Robert S. Wilson House, also known as the Wilson-Wahr House, is a private house located at 126 North Division Street in Ann Arbor, Michigan. It was listed on the National Register of Historic Places in 1972.

== History ==
Robert S. Wilson was an attorney who moved from Allegheny County, New York, to Ann Arbor in 1835. He was Judge of the Washtenaw County Probate court for a year, and served in the Michigan House of Representatives. In approximately 1839, Wilson had this house built on a lot in Ann Arbor. He lived there until 1850, when he moved to Chicago and sold the house to John H. Welles.

Welles is thought to have constructed the rear addition to the house, and made other extensive alterations. It is likely that the middle section was built in 1835, the temple portion was added in 1843, and the kitchen and servants quarters were added in 1850. In 1855, Welles' son Henry moved into the house with his four daughters (Clarissa, Sarah, Mary Fiske, and Susan Holly), after the death of his wife. Henry Welles died in 1860, and the house passed to successive owners. In 1893, the house was sold in a tax sale to George Wahr, and his wife, Emma (Staebler) Wahr. The Wahr family constructed another house next door as their residence, and rented the house to sororities and fraternities. After 20 years, they moved back into the main Wilson-Wahr House. The house passed on to the Wahr's daughter, Natalie Wahr Sallade (who died in 1974), and the Sallades occupied the house until 2002 when it was purchased by Norman and Ilene Tyler.

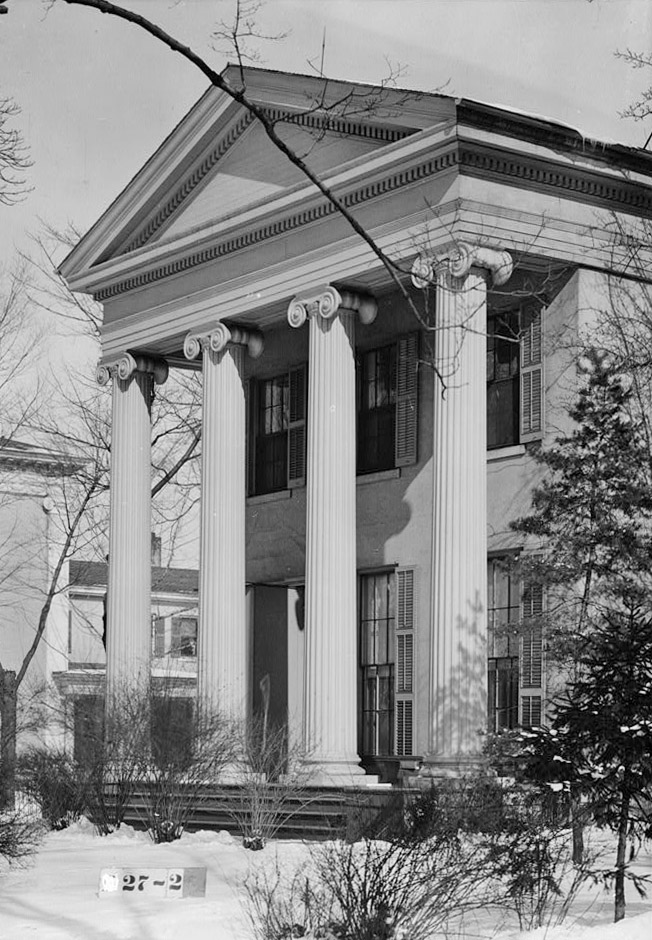
Greek Revival style facade with Ionic columns.

== Architecture ==
The Robert S. Wilson House is a two-story Greek Revival structure constructed of brick with a stucco finish on a stone foundation. Nearly every survey of Michigan architecture has singled out the Wilson House as an outstanding specimen of Neoclassical architecture design. Architect Fiske Kimball attributed its "four study Ionic columns, rising through two stories, with graceful flutes and capitals" to the original Temple of the Wingless Victory at Athens.

The front facade boasts a full-width portico with Ionic fluted shaft columns, and an entryway framed by matching pilasters. Windows have external shutters. A two-story addition on the rear was likely constructed more recently than the main portion of the house.

Interior

Inside, the main section of the house is two parlors deep with a hall containing a stairwell to the side. The rear addition has a side entrance into another stair hall. All the major rooms in the house have fireplaces.

== See also ==
- National Register of Historic Places listings in Washtenaw County, Michigan
- Buildings and structures in Ann Arbor, Michigan
