= Northern Brewery =

- U.S. National Register of Historic Places
- Michigan State Historic Site
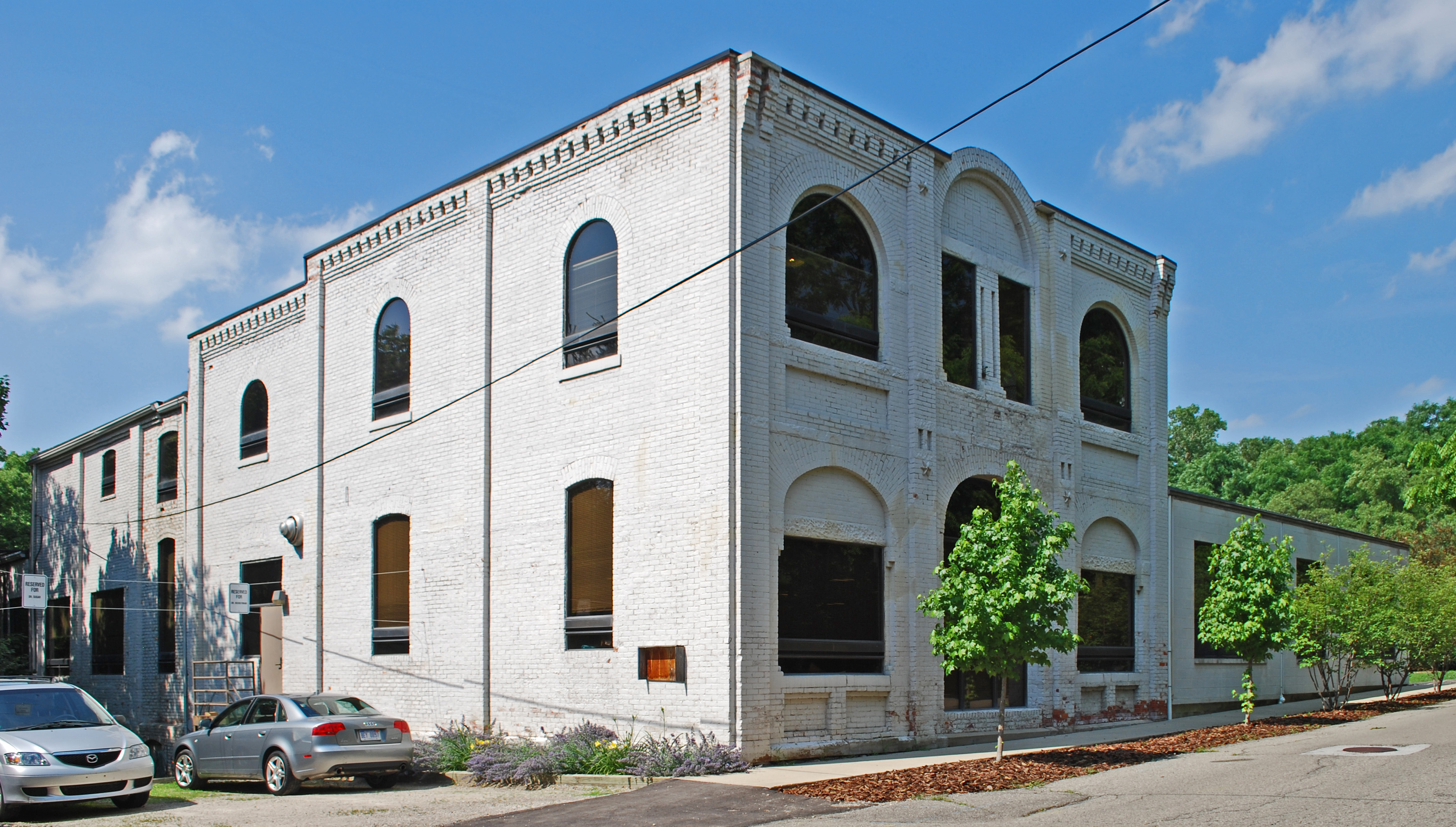
- Interactive map
- Location: 1327 Jones Dr, Ann Arbor, Michigan
- Coordinates: 42°17′33″N 83°44′05″W
- Area: 1.3 acres (0.53 ha)
- Built: 1886
- Architectural style: Late Victorian, Richardsonian Romanesque, Industrial
- NRHP reference No.: 79001170
- Added to NRHP: November 20, 1979

The Northern Brewery is a former industrial building located at 1327 Jones Drive in Ann Arbor, Michigan. It was listed on the National Register of Historic Places in 1979.

== History ==
In 1872 George Krause opened a brewery on this site. In 1884, Herman Hardinghaus took over brewery operations. Hardinghaus was the son of a brewer, and had already run breweries in several other cities. By 1886, the Northern Brewery had become prosperous enough that Hardinghaus was able to construct this building to house the establishment. The building was located over a natural spring, which was used by the brewery to make its beer. However, due to the consolidation of national breweries, smaller local establishments like Northern Brewery were unable to compete. The last beer brewed here was in 1908, when brewer Ernest Rehberg ceased production. Rehberg ran an ice business from this location for a time, using the natural spring water as a source. The building was later converted to a creamery, and in 1922 was used as the Ann Arbor Foundry.

The Ann Arbor Foundry was particularly notable as it was a long-standing partnership operated by Charles Baker and Tom Cook, an African-American and a Jewish immigrant from Russia. Their small-scale foundry flourished for almost 50 years, and provided career opportunities for minorities. The partnership lasted until Cook's death in 1971. In 1972, after a state citation for air pollution, the foundry was closed. The building remained vacant until 1978 when the architectural firm of Fry/Peters renovated it for office space.

The building has been occupied since 2009 by the Tech Brewery, a startup incubator. Cybersecurity firm Duo Security started in the Tech Brewery before its eventual acquisition by Cisco.

== Description ==
The Northern Brewery is a two-story, brick commercial structure with a Richardsonian Romanesque-inspired facade. The original portion of the structure is a rectangular section measuring thirty-eight by fifty-four feet. The facade is three bays wide, with each bay containing segmental-arch or round-head window areas separated by pilasters. The center archway on the first floor originally housed the entrance, but was converted into a window during the 1970s renovation. The window areas have rough-cut stone lintels. A central window construction on the second floor contains a distinctive arch panel filled with basket weave brick.

The building has several additions, including a two-story, 38 ft × 32 ft (11.6 m × 9.8 m) rear ell and a single-story 52 ft × 110 ft (16 m × 34 m) block addition on the side.
