= Michigan Alpha Chapter House of Phi Delta Theta =

Historic house in Michigan, U.S.

Coordinates: 42.27479°N 83.73025°W

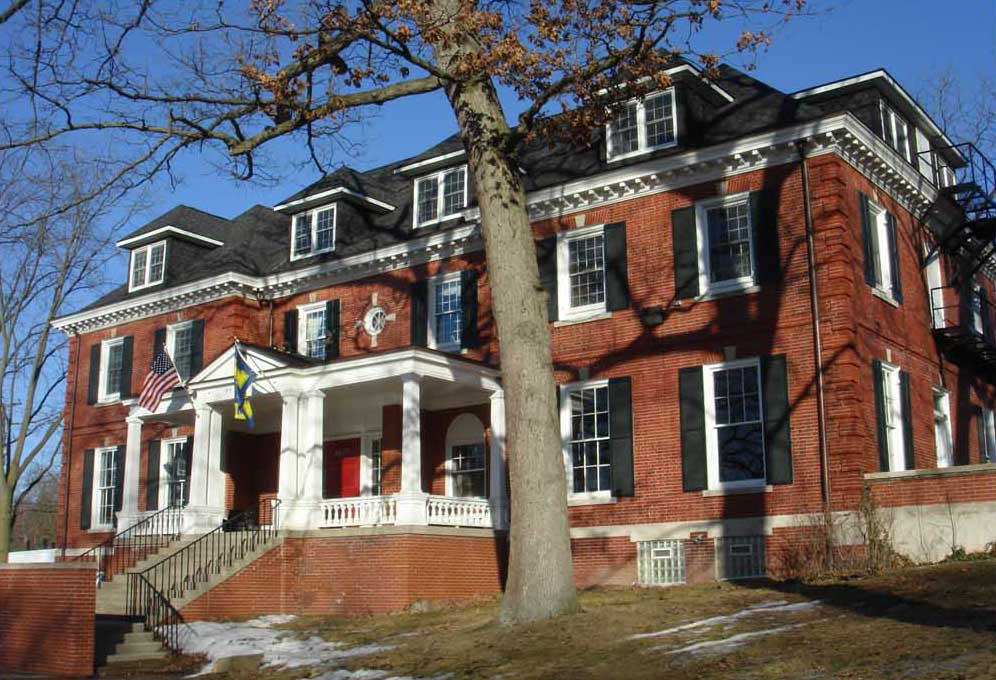
- Interactive map of the Michigan Alpha Chapter House of Phi Delta Theta area

General information
- Type: Fraternity house
- Architectural style: Georgian Revival style
- Location: 1437 Washtenaw Avenue, Ann Arbor, Michigan, United States
- Opened: 1903
- Renovated: 2000s
- Owner: Michigan Alpha chapter of Phi Delta Theta

Design and construction
- Architect: Alpheus W. Chittenden
- Main contractor: Koch brothers
- Designations: Michigan Register of Historic Places

The Phi Delta Theta House located at 1437 Washtenaw Ave., Ann Arbor, Michigan, is a splendid example of Georgian Revival architecture. The house, finished in 1903, is on the Michigan Register of Historic Places. It is located near the southeast edge of the University of Michigan's Central Campus.

== History ==
The Michigan Alpha chapter built their Georgian Revival style house between 1902 and 1903 as the fraternity's first permanent house on campus. Phi Delta Theta was the seventh fraternity established at the University of Michigan, installed on November 28, 1864. The house was built with funds from alumni, faculty members and active chapter members.

The three-story house was designed by Alpheus W. Chittenden and built by Koch brothers construction firm. It replaced a mansion built by University of Michigan Librarian Andrew Ten Brook in the 1860s. The house was constructed with red brick on a raised foundation featuring a projecting central portico entrance supported with doric columns. The house has thirteen bedrooms and can accommodate more than thirty residents.

On March 22, 1983, the Michigan State Historic Preservation Office placed the house on the Michigan Register of Historic Places. The fraternity house has significance as an early Georgian Revival style residence and recalls one of the University of Michigan's oldest social fraternities.

In the early 2000s, the Michigan Alpha chapter spent approximately $500,000 to completely renovate the house and restore its historic integrity. Elements of the interior finish were modified following major fires in the early 1970s and building code upgrades during the recent renovation; however, most of the original floor plan remains unchanged.
