= Dexter Township, Michigan =

- Civil township
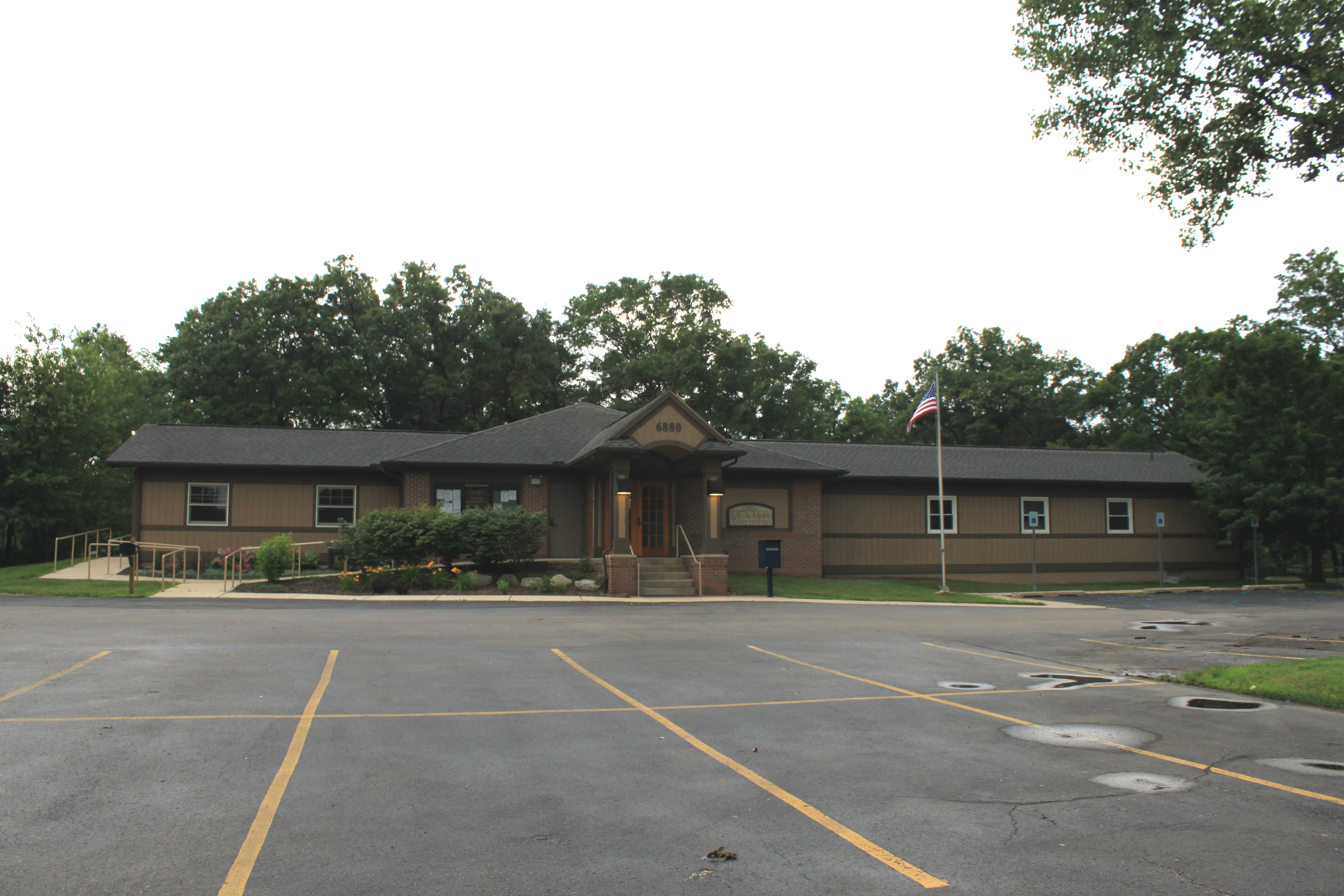
- Township Hall on Dexter–Pinckney Road

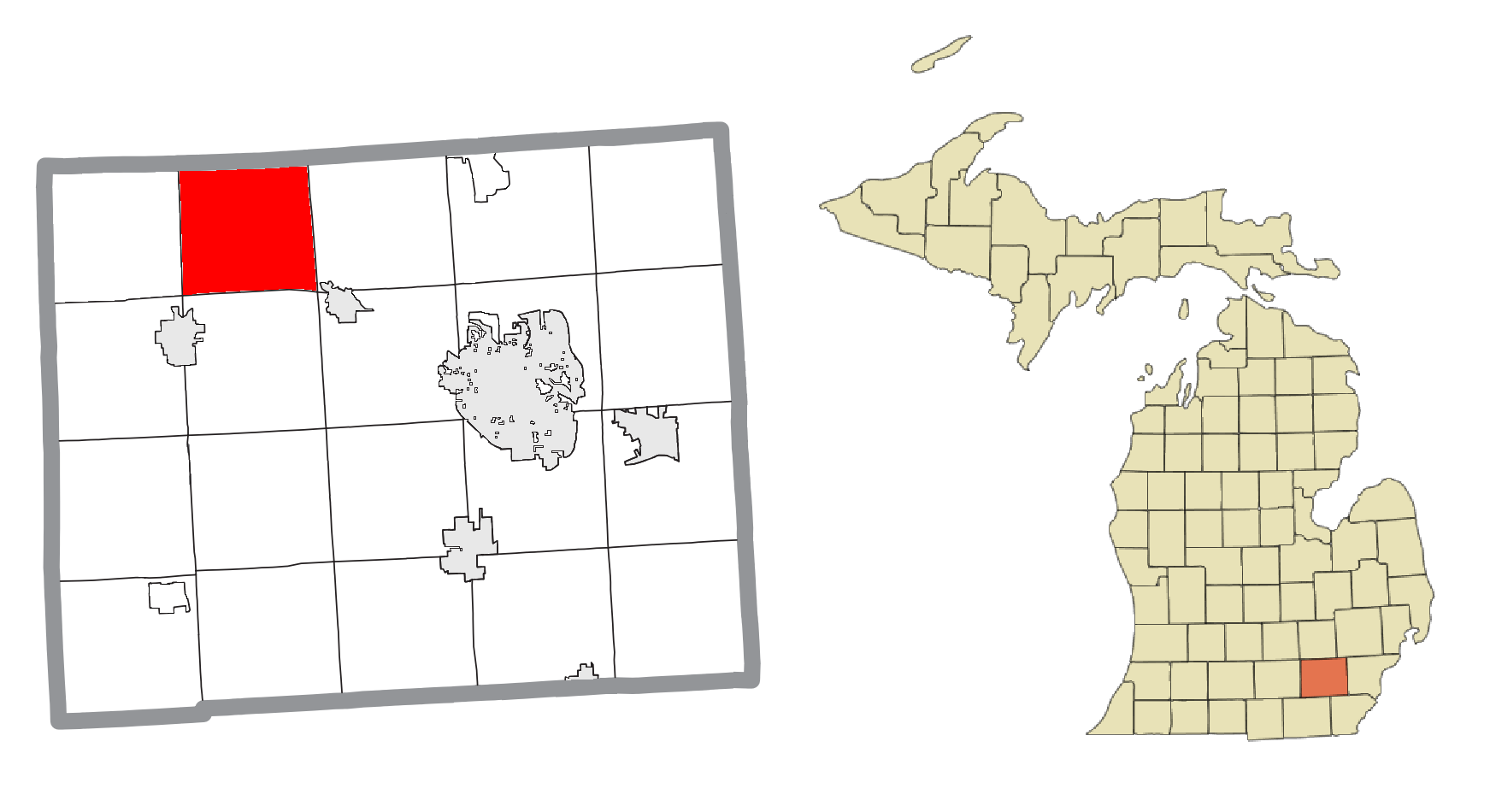
- Location within Washtenaw County

- Location within the state of Michigan
- Coordinates: 42°24′09″N 83°57′04″W
- Country: United States
- State: Michigan
- County: Washtenaw
- Established: 1827

Government
  - Supervisor: Lonnie Scott
  - Clerk: Michelle Stamboulellis

Area
  - Total: 33.17 sq mi (85.91 km^{2})
  - Land: 30.36 sq mi (78.63 km^{2})
  - Water: 2.81 sq mi (7.28 km^{2})
- Elevation: 899 ft (274 m)

Population (2020)
  - Total: 6,696
  - Density: 220.6/sq mi (85.16/km^{2})
- Time zone: UTC-5 (Eastern (EST))
  - Summer (DST): UTC-4 (EDT)
- ZIP code(s): 48118 (Chelsea); 48130 (Dexter); 48137 (Gregory); 48169 (Pinckney)
- Area code: 734
- FIPS code: 26-22180
- GNIS feature ID: 1626184
- Website: Official website

Dexter Township is a civil township of Washtenaw County in the U.S. state of Michigan. The population was 6,696 at the 2020 census. The city of Dexter is located to the southeast but does not border the township, and the two are administered autonomously.

== Communities ==
- Dover is an unincorporated community located within the township at 42°24′09″N 83°54′39″W. Dover was settled along the Huron River in 1833 and was given a post office named Base Lake on August 30, 1849. It was also referred to as Dover Mills. In 1882, the Birkett Manufacturing Company established in Dover, and the community's name and post office changed to Birkett on March 29, 1882. The post office closed on October 14, 1893.
- Hudson Mills is an unincorporated community located within the township at 42°23′14″N 83°55′01″W. The community also lends its name to the Hudson Mills Metropark. Hudson Mills is a designated Michigan State Historic Site.
- North Lake is a historic settlement that existed within the township along the lake of the same name. A post office under the name Louisville opened on January 21, 1835 and was renamed North Lake on April 18, 1836. The post office closed on May 26, 1847.
- Silver Lake is a former settlement within the township. A rural post office operated here from August 15, 1843 until September 3, 1856. It was located along the lake of the same name, which is now part of Pinckney State Recreation Area.
- Sterling is a historic settlement that was established en route between Ann Arbor and Ionia and received a post office on January 15, 1836. The post office operated until August 12, 1845.

== Geography ==
According to the U.S. Census Bureau, the township has a total area of 33.17 square miles (85.91 km^{2}), of which 30.36 square miles (78.63 km^{2}) is land and 2.81 square miles (7.28 km^{2}) (8.47%) is water.

The township contains numerous lakes, and the Huron River flows along the eastern border. Portions of Pinckney State Recreation Area and Hudson Mills Metropark are within the township. The Border-to-Border Trail runs through the township.

== Demographics ==
As of the census of 2020, there were around 6,696 people and 2,644 households residing in the township. The population density was 221 people per square mile. There were 2,860 housing units at an average density of 94.39 per square mile (36.44/km^{2}). The racial makeup of the township was 91.11% White, 0.62% African American, 0.11% Native American, 1.0% Asian, 0.28% from other races, and 4.15% from two or more races. Hispanic or Latino of any race were 2.64% of the population.

There were 2,644 households, out of which 30.6% had children under the age of 18 living with them (810), 62.3% were married couples living together (1647), 16.5% had a female householder with no spouse or partner present, and 21.1% had a male householder with no spouse or partner present. 29.3% of all households were made up of individuals, and 37% (981) had someone living alone who was 65 years of age or older. The average household size was 2.50 and the average family size was 2.87.

In the township the population was spread out, with 21.3% under the age of 18, 6.4% from 18 to 24, 26.5% from 15 to 44, 34.9% from 45 to 64, and 19.4% who were 65 years of age or older. The median age was 52 years. For every 100 females, there were 117.8 males.

The median income for a household in the township was $124,088, and the median income for a family was $137,163. The per capita income for the township was $58,495. About 5.9% of the population were below the poverty line, including 2.4% of those under age 18 and 1.4% of those age 65 or over. 54.9% have attained a Bachelor's Degree or higher, 28.6% have a graduate or professional degree.

== Education ==
Dexter Township is served by three public school districts. The majority of the township is served by Dexter Community School District in the nearby city of Dexter. The western portion of the township is served by Chelsea School District in Chelsea. A very small northern portion of the township is served by Pinckney Community Schools to the north in Livingston County.

== Images ==
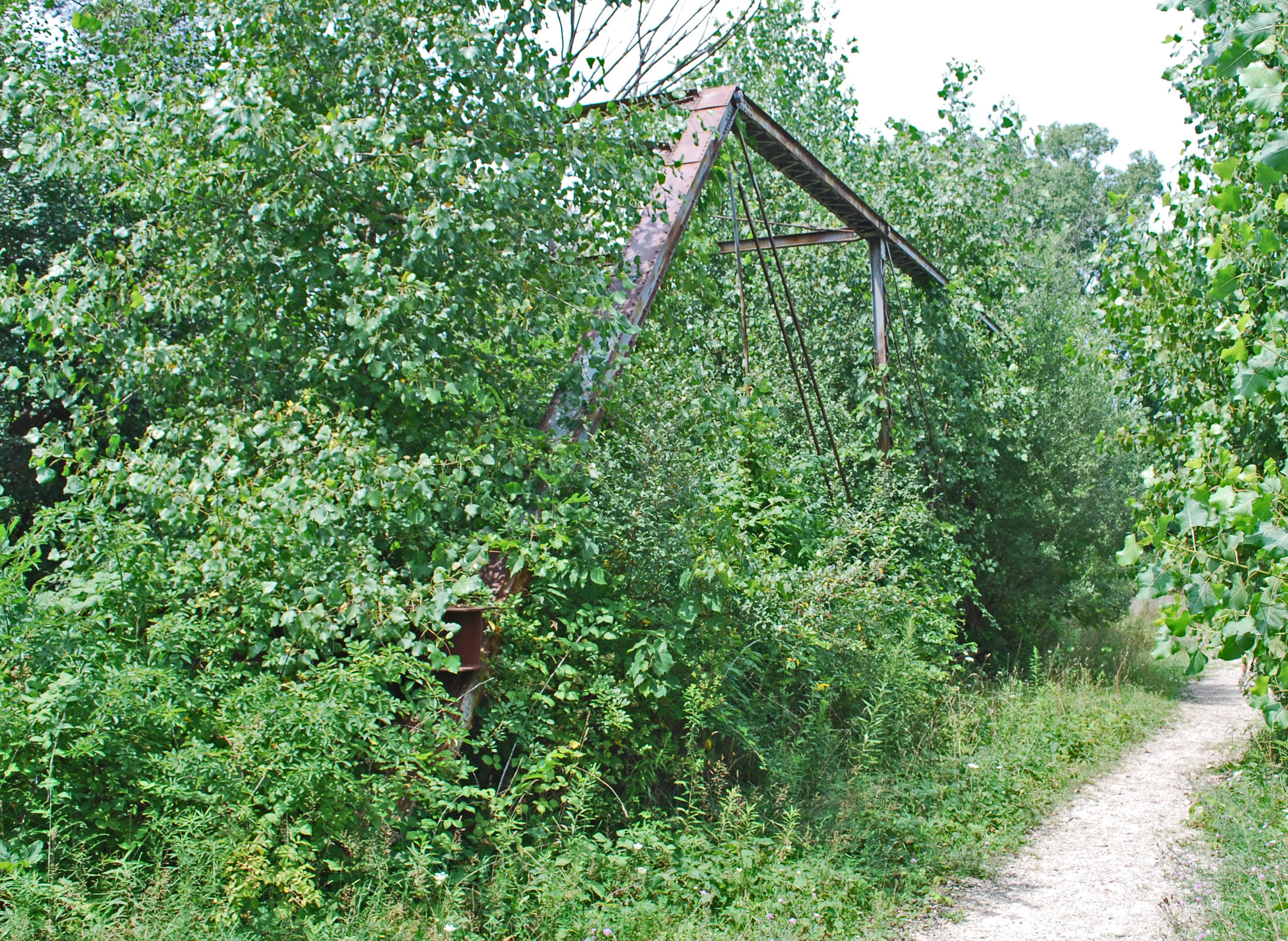
Historic Bell Road Bridge

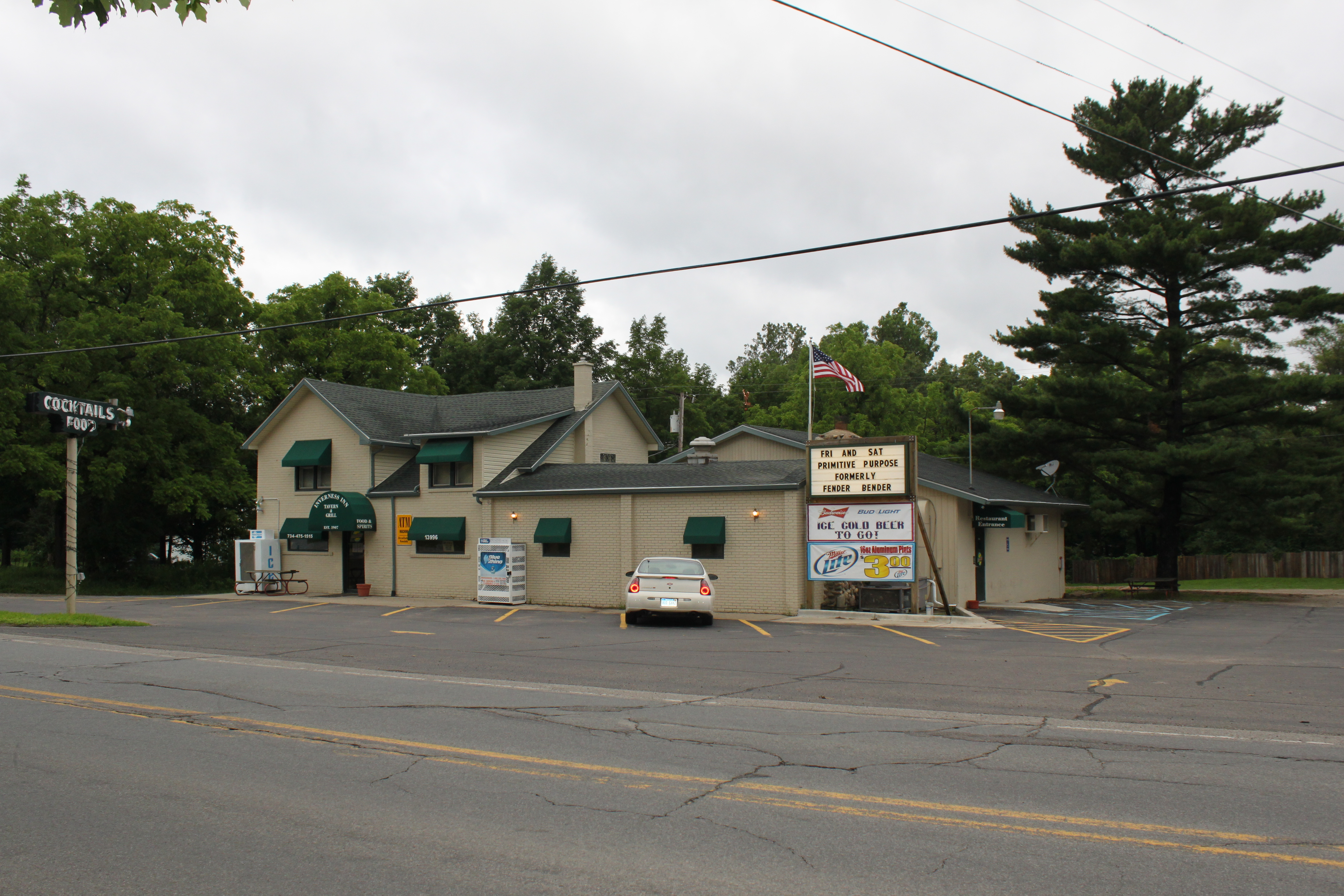
Inverness Inn on N. Territorial Road

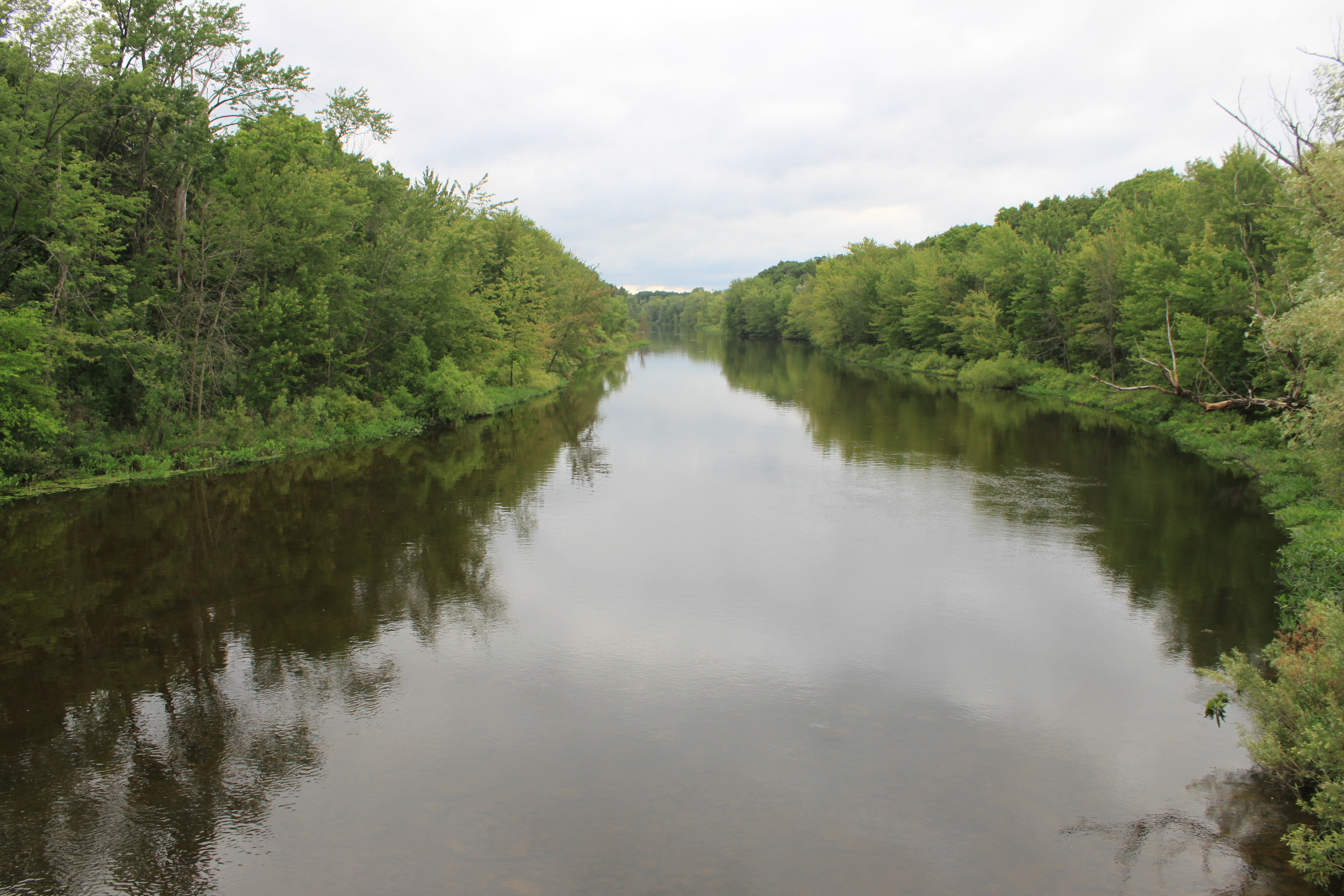
Huron River flowing through the township
