= Dixboro United Methodist Church =

Historic church in Michigan, United States

- U.S. National Register of Historic Places
- Michigan State Historic Site
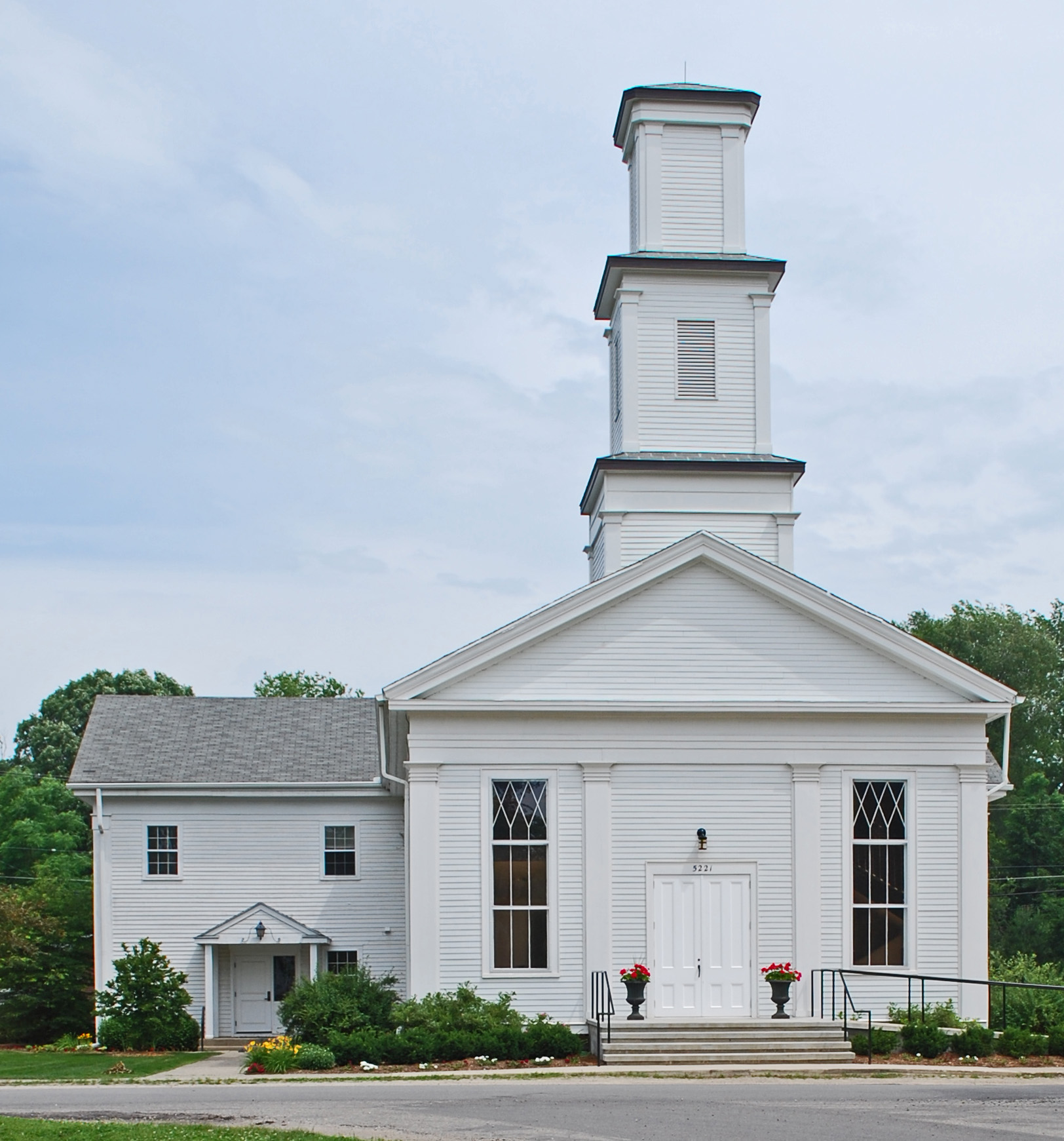
- The church in 2010
- Interactive map of Dixboro United Methodist Church
- Location: 5221 Church St., Dixboro, Michigan
- Coordinates: 42°18′48″N 83°39′21″W
- Area: less than one acre
- Built: 1858
- Built by: E. W. Ford
- Architect: Abraham Cooper
- Architectural style: Greek Revival
- NRHP reference No.: 72000665

Significant dates
- Added to NRHP: March 16, 1972
- Designated MSHS: October 1, 1971

The Dixboro United Methodist Church is a historic church located at 5221 Church Street in Dixboro, Superior Township, Michigan. It was added to the National Register of Historic Places in 1972 and designated a Michigan State Historic Site in 1971. It is significant as a nearly unaltered example of a mid-19th century Greek Revival-style church designed by a professional architect.

== History ==
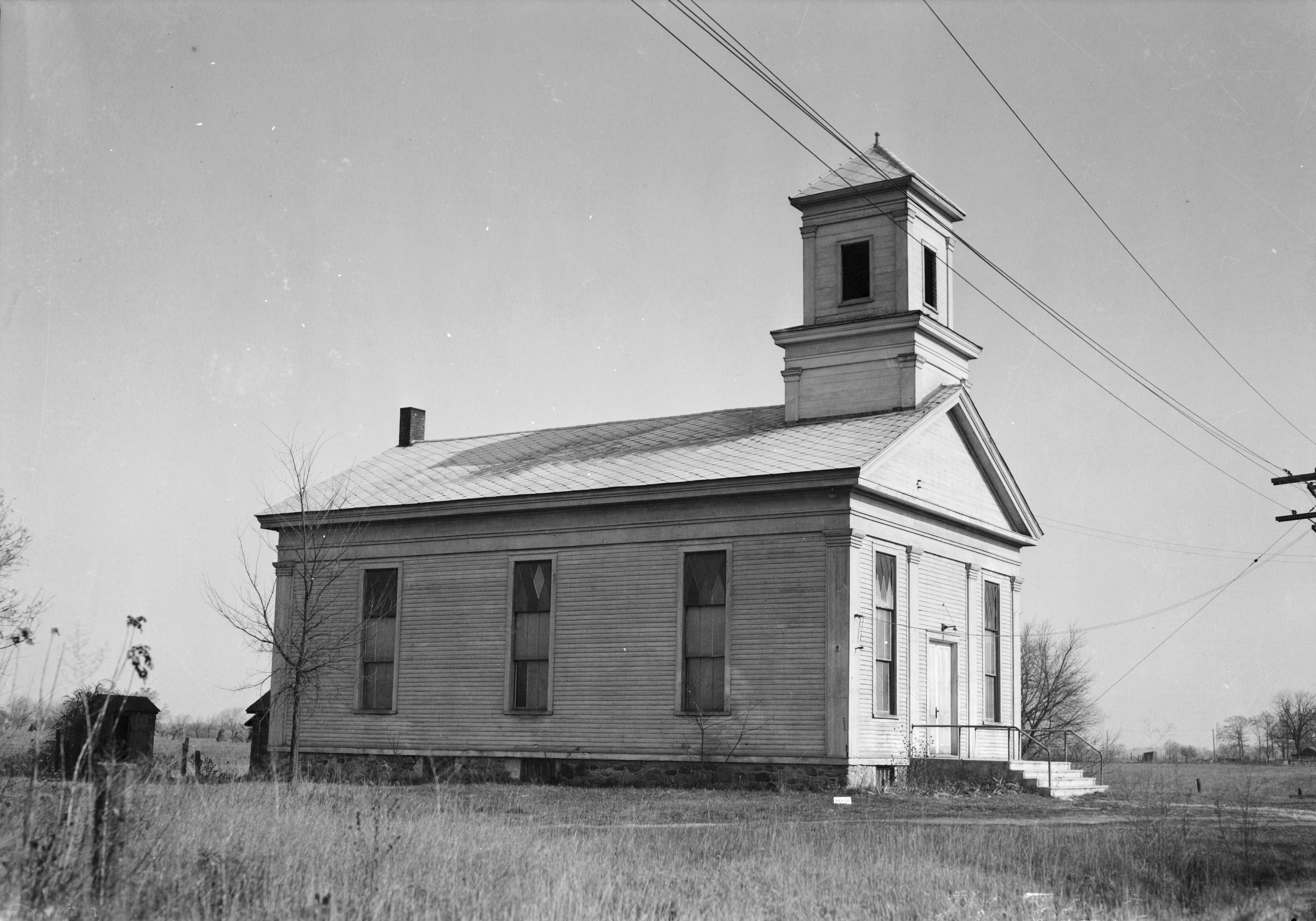
Side view of the church in 1936

The first Methodist services in the village of Dixboro were performed in 1828. For the next 30 years, services were performed sporadically by circuit riders. Finally, in 1857, a group of Dixboro citizens met, elected a Board of Trustees, and authorized the building of a church for a price not to exceed $2500. The Board hired Ypsilanti, Michigan architect Abraham Cooper to design the church and Saline builder E. W. Ford to construct it. The building was completed in 1858, for a total cost of $2241.

In 1920, a basement was dug underneath the church and a furnace installed. The church was documented by the Historic American Buildings Survey in 1936, which created drawings and photographs of the building. In 1950-51, a wing was added and the cupola was shortened. In 1969, a second wing was added. Finally, in 1997-98, the structure was completely renovated, and the cupola was restored to its original height. The church is still used for weekly services.

== Description ==
The Dixboro United Methodist Church is a single-story, frame, Greek Revival structure topped with a square cupola and belfry. It is clad in clapboard siding. The front facade is divided into four bays by Doric pilasters, and a pedimented portico shelters the entrance. The entrance is flanked by triple-hung sash windows, which continue on each side of the church.
