= Ladies' Literary Club Building =

- U.S. National Register of Historic Places
- U.S. Historic district – Contributing property
- Michigan State Historic Site
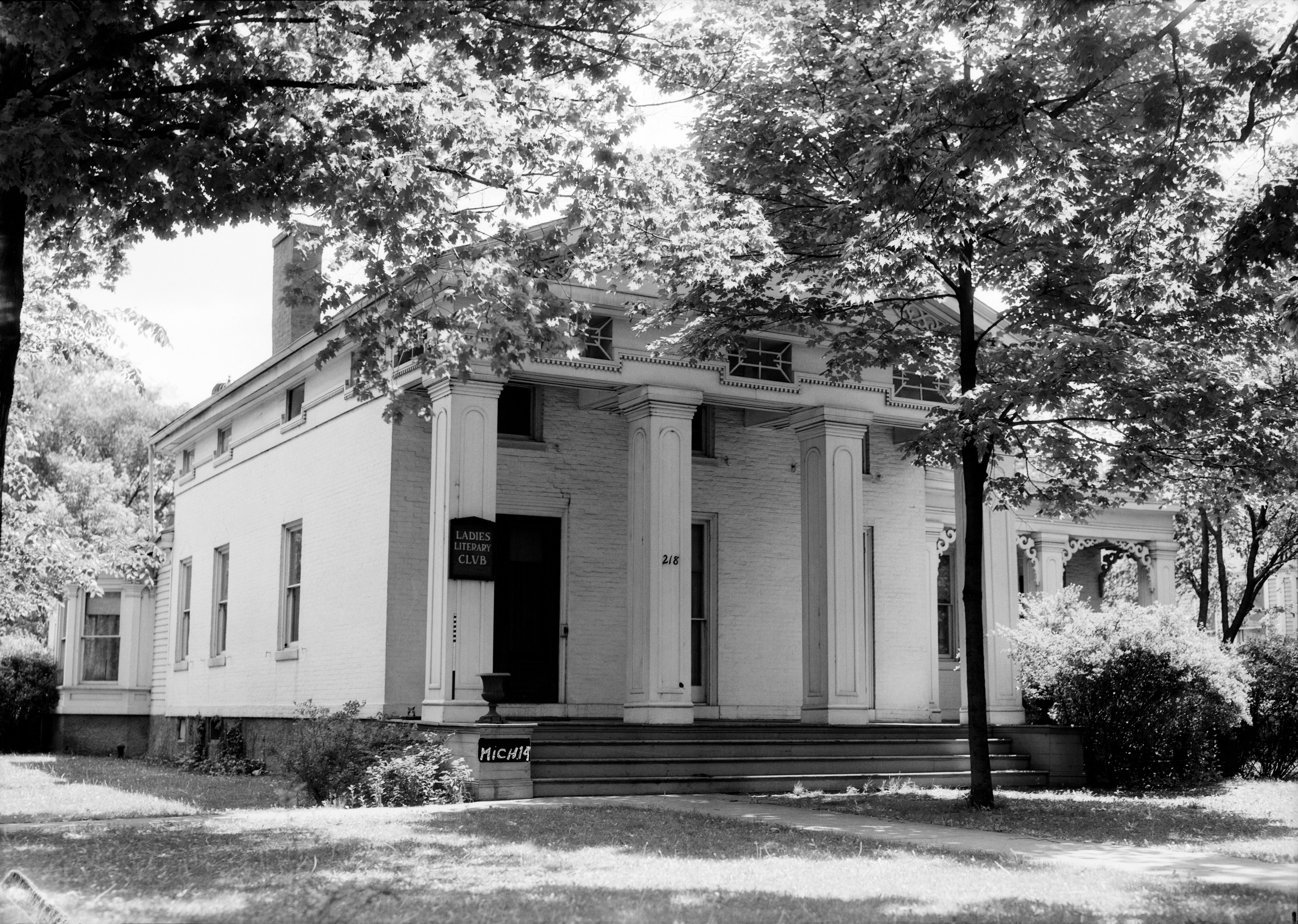
- Front elevation, 1936

- Location within Michigan Location within the United States
- Interactive map
- Location: 218 N. Washington St., Ypsilanti, Michigan
- Coordinates: 42°14′40″N 83°36′51″W
- Area: less than one acre
- Built: 1843
- Built by: Arden Ballard
- Architectural style: Greek Revival
- Part of: Ypsilanti Historic District (ID78001515)
- NRHP reference No.: 72000666

Significant dates
- Added to NRHP: March 16, 1972
- Designated MSHS: May 12, 1965

The Ladies' Literary Club Building, also known as the William M. Davis House or the Arden H. Ballard House, was built as a private home, and is currently used as the meeting place for the Ladies' Literary Club. It is located at 218 North Washington Street in Ypsilanti, Michigan. It was designated a Michigan State Historic Site in 1965 and listed on the National Register of Historic Places in 1972.

== History ==
The Ladies' Literary Club Building was built in approximately 1843 as a home for William M. Davis. It was likely designed by Arden H. Ballard and built by his firm of Norris, Cross, and Ballard. At some point, it was sold to Elijah Grant, who operated a local dry goods store. When Grant died in 1851, his wife Mary and son Edward continued to live in the house. Mary died in 1883, and Edward continued to live in the house, his fortune slowly diminishing through a series of bad investments. He eventually began selling the furnishings, and in 1913 sold the house itself. The Ladies' Literary Club purchased the property to use as their meeting hall.

The interior of the building was later refurbished under the oversight of architect Emil Lorch. In the 1930s, Lorch helped the structure become a part of the Historic American Buildings Survey "because of its age and architectural interest as being worthy of most careful preservation for future generations." More remodeling was done in 1955, and an addition was built to the rear of the building in 1971–72.

== Ladies' Literary Club ==
The Ladies' Literary Club of Ypsilanti was founded in 1878 by Sarah Smith Putnam, with 17 members. By the end of its first year, they had expanded to 37 members. The club functioned as a learning society. Since learning opportunities for women remained limited, club members developed courses of study in various historical topics from the French Revolution to early Greek and Roman societies. The club membership quickly expanded, and they held bi-monthly meetings at the homes of members or in the library. However, by 1910, the club had grown large enough that they needed to rent rooms in the Masonic temple. When the Davis House was put up for sale in 1913, the Club purchased it for $3000. The first meeting in the house was in October 1914.

The club's mission, as stated by the group, is "the mutual enrichment of its members through fellowship in an environment that encourages learning." In 1918, a clause was added to the mission statement that emphasized their goals to better the greater Ypsilanti area community through education opportunities, preserving the historic house they hold meetings in, and generally supporting women's efforts. The group has been very active in providing benefits to women and girls in Ypsilanti, partnering with organizations like the American Red Cross and sponsoring a Girl Scouts troop, among other endeavors, in order to further these goals. One of the club’s members, Susan H. Sayre, was the first woman to be elected mayor of Ypsilanti, and served from 1966 to 1967.

Despite its focus on education for women due to their exclusion from society, the club is rather exclusive. The group originally designated themselves as a "ladies'" club instead of a "women's'" because this designated their members as higher status, whereas the term "woman" at the time would have been associated with the servant class, and have a strong conviction towards traditional ways of living. Even today, the club is invite-only, and requires a sponsorship from a sitting member to join, allowing the club to remain private. Still, changes have been made to make the club more modern; in 1988, members began referring to one another by their first names instead of "Mrs." and the name of their husbands. Other modernizing efforts include banning smoking on the premises and creating accessible ramps into the building.

== Description ==
The Ladies' Literary Club Building is a 1 1/2-story rectangular brick Greek Revival house. The temple front boasts a wooden tetrastyle Doric portico with a triangular pediment above. A single story wooden wing sits to one side. Grills are placed along the frieze.

== Gallery ==
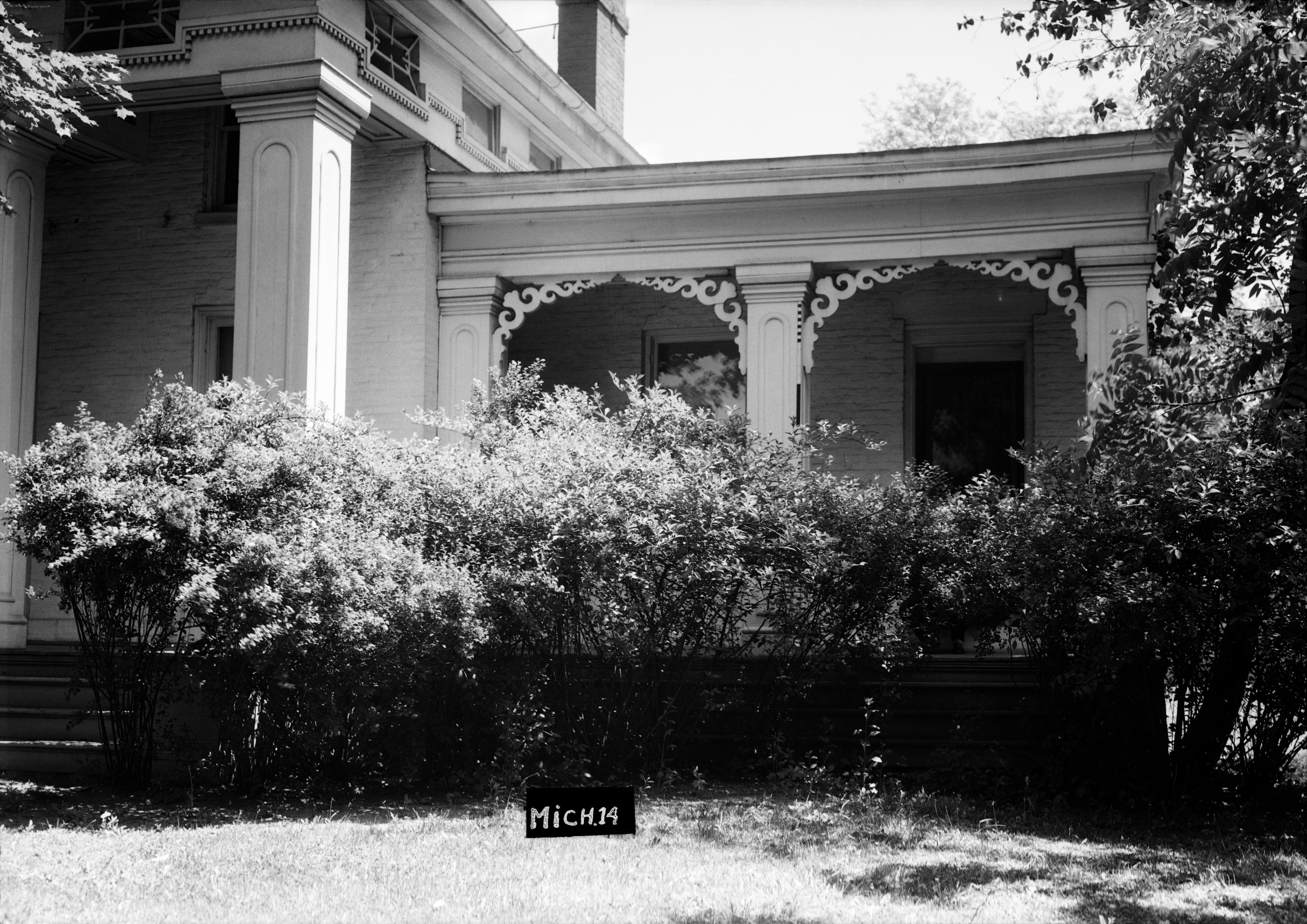
Detail of portico and south wing, 1936

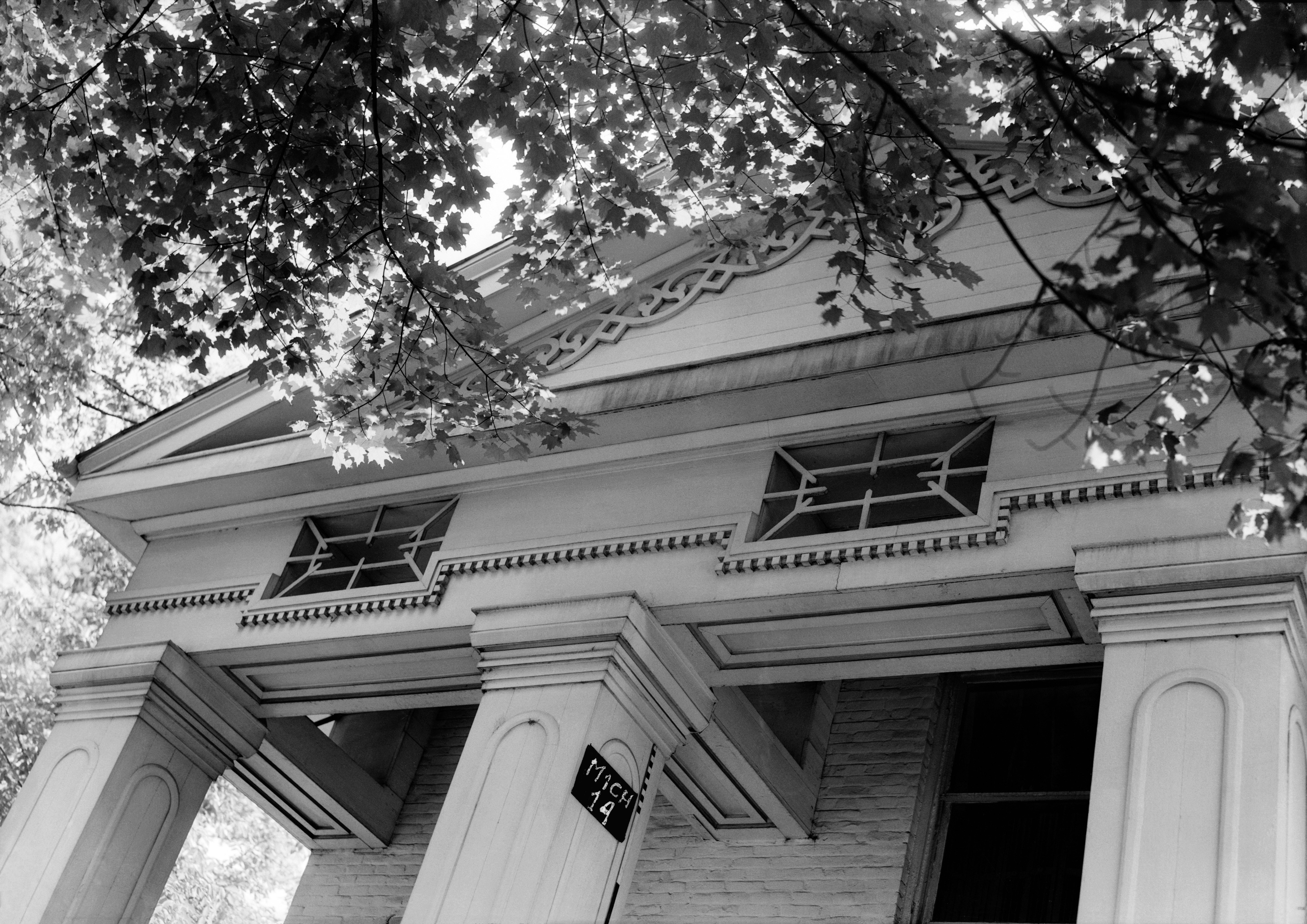
Detail of front portico, 1936

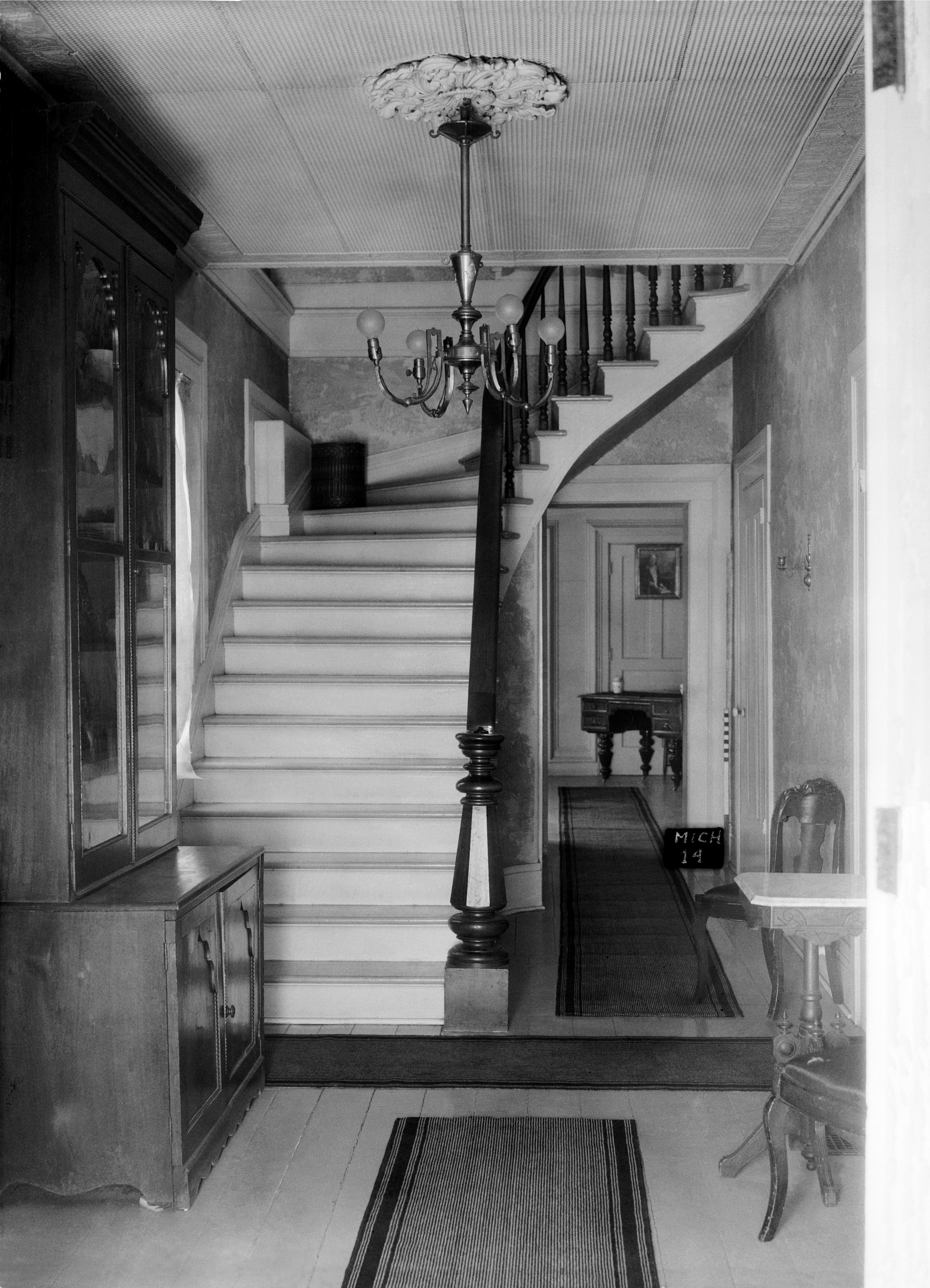
Main stairway, 1936

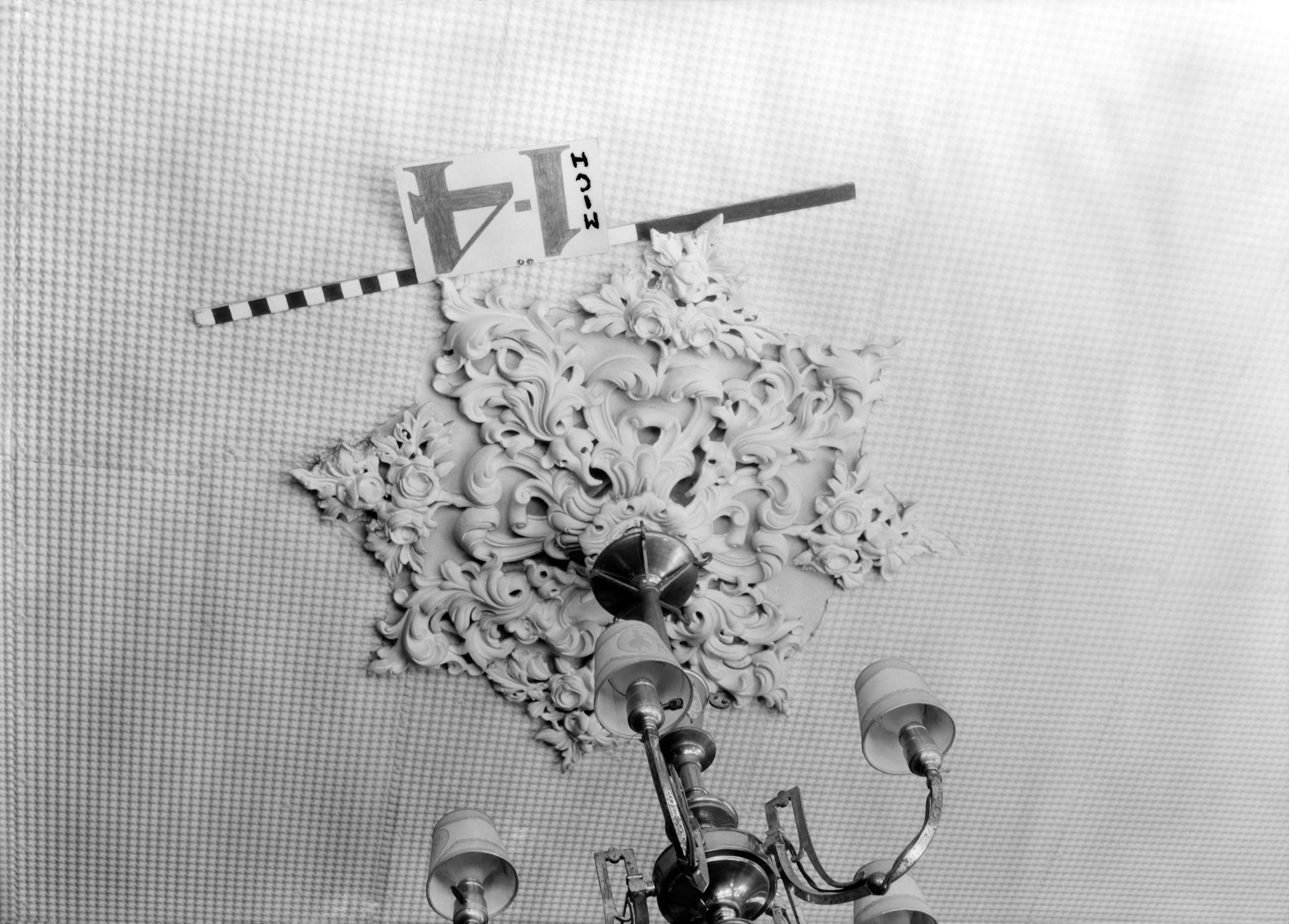
Detail of chandelier medallion, 1936
