= William H. Davenport House =

- U.S. National Register of Historic Places
- Michigan State Historic Site
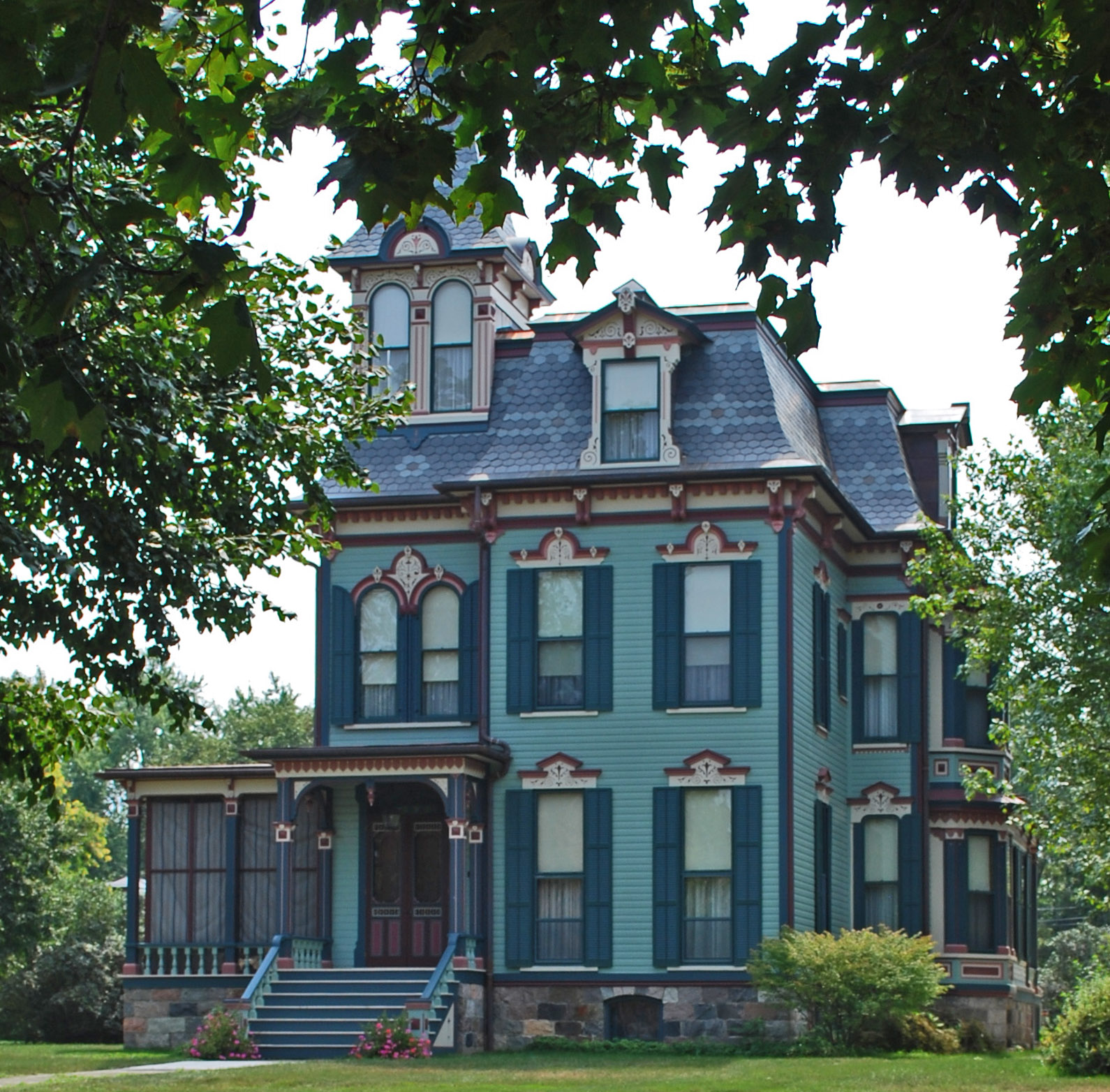

- Location within Michigan Location within the United States
- Interactive map
- Location: 300 E. Michigan Ave., Saline, Michigan
- Coordinates: 42°10′11″N 83°46′31″W
- Area: 9 acres (3.6 ha)
- Built: 1875
- Built by: Sears Bros. Practical Roofers (roof)
- Architect: William Scott
- Architectural style: Second Empire
- NRHP reference No.: 75000964
- Added to NRHP: March 3, 1975

The William H. Davenport House, also known as the Davenport-Curtis House, is a single-family home located at 300 East Michigan Avenue in Saline, Michigan. It was listed on the National Register of Historic Places in 1975.

== History ==
William H. Davenport was born in New York state in 1826, and arrived in Michigan with his family the next year. Davenport moved to Saline at the age of twelve after his father's death, and began working as a mercantile clerk. In 1851 he married Zilpha Parsons, and that same year partnered with H. J. Miller to open a general store. In 1853 he bought out Miller's interest and, over the following years, Davenport became Saline's most prominent merchant.

In 1875, Davenport hired Detroit architect William Scott to design this house. The Davenports selected many of the furnishings for the house from manufacturer displays at the 1876 Philadelphia Centennial Exposition. In 1883, Davenport abandoned his general store, and in 1885 he opened a bank, which became publicly owned in 1902. Davenport lived in this house until his death in 1909. The house remained in the Davenport family until 1930, when family friend Carl Alward Curtiss inherited the house and its antique furnishings.

== Description ==
The Davenport House is a Second Empire mansion, located by itself on a city block at the entrance to Saline, surrounded by mature trees. The house is a two-and-a-half-story frame structure with a slate-covered mansard roof and corner tower. It sits on a cut stone foundation, and the exterior contains ornate bracketry, corbels, lintels, and dormers. Two original carriage barns with slate mansard roofs stand behind the house.

On the interior, the woodwork is made from the finest hardwoods - walnut, butternut, and maple - throughout the house. The house still contains antiques purchased at the 1876 Philadelphia Exposition of 1876. The full-length windows are topped with carved interior cornices and the ceilings are decorated with sculptured plaster.
