= Cobblestone Farm and Museum =

Historic house in Michigan, United States

- Dr. Benajah Ticknor House
- U.S. National Register of Historic Places
- Michigan State Historic Site
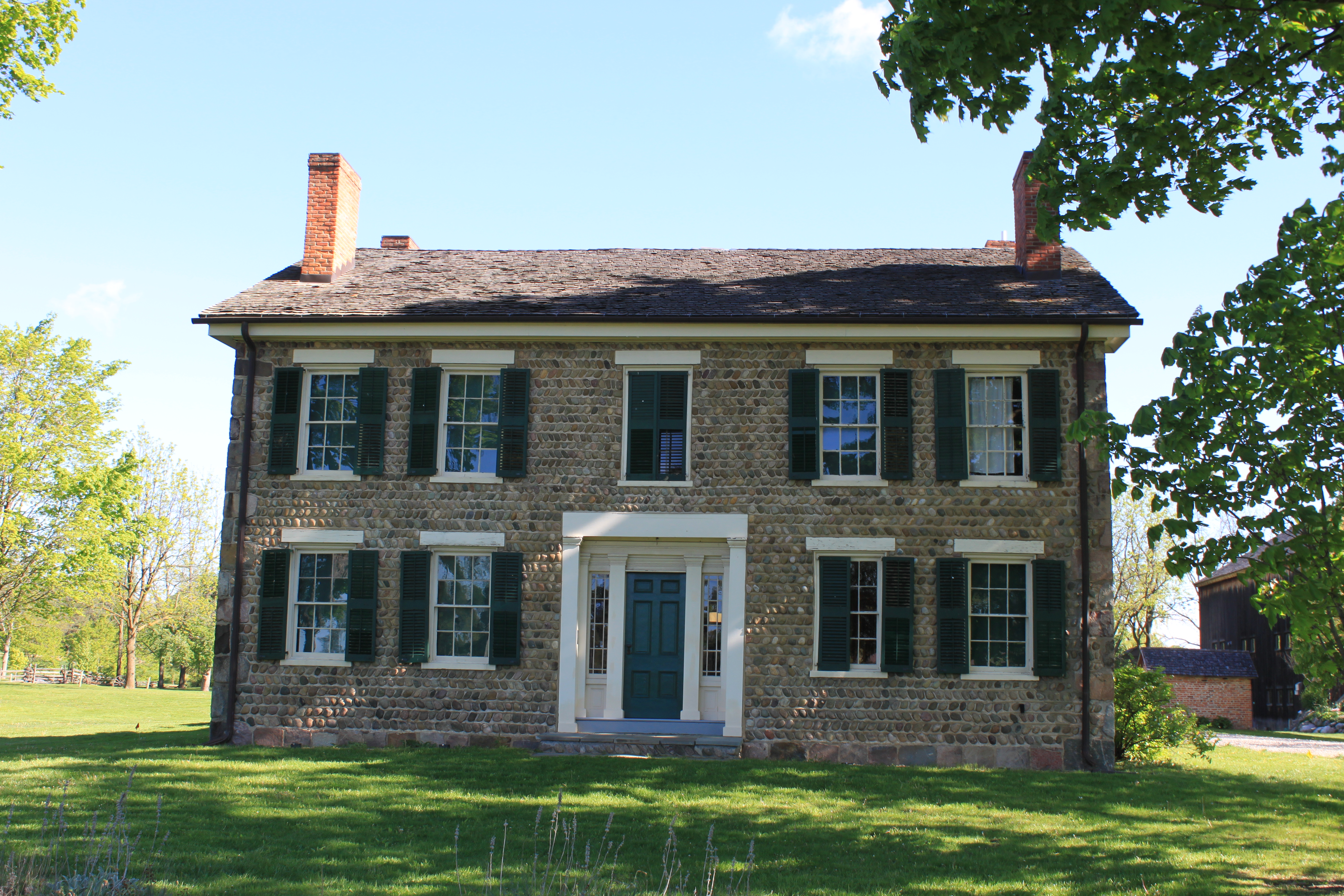
- Front view

- Location within Michigan Location within the United States
- Interactive map showing the Cobblestone Museum’s location
- Location: 2781 Packard Rd., Ann Arbor, Michigan
- Coordinates: 42°14′42″N 83°42′38″W
- Area: 4 acres (1.6 ha)
- Built: 1835
- Built by: Steven Mills
- Architectural style: Cobblestone construction, Classical Revival
- NRHP reference No.: 72000662

Significant dates
- Added to NRHP: November 21, 1972
- Designated MSHS: May 17, 1973

The Cobblestone Farm and Museum, which includes the Dr. Benajah Ticknor House (also known as the Ticknor-Campbell House) is an historical museum located at 2781 Packard Road in Ann Arbor Michigan. The museum gets its name from the cobblestone used to build the farmhouse. It was listed on the National Register of Historic Places in 1972 and designated a Michigan State Historic Site in 1973.

== History ==
The site of the Cobblestone Farm had been a farm as far back as 1824 and remained an operating farm well into the late 20th century. Ezra Maynard originally cleared the land on which the farm now sits. In 1835, Maynard sold the property to Heman Ticknor, who purchased it on behalf of his brother, naval surgeon Dr. Benajah Ticknor. That same year, Heman Ticknor constructed a small frame house on the property. In 1844, Benajah Ticknor built the cobblestone farmhouse, probably with the help of builder Steven Mills. Benajah Ticknor traveled extensively on assignments with the Navy, but retired to his farm in 1854 with his wife Getia (or Gessie) and two adopted daughters. Benajah Ticknor died in 1858, at which time his extensive medical library was donated to the University of Michigan.

In 1860, Horace Booth purchased the farm from Getia Ticknor. Horace and his son Nelson farmed and improved the property, adding the fountain that still exists today. In 1881, William Campbell purchased the farm, and he and his descendants continued to farm the property until 1955. The family continued to own it until 1972, when the city of Ann Arbor purchased the property for use as a museum.

Restored to its mid-nineteenth-century appearance, the farm today serves to provide a glimpse into the pioneer history of the surrounding community. The site was acquired by the city of Ann Arbor as a city park and is leased to the Cobblestone Farm Association. In addition to its educational mission, the farm also serves as a venue for festive occasions such as picnics, fairs and weddings.

== Description ==
The Dr. Benajah Ticknor House is a rectangular two-story Classical Revival house with a side-gable roof constructed of cobblestones laid in a herringbone pattern. The center front entrance is flanked by Doric pilasters, and the corners of the house feature stone quoins. The 1 1/2-story frame ell in the rear is the original 1835 house constructed by Heman Ticknor. In the kitchen stands a large fireplace with bake oven and water heater made from hand-hewn brick. In 1924, a fire destroyed some outbuildings. Very few alterations have been done to the building, and both exterior and interior are in essentially original condition. The house was included in a 1933 survey for the Historic American Buildings Survey.

In addition to the cobblestone farmhouse, the Museum property also includes a large barn, tool shed, corn crib, and smokehouse. A c. 1835 log cabin, moved to the property from southeastern Washtenaw County, is also on display.

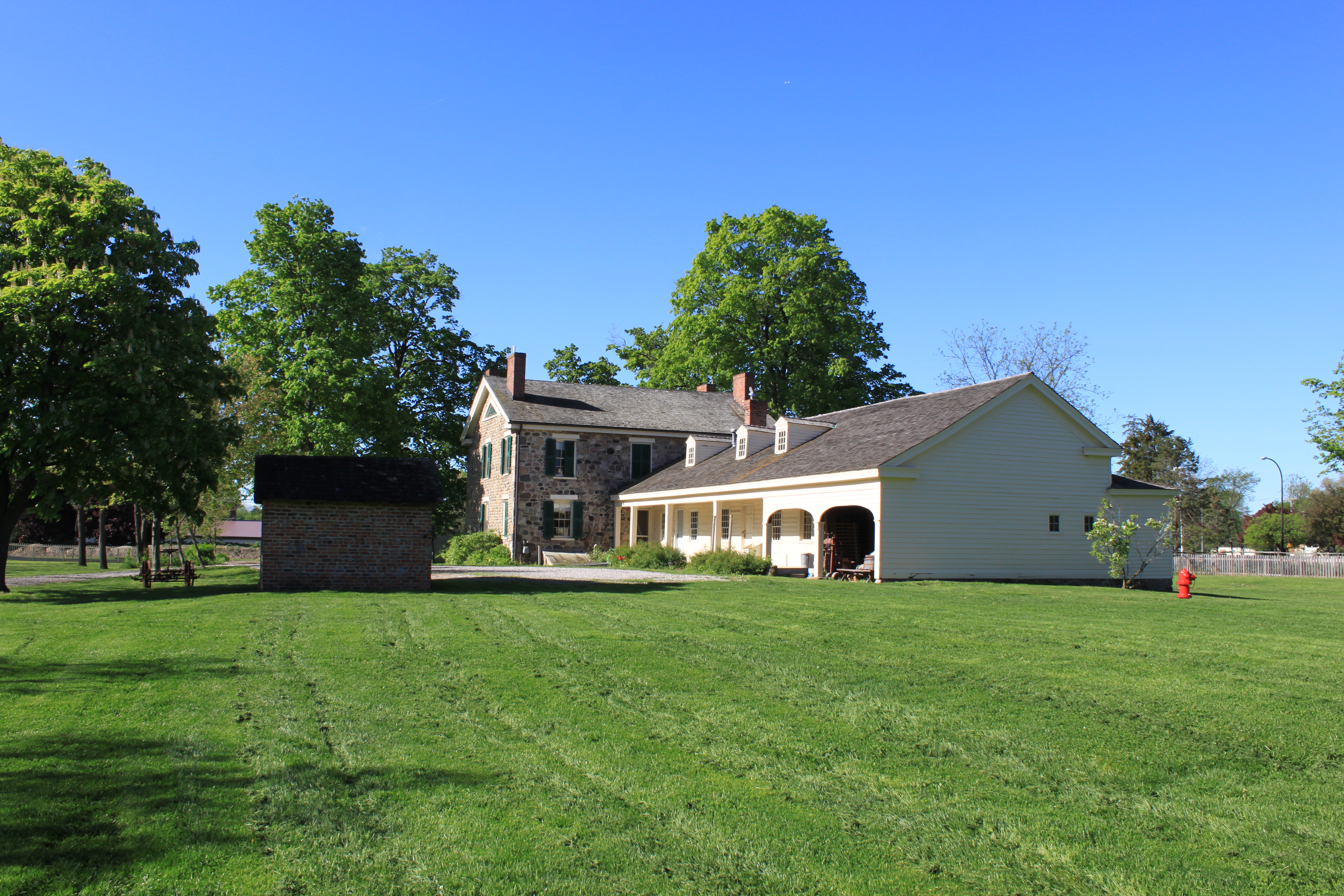
Cobblestone Farm Ticknor-Campbell House, rear view

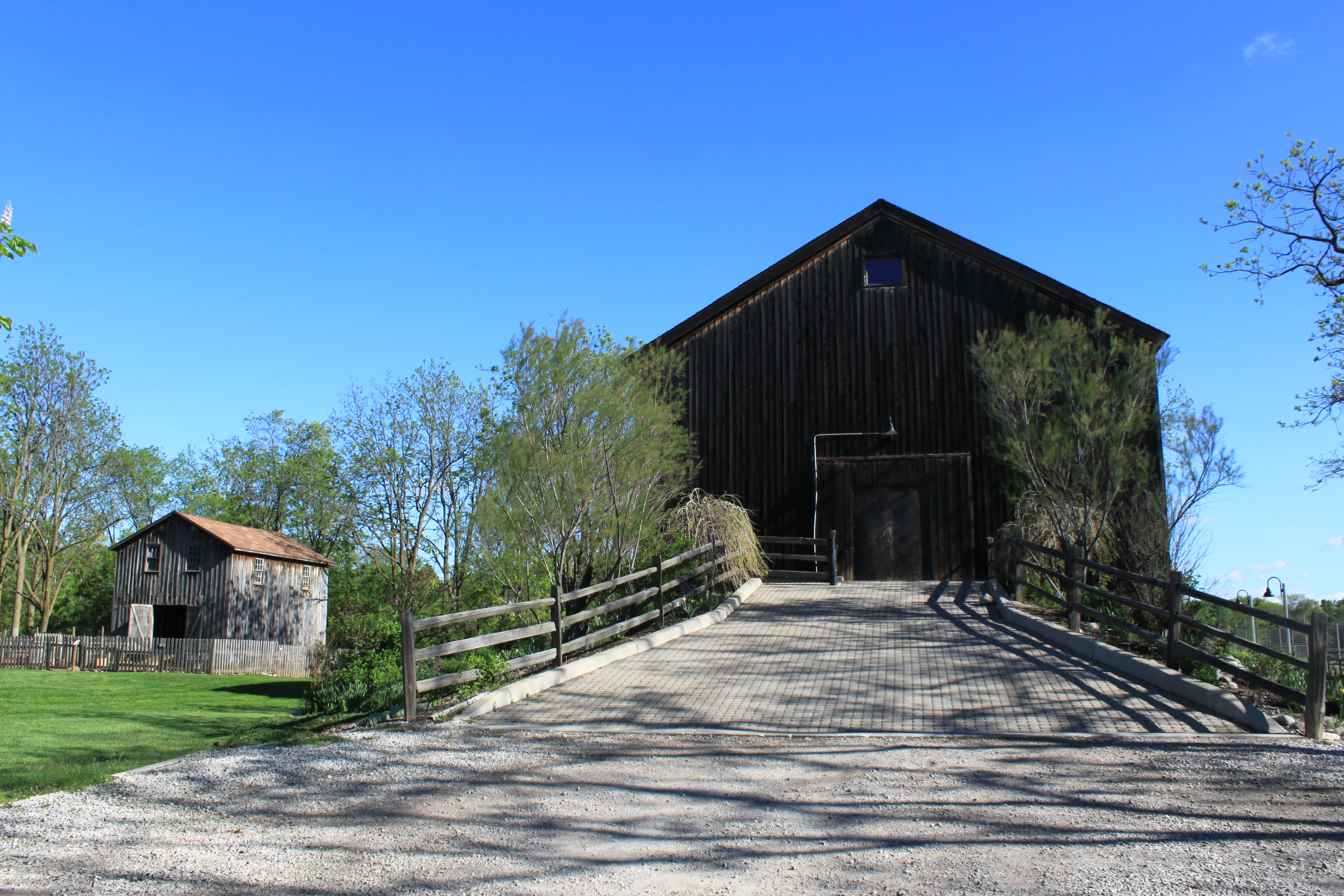
Cobblestone Farm barns

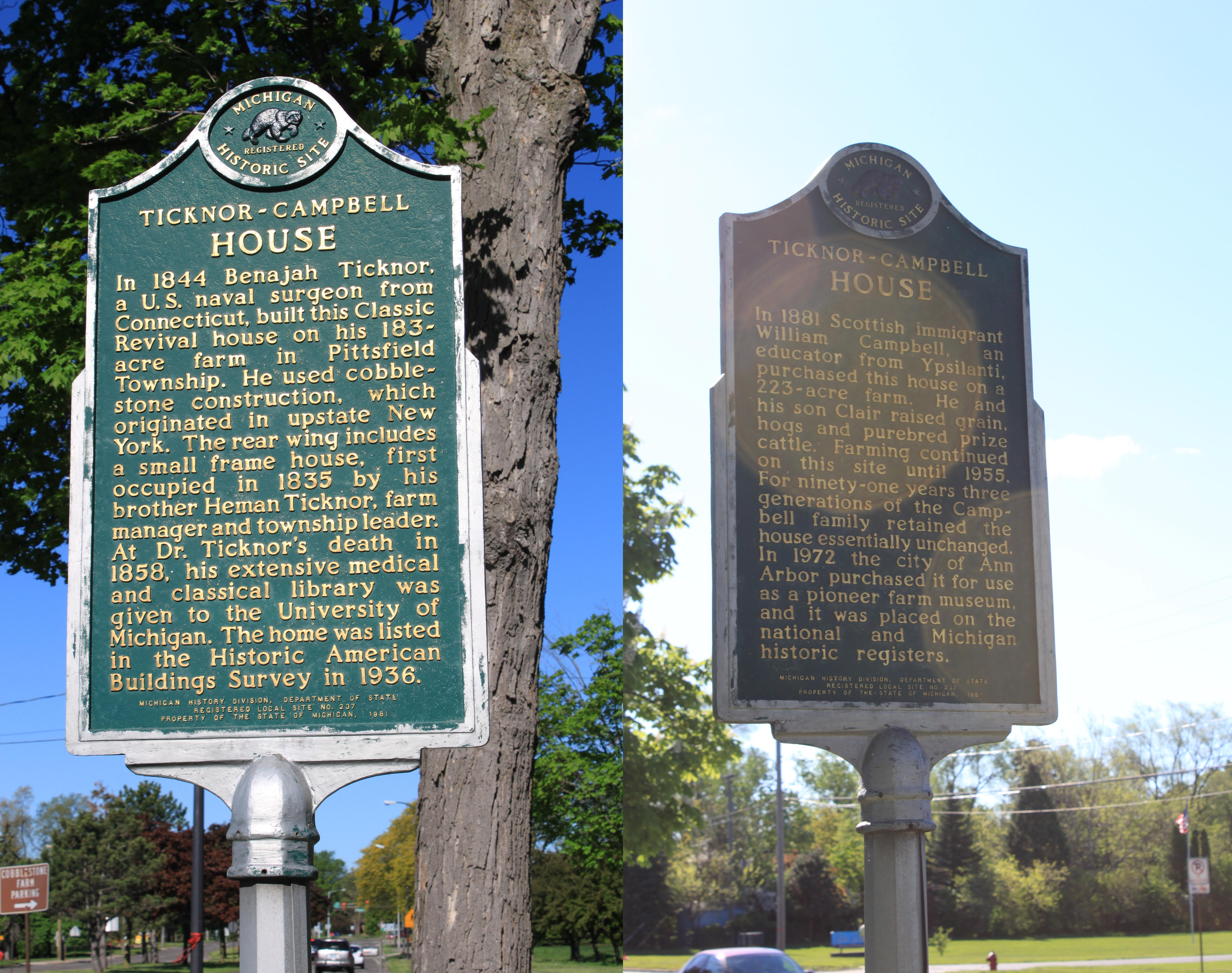
Cobblestone Farm historical marker
