= Craig Rothfeld =

American businessman

- Education: University at Albany, SUNY, New York University Stern School of Business
- Occupation: Prison consultant
- Years active: 2014 – present
- Known for: Prison consulting
- Website: insideoutsideltd.com

Craig Rothfeld is an American prison consultant and former securities industry executive. After serving a prison sentence for financial crimes, he began advising clients on incarceration preparation and reentry. He is known for his work with high-profile clients including Harvey Weinstein, Luigi Mangione, Keith Raniere, Sheff G and "Ketamine Queen" Jasveen Sangha.

== Education ==
Rothfeld earned a Bachelor of Science in Accounting from University at Albany, SUNY in 1993. He obtained a Master of Business Administration in finance and international business from the New York University Stern School of Business.

Rothfeld later completed a Master of Arts in Criminal Justice and a Post Graduate Certification in Criminal Sentencing and Sentencing Advocacy, both from Arizona State University’s Watts College of Public Service & Community Solutions.

== Career and conviction ==
Before his conviction, Rothfeld worked in the financial services industry at organizations such as Arthur Andersen & Co., Sotheby’s, Conectiv, and WJB Capital Group Inc. WJB Capital dissolved in 2011, followed by lawsuits from investors for fraud and breach of contract.

After being indicted by the Manhattan District Attorney in February 2014, Rothfeld submitted a plea deal where he admitted to defrauding investors out of $11 million and he agreed to a custodial sentence between 18 and 54 months in New York State prison. In December 2015, Rothfeld was convicted of grand larceny, tax fraud, and falsifying Financial Industry Regulatory Authority (FINRA) regulatory financial statements.

Rothfeld began serving his prison sentence in Rikers Island. He served approximately 18 months in custody and was released in 2017.

== Prison consultant career ==
Following his release in 2017, Rothfeld founded Inside Outside Ltd., a New York City-based prison consulting firm. Rothfeld describes his work as advocating for the human rights of justiceimpacted people and helping families manage the challenges of incarceration.

Rothfeld has served several high-profile criminal clients including NXIVM founder Keith Raniere, former Trump Organization chief financial officer Allen Weisselberg, rapper Sheff G, and Jasveen Sangha.

Rothfeld is primarily known and referenced publicly in relation to familiarity with the New York prison system, and his work with Luigi Mangione and Harvey Weinstein. Rothfeld was publicly credited with assisting Weinstein when he required urgent medical care while at Rikers Island.

Rothfeld teaches continuing legal education (CLE) courses on sentencing and incarceration for New York bar associations. He presented the association's CLE "The Changing Landscape of the New York State Department of Corrections" at the Brooklyn Bar Association's headquarters, covering the 2025 strike by state correction officers and the ways incarcerated people can qualify for earlier release, such as shock incarceration and good-behavior time allowances. According to the Center for Community Alternatives, he has also taught CLE courses for the New York City Bar Association and the New York State Association of Criminal Defense Lawyers, is an approved 18-B mitigation specialist, and has been retained as a New York expert in a dual-jurisdiction death penalty case. He serves on the board of directors of the Center for Community Alternatives, a New York nonprofit that works on alternatives to incarceration.
