= Zach Schwitzky =

American computer security expert (born 1983)

Zachary Schwitzky
- Born: 1983 (age 42–43)
- Occupation: computer security expert
- Known for: commuting from New Jersey to New York by kayak

Zachary Schwitzky is an American computer security expert. He is also known for his rare choice of commuter vehicle. Schwitzky, who lives in Hoboken, NJ, paddles a kayak to work - weather permitting.

== Academic career ==
Schwitzky earned a bachelor's degree at San Diego State University, where he played on the college's baseball team. He went on to study at Seton Hall University.

== Computer career ==
Schwitzky founded Newlio, a market research firm, in 2012.

Schwitzky would later found Limbik, a firm that uses artificial intelligence to analyze video. Customers who monitor their users' video watching use Limbik's software to automatically classify video recordings. Limbik's customers use Limbik's classifications to serve users new videos that Limbik's software predicts they will like. Limbik's software's analysis performs facial recognition on the videos. CNN quoted Schwitzky briefly summarizing how tricky it could be to determine the gender of individuals through watching video. Schwitzky told CNN that his firm's software had been trained to classify some individuals as "non-binary".

By 2020, Schwitzky was recognized as an expert in computer security. When Ali Soufan, the counter-terrorism expert, and founder of The Soufan Group, became the target of an online hate campaign, Schwitzky was one of the experts hired to analyze the attacks. The New Yorker magazine quoted Schwitzky's conclusions that the attacks on Soufan bore all the signs of an organized conspiracy, and confirmed that he was being targeted by many of the same attackers who targeted Adnan Khashoggi, before his assassination.
