= Oliver Schmidt (engineer) =

Engineer convicted for violating emissions standards

- Born: January 9, 1969 (age 57); Stadthagen, West Germany
- Education: Leibniz University of Hannover (Diploma)
- Occupations: Engineer, former business executive
- Spouse: Kerstin Gerdes (m. 2000)
- Children: 2
- Status: Inmate 09786-104; released from FCI Milan in September 2020; transferred to German custody where he was ultimately released in January 2021
- Conviction: December 6, 2017; 8 years ago
- Penalty: 84 months (7 years) imprisonment, $400,000 fine and deportation to Germany

Details
- Date apprehended: January 11, 2017; 9 years ago
- Imprisoned at: Federal Correctional Institution, Milan, Milan, Michigan, U.S.

Oliver Schmidt (born January 9, 1969) is a German engineer and former senior executive for Volkswagen in Germany and the United States. In December 2017, Schmidt was sentenced to 84 months (7 years) in federal prison for his role in the Volkswagen emissions scandal. He was the second German national, after James Robert Liang, to be convicted and sees himself as pawn sacrifice in the entire case.

== Early life and education ==
Schmidt was born January 9, 1969, in Stadthagen, Lower Saxony then West Germany to Dieter and Elke Schmidt. His father worked for a software company and enjoyed mechanically working on cars, therefore Schmidt was basically growing-up with up to 26 different cars his father has owned throughout his lifetime. After completing his Abitur, he studied mechanical engineering at the Leibniz University of Hannover in Hannover, Germany.

== Career ==
Since 1997, Schmidt was employed with Volkswagen in Wolfsburg. At the age of 35, Schmidt was transferred to the United States, where he from 2012 oversaw VW's emissions office in Michigan.

As of March 2022, Schmidt is employed in a CNC-Engineering company of a friend, which primarily manufactures auto parts.

== Volkswagen emissions scandal ==
In January 2017 while attempting to return to Germany after a vacation, Schmidt was arrested in a men's room at a Florida airport, charged with conspiracy to defraud the United States in the Volkswagen emissions scandal. Had Schmidt been able to board a plane and return to Germany, the chances of him being prosecuted would have been slim as it is unlikely that Germany would have extradited one of its own citizens to stand trial in the United States. In December 2017, having earlier pleaded guilty, a federal judge in Detroit sentenced him to seven years in prison and fined him $400,000.

Schmidt was inmate number 09786-104 and was incarcerated at U.S. Federal prison FCI Milan in York Township, Michigan. His release date was set for 25 December 2022. In late September 2020, Schmidt was transferred to Germany where he was incarcerated at Hanover Correctional Center. In January 2021, he was released on parole after serving a bit more than half his sentence.

== Personal life ==
In 2000, Schmidt married Kerstin Gerdes, in Florida, and they have two children.
