= Anthony Chebatoris =

American bank robber

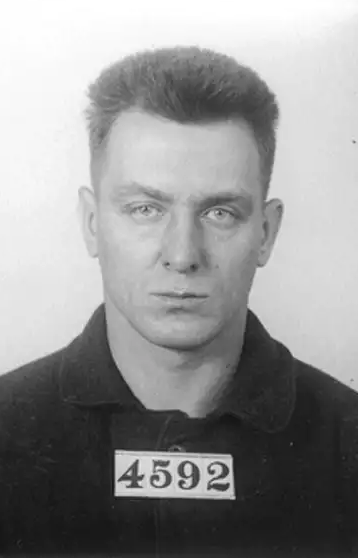
- Chebatoris in 1928
- Born: May 10, 1898; Suwałki Governorate, Russian Empire
- Died: July 8, 1938 (aged 40); York Township, Michigan, U.S.
- Status: Executed by hanging
- Conviction: Killing during the commission of a bank robbery
- Penalty: Death by hanging

Details
- Date: September 29, 1937
- Country: United States
- State: Michigan
- Killed: Henry Porter, 50

Anthony Chebatoris (May 10, 1898 – July 8, 1938) was a Russian-born bank robber and convicted murderer who is the only person to be executed in the U.S. state of Michigan since it gained statehood in 1837. Although Michigan abolished capital punishment for murder in 1847, Chebatoris was tried under the new Federal Bank Robbery Act of 1934, which made bank robbery and its related offenses federal crimes, beyond state jurisdiction.

With another new federal law requiring Chebatoris's execution to take place in Michigan, governor Frank Murphy, citing Michigan's longstanding "civilized record" of not inflicting capital punishment within its borders, petitioned President Franklin D. Roosevelt to commute Chebatoris's sentence to life in prison. After Assistant Attorney General Joseph B. Keenan said there were no extenuating circumstances warranting leniency, Roosevelt refused. Chebatoris was subsequently hanged at Federal Correctional Institution, Milan, a federal prison near Milan, Michigan in 1938.

== Early life ==
Anthony Chebatoris was born on May 10, 1898, in the Suwałki Governorate of the Russian Empire, a predominantly Lithuanian area which lies in modern-day Poland. (Note: The 1910 U.S. census accurately lists Chebatoris's birthplace as "Russian Lithuania." In later years, Chebatoris (and his father) would falsely claim on census forms and other official documents that he had been born in Pennsylvania in 1899 or 1900. His claim of being American-born was likely due to his fear of deportation due to his anarcho-communist political leanings, and later his criminal record; and his younger age to avoid military service in World War I. After his arrest in 1937, a federal immigration official revealed that Chebatoris was a non-citizen alien and thus, pending the criminal charges against him, subject to deportation to Poland.) His father, Michael Chebatoris (né Czebatorius) immigrated to the United States from Suwałki in advance of his wife Victoria and two sons in 1900. In 1902, the family settled in Treveskyn, an unincorporated area of South Fayette Township, Pennsylvania, where Michael worked as a coal miner and the family eventually grew to seven children.

Chebatoris attended school through the eighth grade and worked as a laborer before moving to Detroit in 1919, where he found employment as a chauffeur. On March 30, 1920, he married 17-year-old Catherine Boyd, who was four months pregnant with their daughter Vera. On July 20, 1920, Chebatoris was convicted of armed robbery of a Packard cashier in Detroit and faced a maximum sentence of twenty years behind bars, but was paroled after serving six-and-a-half years at Jackson State Prison. In 1927, he was arrested for violating the Dyer Act in Louisville, Kentucky, and was re-imprisoned at Jackson to serve his full sentence for armed robbery. In 1928, Chebatoris and fellow inmate John "Jack" Gracey conspired to escape from Jackson and were consequently transferred to Marquette Branch Prison in Michigan's Upper Peninsula. Chebatoris was released from prison in December 1935 and moved back to his hometown of Treveskyn, Pennsylvania, where he was quickly sought by police in Washington County on suspicion of burglary and assault.

By 1937, Chebatoris had spent fifteen of his previous seventeen years incarcerated. He had not seen his wife since 1920 and had never met his daughter. He had moved back to Detroit and become reacquainted with fellow ex-convict Jack Gracey, who lived in nearby Hamtramck and was formulating plans for a bank robbery.

== Robbery and murder ==
On September 29, 1937, Chebatoris and Gracey enacted their plan to rob the Chemical State Savings Bank at 317 East Main Street in downtown Midland, Michigan; the bi-weekly Dow Chemical payroll of $75,000 (equivalent to $1,680,000 in 2025) ensured the bank would be flush with cash. Gracey entered the bank at 11:30 a.m. with a sawed-off shotgun while Chebatoris guarded the door with a revolver. Gracey approached 65-year-old bank president Clarence H. Macomber and shoved the shotgun into his ribs. Macomber grabbed the barrel of the weapon, pointing it downward, and began to push the 29-year-old Gracey toward the door until Chebatoris shot Macomber in the shoulder. Paul D. Bywater, the bank's cashier, approached the counter after hearing the commotion, and Chebatoris shot him in the back above the hip, wounding him critically. Both Macomber and Bywater would survive their injuries.

Aborting the robbery, the gunmen fled the bank, got in their black two-door Ford with Chebatoris behind the wheel, and began to drive away. Dr. Frank L. Hardy, whose second-floor dental practice was adjacent to the bank building, heard the gunshots and used a hunting rifle to fire at the getaway car from his office window as it sped south toward the Benson Street bridge out of town. (Note: Hardy, an avid hunter and former World War I army officer, kept a loaded .35 caliber deer rifle in his office specifically as a contingency for a bank robbery next door.) One of Hardy's shots hit Chebatoris's left arm; another hit Gracey's right leg. After the Ford careened into a parked car, Chebatoris and Gracey exited the vehicle, looking for the source of the shots. Truck driver Henry J. Porter of Bay City, a bystander whose cap and uniform were mistaken for those of a police officer, was shot and mortally wounded by Chebatoris. Hardy fired again, hitting Gracey in the elbow, and when Gracey tried to commandeer a truck, Hardy fatally shot him in the head from a distance of 150 yards (140 m). Chebatoris fled along nearby railroad tracks and attempted to hijack an automobile, but was apprehended by road repairman Richard Van Orden and Midland County Sheriff Ira M. Smith.

== Trial ==
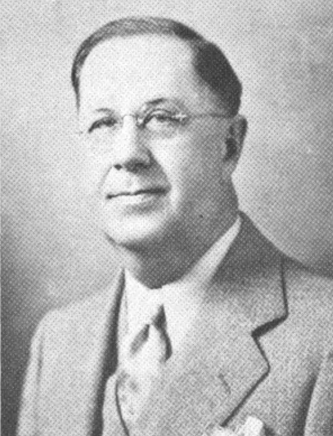
U.S. Attorney John C. Lehr

The Great Depression saw a sharp increase in the frequency and sophistication of bank robberies in the United States, and robbers fleeing across state lines introduced jurisdictional issues for law enforcement. In response, Congress passed the Federal Bank Robbery Act of 1934, which made it a federal crime to rob a federally-organized or federally-insured bank. It also made it a federal crime to cause the death of a person while committing or fleeing from such a crime. (Note: The statute, 12 U.S.C. § 588c, read: "Whoever, in committing any offense defined in section 588b of this title, or in avoiding or attempting to avoid apprehension for the commission of such offense, or in freeing himself or attempting to free himself from arrest or confinement for such offense, kills any person, or forces any person to accompany him without the consent of such person, shall be punished by imprisonment for not less than 10 years, or by death if the verdict of the jury shall so direct.") On October 8, 1937, a federal grand jury indicted Chebatoris for bank robbery and the assaults on Macomber, Bywater, and Porter, but when Porter died from his gunshot wound on October 11, Chebatoris was also indicted for murder. Though pleading guilty to the initial charges, Chebatoris stood mute during the murder indictment, and the case went to trial. Chebatoris was the first person to be tried for murder under the newly-passed bank robbery law.

The trial opened in United States District Court in Bay City on October 26, 1937, with Judge Arthur J. Tuttle presiding. At Tuttle's request, Chebatoris was represented pro bono by veteran Bay City attorneys Dell H. Thompson and James K. Brooker. United States Attorney John C. Lehr, arguing for the prosecution, made it clear that a death sentence was a possibility: "You have been told that there is no capital punishment in Michigan . . . you are in Federal territory here. The laws of Michigan do not apply. The Federal law is that capital punishment may be inflicted," he told the jury. On October 28, 1937, Chebatoris was found guilty of murder under section 588c of the Federal Bank Robbery Act, and the jury, which had the option to bestow a death sentence, did so. After returning to his cell at the Saginaw County Jail, Chebatoris attempted suicide by slashing his throat and wrists with a razor blade, but survived after quick action by jail officials. Unusually, Chebatoris made no appeal of his sentence; according to his attorneys, he asked, "Why appeal? I'm only half a man now. The government might as well finish me off."

== Execution ==
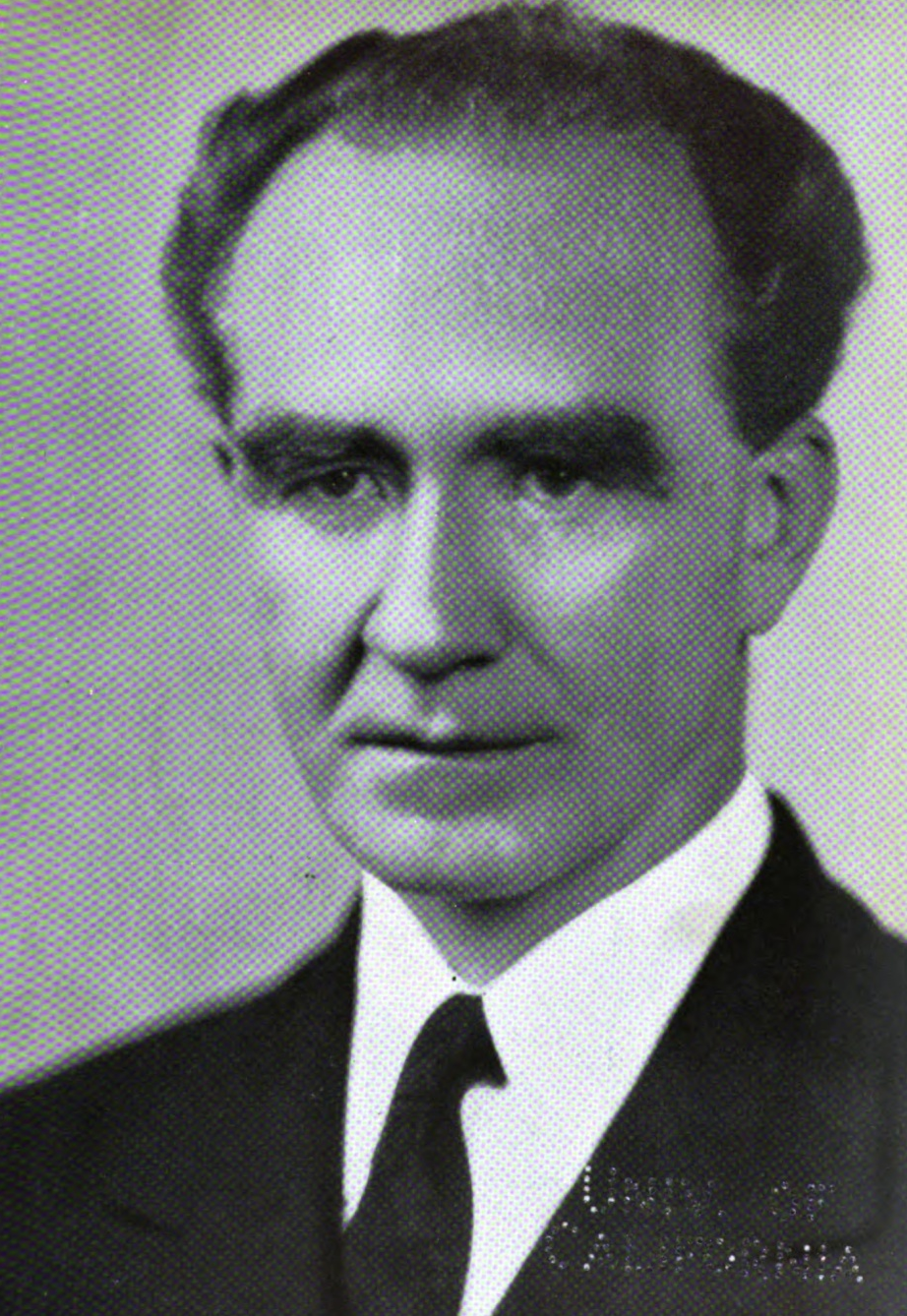
Michigan governor Frank Murphy

A federal law passed in June 1937 required that federal executions take place in the state where the offense occurred for all states that allowed capital punishment. (Note: The statute, 18 U.S.C. § 542, read in part: "The manner of inflicting the punishment of death shall be the manner prescribed by the laws of the State within which the sentence is imposed . . . If the laws of the State within which sentence is imposed make no provision for the infliction of the penalty of death, then the court shall designate some other State in which such sentence shall be executed in the manner prescribed by the laws thereof.") This seemingly excluded Michigan, which had abolished capital punishment for murder in 1847—it was the first English-speaking government in the world to do so—and had never inflicted capital punishment since achieving statehood in 1837. (Note: Michigan, Alaska, and Hawaii are the only states that have never carried out an execution since joining the Union.) Indeed, Judge Tuttle told reporters that if sentenced to death, Chebatoris would "not die in Michigan" because federal capital punishment "may not be effected in states where the death penalty is not operative." Immediately after the trial, Illinois prison officials offered their services to the federal government, and U.S. Attorney General Homer S. Cummings said he would recommend that state or Indiana to Judge Tuttle if consulted in choosing a site. On November 10, 1937, however, U.S. Attorney Lehr discovered that Michigan retained a little-known death penalty statute for treason against the state, thus satisfying the requirement of the federal law and fixing Michigan as the state of execution. (Note: In 1963, Michigan outlawed capital punishment for all crimes—treason had previously been the sole exception—upon the adoption of its new state constitution. During the period the previous law was in effect, no person was executed for treason against the state of Michigan.)

Consequently, Michigan governor Frank Murphy sought to prevent Chebatoris's execution, despite a lack of jurisdiction and considerable public opposition. "Everyone knows [Chebatoris] is guilty," Murphy said. "I'm trying to prevent the federal government from erecting a scaffold and hanging a man in my state, where it hasn't been done in 108 years." Murphy appealed to President Franklin D. Roosevelt, requesting Chebatoris's sentence be commuted to life imprisonment. Sympathetic to the situation, Roosevelt consulted Assistant Attorney General Joseph B. Keenan, who saw no justification for commutation, but said the Justice Department would not object if Judge Tuttle found legal means to move the execution to another state. Tuttle remained steadfast, however, stating that there was no ambiguity in what the law required, and that he had "neither the power nor the inclination to change the sentence." His legal avenues exhausted, Murphy stated that the execution was "a blot on Michigan's civilized record."

Chebatoris was subsequently hanged at the Federal Detention Farm outside Milan, Michigan, on July 8, 1938. The previous day, he had been visited by his now ex-wife Catherine, daughter Vera, and son-in-law Arthur Jackson. The next morning, he left his cell at 5:04 and began the walk to the purpose-built gallows accompanied by Rev. Fr. Lee Laige, who recited prayers. Chebatoris plunged through the trap door at 5:08 a.m. and was pronounced dead thirteen minutes later. Chebatoris is interred at Marble Park Cemetery in York Township after a Catholic ceremony attended by two brothers and a sister.

== See also ==
- Capital punishment in Michigan
- List of people executed in Michigan
- Capital punishment by the United States federal government
- List of people executed by the United States federal government
- List of people executed in the United States in 1938
- Max Stephan, sentenced to death in 1942 by a federal court in Michigan, but had his death sentence commuted to life in prison by the president just nine hours before he was scheduled to be executed
- Marvin Gabrion, sentenced to death in 2002 by a federal court in Michigan
