= Frank Abbott Sweeney Jr =

American former mercenary and serial offender

Frank Abbott Sweeney Jr.
- Born: 1943 (age 82–83); Tenafly, New Jersey, U.S.
- Occupations: Former mercenary; consultant; serial offender
- Known for: Criminal convictions; suspected involvement in the escape of Christopher John Boyce

Frank Abbott Sweeney Jr (born 1943 or 1944) is an American former mercenary and serial offender. After serving several prison terms, for offenses including fraud and wounding a police officer, in the 1990s he ran a business advising first-time federal prisoners.

== Early life and education ==
Sweeney is from Tenafly, New Jersey; his father was an architect and his mother taught violin. He left school after eleventh grade. According to a 2019 statement by his attorney, he suffered from mental illness from an early age.

Sweeney was reported in 1976 to have graduated from Georgetown University in 1965 with a bachelor's degree in psychology.

== Criminal history ==
He was first arrested in 1967 after wounding the chief of police of Tenafly with a Thompson submachine gun that he had purchased as non-working, and served seven years in New Jersey state prison.

He subsequently received several convictions and federal prison terms for crimes including mail fraud—selling nonexistent weapons and misrepresenting cats as exotic breeds after bobbing their tails—and two bank robberies, in one of which he wounded a police officer.

In 1981 he was suspected of aiding the escape of Christopher John Boyce, a former cellblock neighbor, from the Lompoc federal prison in California by enabling him to flee to South Africa, after the discovery of an incriminating letter. Also in the early 1980s, he testified in court against Joseph Paul Franklin, whom he had befriended in a federal prison and who, he said, had bragged to him of killing Black children. He subsequently unsuccessfully sued the federal government for not sufficiently protecting him from possible retaliation by fellow prisoners; prison administrators argued that he had himself revealed his participation in the Witness Security Program.

Sweeney has also been convicted for harassment. In 1995 he pled guilty on an obscenity charge for subscribing to pornography catalogues in the name of a neighbor's nine-year-old son as part of a campaign of harassment against the family, an offense committed while on supervised release after serving a sentence for mail fraud and possession of a firearm by a felon. In December 2019, when he was living in Idaho and had six felony convictions, including attempted homicide and robbery, Sweeney pled guilty to six counts of stalking for three years' harassment by mail and defamation of a woman with whom he had had an argument in a parking lot. He was identified through a report by another family whom he had also harassed after a dispute, and was sentenced to a concurrent 51 months in prison on each count.

== Non-criminal career ==
Sweeney was a mercenary in Rhodesia for three years until 1976, when after returning to the United States, he advertised himself as a source of information for other Americans thinking of joining the Rhodesian Army. He said in an interview that his "strong affinity with European culture" and the fact that the U.S. Army was "made up with Black[s]" made military service at home unappealing to him, and told the Los Angeles Times that he intended to move to South Africa.

In the 1980s, he leveraged his prison experience to start a consulting business advising first-time federal prisoners, including on how to comport themselves behind bars and, he said, on how to secure a transfer to a better-located facility. A former drug smuggler and a former bank robber assisted him in the business. In 1984, he shut down the business on the orders of his probation officer.
