= Federal Correctional Institution, Milan =

Federal prison in Michigan, US

Coordinates: 42°05′40″N 83°40′07″W

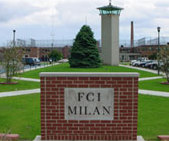
- Interactive map of Federal Correctional Institution, Milan
- Location: Mostly in York Charter Township, a portion in Milan Washtenaw County,
- Status: Operational
- Security class: Low-security
- Population: 1,600
- Opened: 1933
- Managed by: Federal Bureau of Prisons

The Federal Correctional Institution, Milan (FCI Milan) is a U.S. federal prison in Michigan, with most of the prison in York Township, and a portion in Milan. It is operated by the Federal Bureau of Prisons.

This prison is a low-security facility for male inmates. Its adjacent Federal Detention Center houses pretrial and holdover inmates. The institution covers approximately 332 acres (1.34 km^{2}) and consists of 59 buildings with a total gross floor area of 504,200 square feet (46,840 m^{2}).

The facility is 45 miles (72 km) southwest of Detroit, 15 miles (24 km) south of Ann Arbor, and 30 miles (48 km) north of Toledo.

== History ==
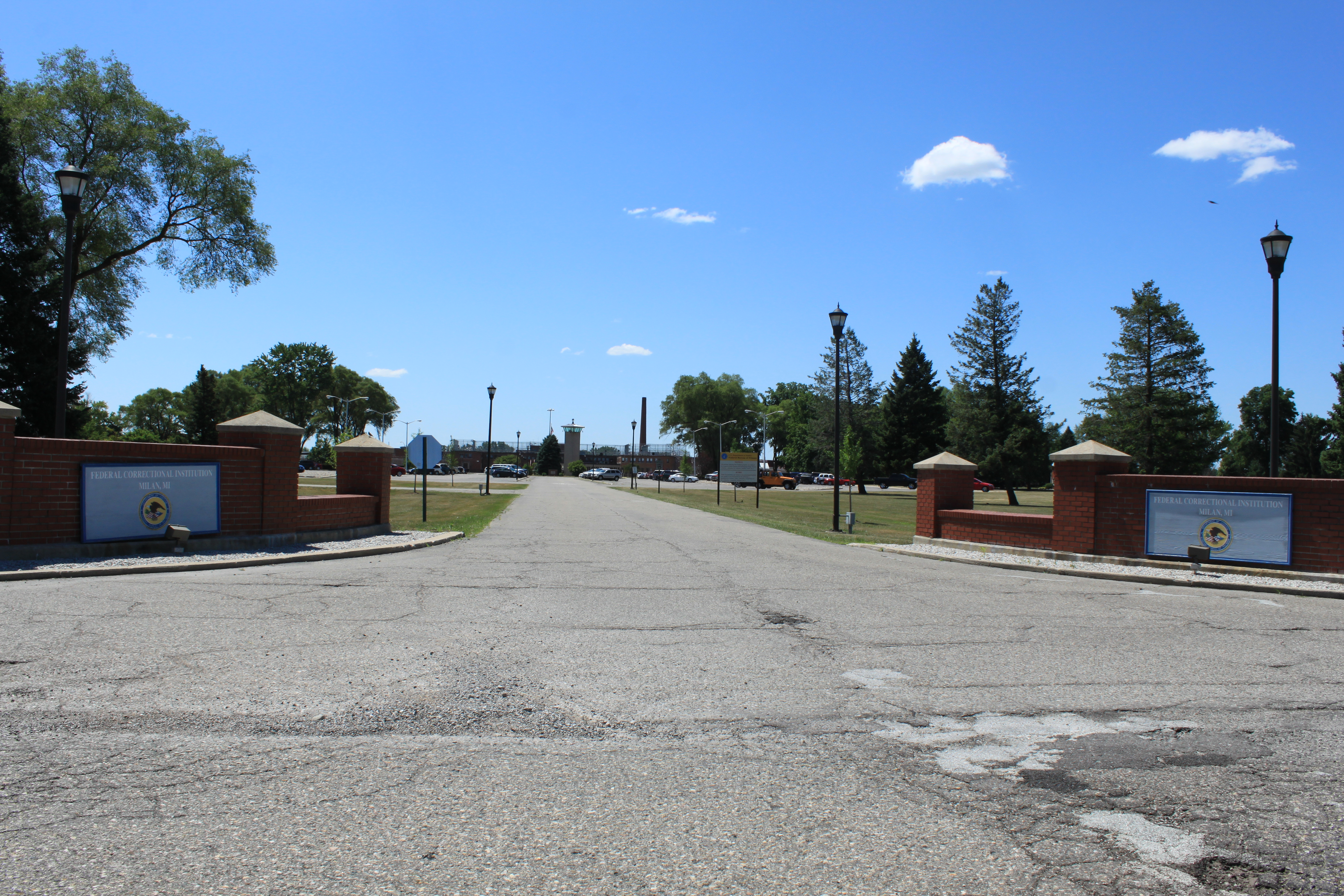
FCI Milan main entrance

FCI Milan was activated on April 6, 1933, as a "Federal Detention Farm" and has undergone mission changes throughout its history. FCI Milan held female inmates from 1933 to 1939, housed offenders sentenced under the Federal Youth Corrections Act of 1950, and was once a medium-security institution. The only federal execution in Michigan occurred on July 8, 1938, when Anthony Chebatoris was hanged for the murder of Henry Porter, a truck driver from Bay City, whom Chebatoris mistook for a police officer during a bank robbery.

Helen Gillis and Evelyn Frechette, the wives of notorious bank robbers Baby Face Nelson and John Dillinger, served one-year sentences at FCI Milan in the mid-1930s after being convicted of aiding their husbands as they evaded authorities.

== Facility and inmate programs ==
FCI Milan covers 300 acres (120 ha) and offers a Residential Drug Abuse Program (RDAP), which offers inmates completing its 500-hour residential program up to a 12-month sentence reduction and up to six months in a halfway house. There are very strict guidelines for admission due to the program's popularity.

The Life Connections Program (LCP) is an 18-month residential voluntary multi-faith restorative justice program which is offered in only four other federal prisons. The program is designed to reduce recidivism and bring reconciliation to the victim, community and inmate through personal transformation using the participant's faith commitment.

FCI Milan offers a unique program in federal prisons in conjunction with Milan High School where inmates can earn a high school diploma. Milan is the only federal prison which has a high school diploma program.

== Notable incidents ==
=== 2019 inmate murder ===
On January 2, 2019, inmate Christian Maire was found beaten and stabbed to death. Maire, who was serving a 40-year sentence for his role in a child pornography production ring, was attacked by inmates Adam Taylor Wright, Jason Dale Kechego, and Alex Albert Castro. Wright and Castro began stabbing Maire before Kechego stomped on Maire's head multiple times before tossing him down a flight of stairs. Wright and Kechego began attacking other inmates and correctional officers responding to the scene. All three men were charged with second-degree murder. Wright and Castro were sentenced to 24 years in prison, while Kechego was sentenced to 28 years. All sentences are running consecutive to previous convictions. Wright, Castro, and Kechego are all currently housed at ADX Florence.

== Notable inmates ==
Inmate Name	Register Number	Photo	Status	Details
Wayne Jenkins	62928-037		Serving a 25-year sentence; scheduled for release in 2037	Former Baltimore Police Department sergeant and Officer in Charge of the Gun Trace Task Force (GTTF), a plainclothes unit that engaged in widespread criminal activities while on duty. Pleaded guilty to numerous federal charges including racketeering, robbery, overtime fraud and planting evidence.
Vicente Zambada Niebla	N/A		Sentenced to 15 years in 2019.	Alleged leader of the Sinaloa Cartel, which imports hundreds of tons of cocaine into the US from Mexico each year and is responsible for thousands of drug-related murders in both countries; extradited to the US in 2010.
John Atchison	42019-039		Committed suicide on October 5, 2007	Arrested for traveling from Florida to Detroit to sexually assault a minor.
Tony Chebatoris	N/A		Executed July 8, 1938	Murderer and bank robber. Only person ever executed inside Michigan since its admission to the Union.
Jeremy Hammond	18729-424		Released from custody on March 5, 2021.	Activist and computer hacker; sentenced 10 years in federal prison for computer fraud in 2013 for hacking the private intelligence firm Stratfor.
Tommy G. Thompson	07332-104		Release date unknown.	Involved in scandal after his discovery of the SS Central America on September 11, 1988. His many technology inventions and eventual discovery were documented in the biography, "Ship of Gold in the Deep Blue Sea" (Gary Kinder) and Thompson's own book, "America's Lost Treasure". Arrested in 2015 at a West Palm Beach, Florida hotel for contempt of court.
Rafiq Abdus Sabir	55312-066		Serving a 25-year sentence; scheduled for release in 2026	Doctor was convicted of providing medical treatment to al-Qaida in America during the Iraq War.
Billy McFarland	91186-054		Released from custody on August 30, 2022.	Defrauded investors of $27.4 million by marketing and selling tickets to a festival and other events. Sentenced to 6 years in 2018.
Umar Farouk Abdulmutallab	44107-039		Transferred to ADX Florence. Serving four consecutive life sentences plus 50 years.	A Nigerian national and Al-Qaeda in the Arabian Peninsula operative, follower of the late militant cleric Anwar al-Awlaki; pleaded guilty in 2011 to attempted use of a weapon of mass destruction for trying to blow up Northwest Airlines Flight 253 from Amsterdam to Detroit on Christmas Day 2009. He was nicknamed the "Underwear Bomber" as the bomb was sewn into his underwear.
Kwame Kilpatrick	44678-039		Released January 20, 2021	Former mayor of Detroit who was convicted of mail fraud, wire fraud, and racketeering. Was held during trial in Detroit. Would be escorted to Detroit daily by helicopters and many military vehicles. Sentenced to 28 years in federal prison. Sentence was commuted by President Donald Trump in January 2021.
Oliver Schmidt	09786-104		Sentenced to 84 months (7 years); transferred/deported to the custody of Germany in September 2020; released in January 2021	Sentenced December 6, 2017 for role in the Volkswagen emissions scandal
Derrick Evans	24839-509		Released October 21, 2022	Participated in the attack on the Capitol on January 6, 2021.
Larry Nassar	21504-040		Transferred to USP Lewisburg. Serving a 60-year federal sentence; scheduled for transfer to a state prison on January 30, 2068. Afterwards, he will serve a state sentence from Michigan ranging anywhere from 40 to 175 years.	Former USA Gymnastics team physician, and Michigan State University professor and clinician, convicted on federal charges relating to the possession of thousands of items of child pornography. Also convicted for sexually assaulting hundreds of underage girls countless times over decades.
Derrick Shareef	22344-424		Serving a 35-year sentence; scheduled for release in 2036.	US citizen and Al-Qaeda supporter; pleaded guilty in 2007 to the attempted use of weapons of mass destruction for plotting to detonate grenades at the Cherryvale Mall in Illinois during Christmas shopping season in 2006.
Drew Drechsel	73733-018		Serving a 10-year, one-month sentence, scheduled for release 03/07/2029.	Named winner of American Ninja Warrior in 2019 (later retroactively disqualified), pleaded guilty on June 1, 2023 to one count of receiving child pornography and one count of knowingly persuading, inducing, enticing and coercing a minor to travel interstate to engage in sexual activity.

== See also ==
- List of U.S. federal prisons
- Federal Bureau of Prisons
- Incarceration in the United States
