= Erik Fleming (director) =

American film director

- Citizenship: United States
- Occupations: Director; producer
- Criminal charges: Conspiracy to distribute ketamine; Distribution resulting in death
- Penalty: 2 years in prison

Details
- Country: United States
- State: California
- Location: Los Angeles

Erik Fleming is an American film and television director and producer. He is a graduate of USC School of Cinematic Arts and known for creating the 1992 experimental short film, The Silver Surfer, which portrayed the Marvel Comics character through CGI. He also has served as a drug counselor. After pleading for his role in actor Matthew Perry's death, Fleming was required to report to a federal prison by noon on June 29, 2026.

== Matthew Perry death case ==
In August 2024, Fleming was charged in connection to actor Matthew Perry's ketamine-related drowning in October 2023. On August 8, 2024, he pleaded guilty to one count of conspiracy to distribute ketamine and one count of distribution of ketamine resulting in death. He could have faced up to 25 years in prison. Fleming was initially scheduled to be sentenced on November 12, 2025. However, The U.S. Attorney's Office for the Central District of California later confirmed he was at this point in time scheduled to be sentenced on January 7, 2026. Fleming admitted to obtaining ketamine for Perry to use from the supplier (Jasveen Sangha) and then giving it to Perry's assistant Kenneth Iwamasa, the person who would then inject Perry with the drug. All the five defendants in the case involving Perry's death would make guilty pleas on separate occasions. Sangha would supply Fleming with 71 vials of ketamine for Perry to use. On May 13, 2026, Judge Sherilyn Peace Garnett sentenced Fleming to two years in prison.

== Partial filmography ==
Year	Title	Director	Producer	Notes	Ref.
1992	The Silver Surfer	Yes	No	Short film	
1995	Cyber Bandits	Yes	No		
1999	My Brother the Pig	Yes	No		
2003	The Surreal Life	No	Yes	Season one only	
