= Mary Collins Whiting =

American lawyer (1835–1912)

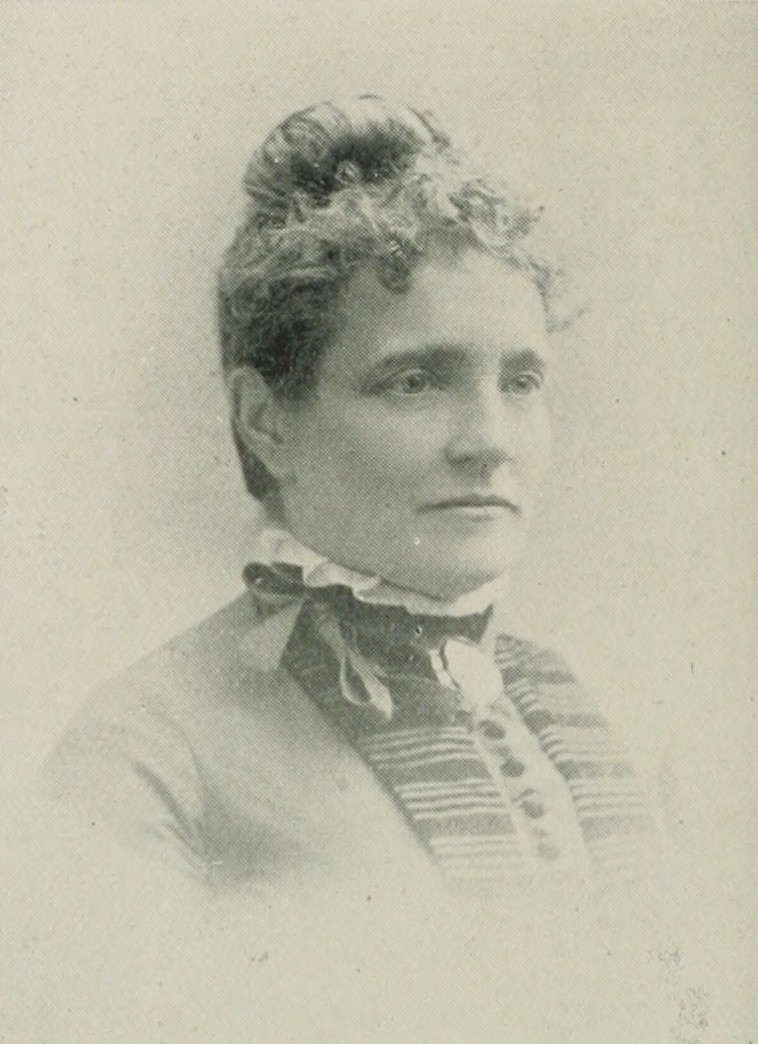
- Born: Mary Collins; March 4, 1835; York Township, Michigan
- Died: February 17, 1912 (aged 76); Whitmore Lake, Michigan
- Education: University of Michigan Law School
- Occupations: Lawyer, Business woman, Teacher
- Spouse: Ralph C. Whiting

Mary Collins Whiting (March 4, 1835 – February 17, 1912) was an American lawyer, businesswoman, and teacher. Whiting became a lawyer at age 52, after which she was in active practice. She also conducted a real estate, brokerage, and insurance business. She was one of the most successful women insurance agents in the United States. She is also remembered for her wide philanthropy.

== Early years and education ==
Mary Collins was born in York Township, Michigan, March 4, 1835. Her parents were George and Phebe Collins, the former a native of Wilbraham, Massachusetts, and the latter of Enfield, Connecticut. They were New Englanders, who settled in Michigan in 1832. Her ancestry can be traced back to the Pilgrim Fathers. In the paternal line, the ancestry can be traced back to Deacon Edward Collins, whose name appeared upon the records of Cambridge, Massachusetts, 1654.

Whiting acquired her early education in the district schools of York township and the Normal School of Ypsilanti.

== Career ==
=== Teacher ===
After completing Normal School, she taught school until she was 19, when, in 1854, she married Ralph C. Whiting, a native of Hartford, Connecticut, who came to Washtenaw County, Michigan with his parents at age 12, the family home being established in Pittsfield. Mr. Whiting was three years his wife's senior. His father, Charles Whiting, was a wholesale leather and shoe dealer at Hartford, and came to Michigan for his health. He purchased a farm of 100 acres (40 ha) east of Ann Arbor, Michigan, which Mrs. Whiting eventually owned. At the time of their marriage, Mr. and Mrs. Whiting received congratulations from Dr. Henry Philip Tappan, chancellor of the Michigan University, who gave a large party in her honor, the families being warm friends, visiting each other frequently until the removal of Dr. Tappan and his son-in-law, Dr. Franz Friedrich Ernst Brünnow, the astronomer, to Europe.

Subsequent to her marriage, Whiting engaged in teaching a private school, having charge of English branches and vocal and instrumental music. She also kept up her literary work, writing for local papers.

=== Lawyer ===
In 1885, she began to study law, mainly for the purpose of handling her large estate, of which she took entire control. She entered the University of Michigan Law School, giving it fifteen hours daily to study, and graduated in 1887, at the age of 52. She was admitted to the Michigan Bar and began to practice in Ann Arbor, Michigan. She pled many cases in the courts in the state, including the Michigan Supreme Court. She also handled various real estate matters. She served as executrix of several estates involving large interests, and never had a will broken. For several years, she served as notary public and was widely recognized as one of the most capable lawyers at the bar of this state. She became one of the most successful women insurance agents in the U.S. In 1885, Whiting was elected clerk of the Michigan Club Court.

=== Philanthropist ===
Whiting established the Mary Collins Whiting Free Dispensary in Busan, Korea, which she termed “A work of love.” Dispensary work was not only carried on there, but the institution was also a Presbyterian mission. Up to September 1899, 8,500 cases were treated and US$9,000 had been collected. The institution had become almost self-supporting, but remained a free dispensary for all unable to pay. Among the Koreans, she was styled “The Princess Whitinski," which name came about in the following manner: Whiting had a picture of herself taken in a full length sealskin coat and chinchilla fur cap and sent to the conservatory by request. The Koreans, from their familiarity with Russian names and titles, and believing that all Caucasian women were princesses with names ending in ski, at once called her the Princess Whitinski, a title of which also indicated the veneration which the native population felt for the founder of the dispensary.

== Personal life ==
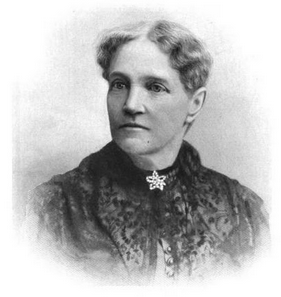
Mary Collins Whiting

Whiting remained a lifelong student and reader, with broad knowledge of the history of the world and its literature. Her leisure hours were largely given to research along lines adding to her knowledge of social and economic conditions, literature and history, and of the world's philanthropic movements, continually enriching her understanding of the great movements of the world and the thoughts of its best writers. She had in her home a large number of interesting relics, many of which descended from previous generations, including an embellished powder horn bearing the date 1764, as well as the first revolver manufactured by Colt. She also had a work basket that once belonged to Martha Washington; it was a wicker piece in the form of a swan and came to her through Lord and Lady Hare's family, to whom Martha Washington had presented it.

Whiting celebrated her golden wedding anniversary by taking a trip with her husband to the Louisiana Purchase Exposition at St. Louis, Missouri, in 1904. She was just recovering from a broken hip, occasioned by a fall from a carriage, and was still on crutches, but she made the journey, spending many hours on the fair grounds.

On January 10, 1906, Ralph C. Whiting died after an illness of several weeks. She died February 17, 1912, at Whitmore Lake, Michigan, and was buried in Ann Arbor.
