= Ann Wyley =

American enslaved woman (died 1777)

Ann Wyley (or Wiley; died March 26, 1777) was an enslaved woman hanged for burglary in Detroit, at the time part of the British Province of Quebec. She is the only black person and one of the only two women known to have been legally executed in Michigan, and the only woman whose identity is known.

Wyley was co-owned by James Abbott and Thomas Finchley, two businessmen in the fur trade who operated a store near Fort Detroit. It is unknown when or how she came to be in their possession. In mid-1774, Wyley was charged with stealing a collection of items from her enslavers, including a purse containing six guineas (equivalent to £1,001 in 2023), a handkerchief, two pairs of women's shoes, and a piece of flannel. Another of the firm's laborers, Jean Contencineau (probably an indentured servant), was also charged as an accomplice, while a third worker, Charles Landry, confessed to involvement but was let free; the two men had both stolen beaver, otter, and raccoon skins. Wyley and Contencineau were additionally charged with arson, as they were alleged to have lit a fire to cover their traces.

After their arrest, Wyley and Contencineau did not face trial until mid-1776, imprisoned in Fort Detroit. The town notary and justice of the peace, Philippe DeJean, granted the pair a jury trial. They were acquitted of arson, as there was only circumstantial evidence, but found guilty of the burglary; Contencineau had testified that Wyley was the "mastermind" of their scheme. As the fort had suffered a recent spate of petty thefts, DeJean wished to make an example of them. He sentenced them to death, a decision ratified by Lieutenant-Governor Henry Hamilton. Wyley and Contencineau were publicly hanged on March 27, 1777. According to some sources, DeJean offered to pardon Wyley if she performed Contencineau's execution herself, as no one else was willing to serve as executioner. She did so "in such a clumsy fashion that the spectators were horrified at the struggles of the victim" but was then hanged anyway.

== See also ==
- Capital punishment in Michigan
- List of people executed in Michigan
