= List of people executed in Michigan =

The following is a list of people executed by the U.S. state of Michigan; which abolished the death penalty in 1847. No executions have been carried out under the authority of the state of Michigan. The one person executed after 1847 was executed by the United States strictly within federal jurisdiction. Thus, it was not performed within the legal boundaries of Michigan as a matter of law.

== French and British colonial periods ==
Name	Date of execution	Crime	Method	Race
French jurisdiction
Folle-Avoine	November 29, 1683	Murder	Shot	Native American
Unknown	November 29, 1683	Murder	Shot	Native American
Pierre Berge (or Boucher) dit La Tulipe	November 26, 1705	Rape	Hanging (in Montreal)	White
Bartellemy Pichon dit La Roze	November 7, 1707	Desertion	Hanging	White
British jurisdiction
Unknown female slave (whose owner's name was Clapham)	April 1763	Murder	Hanging	Native American
Michael Dué	late 1760s	Murder	Hanging	White
Joseph Hecker	December 1775	Murder	Hanging	White
Jean Baptiste Contincineau	March 26, 1777	Burglary	Hanging	White
Ann Wyley	March 26, 1777	Burglary	Hanging	Black

== Under U.S. jurisdiction (Michigan Territory) ==
Name	Date of execution	Crime	Method	Race
Buhnah	1819	Murder	Hanging	Native American
Ketauka	December 27, 1821	Murder	Hanging	Native American
Kewaubis	December 27, 1821	Murder	Hanging	Native American
James Brown	February 1, 1830	Murder	Hanging	White
Stephen Simmons	September 24, 1830	Murder	Hanging	White
Wau-Bau-Ne-Me-Mee	July 1836	Murder	Hanging	Native American

== Federal executions in Michigan ==
Only one person has been executed by the United States for a federal crime committed in Michigan. The execution was carried out at Federal Correctional Institution, Milan, in York Charter Township near the Village of Milan.

Name	Date of execution	Crime	Method	Race
Anthony Chebatoris	July 8, 1938	Murder	Hanging	White

As a matter of jurisdictional law, this execution did not take place in Michigan per se because it was carried out by the United States government at a US government-owned facility, located in but not subject to the State of Michigan's jurisdiction.

== See also ==
- Capital punishment in Michigan
- Capital punishment in the United States
