= Rafiq Abdus Sabir =

American convicted of providing support to terrorism

- Born: 1954 or 1955 (age 71–72); New York City, New York, U.S.
- Education: Columbia University College of Physicians and Surgeons; City College of New York
- Occupation: Physician
- Status: Incarcerated at Danbury Federal
- Penalty: 25 years imprisonment

Rafiq Abdus Sabir is an American doctor convicted of supporting terrorism, for agreeing to provide medical treatment to insurgents wounded in the US-led Invasion of Iraq.

Born in New York City, Sabir was raised by his mentally ill mother after his father abandoned the family. He graduated from Columbia University and worked as an emergency room physician in Boca Raton, Florida, (including at Glades General Hospital) and Saudi Arabia, paying off $750,000 in medical school debts, living with his common-law wife and their two sons. He converted to Islam in the 1980s.

He was approached by undercover FBI agent Ali Soufan, who pretended to be a member of al-Qaeda wanting to set up medical care for injured fighters. Sabir was arrested on May 28, 2005, at his home in the Villa San Remo gated community, where he had lived for the previous two years.

Sabir is a friend of Tarik Shah, a New York jazz musician and martial-arts expert who was convicted of agreeing to provide training to Iraqi insurgents. Shah pleaded guilty and agreed to serve 15 years in prison and was the one who gave the FBI Sabir's name as a "co-accomplice". Brooklyn bookstore owner Abdulrahman Farhane and Washington D.C. cabdriver Mahmud al-Mutazzim received 13 and 15 years' imprisonment, respectively, in the same FBI sting operation.

Shah and Sabir swore Bayat together, though Sabir later claimed that since the oath was simply repeating Arabic that was read to him by the FBI agent, he hadn't understood what was being said, and that the agent's primitive Arabic resulted in words like "al-Qaeda" being mispronounced and undecipherable, as demonstrated in audiotapes played for the courtroom. Federal prosecutor Karl Metzner argued that since Sabir had lived in Saudi Arabia for several months, he must be able to speak Arabic.

Other evidence argued by Metzner included the fact that Sabir was a legal firearms owner.

Sabir was found guilty on May 21, 2007, and expressed disappointment with the verdict through his lawyer Ed Wilford. On November 28, 2007, Sabir was sentenced to 25 years' imprisonment, out of a possible maximum of 30. He is incarcerated at FCI Milan, with a release date of 2026.
