= My Brother the Pig =

1999 film by Erik Fleming

- DVD cover
- Directed by: Erik Fleming
- Written by: Matthew Flynn
- Produced by: Don Reardon
- Starring: Scarlett Johansson; Eva Mendes; Judge Reinhold; Alex D. Linz; Renée Victor; Marco Rodríguez; Romy Walthall; Eduardo Garcia
- Cinematography: Michael Stone
- Edited by: Scott Conrad
- Music by: Michael Giacchino
- Production company: Unapix Productions
- Distributed by: Brimstone Entertainment; Ardustry Home Entertainment
- Release date: September 10, 1999 (United States)
- Running time: 92 minutes
- Country: United States
- Language: English

My Brother the Pig is a 1999 American children's fantasy comedy film directed by Erik Fleming and written by Matthew Flynn. It stars Scarlett Johansson, Eva Mendes, Judge Reinhold, and Alex D. Linz.

== Plot ==
A boy named George is magically transformed into a pig. In a dangerous and crazy adventure, the boy, his sister Kathy, his best friend Freud, and their housekeeper Matilda leave for Mexico to try to undo the witchcraft spell before their parents return from their Paris trip.

While gathering ingredients for Matilda's grandmother, Berta, to undo the spell, Kathy grows impatient and after insulting both Matilda and Berta, storms off into town, where she befriends two Mexican girls who speak English and have satellite TV. Meanwhile, Freud accidentally loses George to Edwardo, a butcher. With Kathy and her friends, they try to rescue George, angering Edwardo.

They get George to Coyote Mountain, under a full moon phase, where a potion has been prepared to return George to normal. Unfortunately, Edwardo had followed them, just as the ritual had begun. Matilda and Berta dose Edwardo with the potion, turning him into a vulture, while George is restored to normal. They soon return home and act like nothing has happened, except for the fact that George still has a pig's tail.

== Cast ==
- Scarlett Johansson as Kathy Caldwell
- Nick Fuoco as George Caldwell
  - Dee Bradley Baker as the voice of Pig George
- Eva Mendes as Matilda
- Alex D. Linz as Freud
- Judge Reinhold as Richard Caldwell
- Renée Victor as Grandma Berta
- Marco Rodríguez as Edwardo
- Romy Walthall as Dee Dee Caldwell
- Eduardo Garcia as Luis

Animal actors Bronco, Gloria, Patches, Piggy, Red, and Trouble portray Pig George.

== Release ==
According to author Michael A. Schuman, My Brother the Pig was given a brief theatrical run, after which it was "soon forgotten".

== Reception ==
The Dove Foundation gave the movie its seal of approval, writing, "The adventure the kids go on with their nanny to save Kathy's brother George is filled with fun and excitement." Kim R. Holston and Warren Hope reviewed the film, calling it "mildly entertaining but strains credulity".
