= Marvin Gabrion =

American murderer (born 1953)

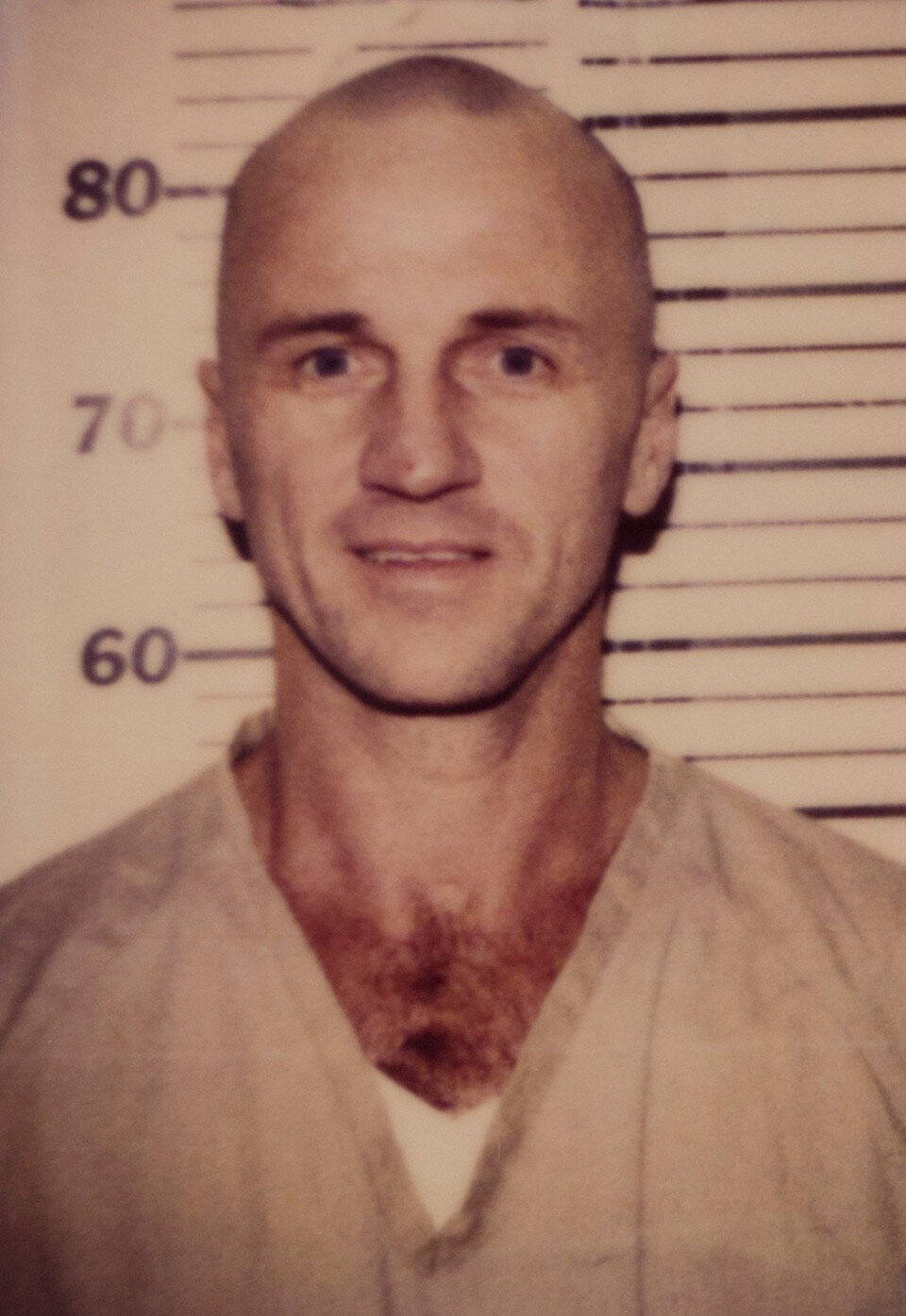
- Born: Marvin Charles Gabrion; October 18, 1953 (age 72); United States
- Status: Incarcerated
- Conviction: First degree murder
- Penalty: Death; commuted to life imprisonment without parole

Details
- Victims: Confirmed; Rachel and Shannon Timmerman; Suspected; Robert Allen, John Weeks, and Wayne Davis
- Country: United States
- State: Michigan (federal jurisdiction)
- Imprisoned at: United States Medical Center for Federal Prisoners in Springfield, Missouri

Marvin Charles Gabrion (born October 18, 1953) is an American murderer, rapist, and suspected serial killer convicted of the 1997 kidnapping and murder of 19-year-old Rachel Timmerman, of Cedar Springs, Michigan. Timmerman and her 11-month-old daughter, Shannon, disappeared two days before Gabrion was set to stand trial on rape charges filed by Rachel the previous summer. Rachel's body was found in Oxford Lake, weighted down by cinder blocks. Shannon remains missing, but is presumed deceased. Although Gabrion was not tried for killing Shannon, court documents describe her murder as "virtually undisputed."

Gabrion is also the prime suspect in the disappearances and murders of several other people, including an additional witness who was set to testify against him in the trial for rape, his handyman, another potential witness and family friend, and an unknown man. The bodies of these people, who were witnesses to his case, are yet to be found, but various items belonging to them were recovered from his home.

The case received national attention both for the brutality of the crime and for the controversial sentence. Michigan abolished the death penalty in 1846, but as Timmerman's body was found within the Huron–Manistee National Forests, a federal government-owned forest, the murder was therefore also a violation of U.S. federal law, which authorizes the death penalty irrespective of local state law. Gabrion, who was tried in the U.S. District Court for the Western District of Michigan, thus is the first person sentenced to death by a federal court located in a non-death penalty state since the federal death penalty was reinstated in 1988. On December 23, 2024, Gabrion's death sentence was commuted to life without parole by President Joe Biden.

== Early life ==
Gabrion is the fifth of six children of Marvin Sr. and Elaine Gabrion.

Gabrion's father was an alcoholic who reportedly abused him. Gabrion's parents were often absent from the home, leaving his sisters to care for Gabrion and his brothers. Gabrion's sister Yvonne remembered when her mother threw a butcher knife at her father.

== Assault charge ==
On August 7, 1996, Rachel Timmerman reported to Newaygo County Sheriff's department that she had been raped by Marvin Gabrion. The previous evening, she had been invited to a card game by a family friend named Wayne Davis and a classmate of Rachel's named Mikey Gabrion. Davis and Gabrion arrived to pick up Timmerman along with Gabrion's uncle Marvin. On the way to the card game, Marvin Gabrion allegedly forced Davis and Mikey Gabrion out of the car before driving off and raping Rachel. Gabrion was arrested and charged with the crime.

== Disappearances ==
Victim Rachel Timmerman and her daughter Shannon Verhage

On June 3, 1997, two days before Gabrion's trial on the charge of rape, Timmerman left the house with her 11-month-old daughter Shannon, telling her family she was going on a date with a man she met at work. Her father soon received a letter stating that she planned to leave town and elope. The prosecutor and the judge presiding over the case also received letters in Timmerman's handwriting stating that the rape allegations were fabricated and that she wished to drop the charges against Gabrion.

Another letter identified the man she left with as "Delbert." Rachel's family believed the letters were legitimate, and her disappearance was not investigated at the time.

== Investigation ==
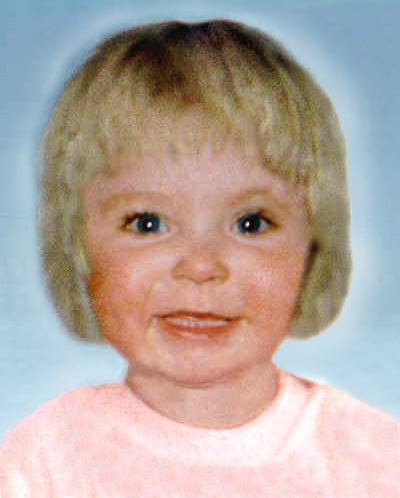
1998 age progression of Shannon by the FBI

On July 5, 1997, two fishermen found Rachel's body in Oxford Lake chained to cinder blocks and her face wrapped with duct tape. According to the coroner, she was alive when she entered the lake and died from drowning.

Gabrion quickly became a prime suspect in her death. A search warrant was executed for his residence and keys that matched the padlock used to secure Rachel's body were found at Gabrion's home, along with concrete blocks stained with the same paint as the ones retrieved from the lake. Marvin's nephew, Mikey Gabrion, led police to a campsite that had frequently been used by his uncle. Gabrion's tent was found there, along with bolt cutters, chain, duct tape, a woman's hair clip, and nipples for a baby bottle.

Gabrion's neighbors reported that Gabrion had a handyman named John Weeks. Investigators contacted Weeks' girlfriend, who identified a photo of Gabrion as a man introduced to her as "Lance". She reported that Lance had left the area with Weeks and she hadn't heard from him and was unsure of how to get hold of him. She also reported to police that on one occasion she caught John on the phone with a girl named Rachel. When she confronted him, she was told that he was trying to do a favor for Lance, who was interested in being set up with her. Authorities believe that Weeks was the mystery date who picked up Rachel and Shannon on the day they were last seen and that he arranged the date at the behest of Gabrion.

The search for Gabrion lasted two months until they received a tip that Gabrion was set to receive a social security check from a post office in Sherman, New York. FBI agents covertly staked out the location and he was arrested as he left the post office.

Timmerman's daughter, Shannon, has never been found. However, it is "virtually undisputed" that Gabrion caused her death.

== Other disappearances ==
Gabrion is a suspect in the disappearance of several other people. Gabrion lived in a house owned by a man named Robert Allen, who went missing in 1995. Gabrion cashed Allen's Social Security checks and lived in his home until 1997. Gabrion was convicted of social security fraud in July 1998 for his use of Allen's checks and sentenced to five years in federal prison.

Wayne Davis, the family friend who invited Timmerman the night she was raped, disappeared in February 1997. Davis was set to testify against Gabrion at the upcoming rape trial. Davis' residence was largely undisturbed aside from a stolen stereo system. It was later discovered that Gabrion had attempted to pawn it. In July 2002, canoeists found Davis's body in Twinwood lake, another body of water in the same national forest where Rachel's body was found.

John Weeks's whereabouts are also unknown. Gabrion was the last known person to see him alive in June 1997.

Weeks and Allen are presumed deceased. Gabrion remains the prime suspect in the disappearances of the three men but has not been charged.

== Trial ==
Gabrion was tried in 2002 for the murder of Rachel Timmerman. The prosecution presented testimony from multiple witnesses who described Gabrion's propensity for violence, including other physical and sexual assaults. Two witnesses testified that their homes had been set on fire following altercations with Gabrion. Another woman described how Gabrion turned a rifle on her and her two-year-old child. Evidence implicating Gabrion in the disappearances of Allen and the other men was also admitted.

The trial was also noted for the judge's decision to deny the defendant's right to fire his counsel and defend himself in court due to Gabrion's erratic behavior and frequent disruption of court proceedings. In full view of the jury, Gabrion punched his defense attorney in the face and committed 40 major infractions. At the Calhoun County Jail, Gabrion filed numerous bizarre motions using "abusive and obscene language." During his appeal, the appellate court affirmed that the District Court had every reason to deny Gabrion's right to represent himself, noting that his erratic and disruptive behavior would certainly have continued if he had the opportunity.

The defense countered that Gabrion's temperament and actions were the results of multiple car accidents that had resulted in brain injuries as well as a troubled childhood. He was convicted and was sentenced to death.

== Death penalty debate ==
United States v. Gabrion is considered a landmark case for its use of the death penalty in a non-death penalty state. Capital punishment has been abolished in Michigan since 1846. Michigan was the first English-speaking jurisdiction to eliminate the death penalty. Federal jurisdiction allowed prosecutors to seek the death penalty in the case. Rachel's body was found on federal land in Manistee National Forest, allowing prosecutors to try Gabrion in federal court and seek the death penalty on federal charges. This sentence is not provided for under Michigan law. Gabrion was the first person in the United States to receive the death penalty for a crime committed in a non-death penalty state since the federal death penalty was reinstated in 1988, as well as the first person to be sentenced to death in the state of Michigan since 1937.

During the trial, Gabrion's defense argued that she might have been killed outside Manistee National Forest before being transported into the park to be disposed of. Therefore, the murder occurred on state property instead of federal property. The jury found, beyond a reasonable doubt, that Gabrion killed Timmerman inside the national forest. In 2011, Gabrion appealed both the conviction and the sentence. The defense maintained that jurors should have been told that had Gabrion been tried in state court, he would not have faced the death penalty. In his appeal, Gabrion's defense argued that under the Eighth Amendment and the Federal Death Penalty Act, Gabrion was entitled to argue to the jury during the penalty phase of his trial that they should consider any "residual doubt" that he killed Timmerman inside the national forest. The conviction was upheld, but the sentence was overturned.

In their decision, the court wrote,

The case was not brought to serve a special national interest like treason or terrorism different from the normal state interest in punishing murder. The jury should be allowed to consider whether one or more of them would choose a life sentence rather than the death penalty when the same jury considering the same defendant's proper punishment for the same crime but prosecuted in Michigan state court could not impose the death penalty.

In 2013, the Sixth Circuit Court of Appeals sitting en banc overturned the earlier decision by a three-judge panel and the death penalty was reinstated. Gabrion sat on death row at United States Penitentiary, Terre Haute. Currently, he is held at the United States Medical Center for Federal Prisoners in Springfield, Missouri.

== Commutation of federal death sentence ==
On December 23, 2024, Gabrion's federal death sentence was commuted to life without parole after outgoing President Joe Biden granted sentence commutations to 37 of the 40 inmates on federal death row.

== Media coverage ==
The case garnered national attention and was featured on the Investigation Discovery show FBI: Criminal Pursuit as well as Unsolved Mysteries. Rachel's father and uncle published a book about the case called The Color of Night: A Young Mother, and a Cold-Blooded Killer. The legal aspects of the death sentence in this case were described in the book Cause of Death: Forensic Files of a Medical Examiner as well as the law text book Psychiatry in Law.

== See also ==
- List of homicides in Michigan
- Tony Chebatoris
- Capital punishment by the United States federal government
- Capital punishment in Michigan
- List of inmates at the United States Penitentiary, Terre Haute
