= Jasveen Sangha =

British-American socialite and convicted drug dealer

Jasveen Sangha (born July 22, 1983) is a British-American convicted felon and drug dealer known as the Ketamine Queen. She gained international attention following her indictment and subsequent guilty plea in connection with the overdose death of actor Matthew Perry. Prosecutors alleged that Sangha operated a drug distribution network from her North Hollywood home for several years. On April 8, 2026, Sangha was sentenced to 15 years in prison for her role in supplying the ketamine that would cause Perry's death. She has remained in prison since August 2024.

== Early life and education ==
Sangha was born in London. She is of Punjabi origin and is the daughter of entrepreneur Nilem Singh and Baljeet Singh Chhokar. Her grandparents amassed a fortune in the fashion retail industry in east London. Following her mother's remarriage, the family relocated to Calabasas, California, where Sangha spent her youth.

In 2001, Sangha completed her high school education in Calabasas. Her senior yearbook entry featured the quote: "It isn't what they say about you, it's what they whisper." She attended the University of California, Irvine, graduating with a bachelor's degree in social sciences. In 2010, she earned an M.B.A. from Hult International Business School in London.

Sangha was involved with a business in Studio City, Los Angeles, known as the Stiletto Nail Bar. Prosecutors noted in court filings that she did not appear to hold legitimate employment from 2019 onward.

== Drug trafficking activities ==
According to the indictment, Sangha used her apartment located in a midrise complex in North Hollywood to produce, stockpile, and sell illicit drugs over a five-year period. As part of her plea agreement, she acknowledged that her residence had functioned as a distribution hub starting no later than 2019. She was referred to by associates and customers as the Ketamine Queen.

In August 2019, Sangha sold ketamine to a customer named Cody McLaury, who died from an overdose shortly after the transaction. Prosecutors alleged that Sangha was aware her product had caused McLaury's death citing a text message she received from the victim's sister but continued her trafficking operations regardless. During a search of her home in March 2024, law enforcement agents recovered a variety of substances, including cocaine, counterfeit Xanax, methamphetamine pills, and nearly 80 vials of liquid ketamine.

After Dr. Salvador Plasencia reduced his distribution of ketamine, Sangha became the main supplier of ketamine to actor Matthew Perry. In October 2023, Sangha collaborated with Erik Fleming to provide ketamine to Perry. She first supplied a sample of the drug in an unbranded glass vial capped with a blue lid. Following this initial exchange, she sold approximately 50 vials to Perry's assistant, Kenneth Iwamasa, through Fleming. During a subsequent transaction involving 25 vials, she included ketamine-infused lollipops as a bonus.

Prosecutors stated that the specific dose responsible for Perry's death came from one of the vials Sangha sold. When news of the actor's death broke, Sangha reportedly messaged Fleming on an encrypted app, instructing him to delete their chat history.

=== Legal proceedings ===
Authorities arrested Sangha on drug charges in March 2024, after which she was released on a $100,000 bond. She was indicted again in August 2024, along with four co-defendants, for her specific role in Perry's death. Following her August 2024 arrest, Sangha's bail was subsequently revoked, and she has since remained detained at a federal prison.

On September 3, 2025, Sangha entered a guilty plea for five federal charges: one count of maintaining a drug-involved premises, one count of distribution resulting in death, and three counts of ketamine distribution. The crimes carried a maximum sentence of up to 65 years in prison. Sentencing was initially set for December 10, 2025. However, her sentencing was later scheduled to take place on February 25, 2026, and then once again rescheduled to take place on April 8, 2026. Prosecutors sought a prison sentence of 15 years plus three years of supervised release, while Sangha's lawyers requested she be sentenced to time served. On April 8, 2026, Judge Sherilyn Peace Garnett sentenced Sangha to 15 years in federal prison.

== Personal life ==
On her social media profiles, Sangha cultivated an image as a curator of art and a frequent traveler between London and Los Angeles. In the months following Perry's death, she documented travels to Japan and Mexico, posting photos of herself enjoying luxury amenities such as caviar and afternoon tea. She also celebrated her 40th birthday at a Los Angeles Koreatown lounge called Kiss Kiss Bang Bang.

In July 2024, weeks before being indicted for Perry's death, she posted an image of a bracelet adorned with mushroom charms, captioned "Pulling out old raver candy #ravetothegrave."
