= Prison consultant =

Advisor for newly convicted criminals

A prison consultant provides newly convicted criminals with advice on how to cope and survive in prison. Prison consultants may also provide a client's attorney with advice on how to lobby the sentencing judge for a shorter sentence and get a client sentenced to a lower security level prison. They may advise white-collar and celebrity criminals, high-level drug dealers and disgraced politicians to help them navigate prison.

Prison consultants charge anywhere from several hundred to many thousands of dollars, with no promises made. Among their past clients have been Lori Loughlin, Bernard Madoff, Michael Milken, Ivan Boesky, Mike Tyson, Michael Vick, Plaxico Burress, Martha Stewart, and Leona Helmsley.

== Practitioners ==
Becoming a prison consultant requires no formal training or certification, and no agency tracks those in the business. Certifications for prison consultants exist, but none are issued by an accredited entity. Most people who hold themselves out as prison consultants are ex-convicts who, by the nature of their background, are considered to be disreputable. Most prison consultants are sole-practitioners, giving cause for further skepticism.

Despite skepticism, the industry is changing; what first was a service accessed only by the rich and famous, services are increasingly being accepted by middle-class convicts. As the field of practitioners grows, consultants with non-traditional incarceration experience have entered the industry to offer services to those skeptical of solo-practitioners and convicts without verifiable success in custody, including undercover inmates and reality television celebrities from A&E Networks program 60 Days In.

The Federal Bureau of Prisons takes no position on consulting.

== Advice ==
In general, prison consultants will advise prison-bound clients to keep a low profile and avoid offending other inmates. Offenses can include joining a conversation without an invitation, asking personal questions without a proper cue, and taking liberties with the television (most fights take place in the TV room).

Prison consultants can help navigate early-release programs and will recommend entry into a drug or alcohol rehab program. Federal prison consultants often educate clients regarding the Residential Drug Abuse Program, a 500-hour program which can reduce a federal sentence up to 12 months.

Consultants may advise about Federal Bureau of Prisons employee personality types; how to defend one's self in a prison fight; and how best to avoid being raped, stabbed or beaten.

Clients are warned to expect strip searches and to accept a complete loss of personal control to the guards.

== See also ==
- Prisoners' rights
