= Capital punishment in Michigan =

Capital punishment in Michigan was legal from the founding of Sault Ste Marie in 1668 during the French colonial period, until abolition by the state legislature in 1846 (except nominally for treason). Only one federal execution has ever been carried out in Michigan, at FCI Milan in 1938.

Michigan's death penalty history is unusual, as Michigan was the first Anglosphere jurisdiction in the world to abolish the death penalty for ordinary crimes. The Michigan State Legislature voted to do so on May 18, 1846, and that has remained the law ever since. Although the death penalty was formally retained as a punishment for treason until 1963, no person was ever tried for treason against Michigan. Thus, Michigan has not executed any person since before statehood.

== History ==
All executions, save one, in areas which are now part of the State of Michigan were performed before the state was admitted to the Union, when Michigan became the 26th State on January 26, 1837.

About a dozen people are known to have been executed from 1683 to 1836. The area that is now Michigan was part of colonial New France from 1612 (first permanent settlement, Sault Sainte Marie, 1668) to 1763, when the Treaty of Paris (1763) transferred New France to Great Britain. It was part of British Indian Territory, 1763 to 1774 when it became part of the Province of Quebec. The Treaty of Paris (1783) legally transferred the area to the new United States of America but Lower Michigan remained under British control until 1796, and Upper Michigan until 1818 (transferred pursuant to the Treaty of Ghent of 1814). In this early period, there were a number of cases where persons who had committed a capital crime in Detroit were transported to Montreal for trial and execution.

The first person known to be executed in Michigan was an Aboriginal North American named Folle-Avoine. The first person executed under US Jurisdiction was a Native American named Buhnah. Two women were executed in Michigan, both during the British colonial period – an unnamed Native American slave (owned by a man named Clapham) in 1763, and a black slave named Ann Wyley in 1777. By race, seven of 15 were Native Americans; seven were European-Americans; and one was an African-American.

The 1830 hanging of a tavern keeper, Stephen Gifford Simmons, who had in a drunken fit killed his wife, generated more popular opposition to the death penalty than the prior hanging of Native Americans. Consequently, Simmons' was the last execution under Michigan law. In 1840, the people of Michigan learned that an innocent man had been hanged across the river from Michigan, in what is now Windsor, Ontario, as the true perpetrator of the crime had made a deathbed confession.

The death penalty has been unconstitutional in Michigan since the 1963 constitution took effect on 1 January 1964.

In a rare case, Michigan-born convicted killer Demetrius Terrence Frazier, who was serving life in prison for the 1992 murder of Crystal Kendrick in Detroit, was transferred to another prison in Alabama, where he was sentenced to death for the 1991 rape-murder of Pauline Brown at the Alabama city of Birmingham. When Frazier's death sentence was scheduled to be carried out in February 2025, his lawyers filed an appeal a month prior, seeking Frazier's return to Michigan to serve his life sentence, which would possibly spare his life since there was no capital punishment in Michigan. Subsequently, the Michigan authorities refused to apply for Frazier to come back to Michigan, and the Michigan governor Gretchen Whitmer chose to not intervene in the execution. Frazier, who was executed on February 6, 2025, in the Holman Correctional Facility of Alabama, was the first inmate under the Michigan prison system to be executed in another state.

== Federal death penalty ==
Even though Michigan abolished the death penalty in 1846, the federal death penalty can still be imposed. Thus, the United States was able to execute Tony Chebatoris at the Federal Detention Farm (now Federal Correctional Institution, Milan) near Milan, Michigan in 1938, for a murder he committed while robbing a federal bank in Midland, Michigan. Max Stephan, convicted of treason, was scheduled to be hanged at Milan in 1943, but President Franklin D. Roosevelt commuted his sentence to life in prison just nine hours before his scheduled execution. Since Stephan had been prosecuted for treason, however, he still could've faced execution had he been tried by a state court at the time.

The 2002 conviction of Marvin Gabrion received national attention when he was sentenced to death for the murder of Rachel Timmerman in Newaygo County, Michigan. Gabrion was also suspected of four other killings but was never tried for them, including the murder of Rachel Timmerman's 11-month-old daughter Shannon Verhage. About 22 years after he was first sent to death row, Gabrion's federal death sentence was commuted to life imprisonment without the possibility of parole by outgoing President Joe Biden, who granted clemency to 37 out of 40 inmates on federal death row.

U.S. Attorneys (i.e. federal prosecutors) in the latter case relied on the dual sovereignty doctrine to seek a death sentence because the murder took place on federal land. Gabrion was the first person in the United States to receive the federal death penalty for a crime committed in a non-death penalty state since the federal death penalty was reinstated in 1988. The sentence was overturned in 2013 by a panel of the Sixth Circuit, but was later reinstated 12–4 by the full court sitting en banc.

== See also ==
- List of people executed in Michigan
- Crime in Michigan
- Law of Michigan
