= York Township, Michigan =

- Charter township
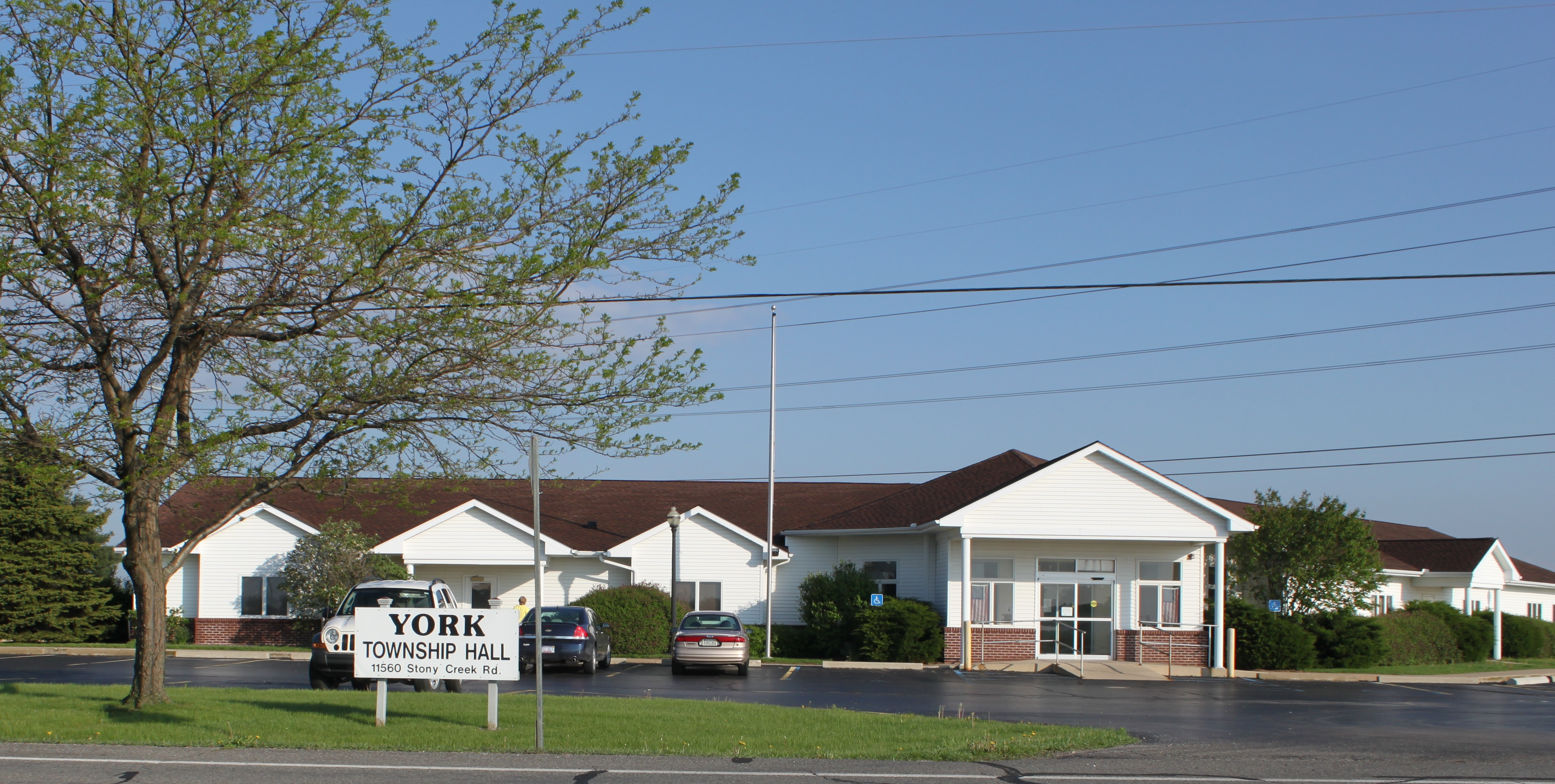
- York Township Hall

- Seal

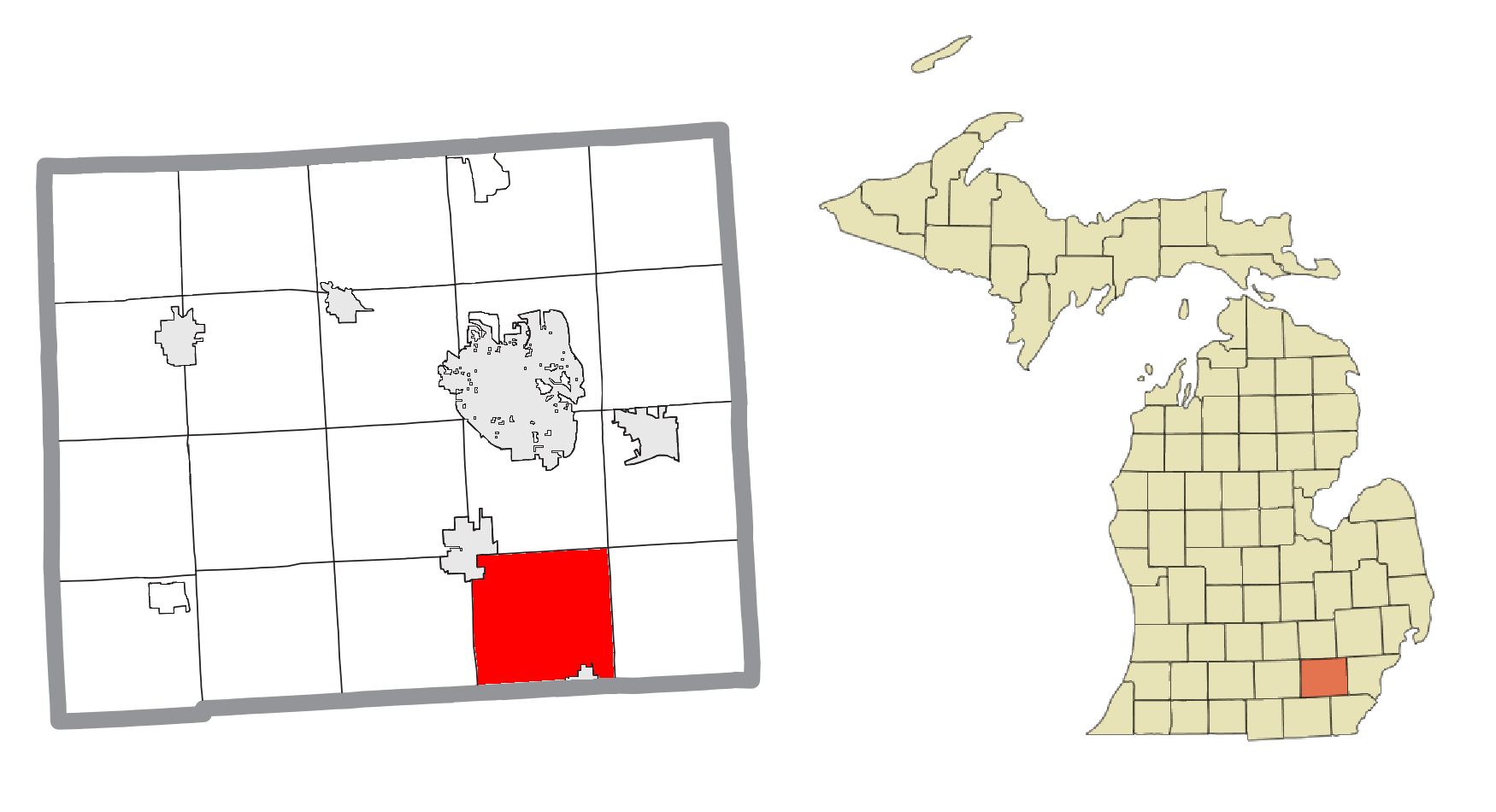
- Location within Washtenaw County

- Location within the state of Michigan Location within the United States
- Coordinates: 42°08′04″N 83°42′35″W
- Country: United States
- State: Michigan
- County: Washtenaw
- Established: 1834

Government
  - Supervisor: Chuck Tellas
  - Clerk: Mitch Gasche

Area
  - Total: 34.86 sq mi (90.29 km^{2})
  - Land: 34.70 sq mi (89.87 km^{2})
  - Water: 0.16 sq mi (0.41 km^{2})
- Elevation: 732 ft (223 m)

Population (2020)
  - Total: 9,108
  - Density: 262.5/sq mi (101.3/km^{2})
- Time zone: UTC-5 (Eastern (EST))
  - Summer (DST): UTC-4 (EDT)
- ZIP code(s): 48160 (Milan); 48176 (Saline); 48197 (Ypsilanti)
- Area code: 734
- FIPS code: 26-89100
- GNIS feature ID: 1627299
- Website: Official website

York Charter Township is a charter township of Washtenaw County in the U.S. state of Michigan. The population was 9,108 at the 2020 census.

The township is located north of the city of Milan and is home to the Federal Correctional Institution, Milan, which carried out the only capital punishment sentence in the state's history when Tony Chebatoris was executed in 1938.

== Communities ==
- Mooreville is an unincorporated community located in the southwest portion of the township at 42°06′11″N 83°44′00″W.
- Nora is a former settlement that had a station along the Toledo & Ann Arbor Railroad and also had its own post office from January 28, 1879, until March 19, 1887.
- Urania is a historic community within the township. A railroad station was established here by the Toledo & Ann Arbor Railroad in 1878, and a post office was established on January 10, 1879. The post office operated until January 31, 1914.

== History ==
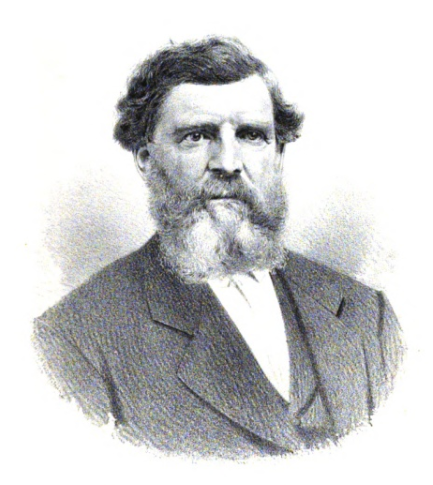
Othniel Gooding, the first clerk of York Township

The area that is now York Township was first settled in 1824, and organized into York Township on March 7, 1834. The township was named York due to the large number of residents originating from New York. The township's first clerk was Othniel Gooding.

The Federal Correctional Institution, Milan was built in 1933 in York Township. The prison is notable for carrying out the only execution in the state's history, despite the state abolishing the death penalty in 1847. Tony Chebatoris, who was convicted on federal charges related to bank robbery and murder, received the death penalty at Milan in 1938. He is buried at Marble Park Cemetery in York Township.

York Township was an original 36-square-mile (93 km^{2}) survey township until small segments of the township were later incorporated into portions of the city of Saline in 1966 and Milan in 1967.

In 2004, Toyota opened the Toyota Technical Center in the township. The state passed legislation permitting the sale of 690 acres (280 ha) of land in the township to Toyota for a research and development facility. The expanded technical center was scheduled to open in 2008.

== Geography ==
According to the U.S. Census Bureau, the township has a total area of 34.86 square miles (90.29 km^{2}), of which 34.70 square miles (89.87 km^{2}) is land and 0.16 square miles (0.41 km^{2}) (0.46%) is water.

The Saline River flows through the southwest portion of the township.

=== Major highways ===
- US 23 runs south–north through the eastern portion of the township.

== Demographics ==
As of the census of 2000, there were 7,392 people, 1,901 households, and 1,608 families residing in the township. The population density was 210.2 inhabitants per square mile (81.2/km^{2}). There were 1,936 housing units at an average density of 55.1 per square mile (21.3/km^{2}). The racial makeup of the township was 83.75% White, 12.72% African American, 0.26% Native American, 1.04% Asian, 0.01% Pacific Islander, 0.84% from other races, and 1.38% from two or more races. Hispanic or Latino of any race were 4.06% of the population.

There were 1,901 households, out of which 42.2% had children under the age of 18 living with them, 78.1% were married couples living together, 4.0% had a female householder with no husband present, and 15.4% were non-families. 11.7% of all households were made up of individuals, and 4.2% had someone living alone who was 65 years of age or older. The average household size was 2.97 and the average family size was 3.23.

In the township the population was spread out, with 22.5% under the age of 18, 6.3% from 18 to 24, 38.3% from 25 to 44, 26.9% from 45 to 64, and 6.0% who were 65 years of age or older. The median age was 37 years. For every 100 females, there were 160.6 males. For every 100 females age 18 and over, there were 182.5 males.

The median income for a household in the township was $84,232, and the median income for a family was $91,986. Males had a median income of $52,788 versus $36,189 for females. The per capita income for the township was $25,528. About 3.5% of families and 3.8% of the population were below the poverty line, including 3.8% of those under age 18 and 10.4% of those age 65 or over.

== Education ==
York Township is served by three public school districts. The south and eastern portion of the township is served by Milan Area Schools, while the northwestern portion is served by Saline Area Schools. Lincoln Consolidated School District also serves very small segments of the eastern portion of the township.

South Arbor Academy is a National Heritage Academies charter school operated by Central Michigan University. The school opened in 1999.

== Parks and recreation ==
Two parks are operated by the township.

The 125-acre (51 ha) Sandra Richardson Park has soccer fields leased to the Saline Area Soccer Association, three walking trails, a 32-by-40-foot (9.8 by 12.2 m) picnic pavilion north of the park's parking lot, a sheltered picnic table, the historic Judd Road Bridge, two bridges crossing wet areas of the trails, a shelter gazebo located at the intersection of the three trails, and portable toilets. A 1.4-mile (2.3 km) walking trail opened in 2002, while a second trail opened in 2003. Boy Scout Eagle projects led to the installation of the picnic tables and bridges. In 2004 the York Township Parks and Recreation Community applied for a grant from the Michigan National Resources Trust Fund. The grant was awarded in 2005. The township used the grant funds and local match funds to build the pavilion and surface several park trails to make them compliant with the Americans with Disabilities Act of 1990. The township also installed a handicapped parking pad near the pavilion, built the gazebo, and installed portable toilets. The township reseeded 5 acres (2.0 ha) of prairie with native grasses and wildflowers. The township re-installed the Judd Road Bridge. A boardwalk was built from a Boy Scout Eagle project. In 2005 the State of Michigan gave an additional 10 acres (4.0 ha) of land to the park.

The 38-acre (15 ha) Mary McCann Park consists of an open field and a wooded area, each taking about half of the park grounds. The park includes a 1-mile (1.6 km) walking/nature trail built in 2003 and a trail extension carved by a Boy Scout from Saline. Another Boy Scout built an open field and a pond. A teaching station for 30 students overlooks the field and pond.

== Notable people ==
- Tony Chebatoris, inmate at FCI Milan, executed and buried in York Township
- Rich Rodriguez, football coach for the Michigan Wolverines football team from 2008 to 2010, lived in York Township.
- Mary Frances Tyler Tucker, poet, born in York Township
- Mary Collins Whiting, lawyer, entrepreneur, and teacher, born in York Township

== Images ==
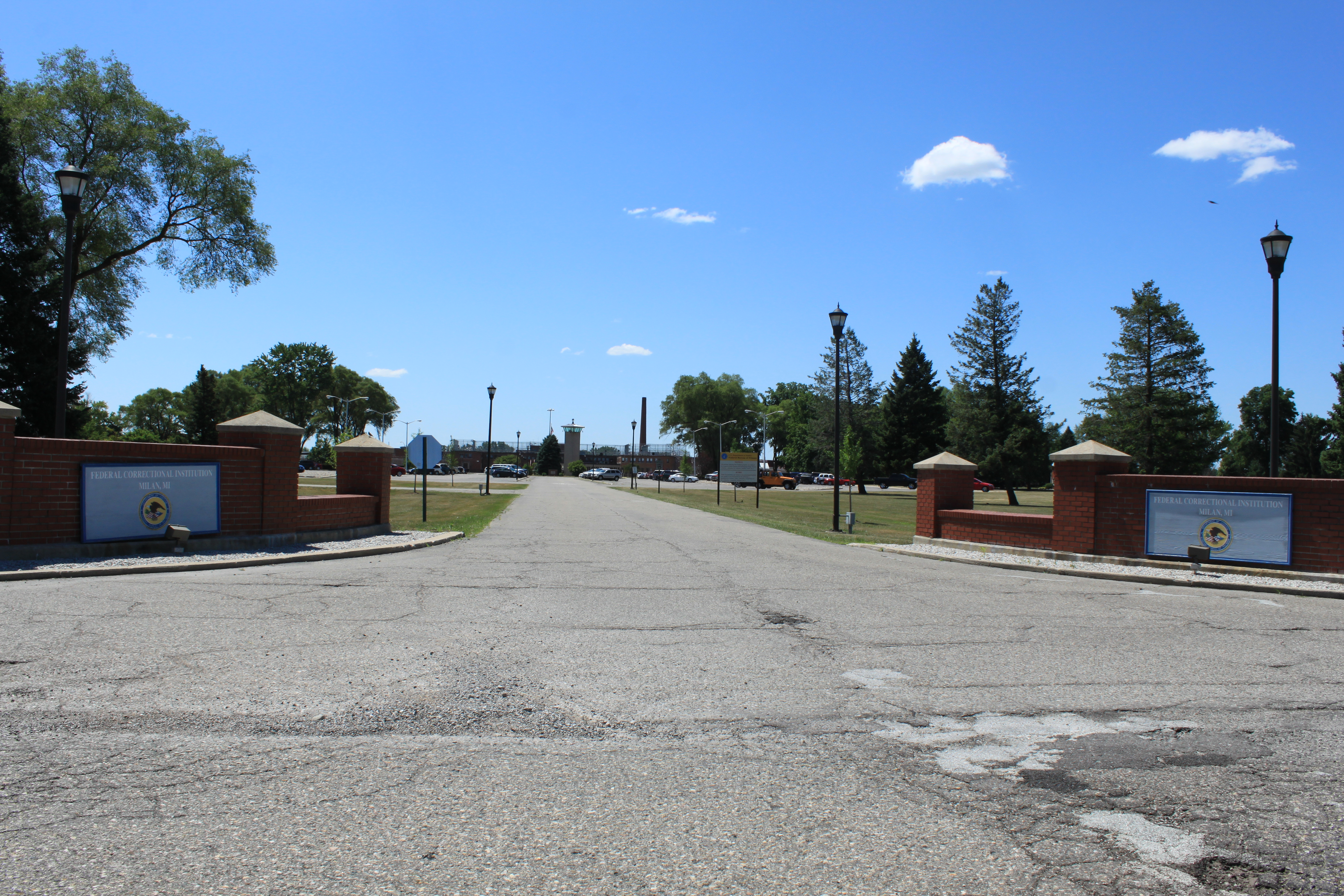
Federal Correctional Institution, Milan

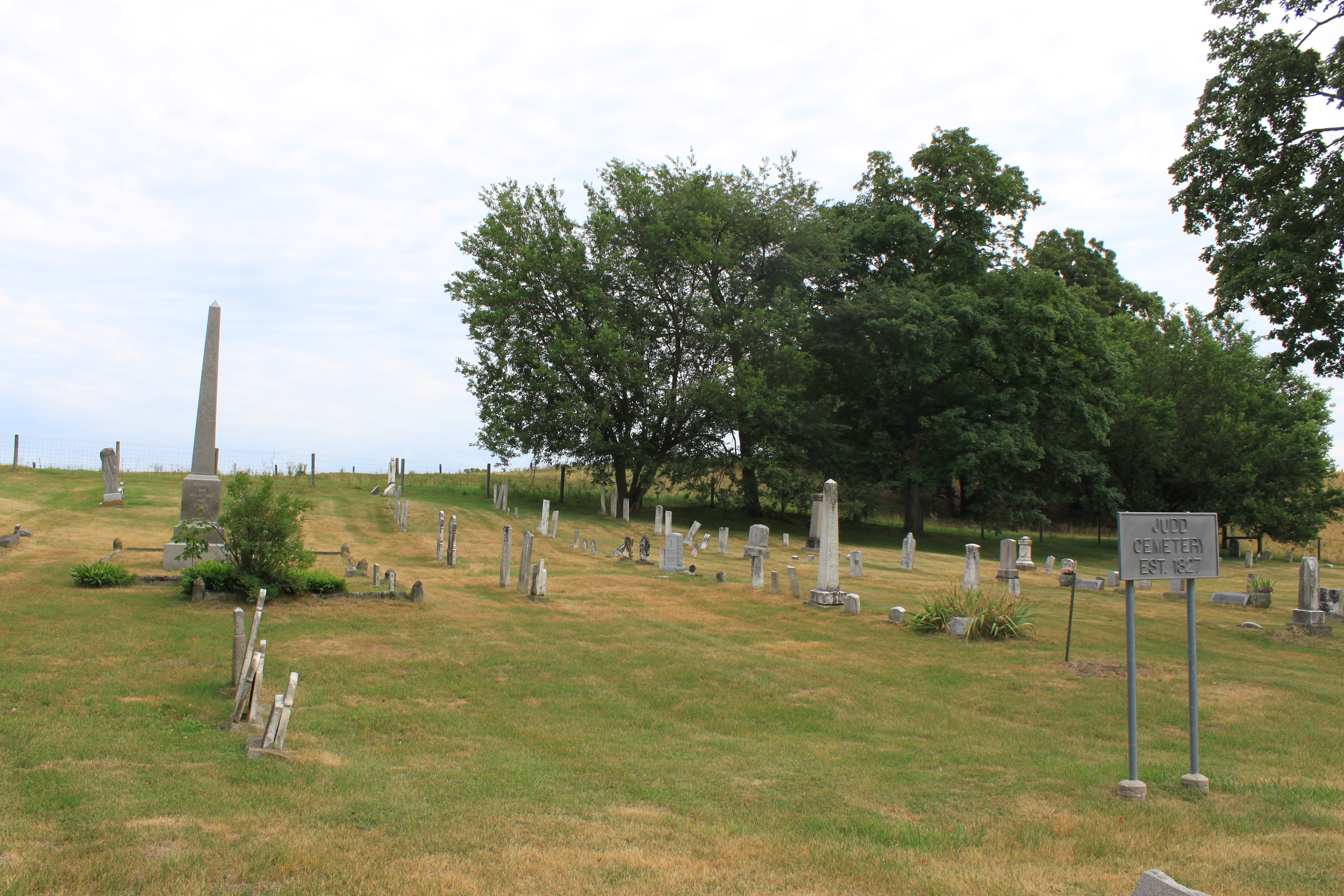
Historic Judd Cemetery

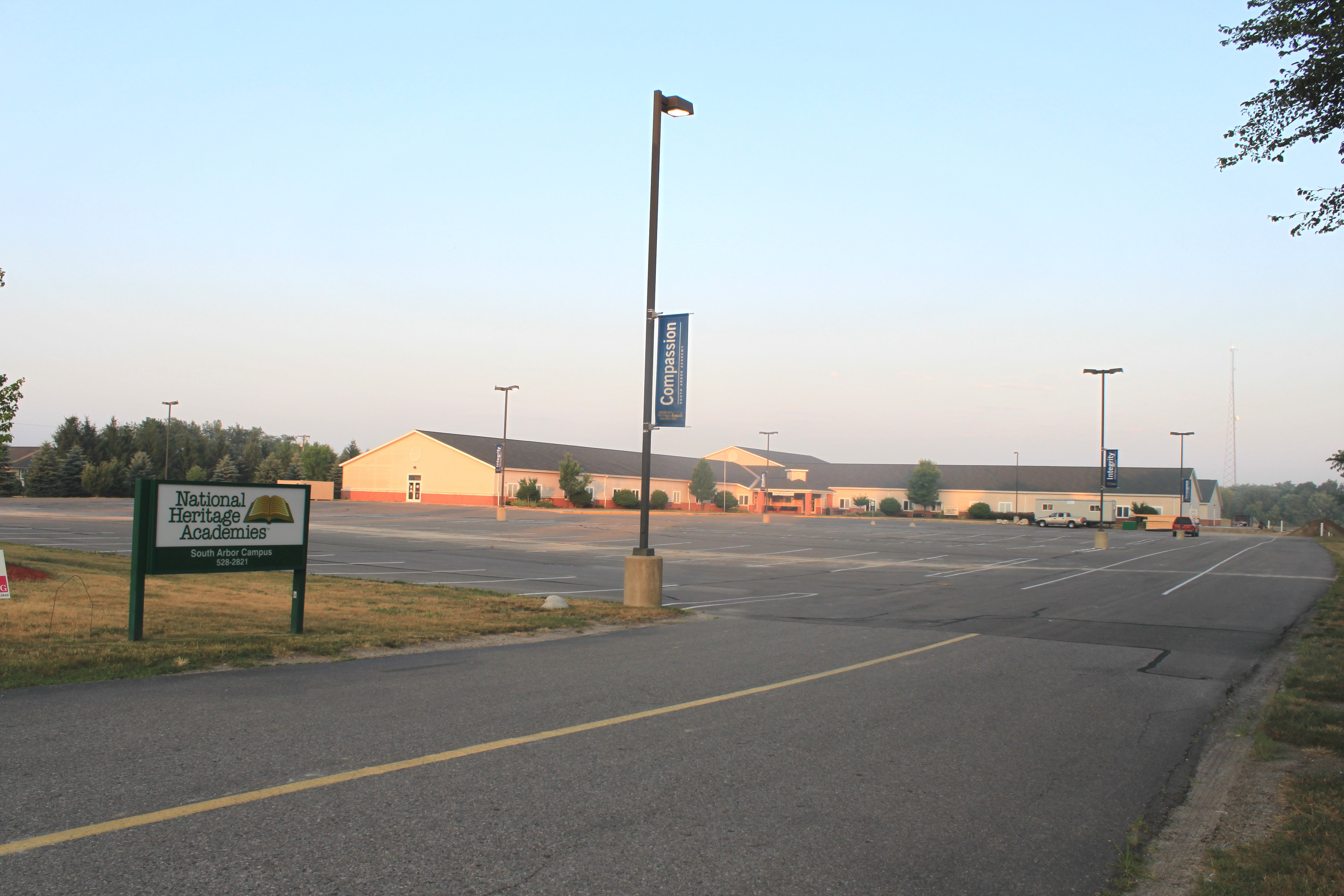
South Arbor Charter Academy
