= Residential Drug Abuse Program =

Rehabilitation program offered by US Bureau of Prisons

The Residential Drug Abuse Program (RDAP) is an intensive nine-month, 500-hour substance use disorder rehabilitation program administered by the United States Federal Bureau of Prisons (BOP), offered to federal prisoners who qualify and voluntarily elect to enroll. Upon successful completion of the program, prisoners who meet the necessary criteria are eligible for up to a 12-month reduction of their sentence and possibly six months in a halfway house depending on how many months they have left on their sentence. Due to the high demand and insufficient spots, inmates are placed on a waiting list typically when they have 12 months or less time left on their sentence and are accepted when there is an opening. This is part of the reason why inmates receive different amounts of time off their sentences. For example, if an inmate has waited for a slot until he has 12 months left and the program is six months long, then he only receives six months off his sentence and so forth. Michael Vick was rumored to have entered the program while serving out his sentence at the United States Penitentiary, Leavenworth, Kansas.

Violent offenses normally disqualify defendants from the early release portion of the program. Felony or misdemeanor convictions for homicide, forcible rape, robbery, aggravated assault, and child sexual abuses all render a prisoner ineligible to participate. Bad behavior and regular rule breaking will definitely lead to expulsion from the Residential Drug Abuse Program

The program is open to inmates with a documented history of substance use in the 12-month period prior to arrest for the sentence they are currently serving. It is authorized in 18 U.S.C. § 3621. RDAP is only available to inmates in federal prisons; state prisoners are not eligible to participate.

Research commissioned by the BOP revealed lower rates of recidivism and a higher quality of life upon returning to civilian life for offenders who successfully complete the program.
