= Mooresville =

Mooresville may refer to several places, all in the United States:

- Mooresville, Alabama, a town
- Mooresville, Indiana, a town
- Mooreville, Michigan, an unincorporated community sometimes spelled "Mooresville"
- Mooresville, Missouri, a village
- Mooresville, North Carolina, a town
- Mooresville, Ohio, an unincorporated community
- Mooresville, Tennessee, an unincorporated community
- Mooresville, West Virginia, an unincorporated community

== See also ==
- Mooreville (disambiguation)
