= Huron League (MHSAA) =

The Huron League (founded as the Huron Valley League) is an MHSAA athletic conference located in southeastern Michigan.

== Members ==
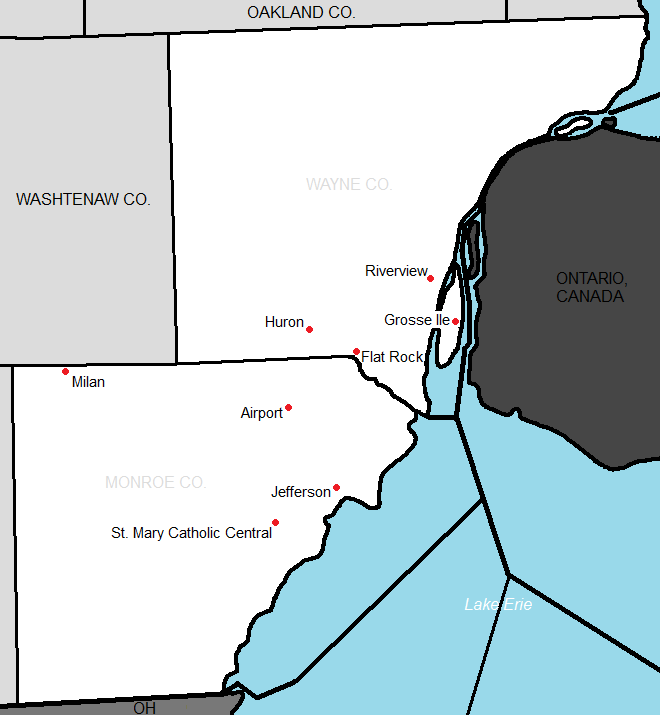
Locations of the members of the Huron League.

The following schools are currently members:

School	Nickname	Enrollment	Colors	Address
Airport	Jets	760	Blue & Gold	11300 Grafton Rd. Carleton, MI 48117
Flat Rock	Rams	476	Green & Gold	25600 Seneca St. Flat Rock, MI 48134
Grosse Ile	Red Devils	525	Scarlet & Gray	7800 Grays Dr. Grosse Ile, MI 48138
Huron	Chiefs	797	Red & White	32077 Huron River Dr. New Boston, MI 48164
Jefferson	Bears	475	Blue & Gold	5707 Williams Rd. Monroe, MI 48162
Milan	Big Reds	602	Red & Black	200 Big Red Dr. Milan, MI 48160
Riverview	Pirates	875	Maroon & Gold	12431 Longsdorf; Riverview, MI 48193
St. Mary Catholic Central	Falcons/Kestrels	324	Green & Gold	108 W Elm Ave. Monroe, MI 48162

=== Former members ===
The following schools are former members:

School	Nickname	Location	Joined	Previous Conference	Departed	Successive Conference
Ann Arbor University High	Cubs	Ann Arbor	1929		1959	Washtenaw County Conference
Chelsea	Bulldogs	Chelsea	1929		1959	Washtenaw County Conference
Clinton	Redskins	Clinton	1929	Lenawee County Athletic Association	1939	Lenawee County Athletic Association
Dundee	Vikings	Dundee	1929	Tri-County Athletic Association	1964	Southeastern Conference
Milan (Rejoined 2000)	Big Reds	Milan	1929	Tri-County Athletic Association	1967	Southeastern Conference
Saline	Hornets	Pittsfield Charter Township	1929		1959	Washtenaw County Conference
Ypsilanti Lincoln	Railsplitters	Augusta Charter Township	1929	Tri-County Athletic Association	1964	Southeastern Conference
Ypsilanti Roosevelt	Rough Riders	Ypsilanti	1929		1959	Washtenaw County Conference
Belleville	Tigers	Belleville	1932		1945	
Tecumseh	Indians	Tecumseh	1935; 1959	Lenawee County Athletic Association; Southeastern Michigan Conference	1939; 1980	Lenawee County Athletic Association; Southeastern Conference
Romulus	Eagles	Romulus	1939		1948	
Blissfield	Royals	Blissfield	1959	Lenawee County Athletic Association	1973	Michigan-Ohio Border Conference
Gibraltar Carlson	Marauders	Gibraltar	1968	Lakeshore Conference	1993	Michigan Mega Conference

== See also ==
Michigan High School Athletic Association
