= Azalia, Michigan =

- Unincorporated community
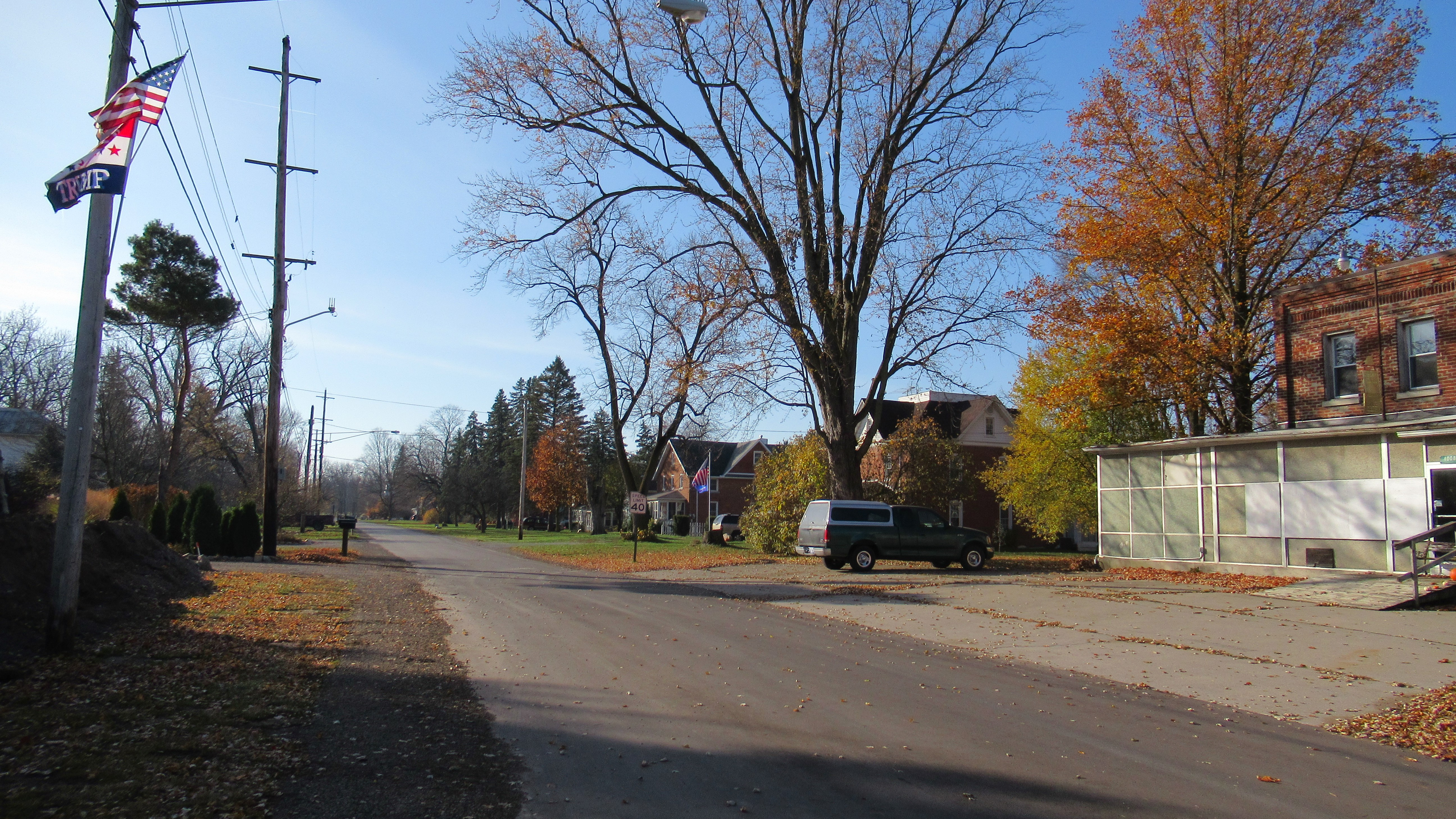
- Looking south along Dundee Azalia Road

- Location within the state of Michigan Location within the United States
- Coordinates: 42°01′08″N 83°39′57″W
- Country: United States
- State: Michigan
- County: Monroe
- Township: Milan
- Established: 1869
- Elevation: 669 ft (204 m)
- Time zone: UTC-5 (Eastern (EST))
  - Summer (DST): UTC-4 (EDT)
- ZIP code(s): 48110; 48131 (Dundee); 48159 (Maybee)
- Area code: 734
- GNIS feature ID: 620397

Azalia is an unincorporated community in Monroe County in the U.S. state of Michigan. The community is located within Milan Township just east of U.S. Route 23.

As an unincorporated community, Azalia has no legally defined boundaries or population statistics of its own. Azalia does have its own post office box services using the 48110 ZIP Code, but the community no longer has its own physical post office building.

== Geography ==
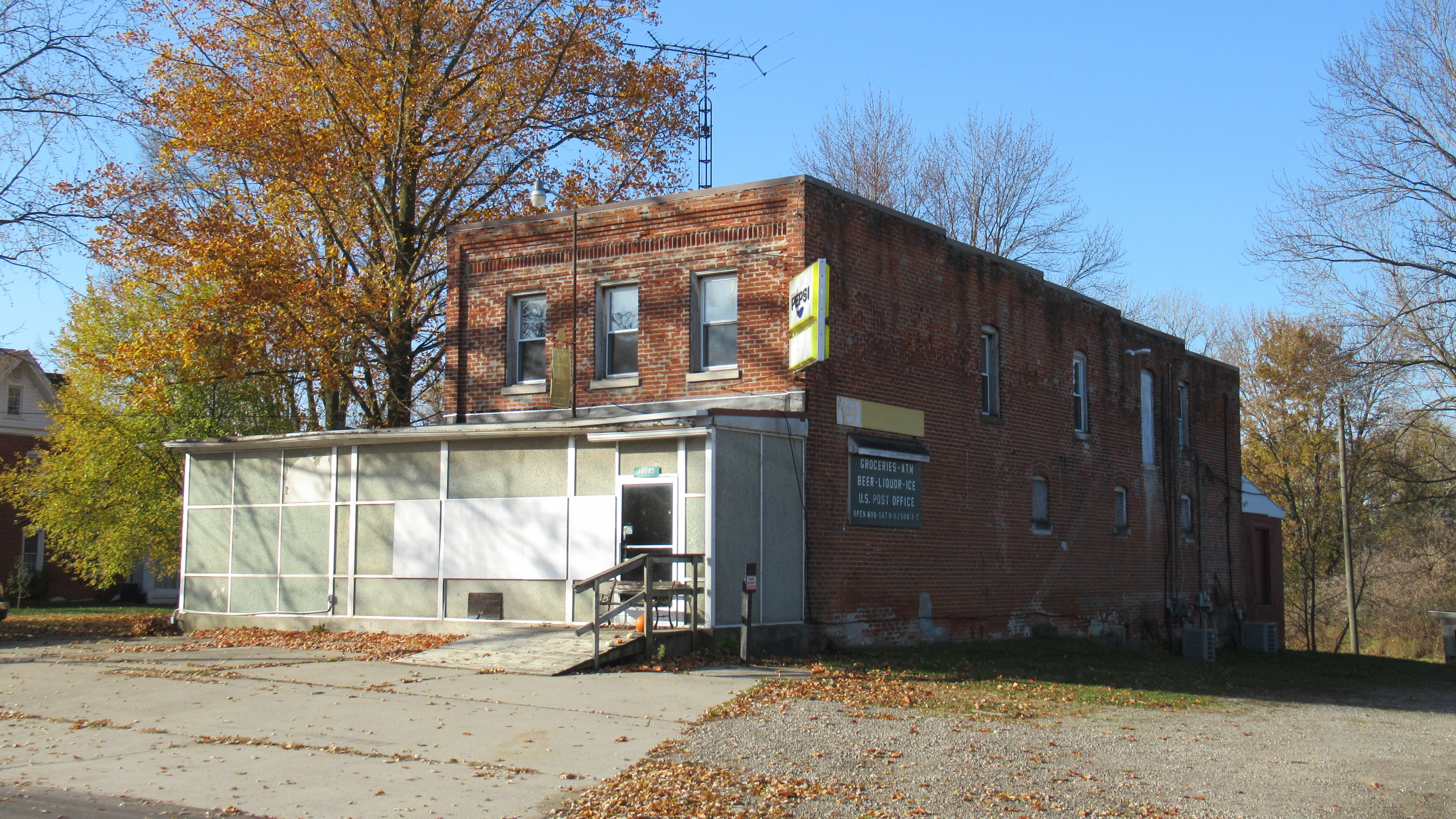
Former U.S. Post Office in Azalia

Azalia is a small rural community located in Milan Township in northwestern Monroe County about 5.0 miles (8.0 km) south of the city of Milan. The community sits at an elevation of 669 feet (204 m) above sea level.

U.S. Route 23 (US 23) runs south–north along the west side of the community, and Azalia is accessible via Cone Road exit 22. The North Branch of the Macon Creek flows directly through the community, and Bear Swamp Creek branches off in the area. The Saline River flows to the east. Several railroad lines run through the area, and a single line of the Watco division of the Ann Arbor Railroad passes through the community. The line connects Toledo to Ann Arbor, although Azalia no longer has any rail services. The nearest unincorporated communities include Cone to the west, Rea to the southwest, and London to the east. The city of Milan is directly to the north, and the village of Dundee is about 4.0 miles (6.4 km) to the south.

Azalia has its own post office box service using the 48110 ZIP Code, although the community no longer contains its own physical post office location after it was discontinued in 2005. The ZIP Code remains active and is now handled by the post office in the nearby city of Monroe. For mail delivery purposes, Azalia is served by two separate ZIP Codes. Most of the community is served by the Maybee 48159 ZIP Code, while portions to the south and west may be served by the Dundee 48131 ZIP Code. Azalia is served by Milan Area Schools to north, while some areas to the south might be served by Dundee Community Schools.

== History ==
Former train depot in Azalia

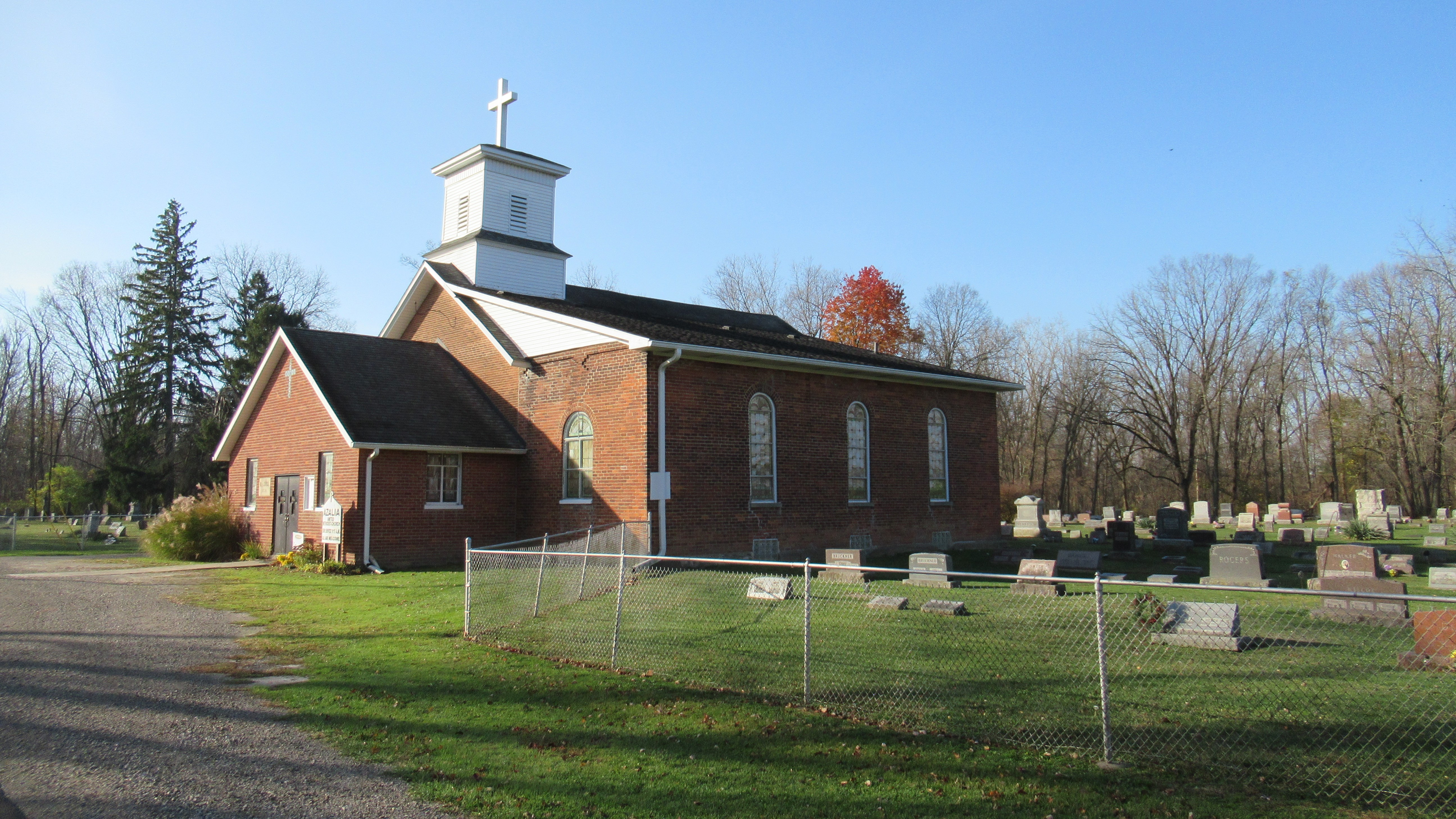
Azalia–United Methodist Church

This area in southeastern Milan Township was sparsely populated until a post office was established here on August 4, 1869. The post office was named East Milan due to its location, and Stephen Frink served as the first postmaster. On the same date, another post office opened as West Milan (later renamed Cone) in the western portion of the township.

East Milan began to grow after Sayre Reeves and his son William established the Star Bending Company in the area. Originally from New York, the large Reeves family settled in the area and built their home in the center of the community. In the 1870s, the Toledo, Ann Arbor and North Michigan Railway constructed a railway line directly through the community, and East Milan grew as a small lumbering community. Due to Reeves family presence, the community became known as Reeves Station, and a rail depot was built here as a stopover between the village of Dundee to the south and the community of Milan to the north. East Milan received its first Methodist church building in 1870, although the congregation had been present in the area since at least 1850.

The East Milan post office and Reeves Station can be seen in the southeast section of an 1876 map of Milan Township. The post office and train depot were renamed to Azalia on September 1, 1887. Although the exact origins of this name are unknown, it may have been named after the daughter of a railroad executive. In 1889, Azalia suffered a catastrophic fire that destroyed at least 22 buildings in the community, and later that year, a smallpox epidemic closed school and church for three weeks. Azalia received electricity in 1924. By early 1948, U.S. Route 23 was rerouted to provide a direct route through Azalia.

The original 1870 church building remains active and is currently operating as the Azalia–United Methodist Church located at 9855 Dundee Azalia Road in the center of the community. The Ann Arbor Railroad line continues to run through the Azalia, although the community no longer has a train depot or railway services. The Azalia main post office remained in full operation until June 18, 1988. At that point, it was transferred to a branch office of the nearby city of Monroe. A community post office handling mailing operations and post office box services remained open within a private business in Azalia. The community post office was discontinued on December 3, 2005. The Azalia postal name and its 48110 ZIP Code remains active and is now handled entirely by other post office locations.
