= Mooreville, Michigan =

- Unincorporated community
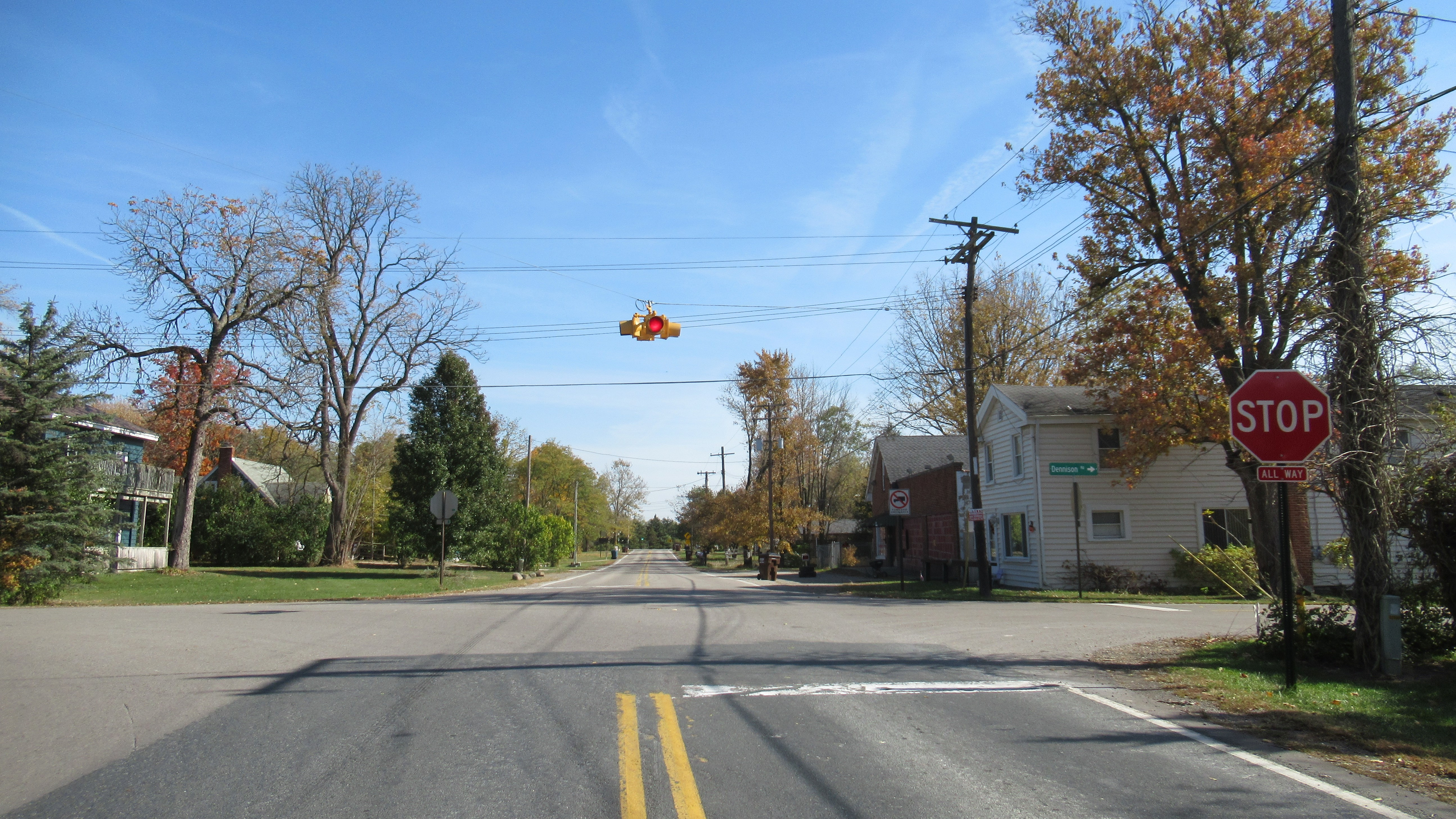
- Dennison / Stony Creek at Mooreville Road

- Location within the state of Michigan Location within the United States
- Coordinates: 42°06′11″N 83°44′00″W
- Country: United States
- State: Michigan
- County: Washtenaw
- Township: York
- Settled: 1826
- Elevation: 722 ft (220 m)
- Time zone: UTC-5 (Eastern (EST))
  - Summer (DST): UTC-4 (EDT)
- ZIP code(s): 48160 (Milan)
- Area code: 734
- GNIS feature ID: 632661

Mooreville is an unincorporated community in Washtenaw County in the U.S. state of Michigan. The community is located within York Township. As an unincorporated community, Mooreville has no legally defined boundaries or population statistics of its own.

== Geography ==
Mooreville is located in York Township in Washtenaw County about 3.0 miles (4.8 km) northwest of the city of Milan just north of the county line with Monroe County.

The rural community is centered along Mooreville Road at an intersection with Stony Creek Road running west and Dennison Road running east. The Saline River meanders through the community. In addition to Milan, the other nearest city is Saline about 8.0 miles (12.9 km) the northwest. Other nearby unincorporated communities include Azalia and Cone to the south, Stony Creek to the northeast, and Benton and Macon to the west.

Mooreville does not have its own post office anymore and is served by the Milan 48160 ZIP Code, in which the name Mooreville is not used for mail delivery. The community is served by Milan Area Schools.

In 2021, the Mooreville Riverbend Preserve was inaugurated as an 11-acre (4.5 ha) nature reserve along the Saline River. The land was previously private property but was purchased by the township and the Washtenaw County Parks & Recreation Commission at a cost of $89,000. The park consists of a rustic parking lot and walking trail along the riverbend of the river, and future plans include a small boat launch, paved parking lot, fishing deck, and other amenities.

== History ==
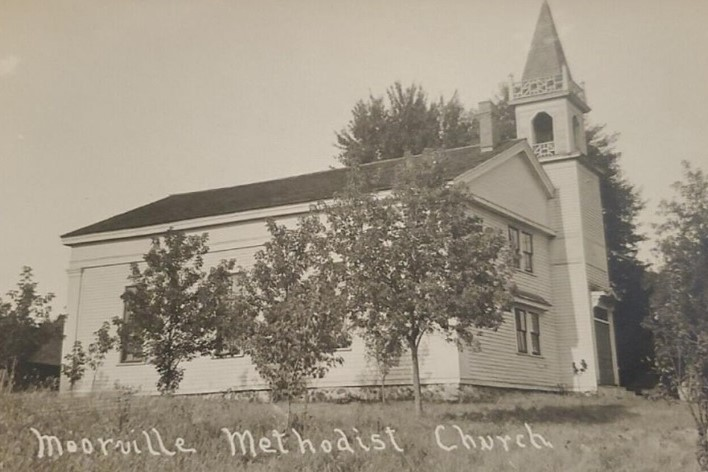
Mooreville Methodist Church in 1912

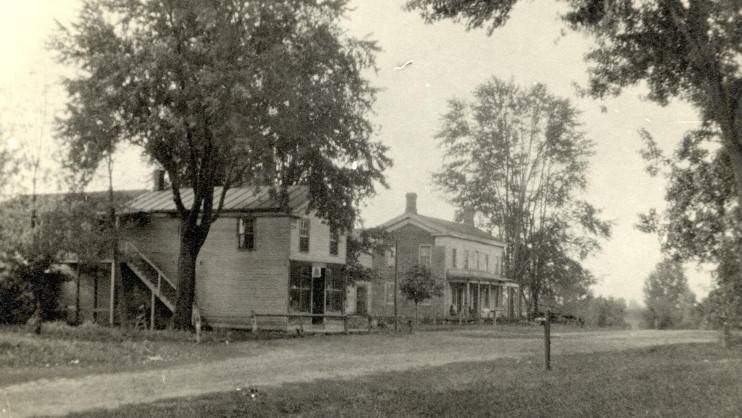
Historic image of Mooreville from 1916

Road signage for the community states Mooreville as being established as early as 1826, which was the same year that Washtenaw County was established in the Michigan Territory. The first recorded resident to the area was John L. Moore around 1830, which makes Mooreville one of the county's oldest settlements. Moore came from the state of New York and settled near the Saline River. A post office named Mooreville opened on January 5, 1833 with Moore serving as the first postmaster. The post office was renamed York on May 2, 1834 after the newly established township, in which many of the first settlers came from New York. In some records, the community is spelled as Mooresville.

When Moore settled in the area, he built his log cabin at the corner of what is now Stony Creek and Mooreville Road. Isaac Hathaway built the first sawmill in Mooreville in 1832. The Baptist Church of Mooreville was founded in 1832 and consisted of about 10 members with Moore later building the first church on his own property. In 1838, a second sawmill was built, and the community "furnished all of the lumber for buildings in Washtenaw County at the time." The community also became an important stop along the stagecoach route that connected Adrian, Jackson, and Detroit. The Mooreville Methodist Church was founded in 1849 and also constructed on Moore's property along the Saline River. By 1881, the community was thriving and outpacing nearby Milan in prosperity. Mooreville contained a cheese factory, cider mill, a steam-powered sawmill, two general stores, five churches, several shops, a saloon, hotel, and school.

In the 1880s, the Toledo, Ann Arbor and North Michigan Railway and the Wabash Railroad began constructing railway lines through the area. The railway lines bypassed Mooreville in favor of Milan, which led to the decline of Mooreville and a surge of development and growth for Milan. The remaining businesses and churches soon left Mooreville. The York post office in Mooreville closed on April 30, 1907. Automotive magnate Henry Ford planned to purchase several plots of land along the Saline River in hopes of damming the river, as well as restoring the dilapidated hotel. He was unable to purchase all the private property necessary and instead built his mill in Milan. The Mooreville Methodist Church was the last operating church in the community when it closed by 1962 and fell into disrepair. By 1972, the community had about 50 residents.

== Images ==
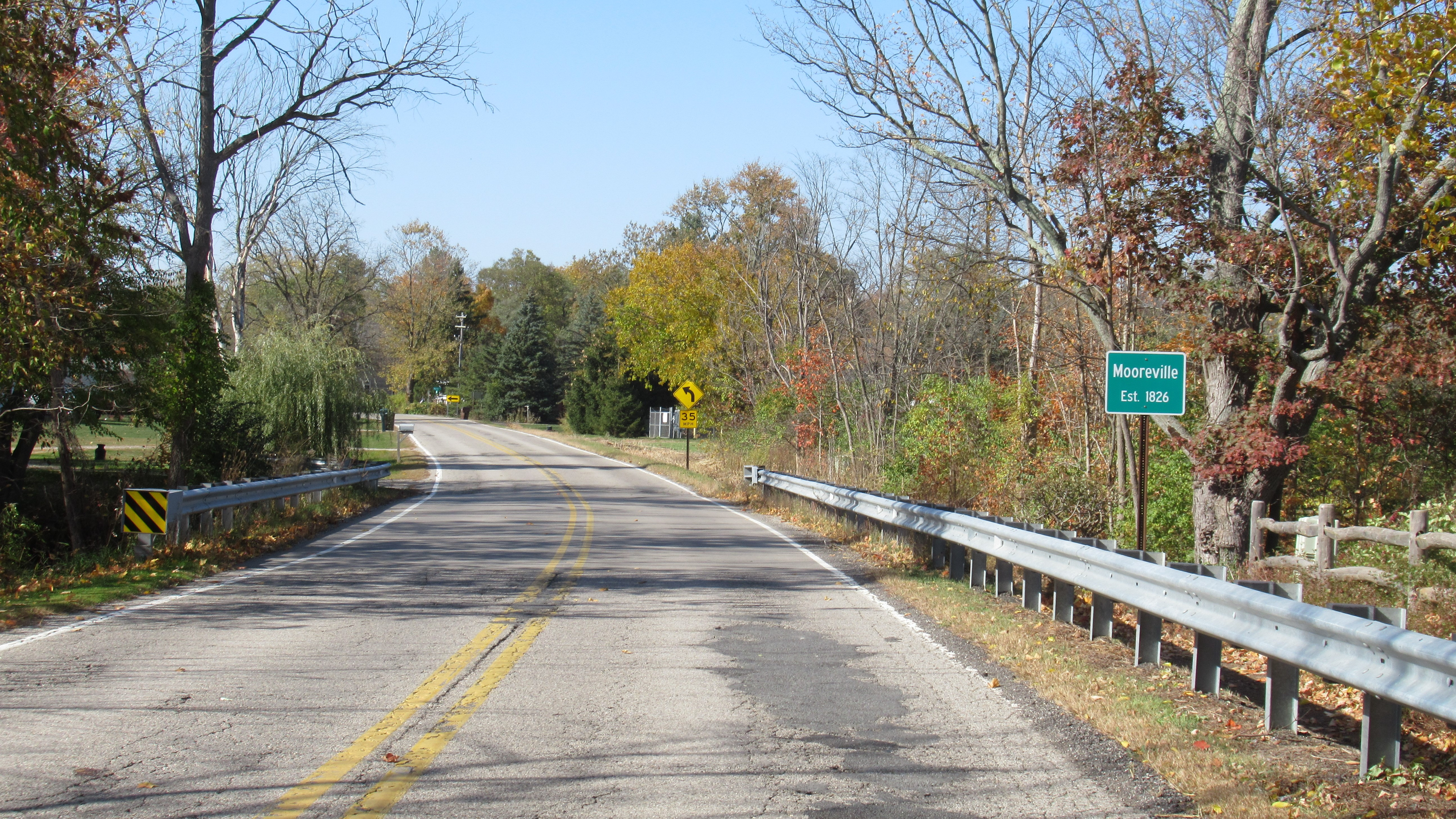
Road signage along Stony Creek Road

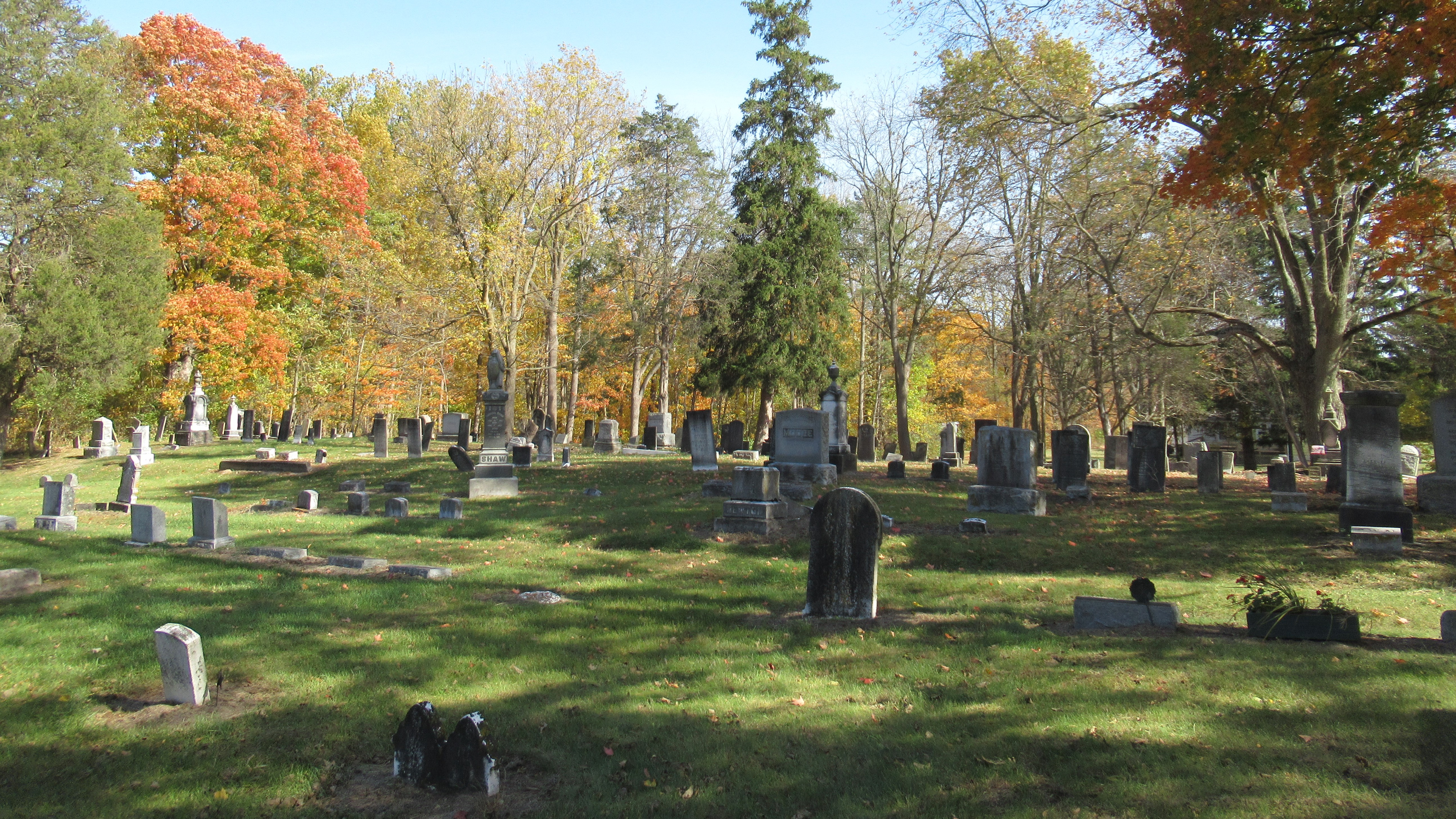
Mooreville Cemetery

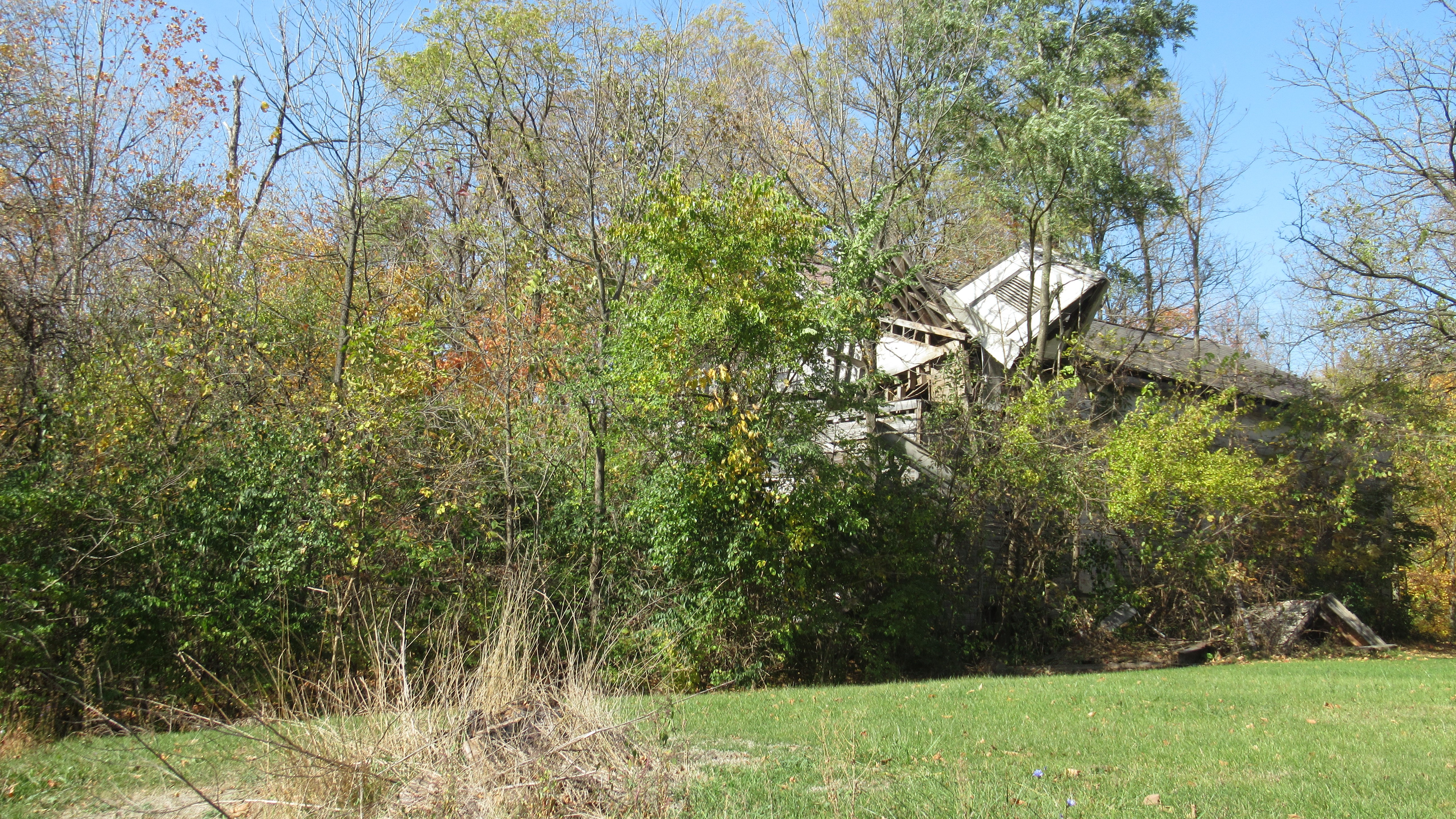
Decaying Methodist church (2022)
