= Cone, Michigan =

- Unincorporated community
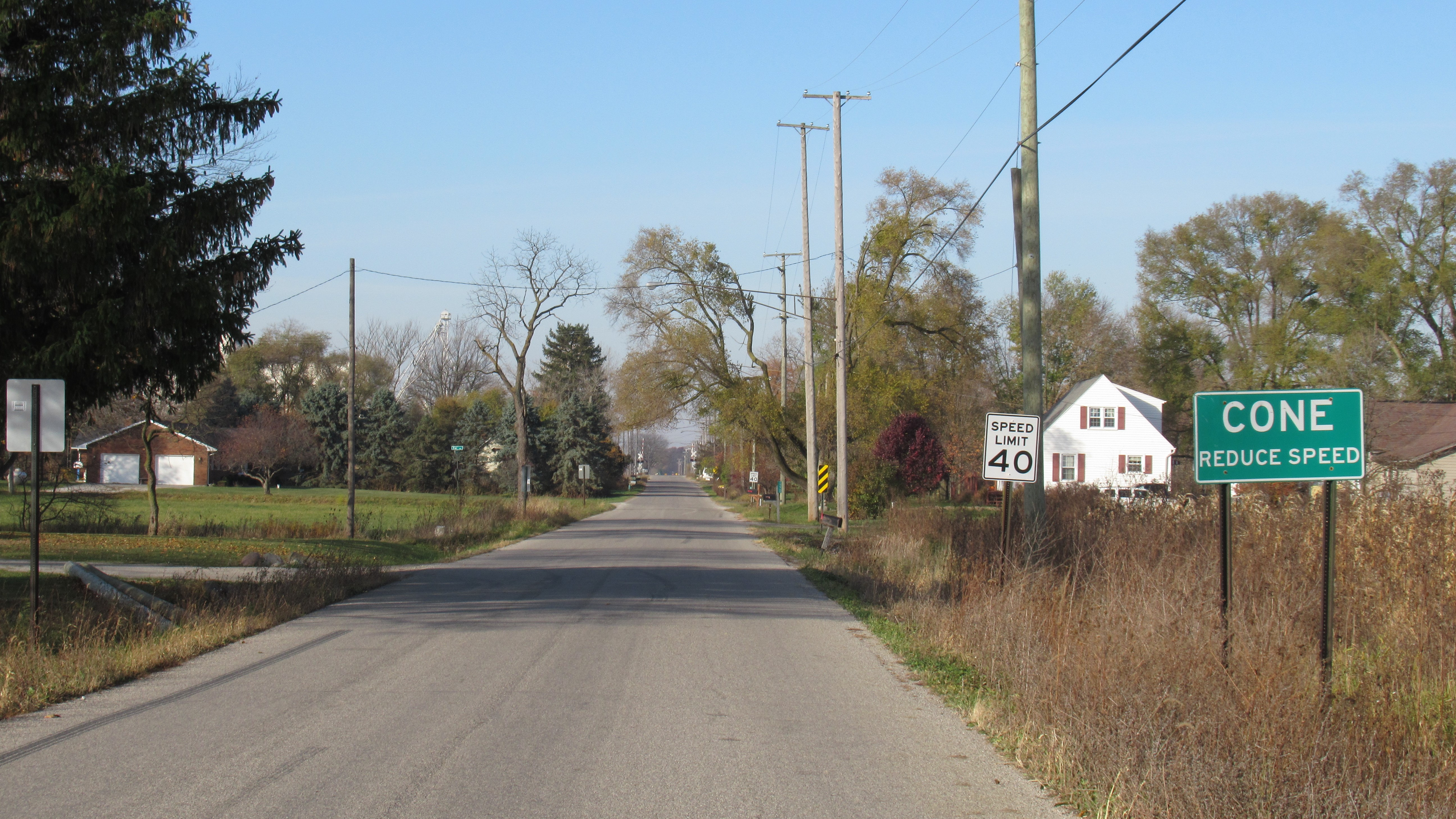
- Looking west along Cone Road

- Location within the state of Michigan Location within the United States
- Coordinates: 42°01′55″N 83°45′11″W
- Country: United States
- State: Michigan
- County: Monroe
- Township: Milan
- Settled: 1835
- Elevation: 696 ft (212 m)
- Time zone: UTC-5 (Eastern (EST))
  - Summer (DST): UTC-4 (EDT)
- ZIP code(s): 48160 (Milan); 49229 (Britton)
- Area code: 734
- GNIS feature ID: 623689

Cone is an unincorporated community in Monroe County in the U.S. state of Michigan. The community is located within Milan Township. As an unincorporated community, Cone has no legally defined boundaries or population statistics of its own.

== Geography ==
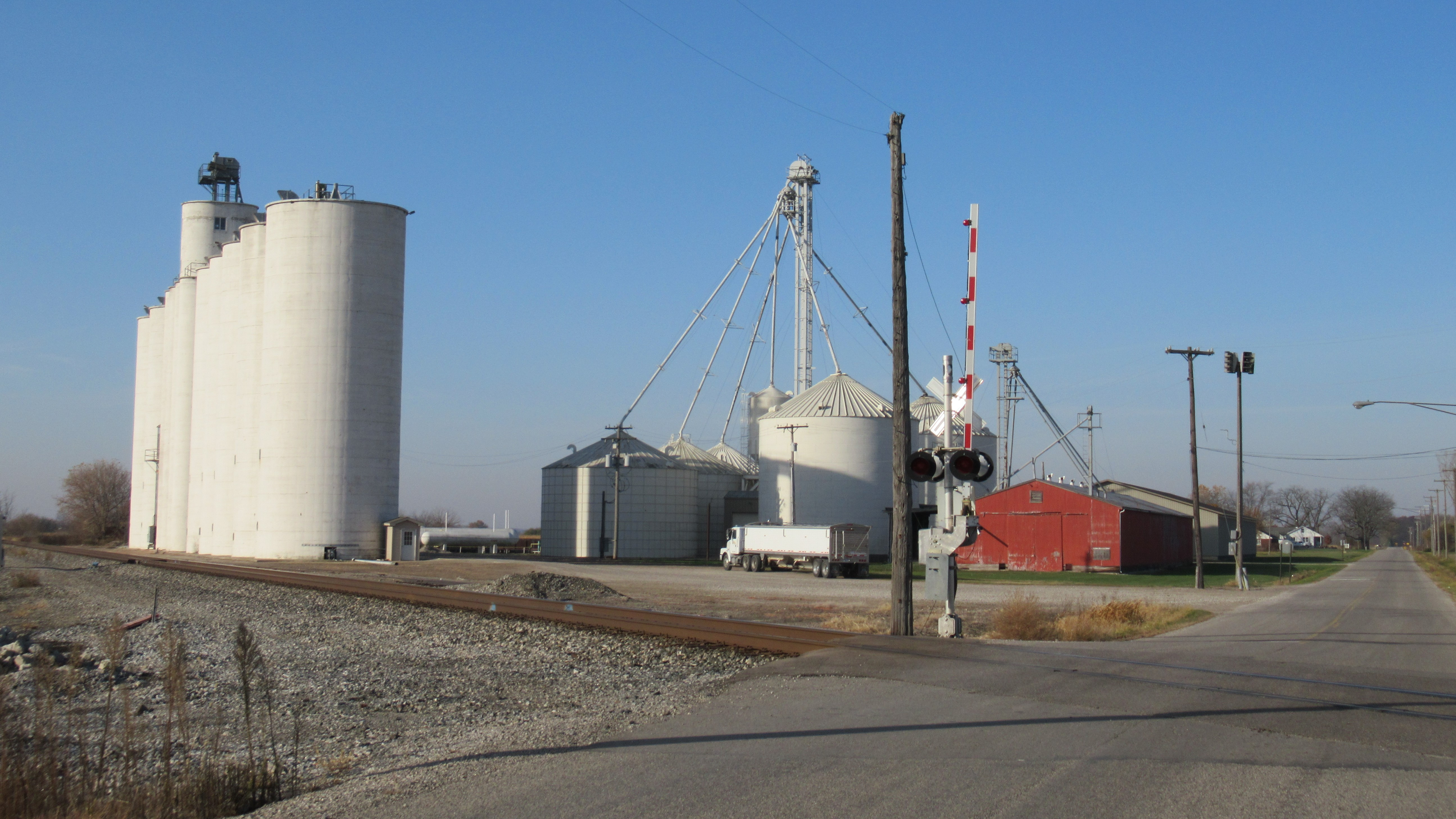
Grain elevator in the community

The community is centered along Cone Road in the northwest corner of Monroe County. It is located about four miles (6.4 km) west of U.S. Route 23 and is accessible via exit 22. Cone is about five miles (8.0 km) southwest of the city of Milan and 20 miles (32.2 km) west of the city of Monroe. The community sits at an elevation of 696 feet (212 m) above sea level. Bear Swamp Creek runs through the community of Cone.

Other nearby unincorporated communities include Mooreville to the north, Rea to the south, and Azalia to the east. The village of Britton is located to the southwest. Cone uses the Britton 49229 ZIP Code, which is mostly located in Lenawee County to the west. Eastern portions of the community may use the Milan 48160 ZIP Code. The community is served by Milan Area Schools to the northeast.

== History ==
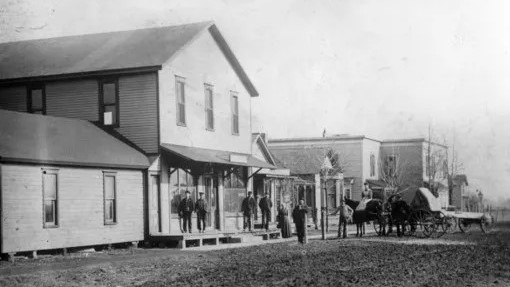
Historic image of Cone in 1907

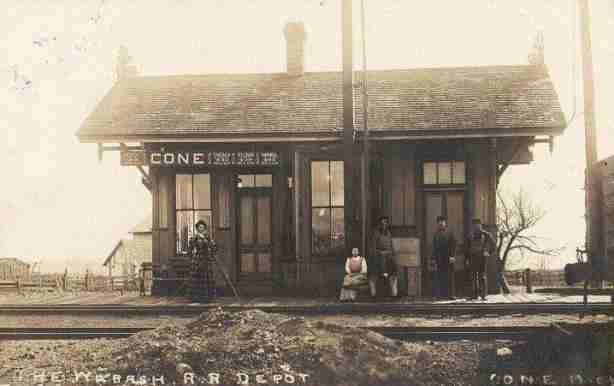
Former train depot in 1909

The area was first settled in 1835 by Erastus S. Cone (1798–1869), who bought farmland throughout Monroe County in the Michigan Territory. In 1836, his farmland in the northwest portion of the county became part of Milan Township. Cone had a very large family, and the name Cone became a prominent name in the area. Many settlers in the community belonged to the Cone family. The growing community became known as West Milan due to its location just southwest of the community of Milan. The community of Azalia—then known as East Milan—was in the opposite direction.

The area received its first post office under the name West Milan on August 4, 1869. John C. Cone served as the first postmaster. The community of West Milan appeared in an 1876 map of Milan Township. The Wabash Railroad opened a railway line in West Milan in 1880. Because of the prominence of the Cone family name, the station was named the Cone Station. The post office was renamed Cone on January 27, 1882.

With the opening of the railway, the community of Cone had a direct link to the city of Detroit about 47 miles (76 km) to the northeast. The small community began to prosper and included many businesses and a growing population that mostly belonged to the Cone family. Businesses within Cone included a blacksmith shop, brick and charcoal manufacturers, cheese factory, two churches, several stores, two sawmills, and other manufacturing companies. Despite the growing community and prosperous railway, many of these businesses disappeared after the turn of the century. The post office itself was discontinued on September 15, 1917. Today, the community consists of only a small number of houses, farmland, and a grain elevator and silos. The railway line is currently operated by Norfolk Southern Railway but no longer has a station in the area.

The Rice Cemetery is located near the Cone community. The cemetery has burial sites of many early Cone residents, including some Civil War veterans.
