= GIHS =

GIHS may refer to:

- Glenunga International High School, a school in Adelaide, South Australia
- Grand Island Senior High School (New York), a school in Grand Island, New York, U.S.
- Grosse Ile High School in Grosse Ile, Michigan, U.S.
