= Mooreville =

Mooreville is the name of several localities:

== Australia ==
- Mooreville, New South Wales

== United States ==
- Mooreville, Michigan
- Mooreville, Mississippi
- Mooreville, Texas
