= Main Street Historic District (Milan, Michigan) =

Historic district in Michigan, United States

- U.S. National Register of Historic Places
- U.S. Historic district
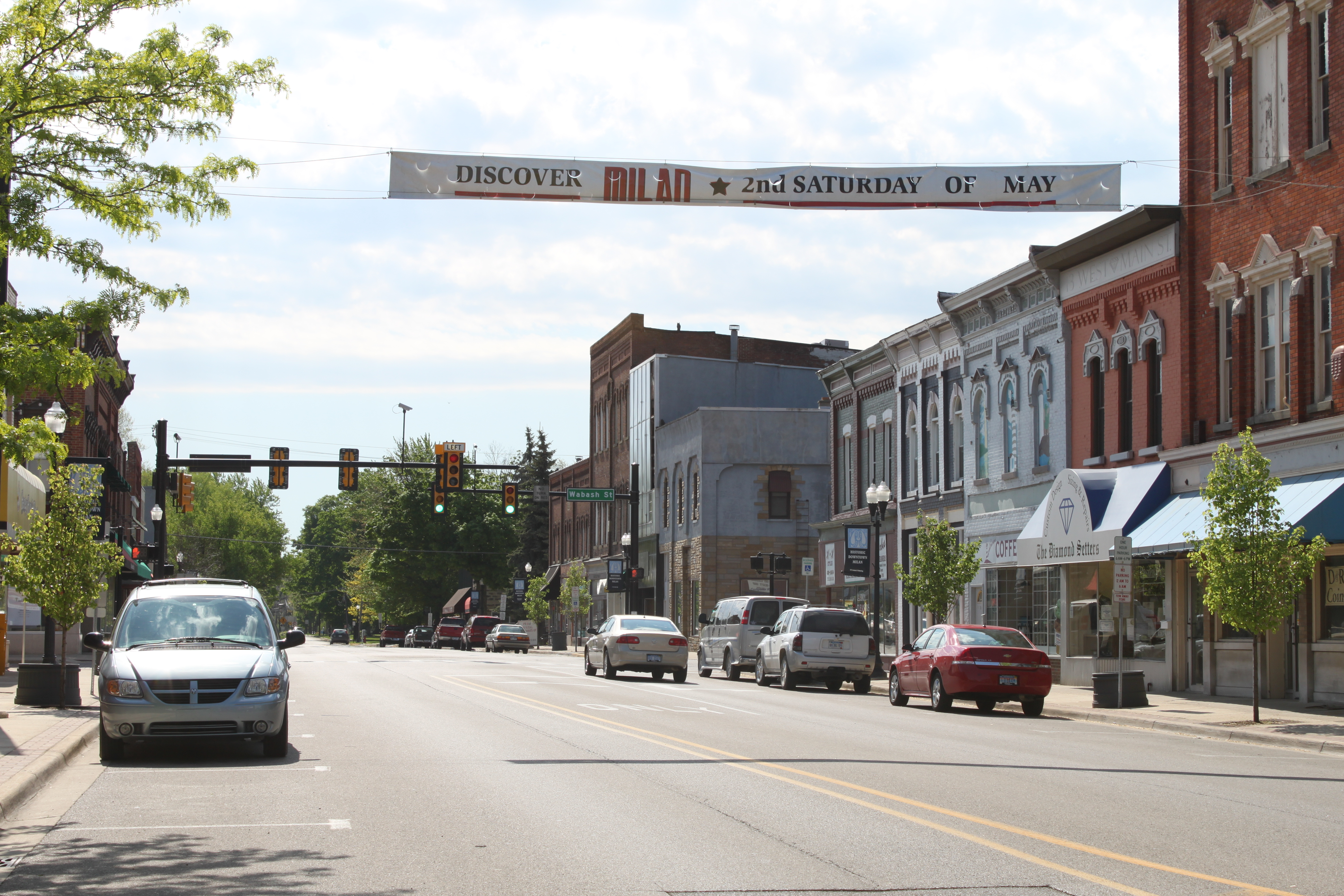
- West end of district, looking east

- Location within Michigan Location within the United States
- Interactive map
- Location: 3-153 E. Main, 1-41 W. Main, and 8 Park Lane, Milan, Michigan
- Coordinates: 42°5′5″N 83°41′1″W
- Area: 9 acres (3.6 ha)
- Built: 1878
- Architect: William R. Smith, Ralph S. Gerganoff
- Architectural style: Italianate, Queen Anne, Colonial Revival, Gothic Revival, Greek Revival, International Style, Moderne
- NRHP reference No.: 99000434
- Added to NRHP: April 14, 1999

The Main Street Historic District is a commercial historic district that includes structures located at 3-153 East Main Street, 1-41 West Main Street, and 8 Park Lane in Milan, Michigan. Although within Milan, the district spans the county line between Washtenaw County, Michigan and Monroe County, Michigan, containing structures within both counties. It was listed on the National Register of Historic Places in 1999.

== History ==
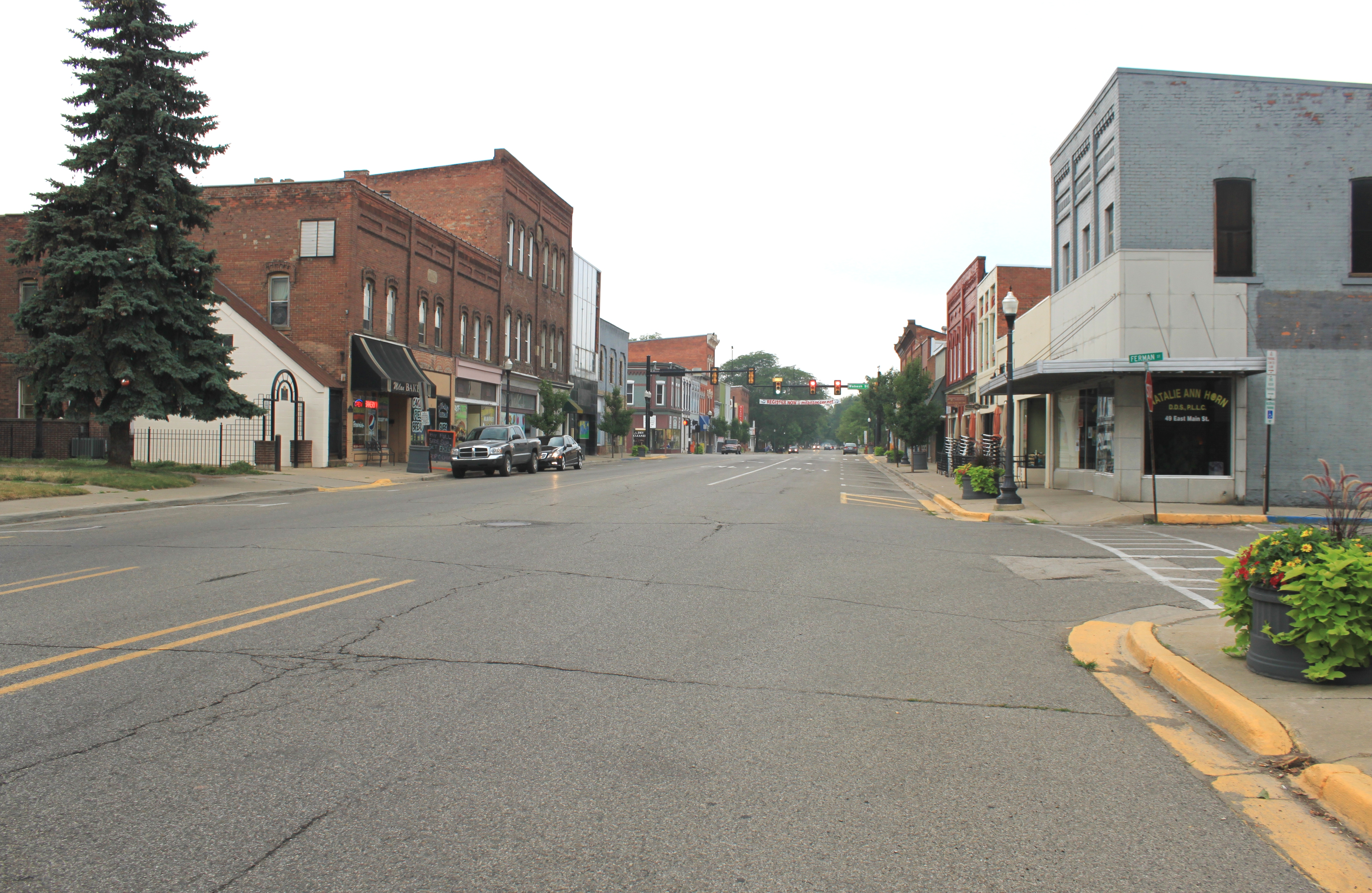
East end of district looking west

Milan was first settled in 1830, located at a point on the Saline River and on the Monroe-Saline plank road. A toll booth was placed on the plank road, collecting tolls that were used for road maintenance. As commerce flowed along the plank road, Milan quickly grew. A post office was established in 1833, a saw mill and flour mill (later incorporated into Henry Ford's village industries)) a few years later, and the first school opened in 1837. One of the first stores built in the downtown commercial district was the Ellis Building, constructed in 1845 by Elijah Ellis. Major fires in the commercial district destroyed buildings in 1891 and 1893.

== Structures ==
The structures in the Main Street Historic District are primarily commercial in nature. However, the district also includes structures originally built as a hotel, city hall/fire station, post office, church, hospital, meeting hall, and theatre. Significant structures include:

Stimpson Hotel/Danube Inn (24 W. Main): The Stimpson Hotel was built by Walter Stimpson in 1901. The hotel was destroyed by fire in 2011.

Ellis Building (12 E. Main): The Ellis Building was constructed by Elijah Ellis in 1845, and is the oldest building in the district.

(52 E. Main) This was built in 1906 by Dr. Emmet Pyle built for use as his home, medical office, and hospital.

Post Office (123 E. Main) The post office was dedicated in 1959.

Old Village Hall and Fire Station (153 East Main Street): The Old Village Hall And Fire Station was built in 1897, and was the first structure in the village built for municipal purposes. It is a two-story gross-gable brick building; it originally housed the fire department on the ground floor and village offices on the second. It is now the home of the Milan Area Historical Society.

Marble Memorial United Methodist Church (8 Park Lane): The cornerstone of the Marble Memorial United Methodist Church (originally the Methodist Episcopal Church) was laid in 1888. A large addition was added to the church in 1955, an education wing was added in 1964−65, and a major renovation was undertaken in 1982.
