= Huron High School (New Boston, Michigan) =

Public high school in Michigan, US

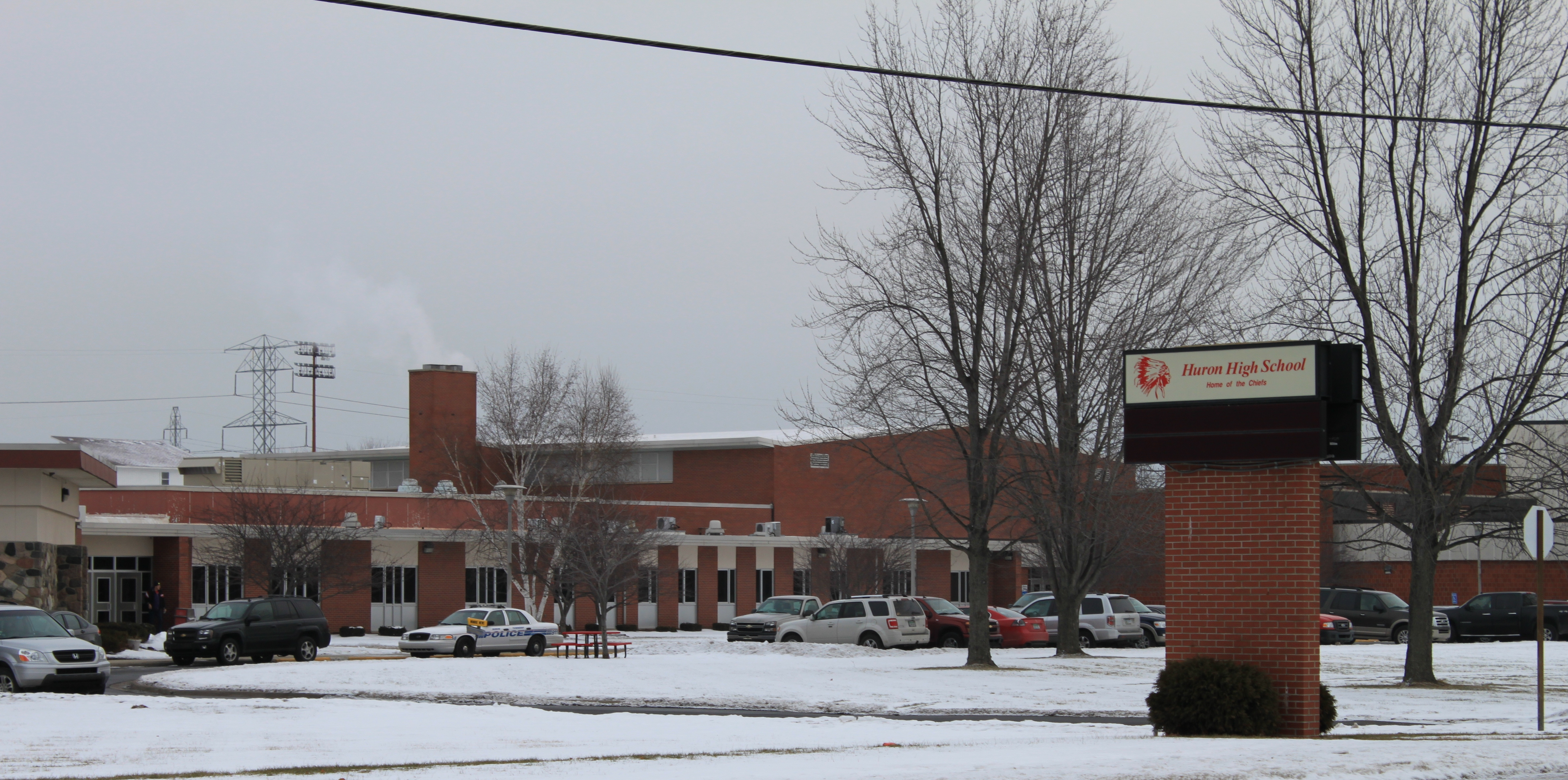

Location
- 32044 Huron River Drive; New Boston, Michigan 48164; United States
- Coordinates: 42°07′27″N 83°20′55″W

Information
- Type: Public secondary school
- School district: Huron School District
- Principal: Megan O'Brian
- Teaching staff: 41.20 (on an FTE basis)
- Grades: 9-12
- Enrollment: 793 (2023–2024)
- Student to teacher ratio: 19.25
- Colors: Red and white
- Athletics conference: Huron League
- Nickname: Chiefs
- Website: hhs.huronschools.com

Student assessments
- 2021–22 school year Change vs. prior year

M-STEP 11th grade proficiency rates (Science / Social Studies)
- Advanced %: 11.9 / 6.7
- Proficient %: 24.4 / 20.7
- PR. Proficient %: 17.6 / 53.4
- Not Proficient %: 46.1 / 19.2

Average test scores
- SAT Total: 793.1 (▼ −4.4)

Huron High School in New Boston, Michigan, is a public high school offering education for grades 9 to 12. It is part of the Huron School District.

== Demographics ==
The demographic breakdown of the 914 students enrolled for the 2014–15 school year was:

- Male – 50.2%
- Female – 49.8%
- Native American/Alaskan – .2%
- Asian/Pacific islanders – 0.9%
- Black – 3.2%
- Hispanic – 3.3%
- White – 89.5%
- Multiracial – 2.1%

25.3% of the students were eligible for free or reduced lunch.

== Athletics ==
The Chiefs compete in the Huron League. The school colors are red and white. The following MHSAA sanctioned sports are offered:

- Baseball (boys)
- Basketball (boys and girls)
- Bowling (boys and girls)
- Competitive cheer (girls)
- Cross country (boys and girls)
- Football (boys)
- Golf (boys and girls)
- Ice hockey (boys)
- Soccer (boys and girls)
- Softball (girls)
- Swim and dive (girls)
- Tennis (boys and girls)
- Track and field (boys and girls)
- Volleyball (girls)
- Wrestling (boys)
