= Milan High School (Michigan) =

Location
- 200 Big Red Dr; Milan, Michigan 48160; United States
- 42.0785°N 83.7025°W

Information
- Type: High School
- Established: August 2003
- School district: Milan Area Schools
- Teaching staff: 36.93 (FTE)
- Grades: 9-12
- Enrollment: 559 (2023–2024)
- Student to teacher ratio: 15.14
- Color
- Athletics: Class A, Huron League
- Mascot: Big Red
- Website: hs.milanareaschools.org

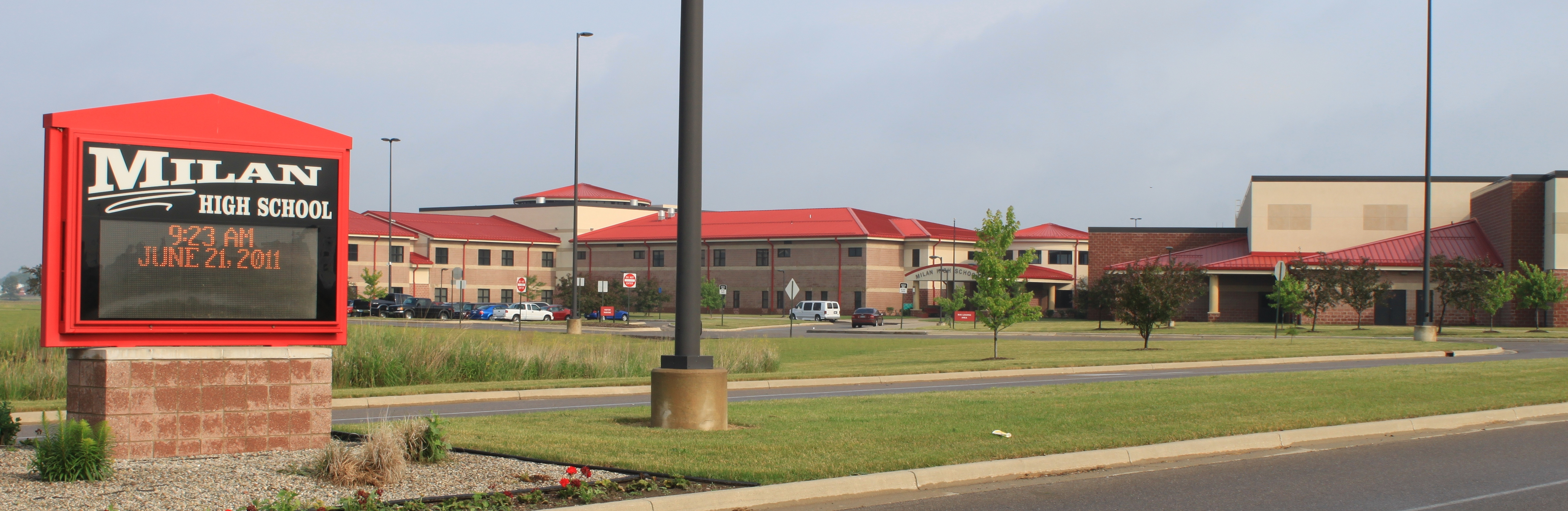
Milan High School

Milan High School is the sole high school in Milan, Michigan. It is part of the Milan Area Schools. Established in the 19th century, the school has had three principal locations since 1900. The first was a new building constructed that year at 100 Hurd Street, one block north of Milan's downtown center. It originally housed all grades. The School Board also purchased and consolidated a number of undeveloped lots bounded by North Street to the west, East Miller Street to the north, Marvin Street to the east, and East Michigan Avenue to the south. This complex, three blocks north of the main school building, was originally developed as a set of athletic fields.

In the 1930s, a new elementary school for Grades K through 6 was built at the corner of Marvin Street and East Michigan Avenue, while the original building from 1900 was doubled in size. The new west wing housed Milan Junior High School, serving grades 7 through 9; while the original, now east wing, continued to house Milan High School, serving grades 10 through 12. As the population of the school district grew by leaps and bounds during and after World War II, the new elementary school was gradually expanded during the 1940s and 1950s, from the original 8 classrooms to 36 classrooms.

Desirous of moving the high school away from the downtown area, and with the building built in 1900 becoming more and more expensive and difficult to maintain, a new high school was built at the corner of North and East Miller streets, opposite to the corner where the Varn D. Paddock Elementary School had been built. The new high school opened its doors in 1958, and was gradually expanded until it encompassed the entire north side of the lot from North Street to Marvin Street.

The west wing continued to house Milan Junior High School through June 1969. The east wing, already disused, was closed off after it was struck and seriously damaged by one of two F4 Tornados that were part of the 1965 Palm Sunday tornado outbreak. Construction subsequently began on the new Milan Middle School on Platt Road (renamed South Platt Street after Milan, a village until 1967, became a city). The new school opened in 1969 and the old Milan Junior High School was closed. This saw the transfer of Grade 9 to the new high school building on North Street, while Grade 6 was transferred from the Elementary School to the new Middle School.

The new Middle School was built on what had been a completely rural and undeveloped area on the Monroe County side of the school district. So when the new Middle School was built, a completely new set of athletic facilities - including fully equipped football and baseball stadiums - for use by the high school teams was included.

By the last decade of the 20th century, the need for a completely new and up-to-date high school facility was clear. It was built on land owned by the school district that was around the corner from the Middle School and on the other side of the athletic fields. When the new high school opened its doors in 2003, the middle school was transferred from its original location to the old high school facility at 920 North Street. The former middle school was then re-purposed as Symons Elementary School, serving grades 4 through 6; while the Paddock Elementary School continued to serve grades K through 3.

The Milan High School colors are red and black. The athletic teams are called the Big Reds, and compete in the Huron League.

== Notable alumni ==
- Nick Perkins (2015), basketball player who plays in Korea
