= Milan, Michigan =

City in Michigan, United States

- City
- City of Milan
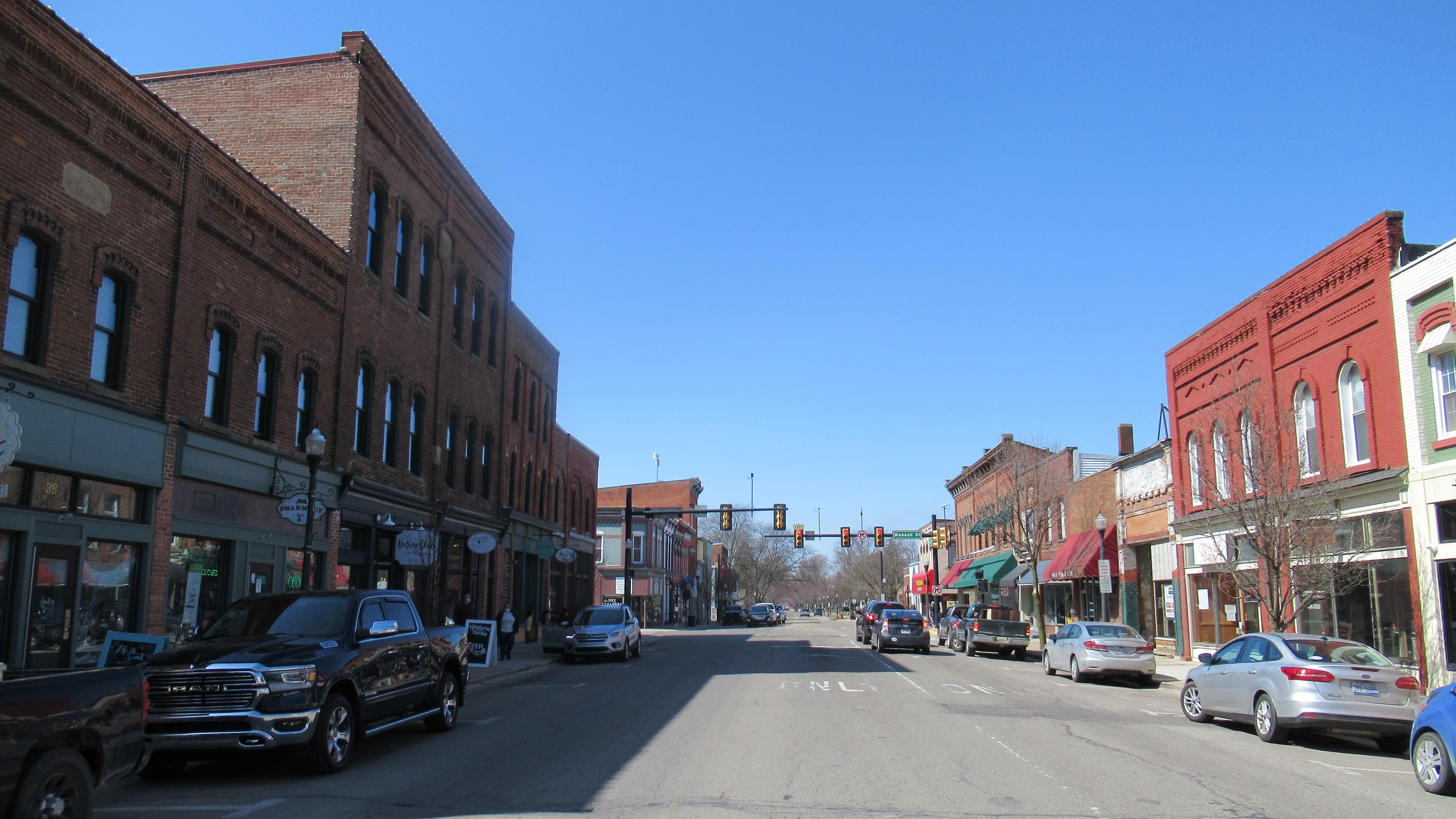
- Looking east along Main Street

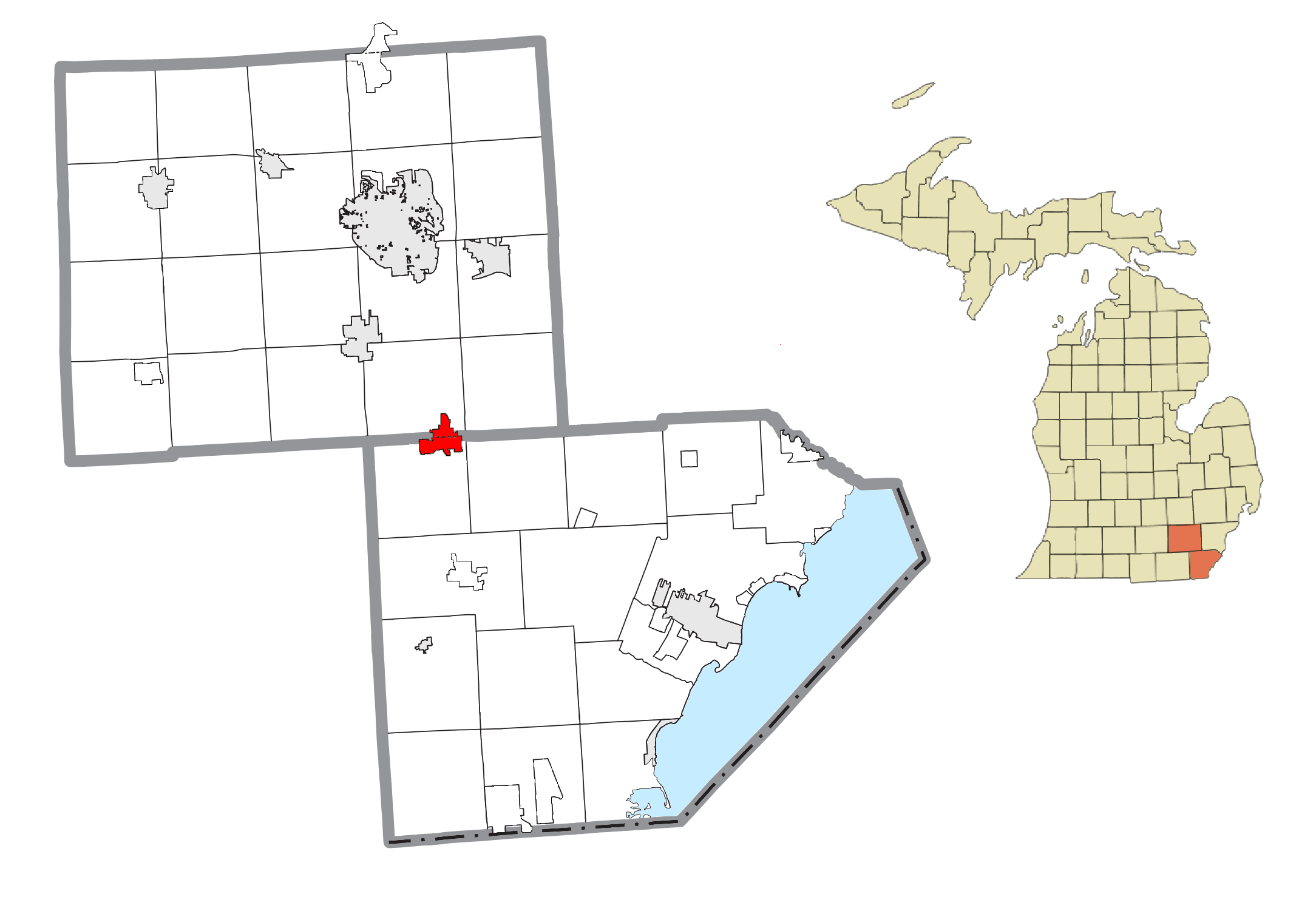
- Location within Monroe County (bottom) and Washtenaw County (top)

- Location within the state of Michigan Location within the United States
- Coordinates: 42°05′09″N 83°41′04″W
- Country: United States
- State: Michigan
- Counties: Monroe and Washtenaw
- Settled: 1831
- Incorporated: 1885 (village); 1967 (city)

Government
  - Type: Mayor–council
  - Mayor: Ed Kolar
  - Clerk: Lavonna Wenzel

Area
  - Total: 3.56 sq mi (9.2 km^{2})
  - Land: 3.48 sq mi (9.0 km^{2})
  - Water: 0.08 sq mi (0.21 km^{2})
- Elevation: 702 ft (214 m)

Population (2020)
  - Total: 6,079
  - Density: 1,746.84/sq mi (674.46/km^{2})
- Time zone: UTC-5 (Eastern (EST))
  - Summer (DST): UTC-4 (EDT)
- ZIP code(s): 48160
- Area code: 734
- FIPS code: 26-53920
- GNIS feature ID: 632302
- Website: Official website

Milan (/ˈmaɪlɪn/ MY-lin or /ˈmaɪlən/ MY-lən) is a city in Monroe and Washtenaw counties in the U.S. state of Michigan. The population was 6,079 at the 2020 census.

The community was settled as early as 1831. Milan incorporated as a village in 1885 and much later as a city in 1967. The center of the downtown area is listed on the National Register of Historic Places as the Main Street Historic District.

== History ==
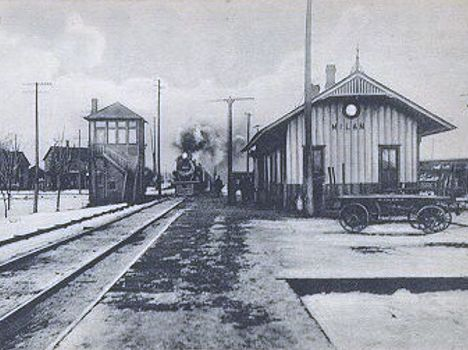
Historic image of the Milan Station

The first settler to the area was John Marvin, who arrived in the spring of 1831 and settled the community under the name "Tolanville", after his son-in-law Henry Tolan. Later, a part of downtown Milan would be named Tolan Square. He built his home and also operated a general store for travelers and other early residents. Other earlier settlers included Bethuel Hack and Harmon Allen, and their families became the area's first permanent residents. The population began to grow, and the first post office was established on March 27, 1833, under the name "Farmersville". The name was changed to Milan on April 21, 1836. The post office has remained in operation ever since and is presently located at 123 East Main Street. The community became part of York Township when it was organized in 1833 in Washtenaw County and Milan Township when it was organized in 1836 in the northwest corner of Monroe County. Other nearby communities included Azalia (East Milan), Cone (West Milan), and Mooreville.

Some of Milan's earliest structures that remain today include the Community House, which was built in 1834 as a gristmill. It was purchased by Henry Ford in 1935 and used for processing soybeans for automotive paint. It is currently used as a banquet hall. The Hack House Museum was built in 1888 and served as a private residence for many years, and it is now occupied by the Milan Area Historic Society. One of the most recognizable structures is the Old Milan Fire Barn, which was built in 1897 and served as a fire station until 1979. The fire department moved out of the building, and the building became abandoned until it was donated to the Milan Area Historical Society in 1983. The building was restored and rededicated in 2002.

In the 1870s, a railway line was built through the community. The line was operated by the Wabash Railroad and later became an intersection with the Ann Arbor Railroad. The railroad continues to pass through the area but no longer has a station in Milan.

== Geography ==
Milan is in northwestern Monroe County and southern Washtenaw County. While the city limits are close to equally divided across the two counties, the center of town and the majority of older development is within Washtenaw County. The city is 16 miles (26 km) south of Ann Arbor and 21 miles (34 km) northwest of Monroe, the Washtenaw and Monroe county seats, respectively. According to the U.S. Census Bureau, Milan has a total area of 3.56 square miles (9.22 km^{2}), of which 3.48 square miles (9.01 km^{2}) are land and 0.08 square miles (0.21 km^{2}), or 2.30%, are water.

The Saline River passes through the center of Milan. The river is a southeast-flowing tributary of the River Raisin, part of the Lake Erie watershed.

The city of Milan uses the 48160 ZIP Code, which also serves a larger area including London Township and Milan Township in Monroe County and Augusta Charter Township and York Charter Township in Washtenaw County.

=== Major highways ===
- US 23, a four-lane freeway, runs south–north along the eastern edge of the city.

== Demographics ==
Historical population
Census	Pop.	Note	%±
1880	320		—
1890	917		186.6%
1900	1,141		24.4%
1910	1,355		18.8%
1920	1,557		14.9%
1930	1,947		25.0%
1940	2,340		20.2%
1950	2,768		18.3%
1960	3,616		30.6%
1970	3,997		10.5%
1980	4,182		4.6%
1990	4,040		−3.4%
2000	4,775		18.2%
2010	5,836		22.2%
2020	6,079		4.2%
U.S. Decennial Census

=== 2020 census ===
As of the 2020 census, Milan had a population of 6,079. The median age was 37.6 years. 24.2% of residents were under the age of 18 and 13.9% of residents were 65 years of age or older. For every 100 females there were 92.4 males, and for every 100 females age 18 and over there were 89.2 males age 18 and over.

100.0% of residents lived in urban areas, while 0.0% lived in rural areas.

There were 2,466 households in Milan, of which 33.1% had children under the age of 18 living in them. Of all households, 46.7% were married-couple households, 17.0% were households with a male householder and no spouse or partner present, and 29.1% were households with a female householder and no spouse or partner present. About 29.7% of all households were made up of individuals and 12.0% had someone living alone who was 65 years of age or older.

There were 2,579 housing units, of which 4.4% were vacant. The homeowner vacancy rate was 1.5% and the rental vacancy rate was 6.4%.

Racial composition as of the 2020 census
Race	Number	Percent
White	5,332	87.7%
Black or African American	159	2.6%
American Indian and Alaska Native	24	0.4%
Asian	46	0.8%
Native Hawaiian and Other Pacific Islander	0	0.0%
Some other race	70	1.2%
Two or more races	448	7.4%
Hispanic or Latino (of any race)	278	4.6%

=== 2010 census ===
As of the census of 2010, there were 5,836 people, 2,308 households, and 1,532 families residing in the city. The population density was 1,757.8 inhabitants per square mile (678.7/km^{2}). There were 2,487 housing units at an average density of 749.1 per square mile (289.2/km^{2}). The racial makeup of the city was 92.3% White, 2.8% African American, 0.5% Native American, 0.9% Asian, 1.0% from other races, and 2.6% from two or more races. Hispanic or Latino of any race were 4.6% of the population.

There were 2,308 households, of which 38.5% had children under the age of 18 living with them, 47.3% were married couples living together, 14.4% had a female householder with no husband present, 4.7% had a male householder with no wife present, and 33.6% were non-families. 27.8% of all households were made up of individuals, and 8.9% had someone living alone who was 65 years of age or older. The average household size was 2.52 and the average family size was 3.10.

The median age in the city was 34.4 years. 28% of residents were under the age of 18; 8.5% were between the ages of 18 and 24; 31% were from 25 to 44; 22.9% were from 45 to 64; and 9.7% were 65 years of age or older. The gender makeup of the city was 48.2% male and 51.8% female.

=== 2000 census ===
As of the census of 2000, there were 4,775 people, 1,923 households, and 1,271 families residing in the city. The population density was 2,127.4 inhabitants per square mile (821.4/km^{2}). There were 1,999 housing units at an average density of 890.6 per square mile (343.9/km^{2}). The racial makeup of the city was 94.30% White, 1.74% African American, 0.36% Native American, 0.69% Asian, 0.02% Pacific Islander, 1.72% from other races, and 1.17% from two or more races. Hispanic or Latino of any race were 3.50% of the population.

There were 1,923 households, out of which 36.7% had children under the age of 18 living with them, 49.1% were married couples living together, 13.5% had a female householder with no husband present, and 33.9% were non-families. 28.0% of all households were made up of individuals, and 10.1% had someone living alone who was 65 years of age or older. The average household size was 2.48 and the average family size was 3.04.

In the city, the population was spread out, with 27.6% under the age of 18, 8.7% from 18 to 24, 34.2% from 25 to 44, 19.1% from 45 to 64, and 10.5% who were 65 years of age or older. The median age was 33 years. For every 100 females, there were 92.3 males. For every 100 females age 18 and over, there were 87.9 males.

The median income for a household in the city was $61,250. The per capita income for the city was $23,909. About 8.6% of the population were below the poverty line.

== Education ==
The city of Milan is served by Milan Area Schools, which also serves portions of several adjacent townships in both Monroe County and Washtenaw County. All of the schools within the district are located within the city limits of Milan, including Milan High School.

== Notable people ==
- Denise Nicholas, film and television actress who starred in the TV series Room 222, was born in Detroit and raised in Milan.
- Stan Joplin, former player and head men's basketball coach at the University of Toledo.
- Shannon Wayne, mayor of Milan.

== Images ==
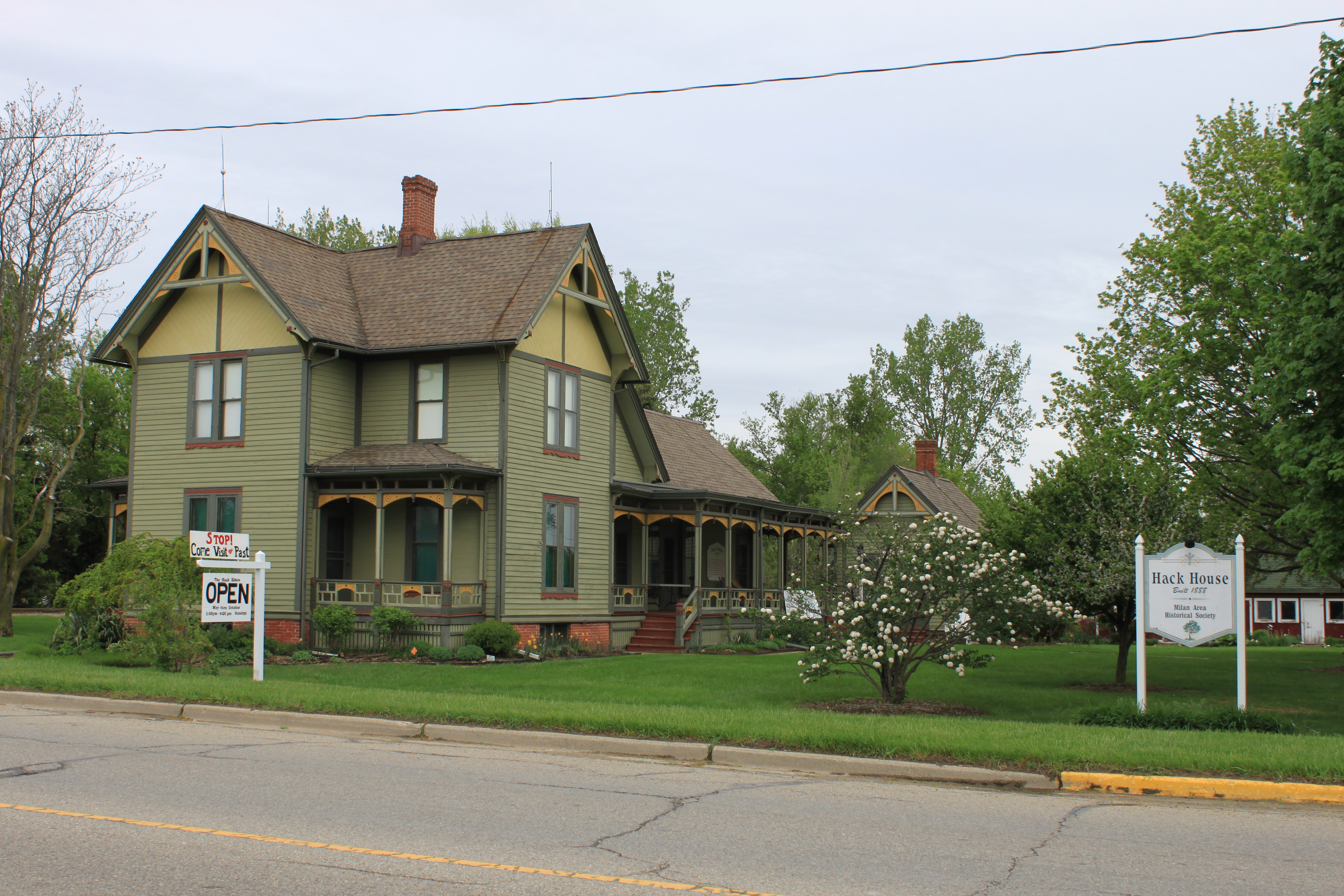
The Hack House, built in 1888

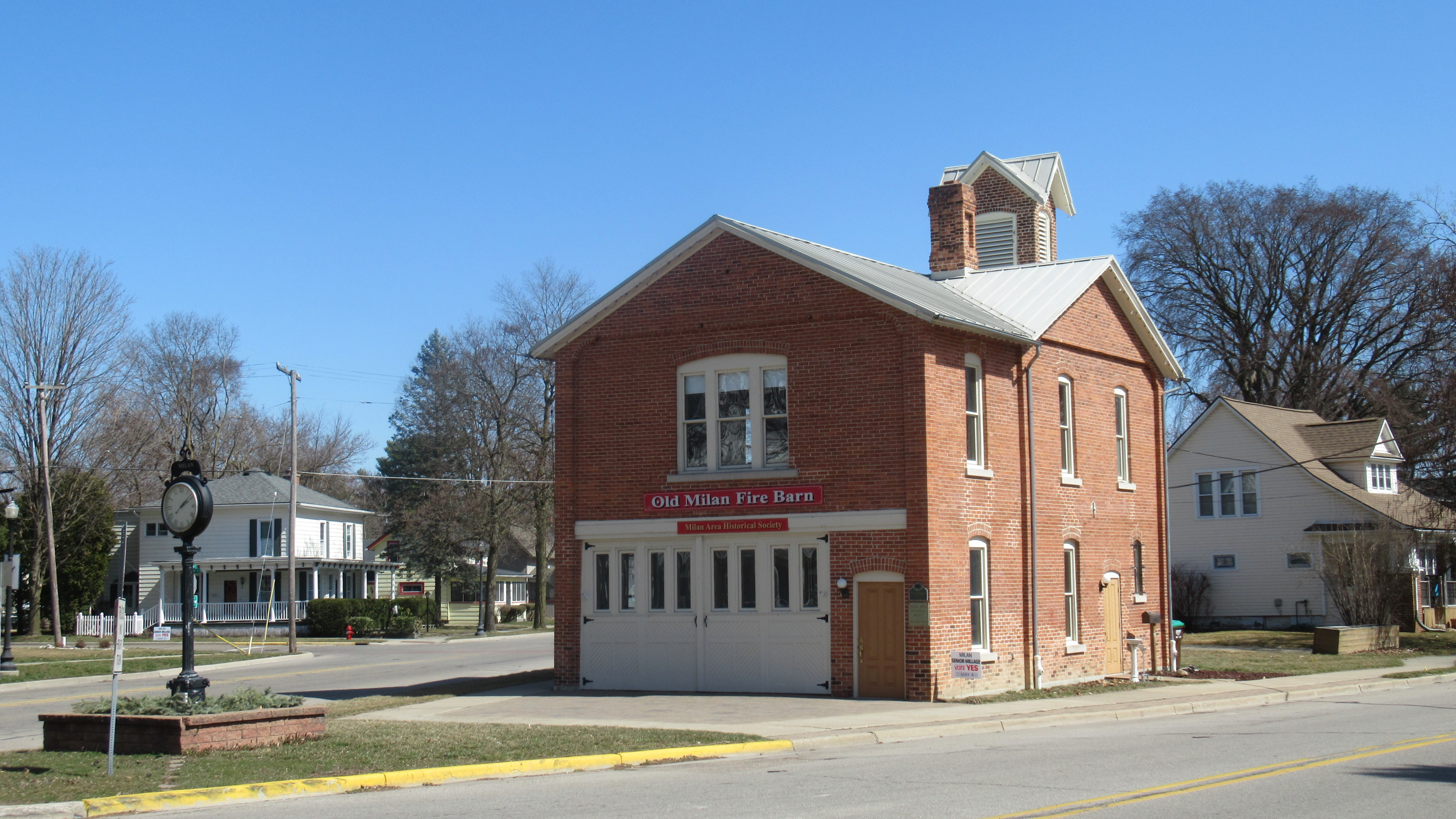
The Old Milan Fire Barn, built in 1897

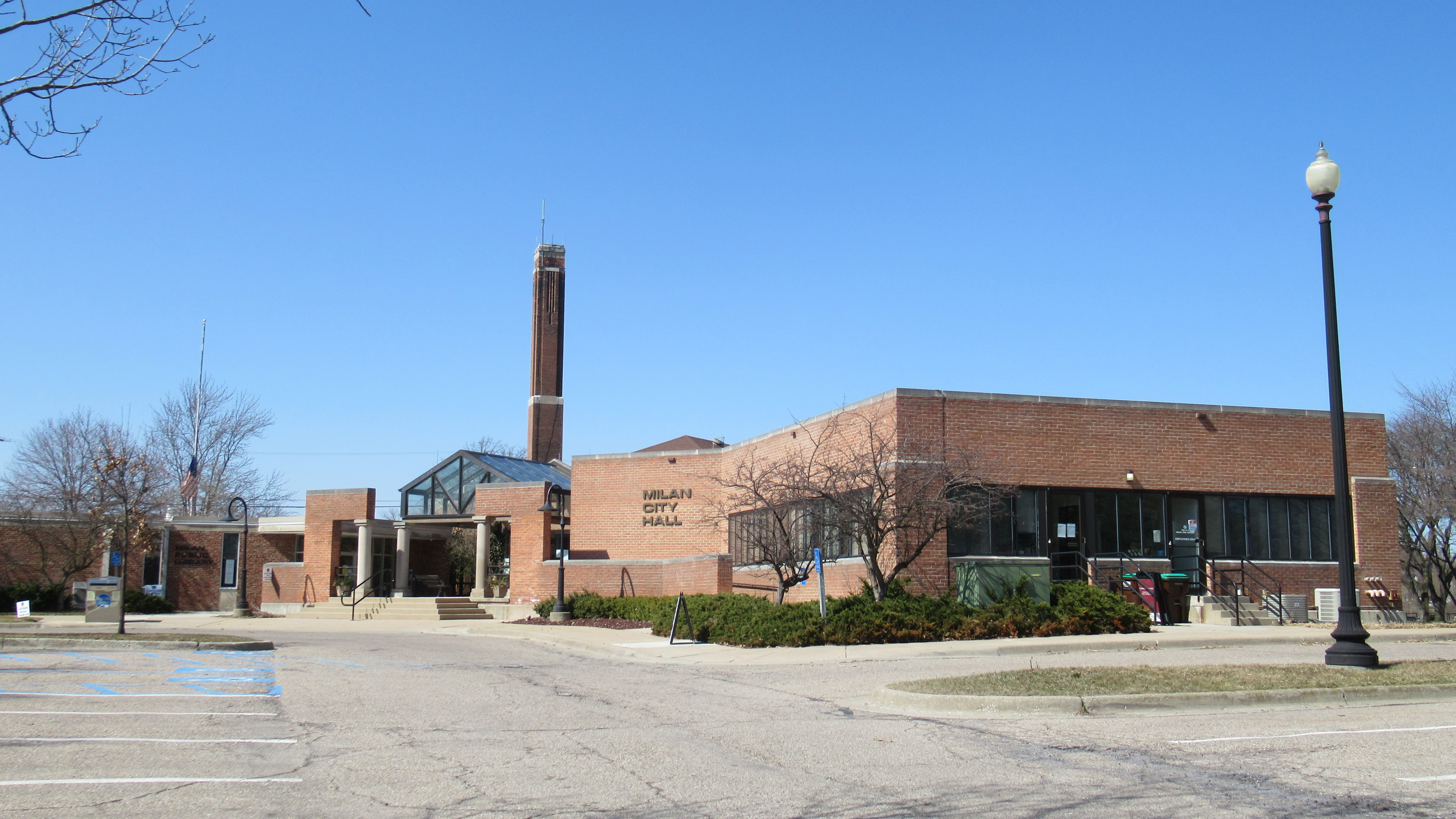
Milan City Hall

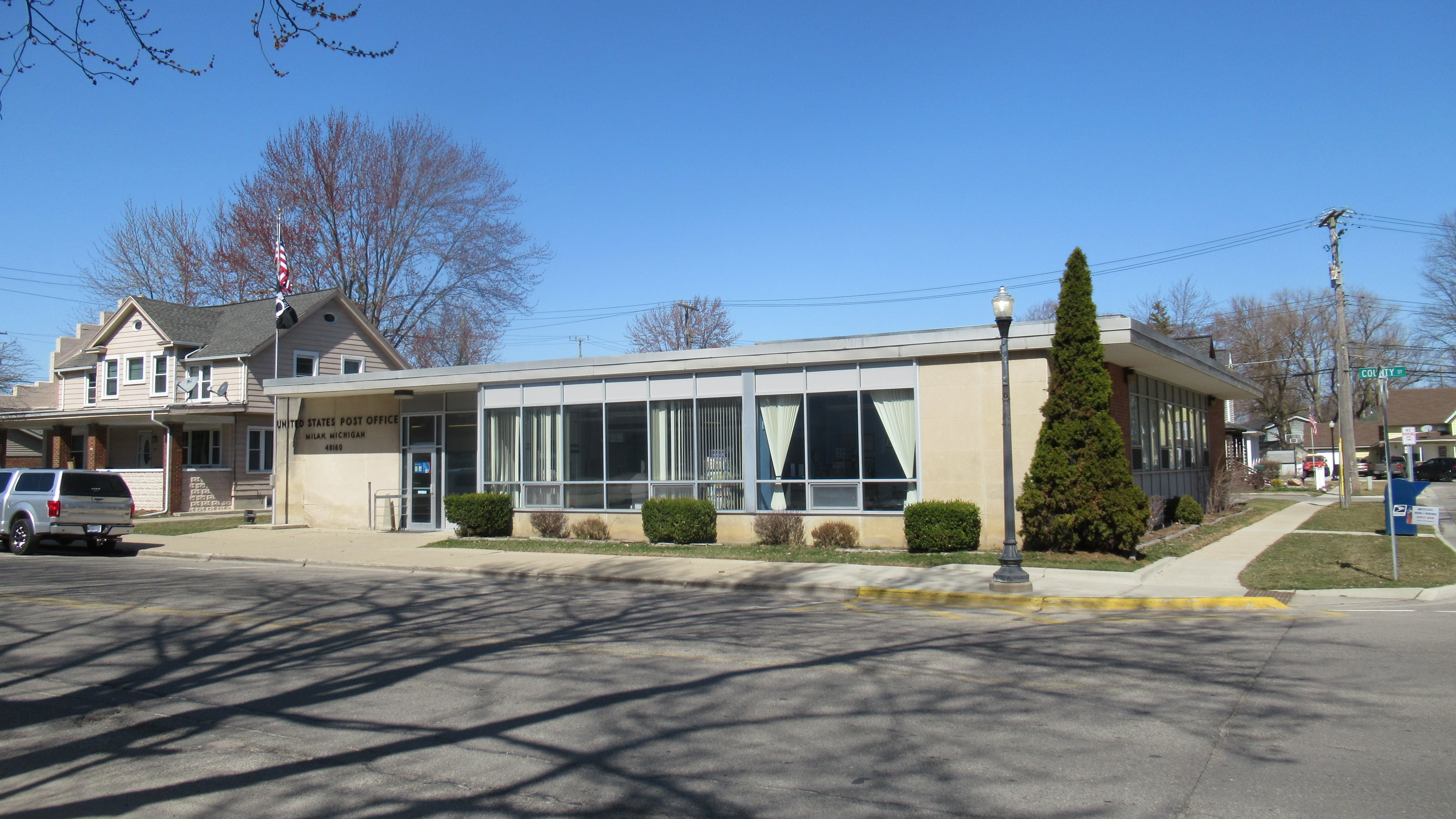
U.S. Post Office in Milan
