= Grosse Ile High School =

Public school in Michigan, United States

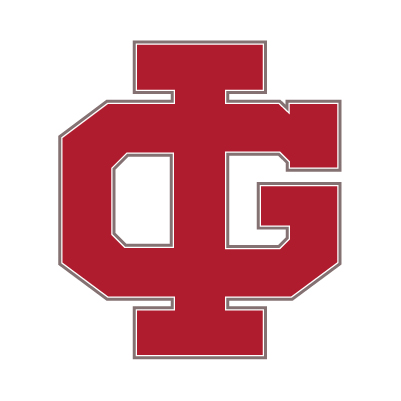

Location
- 7800 Grays Drive; Grosse Ile Township, Michigan 48138; United States

Information
- Other name: GIHS
- Type: Public high school
- School district: Grosse Ile Township Schools
- NCES School ID: 261722005401
- Principal: Alan Carter
- Teaching staff: 31.59 (on an FTE basis)
- Grades: 9–12
- Enrollment: 523 (2023-2024)
- Student to teacher ratio: 16.56
- Colors: Scarlet and gray
- Athletics conference: Huron League
- Nickname: Red Devils
- Yearbook: The Islander
- Website: www.gischools.org/o/highschool

Student assessments
- 2021–22 school year Change vs. prior year

M-STEP 11th grade proficiency rates (Science / Social Studies)
- Advanced %: 22.0 / 16.5
- Proficient %: 35.4 / 41.7
- PR. Proficient %: 17.3 / –
- Not Proficient %: 25.2 / ≤5

Average test scores
- SAT Total: 1080.8 (▲ +8.9)

Grosse Ile High School (GIHS) is a public high school in Grosse Ile Township, Michigan, United States. It is part of the Grosse Ile Township Schools district.

== Demographics ==
The demographic breakdown of the 562 students enrolled for the 2021–22 school year was:

- Male - 49.5%
- Female - 50.5%
- Native American/Alaskan - 0.7%
- Asian - 4.4%
- Black - 0.9%
- Hispanic - 5.3%
- White - 86.2%
- Multiracial - 2.5%

9.6% of the students were eligible for free or reduced-cost lunch for the 2021–22 school year. Grosse Ile is a Title I school.

== Athletics ==
The Grosse Ile Red Devils compete in the Huron League. The school colors are scarlet and gray. The following Michigan High School Athletic Association (MHSAA) sanctioned sports are offered.

- Baseball (boys)
- Basketball (girls and boys)
- Competitive cheerleading (girls)
  - State champion - 2002, 2010
- Cross country (girls and boys)
- Football (boys)
- Golf (girls and boys)
  - Boys state champion - 1998, 1999, 2000, 2002, 2003
  - Girls state champion - 1996, 1997, 1998, 2000, 2002, 2003, 2009, 2011, 2013
- Ice hockey (boys)
- Lacrosse (boys)
- Soccer (girls and boys)
  - Boys state champion - 2002, 2019
- Softball (girls)
  - State champion - 1977
- Swim and dive (girls)
- Tennis (girls and boys)
  - Boys state champion - 2005, 2007 (spring)
  - Girls state champion - 2014
- Track and field (girls and boys)
  - Boys state champion 1959
- Volleyball (girls)
- Wrestling (boys)

== Notable alumni ==
- Max Gail, actor
- William S. Knudsen, automotive industry executive
- Rylee Linting, state representative
