= Milan Township, Michigan =

- Civil township
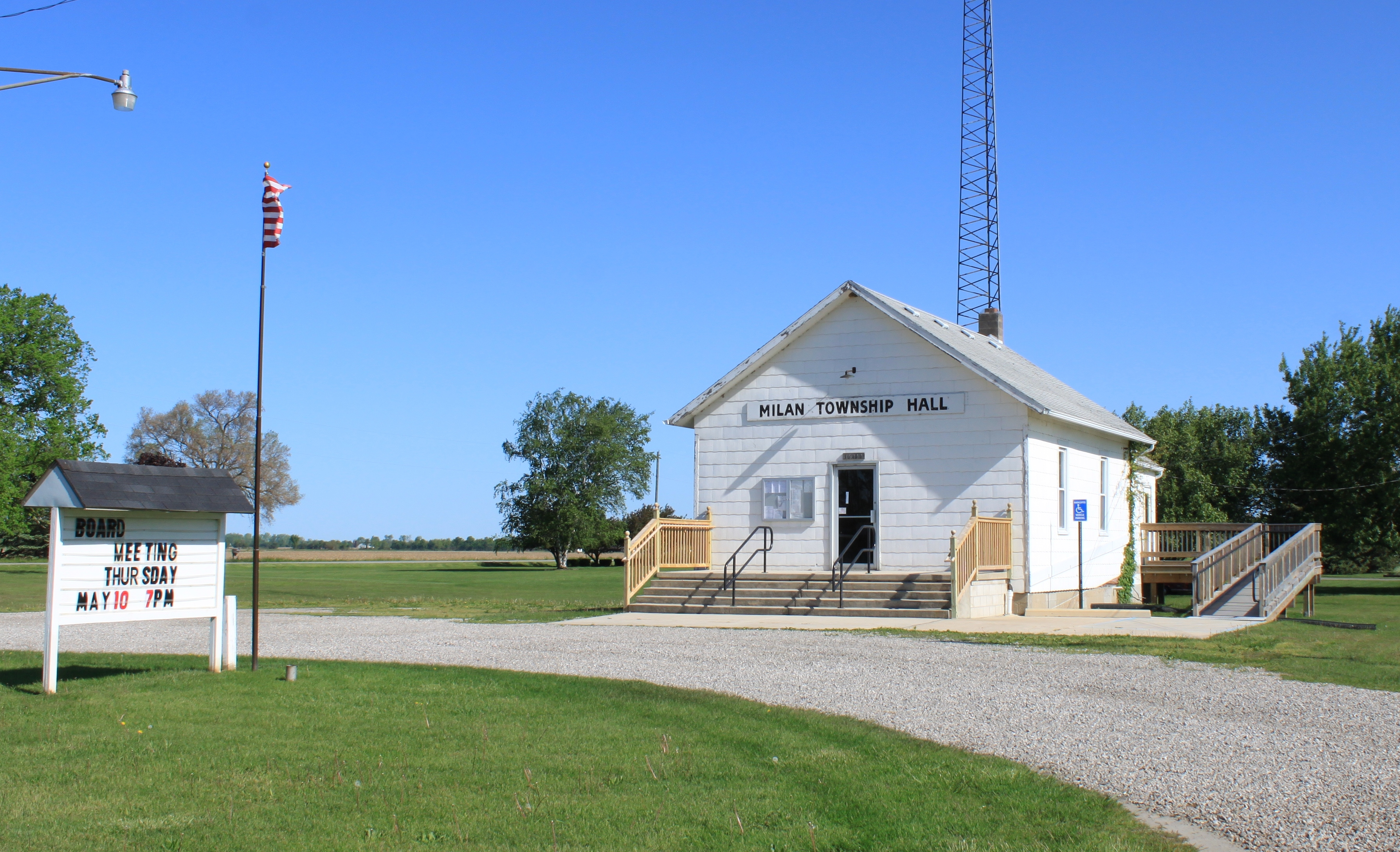
- Milan Township Hall on Cone Road

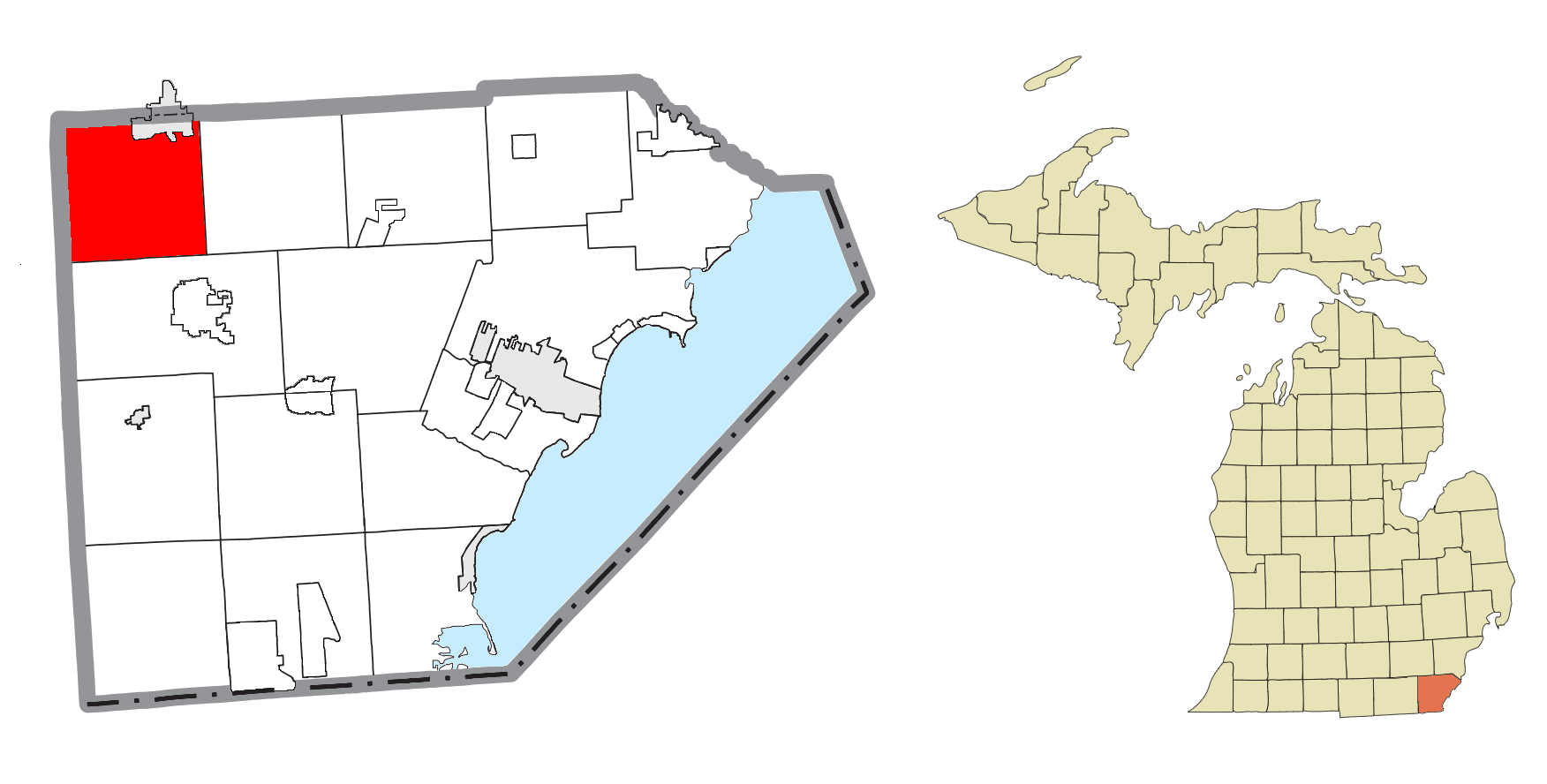
- Location within Monroe County and the state of Michigan

- Location within Michigan Location within the United States
- Coordinates: 42°02′12″N 83°42′26″W
- Country: United States
- State: Michigan
- County: Monroe
- Organized: 1836

Government
  - Supervisor: Mark Bogi
  - Clerk: Stephanie Kozar

Area
  - Total: 34.02 sq mi (88.1 km^{2})
  - Land: 34.00 sq mi (88.1 km^{2})
  - Water: 0.02 sq mi (0.052 km^{2})
- Elevation: 679 ft (207 m)

Population (2020)
  - Total: 1,571
  - Density: 46.2/sq mi (17.8/km^{2})
- Time zone: UTC-5 (Eastern (EST))
  - Summer (DST): UTC-4 (EDT)
- ZIP Codes: 48160 (Milan); 48110 (Azalia); 48131 (Dundee); 49229 (Britton); 48159 (Maybee)
- Area code: 734
- FIPS code: 26-115-53900
- GNIS feature ID: 1626739
- Website: www.milantownship.org

Milan Township is a civil township of Monroe County in the U.S. state of Michigan. The population was 1,571 at the 2020 census. The township was organized in 1836. The city of Milan borders the township on the north, but the two are administrated autonomously since Milan incorporated as a city in 1967.

== Communities ==
- Azalia is an unincorporated community located in the eastern portion of the township at 42°01′08″N 83°39′57″W. Originally known as "East Milan", a post office was established in the community on August 4, 1869.
- Cone is an unincorporated community within the township in the western portion of the township at 42°01′55″N 83°45′11″W. The community, originally known as "West Milan", was established in the 1830s and had its own post office from August 4, 1869, until September 15, 1917.

== Geography ==
Milan Township is in the northwest corner of Monroe County, bordered by Lenawee County to the west and partially by Washtenaw County to the north. The city of Milan also borders the township to the north.

According to the U.S. Census Bureau, the township has a total area of 34.0 square miles (88.06 km^{2}), of which 0.02 square miles (0.05 km^{2}), or 0.05%, are water.

== Demographics ==
Historical population
Census	Pop.	Note	%±
1850	642		—
1860	1,045		62.8%
1870	1,420		35.9%
1880	1,882		32.5%
1890	2,079		10.5%
1900	2,111		1.5%
1910	1,943		−8.0%
1920	1,672		−13.9%
1930	2,048		22.5%
1940	2,092		2.1%
1950	2,261		8.1%
1960	2,490		10.1%
1970	1,890		−24.1%
1980	2,021		6.9%
1990	1,659		−17.9%
2000	1,670		0.7%
2010	1,601		−4.1%
2020	1,571		−1.9%
U.S. Decennial Census

As of the census of 2000, there were 1,670 people, 610 households, and 489 families residing in the township. The population density was 47.6 inhabitants per square mile (18.4/km^{2}). There were 632 housing units at an average density of 18.0 per square mile (6.9/km^{2}). The racial makeup of the township was 98.20% White, 0.36% African American, 0.36% Native American, 0.06% Asian, 0.36% from other races, and 0.66% from two or more races. Hispanic or Latino of any race were 1.74% of the population.

There were 610 households, out of which 32.3% had children under the age of 18 living with them, 70.5% were married couples living together, 6.7% had a female householder with no husband present, and 19.7% were non-families. 16.4% of all households were made up of individuals, and 6.2% had someone living alone who was 65 years of age or older. The average household size was 2.74 and the average family size was 3.08.

In the township the population was spread out, with 25.0% under the age of 18, 5.9% from 18 to 24, 32.0% from 25 to 44, 25.6% from 45 to 64, and 11.6% who were 65 years of age or older. The median age was 38 years. For every 100 females, there were 110.1 males. For every 100 females age 18 and over, there were 103.7 males.

The median income for a household in the township was $57,361, and the median income for a family was $66,875. Males had a median income of $43,696 versus $33,667 for females. The per capita income for the township was $23,269. About 2.2% of families and 4.5% of the population were below the poverty line, including 5.3% of those under age 18 and 3.9% of those age 65 or over.

== Highways ==
- US 23 crosses the eastern part of the township from north to south.
