= Mooreville, New South Wales =

Industrial estate in Griffith, New South Wales, Australia

Mooreville is an industrial suburb located in Griffith, New South Wales. The area is home to a variety of businesses such as those specialising in irrigation technology, mechanical, manufacturing and furniture sectors, as well as a brothel.
