= Saline River (Michigan) =

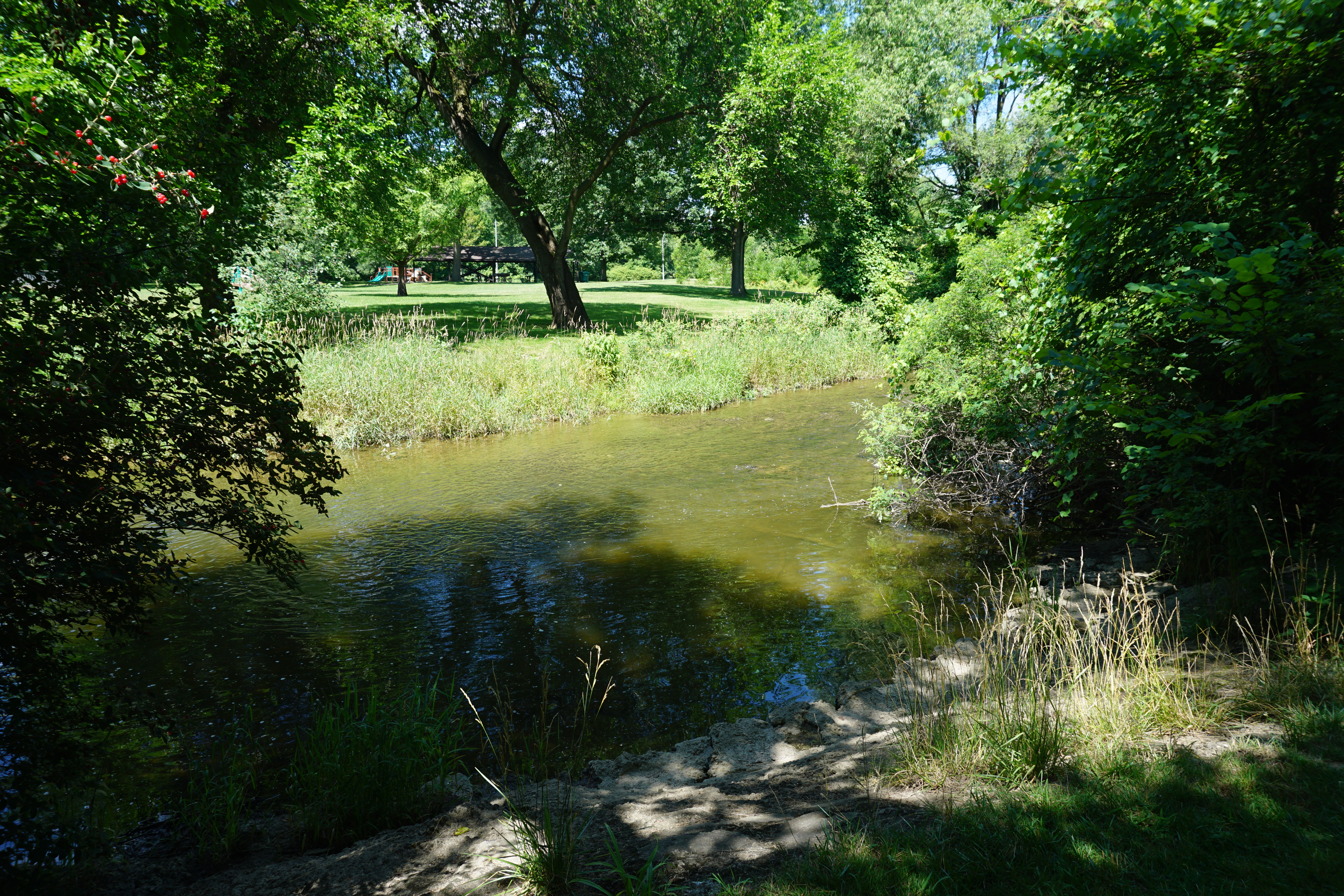
- Saline River in Saline, Michigan

- Location within the state of Michigan

Location
- Country: United States

Physical characteristics
- Source
  - location: Washtenaw County
  - coordinates: 42.1575°N 83.9396°W
- Mouth
  - location: River Raisin, Michigan
  - coordinates: 41.9753°N 83.6127°W
- Length: 45.6 mi (73.4 km)

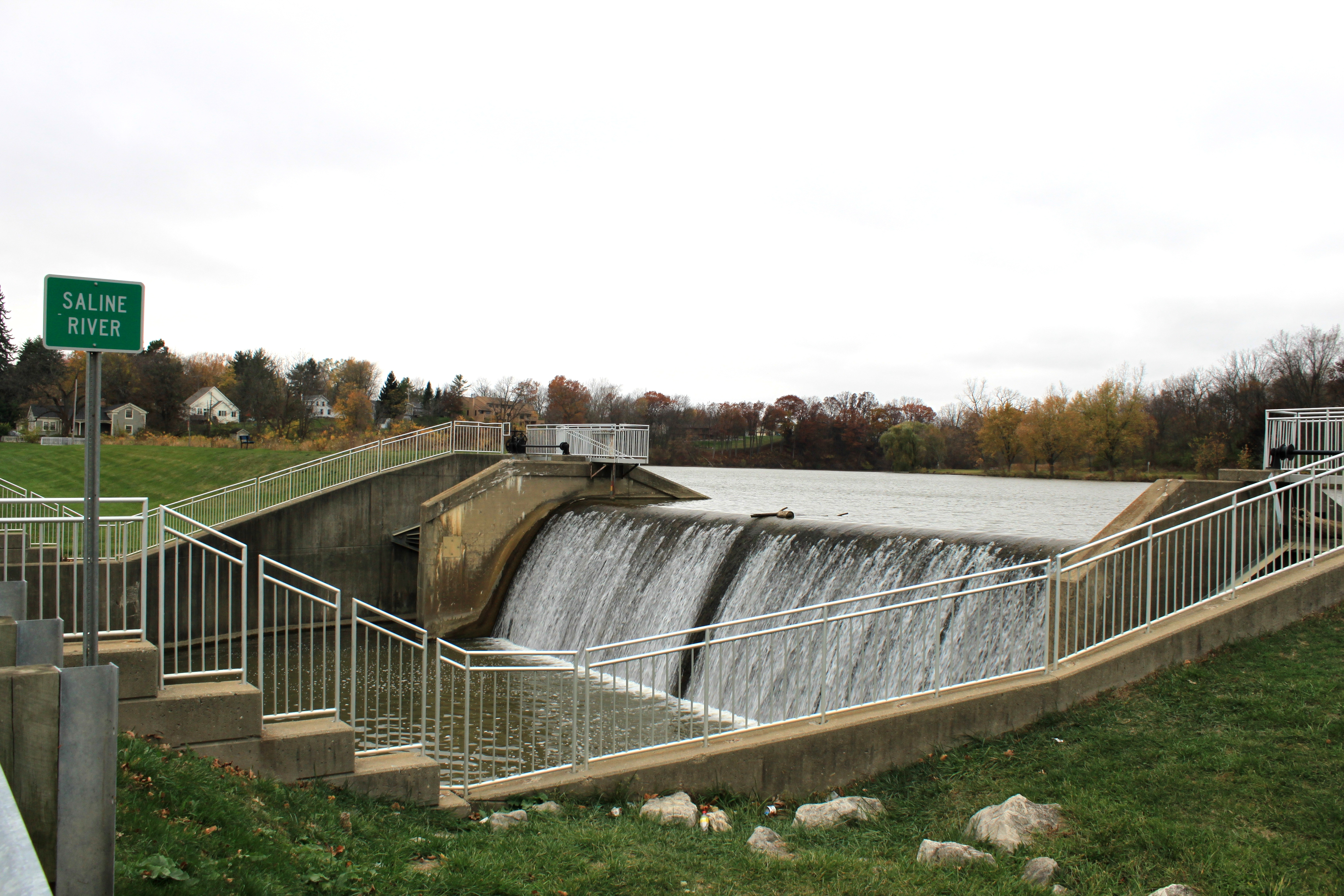
Saline River Dam, Saline

The Saline River is a 45.6-mile-long (73.4 km) river in southeastern Michigan in the United States. A tributary of the River Raisin, it originates in Washtenaw County; flows through the cities of Saline and Milan, where it enters Monroe County; then joins the River Raisin at the village of Dundee. Although named after the city of Saline, which was once famous for its salt springs, the Saline River is not at all salty.

== See also ==
- List of rivers of Michigan
