= Milan Area Schools =

School district in Michigan

Address
- 100 Big Red Drive Milan, Monroe, Michigan, 48160; United States

District information
- Grades: Pre-Kindergarten-12
- Superintendent: Ryan McMahon
- Schools: 6
- Budget: $36,294,000 2022-2023 expenditures
- NCES District ID: 2623850

Students and staff
- Students: 1,839 (2024-2025)
- Teachers: 125.1 (on an FTE basis) (2024-2025)
- Staff: 352.5 FTE (2024-2025)
- Student–teacher ratio: 14.7 (2024-2025)

Other information
- Website: www.milanareaschools.org

Milan Area Schools is a public school district in Monroe County and Washtenaw County, Michigan. It serves Milan and parts of the townships of Augusta, Exeter, London, Pittsfield, Milan, Saline, York, and Ypsilanti.

== History ==
Although the first school in Milan was built in the 1830s, the first brick multi-classroom school opened in 1882 at Hurd Street and Ferman Avenue. It was rebuilt in 1900 after a fire, and an addition to it was built in 1927. The district was officially established in 1954 as rural districts in the area consolidated with the Milan city district.

Milan Middle School, designed by Eberle Smith and Associates, was built as Milan High School in 1958. The 1900 school became a middle school until it was replaced in 1969 and sold. The current Milan High School opened in 2003, and the 1969 middle school building then became Symons Elementary.

Milan High School features a 2,200-seat gym and an 850-seat auditorium. The architect was Fanning Howey.

== Schools ==
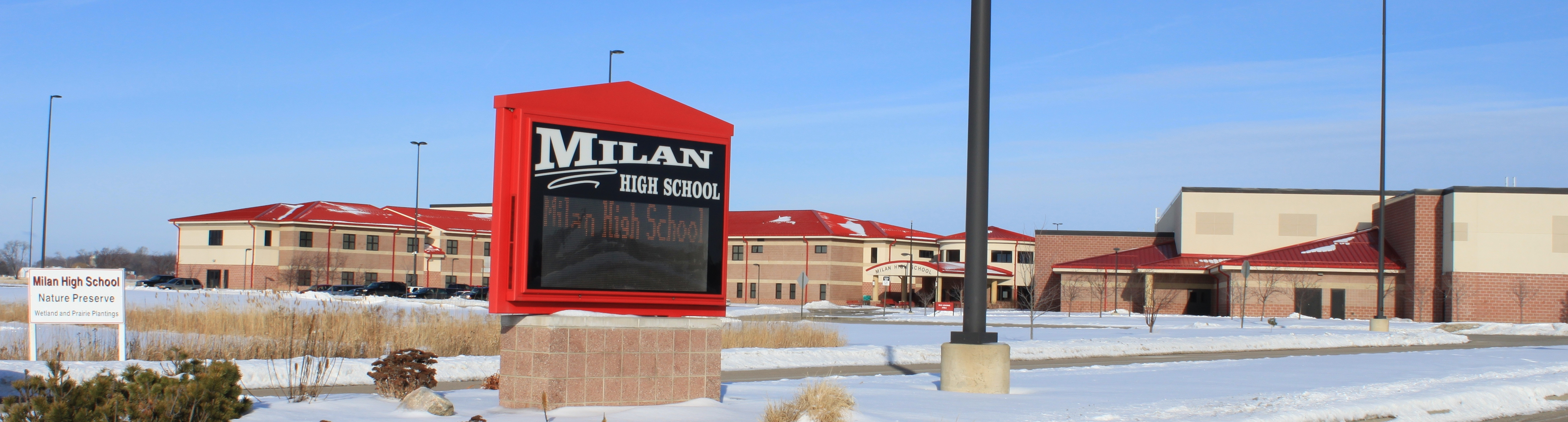
Milan High School

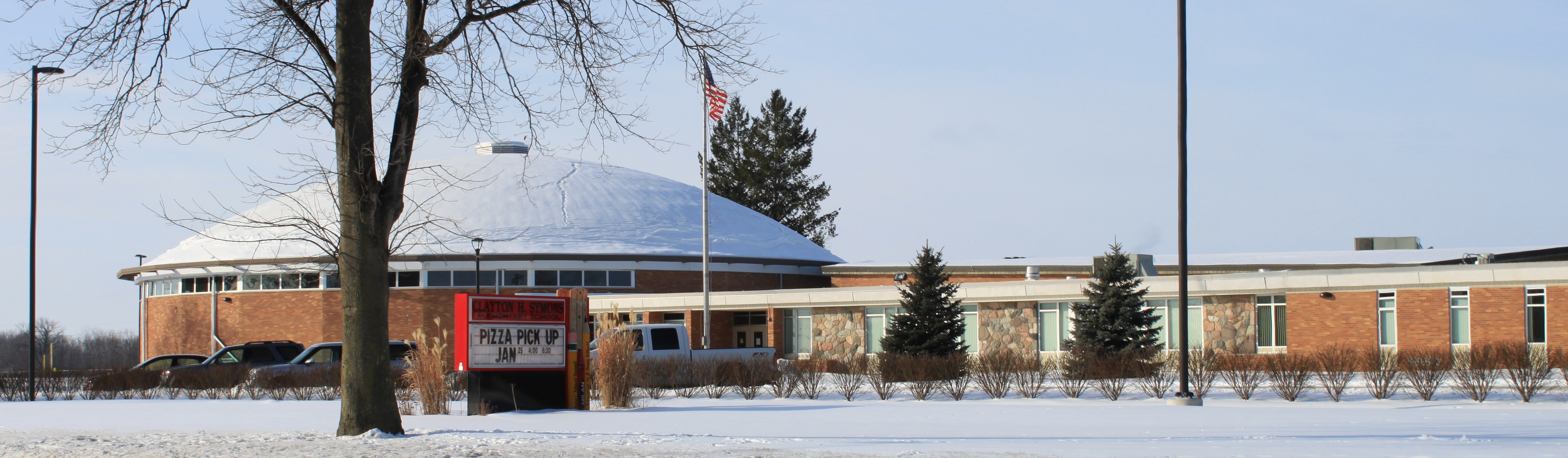
Symons Elementary School

Schools in Milan Area Schools
School	Address	Notes
Milan High School	200 Big Red Drive, Milan	Grades 9-12. Built 2003.
Milan Middle School	920 North Street, Milan	Grades 5-8. Built 1958.
Paddock Elementary School	707 Marvin Street, Milan	Grades PreK-1. Built 1957.
Symons Elementary School	432 S. Platt Road, Milan	Grades 2-4. Built 1969.
Milan Alternative Education	920 North Street, Milan	Alternative high school located at Milan Middle School.
