= Federal Correctional Institution, Greenville =

Medium-security prison in Illinois, US

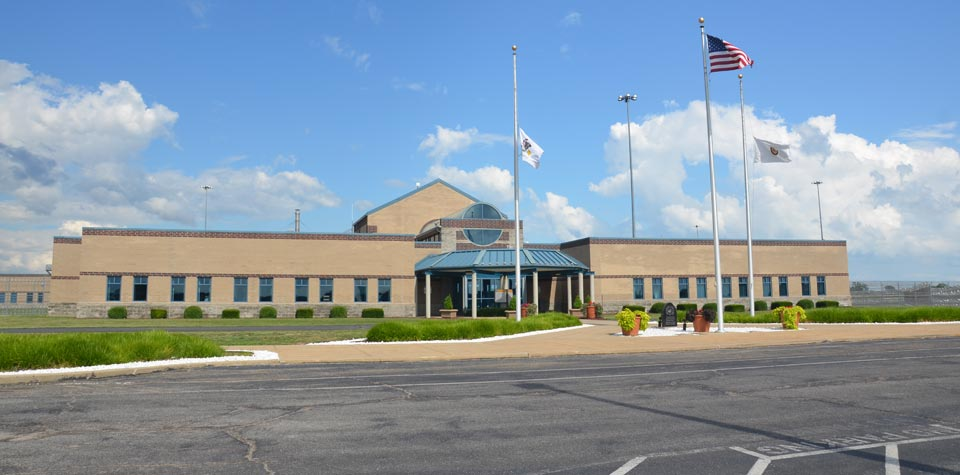
- Interactive map of Federal Correctional Institution, Greenville
- Location: Greenville, Illinois; 38°51′58″N 89°24′32″W
- Status: Operational
- Security class: Medium-security (with minimum-security prison camp)
- Capacity: 1,200 (213 in prison camp)
- Managed by: Federal Bureau of Prisons
- Warden: Susan Rudolph

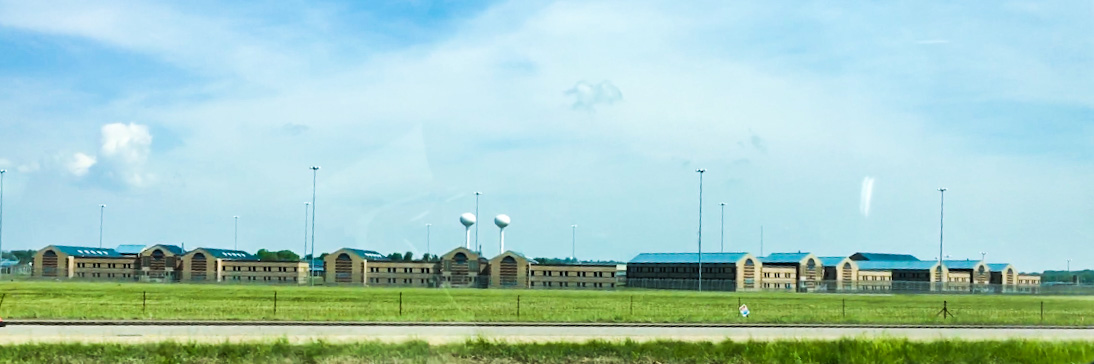
Federal Correctional Institution, Greenville as seen from I-70, May 2018

The Federal Correctional Institution Greenville (FCI Greenville) is a medium-security United States federal prison for male offenders in Illinois, with an adjacent satellite prison camp for minimum-security female offenders. It is operated by the Federal Bureau of Prisons, a division of the United States Department of Justice.

FCI Greenville is located approximately 43 miles east of St. Louis, Missouri, and 63 miles from Springfield, Illinois.

== History ==
The prison camp was turned into a women's facility in 2000 in order to make more space for women in the north central U.S.

== Notable incidents ==
In 2001, David Mack, a central figure in the LAPD Rampart Scandal, was attacked by a group of fellow inmates while jogging in the prison recreation yard at FCI Greenville. The Bureau of Prisons and the FBI refused to confirm that the attack occurred, but Mack's attorney reported that the inmates were gang members who attacked Mack after they saw a television program and read press accounts that detailed Mack's role in stealing from gang members and his connection with fellow officer Rafael Perez, another central figure in the scandal. Mack was taken to a local hospital and was treated for multiple stab wounds and a punctured lung. He was released two days later and returned to the prison.

== Notable inmates (current and former) ==
Inmate name	Register number	Status	Details
Terry M. Helvey	13867-045	Sentenced to life by court-martial	Former Airman Apprentice who brutally murdered United States Navy Radioman Petty Officer Third Class Allen R. Schindler Jr. in a public toilet in Sasebo, Nagasaki in 1992 for being gay. Helvey was transferred to the FCI from the United States Disciplinary Barracks at Fort Leavenworth.
David Mack	12866-112	Released from custody in 2010; served 12 years.	Former LAPD officer involved in the Rampart Scandal; convicted in 1998 of masterminding the armed robbery of a Los Angeles bank in 1997 during which $722,000 was stolen; suspected of being involved in planning the 1997 murder of rapper Notorious B.I.G.
Michael Curtis Reynolds	10671-023	Serving a 30-year sentence; scheduled for release in 2032.	Convicted of plotting to blow up U.S. oil pipeline and energy installations, attempting to enlist Al-Qaeda members on the internet, and possessing a hand grenade.
Walter Bond	37096-013	Released on March 4, 2021.	Member of the Animal Liberation Front; pleaded guilty in 2011 to arson in connection with 2010 fires at three businesses in Utah and Colorado; author of Always Looking Forward, Liberation Press, 2011.
Ed Buck	78687-112	Serving a 30 year sentence. Scheduled for release in 2045.	Democratic Party Donor who injected two people with fatal doses of crystal methamphetamine.
Derrick Shareef	22344-424	Serving a 35-year sentence; scheduled for release in 2036. Currently at FCI Milan.	US citizen and Al-Qaeda supporter; pleaded guilty in 2007 to the attempted use of weapons of mass destruction for plotting to detonate grenades at the Cherryvale Mall in Illinois during Christmas shopping season in 2006.
Patrick Houston	17959-076	Released from custody in 2005; served 4 years.	Rapper known as Project Pat; charged in 2001 with violating his parole for aggravated robbery; convicted in 2001 of being a felon in possession of a firearm.

== See also ==
- List of U.S. federal prisons
- Federal Bureau of Prisons
- Incarceration in the United States
