= Angela's Eyes =

- Created by: Dan McDermott
- Directed by: Mike Rohl; Chris Grismer
- Starring: Abigail Spencer; Lyriq Bent; Joe Cobden; Rick Roberts; Paul Popowich; Boyd Gaines; Alberta Watson
- Opening theme: "Scream" by Berlin
- Composer: James Raymond
- Country of origin: United States
- Original language: English
- No. of seasons: 1
- No. of episodes: 13

Production
- Executive producers: Tom Nunan; Cathy Schulman; Dan McDermott; Scott Shepherd
- Running time: 60 minutes
- Production companies: McDermott Entertainment; Bull's Eye Entertainment; NBC Universal Television Studio

Original release
- Network: Lifetime
- Release: July 16 – October 15, 2006

Angela's Eyes is an American crime drama series that aired from July 16 until October 15, 2006 on Lifetime, running for 13 episodes on Sunday evenings. Lifetime announced that the show would not be picked up for a second season due to lower than expected ratings.

== Premise ==
Angela's Eyes followed Angela Henson Anderson, an FBI agent who had a gift for knowing when people were lying by reading their body language. Her imprisoned parents Colin and Lydia Anderson were the two most notorious spies in the U.S. After an adolescence haunted by their mistakes, Angela decided to put her gift of seeing liars to good use and spend her time putting away the "bad guys".

== Cast ==
- Abigail Spencer as Angela Anderson Henson
- Lyriq Bent as Leo Jenkins
- Joe Cobden as Dozer
- Rick Roberts as Gene Taylor
- Paul Popowich as Jerry Anderson
- Boyd Gaines as Colin Anderson
- Alberta Watson as Lydia Anderson

== Episodes ==
Every title of the episodes contains the word "eye" excluding "Pilot".

No.	Title	Directed by	Written by	Original release date
1	"Pilot"	Michael Watkins	Dan McDermott	July 16, 2006
Angela finds a millionaire's missing wife and exposes a plan to launder her husband's money. Angela's romance with new boyfriend Peter is threatened by her trust issues, and a visit to her father in prison leads Angela to the family's time capsule—only to find it has recently been removed.
2	"Eyes for Windows"	Milan Cheylov	Dan McDermott	July 23, 2006
Angela saves a news anchor from a crazed stalker but a sudden realization leads to her abandoning Peter at her friend's wedding. Frustrated by her suspicious nature, he ends the relationship. Jerry, her trouble-making brother, who believes their parents are innocent, makes an unexpected visit.
3	"In God's Eyes"	Rick Rosenthal	Story by : Tom Nunan; Teleplay by : Scott Shepherd	July 30, 2006
Angela usually has no problems interrogating witnesses and suspects, but she finds it challenging to question a priest covering up for someone else. Lydia is sick and needs her daughter's bone marrow to survive, which puts Angela in a quandary.
4	"Eyes of the Father"	Elodie Keene	Tracey Stern	August 6, 2006
While in hospital for the bone marrow transplant, Angela meets a medical intern named Dylan; they have instant chemistry. Angela is surprised to see her boss Gene and her mother meeting in the hospital room. Gene has clearly been keeping secrets.
5	"Undercover Eyes"	Chris Grismer	Jessica Queller	August 13, 2006
Angela goes undercover as a substitute teacher at a high school to bust a drug ring. She comes close to death, but is rescued by her partner Leo just in time. Angela tries to make amends with Gene, even though he is still not being honest about his visits to her mother.
6	"Political Eyes"	Mike Rohl	Erin Maher & Kay Reindl	August 20, 2006
Angela spends her birthday searching for a missing opera singer. Dylan patiently waits to spend time with her; he gets her a nice birthday present. Later her brother Jerry arrives with the family time capsule. Inside it is a photo of their parents with a mystery man.
7	"Open Your Eyes"	Mario Azzopardi	Victoria Strouse	August 27, 2006
The team faces one of their most dangerous assignments yet: they must recover a deadly virus that is being held for ransom. Angela meets the mystery man from her parents' past. He claims her parents are innocent and that they were working with the U.S. government to protect Russian defectors, but he is murdered before he has the chance to prove it.
8	"Blue-Eyed Blues"	Holly Dale	Dana Greenblatt	September 10, 2006
Angela helps free an abducted teenager, but the victim is reluctant to identify her captor. Angela realizes the girl is still under her kidnapper's spell and manages to prevent her from becoming a suicide bomber. Angela's mother gives her a cryptic message which leads her to a mysterious Russian document. Dylan tells Gene he can no longer spy on Angela as he has fallen in love with her.
9	"Lyin' Eyes"	Mike Rohl	Scott Shepherd	September 17, 2006
Angela is shot at home. As she struggles to survive, flashbacks show her recruitment to the FBI and her first case, in which she uses her body-reading ability to win at poker. Gene visits Lydia again, and promises to keep the truth from Angela. Jerry discovers Dylan's treachery.
10	"Eyes Wide Shut"	Jim Head	Tracey Stern	September 24, 2006
Leo's friend, an undercover police officer, is killed. His honesty is questioned, but the truth surprises Leo. Angela worries about her missing boyfriend.
11	"In Your Eyes"	Chris Grismer	Jessica Queller	October 1, 2006
Angela's friend and partner, technical wizard Dozer, is aboard a hijacked plane, and must handle the negotiation. Angela confronts Lydia about her lies. Her ex-boyfriend Peter resurfaces.
12	"The Camera's Eye"	Stuart Gillard	Victoria Strouse	October 8, 2006
Angela becomes involved with the art world when a controversial artist is killed and one of his paintings stolen. An assassin from the past is at large. Jerry tries to decrypt the Russian documents but then they are stolen.
13	"Eyes on the Prize"	Michael Robison	Story by : Tom Nunan; Teleplay by : Dan McDermott	October 15, 2006
The Russian documents seem to be related to the death of the local fixer. Angela hopes to learn the truth about her parents at last.
