= Murder of Allen R. Schindler Jr. =

American sailor murdered for being gay (1969–1992)

Allen R. Schindler Jr.
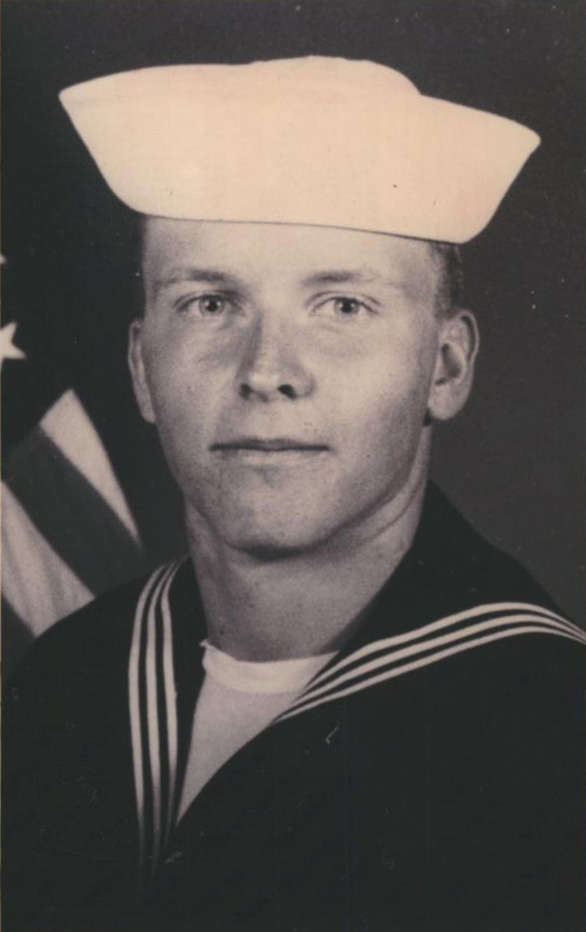
- Born: December 13, 1969; Chicago Heights, Illinois, U.S.
- Died: October 27, 1992 (aged 22); Sasebo, Nagasaki, Japan
- Military career
- Allegiance: United States
- Branch: United States Navy
- Rank: E4 Radioman 3rd Class

Allen R. Schindler Jr. (December 13, 1969 – October 27, 1992) was an American radioman petty officer third class in the United States Navy who was murdered for being gay. He was killed in a public toilet in Sasebo, Nagasaki, Japan, by Terry M. Helvey, who acted with the aid of an accomplice, Charles E. Vins, in what Esquire called a "brutal murder". The case became synonymous with the debate concerning LGBT members of the military that had been brewing in the United States, culminating in the "Don't ask, don't tell" policy.

Schindler's family was only able to identify him by the tattoos on his arms. His killing remained front-page news throughout the spring of 1993. The case was later featured in The New York Times and Esquire. The events surrounding Schindler's murder were the subject of ABC's 20/20 episode and were portrayed in the 1997 TV film Any Mother's Son. In 1998, Any Mother's Son won a GLAAD Media Award for Outstanding Made for TV Movie.

== Background ==
Allen R. Schindler Jr. was born on December 13, 1969, in Chicago Heights, Cook County, Illinois, to Dorothy Hajdys, now known as Clausen or Hajdys-Clausen, and Allen Schindler Sr. His parents divorced when he was four years old. Schindler was the third of four children and brought up in the Christian faith. He had two older sisters, Barbara and Kathy Eickhoff, and one younger half-sibling, William "Billy" Hajdys. Schindler came from a naval family; his grandfather served in World War II, and his stepfather survived the sinking of the USS Arizona at Pearl Harbor. Following in their footsteps, Schindler enlisted while in his junior year at Bloom High School. He graduated from Naval Station Great Lakes in November 1988.

Schindler served in the Navy for four years (1988–1992) as a radioman on the USS San Jose, the USS Midway, and on the amphibious assault ship USS Belleau Wood in Sasebo, Nagasaki, where he was serving at the time of his death.

In January 1991, Schindler was assigned to the USS Midway. The eleven months he spent aboard the ship were his happiest days in the Navy. Schindler received a patch for his involvement in the Desert Storm campaign. In December, Schindler was transferred to the USS Belleau Wood, and the harassment began almost immediately. According to several of his friends, Schindler had complained repeatedly of anti-gay harassment to his chain of command in March and April 1992, citing incidents such as the gluing-shut of his locker and frequent comments from shipmates such as "There's a faggot on this ship and he should die". Schindler's complaints continued to go unanswered. By September, he had reached his breaking point and requested to see the captain, but his request was denied. While on transport from San Diego, California, to Sasebo, the USS Belleau Wood made a brief stop in Pearl Harbor, Hawaii. Afterward, en route to Japan, Schindler broadcast an unauthorized statement "2-Q-T-2-B-S-T-R-8" (too cute to be straight) on secure lines reaching much of the Pacific Fleet.

On September 24, Schindler met with the Belleau Wood ship's executive officer. At the meeting and with the ship's chaplain present, Schindler formally declared he was gay and requested a transfer and discharge. Schindler also informed his commanding officer, Captain Douglas J. Bradt, and the ship's legal officer, Captain Bernard Meyer. He was told the processing of his discharge would take two weeks, but his superiors insisted he remain on his ship until the process was finished. Though he knew his safety was at risk, Schindler obeyed orders. The following day, Schindler was called to appear at captain's mast for the unauthorized radio message. He had requested that the hearing be closed for confidentiality, but Captain Bradt disregarded his request, and it was open, with two hundred to three hundred people in attendance. Schindler made no open admission of his homosexuality at the mast. Some shipmates took it as an invitation to harass him with impunity. Schindler's rank was reduced from RM1 to RM3, and he was placed on a thirty-day restriction aboard the ship. He was unable to leave the ship until a few weeks after arriving at Sasebo and four days before his death.

In the last days of his life, Schindler held a leadership position on the Belleau Wood, where he taught self-defense and political activism. Schindler was befriended by three civilian entertainers working in Sasebo, who were subsequently instrumental in bringing details surrounding his murder to public attention.

== Murder ==
On Tuesday, October 27, 1992, around 11:00 p.m., airman apprentice Terry M. Helvey, who was a member of the Belleau Wood ship's weather department (OA Division, Operations Department), and his accomplice, airman apprentice Charles E. Vins, followed Schindler into a public restroom in Sasebo Park near the U.S. naval base in Sasebo, Nagasaki. There, Helvey punched, choked, and kicked Schindler to the floor, then stomped him to death. Vins, who occasionally joined in, later recounted:

It looked like he was kicking a soccer ball. I kept hearing thuds every time he kicked him... Helvey kicked Schindler to the left side of his head at least five to ten times real hard. Blood was all over the place. His [Schindler's] face was covered with blood. Helvey then started down and began to kick and stomp on Schindler's chest and torso... Everything happened so fast. He used his right foot most of the time. I could not tell you how many times he kicked and stomped on his chest, but it was several. It lasted at least thirty seconds. The last thing he did before I left was I saw Helvey stomp on Schindler's throat. He stepped on his throat very hard and then put all his weight on it.

A key witness, Belleau Wood shipmate Jonathan Witte, saw Helvey repeatedly stomp on Schindler's body while singing. Witte then ran to retrieve shore patrolmen nearby, which startled Helvey and Vins into running from the restroom. Witte returned with Shore Patrolmen in less than 30 seconds and saw Schindler lying on the floor, struggling to breathe through a mouthful of blood. Witte and Shore Patrolmen carried Schindler to the nearby Albuquerque Bridge where he died from his injuries. Witte had met Schindler previously two days before his murder, but given the gravity of his injuries, he was unable to recognize Schindler. A second witness to the attack, Schindler's shipmate and friend Keith Sims, was also unable to recognize him. Schindler was taken to a medical clinic on the base at 11:50 p.m., where medical staff attempted to save his life for nineteen minutes. He was pronounced dead at 12:09 a.m. on October 28.

Schindler had "at least four fatal injuries to the head, chest, and abdomen." He had eight broken ribs, his face and head were crushed, and the globes of his eyes were burst and ruptured. His nose was broken; his upper jaw was broken; the whole middle portion of his face was detached and floating loosely. There were bruises and cuts on the surface of his neck, head, and chest; there were bruises on his brain, on his lungs, his heart. The pericardial sac around his heart was filled with 250 milliliters of blood, "enough to top off a juice glass." His liver had been turned to pulp "like a tomato smushed up inside its cover." The impact of blows to the chest had torn his aorta, with "a blunt force exceeding a 20 G force." His bladder had been ripped open, his penis had been bruised and lacerated, and he had "sneaker-tread marks stamped on his forehead and chest", destroying "every organ in his body", leaving behind a "nearly unrecognizable corpse." Jonathan Witte was asked to explain in detail to the military court what the crime scene looked like, but he refused, as Schindler's mother and sister were present in the courtroom. Navy Commander Edward Kilbane, the medical examiner who conducted the autopsy on Schindler's body, compared Schindler's injuries to those sustained by a victim of a fatal horse trampling, saying they were worse "than the damage to a person who'd been stomped by a horse; they were similar to what might be sustained in a high-speed car crash or a low-speed aircraft accident." After reading Schindler's medical report, Hajdys-Clausen said that "just about everything was damaged except his heart."

== Details revealed ==
The Navy was less than forthcoming about the details of the killing, both to the news media and to the victim's family, especially his mother, Dorothy Hajdys-Clausen. Navy officials failed to include his belongings: the log book Schindler kept of his time on board, and his record of harassment he was receiving on the advice of friends.

In the wake of Schindler's murder, the Navy denied that it had received any complaints of harassment and refused to speak publicly about the case or to release the Japanese police report on the murder.

Several Belleau Wood shipmates reported receiving harassment before and after Schindler's death. Keith Sims stated that he had reported Helvey and Vins to the ship's legal officer, Captain Bernard Meyer, but nothing was done in response. In the 2018 TV documentary crime series, The 1990s: The Deadliest Decade, Jonathan Witte stated that he had been personally threatened by Captain Bradt and the Belleau Wood executive officer.

The Navy dismissed its failure to inform Hajdys-Clausen of Vin's court martial as "a bureaucratic screw-up." With the help of veteran LGBTQ rights activists Michael Petrelis and Miriam Ben-Shalom, Hajdys-Clausen took Schindler's case to the public. In 2015, after 23 years of repeated Freedom of Information Act requests from Petrelis, the Navy released a conclusive 900-page report admitting Schindler was harassed. Petrelis stated:

Allen Schindler was destined to become yet another gay man killed and forgotten. Now, 23 years after his death, we finally share the full details of his murder. In doing so, we honor his memory on Veterans Day 2015. People must know the role that governmental homophobia played in his murder and the subsequent cover-up.

On November 7, 1992, a wake was held for Schindler in his hometown of Chicago Heights, Illinois. Schindler was buried with full military honors. The day before, when Schindler's family was called down to the funeral home, his mother requested that his coffin be opened after the Navy advised against it. "There was a sailor in dress blues ... but it looked nothing like the boy I'd kissed goodbye two months earlier," Hajdys-Clausen said. At the wake, Schindler's sister Kathy asked that the coffin be opened again. They could only identify him by the tattoos on his arms, as his face was so disfigured.

== Trial and outcomes ==
During the trial, Helvey denied that he killed Schindler because he was gay, stating, "I did not attack him because he was homosexual", but evidence presented by Navy investigator Kennon F. Privette from the interrogation of Helvey the day after the murder showed otherwise. "He said he hated homosexuals. He was disgusted by them," Privette said. On killing Schindler, Privette quoted Helvey as saying: "I don't regret it. I'd do it again. ... He deserved it." Helvey then told Privette he "always wondered what it would feel like to kill a man." When Privette suggested he express some remorse, Helvey blamed the attack on Schindler on the Navy, saying: "I regret this incident happened and I feel like it could have been averted had homosexuals not been allowed in the military."

On May 3, seeking to avoid a possible death sentence, Helvey pleaded guilty to unpremeditated murder, which carries a maximum sentence of life in prison.

On May 27, 1993, Helvey was convicted of murder by a military court and given a dishonorable discharge. Douglas J. Bradt, the captain who kept the incident quiet, was transferred to shore duty in Florida. Helvey is serving a life sentence. By statute, Helvey is granted a clemency hearing every year and has been eligible for parole since 2002. Initially, he was imprisoned in the United States Disciplinary Barracks. As of 2024, he is housed at FCI Greenville in Illinois under the inmate number 13867-045. Helvey's accomplice, Charles E. Vins, confessed to his part in the beating of Schindler, admitting that he kicked Schindler once in the head and three times in the ribs while he was on the floor. On November 23, 1992, Vins was allowed to plea bargain as guilty to the three lesser charges of failure to report a serious crime, concealing an offense, and resisting arrest. In exchange for testifying against Helvey, Vins was given a four-month sentence; he served a total of 78 days before receiving a general discharge from the Navy.

== Legacy ==
The events surrounding Schindler's murder were the subject of a 20/20 episode and were portrayed in the 1997 TV film Any Mother's Son. In 1998, Any Mother's Son won a GLAAD Media Award for Outstanding Made for TV Movie. In 2001, a description of Schindler's murder was among those featured in MTV's tribute to victims of hate crimes as part of their anti-discrimination campaign. In 1993, several candlelight vigils and marches were organized nationwide in response to the killing of Schindler. The artist and design team Bureau (Marlene McCarty and Donald Moffett) created a pair of posters to commemorate Schindler's life and condemn his murder. The posters titled 'In Honor of Allen R. Schindler' were distributed throughout New York City and exhibited nationally before being displayed at the New Museum in 2013. In a 2019 interview with Moffett, Dan Cameron recalled seeing the posters in 1993, saying:

You gave me a place to feel, 'I have the right to mourn Allen Schindler as a fellow human being who was butchered through hatred but deserves to be remembered with love as well.' And that's kind of about his place in nature, not his place in a social history.

Schindler's mother, Dorothy Hajdys-Clausen, became a gay rights activist after his death. In 1992 she received the National Leather Association International's Jan Lyon Award for Regional or Local Work. In April 1993 she marched in the March on Washington for Lesbian, Gay and Bi Equal Rights and Liberation, and on June 27, she led the Gay Pride Parade in Chicago. In 2011, Hajdys-Clausen went to Washington, D.C., to celebrate the repeal of DADT. "I'm so happy 'Don't Ask Don't Tell' got repealed." Dorothy said. "I just hope now there will be no more deaths like Allen Schindler's."

Schindler's case was presented in the 2018 TV documentary crime series, The 1990s: The Deadliest Decade, season 1, episode 8, "Don't Ask Don't Tell." The episode, which aired on January 7, 2019, on Investigation Discovery, chronicled the events that led up to Schindler's murder and featured excerpts from Schindler's journal and autopsy report, as well as detailing Michael Petrelis' 900-page file on Schindler and Helvey's written confession. Interviews were given by Petrelis, Hajdys-Clausen, Jonathan Witte, and former reporter for the Stars and Stripes, Rick Rogers.

In 2020, U.S. Navy veteran Shon Washington honored Schindler on the 28th anniversary of his death in a viral social media post sharing his experiences as a gay Navy officer serving under DADT. Washington ended the post by thanking Schindler and his mother for impacting his life and helping repair his fraught relationship with his own mother.

Schindler is buried in Evergreen Hill Memory Gardens in Steger, Will County, Illinois. The date of death on Schindler's gravestone is marked October 28, 1992, in accordance to the doctor's pronouncement of death.

== See also ==
- Murder of Barry Winchell
- Judge Advocate General's Corps
- Military justice
