= Cara Pifko =

Canadian actress

- Born: March 15, 1976 (age 50); Toronto, Ontario, Canada
- Occupation: Actress
- Years active: 1984–present
- Spouse: Gareth Bennett (m. 2004)
- Children: 2
- Relatives: Andrew Pifko (brother)

Cara Pifko (born March 15, 1976) is a Canadian actress known primarily for her work on television shows produced by the Canadian Broadcasting Corporation.

== Life and career ==
Pifko was born in Toronto, the youngest of three children to Esther Pifko (née Taub). Her older brother is Andrew, who is an actor in his own right. A graduate of the National Theatre School of Canada, she started acting at the age of 8 and worked all through the 1990s, but it was in 2000 that she landed her first starring role, in the series Our Hero, which was aimed at young teens. Her first acting role was The Elephant Show hosted by Sharon, Lois, and Bram in which she was present in all seasons.

In 2004, she showed her dramatic range by appearing as a foreign aid worker in the acclaimed mini-series Human Cargo. Pifko then landed the lead role in the legal drama This is Wonderland, which garnered her a Gemini Award in 2005 for best actress. In early 2006, she appeared as Isolda in Tarragon Theatre's production of Léo. In 2007, she starred in the Lifetime TV movie I Me Wed. In 2009, she joined the soap opera General Hospital as the recurring character of Louise Addison.

In 2010, Cara lent her voice to Suu, a pink Twi'lek in the "Deserter" episode, and as scientist Sionver Boll in "The Zillo Beast" and "The Zillo Beast Strikes Back" episodes of Star Wars: The Clone Wars. She also voiced Yeoman Kelly Chambers in the video games Mass Effect 2 and Mass Effect 3.

In 2016, she joined the Season 2 cast of Better Call Saul as recurring character Paige Novick, senior legal counsel for Mesa Verde Bank and Trust, and friend of Kim Wexler.

Cara also voiced Suu Lawquane in Star Wars: The Bad Batch.

== Personal life ==
Pifko has been married to Gareth Bennett since 2004, with whom she has two children.

== Filmography ==
=== Film ===
Year	Title	Role	Notes
1993	Ordinary Magic	Lucy	
1996	Mariette in Ecstasy	Sister Hermance	
1999	Below the Belt	Jill	Short
2000	CyberWorld	Computer (voice)	Short
2001	One of Them	Carla	Short
2002	Interviews with My Next Girlfriend	Woman with Nose Piercing	Short
2003	Name of the Rose	Kim	
2005	The Unfolding	Sadie	Short
2007	Beth	Beth	Short
2014	The Possession of Michael King	Samantha	
2015	Sharkskin	Franki	
2015	Paranormal Activity: The Ghost Dimension	Laura	
2018	Ready Player One	Leslee	

=== Television ===
Year	Title	Role	Notes
1984–88	The Elephant Show	Cara / Various	Recurring role
1993	Family Pictures	Mary (age 13–15)	TV film
1993	Are You Afraid of the Dark?	Mariah	Episode: "The Tale of the Dark Dragon"
1994	Incident in a Small Town	Nancy	TV film
1996	Road to Avonlea	Mavis Pritchard	Episodes: "Out of the Ashes", "Davey and the Mermaid", "So Dear to My Heart"
1999–2001	Angela Anaconda	Josephine Praline (voice)	Recurring role
1999	The City	Ariel	Episode: "Haunted"
2000	The Royal Diaries: Isabel - Jewel of Castilla	Catalina	TV film
2000	Sailor Moon	Saori (voice)	Cloverway dub
2000	Twice in a Lifetime	Young Delia Harmony	Episode: "The Night Before Christmas"
2000–02	Our Hero	Kale Stiglic	Lead role
2001	Life with Judy Garland: Me and My Shadows	Dorothy Virginia "Jimmie" Gumm (adult)	TV miniseries
2002	Master Spy: The Robert Hanssen Story	Jane Hanssen	TV film
2002	Moville Mysteries	Beverly (voice)	Episode: "Curse of the Mommies"
2002	Salem Witch Trials	Marry Warren	TV film
2003	Blue Murder	Allison Barrow	Episode: "Ladykillers"
2003	Bliss	Marie	Episode: "Chastity"
2003	Miss Spider's Sunny Patch Kids	Eunice Earwig (voice)	TV film
2003	Missing	Vera	Episode: "Ties That Bind"
2004	Human Cargo	Helen Wade	TV miniseries
2004–06	This Is Wonderland	Alice De Raey	Main role
2004–06	Miss Spider's Sunny Patch Friends	Eunice Earwig (voice)	Recurring role
2006	CSI: Miami	Donna Hicks	Episode: "Come as You Are"
2007	Without a Trace	Nora Manning	Episode: "One and Only"
2007	The Jane Show	Beth	Episodes: "Till Beth Do Us Part", "Who's Got Spirit?"
2007	I Me Wed	Amy	TV film
2008	Charlie & Me	Dr. Fran Gilford	TV film
2008	For the Love of Grace	Jen	TV film
2008–17	Heartland	Mackenzie Hutton	Episodes: "Corporate Cowgirls", "Divorce Horse", "Our Sons and Daughters"
2009	General Hospital	ADA Louise Addison	Recurring role
2010–12	Star Wars: The Clone Wars	Dr. Sionver Boll / Suu Lawquane / Various (voice)	Recurring role
2011	Flashpoint	Kerry McCormick	Episode: "Collateral Damage"
2011	NCIS	Kelsey Donner	Episode: "Dead Reflection"
2012	Castle	Roberta Cambridge	Episode: "Dial M For Mayor"
2012	CSI: NY	Rachel Moore	Episode: "Where There's Smoke"
2013	Monday Mornings	Beth Hostetler	Episodes: "Pilot", "Deus Ex Machina", "Forks Over Knives"
2016–20	Better Call Saul	Paige Novick	Recurring role; 16 episodes
2016	Rosewood	Barbara Gaines	Episode: "Thorax, Thrombosis & Threesomes"
2018	The Fosters	Natalie	Episodes: "Mother's Day", "Giving Up The Ghost"
2021	Star Wars: The Bad Batch	Suu Lawquane (voice)	Episode: "Cut and Run"

=== Video games ===
Year	Title	Role	Notes
2010	Mass Effect 2	Yeoman Kelly Chambers, Lia'Vael, Idenna Quarian	
2010	Kinect Adventures!	Amelia	English version
2012	Mass Effect 3	Yeoman Kelly Chambers, additional voices	
2012	Guild Wars 2	Valka	
2013	God of War: Ascension	Bliss Whore	
2018	Final Fantasy XV	Garuda (FFXIV version)	Final Fantasy XIV Collab
