= Scott Shepherd =

Scott Shepherd may refer to:

- Scott Shepherd (actor)
- Scott Shepherd (producer)
- Scott Shepherd (footballer) (born 1996), Scottish football player (Forfar Athletic FC)

== See also ==
- Scott S. Sheppard, American astronomer
