= Any Mother's Son =

1997 American television film

- DVD cover
- Based on: Murder of Allen Schindler
- Written by: Bruce Harmon
- Directed by: David Burton Morris
- Starring: Bonnie Bedelia; Hedy Burress; Paul Popowich; Scott Gibson; Michael Gabriel
- Music by: Pray for Rain
- Country of origin: United States
- Original language: English

Production
- Producers: Joan Barnett; Joseph DiPasquale; Jack Grossbart
- Cinematography: John L. Demps Jr.
- Editor: Michael S. Murphy
- Running time: 90 min

Original release
- Network: Lifetime
- Release: August 11, 1997

Any Mother's Son is a 1997 American made-for-television drama film directed by David Burton Morris. The movie is based on a true story, the murder of Allen Schindler, a United States Navy sailor who was killed for being gay. The film stars Bonnie Bedelia, Hedy Burress, Sada Thompson and Paul Popowich. It premiered on August 11, 1997, on Lifetime. The movie won the GLAAD Media Award for Outstanding Made for TV Movie, and Bedelia was nominated for a CableACE Award for Outstanding Actress in a Movie or Miniseries.

== Plot ==
In 1992, Allen Schindler, a 22-year-old navy sailor is brutally beaten to death so bad that his body could only be identified by the tattoos on his arms. The murder took place in a public restroom while Schindler was on leave in Sasebo, Japan. Schindler's mother Dorothy Hajdys, becomes distraught when the representatives of the Navy refuse to provide her with full details on her son's murder. However, a reporter from the Pacific Stars and Stripes informs Dorothy that her son was gay, which Hajdys didn't know, and that this might have been the reason he was killed. But if the Navy has anything to say about it, the entire matter will be swept under the rug. A deal has already been cut with an accomplice, who after a secret court-martial, received a four-month jail sentence, of which he served 78 days. Radicalized by the incident and its aftermath, Dorothy joins forces with a journalist to force the Navy to reveal the whole truth.

== Cast ==
- Bonnie Bedelia as Dorothy Hajdys
- Paul Popowich as Allen Schindler
- Hedy Burress as Kathy
- Sada Thompson as Gertie
- Fiona Reid as Doris
- Allan Royal as Ben
- Shawn Ashmore as Billy
- Mimi Kuzyk as Peggy Evans
- Peter Keleghan as Captain John Curtis
- Barry Flatman as Commander Stevens
- Scott Gibson as Terry Helvey
- Michael Gabriel as Charles Vins

== Production notes ==
The movie is told from Hajdys' point of view and based partly on official Navy documents, and the sworn statements of Terry M. Helvey and Charles E. Vins. Bruce Harmon, who wrote the script, collected a voluminous file on the case of Schindler and the sailors involved. Amongst the documents obtained is a four-page statement Helvey signed, saying "homosexuality is disgusting, sick and scary." The title of the film was selected by the real-life Dorothy Hajdys-Holman (remarried, currently known as Clausen or Hajdys-Clausen), and she received $65,000 for serving as the film's technical advisor. The movie was shot in Toronto, Canada, where parts of her house had been re-created. The Navy refused to cooperate with the production.

Bonnie Bedelia said she found the story astounding, having known gay colleagues throughout her career. She also said the emotional intensity of the role was more demanding than she had expected. Hajdys said Bedelia captures the heart of her story, and the first time she watched it, she cried through the whole thing. In one scene in the film, Hajdys has a confrontation with a Navy public relations officer, and bluntly tells him; "tell me, between my son and Charles Vins, who you think served the United States Navy and his country with honor?" Vins, who was contacted by the media prior to the film's release stated; "I don't feel the world needs to know my business".

== Critical reception ==
The Christian Science Monitor said that Bonnie Bedelia gave a strong performance, and she "is the best thing about this fact-based drama, which places more emphasis on weeping than solutions". Los Angeles Times review of the film stated, "the film does not tread lightly on Naval sensitivities, painting a stark picture of official obfuscation and secrecy...Bedelia gives a fine-tuned, understated performance as Hajdys' loss becomes part of the public discourse on both the military's then-ban on gays, and on societal attitudes that some take for tacit approval of the dehumanizing mistreatment of homosexuals".

A UK based review said Bedelia "turns in a stunning performance....from the broken emotion of losing her son to the revelation and confusion over her son being a homosexual you believe Bedelia's performance....but whilst [the movie] is good it feels restrained, toned down to not offend an audience with too much grit, drama and realism". Historian Stephen Tropiano said in his book The Prime Time Closet: A History of Gays and Lesbians on TV, it was a "powerful made-for-TV movie" and featured a "terrific performance from Bedelia as Schindler's mother".

== Nominations and awards ==
- CableACE Award for Outstanding Actress in a Movie or Miniseries (Bonnie Bedelia, nominated)
- GLAAD Media Award 1998 for Outstanding Made for TV Movie (winner)

== See also ==
- Soldier's Girl
- Violence against LGBT people
