= Fredric Lehne =

American actor (born 1959)

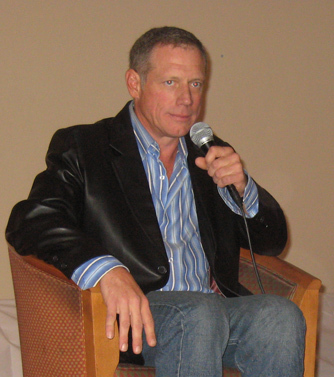
- Lehne at a Showmasters Convention, 2008
- Born: February 3, 1959 (age 67)
- Other name: Fredric Lane
- Occupation: Actor
- Years active: 1978–present

Fredric Lehne (born February 3, 1959) (sometimes credited as Fredric Lane) is an American actor of film, stage, voice and television.

Acting since 1978, he has appeared in more than 200 films, miniseries, and television episodes, as well as stage productions across the United States, from Broadway to Portland, Oregon. He is best known for his role as the demon Azazel on the long-running television show Supernatural, and has also appeared as Marshal Edward Mars on Lost, as Eddie in the original television series Dallas, and as Frank McCann on American Horror Story.

Lehne appeared in such miniseries/television movies as the original Billionaire Boys Club, From the Earth to the Moon and Coward of the County. His film credits include Ordinary People, Being There, Men in Black, Con Air, Zero Dark Thirty, and The Dark Knight Rises.

== Filmography ==
=== Film ===
Year	Title	Role	Notes
1979	Being There	TV Page	
1980	Ordinary People	Lazenby	
1980	Foxes	Bobby	
1993	Dream Lover	Larry	
1993	Man's Best Friend	Perry	
1995	Bombmeister	unknown role	
1997	Con Air	Pilot	
1997	Men in Black	INS Agent Janus	
1998	Turnaround	unknown role	
1999	Anoosh of the Airways	Security Guard	
1999	Under Contract	Al Smith	
2000	Fortress 2: Re-Entry	Gordon	
2000	Terror Tract	Louis Freemont	
2000	Submerged	Richard Layton	
2001	Octopus 2: River of Fear	Walter	
2002	Do It for Uncle Manny	Tommy Costanza	
2003	Air Strike	Col. Blackwell	
2004	Dynamite	Tom Baxter	
2012	The Dark Knight Rises	Exchange Security Chief	
2012	Zero Dark Thirty	The Wolf	
2015	The Runner	Senator Owens	
2015	Surviving Me: The Nine Circles of Sophie	Professor Slateman	
2016	Tallulah	Russell	
2016	Money	Carl	
2016	Split	Dave	
2016	Greater	Coach Bender	
2017	The Greatest Showman	Mr. Hallet	
2019	Human Capital	Detective Flowers	
2021	The Eyes of Tammy Faye	Fred Grover	
2023	Fast Charlie	Sal	

=== Television ===
Year	Title	Role	Notes
1978	In the Beginning	Frank	Episode: "The Good Thief"
1978	Eight Is Enough	Cory Larson	Episode: "All the Vice President's Men"
1979	Studs Lonigan	Young Weary	Miniseries
1979	How the West Was Won	Jacob Kelsay	Episode: "The Innocent"
1980	Skag	Paul	Episode: "In Trouble at 15"
1980	Seizure: The Story of Kathy Morris	Patrick Morris	TV movie
1980	Family	Rob	Episode: "Hard Times"
1980	All God's Children	Howard Naponic	TV movie
1980	Baby Comes Home	Franklin Kramer	TV movie
1981	Coward of the County	Tommy Spencer	TV movie
1981	The Children Nobody Wanted	Tom Butterfield	TV movie
1982	Cagney & Lacey	Burt	Episode: "Mr. Lonelyhearts"
1983	This Girl For Hire	Peter	TV movie
1984	The Seduction of Gina	David Breslin	TV movie
1984–1985	Dallas	Eddie Cronin	19 episodes
1985	Love Is Never Silent	William Anglin	TV movie
1985	Finder of Lost Loves	Dan Matthews	Episode: "Connections"
1987	American Harvest	Roger Duncan	TV movie
1987	Billionaire Boys Club	Chris Fairmont Jr.	TV movie
1987, 1996	Murder, She Wrote	Lloyd Nichols / Al Parker	2 episodes
1988	Man Against the Mob	Sammy Turner	TV movie
1988	Hotel	Brian Andrews	Episode: "Grand Designs"
1988	Favorite Son	E. Ben Wyckoff	Episode: "Part One"
1988–1989	China Beach	Rick White	2 episodes
1989	Amityville 4: The Evil Escapes	Father Kibbler	TV movie
1989–1990	Mancuso, F.B.I.	Eddie McMasters	20 episodes
1990	Wiseguy	Winston Chambers III	3 episodes
1990	Terror on Highway 91	Charlie Stone	TV movie
1991	This Gun for Hire	Mather	TV movie
1991	Deadly Game	Osiris	TV movie
1992	Civil Wars	Mike Ruffalo	Episode: "Pro Se Can You See"
1992	Human Target	Mike	Episode: "Cool Hand Chance"
1993	Matlock	John Page	Episode: "The Singer"
1994	Time Trax	Morgan Pierce	Episode: "Catch Me If You Can"
1995	Renegade	Robert Hudley	Episode: "Repo Raines"
1995	Babylon 5	Ranger	Episode: "The Coming of Shadows"
1995	Courthouse	Mr. Hagan	Episode: "Child Support"
1996	Diagnosis: Murder	Tom Winston	Episode: "Living on the Streets Can Be Murder"
1996	NYPD Blue	Mark Drennan	Episode: "Girl Talk"
1996	Sliders	Phil	Episode: "Dead Man Sliding"
1997	Two Voices	David Anneken	TV movie
1997	ER	Bum's Friend	Episode: "Post Mortem"
1997	Spy Game	CJ	Episode: "Dead and Gone, Honey"
1997	Payback	Sgt. Brian Kaleen	TV movie
1997	Chicago Hope	Ellis Cooper	Episode: "Sympathy for the Devil"
1998	Inferno	Lt. Sympson	TV movie
1998	From the Earth to the Moon	Astronaut Walt Cunningham	2 episodes
1998	Nothing Sacred	Jimmy	Episode: "A Nun's Story"
1998–1999	The X-Files	Young Arthur Dales	2 episodes
1998, 2000	Touched by an Angel	Eric	2 episodes
1999	Balloon Farm	Jake Johnson	TV movie
2001	V.I.P.	Adam Fowler	Episode: "Millennium Man"
2001	Any Day Now	Mr. Saunder	Episode: "Blinded By the White"
2001, 2009	CSI: Crime Scene Investigation	Curt Ritten / Frank Carrow	2 episodes
2002	Boomtown	Reggie Flood	Episode: "Insured by Smith & Wesson"
2002	Crossing Jordan	John Roberts	Episode: "One Twelve"
2002–2004	JAG	Capt. Banes/Commander Mark Collins	2 episodes
2003	Firefly	Ranse Burgess	Episode: "Heart of Gold"
2003	Cold Case	Sam Royal	Episode: "Hitchhiker"
2004	NCIS: Naval Criminal Investigative Service	Captain Graves	Episode: "Dead Man Talking"
2004–2010	Lost	Marshal Edward Mars	11 episodes
2005	CSI: NY	Ross Lee	Episode: "Tanglewood"
2005	Malcolm in the Middle	Officer Ridley	Episode: "Billboard"
2005	Night Stalker	Mr. Carver	Episode: "Malum"
2005	Without a Trace	George	Episode: "The Innocents"
2006	E-Ring	General Moyer	Episode: "Acceptable Losses"
2006	The Book of Daniel	Police Officer	Episode: "Temptation"
2006	Medium	David Delaney	Episode: "Allison Wonderland"
2006	Bones	Giles Hardewicke	Episode: "The Man with the Bone"
2006–2007	Ghost Whisperer	Charlie Banks	2 episodes
2006–2010	Supernatural	Azazel	4 episodes
2007	Day Break	unknown role	Episode: "What If He's Free?"
2007	The Closer	Eugene "Topper" Barnes	Episode: "Til Death Do Us Part: Part II"
2007	Claire	Ben Goodrow	TV movie
2008	Eli Stone	Soldier	Episode: "Father Figure"
2008	Saving Grace	Richard	Episode: "It's a Fierce, White-Hot, Mighty Love"
2008	The Starter Wife	Steve	Episode: "Mollywood"
2008	Finnegan	Chief John Hannon	TV movie
2008, 2017	Criminal Minds	Jack Vaughan	2 episodes
2009	Lie to Me	Company Owner Kevin Warren	Episode: "Life Is Priceless"
2009	The Mentalist	Marshal Exley	Episode: "Red Sauce"
2009	Last of the Ninth	Riley	Episode: "Pilot"
2009, 2013	Law & Order: Special Victims Unit	Clive Lynwood / Warden Jones	2 episodes
2010	Justified	SWAT Commanding Officer	Episode: "Blowback"
2010	Rubicon	Col. Mitchell	2 episodes
2011	Big Love	Dennis Innes	2 episodes
2011	Castle	Addison Smith	Episode: "Demons"
2012	American Horror Story: Asylum	Frank McCann	7 episodes
2013	The Ordained	The Penitent	TV movie
2013	Boardwalk Empire	Owney Madden	2 episodes
2014	Revenge	Detective	Episode: "Homecoming"
2014	The Red Road	Detective Alcala	2 episodes
2014	Crisis	General Mark Osborne	2 episodes
2014–2015	Blue Bloods	Chief Trumball	2 episodes
2015	Public Morals	Tommy Red	7 episodes
2015	Chicago Fire	Chief Ray Riddle	7 episodes
2016	Feed the Beast	Kevin Mahoney	2 episodes
2017	Quantico	Maxwell Fletcher	3 episodes
2017	Preacher	Saltonstall	Episode: "Pig"
2017	The Blacklist	Leon Cox	Episode: "Ilyas Surkov (No. 54)"
2018	Seven Seconds	Peter Jablonski Sr.	3 episodes
2018	Homeland	General Rossen	2 episodes
2018	Madam Secretary	John Dalton	Episode: "The Unnamed"
2018	Yellowstone	Carl Reynolds	3 episodes
2018	Mr. Mercedes	Det. Daniel Marks	2 episodes
2018–2022	Westworld	Colonel Brigham	2 episodes
2019	Bull	Judge Wanecraft	Episode: "Don't Say a Word"
2019	Bluff City Law	Tommy	2 episodes
2020	The Right Stuff	Alan B. Shepard Sr.	Episode: "Advent"
2021	Dr. Death	Don Duntsch	6 episodes
2021	Evil	Mick Carr	Episode: "C Is For Cop"
2021	FBI: International	Steve Webb	Episode: "Secrets as Weapons"
2021	Dexter: New Blood	Edward Olsen	3 episodes
2022	Partner Track	Ted Lassiter	5 episodes
2023	The Rookie: Feds	Jack Twohey	Episode: "Red One"
2024	Elsbeth	Lieutenant Dave Noonan	7 episodes
2024	Law & Order	Captain Greg Stockwell	Episode: "Bad Apple"
2025	Zero Day	Bob Schreier	

=== Video games ===
Year	Title	Role	Notes
1995	Silent Steel	Lt. Wheeler	
2012	Spec Ops: The Line	Additional voices	
