= I Me Wed =

- Poster
- Written by: Julie Sherman Wolfe
- Directed by: Craig Pryce
- Starring: Erica Durance; Paul Popowich; Cara Pifko; Janet-Laine Green
- Music by: James Gelfand
- Countries of origin: United States; Canada
- Original language: English

Production
- Producers: Neil Bregman; Ric Nish; Jesse Prupas
- Cinematography: Stephen Reizes
- Editor: Jean Beaudoin
- Running time: 90 minutes
- Production companies: Muse Entertainment Enterprises; Sound Venture Productions

Original release
- Network: Lifetime
- Release: July 29, 2007

I Me Wed is a 2007 Lifetime romantic comedy film starring Erica Durance and directed by Craig Pryce. The film is about Isabel Darden, a successful, attractive 30-year-old woman, who grows tired of people asking her "when are you going to get married?" She decides to honor the person she loves the most, by tying the knot with herself. The film was released under the title Marry Me in Sweden on August 15, 2010.

== Plot ==
Boston based home renovator Isabel Darden, is a successful, attractive 30-year-old woman. Isabel feels happy with her single life and loves herself. But her mother and friends are concerned, she will be a spinster if she doesn't find a husband soon. They constantly nag her about dating and finding the right man. When yet another blind date turns into a nightmare, Isabel decides to do something that will forever keep her friends and mother out of her hair. She announced that she will take their advice and marry the one person who knows her better than anyone else: herself. Much to her mother Lillian and her best friend Amy's disgust.

Isabel begins planning her wedding with the help of her very enthusiastic gay friend, Bill. As Isabel and Bill amuse themselves with the details of organizing her nuptials, Isabel is confident that she will finally get some peace from the wedding obsessed crowd, and she will also be making a statement for single women all over the world. What started as a small event starts to get out of hand, when the story hits the Internet. However, after meeting with her contractor's handsome and intelligent son, Colin, at first, she assumes that this man won't live up to her standards, but after a few romantic dates, it begins to dawn on Isabel that Colin may, in fact, be a better life partner for her than the one she's already planning to marry. As the wedding date approaches and the preparations escalate, Isabel knows that she must let Colin know about her wedding plans. Unfortunately, her numerous attempts to tell him about the wedding are overshadowed by their growing romance, and Colin soon finds out about Isabelle's plans to marry herself after it was announced on national television.

Colin wants her to put a stop to the wedding and save it for their wedding someday in the future. Although Isabel kind of wants to, she can't since she is already noticed by the media and inspiring to women all over the world. Frustrated by Isabelle's failure to tell him about her upcoming wedding and about the repercussions of being known by the public as that "schmuck" who wouldn't marry his girlfriend Colin decides he can't date a woman who is about to marry herself and the pair splits up. When Isabel is about to get married, she explains to everyone about how she wanted a simple ceremony in the park with a sundress. Isabel runs out of the room and comes back with casual clothes instead of the wedding dress. At the end, Isabel is married to Colin.

== Cast ==
- Erica Durance as Isabelle Darden
- Paul Popowich as Colin
- Cara Pifko as Amy
- Janet-Laine Green as Lillian Darden
- Thom Allison as Bill
- Vlasta Vrána as Roy
- Meaghan Rath as Tracy

== Production ==
I Me Wed was filmed in Toronto and Ottawa, Ontario, Canada.
