= Favorite Son (miniseries) =

1988 miniseries

Favorite Son is a miniseries about political intrigue that aired on NBC in three parts from October 30 to November 1, 1988, a week before that year's presidential election. It starred Harry Hamlin, Linda Kozlowski, James Whitmore, Robert Loggia, John Mahoney, Ronny Cox, and Jason Alexander. The miniseries was adapted from the 1987 novel of the same written by Steve Sohmer, who also wrote the teleplay.

== Plot ==
Favorite Son follows the apparent rise of Terrence "Terry" Fallon (Hamlin), a young and charismatic U.S. Senator from Texas. Fallon is idealistic and a vocal anti-Communist. One morning, during an outdoor press conference in Washington, D.C., Fallon is delivering a speech welcoming Col. Octavio Martinez, the leader of the Nicaraguan Contras. A sniper from a nearby rooftop fires on them, instantly killing Martinez and wounding Fallon. The television and cable networks that are covering the press conference as routine news then begin broadcasting the unfolding events live. Fallon, who is bleeding from his side, manages to crawl to Martinez's dead body and then stagger to the podium. With tens of millions of people watching him live on television, Fallon delivers a passionate speech, condemning Martinez's murder and asking how Americans can turn their backs on people who are fighting for their freedom against oppression. Fallon soon collapses and is rushed to a hospital. Fallon's words and his courage stun the nation, and overnight, he becomes a household name and the hottest political property in Washington, D.C.

Meanwhile, about 10 days before his party's convention, President Sam Baker (Whitmore) is facing a difficult re-election campaign. His chief of staff, Lou Brenner (Mahoney), suggests that he can win by selecting the now-popular Fallon as his running mate and dropping the current Vice President Daniel Eastman (Mitchell Ryan) from the ticket. Baker is reluctant to pick Fallon, not knowing much about him and wondering if he qualified since he may occupy the Oval Office one day. For his part, Eastman refuses to go quietly, and his top aide, E. Ben Wycoff (Frederic Lehne), begins plotting to undermine Fallon by digging into his background. In both the novel and the miniseries, political parties are not named but referred to generically as the "party." President Baker, Vice President Eastman, Senator Fallon, and Speaker of the House Charles MacDonald all belong to the same political party.

Serving Fallon are Sally Crain (Kozlowski), his top press aide (and secret lover), and Chris Van Allen (Alexander), another top aide (and a homosexual). Crain, who is ruthlessly devoted to Fallon, first met him when he was running for a seat on the Houston City Council in the late 1970s. She carefully plots the young Senator's path to the vice presidency and then possibly the presidency. However, secrets from both Fallon's and Crain's pasts may derail their ambitions.

President Baker also holds a meeting with Brenner, FBI director Henry O'Brien (Kenneth McMillan), and CIA director Admiral William Reiker (Ronny Cox) about the shooting. Based on eyewitness testimony, O'Brien identifies the sniper as Rolf Petersen (Brian Thompson), an ex-Marine and former CIA agent who went rogue. Brenner openly suggests that the disclosure that a former CIA agent assassinated Martinez might damage relations with the United States' Latin American allies. Without the president's knowledge, Brenner intimidates O'Brien into running a low-key investigation that just goes through the motions.

O'Brien appoints only two agents, Nick Mancuso (Loggia), a cynical, bitter veteran who is close to retirement, and Dave Ross (Lance Guest), an idealistic but inexperienced young agent, to investigate the Martinez assassination. Ross is delighted with the assignment, but Mancuso explains that it's a setup because if the bureau was serious about finding the sniper, "they would have assigned a whole division" of FBI agents to the case and not just "a lameduck and a green kid." Mancuso and Ross, however, pursue the case. Through a friend at the CIA, Mancuso learns about Petersen, who is still lurking in the area and thought to be plotting a second attempt on Fallon's life, and must track him down. Mancuso and Ross gradually uncover different conspiracies that may shake the U.S. government to its foundations.

== Main cast ==
- Harry Hamlin, U.S. Senator Terrence Fallon of Texas and vice presidential aspirant.
- Linda Kozlowski, Sally Crain, Senator Fallon's longtime press aide.
- James Whitmore, President Sam Baker, serving his first term
- Robert Loggia, Nick Mancuso, veteran FBI agent whose career with the bureau dates back to the early 1950s
- Mitchell Ryan, Vice President Daniel Eastman
- John Mahoney, Lou Brenner, White House Chief of Staff
- Ronny Cox, Admiral William Reiker, the CIA director
- Stepfanie Kramer, Stephanie "Stevie" Chandler, news director for a top, unnamed television network
- Jason Alexander, Chris Van Allen, a top aide to Fallon
- Richard Bradford, Speaker of the House Charlie MacDonnal
- Kenneth McMillan, FBI director Henry O'Brien
- Jon Cypher, FBI supervisor Barney Scott
- Brian Thompson, Rolf Petersen, an ex-Marine, former CIA agent and cold-blooded assassin
- Lance Guest, David Ross, FBI agent and Mancuso's rookie partner
- Lynette Mettey, Elaine Rose
- Joseph Chapman, Rodgers

== Reception ==
In his review in the New York Times, John J. O'Connor wrote that "'Favorite Son'...offers a portrait of contemporary values and governmental machinations that sets new high-water marks for cynicism. Making the exercise all the more startling, most of the scenario, cleverly echoing headlines of recent years, is thoroughly believable and, as American mini-series go, entertaining."

Favorite Son drew excellent ratings, and the second part even beat out the highly rated Monday Night Football on ABC. 21.5 million viewers watched the first part, 21.1 million watched the second, and 22.3 million the third.

== Sequel ==
Robert Loggia reprised the role of Nick Mancuso for the NBC series, Mancuso, FBI, which lasted one season in 1989-1990. Charles Siebert and Randi Brooks also reprised their roles from the miniseries and became part of the cast.

== VHS release ==
A shorter, edited version of the miniseries was released on VHS with the title, "Target: Favorite Son." To date, the complete miniseries has not been released on DVD.
