= Mancuso, F.B.I. =

American crime drama television series

- Genre: Crime drama
- Created by: Steve Sohmer
- Written by: Steve Sohmer; Ken Solarz; Gail Morgan Hickman; Wayne Powers; Donna Powers; Jacob Epstein
- Starring: Robert Loggia; Lindsay Frost; Fredric Lehne; Randi Brazen; Charles Siebert
- Country of origin: United States
- Original language: English
- No. of seasons: 1
- No. of episodes: 20

Production
- Executive producer: Steve Sohmer
- Producers: R. W. Goodwin; Jeff Bleckner; Ken Solarz; Gail Morgan Hickman
- Running time: 60 minutes
- Production companies: Steve Sohmer Productions; NBC Productions

Original release
- Network: NBC
- Release: October 13, 1989 – April 24, 1990

Mancuso, F.B.I. is an American crime drama television series created by Steve Sohmer, which was aired by NBC from October 13, 1989 to April 24, 1990, as part of its 1989–90 schedule.

Mancuso, F.B.I. stars Robert Loggia as Nick Mancuso, a hardened veteran of the Bureau now assigned to Washington, D.C., where he was largely regarded by his superiors and bureaucratic types as a maverick with little regard for agency rules and procedures. This charge was largely true; Mancuso's true motivation was, as a press release for the show near the time of its premiere described it, "a passionate love affair with the United States Constitution" and an overwhelming desire to see genuine justice rather than the mere appearance of it.

== Inspiration ==
Mancuso was based on Loggia's portrayal of the character in the NBC political miniseries Favorite Son, starring Harry Hamlin, which had aired the previous fall to high ratings. Mancuso was canceled at the end of the season. However, selected episodes were rerun by NBC as part of its summer prime time lineup in 1993.

Loggia earned an Emmy nomination as outstanding lead actor in a dramatic series for his performance.

"Nick Mancuso" is also a name shared by a real-life actor (NBC series Stingray, 1985–1987).

== Cast ==
- Robert Loggia as Nick Mancuso
- Randi Brazen as Jean St. John
- Frederic Lehne as Eddie McMasters
- Charles Siebert as Dr. Paul Summers
- Lindsay Frost as Kristen Carter

== Episodes ==
No.	Title	Directed by	Written by	Original release date
1	"Suspicious Minds"	Jeff Bleckner	Story by : Steve Bello & Jeff Bleckner & Steve Sohmer & Ken Solarz; Teleplay by : Ken Solarz & Steve Sohmer	October 13, 1989
4	"Little Saigon"	Bradford May	Story by : Ken Solarz & Steve Bello and Gail Morgan Hickman; Teleplay by : Gail Morgan Hickman	October 27, 1989
5	"Conflict of Interest"	Rob Bowman	Steve Sohmer and Edward Tivnan	November 3, 1989
6	"I Cover the Waterfront"	Jeff Bleckner	Ann Powell & Rose Schacht	November 10, 1989
2	"Weapons-Grade"	Bradford May	Story by : Steve Bello & Jeff Bleckner & Steve Sohmer & Ken Solarz; Teleplay by : Steve Bello & Ken Solarz	November 24, 1989
7	"Betrayal"	Vern Gillum	Story by : Ken Solarz & Gail Morgan Hickman & Steve Bello; Teleplay by : Ken Solarz & Gail Morgan Hickman	December 1, 1989
8	"Classified"	Roy Campanella II	Donna Dottley Powers & Wayne Powers	December 8, 1989
9	"Murder of Pearl"	Betty Thomas	Donna Powers, Wayne Powers, Steve Sohmer	December 22, 1989
3	"Racial Matters"	Win Phelps	Steve Sohmer	December 29, 1989
10	"Conspiracy"	Win Phelps	Gail Morgan Hickman & Ken Solarz	January 5, 1990
11	"Shall We Gdansk?"	Jim Johnston	Donna Powers, Wayne Powers, Steve Sohmer	January 12, 1990
12	"Ahami Awry Kidnapped"	Rob Bowman	R.W. Goodwin, Steve Sohmer	February 2, 1990
13	"Shiva Me Timbers"	Betty Thomas	Steve Sohmer, Steve Wasserman	February 9, 1990
14	"Kiss the Girls and Make Them Die"	Thomas J. Wright and Rob Bowman	Ken Solarz & Jacob Epstein & Donna Dottley Powers & Wayne Powers	February 16, 1990
15	"Kiss the Girls and Make Them Die"	Thomas J. Wright and Rob Bowman	Steve Sohmer	February 16, 1990
16	"Death and Taxes"	Roy Campanella II	Ann Donahue, Steve Sohmer	March 2, 1990
17	"Daryl Ross & The Supremes"	Charles Siebert	Barry M. Schkolnick, Steve Sohmer	March 16, 1990
18	"Night of the Living Shred"	Betty Thomas	Ken Solarz & Barry M. Schkolnick & Donna Dottley Powers & Wayne Powers	March 30, 1990
19	"Premature Congratulations"	Daniel Attias	Jacob Epstein, Jessica Klein, Steve Sohmer	April 6, 1990
20	"Adamant Eve"	Jeff Bleckner	Steve Sohmer	April 24, 1990
