= Crimes of Passion (1984 film) =

1984 film by Ken Russell

- Theatrical release poster
- Directed by: Ken Russell
- Written by: Barry Sandler
- Produced by: Barry Sandler
- Starring: Kathleen Turner; Anthony Perkins; John Laughlin
- Cinematography: Dick Bush
- Edited by: Brian Tagg
- Music by: Rick Wakeman
- Production companies: New World Pictures; China Blue Productions
- Distributed by: New World Pictures (United States); Orion Pictures International (International)
- Release date: October 19, 1984 (United States)
- Running time: 107 minutes
- Country: United States
- Language: English
- Budget: $3 million
- Box office: $2.9 million

Crimes of Passion is a 1984 American erotic thriller film directed by Ken Russell and starring Kathleen Turner, Anthony Perkins, and John Laughlin. The film explores themes of human relationships and mental illness. A mix of sex and suspense, the film opened to controversy over its content and to negative reviews.

== Plot ==
Bobby Grady is an ordinary middle-class electronics store owner who occasionally moonlights doing surveillance work. He attends a group therapy session because his wife, Amy, has lost interest in sex and he fears their marriage is in trouble.

Grady is soon approached by the owner of a fashion design house to spy on an employee, Joanna Crane, who is suspected of selling clothing patterns to his competitors. Grady discovers the accusations are unfounded, but also learns that Joanna is moonlighting as a prostitute under the name China Blue, and shedding her business attire for provocative clothing and a platinum wig.

Grady keeps quiet about Joanna's double life. Following a sexual encounter with her in her China Blue persona, Grady begins seeing her on a regular basis, first professionally, then romantically. However, their involvement is complicated by his guilt and her intimacy issues—in addition to her clientele of regular patrons and their bizarre sexual fetishes.

Among them is the "Reverend" Peter Shayne, (Note: It is never clarified whether the character is a real, ordained clergyman or merely pretends to be one.) who alternately spends his time delivering soapbox sermons on the street, visiting peep shows while sniffing amyl nitrite, and patronizing prostitutes. Shayne has been seeing China Blue as a customer and declares a need to save her. Underscoring Shayne's contradictory nature is the cache of sex toys he carries in a small doctor's bag with his Bible.

Grady admits he may leave his wife and children, but Joanna feels put-upon and depressed. She seeks solace in turning tricks because the encounters are not fraught with emotional entanglements. She dominates a young policeman in an S&M session, penetrating him with his nightstick, and endures a botched threesome in a limousine. A session with a dying man whose wife wants China Blue to give him sexual gratification one last time inspires Joanna to reveal her real first name, suggesting for the first time that she is the proverbial "hooker with a heart of gold"—and compelling her to begin facing the truth about herself and her double life.

Shayne grows increasingly psychotic: he carries a sharpened metallic vibrator he nicknames "Superman" and starts stalking Joanna. He moves into a seedy motel next door to her nighttime place of business and watches her activities through a peephole. He also sets up a shrine with candles and numerous photos of her. Sensing that he is mentally unhinged, Joanna no longer wishes to see him, but Shayne follows her home to her actual apartment. Once there, he begs her to kill him.

Grady comes there to tell Joanna that he has left home. He hears shouting from her apartment, breaks down her door and finds someone he assumes is Joanna, cowering in terror, not realizing it is actually Shayne in her China Blue disguise. Joanna, now wearing Shayne's clothing, leaps from the shadows and stabs Shayne with the "Superman" vibrator before he can attack Grady with a large pair of scissors. Shayne dies.

Grady addresses to his group therapist about his new relationship with a woman named Joanna.

== Cast ==
- Kathleen Turner as Joanna Crane / China Blue
- Anthony Perkins as "Reverend" Peter Shayne
- John Laughlin as Bobby Grady
- Annie Potts as Amy Grady
- Bruce Davison as Donny Hopper
- Joseph Chapman as Walt Pierson
- Norman Burton as Lou Bateman
- Yvonne McCord as Sheila
- Stephen Lee as Jerry
- Louise Sorel as Claudia
- Rick Wakeman as a photographer at the wedding ceremony

== Production ==
=== Script ===
The film was based on an original script by Barry Sandler. Sandler started writing it in the late 1970s.

I was tapping into what was going on around me during the eighties, it was just at the beginning of the advent of the AIDS crisis… people had difficulties with their relationships, there was a lot of sex going on and it was very easily accessible and a lot of people were using it as kind of an excuse or a defence or a rationale or some way to avoid intimacy, to avoid relationships.

Sandler said he did "about forty drafts" of the script before Ken Russell saw it. It began as a two character piece of China Blue and Shayne, with Shayne masquerading as a psychiatrist, and China Blue as a single woman who was very sexually compulsive. He introduced the Grady character who became more prominent and Joanna became a prostitute.

Sandler had meetings with John Frankenheimer, Bob Rafelson and John Carpenter, as well as Cher, but had trouble getting finance because of the film's content.

=== Ken Russell ===
Sandler's agent suggested he send the film to Russell. "They knew it was a very risky, very daring project", said the writer. "And let's face it, you couldn't get more of a risky and audacious filmmaker than Ken Russell!"

Russell says the script "offered something new in dealing with sex and family life and the masks we accept. It's a powerful subject, and I was quite taken with it, especially when I saw it dealt with these religious hucksters on tv. I know I was obsessed with these terrible preachers."

Russell called it a "film about the exploitation of women, especially at the hands of the macho American male... Americans are asked to live in a world of complete fantasy which they can never live up to."

Although Altered States was a financial success Russell had found difficulty making his next film. One project, Beethoven's Secret was about to start shooting when financing fell apart at the last minute. He was attached to do the film of Evita for over a year, but ultimately left the project when he refused to cast Elaine Paige in the lead. A biopic of Maria Callas with Sophia Loren also failed to get financing. However Russell found himself artistically rejuvenated when offered the chance to direct some opera. He did The Rake's Progress, Soldiers and Butterfly.

Sandler says Russell "was very reluctant to get involved with another American film after the experience he had with (Paddy) Chayefsky on ‘Altered States'. He didn't want to risk losing control. Apparently, he had turned down a lot of projects, but there was something about Crimes that connected with him. We talked about it, we had a great relationship that extended for years up until his death."

With Russell attached, Sandler took the film to New World Pictures. They had a new head of production, Jonathan Axelrod who wanted to move the company "into a more sophisticated area" and they agreed to finance in association with Orion Pictures.

=== Casting ===
Russell had an excellent working relationship with Sandler. Sandler says the biggest change to the script came with the character of Shayne. Originally he was written as a psychiatrist but Anthony Perkins had just played a psychiatrist on Broadway in Equus and did not want to play another psychiatrist. Russell came up with the idea of making him a reverend. "It's a marvelous role", said Perkins, "unlike anything I've ever done."

Kathleen Turner had read the script and wanted to do the film, over the advice of her agent, because she wanted to break away from her image in Romancing the Stone.

Sandler says Jeff Bridges read the script and wanted to do the role of Grady, dropping his price from $3 million to $1 million, but the film could not afford him. Patrick Swayze and Alec Baldwin auditioned but it was decided to go with John Laughlin. "He was this guy plucked out of nowhere, so I think he felt a little uneasy and nervous, but it kind of worked for the character", said Sandler. "He sort of saw that in him and actually pushed his buttons in that direction because he thought it worked for the character, who was very uncomfortable and uneasy and all that."

=== Filming ===
Filming began in April, 1984 at Zoetrope Studios with a mostly non union crew.

Rock musician Rick Wakeman performed the synthesizer-heavy score, the majority of which is made up of melodies directly lifted from Czech composer Antonín Dvořák's "New World Symphony".

Wakeman has an uncredited role in the film as a wedding photographer.

Sandler says Russell "was most intrigued by the China Blue/Shayne scenes. The scenes with Kathleen and Tony. And that kind of high-pitched almost surreal interplay fascinated him, dealing with themes of masks and facades, illusions and deceptions, with these two outrageous characters going at each other. He was less intrigued with the other aspect of the film which was the Grady home life."

Perkins loved working with Russell. "You spend so much of your career working with directors who just don't want to bother listening to your ideas. It's wonderful to find a man like Ken who not only listens but actively encourages you to come up with your thoughts."

Turner says she felt "really good" about the film "because I feel that was really brave, and I was risking a lot there – in an acting sense. I was satisfied with that. I think that's some of my best work. I don't think the film is as good as it could have been, but I'm very proud of my work in it. Ken made me brave. Ken Russell. And my agent was encouraging. Plus I was feeling a little rebellious around that time. I saw public popularity as a kind of entrapment, and I wanted some danger. I didn't want to get trapped in fulfilling people's conceptions of me over and over again. I felt pressure and I wanted to break out."

Turner wrote in her memoirs that shooting was made difficult by Perkins' drug problem and Russell's heavy drinking.

=== Russell marriage ===
At the film's wrap party aboard the Queen Mary on Long Beach, Russell married his longtime companion, Vivian Jolly. The ceremony was officiated by Anthony Perkins, who was an ordained minister with the Universal Life Church. Perkins said Russell was the one who suggested it. "I thought he was kidding", said Perkins. "But then it turned out he'd done some research and discovered that if we paid $25 I could become a member of the Universal Life Church and would be eligible to marry them."

"It's an extraordinary film", said Perkins. "And it will jolt people. Even now that it's trimmed, I expect it will offend some people. Ken Russell's films usually do. But it's adventurous filmmaking of the best kind. And that's what people want, isn't it? Too often recently, delicate subjects have been tackled so timidly that they've found no audience at all. I'm glad it's turned out to be controversial. People will either love it or hate it. And that's what you need if you want people to come and see your film today. Even raves from the critics no longer guarantee you an audience. A film has to be talked about. And this one will be."

== Rating controversy ==
Crimes of Passion was initially given an 'X' rating by the MPAA. Russell, hoping for an 'R' rating, re-cut and re-submitted the film, but was unsuccessful. New World Pictures refused to release the film unless it was rated 'R', so Russell was asked to cut it a third time. "I just don't see an end to it", said Russell. "All we have left is two children drinking orange juice at breakfast."

Sandler said, "In the purest sense, it's justified – you can do anything you want to in your movie, as long as you're willing to go with an 'X' rating. Then you have to face the fact that no distributor wants an 'X'. Or that you won't be able to get advertising in many newspapers. Or that you won't be able to get air time on most TV and radio stations. Some time in the last 10 years, an 'X' rating became an automatic stamp of pornography."

Sandler says the ratings board contacted him and suggested they release the film as an 'X' and reclaim that rating. "Because we had Ken Russell and Kathleen Turner and Tony in a legitimate film, they thought we could re-legitimise the 'X' rating. But the studio didn't want to hear it, so they made us cut the film."

Russell stated that further cuts "would do the film I was commissioned to do irreparable harm. The only thing one can do is make a stand and avoid being steamrolled. Even if you're squashed flat, it's better than conning the public with something you don't believe in."

Robert Rehme, head of New World Pictures, admitted further cuts "probably would hurt the picture", but felt it would not affect its box office fortunes. Once Russell heard the changes New World were going to make regardless, he agreed to make further cuts and the film got an 'R'.

Sandler said, "We kept cutting a little more each time and, by the fifth round of cuts, I think they were all so beaten down from looking at the thing and from pressure from the press and elsewhere that they finally went with an 'R'."

Russell said the cuts he did were of "a sex shadow show on a wall and a rather climactic sado-masochistic scene, also a scene where China Blue cracks, and several scenes of erotic art that are her mental reactions to what's happening to her. I would think the film in its present form loses some of the motivations. Some of what China Blue does must now seem arbitrary."

A scene that was cut in its entirety was one where Turner takes a police officer home and involves the use of a nightstick. Sandler says when the film was previewed "people were intensely upset by that scene... It was clear that, had we kept it in, it would have made a lot of people extremely uncomfortable."

Brian De Palma said he thought the film "was affected deeply by the cuts that were made in it. You're dealing with a major film artist here. You're not dealing with some guy shooting pornography in a back room somewhere."

An unrated video version was released with an extra 1½ minutes, which sold twice as many copies as the theatrical version.

== Reception ==
=== Critical ===
As of October 2026, Crimes of Passion holds a rating of 54% on Rotten Tomatoes based on 28 reviews. The consensus summarizes: "Ken Russell and his cast are definitely committed to Crimes of Passion, but whether this sexually charged thriller is worthy of the audience's convictions is altogether more uncertain."

Janet Maslin of The New York Times said "Ken Russell's films have never lacked exuberance or humor, which makes the flat, joyless tone of Crimes of Passion a surprise. Much of this is attributable to a screenplay... filled with smutty double-entendres and weighty ironies. Only intermittently does Mr. Russell break through with the kind of manic flamboyance that is so singularly and rudely his own."

Perkins later said "there are great moments in that film that could only come from a genius. He was on to something about the nature of religion and evil that few people could ever find. Yet, it was, in the end, a bit of a disappointment because it had no plot. . . no story. The images were great, but there was nothing to hang them on."

=== Box office ===
The film was a minor success in theatres. However, it was successful on video, making over $4 million.

== Lawsuit ==
In 1986 Russell went to court against New World seeking more than $1 million in damages. He said he had an agreement to direct the film for $578,514 and 20 per cent of the profits. He was paid $68,514 during the production and for the company to retain $500,000 as Russell's investment in the picture. Russell received a payout but said after the lawyers and his agent took a cut "it wasn't worth the aggro".
