= Joseph Chapman (actor) =

American film and television actor

- Occupations: Film and television actor
- Years active: 1976–1999

Joseph Chapman is an American film and television actor. He is known for playing the villainous character Mark St. Claire in the American soap opera television series Knots Landing.

== Career ==
Chapman guest-starred in television programs including Airwolf, Riptide and Hill Street Blues. He also appeared in the 1984 film Crimes of Passion. Chapman starred in the television miniseries Favorite Son. His final credit was from the medical drama television series Providence.

== Filmography ==
=== Film ===
Year	Title	Role	Notes
1980	The Happy Hooker Goes Hollywood	Miles	
1984	Crimes of Passion	Walt Pierson	
1988	Mac and Me	Doctor	
1990	Ghost Dad	Additional voices	
1994	The Crow	Additional voices	
1996	Lifeform	Edwards AFB	Voice

=== Television ===
Year	Title	Role	Notes
1976, 1977	Barnaby Jones	Peter / Intern	2 episodes
1977	Wonder Woman	Radioman	Episode: "The Bermuda Triangle Crisis"
1979	Charleston	Bank Teller	Television film
1981	The Greatest American Hero	Tim Carson	Episode: "My Heroes Have Always Been Cowboys"
1981	Computercide	Lab Operator	Television film
1981	Jacqueline Bouvier Kennedy	John Husted	Television film
1981	Judgment Day	Bob Simmons	Television film
1982	Bret Maverick	Jasper Weems	Episode: "The Not So Magnificent Six"
1982	Quincy, M.E.	Court Clerk	Episode: "Expert in Murder"
1982	Not Just Another Affair	Norm	Television film
1982	Hill Street Blues	Freed	Episode: "Little Boil Blue"
1983	Remington Steele	Reporter #3	Episode: "Vintage Steele"
1983–1984	Knots Landing	Mark St. Claire	14 episodes
1984	Scarecrow and Mrs. King	Ralph	Episode: "Savior"
1984	Attack on Fear	Agent	Television film
1984	Airwolf	Carter Anderson III	Episode: "The Hunted"
1985	Lots of Luck	Mr. Ardle	Television film
1985	Riptide	Bradley Stivers	Episode: "Boz Busters"
1985	Dynasty	Beaumont	Episode: "The Gown"
1985, 1986	Highway to Heaven	Announcer / Doctor #1	2 episodes
1985–1986	Cagney & Lacey	Various roles	3 episodes
1986	The Magical World of Disney	Kaiser	Episode: "Help Wanted: Kids"
1986	Killer in the Mirror	Ben	Television film
1986	Hunter	Patrick Green	Episode: "Overnight Sensation"
1986	You Again?	Mr. Beals	Episode: "Quit Is a Four Letter Word"
1986	Webster	Frank Curtis	2 episodes
1987	Sister Margaret and the Saturday Night Ladies	Brad Dunn	Television film
1987	Billionaire Boys Club	Henley	Television film
1988	Simon & Simon	Ziegler	Episode: "Baja, Humbug"
1988	Favorite Son	Rodgers	3 episodes
1989	Mr. Belvedere	Dr. Dave	Episode: "Anchors Away"
1990	Thirtysomething	Shadow #1	Episode: "Samurai Ad Man"
1991	Never Forget	Reporter	Television film
1991	Columbo	Prosecutor	Episode: "Columbo and the Murder of a Rock Star"
1992	Step by Step	Jim	Episode: "He Wanted Wings"
1992	Bodies of Evidence	Attorney Howell	Episode: "The Edge"
1993	The Fresh Prince of Bel-Air	Maurice	Episode: "The Baby Comes Out"
1993	A Walton Thanksgiving Reunion	Newsman	Television film
1996	Lois & Clark: The New Adventures of Superman	Bank V.P.	Episode: "Seconds"
1996	Suddenly Susan	Dr. Ethan Sanders	Episode: "Was It Something I Said?"
1999	Providence	Man	Episode: "Blind Faith"
