= Paul Popowich =

Canadian actor

- Born: March 2, 1973 (age 53); Hamilton, Ontario, Canada
- Occupation: Actor
- Years active: 1988–present

Paul Popowich is a Canadian actor. He is best known for his portrayal of Mr. Smith, an angel who helps people change their pasts, in season two of Twice in a Lifetime. Popowich has performed in many television series, including Beverly Hills, 90210, and features and theatre.

== Career ==
Popowich made his film debut aged 15 when he received his first professional role as Cass in the movie Tommy Tricker and the Stamp Traveller.

He also starred as drummer Jesse on the Canadian television show Catwalk, about a struggling band of musicians, and as Joe Hardy in the 1995 The Hardy Boys television series.

He appeared in the Star Trek: Deep Space Nine episode "Valiant", as Tim Watters, a Starfleet cadet who received a field promotion to captain.

In 2012, he appeared in Season 12 of Degrassi: The Next Generation as Clare Edwards' boss, Asher Shostak. In addition, Popowich has worked on projects including Angela's Eyes (2006), I Me Wed (2007), The Bridge (2010), Cracked (2010), and Hemlock Grove (2013).

In December 2018, Popowich portrayed Canadian detective Tom Barrow in an episode of Investigation Discovery's The Case That Haunts Me titled "Devil's Triangle".

== Filmography ==
=== Film ===
Year	Title	Role	Notes
1988	Tommy Tricker and the Stamp Traveller	Cass	
1994	The Club	Greg	
1999	Children of the Corn 666: Isaac's Return	Gabriel	
2003	Vlad	Jeff Meyer / Husband	
2003	Silver Man	Silver Man	
2003	Vampires Anonymous	Vic Weller	
2004	Phil the Alien	Rob	
2015	Let's Rap	Dean Bradley	
2016	Rupture	Cliff	
2018	Blindsided	Dr. David Carter	

=== Television ===
Year	Title	Role	Notes
1991	The Hidden Room	Jimmy	Episode: "To the Orchards"
1992–1995	Catwalk	Jesse Carlson	48 episodes
1995	Kung Fu: The Legend Continues	Leon	Episode: "May I Walk with You"
1995	The Hardy Boys	Joe Hardy	13 episodes
1995	Ready or Not	Wright	Episode: "Sweet Thirteen"
1997	Flash Forward	Climbing instructor	Episode: "Speechless"
1997	Any Mother's Son	Allen	Television film
1997	F/X: The Series	Jeffrey	Episode: "Siege"
1998	Beverly Hills, 90210	Jasper McQuade	6 episodes
1998	Star Trek: Deep Space Nine	Tim Watters	Episode: "Valiant"
1998	Unhappily Ever After	Jerome	Episode: "A Movie Show"
1998	Nash Bridges	Grant	Episode: "Swingers"
1999	Promised Land	Keith	3 episodes
1999	Pirates of Silicon Valley	Jones	Television film
2000	Dark Angel	Darren McKennon	Episode: "Pilot"
2000–2001	Twice in a Lifetime	Mr. Smith	22 episodes
2001	The Outer Limits	Tom Palmer	Episode: "Time to Time"
2002	Mutant X	Mark Griffin	Episode: "Presumed Guilty"
2005	Beautiful People	Kevin Strong	3 episodes
2005	This Is Wonderland	Chris Brewer	Episode #3.1
2006	The L Word	Josh Becker	Episodes "Lifeline" and "Lone Star"
2006	Angela's Eyes	Jerry Anderson	7 episodes
2006	Fatal Trust	Tom	Television film
2007	The Roommate	Petw	Television film
2007	The Best Years	Mick Templeton	Episode: "Cruising"
2007	I Me Wed	Colin	Television film
2007	Love You to Death	Lance Stevens	Episode: "Murder Mystery Weekend"
2008	Long Island Confidential	Billy	Television film
2010	When Love Is Not Enough: The Lois Wilson Story	Rogers Burnham	Television film
2010	The Bridge	Tommy Dunn	12 episodes
2012	Degrassi: The Next Generation	Asher Shostak	6 episodes
2012	Flashpoint	Jake	2 episodes
2013	Cracked	Dr. Sean McCray	8 episodes
2013	Hemlock Grove	JR Godfrey	4 episodes
2014	My Daughter Must Live	Hugh O'Malley	Television film
2014	The Good Witch's Wonder	Grant	Television film
2014	One Starry Christmas	Adam	Television film
2015	Haven	Tony	2 episodes
2016	The Expanse	Darren	Episode: "Critical Mass"
2016	Rogue	Neil Stopler	2 episodes
2016	Private Eyes	Jeremy	Episode: "Partners in Crime"
2017	Mommy's Little Boy	Michael Davis	Television film
2017	Saving Hope	Luke Harris	Episode: "Hope Never Dies"
2017	Acceptable Risk	Lee Manning	6 episodes
2018	The Detectives	Tom Barrow	Episode: "Home"
2019	Terrified at 17	Jeffery Price	Television film
2021	Mayor of Kingstown	Agent Hastings	2 episodes
2023	The Spencer Sisters	Billy West	4 episodes
2025	Motorheads	Sheriff Hugo	6 episodes
