= Cherryvale Mall =

CherryVale Mall

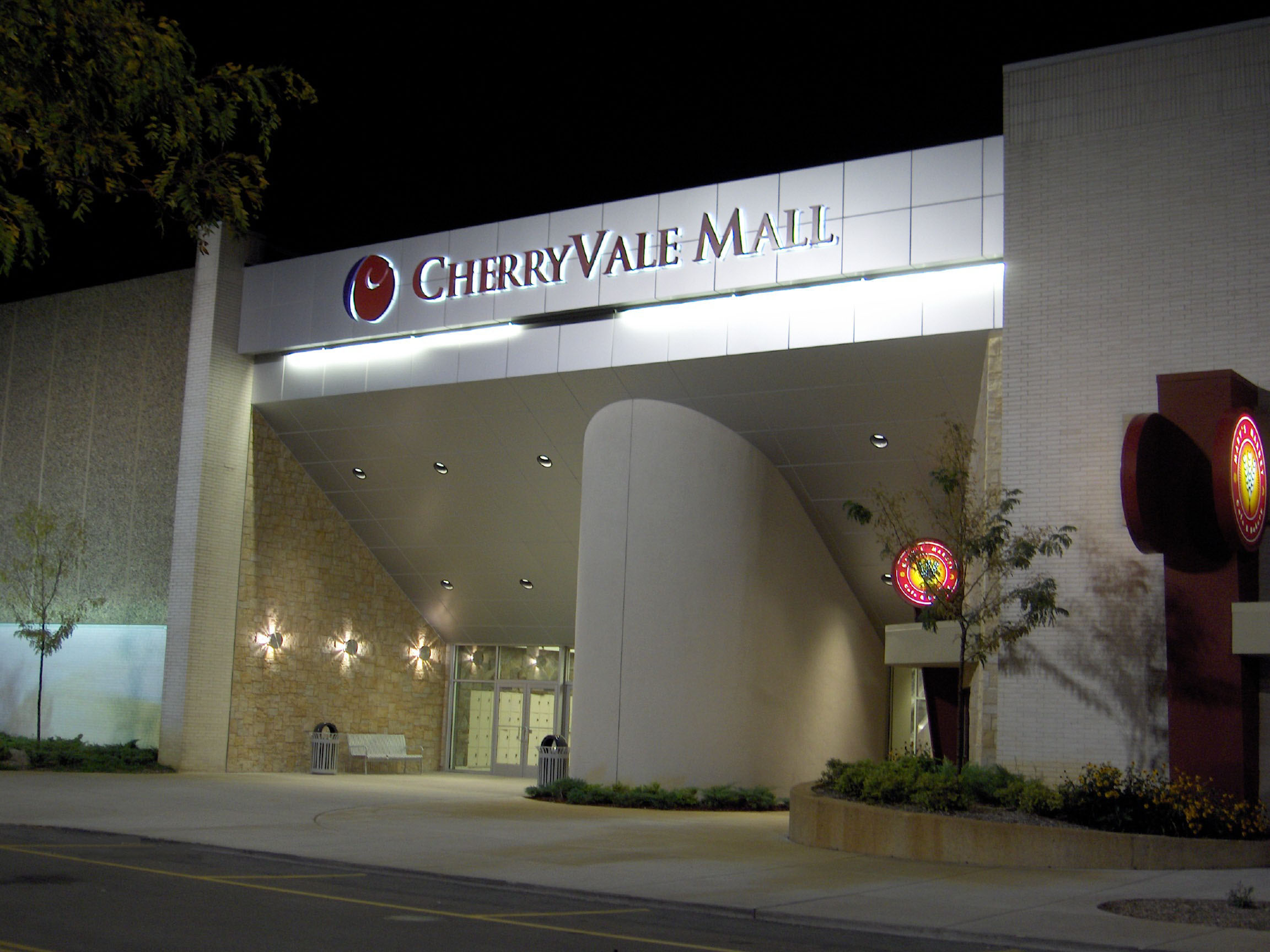
- The southwest entrance to CherryVale Mall, as seen in an image taken in 2006.
- Location: 7200 Harrison Avenue; Rockford, Illinois, United States 61112
- Coordinates: 42°14′45″N 88°58′32.6″W
- Opened: October 1, 1973
- Developer: Jacobs Visconsi & Jacobs
- Manager: CBL & Associates Properties Inc.
- Owner: CBL & Associates Properties Inc.
- Num. of stores: 140
- Num. of anchor tenants: 6 (5 open, 1 vacant)
- Floor area: 850,253 sq ft (78,991.1 m^{2})
- Floors: 2 (3 in Macy's, 1 in JCPenney, Home Trends Furniture, and Barnes & Noble)
- Public transit: Rockford Mass Transit District
- Website: www.shopcherryvalemall.com

CherryVale Mall (originally The Mall at CherryVale) is a shopping mall in Rockford, Illinois, along its border with Cherry Valley. Located at the intersection of US 20, Interstate 39, and Interstate 90, the two-story mall is the largest shopping mall in northern Illinois outside of suburban Chicago.

Along with being the largest mall in the region, CherryVale is notable for being the first mall in Rockford designed as a fully enclosed shopping center along with the opening of the first Marshall Field's department store in Illinois outside of the Chicago region. Developed by the Richard E. Jacobs Group, the mall is currently owned by CBL & Associates Properties, who acquired it in 2001. The mall's anchor tenants are JCPenney, Macy's, Tilt Studio/Tilted 10, Home Trends Furniture & Mattress, and Barnes & Noble. There is a vacant anchor space last occupied by Bergner's.

== History ==
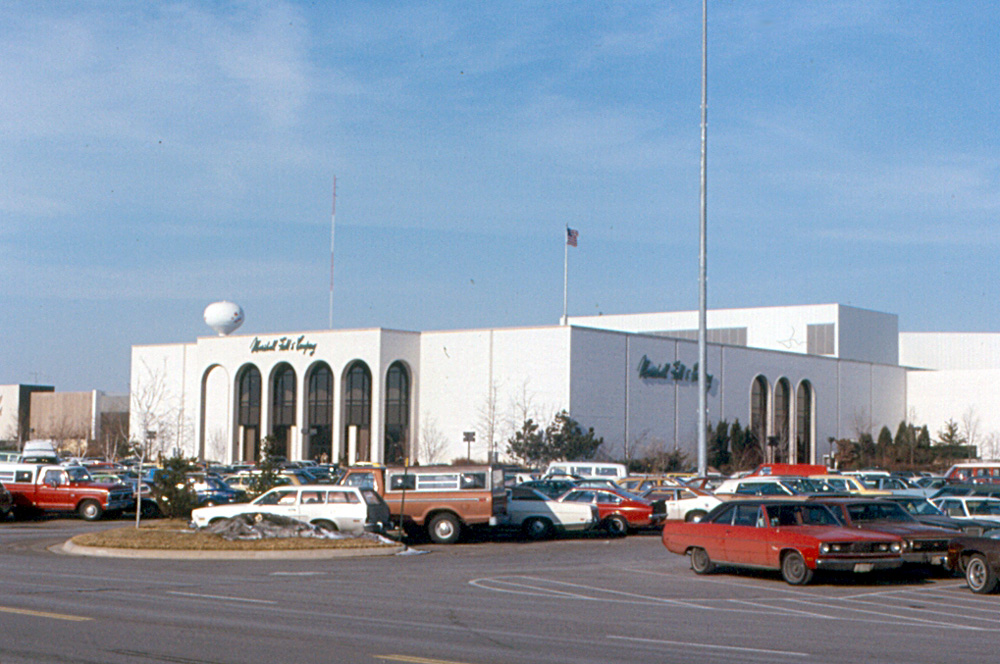
South parking lot in 1976. Marshall Field's was replaced by Macy's in 2006, using nearly identical store exterior.

The Mall at CherryVale opened in the fall of 1973 with a two-story Sears (opened September 26) and a 3-story Marshall Field's (opened October 1; one of the first stores outside the Chicago metropolitan area). Alongside Sears and Marshall Field's, the mall opened with 23 additional stores, including Lane Bryant, Kroch's & Brentano's Booksellers, Casual Corner, Chess King and Disc Records. Within a year of its opening, H.C. Prange opened as the mall's third anchor store, alongside Prange Way discount store.

Located nearly 6 miles from the city center of Rockford, the 233-acre mall was located at the intersection of the US 20 bypass and the Northwest Tollway (Interstate 90); although not located near housing, the mall also intersected several major surface streets, connecting it to the eastern half of Rockford. Although not the first enclosed mall in the Rockford region (North Towne Mall and Colonial Village were constructed in 1956 and 1962, respectively), CherryVale was the first designed to be fully enclosed.

In 1975, the mall opened the first of two theater complexes, with a free-standing 3-screen complex northeast of the mall (next to the Sears parking lot). In 1983, a four-screen theater opened in the lower floor of the mall between Prange's and Prange Way.

By the beginning of the 1980s, the mall officially took on the shorter name "CherryVale Mall". Following the growth of the mall, several businesses had begun to use the outlots surrounding the mall, including an automobile dealership, gas station, bank, jewelry shop, bowling alley, toy store, and water park.

In 1989, following the closure of the Prange Way sub-anchor store, the entire mall underwent its first major renovation. The Prange Way space on the lower floor was converted into a food court with a Sbarro and Quencher's Smoothies, as well as the addition of a main entrance on the north side of the upper floor. From 1992 to 1996, the mall would change one of its anchors, twice. In 1992, HC Prange was acquired by Iowa-based Younkers, remaining a department store; at the end of 1996, following its acquisition, Younkers closed its Cherryvale store (replaced by a Bergner's, eventually closing both its other Rockford locations)

After years of struggling against much larger multiplexes in the region, the mall would close both of its movie theaters, with the freestanding movie theater closed in 1999; the lower-level movie theater was closed in 2000. The lower-level movie theater was remodeled into retail space shortly after its closure, although the freestanding movie theater would remain vacant for nearly 15 years, before becoming remodeled.

In 2001, the mall was acquired by its current owners, CBL & Associates Properties. Shortly after the acquisition of the mall, Rockford and Cherry Valley underwent a street expansion project around the mall, connecting two major streets together. Shortly after, additional commercial development began, including a grocery store, several restaurants, and a convenience store.

As the new owners, during 2004, CBL gave CherryVale Mall its second major renovation, including the most extensive changes to its exterior since 1973. To increase space in the center court of the mall, the two inclined moving walkways were removed in favor of a glass elevator. At the expense of removing the main entrance, CBL added JCPenney as a fourth anchor store on the top floor, expanding retail space to 806,900 square feet. The food court was also renovated, with the chairs and tables being replaced with new ones, new lighting, and new floor tiles. New pillars were also added. Unlike the previous pillars, these were square and made out of bricks.

In September 2006, the Marshall Field's location at the mall was rebranded to Macy's (as part of the former company's acquisition by the latter).

In December 2006, Derrick Shareef was arrested for one count of attempting to damage or destroy CherryVale Mall. Shareef attempted to sell stereo speakers for hand grenades and a handgun. He planned to detonate hand grenades throughout the mall and use the handgun to disrupt Christmas shoppers. Shareef was a member of the Nation of Islam and had originally planned to attack a federal judge. In 2008, he was sentenced to 35 years in prison. He is currently incarcerated at FCI Greenville.

In 2007, CBL began expansion of a "lifestyle" component, intended to attract middle to upper-class shoppers. Featuring Barnes & Noble as an anchor (replacing the long-defunct Kroch's and Brentano's as the largest bookstore in the mall), the 75,000 square foot addition was built in the parking lot sandwiched between Bergner's and Macy's.

In 2015, the mall became part of the Tesla Supercharger network, adding 6 Superchargers to a lower-level parking lot.

On April 18, 2018, it was announced that the Bergner's store would be closing as its parent company, The Bon-Ton Stores was going out of business. The store closed on August 29, 2018. The lower level of the store was replaced shortly after by a Choice Furniture store, while the upper level of the former Bergner's store remained vacant.

On December 28, 2018, it was announced that Sears would be closing as part of a plan to close 80 stores nationwide. The store closed in March 2019. In May 2019, Nickels And Dimes Inc. of Celina, Texas announced that Tilt Studio and a new concept, Tilted 10 would open up in the former Sears space. The two-story arcade opened in the summer of 2020.

In 2020, the Choice Furniture store closed, and was replaced by Galleria Furniture in 2021. Galleria Furniture ultimately ended up closing in 2024, and ended up being replaced by yet another furniture store, Home Trends Furniture & Mattress shortly after.

== Stores ==
As of January 2018, CherryVale Mall has 140 stores on 850,253 square feet.

=== Current Anchor Stores ===
- JCPenney (2004–present)
- Macy's (2006–present)
- Barnes & Noble (2007–present)
- Tilt Studio/Tilted 10 (2020–present)
- Home Trends Furniture & Mattress (2024–present)

=== Former Anchor Stores ===
- Sears (1973–2019; closed down as part of 80 store closures nationwide, replaced by Tilt Studio/Tilted 10 in 2020)
- Marshall Field's (1973–2006; rebranded to Macy's)
- H.C. Prange (1974–1992; acquired by Younkers)
- Prange Way (1974–1989; chain closed, location replaced by mall food court)
- Younkers (1992-1996; replaced by Bergner's)
- Bergner's (1997–2018; lower level replaced by Choice Furniture)
- Choice Furniture (2018–2020; replaced by Galleria Furniture)
- Galleria Furniture (2021–2024; replaced by Home Trends Furniture & Mattress)

== See also ==
- Woodfield Mall - largest shopping mall in Illinois
- Machesney Park Mall - former shopping mall in the Rockford area
