= Steve Sohmer =

American writer and media executive

Steve Sohmer (born June 26, 1941, in Savannah, Georgia) is an American author, former network television and motion picture studio executive, television writer and producer, and Shakespearean scholar.

In 1966, his first novel, The Way It Was was published by Robert Gottlieb of Simon & Schuster. The book received positive reviews and was chosen by The New York Times as one of the twenty best novels of the year. In 1967, Sohmer was named creative director of the Bureau of Advertising of the American Newspaper Publishers Association.

In 1972, Sohmer left the Bureau to establish his own media promotion firm in partnership with The Minneapolis Star and Tribune Company. For the next five years the New York-based company created slide and film sales presentations for media clients.

In 1977, Sohmer was named vice president, Marketing and Promotion, of the CBS Television Network. Sohmer supervised the marketing of CBS Entertainment, CBS News and CBS Sports. Sohmer's promotion launched Dallas, The Dukes of Hazzard, The Incredible Hulk, Alice, and other long-running hits. His movie marketing campaigns brought viewers to Skokie, Playing for Time and Fallen Angel.

In 1982, Sohmer moved to NBC Television as executive vice president in charge of marketing and promotion, Saturday morning programming, specials and daytime television. Sohmer launched hit series including Cheers, Family Ties, The A-Team and Remington Steele.

Sohmer was named president and CEO of Columbia Pictures in 1985, but left the following year.

He was executive vice president at PAX TV and ABC Television. He created and served as writer-producer for the miniseries Favorite Son and the award-winning drama series Mancuso, F.B.I. starring Robert Loggia, both for NBC based on Sohmer's novel of the same title. Sohmer also wrote and produced a miniseries adaptation of Tom Clancy's OP Center (1995) for NBC and created the drama series Twice in a Lifetime for PAX TV (1999).

In 1995, Sohmer earned a doctorate from Oxford University, specializing in Shakespeare studies. Since graduation, Sohmer has published in peer-reviewed journals as well as these scholarly books: Shakespeare's Mystery Play, Shakespeare for the Wiser Sort, and Reading Shakespeare's Mind, all from Manchester University Press.

Sohmer was married to soap opera star Deidre Hall for 15 years. They are divorced.
