= Derrick Shareef =

American terrorist

Derrick Shareef, also known as Talib Abu Salam Ibn Shareef, is a convicted Islamic terrorist who was charged with trying to trade stereo speakers for hand grenades and a handgun as part of plan to terrorize shoppers at CherryVale Mall in Rockford, Illinois. Last known to reside in Genoa, Illinois, Shareef was arrested by FBI agents in Rockford on 6 December 2006. Shareef was charged with one count of attempting to damage or destroy a building by fire or explosion and one count of attempting to use a weapon of mass destruction. He faces a maximum sentence of life in prison on the latter charge.

Shareef was born in 1984 to mother Margaret Ann "Marie" Dunn and was raised mostly in Georgia, before moving to Illinois with his family. He was raised alongside one older brother, Marvin Dunn, and one younger sister, Christina Shareef.

Shareef, a convert to the Nation of Islam, was steered by an undercover informant from wanting to "smoke a judge" to a more public plan to "disrupt Christmas."

On November 28, 2007, Shareef pleaded guilty to a specific charge of planning to use weapons of mass destruction against persons and property. Although he pleaded guilty, Shareef said he hadn't intended to hurt anyone and was "coerced into doing things and trapped into doing things." Federal investigators have not alleged Shareef had anything to do with any prominent terrorist group. Shareef faced 30 years to life in prison when he was to be sentenced March 14, 2008.

Shareef was sentenced to 35 years in prison on September 30, 2008 by U.S. District Judge David Coar. Coar said he did not believe Shareef was evil, but said a substantial sentence was necessary given the gravity of what was planned and to protect the public. Shareef is currently serving his sentence at FCI Milan.
