= Albuquerque Bridge =

Bridge in Sasebo, Japan

Albuquerque Bridge アルバカーキ橋
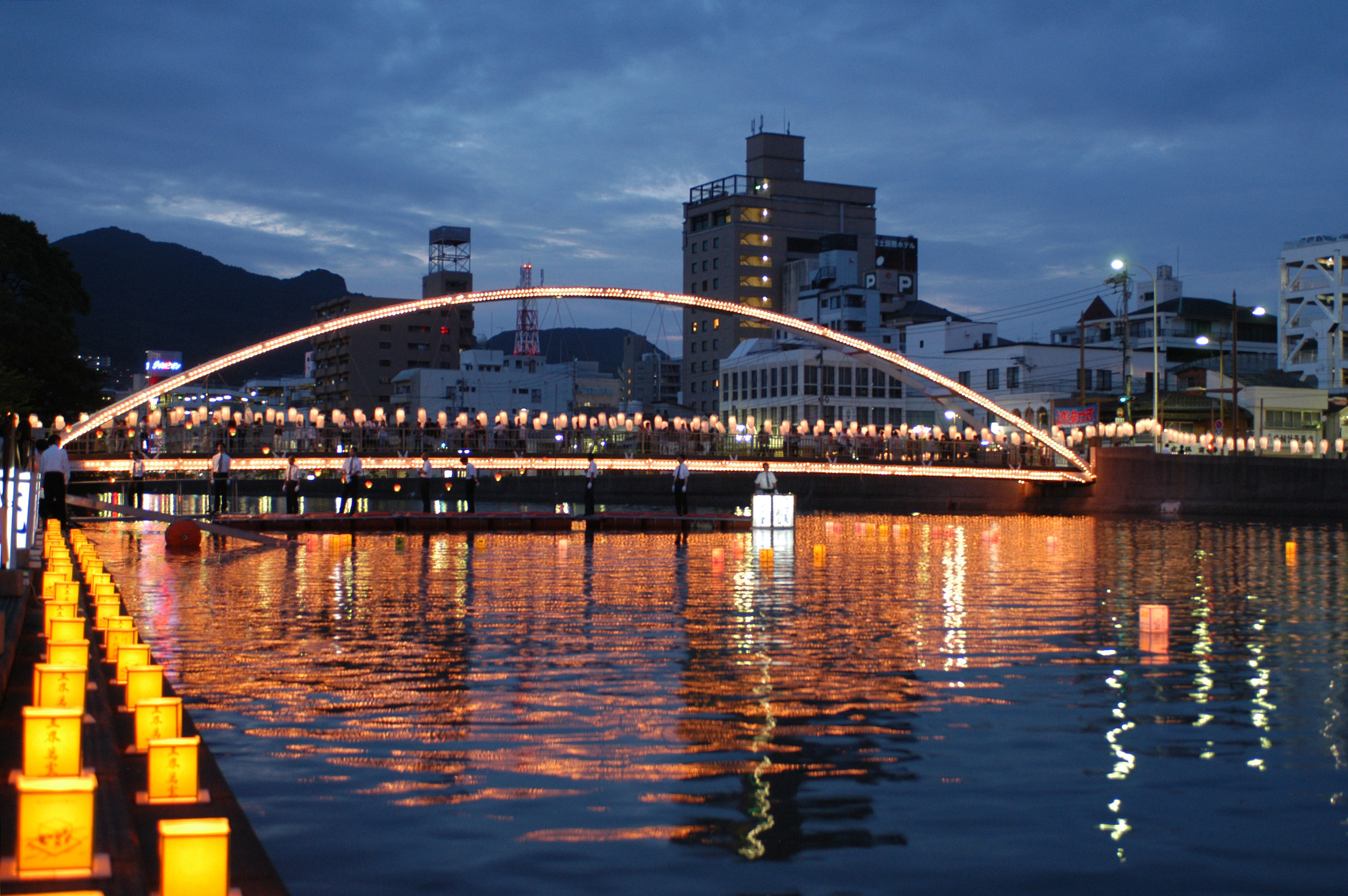
- Albuquerque Bridge during the Obon Festival
- Coordinates: 33°10′17.6″N 129°43′5.2″E
- Crosses: Sasebo River
- Locale: Sasebo, Nagasaki Prefecture
- Begins: Urban Sasebo
- Ends: Sasebo City Park and Nimitz Park
- Named for: Albuquerque, New Mexico
- Owner: Sasebo City
- Website: pref.nagasaki.jp/bunrui/machidukuri/toshikeikaku-kokudoriyo/keikan/471154.html

Location
- Interactive map of Albuquerque Bridge

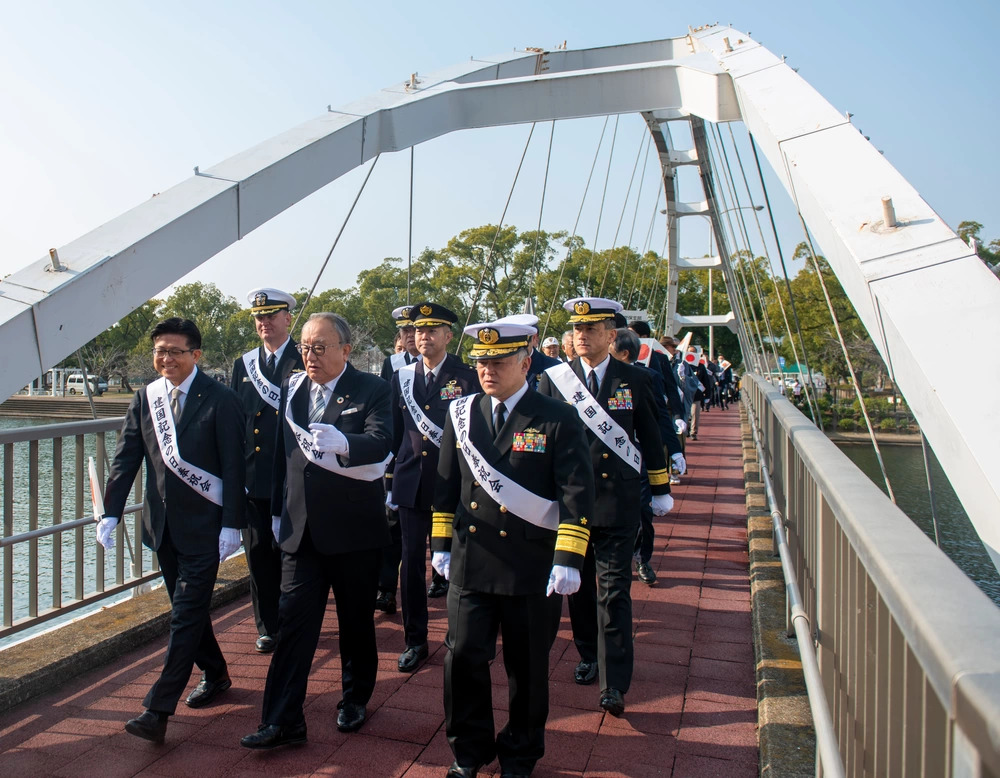
Foundation Day celebration in 2024

Albuquerque Bridge is a bridge located in Sasebo City, Nagasaki Prefecture, Japan. It is named after Albuquerque, New Mexico, a sister city of Sasebo. The bridge connects Urban Sasebo to Sasebo City Park and Nimitz Park, the latter of which is owned by the United Service Organisations (USO), a charitable organisation which provides entertainment and contact to their family for the US military.

== Etymology ==
Albuquerque Bridge was named on November 1, 1966, the same day Albuquerque and Sasebo became sister cities. It was named this way to symbolise a friendship between the two cities, as well as Japan and the United States.
