= Twice in a Lifetime (TV series) =

Canadian TV series (1999–2001)

- Season 2 stars Paul Popowich (left) and Al Waxman
- Genre: Drama; Mystery
- Created by: Steve Sohmer
- Written by: Randy Brown; Liz Coe; Star Frohman; Babs Greyhosky; Jim Kramer; Neil Landau; Suzanne Marcus Levine; Pamela K. Long; Mike Scott; Steve Sohmer; Marcy Vosburgh; Robert Wolterstorff
- Directed by: Graeme Campbell; Holly Dale; Steve DiMarco; Alan Goluboff; Manfred Guthe; Allan King; Eleanor Lindo; Graeme Lynch; David Winning
- Starring: Al Waxman; Gordie Brown; Paul Popowich
- Theme music composer: Glenn Morley
- Composers: Marvin Dolgay; Glenn Morley
- Country of origin: Canada
- Original language: English
- No. of seasons: 2
- No. of episodes: 44

Production
- Executive producers: Stephen J. Brackley (2000-2001); Pamela K. Long (2000-2001); Michael Prupas (1999-2000); Barney Rosenzweig (1999-2000)
- Producers: Paul Leishman; Deborah Nathan; Michael J. Maschio; Paula Smith; Marilyn Stonehouse
- Cinematography: Manfred Guthe; Maris H. Jansons; Harald Ortenburger
- Editors: Jean Coulombe; Eric Goddard; Rob MacKinnon; Brett Sullivan
- Running time: 60 minutes
- Production companies: Pebblehut Productions; Paxson Entertainment; CTV

Original release
- Network: CTV
- Release: August 25, 1999 – May 30, 2001

Twice in a Lifetime is a Canadian mystery drama television series that originally aired from 1999 to 2001. Created by Steve Sohmer, the series aired on CTV in Canada and PAX in the United States.

== Plot ==
The series follows an aspiring angel who for some reason, will not enter heaven, but is assigned to guide someone who has died prematurely. The prematurely deceased, played by the episode guest stars, may choose from the afterlife to correct something that went wrong earlier in their life. The key concept to the series was that each episode featured a different guest star in the leading role, while the series regulars played a supporting role.

Episodes are centered on an individual who had reached the end of their life in one timeline, and due to circumstances seen by their advocate and judge, is then given 3 days to travel into their past, and without revealing their true identity, convince their younger self to make a different choice at a pivotal point to effect a different outcome for example, by quitting smoking, or choosing a different job and in changing this learn a key lesson to make them become a better person. This way, the series was an anthology of many different arenas and characters.

Season One featured Gordie Brown as advocate Mr. Jones, and Paul Popowich played the role of advocate Mr. Smith in Season Two. Al Waxman played Judge Othniel in 40 of the 44 episodes. In Season One he appeared as Judge Jephtah in two episodes and Polly Bergen played Judge Deborah in two episodes. Waxman died in heart surgery on January 18, 2001, while the second season was airing.

== Cast ==
=== Main ===
- Al Waxman: Judge Othniel/Judge Jepthah
- Gordie Brown: Mr. Jones (season 1)
- Paul Popowich: Mr. Smith (season 2)

=== Recurring ===
- Polly Bergen: Judge Deborah (season 1)
- Diahann Carroll: Jael, a lawyer (season 1)

== Production ==
=== Crew ===
Ten episodes were directed by sci-fi veteran David Winning; including "The Trouble with Harry" (Jere Burns, Brent Carver), "Moonshine Over Harlem" (Earle Hyman) and "It's a Hard Knock Life" (Markie Post). Veteran television producer Barney Rosenzweig (Charlie's Angels, Cagney & Lacey) oversaw the first season of the series.

=== Writing ===
- The scenario of this series always takes place in four stages: the accidental death of a person, their judgment, their second chance in the past and the happy ending.
- In the premiere episode of season 2, Mr. Jones is replaced by Mr. Smith, a mystery man with no ID pulled out of a burning church by a firefighter. He dies in the firefighter's arms. His death seems to make him lose his memory. Jones is as much an expert as Smith is a clumsy beginner. Note that in the second season, the passage to the afterlife is different from season 1. Also Mr Smith seems to be trying to remember who he is and complete his job as a guide/defense attorney and helper to the souls he picks up so he can either get his life back or become an angel. It's never made clear and we never find out what his whole story is.
- In two episodes of the first season, we see Judge Deborah, played by Polly Bergen, and Prosecutor Jael, played by Diahann Carroll.

== Episodes ==
=== Season 1: 1999–2000 ===
No. overall	No. in season	Title	Original release date
1	1	"Sixteen Candles"	August 25, 1999
A woman who dies in a fire while drinking is given the chance to prevent her addiction. Guest star: Gwynyth Walsh
2	2	"Death and Taxes"	September 1, 1999
When his son vanishes on a camping trip, a cold-hearted IRS agent is killed looking for him. He's given the chance to convince his younger self not to be so harsh with others. But when he returns, he finds his son still goes missing and worries things didn't change for the best. Guest stars: Corbin Bernsen and Michael Seater
3	3	"Healing Touch"	September 8, 1999
An ambitious doctor, who actually cut her own husband's medical career short to get ahead, is given a chance to sway her younger self from this selfish path. Her journey is complicated by how her future husband is attracted to her "new" self. Guest stars: Jonelle Allen and Maurice Dean Wint
4	4	"Ashes to Ashes"	September 15, 1999
A chain smoker dying of lung cancer is killed in a car accident. She's sent back as a guidance counselor to get her younger self to stop but discovers a shocking family secret that drove her to this path. Guest star: Stephanie Zimbalist
5	5	"Double Exposure"	September 22, 1999
A woman who listened to her mother's advice lives a cold and empty life with a cheating husband before dying in a park. She's given the chance to convince her younger self to follow her dreams of being a photographer. Guest stars: Kate Jackson and Richard Eden
6	6	"The Blame Game"	September 29, 1999
Feeling bitter toward his aged mother for never letting him go to college, a Vietnam veteran is given the chance to convince his younger self to follow his dreams and learns more of his mother's true motives. Guest stars: Ron Glass and Michael Cera; Polly Bergen filled in for Al Waxman
7	7	"Blood Brothers"	October 13, 1999
A former baseball pitcher is wallowing in guilt over sending his brother to prison when they were teenagers. When the brother gets out, he kills the pitcher, who is given a chance to stop his brother's path to crime... but time is running out before the key event happens. Guest stars: Joe Penny, Brooke Nevin, and Kevin Zegers; Polly Bergen filled in for Al Waxman
8	8	"School's Out"	October 27, 1999
A retiring teacher, hated for her cold ways with students, is killed in a robbery. She is sent back to convince her younger self to give a second chance to a promising athlete. Guest stars: Roberta Maxwell and Cedric Smith
9	9	"O'er the Ramparts We Watched"	November 3, 1999
After being killed in a robbery, a woman is ready to be accepted into heaven but instead argues that she be sent back to try to save a former love. But her attempts soon draw her into a conflict between her father and her love's radical group. Guest stars: Mariette Hartley, David Hewlett, and Diahann Carroll
10	10	"A Match Made in Heaven"	November 10, 1999
Long trapped by a loveless marriage to the woman he got pregnant and raising two spoiled children, an architect is sent back to pose as a priest. Along the way, he discovers a big secret as he tries to hook his younger self up with the love of his life and stop her from being deported. Guest star: Patrick Duffy
11	11	"The Quality of Mercy"	November 17, 1999
A bigoted prosecutor dies of a heart attack in a rough neighborhood and is sent back as a cop to try to save her former love from a shooting. She fails but then discovers the man she identified as the killer and was executed for the crime was truly innocent. Now, she must convince her grieving younger self to not make the same mistake. Guest star: Joanna Cassidy
12	12	"What She Did for Love"	November 24, 1999
A washed-up actress dies in a freak accident and Mr. Jones uses one of his three "freebies" to give her a second chance. She attempts to nail the audition she's convinced she was cheated out of only to realize that becoming a star is secondary to how to save her life. Guest star: Donna Mills
13	13	"Second Service"	December 1, 1999
Trapped in a wheelchair by a car accident, a bitter former tennis player is given a chance to return to her past. Becoming her own physical therapist, she tries to get her younger self to overcome her bitterness while helping a young girl also injured by an accident. Guest star: Susan Blakely
14	14	"The Gift of Life"	December 15, 1999
Just after deciding to call off her wedding, a bride sees her long-absent father (who she blames for not giving the bone marrow her dying younger sister needed) there and dies falling down the stairs. Sent back as a doctor, she discovers the true reason her father left the family long ago and tries to perhaps save her sister and keep them together. Guest star: Michele Greene
15	15	"Birds of Paradise"	January 1, 2000
A music teacher is given the chance to prevent the fatal overdose of his girlfriend but gets into trouble when he tells their band who he really is. Guest star: Steve Landesberg
16	16	"Take Two"	February 2, 2000
Dying of a heart attack on the set of a commercial, an arrogant and bigoted director is stunned to discover his former love raised their son he never knew about. He's sent back as a costume designer at the theater group they met at, trying to convince his younger, stage actor, self not to break them up for a job with a company making commercials. Guest stars: Daniel Hugh Kelly and William Hutt
17	17	"For Love and Money"	February 9, 2000
A woman, whose son finds a briefcase of drug money in the park years before, uses it to become a successful TV chef but also leads to her son becoming a criminal. Dying in a spa accident, she discovers an innocent cop was blamed for stealing that money and is given the chance to stop her younger self from that mistake. Guest star: Julia Duffy
18	18	"Old Flames"	February 16, 2000
Mr. Jones is stunned when Judge Othniel gives a woman the chance to go back and convince her younger self to have an affair with a friend. But there's a method to the Judge's madness and an important lesson for both the woman and Jones. Guest stars: Michelle Phillips and Amy Price Francis
19	19	"Pride and Prejudice"	March 1, 2000
After dying in a freak accident, a bitter publisher is sent back at first to convince his young wife to become a stay-at-home mom so their daughter won't turn out to be a mess. But when he sees how much his wife loves her job, he begins to rethink his plan. Guest stars: Lance Kinsey, Lindy Booth, and Lisa Yamanaka
20	20	"Party Girls"	May 3, 2000
After losing custody of her daughter due to her drinking, a woman dies in a bar and is given a chance to stop her younger self from this path. But a tragic turn ensures her life will never be the same no matter what. Guest star: Tracey Gold
21	21	"The Trouble with Harry"	May 10, 2000
Dying when his apartment fills with gas, a song writer is sent back to convince his younger self to be more accepting of his neighbors. But he makes the mistake of telling his younger self point blank who he is, which earns him a trip to the psych ward, and he must find a way to get out before his time is up. Guest stars: Jere Burns and Brent Carver
22	22	"Sins of Our Father"	May 17, 2000
After seeing his photo on a milk carton, a teenager is told by his father that he took him and his sister to protect them from their drug-addicted mother. Killed in an accidental shooting, the teen is sent back to get his younger self to discover the truth of what really happened. Guest star: Thomas Ian Nicholas

=== Season 2: 2000–2001 ===
No. overall	No. in season	Title	Original release date
23	1	"Fallen Angel"	August 20, 2000
After being accidentally shot by his own son, a firefighter is sent back as a psychiatrist to get his son to open up and to try to stop his son from beating a younger boy. With him is Mr. Smith, who died in a fire despite the same firefighter's attempts (his last pre-death rescue) to save Smith, who is getting used to this new job. Guest star: Bruce Boxleitner
24	2	"It's a Hard Knock Life"	August 30, 2000
A woman who lived alone with just cats dies and is sent back to the orphanage where she grew up, determined to get her younger self adopted by the perfect family. But along the way, she realizes that the orphanage owner she long hated was under a lot of pressure and that the "perfect" family may not be what she thinks. Guest star: Markie Post
25	3	"Matchmaker, Matchmaker"	September 6, 2000
Dying from a fall at a construction pit, a divorcee learns that her warnings about men will lead to her daughter becoming a bitter and lonely woman. She's given the chance to sway her daughter to love but must contend with her own hard self. Guest star: Lesley Ann Warren
26	4	"Curveball"	September 13, 2000
Mr. Smith is upset when instead of an older abusive father, it's the man's teenage son who dies in a baseball accident. In a twist the boy is sent back to when his father was his age to discover the source of his anger, the truth of his dad's "fame" as a baseball player and to help his father with his own demanding, rough father. Guest stars: Miko Hughes and Ed Marinaro
27	5	"My Blue Heaven"	October 4, 2000
Killed by a man he once framed, a corrupt cop is given the chance to stop his younger self from going down that path. However, posing as an Internal Affairs officer doesn't help or the discovery of his own father's corrupt ways. Meanwhile, Mr. Smith is sent with him as a priest with a bad record to learn his own lesson. Guest star: Ralph Macchio
28	6	"War of the Poseys"	October 11, 2000
Killed on a car ride together, a long-fighting couple are sent back as the owners of the hotel their younger selves honeymooned at. Along the way, each discovers why the other has held such long grudges and try to get their selves back on track. Guest star: Martin Mull
29	7	"The Escape Artist"	October 18, 2000
Executed for the murder of his sister, a stage magician is sent back to discover the identity of the real killer... but must face the fact it's someone he thought he trusted. Guest star: C. Thomas Howell
30	8	"Expose"	October 25, 2000
After wasting her talent, a tabloid reporter is sent back to prevent her younger self from ruining the life of an actress. She finds it hard to sway her ambitious self until she decides to reveal their deepest secret. Guest star: María Conchita Alonso
31	9	"Some Like It ... Not"	November 1, 2000
After Mr. Smith agrees with the viewpoint of a womanizing dentist at only judging women by their appearances, Judge Othniel decides to teach them both a lesson by sending them to sway the dentist's younger self... only both men will be seen by everyone else as women. Guest star: Patrick Cassidy
32	10	"Whistle Blower"	November 8, 2000
A man who blames the toxic waste his company dumped for his son having Down's Syndrome is sent back and intends to ensure his son isn't born to "spare" him from that life. But as he sees his younger self and his wife, he realizes how important his son truly is. Guest star: Reginald VelJohnson
33	11	"Used Hearts"	November 15, 2000
A used car saleswoman is granted the chance to stop her younger self from selling a defective car that killed a teenager. But she finds it hard due to her feelings for the girl's brother and her own secret guilt. Guest star: Jackée Harry
34	12	"Grandma's Shoes"	November 22, 2000
A woman whose brother died of a snakebite because she convinced him to bury their late grandmother's shoes, dies after a return to their run-down farm. The woman intends to get her brother to leave with her and travel the world as she did when she was a teenager. Guest stars: Cloris Leachman and Aaron Ashmore
35	13	"The Night Before Christmas"	December 13, 2000
A woman who has hated Christmas ever since her twin sister walked out on her Christmas Eve and died in a motorcycle accident is given the chance to heal the rift they had over a boy in their band. Guest stars: Stepfanie Kramer and Gordon Currie
36	14	"The Frat Pack"	January 1, 2001
Dying after an argument with his brother, a bar owner is sent back to oversee the hazing of his brother by a fraternity and convince his younger self to cut the boy a break. Guest stars: Dale Midkiff and Corey Sevier
37	15	"Even Steven"	January 31, 2001
Having long blamed a high school bully for ruining his life and costing him his dream girl, a doctor is sent back, at first to get back at this bully but soon discovers all is not what he believed it to be. Guest stars: Ian Ziering, Laura Vandervoort, and Dean McDermott
38	16	"Moonshine Over Harlem"	February 7, 2001
A former gangster in the 1930s, having long lectured at schools about a life of crime, is granted the chance to save his former love but faces opposition from her FBI agent father. Guest stars: Earle Hyman and Candace Cameron Bure
39	17	"Daddy's Girl"	February 21, 2001
Dying of a heart attack on the poker table after cheating at the poker game, a lifelong gambler learns that the woman he walked out on a decade before died and their daughter was raised in a cold environment. Posing as a family services agent, he tries to get his younger self to finally accept the responsibilities of fatherhood. Guest stars: Eric Lutes and Amber Marshall
40	18	"The Knockout"	February 28, 2001
A former boxing champ, who gave up on it all after killing his brother in a rigged fight, is given the chance to stop the death... but still determined to win the fight. Guest stars: Richard Burgi and Malin Akerman
41	19	"Then Love Came Along"	April 25, 2001
A rich man is sent back as a hospital administrator who must decide whom to give a kidney to. He falls in love with a woman who has adopted her orphaned nephew but is also dying from the same kidney disease that killed her sister. When his own younger self gets hit by a car, he must decide whether to save himself or the woman he loves. Leaving the boy without a mother for the 2nd time and with no one else. Guest stars: Daniel Baldwin and Kim Schraner
42	20	"Mama Mia"	May 2, 2001
Having long put her own dreams aside to take care of her daughter and then granddaughter, a woman must convince her younger self to teach her grown daughter to take more motherly responsibility while she follows her own dreams she put aside for her husband and daughter. Guest stars: Joan Van Ark and Yannick Bisson
43	21	"Final Flight"	May 9, 2001
Dying during a flight to see his first wife, a pilot is sent back as a flight attendant to convince his arrogant younger self to correct the mistake that led to a dog's death on board. Meanwhile, Mr. Smith helps a cancer-stricken woman deal with her last days. Guest star: John Schneider
44	22	"The Choice"	May 30, 2001
Having long blamed himself for convincing his father to have a heart operation that left him brain damaged, a man is granted the chance to prevent it but must deal with how else to save his father's life. Guest star: Wil Wheaton, Sherry Miller and Tracy Ryan

== Reception ==
=== Awards ===
Year	Award	Result	Category	Recipient
2000	Chicago International Film Festival	Won	Best Direction, Variety/Entertainment	David Winning (For episode: "Match Made in Heaven")
2003	Chicago International Film Festival	Won	Special Achievement in Direction	David Winning (For episode: "Then Love Came Along")
2000	Columbus International Film & Video Festival	Won	Entertainment	David Winning (For episode: "The Trouble With Harry")
2002	Directors Guild of Canada	Nominated	Outstanding Achievement in Direction	David Winning (For episode: "Moonshine Over Harlem")
2002	Directors Guild of Canada	Won	Outstanding Achievement in a Television Series - Drama	Production crew
2000	Gemini Awards	Nominated	Best Performance by an Actor in a Guest Role in a Dramatic Series	Brent Carver(For episode: "The Trouble with Harry")
2000	Gemini Awards	Nominated	Best Performance by an Actor in a Guest Role in a Dramatic Series	Jere Burns(For episode: "The Trouble with Harry")
2000	Gemini Awards	Nominated	Best Dramatic Series	Stephen Brackley, Michael J. Maschio, Michael Prupas, Barney Rosenzweig and Marilyn Stonehouse
2001	Gemini Awards	Nominated	Best Performance by an Actress in a Guest Role in a Dramatic Series	Cloris Leachman
2001	Gemini Awards	Nominated	Best Performance by an Actor in a Guest Role in a Dramatic Series	Frank Moore
2000	New York Festivals	Won	Television Programming & Promotion - Craft: Program - Best Direction	David Winning (For episode: "The Trouble With Harry")
2003	New York Festivals	Won	Television Programming & Promotion - Craft: Program - Best Direction	David Winning (For episode: "Then Love Came Along")
2001	WorldFest Houston	Won	Television and Cable Production - TV Series-Dramatic	David Winning (For episode: "Moonshine Over Harlem")
2001	WorldFest Houston	Won	Television and Cable Production - TV Series-Dramatic	David Winning (For episode: "Hard Knock Life")
2002	WorldFest Houston	Won	Television and Cable Production - TV Series-Dramatic	David Winning (For episode: "Then Love Came Along")
2001	Young Artist Award	Nominated	Best Performance in a TV Drama Series - Guest Starring Young Actor	Trevor Blumas
2002	Young Artist Award	Nominated	Best Performance in a TV Drama Series - Guest Starring Young Actor	Corey Sevier
2002	Young Artist Award	Nominated	Best Performance in a TV Drama Series - Guest Starring Young Actor	Marc Donato

== Syndication ==
Reruns of Twice in a Lifetime are currently airing on the W Network in Canada and Ebru in the United States.

== Home media ==
Video Service Corp has released two volumes of Twice in a Lifetime on DVD, with each volume featuring two episodes.

In February 2022, Visual Entertainment released the complete series on DVD in Region 1.

== See also ==
- Highway to Heaven – loosely similar concept
- List of films about angels
