= Scott Shepherd (producer) =

Scott Shepherd is a principal at Piller/Segan/Shepherd, an independent content production company that has produced shows such as Greek, Haven, Wildfire and The Dead Zone.

== Career ==
=== Piller/Segan/Shepherd ===
In 1999, Shawn Piller partnered with his father, Michael Piller, to form Piller Squared, an independent production company headquartered in Hollywood, California. After Michael’s death in 2005, the company merged with producer Lloyd Segan’s company The Segan Company to become Piller/Segan. The latest addition to the company and now third partner was Shepherd and the company became known as Piller/Segan/Shepherd.

=== Film Producer ===
Currently he is executive producing Sexy Evil Genius which stars Katee Sackhoff, Seth Green, Billy Baldwin, Michelle Trachtenberg and Harold Perrineau.

=== Television Producer ===
Shepherd is a veteran writer/producer/showrunner with years of experience running network series, having overseen hundreds of hours of television. His list of credits include; The Equalizer; Quantum Leap; Miami Vice; The Outer Limits; To Have & to Hold; L.A. Doctors; Justice League of America; Haunted; North Shore; Tru Calling; Angela’s Eyes; and Reunion.

Shepherd served as executive producer on the television series The Dead Zone, starring Anthony Michael Hall, debuted June 16, 2002, on the USA Network– it was the highest-rated premiere in cable history. The series, produced over a 7-year production cycle is now syndicated globally.

Currently, Scott serves as an Executive-Producer on Syfy’s all new highly acclaimed one-hour drama series Haven which stars Emily Rose(ER). The series was the first to be co-production between NBC Universal Global Networks, Syfy, and Shaw Media. Together they brought a combined audience of over quarter billion viewers. During its first season, Haven, based on the novella The Colorado Kid by Stephen King, was called “A must-see show” by Entertainment Weekly. Syfy renewed Haven for a second season of 13 episodes, which will begin airing on July 15, 2011.

=== Television writer ===
Scott Shepherd has worked as a writer on various television shows such as; Matt Houston; Murder, She Wrote; The Equalizer; Miami Vice; Quantum Leap; Kojak : None so Blind; Over My Dead Body; The Young Riders; Sirens; The Outer limits; Justice League of America; Tru Calling; Reunion; Angela’s Eyes; and The Dead Zone.
