= List of places called London =

London is the name of numerous places in the world:

== Canada ==
- London, Ontario

== United Kingdom ==
- London, England

== United States ==
- London, Arkansas
- London, California
- London, Indiana
- London, Kentucky
- London, Lake County, Minnesota, a ghost town
- London, Michigan
- London, Minnesota
- London, Ohio
- London, Oregon
- London, Texas
- London, West Virginia
- London, Wisconsin

== Other places ==
- London, Belgrade, Serbia
- London, France
- London, Kiribati

== See also ==
- London (name)
- London (disambiguation)
- Little London (disambiguation)
- New London (disambiguation)
