= London Township =

London Township may refer to the following places:

In Canada:

- London Township, Ontario, a former township in Middlesex County amalgamated with other townships to form Middlesex Centre

In the United States:

- London Township, Sumner County, Kansas
- London Township, Monroe County, Michigan
- London Township, Freeborn County, Minnesota

== See also ==
- London (disambiguation)
- New London Township (disambiguation)
