= London (disambiguation) =

London is the capital city and largest metropolitan region of both England and the United Kingdom.

London may also refer to:

== Places ==
=== Europe ===
==== United Kingdom ====
- City of London, the "Square Mile" central business district of London, a ceremonial county with city status
- Greater London, a region of England and a related ceremonial county
- London postal district, a post town
- County of London, a county from 1889 to 1965
- Diocese of London, an Anglican diocese
- London (European Parliament constituency)
- Bay of London, a bay of Eday island, Orkney, Scotland

==== Elsewhere in Europe ====
- London, Belgrade, Serbia
- London, France
- Ny-London, an abandoned mining settlement in Svalbard, Norway

=== Americas ===
==== Canada ====
- London, Ontario
  - London (federal electoral district), a federal electoral district from 1867 to 1968
- London District, Upper Canada, a district from 1798 to 1849

==== Chile ====
- London Island (Cook Island, Tierra del Fuego), an island east of Londonderry Island and south of Cockburn Channel

==== United States ====
- London, Arkansas, a city
- London, California, a census-designated place
- London, Indiana, an unincorporated community
- London, Kentucky, a city
- London, Michigan, a township
- London, Minnesota, an unincorporated community
  - London Township, Freeborn County, Minnesota, includes the community
- London, Lake County, Minnesota, a ghost town
- London, Ohio, a city
- London, Texas, an unincorporated community
- London, West Virginia, an unincorporated community
- London, Wisconsin, an unincorporated community

=== Oceania ===
- London, Kiribati

=== Space ===
- 8837 London, an asteroid

== People and fictional characters ==
- London (name), people and a fictional character with either the surname or the given name

== Arts, entertainment and media ==
=== Film ===
- London (1926 film), a British silent film
- London (1994 film), a British film by Patrick Keiller
- London (2005 American film), a drama
- London (2005 Indian film), an Indian action-comedy film starring Prashanth
- London (2026 film), a Brazilian drama
- London Films, a film studio
- 1920: London, a 2016 Indian horror film
- Namastey London, a 2007 Indian film

=== Literature ===
- London (Samuel Johnson poem)
- London (William Blake poem)
- "London, 1802", poem by William Wordsworth
- London (novel), by Edward Rutherfurd
- London, a non-fiction book by Steen Eiler Rasmussen, published in Danish in 1934, in English as London, the Unique City in 1937

=== Music ===
==== Classical pieces ====
- London, suite by Eric Coates (1886–1957)

==== Artists, groups, and labels ====
- London (American band), a glam metal band formed in Hollywood, California in 1978
- London (British band), a four-piece punk band formed in London in 1976
- London on da Track (London Holmes, born 1991), American music producer
- Thisizlondon (Michael Hunter, born 1999), Nigerian-British music producer
- London Records, a British label

==== Albums ====
- London (Apologies, I Have None album), 2012
- London (Jesus Jones album), 2001
- London '66–'67, EP by Pink Floyd
- London, by Streetband 1978
- London, by Chava Alberstein 1989
- London, by Greater Than One 1989
- London, by D'Influence 1997
- London, EP by Radio Boy 1999
- London, EP by Banks (singer) 2013
- London, EP by DJ SS

==== Songs ====
- "London" (Pet Shop Boys song), 2002
- "London" (Bia and J. Cole song), 2022
- "LDN" (song), 2006, by Lily Allen
- "The London", 2019, by Young Thug
- "London", 1986, by Queensrÿche from Rage for Order
- "London", 1987, by The Smiths from Louder Than Bombs
- "London", 1987, by Roger Hodgson from Hai Hai
- "London", 1997, by μ-Ziq from Lunatic Harness
- "London", 1997, by Third Eye Blind from Third Eye Blind
- "London", 1999, by Noonday Underground
- "London", 2009, by Adam Beyer
- "London", 2010, by AJ McLean from Have It All
- "London", 2011, by Thea Gilmore from Don't Stop Singing
- "London", 2013, by She & Him from She & Him Volume 3
- "London", 2017, by Maty Noyes
- "London", 2019, by Sarah Close

=== Other uses in arts and entertainment ===
- London Group, an artists' exhibiting society
- "London" (Stewart Lee's Comedy Vehicle series 2), a TV episode
- "London" (Stewart Lee's Comedy Vehicle series 3), a TV episode

== Brands and enterprises ==
- London Company, an English company established in 1606 to settle North America
- London Drugs, a retail chain

== Ships and aircraft ==
- London (ship), several merchant ships
- HMS London, several Royal Navy warships
- SS London (1864), steamship sunk in 1866
- Saro London, British biplane flying boat

== Other uses ==
- London System, a chess opening
- .london, top-level Internet domain for London
- 'London', a red variety of Darwin tulip

== See also ==
- Greater London, an administrative region consisting of 33 local government districts: the 32 London boroughs and the City of London
- Little London (disambiguation)
- New London (disambiguation)
