= Lincoln High School (Ypsilanti, Michigan) =

High school in Ypsilanti, Michigan, United States

Lincoln Senior High School
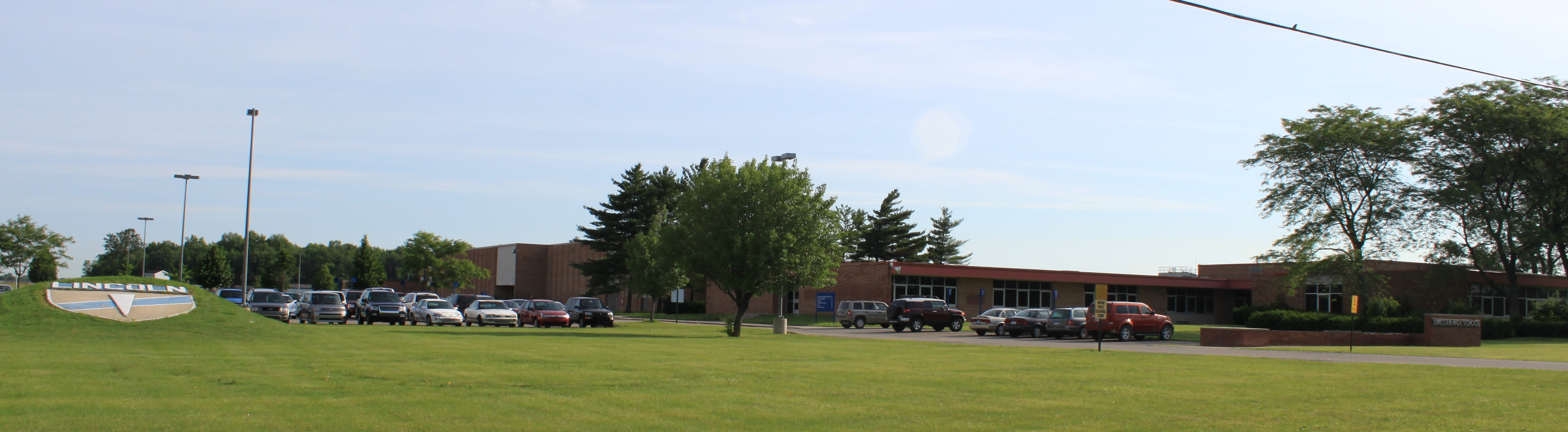

Location
- 7425 Willis Road; Ypsilanti, Michigan 48197; United States; 42°9′30″N 83°36′39″W

Information
- School type: Public, high school
- School district: Lincoln Consolidated School District
- Principal: Wendy Bridges
- Teaching staff: 45.30 (FTE)
- Grades: 9-12
- Enrollment: 810 (2024–2025)
- Student to teacher ratio: 17.88
- Colors: Blue and grey
- Athletics conference: Southeastern Conference
- Nickname: Railsplitters
- Website: www.lincolnk12.org/o/lhs

Student assessments
- 2021–22 school year Change vs. prior year

M-STEP 11th grade proficiency rates (Science / Social Studies)
- Advanced %: 5.9 / ≤5
- Proficient %: 17.2 / –
- PR. Proficient %: 13.4 / 52.7
- Not Proficient %: 63.4 / 26.9

Average test scores
- SAT Total: 904.9 (▼ −20.3)

Lincoln Senior High School is a public high school located in Augusta Township, Michigan. Lincoln serves 9-12th grades in the Lincoln Consolidated School District.

== Demographics ==
The demographic breakdown of the 810 students enrolled in 2024-2025 was:

- Male - 52.0%
- Female - 48.0%
- Native American/Alaskan - 0.2%
- Asian/Pacific islanders - 1.5%
- Black - 27.2%
- Hispanic - 7.7%
- White - 51.9%
- Multiracial - 11.6%

42.2% of the students were eligible for free or reduced-cost lunch.

== Athletics ==
The Lincoln Railsplitters compete in the Southeastern Conference. The school colors are blue and grey. The following Michigan High School Athletic Association (MHSAA) sanctioned sports are offered:

- Baseball (boys)
- Basketball (boys and girls)
- Bowling (boys and girls)
- Competitive cheer (girls)
- Cross country (boys and girls)
- Football (boys)
- Golf (boys and girls)
- Lacrosse (boys)
- Soccer (boys and girls)
- Softball (girls)
- Swim and dive (boys and girls)
- Tennis (boys and girls)
- Track and field (boys and girls)
  - Boys state tournament runners-up - 1984, 1994
- Volleyball (girls)
- Wrestling (boys)

== Notable alumni ==
- BabyTron - rapper/songwriter
- Emoni Bates - basketball player
- Caleb Foote - TV Actor
- Matt Giraud - singer/songwriter
- Kyle Gupton - basketball player
- Tyler Mabry - football player
- K. J. Osborn - football player
- Victor Roache - baseball player
