= Willis, Michigan =

- Unincorporated community
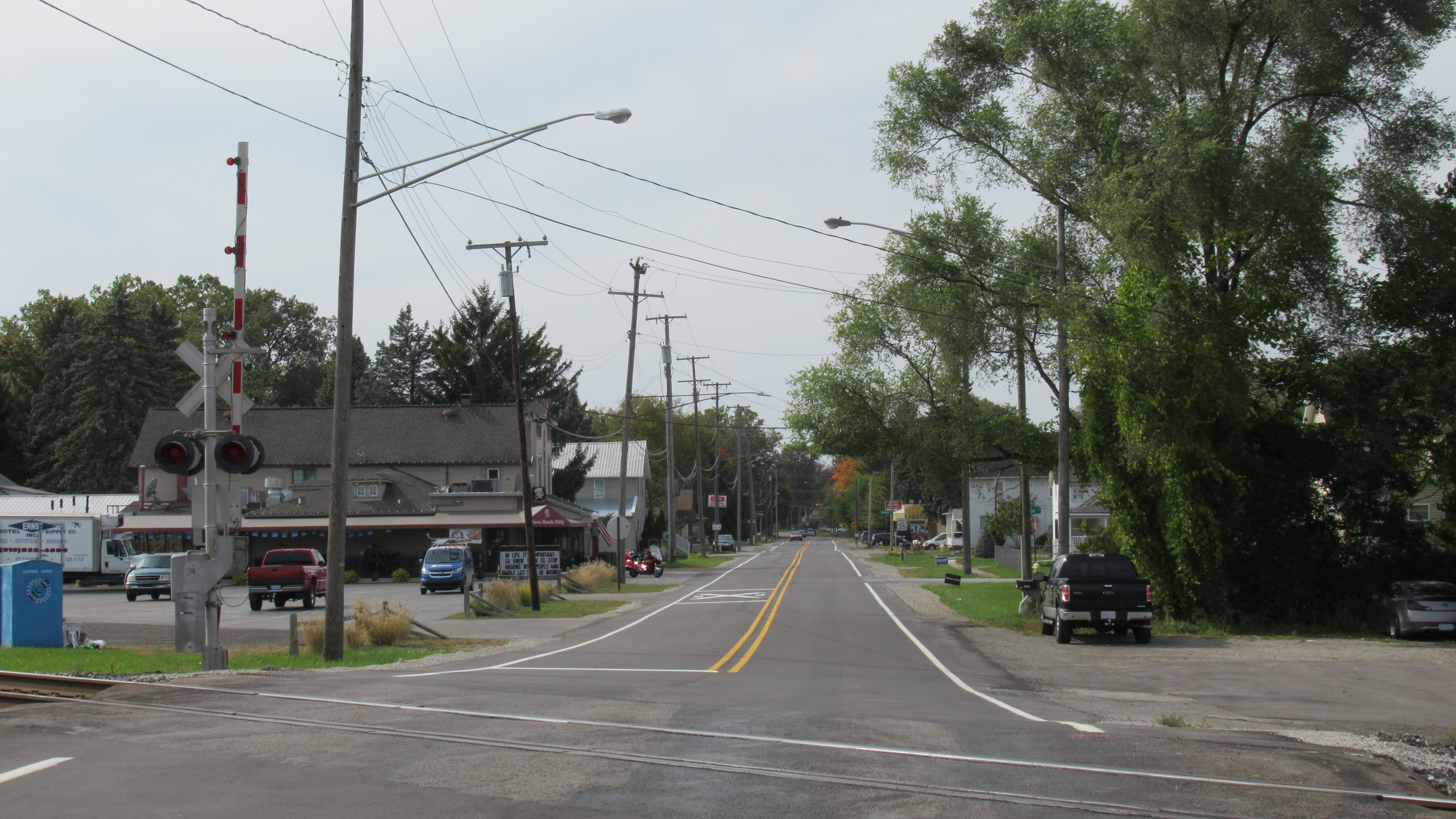
- Looking west along Willis Road

- Location within the state of Michigan Willis (the United States)
- Coordinates: 42°09′30″N 83°33′31″W
- Country: United States
- State: Michigan
- County: Washtenaw
- Township: Augusta
- Established: 1887
- Elevation: 686 ft (209 m)
- Time zone: UTC-5 (Eastern (EST))
  - Summer (DST): UTC-4 (EDT)
- ZIP code(s): 48191
- Area code: 734
- GNIS feature ID: 1616527

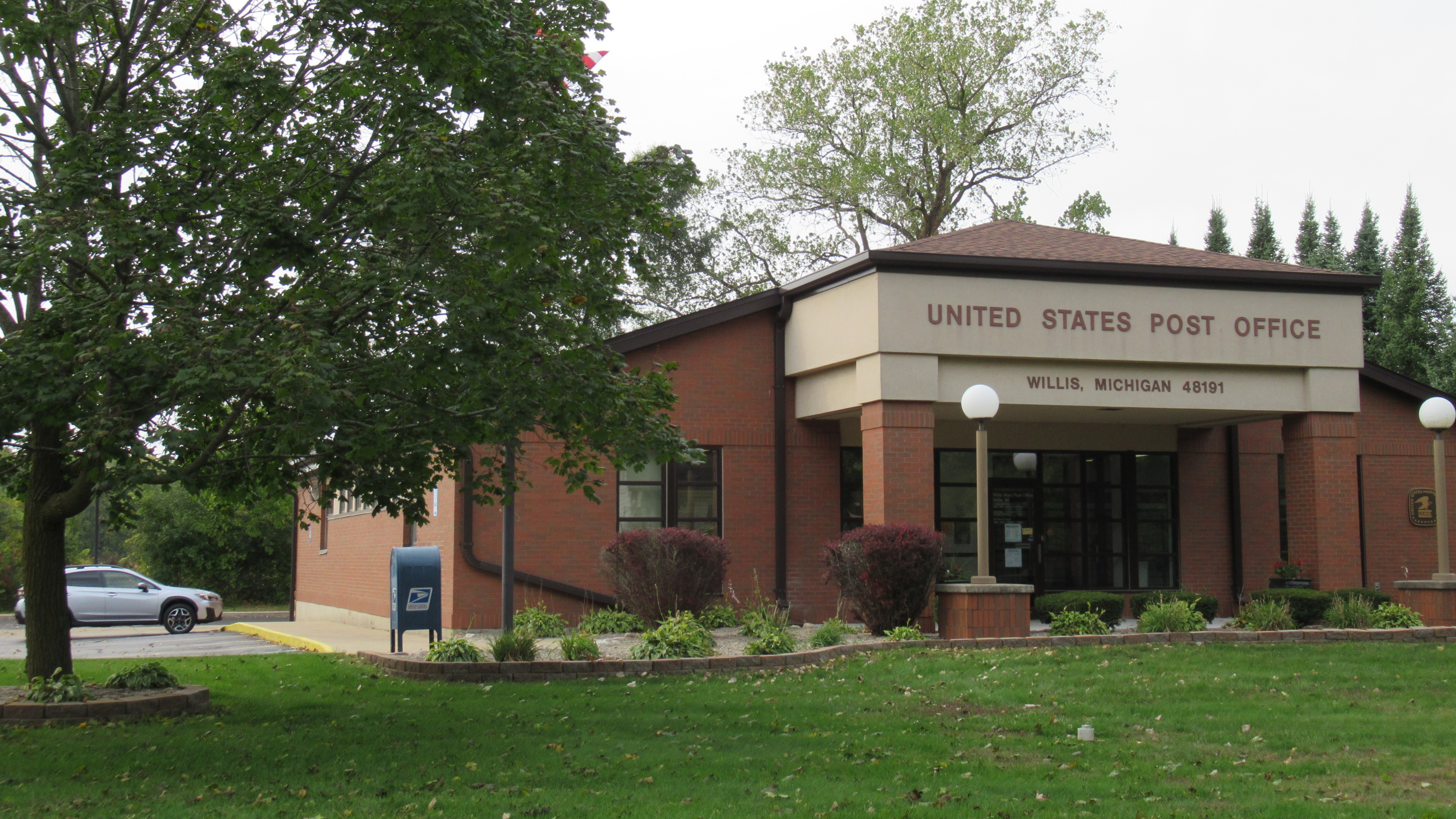
U.S. Post Office in Willis

Willis is an unincorporated community in Washtenaw County in the U.S. state of Michigan. The community is located within Augusta Charter Township. As an unincorporated community, Willis has no legally defined boundaries or population statistics of its own but does have its own post office with the 48191 ZIP Code.

== Geography ==
Willis sits at an elevation of 686 feet (209 m) above sea level. The community is located about 13 miles (21 km) southeast of Ann Arbor in the southeastern corner of Washtenaw County. It is centered along Willis Road between Potterville Drive to the east and Bunton Road to the west. The community of Whittaker is a few miles to the southwest.

Willis is served by Lincoln Consolidated School District.

== History ==
The area received its first post office under the name Paint Creek in 1833. The community of Willis was originally known as Potter after early settler Willis L. Potter and developed just to the east of Paint Creek. Willis owes its creation to the building of a Grand Trunk Railway line in 1880. The Hamlet of Eaton Mills and Paint Creek vied to get the railway, but the railroad decided to split the difference. Mr Potter donated land for the train station, adjacent to the Howell's general store. The General Store is the only building older then the village of Willis, that is still standing. It currently serves as Bonehead's Restaurant. After the railroad came to Willis there was a building boom, with 3 boarding houses built at the corner of Willis and Meridian for the railroad workers. Eventually the businesses in Eaton Corners and Paint Creek migrated to the village of Willis. The Paint Creek post office was renamed Newcomb on September 27, 1881 and finally established as Willis on December 15, 1887. The post office name was changed to reflect Potter's first name.

A single railway line runs diagonally through the community and once contained a railroad station known as Willis Station. The line is currently operated by Norfolk Southern Railway but contains no station in the area.

The Willis post office remains in operation and is currently located at 8790 Bunton Road. The post office uses the 48191 ZIP Code, which encompasses most of the eastern portion of Augusta Charter Township and a small portion of London Township to the south in Monroe County.

== Notable people ==
- Iggy Katona, racecar driver, lived in Willis
