= London County =

London County may refer to:

- Greater London, England, a present-day county
  - City of London, England, a city-county, and enclave of Greater London
- County of London, England, a former county
  - London County Council
- London County Cricket Club, a short-lived English cricket club

== See also ==
- London (disambiguation)
