= Victor Roache =

American baseball player (born 1991)

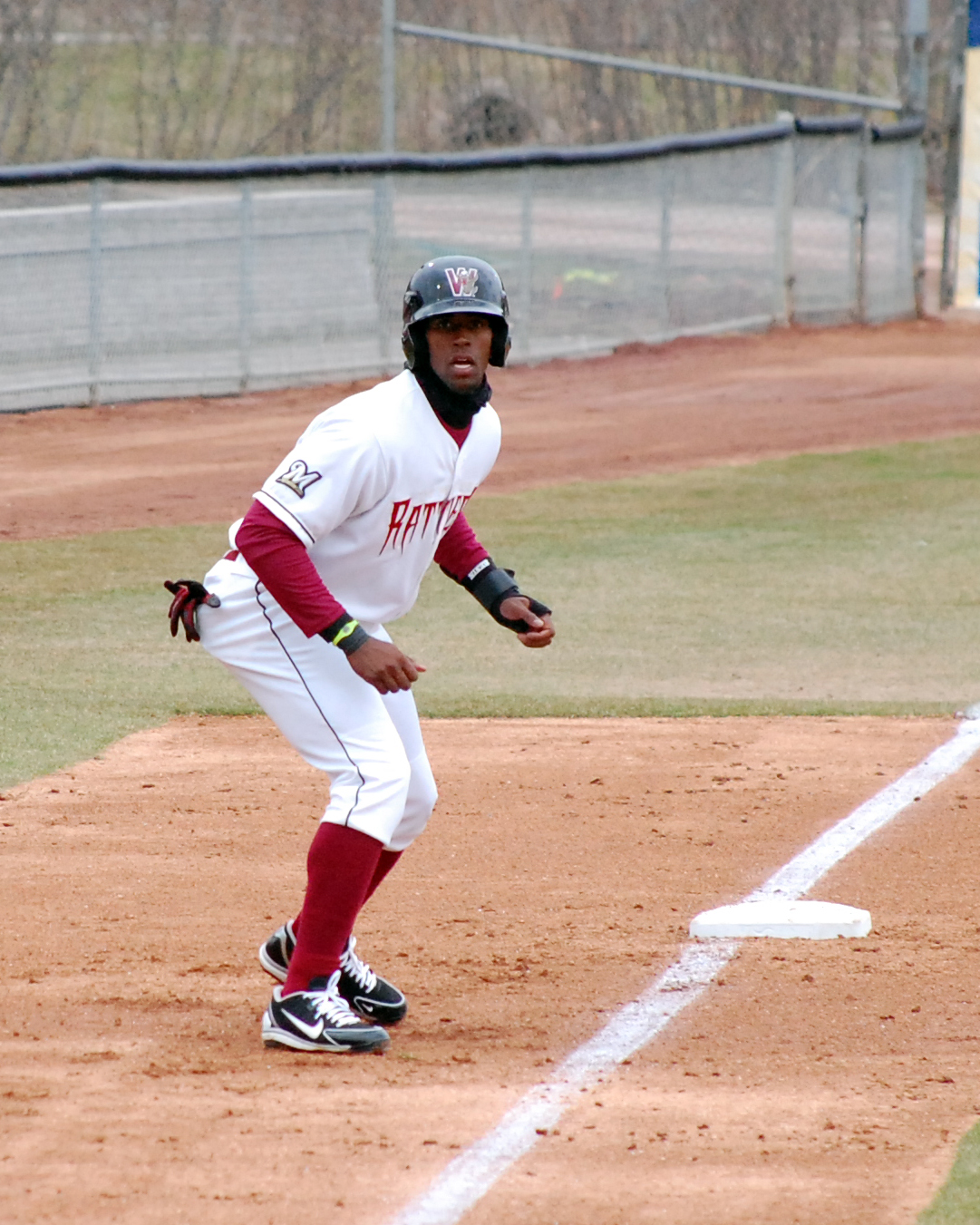
- Roache playing for the Wisconsin Timber Rattlers in 2013.
- Outfielder
- Born: September 17, 1991 (age 34); Ypsilanti, Michigan, U.S.
- Bats: Right Throws: Right
- Stats at Baseball Reference

Almon Victor Roache (born September 17, 1991) is an American former professional baseball outfielder. He was selected in the 1st round, 28th overall, by the Milwaukee Brewers in the 2012 Major League Baseball draft, but never played in the majors after 6 seasons in Minor League Baseball.

== Early life and career ==
Roache was born in Ypsilanti, Michigan. He participated in Reviving Baseball in Inner Cities and attended Lincoln High School in Ypsilanti. He was drafted in the 25th round of the 2009 MLB draft by the Detroit Tigers but did not sign and chose to play for the Georgia Southern Eagles baseball team.

During the 2011 season, Roache hit 30 home runs, up from 8 home runs the previous season. It was the largest jump in NCAA baseball and against a trend of declining power production due to the introduction of new baseball bats in NCAA baseball. He was named to the first team of Baseball America's College All-America Team. After the 2011 season, he played collegiate summer baseball with the Cotuit Kettleers of the Cape Cod Baseball League, was named a league all-star, and received the league's Outstanding Pro Prospect award. In December 2011, Roache was named a preseason All-America First Team by the Baseball Writers' Association of America.

On February 25, 2012, Roache broke his left wrist making a diving play in right field and missed the remainder of the 2012 season. Prior to fracturing his wrist, Roache was hitting .412 with 5 RBI and two home runs.

== Professional career ==
=== Milwaukee Brewers ===
The Milwaukee Brewers selected Roache in the first round, with the 28th overall selection, in the 2012 MLB draft. He made his professional debut on April 21, 2013, for the Wisconsin Timber Rattlers. He spent all of 2013 with Wisconsin where he batted .248 with 22 home runs and 74 RBIs in 119 games. He spent the 2014 season with the Brevard County Manatees. On May 4, 2014, Roache hit the first three home run game in Brevard County history against Clearwater. In 122 games for the Manatees, he slashed .226/.298/.400 with 18 home runs and 54 RBIs.

In 2015, he played for both Brevard County and the Biloxi Shuckers, compiling a .253 batting average with 18 home runs and 71 RBIs in 130 games between both teams, and in 2016, he played with Biloxi where he batted .243 with four home runs and 15 RBIs in only 51 games due to injury. Roache began the 2017 season with Biloxi.

=== Los Angeles Dodgers ===
He was traded to the Los Angeles Dodgers for a player to be named later on May 4. He was released by the Dodgers in August after spending most of the season with the Rancho Cucamonga Quakes. In 57 games between Biloxi and Rancho Cucamonga, he batted .186 with six home runs and 25 RBIs.

=== St Louis Cardinals ===
On February 12, 2018, Roache signed a minor league contract with the St. Louis Cardinals. He spent the majority of the season with the Double-A Springfield Cardinals, also receiving a five–game cup of coffee with the Triple–A Memphis Redbirds. In 121 games for Springfield, Roache batted .218/.295/.380 with 18 home runs and 58 RBI. He elected free agency following the season on November 2.

=== Chicago Dogs ===
On February 27, 2019, Roache signed with the Chicago Dogs of the independent American Association. He played in 97 games for the team, hitting .309/.397/.583 with 24 home runs, 79 RBI, and 5 stolen bases.

On March 12, 2020, Roache re-signed with the Dogs. Appearing in 58 contests, Roache batted .221/.272/.460 with 16 home runs and 34 RBI. On February 2, 2021, Roache was released by Chicago.

Roache retired from professional baseball in April 2021 and took a job at Dick's Sporting Goods. He has since become a baseball instructor and coach.
