= New London =

New London may refer to:

== Places ==
=== United States ===
- New London, Alabama
- New London, Connecticut, the most populous place with the name
- New London, Indiana
- New London, Iowa
- New London, Maryland
- New London, Minnesota
- New London, Missouri
- New London, New Hampshire, a New England town
  - New London (CDP), New Hampshire, the central village in the town
- New London, North Carolina
- New London, Ohio
- New London, Texas
- New London, Virginia
- New London, Caroline County, Virginia
- New London, Wisconsin
- New London County, Connecticut
- New London Township (disambiguation)

=== Elsewhere ===
- New London, original name of St. George's, Bermuda
- New London, Prince Edward Island, Canada
- Ny-London (lit. 'New London'), Svalbard, Norway

== Transportation ==
- New London Airport (Virginia), U.S.
- Groton–New London Airport, Connecticut, U.S.

== Other uses ==
- New London Orchestra, London, England
- New London Theatre, now Gillian Lynne Theatre, London, England
- USS New London (1859), a Union Navy steamer
- USS New London County, a U.S. Navy tank landing ship

== See also ==
- London (disambiguation)
- London, Ontario
- New England (disambiguation)
- New Britain (disambiguation)
- Kelo v. City of New London, a 2005 U.S. Supreme Court case
