= Augusta Charter Township, Michigan =

Augusta Township, Michigan
- Charter township
- Charter Township of Augusta
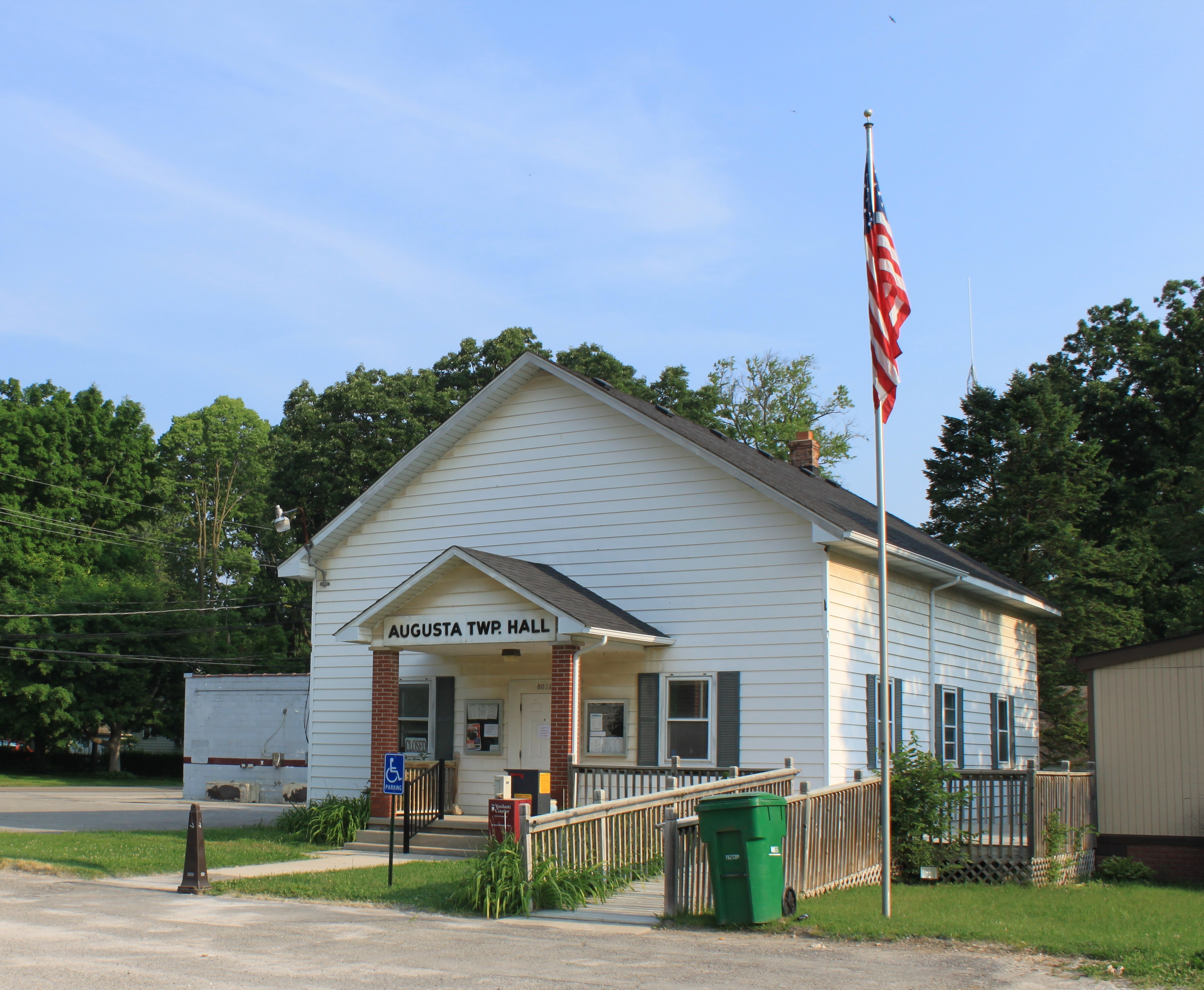
- Township hall in the community of Whittaker

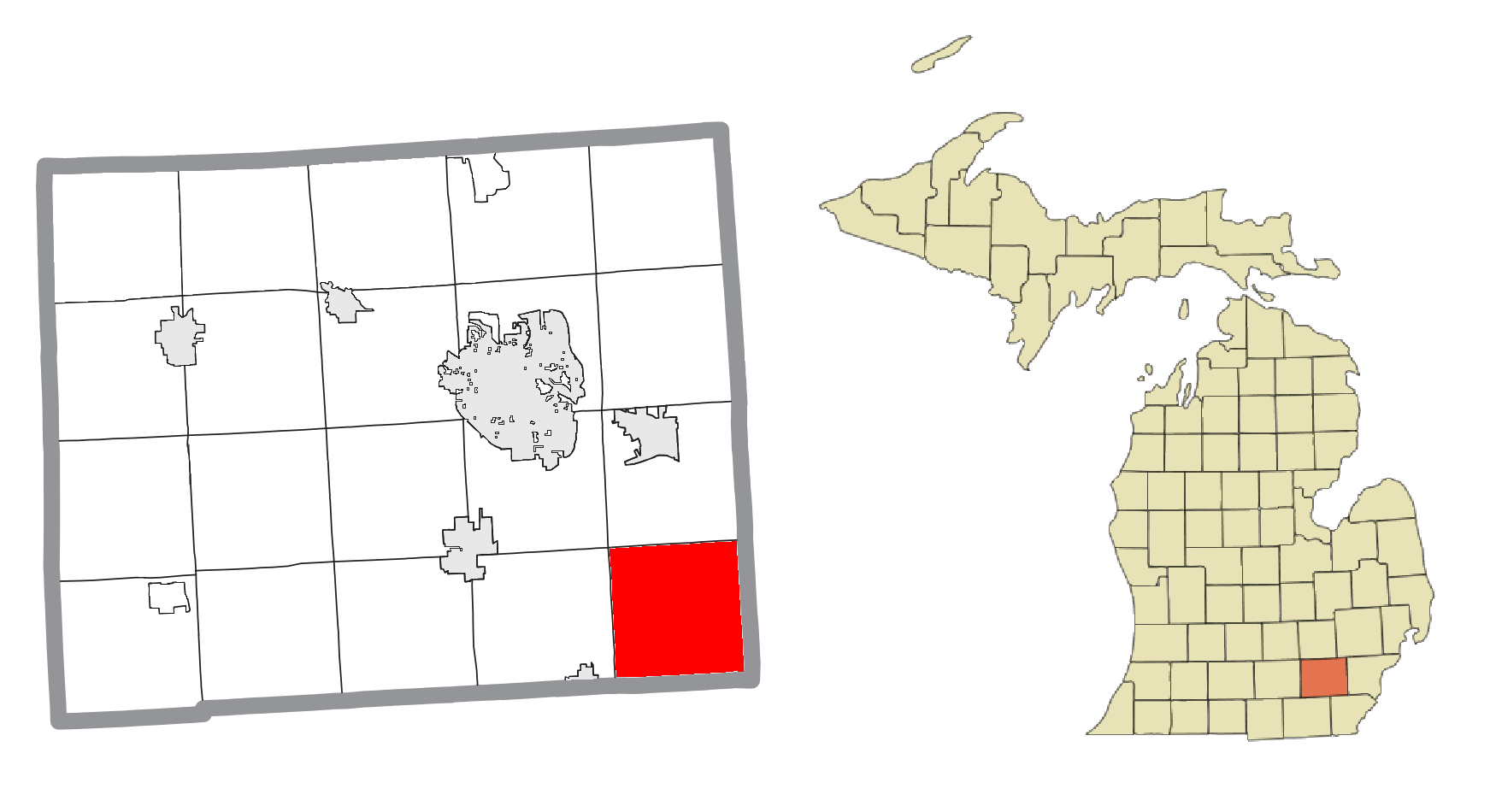
- Location within Washtenaw County

- Location within the state of Michigan Location within the United States
- Coordinates: 42°07′38″N 83°36′33″W
- Country: United States
- State: Michigan
- County: Washtenaw
- Established: 1836

Government
  - Supervisor: Brian Shelby
  - Clerk: Belynda Domas

Area
  - Total: 36.78 sq mi (95.26 km^{2})
  - Land: 36.70 sq mi (95.05 km^{2})
  - Water: 0.081 sq mi (0.21 km^{2})
- Elevation: 679 ft (207 m)

Population (2020)
  - Total: 7,083
  - Density: 193.0/sq mi (74.52/km^{2})
- Time zone: UTC-5 (Eastern (EST))
  - Summer (DST): UTC-4 (EDT)
- ZIP code(s): 48111 (Belleville); 48160 (Milan); 48190 (Whittaker); 48191 (Willis); 48197 (Ypsilanti)
- Area code: 734
- FIPS code: 26-04180
- GNIS feature ID: 1625863
- Website: augustatownship.org

Augusta Charter Township is a charter township of Washtenaw County in the U.S. state of Michigan. The population was 7,083 at the 2020 census.

== Communities ==
- Eaton Mills is a historic community located within the township. It was originally called Conova Corners and was a lumber settlement dating back to the 1850s The hamlet was renamed Eaton Mills after the family that ran the lumber mill for many years. It was given a post office that operated only briefly from June 24, 1878 until September 30, 1879. Eaton Mills was located near the corner of modern day roads of Willis and Rawsonville. The local lumber mills provided the planks for the road from Detroit to Ypsilanti. They were harvested from the local white oak trees. The town slowly withered when it lost its bid to have the railroad come through town.
- Fuller is a historic community located within the township, even though its existence precedes the creation of Augusta Township in 1836. Fuller had a rural post office that operated very briefly from March to May 8, 1832.
- Lincoln is an unincorporated community located within the township at 42°09′26″N 83°36′04″W. The community is centered at the intersection of Whittaker Road and Willis Road near the Lincoln Consolidated School District campus.
- Nelsonville is a former settlement within the southern portion of the township. It was settled as early as 1831 along the Monroe–Washtenaw county line, and its history is nearly identical to the community of Oakville in Monroe County. The name Nelsonville came from one of its earliest settlers and first postmaster Ichabod Nelson. The post office opened on May 7, 1834. The post office closed occasionally and underwent several name changes, including Nelsonville, Readingville, and ultimately Oakville until it closed permanently on February 19, 1904. The community of Readingville is historically listed as being in Washtenaw County, while Oakville is in Monroe County.
- Paint Creek is an unincorporated community located within the township at 42°09′27″N 83°34′54″W. Paint Creek was on the major thoroughfare from Monroe to Ypsilanti. Tuttle Hill Road was a plank road with regular stage coach service. The town slowly withered when it lost its bid to have the railroad come through town. IT is of historical note that Mr Prince Bennent an elder in the Friend's church and one of the premiere families of Paint Creek was a stop on the underground railroad.
- Stony Creek is an unincorporated community located in the northwest corner of the township along the creek of the same name at 42°09′21″N 83°39′10″W. Andrew Muir was the first settler in the area, and James Miller founded the community in 1829 in what would later become Augusta Township in 1836. The Stony Creek post office was established on July 7, 1862 and remained in operation until July 15, 1905. The community is unrelated to the Stony Creek community in Monroe County, which is located much further downstream along the same creek.
- Willis is an unincorporated community in the northeast corner of the township at 42°09′30″N 83°33′29″W. The Willis 48191 ZIP Code serves most of the eastern portion of the township. Willis was founded when the Detroit, Butler & St. Louis Railroad turned down the bids of Eaton Mills and Paint Creek and chose to build their tracks near Howell's General Store. The first buildings was the Wabash Depot and boarding houses for the workers building the railroad at the corner of Church and Willis. Eventually the business that could move to Willis from Paint Creek and Eaton Mills came for the benefits the railroad offered.
- Whittaker is an unincorporated community near the center of the township at 42°07′41″N 83°35′59″W. The Whittaker 48190 ZIP Code serves the immediate area of the community. It was originally called Augusta Center. The named was changed to Whittaker because after Franklin B Whittaker built a general store next to the tracks, all packages for delivery were c/o F Whittaker.

== Geography ==
According to the U.S. Census Bureau, the township has a total area of 36.78 square miles (95.26 km^{2}), of which 36.70 square miles (95.05 km^{2}) is land and 0.08 square miles (0.21 km^{2}) (0.22%) is water.

Paint Creek runs through the township.

== Demographics ==
As of the 2010 census, there were 6,745 people and 2,433 households residing in the township. The population density was 183.6 inhabitants per square mile (70.9/km^{2}). There were 2,613 housing units at an average density of 71.1 per square mile (27.5/km^{2}). The racial makeup of the township was 86.5% White, 7.8% African American, 0.33% Native American, 0.6% Asian, 0.8% from other races, and 2.3% from two or more races. Hispanic or Latino of any race were 2.1% of the population.

As of the census of 2000, there were 4,813 people, 1,728 households, and 1,384 families residing in the township. The population density was 131.0 inhabitants per square mile (50.6/km^{2}). There were 1,791 housing units at an average density of 48.7 per square mile (18.8/km^{2}). The racial makeup of the township was 92.2% White, 5.3% African American, 0.3% Native American, 0.2% Asian, 0.1% Pacific Islander, 0.2% from other races, and 1.3% from two or more races. Hispanic or Latino of any race were 0.7% of the population.

There were 1,728 households, out of which 34.6% had children under the age of 18 living with them, 68.3% were married couples living together, 7.5% had a female householder with no husband present, and 19.9% were non-families. 16.0% of all households were made up of individuals, and 5.8% had someone living alone who was 65 years of age or older. The average household size was 2.77 and the average family size was 3.09.

In the township the population was spread out, with 24.9% under the age of 18, 6.9% from 18 to 24, 30.1% from 25 to 44, 27.5% from 45 to 64, and 10.7% who were 65 years of age or older. The median age was 39 years. For every 100 females, there were 101.0 males. For every 100 females age 18 and over, there were 99.4 males.

The median income for a household in the township was $65,033, and the median income for a family was $70,444. Males had a median income of $52,367 versus $31,146 for females. The per capita income for the township was $27,509. About 4.8% of families and 5.4% of the population were below the poverty line, including 1.6% of those under age 18 and 14.2% of those age 65 or over.

== Education ==
Augusta Charter Township is served by two public school districts. The majority of the township is served by Lincoln Consolidated School District, which is headquartered within the township. A small southwestern portion of the township is served by Milan Area Schools in the city of Milan.

== Images ==
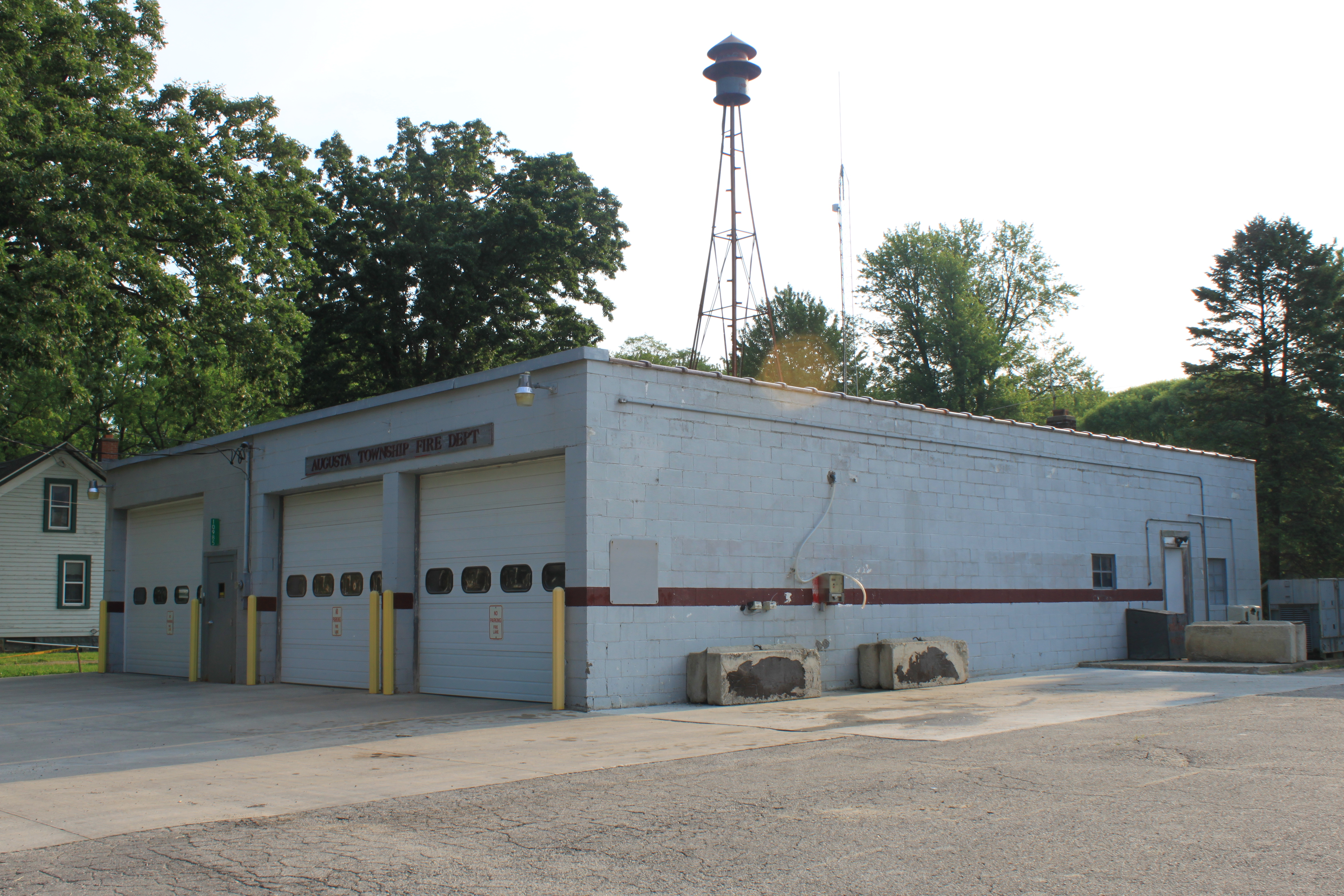
Augusta Township Fire Department

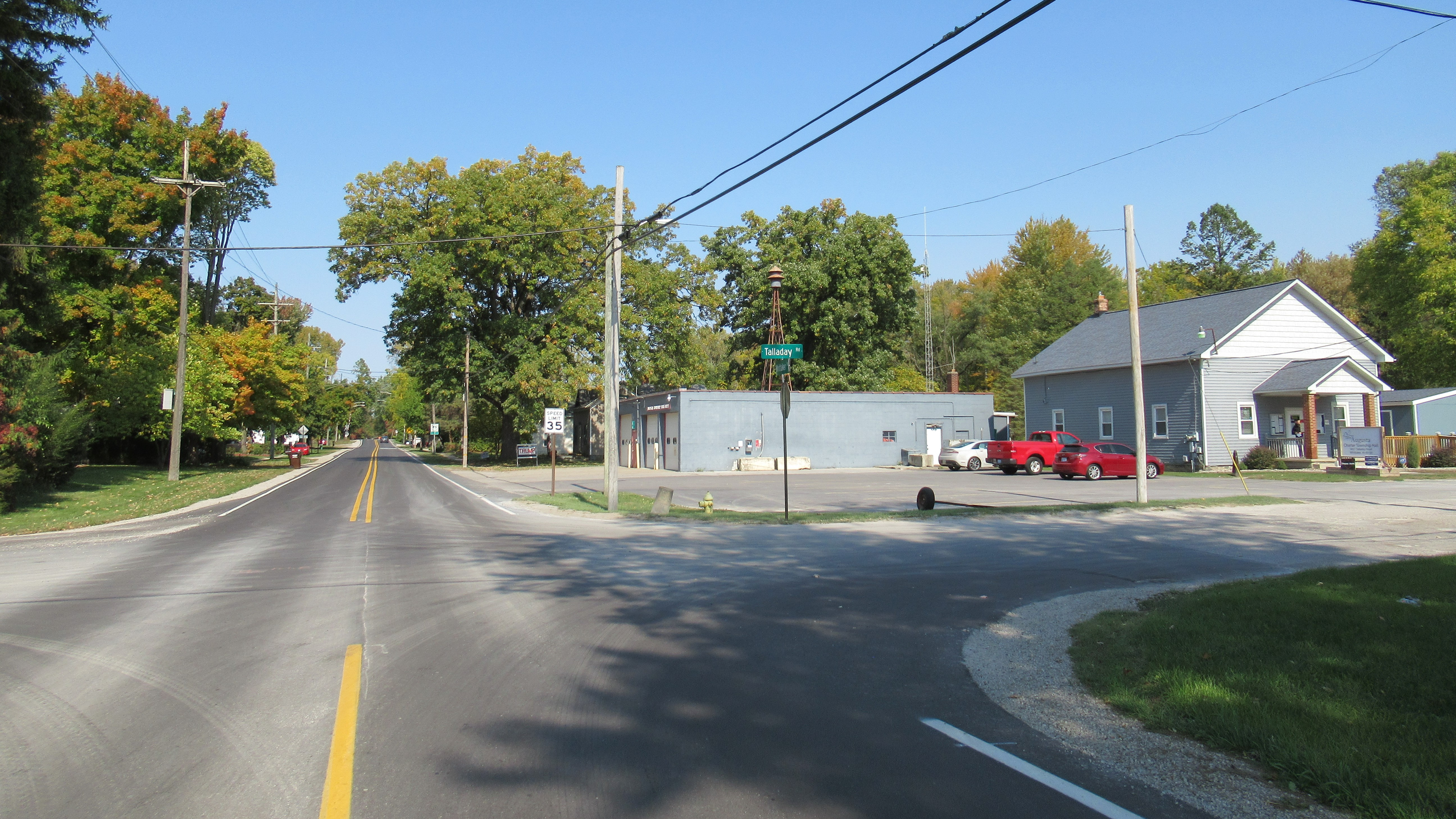
Unincorporated community of Whittaker

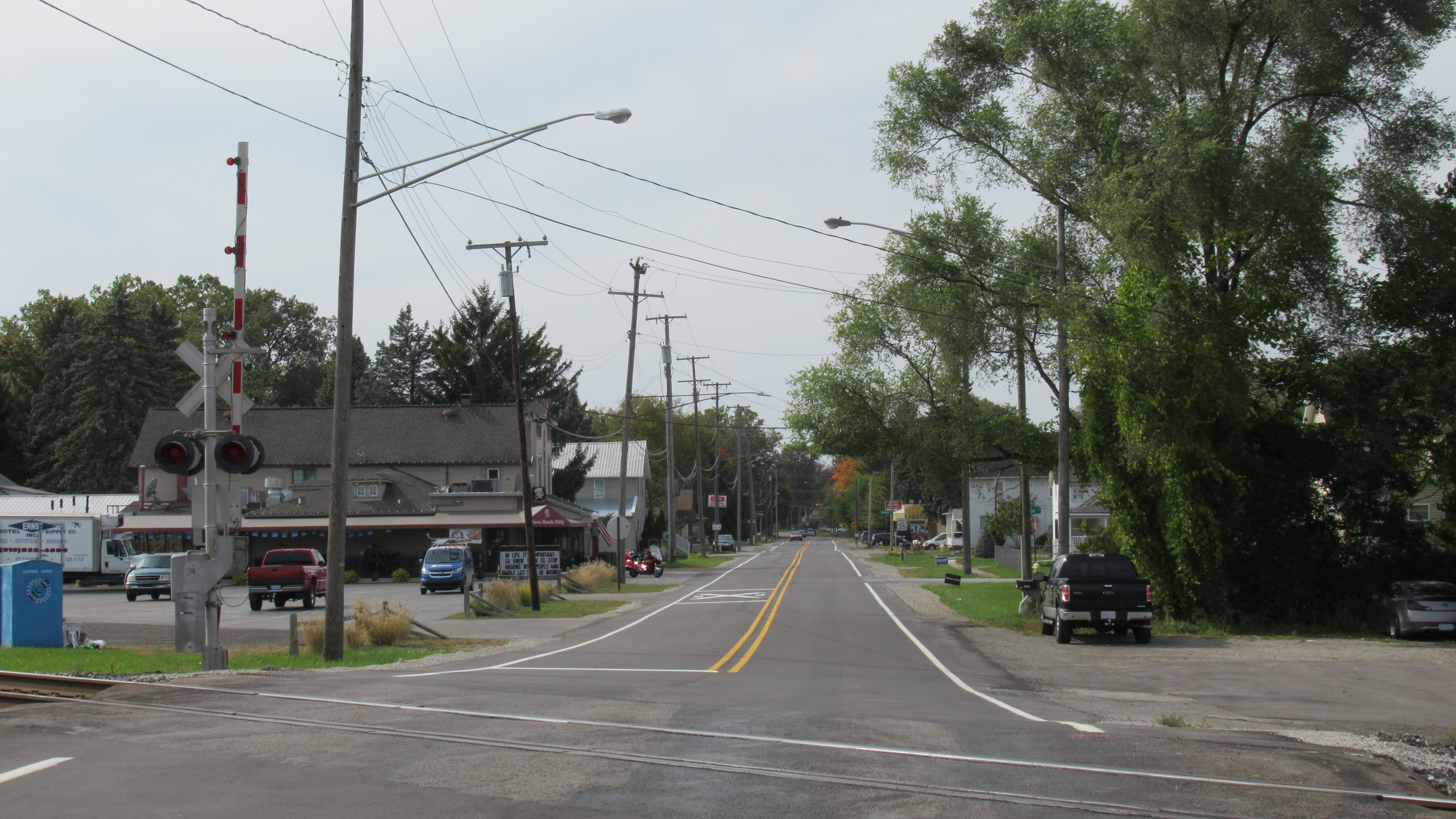
Unincorporated community of Willis

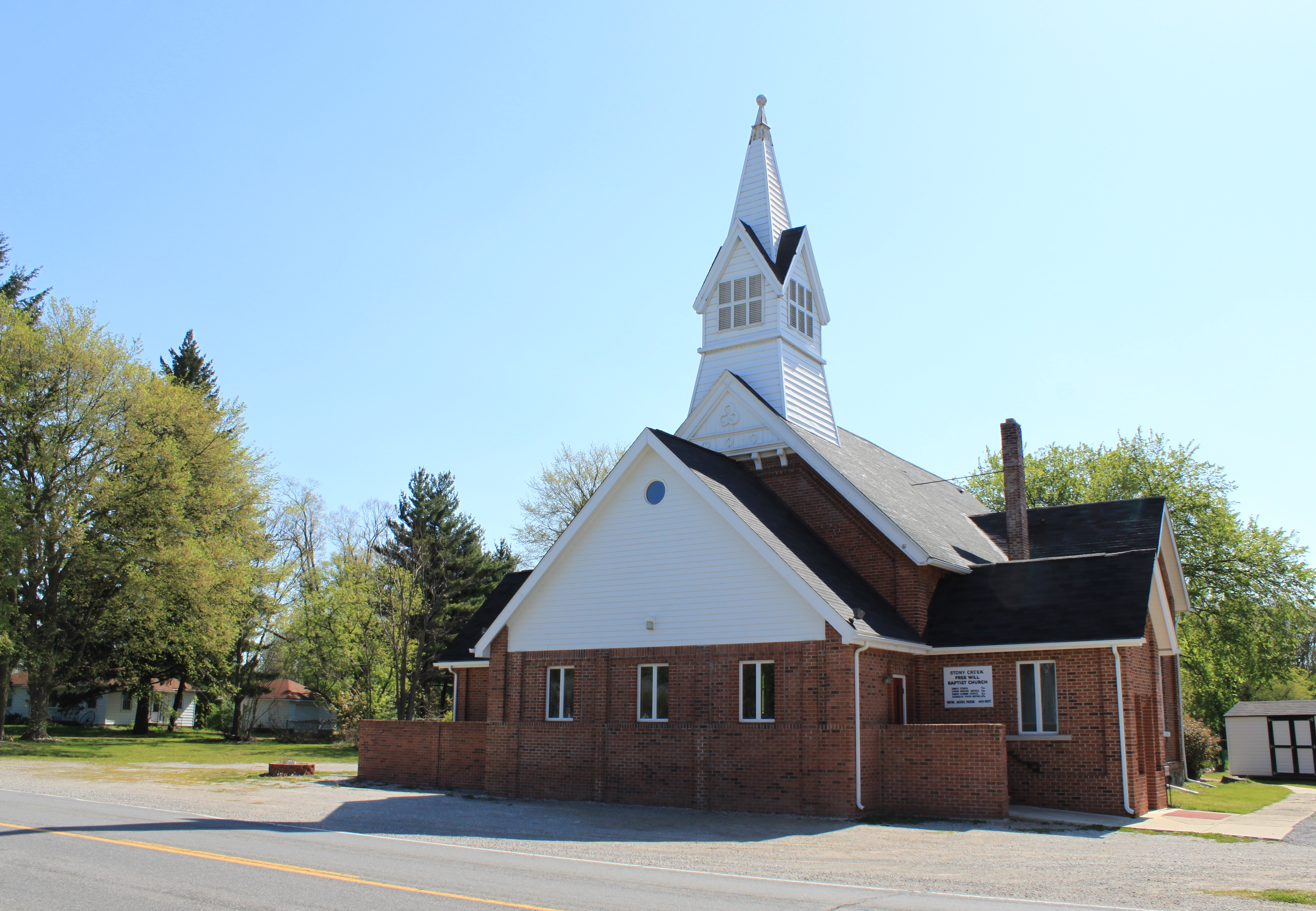
Stony Creek Free Will Baptist Church
