= New London Township =

New London Township may refer to the following places in the United States:

- New London Township, Henry County, Iowa
- New London Township, Kandiyohi County, Minnesota
- New London Township, Huron County, Ohio
- New London Township, Pennsylvania

== See also ==
- London Township (disambiguation)
- New London (disambiguation)
