= Paint Creek (Washtenaw County, Michigan) =

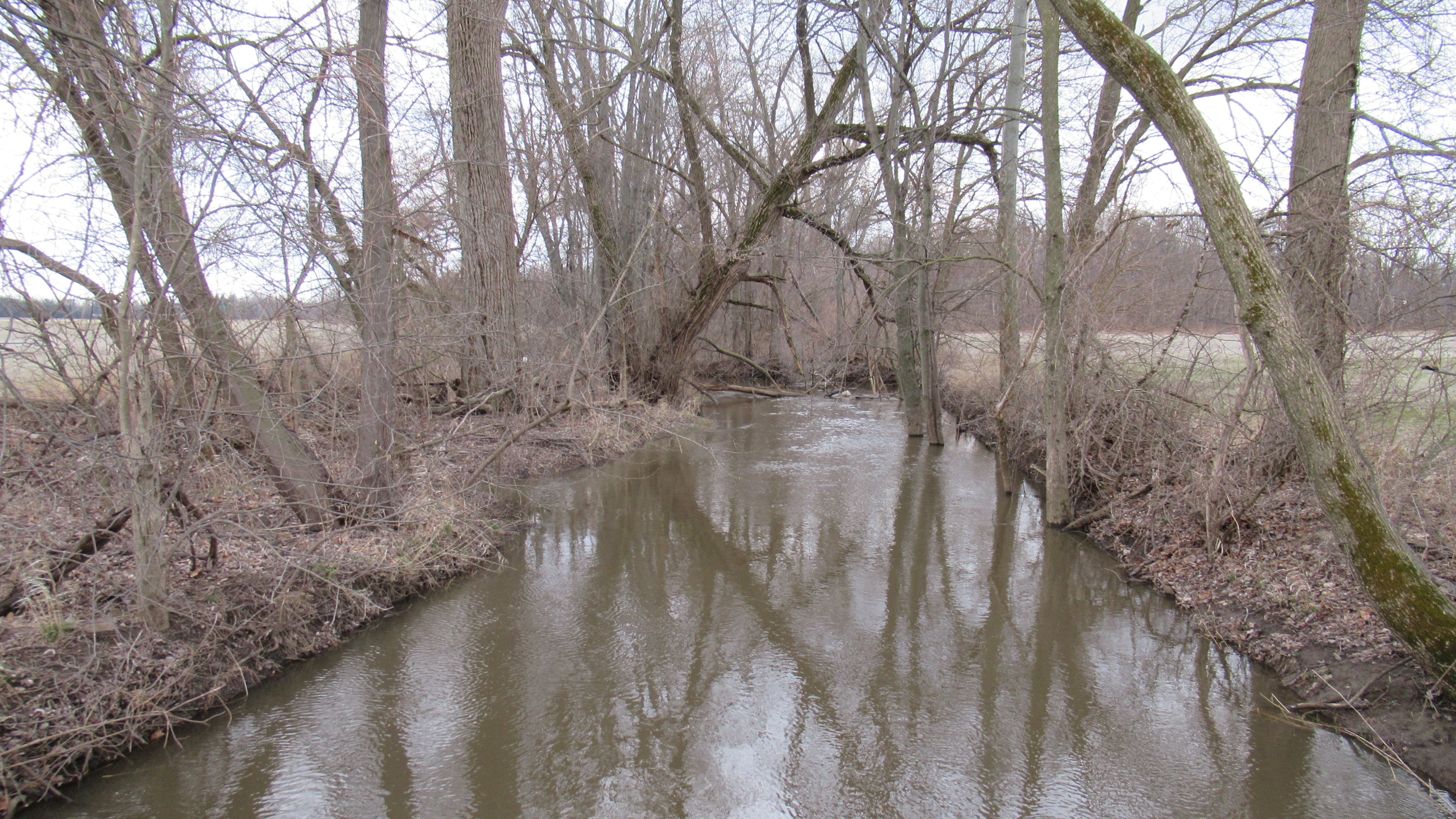
- Paint Creek from Liss Road in Augusta Township, less than a mile from its mouth

- Location within the state of Michigan

Location
- Country: United States
- State: Michigan
- Counties: Monroe and Washtenaw

Physical characteristics
- Source
  - location: Pittsfield Township, Michigan
  - coordinates: 42°13′48″N 83°40′49″W
  - elevation: 827 feet (252 m)
- Mouth: Stony Creek
  - location: London Township, Michigan
  - coordinates: 42°05′05″N 83°34′47″W
  - elevation: 646 feet (197 m)

Paint Creek is a stream mostly located within Washtenaw County in the U.S. state of Michigan. The stream flows south before entering as a tributary to Stony Creek along the county line with Monroe County.

Paint Creek is also the name of an unincorporated community that dates back to 1829. It is located along the creek within Augusta Township.

== Path and water quality ==
Paint Creek consists of an upper portion (sometimes referred to as 'Upper Paint Creek' in documents) separated from a lower portion (simply known as Paint Creek) by a special levee designed to regulate flow and improve water quality. Paint Creek originates within northeast Pittsfield Township just southeast of the city limits of Ann Arbor. Its headwaters were once wetlands around the vicinity of what is now the U.S. Route 23-Interstate 94 junction, but these natural sources have largely been built over, with the present day stream originating from parking lot storm drains. From its source, it flows northeast through Pittsfield Township, eastward into Ypsilanti Township, southeast through the city of Ypsilanti, (nearly parallel to the Huron River), and south back into Ypsilanti Township. Within Ypsilanti Township, Upper Paint Creek enters an 'in-stream detention basin' consisting of a 44-acre (0.18 km^{2}) wetland contained by a levee. The levee discharges to the downstream portion of the creek via an outlet culvert with adjustable flow control, and an emergency spillway for flood events. The creek continues southward, before entering rural Augusta Township.

The only portion of the stream outside Washtenaw County, Paint Creek's confluence with Stony Creek lies just below the southern border of Washtenaw County, in the Township of London, Monroe County. Paint Creek is a major tributary of Stony Creek, along with Sugar and Buck creeks. Stony Creek in turn is a tributary of the Great Lakes, its mouth lies on the western shore of Lake Erie, in the lakeside township of Frenchtown, on Monroe County's eastern edge.

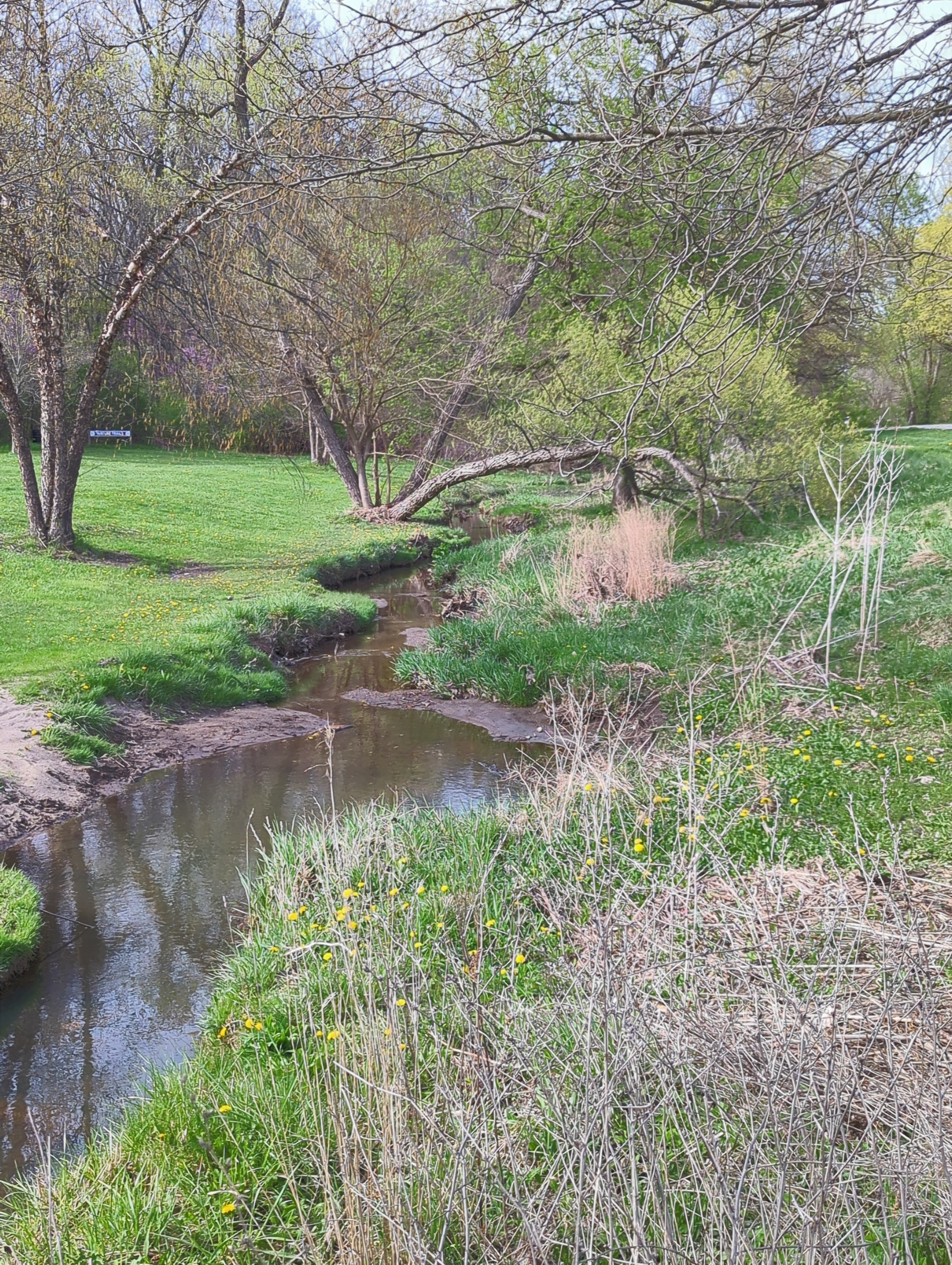
Paint Creek flowing through Montibeller Park in Pittsfield Township, just downstream of its headwaters

A major tributary of Paint Creek is the West Branch Paint Creek, a 4.0-mile (6.4 km) stream that begins near Ypsilanti, and flows into Paint Creek southeast of the intersection of Whittaker Road and Judd Road in Augusta Township. West Branch Paint Creek is prone to increased flooding and erosion, caused by increasing impervious land usage within its drainage basin.

Paint Creek is designated as a coldwater stream by the Michigan DNR, despite water temperatures occasionally exceeding coldwater criteria. Paint Creek has numerous tributaries, including the McCarthy Drain. The upper portion of Paint Creek is threatened by increasing development within Pittsfield Township, Ypsilanti Township, and Ypsilanti, and is known to easily flood during heavy rains or snowmelts.

The creek contains numerous bridges and crossing, including an underpass along Interstate 94 and U.S. Route 12. Many of the bridges are very small, and some of the more rural bridges along the southern route of the creek are listed as "severe" and in need of repairs or replacement by the Michigan Department of Transportation. Bridges listed include crossings at Rosbolt Road and Liss Road in Augusta Township.

Paint Creek is the name of two other Michigan waterways; Paint Creek in Iron County, in the Upper Peninsula, and Paint Creek in nearby Oakland County, just northeast of Washtenaw County. There is also another stream named Stony Creek, different from the Stony Creek to which Paint Creek drains. This other Stony Creek is the namesake of Stony Creek Metropark, and it drains to the Clinton River.

== Fish and wildlife ==
The Michigan DNR once stocked Paint Creek with brown trout, notably being the only fishery stocked stream within the Stony Creek watershed. Limited access and low angler usage led to cessation of stocking in the early 1990s.

Fish sampling and testing along the creek continues with the possibility of redeveloping the creek into a viable fishing location. In 2010, a fishery survey recorded over 20 different fish species observed in Paint Creek. The most abundant species were creek chub and green sunfish, while other species included white sucker, central mudminnow, bluegill, bluntnose minnow, gizzard shad, greenside darter, round goby, and mottled sculpin. Rarer fish observed included common carp, johnny darter, hornyhead chub, orangespotted sunfish, hybrid sunfish, grass pickerel, blackside darter, largemouth bass, tadpole madtom, common shiner, and striped shiner. Only two trout were observed in the 2010 study, although trout are not known to be a well-producing natural species within the creek.

Much of the stream lies in urban areas, however many relatively pristine stretches remain that flow through forest, wetland, and grassland. The upper portion passes through many forested areas, including a nature trail through hardwood forest in Montibeller Park. Much of the lower portion through Ypsilanti and Augusta Townships flows under the shade of forests and farm windbreaks.

Recent development is aiming to increase the creek's usage by providing more access to parks and trails along its route. A proposed restoration project would increase the creek's accessibility, especially in the more developed areas in the upper portion of the creek in Pittsfield Township and Ypsilanti. At one time, Paint Creek was the only designated trout stream in the region but has recently been listed as an impaired river by the Michigan Department of Environmental Quality. Restoration of the creek can ultimately allow for an increased fish population and potential restocking efforts in the future.

The Stony Creek Bridge over Paint Creek was restored in a three month project by the Washtenaw County Road Commission. An older deteriorating structure was demolished and replaced after decay was found to be a danger for both the environment and local commuters who used the bridge.

== Community of Paint Creek ==
A community named Paint Creek was settled by James Miller along the banks of the creek in southwest Washtenaw County as early as 1829. It was originally known by its native Chippewa name of Wejinigan-sibi, translated as Paint Creek, which the settlement was later known by its English settlers. A post office named Paint Creek was established on January 15, 1833, with David Hardy as the first postmaster. The station was an important route linking the city of Monroe to the southeast and the village of Ypsilanti to the northwest.

Augusta Township, where the community is located, was established in 1836, and Paint Creek served as its first post office. The post office was later renamed Newcomb on September 27, 1881, and finally to Willis on December 15, 1887. The Willis post office remains in operation and utilizes the 48191 ZIP Code, which covers most of eastern Augusta Charter Township.

The present-day community of Paint Creek is located just west of Willis and north of Whittaker at the intersection of Willis Road and Tuttle Hill at 42°09′27″N 83°34′54″W. The creek flows north–south just west of this intersection. Paint Creek continues to exist as a small unincorporated community with no legal autonomy.
