= New London, Caroline County, Virginia =

Unincorporated community in Virginia, United States

Coordinates: 38.13874°N 77.31776°W

New London is an unincorporated community in Caroline County, in the U.S. state of Virginia. It lies within Fort Walker, six miles north-northeast of Bowling Green.
