= London, Minnesota =

Unincorporated community in Minnesota, US

London
- Unincorporated community
- Location within Minnesota Location within the United States
- Coordinates: 43°31′34″N 93°03′46″W
- Country: United States
- State: Minnesota
- County: Freeborn
- Elevation: 1,194 ft (364 m)
- Time zone: UTC-6 (Central (CST))
  - Summer (DST): UTC-5 (CDT)
- Area code: 507
- GNIS feature ID: 647008

London is an unincorporated community in London Township, Freeborn County, Minnesota, United States. It is along County Road 34, 903rd Avenue near 120th Street.

== History ==
London was platted in 1900. The community was named after New London, Connecticut. The London post office closed in 1996.

== See also ==
- London, Lake County, Minnesota
