= London, France =

Village in Burgundy, France

Coordinates: 46.6322°N 5.0985°E

London is a small agricultural village in the commune of Savigny-sur-Seille in the Arrondissement of Louhans in Saône-et-Loire, Burgundy, France. 80 kilometres (50 mi) south of Dijon, the D206 road goes through the village.

Its brief claim to fame was its part in an ambush marketing campaign by the bookmaker Paddy Power in 2012. Prior to the 2012 Summer Olympics in London, England, the company sponsored an egg-and-spoon race in the Burgundy village, and then placed large posters in Britain claiming that they were "The official sponsor of the largest athletics event in London this year!", adding beneath "Ahem, London France that is"—there was no explicit mention of the Olympic Games. The Games' organising committee ordered the posters to be taken down, as it only permits Games-related advertising by official sponsors, and prohibits promotion of betting related to the Games, but backtracked after Paddy Power threatened to take the organizers to court.
