= London Township, Freeborn County, Minnesota =

Township in Minnesota, United States

London Township
- Township
- Location within the state of Minnesota London Township (the United States)
- Coordinates: 43°32′32″N 93°6′16″W
- Country: United States
- State: Minnesota
- County: Freeborn

Area
  - Total: 36.1 sq mi (93.6 km^{2})
  - Land: 36.1 sq mi (93.6 km^{2})
  - Water: 0 sq mi (0.0 km^{2})
- Elevation: 1,230 ft (375 m)

Population (2000)
  - Total: 334
  - Density: 9.3/sq mi (3.6/km^{2})
- Time zone: UTC-6 (Central (CST))
  - Summer (DST): UTC-5 (CDT)
- ZIP code: 56036
- Area code: 507
- FIPS code: 27-37916
- GNIS feature ID: 0664813

London Township is a township in Freeborn County, Minnesota, United States. The population was 334 at the 2000 census.

== History ==
London Township was organized in 1858, and named after New London, Connecticut, the former home of early settlers.

== Geography ==
According to the United States Census Bureau, the township has a total area of 36.2 square miles (93.6 km^{2}), all land.

The unincorporated community of London is within the township. The city of Myrtle is geographically within London Township but is a separate entity.

== Demographics ==
As of the census of 2000, there were 334 people, 138 households, and 93 families residing in the township. The population density was 9.2 inhabitants per square mile (3.6/km^{2}). There were 149 housing units at an average density of 4.1 per square mile (1.6/km^{2}). The racial makeup of the township was 99.70% White, and 0.30% (1 person) from two or more races.

There were 138 households, out of which 27.5% had children under the age of 18 living with them, 64.5% were married couples living together, 0.7% had a female householder with no husband present, and 31.9% were non-families. 29.7% of all households were made up of individuals, and 12.3% had someone living alone who was 65 years of age or older. The average household size was 2.42 and the average family size was 2.98.

In the township the population was spread out, with 24.0% under the age of 18, 6.6% from 18 to 24, 26.6% from 25 to 44, 26.3% from 45 to 64, and 16.5% who were 65 years of age or older. The median age was 40 years. For every 100 females, there were 114.1 males. For every 100 females age 18 and over, there were 115.3 males.

The median income for a household in the township was $37,500, and the median income for a family was $43,571. Males had a median income of $24,615 versus $22,778 for females. The per capita income for the township was $16,882. About 1.1% of families and 1.2% of the population were below the poverty line, including none of those under age 18 and 3.6% of those age 65 or over.
