= Lincoln Consolidated School District (Michigan) =

Public school district

Lincoln Consolidated Schools

Address
- 7425 Willis Road Ypsilanti, Washtenaw, Michigan, 48197; United States

District information
- Grades: Pre-Kindergarten-12
- Superintendent: Gregory Smith
- Schools: 6
- Budget: $66,782,000 2022-2023 expenditures
- NCES District ID: 2621570

Students and staff
- Students: 3,416 (2024-2025)
- Teachers: 202.79 (on an FTE basis) (2024-2025)
- Staff: 518.1 FTE (2024-2025)
- Student–teacher ratio: 16.85 (2024-2025)

Other information
- Website: www.lincolnk12.org

Lincoln Consolidated Schools is a public school district near Ypsilanti, Michigan. In Washtenaw County, it serves parts of Augusta Township, York Township, and Ypsilanti Township. In Wayne County, it serves parts of Sumpter Township and Van Buren Township.

== History ==
Dr. Marvin Pittman, a professor at what is now Eastern Michigan University, was a proponent of public education. In 1921, he had the innovative idea of consolidating the one-room schoolhouse districts south of Ypsilanti into a single district that would provide agricultural training and give students a pathway to attend university. Because of his advocacy organization, Michigan Trailblazers, the districts consolidated in 1922 and 1923, and in fall 1924, The Agricultural Rural Training School No. 1 of Ypsilanti and Augusta Townships opened at the corner of Willis and Whitaker Roads. The community then chose to name the district Lincoln Consolidated (although the Trailblazer District was considered). Originally, the teachers were instructors and students from the University, then known as Michigan State Normal College.

On December 5, 1925, the building was destroyed by a fire. It reopened in 1927 after being rebuilt. The architect was The Warren Holmes-Power Company. Additions were built in 1936 and 1951. The building serves today as Brick Elementary.

Several schools in the district share a campus with the original building. Model Elementary, named after a schoolhouse that had been built in 1844, was built there in 1956. The current Lincoln High School was built in 1961 and expanded in 1996. Lowden School, an 1853 schoolhouse, was restored and moved to the campus in 1989. Lincoln Middle School was built in 2001. Childs Elementary was built north of campus in 2003.

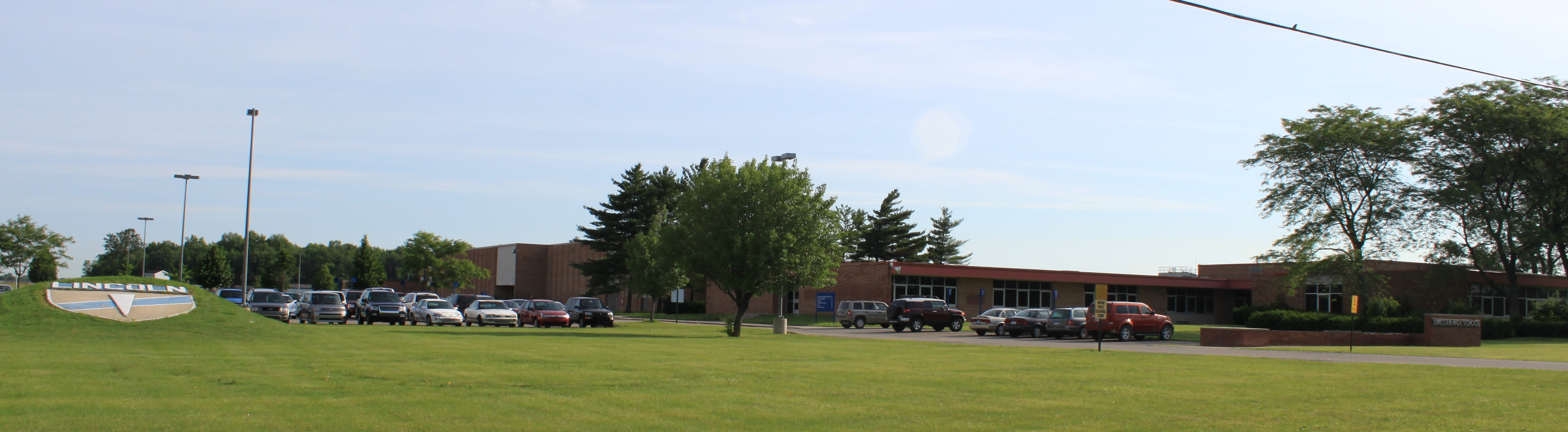
Lincoln High School

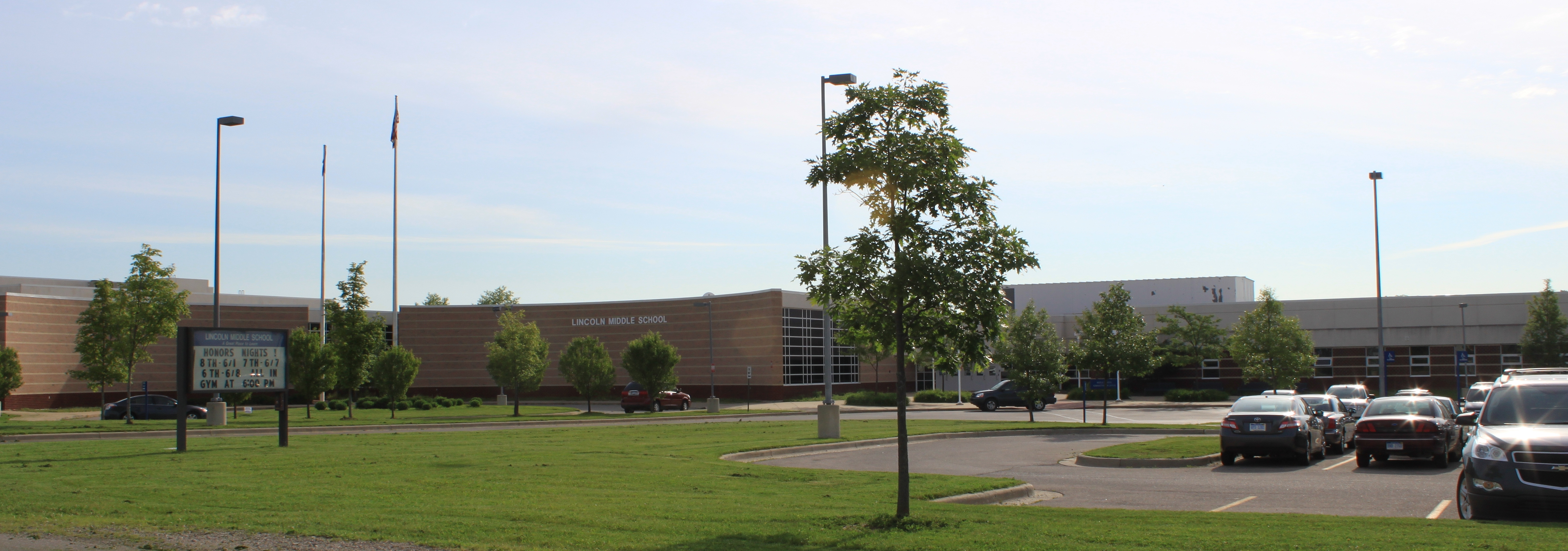
Lincoln Middle School

== Schools ==
Schools in Lincoln Consolidated Schools District
School	Address	Notes
Lincoln High School	7425 Willis Road, Ypsilanti	Grades 9-12. Built 1961.
Lincoln Middle School	8744 Whittaker Road, Ypsilanti	Grades 6-8. Built 2001.
Brick Elementary School	8970 Whittaker Road, Ypsilanti	Grades K-5. Built 1924.
Childs Elementary School	7300 Bemis Road, Ypsilanti	Grades K-5. Built 2003.
Lincoln Early Childhood at Model Elementary	8850 Whittaker Road, Ypsilanti	Preschool. Built 1956.
Bishop Elementary School	8888 Whittaker Road, Ypsilanti	Grades K-5
