= London, California =

Census designated place in California, US

- Census designated place
- Location in Tulare County and the state of California

- Location in the United States
- Coordinates: 36°28′34″N 119°26′32″W
- Country: United States
- State: California
- County: Tulare
- Named for: London, England

Area
  - Total: 0.817 sq mi (2.115 km^{2})
  - Land: 0.817 sq mi (2.115 km^{2})
  - Water: 0 sq mi (0 km^{2}) 0%
- Elevation: 299 ft (91 m)

Population (2020)
  - Total: 1,518
  - Density: 1,859/sq mi (717.7/km^{2})
- Time zone: UTC-8 (Pacific)
  - Summer (DST): UTC-7 (PDT)
- ZIP code: 93618
- Area code: 559
- FIPS code: 06-42566
- GNIS feature ID: 1652746

London is a census designated place (CDP) in Tulare County, California, United States. The population was 1,518 at the 2020 census, down from 1,869 at the 2010 census.

== Geography ==
London is located at 36°28′34″N 119°26′32″W (36.475995, -119.442332).

According to the United States Census Bureau, the CDP has a total area of 0.8 square miles (2.1 km^{2}), all land.

== Demographics ==
Historical population
Census	Pop.	Note	%±
1980	1,257		—
1990	1,638		30.3%
2000	1,848		12.8%
2010	1,869		1.1%
2020	1,518		−18.8%
U.S. Decennial Census; 1850–1870 1880-1890; 1900 1910 1920; 1930 1940 1950; 1960 1970 1980; 1990 2000 2010

London first appeared as a census designated place in the 1980 United States census.

=== 2020 census ===
As of the 2020 census, London had a population of 1,518. The population density was 1,858.0 inhabitants per square mile (717.4/km^{2}). The age distribution was 500 people (32.9%) under the age of 18, 162 people (10.7%) aged 18 to 24, 398 people (26.2%) aged 25 to 44, 317 people (20.9%) aged 45 to 64, and 141 people (9.3%) who were 65 years of age or older. The median age was 29.6 years. For every 100 females, there were 113.8 males, and for every 100 females age 18 and over, there were 118.0 males.

Racial composition as of the 2020 census
Race	Number	Percent
White	391	25.8%
Black or African American	2	0.1%
American Indian and Alaska Native	12	0.8%
Asian	5	0.3%
Native Hawaiian and Other Pacific Islander	1	0.1%
Some other race	898	59.2%
Two or more races	209	13.8%
Hispanic or Latino (of any race)	1,407	92.7%

The Census reported that 1,518 people (100% of the population) lived in households. There were 379 households, out of which 208 (54.9%) had children under the age of 18 living in them, 204 (53.8%) were married-couple households, 42 (11.1%) were cohabiting couple households, 68 (17.9%) had a male householder with no spouse or partner present, and 65 (17.2%) had a female householder with no spouse or partner present. 36 households (9.5%) were one person, and 13 (3.4%) were one person aged 65 or older. The average household size was 4.01. There were 326 families (86.0% of all households).

There were 396 housing units at an average density of 484.7 units per square mile (187.1 units/km^{2}), of which 379 (95.7%) were occupied. Of these, 143 (37.7%) were owner-occupied, and 236 (62.3%) were occupied by renters. The homeowner vacancy rate was 0.0% and the rental vacancy rate was 0.8%.

0.0% of residents lived in urban areas, while 100.0% lived in rural areas.

=== Income and poverty ===
In 2023, the US Census Bureau estimated that the median household income was $48,618, and the per capita income was $14,553. About 41.1% of families and 46.6% of the population were below the poverty line.

=== 2010 census ===
The 2010 United States census reported that London had a population of 1,869. The population density was 2,970.0 inhabitants per square mile (1,146.7/km^{2}). The racial makeup of London was 761 (40.7%) White, 6 (0.3%) African American, 46 (2.5%) Native American, 0 (0.0%) Asian, 0 (0.0%) Pacific Islander, 976 (52.2%) from other races, and 80 (4.3%) from two or more races. Hispanic or Latino of any race were 1,737 persons (92.9%).

The Census reported that 1,869 people (100% of the population) lived in households, 0 (0%) lived in non-institutionalized group quarters, and 0 (0%) were institutionalized.

There were 393 households, out of which 264 (67.2%) had children under the age of 18 living in them, 217 (55.2%) were opposite-sex married couples living together, 79 (20.1%) had a female householder with no husband present, 55 (14.0%) had a male householder with no wife present. There were 42 (10.7%) unmarried opposite-sex partnerships, and 5 (1.3%) same-sex married couples or partnerships. 20 households (5.1%) were made up of individuals, and 10 (2.5%) had someone living alone who was 65 years of age or older. The average household size was 4.76. There were 351 families (89.3% of all households); the average family size was 4.56.

The age distribution was 676 people (36.2%) under the age of 18, 235 people (12.6%) aged 18 to 24, 545 people (29.2%) aged 25 to 44, 326 people (17.4%) aged 45 to 64, and 87 people (4.7%) who were 65 years of age or older. The median age was 25.6 years. For every 100 females, there were 123.3 males. For every 100 females age 18 and over, there were 136.2 males.

There were 408 housing units at an average density of 648.3 per square mile (250.3/km^{2}), of which 157 (39.9%) were owner-occupied, and 236 (60.1%) were occupied by renters. The homeowner vacancy rate was 0.6%; the rental vacancy rate was 1.7%. 691 people (37.0% of the population) lived in owner-occupied housing units and 1,178 people (63.0%) lived in rental housing units.

== Government ==
In the California State Legislature, London is in the 16th senatorial district, represented by Democrat Melissa Hurtado, and the 33rd Assembly district, represented by Republican Alexandra Macedo.

In the United States House of Representatives, London is in California's 21st congressional district, represented by Democrat Jim Costa

== Education ==
London is served by the Kings River Union Elementary School District and by the Dinuba Unified School District for grades 9–12.
