= London, Lake County, Minnesota =

Abandoned town in Minnesota, US

Coordinates: 47°12′10″N 91°34′11″W

London, Minnesota is an abandoned ghost town located "along an old back road leading from the village of Finland back towards Route 61 and the shores of Lake Superior, about 75 miles northeast of Duluth."

== Sources ==
- Haunted Minnesota, Ghosts And Strange Phenomena of the North Star State by Charles A. Stansfield.
