= London Township, Michigan =

- Civil township
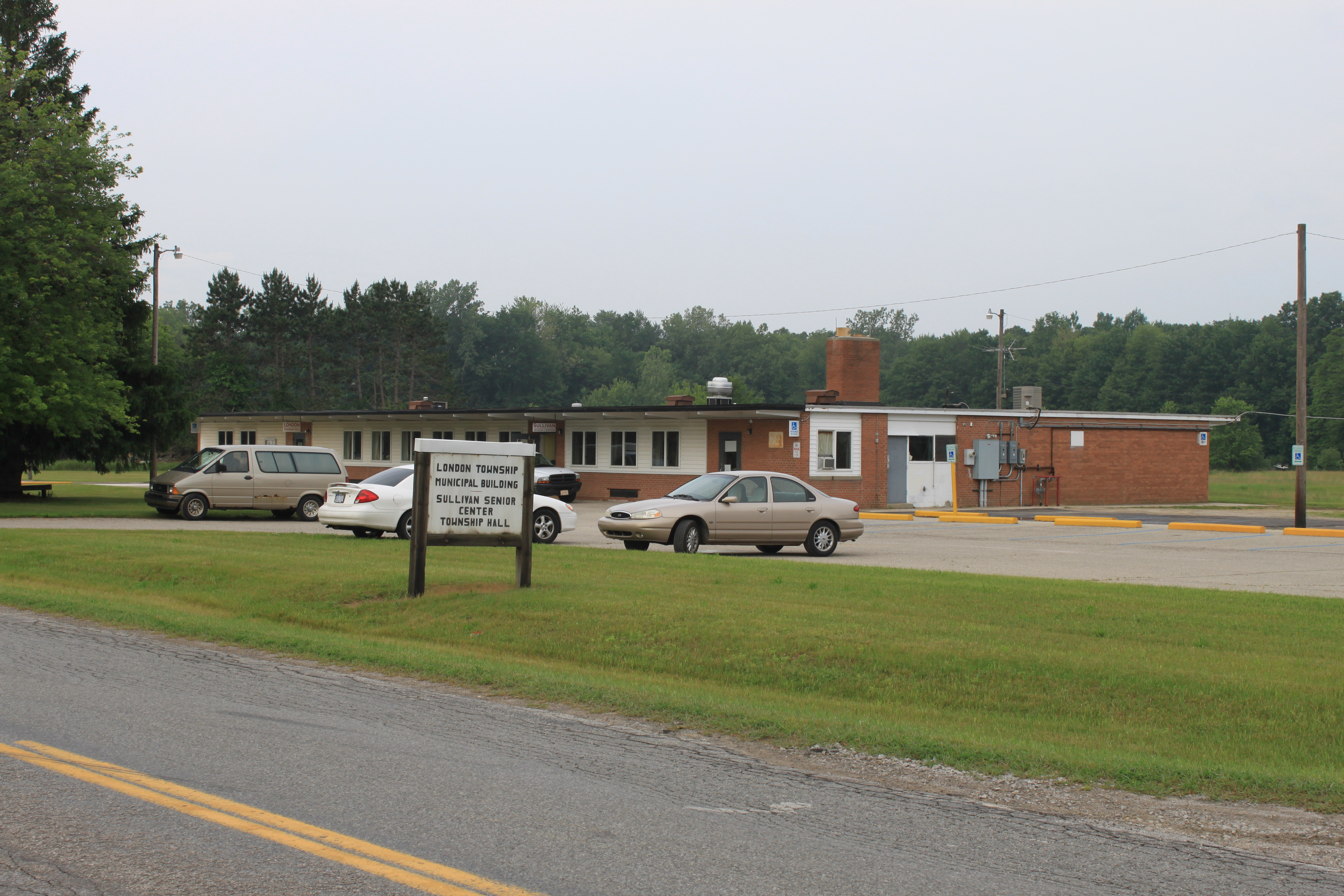
- Municipal Building on Tuttle Hill Road

- Banner

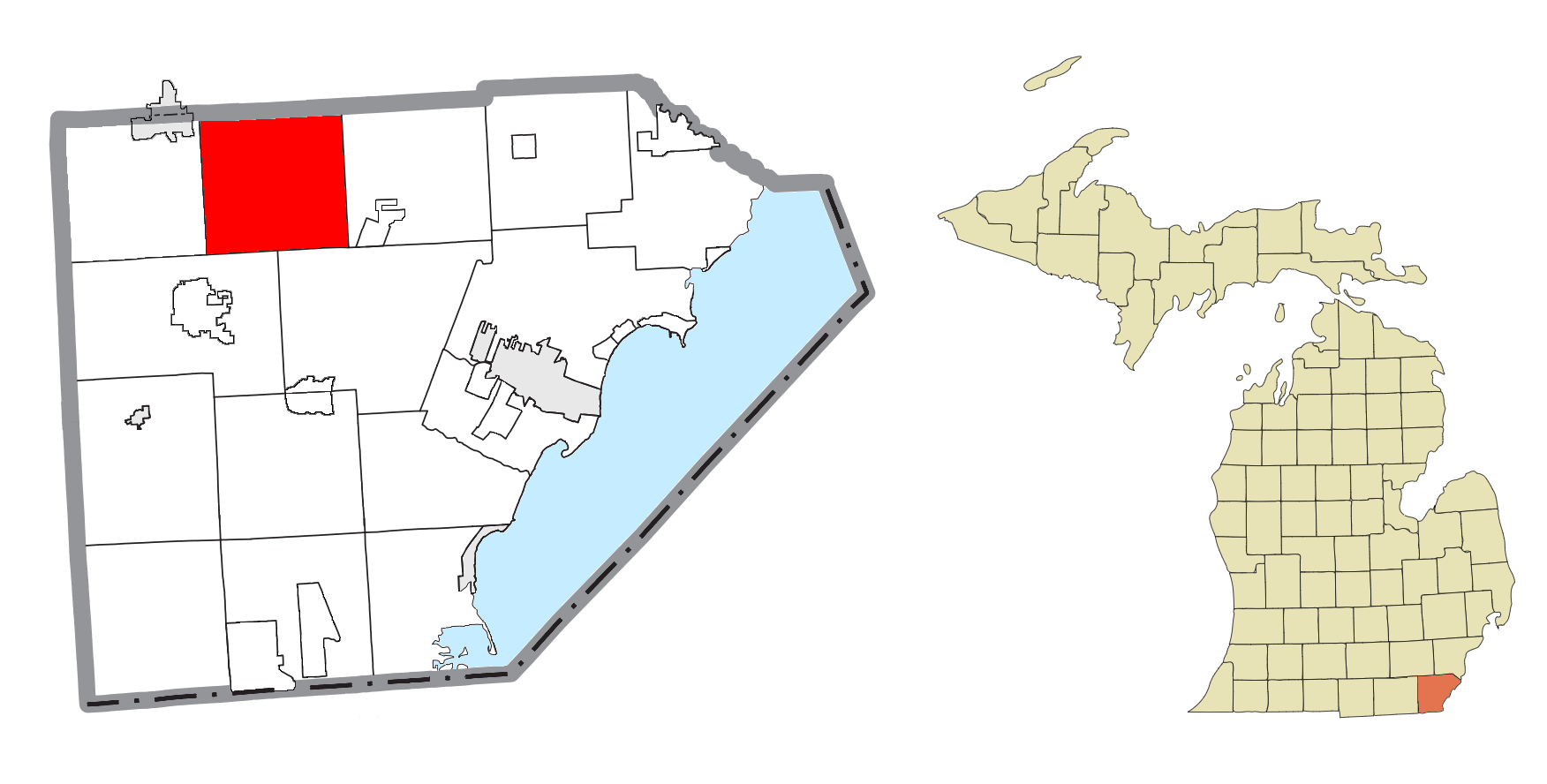
- Location within Monroe County and the state of Michigan

- Location within Michigan Location within the United States
- Coordinates: 42°01′48″N 83°35′31″W
- Country: United States
- State: Michigan
- County: Monroe
- Established: 1833

Government
  - Supervisor: Gary Taepke
  - Clerk: Kimberly Sharp

Area
  - Total: 35.87 sq mi (92.9 km^{2})
  - Land: 35.76 sq mi (92.6 km^{2})
  - Water: 0.11 sq mi (0.28 km^{2})
- Elevation: 663 ft (202 m)

Population (2020)
  - Total: 2,984
  - Density: 83.5/sq mi (32.2/km^{2})
- Time zone: UTC-5 (Eastern (EST))
  - Summer (DST): UTC-4 (EDT)
- ZIP Codes: 48159 (Maybee); 48160 (Milan); 48131 (Dundee); 48162 (Monroe); 48191 (Willis)
- Area code: 734
- FIPS code: 26-115-49180
- GNIS feature ID: 1626639
- Website: londontwpmi.gov

London Township is a civil township of Monroe County in the U.S. state of Michigan. The population was 2,984 at the 2020 census.

== History ==
London Township was established in 1833.

== Communities ==
- London is an unincorporated community located at 42°01′12″N 83°36′48″W. The community was settled with a post office on December 22, 1832, that remained in operation until February 15, 1905.
- Oakville is an unincorporated community in the northern portion of the township at 42°04′53″N 83°34′51″W. The community was first settled as early as 1831, and it received its first post office under the name Readingville on May 7, 1834. The post office was short-lived and closed on November 24, 1834. The Readingville post office reopened on May 2, 1835 and was renamed as Nelsonville on June 18, 1836. The name again changed to Oakville on January 3, 1837 and remained the same until it closed for the last time on February 29, 1904.

== Geography ==
London Township is in northern Monroe County, with its north border being the Washtenaw County line. The center of the township is 5 miles (8 km) southeast of Milan, 6 miles (10 km) northwest of Maybee, and 14 miles (23 km) northwest of Monroe, the county seat.

According to the United States Census Bureau, the township has a total area of 35.87 square miles (92.90 km^{2}), of which 35.76 square miles (92.62 km^{2}) are land and 0.11 square miles (0.28 km^{2}), or 0.31%, are water.

The mouth of Paint Creek is at the northern border of the township with Stony Creek.

== Demographics ==
Historical population
Census	Pop.	Note	%±
1850	626		—
1860	839		34.0%
1870	1,031		22.9%
1880	1,408		36.6%
1890	1,315		−6.6%
1900	1,271		−3.3%
1910	1,128		−11.3%
1920	1,032		−8.5%
1930	1,119		8.4%
1940	1,273		13.8%
1950	1,591		25.0%
1960	2,422		52.2%
1970	2,522		4.1%
1980	3,266		29.5%
1990	2,915		−10.7%
2000	3,024		3.7%
2010	3,048		0.8%
2020	2,984		−2.1%
U.S. Decennial Census

As of the census of 2000, there were 3,024 people, 1,009 households, and 809 families residing in the township. The population density was 84.7 inhabitants per square mile (32.7/km^{2}). There were 1,061 housing units at an average density of 29.7 per square mile (11.5/km^{2}). The racial makeup of the township was 84.95% White, 12.93% African American, 0.43% Native American, 0.03% Asian, 0.20% from other races, and 1.46% from two or more races. Hispanic or Latino of any race were 1.42% of the population.

There were 1,009 households, out of which 39.1% had children under the age of 18 living with them, 66.3% were married couples living together, 9.7% had a female householder with no husband present, and 19.8% were non-families. 15.9% of all households were made up of individuals, and 5.2% had someone living alone who was 65 years of age or older. The average household size was 3.00 and the average family size was 3.35.

In the township the population was spread out, with 29.6% under the age of 18, 7.4% from 18 to 24, 30.3% from 25 to 44, 24.3% from 45 to 64, and 8.4% who were 65 years of age or older. The median age was 35 years. For every 100 females, there were 109.4 males. For every 100 females age 18 and over, there were 105.7 males.

The median income for a household in the township was $56,250, and the median income for a family was $61,314. Males had a median income of $45,647 versus $27,316 for females. The per capita income for the township was $20,285. About 5.6% of families and 8.4% of the population were below the poverty line, including 11.1% of those under age 18 and 11.2% of those age 65 or over.

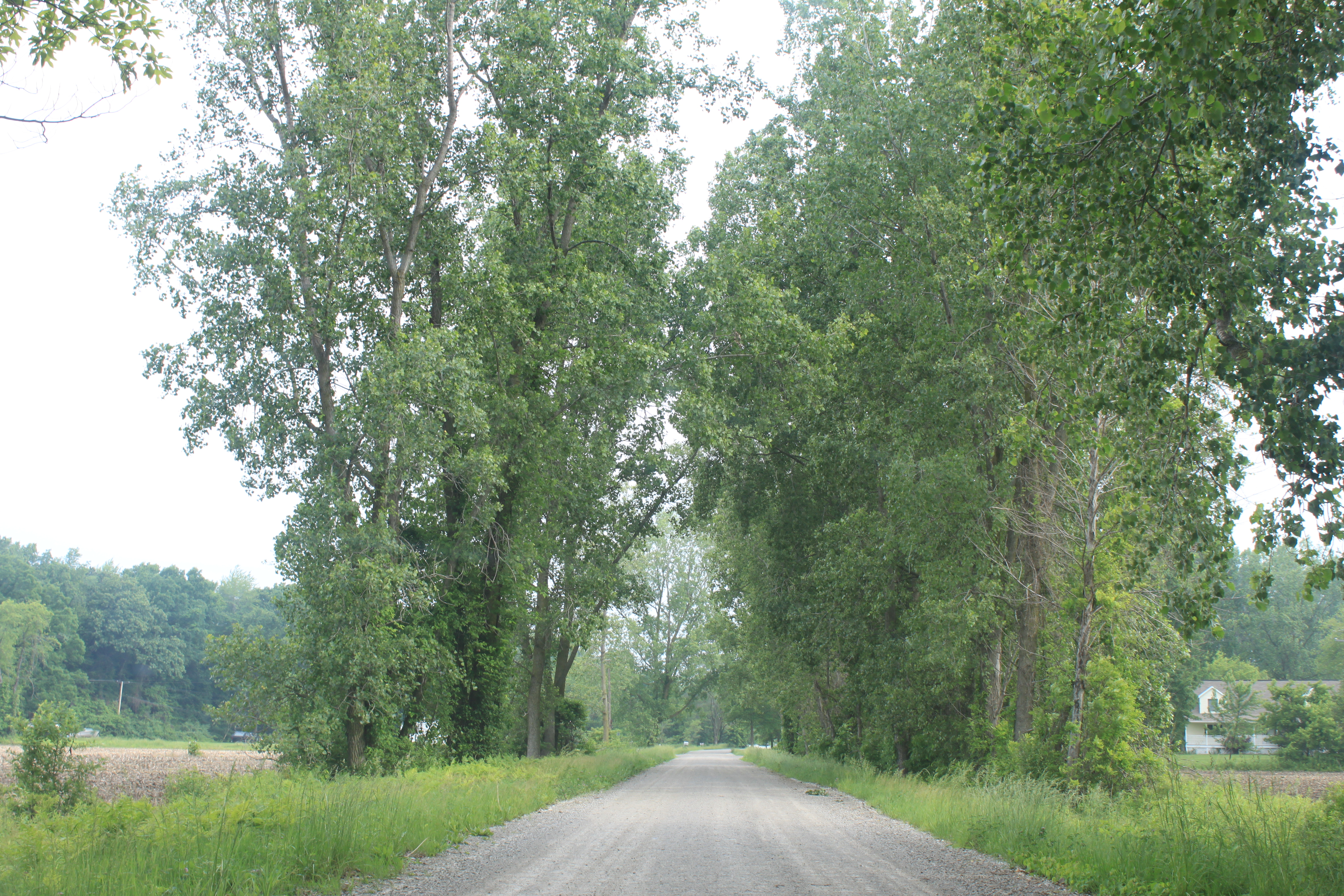
Tuttle Hill Road
