= Bridgewater Township, Michigan =

- Civil township
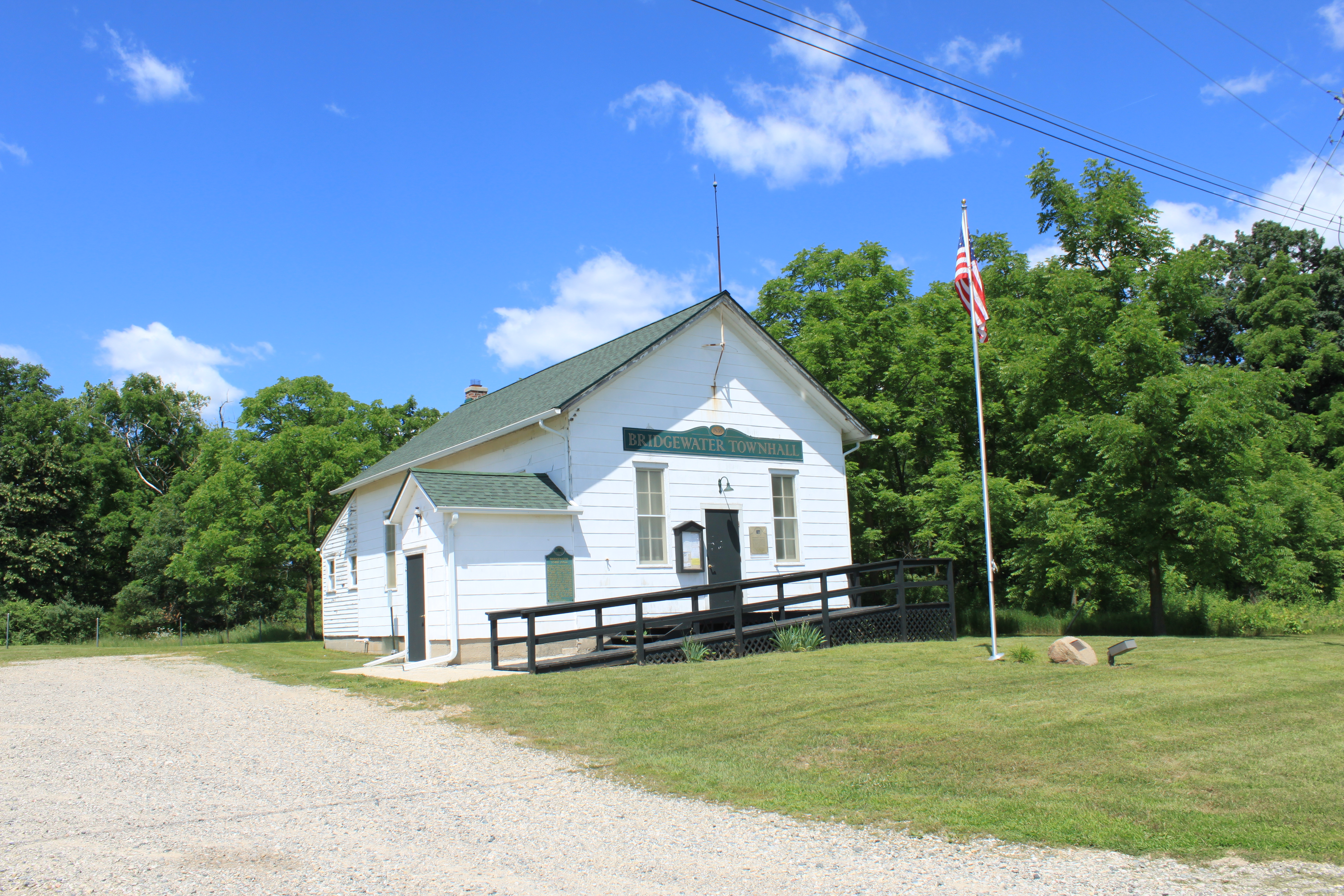
- Township Hall at Clinton and Braun Road

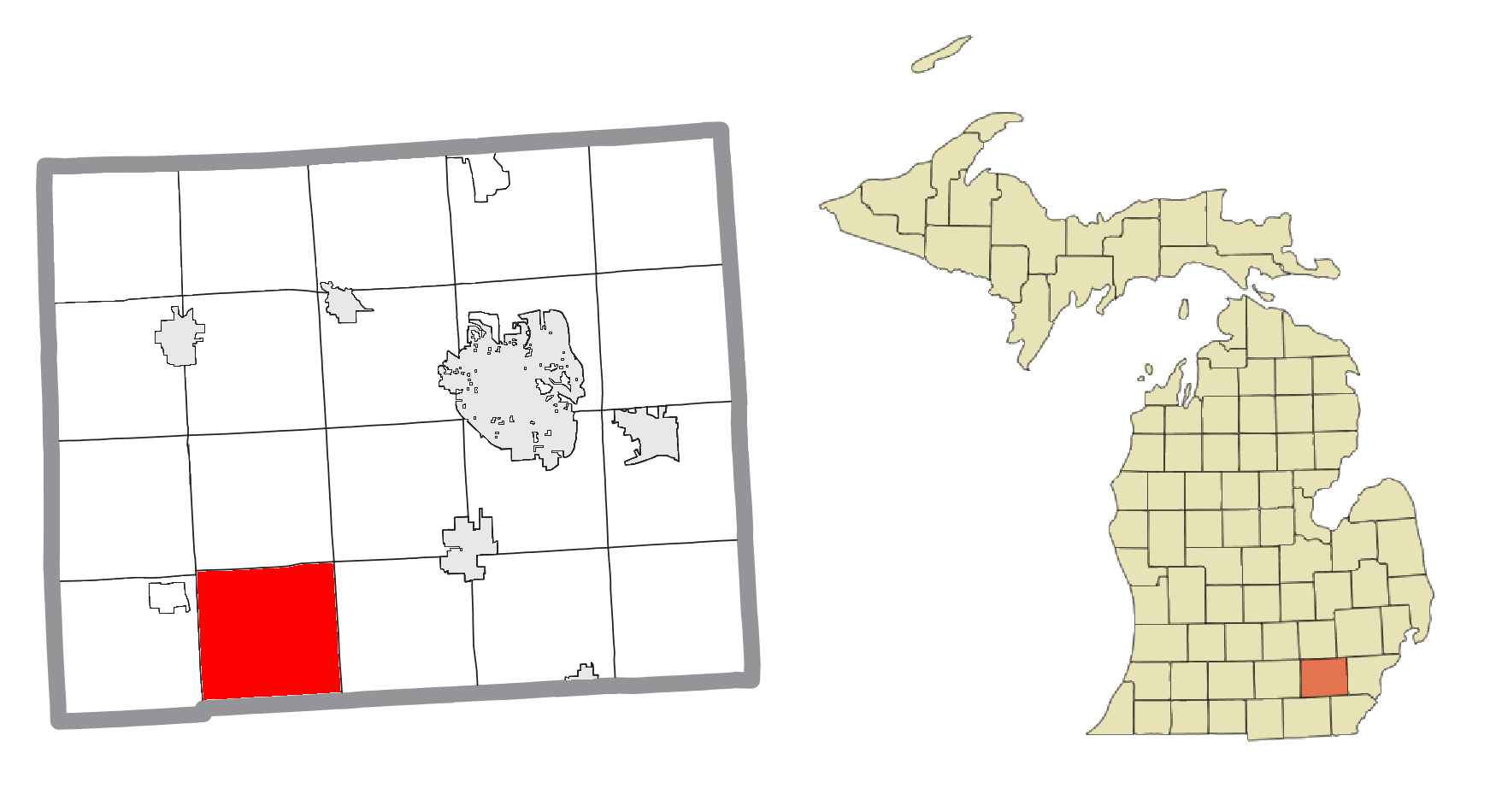
- Location within Washtenaw County

- Location within the state of Michigan
- Coordinates: 42°07′47″N 83°57′37″W
- Country: United States
- State: Michigan
- County: Washtenaw
- Established: 1833

Government
  - Supervisor: Laurie Fromhart
  - Clerk: Tom Wharam

Area
  - Total: 36.58 sq mi (94.74 km^{2})
  - Land: 36.16 sq mi (93.65 km^{2})
  - Water: 0.42 sq mi (1.09 km^{2})
- Elevation: 843 ft (257 m)

Population (2020)
  - Total: 1,615
  - Density: 44.66/sq mi (17.25/km^{2})
- Time zone: UTC-5 (Eastern (EST))
  - Summer (DST): UTC-4 (EDT)
- ZIP code(s): 48115 (Bridgewater); 48158 (Manchester); 48176 (Saline); 49236 (Clinton)
- Area code: 734
- FIPS code: 26-10560
- GNIS feature ID: 1625979
- Website: Official website

Bridgewater Town Hall
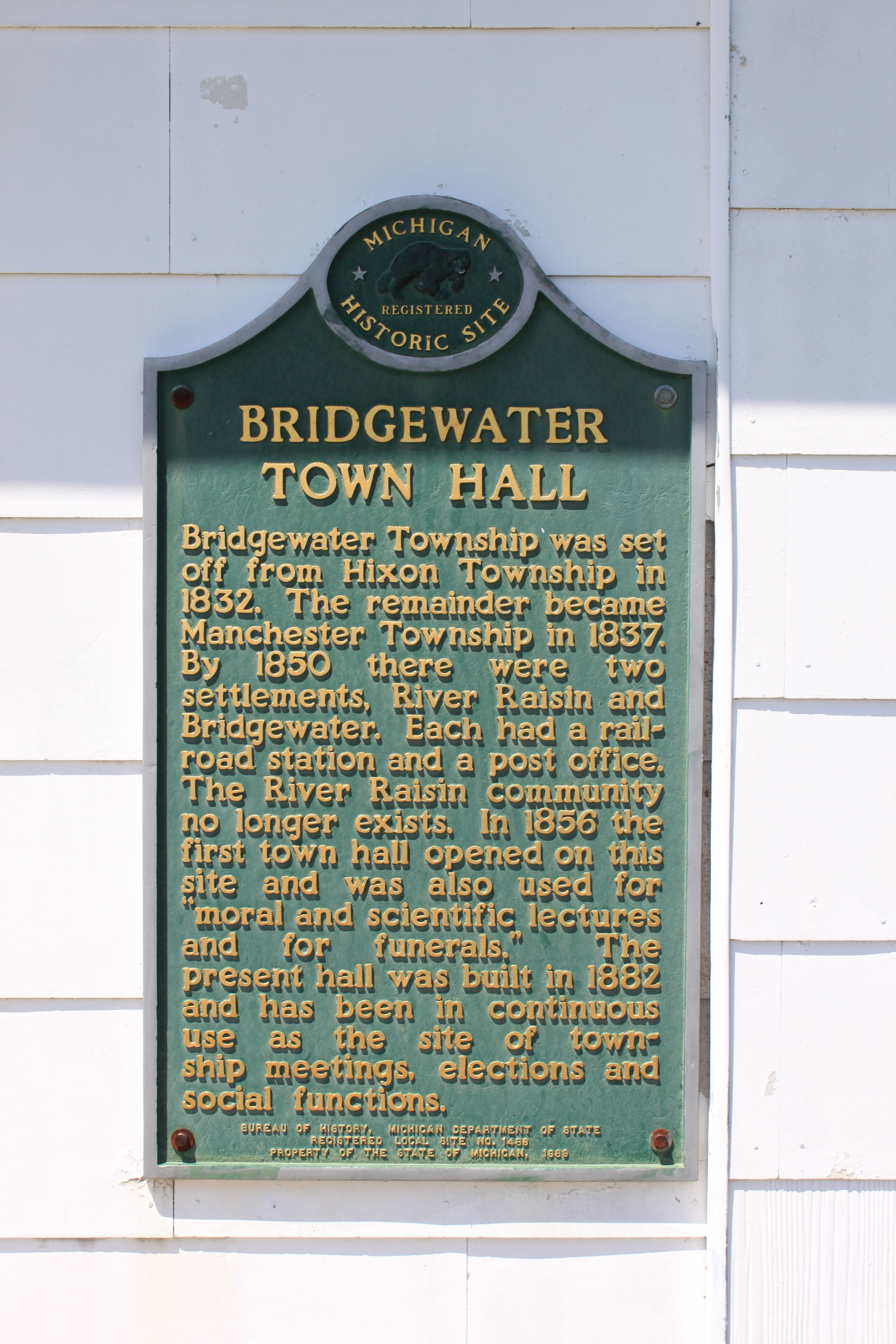
- Interactive map of Bridgewater Town Hall
- 42°07′21″N 83°58′04″W
- Location: 10990 Clinton Road; Manchester, Michigan

History
- Built: 1856; 1882 (rebuilt)

Michigan State Historic Site
- Designated: January 21, 1988

Bridgewater Township is a civil township of Washtenaw County in the U.S. state of Michigan. The population was 1,615 at the 2020 census.

== History ==
Bridgewater Township was organized in 1832. It was originally known as Hixon Township after one of it first settlers, Colonel Daniel Hixon. In 1833, it was renamed Bridgewater Township after Bridgewater, New York.

Originally, the township occupied the southwest corner of the county as well until Manchester Township was set aside from the western half of the Bridgewater Township in 1837. The first township hall was built in Bridgewater Township in 1856. The current township hall was rebuilt on the same site and is now a designated Michigan State Historic Site. By 1850, there were 2 towns, Bridgewater and River Raisin. River Raisin was located in section 20. It had a few mills, a train station, a post office, a store, and a few other businesses. The river raisin community no longer exists.

== Communities ==
- Bridgewater is an unincorporated community located within the township at 42°09′39″N 83°54′08″W. The community was first settled in 1829 by Col. Daniel Hixon. It was given a post office under the name Columbia Lake on April 3, 1833. The post office was renamed Bridgewater on May 8, 1843 after the township. It closed briefly from March 1, 1869 until it was restored on January 19, 1871 and has remained operating since.
- River Raisin is an unincorporated community located along the River Raisin within the township at 42°07′05″N 83°58′45″W. The community was established with a post office on May 7, 1864 and was named after river, which is the French word for grape. The post office operated until February 28, 1902.

== Geography ==
According to the U.S. Census Bureau, the township has a total area of 36.58 square miles (94.74 km^{2}), of which 36.16 square miles (93.65 km^{2}) is land and 0.42 square miles (1.09 km^{2}) (1.15%) is water.

The River Raisin runs through the western part of the township, while the Saline River has its headwaters in Joslin Lake in the northeast of the township.

=== Major highways ===
- US 12 (East Michigan Avenue) runs briefly through the southeast corner of the township.

== Demographics ==
As of the census of 2000, there were 1,646 people, 598 households, and 477 families residing in the township. The population density was 45.0 inhabitants per square mile (17.4/km^{2}). There were 615 housing units at an average density of 16.8 per square mile (6.5/km^{2}). The racial makeup of the township was 99.15% White, 0.12% African American, 0.12% Native American, 0.06% Asian, and 0.55% from two or more races. Hispanic or Latino of any race were 0.49% of the population.

There were 598 households, out of which 35.1% had children under the age of 18 living with them, 72.4% were married couples living together, 4.7% had a female householder with no husband present, and 20.2% were non-families. 14.5% of all households were made up of individuals, and 5.7% had someone living alone who was 65 years of age or older. The average household size was 2.75 and the average family size was 3.07.

In the township the population was spread out, with 25.2% under the age of 18, 5.1% from 18 to 24, 30.4% from 25 to 44, 29.4% from 45 to 64, and 9.9% who were 65 years of age or older. The median age was 40 years. For every 100 females, there were 103.0 males. For every 100 females age 18 and over, there were 99.7 males.

The median income for a household in the township was $68,011, and the median income for a family was $73,375. Males had a median income of $51,360 versus $29,875 for females. The per capita income for the township was $27,120. About 1.9% of families and 3.6% of the population were below the poverty line, including 3.2% of those under age 18 and 6.2% of those age 65 or over.

== Education ==
Bridgewater Township is served by three public school districts. The majority of the township is served by Clinton Community Schools to the south in Lenawee County. The northwestern portion of the township is served by Manchester Community Schools in Manchester. A small northeastern portion of the township is served by Saline Area Schools in Saline.

== Images ==
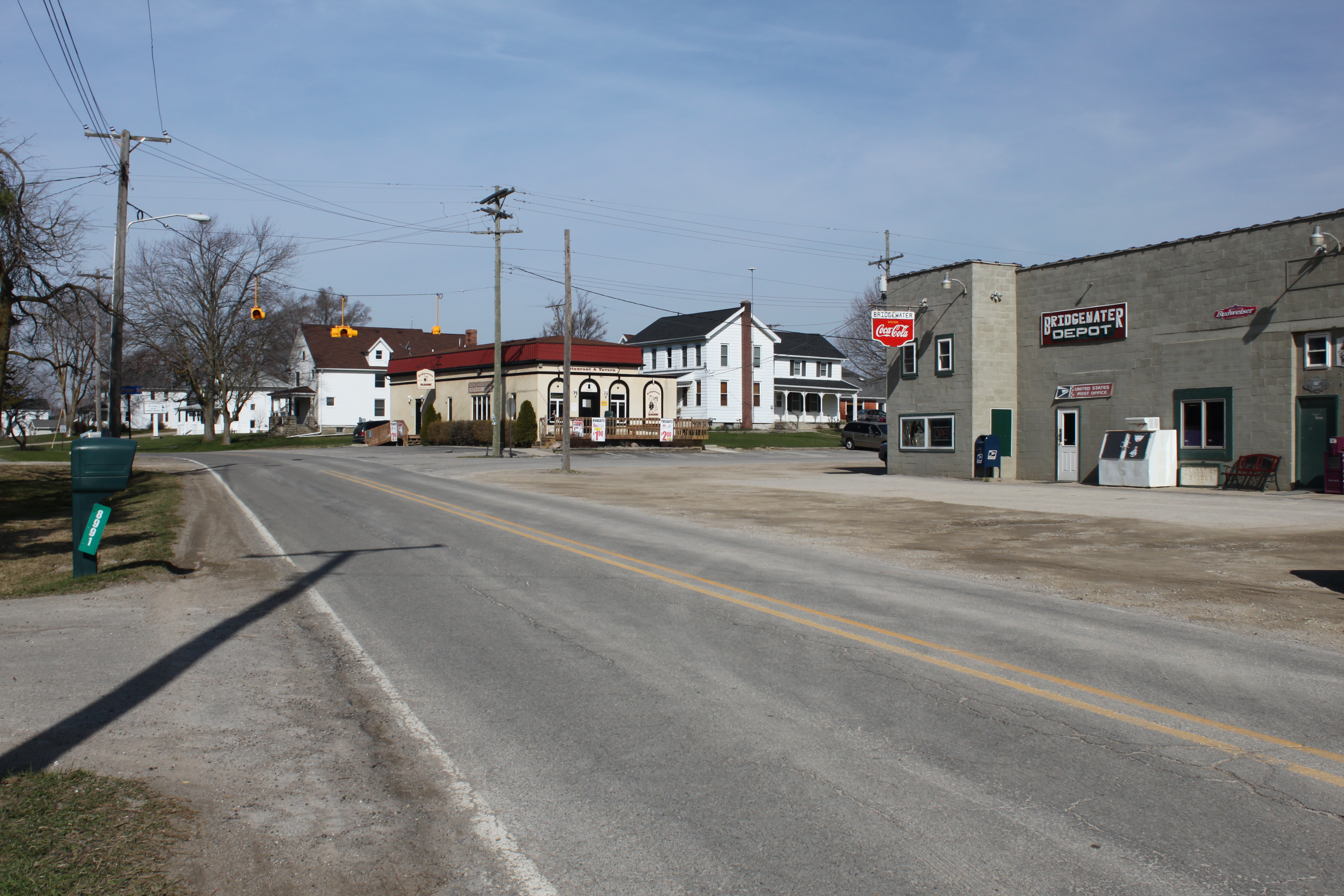
Unincorporated community of Bridgewater

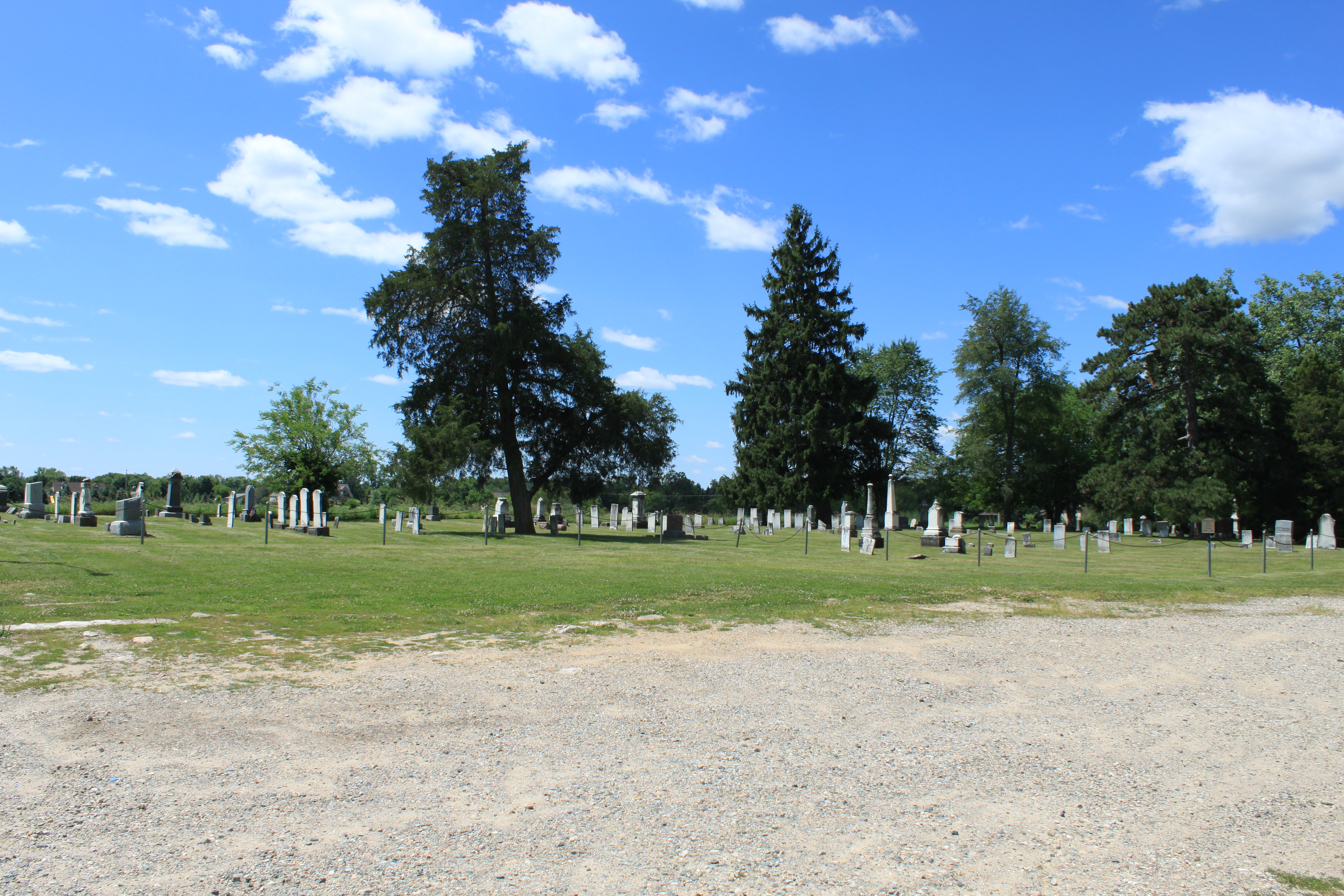
Bridgewater Township Cemetery

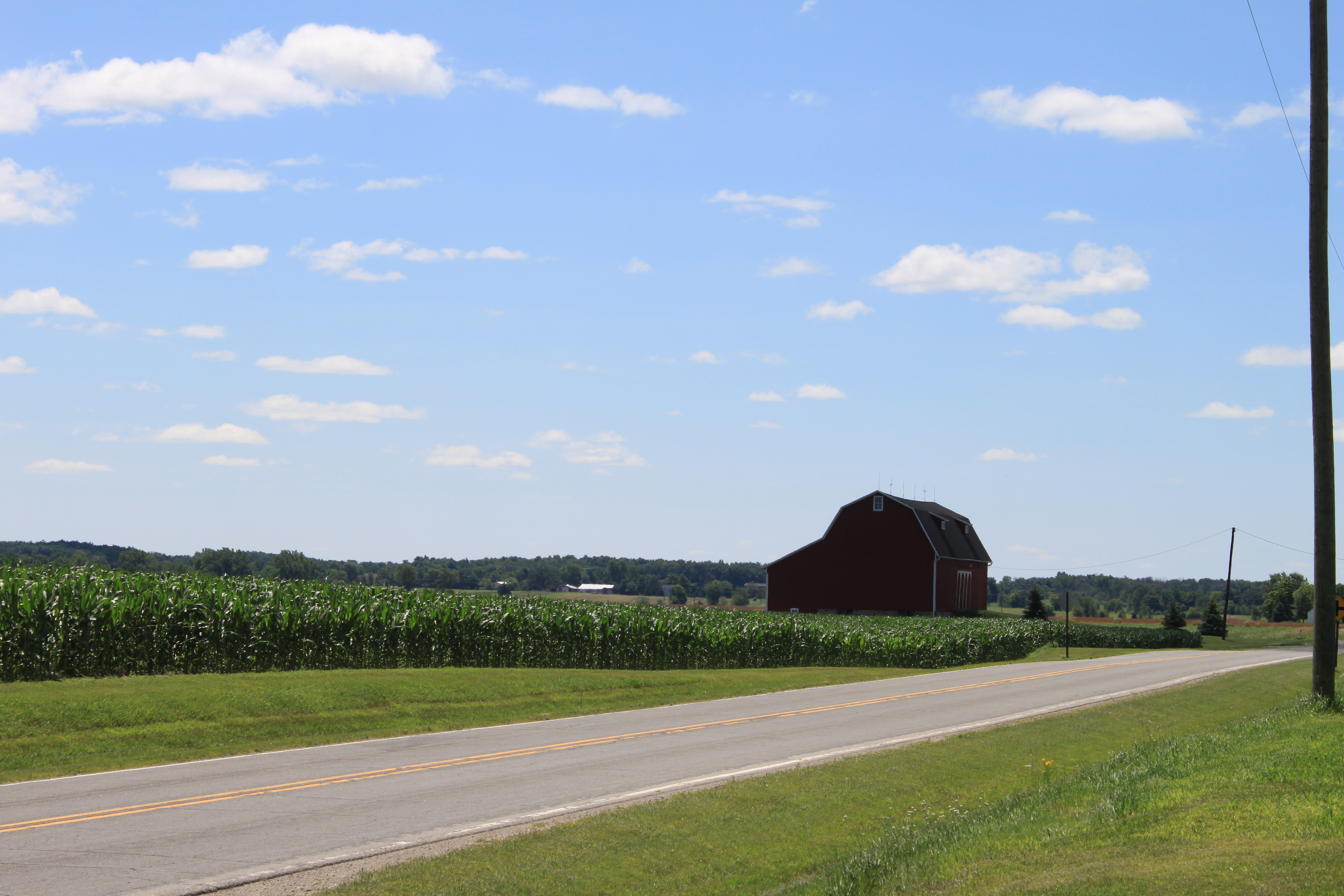
Cornfields along Clinton Road
