= Washtenaw County, Michigan =

County in Michigan, United States

- County
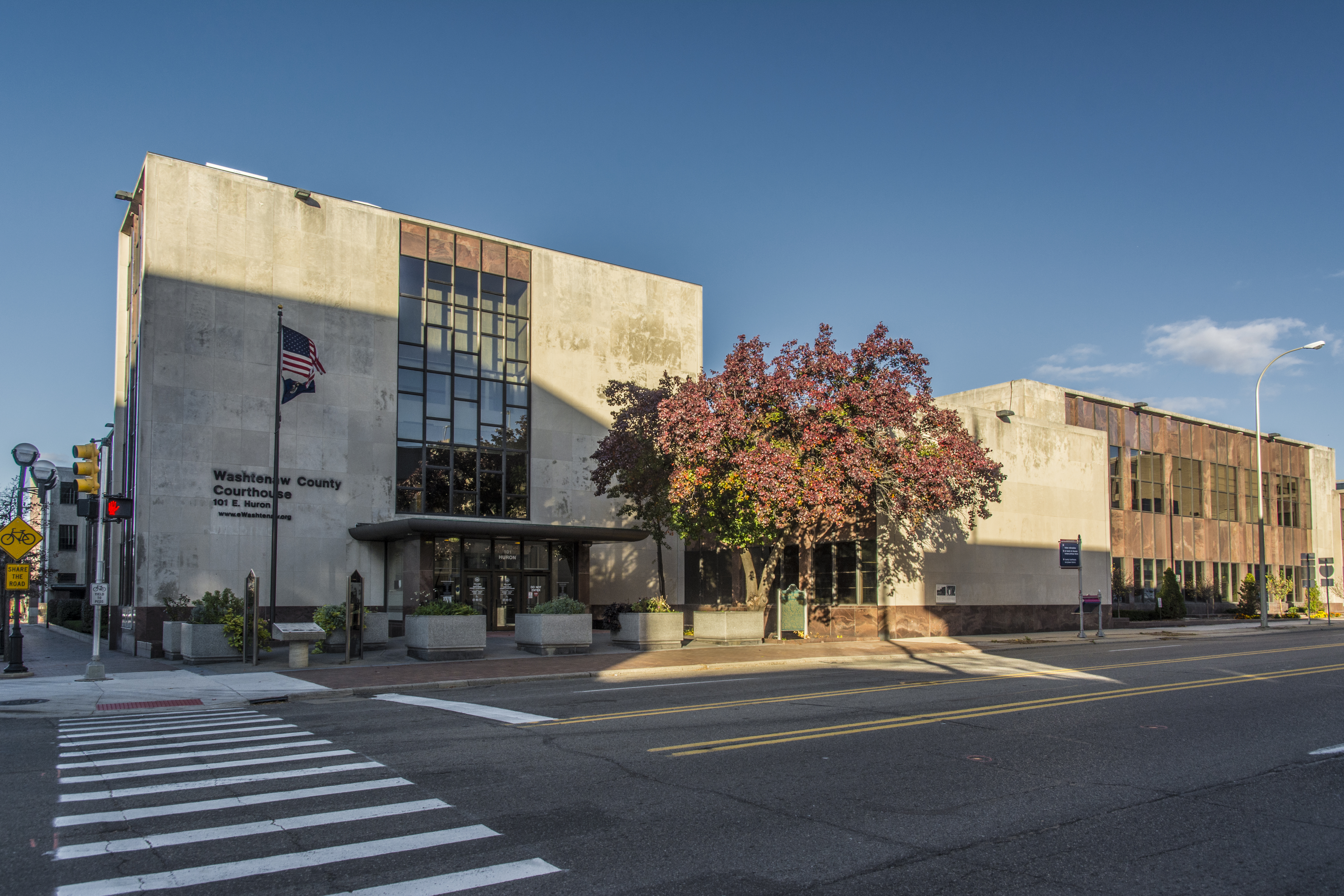
- Washtenaw County Courthouse

- Seal

- Location within the U.S. state of Michigan
- Coordinates: 42°15′N 83°50′W
- Country: United States
- State: Michigan
- Created: 1822; 204 years ago
- Organized: 1826
- Named for: O-wash-ta-nong ("far away water"), Ojibwe name for the Grand River
- Seat: Ann Arbor
- Largest city: Ann Arbor

Area
  - Total: 722 sq mi (1,870 km^{2})
  - Land: 706 sq mi (1,830 km^{2})
  - Water: 16 sq mi (41 km^{2}) 2.3%

Population (2020)
  - Total: 372,258
  - Estimate (2025): 370,214 ▼
  - Density: 527/sq mi (203/km^{2})
- Time zone: UTC−5 (Eastern)
  - Summer (DST): UTC−4 (EDT)
- Congressional district: 6th
- Website: washtenaw.org

Washtenaw County (/ˈwɔːʃtənɔː/ WAWSH-tə-naw) is a southern county in the U.S. state of Michigan. At the 2020 census, the population was 372,258. The county seat and the largest city in the county is Ann Arbor.

The county was authorized by legislation in 1822 and organized as a county in 1826. Washtenaw County comprises the Ann Arbor Metropolitan Statistical Area. The county is home to the University of Michigan, Eastern Michigan University, Washtenaw Community College, and Concordia University Ann Arbor.

== History ==
=== Native American territories ===
The first peoples occupying the central portion of what is now Michigan included: "the Pottawattamies, the Chippewas, the Ottawas, the Wyandottes and the Hurons". Native Americans whose territories included land within the Washtenaw County boundaries are shown to have included: Myaamia (Miami), Bodéwadmiké (Potawatomi), Anishinabewaki ᐊᓂᔑᓈᐯᐗᑭ, Peoria, Meškwahki·aša·hina (Meskwaki), and the Mississauga nation.

=== Etymology of Washtenaw ===
In the Ojibwe language, "Wash-ten-ong" or "Owashtanong" literally translates as "far away waters", and was then used by the Ojibwe as the name for the Grand River due to its great length. At the time of the official naming of the county in 1822, the headwaters of the Grand River fell within the original boundaries of Washtenaw County, which encompassed a much larger area than the present county.

=== Early colonization ===
The earliest histories mention French trappers and traders conducting trade in the area at the Potawatomi Trail and Pontiac Trail crossings of the Huron River, and later English then American settlers. The first successful settlement was established at the present site of Ypsilanti about 1809 by French traders.

In 1822, the Legislative Council of Michigan Territory government defined the name and boundaries of the county, but attached it to Wayne County for revenue, taxation and judicial affairs. Four years after the first platting out of the county, Washtenaw was established as a separate self-administered county by an act of the Michigan Territorial Legislature, in 1826. It was attached for administrative purposes to Wayne County until (before 1829) when county government was seated. Ingham and other counties were formed from portions of territorial Washtenaw County.

Swamps were drained to lower the water table. The swamp northwest of the I-94 and US-23 intersection, and areas within Waterloo Recreation Area still appear as they did to early settlers. As productive farms became established, the local deer herds grew. In the 1820s and 1830s, the events surrounding the independence of Greece from Turkey inspired construction of Greek Revival buildings, and the names of townships, towns, and children.

The "frostbitten convention" was held at Ann Arbor, the county seat, in 1835. Statehood was delayed because Michigan claimed the Toledo Strip, which was also claimed by Ohio. Following resolution of the Toledo War (1835–1836), in which Michigan Territory ceded its claim to Toledo in exchange for most of the Upper Peninsula (from the Porcupine Mountains eastward), Ohio withdrew its objection and Michigan became a state on January 26, 1837.

The convention also decided to move the capital from Detroit to a point further away from the Canadian border. After considering many existing communities, the delegates decided to build an entirely new capital city, which became Lansing. The University of Michigan, founded at Detroit in 1817, was moved to Ann Arbor in 1839 as a consolation for the city not being named the new state capital, as it had sought. The university subsequently became and remains Washtenaw County's largest employer.

In 1849, the Michigan State Normal School (now Eastern Michigan University) was established in Washtenaw's oldest settlement, Ypsilanti. It was elevated to collegiate status c. 1891 as Michigan State Normal College. The name was changed in 1956 to Eastern Michigan College, which was elevated to university status in 1959.

== Geography ==
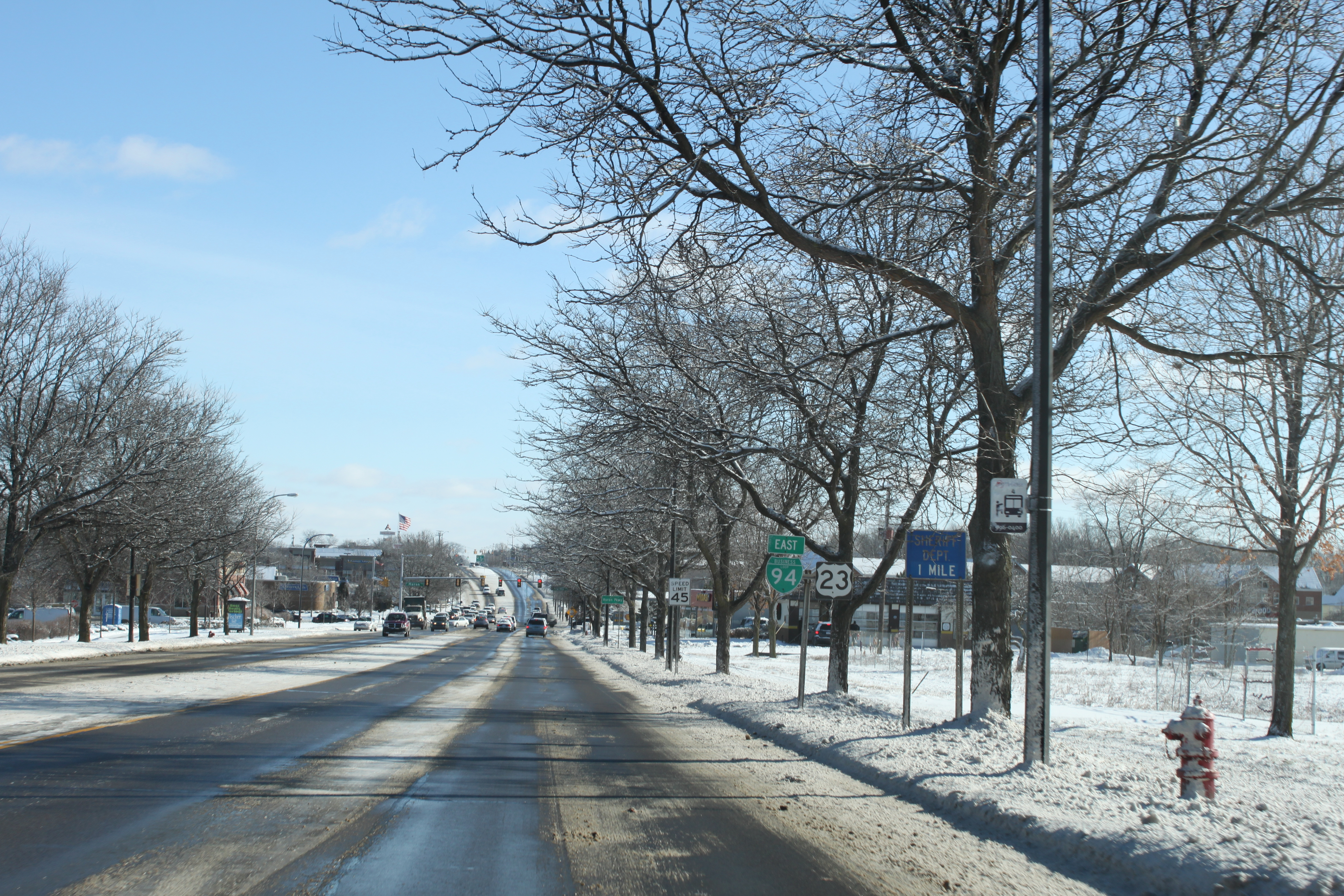
Business Loop Interstate 94/Business US Highway 23 (BL I-94/Bus. US 23, Washtenaw Avenue) in Ann Arbor

According to the U.S. Census Bureau, the county has a total area of 722 square miles (1,870 km^{2}), of which 706 square miles (1,830 km^{2}) is land and 16 square miles (41 km^{2}) (2.3%) is water.

=== Adjacent counties ===
- Livingston County (north)
- Oakland County (northeast)
- Wayne County (east)
- Monroe County (southeast)
- Lenawee County (southwest)
- Jackson County (west)
- Ingham County (northwest)

=== Major highways ===
- I-94
- BL I-94
- US 12 (Michigan Avenue, Chicago Road)
- Bus. US 12
- US 23
- Bus. US 23
- M-14
- M-17
- M-52
- M-153 (Ford Road)

== Demographics ==
Historical population
Census	Pop.	Note	%±
1830	4,042		—
1840	23,571		483.2%
1850	28,567		21.2%
1860	35,686		24.9%
1870	41,434		16.1%
1880	41,848		1.0%
1890	42,210		0.9%
1900	47,761		13.2%
1910	44,714		−6.4%
1920	49,520		10.7%
1930	65,530		32.3%
1940	80,810		23.3%
1950	134,606		66.6%
1960	172,440		28.1%
1970	234,103		35.8%
1980	264,748		13.1%
1990	282,937		6.9%
2000	322,895		14.1%
2010	344,791		6.8%
2020	372,258		8.0%
2025 (est.)	370,214	▼	−0.5%
U.S. Decennial Census; 1790–1960 1900–1990; 1990–2000 2010–2019

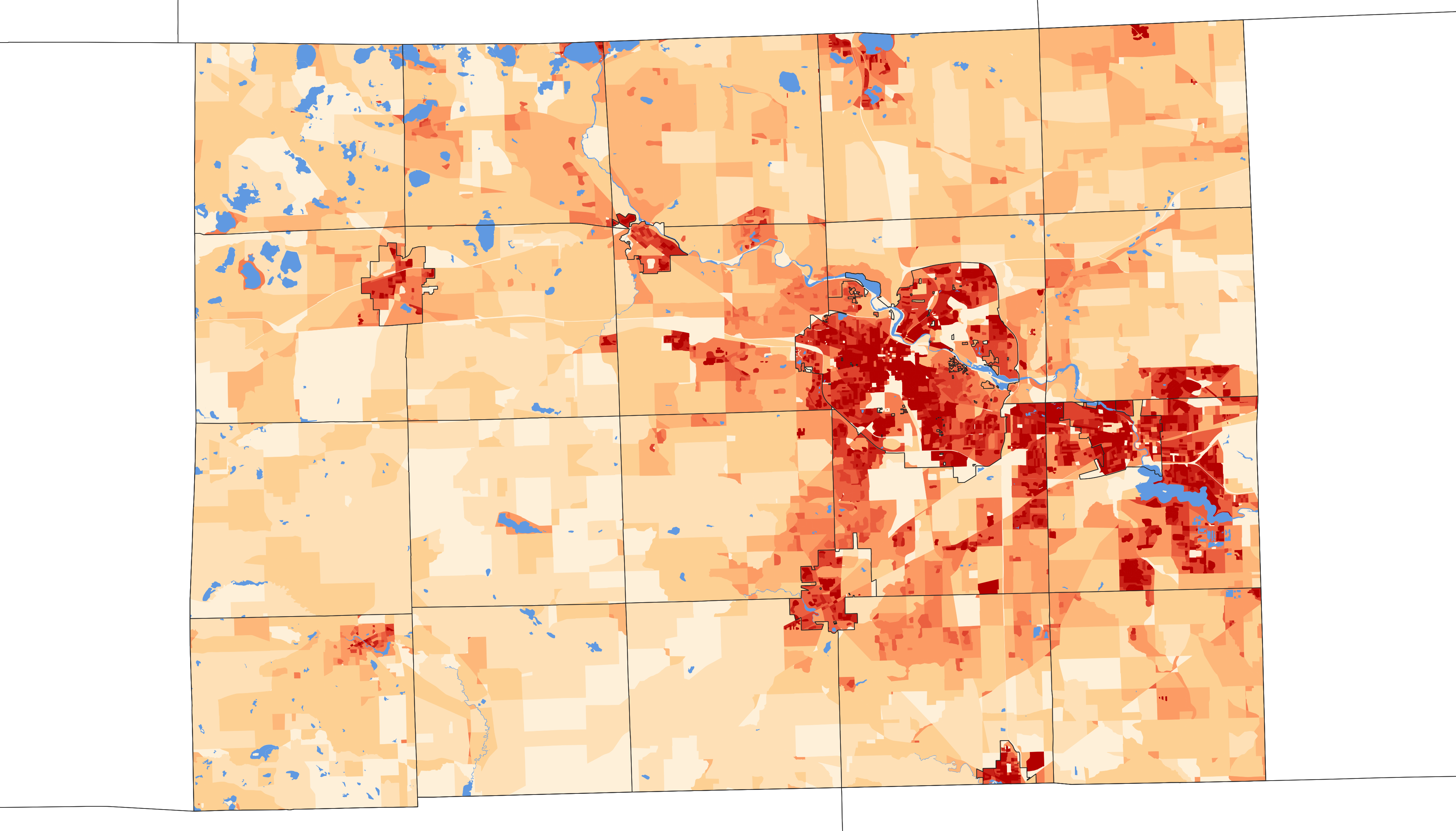
2020 population density of Washtenaw County MI by census block

=== Racial and ethnic composition ===
Washtenaw County, Michigan – Racial and ethnic composition Note: the US Census treats Hispanic/Latino as an ethnic category. This table excludes Latinos from the racial categories and assigns them to a separate category. Hispanics/Latinos may be of any race.
Race / Ethnicity (NH = Non-Hispanic)	Pop 1980	Pop 1990	Pop 2000	Pop 2010	Pop 2020	% 1980	% 1990	% 2000	% 2010	% 2020
White alone (NH)	224,512	232,938	245,033	248,675	252,220	84.80%	82.33%	75.89%	72.12%	67.75%
Black or African American alone (NH)	28,118	31,334	39,326	43,152	42,125	10.62%	11.07%	12.18%	12.52%	11.32%
Native American or Alaska Native alone (NH)	720	987	1,042	976	715	0.27%	0.35%	0.32%	0.28%	0.19%
Asian alone (NH)	5,631	11,598	20,270	27,005	33,517	2.13%	4.10%	6.28%	7.83%	9.00%
Native Hawaiian or Pacific Islander alone (NH)	x	x	107	118	183	x	x	0.03%	0.03%	0.05%
Other race alone (NH)	1,712	349	864	846	2,051	0.65%	0.12%	0.27%	0.25%	0.55%
Mixed race or Multiracial (NH)	x	x	7,414	10,159	20,716	x	x	2.30%	2.95%	5.56%
Hispanic or Latino (any race)	4,055	5,731	8,839	13,860	20,731	1.53%	2.03%	2.74%	4.02%	5.57%
Total	264,748	282,937	322,895	344,791	372,258	100.00%	100.00%	100.00%	100.00%	100.00%

=== 2020 census ===
As of the 2020 census, the county had a population of 372,258. The median age was 34.5 years. 18.4% of residents were under the age of 18 and 14.8% of residents were 65 years of age or older. For every 100 females there were 96.5 males, and for every 100 females age 18 and over there were 94.8 males age 18 and over.

The racial makeup of the county was 69.2% White, 11.5% Black or African American, 0.3% American Indian and Alaska Native, 9.0% Asian, 0.1% Native Hawaiian and Pacific Islander, 2.0% from some other race, and 7.9% from two or more races. Hispanic or Latino residents of any race comprised 5.6% of the population.

82.8% of residents lived in urban areas, while 17.2% lived in rural areas.

There were 147,847 households in the county, of which 25.0% had children under the age of 18 living in them. Of all households, 43.4% were married-couple households, 21.6% were households with a male householder and no spouse or partner present, and 28.2% were households with a female householder and no spouse or partner present. About 31.4% of all households were made up of individuals and 9.9% had someone living alone who was 65 years of age or older.

There were 156,882 housing units, of which 5.8% were vacant. Among occupied housing units, 60.3% were owner-occupied and 39.7% were renter-occupied. The homeowner vacancy rate was 1.1% and the rental vacancy rate was 5.7%.

=== Language and income data ===
83.4% spoke only English at home; 3.7% spoke Spanish and 12.9% spoke another language.

The median income for a household in the county was $83,754 and the median income for a family was $116,562. 15.3% of people were under the poverty line.

== Government ==
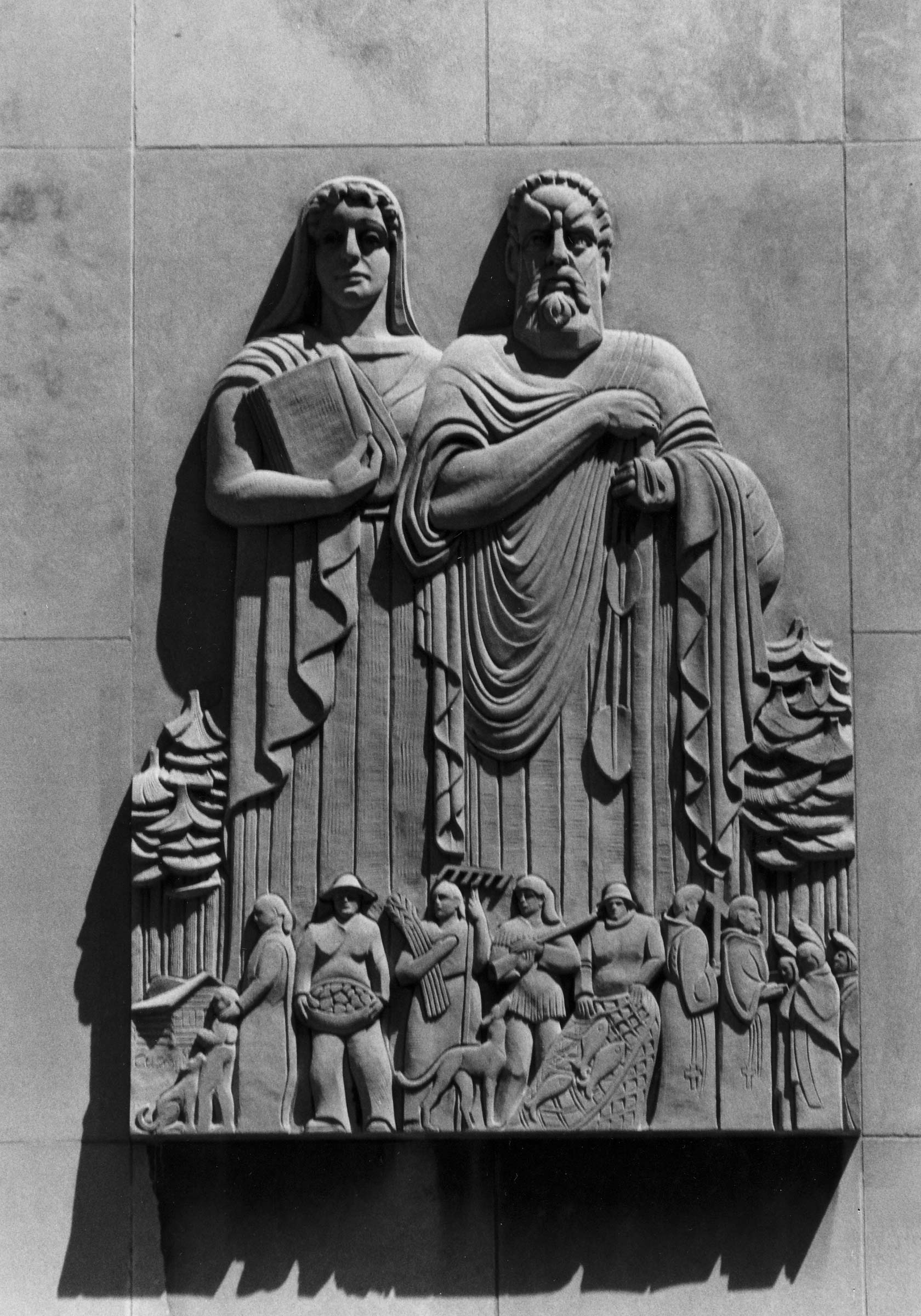
Washtenaw County Court House, sculpture by Carleton W. Angell

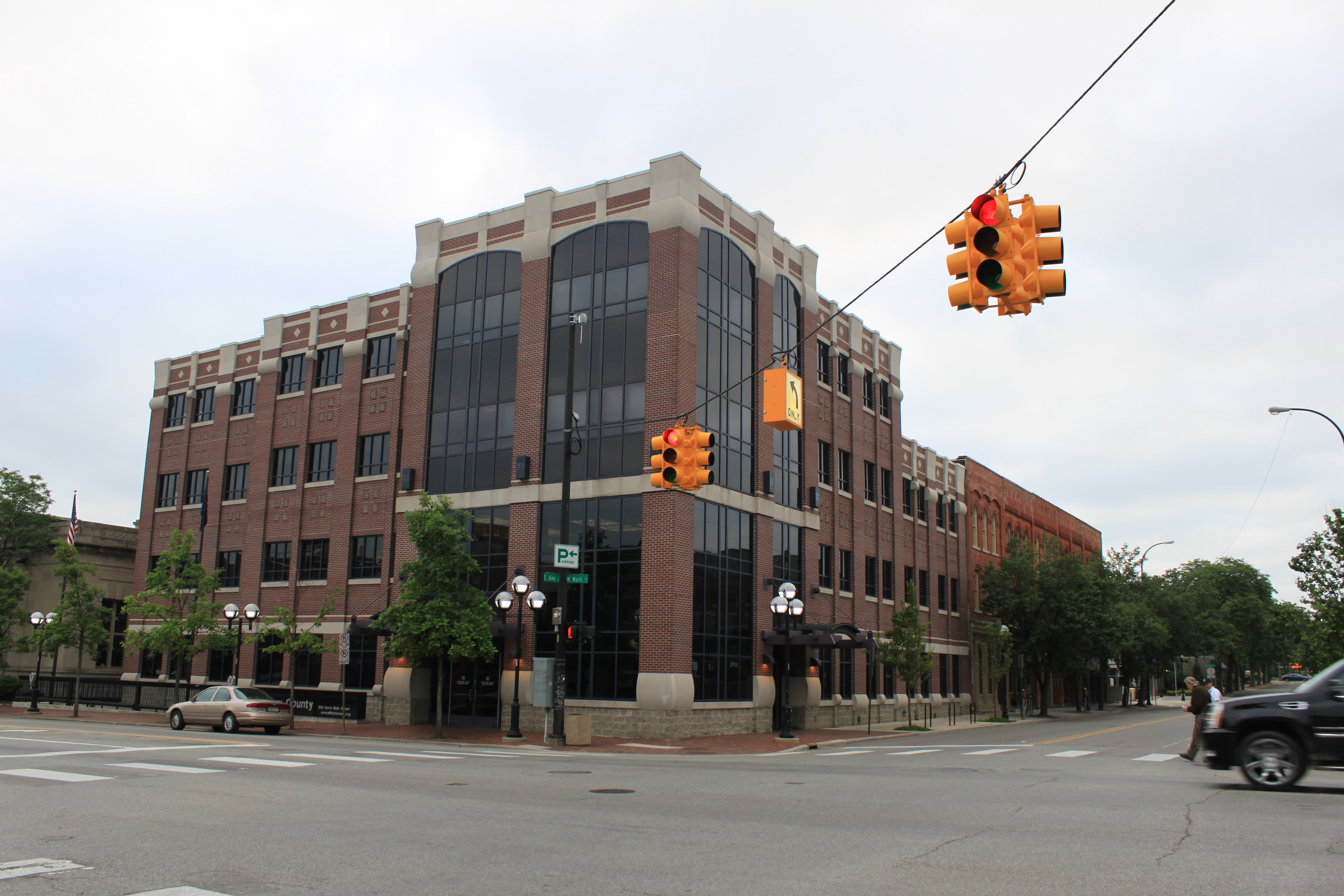
Washtenaw County Clerk building

=== Elected officials ===
- Prosecuting Attorney: Eli Savit (Democrat)
- Sheriff: Alyshia M. Dyer (Democrat)
- County Clerk/Register of Deeds: Lawrence Kestenbaum (Democrat)
- County Treasurer: Latitia Lamelle Sharp (Democrat)
- Water Resources Commissioner: Gretchen Driskell (Democrat)

The Board of Commissioners has nine members, elected from single member districts, on a partisan ballot, in November of even-numbered years. The term is two years. Information as of October 2024.

District	Commissioner	Party	Positions
1	Jason Maciejewski	Democrat	
2	Crystal Lyte	Democrat	
3	Shannon Beeman	Democrat	
4	Caroline Sanders	Democrat	Vice Chair of the Board
5	Justin Hodge	Democrat	Board Chair
6	Annie Sommerville	Democrat	Working Session Committee Chair
7	Andy LaBarre	Democrat	Vice Chair of the Working Session
8	Yousef Rabhi	Democrat	
9	Katie Scott	Democrat	

=== Government services ===
==== Parks and recreation ====
Washtenaw County operates 10 parks and one recreation center (gymnasium). One park has a water sprinkler area, one has a substantial water park component, and there is one golf course. The recreation center has a swimming pool, indoor track, basketball courts, complete set of resistance machines, a weight room, and several multipurpose rooms.

Washtenaw County is in the process of acquiring land for natural preservation. The program started in 2001, was renewed in 2010. The millage was renewed a second time in 2020 with a record high of 72% of votes supporting the renewal. Eight parcels of land had been purchased by July 2007. These parcels are of special ecological, recreational, and educational benefits. They are preserved in a natural unimproved state and are open to the public during daylight hours.

==== Wireless communication ====
In partnership with private enterprise, the county maintains a wireless network which is currently available to approximately 50% of county residents. This is the Wireless Washtenaw Project; its stated aim of this project is to provide wireless access to all county residents.

==== Miscellaneous ====
The county government operates the jail, maintains rural roads (through a largely independent road commission), operates the major local courts, records deeds and mortgages, maintains vital records, administers public health regulations, and participates with the state in providing welfare and social services. The county board of commissioners controls the budget and has limited authority to make laws or ordinances. In Michigan, most local government functions – police and fire, building and zoning, tax assessment, street maintenance, etc. – are the responsibility of individual cities and townships.

== Politics ==
United States presidential election results for Washtenaw County, Michigan
Year	Republican		Democratic		Third party(ies)	
Year	No.	%	No.	%	No.	%
1884	4,049	40.53%	5,315	53.20%	626	6.27%
1888	4,549	42.96%	5,482	51.78%	557	5.26%
1892	4,362	41.99%	5,508	53.02%	518	4.99%
1896	5,671	49.73%	5,348	46.90%	384	3.37%
1900	5,369	50.10%	5,072	47.33%	275	2.57%
1904	6,566	62.04%	3,779	35.71%	238	2.25%
1908	5,845	54.58%	4,441	41.47%	423	3.95%
1912	2,495	23.64%	4,164	39.45%	3,897	36.92%
1916	6,505	54.09%	5,279	43.90%	242	2.01%
1920	14,082	74.46%	4,468	23.63%	362	1.91%
1924	14,326	72.24%	3,603	18.17%	1,901	9.59%
1928	19,676	78.41%	5,308	21.15%	109	0.43%
1932	15,368	52.81%	12,552	43.13%	1,180	4.05%
1936	14,986	50.78%	13,589	46.05%	935	3.17%
1940	21,664	64.25%	11,802	35.00%	253	0.75%
1944	24,740	62.00%	14,922	37.39%	244	0.61%
1948	24,588	63.75%	12,721	32.98%	1,258	3.26%
1952	35,826	66.64%	17,671	32.87%	262	0.49%
1956	38,911	66.88%	19,124	32.87%	141	0.24%
1960	39,632	60.99%	25,129	38.67%	225	0.35%
1964	25,595	37.70%	42,089	62.00%	206	0.30%
1968	36,432	46.82%	33,073	42.50%	8,309	10.68%
1972	50,535	46.98%	55,350	51.45%	1,690	1.57%
1976	56,807	50.86%	50,917	45.59%	3,965	3.55%
1980	48,699	41.92%	51,013	43.91%	16,467	14.17%
1984	58,736	51.27%	55,084	48.08%	749	0.65%
1988	55,029	46.67%	61,799	52.41%	1,092	0.93%
1992	41,386	30.11%	73,325	53.34%	22,755	16.55%
1996	40,097	32.33%	73,106	58.94%	10,825	8.73%
2000	52,459	36.19%	86,647	59.78%	5,834	4.03%
2004	61,455	35.47%	109,953	63.46%	1,856	1.07%
2008	53,946	28.76%	130,578	69.62%	3,024	1.61%
2012	56,412	31.28%	120,890	67.04%	3,035	1.68%
2016	50,631	26.64%	128,483	67.59%	10,965	5.77%
2020	56,241	25.93%	157,136	72.44%	3,554	1.64%
2024	58,844	26.56%	157,152	70.94%	5,546	2.50%

United States Senate election results for Washtenaw County, Michigan1
Year	Republican		Democratic		Third party(ies)	
Year	No.	%	No.	%	No.	%
2024	58,207	26.57%	154,214	70.40%	6,648	3.03%

Michigan Gubernatorial election results for Washtenaw County
Year	Republican		Democratic		Third party(ies)	
Year	No.	%	No.	%	No.	%
2022	42,804	23.67%	135,904	75.15%	2,140	1.18%

Since 1988, when Michael Dukakis won it, the county has been a Democratic stronghold in local and national elections due to the presence of Ann Arbor and the University of Michigan. In the 2020 United States presidential election it gave 72.4% of the vote to Democratic nominee Joe Biden, the highest margin for a Democrat in the county, the third-highest for any candidate in the county's history, and the highest in the state at the time as well. Between 1960 and 1988 it was generally a swing county: 1992 marked the first time that the county supported the same party as in the previous election since 1960.

Despite its modern-day Democratic strength, it was reliably Republican at the presidential level from 1896 to 1960, only voting Democratic once in that span in 1912 when the Republican vote was split. It was one of the few counties where Franklin D. Roosevelt was shut out in all four of his successful campaigns. George McGovern's win over Richard Nixon in the county in 1972 despite the latter winning nationally by a landslide was a sign of the county's shift towards supporting the Democratic Party, though Michigander and former Wolverine Gerald R. Ford won it in 1976 and Ronald Reagan won it in 1984 amid his national landslide, being the most recent Republican to win the county.

== Economy ==
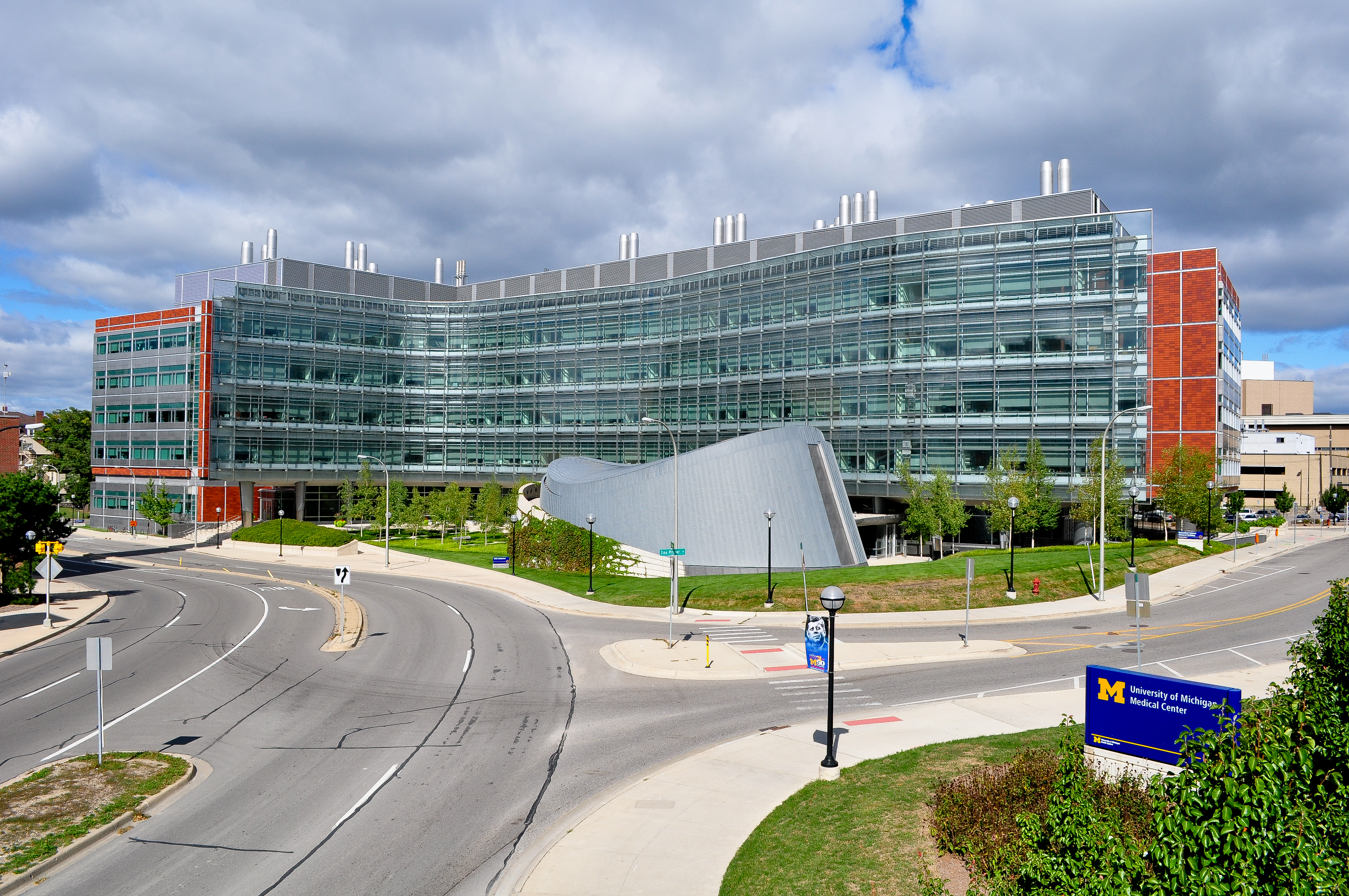
A. Alfred Taubman Biomedical Science Research Building at the University of Michigan's medical school

The largest employers in Washtenaw County, as of July 2020, are:

#	Employer	# of full-time employees
1	University of Michigan	35,446
2	Trinity Health	7,435
3	United States Federal government	3,060
4	Ann Arbor Public Schools	2,607
5	Toyota Technical Center	2,295
6	Faurecia North America	2,178
7	Eastern Michigan University	1,559
8	IHA Health Services	1,442
9	State of Michigan	1,409
10	Washtenaw County	1,264
11	Thomson Reuters	1,155
12	Domino's Pizza	812
13	City of Ann Arbor	712
14	Ford Motor Company	700
15	NSF International	693
16	US Postal Service	650
17	Washtenaw Community College	597
18	DTE Energy	568
19	Ypsilanti Community Schools	550

== Communities ==
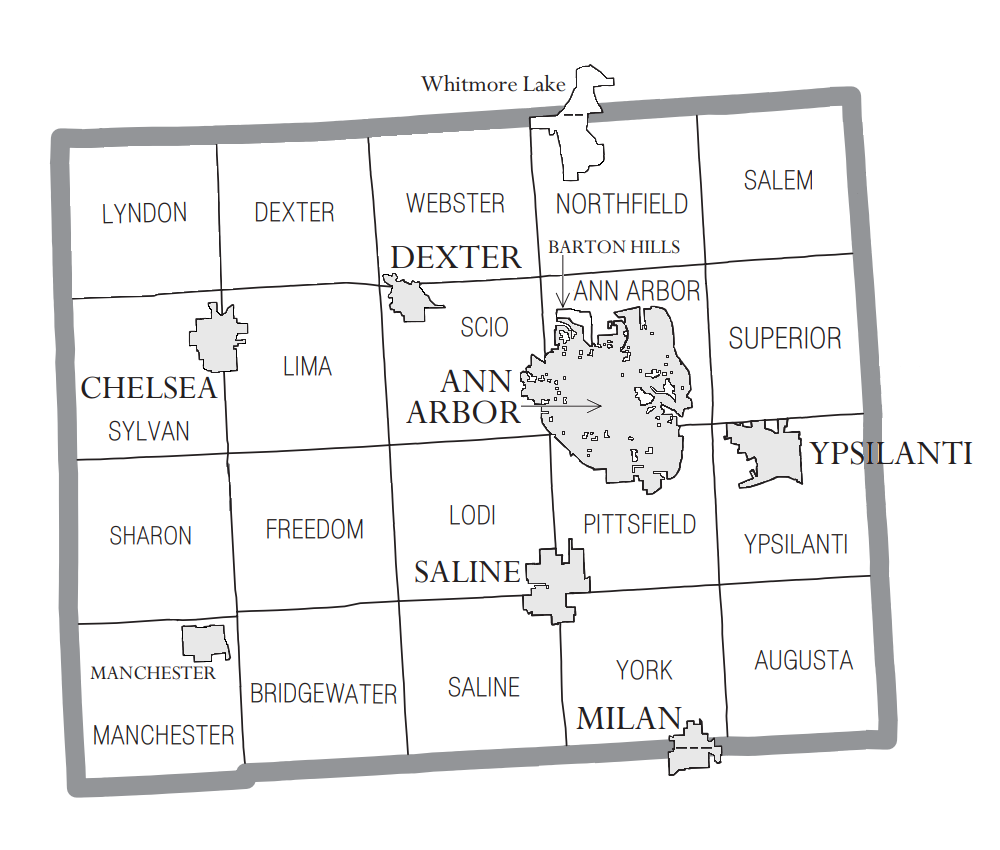
U.S. census data map showing local municipal boundaries within Washtenaw County, as well as the Whitmore Lake CDP. Shaded areas represent incorporated cities.

=== Cities ===
- Ann Arbor (county seat)
- Chelsea
- Dexter
- Manchester
- Milan (northern part; southern part is in Monroe County)
- Saline
- Ypsilanti

=== Village ===
- Barton Hills

=== Charter townships ===
- Ann Arbor Charter Township
- Augusta Charter Township
- Pittsfield Charter Township
- Superior Charter Township
- York Charter Township
- Ypsilanti Charter Township

=== Civil townships ===
- Bridgewater Township
- Dexter Township
- Freedom Township
- Lima Township
- Lodi Township
- Lyndon Township
- Manchester Township
- Northfield Township
- Salem Township
- Saline Township
- Scio Township
- Sharon Township
- Sylvan Township
- Webster Township

=== Census-designated place ===
- Whitmore Lake (partly in Washtenaw County and partly in Livingston County)

=== Other unincorporated communities ===
- Bridgewater
- Dixboro
- Delhi Mills
- Geddes
- Mooreville
- Paint Creek
- Salem
- Stony Creek
- Whittaker
- Willis

=== Ghost town ===
- Rawsonville (partial)

== Education ==
School districts include:

- Ann Arbor Public Schools
- Columbia School District
- Chelsea School District
- Clinton Community Schools
- Dexter Community Schools
- Grass Lake Community Schools
- Lincoln Consolidated School District
- Manchester Community Schools
- Milan Area Schools
- Northville Public Schools
- Pinckney Community Schools
- Plymouth-Canton Community Schools
- Saline Area Schools
- South Lyon Community Schools
- Stockbridge Community Schools
- Van Buren Public Schools
- Whitmore Lake Public Schools
- Ypsilanti Community Schools

Former school districts:

- Ypsilanti Public School District
- Willow Run Community Schools

== See also ==
- List of Michigan State Historic Sites in Washtenaw County
- National Register of Historic Places listings in Washtenaw County, Michigan
- USS Washtenaw County (LST-1166)

== Sources ==
- Chapman, Chas. C. (1881). History Of Washtenaw County, Michigan: Together With Sketches Of Its Cities, Villages And Townships...and Biographies Of Representative Citizens: History Of Michigan, Volume 1. Chas. C. Chapman & Co. pp. 1412–1413.
