= Freedom Township, Michigan =

- Civil township
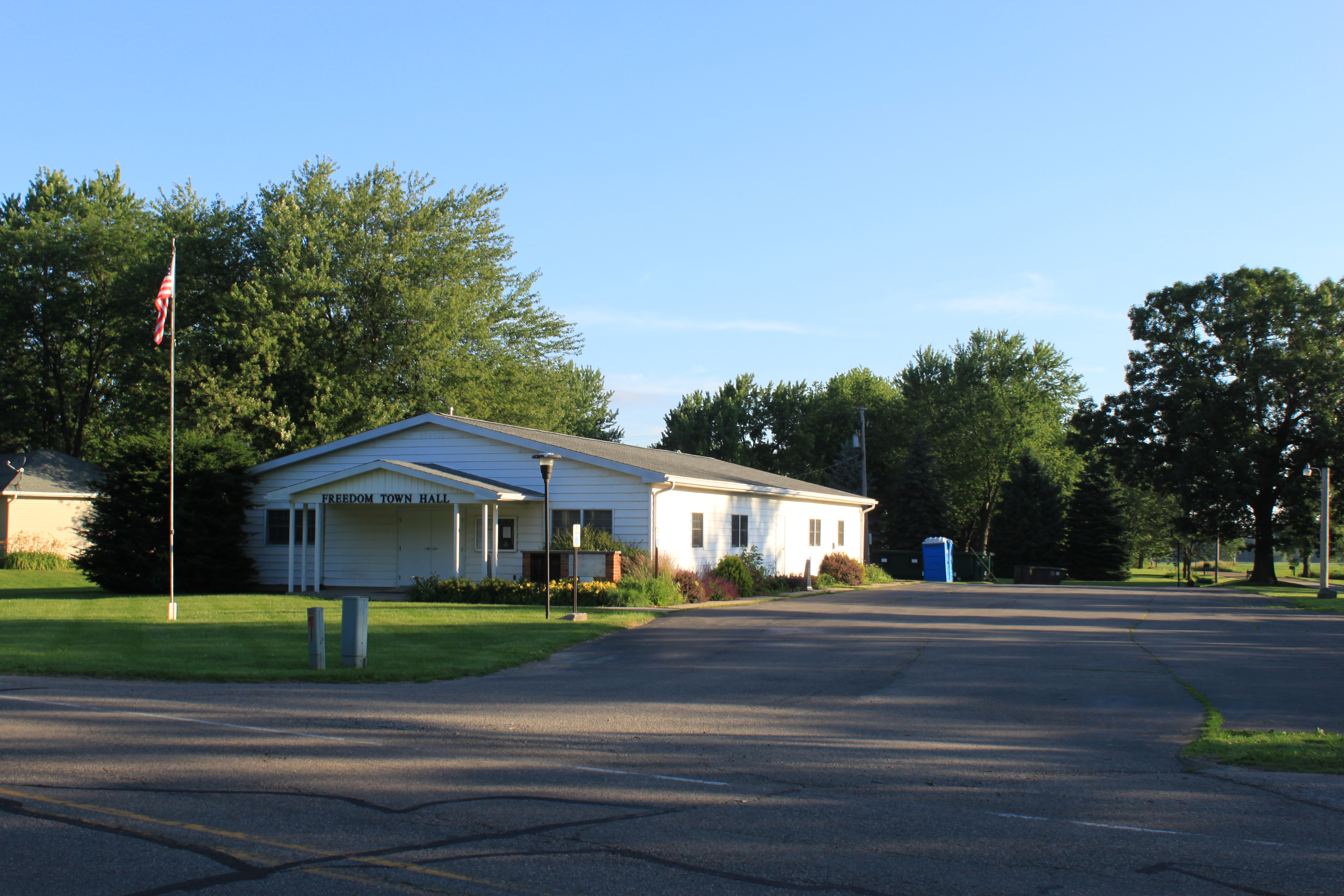
- Township Hall on Pleasant Lake Road

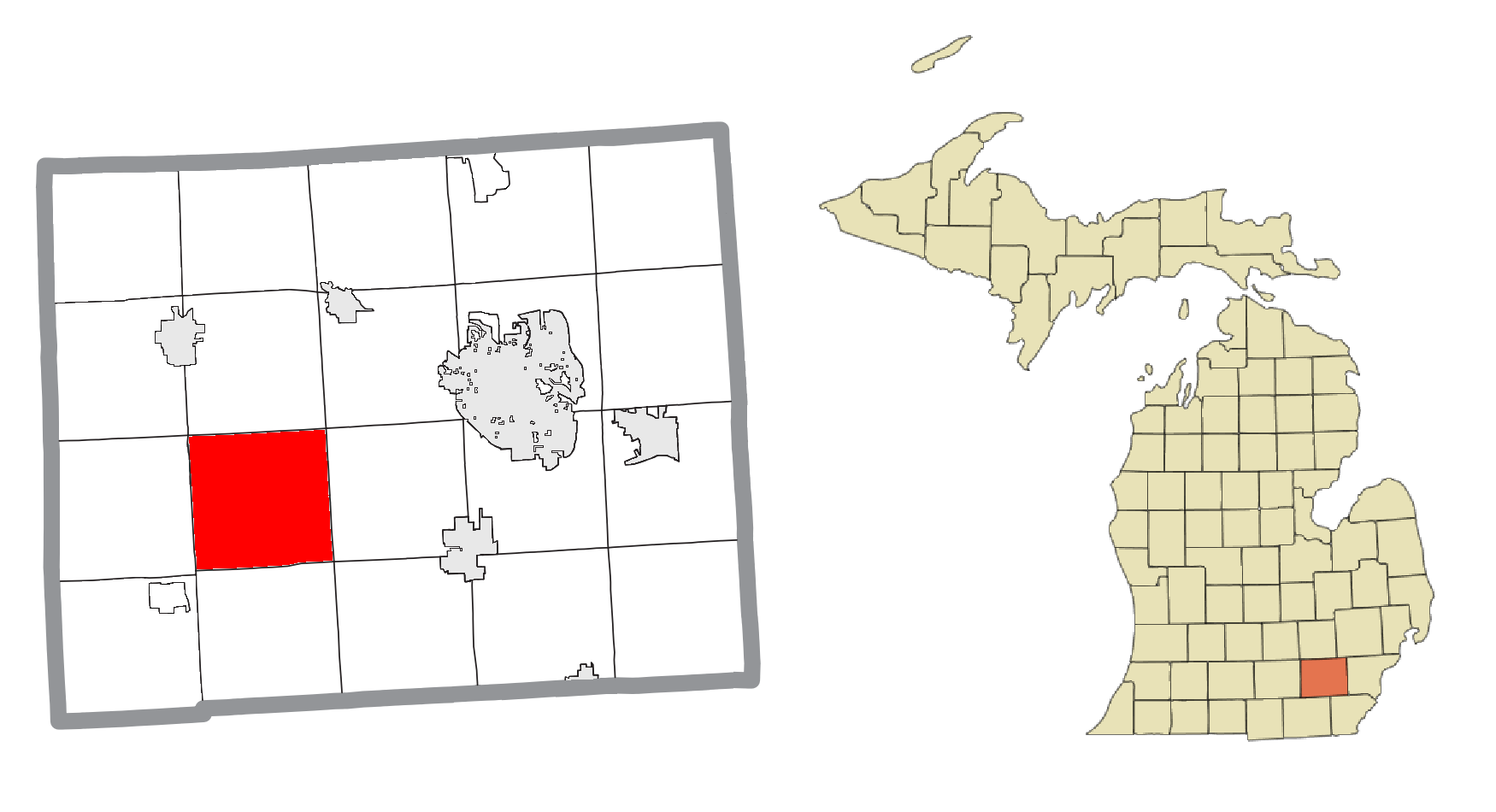
- Location within Washtenaw County

- Location within the state of Michigan Location within the United States
- Coordinates: 42°12′51″N 83°56′39″W
- Country: United States
- State: Michigan
- County: Washtenaw
- Established: 1834

Government
  - Supervisor: Dale Weidmayer
  - Clerk: Valisa Bristle

Area
  - Total: 35.85 sq mi (92.85 km^{2})
  - Land: 35.46 sq mi (91.84 km^{2})
  - Water: 0.39 sq mi (1.01 km^{2})
- Elevation: 974 ft (297 m)

Population (2020)
  - Total: 1,332
  - Density: 37.56/sq mi (14.50/km^{2})
- Time zone: UTC-5 (Eastern (EST))
  - Summer (DST): UTC-4 (EDT)
- ZIP code(s): 48103 (Ann Arbor); 48118 (Chelsea); 48158 (Manchester); 48176 (Saline)
- Area code: 734
- FIPS code: 26-30520
- GNIS feature ID: 1626313
- Website: Official website

Freedom Township is a civil township of Washtenaw County in the U.S. state of Michigan. The population was 1,332 at the 2020 census.

== Communities ==
- Eckert is a historic community within the township and was named for local grocer Frederick Eckert. The community had a rural post office October 7, 1893 until August 31, 1901.
- Fredonia is a former settlement in the center of the township. It had a rural post office from July 11, 1838, until July 31, 1901.
- Freedom is a historic community that is located within township. James Hill settled in the area in 1831, and a town meeting was first held here when Freedom Township was organized in 1834. A post office named Freedom operated briefly from May 21, 1867, until March 27, 1869.
- Rogers Corner is an unincorporated community located within the township at the intersection of Waters Road and South Fletcher Road at 42°14′21″N 83°58′27″W.

== Geography ==
According to the U.S. Census Bureau, the township has a total area of 35.85 square miles (92.85 km^{2}), of which 35.46 square miles (91.84 km^{2}) is land and 0.39 square miles (1.01 km^{2}) (1.09%) is water.

The largest body of water in the township is Pleasant Lake.

== Demographics ==
As of the census of 2000, there were 1,562 people, 561 households, and 417 families residing in the township. The population density was 44.0 inhabitants per square mile (17.0/km^{2}). There were 612 housing units at an average density of 17.3 per square mile (6.7/km^{2}). The racial makeup of the township was 93.15% White, 0.26% Native American, 0.38% Asian, 5.31% from other races, and 0.90% from two or more races. Hispanic or Latino of any race were 8.77% of the population.

There were 561 households, out of which 31.6% had children under the age of 18 living with them, 67.4% were married couples living together, 3.7% had a female householder with no husband present, and 25.5% were non-families. 20.1% of all households were made up of individuals, and 5.3% had someone living alone who was 65 years of age or older. The average household size was 2.57 and the average family size was 2.96.

The township's population was spread out, with 26.4% under the age of 18, 5.4% from 18 to 24, 28.4% from 25 to 44, 30.5% from 45 to 64, and 9.3% who were 65 years of age or older. The median age was 40 years. For every 100 females, there were 107.4 males. For every 100 females age 18 and over, there were 103.2 males.

The median income for a household in the township was $62,321, and the median income for a family was $73,235. Males had a median income of $45,139 versus $37,188 for females. The per capita income for the township was $26,397. About 1.2% of families and 5.2% of the population were below the poverty line, including 1.1% of those under age 18 and 3.9% of those age 65 or over.

== Education ==
Freedom Township is served by four public school districts. The majority of the township is served by Manchester Community Schools to the southwest in Manchester. The northwest portion of the township is served by Chelsea School District in Chelsea. A small eastern portion of the township is served by Saline Area Schools in Saline, and a very small portion in the northeast corner is served by Dexter Community School District in Dexter.

== Gallery ==
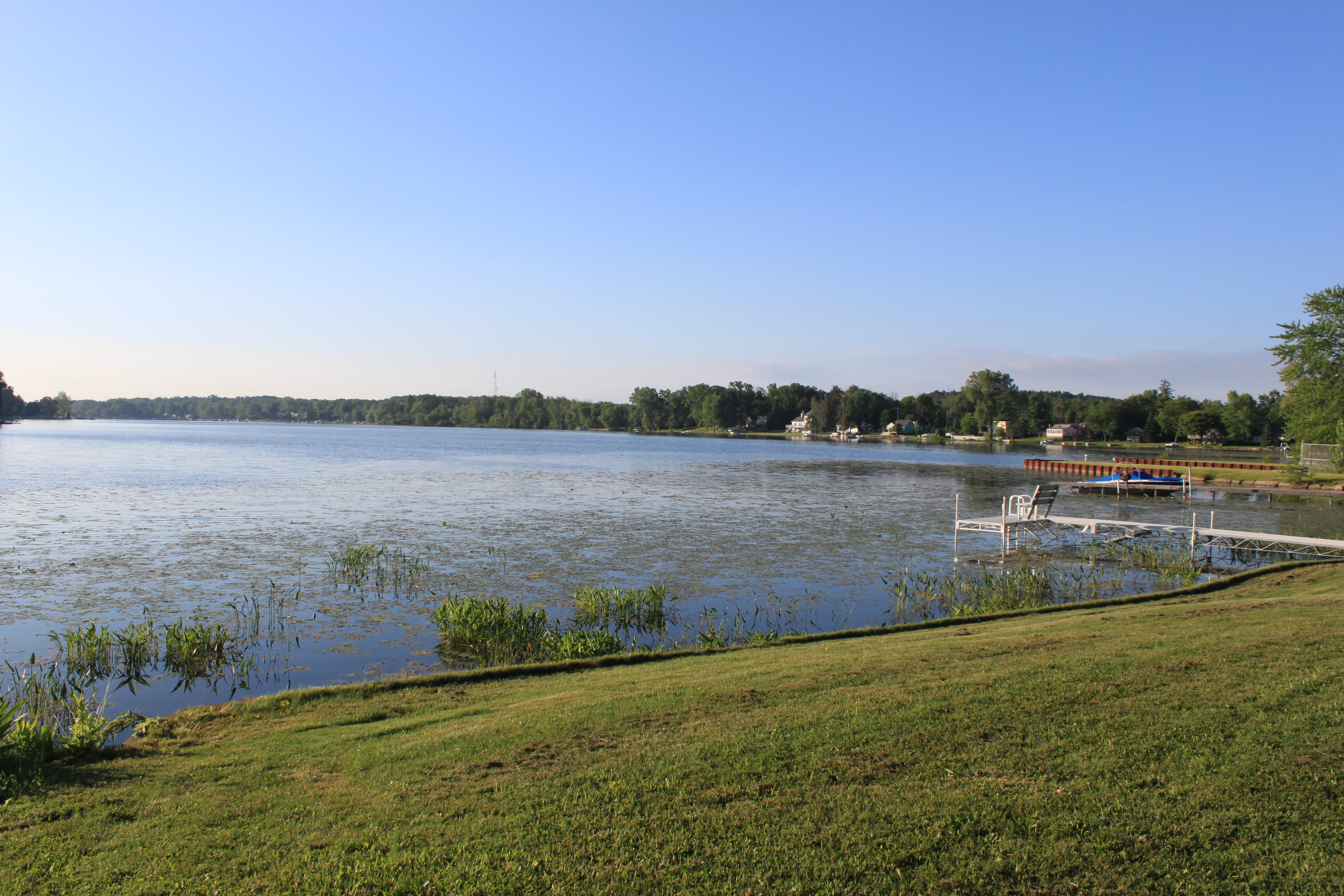
Pleasant Lake from Reno Road

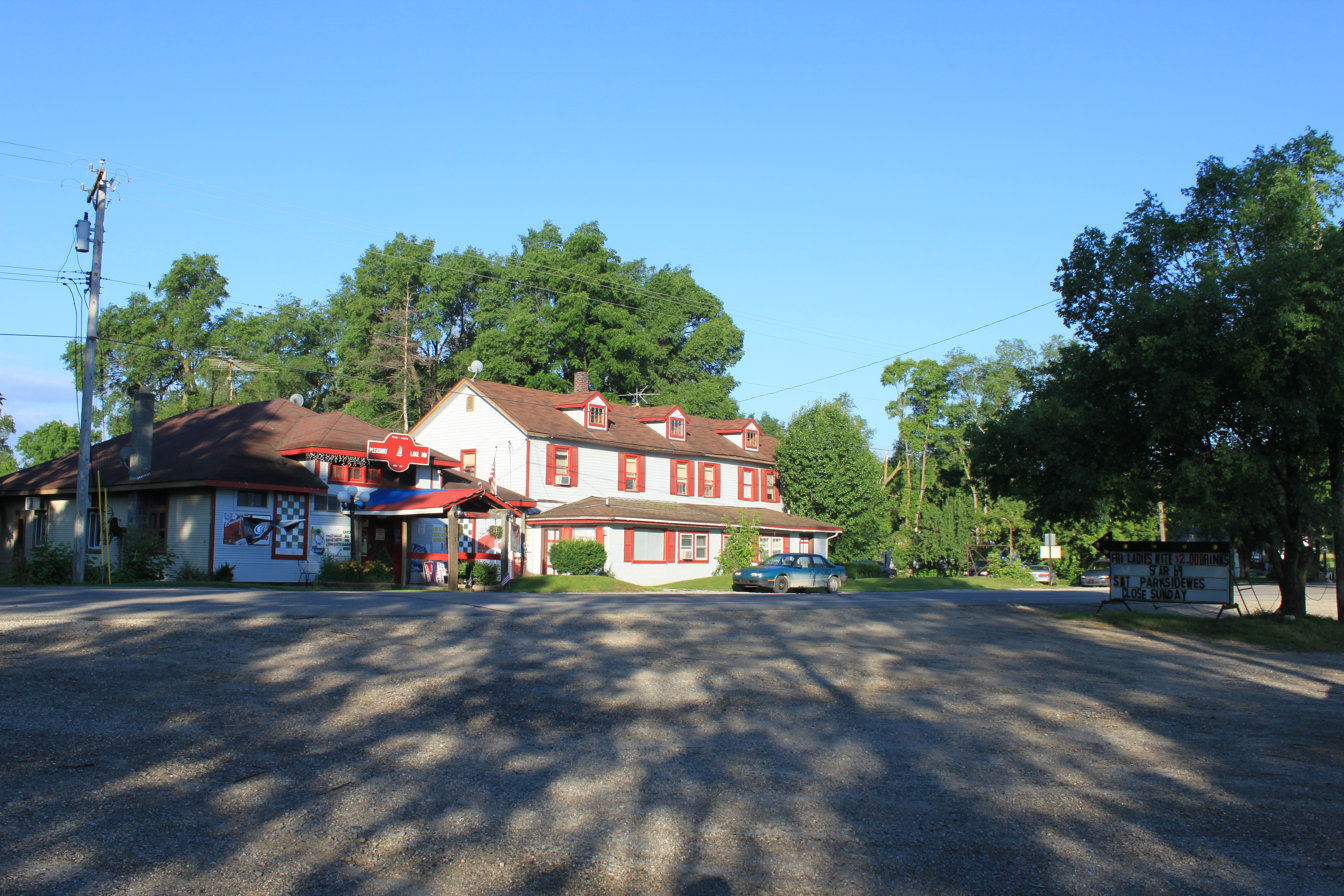
Pleasant Lake Inn

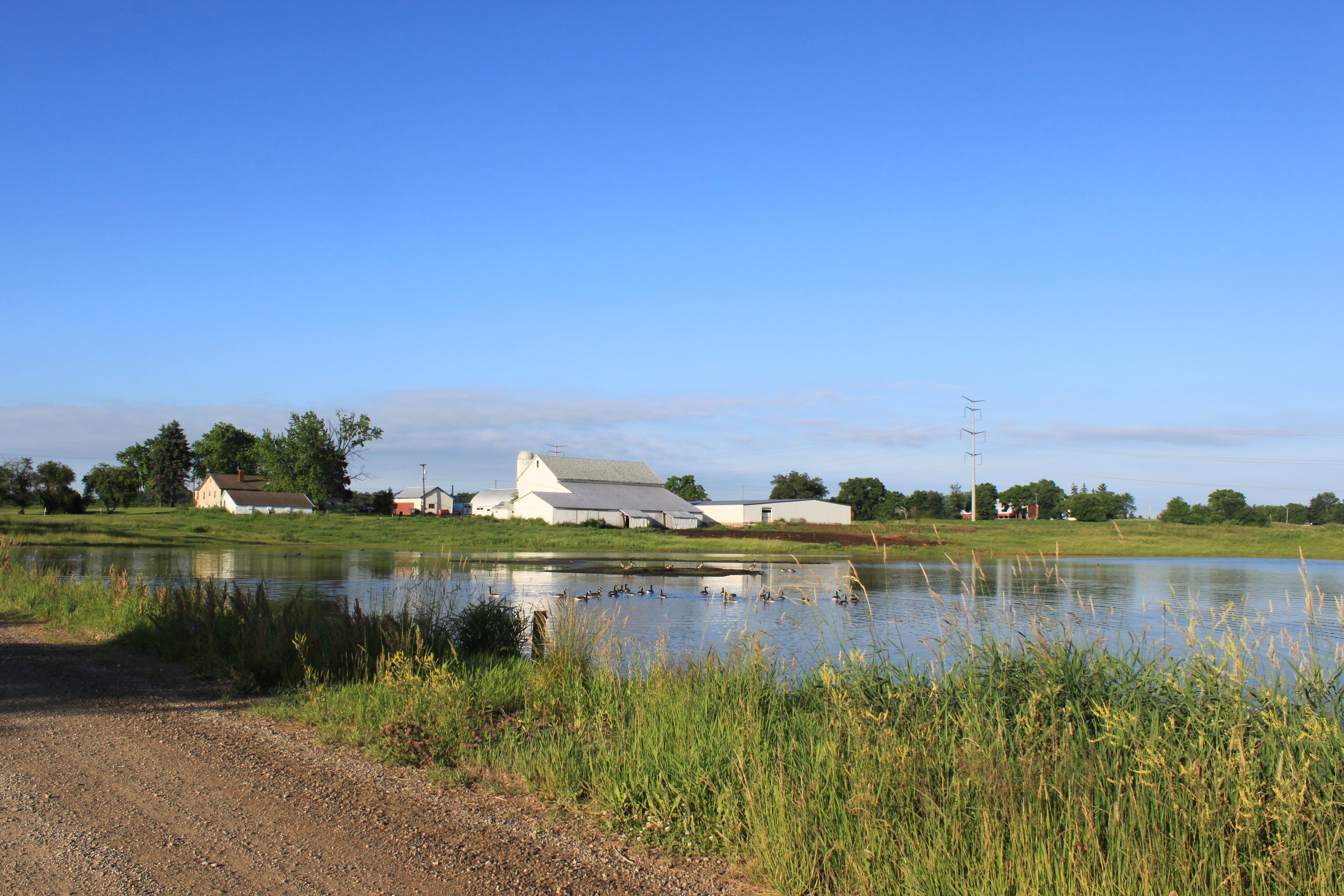
Farm and pond along Schneider Road

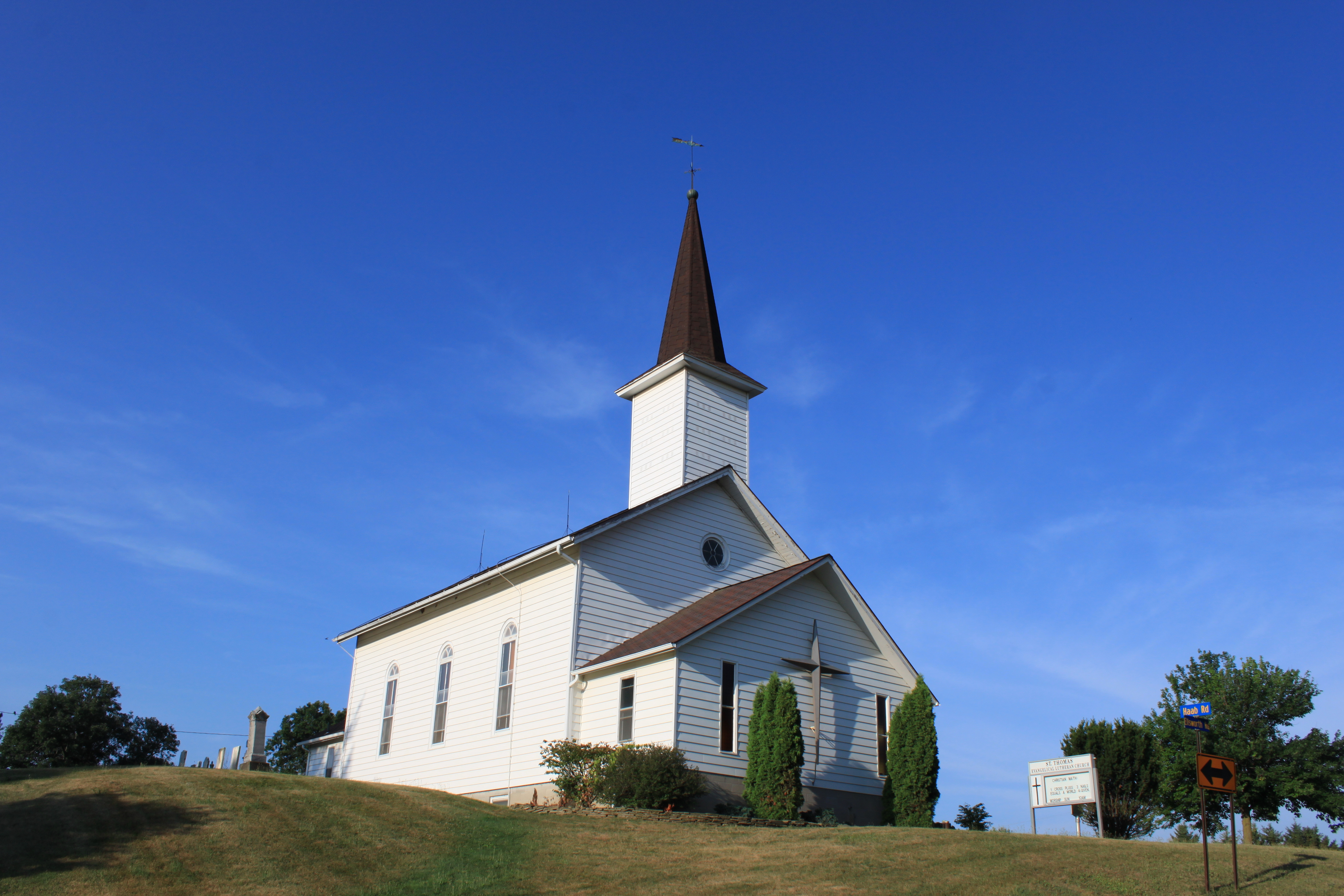
St. Thomas Evangelical Church
