= Saline Area Schools =

School district

Address
- 7265 N. Ann Arbor St. Saline, Washtenaw, Michigan, 48176; United States

District information
- Type: Public
- Grades: Pre-kindergarten through 12
- Superintendent: Stephen D. Laatsch, PhD.
- Schools: 8
- Budget: $95,518,000 (2022-2023 expenditures)
- NCES District ID: 2630660

Students and staff
- Students: 4,683 (2024-2025)
- Teachers: 271.15 FTE (2024-2025)
- Staff: 675.74 FTE (2024-2025)
- Student–teacher ratio: 17.27 (2024-2025)

Other information
- Website: www.salineschools.org

Saline Area Schools is a public school district in Saline, Michigan. The district serves Saline, Pittsfield Charter Township, and a portions of Bridgewater Township, Freedom Township, Lodi Township, Saline Township, and York Township.

== Schools ==
Saline Area Schools
School	Address	Notes
Harvest Elementary	1155 Campus Pkwy.	Grades PreK-3
Pleasant Ridge Elementary	229 Pleasant Ridge Dr.	Grades PreK-3
Woodland Meadows Elementary	350 E. Woodland Dr.	Grades PreK-3
Heritage School	290 E. Woodland Dr.	Grades 4-5
Saline Middle School	7190 N. Maple Rd.	Grades 6-8
Saline High School	1300 Campus Pkwy.	Grades 9-12
Saline Alternative High School	7265 N. Ann Arbor St.	Alternative Education

== High school ==
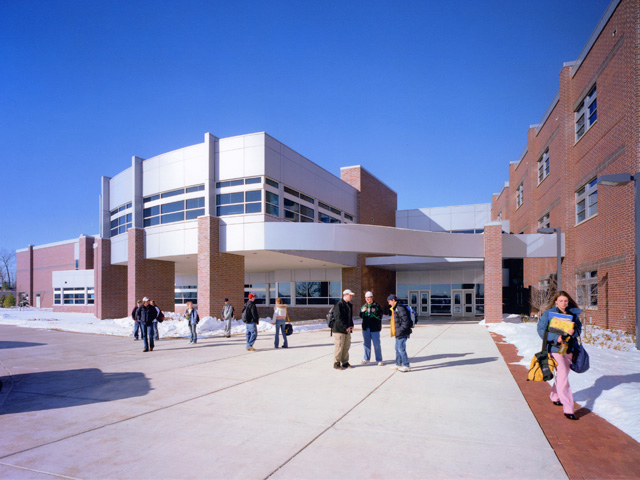
Saline High School in Pittsfield Charter Township

Saline High School was completed in August 2004. Saline High School was the largest in Michigan when built, at approximately 510,000 sq ft (47,000 m^{2}), and cost $60 million ($100.6 million in 2025 dollars). It includes a 2,500-seat gymnasium, and a 1,100-seat auditorium. TMP Associates was the architect.

== Middle school ==
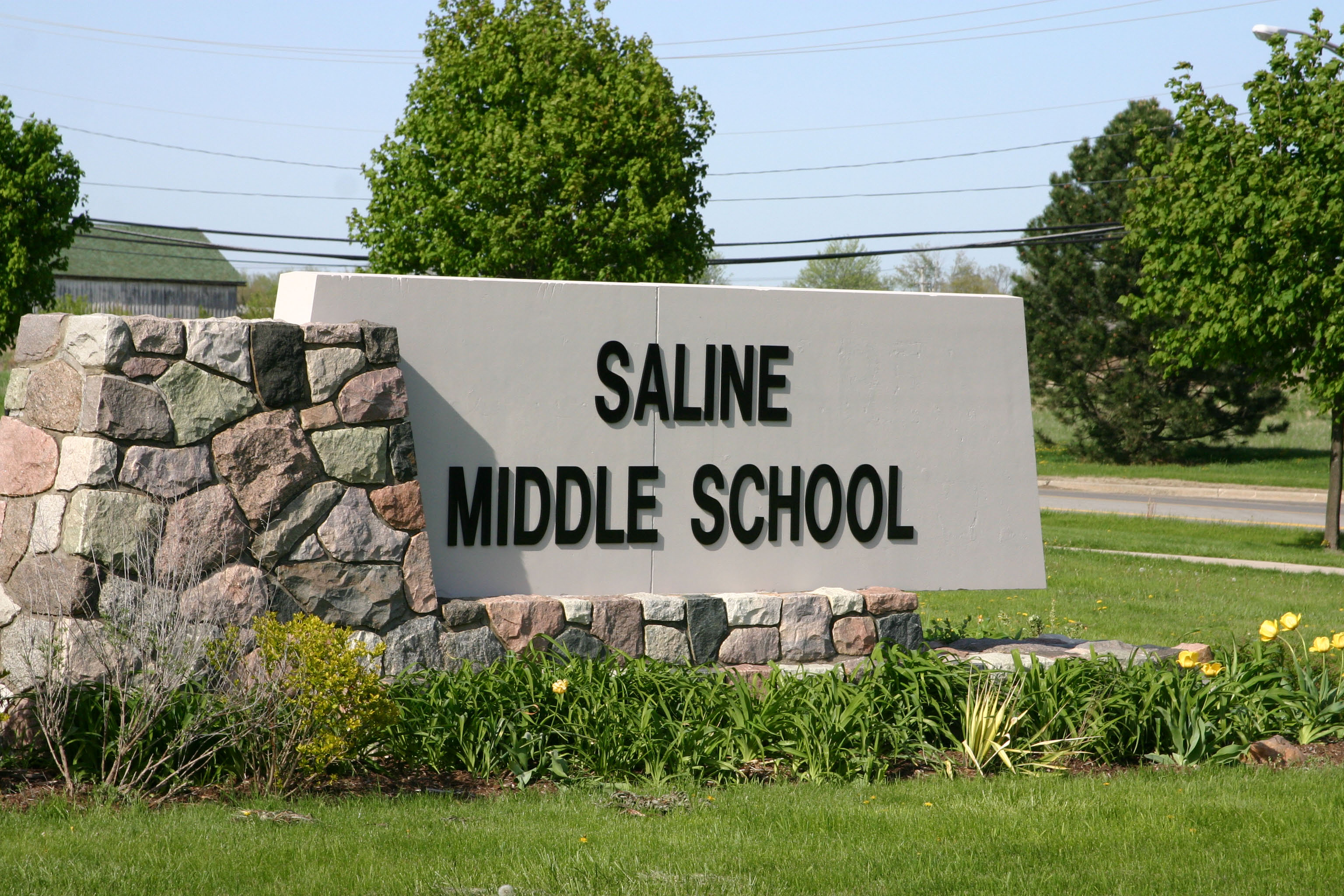
Saline Middle School

Saline Middle School (Grades 6-8) moved into the "old" High School on Maple Road for the 2006-2007 school year. At 250,000 square feet (23,000 m^{2}), it is twice the size of Saline Liberty School which houses administrative offices and the Alternative High School. This building can house up to 1,100 students, as well as the Senior Center which occupies one wing of the facility. It still has, even though slightly smaller than the Liberty School's, a woodshop. As well as the high school, the middle school has a small green screen room as an annex to the multimedia classroom where a group of the students produce the schools video announcements and school yearbook known as "The Hornet", affectionately named after the school districts mascot the "Saline Hornets".
