= Manchester Community Schools =

School district in Michigan

Address
- 710 East Main Street Manchester, Washtenaw, Michigan, 48158; United States

District information
- Motto: Great Education Made Personal.
- Grades: PreKindergarten–12
- Established: 1867
- Superintendent: Steven Head
- Schools: 3
- Budget: $14,295,000 2022–2023 expenditures
- NCES District ID: 2622380

Students and staff
- Students: 681 (2024–2025)
- Teachers: 47.92 (on an FTE basis) (2024–2025)
- Staff: 113.98 FTE (2024–2025)
- Student–teacher ratio: 14.21 (2024–2025)
- District mascot: Flying Dutchmen

Other information
- Website: www.manchesterschools.us

Manchester Community Schools is a public school district in Washtenaw County, Michigan. It serves Manchester and parts of the townships of Bridgewater, Freedom, Sharon, and Manchester. It also serves parts of Napoleon Township and Norvell Township in Jackson County.

== History ==
The district's former high school was built in 1936 at the corner of City and Wolverine Streets. It replaced the 1867 Manchester Union School on the same site. The 1936 school was funded by the Works Progress Administration. Its cornerstone, laid on March 24, 1936, includes a box of historical documents about the building and school district, as well as coins.

Riverside Intermediate School was built in 1954. Luther C. Klager Elementary, named after a long-serving school board president, opened in fall 1969. The architect was Louis Kingscott.

The current junior/senior high school opened in fall 2004.

== Schools ==
Schools in Manchester Community Schools district
School	Address	Notes
Manchester Junior/Senior High School	20500 Dutch Drive, Manchester	Grades 7–12
Riverside Intermediate School	710 E. Main St., Manchester	Grades 3-6
Luther C. Klager Elementary	405 Ann Arbor St., Manchester	Grades PreK-2
