= Clinton Community Schools =

School district in Michigan, U.S.

Address
- 340 East Michigan Ave Clinton, Michigan, 49236; United States

District information
- Grades: PreK–12
- Superintendent: Kevin Beazley
- Budget: $22,280,000 2022-2023 expenditures
- NCES District ID: 2610050

Students and staff
- Enrollment: 1,246 (2024-2025)
- Teachers: 73.22 (on an FTE basis) (2024-2025)
- Staff: 159.35 FTE (2024-2025)
- Student–teacher ratio: 17.02 (2024-2025)
- Athletic conference: Lenawee County Athletic Association
- District mascot: Redwolves
- Colors: Red and Black

Other information
- Website: miclintonschools.org

Clinton Community Schools is a public school district in the Ann Arbor, Michigan area. In Lenawee County, it serves Clinton and parts of the townships of Clinton, Franklin, and Macon. In Washtenaw County, it serves parts of the townships of Bridgewater, Manchester, and Saline.

== History ==
The first school in Clinton was built in 1832. A Union School was built around 1859. A new school was built in 1905.

Clinton Elementary was built around 1952. The previous high school was dedicated on May 16, 1971. The architect was Thurston Jahr. It became the district's middle school when the current high school opened.

In 2010, the district began eliminating Native American imagery associated with its brand and mascot, the Redskins. In July 2020, the school board voted to change the mascot altogether.

A new high school was completed in 2025.

== Schools ==
Schools in Clinton Community Schools district
School	Address	Notes
Clinton High School	340 E. Michigan Avenue, Clinton	Grades 9-12.
Clinton Middle School	340 E. Michigan Avenue, Clinton	Grades 6-8.
Clinton Upper Elementary	100 E. Franklin Street, Clinton	Grades 4-5.
Clinton Elementary	200 E. Franklin Street, Clinton	Grades K-3.
DPP School of Early Learning	330 E. Michigan Avenue, Clinton	Preschool.
