= Saline Township, Michigan =

- Civil township
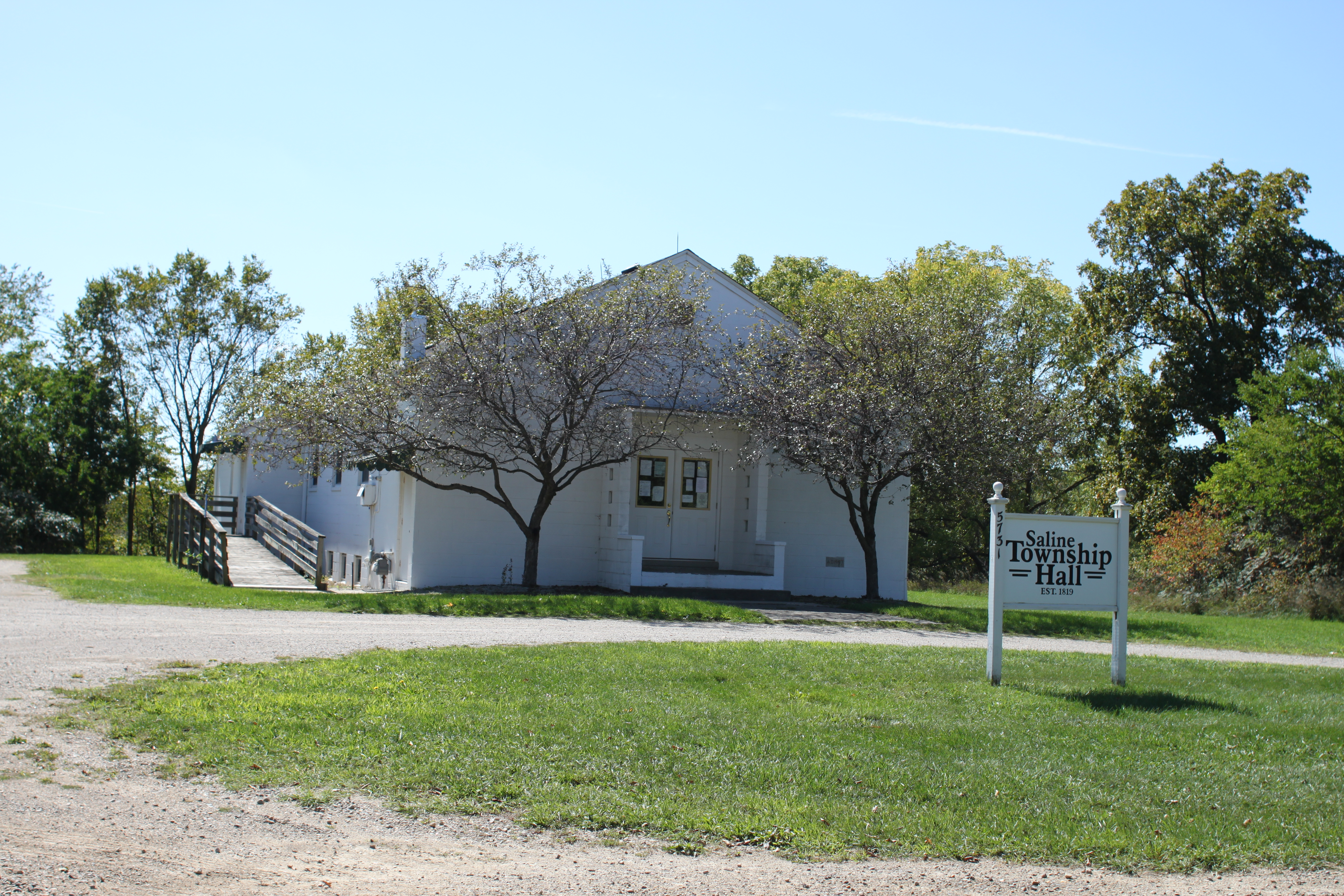
- Saline Township Hall on Braun Road

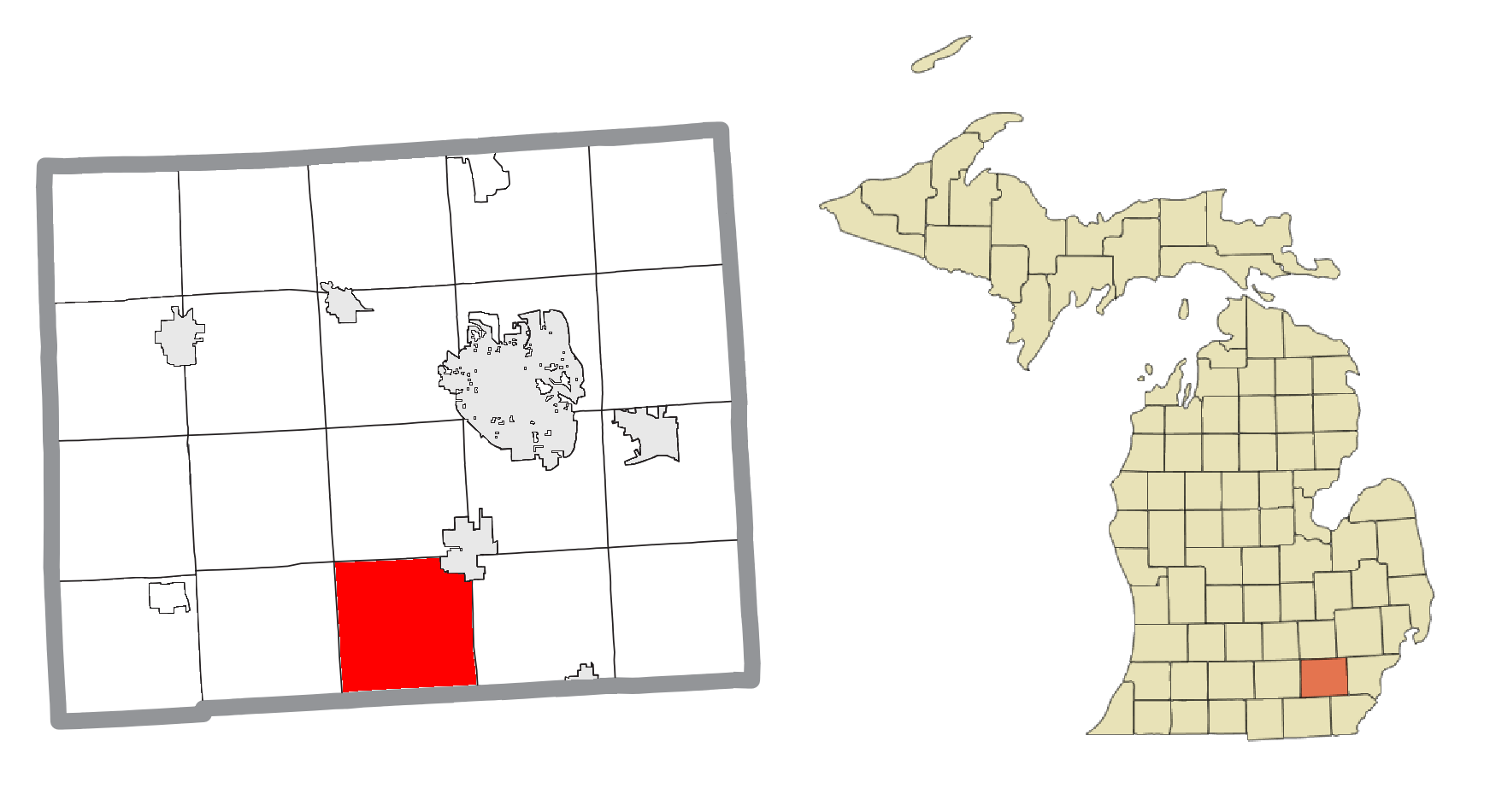
- Location within Washtenaw County

- Location within the state of Michigan Location within the United States
- Coordinates: 42°07′00″N 83°49′00″W
- Country: United States
- State: Michigan
- County: Washtenaw
- Established: 1819

Government
  - Supervisor: James Marion
  - Clerk: Kelly Marion

Area
  - Total: 34.79 sq mi (90.11 km^{2})
  - Land: 34.69 sq mi (89.85 km^{2})
  - Water: 0.10 sq mi (0.26 km^{2})
- Elevation: 850 ft (259 m)

Population (2020)
  - Total: 2,277
  - Density: 65.64/sq mi (25.34/km^{2})
- Time zone: UTC-5 (Eastern (EST))
  - Summer (DST): UTC-4 (EDT)
- ZIP code(s): 48176 (Saline); 49229 (Britton); 49236 (Clinton)
- Area code: 734
- FIPS code: 26-71160
- GNIS feature ID: 1627037
- Website: Official website

Saline Township is a civil township of Washtenaw County, Michigan. The population was 2,277 at the 2020 census. The city of Saline borders the township on the northeast, and the two are administered autonomously.

== Communities ==
- Benton is an unincorporated community located within the township at 42°07′44″N 83°51′44″W. Benton was originally settled along the Detroit–Chicago Pike (present-day U.S. Route 12) with a post office on May 8, 1834. The post office operated until May 21, 1883 but was restored from September 13, 1883 until it ultimately closed on January 5, 1885.
- Union District is a historic community located within the township. A rural post office operated here from May 28, 1836 until September 26, 1859.

== Geography ==
According to the U.S. Census Bureau, the township has a total area of 34.79 square miles (90.11 km^{2}), of which 34.69 square miles (89.85 km^{2}) is land and 0.10 square miles (0.26 km^{2}) (0.29%) is water.

=== Major highways ===
- US 12 (West Michigan Avenue) runs southwest through the center of the township.

== Demographics ==
As of the 2010 census Saline Township had a population of 1,896. The racial and ethnic makeup of the population was 93.9% white, 2.1% black or African American, 0.2% Native American, 0.8% Asian, 0.1% Pacific Islander, 0.7% from some other race and 2.3% from two or more races. 2.5% of the population was Hispanic or Latino of any race.

As of the census of 2000, there were 1,302 people, 460 households, and 372 families residing in the township. The population density was 37.4 inhabitants per square mile (14.4/km^{2}). There were 473 housing units at an average density of 13.6 per square mile (5.2/km^{2}). The racial makeup of the township was 97.70% White, 0.69% African American, 0.69% Asian, and 0.92% from two or more races. Hispanic or Latino of any race were 0.46% of the population.

There were 460 households, out of which 36.5% had children under the age of 18 living with them, 72.8% were married couples living together, 3.7% had a female householder with no husband present, and 19.1% were non-families. 14.6% of all households were made up of individuals, and 5.7% had someone living alone who was 65 years of age or older. The average household size was 2.82 and the average family size was 3.13.

In the township 25.7% of the population was under the age of 18, 7.0% from 18 to 24, 27.1% from 25 to 44, 29.0% from 45 to 64, and 11.2% was 65 years of age or older. The median age was 40 years. For every 100 females, there were 99.1 males. For every 100 females age 18 and over, there were 102.7 males.

The median income for a household in the township was $77,024, and the median income for a family was $84,129. Males had a median income of $48,235 versus $37,212 for females. The per capita income for the township was $30,630. About 2.4% of families and 2.5% of the population were below the poverty line, including none of those under age 18 and 5.2% of those age 65 or over.

== Education ==
Saline Township is served by three public school districts. The vast majority of the township is served by Saline Area Schools. A very small portion of the southwest corner is served by Clinton Community Schools to the southwest in Lenawee County. Milan Area Schools serves a very small area of the southeast corner of the township.

== Development ==
Starting in February 2026, construction began on a large controversial data center located on East Michigan Avenue in Benton known as The Barn. The facility will primarily be used and operated by OpenAI and the tech giant Oracle. The project is situated on a 575-acre site.

== Images ==
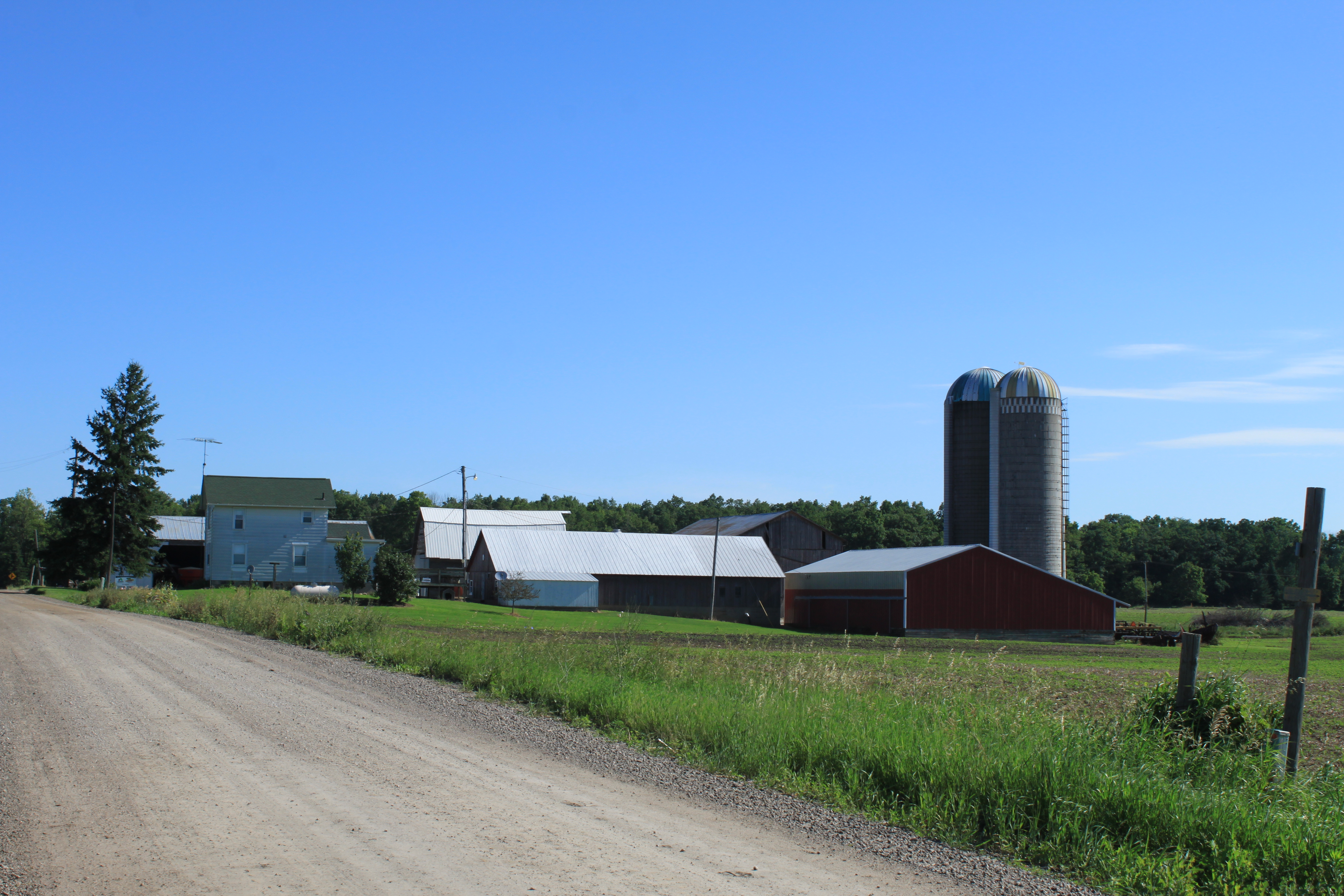
Farmland on Marion Road

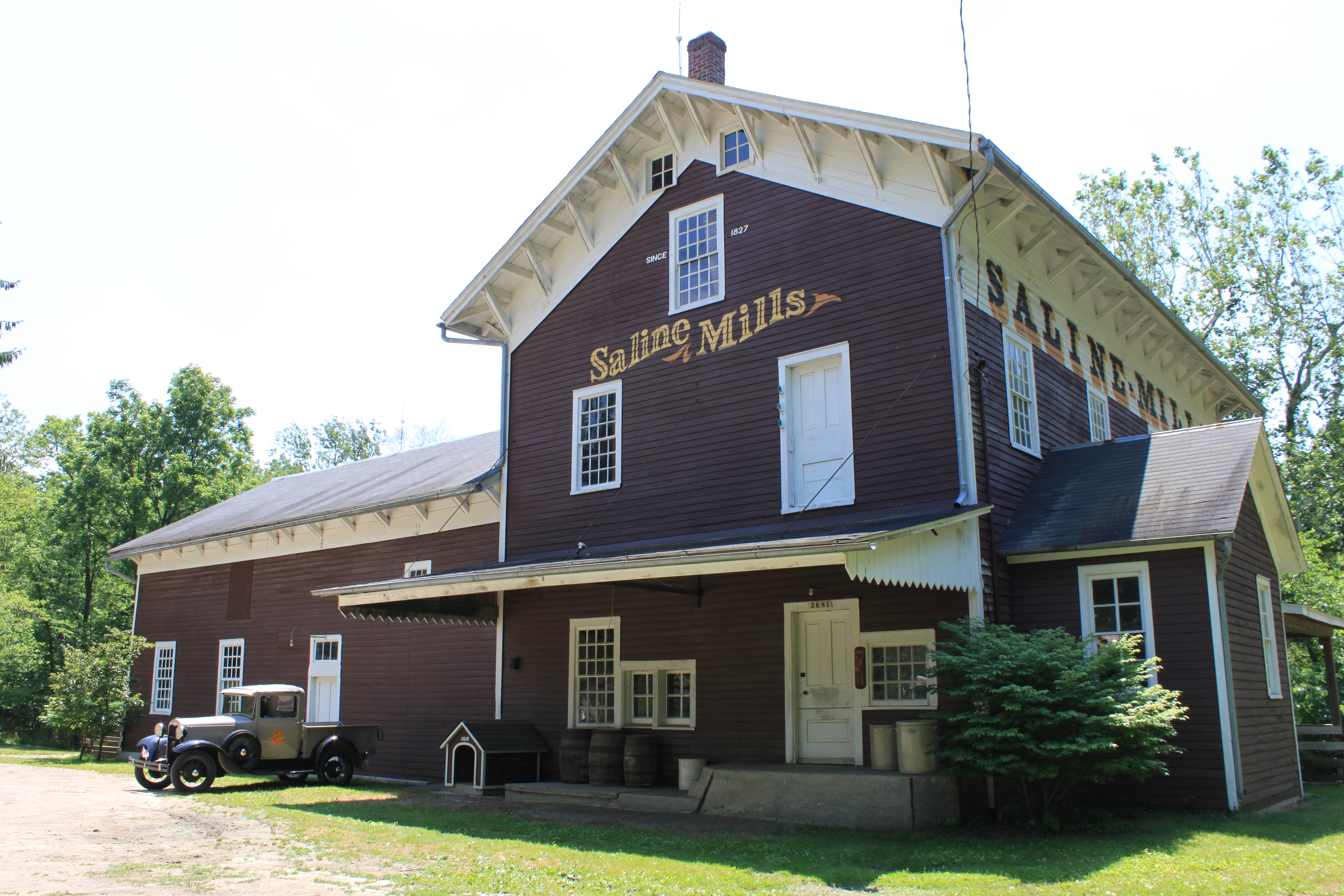
Saline Mills

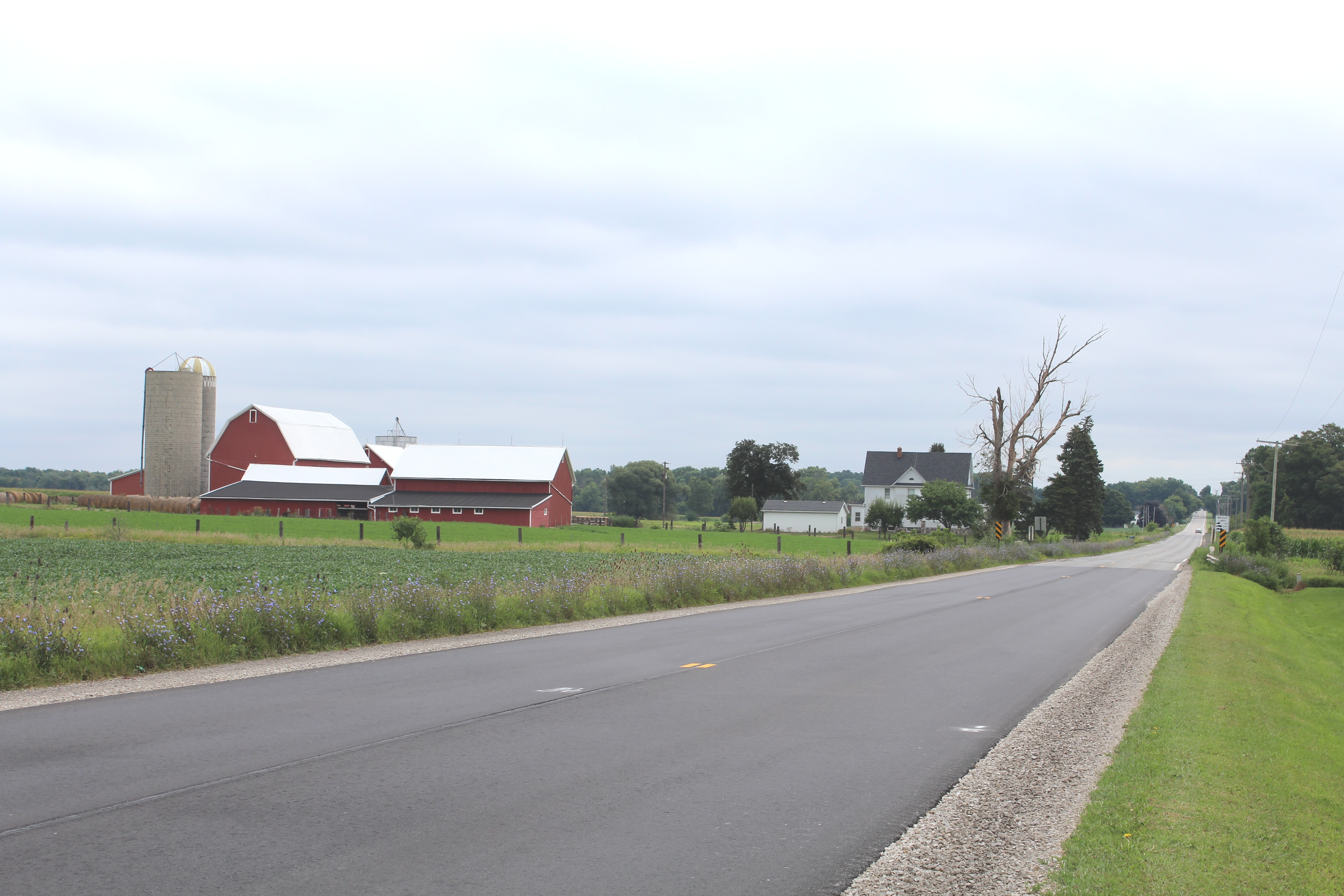
Farmland along Austin Road
