= Manchester Township, Michigan =

- Civil township
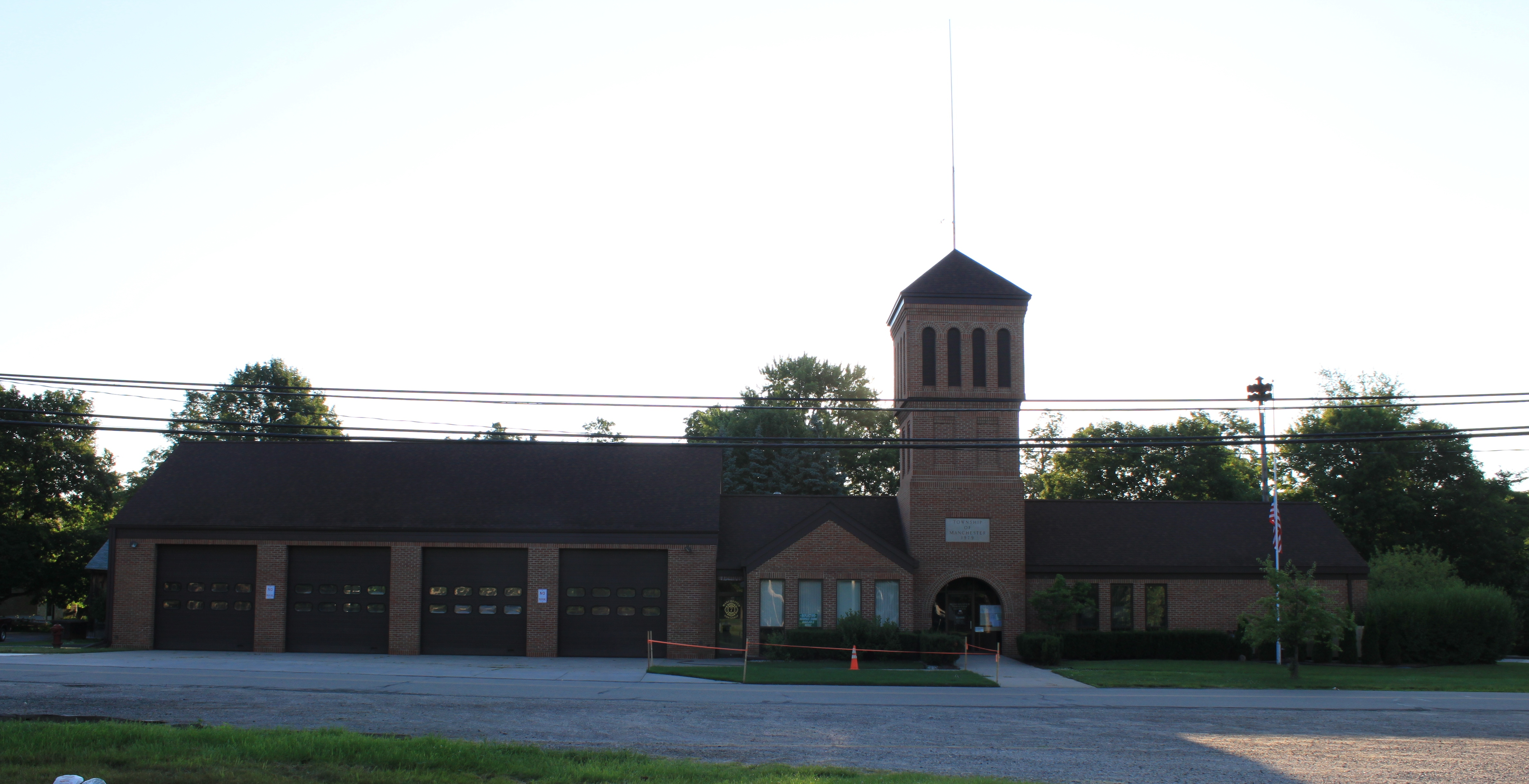
- Township Hall in the city of Manchester

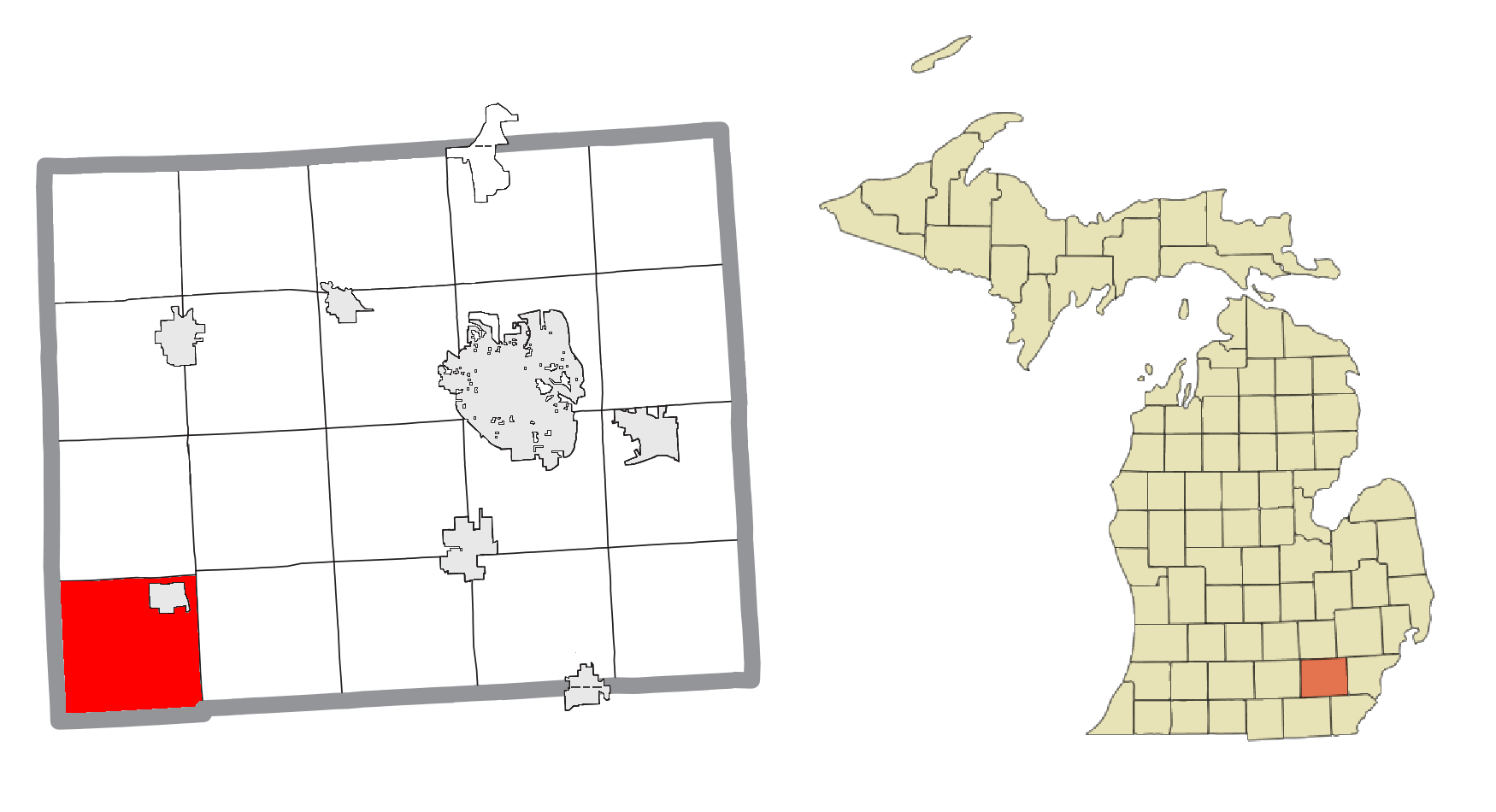
- Location within Washtenaw County

- Location within the state of Michigan Location within the United States
- Coordinates: 42°07′00″N 84°03′00″W
- Country: United States
- State: Michigan
- County: Washtenaw
- Established: 1837

Government
  - Supervisor: Ron Milkey
  - Clerk: Danell Proctor

Area
  - Total: 38.76 sq mi (100.39 km^{2})
  - Land: 37.86 sq mi (98.06 km^{2})
  - Water: 0.90 sq mi (2.33 km^{2})
- Elevation: 978 ft (298 m)

Population (2020)
  - Total: 4,626
  - Density: 122.2/sq mi (47.2/km^{2})
- Time zone: UTC-5 (Eastern (EST))
  - Summer (DST): UTC-4 (EDT)
- ZIP code(s): 48158 (Manchester); 49236 (Clinton); 49287 (Tipton)
- Area code: 734
- FIPS code: 26-50680
- GNIS feature ID: 1626665
- Website: Official website

Manchester Township is a civil township of Washtenaw County in the U.S. state of Michigan. The population was 4,626 at the 2020 census, although the population is less now after the village of Manchester, which was within the boundaries of the township, incorporated as an autonomous city in 2023.

== Communities ==
- Elba is a historic community located within the township. Elba had its own post office from May 7, 1834 until February 15, 1853.
- Manchester was a village located in the northeast portion of the township. The village gained self-autonomy when it incorporated as a city in 2023.
- Spike is the name of a former post office that operated within the township briefly from February 16, 1895 until March 19, 1896. It appeared in Section 20 of an 1895 map of Manchester Township.

== Geography ==
According to the U.S. Census Bureau, the township has a total area of 38.76 square miles (100.39 km^{2}), of which 37.86 square miles (98.06 km^{2}) is land and 0.90 square miles (2.33 km^{2}) (2.32%) is water.

Manchester Township contains portions of two state parks. The township contains 405 acres (1.64 km^{2}) of the Watkins Lake State Park and County Preserve, which also extends west into Jackson County. The township also contains a very small portion of Hayes State Park surrounding Round Lake in the southwest corner of the county. The River Raisin flows through the northeast corner of the township.

=== Major highways ===
- US 12 (West Michigan Avenue) forms a portions of the southern boundary of the township.
- M-52 runs south–north along the eastern edge of the township and through the city of Manchester

== Demographics ==
As of the census of 2000, there were 4,102 people, 1,617 households, and 1,151 families residing in the township. The population density was 107.8 inhabitants per square mile (41.6/km^{2}). There were 1,718 housing units at an average density of 45.2 per square mile (17.5/km^{2}). The racial makeup of the township was 98.15% White, 0.37% African American, 0.46% Native American, 0.17% Asian, 0.27% from other races, and 0.59% from two or more races. Hispanic or Latino of any race were 1.15% of the population.

There were 1,617 households, out of which 34.0% had children under the age of 18 living with them, 58.8% were married couples living together, 9.1% had a female householder with no husband present, and 28.8% were non-families. 24.1% of all households were made up of individuals, and 9.4% had someone living alone who was 65 years of age or older. The average household size was 2.54 and the average family size was 3.03.

In the township the population was spread out, with 26.3% under the age of 18, 6.5% from 18 to 24, 29.5% from 25 to 44, 25.8% from 45 to 64, and 12.0% who were 65 years of age or older. The median age was 38 years. For every 100 females, there were 96.8 males. For every 100 females age 18 and over, there were 92.2 males.

The median income for a household in the township was $55,847, and the median income for a family was $62,786. Males had a median income of $50,625 versus $30,333 for females. The per capita income for the township was $27,038. About 3.4% of families and 4.3% of the population were below the poverty line, including 3.8% of those under age 18 and 4.1% of those age 65 or over.

== Education ==
Manchester Township is served by three separate public school districts. Most of the township is served by Manchester Community Schools. The southeast portion of the township is served by Clinton Community Schools in Clinton in Lenawee County, while the southwest corner of the township is served by Columbia School District to the west in Jackson County.

== Images ==
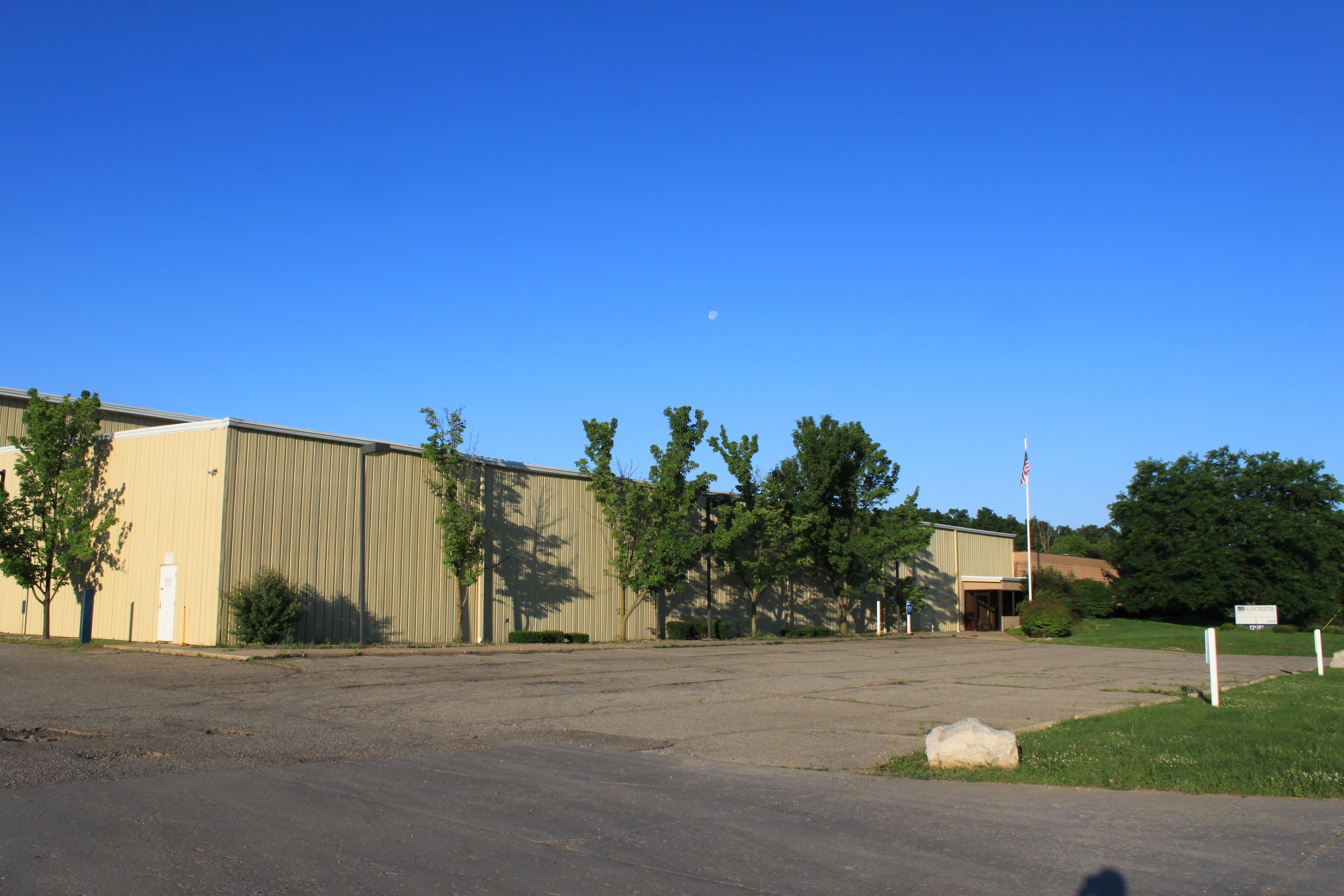
AMI Manchester stamping plant

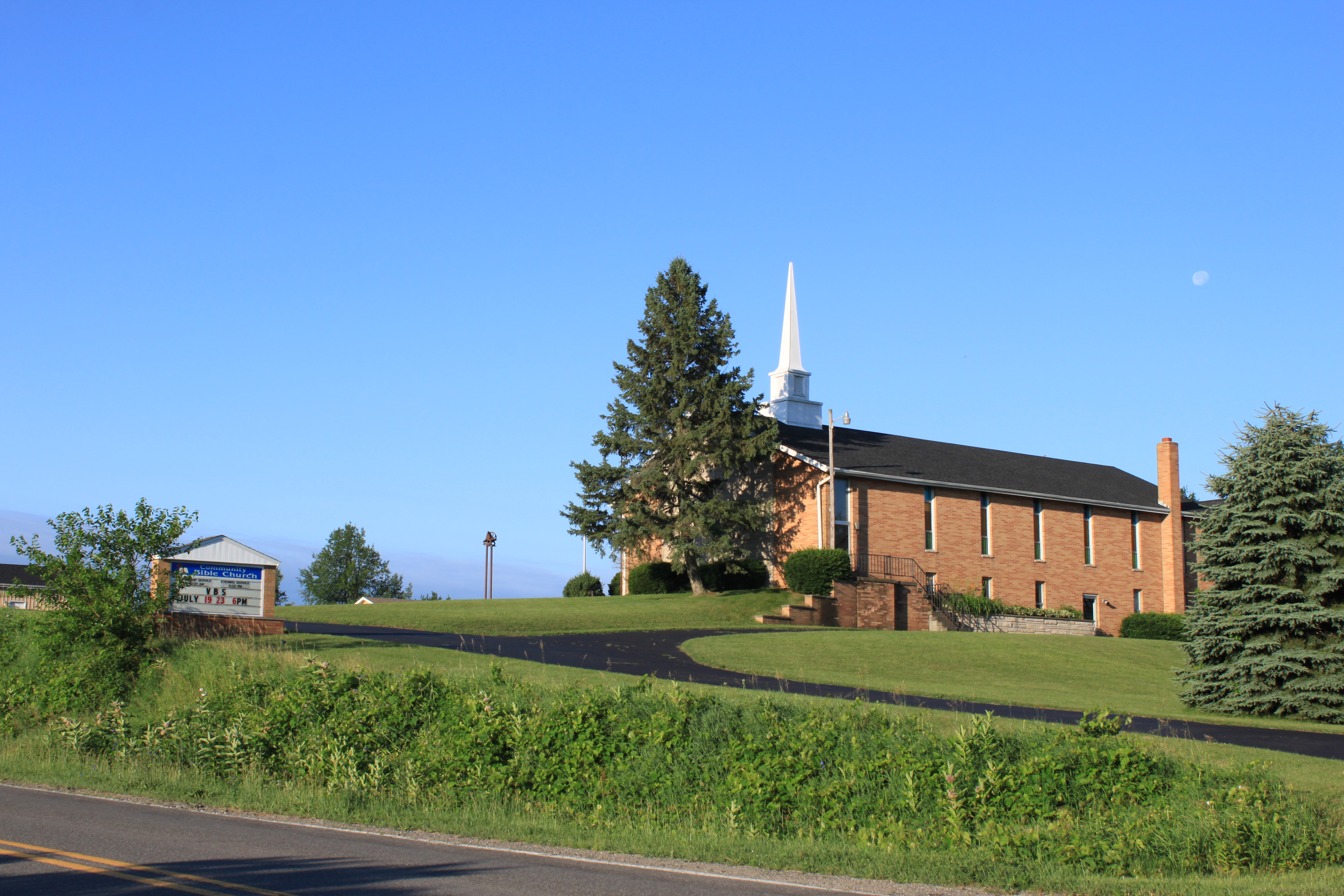
Community Bible Church

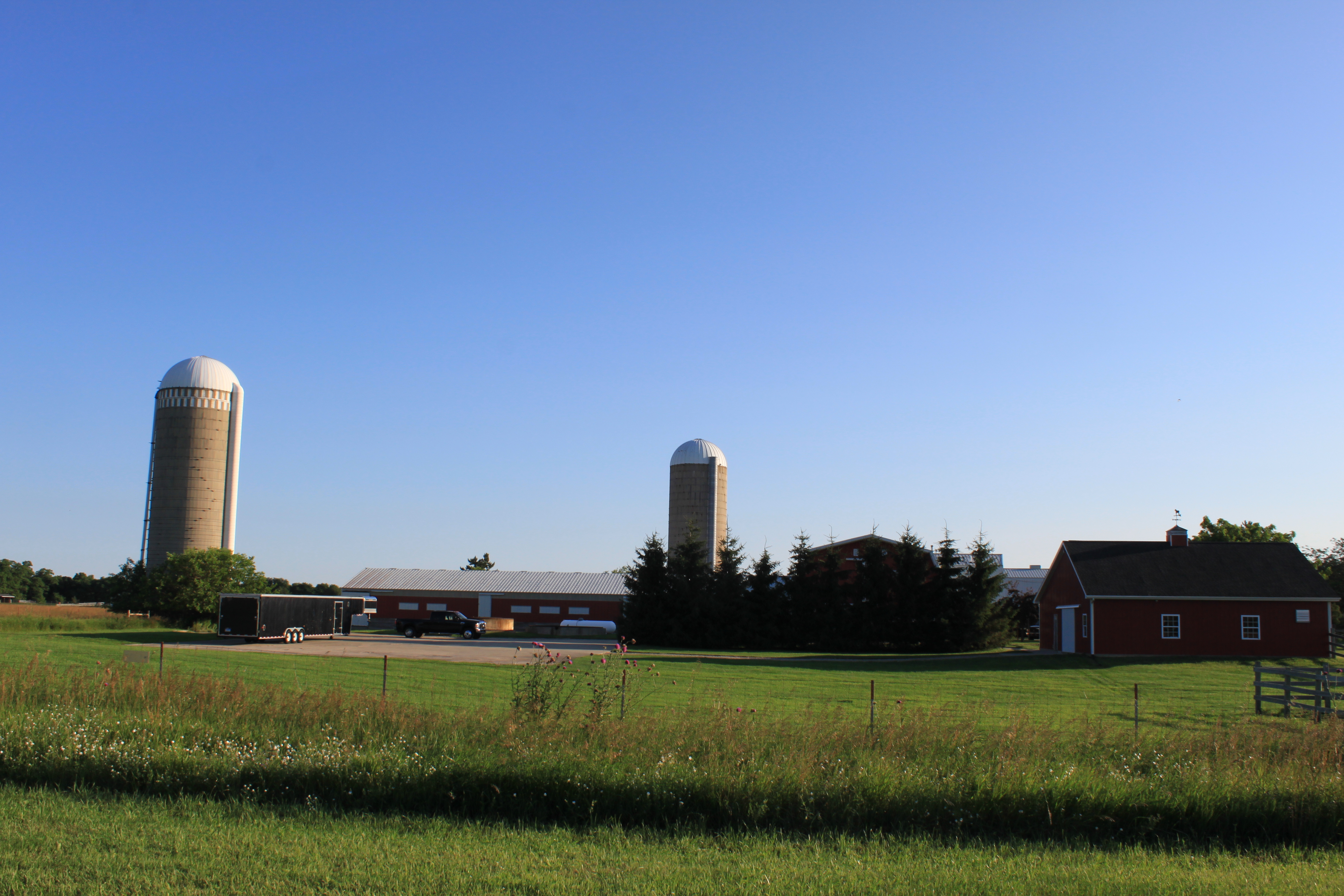
Farmland on Sharon Hollow Road
