= Sharon Township, Michigan =

- Civil township
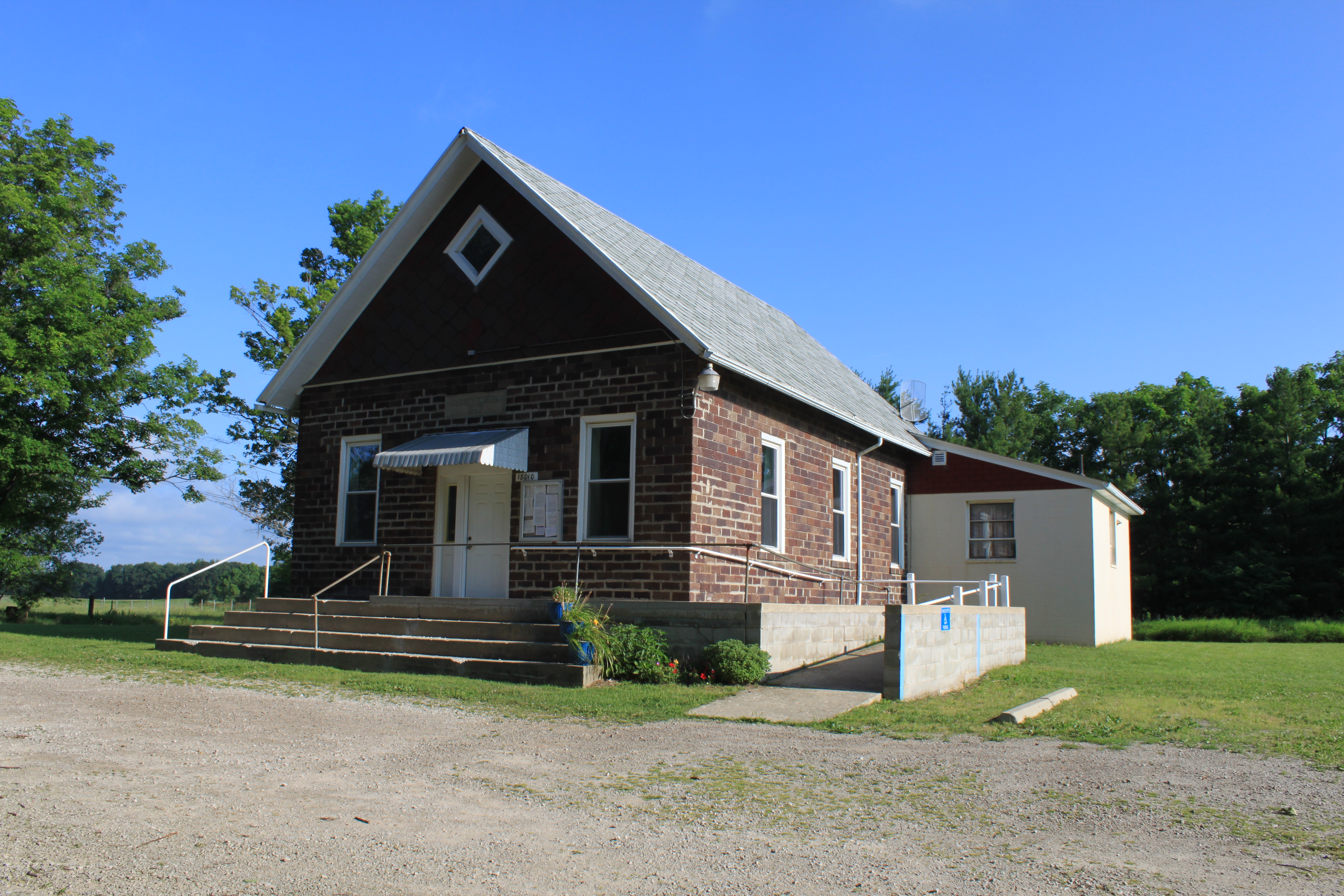
- Township Hall on Pleasant Lake Road

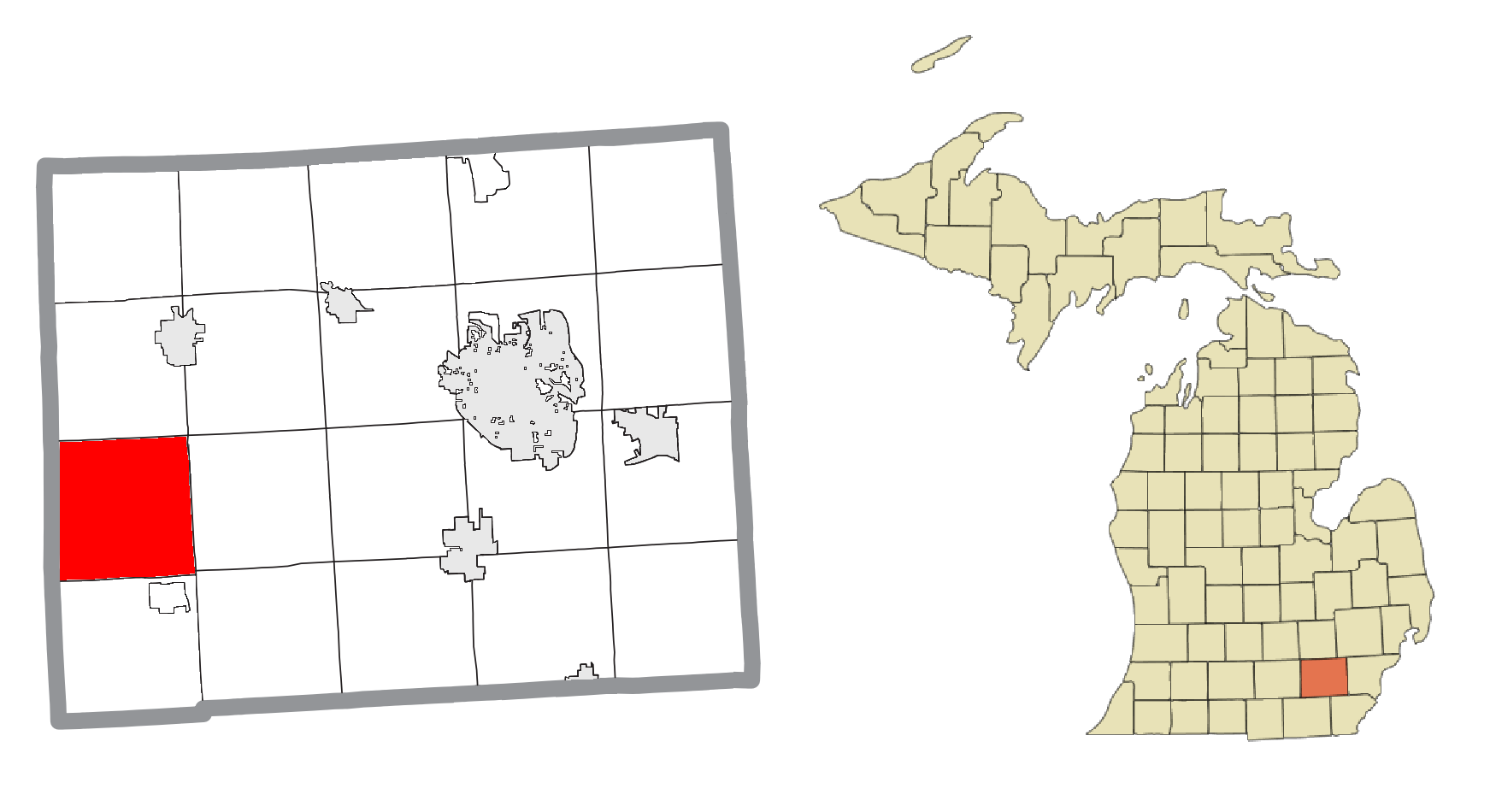
- Location within Washtenaw County

- Location within the state of Michigan Location within the United States
- Coordinates: 42°12′31″N 84°04′57″W
- Country: United States
- State: Michigan
- County: Washtenaw
- Established: 1834

Government
  - Supervisor: Peter Psarouthakis
  - Clerk: Chelsea Mikel

Area
  - Total: 37.86 sq mi (98.06 km^{2})
  - Land: 37.41 sq mi (96.89 km^{2})
  - Water: 0.45 sq mi (1.17 km^{2})
- Elevation: 980 ft (300 m)

Population (2020)
  - Total: 1,817
  - Density: 48.57/sq mi (18.75/km^{2})
- Time zone: UTC-5 (Eastern (EST))
  - Summer (DST): UTC-4 (EDT)
- ZIP code(s): 48118 (Chelsea); 48158 (Manchester); 49240 (Grass Lake)
- Area code: 734
- FIPS code: 26-72760
- GNIS feature ID: 1627061
- Website: Official website

Sharon Township is a civil township of Washtenaw County in the U.S. state of Michigan. The population was 1,817 at the 2020 census.

== Communities ==
- Rowes Corner is an unincorporated community located within the township at the intersection of M-52 and Pleasant Lake Road at 42°11′30″N 84°01′57″W.
- Sharon was the first settlement within the community when plots of land were purchased in 1830, and settlers moved to the area starting in 1831. Sharon Township itself was organized in 1834 and was named after Sharon, Connecticut. The first post office opened under the name Richfield in February 1832 but was changed to the name of Sharon on January 15, 1836 after the name of the township. The post office operated until July 15, 1855. The community of Sharon would later develop into Sharon Plain and Sharonville.
- Sharon Hollow is an unincorporated community located on the north banks of the River Raisin within the township at 42°10′42″N 84°05′38″W. It is the present-day community that derived from the historic Sharon, Sharon Plains, and Sharonville communities.
- Sharon Plain is a former settlement within the township that was settled with a very briefly operating post office from June 24 to September 18, 1867. It was named after the township and a successor of the Sharon community that eventually became Sharonville.
- Sharonville is a former community located within the township. Sharonville briefly had its own post office from December 14, 1891 until September 1, 1899.

== Geography ==
According to the U.S. Census Bureau, the township has a total area of 37.86 square miles (98.06 km^{2}), of which 37.41 square miles (96.89 km^{2}) is land and 0.45 square miles (1.17 km^{2}) (1.19%) is water.

The River Raisin flows through the township. The eastern portion of the Sharonville State Game Area is located within the township and extends west into Jackson County.

=== Major highways ===
- M-52 runs south–north through the eastern portion of the township.

== Demographics ==
As of the census of 2000, there were 1,678 people, 593 households, and 492 families residing in the township. The population density was 44.6 inhabitants per square mile (17.2/km^{2}). There were 609 housing units at an average density of 16.2 per square mile (6.2/km^{2}). The racial makeup of the township was 96.66% White, 0.42% African American, 0.18% Native American, 0.12% Asian, 0.06% Pacific Islander, 1.67% from other races, and 0.89% from two or more races. Hispanic or Latino of any race were 3.04% of the population.

There were 593 households, out of which 33.4% had children under the age of 18 living with them, 77.7% were married couples living together, 3.0% had a female householder with no husband present, and 16.9% were non-families. 13.2% of all households were made up of individuals, and 5.6% had someone living alone who was 65 years of age or older. The average household size was 2.76 and the average family size was 3.04.

In the township the population was spread out, with 26.0% under the age of 18, 5.2% from 18 to 24, 29.9% from 25 to 44, 29.4% from 45 to 64, and 9.5% who were 65 years of age or older. The median age was 39 years. For every 100 females, there were 99.5 males. For every 100 females age 18 and over, there were 98.4 males.

The median income for a household in the township was $75,979, and the median income for a family was $81,249. Males had a median income of $55,139 versus $32,679 for females. The per capita income for the township was $28,304. About 1.2% of families and 3.4% of the population were below the poverty line, including 1.0% of those under age 18 and 2.6% of those age 65 or over.

== Education ==
Sharon Township is served by three separate public school districts. The majority of the township is served by Manchester Community Schools to the south in Manchester. The northern portion of the township is served by Chelsea School District in Chelsea. A very small portion in the northwest corner of the township is served by Grass Lake Community Schools to the west in Jackson County.

== Images ==
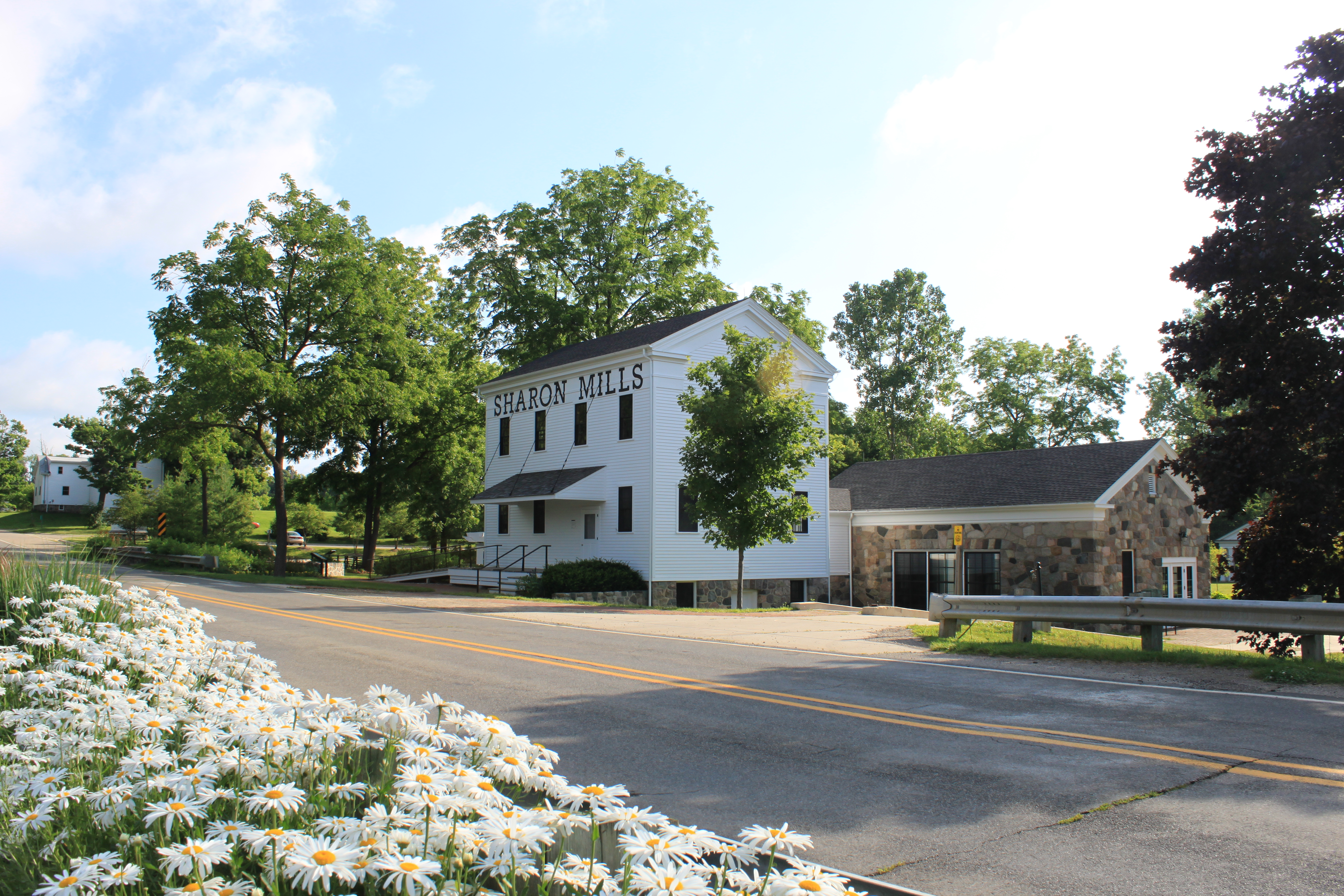
Sharon Mills County Park

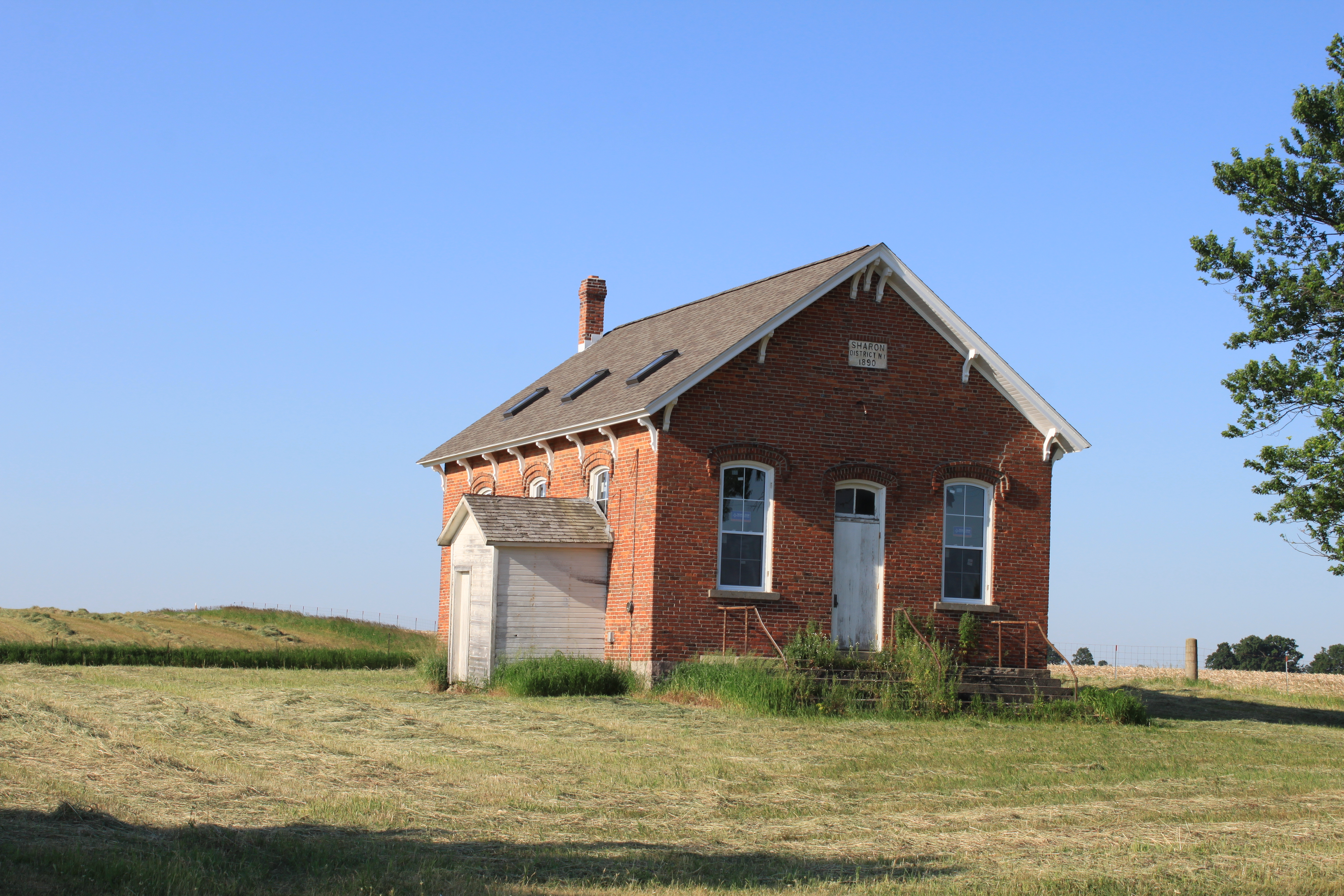
Sharon District No. 1 School

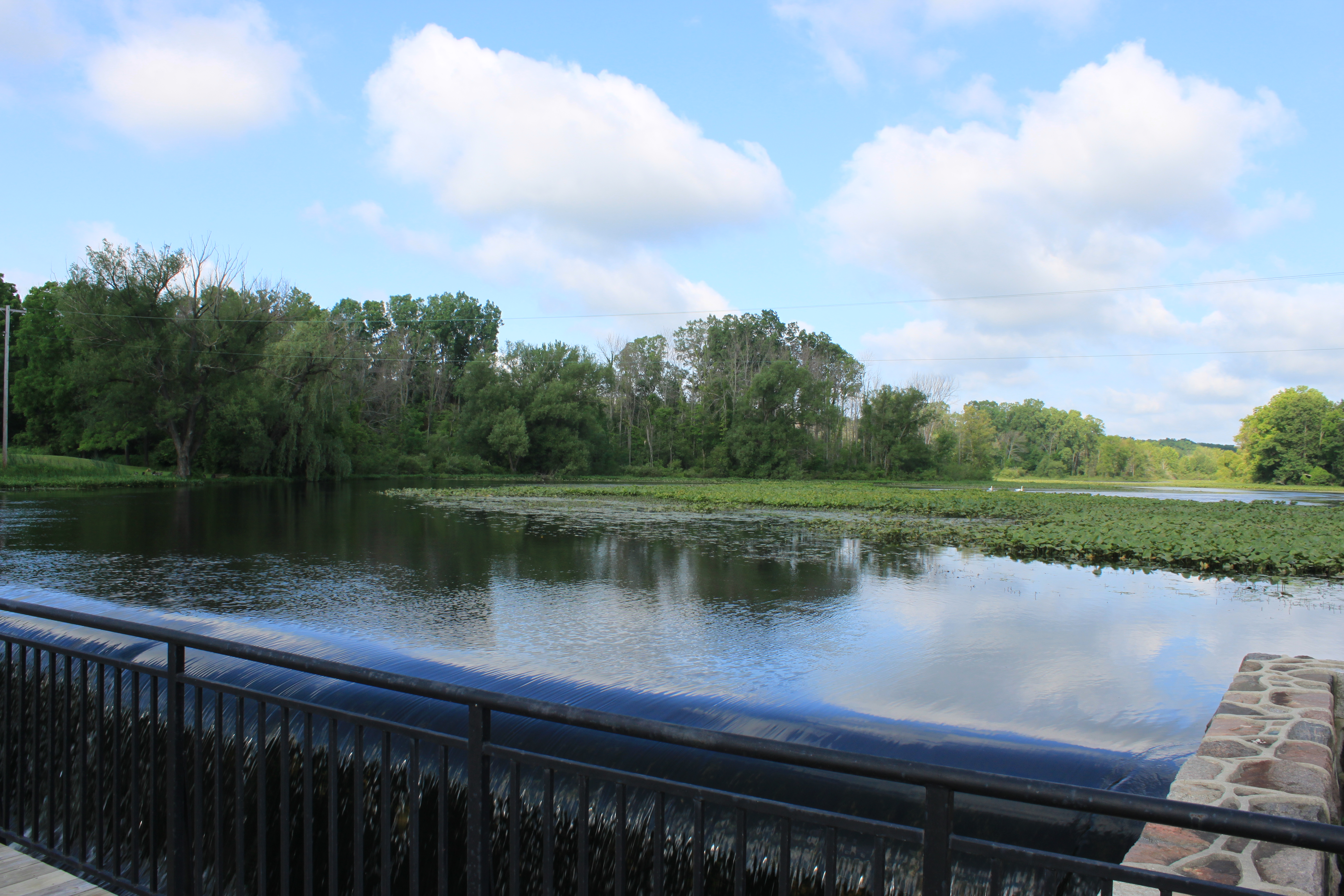
River Raisin flowing through the township
