= Chelsea High School (Michigan) =

High school in Chelsea, Michigan, United States

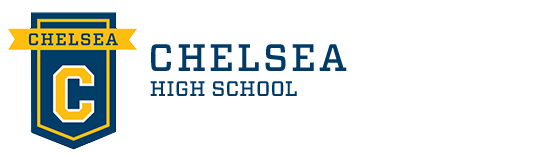

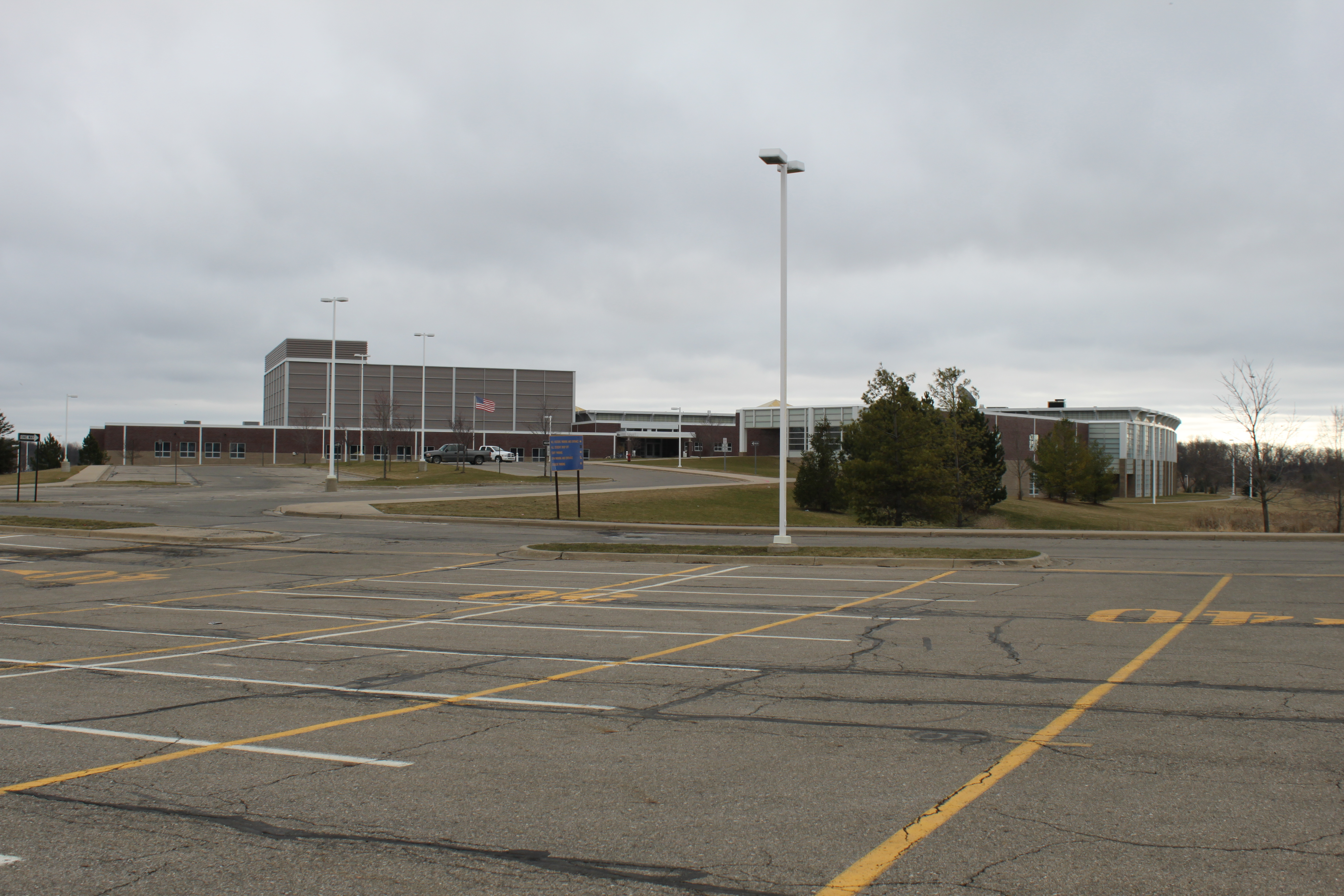

Location
- 740 North Freer Road; Chelsea, Michigan 48118; United States
- Coordinates: 42°18′41″N 84°00′08″W

Information
- Type: Public
- Superintendent: Michael J. Kapolka
- Principal: Amanda Clor
- Teaching staff: 45.90 (FTE)
- Grades: 9-12
- Enrollment: 750 (2024-2025)
- Student to teacher ratio: 16.34
- Colors: Blue and gold
- Athletics conference: Southeastern Conference (MHSAA)
- Nickname: Bulldogs
- Website: chs.chelseaschools.org

Student assessments
- 2021–22 school year Change vs. prior year

M-STEP 11th grade proficiency rates (Science / Social Studies)
- Advanced %: 32.8 / 23.3
- Proficient %: 28.9 / 40.6
- PR. Proficient %: 12.2 / 29.4
- Not Proficient %: 26.1 / 6.7

Average test scores
- SAT Total: 1085 (▼ −15)

Chelsea High School (CHS) is a public high school located in Chelsea, Michigan, United States. It is part of the Chelsea School District.

== Demographics ==
The demographic breakdown of the 750 students enrolled in 2024-2025 was:

- Male (407) - 54.3%
- Female (343) - 45.7%
- Non-Hispanic White (660) - 88%
- Hispanic (47) - 6.3%
- Multiracial (33) - 4.4%
- Asian/Pacific islanders (4) - 1%
- Black (4) - 0.53%
- Native American/Alaskan (0) - 0%

A total of 67 students (8.9%) were eligible for free or reduced price lunches.

== Athletics ==
Chelsea is a member of the Southeastern Conference and the Michigan High School Athletic Association MHSAA SEC. It is a Class B school and competes in Division 2 in all sports except for ice hockey, men's and women's swimming and diving, football, and men's and women's tennis which are Division 3.

== Notable alumni ==
- Jeff Daniels - actor
- Tony Scheffler - NFL tight end
- Fallon Henley - pro wrestler
- Kiana Weber - violinist
