= Chelsea School District =

School district in Michigan

Address
- 500 Washington Street Chelsea, Washtenaw, Michigan, 48118; United States

District information
- Type: Public
- Grades: PreK–12
- Superintendent: Mike Kapolka
- Budget: $55,498,000 2022-2023 expenditures
- NCES District ID: 2608940

Students and staff
- Students: 2,257 (2024-2025)
- Teachers: 142.59 FTE (2024-2025)
- Staff: 354.16 FTE (2024-2025)
- Student–teacher ratio: 15.83

Other information
- Website: www.chelseaschools.org

Chelsea School District is a school district in Washtenaw County and Jackson County, Michigan. Besides the city of Chelsea it serves Sylvan Township and parts of the following townships: Dexter, Freedom, Lima, Lyndon, Sharon, and Waterloo.

== History ==
The predecessor to the present Chelsea High School was designed by architect Minoru Yamasaki and built in 1958. It was located on the west side of Freer Road, across from the driveway to the present high school. Inspired by the layout of a town, it was a collection of individual single-story buildings connected by covered sidewalks. Many students found going outside between classes inconvenient, and others praised Yamasaki's design.

In 1993, superintendent Joseph Piasecki was shot and killed by a teacher. The principal and another teacher were also shot. The shooting occurred in a meeting room at the administration building on the high school campus after a grievance meeting when the teacher returned with a gun. In 1998, the Detroit Free Press devoted a special series to the teacher, Stephen Leith, and his marriage to analyze why the shooting occurred.

The current Chelsea High School was built in 1998.

== Schools ==
Schools in Chelsea School District
School	Address	Notes
Chelsea High School	740 N. Freer Rd., Chelsea	Serves grades 9–12. Built 1998.
Beach Middle School	445 Mayer Dr., Chelsea	Serves grades 6–8
South Meadows Elementary School	335 Pierce St., Chelsea	Serves grades 3–5
North Creek Elementary School	699 McKinley St., Chelsea	Serves grades K–2
Pierce Lake Early Childhood Center	275 N. Freer Rd., Chelsea	Preschool and early childhood programs
