= Chelsea Commercial Historic District =

Historic district in Michigan, United States

- U.S. National Register of Historic Places
- U.S. Historic district
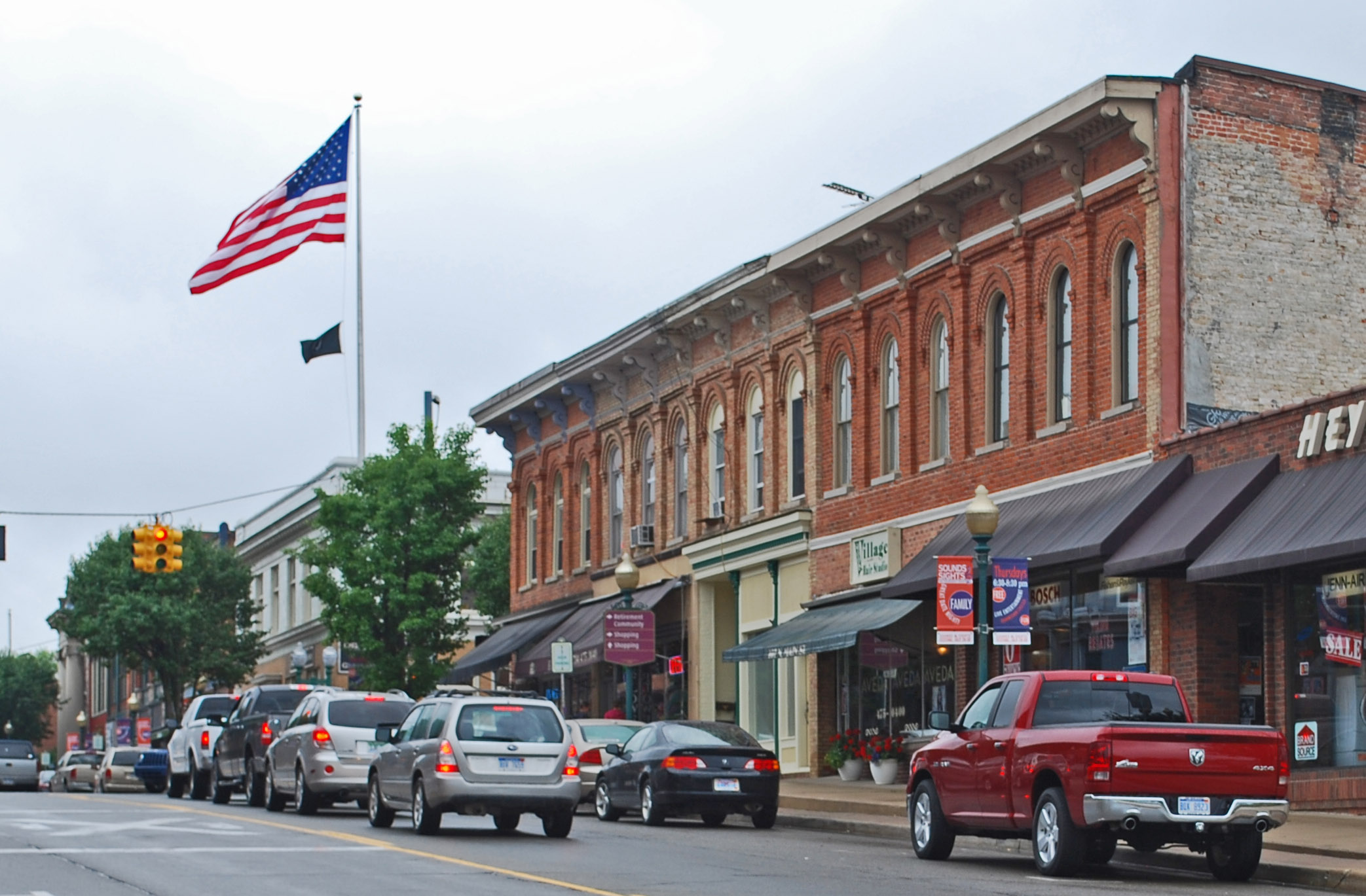
- Main Street at W. Middle

- Location within Michigan Location within the United States
- Interactive map showing Chelsea’s Historic District
- Location: Main St. and adjacent sections of Middle, Park, Jackson, East, and Orchard Sts., Chelsea, Michigan
- Coordinates: 42°19′5″N 84°1′13″W
- Built: 1800s
- NRHP reference No.: 11000046
- Added to NRHP: February 22, 2011

The Chelsea Commercial Historic District is a historic district located along both sides of Main Street from Orchard to North Street in Chelsea, Michigan; the district also includes the adjacent 100 blocks of Jackson, East Middle, and West Middle Streets, as well as structures on Park, East, and Orchard Streets. It was listed on the National Register of Historic Places in 2011.

== History ==
The land where the village of Chelsea now sits was first settled in the 1830s by brothers Elisha and James Congdon. In 1848, the Congdons offered the Michigan Central Railroad a plot of land along the rail line on which to build a station. The railroad accepted, and the first structure built at the site was a freight station, completed in 1850. The Congdons platted the village of Chelsea in the fall of that year, and the first public buildings - a blacksmith shop and a hotel - were built soon after. A series of freight stations was built on the site, and the resulting freight business through the town spurred the growth of Chelsea in the mid-1800s. Additional schools, churches, and businesses were built in the area around the depot in the 1850s and 1860s. As the village grew, a thriving commercial district sprang up south of the railroad tracks. The early buildings were wooden, but after a series of disastrous fires in the 1870s, the current brick structures were built.

== Historical district description ==
The Chelsea Commercial Historic District begins on the north side of Main Street at the Michigan Central Railroad tracks and the Glazier Stoveworks, and continues southward. to include the bulk of the historic downtown area of the village. The district is primarily commercial in nature, but also includes public and religious buildings and a few private homes.

== Significant structures ==
The Chelsea Commercial Historic District contains 61 contributing structures on or near Main Street. It significantly includes the Longworth Complex, a commercial building housing the Chelsea House Livery Stable, the Daniels Showroom, The Merkel Block, and the Mack Building. The district also includes the Glazier Stove Works, the McKune Memorial Library, a structure that formerly served as the post office, the Rockwell Building on East Street, the First United Methodist Church on Park Street, and several other churches.

=== Glazier Stove Company Warehouse and Clocktower Building ===
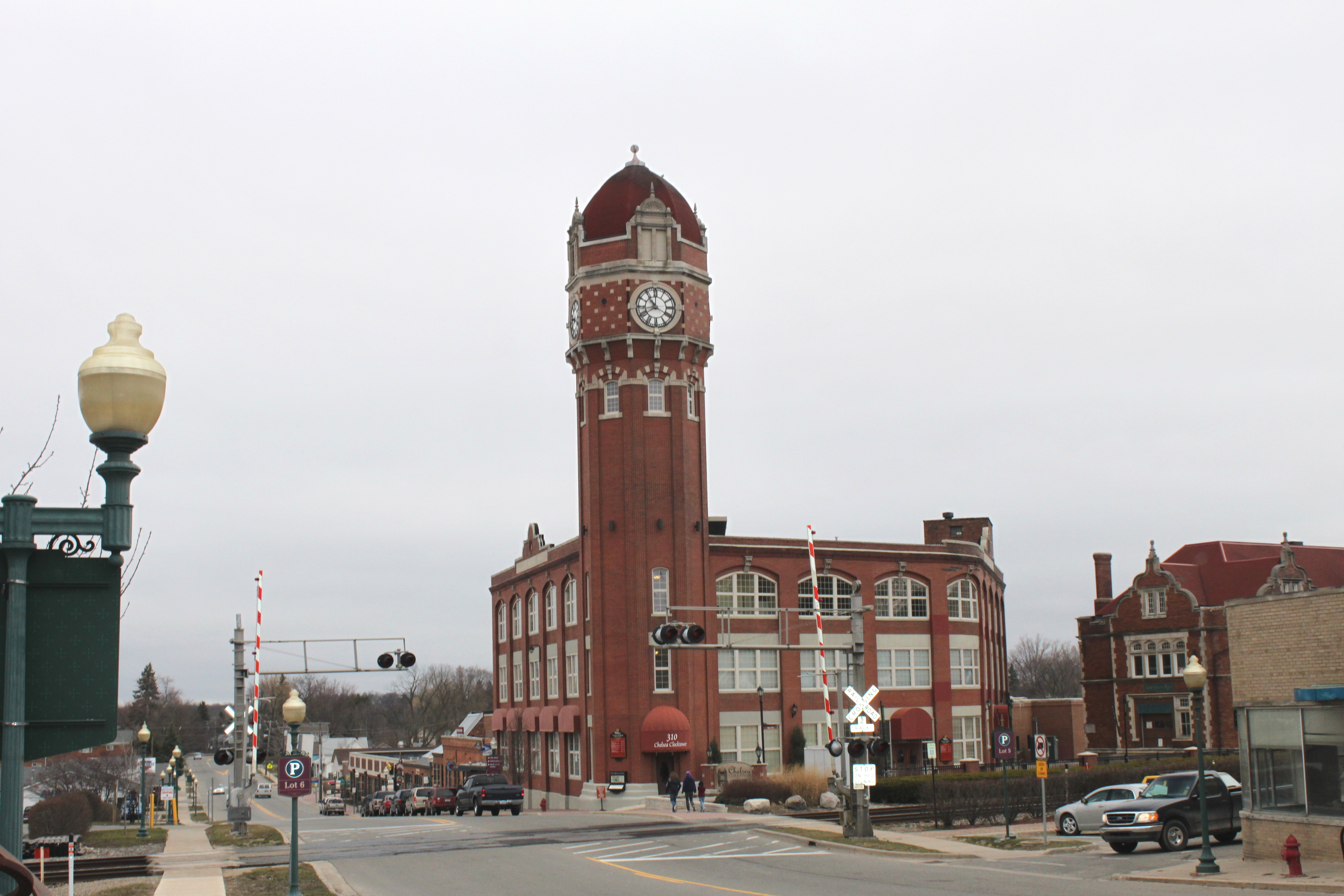
Glazier Stove Company Warehouse

The Glazier Stove Company Warehouse and Clocktower Building is an industrial building located at 310 N. Main Street. It was designated a Michigan State Historic Site in 1997.

The Warehouse is a three-story rectangular Jacobethan Revival structure built of dark red brick. It was constructed using the Kahn System of reinforced concrete building construction. The prominent clocktower, originally designed as an architectural feature to hold the building's industrial water tower, is one of the most visible landmarks in the city.

The Glazier Stove Company was owned by Frank Porter Glazier, who guided the company to become a large and profitable firm in the construction of stoves. He hired Ionia, Michigan architect Caire Allen to design this building. However, the company and Glazier went bankrupt in 1907, in large part due to questionable financial dealings on Glazier's part, for which he was convicted of three counts of embezzlement in 1908.

As of 2013, it was part of the "Chelsea Clocktower" mixed-use redevelopment of retail and office space.

=== Welfare Building ===
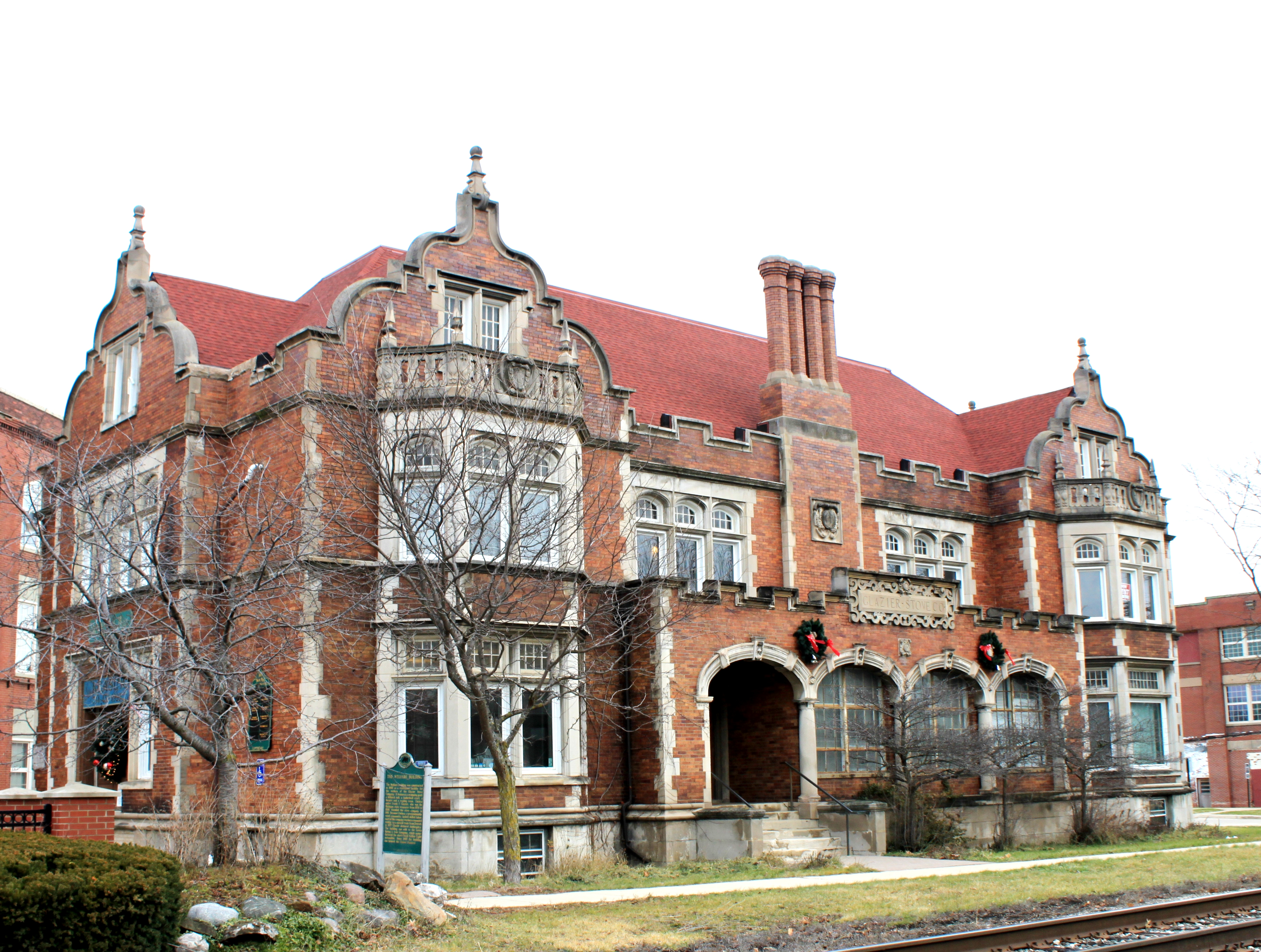
Welfare Building, 2012

The Welfare Building is a recreational building located at 130 N. Main Street. It was designated a Michigan State Historic Site in 1979.

The Welfare Building is a Postmedieval English style building built of brick. It was originally constructed to hold a swimming pool, a billiard hall, a basketball court, a theater and a reading room.

The Welfare building was constructed in 1906 by Frank P. Glazier as a recreation facility for his workers. He hired Ionia, Michigan architect Caire Allen to design this building. The company went bankrupt the next year, and the building was sold to the Lewis Spring & Axle Company, manufacturer of the Hollier Eight automobile. In 1960, the local newspaper, the Chelsea Standard, moved in.

=== Rockwell Building ===
The Rockwell Building is a commercial building located at 310 East Street. As of 2013, it was part of the "Chelsea Clocktower" mixed-use redevelopment of retail and office space.

=== Michigan Central Railroad Chelsea Depot ===
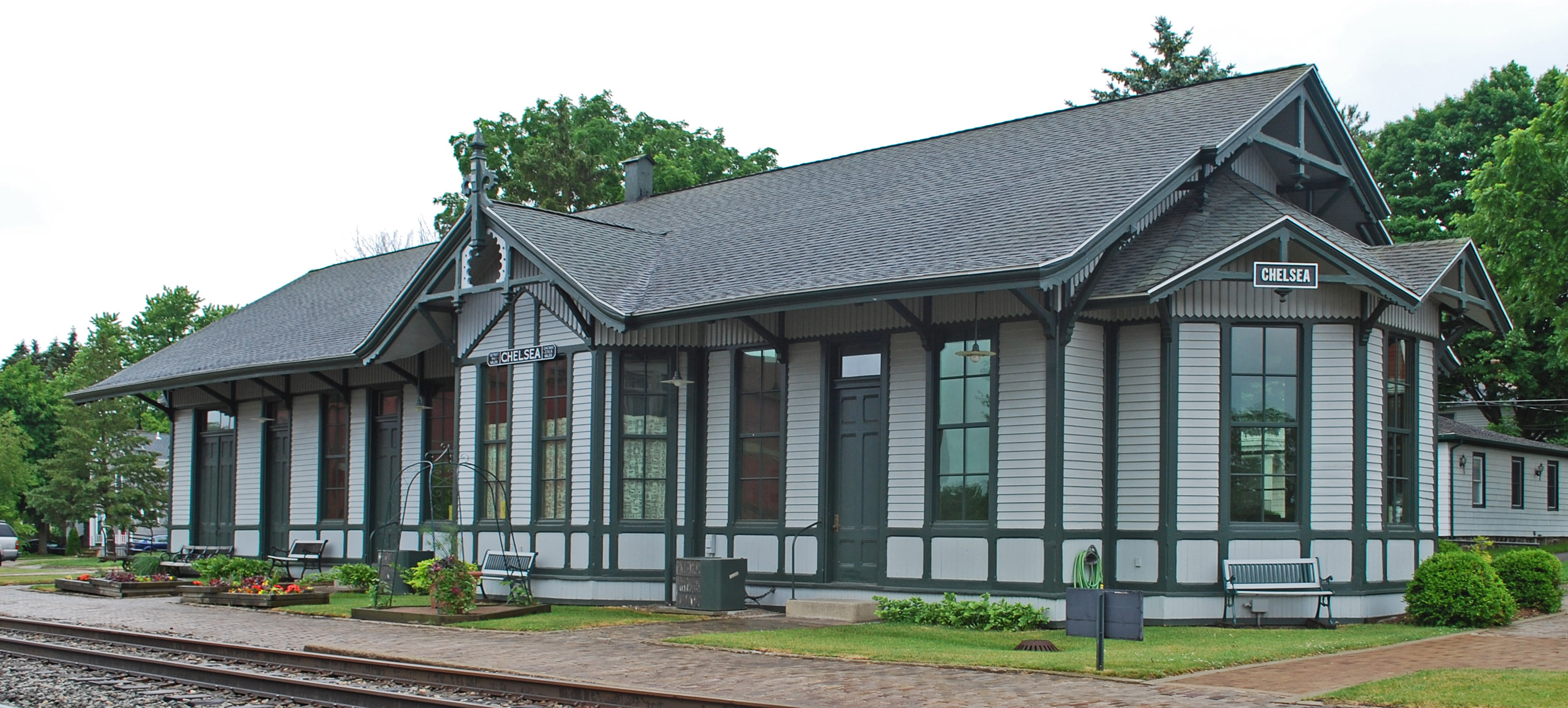
Michigan Central Railroad Depot

The Michigan Central Railroad Chelsea Depot is a railroad depot located at 150 Jackson Street. It was designated a Michigan State Historic Site in 1986 and listed on the National Register of Historic Places in 1987.

It is a single story Stick style Late Victorian design, with multiple gables and gingerbread decoration. Most of the structure is covered with horizontal clapboard, but the gable ends are covered with vertical board and batten. A brick patio surrounds the building. With the exception of some changes to the chimney structure and missing roof crests and finial, the depot's exterior looks exactly like it did when constructed.

The station was built in 1880, when the railroad decided to establish passenger service in Chelsea. The railroad commissioned Detroit architects Mason and Rice to design the new station, and it served as a Michigan Central Railroad passenger station until 1975, when the company went out of business. Amtrak took over the line and continued service until 1981, when the station was closed. For the next few years, the station was used for storage. In 1985, a group of Chelsea citizens formed the Chelsea Depot Association and purchased the depot to prevent the deterioration of the structure. They began restoration efforts in 1986, and the depot was listed on the National Register of Historic Places in 1987. The building has since been used as a rental space for community and private functions, and the Chelsea Depot Association continues to maintain it.

=== Longworth Complex ===
The Longworth Complex is a complex of three connected commercial building located at the corner of Main and Jackson Streets. The complex is composed of three separate buildings: the Chelsea House Livery Stable, the Daniels Showroom, and the Mack Building.

The Chelsea House Livery Stable is a two-story structure located at 110 Jackson Street. It was built from concrete blocks cast on-site, and contains 10,200 square feet (950 m^{2}) of space. It was built in 1905-1906 as a place for travelers on the nearby train line to stable horses. It was later converted into a shop for the next-door auto dealership, housed in the Mack Building/Daniels Showroom. The building was vacant for years; in 2008 the Chelsea Downtown Development Authority purchased it and proposed demolition.

The Art Moderne Daniels Showroom was a single-story, 760-square-foot (71 m^{2}) structure located at 118 N. Main Street. It was built in 1947 as an addition to the Mack Building. With large glass panes facing the street, it was used as an auto showroom. The building was vacant for years; in 2008 the Chelsea Downtown Development Authority purchased it and proposed its demolition. It was demolished in October 2012.

The Mack Building is a two-story, 7,600-square-foot (710 m^{2}) structure located at 102 Jackson Street. It was built in 1901. After demolition of the attached Daniels Showroom in 2012, it was planned to restore the facade of the Mack Building to its historic character.

=== George W. Palmer House ===
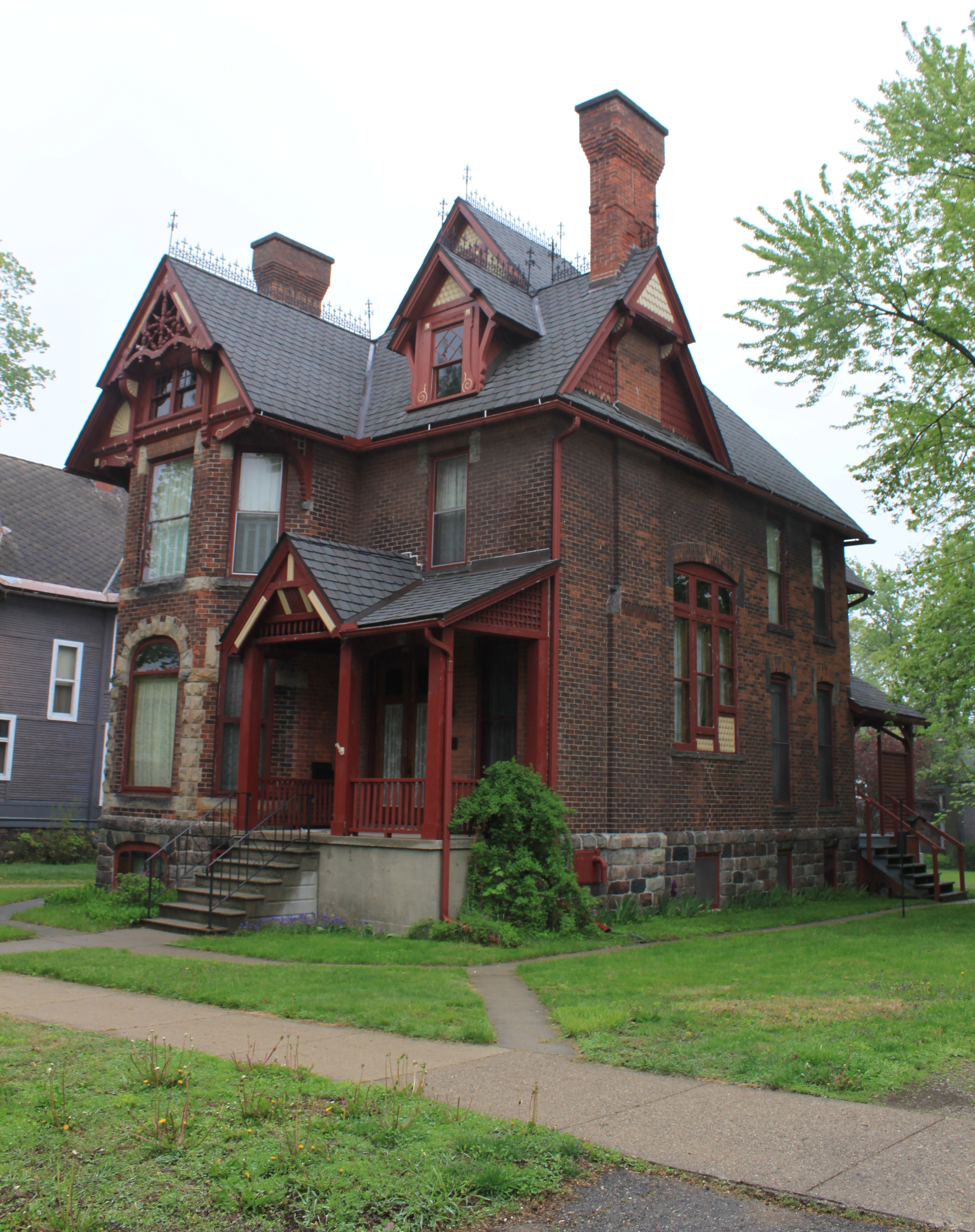
George W Palmer House

The George W. Palmer House, also known as the Chelsea Private Hospital, is a single-family house located at 138 E. Middle Street. It was listed on the National Register of Historic Places in 1996.

The two-story brick-clad structure is an exceptional example of a brick Queen Anne single-family home. The L-shaped house is topped with a hip roof with cross gables and a large gabled hood over the front facade. The brickwork contains areas of offset and soldiered bricks, as well as stone window detailing and quoins, making interesting variation in color and texture.

The house was constructed in 1888 for physician George W. Palmer. In 1905, Daniel Charles McLaren, a prominent local businessman and village president, bought the house. In 1936, a small private hospital, known as Chelsea Private Hospital, moved into the building. After the hospital closed in 1942, the house served as a rooming house for women working in local defense industries. It then operated for years as an apartment house with a first-floor chiropractic clinic. It was purchased in 1991 by John L. and Jacquelyn Frank, who restored the structure as a single-family home.

=== First Congregational Church of Chelsea ===
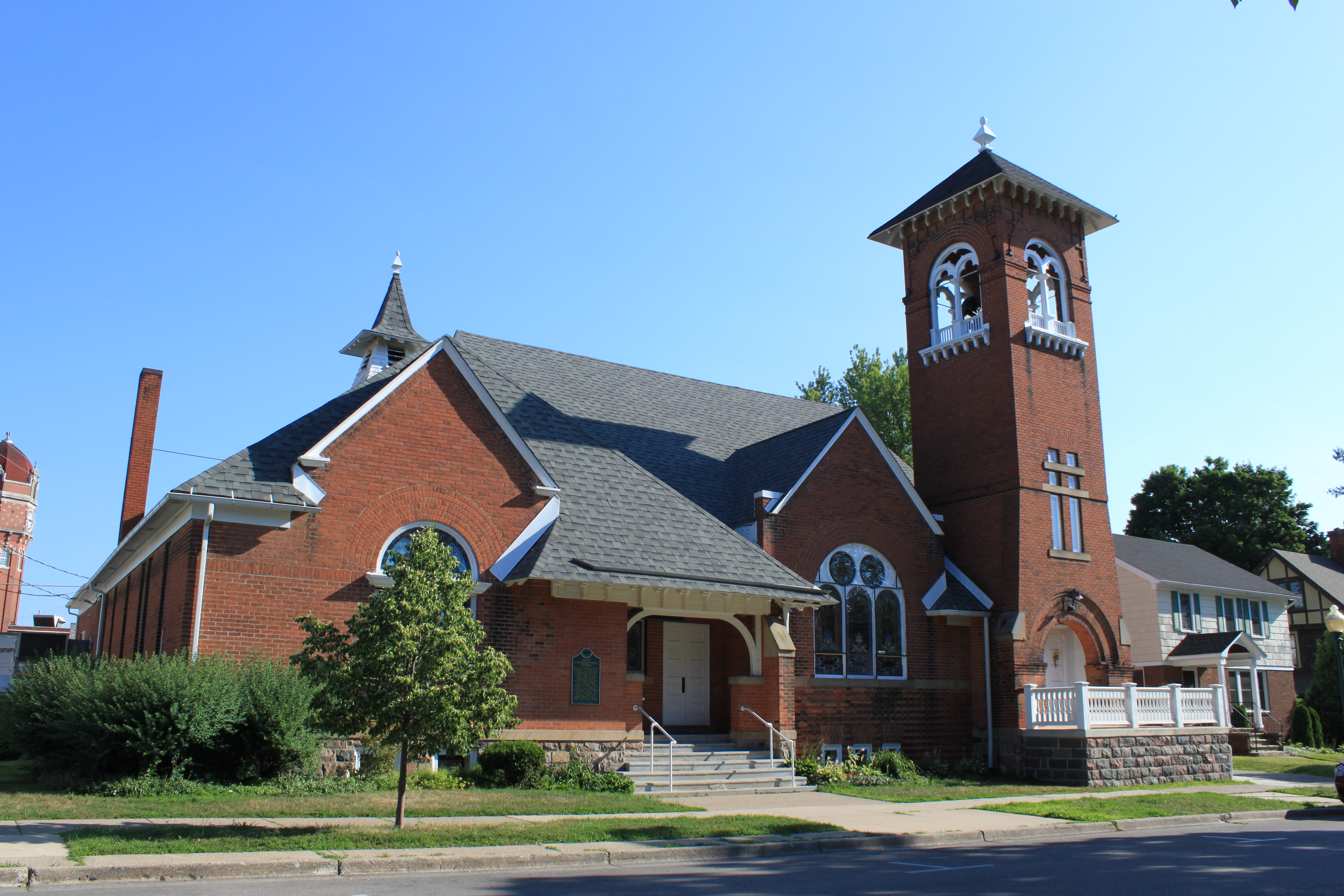
First Congregational Church of Chelsea

The First Congregational Church is a church building located at 121 Middle Street. It was designated a Michigan State Historic Site in 1995.

It is a well-preserved example of a Romanesque/Italian structure designed by Sidney J. Osgood. It is a red brick structure trimmed with stone, sitting on a fieldstone foundation. It has a gable-roof auditorium with attached hip roof fellow ship hall ad office sections.

The First Congregational Church of Chelsea was first organized in 1849. The congregation constructed a church on this site in 1849, which was used until 1894 when it was destroyed by fire. The present structure, designed by Grand Rapids architect Sidney J. Osgood, was constructed to replace it. The building was dedicated in 1895.

=== George P. Glazier Memorial Building ===
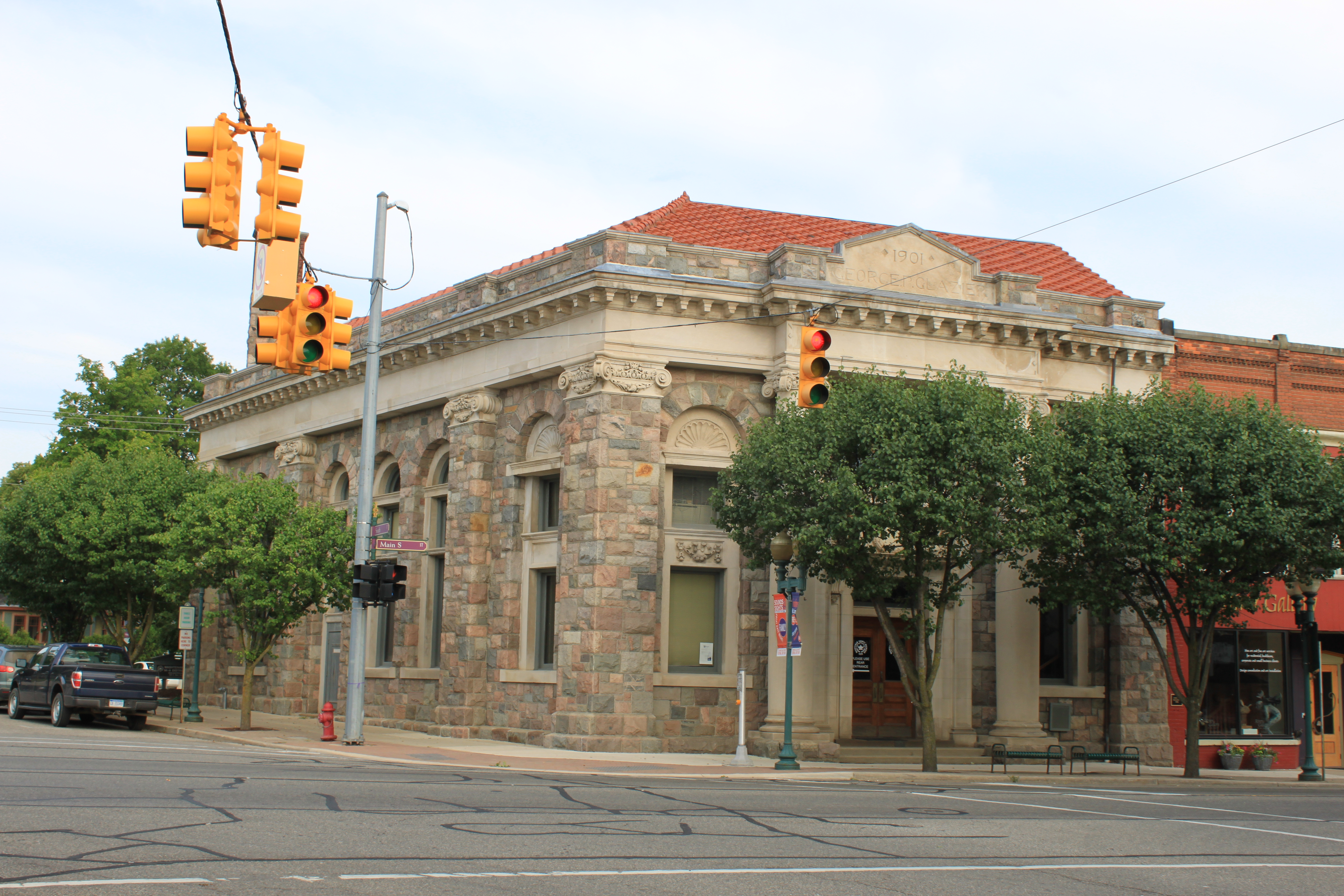
Glazier Memorial Building

The George P. Glazier Memorial Building is a commercial building located at 122 S. Main Street. It was designated a Michigan State Historic Site in 1986.

The Glazier Memorial Building is a two-story trapezoidal French Renaissance structure, built from rockfaced fieldstone trimmed with limestone. It has a truncated hip roof covered with red terra cotta tile. Large piers with Ionic capitals line the principal facade, and a small portico supported with matching Ionic columns covers the main entrance. The facade is capped with an entablature containing large modillions and a cornice above.

The Glazier Memorial Building was constructed in 1901-1902 by Frank P. Glazier to honor his father, George P. Glazier; the original construction cost was $60,000. Glazier hired Ionia, Michigan architect Caire Allen to design the building. The building originally housed the Chelsea Savings Bank, founded by George P. Glazier and later led by his son Frank. As of 2013, it houses an office of the 14th district court.

=== Post office ===
The former post office building is located at the corner of Main and South Streets. The post office opened in the late 1930s. It moved to a new location later, and as of 2012 a restaurant was planned for the building.

=== First United Methodist Church ===
The First United Methodist Church is a religious building located at 128 Park Street. It is a stone structure.

The Methodist congregation in Chelsea was established in 1853, and by 1859, a wooden church had been built at the site of the current structure. The wooden church was used until 1899, when it burned. The current church was built in 13 months at a cost of $6000, and dedicated in February 1900. The congregation grew through the next century, and wings were added to the building in 1963 and 1996. The building continues to be used by the church.

=== McKune Memorial Library ===
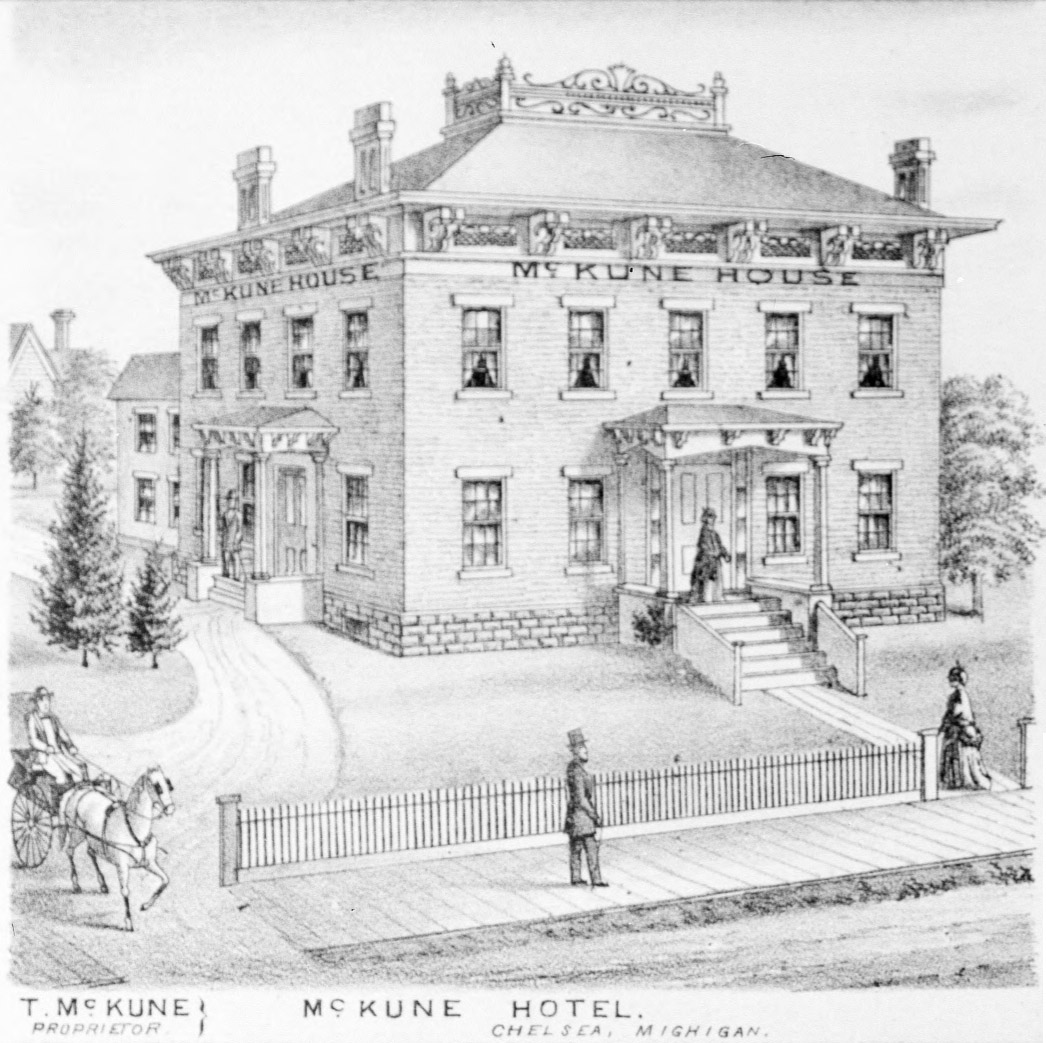
McKune House Hotel, c. 1874

The McKune Memorial Library, also known as the McKune House, is a public building located at 221 South Main Street.

Elisha Congdon was one of Chelsea's first residents, arriving in 1832. He built a log house on this spot at that time; the log house burned down in 1849, and Congdon replaced it with a frame structure. In 1860, he moved the frame house and built this brick structure in its place. Congdon lived in the house until he died in 1867. In 1870, businessman Timothy McKune purchased the house and converted it into a hotel called the "McKune House Hotel." McKune's son Edward took over the property in 1909, but as the 20th century progressed, the hotel saw less business, and turned into more of a rooming house.

In the 1940s, the Friends of the Chelsea Library was organized, and they began looking for a suitable home for the library. They approached Edward McKune's widow, Katherine Staffan McKune; in 1956 she offered to give the McKune house to the library upon her death. That occurred two years later, in 1958. The Friends of the Chelsea Library did extensive renovation work, and in 1959 the library opened. A wing was added in 1961. The front porch was reconstructed to replicate the original porch in 1995. In 2004, the original building was again renovated, and another wing was constructed.

== Gallery ==
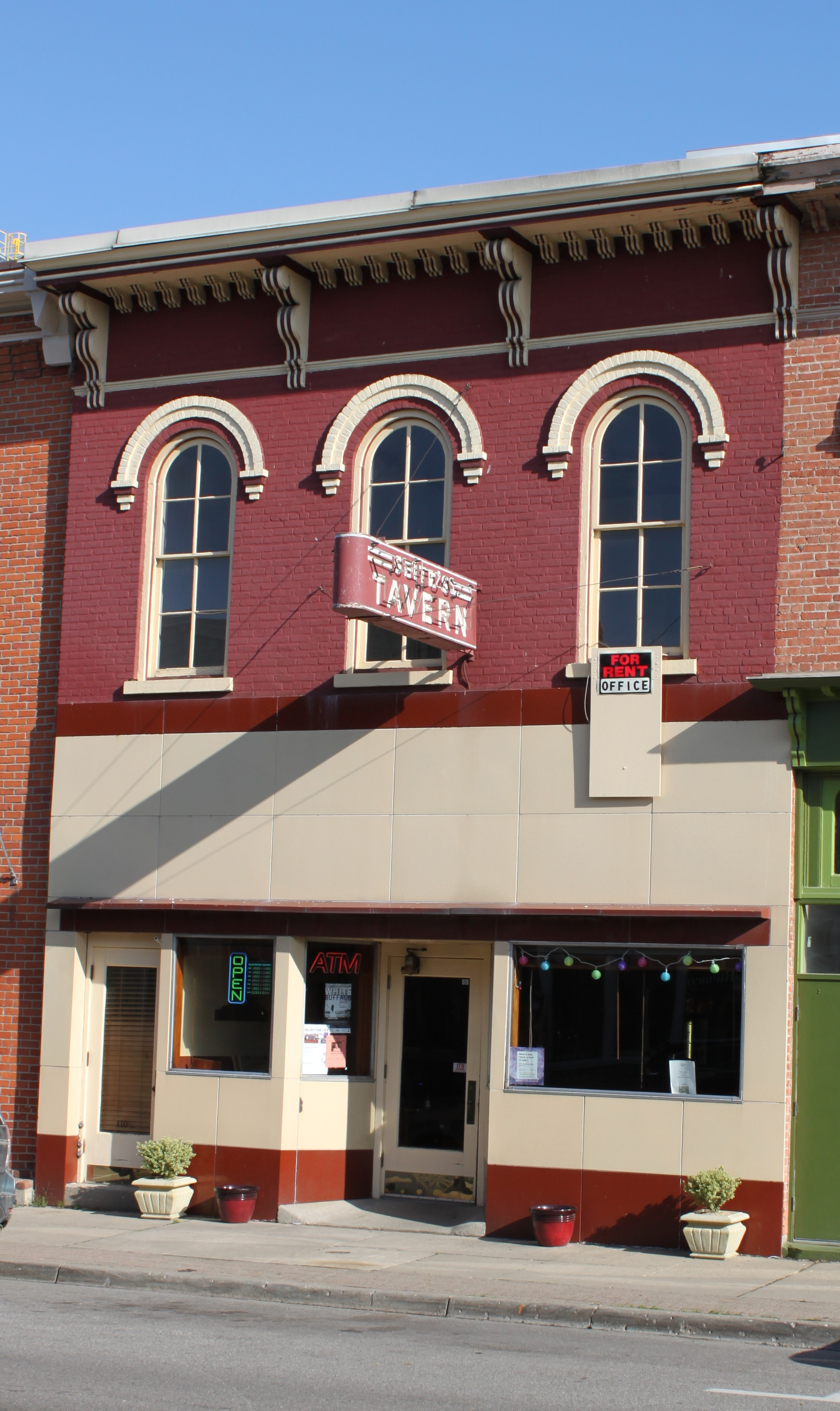
Seitz's Tavern on West Middle St.

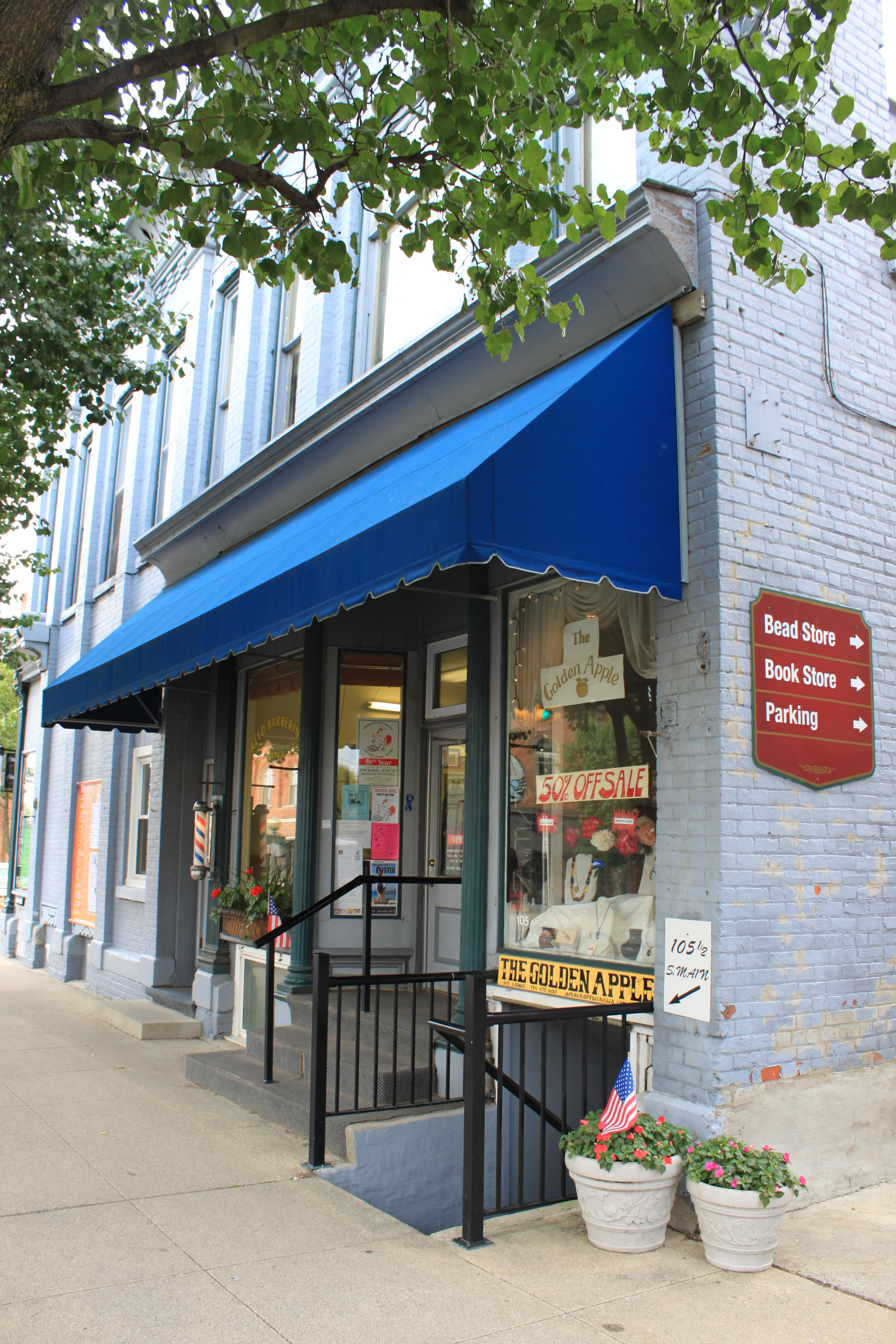
103 S. Main

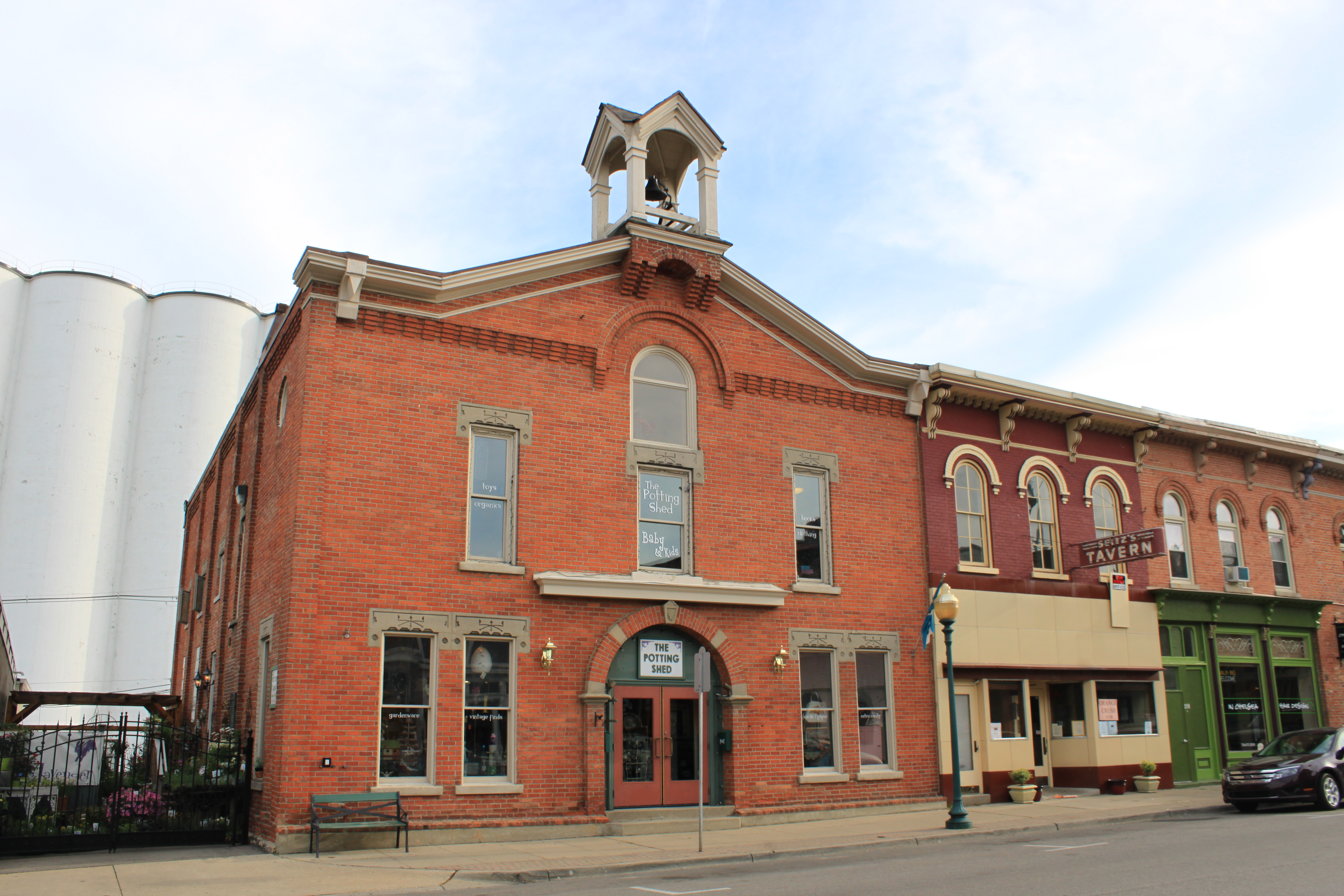
The Potting Shed & Seitz Tavern, 112 & 110 West Middle Street

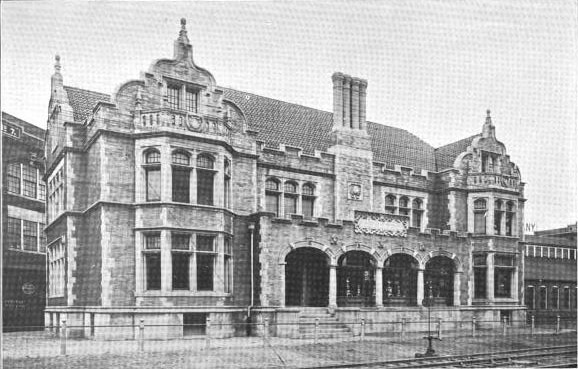
Welfare Building Chelsea MI c. 1915
