= Sylvan Township, Washtenaw County, Michigan =

Sylvan Township, Michigan
- Civil township
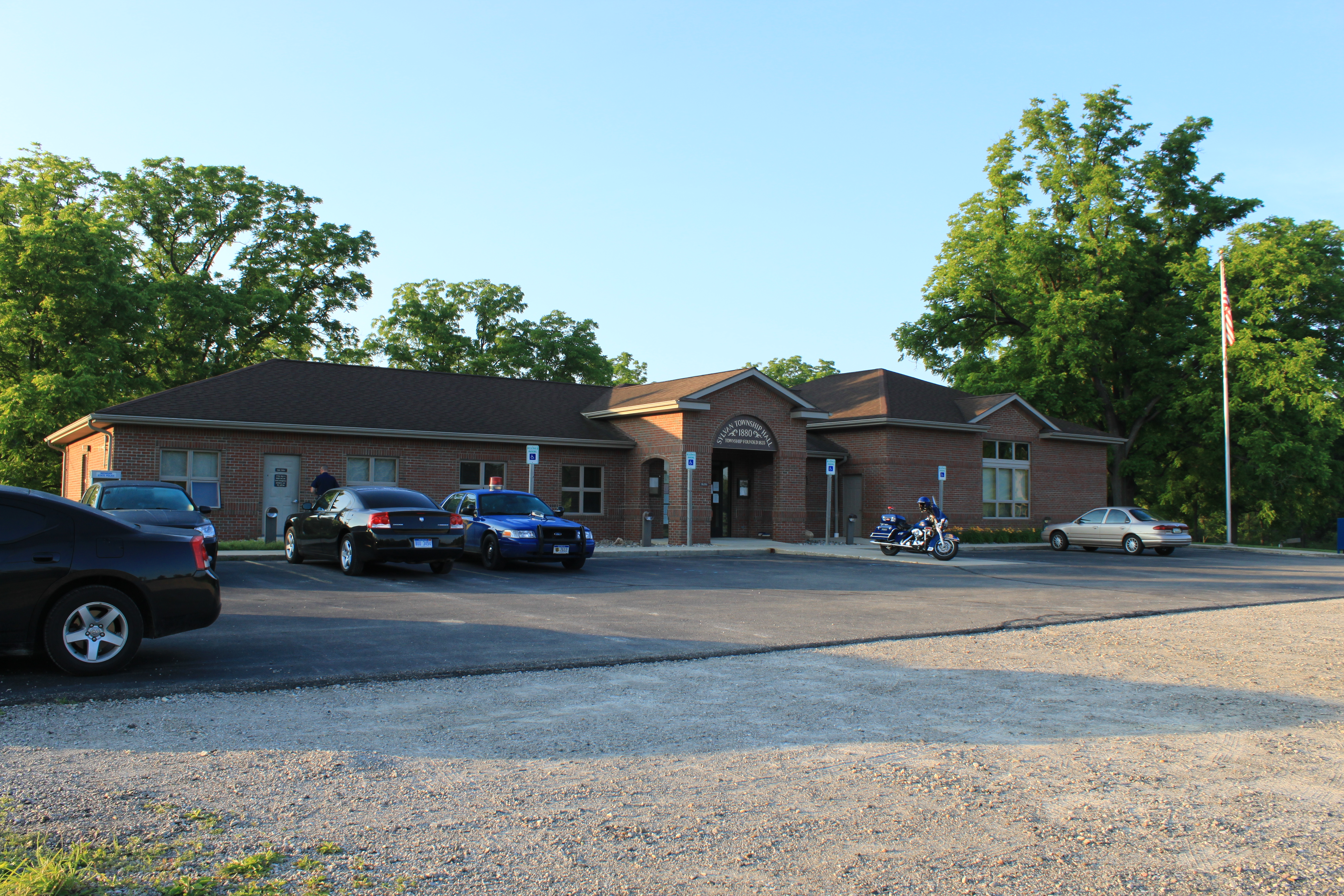
- Township Hall and police station on US-12

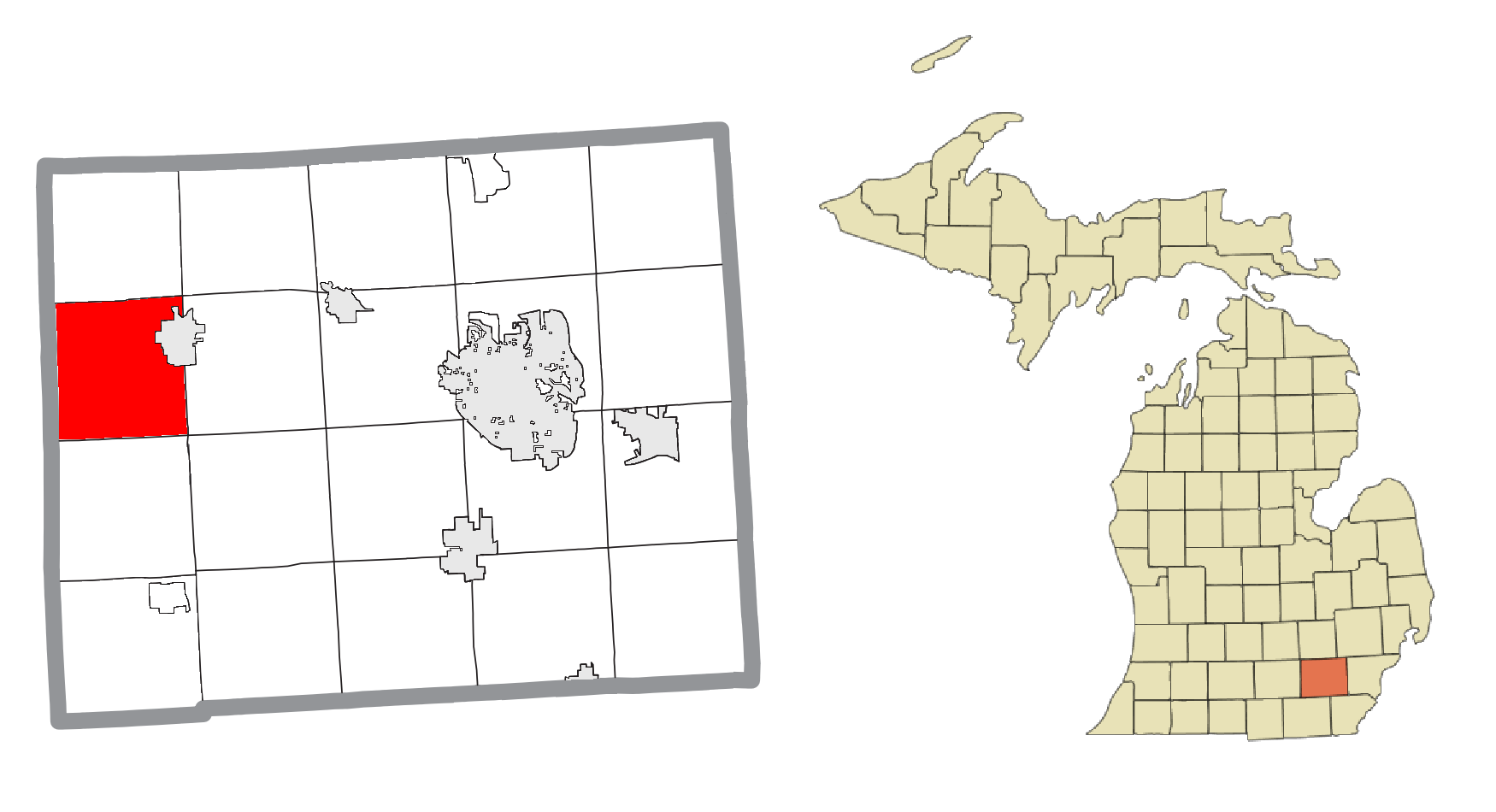
- Location within Washtenaw County

- Location within the state of Michigan Location within the United States
- Coordinates: 42°18′10″N 84°03′29″W
- Country: United States
- State: Michigan
- County: Washtenaw
- Established: 1834

Government
  - Supervisor: Kathleen Kennedy
  - Clerk: Amanda Nimke

Area
  - Total: 33.96 sq mi (87.96 km^{2})
  - Land: 32.59 sq mi (84.41 km^{2})
  - Water: 1.37 sq mi (3.55 km^{2})
- Elevation: 935 ft (285 m)

Population (2020)
  - Total: 3,311
  - Density: 101.6/sq mi (39.23/km^{2})
- Time zone: UTC-5 (Eastern (EST))
  - Summer (DST): UTC-4 (EDT)
- ZIP code(s): 48118 (Chelsea); 49240 (Grass Lake)
- Area code: 734
- FIPS code: 26-77800
- GNIS feature ID: 1627148
- Website: Official website

Sylvan Township is a civil township of Washtenaw County in the U.S. state of Michigan. The population was 3,311 at the 2020 census. The population was overall a large decrease from 6,425 at the 2000 census, which was due to Chelsea incorporating into a city in 2004.

== Communities ==
- Guthrie is an unincorporated community located within the township at 42°18′09″N 84°04′09″W.
- Kavanaugh Lake is a former community that existed within the township. It very briefly had a rural post office from February 13, 1893 until January 6, 1894. The lake itself is spelled differently as Cavanaugh Lake within the northwest section of the township.
- Notten is an unincorporated community located within the township at 42°16′43″N 84°07′24″W.
- Pierceville is a former settlement that was first settled in 1834. It was named after Nathan Pierce, who became the township's first supervisor when Sylvan Township was organized that same year. A post office operated in Pierceville from May 2, 1835 until January 8, 1841. It was bypassed by future railroad development, and the community was eventually abandoned.
- Sylvan Center is an unincorporated community located within the township at 42°17′10″N 84°04′40″W. A post office opened under the name Sylvan on July 8, 1834. The township itself was established around the same time and so named after the wife of early settler Edmund Conkling. The new community was named Sylvan Center due to its central location within the new township. The post office operated until August 31, 1892. It was restored from March 3, 1893 until June 14, 1902.

== Geography ==
According to the U.S. Census Bureau, the township has a total area of 33.96 square miles (87.96 km^{2}), of which 32.59 square miles (84.41 km^{2}) is land and 1.37 square miles (3.55 km^{2}) (4.03%) is water.

Portions of the Waterloo State Recreation Area are located in the northwest section of the township. The Goose Lake State Game Area is located in the southwest corner of the township. The Border-to-Border Trail runs very briefly through the township just north of the city of Chelsea.

=== Major highways ===
- I-94 runs east–west through the center of the township.
- M-52 runs south–north along the eastern edge of the township and has a junction with Interstate 94 before entering Chelsea

== Demographics ==
As of the census of 2000, there were 6,425 people, 2,500 households, and 1,700 families residing in the township. The population density was 182.7 inhabitants per square mile (70.5/km^{2}). There were 2,651 housing units at an average density of 75.4 per square mile (29.1/km^{2}). The racial makeup of the township was 97.17% White, 0.67% African American, 0.31% Native American, 0.51% Asian, 0.05% Pacific Islander, 0.26% from other races, and 1.03% from two or more races. Hispanic or Latino of any race were 1.28% of the population.

There were 2,500 households, out of which 33.0% had children under the age of 18 living with them, 56.7% were married couples living together, 8.9% had a female householder with no husband present, and 32.0% were non-families. 28.9% of all households were made up of individuals, and 15.3% had someone living alone who was 65 years of age or older. The average household size was 2.45 and the average family size was 3.03.

In the township the population was spread out, with 24.7% under the age of 18, 6.0% from 18 to 24, 26.1% from 25 to 44, 24.8% from 45 to 64, and 18.4% who were 65 years of age or older. The median age was 41 years. For every 100 females, there were 91.0 males. For every 100 females age 18 and over, there were 84.6 males.

The median income for a household in the township was $56,519, and the median income for a family was $73,450. Males had a median income of $51,424 versus $35,409 for females. The per capita income for the township was $28,781. About 2.1% of families and 3.0% of the population were below the poverty line, including 2.0% of those under age 18 and 4.6% of those age 65 or over.

== Education ==
Sylvan Township is served entirely by Chelsea School District.

== Images ==
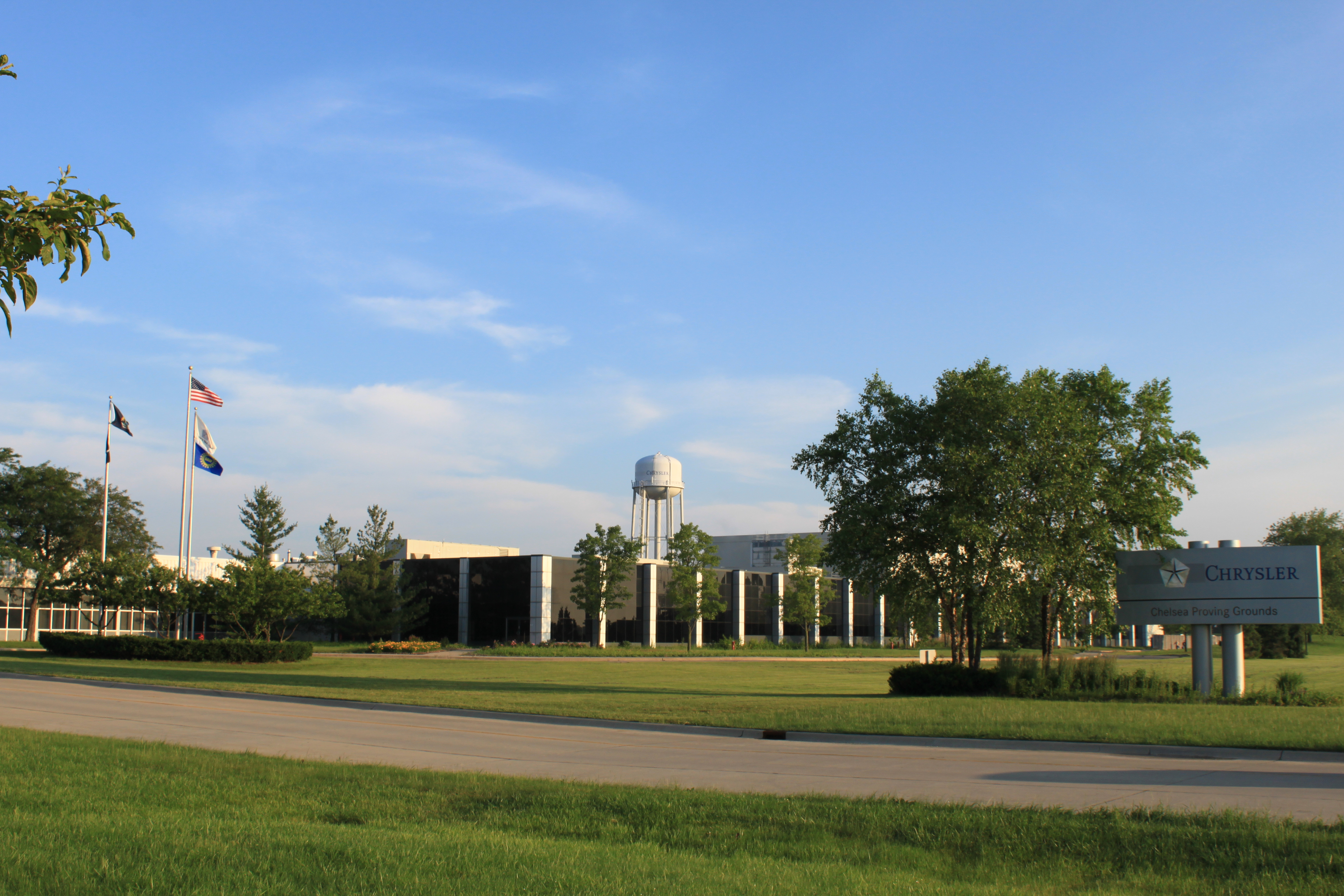
Chrysler Chelsea Proving Grounds

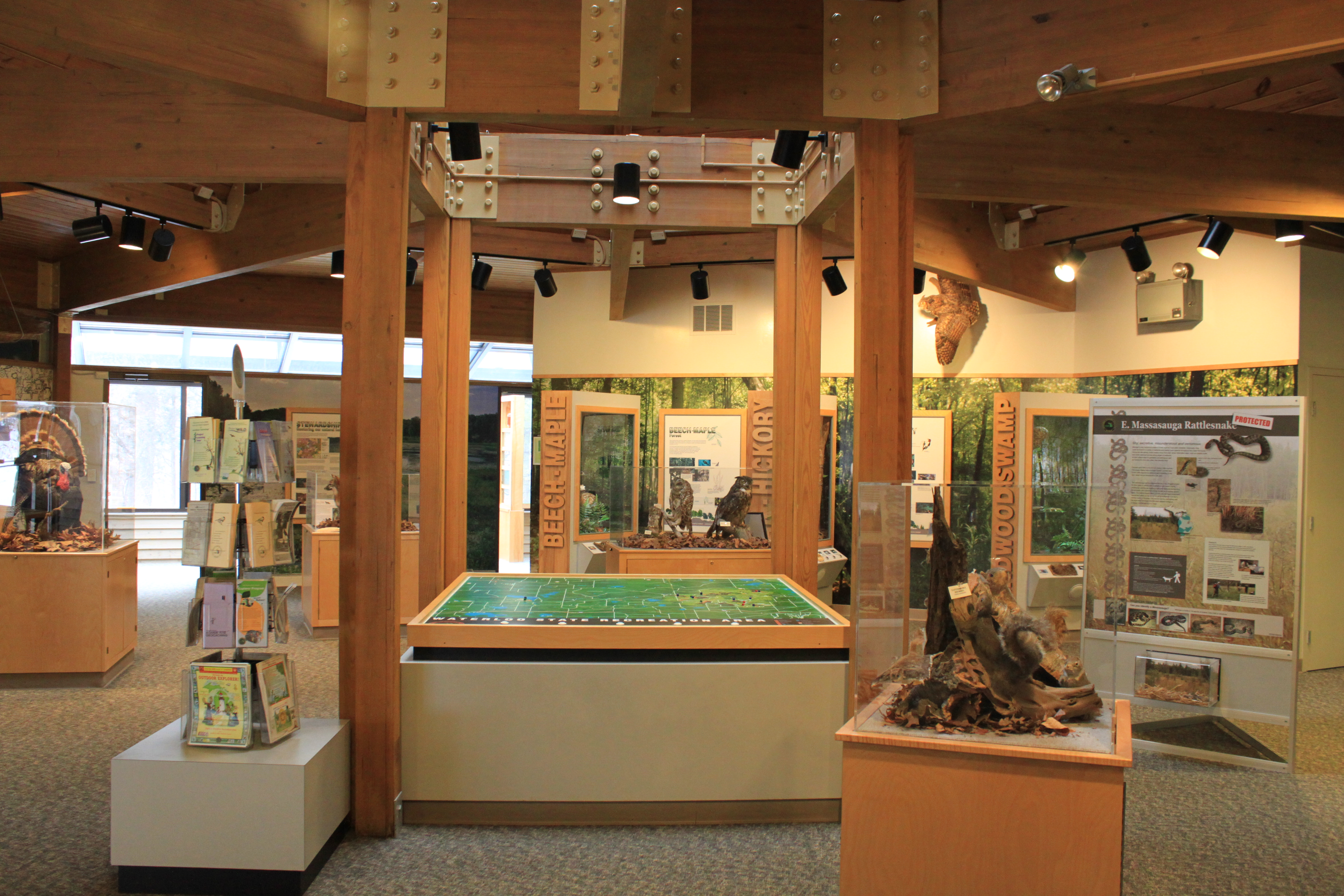
Eddy Discovery Center
(Waterloo State Recreation Area)

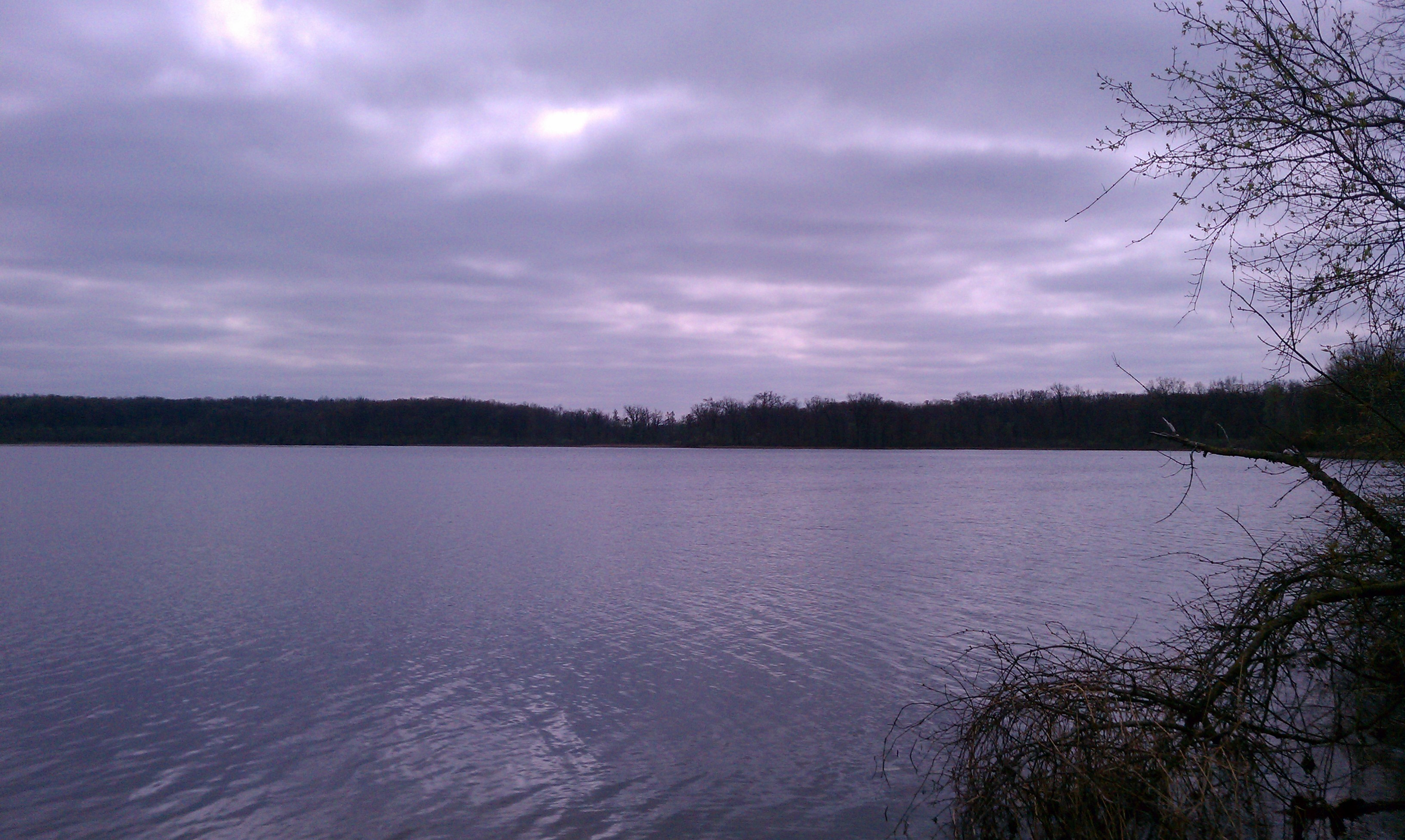
Mill Lake
