= Lima Township, Michigan =

- Civil township
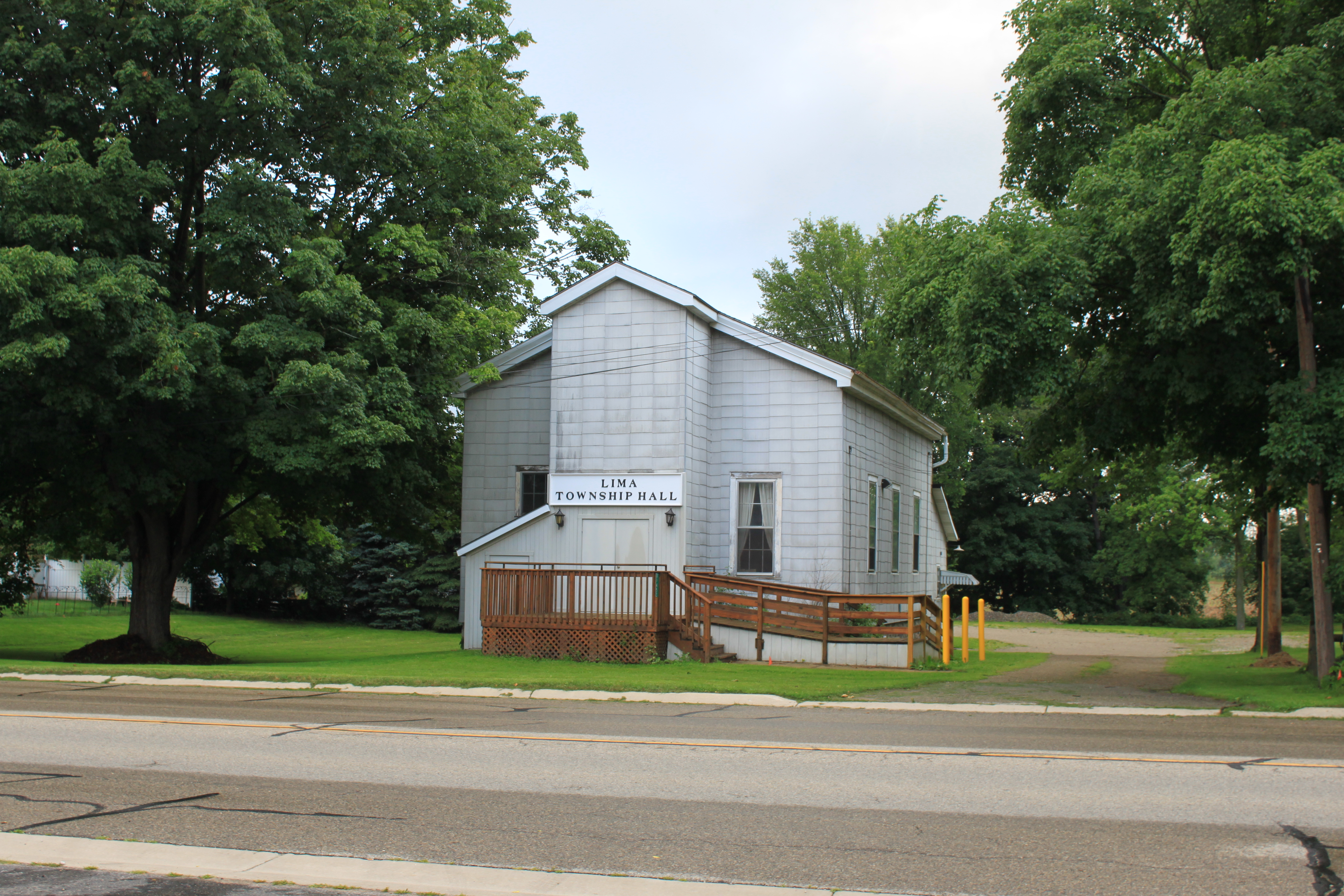
- Township Hall on Jackson Road

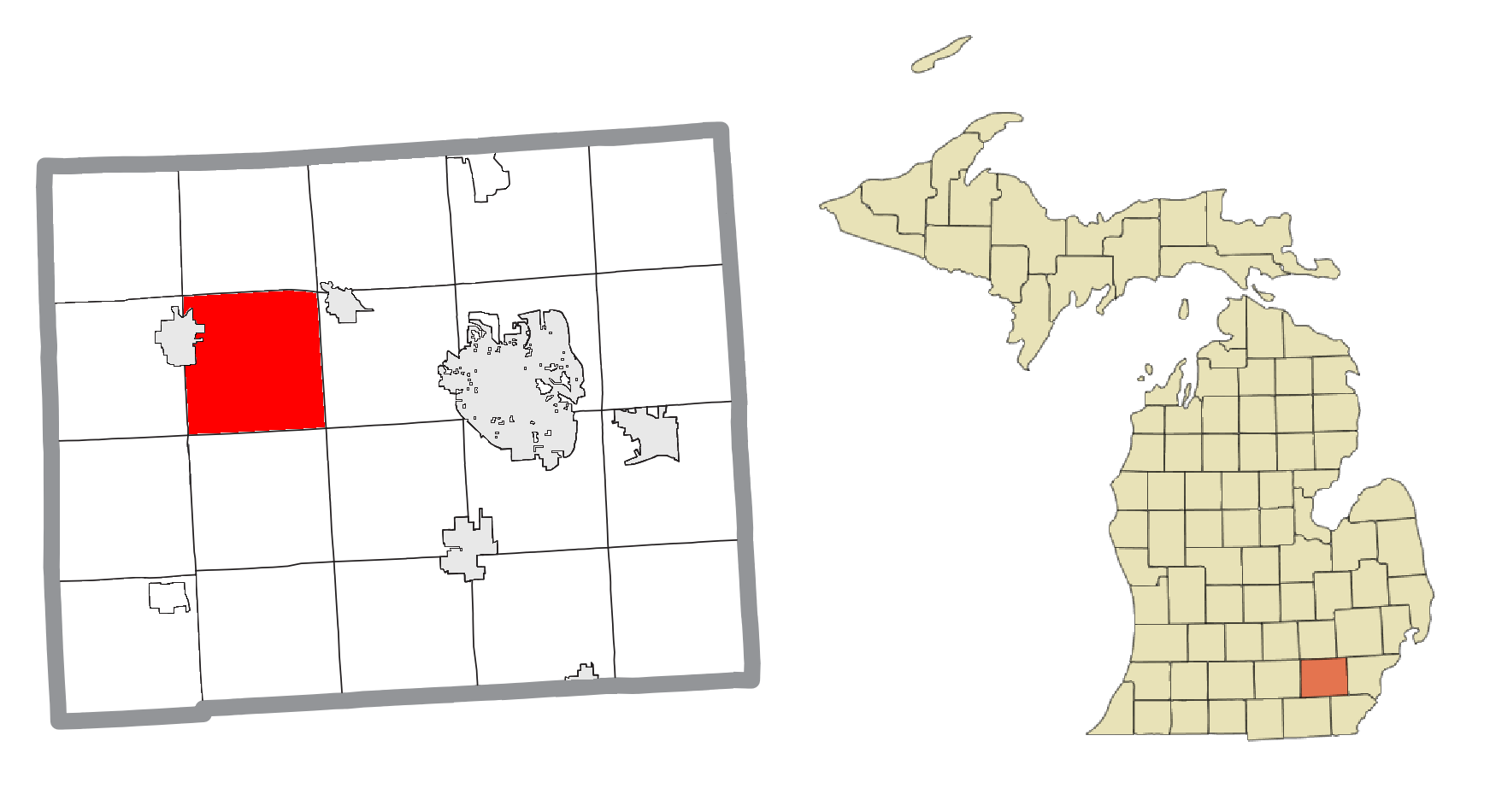
- Location within Washtenaw County

- Location within the state of Michigan Location within the United States
- Coordinates: 42°17′55″N 83°57′57″W
- Country: United States
- State: Michigan
- County: Washtenaw
- Established: 1832

Government
  - Supervisor: Bill VanRiper
  - Clerk: Ann Kwaske

Area
  - Total: 35.20 sq mi (91.17 km^{2})
  - Land: 34.53 sq mi (89.43 km^{2})
  - Water: 0.67 sq mi (1.74 km^{2})
- Elevation: 883 ft (269 m)

Population (2020)
  - Total: 4,024
  - Density: 116.5/sq mi (45.00/km^{2})
- Time zone: UTC-5 (Eastern (EST))
  - Summer (DST): UTC-4 (EDT)
- ZIP code(s): 48103 (Ann Arbor); 48118 (Chelsea); 48130 (Dexter)
- Area code: 734
- FIPS code: 26-47460
- GNIS feature ID: 1626616
- Website: Official website

Lima Township is a civil township of Washtenaw County in the U.S. state of Michigan. The population was 4,024 at the 2020 census.

== Communities ==
- Fourmile Lake is an unincorporated community located within the township near the lake of the same name at 42°19′30″N 83°58′00″W.
- Jerusalem is an unincorporated community located within the township at 42°16′29″N 83°58′55″W. The settlement was platted and named New Jerusalem by John Bingham who built a sawmill along Mill Creek in 1832. Eventually, it was shortened to the name Jerusalem.
- Lima Center is an unincorporated community located in the center of the township at 42°17′45″N 83°57′27″W. William Lemmon purchased the first plot of land here in 1825 when the area was still part of Wayne County in the Michigan Territory until Washtenaw County was established in 1829. Lima Township was organized in 1832, and the settlement became known as Lima Center due to its central location within the new township. A post office under the name Mill Creek opened on February 12, 1833. The post office was soon renamed Lima on May 2, 1834. Mill Creek opened a separate post office aside from Lima from September 29, 1834 until April 28, 1836. The settlement was documented as Mill Creek when it was platted in 1838. The Lima post office remained in operation until August 15, 1901.

== Geography ==
According to the U.S. Census Bureau, the township has a total area of 35.20 square miles (91.17 km^{2}), of which 34.53 square miles (89.43 km^{2}) is land and 0.67 square miles (1.74 km^{2}) (1.90%) is water.

The Border-to-Border Trail runs through the township. The Chelsea State Game Area is located in the northern portion of the township.

=== Major highways ===
- I-94 runs east–west through the center of the township.

== Demographics ==
As of the census of 2020, there were 4,024 people, 1,168 households, and 954 families residing in the township. The population density was 89.0 inhabitants per square mile (34.4/km^{2}). There were 1,198 housing units at an average density of 33.1 per square mile (12.8/km^{2}). The racial makeup of the township was 97.55% White, 0.37% African American, 0.22% Native American, 0.59% Asian, 0.22% from other races, and 1.05% from two or more races. Hispanic or Latino of any race were 0.90% of the population.

There were 1,168 households, out of which 37.1% had children under the age of 18 living with them, 72.1% were married couples living together, 6.5% had a female householder with no husband present, and 18.3% were non-families. 15.1% of all households were made up of individuals, and 6.3% had someone living alone who was 65 years of age or older. The average household size was 2.76 and the average family size was 3.06.

In the township, the population was spread out, with 26.8% under the age of 18, 5.1% from 18 to 24, 25.7% from 25 to 44, 30.9% from 45 to 64, and 11.5% who were 65 years of age or older. The median age was 41 years. For every 100 females, there were 104.2 males. For every 100 females age 18 and over, there were 99.8 males.

The median income for a household in the township was $68,531, and the median income for a family was $75,551. Males had a median income of $60,096 versus $35,288 for females. The per capita income for the township was $30,220. About 1.0% of families and 2.3% of the population were below the poverty line, including 0.9% of those under age 18 and 2.2% of those age 65 or over.

== Education ==
Lima Township is served by two public school districts. The majority of the township is served by Chelsea School District to the west in the city of Chelsea, and the eastern portion of the township is served by Dexter Community School District to the east in Dexter.

== Images ==
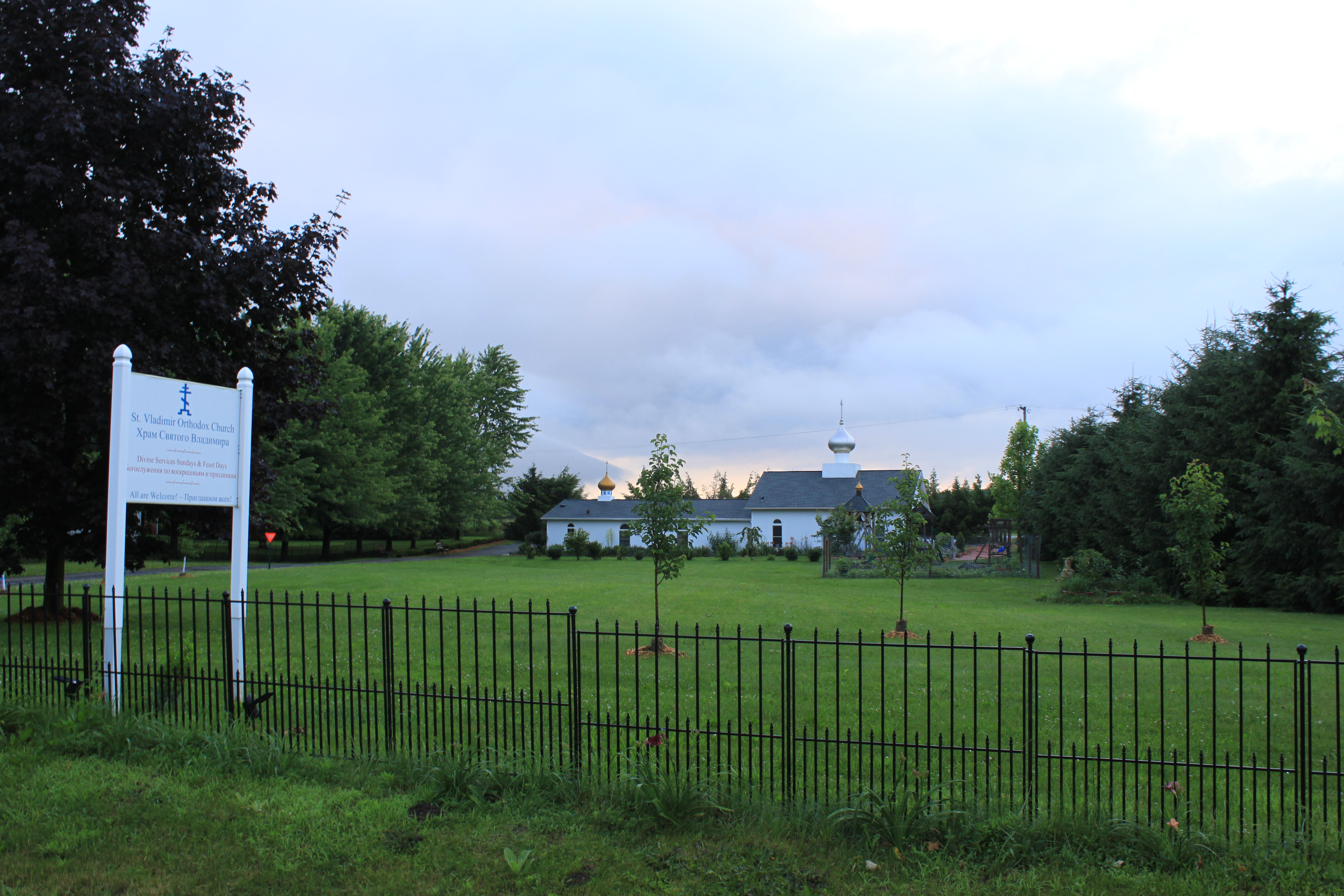
St. Vladimir of Kiev Orthodox Church

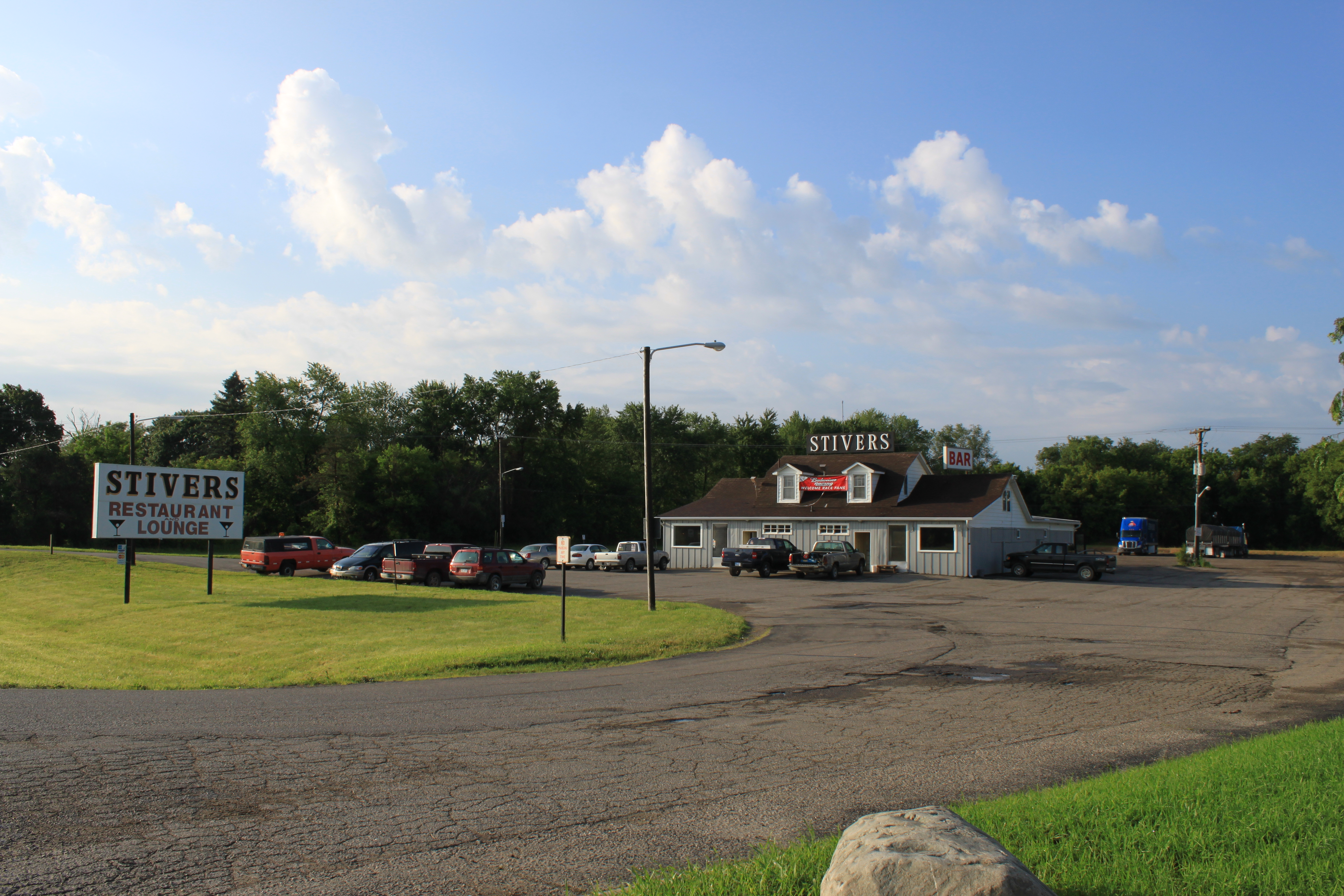
Stivers Restaurant on Fletcher Road

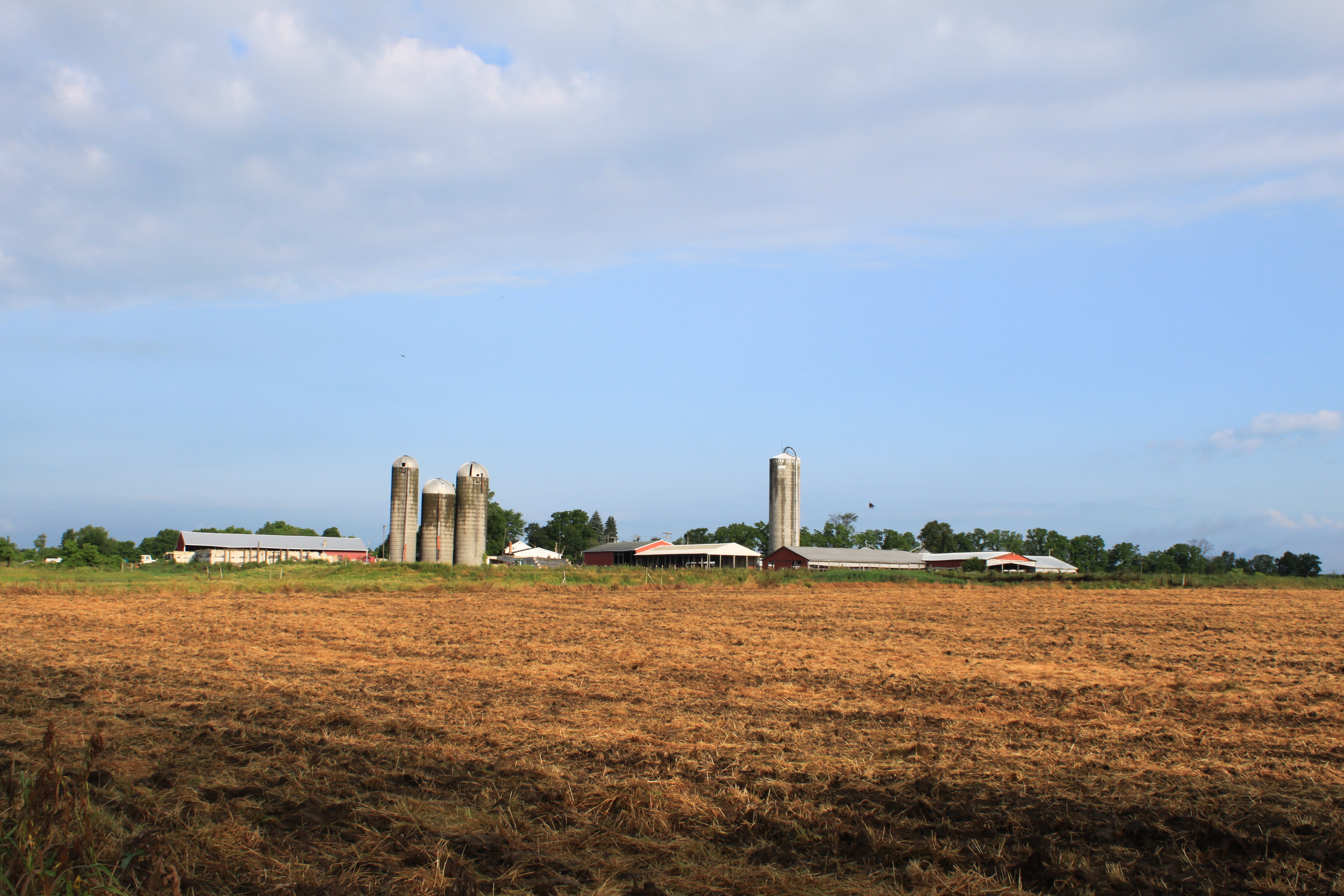
Farmland along Haist Road
