= Chelsea, Michigan =

- City of Chelsea
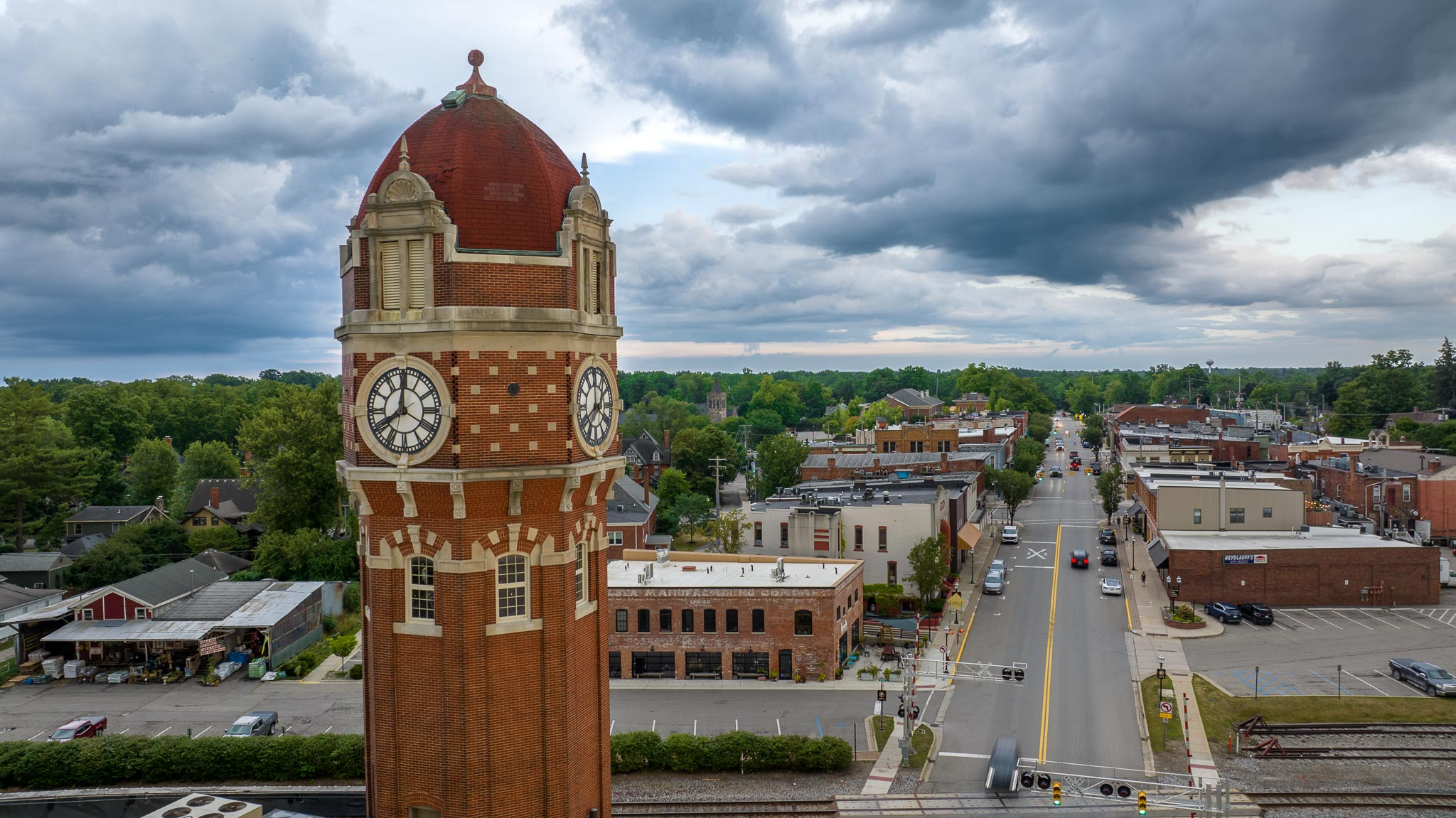

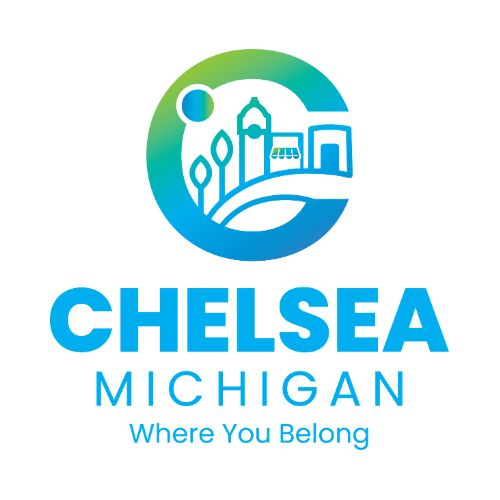
- Seal
- Motto: Where you Belong
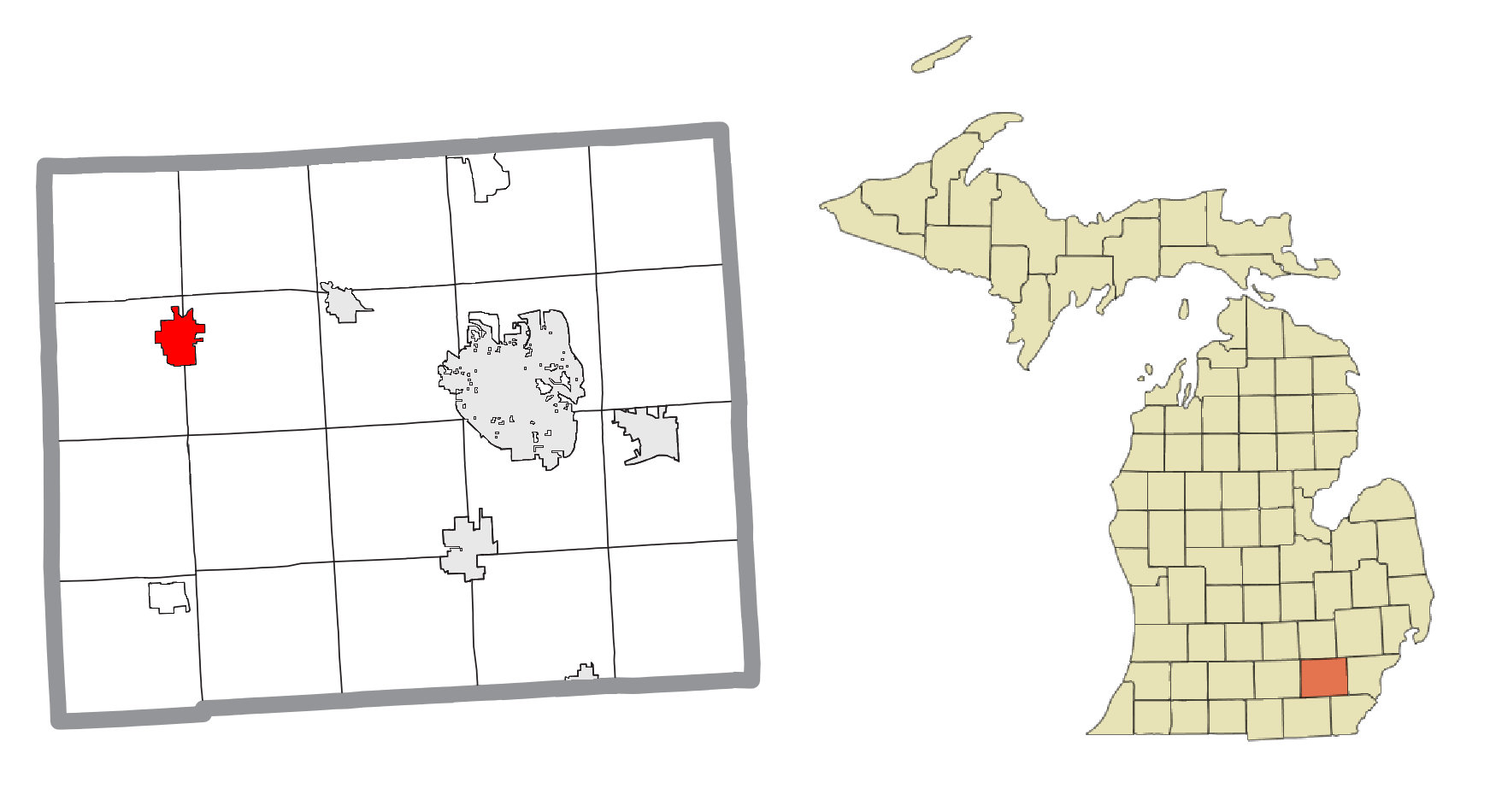
- Location within Washtenaw County

- Location within the state of Michigan Location within the United States
- Coordinates: 42°19′05″N 84°01′13″W
- Country: United States
- State: Michigan
- County: Washtenaw
- Incorporated: 1889 (village); 2004 (city)

Government
  - Type: Council–manager
  - Mayor: Kate Henson
  - Clerk: Lynn Sebestyen

Area
  - Total: 3.67 sq mi (9.50 km^{2})
  - Land: 3.62 sq mi (9.37 km^{2})
  - Water: 0.050 sq mi (0.13 km^{2})
- Elevation: 932 ft (284 m)

Population (2020)
  - Total: 5,467
  - Density: 1,511.7/sq mi (583.68/km^{2})
- Time zone: UTC-5 (Eastern (EST))
  - Summer (DST): UTC-4 (EDT)
- ZIP code(s): 48118
- Area code: 734
- FIPS code: 26-15020
- GNIS feature ID: 0623143
- Website: city-chelsea.org

Chelsea is a city in Washtenaw County in the U.S. state of Michigan. The population was 5,467 at the 2020 census. Located approximately 15 miles west of Ann Arbor, the city is recognized for its vibrant arts community, historic downtown, and strong civic identity. Chelsea also serves as a regional hub for outdoor recreation, due to its proximity to state parks, trails, lakes and rivers.

== History ==
The area was first settled as early as 1820 within the Michigan Territory by settler Cyrus Beckwith. It would be organized as Sylvan Township in 1834. The Michigan Central Railroad constructed a line through the area in 1848, and a post office was first established on January 4, 1849. It was originally named Kendon. The name was changed to Chelsea on July 19, 1850 when the train station opened and community was formally platted. The name Chelsea came from Elisha Congdon, who suggested the name after his hometown of Chelsea, Massachusetts. Chelsea incorporated as a village in 1889. The Chelsea courthouse is housed in a 120-year-old bank building in downtown.

The village of Chelsea incorporated into a city in 2004. In 2011, the downtown area of Chelsea was listed on the National Register of Historic Places as the Chelsea Commercial Historic District.

In April 2025, some 300 residents of the town formed a human chain to help move 9,100 books for a bookstore to a new location.

== Geography ==
According to the U.S. Census Bureau, the city has a total area of 3.67 square miles (9.51 km^{2}), of which 3.62 square miles (9.38 km^{2}) is land and 0.05 square miles (0.13 km^{2}) (1.36%) is water.

The Border-to-Border Trail runs through the city.

=== Major highways ===
- I-94 forms the southernmost boundary of the city
- M-52 (Main Street) runs south–north through the center of the city.

=== Climate ===
This climatic region has large, varying seasonal temperature differences, with warm to hot (and often humid) summers and cold (sometimes severely cold) winters. According to the Köppen Climate Classification system, Chelsea has a humid continental climate, abbreviated "Dfb" on climate maps.

Climate data for Chelsea, MI (1991-2020 normals, extremes 2001-2024)
Month	Jan	Feb	Mar	Apr	May	Jun	Jul	Aug	Sep	Oct	Nov	Dec	Year
Record high °F (°C)	62 (17)	72 (22)	87 (31)	86 (30)	95 (35)	99 (37)	101 (38)	96 (36)	94 (34)	88 (31)	78 (26)	68 (20)	101 (38)
Mean maximum °F (°C)	52 (11)	53 (12)	67 (19)	79 (26)	86 (30)	91 (33)	92 (33)	91 (33)	89 (32)	80 (27)	67 (19)	56 (13)	92 (33)
Mean daily maximum °F (°C)	30.6 (−0.8)	34.0 (1.1)	44.3 (6.8)	57.5 (14.2)	69.5 (20.8)	78.8 (26.0)	82.3 (27.9)	80.4 (26.9)	74.1 (23.4)	61.0 (16.1)	47.2 (8.4)	35.9 (2.2)	58.0 (14.4)
Daily mean °F (°C)	23.5 (−4.7)	25.7 (−3.5)	34.9 (1.6)	47.1 (8.4)	58.6 (14.8)	67.7 (19.8)	71.4 (21.9)	69.6 (20.9)	62.5 (16.9)	50.6 (10.3)	39.0 (3.9)	29.3 (−1.5)	48.3 (9.1)
Mean daily minimum °F (°C)	16.4 (−8.7)	17.4 (−8.1)	25.4 (−3.7)	36.6 (2.6)	47.6 (8.7)	56.5 (13.6)	60.6 (15.9)	58.9 (14.9)	51.0 (10.6)	40.2 (4.6)	30.8 (−0.7)	22.6 (−5.2)	22.6 (−5.2)
Mean minimum °F (°C)	−5 (−21)	−5 (−21)	6 (−14)	22 (−6)	31 (−1)	43 (6)	48 (9)	47 (8)	37 (3)	26 (−3)	15 (−9)	4 (−16)	−5 (−21)
Record low °F (°C)	−17 (−27)	−25 (−32)	−10 (−23)	15 (−9)	25 (−4)	38 (3)	44 (7)	43 (6)	31 (−1)	22 (−6)	0 (−18)	−16 (−27)	−25 (−32)
Average precipitation inches (mm)	2.41 (61)	1.98 (50)	2.24 (57)	3.01 (76)	3.83 (97)	3.64 (92)	3.45 (88)	3.56 (90)	2.74 (70)	3.14 (80)	2.61 (66)	2.08 (53)	34.69 (880)
Average snowfall inches (cm)	10.9 (28)	8.6 (22)	4.7 (12)	0.9 (2.3)	0.0 (0.0)	0.0 (0.0)	0.0 (0.0)	0.0 (0.0)	0.0 (0.0)	0.0 (0.0)	1.8 (4.6)	6.0 (15)	32.9 (83.9)
Average extreme snow depth inches (cm)	7 (18)	7 (18)	4 (10)	1 (2.5)	0 (0)	0 (0)	0 (0)	0 (0)	0 (0)	0 (0)	1 (2.5)	4 (10)	7 (18)
Average precipitation days (≥ 0.01 in)	12.9	9.8	8.7	10.5	11.7	10.1	8.9	9.3	8.7	11.2	9.5	11.4	122.7
Average snowy days (≥ 0.01 in)	7	5.6	2.9	0.6	0	0	0	0	0	0	1.1	4.9	22.1
Source: NOAA (snow depth and extremes)

== Demographics ==
Historical population
Census	Pop.	Note	%±
1870	1,013		—
1880	1,160		14.5%
1890	1,356		16.9%
1900	1,635		20.6%
1910	1,764		7.9%
1920	2,079		17.9%
1930	2,268		9.1%
1940	2,246		−1.0%
1950	2,580		14.9%
1960	3,355		30.0%
1970	3,858		15.0%
1980	3,816		−1.1%
1990	3,772		−1.2%
2000	4,398		16.6%
2010	4,944		12.4%
2020	5,467		10.6%
U.S. Decennial Census

=== 2020 census ===
As of the 2020 census, Chelsea had a population of 5,467. The median age was 47.6 years. 19.5% of residents were under the age of 18 and 28.9% of residents were 65 years of age or older. For every 100 females there were 83.4 males, and for every 100 females age 18 and over there were 78.4 males age 18 and over.

95.7% of residents lived in urban areas, while 4.3% lived in rural areas.

There were 2,344 households in Chelsea, of which 26.5% had children under the age of 18 living in them. Of all households, 47.6% were married-couple households, 14.5% were households with a male householder and no spouse or partner present, and 33.7% were households with a female householder and no spouse or partner present. About 36.8% of all households were made up of individuals and 22.3% had someone living alone who was 65 years of age or older.

There were 2,461 housing units, of which 4.8% were vacant. The homeowner vacancy rate was 1.4% and the rental vacancy rate was 5.7%.

Racial composition as of the 2020 census
Race	Number	Percent
White	5,007	91.6%
Black or African American	40	0.7%
American Indian and Alaska Native	16	0.3%
Asian	94	1.7%
Native Hawaiian and Other Pacific Islander	0	0.0%
Some other race	24	0.4%
Two or more races	286	5.2%
Hispanic or Latino (of any race)	178	3.3%

=== 2010 census ===
As of the census of 2010, there were 4,944 people, 2,224 households, and 1,284 families living in the city. The population density was 1,362.0 inhabitants per square mile (525.9/km^{2}). There were 2,436 housing units at an average density of 671.1 per square mile (259.1/km^{2}). The racial makeup of the city was 96.1% White, 0.4% African American, 0.3% Native American, 1.1% Asian, 0.6% from other races, and 1.5% from two or more races. Hispanic or Latino residents of any race were 2.5% of the population.

There were 2,224 households, of which 28.1% had children under the age of 18 living with them, 46.2% were married couples living together, 8.8% had a female householder with no husband present, 2.8% had a male householder with no wife present, and 42.3% were non-families. 37.2% of all households were made up of individuals, and 21.9% had someone living alone who was 65 years of age or older. The average household size was 2.18 and the average family size was 2.91.

The median age in the city was 43.5 years. 22.7% of residents were under the age of 18; 4.7% were between the ages of 18 and 24; 24% were from 25 to 44; 25.9% were from 45 to 64; and 22.7% were 65 years of age or older. The gender makeup of the city was 45.5% male and 54.5% female.

=== 2000 census ===
As of the census of 2000, there were 4,398 people, 1,840 households, and 1,133 families living in the village. The population density was 1,315.3 inhabitants per square mile (507.8/km^{2}). There were 1,913 housing units at an average density of 572.1 per square mile (220.9/km^{2}). The racial makeup of the village was 97.14% White, 0.70% African American, 0.27% Native American, 0.48% Asian, 0.07% Pacific Islander, 0.39% from other races, and 0.95% from two or more races. Hispanic or Latino residents of any race were 0.82% of the population.

There were 1,840 households, out of which 29.7% had children under the age of 18 living with them, 48.3% were married couples living together, 10.9% had a female householder with no husband present, and 38.4% were non-families. 35.4% of all households were made up of individuals, and 19.7% had someone living alone who was 65 years of age or older. The average household size was 2.27 and the average family size was 2.95.

In the village, 23.6% of the population was under the age of 18, 5.2% was from 18 to 24, 25.0% from 25 to 44, 22.2% from 45 to 64, and 24.0% was 65 years of age or older. The median age was 43 years. For every 100 females, there were 82.9 males. For every 100 females age 18 and over, there were 75.0 males.

The median income for a household in the village was $51,132, and the median income for a family was $72,266. Males had a median income of $50,506 versus $35,579 for females. The per capita income for the village was $27,609. About 2.5% of families and 4.3% of the population were below the poverty line, including 2.9% of those under age 18 and 5.0% of those age 65 or over.

== Economy ==
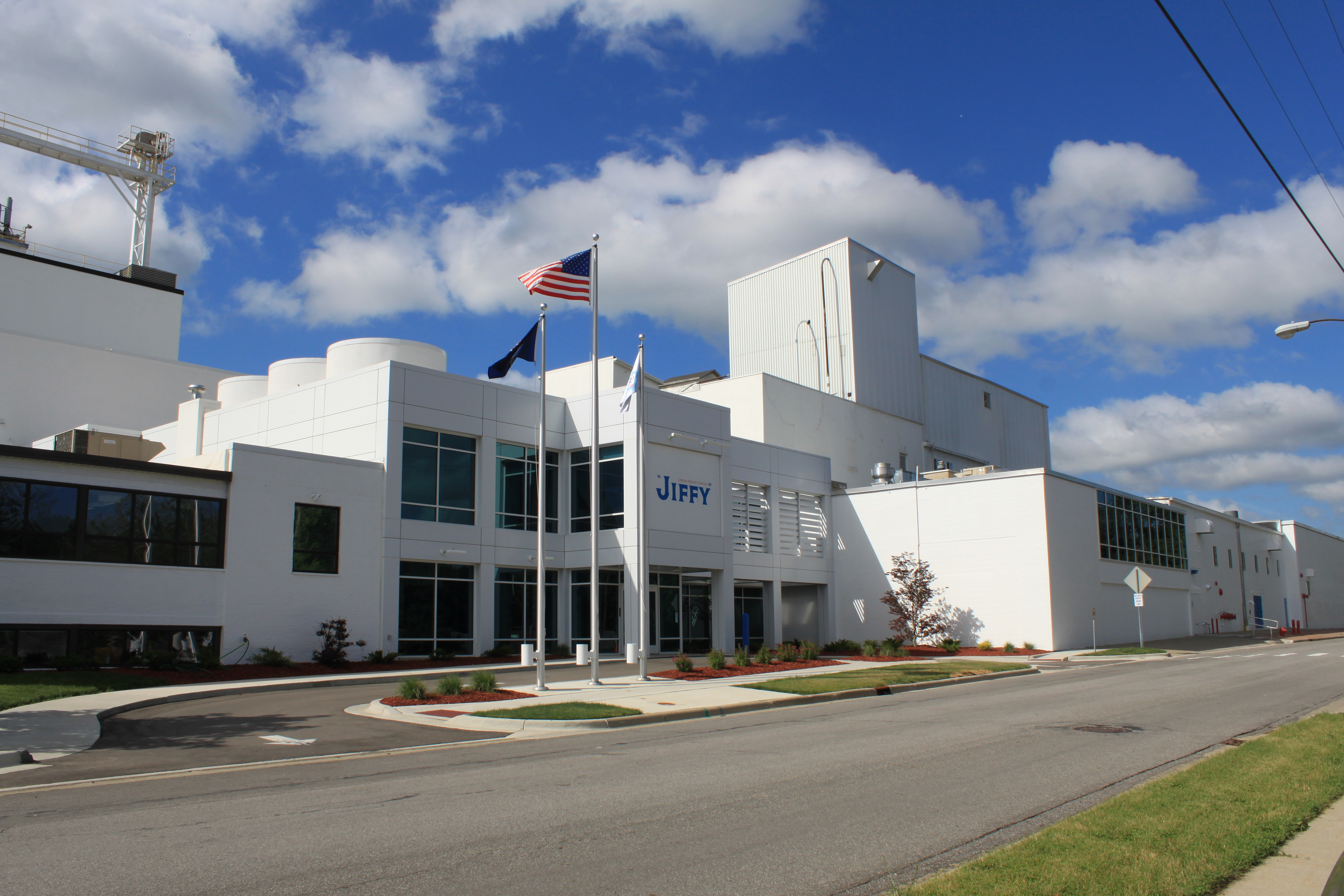
Jiffy headquarters in Chelsea

Chelsea Milling Company, maker of Jiffy Mix, is based in Chelsea. Other employers include Trinity Health Michigan, and the Chrysler Proving Grounds. Chelsea is noted as a "fair trade town."

== Education ==
The city is home to the Chelsea School District, which covers the city and surrounding rural townships. Chelsea High School is located within the city.

The Chelsea District Library serves residents of the city and Dexter, Lima, Lyndon, and Sylvan townships. In 2008, the library was named "Best Small Library in America" by Library Journal.

== Notable people ==
- Lynn Allen, NFL player
- Dwight E. Beach, U.S. Army general and namesake of Beach Middle School
- Jeff Daniels, actor of stage and screen. Founded the Purple Rose Theatre Company in Chelsea.
- Bill Eversole, racing driver
- Laura Kasischke, National Book Critics Circle Award winner, poet, novelist
- Tony Scheffler, professional football player for the Detroit Lions
- Fallon Henley, Pro wrestler for WWE, Former NXT North American and Tag Team champion

== Sister cities ==
- Shimizu, Hokkaido, Japan
