= McPharlin =

McPharlin is a surname. Notable people with the surname include:

- Luke McPharlin (born 1981), Australian rules footballer
- Marjorie Batchelder McPharlin (1903–1997), American puppeteer
- Paul McPharlin (1903–1948), American puppeteer
- Ray McPharlin (1916–1991), Australian politician
- Tegan McPharlin (born 1988), Australian cricketer

== See also ==
- Court–McPharlin Ministry, a Western Australian ministry
