= James Turner (American football) =

American football placekicker (born 2000)

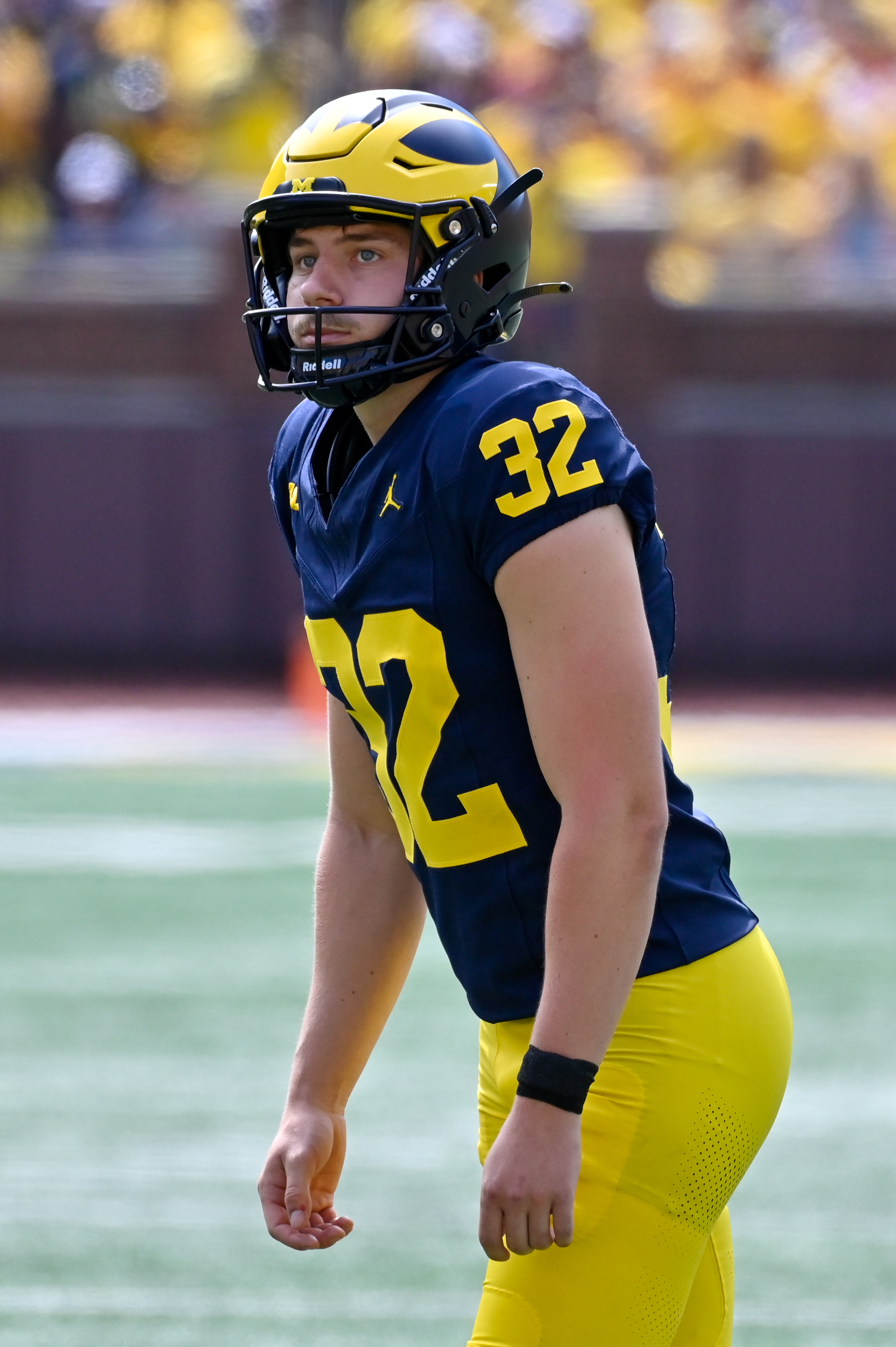
- Turner with the Michigan Wolverines in 2023

Profile
- Position: Kicker

Personal information
- Born: November 22, 2000 (age 25); Saline, Michigan, U.S.
- Listed height: 6 ft 0 in (1.83 m)
- Listed weight: 196 lb (89 kg)

Career information
- High school: Saline
- College: Louisville (2019–2022); Michigan (2023)
- NFL draft: 2024: undrafted

Career history
- Detroit Lions (2024)*; Green Bay Packers (2024)*
- * Offseason or practice squad member only

Awards and highlights
- CFP national champion (2023); Second-team All-Big Ten (2023); Third-team All-ACC (2022)

James Turner (born November 22, 2000) is an American former football placekicker. He played college football for the Michigan Wolverines and the Louisville Cardinals. He was an all-conference selection in both the ACC and Big Ten, winning a national championship with Michigan in 2023.

== Early life ==
Turner grew up in Saline, Michigan and attended Saline High School. As a senior, he went 12 for 12 on field goal attempts and 45 for 46 on extra point attempts. He also handled kickoffs, having 36 touchbacks on the year. Turner was named a first team all-state selection by The Detroit News. He committed to play college football for the Louisville Cardinals as a preferred walk on.

== College career ==
=== Louisville Cardinals ===
Turner played four years at Louisville. In his freshman year he played in the final five games as the Cardinals' kickoff specialist and recorded four touchbacks. Turner also played a role in Louisville's 2019 Music City Bowl, in which he recovered a fumble at the opposing 33 yard line. In Turner's sophomore year, he played in 11 games, going 40 for 40 on extra point attempts and 13 for 15 on field goals, earning All-Atlantic Coast Conference (ACC) honorable mention. He was also named one of the 20 semifinalists for the 2020 Lou Groza Award. In the 2021 season Turner started the year on the Lou Groza award watch list. Turner played in 13 games during the season, going 46 for 47 on his extra point attempts and 14 for 22 on field goals. After the 2021 season he was awarded a scholarship. Turner had his best season in 2022 in which he went 38 for 39 on extra points and 20 for 22 on field goal attempts, earning third-team All-ACC honors. In that same year on November 21, Turner was named the ACC Co-Specialist of the Week after tying a school record making four field goals in a 25–10 win over NC State.

During his time at Louisville, Turner set multiple school records, finishing with the fourth most made field goals, the fifth most points, the fifth best field goal percentage, and the fifth most made extra points in Louisville history.

=== Michigan Wolverines ===
On April 28, 2023, Turner announced via his Twitter that he transferred to the University of Michigan. In his only season with the Wolverines, Turner was voted second-team All-Big Ten on the way to winning a national championship in 2023. He hit 18 out of 21 field goals for the season, including three that were 50 yards. Turner also set a Michigan single-season record with 65 converted point-after attempts (PATs).

== Professional career ==
Pre-draft measurables
Height	Weight	Arm length	Hand span
5 ft 11 7/8 in (1.83 m)	190 lb (86 kg)	30 1/2 in (0.77 m)	8 3/8 in (0.21 m)
All values from Pro Day

=== Detroit Lions ===
On April 28, Turner signed with the Detroit Lions as an undrafted free agent following the 2024 NFL draft. He was waived on June 18.

=== Green Bay Packers ===
On June 24, 2024, Turner was claimed off waivers by the Green Bay Packers. On July 30, he was released.
