= Faurecia (Saline Plant) =

Automotive parts manufacturing plant in Saline, Michigan

Coordinates: 42°10′36.0″N 83°45′55.0″W

Automotive Components Holdings, LLC (ACH) located in Saline, Michigan was an automotive parts manufacturing plant that specialized in the manufacture of plastics, trim pieces, instrument panels, door panels, consoles, and other various internal plastic parts. On June 1, 2012, Faurecia, a French automotive parts supplier, began operations at the plant.

The facility is located on Michigan Avenue just outside Saline. Outgoing freight service to various railroads in Toledo, Ohio is provided by the Ann Arbor Railroad. As a "primary customer," the plant receives 13.2 kv electrical service from DTE Energy via a dedicated substation on the west side of the property.

== History ==
The plant first opened its doors in 1966 when Ford Motor Company relocated it from nearby Brooklyn, Michigan to Saline. The plant specialized early on in plastics and trim manufacture. In 2000 the plant began a series of ownership changes. The first of which was Visteon Corporation in 2000. Visteon was spun off from Ford Motor Company and became an independent, publicly traded company. In 2005 Visteon struck a deal with its former parent company to transfer ownership of Saline, and several of their facilities, back to Ford Motor Company in an effort to avoid bankruptcy. The new company was called Automotive Components Holdings, LLC. ACH was owned by Ford Motor Company and its primary mission was to sell or close the plant by December 2008. The workers of the plant are represented by the Saline Local 892 chapter of the UAW.

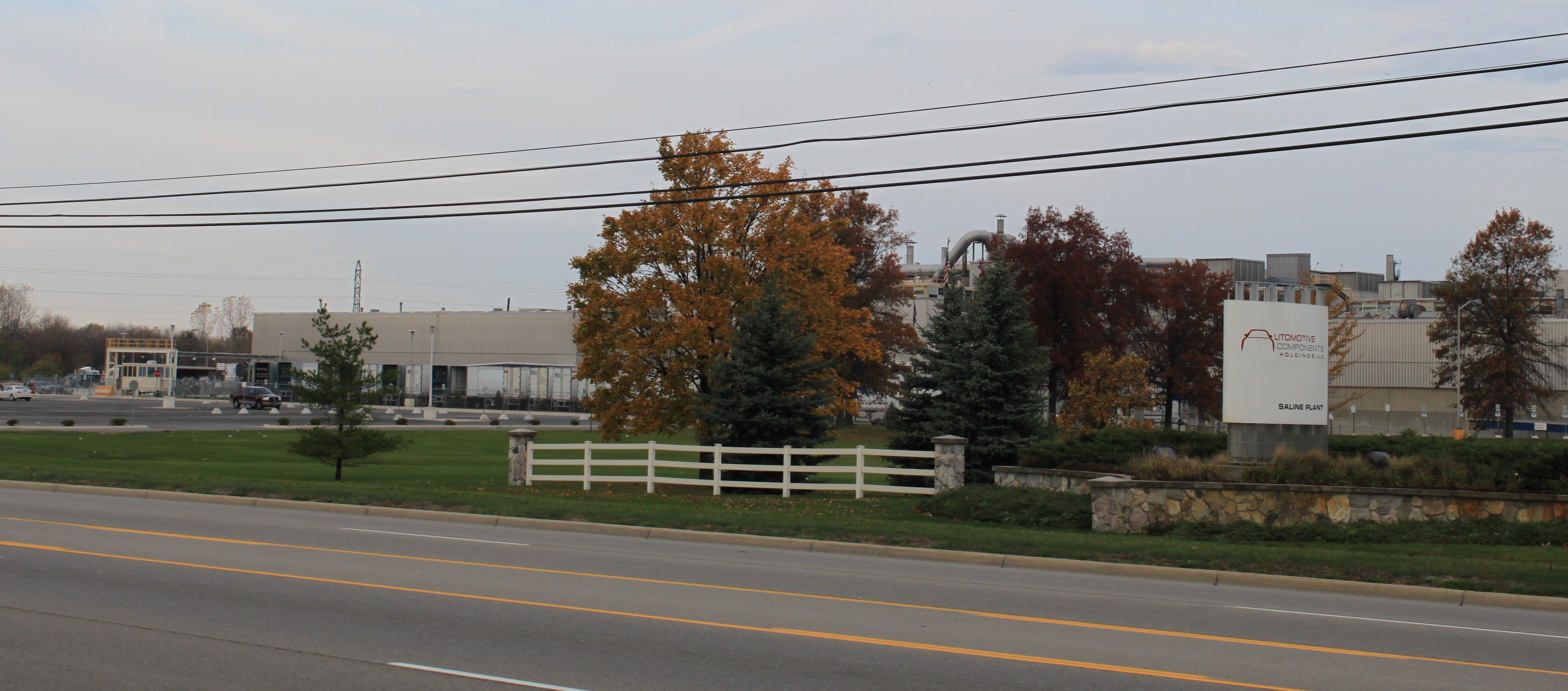
ACH Saline Plant

On November 15, 2007, ACH announced that it had reached a tentative agreement to sell the plant to Johnson Controls pending the ability of Johnson Controls to reach a competitive labor agreement with the plant's employees. As of September 2008, Johnson Controls no longer had any plans to purchase the plant. Johnson Controls backed out of the deal and did not buy the Saline Plant; instead Ford removed all ACH employees that were transferred from Ypsilanti and other plants and moved them to Indefinite Lay Off (ILO), while highest seniority ACH employees were transferred to the Milan plant as of September 2009. Ford employees were then taken from the GIN pool, effectively getting rid of the GIN pool and placing all remaining Ford employees into the Saline Plant.

Ford Motor Company began negotiations for possible sale of the Saline plant but continued to operate and support Saline.

On May 3, 2012, Faurecia announced its intention to buy the plant, and gained control two months later. Plans were announced for an official dedication of the plant on July 17, 2012. It also announced plans to "reconfigure and upgrade" the plant over "the next few years."

== See also ==
- Faurecia (Parent company)
- Automotive Components Holdings
- Ford Motor Company
- Visteon Corporation
