= Meredith Bixby =

American puppeteer (1937-2022)

- Born: May 31, 1909; Detroit, MI, U.S.
- Died: September 11, 2002 (aged 93); Saline, MI., U.S.
- Education: Wayne State University, Art Students League
- Occupation: Puppeteer
- Spouse: Thyra Bixby

Meredith Bixby (May 31, 1909 – Sept. 11, 2002) was an American puppeteer.

== Early life and education ==
Meredith Bixby studied engineering at Wayne State University, but discovered a passion for drawing. He moved to New York City and attended the Art Students League, studying painting under Thomas Hart Benton. Jackson Pollock was one of his classmates. To support himself, he worked at the New York Public Library Main Branch. There he found the book A Repertory of Marionette Plays by Paul McPharlin and attempted to make his own production of Dr. Faustus during a month’s vacation. After producing a couple of shows, he thought marionette productions would promise a better means of support than painting.

His early productions toured from Boston to New Orleans. He also produced plays for commercial clients. His career paused during World War II, where he served as superintendent of a tool and die shop in Miami.

== Career ==
After World War II, Bixby moved to Saline, Michigan, where his father had a dentistry practice. From there, the Meredith Marionettes Touring Company toured predominantly to schools in Michigan, Ohio, Indiana, and Kentucky. His repertoire included Pinocchio, The Caliph Stork, The Magic Stalk (Jack and the Beanstalk), The Enchanted Birds, The Little Humpbacked Horse, The Wizard of Oz, and The Golden Fish. Bixby created the scenes and backdrops, wrote the scripts (some based on Russian folk tales) and carved the 3-foot tall marionettes. His wife Thyra made the costumes, and served as promotions and publicity director. Each year, he would preview his productions in the old Saline Opera House on S. Ann Arbor Street, which was also his studio.

Bixby trained recent college graduates to take the show on the road and pull the strings. The troupe performed two to three shows a day, and was on the road 180 days a year, performing for 250,000 children annually. To keep the vocal performances consistent, Bixby taped the dialog, with additional voices performed by his wife, his daughter Norah, local radio personality Ted Heusel, and other Ann Arbor-based actors as needed.

While a season’s production toured, Bixby created the next season’s show: writing the script, carving puppets, and designing posters and scenery. Some of his marionettes had unique features, like a house on chicken’s feet that lit up from the inside, and other marionettes that would smoke pipes and blow smoke.

== Other activities ==
In 1937, Bixby was among the founders of Puppeteers of America.

In 1956, Bixby was a founding officer of the Saline Broadcasting Co., and acquired the radio broadcast license for WOIA studios.

In 1969, Bixby began making films of his marionette plays, eventually renting space from the Saline Station in 1982 to continue filming and editing.

== Legacy ==
In 1997, Bixby donated his entire collection of marionettes and props to the city of Saline, and his works were displayed at the Chamber of Commerce until 2008.

In 1998, Bixby was recognized for his life’s work in the U.S. House of Representatives.

In 2024, James K. and Marcia J. Cameron published Tales Come Alive! The Meredith Marionettes: An Oral History.
