= Nota bene =

Latin phrase meaning "note well"

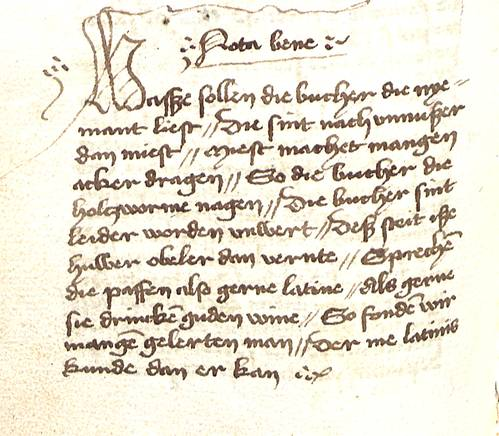
Nota bene editorial remarks: The monographic "Verses on the Futility of Unread Books" is a NB presented to the reader for deeper discussion of the subject. (Handwriting Hs. I 300, City Library of Mainz.)

Nota bene (/ˌnoʊtə ˈbɛneɪ, ˈbɛni, ˈbiːni/ NOH-tə BEN-ay, BEN-ee, BEE-nee; plural: notate bene) is a Latin phrase meaning note well. In manuscripts, nota bene is abbreviated in upper-case as NB and N.B., and in lower-case as n.b. and nb; the editorial usages of nota bene and notate bene first appeared in English around the year 1711. In Modern English, since the 14th century, the editorial usage of NB is common in legal writing to direct the reader's attention to a thematically relevant aspect of the subject that qualifies the matter being litigated.

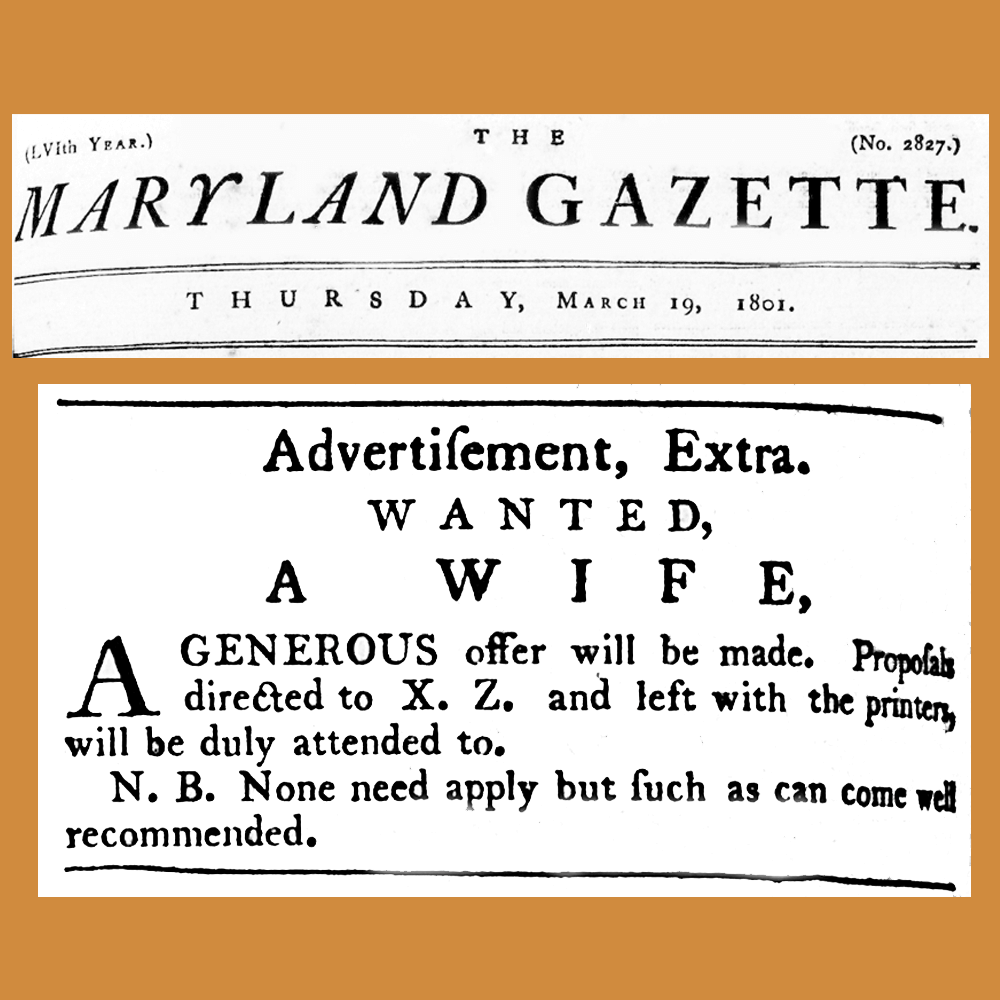
Nota bene editorial usage: In 1801, the author of the "Wife-Wanted" newspaper advert used the uppercase N.B. editorial abbreviation to stipulate that only moral women need apply to marry him.

In medieval manuscripts, the editorial marks used to draw the reader's attention to a supporting text also are called nota bene marks; however, the catalogue of medieval editorial marks does not include the NB abbreviation. The medieval equivalents to the n.b.-mark are anagrams derived from the four letters of the Latin word nota, thus the abbreviation DM for dignum memoria ("worth remembering") and the typographic index symbol of the manicule (☞), the little hand that indicates the start of the relevant supporting text.

== See also ==
- Annotation – Item of metadata attached to a document
- Cf. – Latin abbreviation meaning "compare"
- i.e. – Latin abbreviation meaning "that is"
- List of Latin abbreviations
- List of Latin phrases
- List of legal Latin terms
- q.v. – Latin phrase meaning "which see"
- viz. – Latin abbreviation meaning "namely"
