= Automotive Components Holdings =

Temporary business formed in 2005, managed by Ford Motor Company

Automotive Components Holdings, LLC
- Type: Subsidiary
- Industry: Automotive
- Founded: October 1, 2005; 20 years ago
- Headquarters: Dearborn, Michigan, United States
- Products: Automobile components
- Parent: Ford Motor Company

Automotive Components Holdings, LLC (informally ACH) is a Ford Motor Company-managed temporary business formed by the 2005 transfer of 17 automotive components factories and six research, testing and other facilities from Visteon Corporation to Ford. The creation of ACH was intended to ensure that Ford continued to receive a flow of parts from the facilities, whilst enabling them to be prepared for sale or other disposition.

ACH is headquartered in Dearborn, Michigan, United States.

== History ==
ACH was established by Ford Motor Company as a temporary business structure to hold and manage 17 automotive components factories and six research, testing and other facilities acquired from Visteon on October 1, 2005. The plants were acquired by Ford primarily to ensure that its operations were not affected by parts-supply disruptions or Visteon's ability to invest in future programs whilst Visteon was experiencing a period of severe financial challenge.

Two plants – Converca (power transfer units) and El Jarudo (fuel rails) - were sold in 2007. The driveshaft business based at the Monroe Plant was sold to Neapco Drivelines, LLC in January 2008, and its equipment and employees were moved to another location in southeast Michigan. On April 14, 2008 the ACH glass business, including three plants (Nashville, Tulsa and Vidriocar) and the Carlite glass distribution facility, were sold to Zeledyne Glass Products, a company specifically formed to acquire all of the former glass operations of ACH and run them as an independent company. Three facilities - Utica (idled), Monroe (idled), Ypsilanti (idled) - were sold in 2009 and 2010.

== Operations ==
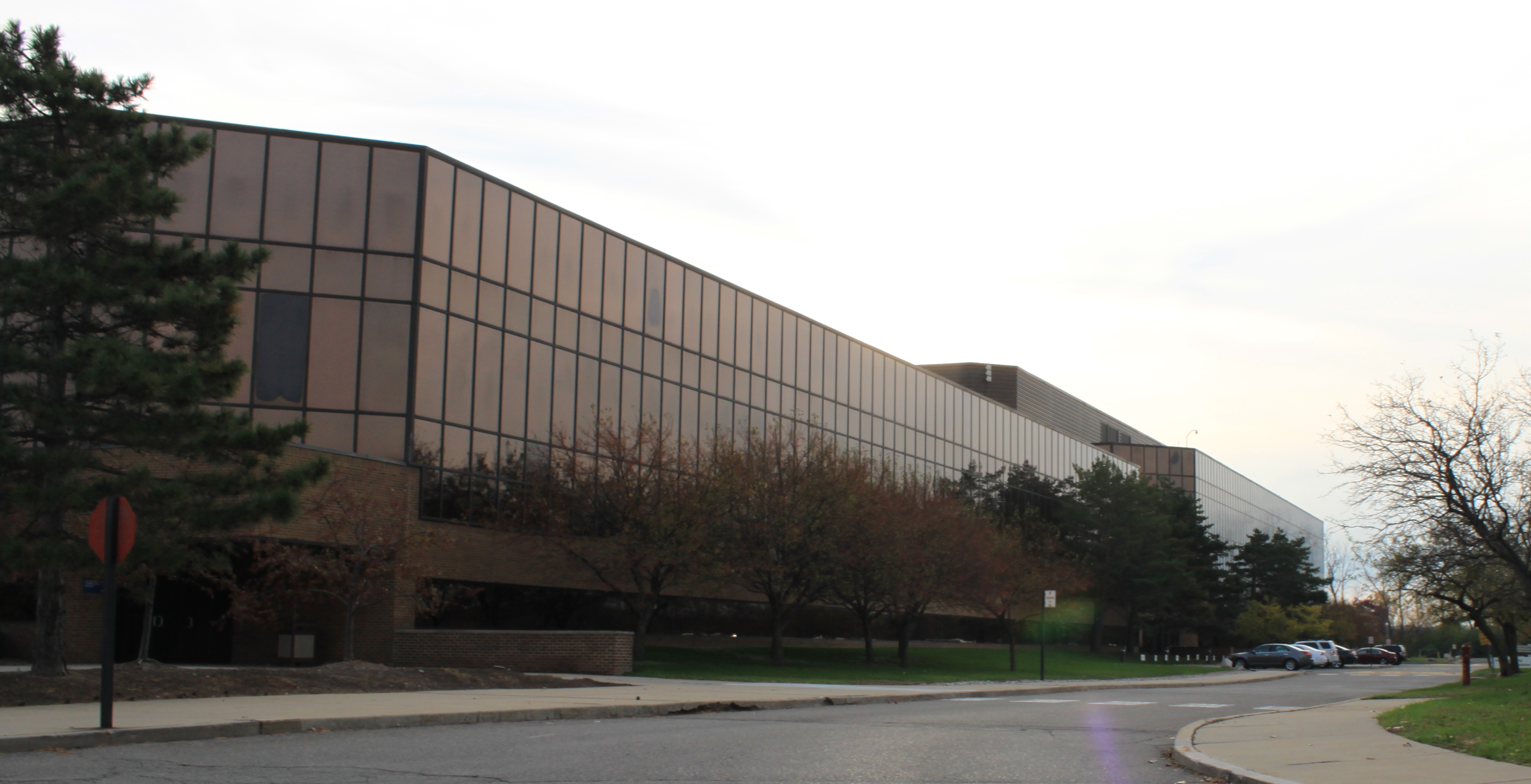
ACH World Headquarters, Dearborn

=== Former ===
Former ACH facilities include:

- Sheldon Road Plant - Plymouth, Michigan: produced climate control components. Operations ceased in December 2014. Business sold to Detroit Thermal Systems, LLC based out of Romulus, MI.
- Sandusky Plant - Sandusky, Ohio: produces lighting, air induction and fuel vapor storage components. Sale to Flex-N-Gate announced May 30, 2012; sale to complete June 30, 2012.
- Saline Plant - Saline, Michigan: produces interior components including instrument panels, consoles and door trim. Sold to Faurecia, which began operations there June 1, 2012.
- Carlite Glass Distribution Center - Nashville, Tennessee: distributes glass components; sale to Zeledyne Glass Products completed in April 2008.
- Chesterfield Plant - Chesterfield Township. Michigan: produced seating foam; closed in June 2006.
- El Jarudo Plant - Mexico: produces powertrains; sold to Cooper-Standard Automotive on April 2, 2007.
- Indianapolis Plant - Indianapolis, Indiana: produced steering components; closed in April 2012.
- Kansas City Plant - Kansas City, Missouri: conducted IP, lamp final assembly and sequencing; closed in December 2006.
- Milan Plant - Milan, Michigan: produces gas tanks; leased to Inergy in August 2011.
- Monroe Plant - Monroe, Michigan: produces chassis; idled in 2008, then sold to Ford Motor Company in 2009.
- Nashville Glass Plant - Nashville, Tennessee: produces glass components; sale to Zeledyne Glass Products completed in April 2008.
- Rawsonville Plant - Ypsilanti, Michigan: produces powertrains; transferred back to Ford and now operated as a Ford facility.
- Sterling Plant - Sterling Heights, Michigan: produces axles; transferred back to Ford and now operated as a Ford facility.
- Tulsa Glass Plant - Tulsa, Oklahoma: produces glass components; sale to Zeledyne Glass Products completed in April 2008.
- Utica Plant - Shelby Twp. Michigan: produces interior and exterior components; closed in 2009, subsequently sold to a private investor in 2010.
- Vidriocar Plant - Juarez, Mexico: produces glass components; sale to Zeledyne Glass Products completed in April 2008.
- Ypsilanti Plant - Ypsilanti Michigan: produced chassis; closed in 2009, with the property sold in 2010.
