= Rentschler Farm Museum =

- Emanuel and Elizabeth Rentschler Farmstead
- U.S. National Register of Historic Places
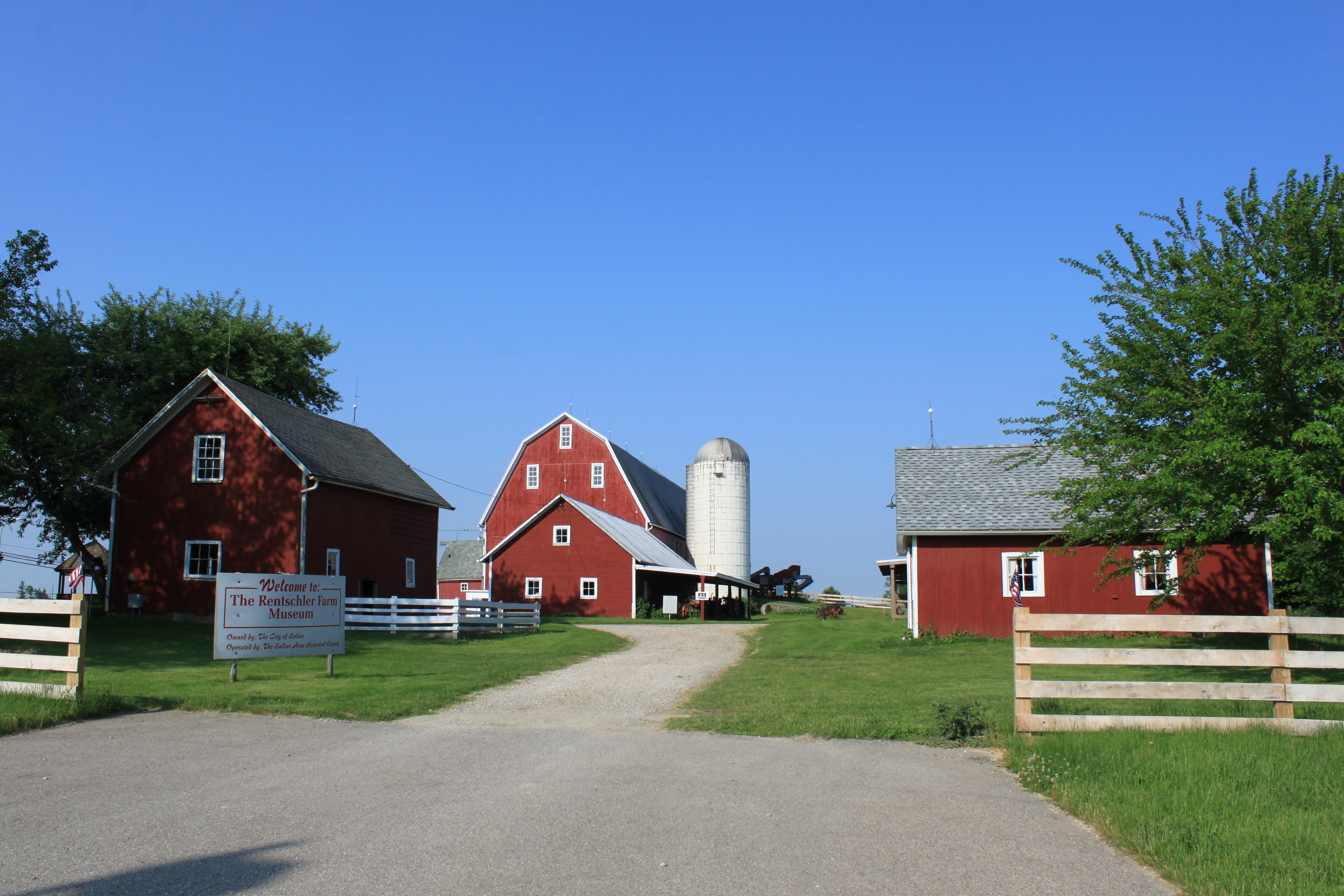
- Rentschler Farm Museum

- Location within Michigan Location within the United States
- Interactive map
- Location: 1265 E. Michigan Ave., Saline, Michigan
- Coordinates: 42°10′35″N 83°45′39″W
- Area: 4 acres (1.6 ha)
- Architectural style: Queen Anne
- NRHP reference No.: 13000445
- Added to NRHP: June 25, 2013

Rentschler Farm Museum is a historic site located at 1265 East Michigan Avenue near downtown Saline, Michigan. The site consists of an old-fashioned farmhouse and eleven outbuildings, including a hog house, an equipment shed, a hen house, and a windmill, among others. The site is now a museum that serves as a tourist attraction, showing how farming has changed over the years. The site was listed on the National Register of Historic Places in 2013.

The Rentschler farm museum holds special events during certain times of the year. In the fall, the Rentschler farm has an annual harvest celebration that consists of guided tours of the farm and garden, blacksmithing demonstrations, and antique car shows.

Near Christmas, the Saline Historical Society holds an event called "Christmas on the Farm", where people are invited to celebrate the season in an environment similar to that of the 1930s.

== History ==
In 1825, John Gilbert purchased a 240-acre farmstead encompassing the land where the Rentschler Farm Museum now stands. By 1840, the property had passed into the hands of the Tate family, who farmed the land, and at some point constructed a house, barn, and tool shed on the property.

In 1901, the farmstead was put up for auction and purchased by Emanuel Rentschler. A few years later, Emanuel Rentschler moved and expanded the barn. In 1906, he dismantled the original house and, with the help of his brother Matthew Rentschler, constructed a new house on the property. More outbuildings were added in subsequent years, including a milkhouse and henhouse.

The land continued to be used by four generations of Rentschlers. By 1998, the family had sold off most of the farm in individual parcels. The last landowner, Warren Rentschler, sold the last parcel of land including the farmstead to the city of Saline at a discount. The city turned the farmstead it into a museum. The farmhouse and adjacent buildings, which had been in use since 1900, were restored in 2001 by the Saline Area Historical Society, and the old farm became the Rentschler Farm Museum.

== Buildings ==
There are fourteen historically significant structures on the Rentschler Farm. These include:

1. Main House (1906) The main house has an architectural style which draws from multiple sources, but is dominated by the Queen Anne aesthetic. The house has fish scale shingles in the gable ends and a wrap-around gingerbread porch.
2. Big Barn
3. Silo
4. Milk House
5. Lamb Barn
6. Water Tank House
7. Corncrib
8. Small Implement Barn
9. Tractor Shed (1924)
10. Hen House (ca. 1912)
11. Big Equipment Barn (ca. 1950)
12. Open Tool Shed (ca. 1890)
13. Hog House (ca 1912)
14. Tool Shed (ca. 1910)
