= Manicule =

Symbol depicting a pointing finger

☞o

Manicule
- In Unicode: U+261A ☚ BLACK LEFT POINTING INDEX; U+261B ☛ BLACK RIGHT POINTING INDEX; U+261C ☜ WHITE LEFT POINTING INDEX; U+261D ☝︎ WHITE UP POINTING INDEX; U+261E ☞ WHITE RIGHT POINTING INDEX; U+261F ☟ WHITE DOWN POINTING INDEX
- Although the symbol names begin with Black or White, Unicode uses the word 'black' to mean solid and 'white' to mean outlined. (Note: The actual colour is a user choice, for example ☚ and ☞.)

Different from
- Different from: U+130A7 𓂧 EGYPTIAN HIEROGLYPH D046; U+00B6 ¶ PILCROW SIGN

Related
- See also: ← ARROW

The manicule, ☞, is a typographical mark with the appearance of a hand with its index finger extended in a pointing gesture. It is typically used to draw the reader's attention to a certain part of a text. In older texts, it had a broader variety of uses including indicating section headers, marginal notes, and terms for cross-reference. The term manicule was derived from the Latin manicula, or 'little hand', though it has been known by many other names, often related to its various functions, including fist, index, and pointer.

Originally used for handwritten marginal notes, it saw widespread usage during the Renaissance by readers who annotated their own books. After the invention of movable type, manicules were cast in metal type blocks and were commonly used in 19th-century advertisements. The symbol's popularity declined by the end of the century, perhaps due to oversaturation. The manicule is infrequently used today, except as an occasional archaic novelty or on informal directional signs. Similar symbols persist as emoji and in the standard hand cursor icon used for clickable hyperlinks or other interactive elements.

== Terminology ==
Throughout its history, the mark has been referred to by a variety of names. When William H. Sherman wrote the first dedicated study of the symbol in his 2005 paper, "Towards a History of the Manicule", he used the term manicule. It is derived from the Latin root manicula, meaning "little hand". Cognates of the term were common in Romance languages, but the English loanword manicule was largely restricted to manuscript scholarship prior to Sherman's paper. Sherman explains his decision not to use one of the various English terms because manicule describes the mark itself while many of the other terms describe one of its various functions. For example, Sherman writes that "fist has its origins in printers' slang and should properly be restricted to the products of the printing press".

Sherman lists 14 further names used for the symbol. (Note: Sherman mentions finding "15 other names", but lists only 14.) Sherman writes that three are likely conflations with other terms. The first of these, the pilcrow is the paragraph mark, ¶. The second, maniple is either a misapplication of maniple, the cloth used by priests during Mass, or it is a combination of manicule with manciple. The third, indicule is likely a combination of indicator with manicule. Sherman then lists the Latin indicationum and ten English terms for the manicule:

- hand
- pointing hand
- hand director
- pointer
- digit
- fist
- mutton fist
- bishop's fist
- index
- indicator

== History ==
=== Handwritten manicules ===
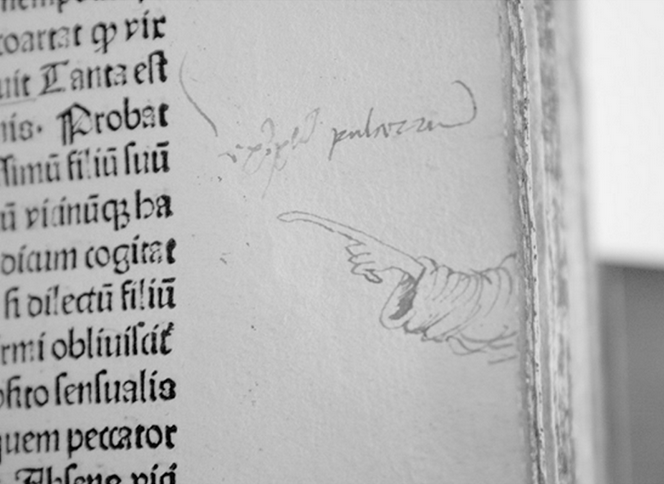
15th-century manuscript manicule

The symbol began as a form of marginalia that developed alongside books in their now-standard codex form. The codex format for texts, introduced in the 4th century AD, was better suited to marginal notation than the continuous scrolls used in antiquity. While the text on a scroll is written on the same long length of papyrus or parchment, a codex has physically separate pages bound at one edge. Their format is very similar to the modern book, although they were typically handmade from expensive vellum or parchment made from animal hides instead of paper. Stallybrass argues that the codex encouraged discontinuous reading of a text because readers could easily flip between distant pages.

The scroll as a technology depends upon a literal unwinding, in which the physical proximity of one moment in the narrative to another is both materially and symbolically significant. One cannot move easily back and forth between distant points on a scroll. But it is precisely such movement back and forth that the book permits. It not only allows for discontinuous reading; it encourages it.

— Peter Stallybrass, "Books and Scrolls: Navigating the Bible" (2002)

In Europe, note-taking by readers and the related usage of the manicule peaked in the Renaissance. It is difficult to say when the manicule first appeared because its usage was heavily tied to the act of reading. Renaissance owners of expensive manuscripts and of early printed books often extensively annotated their books. Many manuscripts and printed books from the period contain personal systems of marginal symbols and notes written by the book's reader, and some even have handwritten legends for the symbols and entire indexes appended to the book.

The term index had a broader range of meaning in medieval and early Renaissance books. The modern index, an alphabetic listing of topics printed at the back of a book, was not included in medieval manuscript books or the early printed books. Instead, readers would rely on a broad range of indices that they added to their own books, including marginalia, tables, lists, and bookmarks. The term index comes from the index finger which could be used by readers to physically mark one's place when cross-referencing different pages in a book. A common type of marginal index was the nota bene, which translates literally as "note well", where a written note would be placed in the margin and often directed to a part of the main text with a manicule.

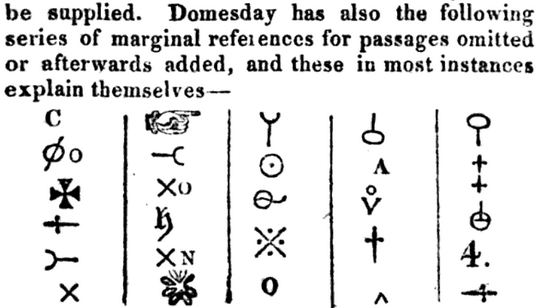
Johnson (1824)

Domesday (1086)

According to John Johnson's Typographia, Or The Printers' Instructor (1824), the manicule was one of many self-explanatory marginal symbols appearing in Domesday Book, completed in 1086.

Though the manicule was used for centuries to annotate books by both copyists and readers, there was little written about the mark itself. The oldest book known to contain a manicule is the 1086 land survey, Domesday Book, but the age of the annotation is unknown and may date to much later. Domesday Book uses a range of symbols for marginal annotations including the manicule and daggers. Printer John Johnson's 1824 typography guide, Typographia, Or The Printers' Instructor, dismissively says that Domesday Book's various reference marks, including the dagger, manicule, and asterisk, "in most instances explain themselves".

Manicules appeared in 12th-century handwritten manuscripts in Spain, and became common in 14th- and 15th-century Italian manuscripts. Some were as simple as "two squiggly strokes suggesting the barest sketch of a pointing hand" and thus quick to draw, while others were playful and elaborate, with shading and artful cuffs. Some have fingers lengthened and bent to point deep into the text. For example, a 14th-century manuscript of Cicero's Paradoxa Stoicorum includes manicules that variously stretch out fingernails, stretch all of their fingers to cover the full length of a passage, are an octopus, or wield a snake.

Variety of manicules from a 14th-century manuscript

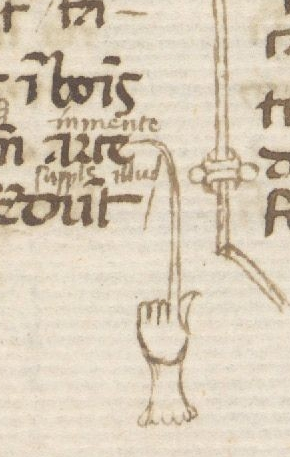
Nail
(p. 1)

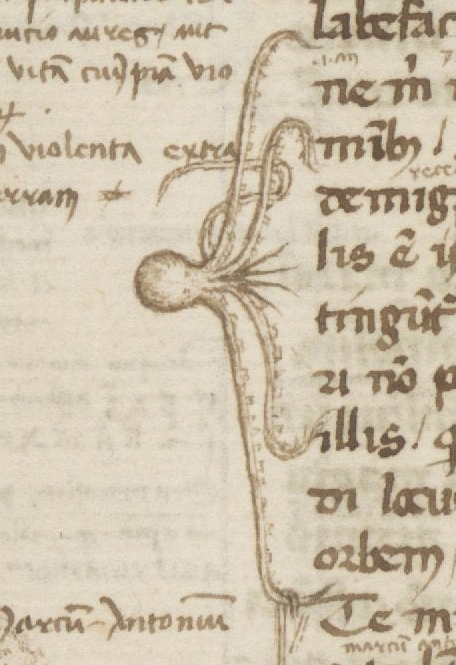
Octopus
(p. 2)

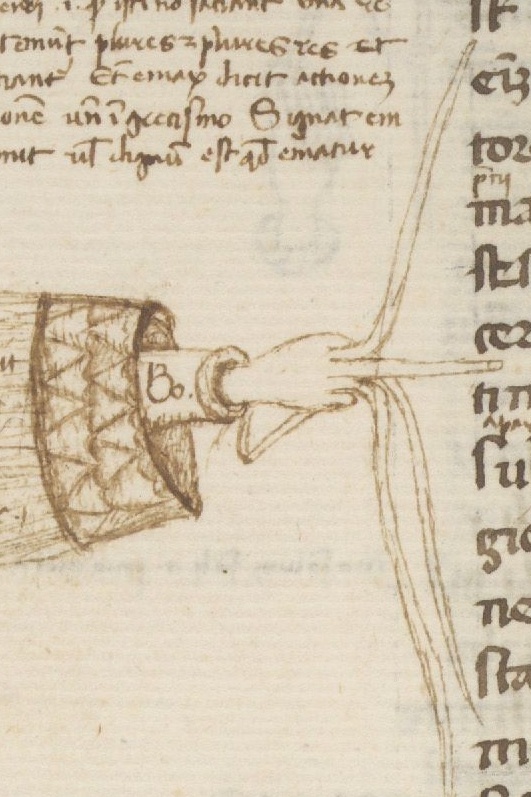
Fingers
(p. 3)

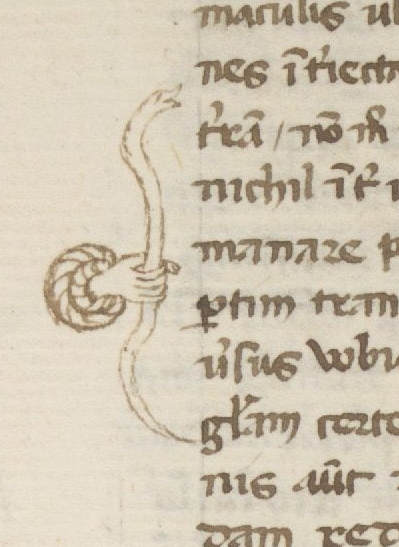
Snake
(p. 4)

After the popularisation of the printing press starting in the 1450s, the handwritten manicule continued as a means to annotate printed documents. Some early print books contain both printed manicules from the publisher and handwritten manicules from readers highlighting different parts of the text. They eventually fell out of popularity in the 19th century.

=== In print ===
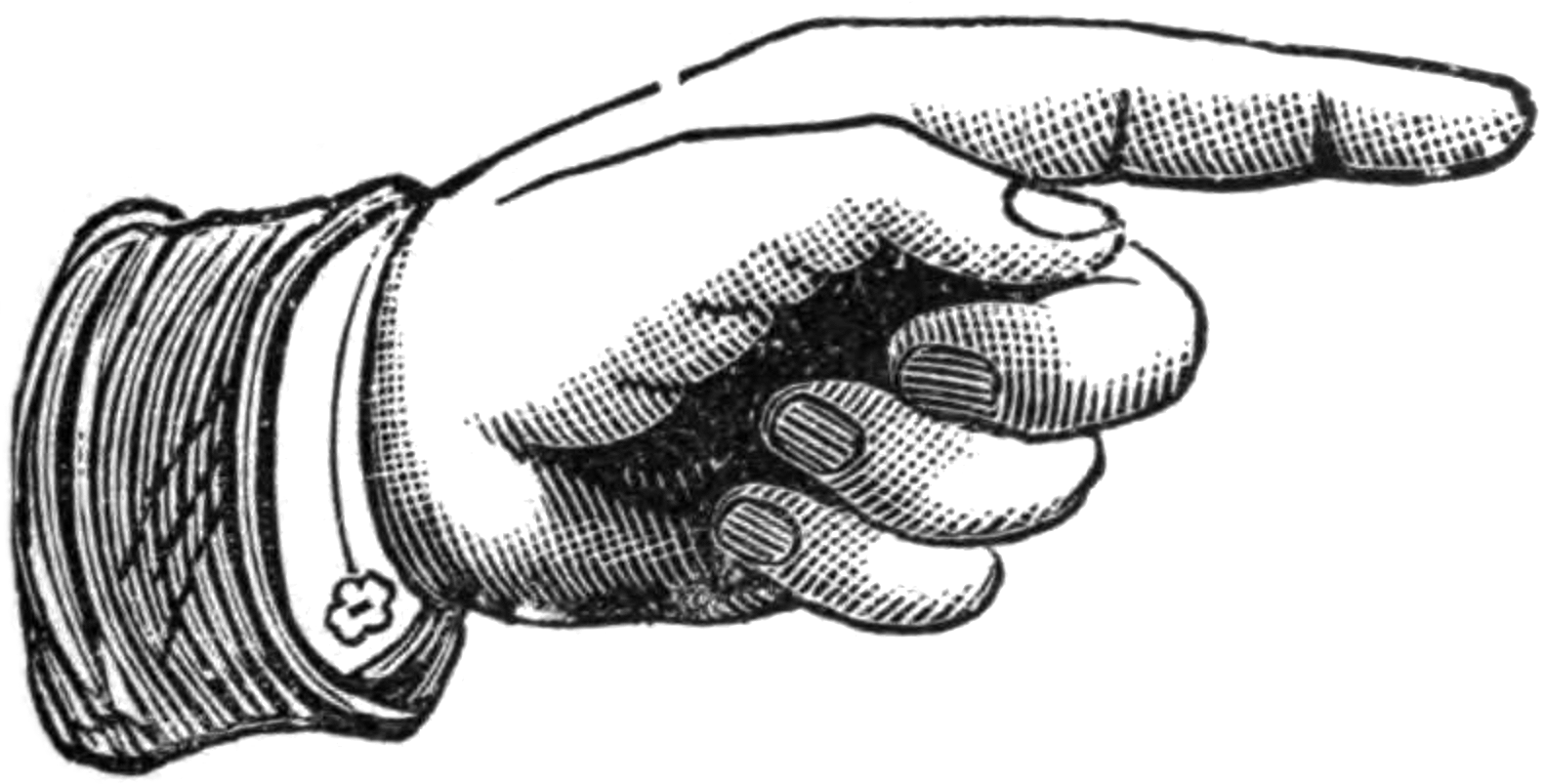
A manicule from the "Specimen Book of the Cincinnati Type Foundry" (1882)

With the invention of movable type, the manicule was printed from its own metal type block in the same manner as individual letters, numbers, and punctuation marks. Early printers used the manicule as a type of paragraph mark. Before paragraph and section breaks were signalled by spacing and font changes, printers used typographic symbols including the manicule and pilcrow. Sometimes these marks distinguished different types of textual divisions, such as in a c. 1548 printing of John Heywood's A Play of Love where the pilcrow and manicule were used to indicate dialogue and action, respectively. Mathias Huss and Johannes Schabeler used the manicule as a paragraph marker in their 1484 edition of Paulus Florentinus's Breviarum totius juris canonici. Writer John Boardley identifies the first appearance of a manicule in a printed book as an earlier 1479 edition of the same work printed in Milan by Leonhard Pachel and Ulrich Scinzenzeller, and using the same Gothic rotunda font. In both versions of this book, the pilcrow and manicule were used to set off sections on laws and commentaries on laws, respectively. Into the 19th century, an American magazine, The Saturday Evening Post, separated shorter breaking news stories with manicules.

Much early print usage of the manicule continued the manuscript tradition of connecting the main text to marginal notes, but in a variety of nonstandard ways, such as pointing outward to the margin or combined with reference letters. From the 16th century onward, the manicule appeared frequently as a decorative element similar to the fleuron (❦). It was used on title pages of books, alongside other so-called "dingbats".

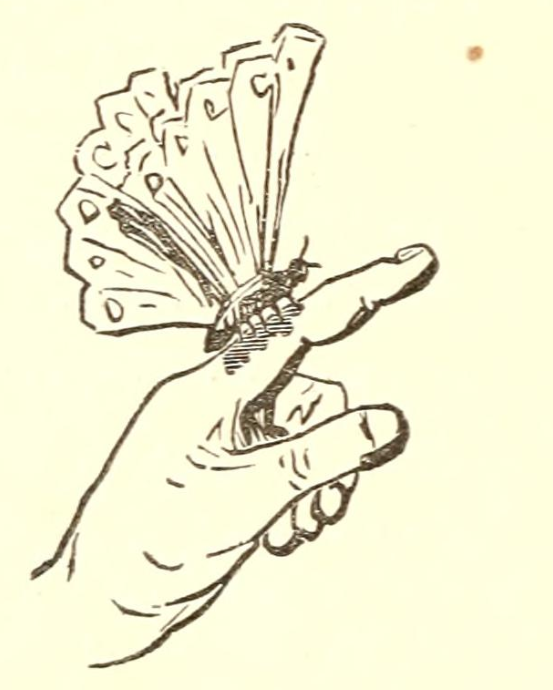
Butterfly Manicule from Walt Whitman's poetry collection Leaves of Grass

The manicule attained a great degree of popularity in the late 18th and early 19th centuries, particularly in advertisements. It also became more visually diverse, with larger and more complex fists created. According to literature scholar Eric Conrad, American poet Walt Whitman was evoking both the manicule's tradition of annotation and its contemporary association with advertising, when he used a pointing hand with a butterfly perched on the index finger to represent his 1860 collection Leaves of Grass.

The symbol was also widely used in signage, particularly in fingerposts. Some gravestones from the 1830s and 1840s included manicules pointing upwards. Paul McPharlin wrote of finding a small-town grave marker using a contemporary fat face font, "at the bottom of which a large 'fist' points electrically heavenward". The United States Postal Service has used a pointing hand as a graphical indicator meaning "Return to Sender".

Its popularity declined toward the end of the 19th century, perhaps due to oversaturation in advertising. By the 1890s, it was used more often for ironic effect. Sherman (2005) argues that as the symbols became standardised, they were no longer reflective of individuality in comparison to other writing, and this explains their diminished popularity. As they were replaced by simpler arrows, the pointing hand became associated with the past and is sometimes used as part of an old-fashioned or "vintage" aesthetic. The manicule became obscure enough that it was omitted from many typefaces, being left to specialist faces containing dingbat characters. More recently, OpenType computer fonts have begun to include custom manicules in their repertoire.

== Usage ==
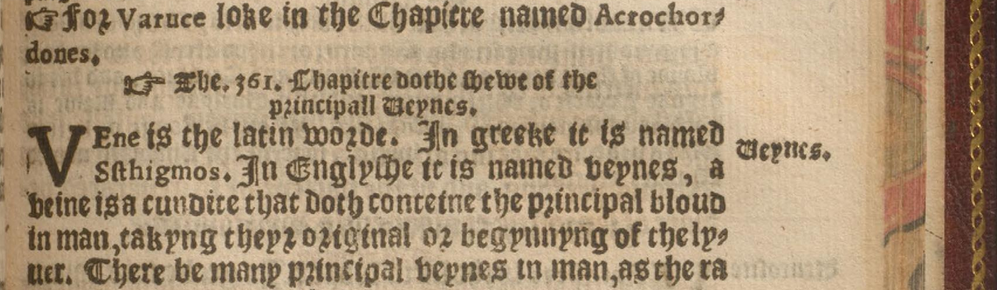
Manicule as section header and cross-reference indicator in Andrew Boorde's Breviary of Health (1547)

The typical use of the pointing hand is as a bullet-like symbol to direct the reader's attention to important text, having roughly the same meaning as the word "attention" or "note". It is used this way both by annotators and printers. From its first few centuries of use, the manicule was used to draw attention to specific text, such as a title (in some cases in the form of a row of manicules), inserted text, noteworthy passage, or sententiae. In some cases, fleurons (flower marks) and asterisks were used for similar purposes.

Less commonly, in earlier centuries the pointing hand acted as a section divider with a pilcrow as paragraph divider, or more rarely as the paragraph divider itself. These uses were sometimes mixed within a single text. In Andrew Boorde's 1547 Brevyary of Health, manicules were used to highlight passages, indicate section headers, and to indicate terms that can be cross-referenced (looked up under another entry).

Print reference works, such as encyclopedias, have used various typographical elements including bold text, italics, small caps, arrows, and manicules to mark terms for cross-reference. For example, they might format a term with small caps and a manicule, as ☞ example, to indicate that a reader could flip through the alphabetised listings to an entry titled "example". (Note: Examples of the manicule used for cross-references: Farkas, Daniel H. (2004). DNA from A to Z. Amer. Assoc. for Clinical Chemistry. ISBN 978-1-59425-002-6.; Simmonds, Jeremy (2012). The Encyclopedia of Dead Rock Stars: Heroin, Handguns, and Ham Sandwiches. Chicago Review Press. ISBN 978-1-61374-532-8.; Pregadio, Fabrizio (2025). Dictionary of taoist internal alchemy. Handbook of oriental studies. Leiden: Brill. ISBN 978-90-04-71223-2.) Some reference works have used cross-reference manicules as an abbreviation for "see". In printed texts, the cross-references and marginal notes have served a linking function similar to the clickable hyperlinks used in digital encyclopedias, which have replaced purely typographic cross-references.

The manicule has had several niche technical usages. In linguistics, it is used in optimality theory tableaux to identify the optimal output in a candidate of generated possibilities from a given input. The computer programming language Smalltalk-72 uses a right-pointing manicule as a quotation mark. The Lincoln Writer terminals designed around 1958 for the MIT Lincoln Laboratory's TX-2 computer used a character set which included a right-pointing manicule; this was nicknamed the "Meta Hand". The character set including the manicule was first trialled in an on-screen keyboard for the TX-0 computer in 1957. In 1959 the same character set was also installed in a Flexowriter intended for use with TX-0. The 1978 MIT space-cadet keyboard contains two manicule keys, one left-pointing and one right-pointing, both used as function keys.

== Computer cursor ==
A version of the hand cursor used in web browsers

A similar pointing hand icon is used as a mouse cursor in many graphical user interfaces to indicate a type of clickable object. The earliest known software release to use this type of cursor was Alan Kay's Smalltalk for the Xerox workstations. Those computers, like the Xerox Star, influenced the user interface of Apple's Lisa and Macintosh desktop computers. Apple used a hand cursor to indicate a clickable hyperlink in their 1987 HyperCard software, a local hypertext framework developed by Bill Atkinson. At Apple, graphic designer Susan Kare created a "clicker" icon similar to a manicule that influenced later cursors for hypertext as well as video games. It became the standard way to represent links when it was adopted by the early web browsers in the 1990s. Experimental author Shelley Jackson observed that while visually similar to a manicule, the often-gloved hand cursor serves not as a textual signpost but as an invitation to make users "encouraged by the image of the hand to feel that they were interacting directly, physically with the image on the screen".

== Gallery ==
Selected images
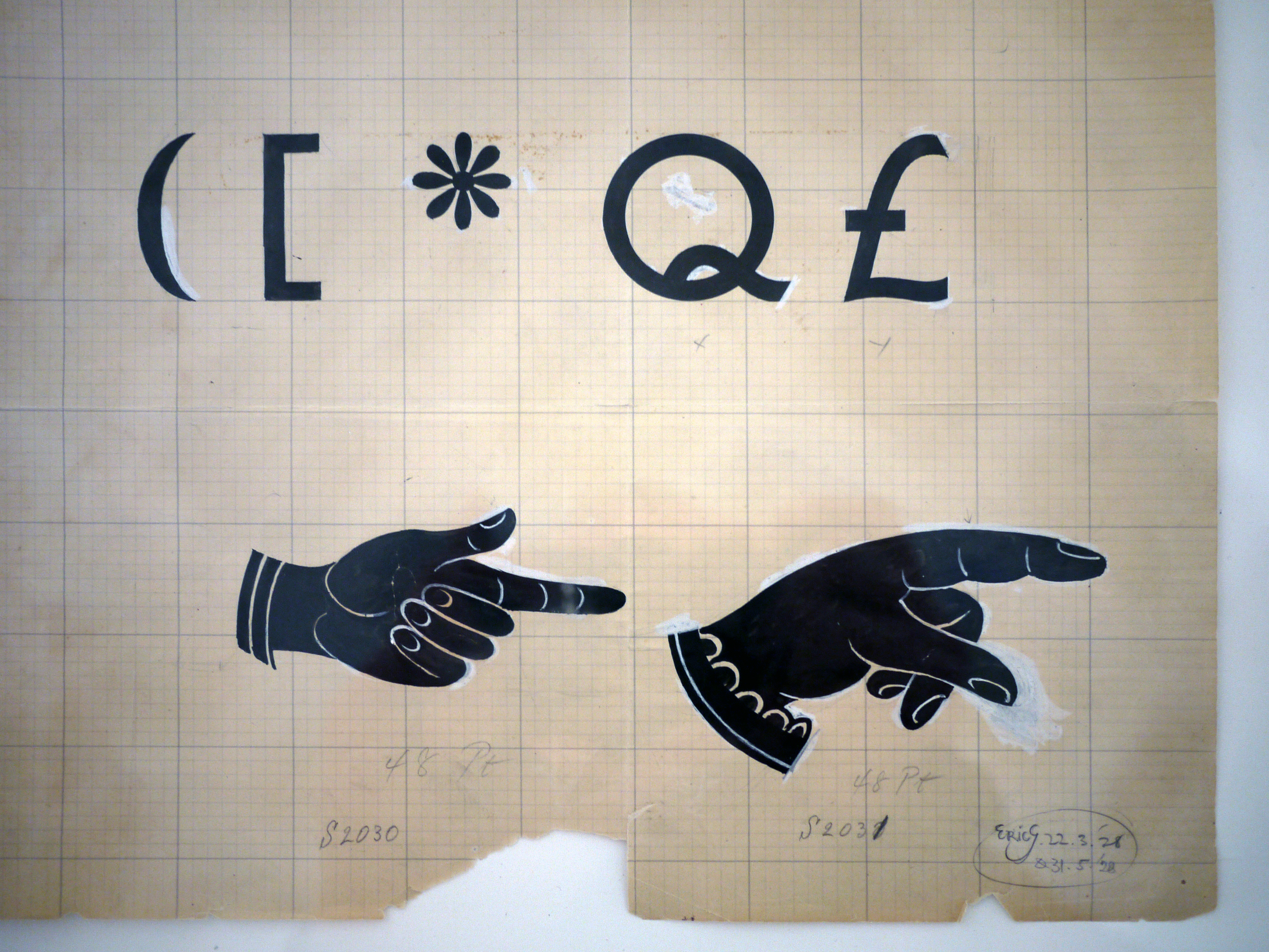
Two manicules drawn by Eric Gill for Gill Sans

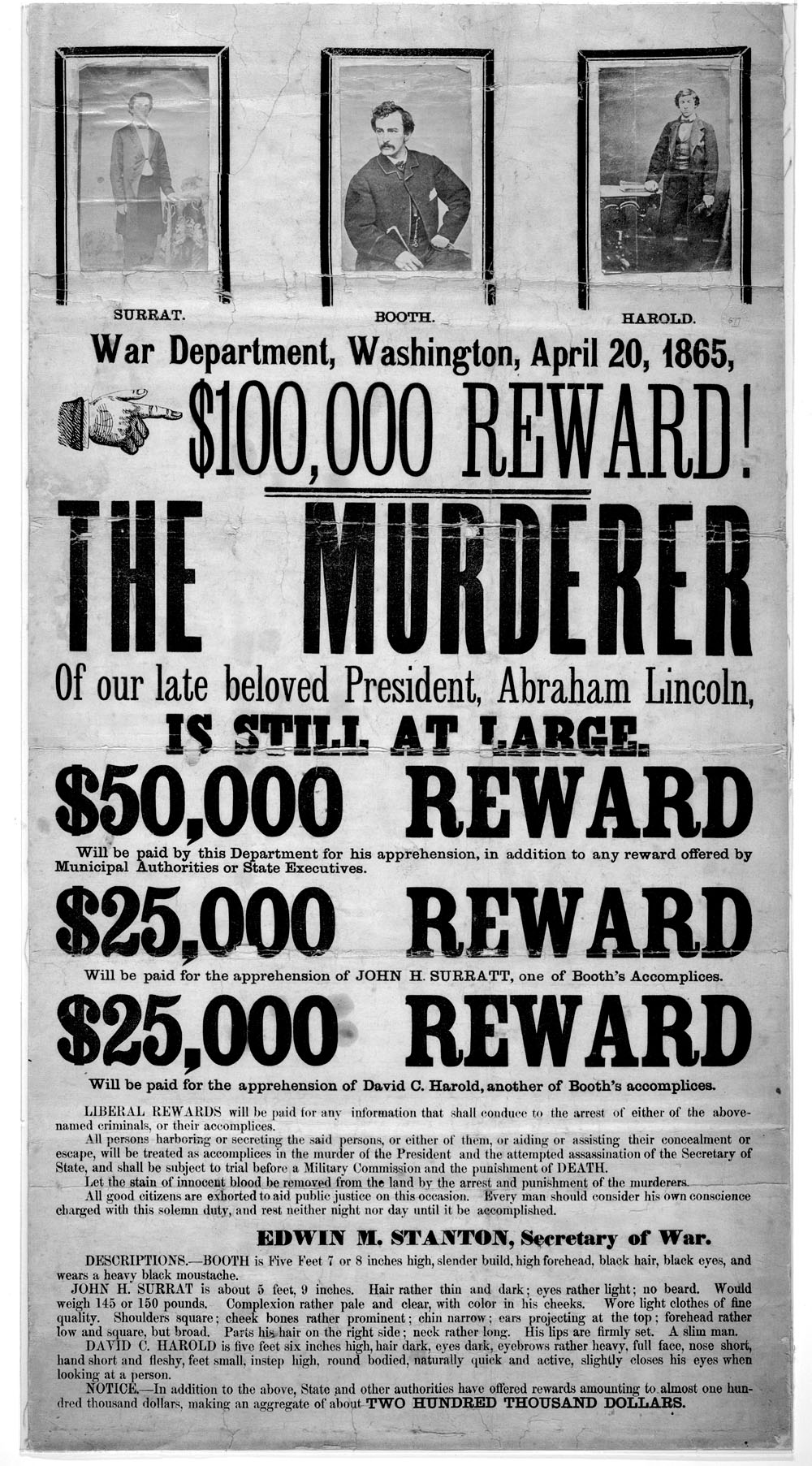
1865 wanted poster of John Wilkes Booth

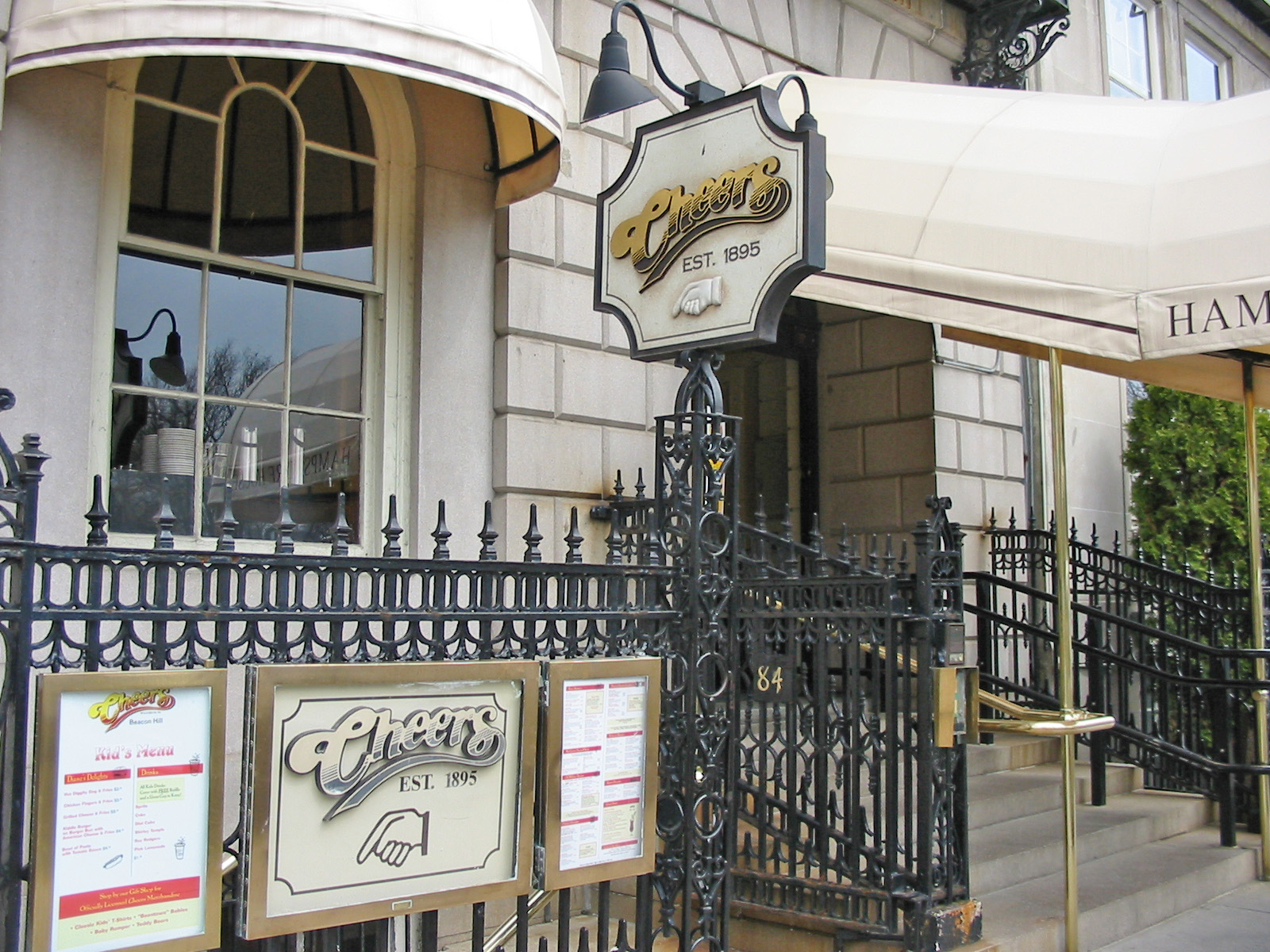
Signage for the bar Cheers (from the Cheers TV series) has a Victorian-era theme.

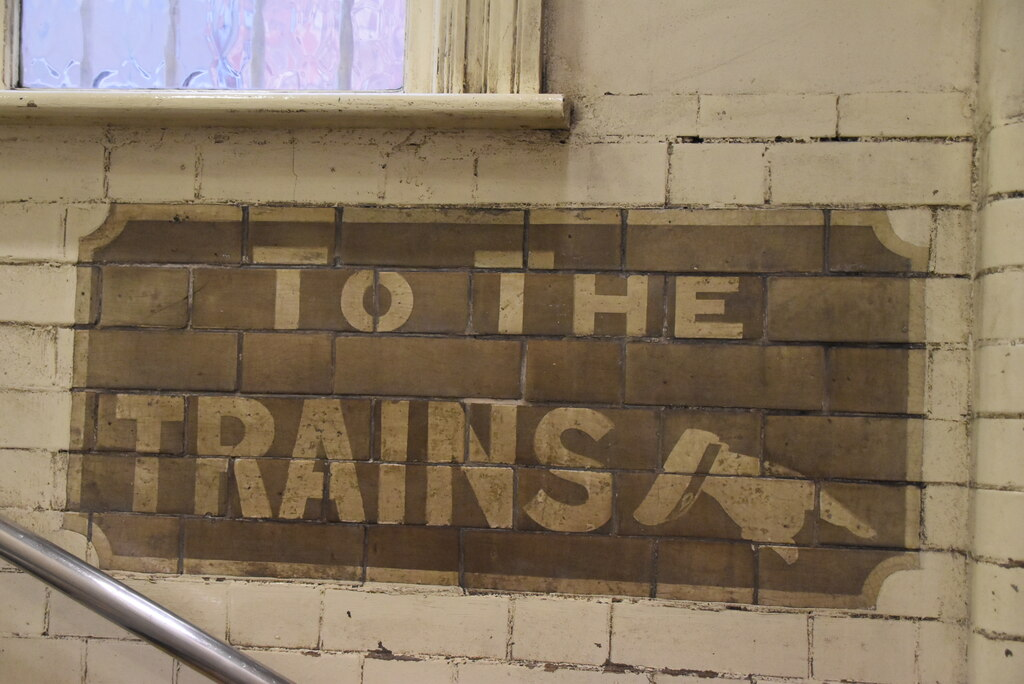
A "To the trains" sign at Stepney Green tube station with a manicule

== Unicode ==
The Unicode Consortium added many popular symbols into the first version of their standard character set, which Apple had made available on their mass market Macintosh home computer and LaserWriter printer for several years. Unicode (version 1.0, 1991) included six "pointing index" characters in the Miscellaneous Symbols block.

- U+261A ☚ BLACK LEFT POINTING INDEX
- U+261B ☛ BLACK RIGHT POINTING INDEX
- U+261C ☜ WHITE LEFT POINTING INDEX
- U+261D ☝︎ WHITE UP POINTING INDEX (with U+FE0E ︎ VARIATION SELECTOR-15 to assert text style [see § Emoji, below])
- U+261E ☞ WHITE RIGHT POINTING INDEX
- U+261F ☟ WHITE DOWN POINTING INDEX

In 2006, chief technical officer Mark Davis commented on Japanese image characters unavailable in Unicode, "There are a number of symbol sets that are in widespread use, but currently can only be mapped to [non-Unicode] characters on input." Unicode 6.0 (2010) added hundreds of emoji characters to the specification, including four more pointing hands in Miscellaneous Symbols and Pictographs:

- U+1F446 👆 WHITE UP POINTING BACKHAND INDEX
- U+1F447 👇 WHITE DOWN POINTING BACKHAND INDEX
- U+1F448 👈 WHITE LEFT POINTING BACKHAND INDEX
- U+1F449 👉 WHITE RIGHT POINTING BACKHAND INDEX

Unicode 7.0 (2014) added several more indexes to the Miscellaneous Symbols and Pictographs block. These additions built on Unicode's support for the Zapf Dingbats widely used in laser printers, to add compatibility with the Wingdings and Webdings fonts introduced by Microsoft:

- U+1F597 🖗 WHITE DOWN POINTING LEFT HAND INDEX
- U+1F598 🖘 SIDEWAYS WHITE LEFT POINTING INDEX
- U+1F599 🖙 SIDEWAYS WHITE RIGHT POINTING INDEX
- U+1F59A 🖚 SIDEWAYS BLACK LEFT POINTING INDEX
- U+1F59B 🖛 SIDEWAYS BLACK RIGHT POINTING INDEX
- U+1F59C 🖜 BLACK LEFT POINTING BACKHAND INDEX
- U+1F59D 🖝 BLACK RIGHT POINTING BACKHAND INDEX
- U+1F59E 🖞 SIDEWAYS WHITE UP POINTING INDEX
- U+1F59F 🖟 SIDEWAYS WHITE DOWN POINTING INDEX
- U+1F5A0 🖠 SIDEWAYS BLACK UP POINTING INDEX
- U+1F5A1 🖡 SIDEWAYS BLACK DOWN POINTING INDEX
- U+1F5A2 🖢 BLACK UP POINTING BACKHAND INDEX
- U+1F5A3 🖣 BLACK DOWN POINTING BACKHAND INDEX

Unicode 13.0 (2020) added a three-part index (🯁🯂🯃) in the Symbols for Legacy Computing block:

- U+1FBC1 🯁 LEFT THIRD WHITE RIGHT POINTING INDEX
- U+1FBC2 🯂 MIDDLE THIRD WHITE RIGHT POINTING INDEX
- U+1FBC3 🯃 RIGHT THIRD WHITE RIGHT POINTING INDEX

=== Emoji ===
Five Unicode manicule characters have emoji forms, including all four introduced in Unicode 6.0. The upward pointing index from Unicode 1.0 also has an emoji form, and is often used to mean the word this. All five have standardised variants for text and emoji presentation. Five other selectors allow a skin tone to be specified for the emoji variant. The tones are drawn from the Fitzpatrick scale for susceptibility to UV light. For example, ☝︎, ☝️, ☝🏻, ☝🏼, ☝🏽, ☝🏾, and ☝🏿 are all the same character, U+261D ☝︎ WHITE UP POINTING INDEX, with different selectors applied.

Emoji variation sequences
U+	261D	1F446	1F447	1F448	1F449
default appearance (Note: with no variation selector applied. This is the default of the web browser being used: for example, Android displays 261D in emoji form)	☝	👆	👇	👈	👉
base+VS15 (text variation selector)	☝︎	👆︎	👇︎	👈︎	👉︎
base+VS16 (emoji variation selector)	☝️	👆️	👇️	👈️	👉️

== See also ==
- Miscellaneous Technical – Unicode character block, which includes U+23FF ⏿ OBSERVER EYE SYMBOL
- Arrow (symbol) – Graphical symbol or pictogram used to point or indicate direction
- Hand (hieroglyph) – Egyptian hieroglyph
- Obelus – Historical annotation mark or symbol (text pointer with various meanings)
- V sign – Hand sign (victory, peace or insult)
- Yad – Jewish ritual pointer in the shape of a hand pointing

== Sources ==
- Berger, Sidney E. (2023). "Fist". The Dictionary of the Book: A Glossary for Book Collectors, Booksellers, Librarians, and Others (Second ed.). Rowman & Littlefield. ISBN 9781538151334.
- Boardley, John (27 January 2020). "Point, Don't Point". I Love Typography.
- Boluk, Stephanie; LeMieux, Patrick (2017). "About, Within, Around, Without". Metagaming: Playing, Competing, Spectating, Cheating, Trading, Making, and Breaking Videogames. University of Minnesota Press. Archived from the original on 7 October 2025.
- Boorde, Andrew (10 August 2022) [1502]. The Breviarie of Health. London: W. Powell – via archive.org. "Copy in McGill Library's Osler Library of the History of Medicine, Room Collection: Two 'books' (in one vol.) with sep. foliation and 2nd title page: 'The seconde Boke of the Breuyary of Health, named the Extrauagantes foloweth.' The last quire in bk.i is Q, the first in bk.ii is R, followed by B, C, D. Woodcut border on title-pages, one illustr. and initials. From the Huth collection, with bk.-plate; bought Nov. 1911. Inserted: letters from the Librarian, R.C.P., and one from Mr. R.L. Poole concerning the statement, on leaf 123, that bk.i was 'examined in Oxford' in 1546."
- Bourne, Claire M. L. (5 June 2020). Typographies of Performance in Early Modern England (1 ed.). Oxford University Press. doi:10.1093/oso/9780198848790.001.0001. ISBN 978-0-19-884879-0.
- Cicero. "Paradoxa stoicorum" (circa 1400) [manuscript]. Digital Scriptorium, ID: BANC MS UCB 085, pp. 1r–5v. Berkeley, CA: Bancroft Library, University of California, Berkeley. 1966. Previous call number: f2MS AC13 c5. - G.
- Cohen, Kris (2025). Human in Bits. Duke University Press. ISBN 9781478061076.
- Cooperrider, Kensy (30 August 2023). "Fifteen Ways of Looking at a Pointing Gesture". Public Journal of Semiotics. 10 (2): 40–84. doi:10.37693/pjos.2023.10.25120 (inactive 30 April 2026).
- Conrad, Eric (2019). "The Poet as Printer's Fist: Walt Whitman's Indicative Hand". Nineteenth-Century Literature. 74 (1): 54–86. doi:10.1525/ncl.2019.74.1.54. ISSN 0891-9356. JSTOR 26860254.
- Conrau-Lewis, Kyle (23 February 2021). "The Index in the Premodern and Modern World". Oxford Research Encyclopedia of Literature. Oxford University Press. doi:10.1093/acrefore/9780190201098.013.1224. ISBN 978-0-19-020109-8. Archived from the original on 13 August 2021.
- Davis, Mark; Holbrook, Ned, eds. (4 September 2025). "Unicode® Technical Standard #51: Unicode Emoji". Unicode 17.0. Revision 29. Archived from the original on 30 June 2020.
- Dennis, J.B. (27 August 1959). New Flexowriter Type Face (PDF) (Technical report). Massachusetts Institute of Technology. MIT memo no. M-5001-11.
- Glaister, Geoffrey Ashall (2001) [1979]. "digit: 2.". Encyclopedia of the Book (2nd ed.).
- Goldberg, Adele; Kay, Alan, eds. (March 1976). Smalltalk-72 Instruction Manual (PDF). Xerox Palo Alto Research Center. Archived (PDF) from the original on 12 September 2025.
- Gilmore, J.T.; Savell, R.E. (6 October 1959). The Lincoln Writer (Technical report). Massachusetts Institute of Technology Lincoln Laboratory. DTIC accession no. AD0235247.
- Hoff, Renske A. (2025). Involving Readers: Practices of Reading, Use, and Interaction in Early Modern Dutch Bibles (1522–1546). BRILL. doi:10.1163/9789004696525_005. ISBN 978-90-04-69652-5.
- Hollandbeck, Andy (23 September 2021). "In a Word: 4 Unusual Punctuation Marks". The Saturday Evening Post.
- Houston, Keith (2013). Shady Characters: The Secret Life of Punctuation, Symbols, and Other Typographical Marks. W. W. Norton & Company. ISBN 978-0-393-06442-1.
- Houston, Keith (2025). Face with Tears of Joy: A Natural History of Emoji (First ed.). W.W. Norton & Company. ISBN 978-1-324-07514-1.
- Jackson, Shelley (2020). "I Hold It Toward You: A Show of Hands". In Tabbi, Joseph (ed.). The Bloomsbury Handbook of Electronic Literature. Bloomsbury Academic. ISBN 9781474230278.
- Lehmann, Christian (16 January 2022). "Lexicography". www.christianlehmann.eu. Archived from the original on 23 August 2025.
- McConchie, Roderick W. (2019). Discovery in haste: English medical dictionaries and lexicographers 1547 to 1796. Lexicographica. Berlin: De Gruyter. ISBN 978-3-11-063578-2.
- McHenry, Robert (23 December 2015). "The Art of the Cross-Reference". The Fortnightly Review. Archived from the original on 30 November 2025.
- Miller, Sylvia K. (1 June 1998). "Transforming Print Encyclopedias into Successful Electronic Reference Products". The Journal of Electronic Publishing. 3 (4). doi:10.3998/3336451.0003.402.
- McPharlin, Paul (1942). Roman Numerals, Typographic Leaves and Pointing Hands : some notes on their origin, history, and contemporary use. Typophile Chap Books: VII. Typophiles.
- Moon, David A.; Wechsler, Allan C. (April 1981). Operating the Lisp Machine. MIT Artificial Intelligence Laboratory. hdl:1721.1/41042. WP-209.
- Ross, Morgan Allison (19 November 2025). "Bostonians React To Odd Hand On Cheers Sign". www.comicsands.com.
- Prince, Alan; Smolensky, Paul (2004). Optimality Theory: Constraint Interaction in Generative Grammar. Blackwell. (also Optimality Theory: Constraint Interaction in Generative Grammar (PDF) (Technical report). Rutgers University Center for Cognitive Science and Computer Science Department. 2002.)
- Seddon, Tony (16 August 2016). Essential Type: An Illustrated Guide to Understanding and Using Fonts. Yale University Press. ISBN 978-0-300-22237-1.
- Sherman, William (2005). "Toward a History of the Manicule" (PDF). Centre for Editing Lives and Letters, University College London. Archived (PDF) from the original on 27 September 2007.
- Sherman, William H. (2008). Used Books: Marking Readers in Renaissance England. Material texts. University of Pennsylvania Press. ISBN 978-0-8122-4043-6.
- Smith, Margaret M.; Woudhuysen, H. R. (2010). "Index". In Suarez, Michael Felix (ed.). The Oxford companion to the book. Oxford: Oxford University Press. ISBN 978-0-19-860653-6.
- Stallybrass, Peter (2002). "Books and Scrolls: Navigating the Bible". In Orgel, Stephen (ed.). Books and Readers in Early Modern England: Material Studies. University of Pennsylvania Press. pp. 42–79. doi:10.2307/j.ctt3fh9mt.5. ISBN 978-0-8122-1794-0. JSTOR j.ctt3fh9mt.5.
- Suignard, Michel (15 February 2011). "Wingdings and Webdings Symbols" (PDF). Unicode Technical Committee. ISO/IEC JTC1/SC2/WG2. Archived (PDF) from the original on 7 July 2021.
- Trumble, Angus (6 August 2024). The Finger: A Handbook. Macmillan + ORM. ISBN 978-1-4299-4561-5. Archived from the original on 1 February 2026.
- "Unicode Data 1.0.0". Unicode® 1.0. Mountain View, California: The Unicode Consortium. 2004 [October 1991]. Archived from the original on 14 September 2021.
- "Unicode Data 6.0.0". Unicode® 6.0.0. Mountain View, California: The Unicode Consortium. 31 January 2012. ISBN 978-1-936213-02-3. Archived from the original on 28 July 2025.
- "Unicode Data 7.0.0". Unicode® 7.0.0. Mountain View, California: The Unicode Consortium. 16 June 2014. ISBN 978-1-936213-09-2. Archived from the original on 5 May 2018.
- "Unicode Data 13.0.0". Unicode® 13.0.0. Mountain View, California: The Unicode Consortium. 10 March 2020. ISBN 978-1-936213-26-9. Archived from the original on 11 March 2020.
- Vanderburgh, A. (1 July 1958). "The Lincoln Keyboard—A Typewriter Keyboard Designed for Computers Input Flexibility". Communications of the ACM. 1 (7). Association for Computing Machinery. doi:10.1145/368873.368879.
