= Saline station =

- Detroit, Hillsdale and Indiana Railroad-Saline Depot
- U.S. National Register of Historic Places
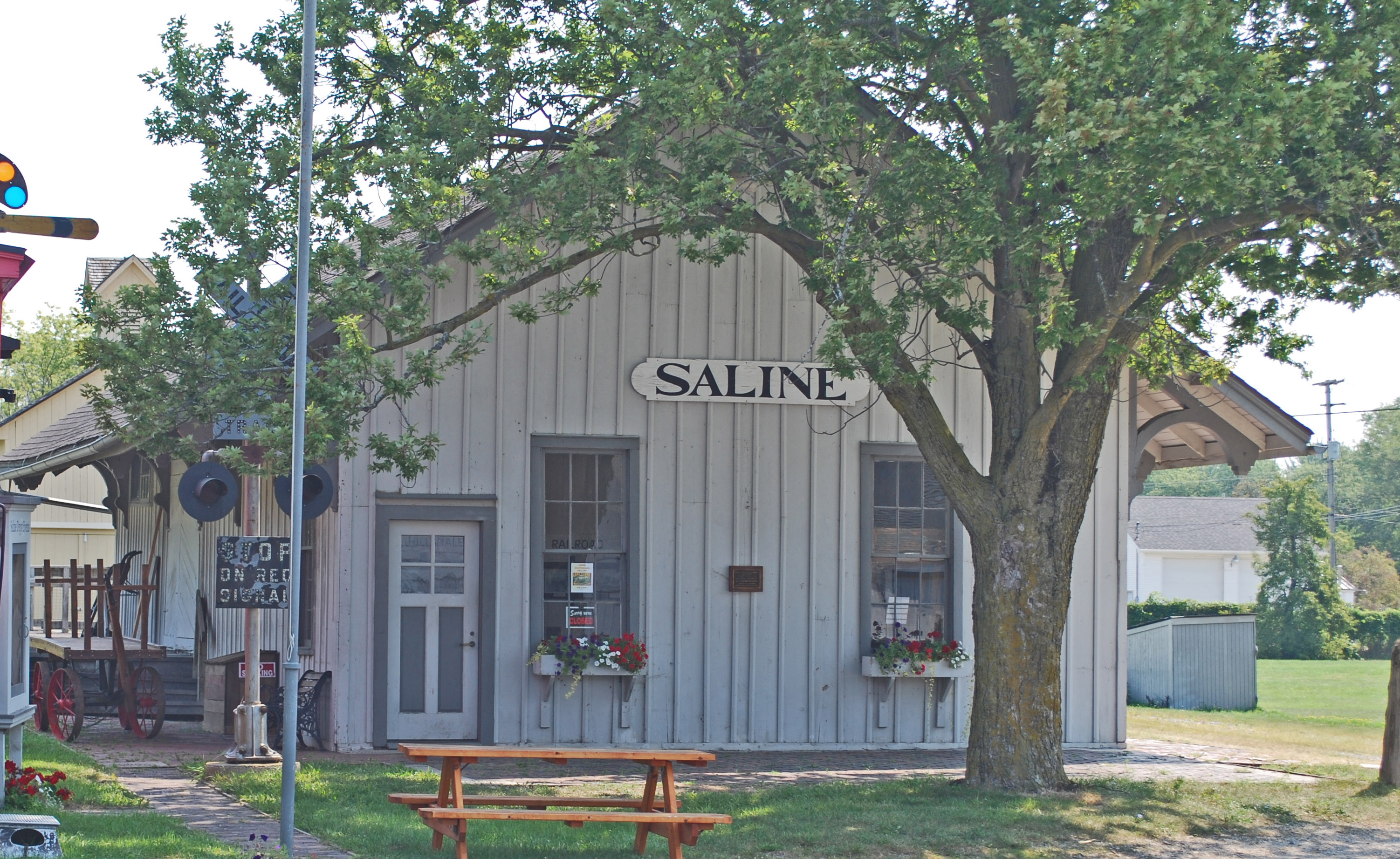
- Interactive map
- Location: 402 N. Ann Arbor St., Saline, Michigan
- Coordinates: 42°10′18″N 83°47′00″W
- Area: less than one acre
- Built: 1870
- Architectural style: Late Victorian
- MPS: Saline MRA
- NRHP reference No.: 94000619
- Added to NRHP: June 17, 1994

The Saline station, also known as the Detroit, Hillsdale and Indiana Railroad-Saline Depot, is a former railroad depot located at 402 North Ann Arbor Street in Saline, Michigan. It was listed on the National Register of Historic Places in 1994. The building now houses the Saline Depot Museum.

== History ==
The Detroit, Hillsdale and Indiana Railroad arrived in Saline in 1870. This railway, likely created solely to raise subscription funds from the communities along its right-of-way, was controlled by the Michigan Central Railroad. Along with the rail lines, the railroad constructed this depot in Saline. The Detroit, Hillsdale and Indiana Railroad went bankrupt in 1875 (likely a planned maneuver), and was sold to the Detroit, Hillsdale, and South Western Railroad, which in 1881 leased the line in perpetuity to the Lake Shore and Michigan Southern Railway. When the rail line was built, Saline's economy temporarily boomed, and by 1876, Saline was shipping 5000 barrels of apples and 500 carloads of wheat per year. However, the construction of a new line through nearby Milan in 1880 cut into the shipping from Saline, and Saline went into a decline in the 1880s.

In 1914, the Lake Shore and Michigan Southern Railway lease was assumed by the New York Central Railroad. By this time, demand for rail service was in a steady decline, and passenger service on the route was discontinued in 1930. In the late 1930s, the original passenger room burned and the railroad added a new exterior wall in what was formerly the interior. In 1960, the Michigan Central acquired the line through Saline, including the depot, and closed the station in 1961. In 1962, the last scheduled train passed through the Saline section of the line. Michigan Central sold the depot to Saline Mercantile Company who used it for a garden shop, but still leased a small office for the occasions when a switch engine came through. In 1967, the railroad completely abandoned the track.

In the early 1970s, Saline Mercantile sold the depot to mill owners David and Dean Zahn, who rented out the freight section of the depot for storage. In 1980, the Zahn family gave the depot to the Saline Historic District Commission and sold the land to the City of Saline. In 1982, puppeteer Meredith Bixby leased the building, and from 1983 to 1990, the Saline Area Players used it. The city rehabilitated the building, and beginning in 1995 leased it to the Saline Area Historical Society for use as a museum.

== Description ==
The Saline Depot is a single story, timber frame building with a steeply pitched gable roof. The depot measures fifty-three feet by twenty-nine and a half feet, and originally consisted of a freight warehouse on one end and small office/waiting room area on the other. The freight storage area is accessed on the track side through a double-door, which is flanked by tall double fixed windows. On the opposite side are two sets of freight doors, between which is a single horizontal window with six lights. The office/waiting room is accessed on the end of the building through a paneled door with a large light in its upper portion. Near the door are two double-hung windows.

Preceding station	New York Central Railroad	Following station
Bridgewater toward Hillsdale, MI	Ypsilanti Branch	Ypsilanti Terminus
