= Saline High School (Michigan) =

High school in Michigan, United States

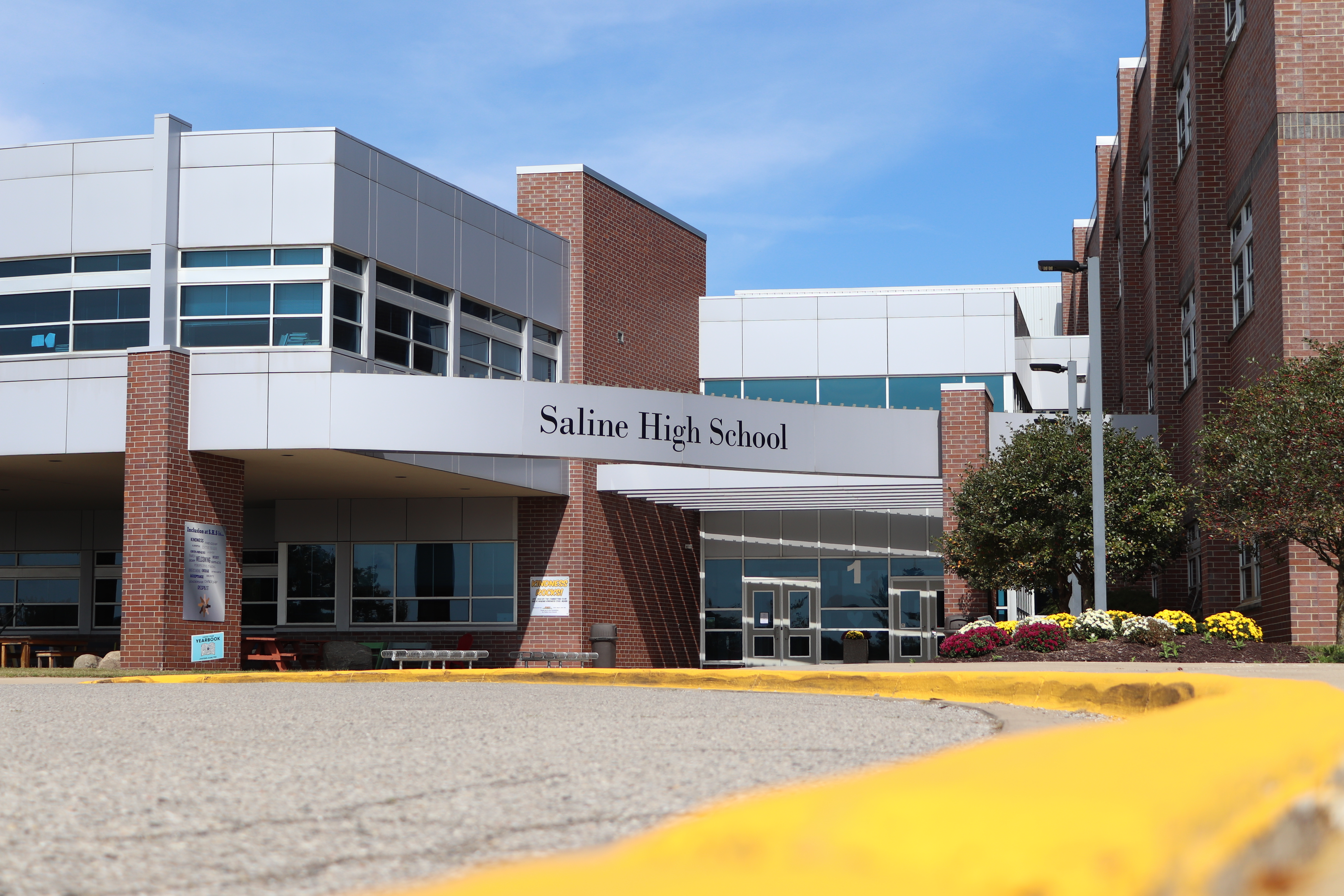
- Saline High School's Front Entryway on September 19, 2023

Location
- 1300 Campus Parkway; Saline, Michigan 48176; United States; 42°11′09″N 83°45′11″W

Information
- Type: Public High School
- Established: August 2004
- School district: Saline Area Schools
- Superintendent: Rachel Kowalski
- Principal: Megan DeGrand
- Teaching staff: 129
- Grades: 9-12
- Enrollment: 1,475 (2025–2026)
- Student to teacher ratio: 1 : 11.43
- Colors: Navy blue and Gold
- Athletics conference: SEC Conference
- Nickname: Hornets
- Website: School website

Student assessments
- 2021–22 school year Change vs. prior year

M-STEP 11th grade proficiency rates (Science / Social Studies)
- Advanced %: 37.7 / 24.9
- Proficient %: 32.7 / 42.7
- PR. Proficient %: 12.0 / 28.8
- Not Proficient %: 17.5 / 3.7

Average test scores
- SAT Total: 1105.6 (▼ −1.2)

Saline High School is a public high school near Saline, Michigan. The school, a part of the Saline Area Schools, moved to its 47,000 m^{2} (510,000 sq ft) facility on roughly 81 hectares (200 acres) of land on Industrial Drive in August 2004 in Pittsfield Township. It is the 31st largest high school in the state of Michigan by enrollment, and was ranked 20th best high school in the state by US News.

This campus is also the central hub for the South & West Washtenaw Consortium, an organization that offers career and technical education courses at Dexter High School, Chelsea High School and Saline High School. As of 2026, the consortium's director is Kara Stemmer.

== Extracurricular activities ==
=== Athletics ===
- 2017 Baseball State Champions
- 2015 Girls Soccer State Champions,
- 2010, 2011, 2012, 2013, and 2025 Men's Swim and Dive State Champions
- 2009, 2010 and 2014 Women's Swim and Dive State Champions
- 2009 Girls Cross Country State Champions
- 2006 Boys Golf State Champions
- 2006, 2015 Boys Track State Champions
- 1990, 1991 & 2010 Girls Golf State Champions
- 1984 Women's Volleyball State Champions

== Notable alumni ==
- Jennifer Allison, writer of mystery novels
- Chris Baker, National Football League player
- CJ Carr, college football quarterback for the Notre Dame Fighting Irish
- Tommy Carr, college football quarterback for the Michigan Wolverines
- Logan Evans, Seattle Mariners pitcher
- Josh Jackson, former college football quarterback
- Ricky Karcher, Arizona Diamondbacks pitcher
- Bobby Korecky, Major League Baseball player
- Taybor Pepper, National Football League player
- Bonnie Rideout, fiddler
- James Turner, former professional football placekicker
