= Saline, Michigan =

City in the United States

- City
- City of Saline
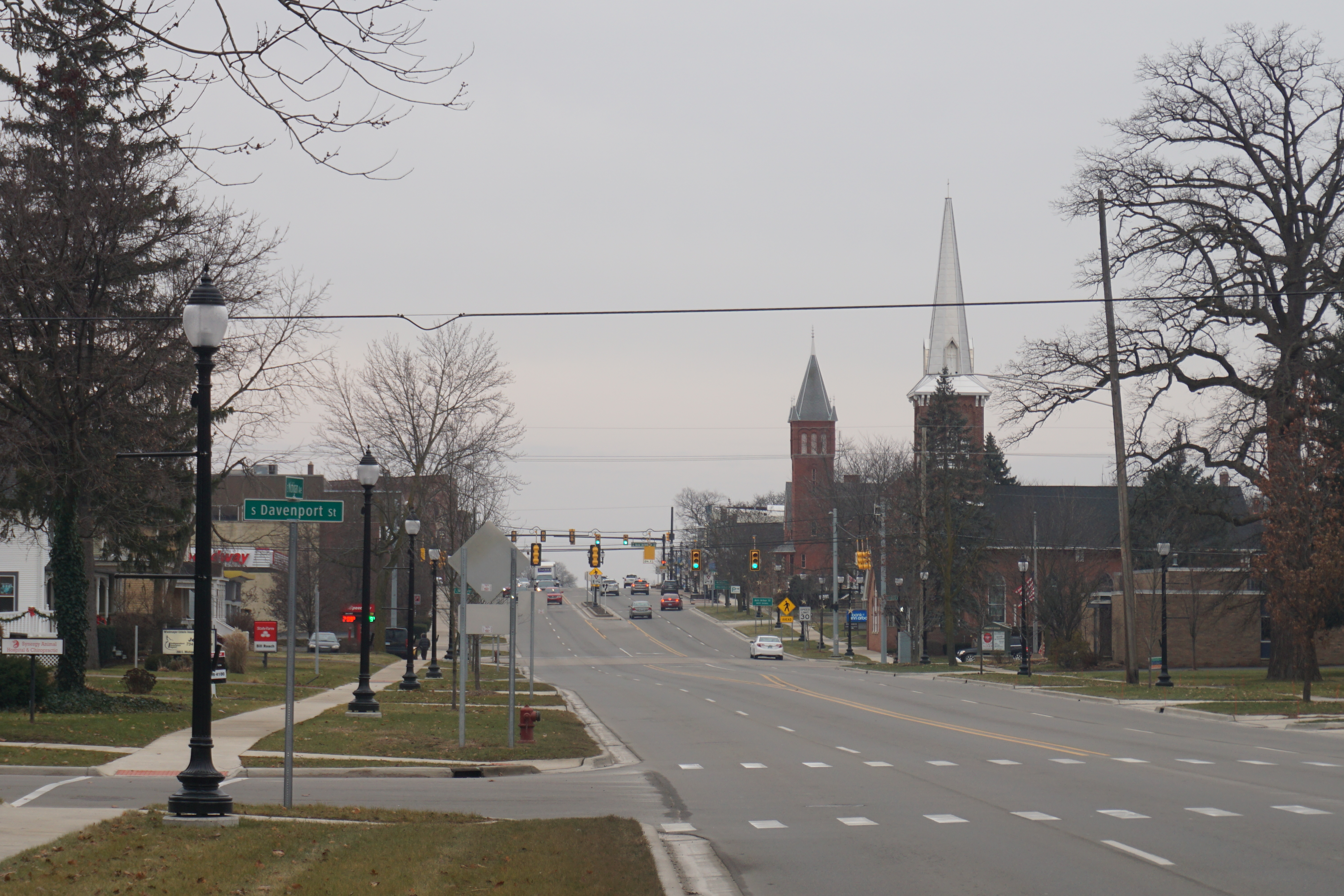
- Downtown Saline along Michigan Avenue

- Seal

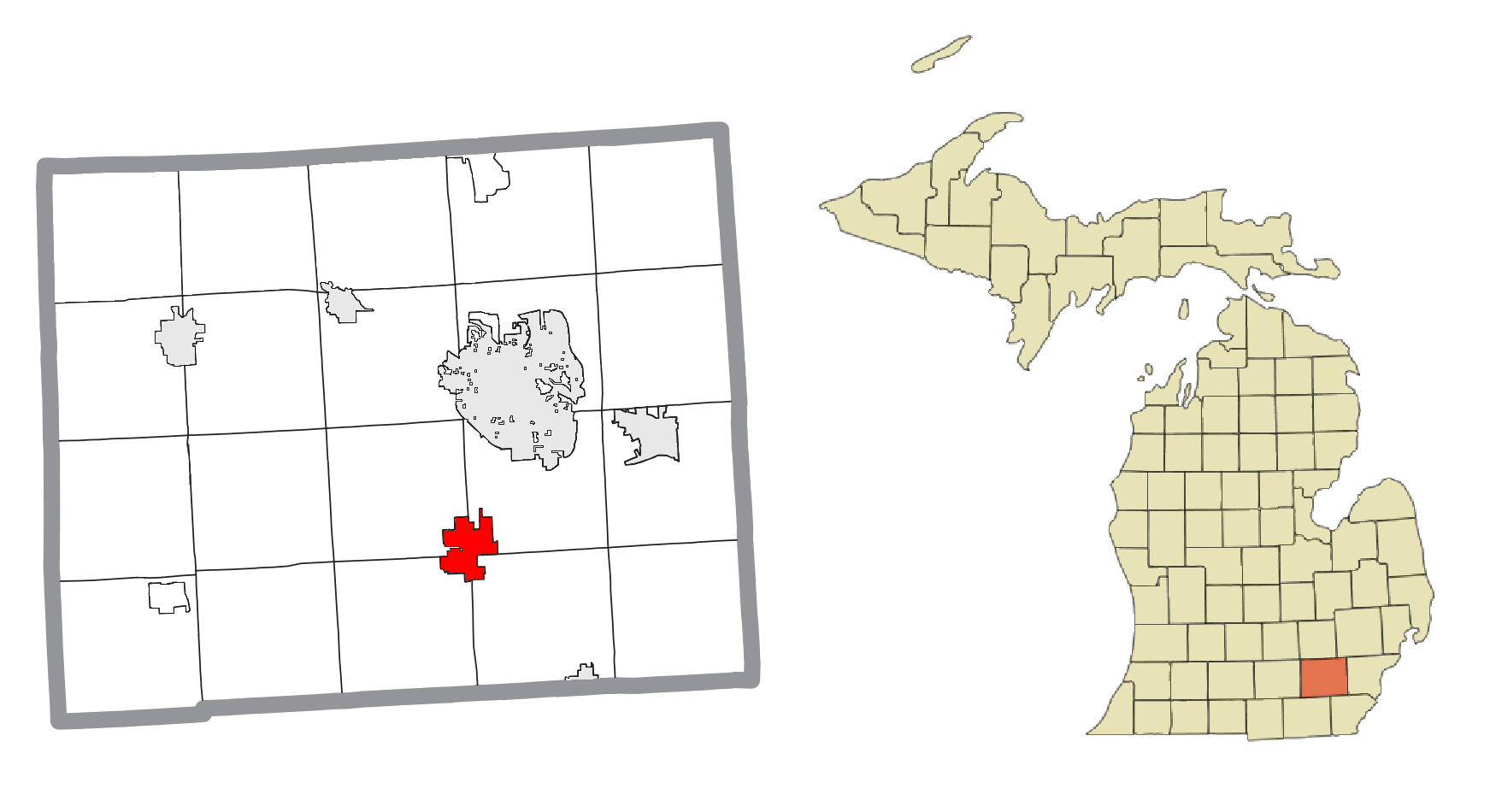
- Location within Washtenaw County

- Location within the State of Michigan Location within the United States
- Coordinates: 42°10′15″N 83°46′47″W
- Country: United States
- State: Michigan
- County: Washtenaw
- Incorporated: 1866 (village); 1931 (city)

Government
  - Type: Council–manager
  - Mayor: Brian Marl
  - Manager: Dan Swallow (Resigned)
  - Chief of Police: Marlene Radzik

Area
  - Total: 4.41 sq mi (11.41 km^{2})
  - Land: 4.34 sq mi (11.23 km^{2})
  - Water: 0.069 sq mi (0.18 km^{2})
- Elevation: 820 ft (250 m)

Population (2020)
  - Total: 8,948
  - Density: 2,064.0/sq mi (796.91/km^{2})
- Time zone: UTC-5 (Eastern (EST))
  - Summer (DST): UTC-4 (EDT)
- ZIP code: 48176
- Area code: 734
- FIPS code: 26-71140
- GNIS feature ID: 0637119
- Website: Official website

Saline (/səˈliːn/ sə-LEEN) is a city in Washtenaw County, Michigan, in the Ann Arbor–Ypsilanti metropolitan area. The population was 8,948 at the 2020 census. The city borders Saline Township to the southwest, and the two are administered autonomously.

== History ==
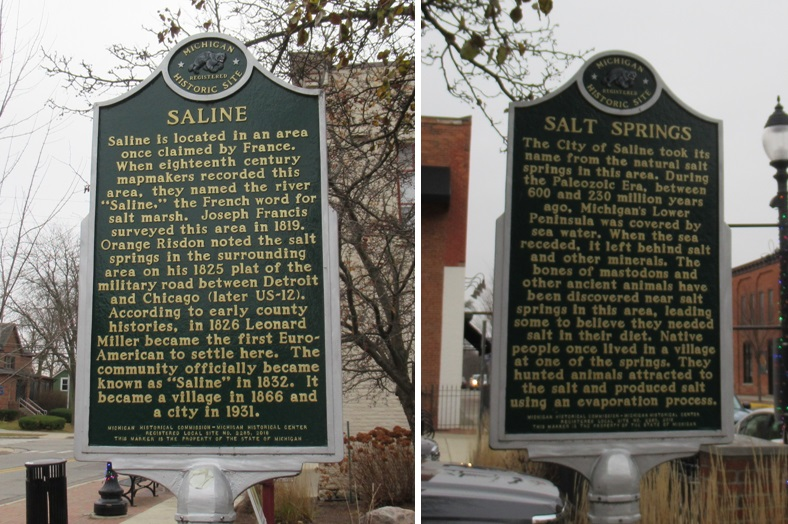
Dual-sided state historic marker

Before the 18th century, Native Americans traveled to what is now Saline to hunt wildlife and gather salt from the salt springs they found nearby. In the 18th century, French explorers canoed up to the area and also harvested the salt. They named the local river Saline ("salty"). Europeans settled the area in the 19th century, most of them from England and Germany. Together with Orange Risdon, a government surveyor generally considered the city's founder, the residents named the settlement Saline, which was officially established in 1832. The settlement was incorporated as a village in 1866. In 1870, railroad service, provided by the Detroit-Hillsdale-&-Indiana Railroad, first reached Saline. In 1875, Salinians built one of the city's most famous landmarks, the Davenport House, sometimes referred to as Curtis Mansion, which was a 2 1/2-story residential building that had a Second-Empire frame.

The town continued to grow, and in 1931 the Village of Saline became the City of Saline. The Saline Fisheries Research Station was built on the site of a pioneer grist mill. Saline had its own newspaper, the Saline Reporter since 1874, but it was shuttered by its owner, Digital First Media, in 2014.

The city is popular for its annual Celtic Festival, which attracts people from all over the U.S. Its sister cities are Brecon, Wales, United Kingdom (established 1966) and Lindenberg, Germany (established 2003).

== Geography ==
According to the United States Census Bureau, the city has an area of 4.41 square miles (11.42 km^{2}), of which 4.33 square miles (11.21 km^{2}) is land and 0.08 square miles (0.21 km^{2}) (1.81%) is water.

The Saline River runs through the city.

=== Major highways ===
- US 12 (East Michigan Avenue) runs briefly through the center of the city.

== Demographics ==
Historical population
Census	Pop.	Note	%±
1880	858		—
1890	706		−17.7%
1900	584		−17.3%
1910	816		39.7%
1920	830		1.7%
1930	1,009		21.6%
1940	1,227		21.6%
1950	1,533		24.9%
1960	2,334		52.3%
1970	4,811		106.1%
1980	6,483		34.8%
1990	6,660		2.7%
2000	8,034		20.6%
2010	8,810		9.7%
2020	8,948		1.6%
U.S. Decennial Census

=== 2020 census ===
As of the 2020 census, Saline had a population of 8,948. The median age was 44.6 years. 20.8% of residents were under the age of 18 and 22.1% of residents were 65 years of age or older. For every 100 females there were 88.2 males, and for every 100 females age 18 and over there were 84.6 males age 18 and over.

100.0% of residents lived in urban areas, while 0.0% lived in rural areas.

There were 3,882 households in Saline, of which 27.5% had children under the age of 18 living in them. Of all households, 47.7% were married-couple households, 16.4% were households with a male householder and no spouse or partner present, and 31.3% were households with a female householder and no spouse or partner present. About 35.2% of all households were made up of individuals, and 18.0% had someone living alone who was 65 years of age or older.

There were 4,187 housing units, of which 7.3% were vacant. The homeowner vacancy rate was 1.0% and the rental vacancy rate was 14.9%.

Racial composition as of the 2020 census
Race	Number	Percent
White	7,825	87.4%
Black or African American	161	1.8%
American Indian and Alaska Native	19	0.2%
Asian	288	3.2%
Native Hawaiian and Other Pacific Islander	4	0.0%
Some other race	74	0.8%
Two or more races	577	6.4%
Hispanic or Latino (of any race)	311	3.5%

=== 2010 census ===
As of the 2010 census, there were 8,810 people, 3,699 households, and 2,336 families residing in the city. The population density was 2,068.1 inhabitants per square mile (798.5/km^{2}). There were 3,923 housing units at an average density of 920.9 per square mile (355.6/km^{2}). The racial makeup of the city was 93.6% White, 1.4% African American, 0.2% Native American, 2.5% Asian, 0.4% from other races, and 1.8% from two or more races. Hispanic or Latino residents of any race were 2.6% of the population.

There were 3,699 households, of which 33.2% had children under the age of 18 living with them, 49.1% were married couples living together, 10.6% had a female householder with no husband present, 3.5% had a male householder with no wife present, and 36.8% were non-families. 32.1% of all households were made up of individuals, and 13.3% had someone living alone who was 65 years of age or older. The average household size was 2.34 and the average family size was 3.00.

The median age in the city was 41.1. 24.5% of residents were under age 18; 7.1% were between the ages of 18 and 24; 24.2% were from 25 to 44; 29.6% were from 45 to 64; and 14.6% were 65 years of age or older. The gender makeup of the city was 47.0% male and 53.0% female.

=== 2000 census ===
As of the 2000 census, there were 8,034 people, 3,148 households, and 2,134 families residing in the city. The population density was 1,736.3 inhabitants per square mile (670.4/km^{2}). There were 3,213 housing units at an average density of 694.4 per square mile (268.1/km^{2}). The racial makeup of the city was 95.69% White, 0.56% African American, 0.32% Native American, 1.94% Asian, 0.05% Pacific Islander, 0.32% from other races, and 1.11% from two or more races. Hispanic or Latino residents of any race were 1.73% of the population.

There were 3,048 households, out of which 38.7% had children under the age of 18 living with them, 54.2% were married couples living together, 10.8% had a female householder with no husband present, and 32.2% were non-families. 27.8% of all households were made up of individuals, and 9.7% had someone living alone who was 65 years of age or older. The average household size was 2.49 persons and the average family size was 3.09 persons.

In the city, 28.6% of the population was under the age of 18, 5.7% was from 18 to 24, 32.6% from 25 to 44, 21.8% from 45 to 64, and 11.3% was 65 years old or older. The median age was 36. For every 100 females, there were 86.6 males. For every 100 females 18 and older, there were 81.2 males.

The median income for a household in the city was $59,382, and the median income for a family was $73,162. Males had a median income of $51,391 versus $32,254 for females. The per capita income for the city was $26,208. About 3.0% of families and 4.0% of the population were below the poverty line, including 4.0% of those under age 18 and 4.3% of those age 65 or over.

== Transportation ==
The Ann Arbor Railroad operates freight service to the Faurencia auto parts manufacturing plant on Maple Road in the north of the city. Amtrak ended its last passenger service to Saline on June 8, 1998.

== Education ==
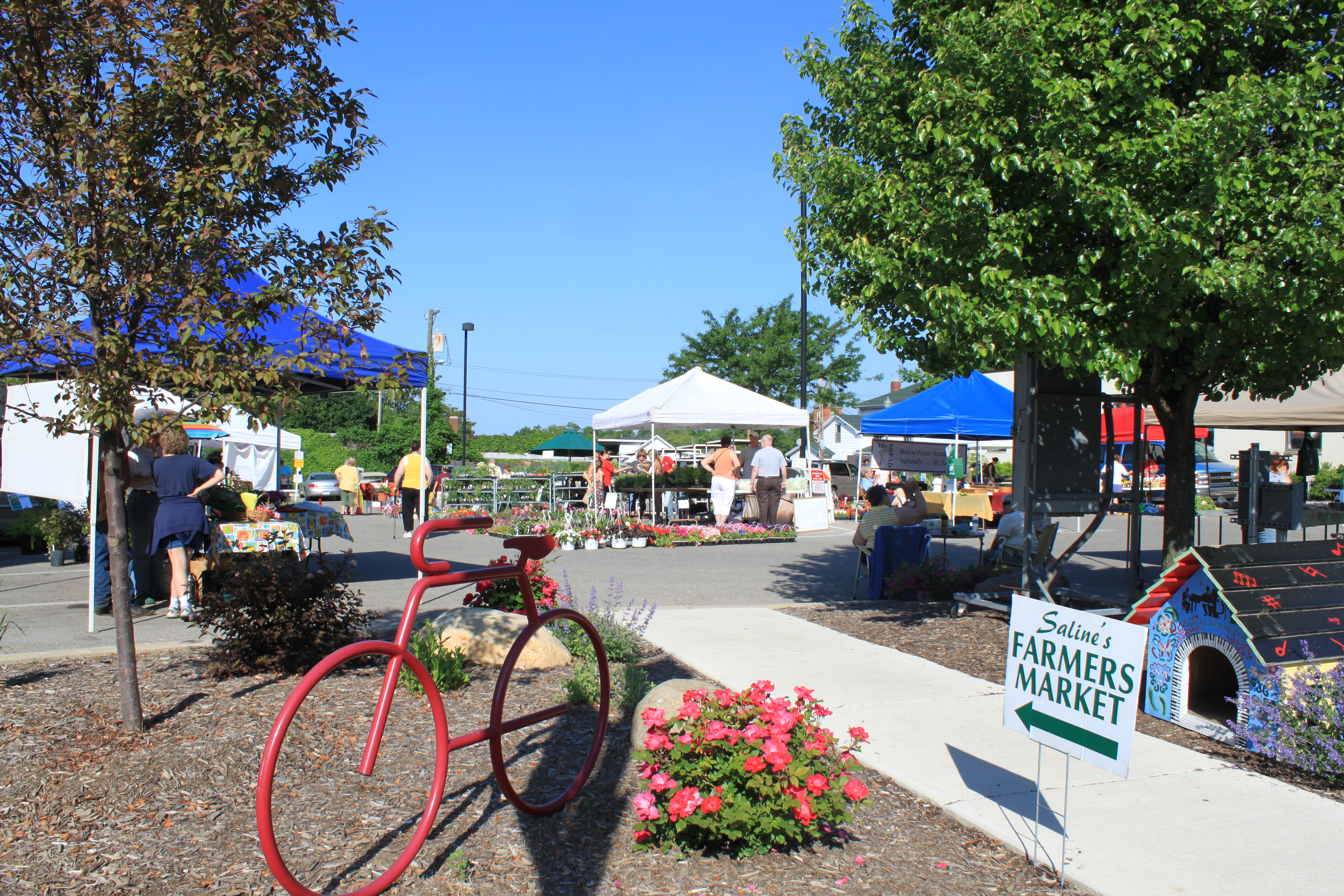
Saline Farmers Market

Saline Area Schools operates the public schools.

District-operated K–3 elementary schools include Harvest, Woodland Meadows, and Pleasant Ridge. Heritage School (4–5), Saline Middle School, and Saline High School (in Pittsfield Charter Township) provide middle school education.

== Notable people ==
- George Matthew Adams, columnist and founder of the George Matthew Adams Newspaper Service
- Jennifer Allison, writer
- Chris Baker, football player
- Meredith Bixby, puppeteer
- Lisa Bonder, professional tennis player and ex-wife of Kirk Kerkorian.
- Frank Jay Haynes, photographer
- Jeremy Kittel, musician
- Bobby Korecky, baseball player
- Ann Pellegreno, aviator
- Taybor Pepper, football player
- Charles Van Riper, pioneer in speech pathology
- Bryan Thao Worra, writer
- CJ Carr, football player
- Bonnie Rideout, musician

== Sister cities ==
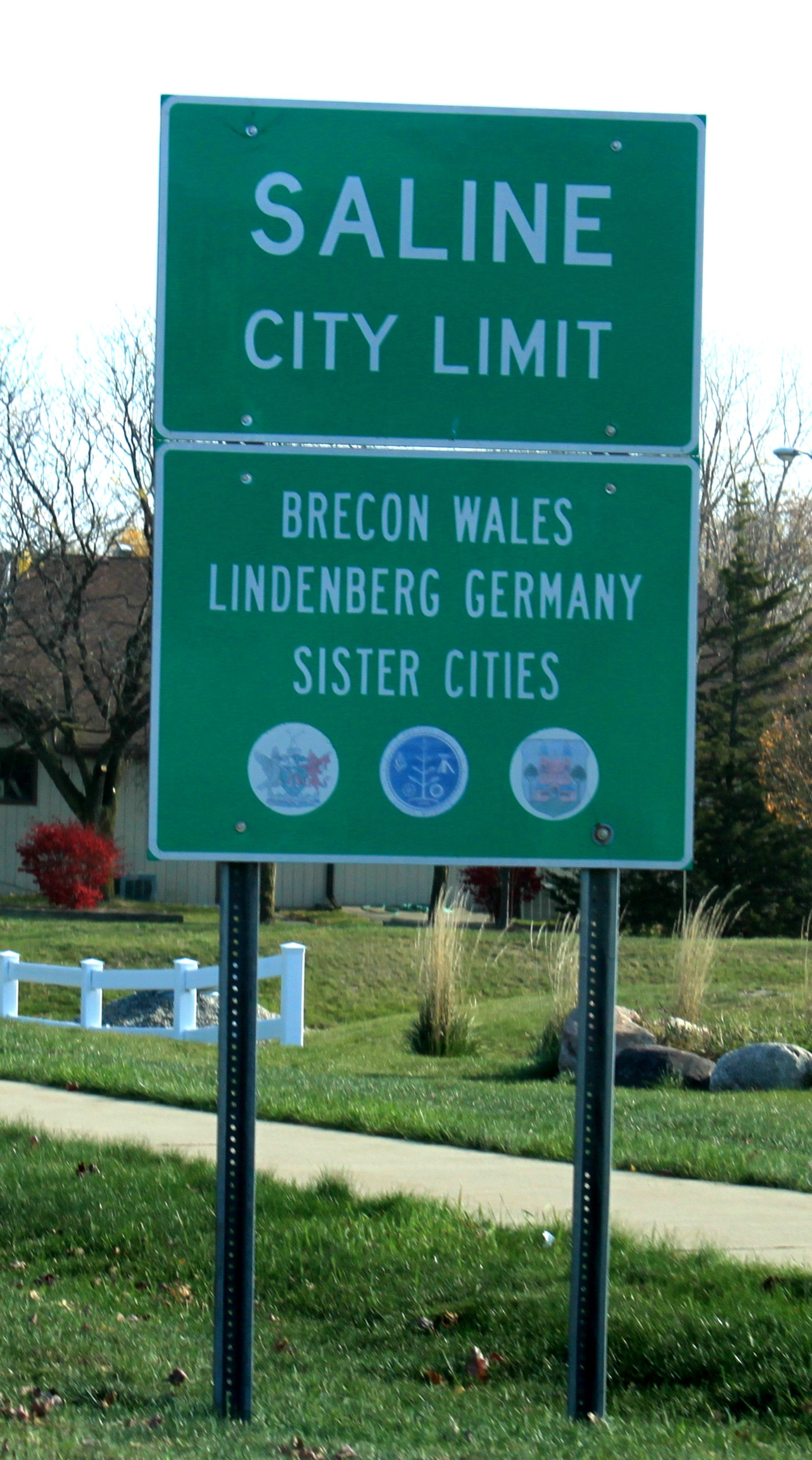
Sister Cities sign, Michigan Ave.

- Brecon, Wales, United Kingdom, since 1966
- Lindenberg im Allgäu, Germany, since 2003

== See also ==
- Rentschler Farm Museum
