= Visteon =

American automotive electronics company

Visteon Corporation

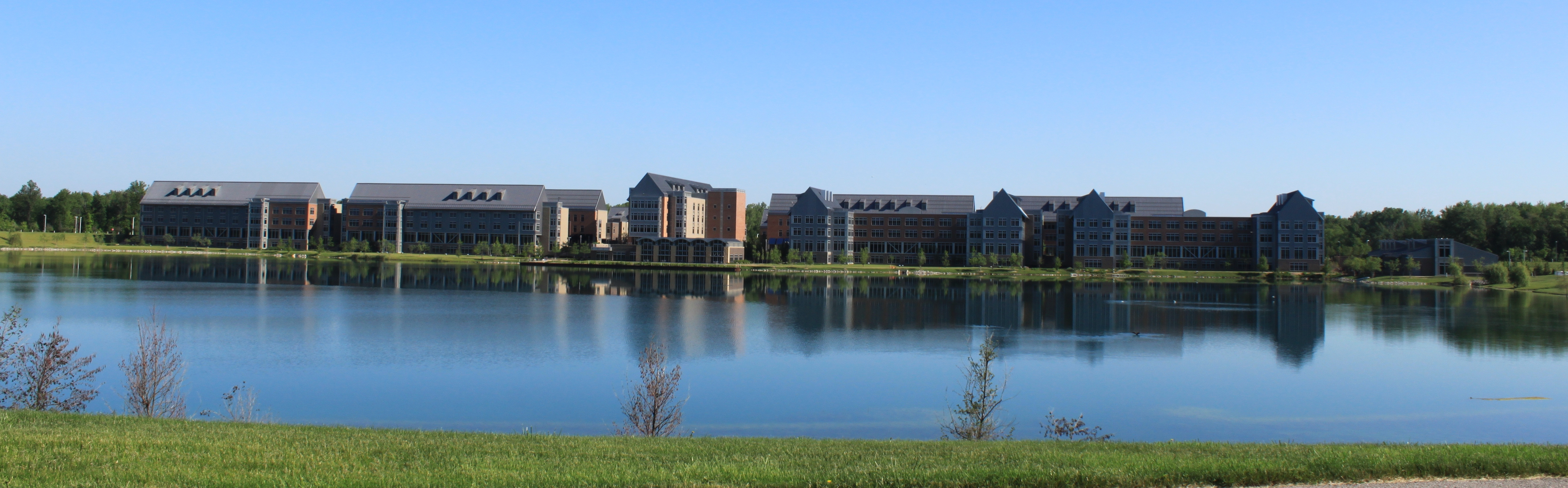
- Visteon corporate campus in Michigan
- Type: Public
- Traded as: Nasdaq: VC; S&P 400 component
- Industry: Automotive industry
- Founded: 2000; 26 years ago in Michigan, US
- Headquarters: Van Buren Township, Michigan, US
- Area served: Worldwide
- Key people: Sachin Lawande (President and CEO), Jerome Rouquet (CFO)
- Products: Automotive cockpit electronics
- Revenue: ▼US$3.77 billion (2025)
- Net income: ▼US$201 million (2025)
- Number of employees: 10,000 (2026)
- Website: visteon.com

Visteon Corporation (VC) is an American global automotive electronics technology company headquartered in Van Buren Township, Michigan. Visteon designs, engineers, and manufactures vehicle cockpit electronics products, connected car services and electrification products for global automotive manufacturers. Visteon operates engineering and manufacturing facilities across the Americas, Europe and Asia.

== History ==
Visteon originated as part of Ford Motor Company, where its business primarily focused on seating, climate control, and automotive interiors. Ford spun off Visteon as an independent automotive supplier in June 2000.

In 2015 and 2016, the company divested its climate and interiors businesses and consolidated its operations around automotive electronics. Visteon's global headquarters is located in Van Buren Township, Michigan. The company also has additional facilities in Mexico, Brazil, Argentina, Portugal, United Kingdom, Germany, France, Slovakia, Bulgaria, Hungary, Tunisia, India, China, Thailand, Korea and Japan.

Visteon’s core business centers on cockpit and vehicle electronics. Its primary product lines include digital instrument clusters, infotainment systems, and integrated digital cockpit platforms, along with automotive display technologies. The company also develops high-performance domain controllers that consolidate multiple cockpit functions onto centralized computing architectures.

In electrification, Visteon designs and supplies battery management systems and related power electronics components for electric and hybrid vehicles.

The company expanded its focus to include software capabilities and artificial intelligence applications within cockpit electronics and vehicle compute platforms.

In 2015, Sachin Lawande became the company's president and CEO.

In 2025, Visteon reported net sales of US$3.768 billion and recorded 86 product launches during the year, along with approximately US$7.4 billion in new business awards.

== Products ==
- Digital instrument clusters
- Automotive display systems (LCD and advanced display technologies)
- Head-up displays
- Infotainment systems
- Integrated digital cockpit platforms
- Human–machine interface (HMI) software
- Cockpit domain controllers and centralized compute platforms
- Telematics control units
- AllGo App store and Connected vehicle software platforms
- Battery management systems (wired and wireless architectures)
- Power electronics components
- Switchable junction boxes
- High-voltage system control electronics
- Artificial intelligence and machine-learning applications integrated within cockpit, driver assistance, and user experience systems

== Restructuring ==
On September 13, 2005, Visteon and Ford reached an agreement whereby seventeen of the less-profitable Visteon plants and six offices would be transferred to an independent business entity called Automotive Components Holdings LLC. This action, intended to assure the long-term viability of Visteon, involved the transfer of 18,000 hourly workers and 5,000 salaried workers to the new entity, reducing Visteon to approximately 52,000 employees worldwide and $11 billion in annual sales. Three of the plants are in Mexico, the remaining plants and six offices are in the US. Automotive Components Holdings (ACH), managed by Ford, was referred to as a "temporary entity", as its purpose was to prepare the plants and facilities for sale. By the end of 2007, all ACH operations had been closed, scheduled for closure, merged at least partially, or sold (two back to Ford), with transactions to be completed by the end of 2008 except for one plant which is to remain an ACH facility until its closure in 2009.

On March 31, 2009, Visteon's UK subsidiary was deemed insolvent, and placed into administration. The UK subsidiary had never been profitable, and the insolvency was the result of the US parent company being unwilling to continue to support the British operation. The administrators, KPMG, immediately moved to close all three Visteon UK factories and made 565 workers redundant. Visteon's profitable UK subsidiary Visteon Engineering Services (VES) remained unaffected by the restructuring.

As a result, workers occupied the plants in Belfast, Northern Ireland, and Enfield, London, and picketed the plant in Basildon, Essex, to gain better redundancy packages.

=== Bankruptcy and emergence ===
The subprime mortgage crisis greatly impacted the auto industry and left Visteon with little demand. During early March 2009, Visteon was delisted from the New York Stock Exchange for trading at extremely low levels. This action came after Visteon shares dropped from 7 to 2 cents. On May 28, 2009, the company filed voluntary petitions to reorganize Visteon Corporation and certain of its U.S. subsidiaries under Chapter 11 of the U.S. Bankruptcy Code. The case was heard in Delaware on May 29, 2009, by Judge Christopher Sontchi, where Visteon was granted Chapter 11 protection.

Visteon completed its reorganization and emerged from Chapter 11 on October 1, 2010.

=== Acquisitions ===
In July 2014, Visteon acquired Johnson Controls electronics division for $265 million. In July 2016, Visteon acquired AllGo Embedded Systems Pvt Ltd.
