= Marjorie Batchelder McPharlin =

Marjorie Batchelder McPharlin (1903–1997) was an American puppeteer and authority on the puppet theater. Her two best known puppetry productions were Aristophanes' The Birds (1933) and Maeterlinck's The Death of Tintagiles (1937). She was the author of many books on puppetry, including The Puppet Theatre Handbook. She was the second honorary president of the Puppeteers of America. Her marriage to the puppeteer Paul McPharlin was in 1948, a few months before his death. Marjorie was also the creator of the hand-rod puppet which was a style Jim Henson took up for The Muppets.

Marjorie Batchelder McPharlin was in attendance and spoke at the first-ever Puppeteers of America Festival in 1935, in Detroit, Michigan.
