= Taybor Pepper =

American football player (born 1994)

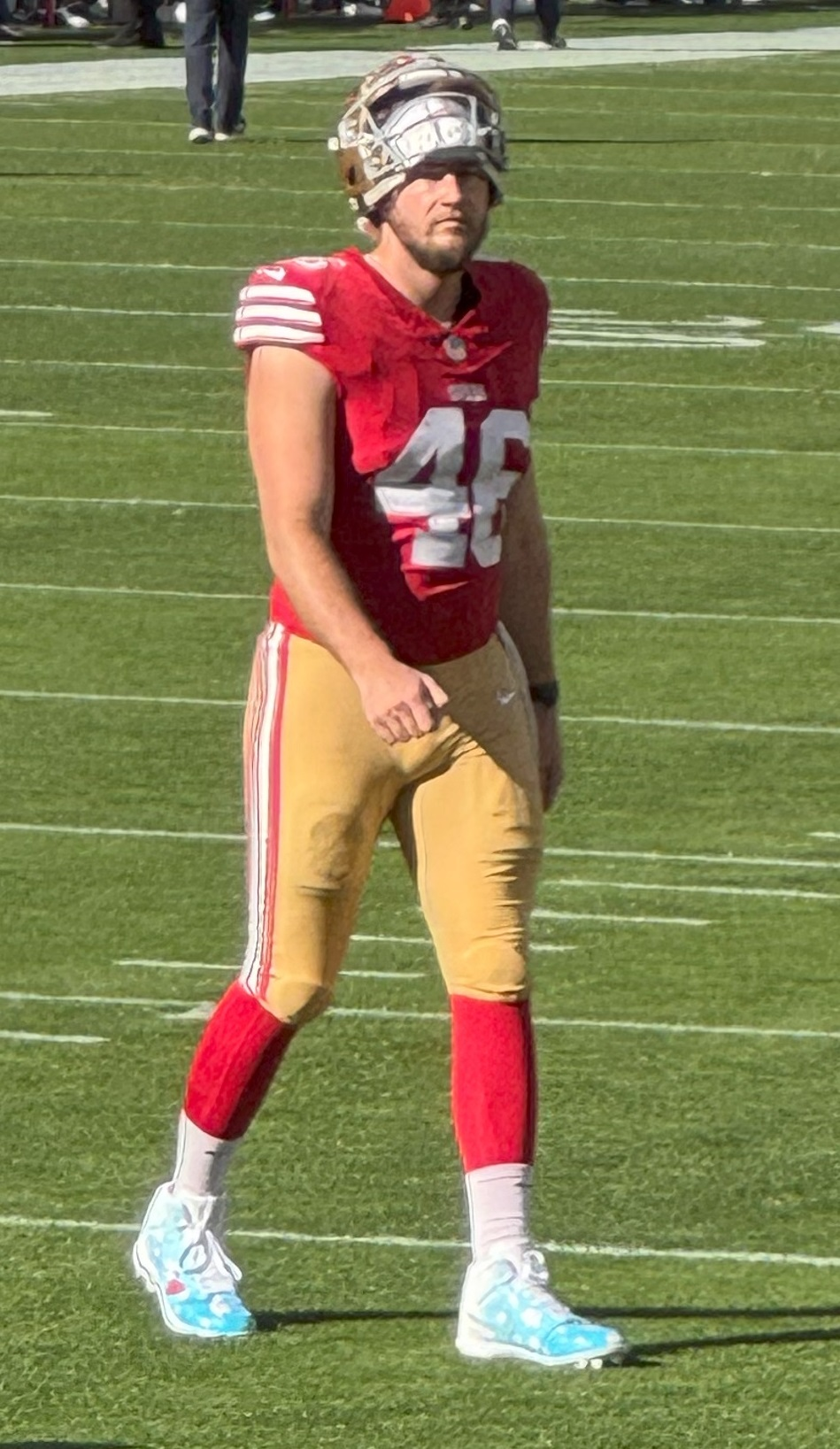
- Pepper with the San Francisco 49ers in 2024

Profile
- Position: Long snapper

Personal information
- Born: May 28, 1994 (age 32); Urbana, Illinois, U.S.
- Listed height: 6 ft 4 in (1.93 m)
- Listed weight: 245 lb (111 kg)

Career information
- High school: Saline (MI)
- College: Michigan State (2012–2015)
- NFL draft: 2016: undrafted

Career history
- Green Bay Packers (2017); Baltimore Ravens (2017); Green Bay Packers (2017); New York Giants (2019); Miami Dolphins (2019); San Francisco 49ers (2020–2024); Miami Dolphins (2026)*
- * Offseason or practice squad member only

Career NFL statistics as of 2024
- Games played: 100
- Total tackles: 2
- Stats at Pro Football Reference

Taybor Pepper (born May 28, 1994) is an American professional football long snapper. He played college football for the Michigan State Spartans.

== College career ==
Pepper attended Michigan State University where he served as starting long snapper all four years from 2012 to 2016, playing a total 54 career games. In 2015, analyst Phil Steele named Pepper to the preseason second All-America team.

== Professional career ==
Pre-draft measurables
Height	Weight	Arm length	Hand span	40-yard dash	10-yard split	20-yard split	Vertical jump	Broad jump	Bench press
6 ft 4 1/4 in (1.94 m)	238 lb (108 kg)	31 7/8 in (0.81 m)	9 3/8 in (0.24 m)	5.12 s	1.84 s	2.97 s	32.0 in (0.81 m)	9 ft 6 in (2.90 m)	15 reps
All values from Pro Day

=== Green Bay Packers (first stint) ===
After going undrafted in the 2016 NFL draft, Pepper was not signed by a team during the 2016 season. On January 27, 2017, he signed a reserve/futures contract with the Green Bay Packers.

=== Baltimore Ravens ===
On August 28, 2017, Pepper signed with the Baltimore Ravens, but was waived four days later.

=== Green Bay Packers (second stint) ===
On September 25, 2017, Pepper resigned with the Packers to replace an injured Brett Goode. On November 3, he was placed on injured reserve after suffering a broken foot in practice.

=== New York Giants ===
On January 2, 2019, Pepper signed a reserve/future contract with the New York Giants. He was waived by the Giants on August 31.

=== Miami Dolphins ===
On September 2, 2019, Pepper signed with the Miami Dolphins. He was waived by the Dolphins on April 26, 2020.

=== San Francisco 49ers ===
On September 30, 2020, Pepper signed with the San Francisco 49ers. He was placed on the reserve/COVID-19 list by the team on December 28, and activated on February 2, 2021. On February 4, Pepper signed a two-year contract extension with the 49ers.

On February 25, 2023, Pepper signed a three-year contract extension with the 49ers.

On March 13, 2025, Pepper was released by the 49ers, after the team signed Jon Weeks.

=== Miami Dolphins (second stint) ===
On March 19, 2026, Pepper signed with the Miami Dolphins after being unsigned by a team in 2025. He was released by the Dolphins on May 4.
