= Paul McPharlin =

Paul McPharlin (1903–1948) was a puppeteer who created some twenty productions in Detroit between 1928 and 1937. He is remembered as a skillful performer and inventive puppet maker. He is a founding member of the Puppeteers of America. In 1929, McPharlin established the Marionette Fellowship of Detroit. In 1933, he organized an important puppetry exhibit for the Century of Progress in Chicago. He was the husband and close collaborator of the puppeteer Marjorie Batchelder McPharlin.

A collection of his work is on permanent display at the Detroit Institute of Art. A collection of his papers and books is at the University of New Mexico.

McPharlin also had an interest in the history of books and typography, and wrote the 1942 book, Roman numerals, typographic leaves and pointing hands : some notes on their origin, history, and contemporary use, a study of the history of Roman numerals, fleurons, and manicules. He was a friend and contemporary of William Addison Dwiggins, who shared his dual interests in typography and puppetry.
