= Gregory, Michigan =

- Unincorporated community
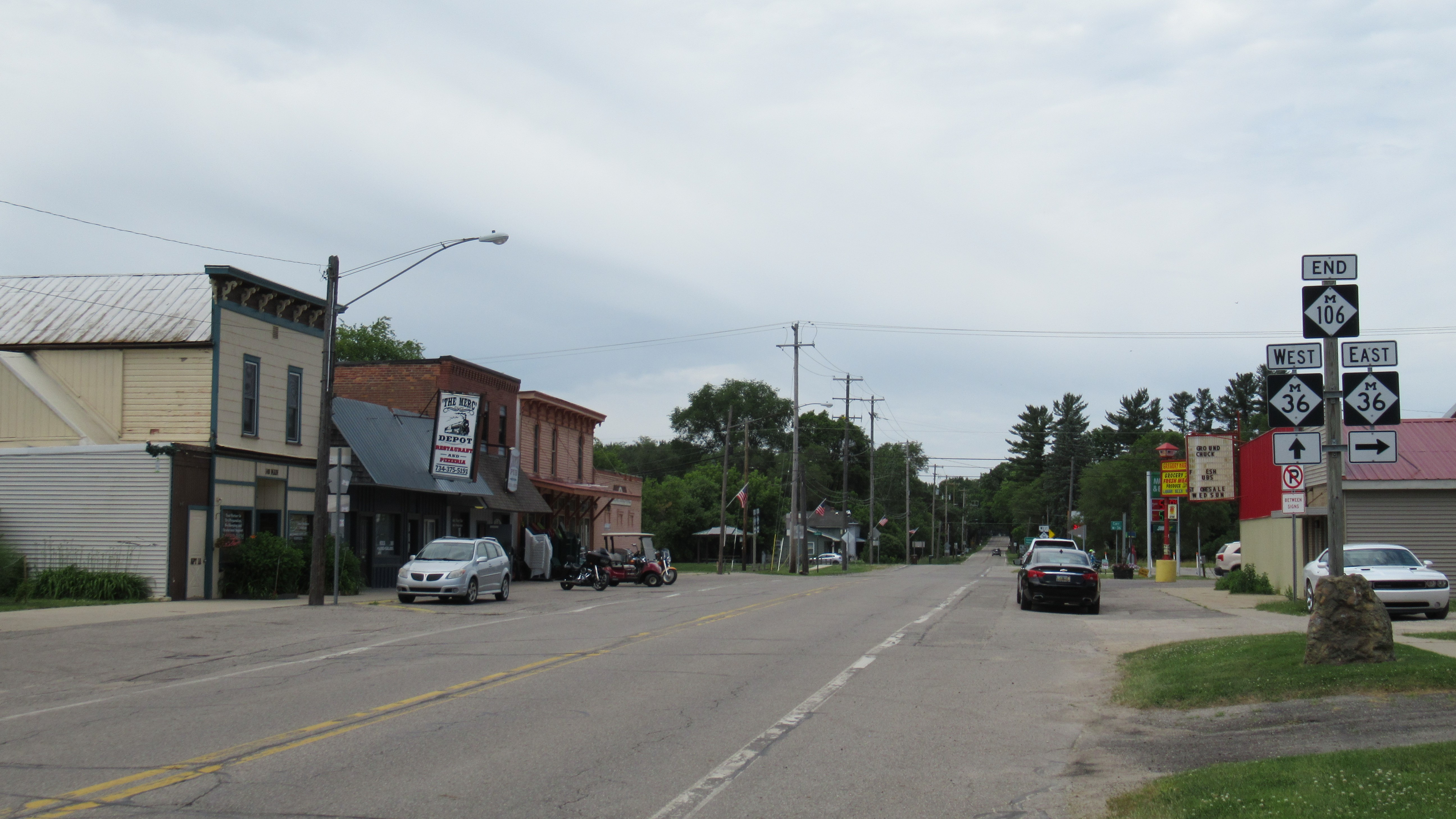
- Looking north at the M-106 terminus at M-36

- Location within the state of Michigan Location within the United States
- Coordinates: 42°27′30″N 84°05′04″W
- Country: United States
- State: Michigan
- County: Livingston
- Township: Unadilla
- Established: 1884
- Elevation: 935 ft (285 m)
- Time zone: UTC-5 (Eastern (EST))
  - Summer (DST): UTC-4 (EDT)
- ZIP code(s): 48137
- Area code: 734
- GNIS feature ID: 627403

Gregory is an unincorporated community in Livingston County in the U.S. state of Michigan. The community is located within Unadilla Township. As an unincorporated community, Gregory has no legally defined boundaries or population statistics of its own but does have its own post office with the 48137 ZIP Code.

== Geography ==
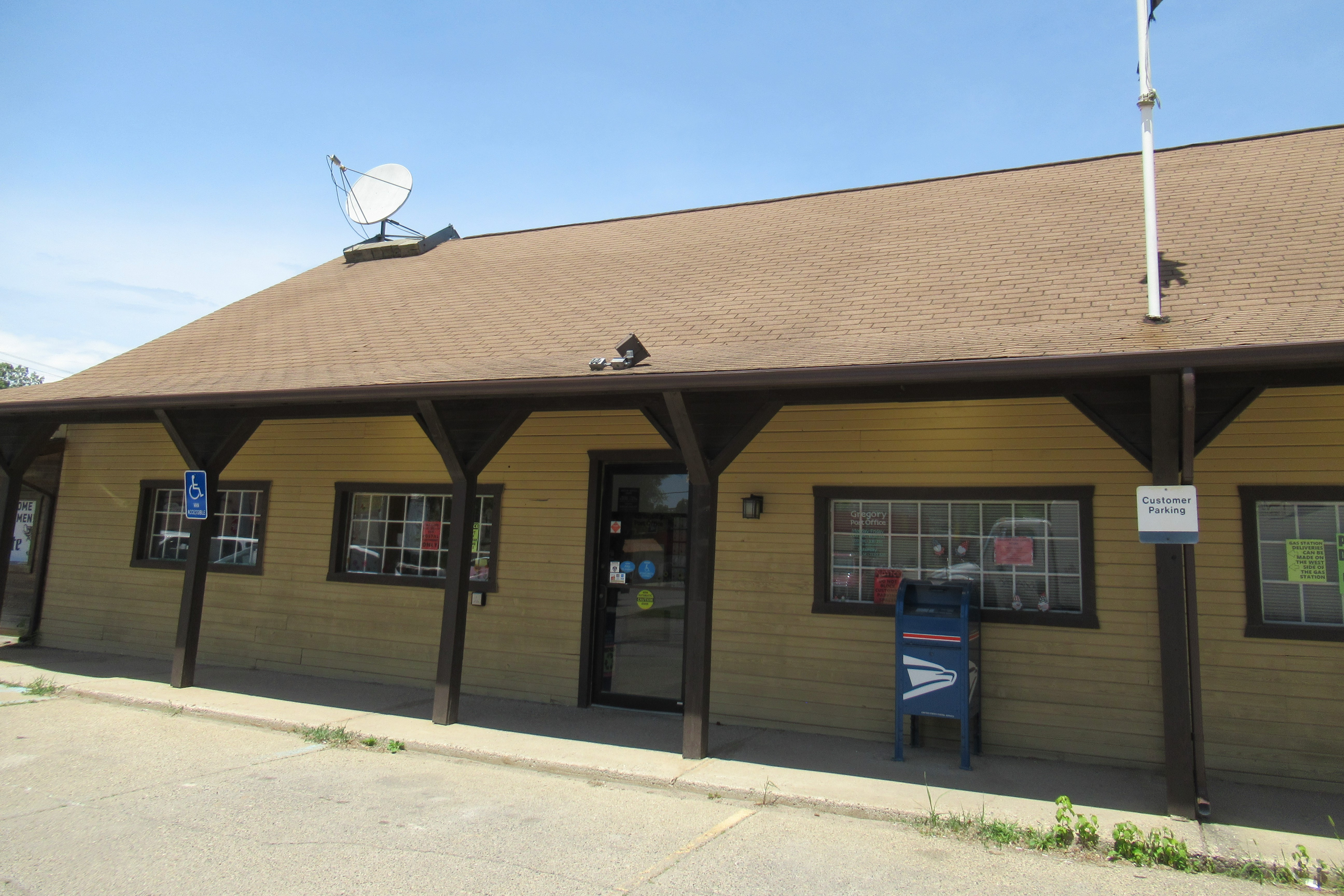
U.S. Post Office in Gregory

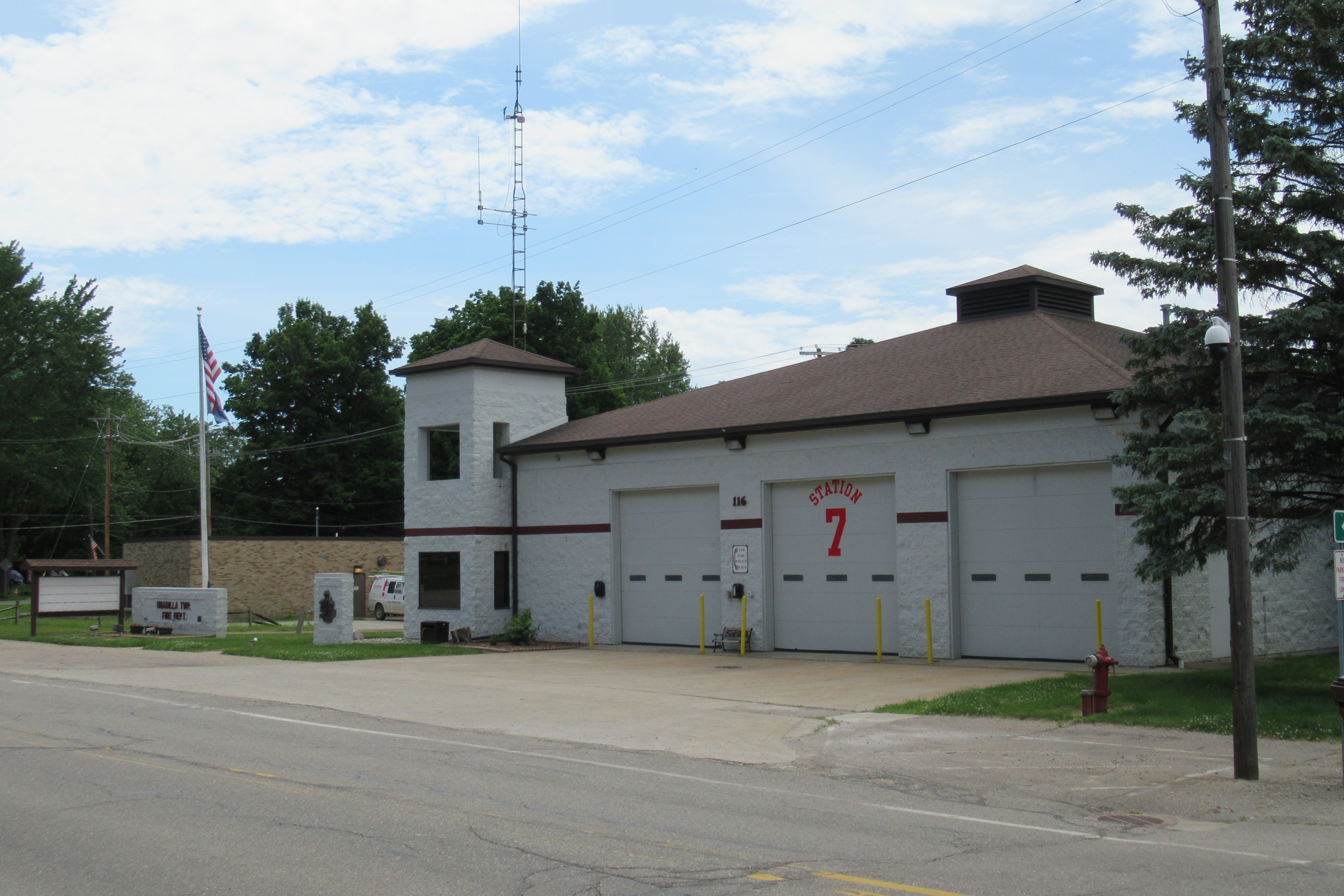
Unadilla Township Fire Department

Gregory is located within central Unadilla Township in southwest Livingston County. The community is located about 20 miles (32 km) southwest of the Brighton–Howell area. It is one of the westernmost communities included in the Detroit–Warren–Dearborn Metropolitan Statistical Area (Metro Detroit). Gregory sits at an elevation of 935 feet (285 m) above sea level.

The community is centered along the northern terminus of M-106 (Main Street) at a curve along M-36. County highway D-32 (Church Street) also begins in Gregory at M-106 and runs for 8.4 miles (13.5 km) until merging into county highway D-19 near Pinckney. These are the only two county-designated highways in southeast Michigan. Other nearby communities include the unincorporated communities of Williamsville and Unadilla to the south, as well as Hell to the southeast. The village of Stockbridge is to the west in Ingham County, and the village of Pinckney is to the east. Richmond Field is a small general aviation airport located about 2.0 miles (3.2 km) southeast of the center of the community.

Lakelands Trail State Park has a trailhead and passes through Gregory, which crosses M-36 in the center of the community at 188 Main Street. Gregory State Game Area is located just northeast of the community. The state game area occupies 2,705 acres (10.95 km^{2}) of land within Unadilla Township and Putnam Township to the east. Unadilla State Wildlife Area is just to the southwest of the community. This wildlife area encompasses 1,163 acres (4.71 km^{2}) of land mostly in Unadilla Township with a small portion extending south into Lyndon Township in Washtenaw County.

Gregory contains its own post office that uses the 48137 ZIP Code. The post office serves a larger area that includes most of Unadilla Township, as well as a small portion of southern Iosco Township. The ZIP Code extends to the south in Washtenaw County and serves northern portions of Dexter Township and Lyndon Township. The Unadilla Township Offices and Police Department are located within the center of Gregory at 126 Webb Street. The Unadilla Township Fire Department is also headquartered in Gregory at 116 Main Street. The community is served by Stockbridge Community Schools to the west in Stockbridge.

== History ==
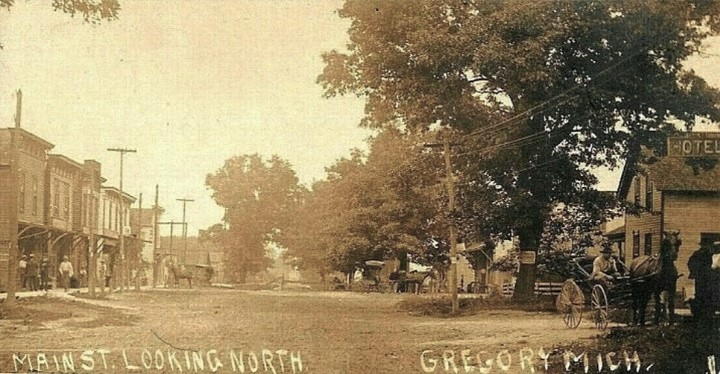
Historic image of Main Street in 1906

The area was originally settled and occupied by the Halstead Gregory farmstead in Unadilla Township in 1884. At the same time, a Jackson branch Grand Trunk Railroad line came through the area and established a depot, which connected from Jackson in the southwest to Pinckney in the northeast. A post office first opened on March 14, 1884 with Halstead Gregory serving as the first postmaster. He also built a general store near the train depot. The post office has remained in operation ever since and is currently located at 114 East M-36 in the center of the community.

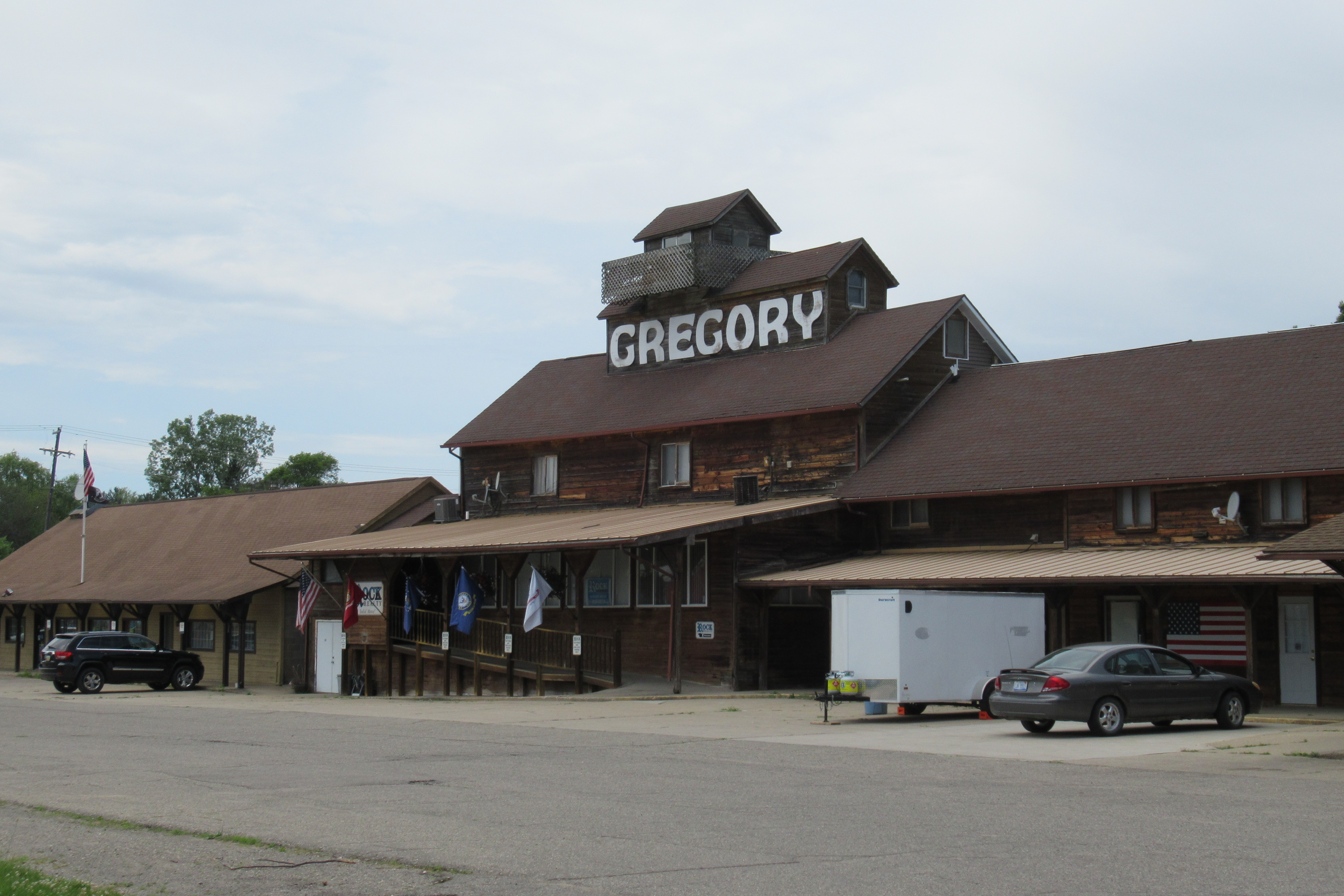
Former train depot in 2022

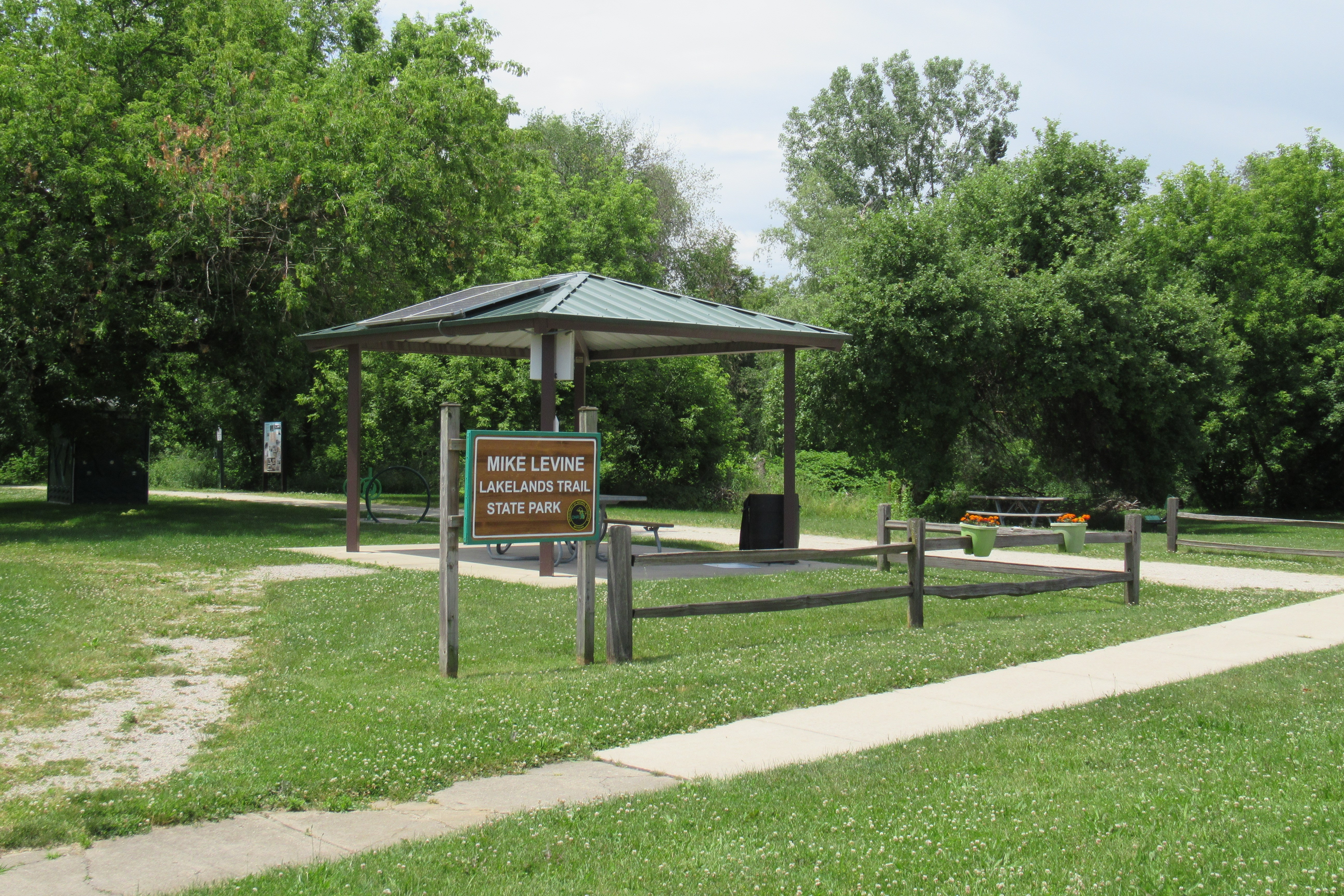
Lakelands Trail trailhead in Gregory

Among the oldest businesses in Gregory, Howlett Brothers Hardware opened in 1894 by Fred and T. Henry Howlett after purchasing tracts of land from the Halstead Gregory farmstead. The store itself was actually first constructed in 1864 and moved from nearby Unadilla about 3.0 miles (4.8 km) away. The business originally served as a mercantile and general store, and it supplied the community with its first indoor plumbing supplies. The hardware store has undergone numerous alterations under several owners, but the front entrance and steel door of the original 1864 structure remains intact. It is currently operating under local ownership as the Bramlett Hardware Company at the same location of 164 Main Street.

The train depot was soon closed with the disestablishment of the railroad, and the railway lines were eventually removed altogether. Gregory is no longer served by railway lines. Without the railroad, Gregory benefited from the creation of several highways. By early 1931, M-106, known locally as Main Street, was extended from Stockbridge and provided a direct route to Jackson. M-36 was also rerouted to run through Gregory, with M-106 having its northern terminus at M-36 in the center of the community. In 1970, D-32 was commissioned as one of the state's first county-designated highways. Known locally as Church Street, it runs through the community of Hell and connects to Pinckney. In 1991, the pathway along the former railway line through Gregory was designated as Lakelands Trail State Park, which serves as a 22-mile-long (35 km) multi-use non-motorized trail that runs from Hamburg to Stockbridge.

There are two designated Michigan State Historic Sites within the Gregory vicinity. The First Presbyterian Church is located at 20175 Williamsville Road. The congregation dates back to 1837, and the building itself dates back to 1846, although it was destroyed by a tornado in 1914 and rebuilt. The Plainfield Methodist Church is another historic site located at 17485 East M-36. This congregation dates back to 1863. The first church was built in 1868 but burned down after being struck by lightning in 1906. The current church was constructed in 1907. Established in 1837, the Unadilla Baseline Cemetery is a county-designated historic site located to the southeast of Gregory. Judson Dwight Collins was buried here after he died in 1852. Other graves date back to the Civil War period, although many of the earliest grave locations are unknown after the 1914 tornado.

== Notable people ==
- Gregg Hartsuff, head coach of the rowing team at the University of Michigan, born in Gregory
- T. Henry Howlett, state politician who died in the Kerns Hotel fire, original owner of the Howlett Brothers Hardware in Gregory
