= M-52 (Michigan highway) =

State highway in Michigan, United States

M-52
- M-52 highlighted in red

Route information
- Maintained by MDOT
- Length: 127.300 mi (204.869 km)
- Existed: c. July 1, 1919–present

Major junctions
- South end: SR 109 at Ohio state line
- US 223 in Adrian; M-50 near Tecumseh; US 12 near Clinton; I-94 in Chelsea; I-96 in Webberville; I-69 in Perry
- North end: M-46 near Saginaw

Location
- Country: United States
- State: Michigan
- Counties: Lenawee, Washtenaw, Jackson, Ingham, Shiawassee, Saginaw

Highway system
- Michigan State Trunkline Highway System; Interstate; US; State; Byways
← M-51	→ M-53
← M-91	M-92	→ M-93

M-52 is a north–south state trunkline highway in the US state of Michigan. The southern terminus is on the Ohio border, where it continues as State Route 109 (SR 109). The highway passes through communities like Adrian, where it intersects US Highway 223 (US 223), Chelsea and Webberville along its 127.3-mile-long (204.9 km) course. It crosses some major rivers, including the River Raisin and the Shiawassee. The section of the highway between M-50 and Manchester was built as a limited-access highway. M-52's northern terminus is at M-46, nine miles (14 km) west of Saginaw.

Adrian previously converted their downtown streets to one-way traffic between 1950 and 1973. The traffic pattern created an unusual arrangement in the routings of the two state highways downtown. Southbound M-52 followed Winter Street, which also carried both eastbound and westbound directions of the US 223 business loop. These streets carried both highways around the downtown business district in this arrangement until November 2009.

M-52 is an original state trunkline highway, dating to the 1919 formation of the system. Other segments of the modern routing were designated M-92 and M-47 at the time. Extensions to M-52 supplanted M-92 completely and M-47 partially along their routings. These extensions completed the modern M-52 routing in the late 1960s.

== Route description ==
M-52 starts at the Ohio state line as Adrian Highway in Fairfield Township, Lenawee County, where it is the continuation of SR 109 into Michigan. The highway runs north to Adrian where it intersects US Highway 223 (US 223) at the city border with Madison Township. As the highway crosses the city line, it is concurrently designated Business US 223 (Bus. US 223) along Main Street into downtown Adrian. Bus. US 223/M-52 intersects Beecher Street, which carries M-34 to the latter's eastern terminus in Adrian. After Beecher, Main Street turns north-northeast into the downtown area.

In downtown Adrian, M-52 runs north along Main Street to Church Street. Since November 2009, the one-way streets were converted back to two-way functionality. Both directions of M-52 now turn east along Church, then north along Broad Street. At Front Street, traffic is diverted west back to Main Street. Continuing north out of downtown Adrian, M-52 follows Main Street over the South Branch of the River Raisin and out of the city limits, where it once again becomes Adrian Highway. The highway curves from running north-northeast back to due north. West of the city of Tecumseh, the trunkline intersects M-50. M-52 continues north as a limited-access highway. Access to and from the highway is limited to select cross roads only. Just south of the county line, the highway intersects with US 12 before crossing into Washtenaw County.

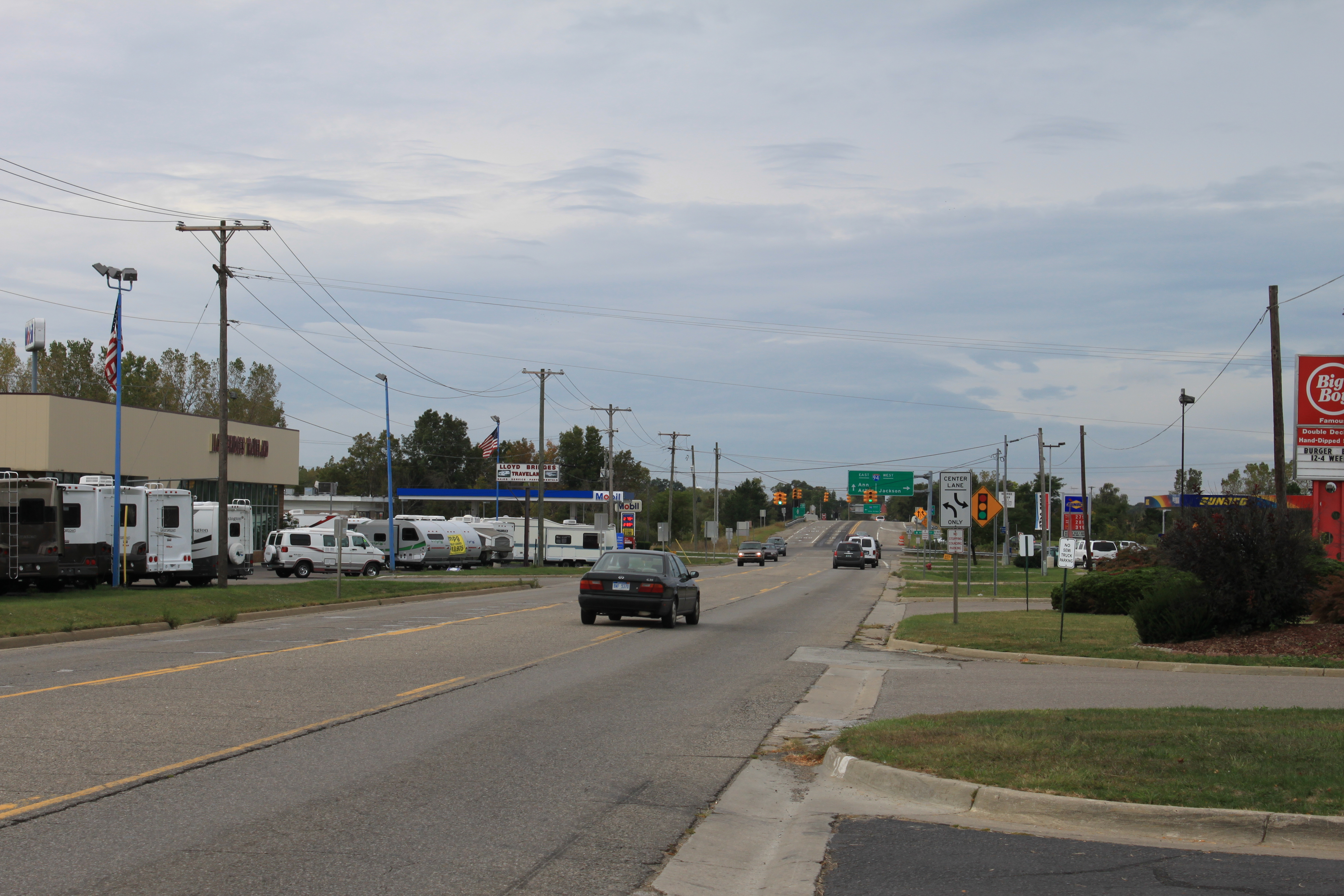
M-52 north of I-94 intersection, Chelsea

The limited-access section of M-52 continues north through western Washtenaw County, where it ends in Manchester. M-52 turns west along Austin and City roads into the village. The trunkline continues along the banks of the north branch of the River Raisin on Riverside Drive before turning north out of town. Just south of Chelsea, M-52 crosses Interstate 94 (I-94). The highway continues through downtown Chelsea and turns northwesterly through the Waterloo State Recreation Area in the northwesternmost part of the county. The highway clips the corner of Jackson County, running for almost 2.5 miles (4.0 km) through Waterloo Township before crossing into Ingham County south of Stockbridge.

M-52 joins M-106 south of Stockbridge, and the two highways run together into the village. In downtown, M-106 turns east and M-52 turns west before heading north out of town. At the Stockbridge–White Oak township line, M-52 joins M-36 which follows the townships' common border. The two highways run concurrently north into White Oak Township before M-36 turns west, ending the concurrency. In western Webberville, M-52 passes under I-96 and merges with M-43 at the latter's eastern terminus. The two highways run north to, and turn west along, Grand River Avenue. At Perry Road, M-52 turns back north out of the village. The trunkline continues north into Shiawassee County and runs through Perry before crossing I-69. Continuing north, M-52 curves northeasterly into downtown Owosso intersecting M-21 west of M-71's western terminus. M-52 continues northward parallel to the Shiawassee River into Saginaw County.

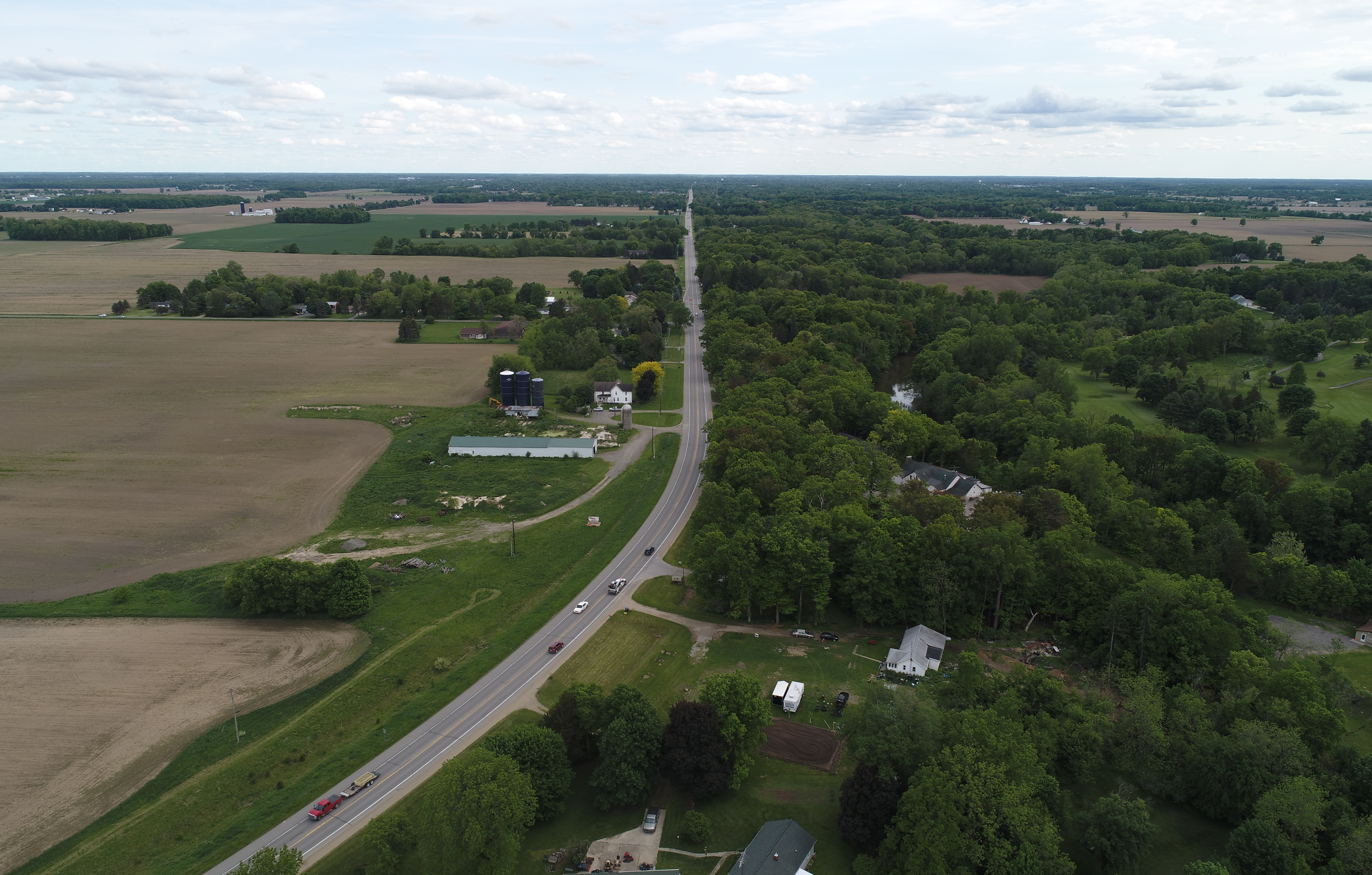
M-52 north of Owosso, looking south

The trunkline runs through the community of Oakley before intersecting M-57 west of Chesaning. North of Chesaning, M-52 angles to the northeast into and through St. Charles, crossing the Shiawassee River west of the Shiawassee National Wildlife Refuge. The northern terminus of M-52 is an intersection with M-46 west of Saginaw in Thomas Township.

== History ==
M-92
- Location: Franklin Township–Stockbridge Township
- Length: 36.639 mi (58.965 km)
- Existed: c. July 1, 1919–1962

M-52 was first designated by July 1, 1919. The original routing started at the Ohio state line and ran north through Adrian to M-50 much as it does today. It turned east along M-50 into Tecumseh and then turned north to Clinton where it terminated. The remainder of the modern highway routing is either not part of the state trunkline system, or it is parts of other highways at this time, M-92 or M-47. In 1954, M-92 was extended southward to end in Clinton at the same intersection with US 112 where M-52 terminated. By July 1, 1960, M-92's southern end was shifted westward, terminating west of Clinton at US 112 on a new roadway south of Manchester. M-52 was extended around 1962 north between M-50 and US 12 (the former US 112) west of Tecumseh and Clinton. This extension ended at M-92's terminus with US 12. M-52 was then extended north supplanting the M-92 designation in its entirety. M-52 at this time runs north from the Ohio state line to Millville in southwestern Ingham County. In the late 1960s, Stockbridge Road between Webberville and Stockbridge was upgraded to state highway standards and uploaded from the county to the state. This construction was shown on the 1969 state map. When it was completed later that year, M-52 was extended northward a second time, to I-96 outside of Webberville. Where Stockbridge Road crossed I-96, M-52 was continued north, supplanting M-47 through Webberville and north to the junction with M-46 west of Saginaw. This designation change shortened M-47 to its current southern terminus in Saginaw Township.

The previous highway assignments on the one-way streets in Downtown Adrian

In downtown Adrian, the highways previously split into an uncommon arrangement of one-way streets. This arrangement was similar to a traffic circle in how the traffic was routed through the central business district on Church, Broad, Front and Winter streets. The first one-way pairing started on Main Street at the intersection with Winter Street. Northbound traffic continued on Main Street, while southbound traffic was routed along Winter Street. At Church Street, westbound Bus. US 223/northbound M-52 turned east for a block on Church and then north onto Broad Street. Then the highway designations continued on Broad Street three blocks north to Front Street, passing to the east of the downtown businesses. The designations were then routed west along Front Street. At Main Street, M-52 turned back north again as a two-way street. In the opposite direction, southbound M-52 traffic was diverted from Main west on Front Street. Front Street west of Main Street carried southbound M-52 and westbound Bus. US 223 traffic one block west to Winter Street, which then turned down Winter. Westbound Bus. US 223 traffic turned west along Maumee Street while eastbound Bus. US 223 followed southbound M-52 down Winter to Main Street. This arrangement was ended in November 2009 when the City of Adrian converted all of the one-way streets to two-way traffic. Downtown streets had been converted to one-way traffic between 1950 and 1973.

== Major intersections ==
County	Location	mi	km	Destinations	Notes
Lenawee	Fairfield Township	0.000	0.000	SR 109 south – Delta	Ohio state line
Lenawee	Madison Township–Adrian city line	10.959	17.637	US 223 – Jackson, Toledo Bus. US 223 north	Southern end of Bus.US 223 concurrency on the Adrian city line
Lenawee	Adrian	11.963	19.253	M-34 west – Hillsdale	Eastern terminus of M-34
Lenawee	Adrian	12.501	20.118	Bus. US 223 north	Northern end of Bus. US 223 concurrency
Lenawee	Tecumseh Township	21.231	34.168	M-50 – Jackson, Monroe	
Lenawee	Franklin Township	25.688	41.341	US 12 – Ypsilanti, Coldwater	
Washtenaw	Chelsea	42.429	68.283	I-94 – Detroit, Chicago	Exit 159 on I-94
Jackson	No major junctions				
Ingham	Stockbridge	57.011	91.750	M-106 south – Jackson	Southern end of M-106 concurrency
Ingham	Stockbridge	58.829	94.676	M-106 north – Gregory	Northern end of M-106 concurrency
Ingham	Stockbridge–White Oak township line	62.327	100.306	M-36 east – Pinckney, Whitmore Lake	Southern end of M-36 concurrency
Ingham	White Oak Township	65.097	104.763	M-36 west – Mason	Northern end of M-36 concurrency
Ingham	Webberville	72.350	116.436	I-96 – Lansing, Detroit M-43 west	Exit 122 on I-96; southern end of M-43 concurrency; eastern terminus of M-43
Ingham	Leroy Township	74.180	119.381	M-43 west – Lansing	Northern end of M-43 concurrency
Shiawassee	Perry	85.844	138.153	I-69 – Lansing, Flint	Exit 105 on I-69
Shiawassee	Owosso	97.606	157.082	M-21 – St. Johns, Flint	
Saginaw	Brady–Chesaning township line	110.815	178.339	M-57 – Greenville, Clio	
Saginaw	Thomas Township	127.300	204.869	M-46 – St. Louis, Saginaw	
1.000 mi = 1.609 km; 1.000 km = 0.621 mi: Concurrency terminus
