= Pinckney Community Schools =

School district in Michigan

Address
- 2130 East M36 Pinckney, Oakland, Michigan, 48169; United States

District information
- Type: Public
- Grades: PreK–12
- Superintendent: Rick Todd
- Schools: 6
- Budget: $51,085,000 operating expenditures 2022-2023
- NCES District ID: 2628140

Students and staff
- Students: 2,023 (2024–2025)
- Teachers: 113.21 (on an FTE basis) (2024-2025)
- Staff: 268.33 (on an FTE basis) (2024-2025)
- Student–teacher ratio: 17.87 (2024-2025)

Other information
- Website: www.pinckneypirates.org

Pinckney Community Schools is a public school district in Livingston County, Michigan. It serves Pinckney and parts of Hamburg Township, Marion Township, Putnam Township, and Unadilla Township. It also serves a small part of Dexter Township in Washtenaw County.

== History ==
A brick school was built in 1888 at the northwest corner of Mill and Putnam in the village of Pinckney, and the first graduating class was in 1890. The building served as the high school until 1966. Additions to the building continued to be used by the school district after the 1888 section was demolished in 1969. After serving as the Village Education Center, the building was renovated for its present use as Pinckney Community Public Library.

Pinckney High School opened in fall 1999. The architect was TMP Associates. The high school has a 2,100 student capacity to accommodate a fast increase in student population at the time. At its peak in the 2000-2001 school year, the district had 5,177 students. In the 2023-2024 school year, the district had 2,050 students and the high school had 628 students.

The present high school replaced a building at 2100 East M36, which now houses Pathfinder Middle School. That building opened in fall 1966 and was designed by the architecture firm Vander Meiden & Koteles of Grand Haven, Michigan. Extensive additions, including an auditorium, were built in 1980. It became Pathfinder School with the opening of the current high school.

Over time, the district has replaced various schools, including:

- Lakeland Elementary School - closed in 2014
- Pinckney Elementary School - closed after the 2011-12 school year
- Hamburg Elementary School - closed in 2008
- Village Education Center - closed in 2008, later Pinckney Community Public Library

Beginning with the 2022–2023 school year, Pathfinder School serves grades 6 through 8. Starting with the 2023-2024 school year, Navigator serves grades 3 through 5. Both elementary schools serve preschool to 2nd grade.

== Schools ==
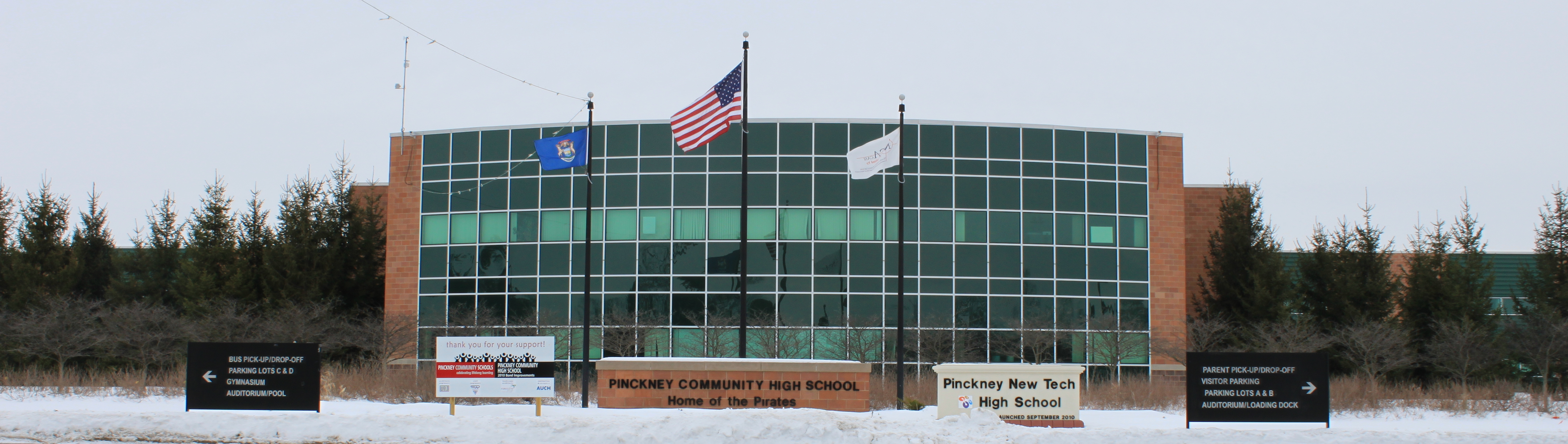
Pinckney Community High School

Schools in Pinckney Community Schools district
School	Address	Notes
Pinckney Community High School	10255 Dexter-Pinckney Road, Pinckney	Grades 9-12. Principal: Julia McBride. Assistant Principal: Daniel Ferreira. Built 1999.
The Link	2130 E. M-36, Pinckney	Alternative high school, grades 10-12. Principal: Frank A. McMurray
Pathfinder School	2100 E. M-36, Pinckney	Grades 6-8. Principal: Dr. Tami Heinonen. Dean of Students: Shawn Kelley. Formerly Pinckney High School. Built 1966.
Navigator Upper Elementary	2150 E. M-36, Pinckney	Grades 3-5. Principal: Ruth Badalucco. Dean of Students: Sandy Buczek.
Farley Hill Elementary	8110 Farley Road, Pinckney	Grades PreK-2. Principal: Danielle Birdyshaw.
Country Elementary	2939 E. M-36, Pinckney	Grades PreK-2. Principal: Kathleen Krill.
