= M-36 (Michigan highway) =

State highway in Ingham and Livingston counties in Michigan, United States

M-36
- M-36 highlighted in red

Route information
- Maintained by MDOT
- Length: 43.298 mi (69.681 km)
- Existed: 1930–present

Major junctions
- West end: US 127 at Mason
- M-52 near Millville; M-106 at Gregory
- East end: US 23 near Whitmore Lake

Location
- Country: United States
- State: Michigan
- Counties: Ingham, Livingston

Highway system
- Michigan State Trunkline Highway System; Interstate; US; State; Byways
← M-35	→ M-37

M-36 is a state trunkline highway in the Lower Peninsula of the US state of Michigan that runs in a west–east direction from Mason to Whitmore Lake. The trunkline connects US Highway 127 (US 127) south of Lansing and US 23 north of Ann Arbor. The highway connects several smaller communities in the rural areas along its route. M-36 also runs concurrently with two other roadways, sharing pavement with M-52 and County Road D-19. According to traffic surveys in 2010, between 650 and 15,300 vehicles used the highway on average each day.

The current highway to bear the M-36 moniker is the second to do so. The first was signposted in 1919 north of Pontiac until it was partially replaced by the modern M-24 in 1926. The M-36 designation was moved to the current roadway in 1930. It has been changed a few times since the highway was completely paved in 1940. The last change created the M-52 concurrency in 1969.

== Route description ==
M-36 starts at an interchange with US 127 northwest of Mason. The highway follows Cedar Street southeast and southerly from exit 66 through commercial and residential areas to Ash Street near downtown. M-36 turns eastward along Ash Street through downtown. Outside of the city, Ash Street becomes Dansville Road 1/2 mile (0.80 km) north of Mason Jewett Field, the local airport. The highway continues eastward through mixed fields and woodland. The trunkline follows Mason Street through the village of Dansville. Just south of White Oak Township Park in White Oak Township, M-36 turns south to run concurrently along M-52 through Millville. At Topping Road, M-36 turns east again north of Lowe Lake. Crossing into Livingston County where it becomes Plainfield Road, the highway then passes the Plainfield Cemetery through community of the same name and turns southeasterly toward Gregory.

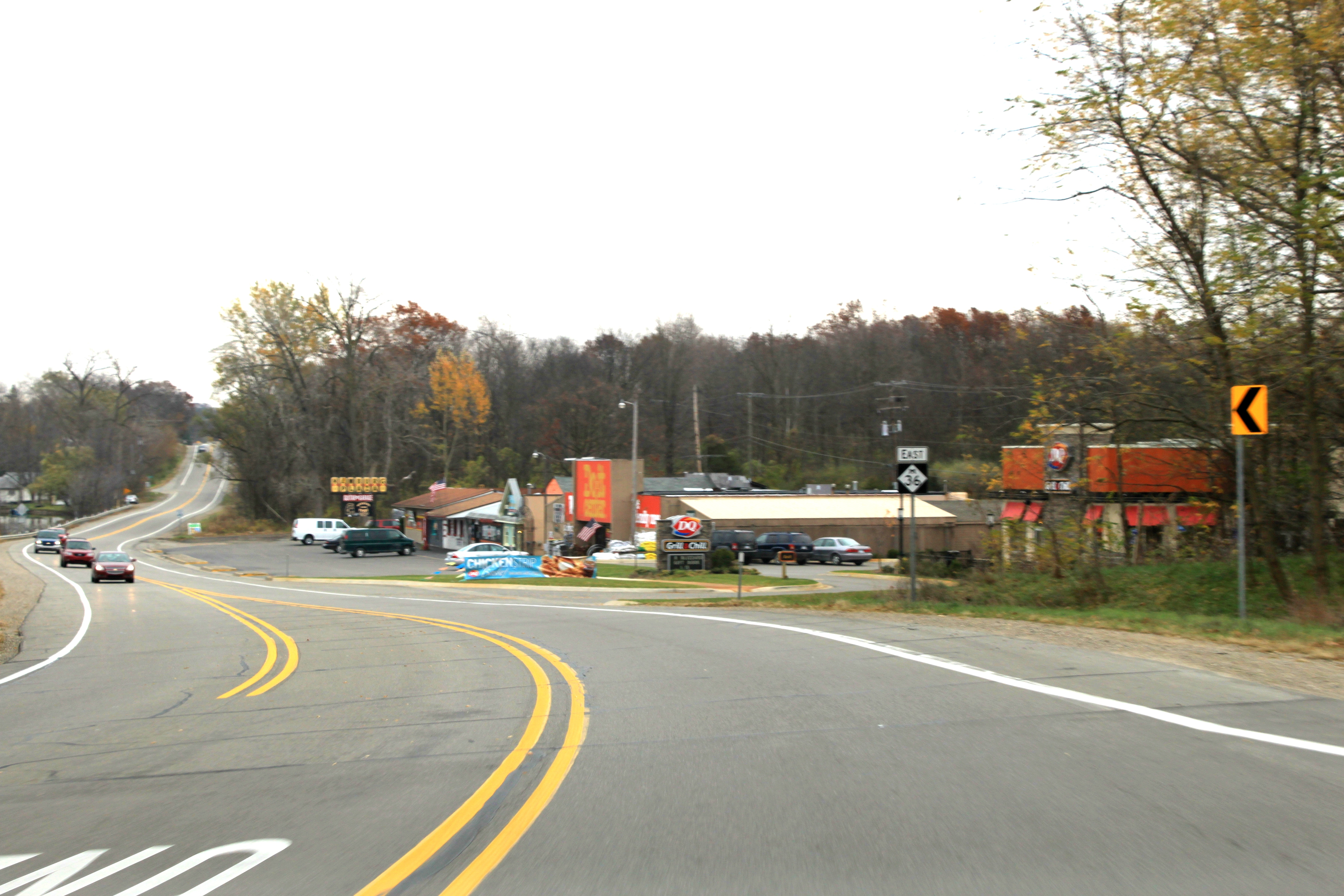
M-36 in Hamburg, facing east

North of town, M-36 turns south on Gregory Road. The highway continues as Main Street in the community to Carr Street; the highway turns back eastward on Carr Street in Gregory. As the highway runs easterly, it skirts the northern edge of the Pinckney State Recreation Area and the southern edge of the Timber Trace Golf Club. As Main Street in Pinckney, M-36 passes through the center of town. At Howell Street, County Road D-19 merges in from the south. The two designations run concurrently along Main Street to Pearl Street, where D-19 turns northward. At the intersection with Dexter Street, M-36 intersects the western terminus of D-32, the "Highway to Hell". East of Pinckney, M-36 passes between Rush and Bass lakes in the Pettysville area. Immediately east of there, the highway passes through woods between Oneida and Zukey lakes in Lakeland. The trunkline passes to the south of Buck Lake and then meanders through Hamburg southeasterly. M-36 ends as 9 Mile Road at exit 54 on US 23 in Whitmore Lake.

M-36 is maintained by the Michigan Department of Transportation (MDOT) like other state highways in Michigan. As a part of these maintenance responsibilities, the department tracks the volume of traffic that uses the roadways under its jurisdiction. These volumes are expressed using a metric called annual average daily traffic, which is a statistical calculation of the average daily number of vehicles on a segment of roadway. MDOT's surveys in 2010 showed that the highest traffic levels along M-36 were the 15,226 vehicles daily in Mason; the lowest count was 657 vehicles per day east of the M-52 concurrency. No section of M-36 has been listed on the National Highway System, a network of roads important to the country's economy, defense, and mobility.

== History ==
=== Original designation ===
On July 1, 1919, M-36 was routed along what is now M-24 between Pontiac and Burnside. In November 1926, this highway was redesignated as part of M-24 between Pontiac and Lapeer. In 1930, the remainder was turned back to local control and removed from the state highway system.

=== Current designation ===
M-36 supplanted the former M-49 designation between Mason and Whitmore Lake in late 1930; segments of M-49 through Stockbridge not used in the new M-36 were given to M-92 or M-106. The last segments were paved in late 1940 between Plainfield and the eastern terminus. When the Michigan State Highway Department completed a US 127 bypass around Mason in late 1946 or early 1947, M-36 was extended westward over a section of highway previously used by US 127 to connect to the bypass; that segment was designated Bus. US 127/M-36 This concurrency was removed in 1962 when the Bus. US 127 designation was decommissioned. The M-52 concurrency was formed in 1969 when M-52 was extended northerly to Webberville.

== Major intersections ==
County	Location	mi	km	Destinations	Notes
Ingham	Mason	0.000	0.000	US 127 – Lansing, Jackson	Western terminus at exit 66 on US 127
Ingham	White Oak Township	15.081	24.271	M-52 north – Webberville	Northern end of M-52 concurrency
Ingham	White Oak–Stockbridge township line	17.851	28.728	M-52 south – Chelsea	Southern end of M-52 concurrency
Livingston	Gregory	25.334	40.771	M-106 south – Jackson	Northern terminus of M-106
Livingston	Pinckney	33.005	53.116	D-19 south (Howell Street)	Western end of D-19 concurrency
Livingston	Pinckney	33.250	53.511	D-19 north (Pearl Street) – Howell	Eastern end of D-19 concurrency
Livingston	Pinckney	33.497	53.908	D-32 west (Dexter Street) – Hell	Eastern terminus of D-32
Livingston	Whitmore Lake	43.298	69.681	US 23 – Flint, Ann Arbor	Eastern terminus at exit 54 on US 23
1.000 mi = 1.609 km; 1.000 km = 0.621 mi: Concurrency terminus
