= M-106 (Michigan highway) =

State highway in Michigan, United States

M-106
- M-106 highlighted in red

Route information
- Maintained by MDOT
- Length: 27.041 mi (43.518 km)
- Existed: 1928–present

Major junctions
- South end: BL I-94 / Bus. US 127 / M-50 in Jackson
- I-94 / US 127 near Jackson; M-52 in Stockbridge
- North end: M-36 in Gregory

Location
- Country: United States
- State: Michigan
- Counties: Jackson, Ingham, Livingston

Highway system
- Michigan State Trunkline Highway System; Interstate; US; State; Byways
← M-105	→ M-107

M-106 is a state trunkline highway in the Lower Peninsula of the US state of Michigan in and near the city of Jackson. M-106 travels in a southwest-to-northeast direction from Jackson to Gregory at a junction with M-36 just a few miles northwest of Hell. The highway was first designated in 1928 running north out of downtown Jackson. It connected U.S. Highway 12 (US 12) to the state prison and Bunkerhill Road. A pair of changes in the early 1930s resulted in the extension eastward to Gregory. From the 1960s until the early years of the 21st century, a section of M-106 in downtown Jackson was routed along one-way streets.

== Route description ==
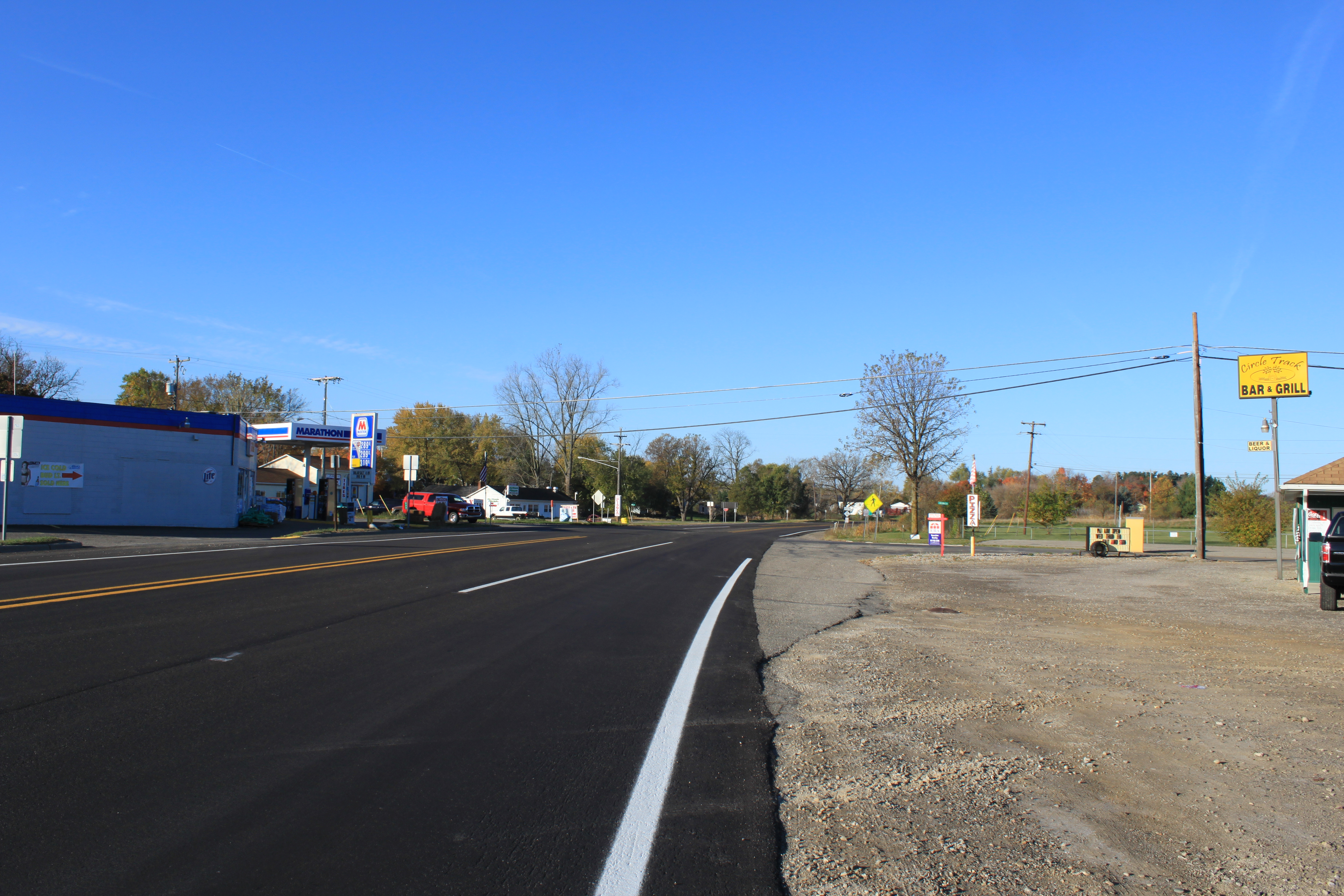
Intersection of M-106 (Plum Orchard Road) and Musbach Road, the boundary between Henrietta and Waterloo townships

M-106 starts in downtown Jackson at the corner of Cooper Street and Michigan Avenue. Michigan Avenue runs east–west carrying Business Loop Interstate 94 (BL I-94), Business US 127 (Bus. US 127) and M-50, and Cooper Street runs northwesterly from here carrying M-106. The highway passes through residential neighborhoods immediately north of downtown, and turns due north near Jackson Catholic Middle School and the historic Michigan State Prison. Continuing a few miles north through an interchange with I-94 and US 127, M-106 runs north out of town. Cooper Street continues out of town, and the trunkline runs by the State Prison of Southern Michigan.

North of the current prison, the highway curves to the northwest following Bunkerhill Road. Through this area, M-106 runs through farm fields and forests. The highway turns onto Plum Orchard Road near Batteese Lake and runs east into the community of Munith. M-106 merges onto Territorial Road east of the town before crossing the county line into Ingham County. South of Stockbridge, M-106 merges with M-52 and the two run concurrently into that community. M-106 turns east in the downtown area and continues along Morton Road into Livingston County. The highway ends at a junction with M-36 in Gregory.

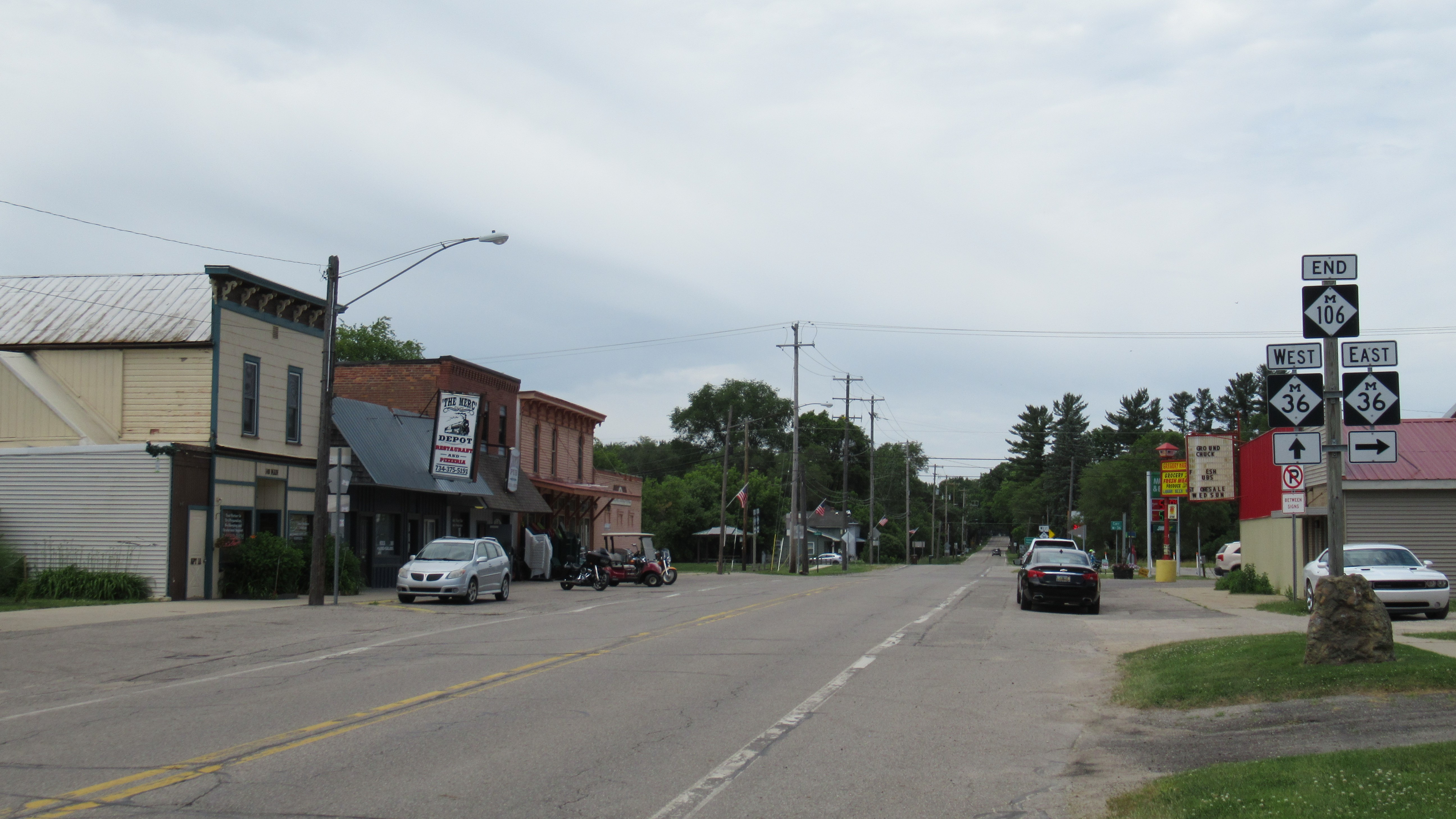
Northern terminus of M-106 at M-36 in Unadilla Township

M-106 is maintained by MDOT like other state highways in Michigan. As a part of these maintenance responsibilities, the department tracks the volume of traffic that uses the roadways under its jurisdiction. These volumes are expressed using a metric called annual average daily traffic, which is a statistical calculation of the average daily number of vehicles on a segment of roadway. MDOT's surveys in 2010 showed that the highest traffic levels along M-106 were the 15,474 vehicles daily south of I-94; the lowest counts were the 1,550 vehicles per day in near the M-36 junction. The only section of M-106 has been listed on the National Highway System (NHS) is between M-50 and I-94 in Jackson. The NHS is a network of roads important to the country's economy, defense, and mobility.

== History ==
M-106 was first designated in 1928 on a route that ran from US 12 (Michigan Avenue) along Cooper Street to Bunkerhill Road, a total of 4 1/2 miles (7.2 km). This highway was extended north to Stockbridge in late 1930 or early 1931. A further realignment of M-36 resulted in the extension of M-106 to Gregory. Cooper Street in Jackson was converted to one-way, southbound traffic in 1967. A northbound routing along Milwaukee Street was established. The south end of southbound M-106 was trimmed back to end at BL I-94/Bus. US 127/M-50. Two-way traffic was restored in 2004. M-106 was shifted to run only along Cooper Street (formerly Milwaukee Street), and Francis Street (formerly Cooper Street) is left as an unsigned trunkline.

== Major intersections ==
County	Location	mi	km	Destinations	Notes
Jackson	Jackson	0.000	0.000	BL I-94 / Bus. US 127 / M-50 (Michigan Avenue)	
Jackson	Blackman Township	1.638– 1.645	2.636– 2.647	I-94 / US 127 – Chicago, Detroit, Lansing	Exit 139 on I-94/US 127
Ingham	Stockbridge	20.620	33.185	M-52 south – Adrian	Southern end of M-52 concurrency
Ingham	Stockbridge	21.438	34.501	M-52 north – Owosso	Northern end of M-52 concurrency
Livingston	Unadilla Township	26.925	43.332	D-32 east – Hell	Western terminus of D-32
Livingston	Gregory	27.041	43.518	M-36 – Mason, Pinckney	
1.000 mi = 1.609 km; 1.000 km = 0.621 mi: Concurrency terminus
