= Unadilla Township, Michigan =

- Civil township
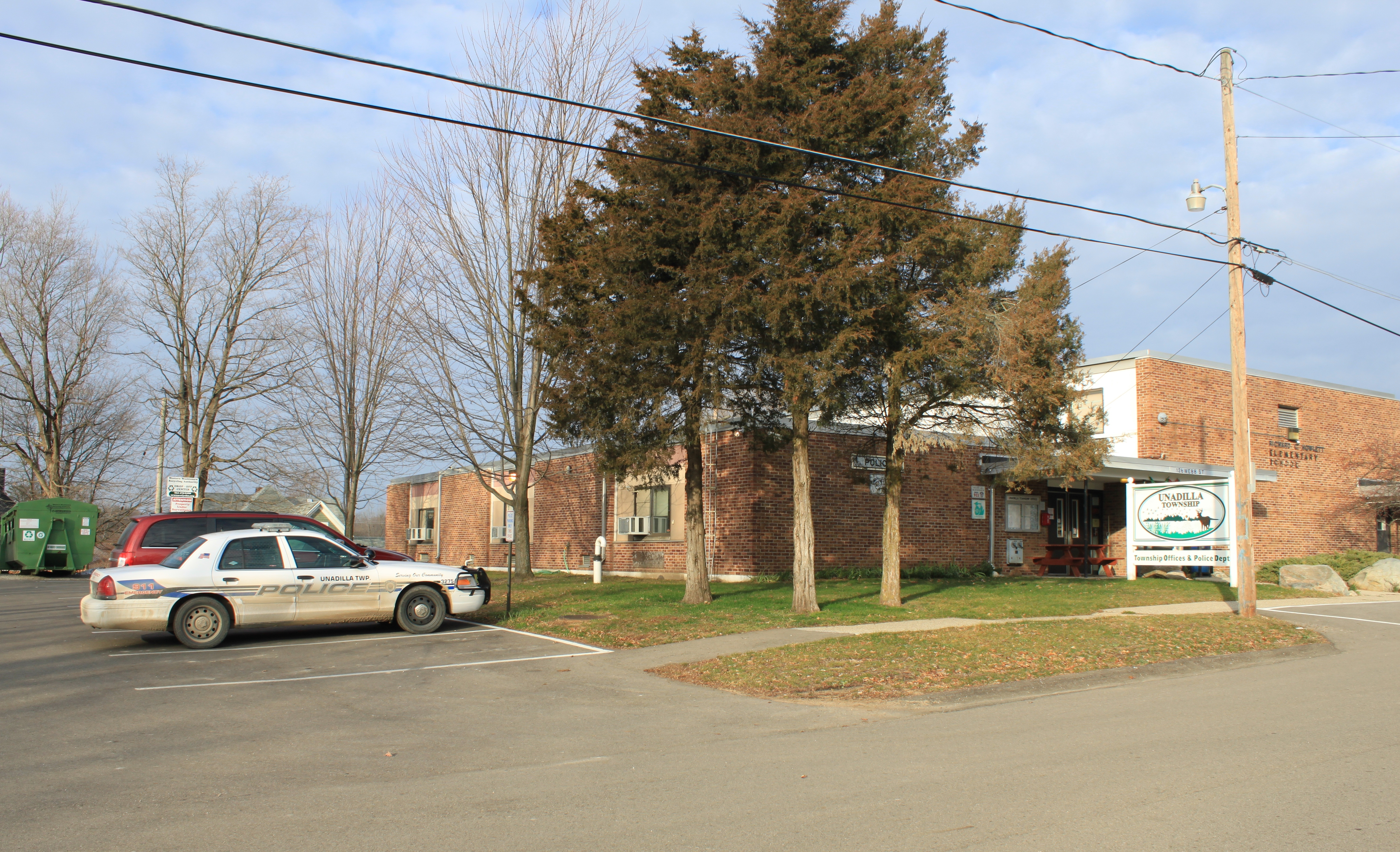
- Unadilla Township Offices and Police Department

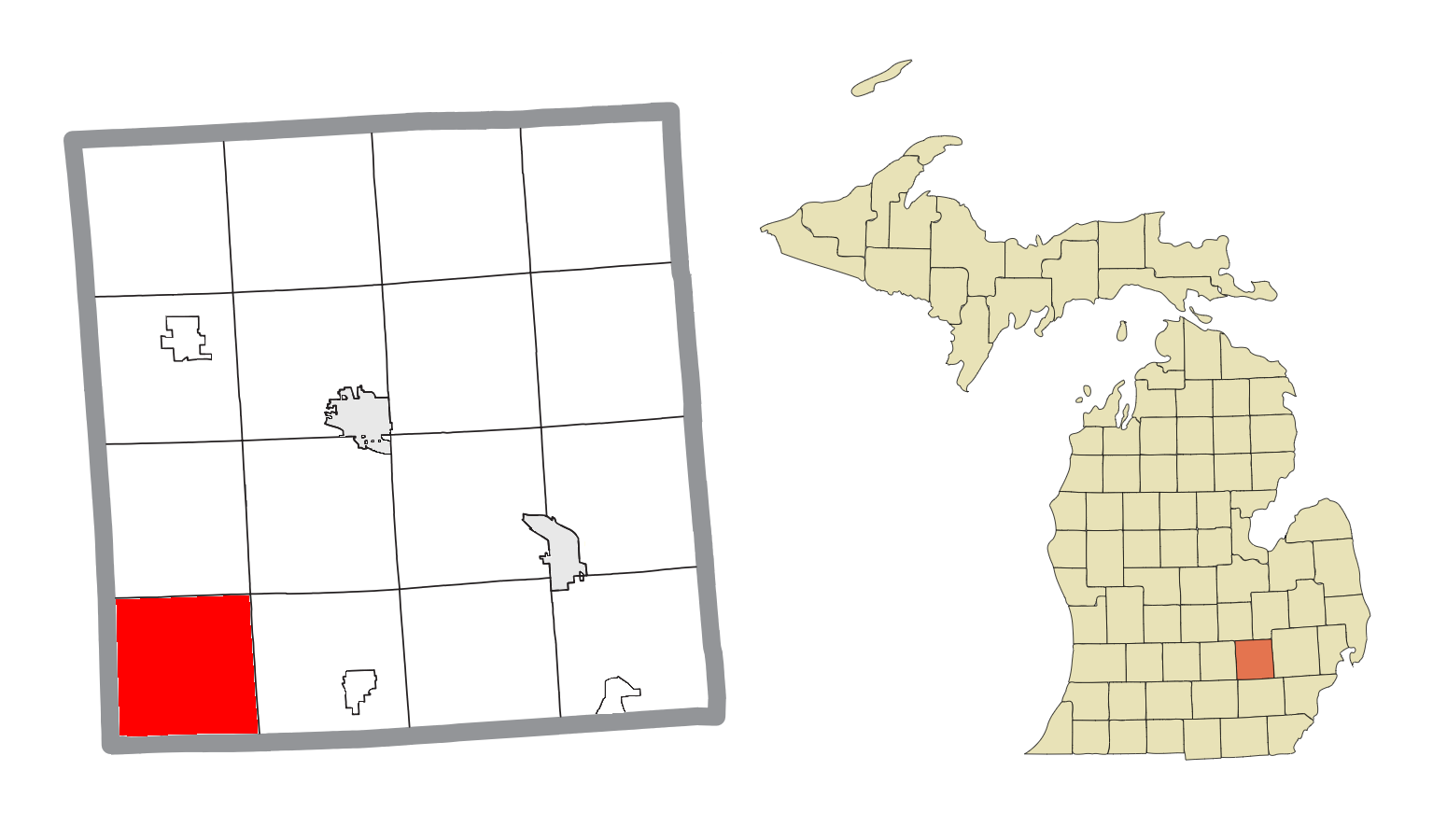
- Location within Livingston County

- Location in Michigan Location in the United States
- Coordinates: 42°27′38″N 84°04′15″W
- Country: United States
- State: Michigan
- County: Livingston
- Established: 1835

Government
  - Supervisor: Linda Walker
  - Clerk: Linda Topping

Area
  - Total: 34.7 sq mi (89.9 km^{2})
  - Land: 33.8 sq mi (87.5 km^{2})
  - Water: 0.93 sq mi (2.4 km^{2})
- Elevation: 961 ft (293 m)

Population (2020)
  - Total: 3,333
  - Density: 98.7/sq mi (38.1/km^{2})
- Time zone: UTC-5 (Eastern (EST))
  - Summer (DST): UTC-4 (EDT)
- ZIP code(s): 48137 (Gregory); 48169 (Pinckney); 48843 (Howell); 49285 (Stockbridge)
- Area code: 734
- FIPS code: 26-81240
- GNIS feature ID: 1627183
- Website: twp.unadilla.mi.us

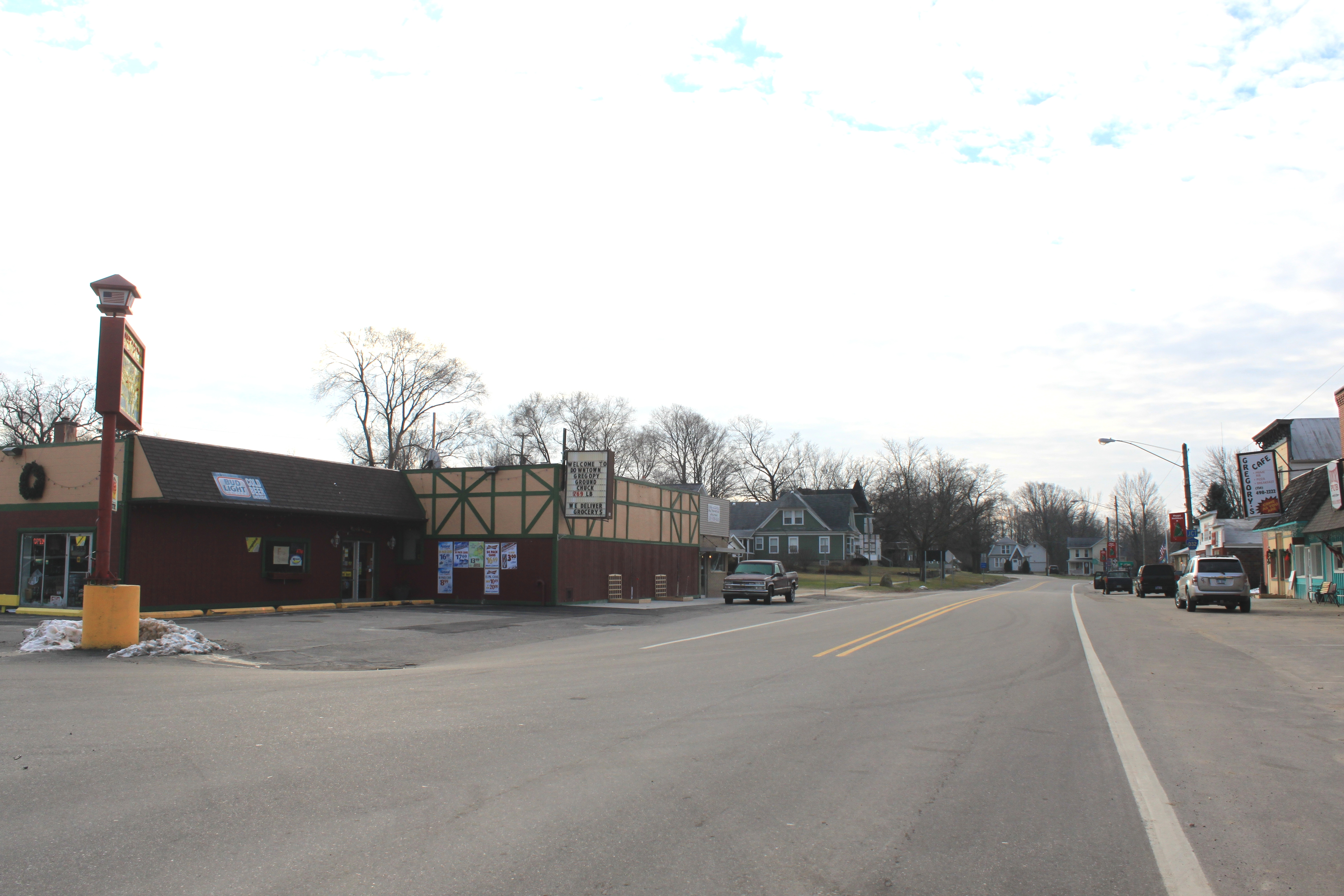
Main Street, Gregory

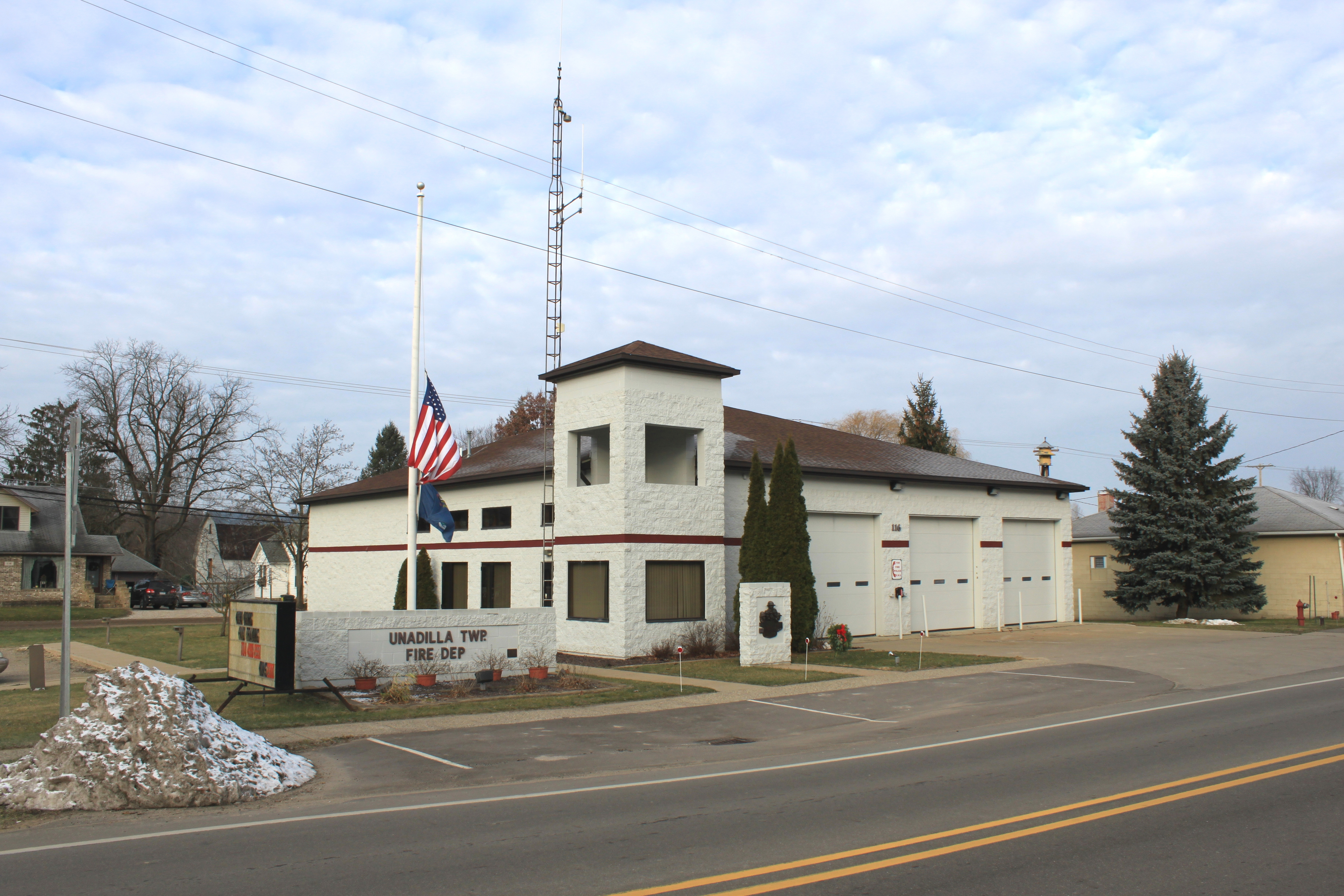
Unadilla Township Fire Department, Gregory

Unadilla Township is a civil township in the southwest corner of Livingston County, Michigan, United States. The population was 3,333 at the 2020 census.

== Communities ==
There are no incorporated municipalities in the township. There are a few unincorporated communities and historic locales.

- Bullis Crossing is at Barton Road and M-36 (42°28′04″N 84°01′59″W).
- Gregory began as a station on a branch of the Grand Trunk Western Railroad, which came through the farm of Halstead Gregory in 1884. He built a store near the depot and became the first postmaster in March 1884. The Township Hall is located at 126 Webb Street in Gregory.
- Kaiserville is located on the west side of Patterson Lake at Kaiser Road and Woodside Drive (42°25′54″N 84°01′49″W).
- Plainfield was the nexus of many Indian trails and a favorite Indian camping ground. Jacob Dunn and Levi Clawson, both from Newton, New Jersey, were the first to purchase land here in 1835 and to then settle. Philip Dyer, also from New Jersey, joined them in 1836. Both Dunn and Dyer operated taverns. The community was at first known as "Dyersburg", but the name of the post office, "Plainfield", was chosen in April 1837 by Dunn, after Plainfield, New Jersey. The post office operated until October 1913.
- Unadilla was at first known as "Milan". A post office was established in June 1834, but because Milan, Michigan, already had the name, the post office was called "Unadilla" after the township. But a plat had already been recorded for the "Village of Unadilla" in what is now Williamsville, so the plat was recorded as the Village of East Unadilla. This became known as simply "Unadilla" after the other village of Unadilla was abandoned. A survey for the plat was made on April 14, 1837, by Richard Peterson, Jr., but it was not recorded by the proprietors Robert Glenn and Thomas S. Gill until April 21, 1840.
- Williamsville, situated northeast of Williamsville Lake, was at first platted as the Village of Unadilla on January 30, 1837, by Darwin N. Edson and the heirs of Curtis Noble. This plat for the east half of the east half of the southwest quarter of section 28 was vacated by an act of the state Legislature on March 25, 1846. The area later became known as Williamsville.

== History ==
Unadilla was formed by an act of the Legislative Council of the Territory of Michigan on March 26, 1835, and initially included what is now Iosco Township to the north and a portion of Lyndon township in Washtenaw County on the south. The first township meeting was held on the first Monday of April 1835. Since Livingston County government was not organized until 1836, the township was at first attached to Washtenaw County. On March 6, 1838, Iosco Township was set off and with the southern portion being assigned to Lyndon Township, Unadilla assumed its present boundaries.

The first land purchase in the township was recorded on June 20, 1833, by Eli Ruggles of Brookfield, Connecticut, while accompanied by his brother-in-law, Amos Williams, and Nathaniel Noble, an acquaintance who lived nearby in Dexter. After returning to Connecticut, Ruggles became ill and died. Williams returned to the land in the fall of 1833 with his son Samuel, son-in-law Gary Briggs, and Briggs' wife. The land purchase was recorded as the north half of the northwest quarter of section 33, which would have been 80 acres (320,000 m^{2}), but in subsequent accounts was frequently described as 40 acres (160,000 m^{2}). During that winter the Williams and family built a sawmill, which began operations in the spring of 1834.

== Geography ==
Unadilla Township occupies the southwest corner of Livingston County, bordered to the west by Ingham County and to the south by Washtenaw and Jackson counties. Two state highways pass through the township. M-36 crosses the center of the township, leading east 7 miles (11 km) to Pinckney and northwest 16 miles (26 km) to Dansville. M-106 has its northeastern terminus at M-36 in Gregory and leads southwest 27 miles (43 km) to Jackson.

According to the United States Census Bureau, the township has a total area of 89.9 square miles (233 km^{2}), of which 33.8 square miles (87.5 km^{2}) are land and 0.93 square miles (2.4 km^{2}), or 2.67%, are water.

Lakelands Trail State Park passes through Unadilla Township.

== Demographics ==
As of the census of 2000, there were 3,190 people, 1,156 households, and 877 families residing in the township. The population density was 93.8 inhabitants per square mile (36.2/km^{2}). There were 1,292 housing units at an average density of 38.0 per square mile (14.7/km^{2}). The racial makeup of the township was 97.34% White, 0.38% African American, 0.44% Native American, 0.38% Asian, 0.06% from other races, and 1.41% from two or more races. Hispanic or Latino of any race were 1.25% of the population.

There were 1,156 households, out of which 34.3% had children under the age of 18 living with them, 63.6% were married couples living together, 7.8% had a female householder with no husband present, and 24.1% were non-families. 18.9% of all households were made up of individuals, and 6.1% had someone living alone who was 65 years of age or older. The average household size was 2.74 and the average family size was 3.11.

In the township the population was spread out, with 26.0% under the age of 18, 6.7% from 18 to 24, 31.2% from 25 to 44, 25.5% from 45 to 64, and 10.7% who were 65 years of age or older. The median age was 38 years. For every 100 females, there were 100.3 males. For every 100 females age 18 and over, there were 102.4 males.

The median income for a household in the township was $52,433, and the median income for a family was $58,036. Males had a median income of $42,262 versus $28,017 for females. The per capita income for the township was $21,689. About 2.5% of families and 3.2% of the population were below the poverty line, including 1.8% of those under age 18 and 4.4% of those age 65 or over.
