= Williamsville, Michigan =

Williamsville may refer to either of two small unincorporated communities in the U.S. state of Michigan:

- Williamsville, Livingston County, Michigan
- Williamsville, Cass County, Michigan
