= Pinckney High School =

Pinckney Community High School

Location
- 10255 Dexter-Pinckney Road, Pinckney, Michigan 48169
- Coordinates: 42.45°N 83.93°W

Information
- Established: 1888
- School district: Pinckney Community Schools
- Principal: Julia McBride
- Teaching staff: 35.95 (on an FTE basis)
- Enrollment: 628 (2023-2024)
- Student to teacher ratio: 17.47
- Colors: Black; Red; White
- Athletics: MHSAA Class A
- Athletics conference: SEC White Division
- Mascot: Pirate
- Yearbook: Pirate Log
- Website: Pinckney High School

Pinckney High School, or Pinckney Community High School (PCHS) is a high school located in Putnam Township, Michigan. The current high school building is at 10255 Dexter-Pinckney Road in Putnam Township.

== History ==
Pinckney High School was founded in 1888. After a number of additions and renovations, the high school building was built. Eventually the growing number of students demanded a new high school. The first class graduated in 1967 at the new high school on M-36. In 1966, the current "Pathfinder" building was built. This became the new high school until again, the number of students exceeded the amount of space available. In 1999 another high school building was built to house grades 9–12. Today this building is still used as the high school. It features four soccer/football fields, four baseball diamonds, ten tennis courts, and a full track and field area. In spite of having four football fields, football games were still held at Pathfinder Middle School where the main football stadium (Wes Reader) was until the 2011 football season. In 2010, a $59 million bond proposal passed which included a new sports facility. Pirate Stadium cost five million dollars and hosted its first football game on September 2, 2011. The stadium includes bathrooms, home and away bleachers, a coach and player room, and a new turf field.

== Sports ==
The Pinckney High School men's cross country team took the state championship for three years in a row (2005, 2006, 2007) 2nd in the state in 2004 and later 3rd in the state in 2009, led by Coach Tom Carney. On February 25, 2011, the boys' basketball team beat Brighton High School 67–64 2OT to win the KLAA Lakes Conference title. On February 25, 2012, the boys' basketball team beat Walled Lake Central 54–50 to win the KLAA Lakes Conference title for the second year in a row. On July 21, 2012, the boys' basketball team won the Division II AYBT National Championship. On October 25, 2013, the football team clinched its first playoff berth since 2001.

== Performing Arts ==
The Pinckney High School Band is one of the largest organizations in the school, conducted by Kevin Welling. When the first yearbook was published in 1957, the band had thirteen members. As of the 2022/2023 school year, the band consists of approximately 40 students. Students have regularly participated in such ensembles as the Livingston County Honors Band and the MSBOA High-School All-State Band and Orchestra as well as District and State Solo and Ensemble Festivals.

The band participates in a number of different activities such as Eastern Michigan University's Band Day, the Festival of Lights Parade held in Howell, Michigan, the Memorial Day Parades held in downtown Pinckney and nearby Hamburg, and Light Up The Park, where the citizens decorate the square with Christmas lights and the children get to visit Santa Claus. One of the biggest events of the year for the high school band is the annual Spaghetti Dinner & Business Expo. The dinner features the bands and orchestras from both the middle school and the high school.

ACT2 Theatre Company is a student-run drama club, Troupe #4619 of the International Thespian Society, based at Pinckney High School. Recognized for performances at international theatre festivals, ACT2 Theatre Company annually performs plays and musicals, including the Experimental Theatre Project — a collection of student-written short plays and films.

== Recent events ==
The Board of Education approved a resolution to put a bond proposal on the ballot scheduled for November 3, 2009. This bond would give the district $59.4 million to upgrade and repair existing facilities. The first $15 million of this would be interest free as it would come from the federal government's stimulus package. Each classroom in the Pinckney Community Schools District was supplied with interactive Smart Board. Students grade 7–12 also received their own MacBook laptop computer. The bond also approved connecting Pathfinder School (grades 7–8) with Navigator School (grades 5–6). A new bus garage was also added along with new buses.

== Notable alumni ==
- Robert Sabuda, New York Times bestselling pop-up book author
- Chris Sabin, Professional Wrestler
- Zach Sieler, NFL player
