= Richmond Field =

Airport in Michigan, United States

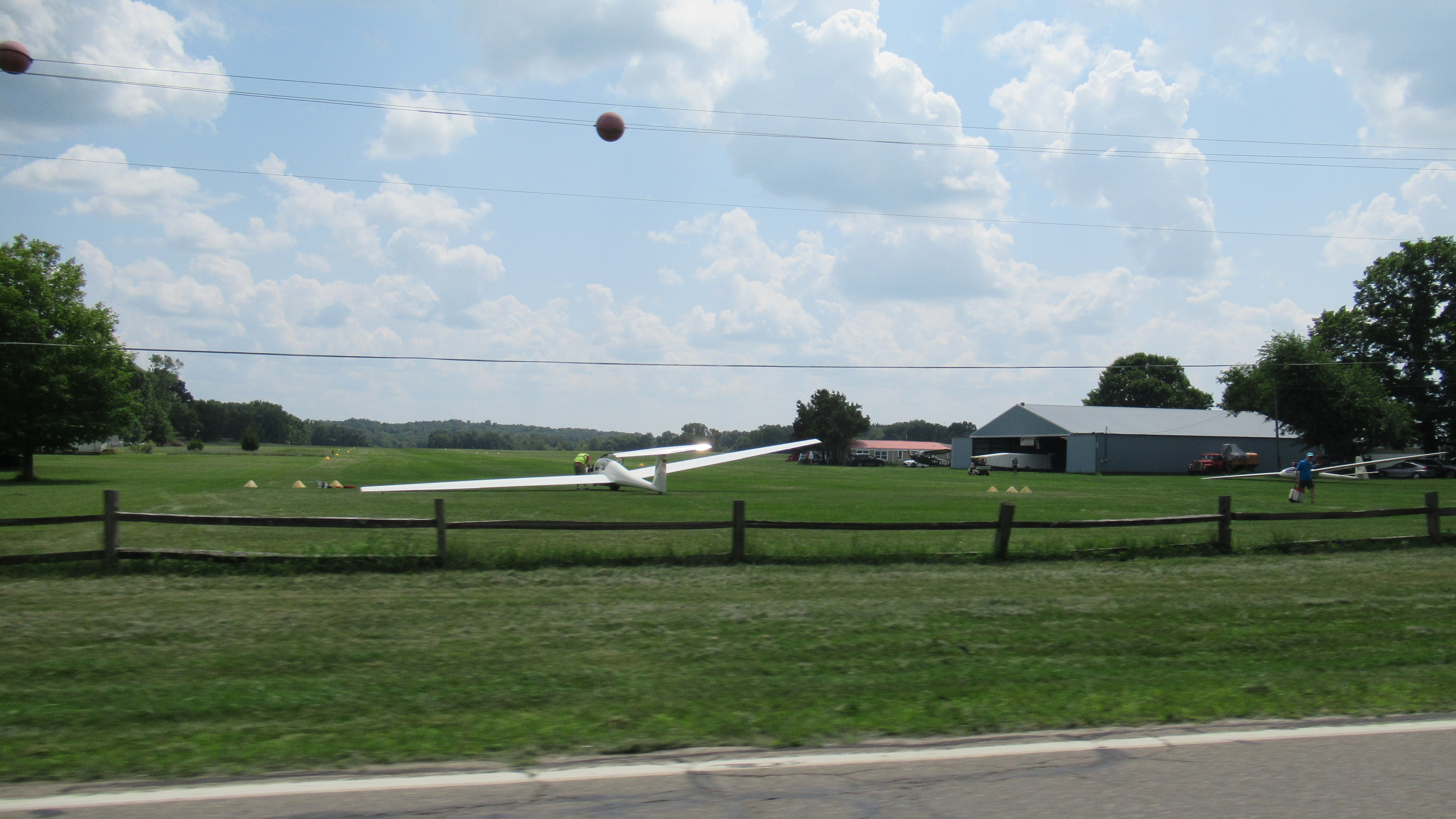
- View from Doyle Road
- IATA: none; ICAO: none; FAA LID: 69G

Summary
- Airport type: Public use
- Owner: James Barnes
- Serves: Gregory, Michigan
- Time zone: UTC−05:00 (-5)
  - Summer (DST): UTC−04:00 (-4)
- Elevation AMSL: 921 ft / 281 m
- Coordinates: 42°26′30″N 084°03′59″W

Map
- Location of airport in Michigan

Runways
Direction	Length		Surface
Direction	ft	m	Surface
18/36	2,471	753	Turf

Statistics (2021)
- Aircraft operations: 6,552
- Based aircraft: 36
- Source: Federal Aviation Administration

Richmond Field (FAA LID: 69G) is a privately owned, public use airport. It is located two nautical miles (4 km) southeast of the central business district of Gregory, a city in Livingston County, Michigan, United States.

The airport is home to multiple gliding clubs.

== Facilities and aircraft ==
Richmond Field covers an area of 145 acres (59 ha) at an elevation of 921 feet (281 m) above mean sea level. It has one runway designated 18/36 with a turf surface measuring 2,471 by 100 feet (753 x 30 m).

There is no fixed-base operator at the airport. In 1994, a local gliding club purchased additional land at the airport in order to make facility upgrades themselves.

Presently, Sandhill Soaring Club, a Michigan nonprofit corporation and Chapter of the Soaring Society of America, operates a fleet of gliders and tow-planes at Richmond Field that range from primary trainers (gliders) to single-place 18-Meter and two-seat 20-Meter racing sailplanes. The gliding club conducts both aerotow and ground launch operations at Richmond Field, and provides training in both launch methods. The Club's members, including its tow-pilots and FAA Certified Flight Instructors (CFI-G), volunteer their time and services for free. Visitors may purchase discovery flights in a glider to see what gliding (otherwise known as Soaring), is like and to determine whether they would like to take flying lessons to become a certificated glider pilot themselves. The club has a vibrant Juniors program that supports youth involvement in soaring. This has led to several members obtaining their ATP ratings and pursuing professional careers in aviation as Airline Pilots or Corporate Jet Pilots, while others have pursued careers in Aerospace engineering or gained admission to the USAF Academy.

For the 12-month period ending December 31, 2021, the airport had 6,552 general aviation aircraft operations, an average of 18 per day. At that time there were 36 aircraft based at this airport: 32 gliders and 4 single-engine airplanes.

== Accidents and incidents ==
- In June 2006, a Beechcraft Bonanza crashed while attempting a diversion to Richmond Field due to engine power loss. The probable cause of the accident was found to be the non-mechanical loss of engine power for undetermined reasons during cruise flight and the unsuitable terrain the pilot selected for the forced landing.
- On December 14, 2006, a Schleicher AS-K13 contacted trees while on final approach to land. The pilot reported that when he entered the traffic pattern he noticed the wind sock was shifting and the glider was losing altitude at a rate that was faster than the previous flight. He stated that because of this, he turned onto base leg sooner than normal. He reported, "Upon turning there was an immediate sense of an inability to penetrate thru the airmass as the glider continued to lose altitude." He stated he lowered the nose of the glider in an attempt to gain airspeed and flew an abbreviated base leg, heading straight for the runway. The pilot reported he then noted a shift in the wind and the glider descended into the 75 foot tall trees northeast of the approach end of the runway. The probable cause was found to be the pilot's unexpected encounter with wind shear and his inability to remain clear of the trees while on final approach to land.
- On May 10, 2008, a Schleicher AS-K13 was involved in an accident after takeoff from Richmond Field. The glider became airborne from the towplane and was consistently flying higher than it needed to be. After releasing from the towline, the glider resumed a level pitch attitude and began to decelerate. The pilot selected full nose down trim, in response to his limited pitch control. The glider continued to decelerate and subsequently landed hard on the turf runway. The main landing gear and aft fuselage tubular support structure was substantially damaged during the hard landing. Both wingtips were damaged and there were several fabric tears on the left wing and fuselage. After exiting the glider, the pilot found his handheld communication radio on the cockpit floor. The pilot said that during takeoff the radio must have fell off his seat onto the cockpit floor, restricting the movement of the control stick. The probable cause was found to be the pilot's failure to adequately secure his handheld radio prior to takeoff, which resulted in a restriction of the flight control stick and loss of control. Following this incident, the Operator of the aircraft implemented new policies requiring the wing-runner to go through a pre-takeoff checklist of their own (before hooking up the glider), that includes having the Pilot In Command and any passengers check to make sure "all loose items are stowed and secure." This would include any portable radios, cell phones, cameras, etc. This would become a best practice adopted by other gliding clubs.
- On July 29, 2012, an experimental Smith Applebay Zuni II glider sustained substantial damage when it impacted trees and terrain while in the traffic pattern at the Richmond Field Airport. The pilot had just departed the airport and was unable to find the necessary lift to complete the flight, and even after he joined the downwind leg to land at the airport, he still could not find the needed lift. A witness located at the airport reported that he observed the glider on the downwind leg. He reported that the glider's altitude was low, about 125 to 150 feet agl, and it was in close to the airport and flying "somewhat slowly." The glider seemed to slow down even more as it began to turn to the base leg. The glider's left wing stalled, and the glider pitched down nearly vertically. It completed about 1/2 spin before it disappeared behind the trees about 2,000 feet away. The probable cause was found to be the glider pilot's failure to maintain sufficient altitude and airspeed while turning to the base leg of the traffic pattern, which resulted in a stall/spin and impact with trees and terrain. Both stalls and spin training (recognition and prevention), are included in the curriculum taught to Student Glider Pilots as they pursue a Private Pilot Glider Certificate, the minimum rating required of glider pilots to take passengers for a ride. Commercial Pilots and FAA Certified Flight Instructors get further instruction in these areas too.

== See also ==
- List of airports in Michigan
