= Lakelands Trail State Park =

State park in Michigan, United States

Mike Levine Lakelands Trail State Park
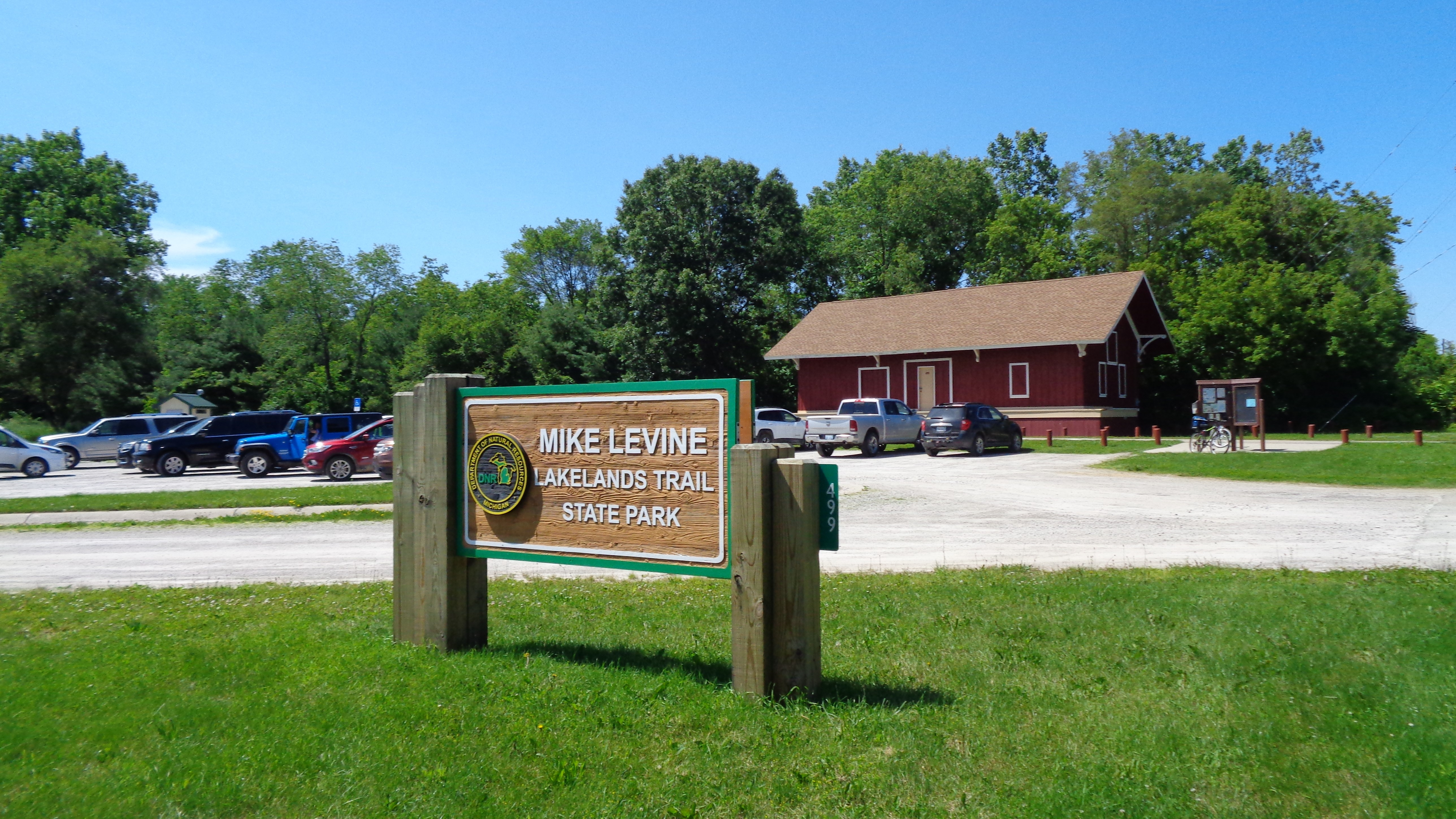
- Signage along the trail in Pinckney

- Location within Michigan Location within the United States
- Location: Lower Peninsula, Ingham County, Livingston County, Washtenaw County, Michigan USA
- Nearest city: Pinckney, Michigan
- Coordinates: 42°28′03″N 84°00′27″W
- Established: 1991
- Governing body: Michigan Department of Natural Resources
- Length: 26 mi (42 km)
- Trailheads: Stockbridge, Michigan; Hamburg Township, Michigan
- Use: Cycling, Equestrian, Hiking, XC skiing, Running
- Difficulty: Easy
- Season: All
- Website: Official site

Lakelands Trail State Park, officially the Mike Levine Lakelands Trail State Park since January 20, 2017, is a state park in Michigan that runs east–west from southwest of Munith to Hamburg Township, Michigan. It is a multi-use trail converted from abandoned railroad corridors. According to the Michigan DNR web site, the north side of the trail is for hiking and biking, and the south side is for horseback riding. Based on the latest published DNR map the trail is 31.9 miles (51.3 km) long with the surface from Hawkins Rd. southwest of Munith to west of Pinckney composed of sections of crushed limestone, slag and sand, or unimproved. 10 miles (16 km) are paved in Hamburg Township from the first intersection with M-36 west of Pinckney to end of the park east of the Hamburg Rd. trailhead. A paved section of trail also extends from the edge of the park east of Hamburg Rd. to the west side of Whitmore Lake Rd., just south of its intersection with 9 Mile Rd in Green Oak Township.

From Stockbridge to Pinckney, horses are routinely ridden on the unpaved trail surface. Only the paved portion from just west of Pinckney to the east end in Hamburg Township is consistently usable by bicyclists.

== History ==
Grand Trunk Western railroad abandoned its route in 1978 and gave the land between Jackson and Lakeland to the state. In December of 1986, as the organization Friends of the Lakeland Trail sought to persuade the state to develop a trail from the railroad route, the state declined to purchase the railroad between Lakeland and Wixom. Later that month, homeowners near Whitmore Lake purchased parts of the route to add to their yards, creating the present gap between the Lakelands Trail and the Huron Valley Trail. Lakelands Trail opened in 1994. The trail forms a section of the Great Lake to Lake Trail Route 1.

== Waypoints ==
Waypoints for Lakelands Trail State Park. ↑ in the Distance column points to the other waypoint that the distance is between.

Location	Services	Distance (approx.)	Coordinates
Stockbridge, Michigan	Parking		42°26′43″N 84°10′47″W
Gregory, Michigan	Parking	↑ 5 miles (8.0 km)	42°27′37″N 84°05′05″W
Pinckney, Michigan	Parking	↑ 7.3 miles (11.7 km)	42°27′38″N 83°56′33″W
Merrill Road	Parking	↑ 6.2 miles (10.0 km)	42°27′14″N 83°49′16″W
Hamburg Road		↑ 1 mile (1.6 km)	42°26′52″N 83°48′06″W
