= Stockbridge, Michigan =

- Village
- Village of Stockbridge
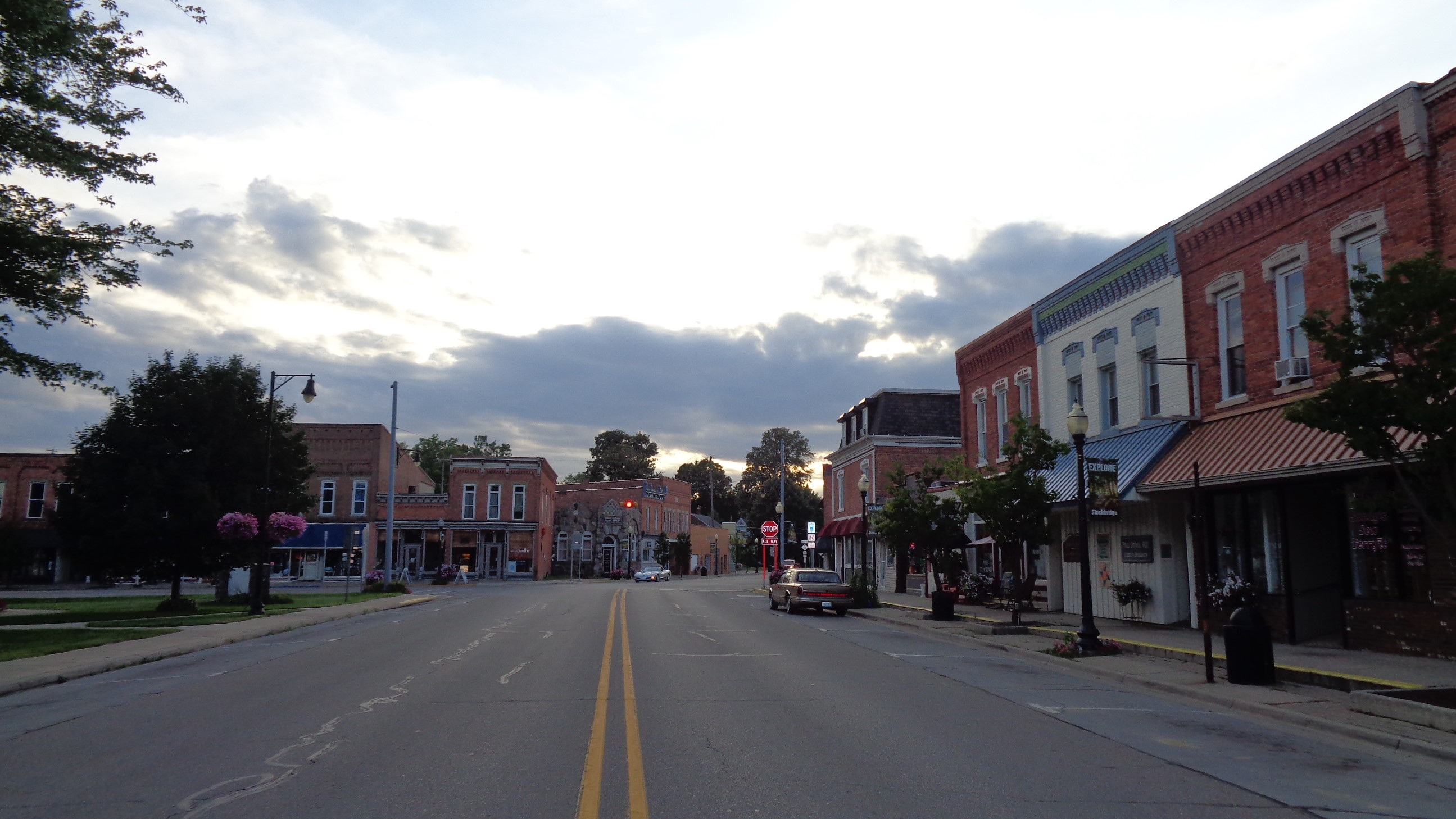
- Downtown looking west toward M-52 / M-106

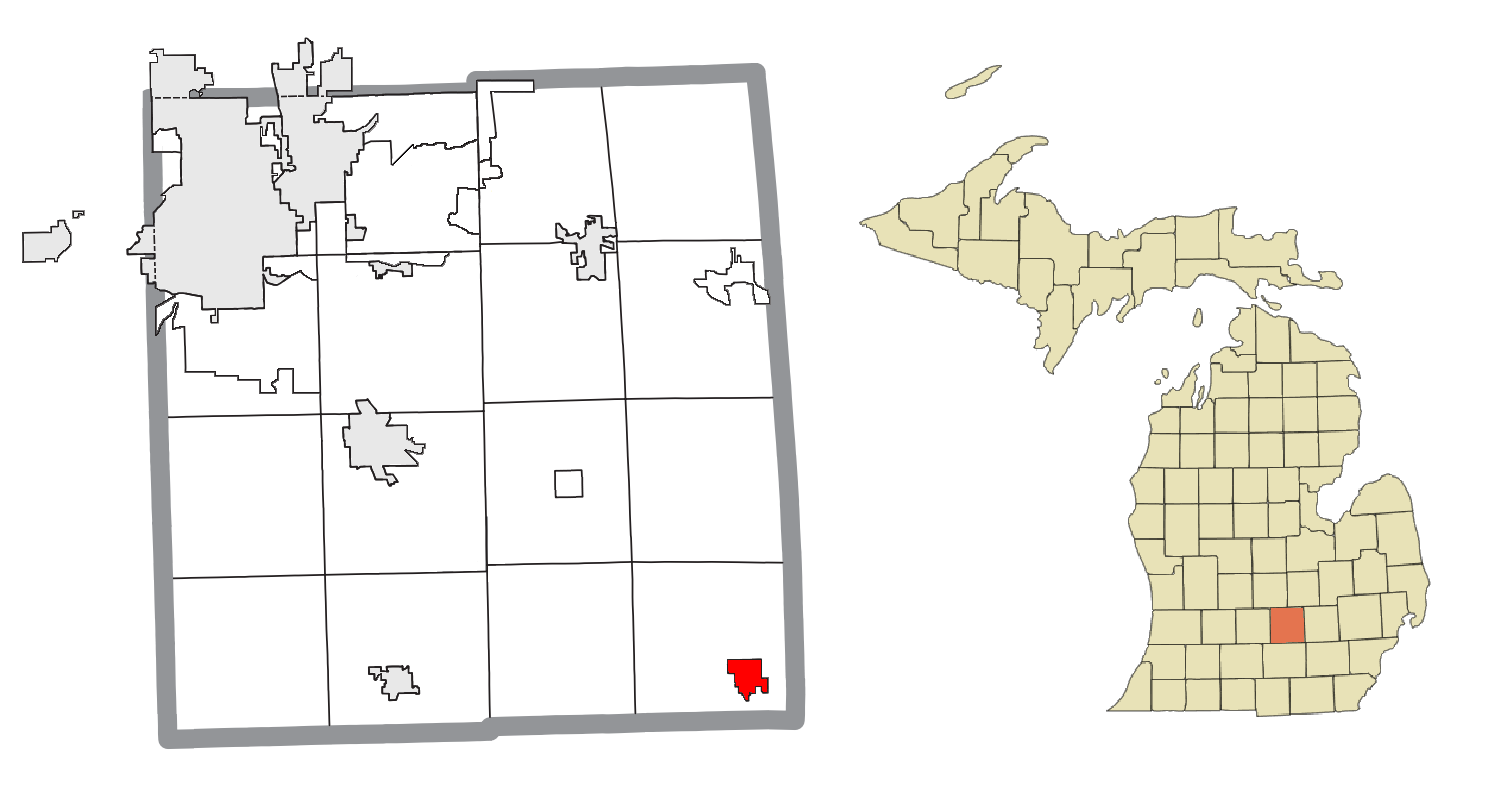
- Location within Ingham County

- Location within the state of Michigan Location within the United States
- Coordinates: 42°26′54″N 84°10′32″W
- Country: United States
- State: Michigan
- County: Ingham
- Township: Stockbridge
- Settled: 1835

Government
  - Type: Village council
  - President: Jill Ogden
  - Clerk: Heather Armstrong

Area
  - Total: 1.52 sq mi (3.94 km^{2})
  - Land: 1.50 sq mi (3.89 km^{2})
  - Water: 0.015 sq mi (0.04 km^{2})
- Elevation: 932 ft (284 m)

Population (2020)
  - Total: 1,244
  - Density: 827.5/sq mi (319.49/km^{2})
- Time zone: UTC-5 (Eastern (EST))
  - Summer (DST): UTC-4 (EDT)
- ZIP code(s): 49285
- Area code: 517
- FIPS code: 26-76560
- GNIS feature ID: 2399902
- Website: Official website

Stockbridge is a village in Ingham County in the U.S. state of Michigan. It is located within Stockbridge Township about 36 miles (58 km) southeast from downtown Lansing. The population was 1,244 at the 2020 census.

== Geography ==
According to the United States Census Bureau, the village has a total area of 1.53 square miles (3.96 km^{2}), of which 1.51 square miles (3.91 km^{2}) is land and 0.02 square miles (0.05 km^{2}) is water. The westernmost trailhead of Lakelands Trail State Park is located within Stockbridge at 42°26′43″N 84°10′47″W and travels 26 miles (42 km) east to Hamburg Township.

== Demographics ==
Historical population
Census	Pop.	Note	%±
1880	160		—
1890	497		210.6%
1900	677		36.2%
1910	663		−2.1%
1920	749		13.0%
1930	715		−4.5%
1940	852		19.2%
1950	1,098		28.9%
1960	1,097		−0.1%
1970	1,190		8.5%
1980	1,213		1.9%
1990	1,202		−0.9%
2000	1,260		4.8%
2010	1,218		−3.3%
2020	1,244		2.1%
U.S. Decennial Census

=== 2010 census ===
As of the census of 2010, there were 1,218 people, 481 households, and 328 families living in the village. The population density was 806.6 inhabitants per square mile (311.4/km^{2}). There were 552 housing units at an average density of 365.6 per square mile (141.2/km^{2}). The racial makeup of the village was 96.7% White, 0.2% African American, 0.9% Native American, 0.2% Asian, 0.1% from other races, and 1.8% from two or more races. Hispanic or Latino residents of any race were 3.1% of the population.

There were 481 households, of which 39.9% had children under the age of 18 living with them, 46.4% were married couples living together, 17.0% had a female householder with no husband present, 4.8% had a male householder with no wife present, and 31.8% were non-families. 27.9% of all households were made up of individuals, and 12.3% had someone living alone who was 65 years of age or older. The average household size was 2.53 and the average family size was 3.09.

The median age in the village was 36.8 years. 29.4% of residents were under the age of 18; 8.2% were between the ages of 18 and 24; 23.4% were from 25 to 44; 26.6% were from 45 to 64; and 12.3% were 65 years of age or older. The gender makeup of the village was 46.8% male and 53.2% female.

=== 2000 census ===
As of the census of 2000, there were 1,260 people, 480 households, and 322 families living in the village. The population density was 866.1 inhabitants per square mile (334.4/km^{2}). There were 510 housing units at an average density of 350.6 per square mile (135.4/km^{2}). The racial makeup of the village was 97.70% White, 0.79% Native American, 0.24% Asian, 0.48% from other races, and 0.79% from two or more races. Hispanic or Latino residents of any race were 1.03% of the population.

There were 480 households, out of which 35.8% had children under the age of 18 living with them, 52.5% were married couples living together, 10.8% had a female householder with no husband present, and 32.9% were non-families. 29.6% of all households were made up of individuals, and 14.0% had someone living alone who was 65 years of age or older. The average household size was 2.53 and the average family size was 3.17.

In the village, 28.0% of the population was under the age of 18, 7.9% was from 18 to 24, 30.5% from 25 to 44, 18.4% from 45 to 64, and 15.2% was 65 years of age or older. The median age was 35 years. For every 100 females, there were 83.1 males. For every 100 females age 18 and over, there were 80.3 males.

The median income for a household in the village was $38,456, and the median income for a family was $47,250. Males had a median income of $40,625 versus $26,250 for females. The per capita income for the village was $17,614. About 8.3% of families and 11.6% of the population were below the poverty line, including 17.0% of those under age 18 and 7.6% of those age 65 or over.

== Notable people ==
- Lisa McClain (born 1966), U.S. representative for Michigan
