= Hamburg Township, Michigan =

- Civil township
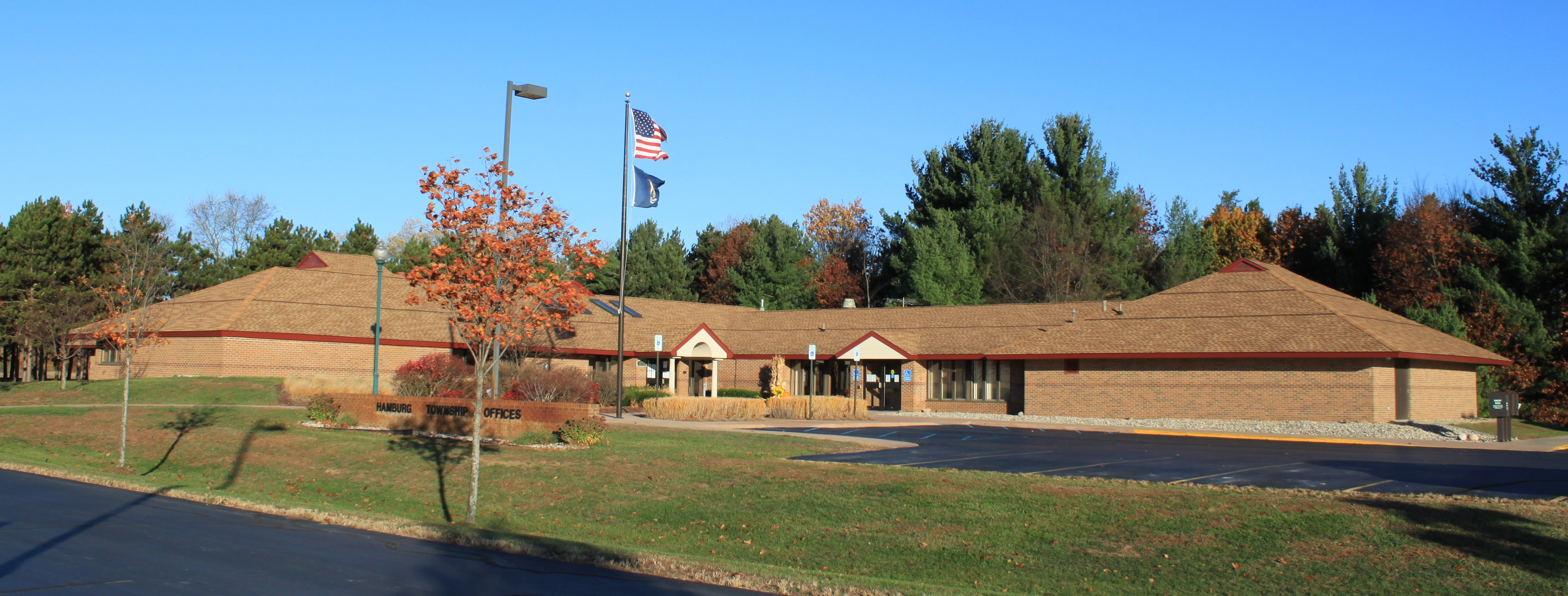
- Hamburg Township Hall
- Motto: "A Great Place To Grow!"
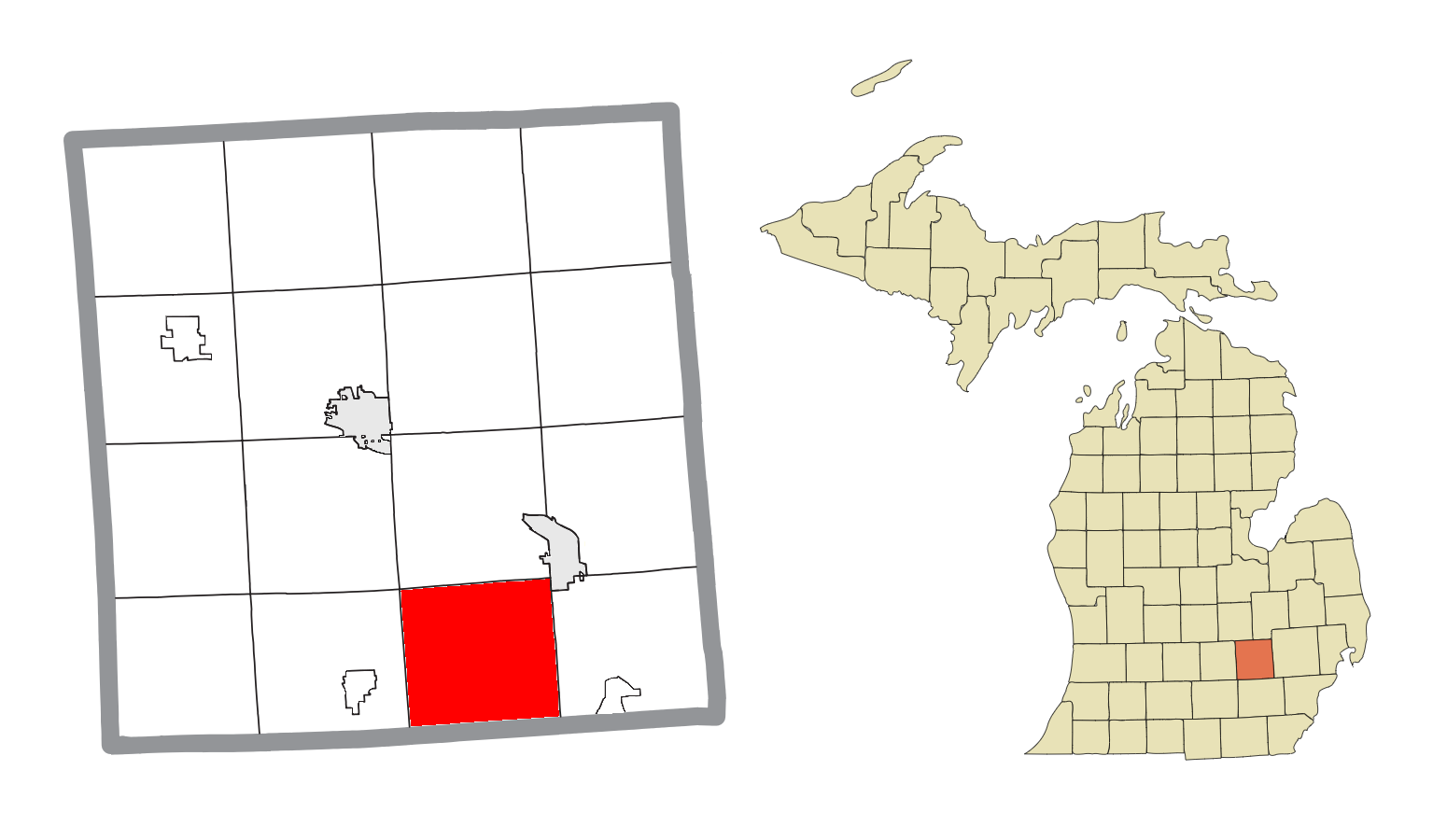
- Location within Livingston County

- Location in Michigan Location in the United States
- Coordinates: 42°27′47″N 83°50′53″W
- Country: United States
- State: Michigan
- County: Livingston
- Established: 1835

Government
  - Supervisor: Jason Negri
  - Clerk: Michael Dolan

Area
  - Civil township: 36.0 sq mi (93.3 km^{2})
  - Land: 32.2 sq mi (83.5 km^{2})
  - Water: 3.8 sq mi (9.8 km^{2})
- Elevation: 850 ft (260 m)

Population (2020)
  - Civil township: 21,259
  - Density: 659/sq mi (255/km^{2})
  - Metro: 4,296,250 (Metro Detroit)
- Time zone: UTC-5 (Eastern (EST))
  - Summer (DST): UTC-4 (EDT)
- ZIP code(s): 48116 (Brighton); 48139 (Hamburg); 48143 (Lakeland); 48169 (Pinckney); 48189 (Whitmore Lake); 48843 (Howell)
- Area code: 810
- FIPS code: 26-36100
- GNIS feature ID: 1626420
- Website: www.hamburg.mi.us

Hamburg Township is a civil township of Livingston County in the U.S. state of Michigan. As of the 2020 census, the township population was 21,259. It is the most populated municipality in Livingston County.

== Communities ==
A trio of unincorporated communities exist within the township:

- Hamburg is in the southeast part of the township on M-36 and Hamburg Road at 42°26′55″N 83°48′06″W. The Hamburg ZIP code, 48139, serves a small area in the southeast part of the township. E.F. Gay, a merchant from Ann Arbor, bought 30 acres (120,000 m^{2}) here in 1835 and built a dam and sawmill. He sold out in 1837 to three Germans known as the Messrs. Grisson, who added a grist mill, store, and hotel. A plat was recorded in 1837. Nineteen men met to choose a name for the town. The three Germans were not allowed to vote and the others deadlocked 8–8, split between naming it "Steuben" or "Knox". The others finally agreed to allow the Messrs. Grisson to decide, and they choose the name of their hometown, Hamburg, Germany.
- Lakeland is near the center of the township on M-36 at 42°27′48″N 83°50′39″W. Named for its location in a series of lakes, a post office was established in May 1903. The Lakeland ZIP code, 48143, provides P.O. Box service.
- Pettysville is at Pettysville and Rush Lake roads (42°28′31″N 083°52′10″W).

=== Zip Code areas ===
- Brighton is to the northeast, and the Brighton ZIP code, 48116, serves northeastern areas of Hamburg Township.
- Howell is to the northwest, and the Howell ZIP code, 48843, serves some of the northwestern portion of Hamburg Township.
- Pinckney is to the west, and the Pinckney ZIP code, 48169, serves much of the western portion of Hamburg Township.
- Whitmore Lake is to the southeast, and the Whitmore Lake ZIP code, 48189, serves a portion in the southeast of Hamburg Township.

== Geography ==
Hamburg Township is in southeastern Livingston County and is bordered to the south by Washtenaw County. State highway M-36 crosses the township, passing through Lakeland and Hamburg, and leading east 5 miles (8 km) to U.S. Route 23 at Whitmore Lake and west the same distance to Pinckney.

According to the United States Census Bureau, the township has a total area of 36.0 square miles (93.3 km^{2}), of which 32.2 square miles (83.5 km^{2}) are land and 3.8 square miles (9.8 km^{2}), or 10.49%, are water. There are 32 named lakes, with numerous smaller ponds, marshes, creeks and streams. The township is part of the Huron River watershed. The river passes through the eastern and southern parts of the township as it flows toward Lake Erie.

== Parks/Lakelands Trail/Brighton State Recreation Area ==
East and West Bennett Parks off Merrill Road serve the recreational needs of township children for soccer, football, cheerleading, and softball.

Five miles of Lakelands Trail State Park have been developed through Hamburg Township, with the easternmost terminus of the trail located in the township. The trail is asphalted and parallels the state highway M-36. It is a favorite place of township residents for walking and bicycling. No motorized vehicles are permitted on the Lakelands Trail.

Just over an entire section (Section 10) of Hamburg Township contains a significant portion of the Brighton State Recreation Area. Rustic and modern campsites are available. There is a swimming beach and boat launch for Bishop Lake, together with numerous picnic areas, barbecue facilities and hiking trails.

== Demographics ==
As of the census of 2000, there were 20,627 people, 7,086 households, and 5,796 families residing in the township. The population density was 636.9 inhabitants per square mile (245.9/km^{2}). There were 7,678 housing units at an average density of 237.1 per square mile (91.5/km^{2}). The racial makeup of the township was 97.22% White, 1.02% African American, 0.28% Native American, 0.44% Asian, 0.03% Pacific Islander, 0.19% from other races, and 0.82% from two or more races. Hispanic or Latino residents of any race were 1.14% of the population.

There were 7,086 households, out of which 43.8% had children under the age of 18 living with them, 73.7% were married couples living together, 5.3% had a female householder with no husband present, and 18.2% were non-families. 13.9% of all households were made up of individuals, and 3.5% had someone living alone who was 65 years of age or older. The average household size was 2.88 and the average family size was 3.20.

In the township, 29.6% of the population was under the age of 18, 5.5% was from 18 to 24, 34.1% from 25 to 44, 24.5% from 45 to 64, and 6.3% was 65 years of age or older. The median age was 36 years. For every 100 females, there were 103.8 males. For every 100 females age 18 and over, there were 103.8 males.

The median income for a household in the township was $75,960, and the median income for a family was $81,351. Males had a median income of $56,671 versus $34,111 for females. The per capita income for the township was $30,283. About 1.5% of families and 2.4% of the population were below the poverty line, including 2.9% of those under age 18 and 4.2% of those age 65 or over.
