= Pinckney, Michigan =

- Village
- Village of Pinckney
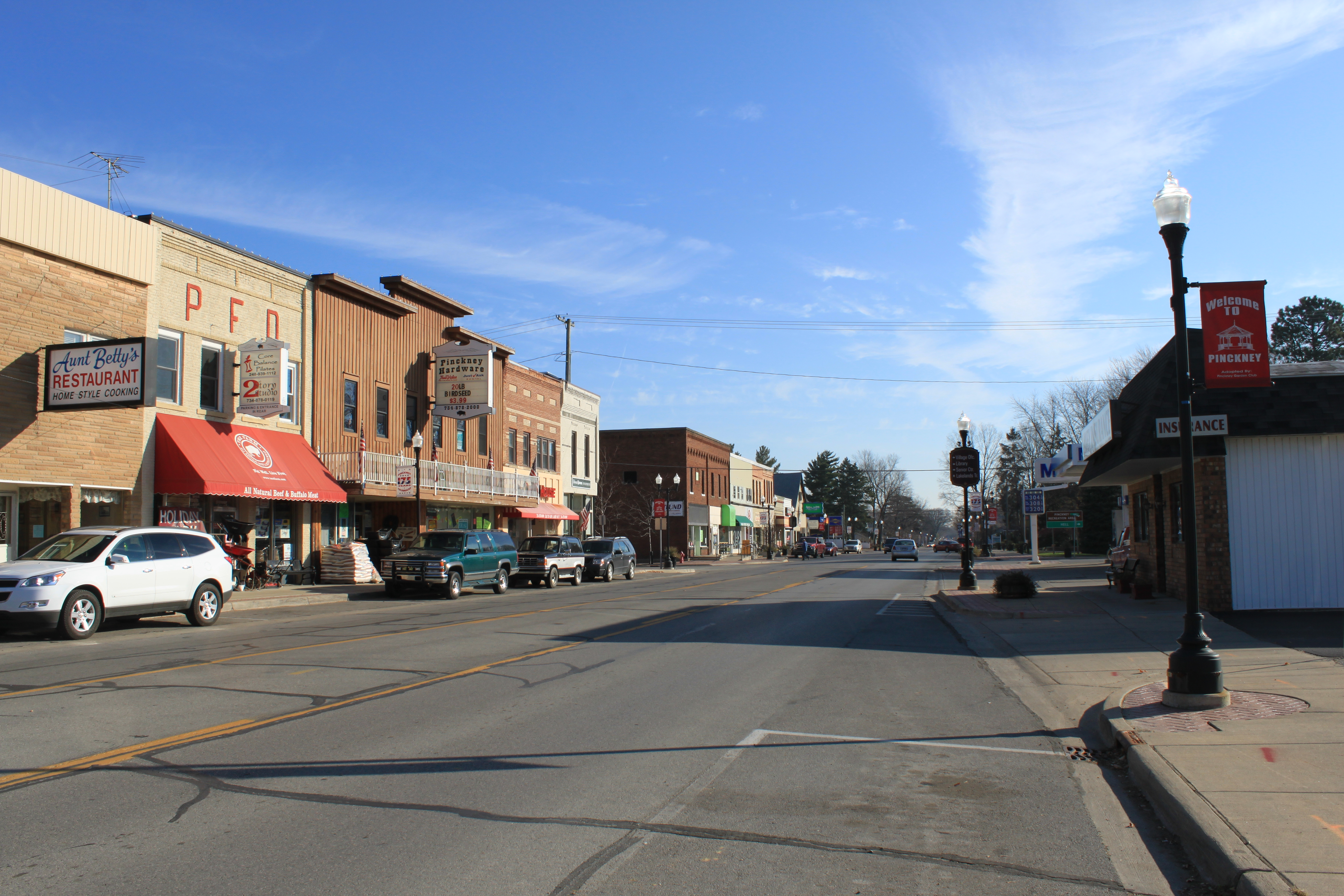
- Downtown Pinckney along Main Street (M-36)

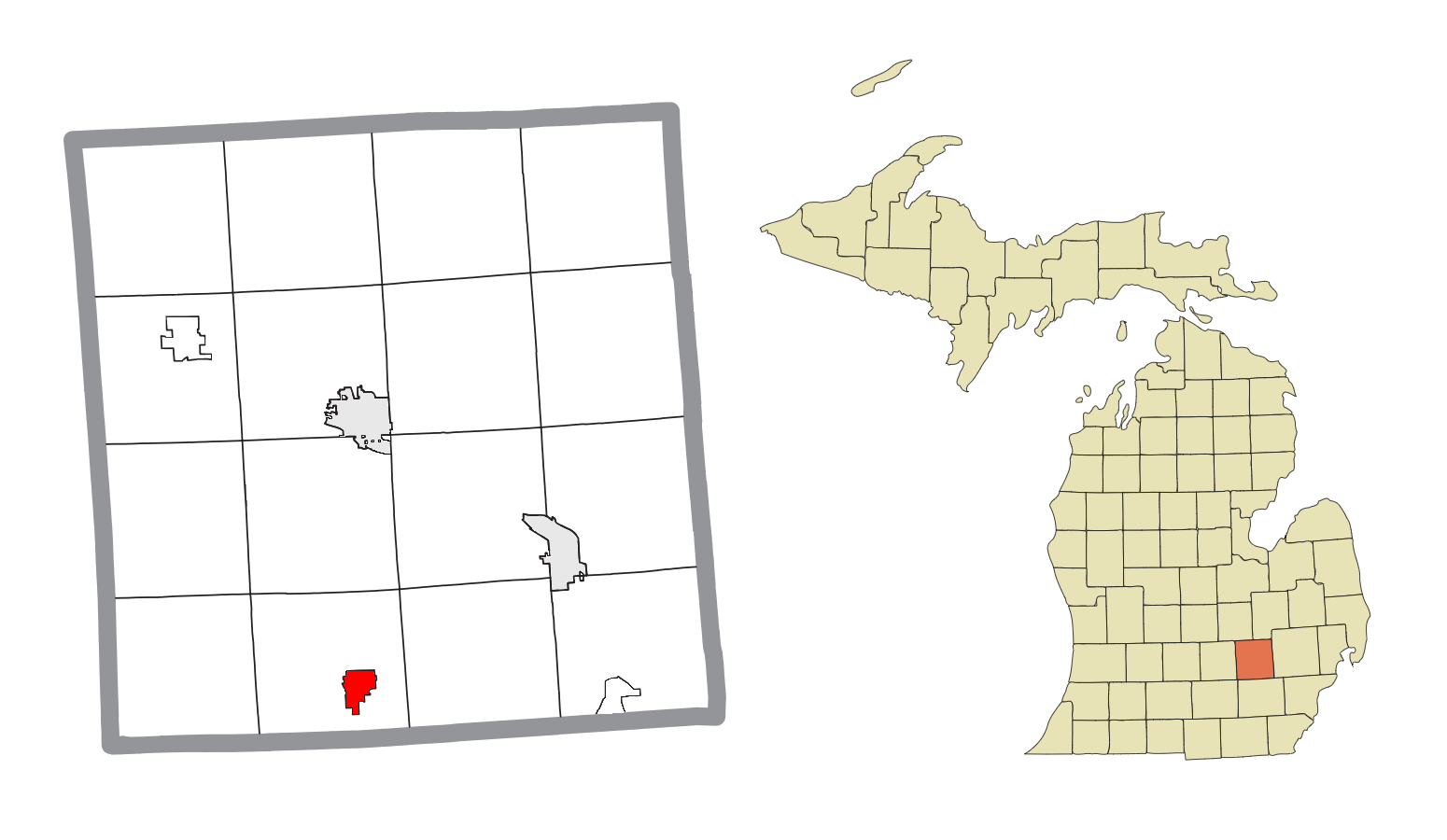
- Location within Livingston County

- Location within the state of Michigan Location within the United States
- Coordinates: 42°27′26″N 83°56′41″W
- Country: United States
- State: Michigan
- County: Livingston
- Township: Putnam
- Settled: 1827
- Platted: 1837
- Incorporated: 1883

Government
  - Type: Village council
  - President: Jeff Buerman
  - Clerk: Andrea Piotrowski McCall

Area
  - Total: 1.67 sq mi (4.33 km^{2})
  - Land: 1.61 sq mi (4.18 km^{2})
  - Water: 0.058 sq mi (0.15 km^{2})
- Elevation: 902 ft (275 m)

Population (2020)
  - Total: 2,415
  - Density: 1,500/sq mi (580/km^{2})
- Time zone: UTC-5 (Eastern (EST))
  - Summer (DST): UTC-4 (EDT)
- ZIP code(s): 48169
- Area code: 734
- FIPS code: 26-64140
- GNIS feature ID: 0634896
- Website: Official website

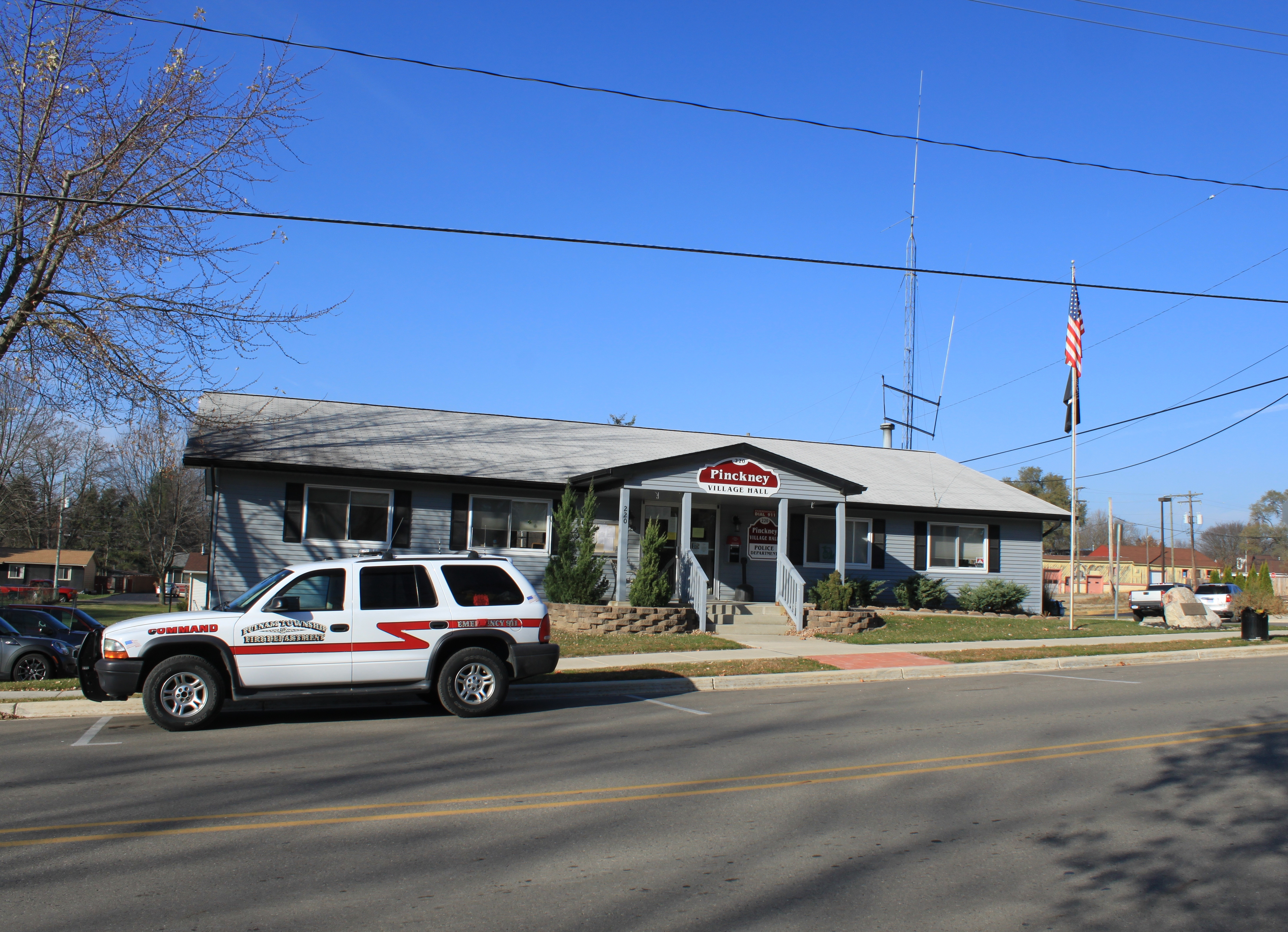
Pinckney Village Hall, S. Howell St.

Pinckney is a village in Livingston County in the U.S. state of Michigan. The population was 2,415 at the 2020 census. The village is located within Putnam Township.

Among the first American pioneers in the area around Pinckney were William Kirkland and his family, who moved from New York in the late 1820s. Kirkland named the community after his brother, Charles Pinckney Kirkland. Platted in 1837, Pinckney was incorporated as a village in 1883.

== Geography ==
According to the United States Census Bureau, the village has a total area of 1.66 square miles (4.30 km^{2}), of which 1.60 square miles (4.14 km^{2}) is land and 0.06 square miles (0.16 km^{2}) is water.

== Demographics ==
Historical population
Census	Pop.	Note	%±
1860	244		—
1870	446		82.8%
1880	427		−4.3%
1890	449		5.2%
1900	500		11.4%
1910	477		−4.6%
1920	384		−19.5%
1930	433		12.8%
1940	456		5.3%
1950	695		52.4%
1960	732		5.3%
1970	921		25.8%
1980	1,390		50.9%
1990	1,603		15.3%
2000	2,141		33.6%
2010	2,427		13.4%
2020	2,415		−0.5%
U.S. Decennial Census

=== 2020 census ===
As of the 2020 census, Pinckney had a population of 2,415. The median age was 39.1 years. 21.7% of residents were under the age of 18 and 15.4% of residents were 65 years of age or older. For every 100 females there were 92.7 males, and for every 100 females age 18 and over there were 92.3 males age 18 and over.

97.2% of residents lived in urban areas, while 2.8% lived in rural areas.

There were 921 households in Pinckney, of which 34.5% had children under the age of 18 living in them. Of all households, 52.1% were married-couple households, 16.4% were households with a male householder and no spouse or partner present, and 23.6% were households with a female householder and no spouse or partner present. About 24.9% of all households were made up of individuals and 9.9% had someone living alone who was 65 years of age or older.

There were 934 housing units, of which 1.4% were vacant. The homeowner vacancy rate was 0.4% and the rental vacancy rate was 0.6%.

Racial composition as of the 2020 census
Race	Number	Percentage
White	2,228	92.3%
Black or African American	11	0.5%
American Indian and Alaska Native	7	0.3%
Asian	26	1.1%
Native Hawaiian and Other Pacific Islander	0	0.0%
Some other race	12	0.5%
Two or more races	131	5.4%
Hispanic or Latino (of any race)	54	2.2%

=== 2010 census ===
As of the census of 2010, there were 2,427 people, 869 households, and 648 families living in the village. The population density was 1,516.9 inhabitants per square mile (585.7/km^{2}). There were 927 housing units at an average density of 579.4 per square mile (223.7/km^{2}). The racial makeup of the village was 97.9% White, 0.1% African American, 0.2% Native American, 0.3% Asian, 0.3% from other races, and 1.2% from two or more races. Hispanic or Latino of any race were 1.8% of the population.

There were 869 households, of which 45.5% had children under the age of 18 living with them, 56.4% were married couples living together, 13.6% had a female householder with no husband present, 4.6% had a male householder with no wife present, and 25.4% were non-families. 21.5% of all households were made up of individuals, and 6.5% had someone living alone who was 65 years of age or older. The average household size was 2.78 and the average family size was 3.25.

The median age in the village was 34.1 years. 31.2% of residents were under the age of 18; 6.5% were between the ages of 18 and 24; 31.3% were from 25 to 44; 23.6% were from 45 to 64; and 7.4% were 65 years of age or older. The gender makeup of the village was 49.0% male and 51.0% female.

=== 2000 census ===
As of the census of 2000, there were 2,141 people, 731 households, and 573 families living in the village. The population density was 1,436.8 inhabitants per square mile (554.8/km^{2}). There were 778 housing units at an average density of 522.1 per square mile (201.6/km^{2}). The racial makeup of the village was 97.80% White, 0.14% African American.

There were 731 households, out of which 48.7% had children under the age of 18 living with them, 62.7% were married couples living together, 11.9% had a female householder with no husband present, and 21.6% were non-families. 16.7% of all households were made up of individuals, and 6.4% had someone living alone who was 65 years of age or older. The average household size was 2.90 and the average family size was 3.28.

In the village, the population was spread out, with 32.7% under the age of 18, 7.7% from 18 to 24, 36.0% from 25 to 44, 17.7% from 45 to 64, and 6.0% who were 65 years of age or older. The median age was 31 years. For every 100 females, there were 102.6 males. For every 100 females age 18 and over, there were 99.7 males.

The median income for a household in the village was $58,077, and the median income for a family was $60,776. Males had a median income of $45,125 versus $27,198 for females. The per capita income for the village was $20,429. About 4.4% of families and 5.7% of the population were below the poverty line, including 4.8% of those under age 18 and 9.9% of those age 65 or over.

== Education ==
Pinckney is home to Pinckney Community Schools, which consists of Pinckney High School, Pathfinder School, Navigator Upper Elementary, Country Elementary, and Farley Hill Elementary. Lakeland Elementary, Pinckney Elementary and Hamburg Elementary have been closed due to the decrease of residents in the area. Also home to a Montessori Charter school called Light of the World Academy, and St. Marys Catholic School.

== Cultural life and recreation ==
Pinckney hosts annual parades on Saint Patrick's Day and Memorial Day. Nearby the village (to the west) is the Pinckney State Recreation Area, and also the popular tourist destination of Hell, Michigan. Lakelands Trail State Park passes through Pinckney.

== Notable people ==
- Ron Jeffries, Computer Scientist, co-inventor of Extreme Programming, and co-creator of the Agile Manifesto
- Caroline Kirkland, 19th century writer and wife of village founder William Kirkland
- Denny McLain, former pitcher for the Detroit Tigers
- Chris Sabin, professional wrestler
- Robert Sabuda, children's pop-up book artist and paper engineer
- Zach Sieler, defensive end for the Miami Dolphins
- Glendon Swarthout, novelist and short story writer
- Jake Vedder, Snowboarder for 2022 Winter Olympics Snowboard Cross team
- Ryan Donovan, professional ice hockey player.
- Dominik Shine, professional ice hockey player.
- Erik Reichenbach, comic illustrator/ graphic designer and contestant on Survivor: Micronesia and Survivor: Caramoan
