= Green Lake, Michigan =

Green Lake, Michigan may refer to:

- Green Lake (Grand Traverse County, Michigan)
- Green Lake (Washtenaw County, Michigan)
- Green Lake Township, Grand Traverse County, Michigan
- Green Lake, Allegan County, Michigan, an unincorporated community
