= Green Lake (Washtenaw County, Michigan) =

Fresh water lake in Michigan

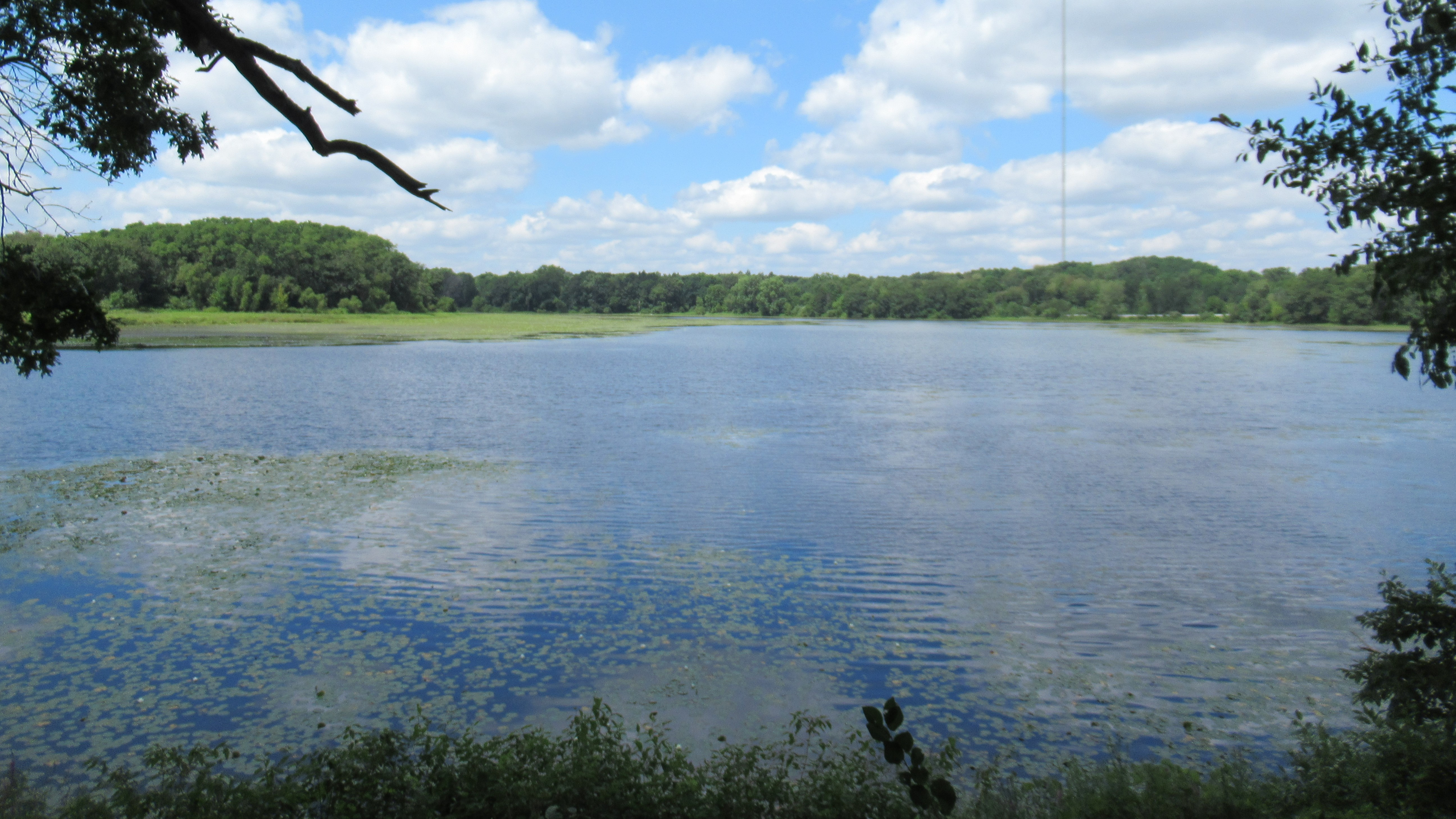
- View from the campground looking north

- Location within the state of Michigan
- Location: Waterloo Recreation Area; Washtenaw County, Michigan
- Coordinates: 42°22′05″N 84°04′20″W
- Type: Fresh water
- Basin countries: United States
- Surface area: 90.5 acres (36.6 ha)
- Max. depth: 11 feet (3.4 m)
- Surface elevation: 951 feet (290 m)
- Islands: none
- Settlements: Lyndon Township

Green Lake is a fresh water lake located in northwest Washtenaw County in the U.S. state of Michigan. The lake encompasses 90.5 acres (36.6 ha). It is located entirely within Lyndon Township about five miles (8.0 km) northwest of the city of Chelsea along M-52. The lake is located within Waterloo State Recreation Area along the northeastern edge of the park's boundaries near Pinckney State Recreation Area.

== Geology ==
Green Lake is a shallow and marshy lake with an average depth of around 5 feet (1.5 m) and a maximum depth of 11 feet (3.4 m) in the southwestern portion. The lake sits at an elevation of 951 feet (290 m) above sea level.

The lake has no major inflows or outflows and receives most of its water source from groundwater and rainwater. The region contains numerous small lakes and streams. Green Lake is connected by a small unnamed stream to Long Lake to the north. Other smaller lakes within the vicinity of Green Lake include Winnewana Lake to the southwest. Hankard Lake is located to the west, and Clark Lake is to the north. Gorman Lake and Island Lake are located to the east.

== Activities ==
Located within a rural area of Waterloo State Recreation Area, Green Lake is accessible directly from M-52. Two hiking and biking trails travel along the lake. The 20-mile (32.2 km) Waterloo–DTE Energy Foundation Trail has its trailhead at the north end of Green Lake and includes the Green Lake Loop, which travels for 5.2 miles (8.4 km) through the forests around Green Lake. The Waterloo–Pinckney Trail travels along Green Lake and the campground. It runs much longer for 33.9 miles (54.6 km) and connects Waterloo State Recreation Area to Pinckney State Recreation Area.

The Green Lake Rustic Campground is a state-operated campground located along the southern end of Green Lake. The campground contains 25 campsites and a yurt. The campground does not have electricity or running water but does contain vault toilets and a hand pump for water. The campground also contains the only public access site for the lake—a small boat launch at the southeastern corner of the lake. The gravel boat launch is only suitable for small vessels, such as canoes and kayaks.

In 2020, the Border-to-Border Trail was extended to run along Green Lake parallel to M-52. This portion of the biking trail serves to better connect the recreation areas of Waterloo and Pinckney, as well as a route connecting the city of Chelsea to the village of Stockbridge to the north.

Green Lake is also a popular fishing destination. Common fish within the lake include bluegill, crappie, largemouth bass, smallmouth bass, and yellow perch.

== Images ==
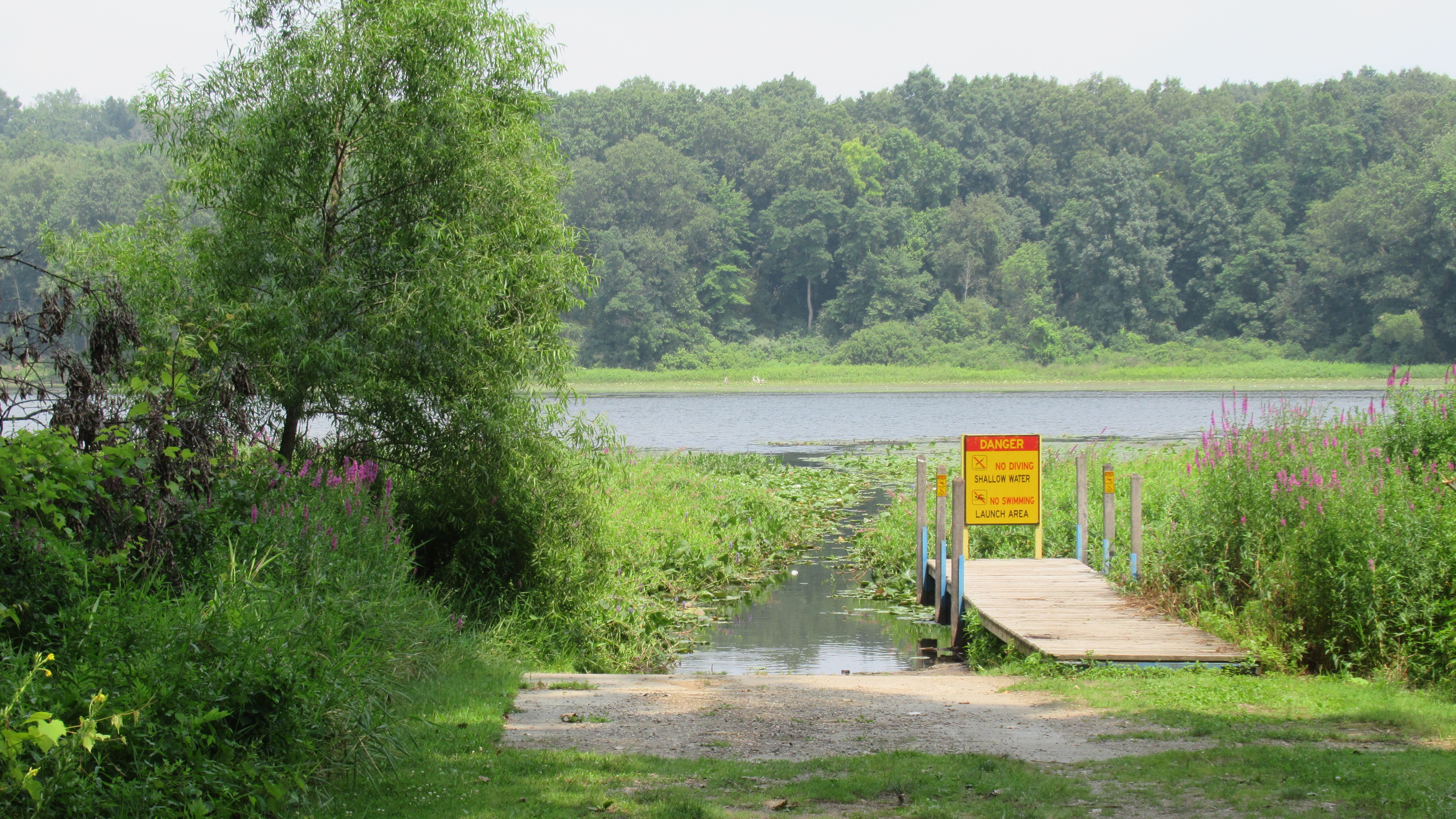
Public boating access site

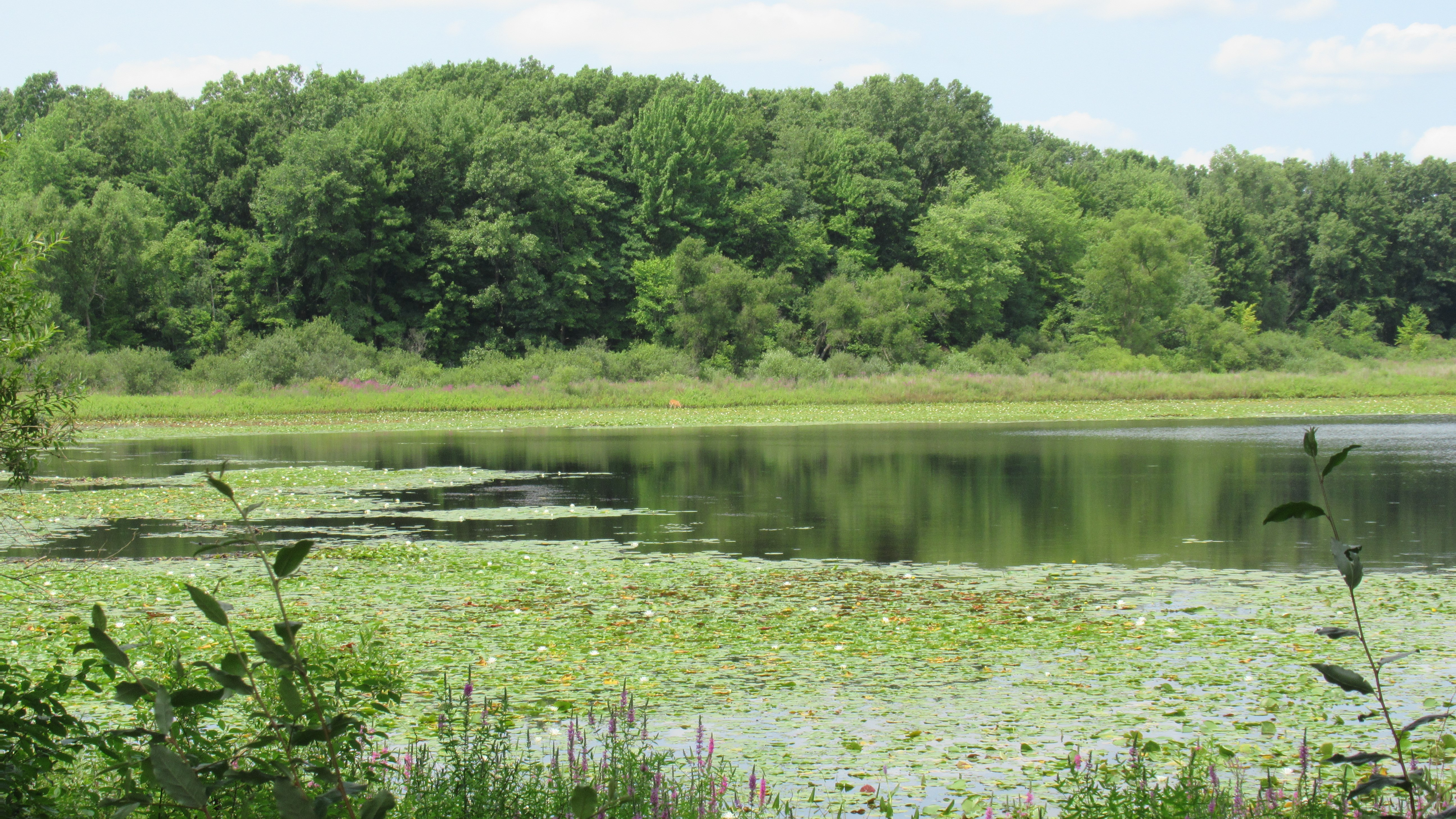
Southwest edge of Green Lake

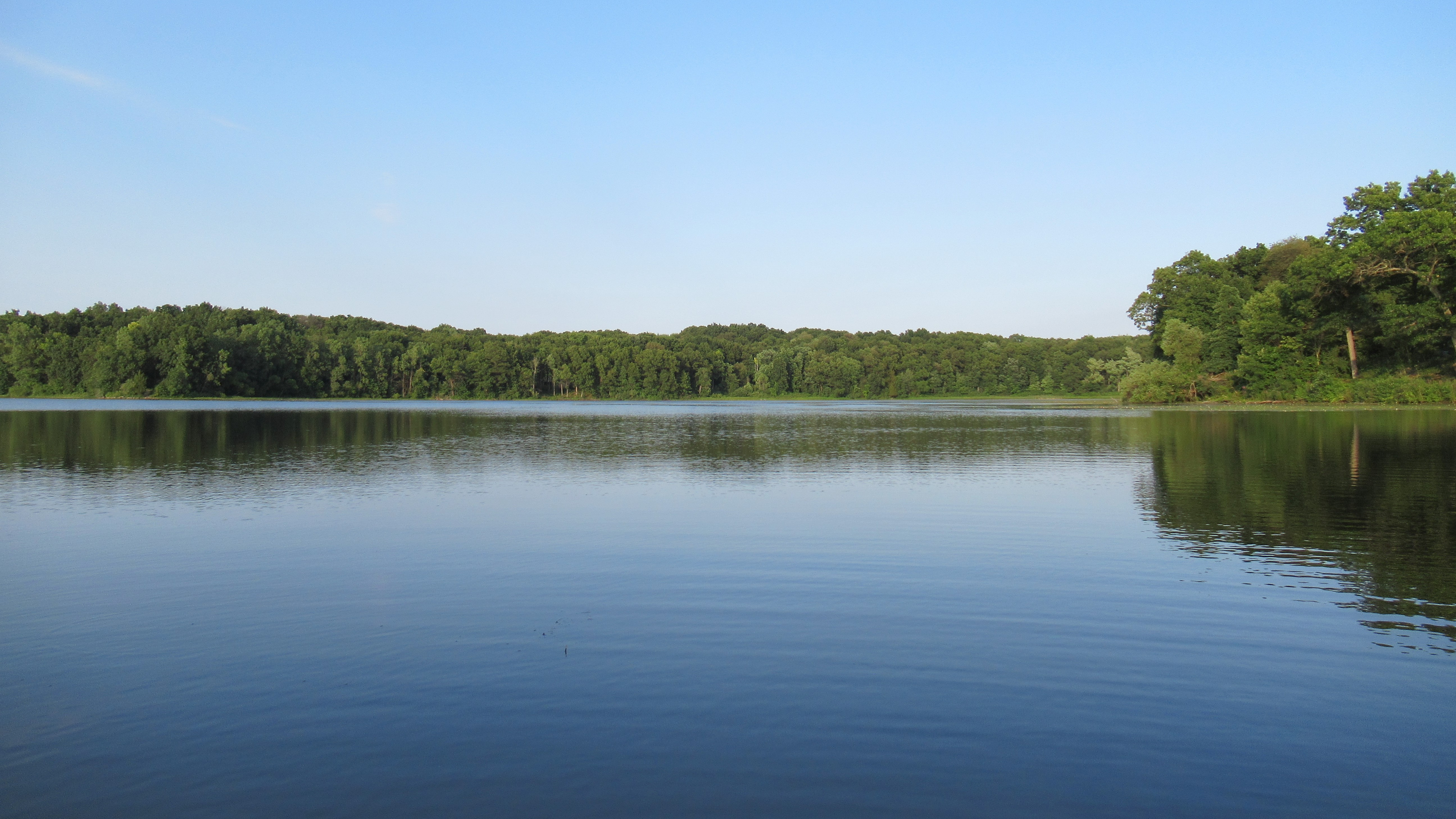
Southeast view of Green Lake

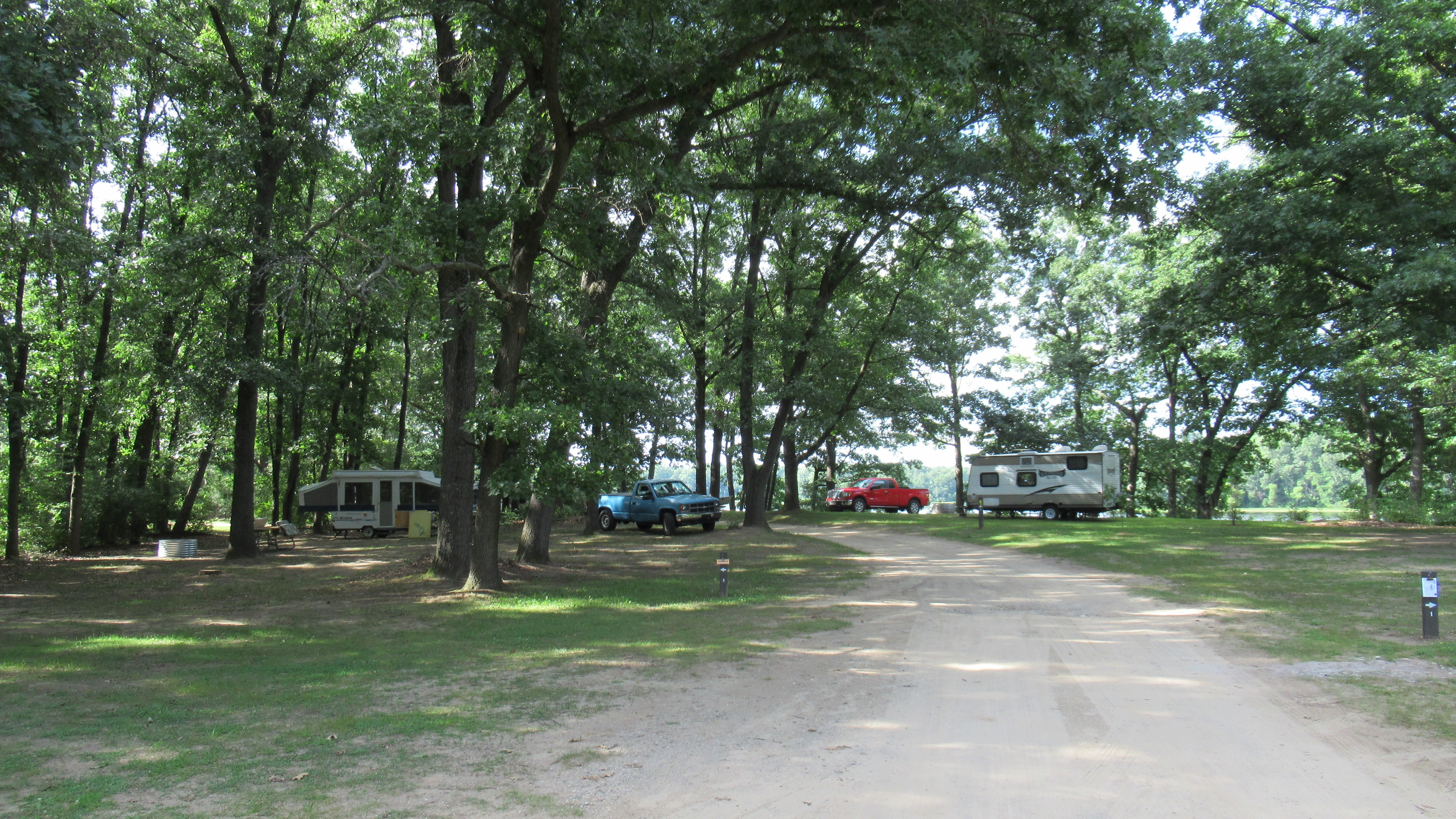
Rustic campground
