= Lyndon Township, Michigan =

- Civil township
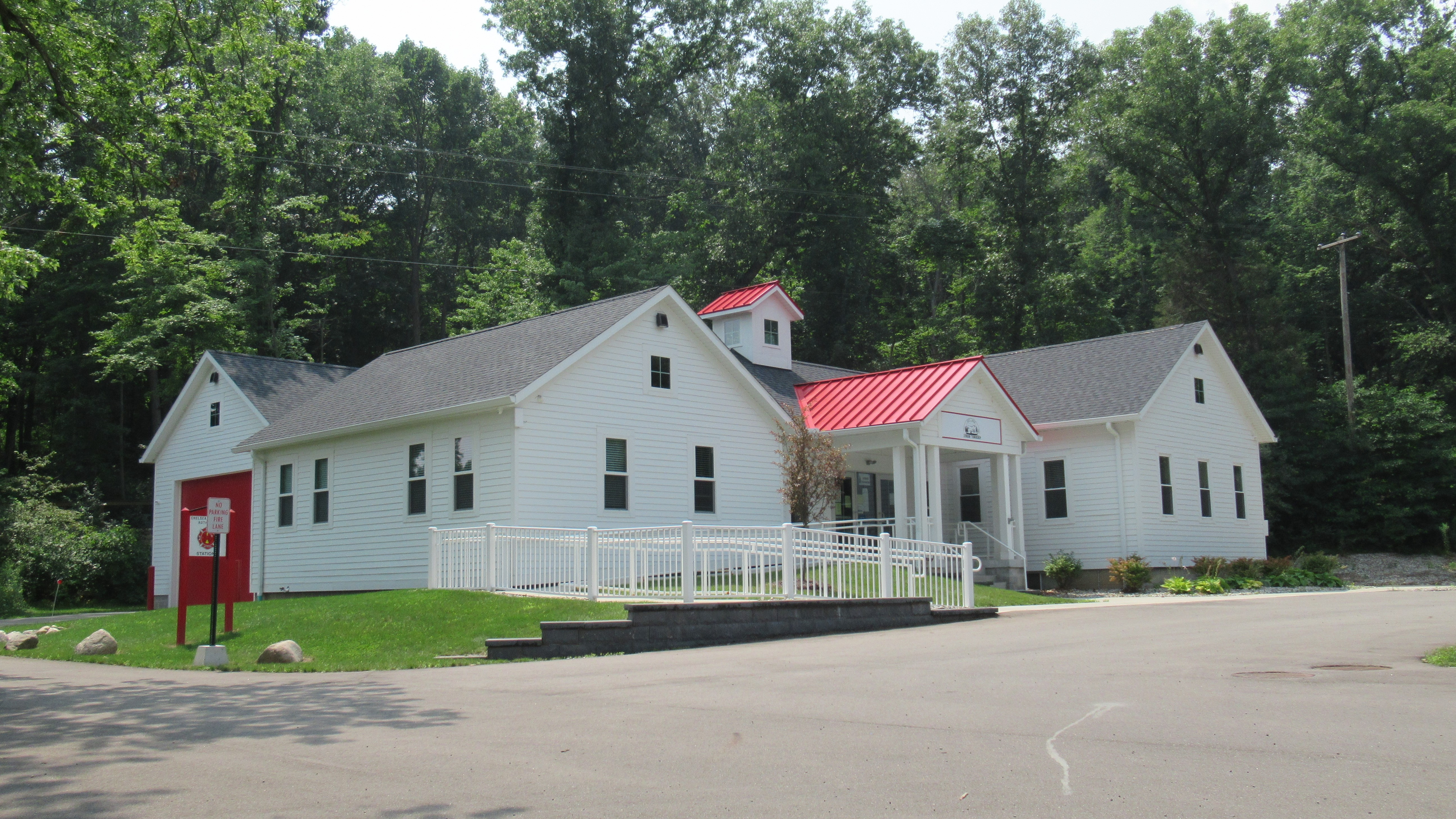
- Lyndon Township Hall and Fire Department

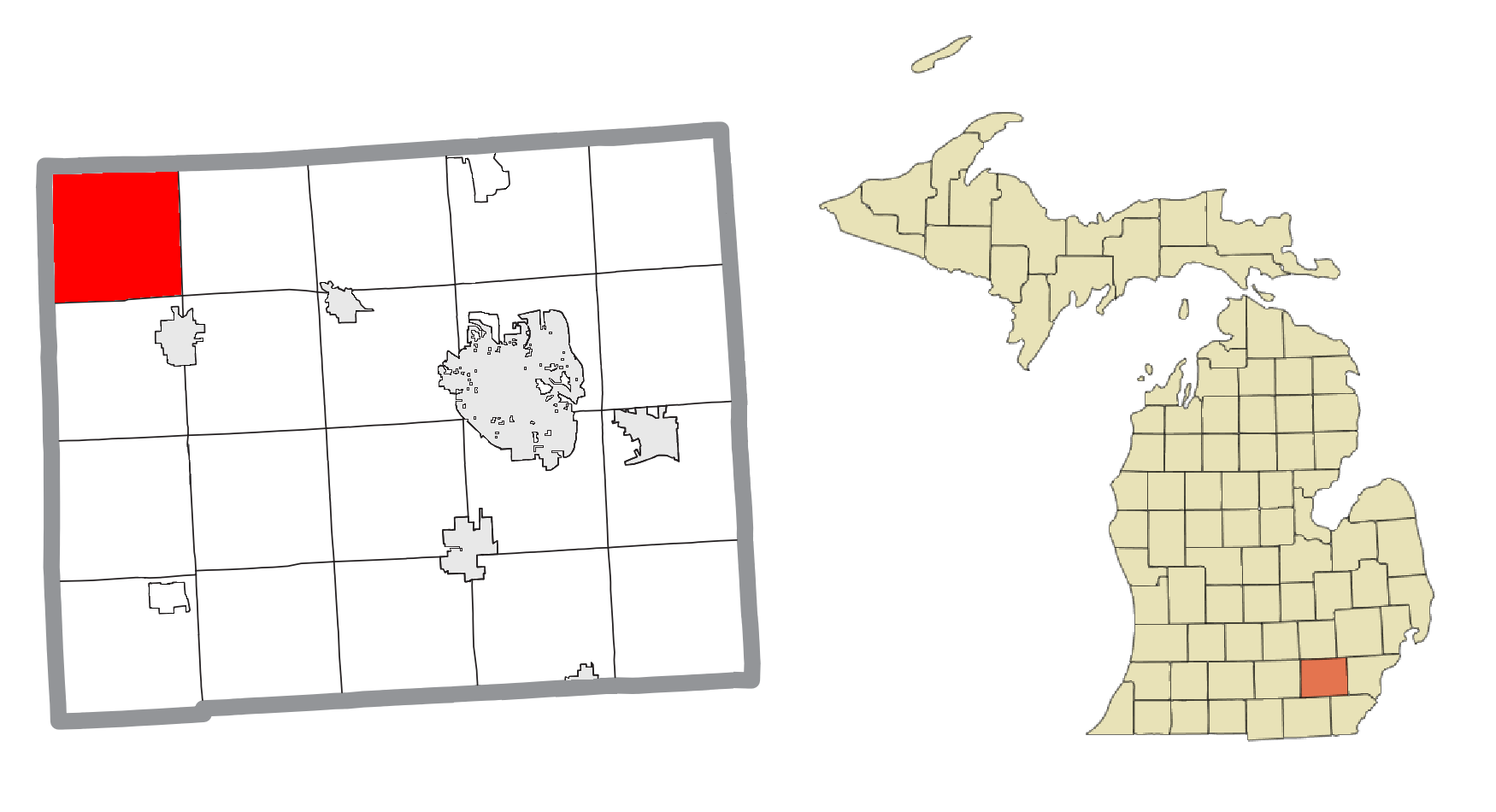
- Location within Washtenaw County

- Location within the state of Michigan Location within the United States
- Coordinates: 42°23′14″N 84°04′11″W
- Country: United States
- State: Michigan
- County: Washtenaw
- Established: 1836

Government
  - Supervisor: Pam Byrnes
  - Clerk: Linda Reilly

Area
  - Total: 35.10 sq mi (90.91 km^{2})
  - Land: 32.08 sq mi (83.09 km^{2})
  - Water: 3.02 sq mi (7.82 km^{2})
- Elevation: 1,014 ft (309 m)

Population (2020)
  - Total: 2,656
  - Density: 82.79/sq mi (31.97/km^{2})
- Time zone: UTC-5 (Eastern (EST))
  - Summer (DST): UTC-4 (EDT)
- ZIP code(s): 48118 (Chelsea); 48137 (Gregory); 49285 (Stockbridge)
- Area code: 734
- FIPS code: 26-49780
- GNIS feature ID: 1626648
- Website: Official website

Lyndon Township is a civil township of Washtenaw County in the U.S. state of Michigan. The population was 2,656 at the 2020 census.

== Communities ==
- Collins Plains is a former settlement named after brothers Josiah and Harrison Collins, who settled here in 1833.
- Iron Creek is a historic settlement located within the township. A post office operated in Iron Creek from February 8, 1840 until June 25, 1859.
- Lyndon Center is an unincorporated community located along M-52 within the center of the township at 42°22′53″N 84°04′59″W.

== Geography ==
The township is located in the northwest corner of Washtenaw County. According to the U.S. Census Bureau, the township has a total area of 35.10 square miles (90.91 km^{2}), of which 32.08 square miles (83.09 km^{2}) is land and 3.02 square miles (7.82 km^{2}) (8.60%) is water.

The township contains numerous lakes and also has the westernmost boundary of the Waterloo State Recreation Area, and Pinckney State Recreation Area has its western boundaries within the township. The Border-to-Border Trail runs through the township and has its western terminus near the township hall. A small southern portion of the Unadilla State Wildlife Area extends into Lyndon Township.

=== Major highways ===
- M-52 (Stockbridge Chelsea Road) runs diagonally southeast–northwest through the township.

== Demographics ==
At the 2000 census, there were 2,728 people, 877 households and 697 families residing in the township. The population density was 85.1 inhabitants per square mile (32.9/km^{2}). There were 1,055 housing units at an average density of 32.9 per square mile (12.7/km^{2}). The racial makeup of the township was 89.85% White, 6.12% African American, 1.17% Native American, 0.33% Asian, 1.28% from other races, and 1.25% from two or more races. Hispanic or Latino of any race were 2.49% of the population.

There were 877 households, of which 35.8% had children under the age of 18 living with them, 70.4% were married couples living together, 5.7% had a female householder with no husband present, and 20.5% were non-families. 17.8% of all households were made up of individuals, and 4.2% had someone living alone who was 65 years of age or older. The average household size was 2.72 and the average family size was 3.07.

23.6% of the population were under the age of 18, 14.2% from 18 to 24, 29.0% from 25 to 44, 26.2% from 45 to 64, and 7.0% who were 65 years of age or older. The median age was 36 years. For every 100 females, there were 131.4 males. For every 100 females age 18 and over, there were 141.6 males.

The median household income was $71,595 and the median family income was $77,326. Males had a median income of $48,372 and females $30,054. The per capita income was $26,297. About 0.6% of families and 1.8% of the population were below the poverty line, including 1.3% of those under age 18 and none of those age 65 or over.

== Education ==
Lyndon Township is served by two public school districts. The majority of the township is served by Chelsea School District to the southeast in Chelsea. Small portions of the northern portion of the township are served by Stockbridge Community Schools to the northeast in Stockbridge in Ingham County.

== Images ==
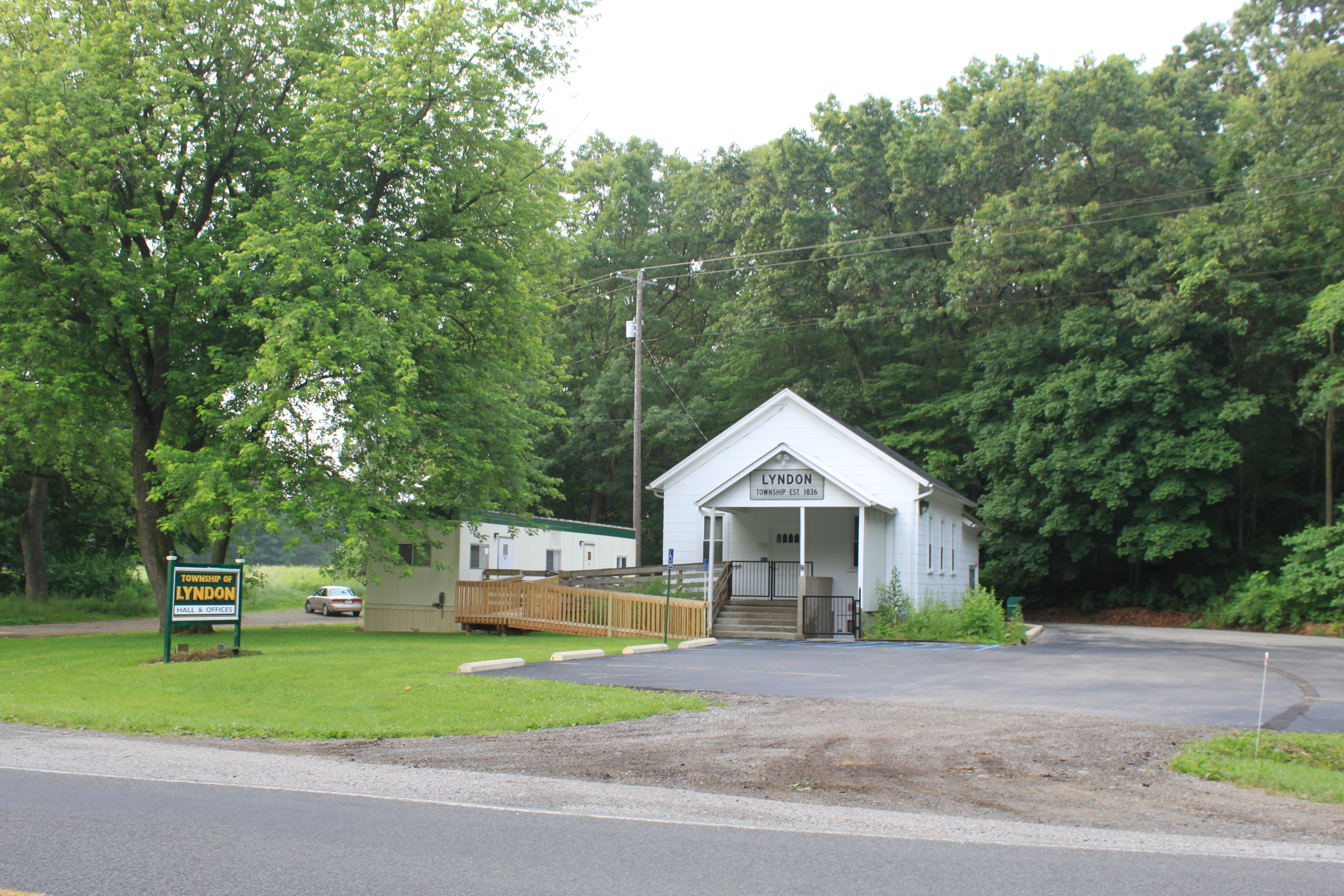
Former Lyndon Township Hall

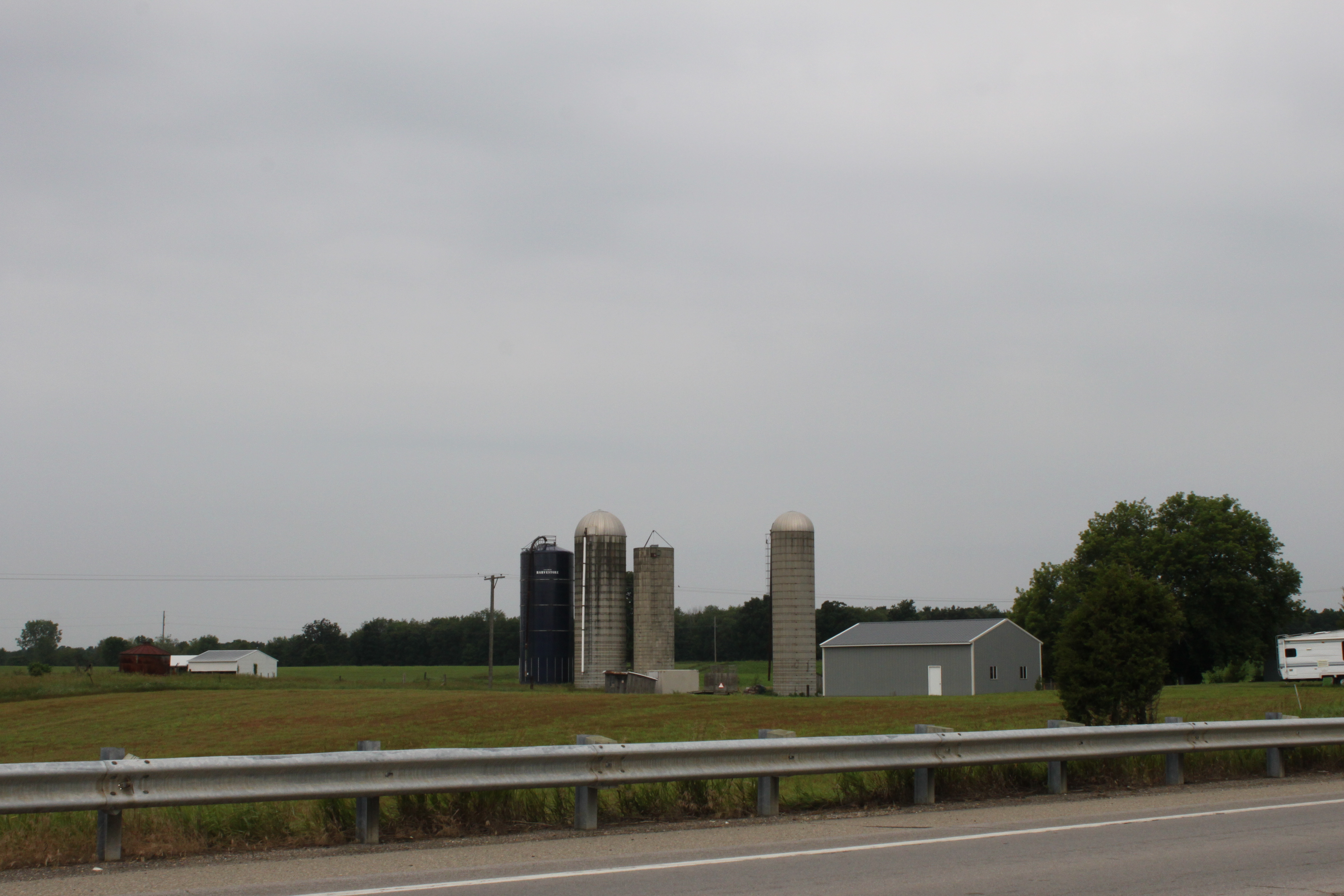
Farmland on N. Territorial Road

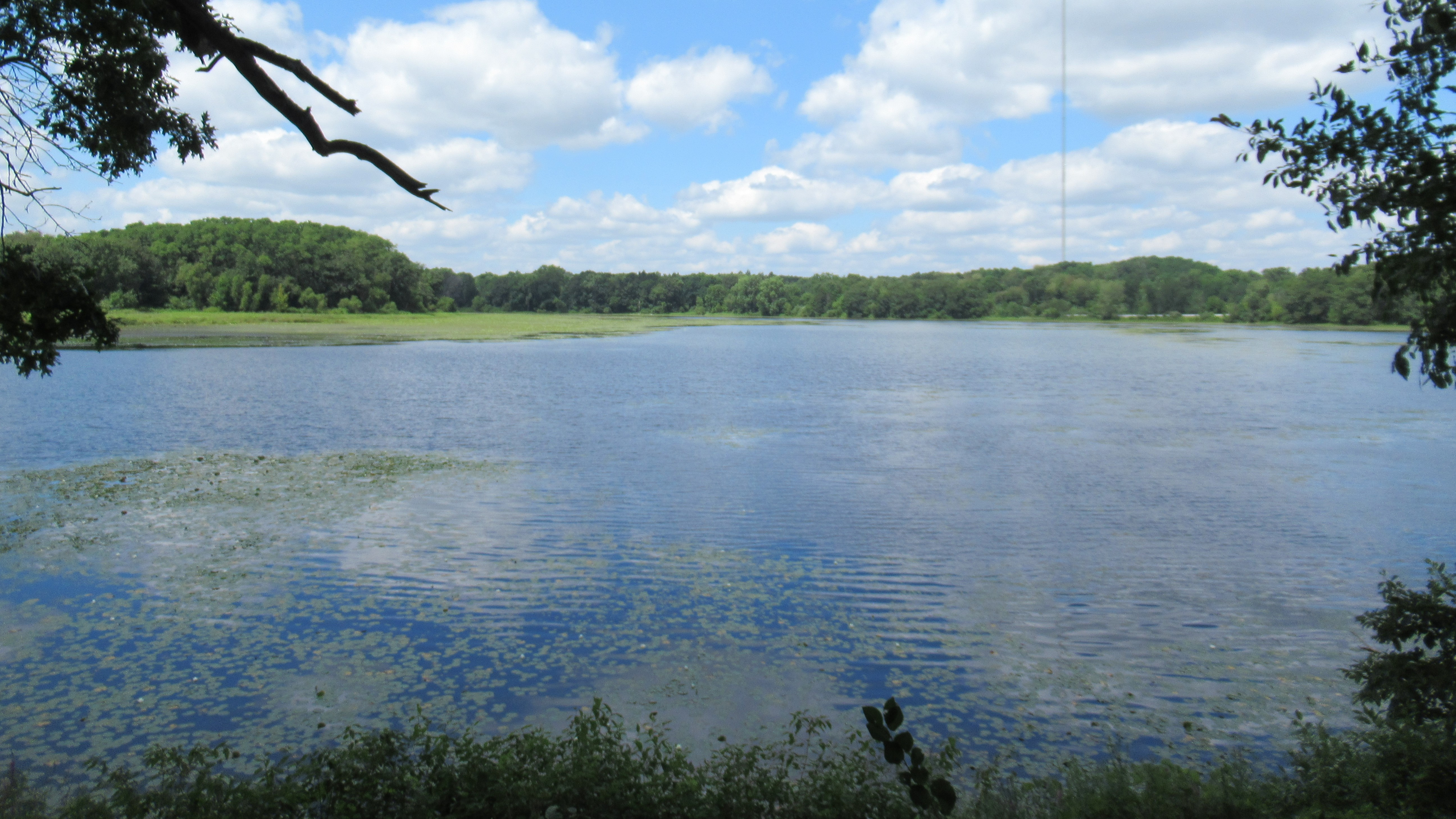
Green Lake
