= Recreation area =

Protected area zoned for recreational use

A recreational area, alternatively called a recreation area, is a type of protected area (possibly by municipal zoning in some jurisdictions), that is designated solely for recreational activities.

Such leisure areas could be parkland, forested areas, beaches, hiking or walking trails, and the like.

== By country ==
=== Canada ===
In the province of British Columbia, recreation areas are lands set aside for recreational use. These lands are also being evaluated to determine whether the area should be "upgraded" to full protected area status, or returned to integrated resource management lands.

=== South Africa ===
==== Cape Town ====
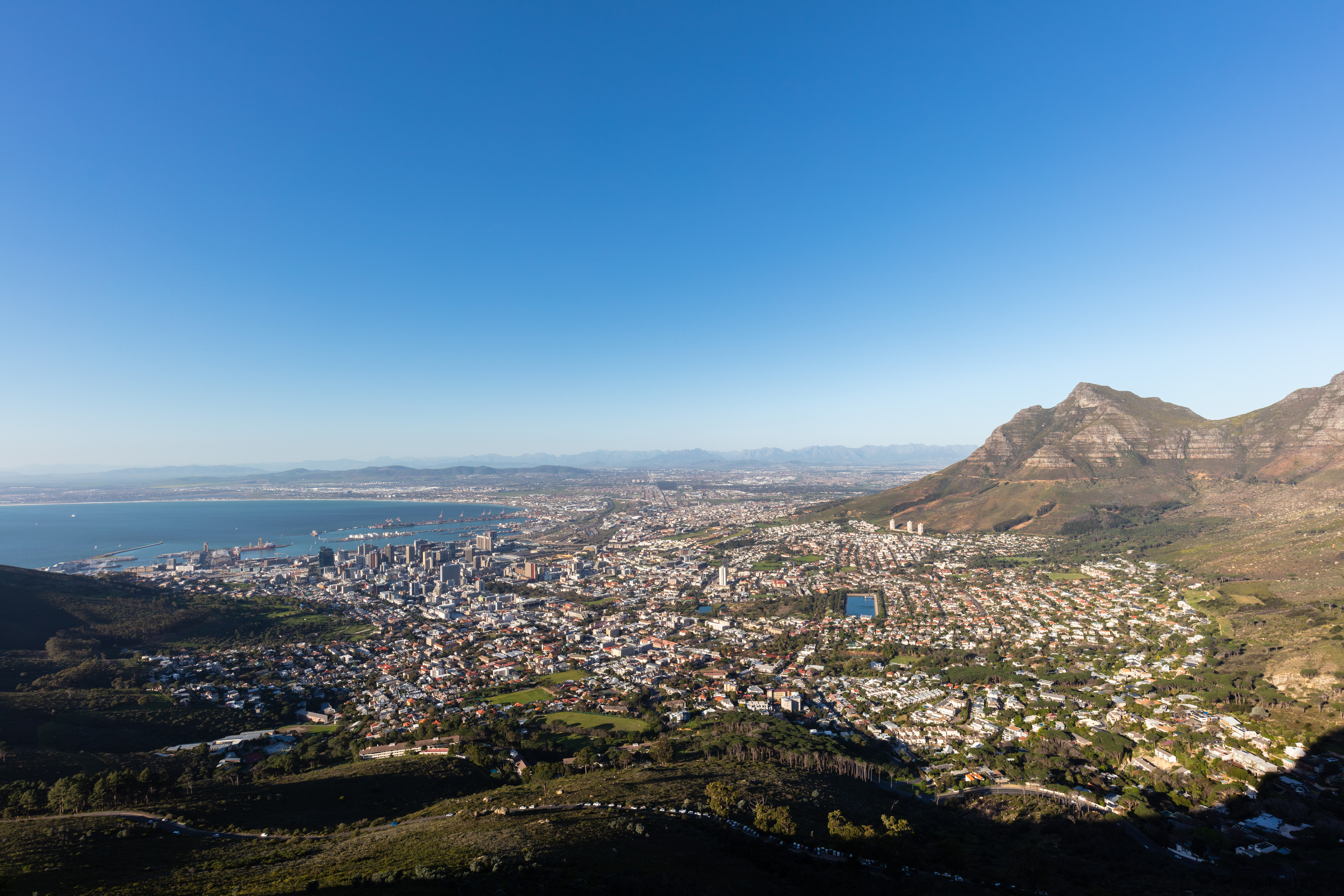
National parks in and around Cape Town are managed by the national body SANParks.

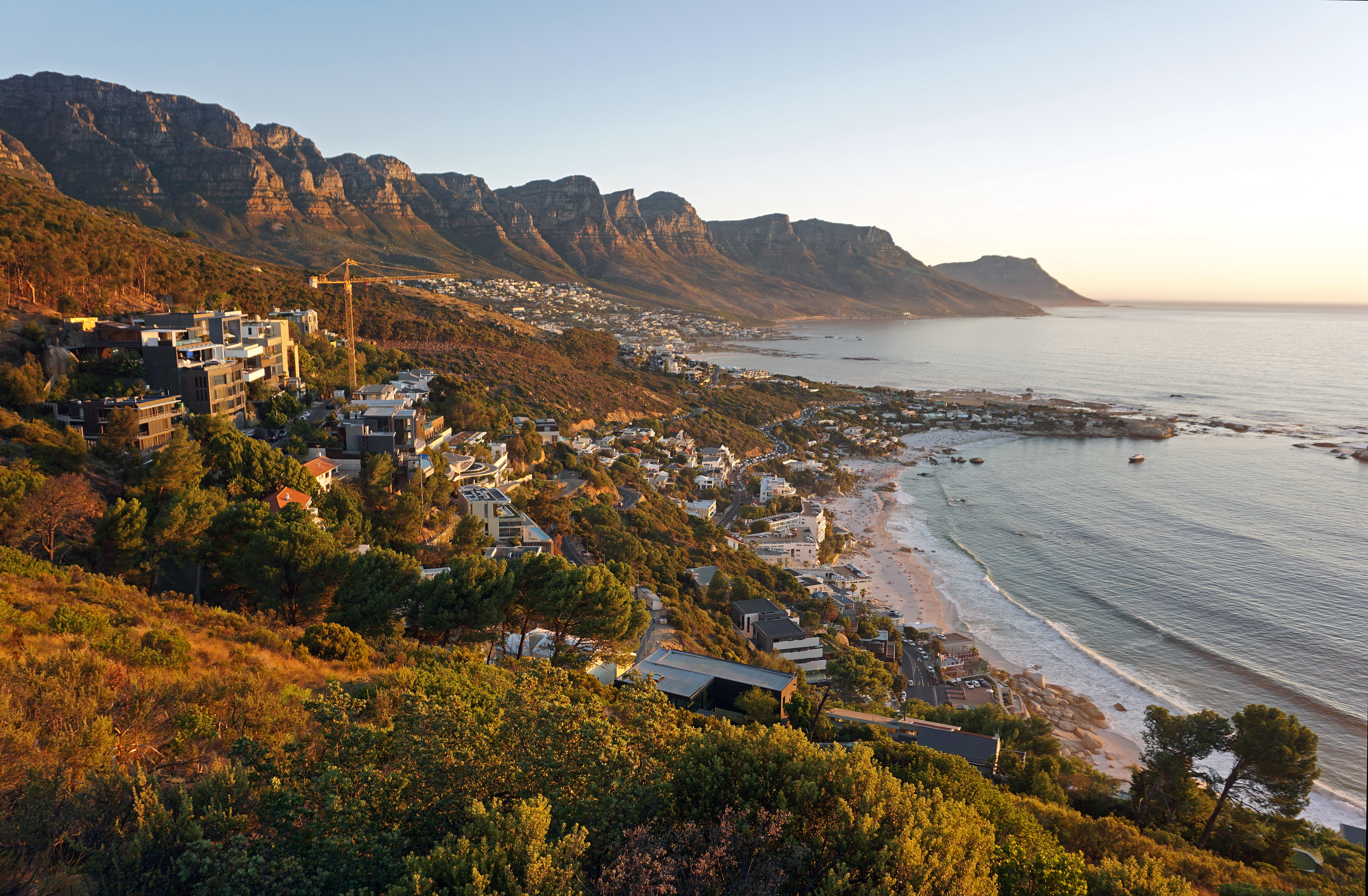
Beaches along Cape Town's coastline are zoned for recreation exclusively, and are maintained by the City of Cape Town metro government.

Cape Town, one of SA's capital cities, and its second-largest by population, is known for its abundance of nature reserves and green spaces throughout and surrounding the city. These large, specially-zoned regions serve as free-to-access public spaces for residents to enjoy leisure time in. The city has around 5,000 hectares of green space that the city encourages residents to explore.

The City of Cape Town (metro government), and private developers, have also implemented a number of elements of green infrastructure in new builds and redevelopments throughout the city, adding to the existing natural flora.

=== United States ===
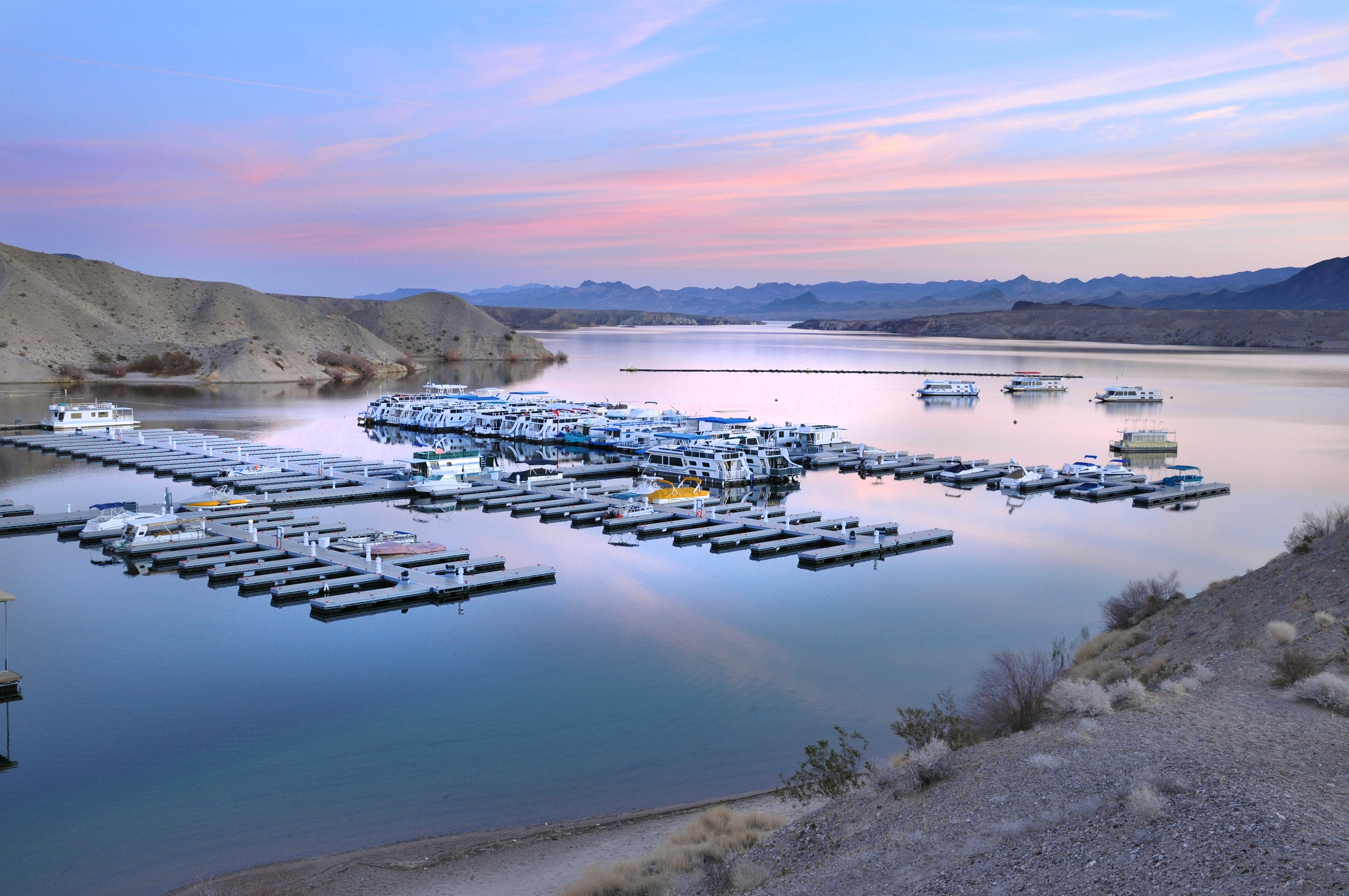
Lake Mead National Recreation Area in the United States is an example of a recreation area.

In the United States, National Recreation Areas are administered by several different agencies. They typically do not meet the strict guidelines to become national parks.

In U.S. state park systems, recreation areas may also fail to meet some criteria to be designated state parks, such as having multiple non-contiguous properties. Size is not necessarily a defining criterion. For instance, in Michigan, the largest state recreation area, Waterloo Recreation Area is 20,500-acre (83 km^{2}) while the smallest state park is 31-acre (0.13 km^{2}) Tri-Centennial State Park and Harbor.
