= Hell, Michigan =

- Unincorporated community
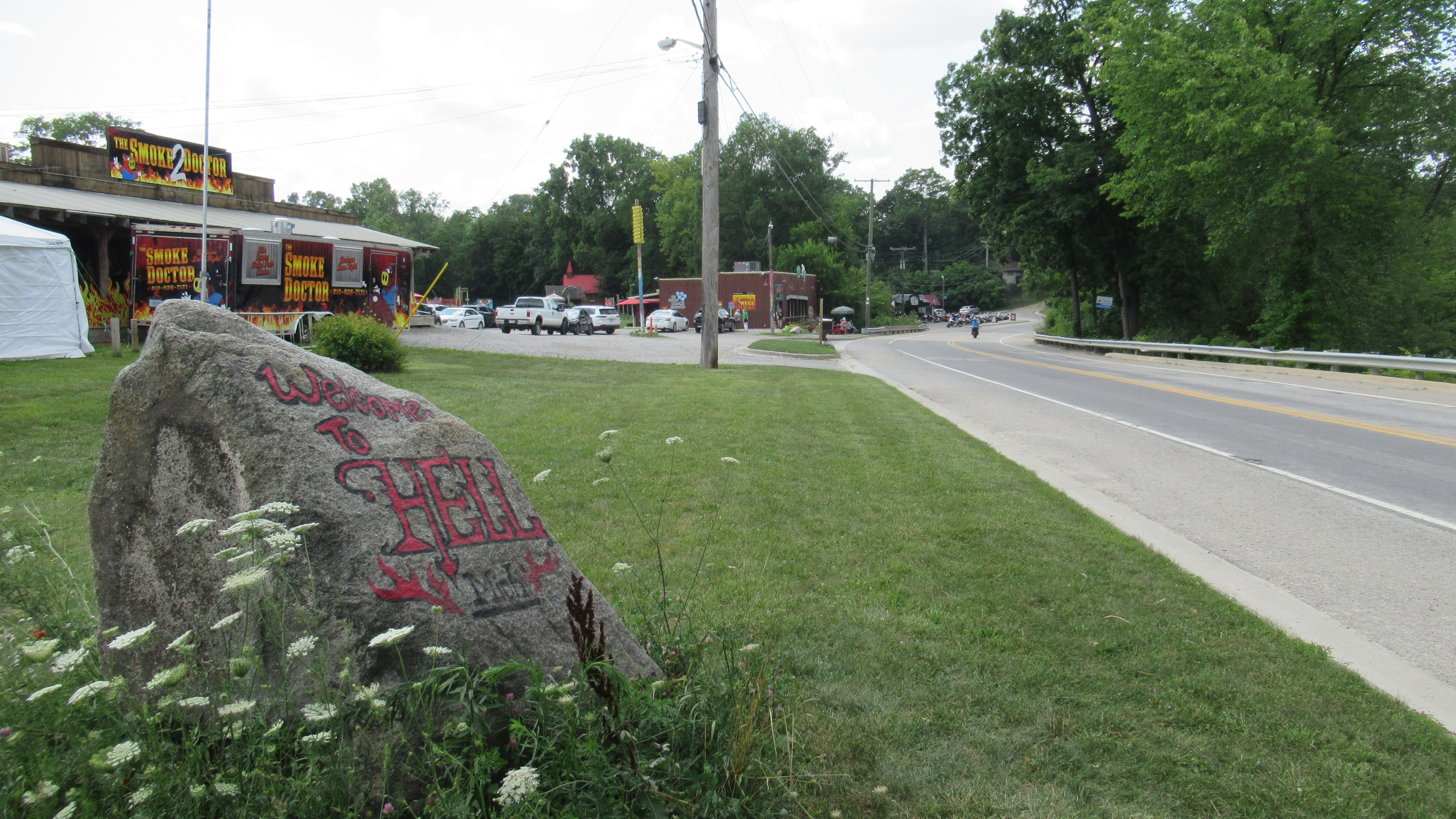
- Looking west along Patterson Lake Road (D-32)

- Location within the state of Michigan Location within the United States
- Coordinates: 42°26′05″N 83°59′06″W
- Country: United States
- State: Michigan
- County: Livingston
- Township: Putnam
- Elevation: 890 ft (270 m)
- Time zone: UTC-5 (Eastern (EST))
  - Summer (DST): UTC-4 (EDT)
- ZIP code(s): 48169 (Pinckney)
- Area code: 734
- FIPS code: 26-37520
- GNIS feature ID: 628065

Hell is an unincorporated community in Livingston County in the U.S. state of Michigan. The community is located within Putnam Township along Patterson Lake Road (D-32) about 15 miles (24 km) northwest of Ann Arbor and 3 miles (4.8 km) southwest of Pinckney. As an unincorporated community, Hell has no legally defined boundaries or official population statistics of its own, although a journalist found 76 residents in 2012. It is served by the Pinckney 48169 ZIP Code.

== Geography ==
Hell is in Putnam Township, Livingston County, and about 11 miles (18 km) south of Howell, the county seat. Based on satellite views, the area is heavily forested, with some fields west and east of town. Hell's business district is centered along Patterson Lake Road about 15 miles (24 km) northwest of Ann Arbor, about 35 miles (56 km) southeast of Lansing, 42 miles (68 km) south-southwest of Flint, and 48 miles (77 km) west-northwest of Detroit.

== History ==
Hell developed around a sawmill, gristmill, distillery and tavern. All four were operated by George Reeves, who moved to the area in the 1830s from the Catskill Mountains in New York. He purchased a sawmill on what is now known as Hell Creek in 1841. In addition to the sawmill, Reeves purchased 1,000 acres (400 ha) of land surrounding the mill. Reeves then built a gristmill on Hell Creek which was powered by water that was impounded by a small dam across the creek. Farmers in the area were quite successful in growing wheat and had an abundance of grain. Reeves opened a distillery to process the excess grain into whiskey. Reeves also opened a general store/tavern on his property.

The tavern and distillery soon became a thriving business for Reeves. He built a ballroom on the second floor of the establishment and a sulky racetrack around his millpond. Reeves also sold his alcohol to nearby roadhouses and stores for as little as ten cents a gallon. His operation came under the scrutiny of the U.S. government in the years after the American Civil War. When tax collectors came to Hell to assess his operation, Reeves and his customers conspired to hide the whiskey by filling barrels and sinking them to the bottom of the millpond. When the government agents left the area, the barrels were hauled to the surface with ropes. As Reeves aged, he slowed his business ventures, closing the distillery and witnessing the burning of the gristmill. He died in 1877.

Reeves' family sold the land to a group of investors from Detroit in 1924. The investors increased the size of the millpond by raising the level of the dam, creating what is now Hiland Lake. The area soon became a summer resort area, attracting visitors for swimming and fishing. Henry Ford considered building some manufacturing facilities in the area but decided against it.

== Etymology ==
Hell has been noted on a list of unusual place names. There are a number of theories for the origin of Hell's name. The first is that a pair of German travelers stepped out of a stagecoach one sunny afternoon in the 1830s, and one said to the other: "So schön hell!" ('So beautifully bright!'). Their comments were overheard by some locals and the name stuck. The second theory is tied to the "hell-like" conditions, including mosquitos, thick forest cover, and extensive wetlands, encountered by early explorers. A third theory is that George Reeves's habit of paying the local farmers for their grain with home distilled whiskey led many wives to comment "He's gone to Hell again" when questioned about their husband's whereabouts during harvest time. A fourth is that soon after Michigan gained statehood, Reeves was asked what he thought the town he helped settle should be called and replied "I don't care. You can name it Hell for all I care." The name became official on October 13, 1841.

== Culture ==
In the early 1930s, Pinckney, Michigan, postmaster W. C. Miller began to receive requests from stamp and postmark collectors for cancellations: Hell had no post office, instead being served by the one for Pinckney, three miles away. On July 15, 1961, a postal substation was established at Hell, operating from May 1 through September 30. It remains at the back of the general store, although the United States Postal Service does not recognize Hell as a town; it instead uses the name of nearby Pinckney as the mailing address.

In 1963, the Hell Chamber of Commerce sponsored a two-day "fun festival" which began with Satan's arrival by helicopter at "Satan's Hills", a local housing development.

The community experiences freezing temperatures each winter, leading to comparisons with the phrase when hell freezes over.

== Education ==
The Pinckney Community Schools serve Hell. The schools are Pinckney Community High School, Pathfinder Middle School, Farley Hill Elementary, and Navigator Elementary.

== See also ==
- Hell, Norway
- List of places with unusual names
