= Pinckney State Recreation Area =

Michigan state recreation area

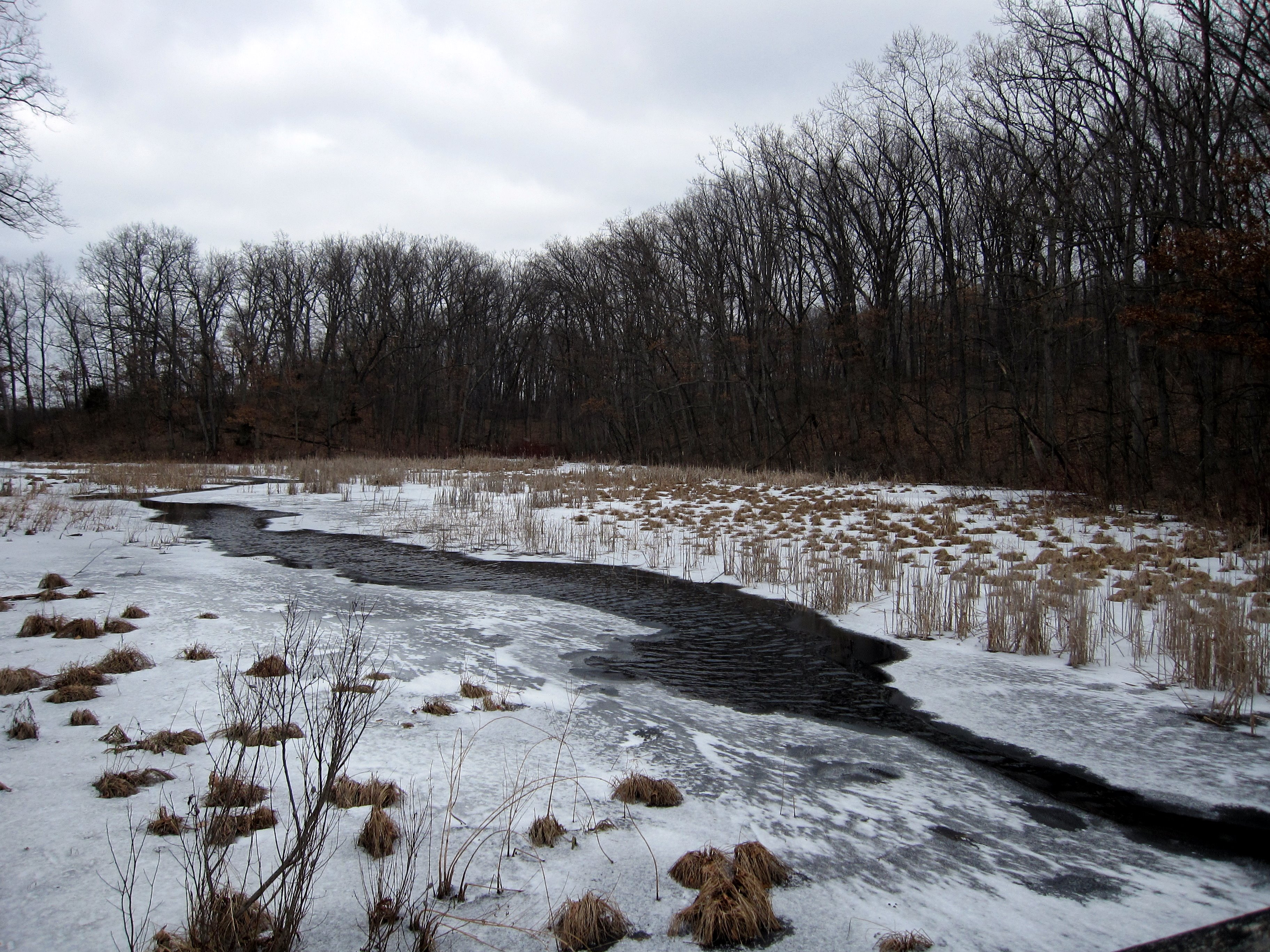
- Pinckney State Recreation Area in winter

- Location within Michigan Location within the United States
- Location: Lower Peninsula, Livingston County, Washtenaw County, Michigan USA
- Nearest city: Pinckney, Michigan
- Coordinates: 42°25′34″N 83°58′15″W
- Area: 17.2 mi^{2} (27.7 km^{2})
- Established: 1944
- Governing body: Michigan Department of Natural Resources
- Website: Official website

Pinckney State Recreation Area is a Michigan state recreation area in Dexter, Sylvan and Lyndon Townships, Washtenaw County and Putnam and Unadilla Townships, Livingston County in the U.S. state of Michigan. The park is 11,000 acres (4,500 ha) and sits at an elevation of 922 feet (281 m). The park is connected to the nearby Waterloo State Recreation Area by the 35-mile (56 km) Waterloo–Pinckney Trail. Pinckney State Recreation Area is open for year-round recreation including hiking, fishing, swimming, hunting and a variety of winter sports.

== History ==
Pinckney State Recreation Area comprises several connected, but scattered parcels of land that surround private lands and land owned by the State of Michigan. The village of Pinckney is the largest settlement in the area, lying just to the east of the northeast corner of the park. Hell lies within the park and is the center of recreation at Pinckney State Recreation Area.

Hell grew up around a sawmill, gristmill, distillery and tavern. All three were operated by George Reeves. Reeves moved to the area in the 1830s from the Catskill Mountains in New York. He purchased a sawmill on what is now known as Hell Creek in 1841. Reeves' family sold the land to a group of investors from Detroit in 1924. The investors increased the size of the millpond by raising the level of the dam creating what is now Hiland Lake. The area soon became a summer resort area attracting visitors for swimming and fishing. Henry Ford considered building some manufacturing facilities in the area but decided against it. Just west of the present Pinckney park, the federal government had developed the Waterloo recreational demonstration project in the 1930s and the state acquired the lease of that area in 1943. The next year, the Michigan Legislature appropriated monies for the purchasing of land in southeastern Michigan and for the construction of state parks. The park grew through the 1940s and 1950s with money from a number of sources.

== Geology ==
The area is covered with glacial moraines, kettle lakes, and swampy lowlands. Much of the area is open grasslands of abandoned agricultural fields with some oak forests on hilly areas with shrub swamps remaining in lowlands. Over 20 lakes, the largest at about 200 acres (81 ha), are in the park. The area is in the Grand River and Huron River watersheds. The highest elevation is Stofer Hill at 1,150 feet (350 m). The previous description regarding open grasslands is out of date and although true 40 years ago, most of the area has now grown back with young woodlands.

== Ecology ==
The vegetation in Pinckney prior to European settlement consisted of mixed oak forests in upland areas, and wetland communities surrounding lakes, most commonly wet prairie, conifer swamp and hardwood swamp.

Most of the forested areas in Pinckney are on land too steep or deemed otherwise unsuitable for agriculture. The stands that remain are smaller than 100 acres (40 ha) and consist of deciduous trees, like white oak, red oak, black oak and hickory. Most of the flatter terrain consists of old fields dominated by non-native plants like knapweed, quack grass, timothy-grass, and white sweet clover, with native plants present too, including tall goldenrod, hairy aster, black-eyed susan, common cinquefoil, and wild strawberry. Other plants found in Pinckney, like the white lady's-slipper and rosepink, are classified as "threatened" and are protected under Michigan law. Other species found in the park, like English sundew, are classified as "special concern."

Mammals found in Pinckney are typical of the region and include white-tailed deer, raccoons, and Virginia opossums. Typical avian species consist of various water birds such as blue-winged teals, snow and Canada geese, mallard and wood ducks, egrets, and great blue herons. Pinckney is also known by birders as a habitat for sandhill cranes. In the last few years, Beavers have returned to the area especially the west end of Hiland Lake but also Gosling Lake and Crooked Lake. Loons can be seen in the spring and fall in Dead Lake and some years in Hiland Lake. Trumpeter swans also in the west end of Hiland Lake in the winter.

== Recreation ==
Pinckney State Recreation Area is home to several campgrounds and many miles of hiking trails. Bruin Lake Modern Campground has 186 modern campsites. Electric service for recreational vehicles is provided along with modern restrooms. Other facilities at the campground include a boat launch, fishing and swimming areas and a playground. Blind Lake Rustic Campground has ten rustic campsites with vault toilets. This campground is a hike-in camping area. Crooked Lake Campground is also a rustic campsite with 12 camping areas. Additionally, one yurt and one cabin are available to rent at the park.

Silver Lake is a center of park activities with swimming beach on the lake as well as access to a number of trails including the 17-mile (27 km) Potawatomi mountain bike trail. The 35-mile (56 km) Waterloo-Pinckney Hiking Trail runs through the two parks (passing through Park Lyndon County Park between them). The park is also open to hunting, fishing, wildlife viewing, picnicking and boating.

=== Trails ===
Crooked Lake Trail is a 5-mile-long (8.0 km) trail that is open to hiking, mountain biking and cross-country skiing.
Equestrian Trail is an 8-mile (13 km) equestrian trail. Horses are available at Hell Creek Corral, a private business near the park.
Losee Lake Trail is a 3.3-mile (5.3 km) hiking-only trail.
Potawatomi Trail is a 17-mile (27 km) trail that is open to hiking, cross-country skiing and mountain biking and provides access to the two rustic camping areas and the yurt at Glenbrook.
Silver Lake Trail is a 2-mile-long (3.2 km) trail that is open to hiking, mountain biking and cross-country skiing.
Waterloo–Pinckney Trail is a 35-mile (56 km) hiking trail which runs through Waterloo Recreation Area and Pinckney Recreation Area. The trail passes through glacial features such as eskers and kettle lakes and through swamps and open meadows remaining from fallow farms. Forest types include oak and pine. The trail was first developed in the 1960s and the last link across the county park was completed in 1986.

=== Lakes ===
Pickney Recreation Area hosts several lakes open for recreation.

Silver Lake is not too far from the headquarters and is open to swimming, fishing, and boating.
Crooked Lake has a boat launch and is adjacent a rustic campground. It is not open to swimming.
Halfmoon Lake has a large swimming area, as well as a boat launch. Halfmoon Lake Day Use closes November 1 and opens April 1.
Pickerel Lake no longer offers a boat launch, and was considered an unofficial nude beach/swimming area until about 1990. It now offers a swimming area, and no motor watercraft are allowed on the lake. Some consider it one of the best swimming lakes in the state, but it does not have much of a beach. Lake is sand bottomed. Floats are a common sight. Lake is about 56 feet (17 m) deep at its deepest with many fish and turtles including snappers which don't seem to bother anyone. Very natural setting with no man-made development visible around the lake.

== Sources ==
- "Pinckney Recreation Area" (PDF). Supporting Analysis. Michigan Department of Natural Resources.
