= Waterloo-Pinckney Trail =

Recreational trail in Michigan, United States

Coordinates: 42.40066°N 84.04223°W

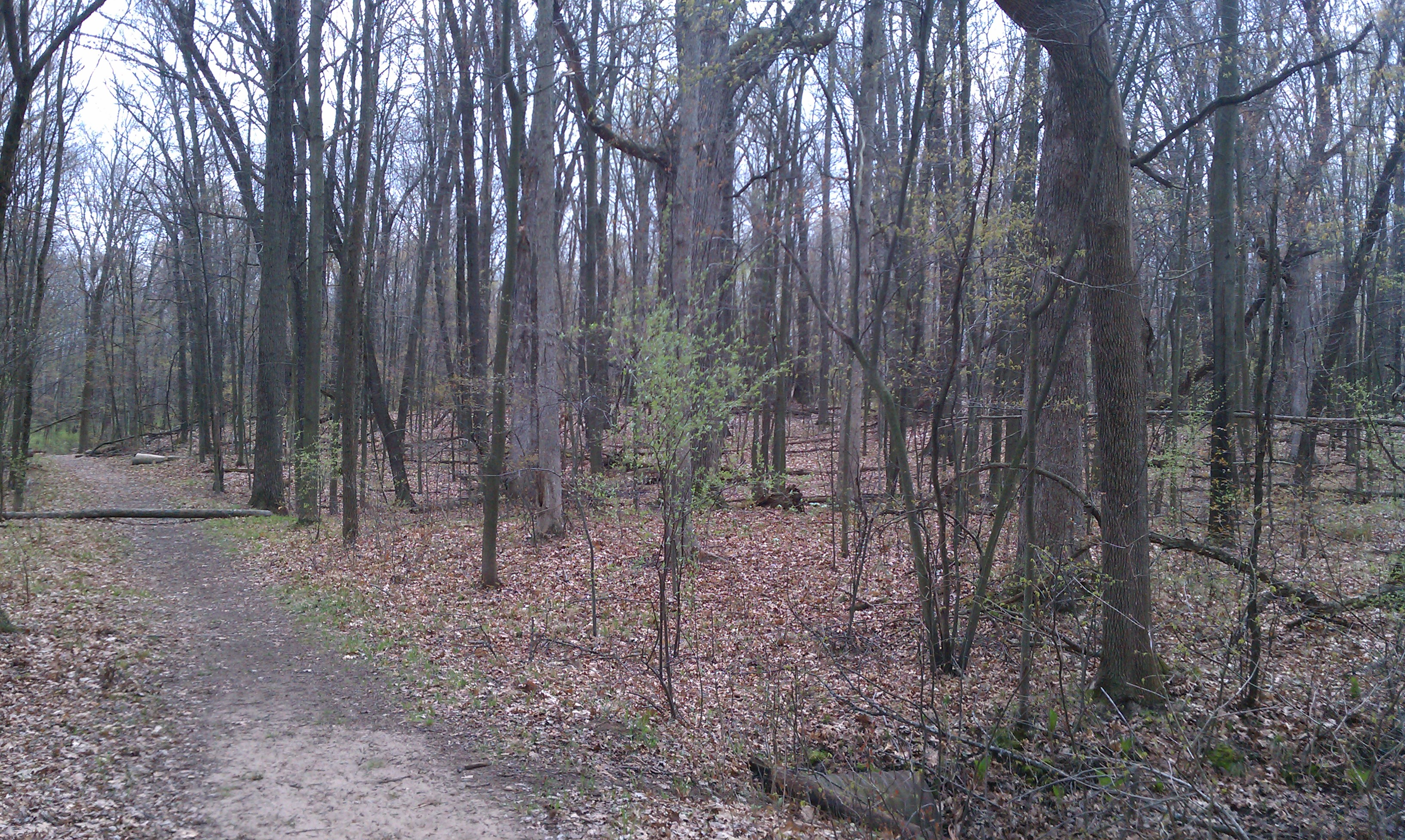
- Length: 36 mi (58 km)
- Location: Jackson / Washtenaw counties, Michigan, USA
- Trailheads: Portage Lake, Michigan; Silver Lake, Michigan
- Use: Hiking, some sections- Horseback riding, Bicycling
- Difficulty: Moderate
- Sights: Diverse environmental, glacial-formed landscape, and wetlands of the Lower Peninsula of southern Michigan, United States.

The Waterloo-Pinckney Trail is a 38-mile-long hiking trail which runs through Waterloo State Recreation Area and Pinckney Recreation Area in southeastern Michigan, United States. Part of the trail also passes through Park Lyndon County Park. The trail travels through glacial features such as eskers and kettle lakes as well as swamps and open meadows remaining from abandoned farmlands. Forest types include oak and pine. The trail tops out at 1,128 feet (344 m) on Sackrider Hill, 208 feet (63 m) above surroundings, the largest elevation gain. Other hills and ridges give 50-to-150-foot (15 to 46 m) rises. The trail is blazed with blue triangles and at some points shares trails with the Potawatomi Trail and the nature trails around the Eddy Discovery Center. Part of the trail is open to mountain biking and horseriding and hunting is allowed in most areas along the trail. The trail has several nearby campgrounds allowing it to be hiked as a 2, 3 or 4 day trip. Side trails to the campgrounds make the entire trip 40.5 miles (65.2 km). The trail was first developed in the 1960s and the last link across the county park was completed in 1986.
