= Putnam Township, Michigan =

- Civil township
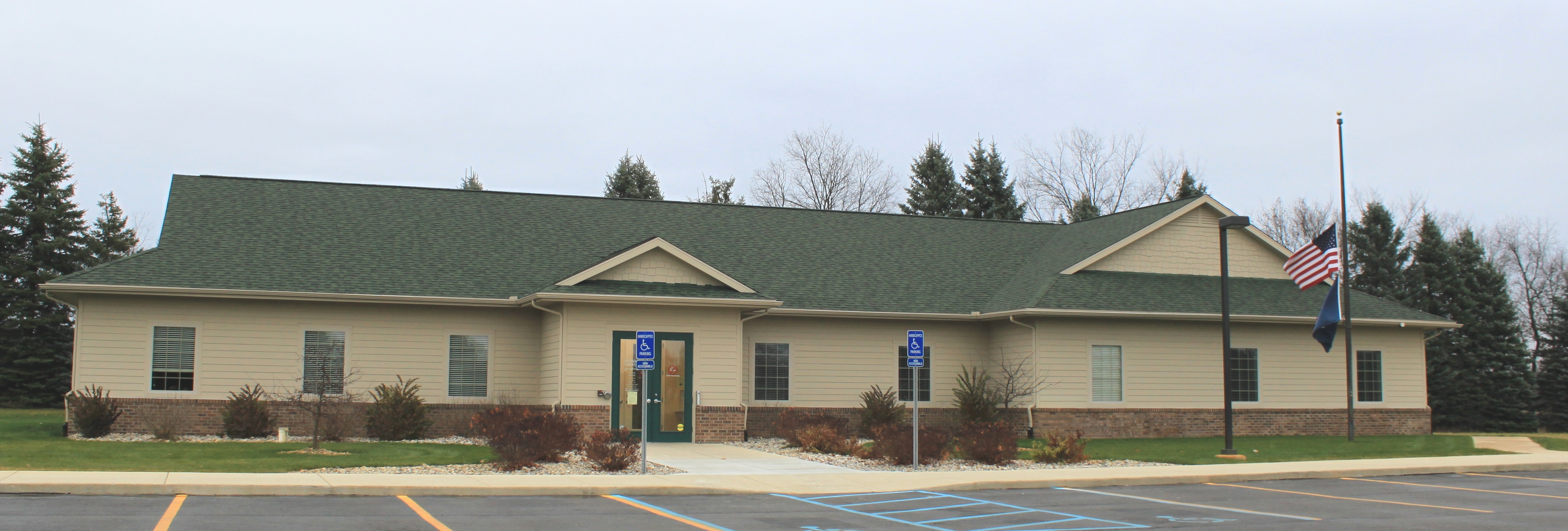
- Putnam Township Hall on West M-36

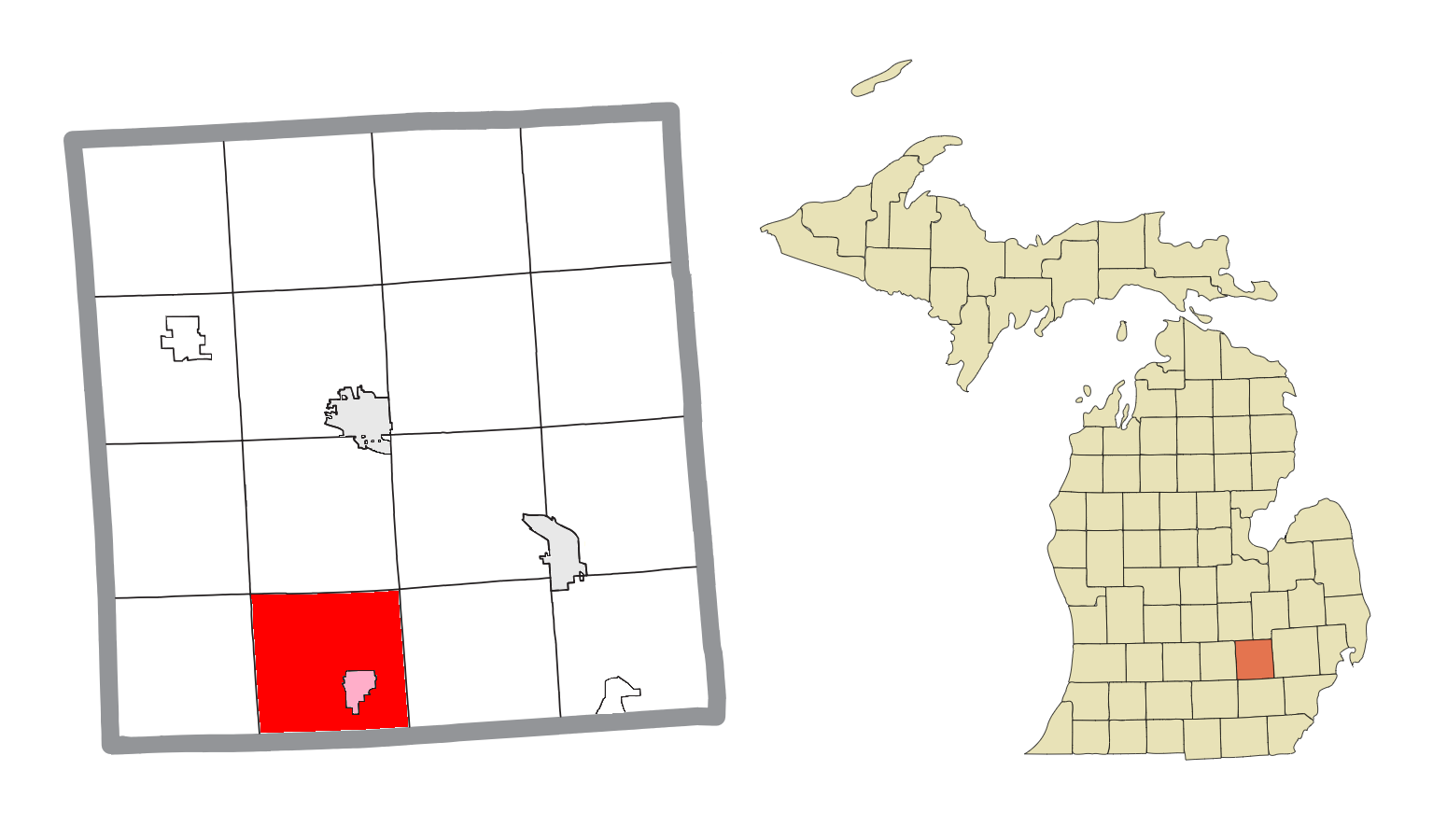
- Location within Livingston County (red) and the administered village of Pinckney (pink)

- Location in Michigan Location in the United States
- Coordinates: 42°27′30″N 83°57′34″W
- Country: United States
- State: Michigan
- County: Livingston
- Established: 1836

Government
  - Supervisor: Dennis Brennan
  - Clerk: Valerie Niemiec

Area
  - Total: 35.6 sq mi (92.2 km^{2})
  - Land: 34.1 sq mi (88.3 km^{2})
  - Water: 1.5 sq mi (3.9 km^{2})
- Elevation: 909 ft (277 m)

Population (2020)
  - Total: 7,890
  - Density: 231/sq mi (89.4/km^{2})
- Time zone: UTC-5 (Eastern (EST))
  - Summer (DST): UTC-4 (EDT)
- ZIP code(s): 48169 (Pinckney); 48843 (Howell)
- Area code: 734
- FIPS code: 26-66540
- GNIS feature ID: 1626946
- Website: www.putnamtwp.us

Putnam Township is a civil township of Livingston County in the U.S. state of Michigan. The population was 7,890 at the 2020 census, down from 8,248 at the 2010 census. The village of Pinckney is located within the township.

== Communities ==
- Anderson is an unincorporated community that began around a station on the Grand Trunk Railroad in 1881. It had a post office from August 1885 until October 1913. It is located on M-36 at 42°28′15″N 84°00′22″W.
- Chalkerville, also known as Chalkers Landing, is located at 42°25′56″N 84°01′07″W on Patterson Lake Drive.
- Chubb's Corners was a hamlet located along the boundary between this township and Marion Township. It had a post office from 1849 until 1894.

== Geography ==
Putnam Township is in southern Livingston County, bordered to the south by Washtenaw County. State highway M-36 crosses the township, passing through Pinckney and leading east 11 miles (18 km) to U.S. Route 23 at Whitmore Lake and northwest 31 miles (50 km) to Mason.

According to the United States Census Bureau, the township has a total area of 36.8 square miles (95.2 km^{2}), of which 34.1 square miles (88.3 km^{2}) are land and 1.5 square miles (3.9 km^{2}), or 4.08%, are water. The township is drained by tributaries of Honey Creek and is part of the Huron River watershed, flowing to Lake Erie.

Portions of Pinckney State Recreation Area and Lakelands Trail State Park are located in Putnam Township.

== Government ==
The government of Putnam Township is a civil township, with trustees and a supervisor.

== Demographics ==
As of the census of 2000, there were 7,500 people, 2,626 households, and 2,087 families residing in the township. The population density was 218.3 inhabitants per square mile (84.3/km^{2}). There were 2,894 housing units at an average density of 84.2 per square mile (32.5/km^{2}). The racial makeup of the township was 97.81% White, 0.17% African American, 0.33% Native American, 0.24% Asian, 0.05% Pacific Islander, 0.20% from other races, and 1.19% from two or more races. Hispanic or Latino of any race were 0.91% of the population.

There were 2,626 households, out of which 39.7% had children under the age of 18 living with them, 68.1% were married couples living together, 7.6% had a female householder with no husband present, and 20.5% were non-families. 15.4% of all households were made up of individuals, and 4.5% had someone living alone who was 65 years of age or older. The average household size was 2.84 and the average family size was 3.18.

In the township the population was spread out, with 27.7% under the age of 18, 7.6% from 18 to 24, 32.9% from 25 to 44, 24.6% from 45 to 64, and 7.1% who were 65 years of age or older. The median age was 36 years. For every 100 females, there were 104.2 males. For every 100 females age 18 and over, there were 102.3 males.

The median income for a household in the township was $61,388, and the median income for a family was $63,704. Males had a median income of $49,211 versus $31,017 for females. The per capita income for the township was $23,974. About 2.8% of families and 3.9% of the population were below the poverty line, including 3.2% of those under age 18 and 5.1% of those age 65 or over.
