= Waterloo State Recreation Area =

State recreation area in Michigan, United States

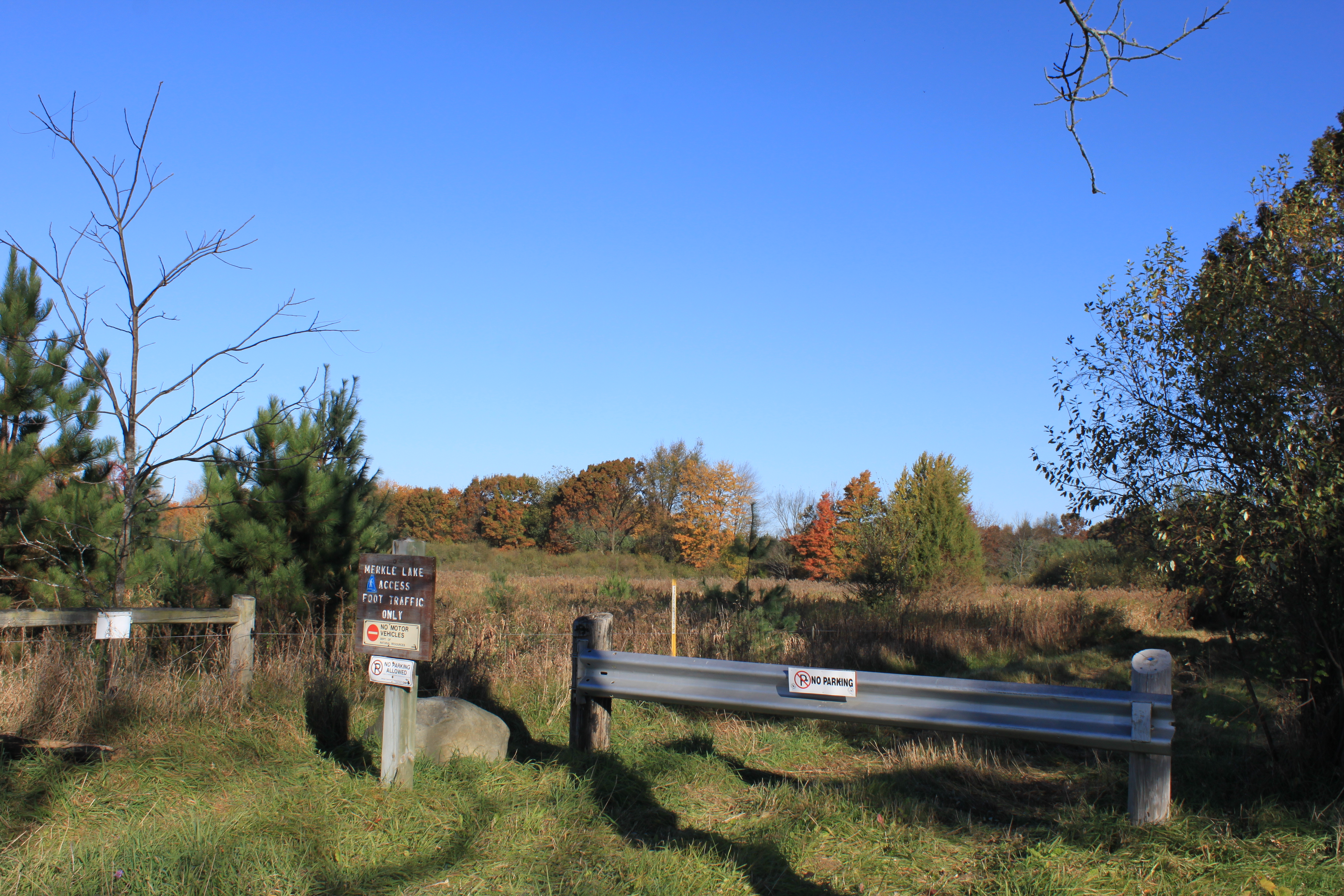
- Markla Lake access walking path

- Location within Michigan Location within the United States
- Location: Jackson / Washtenaw counties, Michigan, USA
- Nearest city: Chelsea, Michigan
- Coordinates: 42°21′41″N 84°11′27″W
- Area: 21,000 acres (85 km^{2})
- Governing body: Michigan Department of Natural Resources
- Website: Official website

Waterloo State Recreation Area is the third-largest state park in Michigan, encompassing over 21,000 acres (85 km^{2}) of forest, lakes and wetlands. Located in northeast Jackson County and parts of Washtenaw County, the park is the largest in the Lower Peninsula of Michigan and features 4 campgrounds, 11 lakes, a nature center, and over 50 miles (80 km) of trails - some for horses, bicycles, hiking and cross-country skiing. Waterloo SRA includes the Black Spruce Bog Natural Area, a National Natural Landmark and borders the 11,000-acre (45 km^{2}) Pinckney Recreation Area on the east and the 950-acre (3.8 km^{2}) Phyllis Haehnle Memorial Audubon Sanctuary to the west. The land preserved by the park is not all contiguous and numerous private landholdings and roads run through the park area. The area is characterized by moraines, kettle lakes, swamps and bogs left by retreating glaciers after the last ice age. The park was created by the federal government during the Great Depression and is long-term leased to the state.

== History ==
The Waterloo area was first settled in the 1830s but the ground was poorly suited for farming and during the Great Depression large numbers of farms were abandoned or in financial trouble. The Federal Emergency Administration of Public Works studied the creation of a variety of kinds of parks in several states. The lands were transferred to the Resettlement Administration of the Department of Agriculture in 1935. In 1935–1936, 45 recreational demonstration projects were established including 12,000 acres (49 km^{2}) at Waterloo. These areas were sited in marginal areas near large population centers to provide outdoor recreation activities and temporary employment. Most of the sites had CCC camps, Works Progress Administration workers and other "relief workers". Permanent organized family, industrial and youth camps, roads, trails, park facilities buildings and bathing facilities were constructed. Waterloo had three permanent camps: the Cedar Lake, Mill Lake and Cassidy Lake camps. Mill Lake served inner-city youth and Cassidy Lake was a year-round trade school before being converted to its current use as a prison in 1942. The Cassidy Lake prison was razed in 2023 and the land opened for public use. Camp Waterloo began as a CCC camp, then served to train military police and as a German POW camp during World War II. It later became a low security prison. Sylvan Pond was created when the WPA put in a dam and levees at Cassidy Lake raised its water level permanently. The clubhouse of former Sylvan Estates Country Club is the current park headquarters.

The recreational demonstration projects were transferred from the Resettlement Administration to the National Park Service in November, 1936. The Park Service ended hunting on all park lands it managed nationwide which created a local controversy in Waterloo. In 1943, the state of Michigan leased the park from the National Park Service under the conditions that it must remain a public park for recreational and conservation purposes. In particular, the lease for Waterloo Park requires marshes be maintained for the sandhill cranes and that Michigan must provide funds to run the Yankee Springs Recreation Area near Grand Rapids, the other recreational demonstration project in the state.

== Facilities and activities ==
The park offers over 434 campsites that are available in two modern campgrounds, one equestrian and one rustic campground. Also available to visitors are thirteen rustic cabins. The park boasts a swimming beach, several picnic sites, 11 fishing lakes, and eight boat launches. Hunting for small game and deer is allowed in most of the park, except for established safety zones around campgrounds and park facilities.

The park offers extensive trails that wind through the vast landscape and around the eleven lakes that exist within the park's confines - 12 miles (19 km) of interpretive nature trails, 47 miles (76 km) of hiking trails and numerous equestrian trails. The 36-mile (58 km) Waterloo-Pinckney Trail runs across the park and into the adjoining 11,000-acre (45 km^{2}) Pinckney Recreation Area.

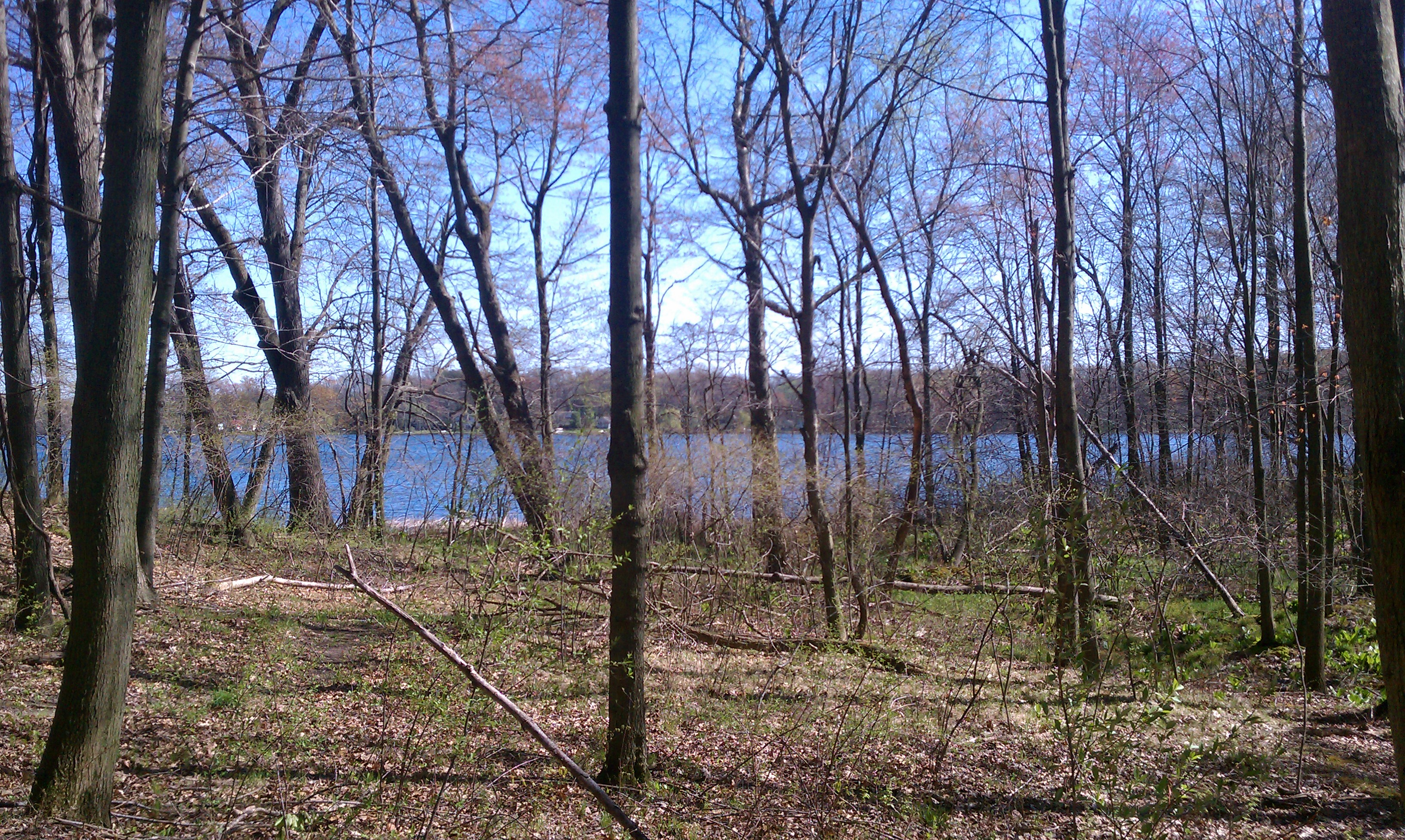
Cedar Lake, in the southeastern corner of Waterloo State Recreation Area

The lakes host a variety of fish species which include Largemouth Bass, Smallmouth Bass, Bluegill, Sunfish, Catfish, Northern Pike and others. Crooked Lake, Clear Lake, Little Portage Lake, Mill Lake, Sugarloaf Lake, Doyle Lake, Merkle Lake, Mud Lake, and the Winnewana Impoundment are among the eleven bodies of water found in the park. Clear Lake, Doyle Lake, Little Portage Lake and Merkle Lake are accessible by foot only by crossing state land. Fishing piers are located on Big Portage and Crooked lakes. Sugarloaf Lake has state owned access limited to campers and a privately owned access site. Public boat launches are located on the following lakes: Big Portage, Cedar, Green, Crooked, Mill, Mud, and Walsh. The Winnewana Impoundment also provides a boat landing. The launch site at Big Portage Lake meets ADAAG standards for universal accessibility. Boats may be rented by visitors at Big Portage Lake from the park if needed.

== Gerald E. Eddy Discovery Center ==
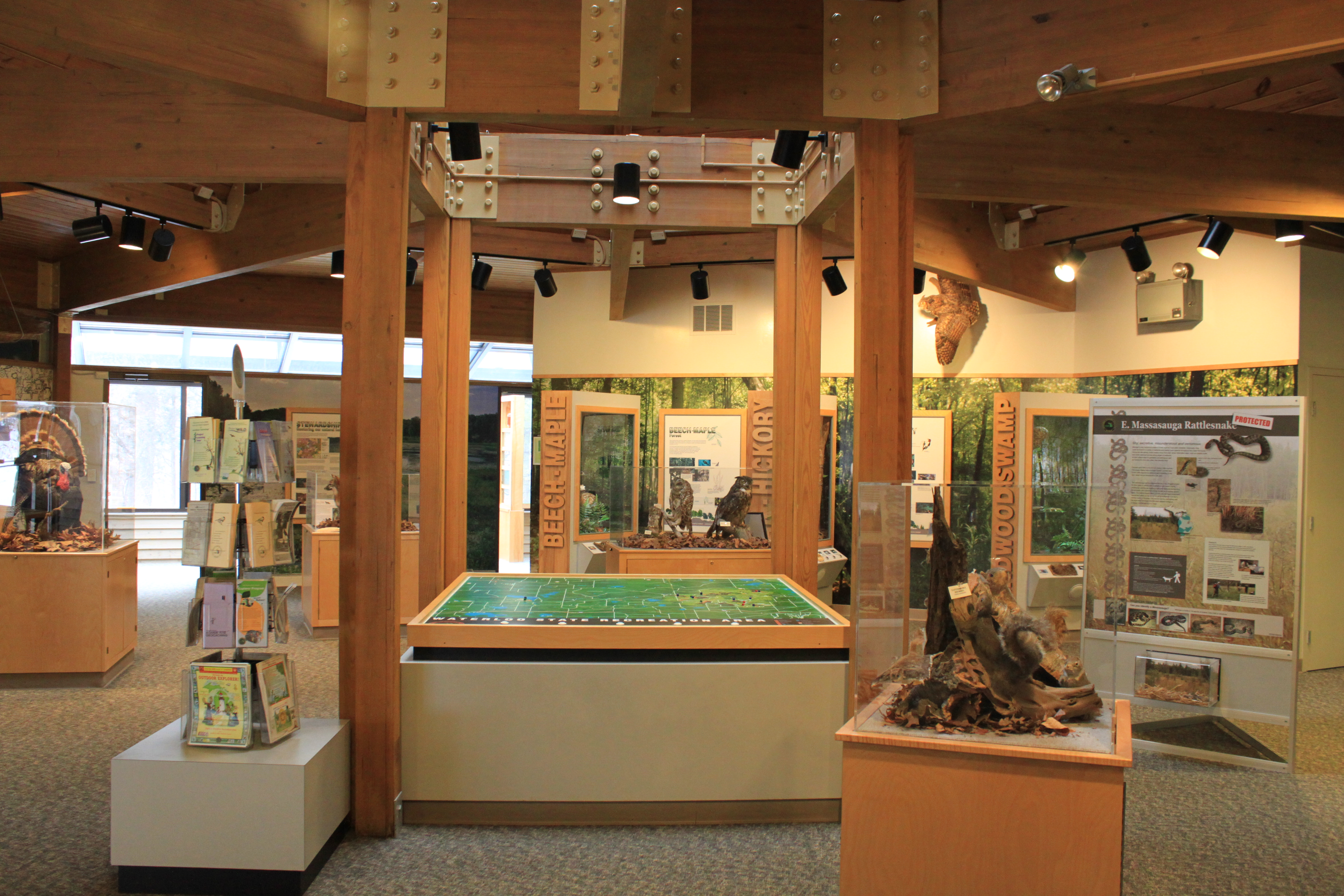
Exhibits in the Discovery Center

The Gerald E. Eddy Discovery Center features exhibits on the geology and natural habitats of Waterloo State Recreation Area, both in pre-settler times and today. Another display shows fluted spear points used by the Paleo-Indian hunters and other cultural history artifacts. There is an auditorium, interactive exhibits and computer games. The center hosts special events and programs for school groups.

== DTE Energy Foundation Trail ==
In 2015, the Potowatomi Mountain Bike association began building a mountain bike trail through the recreation area with the assistance of the Michigan DNR. The trail was named the DTE Energy Foundation Trail in response to the large donation provided by DTE towards its construction. 20 miles of trail have been built as of 2019, with a final segment still planned pending additional funding.

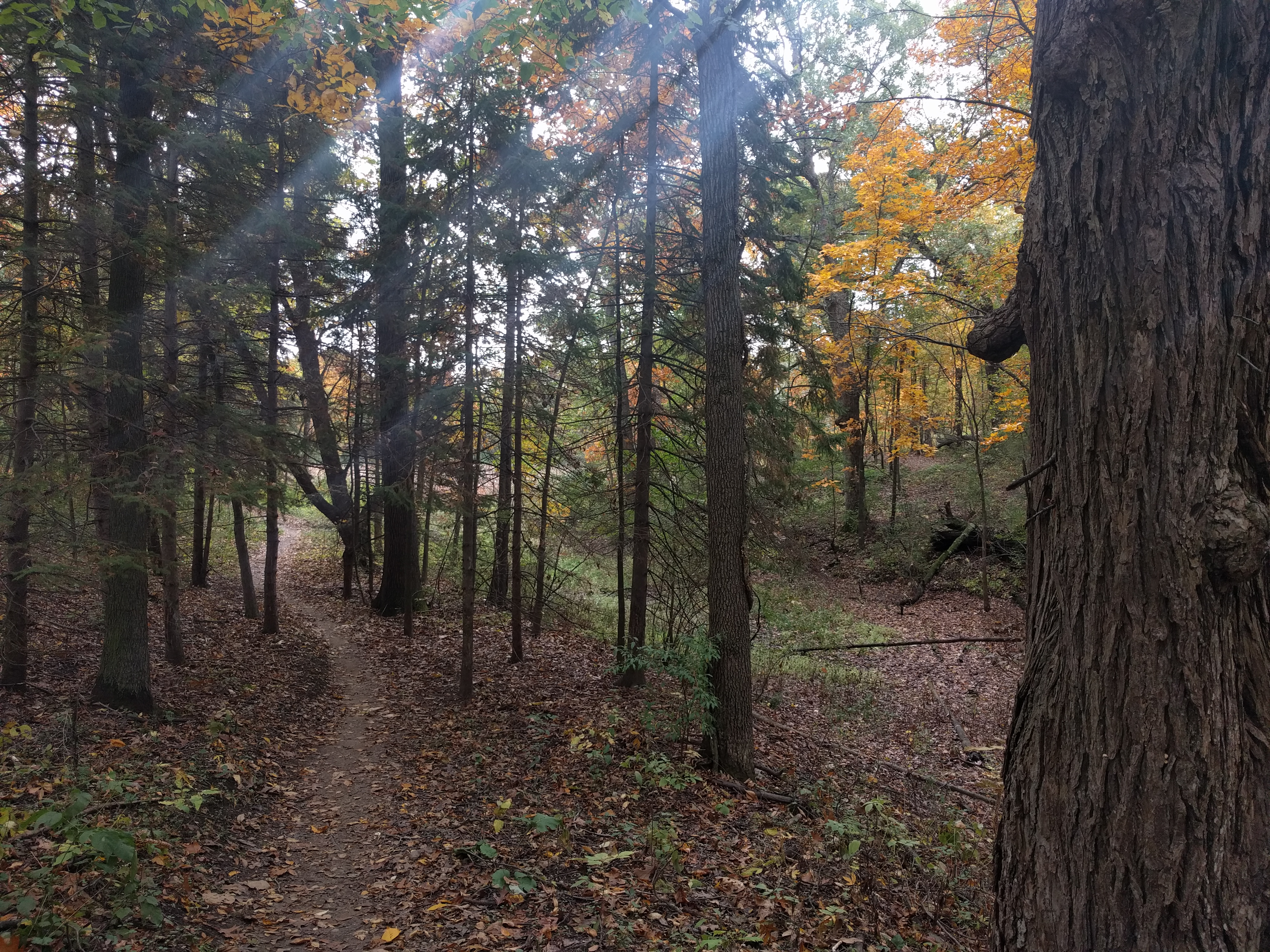
DTE Energy Foundation Trail--Green Lake Loop

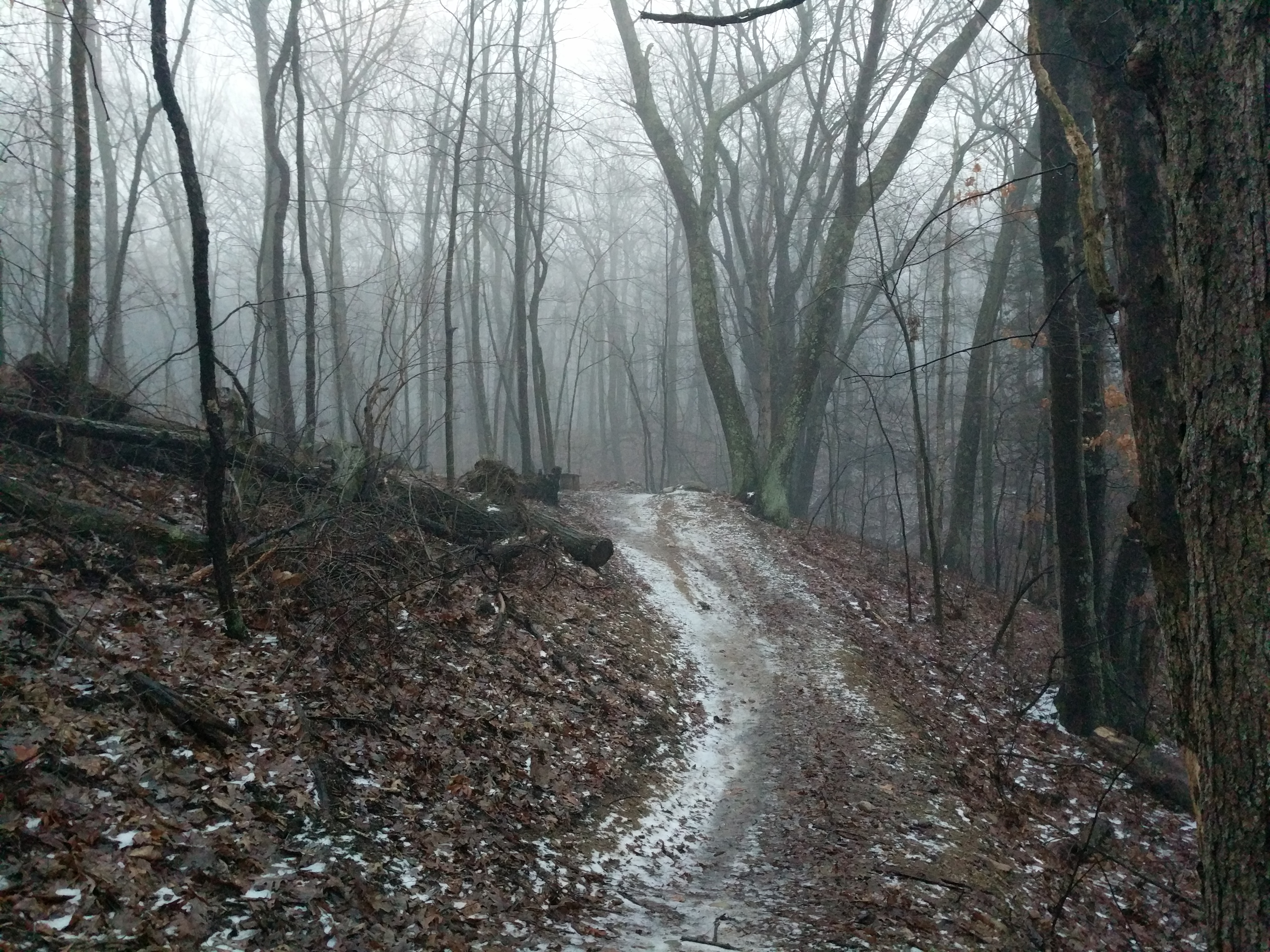
DTE Energy Foundation Trail--Winn Loop

== See also ==
- Waterloo-Pinckney Trail
