= Nissan Sentra =

Compact car

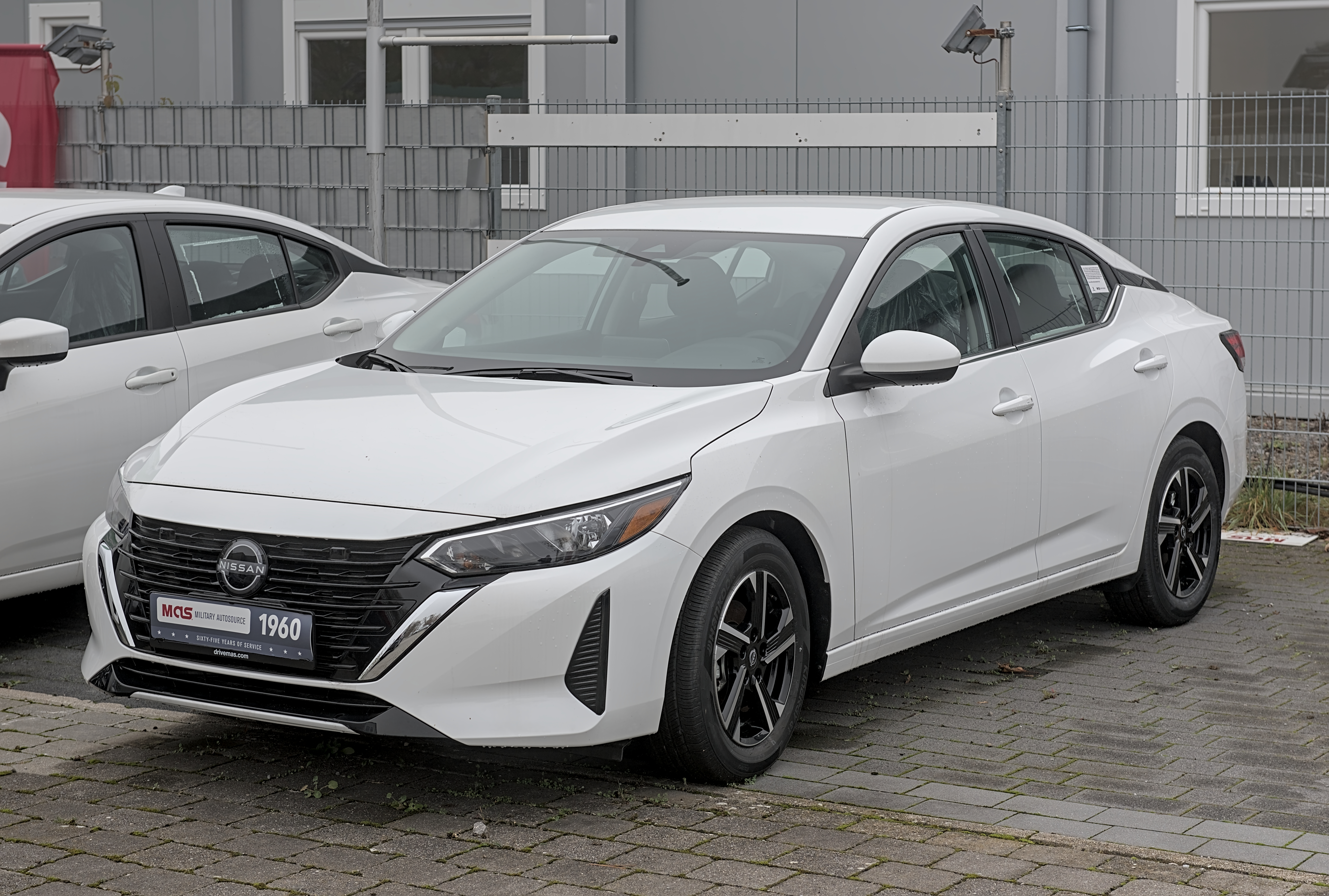
- 2024 Nissan Sentra (B18)

Overview
- Manufacturer: Nissan
- Also called: Nissan Sunny (1982–2006); Nissan Tsuru (1984–2017); Nissan Sylphy (2013–present); Nissan Pulsar (2013–2017)
- Production: 1982–present

Body and chassis
- Class: Subcompact car (1982–1999); Compact car (1999–present)

Chronology
- Predecessor: Datsun Sunny (B310)

The Nissan Sentra is a series of automobiles manufactured by the Japanese automaker Nissan since 1982. Since 1999, the Sentra has been categorized as a compact car, while previously it occupied the subcompact class. Until 2006, Sentra was a rebadged version of the Japanese Nissan Sunny for markets outside of Japan, but since the 2013 model year, Sentra is a rebadged version of the Sylphy for markets outside of Japan. The Sentra nameplate is not used in Japan. Several other countries in Latin America sell their versions of the Sunny as the Sentra. In Mexico, the first three generations of the Sentra were known as the Nissan Tsuru (Japanese for crane), and the B13 model was sold under that name until 2017, alongside the updated models badged as Sentra.

After starting out as a subcompact in North America, the Sentra has grown over the years, with the Nissan Versa having replaced it in the entry-level segment. The Sentra currently serves as Nissan's compact car offering in North America – despite having been rated as a mid-size car by the EPA since model year 2007, due to its interior volume.

The Sentra name was created for Nissan by Ira Bachrach of NameLab, and Bachrach describes the origin as "Nissan wanted consumers to understand that it was quite safe even though it was small. The word Sentra sounds like central as well as sentry, which evokes images of safety."

== First generation (B11; 1982) ==
First generation
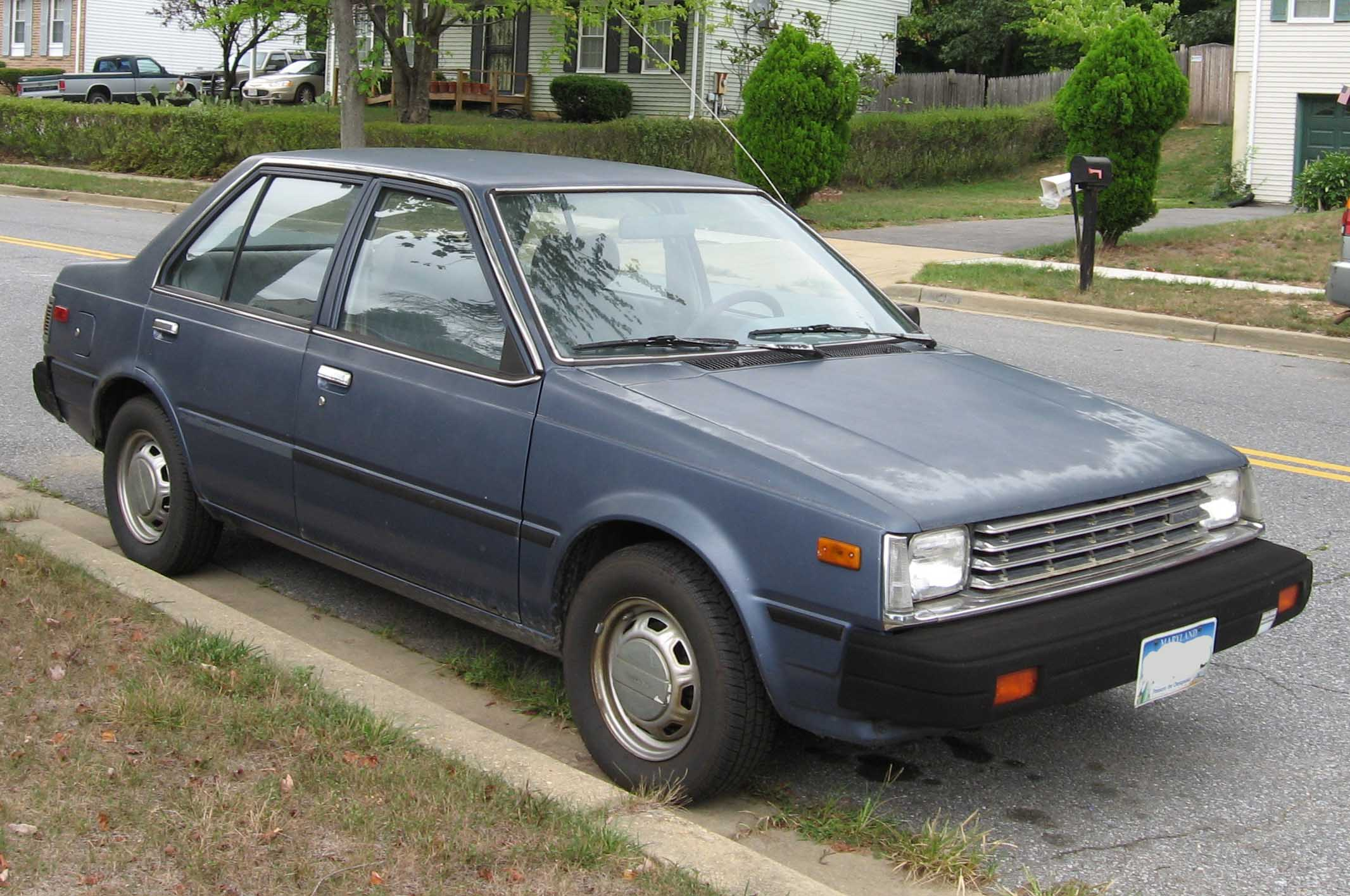

Overview
- Model code: B11
- Also called: Nissan Sunny; Nissan Tsuru (Mexico)
- Production: 1982–1986; 1984–1987 (Mexico)
- Model years: 1982–1986
- Assembly: Japan: Zama, Kanagawa; Mexico: Cuernavaca, Morelos; United States: Smyrna, Tennessee

Body and chassis
- Body style: 2/4-door sedan 3-door hatchback coupe 5-door station wagon
- Layout: Front-engine, front-wheel-drive

Powertrain
- Engine: 1.5 L E15 I4 (gasoline); 1.6 L E16 I4 (gasoline); 1.7 L CD17 I4 (diesel)
- Transmission: 4/5-speed manual 3-speed automatic

Dimensions
- Wheelbase: 94.5 in (2,400 mm)
- Length: 167.3 in (4,249 mm); 172.2 in (4,374 mm) (wagon)
- Width: 63.7 in (1,618 mm)
- Height: 54.5 in (1,384 mm); 53.5 in (1,359 mm) (wagon)

Chronology
- Successor: Nissan Presea (for Laurel Spirit)

The first generation of the Nissan Sentra was introduced in the United States in May 1982 as a direct replacement for the Datsun 310. The model was initially imported from Japan, where it was produced at the Zama plant. Available in four body styles (two-door sedan, four-door sedan, five-door wagon and three-door hatchback coupe), it was the second car to be marketed in the United States under the nameplate of Nissan and using a model name instead of a number. The first one was the Nissan Stanza, introduced at the 1981 New York International Auto Show as a 1982 model. While previous Sunny models had used a front-engine, rear-wheel-drive layout, the B11 Sentra was the first to use a front-engine, front-wheel-drive layout. Engine choice was the 67 hp (50 kW) (E15) 1.5 L four-cylinder SOHC, replacing the old A-Series OHV. This featured semi-hemispherical combustion chambers, high-swirl intake ports and a semi-dual exhaust manifold to provide strong torque at low and medium rpm ranges. Torque peak was 85 lb⋅ft (115 N⋅m) at 3200 rpm. Transmission options were a four-speed manual, 5-speed manual or a three-speed automatic with lock-up torque converter. Drag coefficient was 0.39 for the coupe and 0.40 for 2- and 4-door sedans.

At the time of its release, the Environmental Protection Agency (EPA) gave the Sentra MPG the highest gasoline mileage for gasoline powered cars marketed at that time, 43 miles per gallon in city and 58 miles per gallon in highway, a combined 48 miles per gallon. Curb weight of only 1875 pounds helped it to achieve that number. The Sentra MPG featured a three-way exhaust catalyst and an electronically controlled fuel metering unit to monitor the air-fuel mixture automatically and make adjustments to boost fuel mileage.

Trim levels were Standard, Deluxe, and XE, while price ranges were between US$4,949 for the base two-door sedan up to US$6,899 for the two-door XE hatchback coupe. Standard equipment on all models were four-wheel independent suspension, front disc brakes and rear drums, rack and pinion steering, maintenance-free battery, a rear ashtray, and bucket seats. Deluxe models added halogen headlamps, a remote-locking gas filler door, a carpeted trunk, and a rear wiper washer on the wagon. Deluxe and XE offered tinted glass, trip odometer, a vanity mirror, dual remote mirrors, and door trim. XE offered cut pile carpeting, an analog quartz clock, remote rear window opener, a low-fuel warning light, an AM-FM Clarion stereo radio, power steering, a tachometer, and 155/13 whitewall radial tires. A sunroof was available as an option.

In its first year of sales, the Sentra became the best-selling import in the U.S. and the fourth best-selling passenger car overall (together with the earlier 210), with 191,312 units sold of both cars. The Sentra ended the 1983 year as the eighth-most sold passenger car, with 209,889 units.

The 1983 model-year introduced a 1.7 L CD17 diesel inline-four, mated with a four-speed manual transmission. Also, the 1.5 L was replaced by a 69 hp (51 kW) 1.6 L E16 as the standard engine, available with a five-speed manual or three-speed automatic. Later that year the Sentra also received an electronically controlled carburetor.

In April 1985, Nissan started production of the Sentra in the Smyrna, Tennessee plant, after a US$85 million investment. The only body style manufactured in the US was the two-door sedan. The 1985 model-year received aerodynamically styled headlamps, a revised grille and blackwall tires. An SE option was introduced as two-door hatchback model, with alloy wheels, black lower body paint and black out grille. An automatic transmission was optional on all Sentras except the two-door base sedan, MPG Diesel and SE coupe. Prices were starting at US$5,499 (~$13,956 in 2025). The diesel engine was discontinued in the U.S. market soon thereafter. Consumer Reports magazine ranked the B11 reliability as "better than average" in 1985.

The B11 model was ranked the seventh safest car in a ranking made by the Center for Auto Safety in 1983, which examined the National Highway Traffic Safety Administration (NHTSA) testing, consisting of frontal crashes at 35 miles per hour.

=== Mexico ===
In 1984, the Sentra entered production in Nissan Mexicana's Cuernavaca plant as the Nissan Tsuru. It was built there until 1987 when it was replaced by the next generation; in total 210,565 of the first Tsuru were built in Mexico.

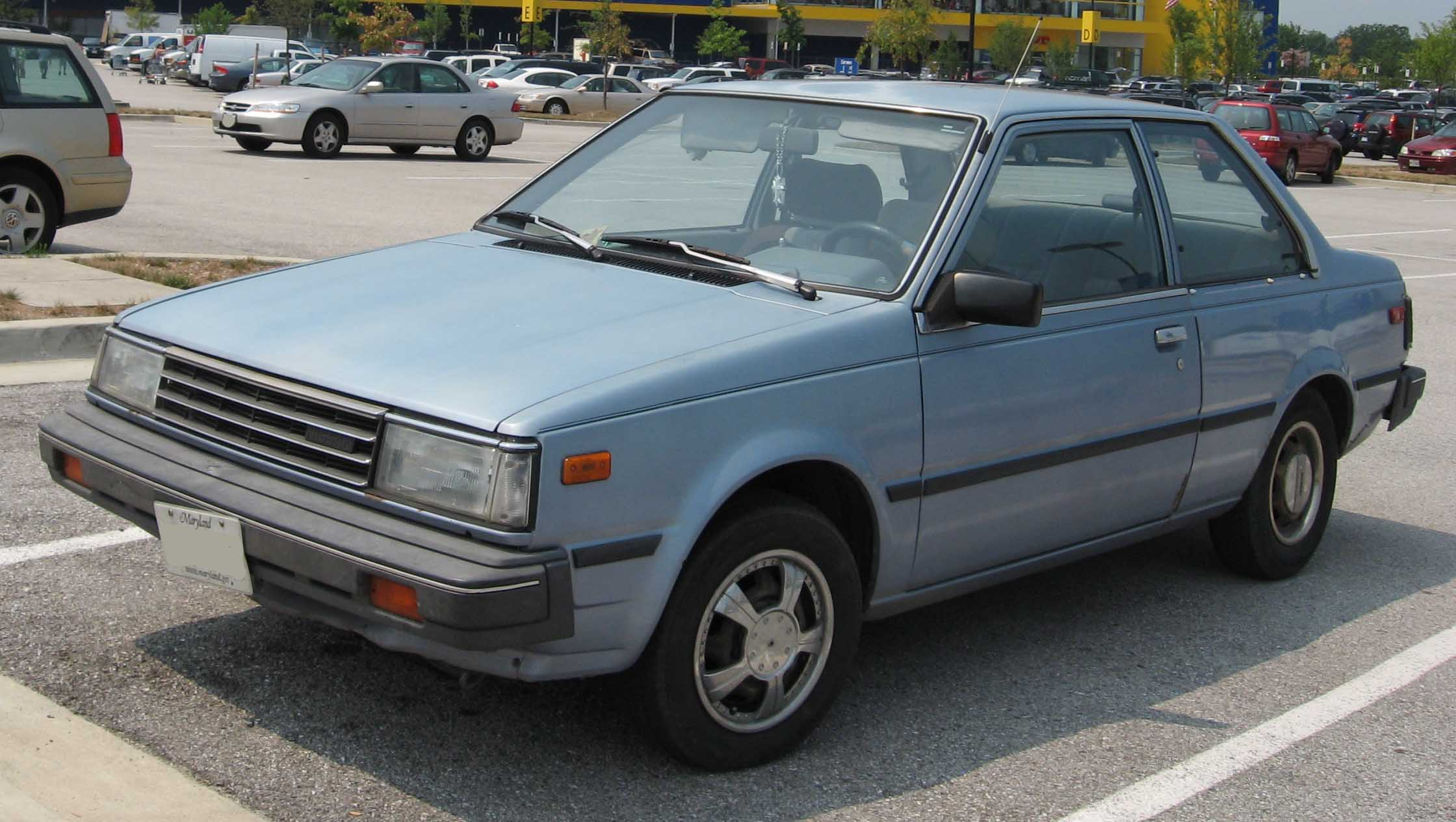
1985–1986 Nissan Sentra two-door sedan

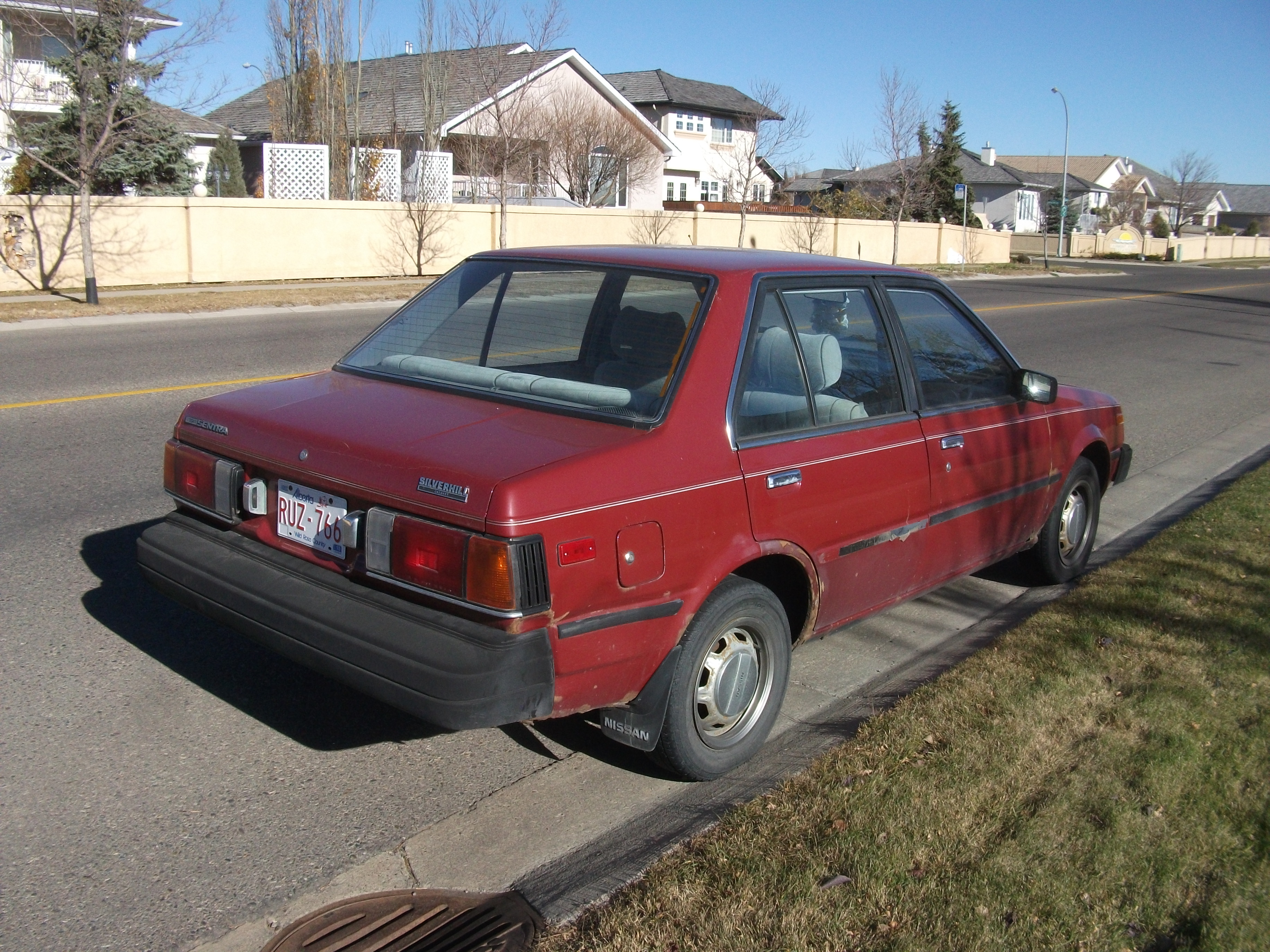
1985–1986 Nissan Sentra 4-door sedan

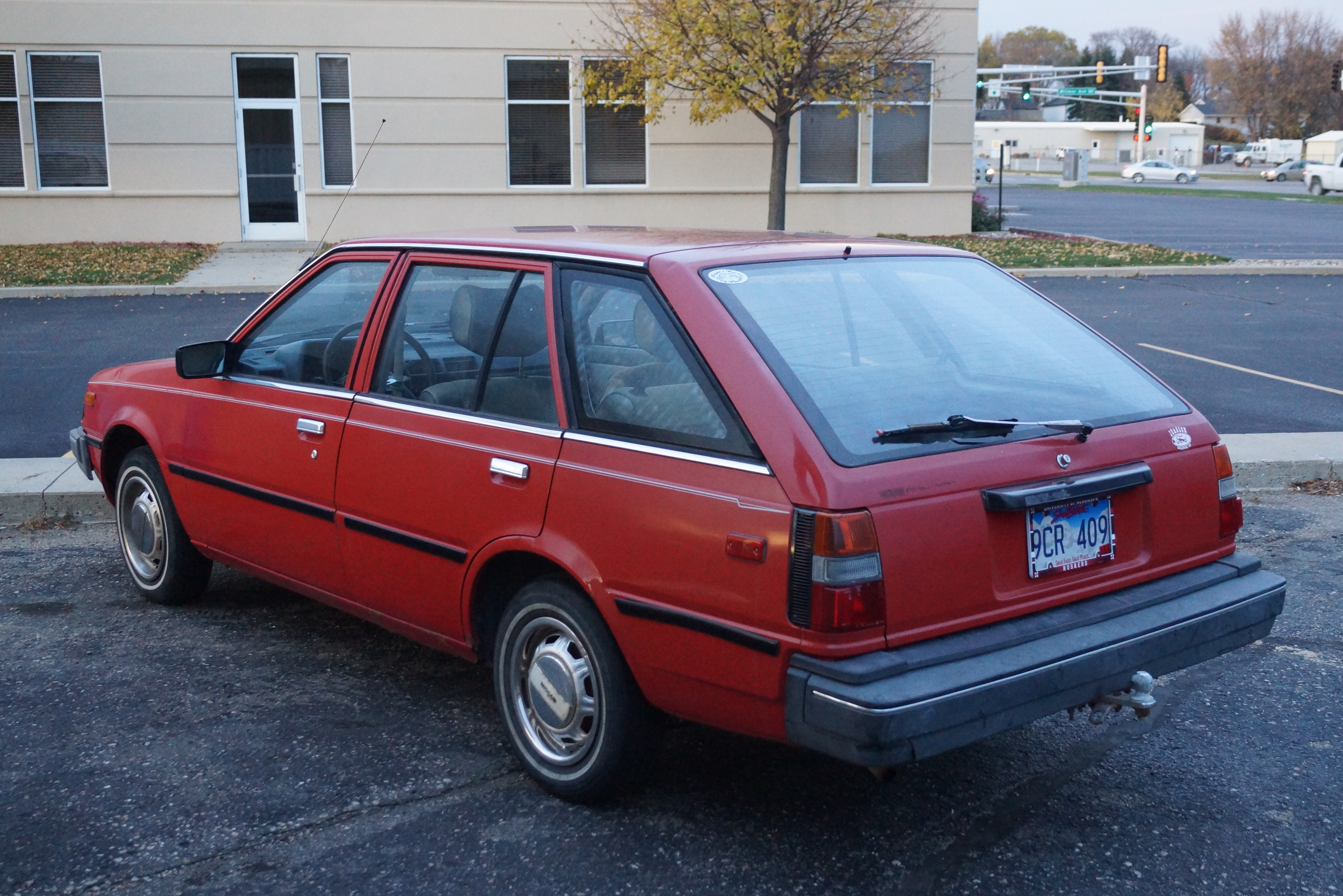
1985–1986 Nissan Sentra wagon

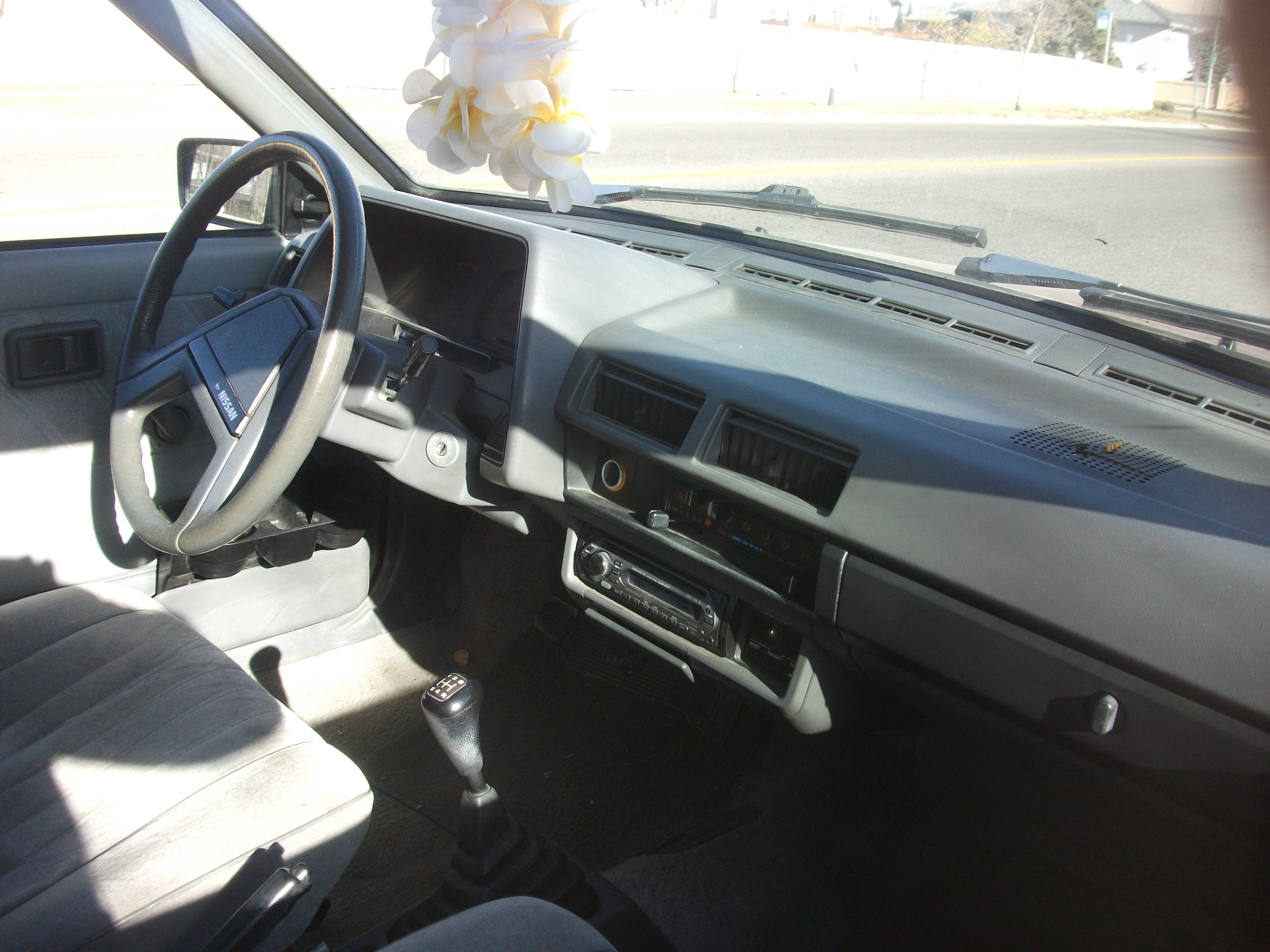
Interior

== Second generation (B12; 1986) ==
Second generation
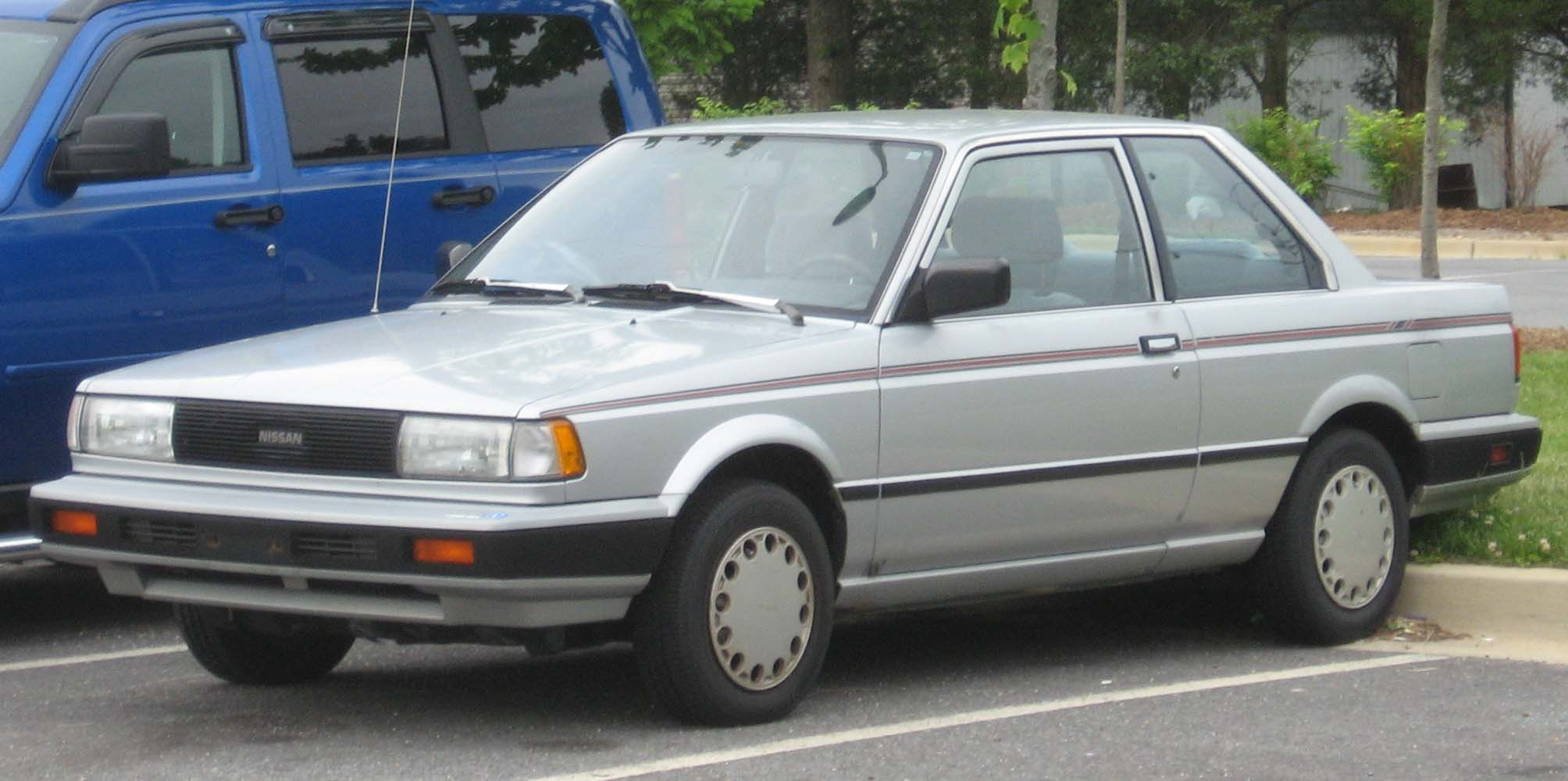

Overview
- Model code: B12
- Also called: Nissan Sunny; Nissan Tsuru (Mexico)
- Production: 1986–1990
- Model years: 1987–1990
- Assembly: United States: Smyrna, Tennessee; Mexico: Cuernavaca, Morelos; Japan: Oppama Plant, Yokosuka, Kanagawa; Philippines: Makati; South Africa: Rosslyn, Gauteng (NSA)

Body and chassis
- Body style: 2/4-door sedan 3-door hatchback 5-door station wagon 3-door hatchback coupe
- Layout: Front-engine, front-wheel-drive / four-wheel-drive

Powertrain
- Engine: 1.4 L (84.9 cu in) GA14DE I4; 1.5 L (90.8 cu in) E15 I4 (Latin America); 1.6 L (97.5 cu in) E16S/E16i I4; 1.6 L (97.5 cu in) E16ST turbo I4 (Mexico); 1.6 L (97.5 cu in) GA16i 12V I4; 1.7 L (102.5 cu in) CD17 diesel I4
- Transmission: 4/5-speed manual 3-speed automatic

Dimensions
- Wheelbase: 95.7 in (2,431 mm)
- Length: 168.7 in (4,285 mm) (sedan); 166.5 in (4,229 mm) (coupe); 162.4 in (4,125 mm) (hatchback); 172.2 in (4,374 mm) (wagon)
- Width: 64.6 in (1,641 mm) (coupe, sedan, wagon & hatchback); 65.6 in (1,666 mm) (sport coupe)
- Height: 54.3 in (1,379 mm) (coupe, sedan & wagon); 52.2 in (1,326 mm) (sport coupe); 55.3 in (1,405 mm) (hatchback); 54.9 in (1,394 mm) (4WD wagon)

=== United States/Canada ===
This generation carried on the multitude of body styles that the B11 had, including a station wagon, two-door or four-door sedan, three-door hatchback and the hatchback-bodied Sport Coupé. While the B12 chassis was first produced and marketed in 1985 in most parts of the world, it was not offered to the United States until August 1986, for the 1987 model year. The two-door sedan model of the previous generation Sentra (a bodystyle no longer offered outside of North America) was the only bodystyle built in Nissan's Smyrna, Tennessee plant, representing about 22 percent of Sentra sales in North America in 1986. With the new generation, the plant underwent a five-month conversion and when production of the B12 Sentra began on August 12, 1986, it was also built as a four-door sedan. In December, the three-door Hatchback bodystyle was added to the US production, followed by the station wagon bodystyle in January 1987.

The B12 carried over a radically modified 4-wheel independent suspension from the B11, with all-wheel disc brakes an option in some parts of the world. This was the start of the model classes which were standard through the 2003 model year (not all classes were available every year) having the E as the base-level economy car, the XE as the next-up model, the GXE as the top level for the 4-door sedan (and wagon), and the sporty SE coupe. The GXE (available from 1987 to 2003) had a body colored bumper, aero side mirrors with manual remote control, tachometer as well as standard 13" 175/70R13 alloy wheels along with air-conditioning, variable intermittent wipers, but no standard cassette deck nor any power windows/locks/mirrors. The SE also had dual mirrors, air conditioning, tachometer, and power door locks and windows in some markets and possibly electronic fuel injection.

The B12 chassis would be the last chassis to offer a station wagon model. Even more rare are the four-wheel drive versions of the station wagon, offered as an option for the 1987 (late introduction), 1988, and 1989 model years. These models featured an electrically activated single-range transfer case to drive the independently suspended rear wheels, making the car a selectable four-wheel-drive (not all-wheel-drive) vehicle. Sales were mediocre, totalling 429 in calendar year 1986, 2,050 in 1987, 2,408 in 1988, and a final 892 deliveries in 1989.

All 1987 Sentras came standard with the E16 engine with 70 hp (52 kW), excepting the Sport Coupé and the later four-wheel-drive wagon, which received the throttle-body-injected E16i engine with identical power output. A five-speed manual transmission was standard, with a three-speed automatic available as an option. In 1988, all Sentras had the 70 hp (52 kW) E16i, which was offered for this year with throttle body injection (TBI). In many parts of the world the E-series soldiered on in the B12 chassis with some versions getting the multi-point fuel injection E16E engine. From 1989 to 1990, the only engine choice was the 90 hp (67 kW) GA16i, a 12-valve SOHC predecessor of the GA16DE. Transaxles offered were the 4- and 5-speed manuals (RN4F31A and RS5F31A, respectively) and a 3-speed automatic with torque converter lockup (RL3F01A).

The 1987 Sentra earned a 1-star out of 5 rating for the driver in the NHTSA 35-mph full frontal crash test, the lowest possible. Nissan rectified this problem with the 1988 and later models, which earned a 3-star rating.

1989 saw a subtle change in the body style of the Sentra sedan, as new larger, more rounded front corner lights were introduced to the front fenders and redesigned taillights were added to the rear fascia (station wagon retained same rear lights). The Nissan logo on the front grille was relocated from the right hand side to the center. In 1990, electrically retracted front shoulder belts were added (for the US market only), as well as three-point harnesses for the outboard, rear seat passengers.

The Sport Coupe was a sportier style of the Sentra. It shared none of the body components with the standard model and was always imported from Japan, rather than being built in Tennessee. It was only available with the E16i or GA16i. All Sport Coupes had dual sway bars, dual remote-adjust mirrors, and a tachometer instrument cluster. The SE model added features like air conditioning and rear speakers. All B12 Sentras use the same wiring harness, regardless of the options installed on any particular vehicle.

In Canada, the B12 four-door sedan remained available through the 1993 model year. Essentially a rebadged, Mexican-built Nissan Tsuru II, it was called Sentra Classic to distinguish it from the B13 model released for 1991. It replaced the Nissan Micra 3/5-door hatchbacks as Nissan's Canadian market price-leader model as they were discontinued at the same time. All 1991–1993 "Classic" models came with the 70 hp (52 kW) E16i and the choice of two transmissions, a 5-speed manual or 3-speed automatic.

=== South Africa ===
In South Africa, this car was sold with Sentra badging and the four-door sedan or three-door hatchback coupé bodywork. Aside from not being fitted with any emissions controls to speak of, specifications were closer to a Japanese/global market Sunny than to the North American Sentra. The Sentra received the 1.3-liter E13 engine or the 1.6-liter E16, with fuel injection fitted to the top-of-the-line SGLi (sedan) and GXEi (coupé) models. Only South Africa manufactured the Nissan Sentra with the larger, 131 hp (98 kW) 1.8-liter 16V twin cam CA18DE engine. Torque is 159 N⋅m (117 lb⋅ft) at 5200 rpm. Production of this model were 720 units, although this number remains unsubstantiated.

=== Latin America ===
In Mexico, it was named the Nissan Tsuru II, available in 2, 4-door sedans and wagon, while the Coupé was named the Nissan Hikari. They were produced and marketed locally between 1988 and 1991. For 1988 for the 4 door Tsuru II and the Hikari had available the Turbo EGI (fuel injected) 1.6 L engine in a very rare, sporty version. It was one of the most reliable cars in its time in Mexico, being a great sales success. 343,263 of the Tsuru II were built in Mexico between 1987 and 1991. This generation was also exported to some Central and South American markets such as Peru, Chile and Bolivia. In Chile the Mexican-made car received "Sentra" badging and was available from October 1987 until 1993. The Sentra was the most sold car in the country in 1991 and 1992.

In the Philippines, it was initially offered in three trims namely the 1.7 DX (diesel), 1.3 SLX and the 1.5 SGX, the wagon version was also available in the 1.5 SGX trim and was simply called the Nissan California. In mid 1989, the Sentra model line was freshened up and the engines were upgraded to 1.4- (LX) and 1.6-liter. The 1.6 SGX gained power steering, windows, door locks and side mirrors, a first in its class. The second-generation B12 also had a diesel variant which had the 1.7 CD17 engine. The second wagon version (known as Nissan California 1.6 SGX) also had all power features.

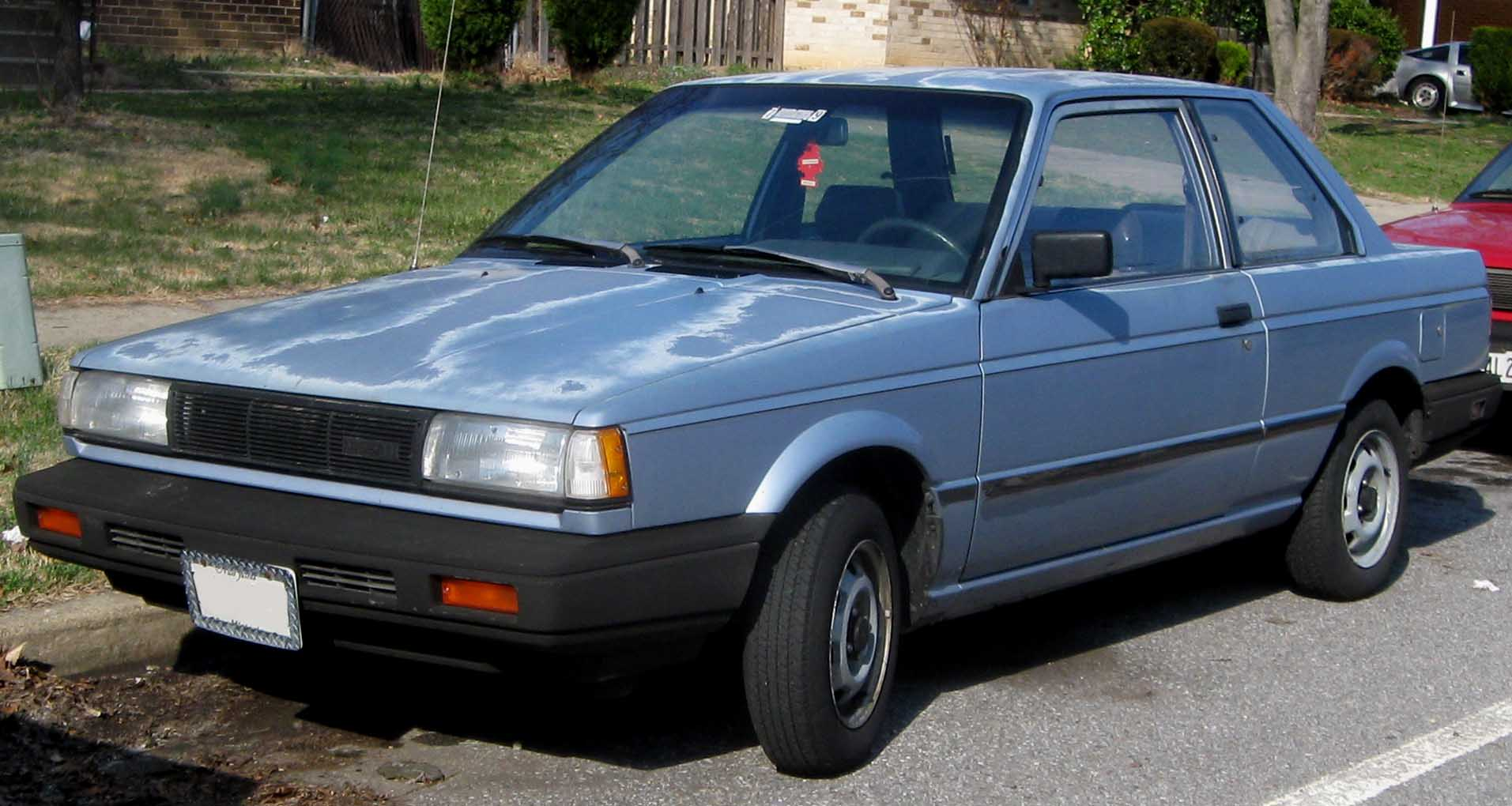
1987–1988 Nissan Sentra 2-door (US)

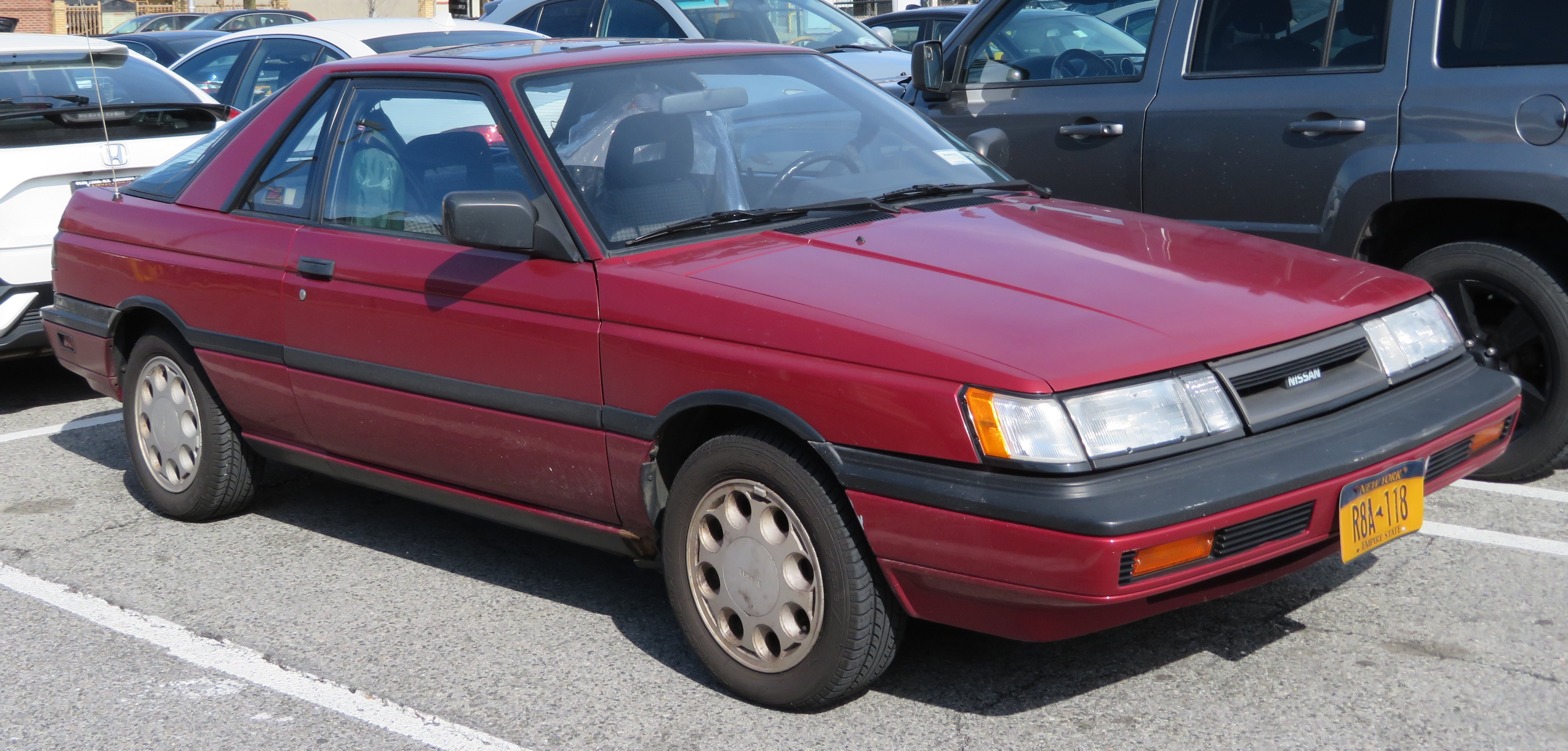
1987–1988 Nissan Sentra SE Sport Coupé (US)

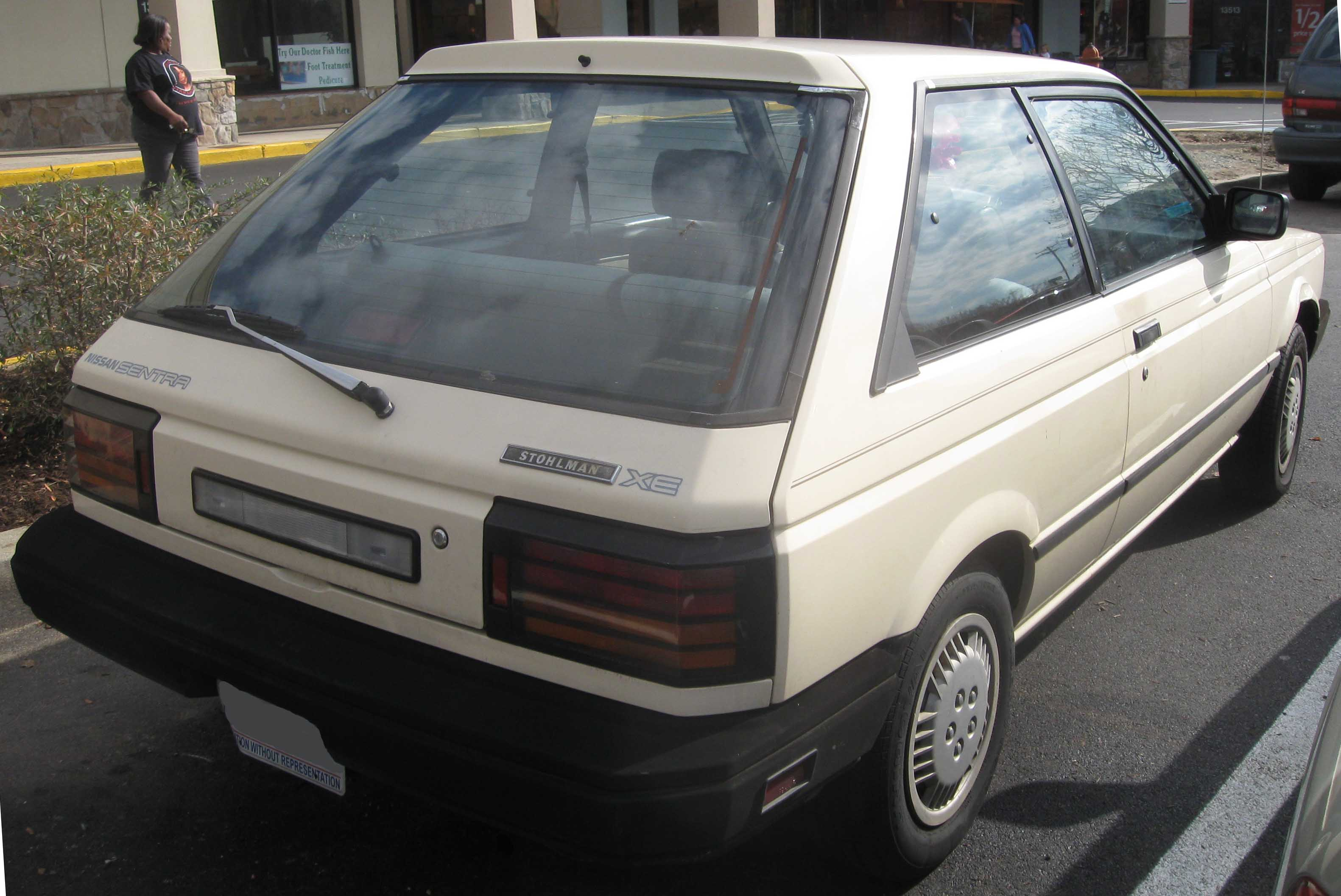
Nissan Sentra XE 3-door (US)

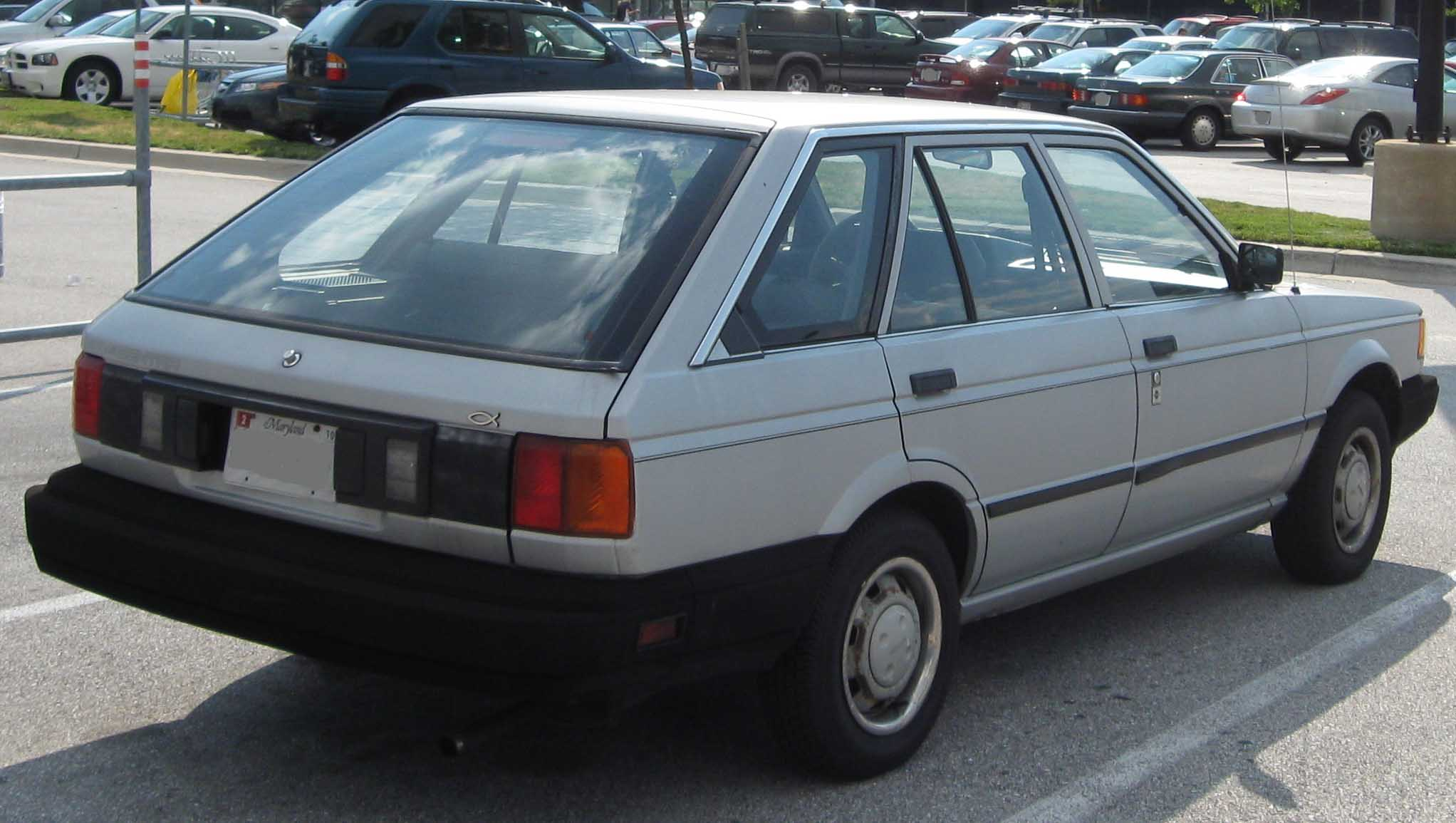
1989–1990 Nissan Sentra wagon (US)

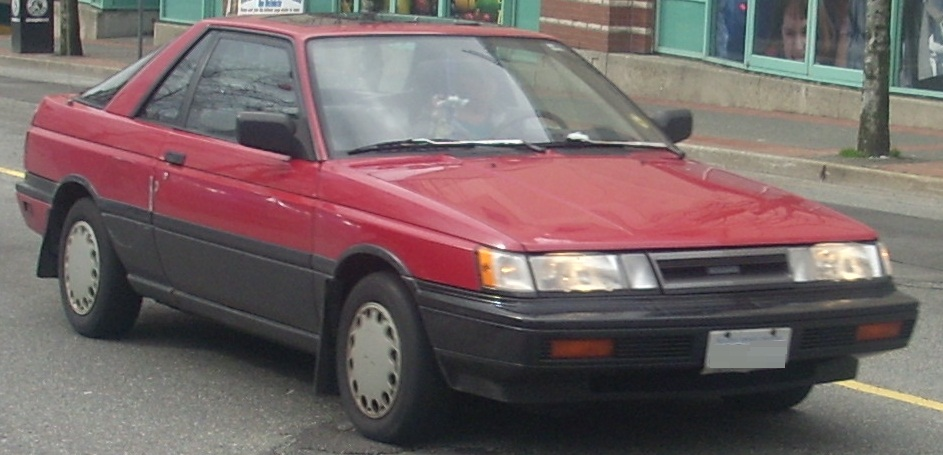
1989–1990 Nissan Sentra Sport Coupé (North America)

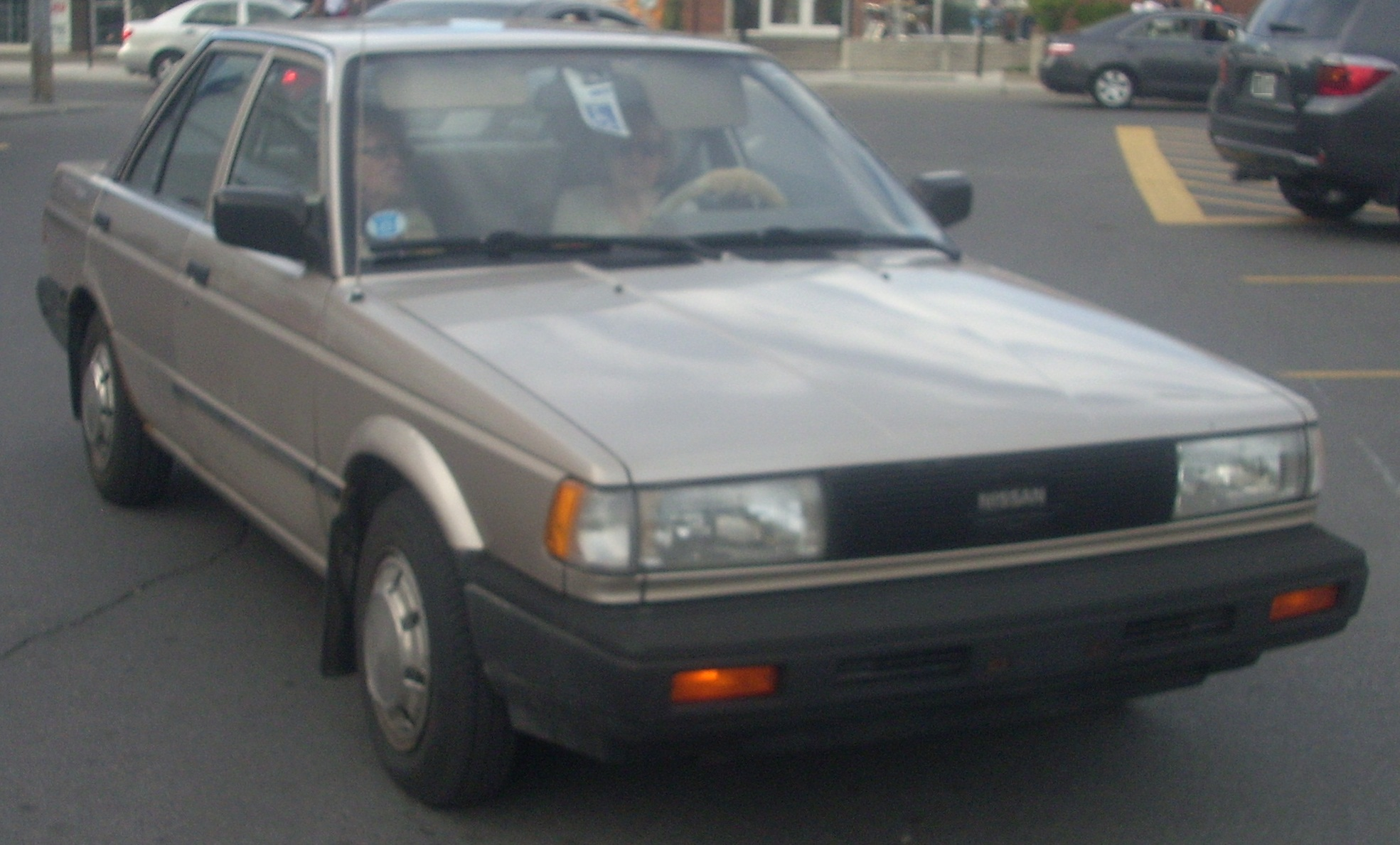
1989–1990 Nissan Sentra sedan (North America)

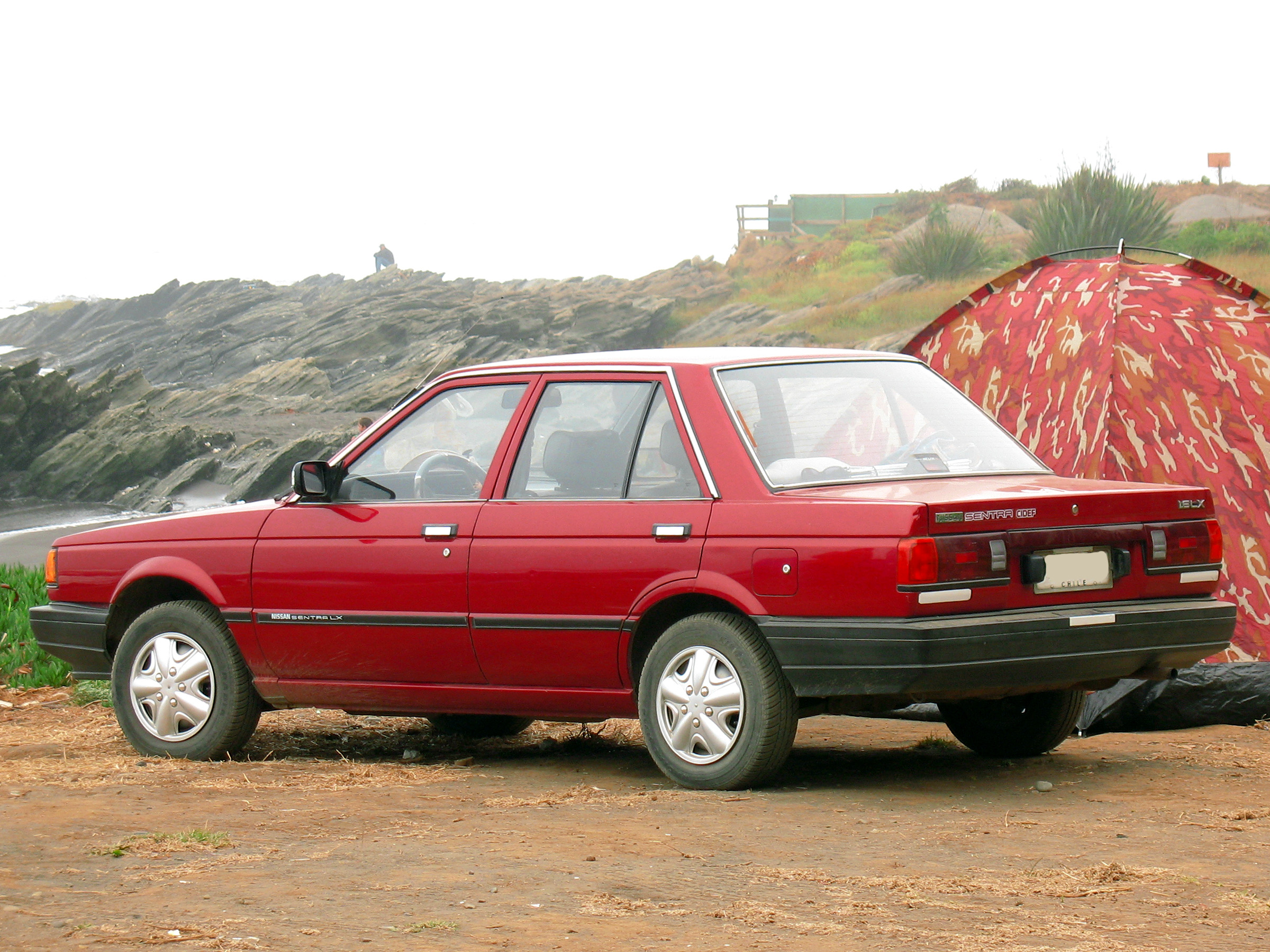
Nissan Sentra Sedan 1.6 LX (South America)

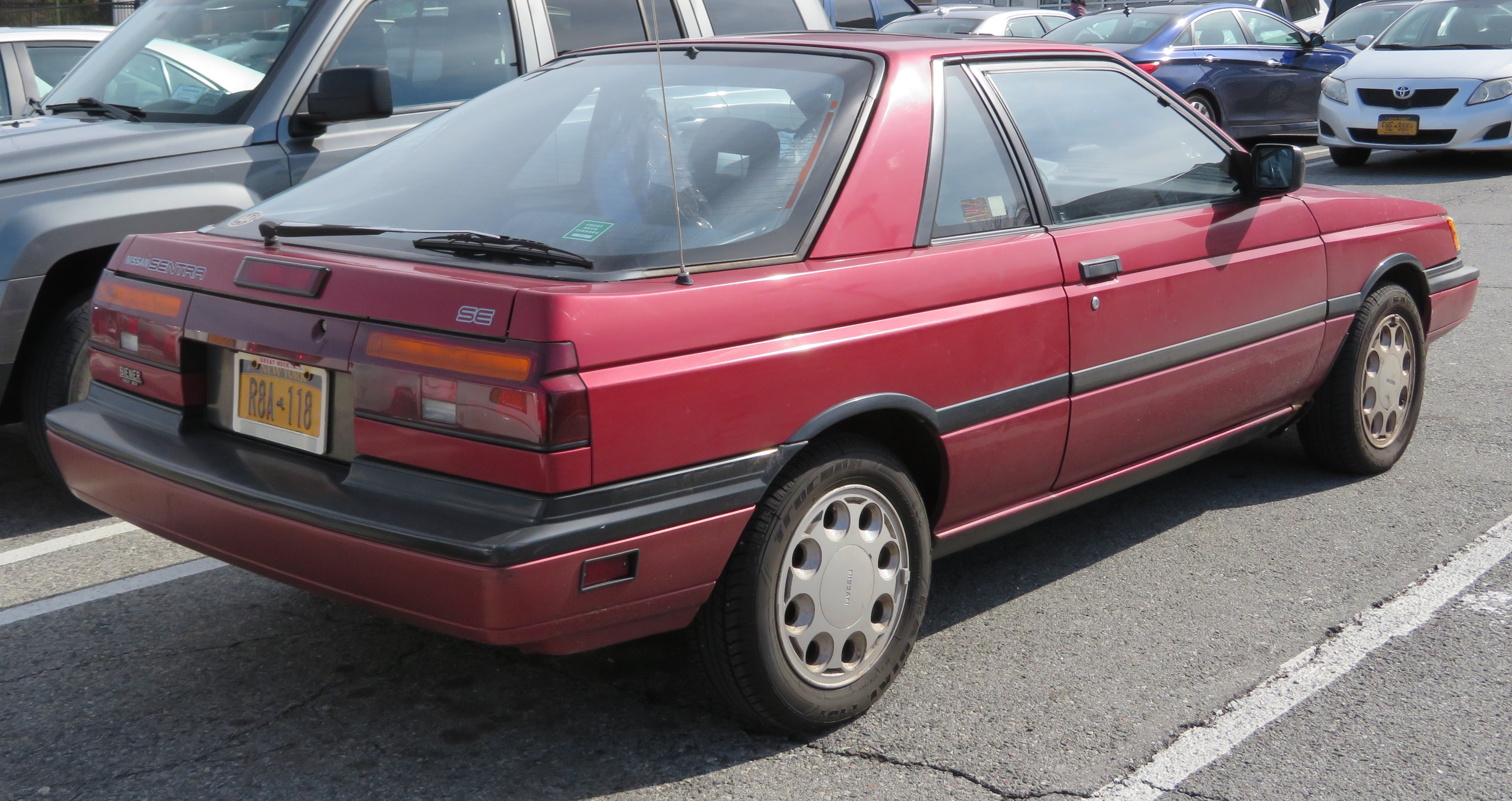
Nissan Sentra SE Sport Coupé (US)

== Third generation (B13; 1990) ==
Third generation
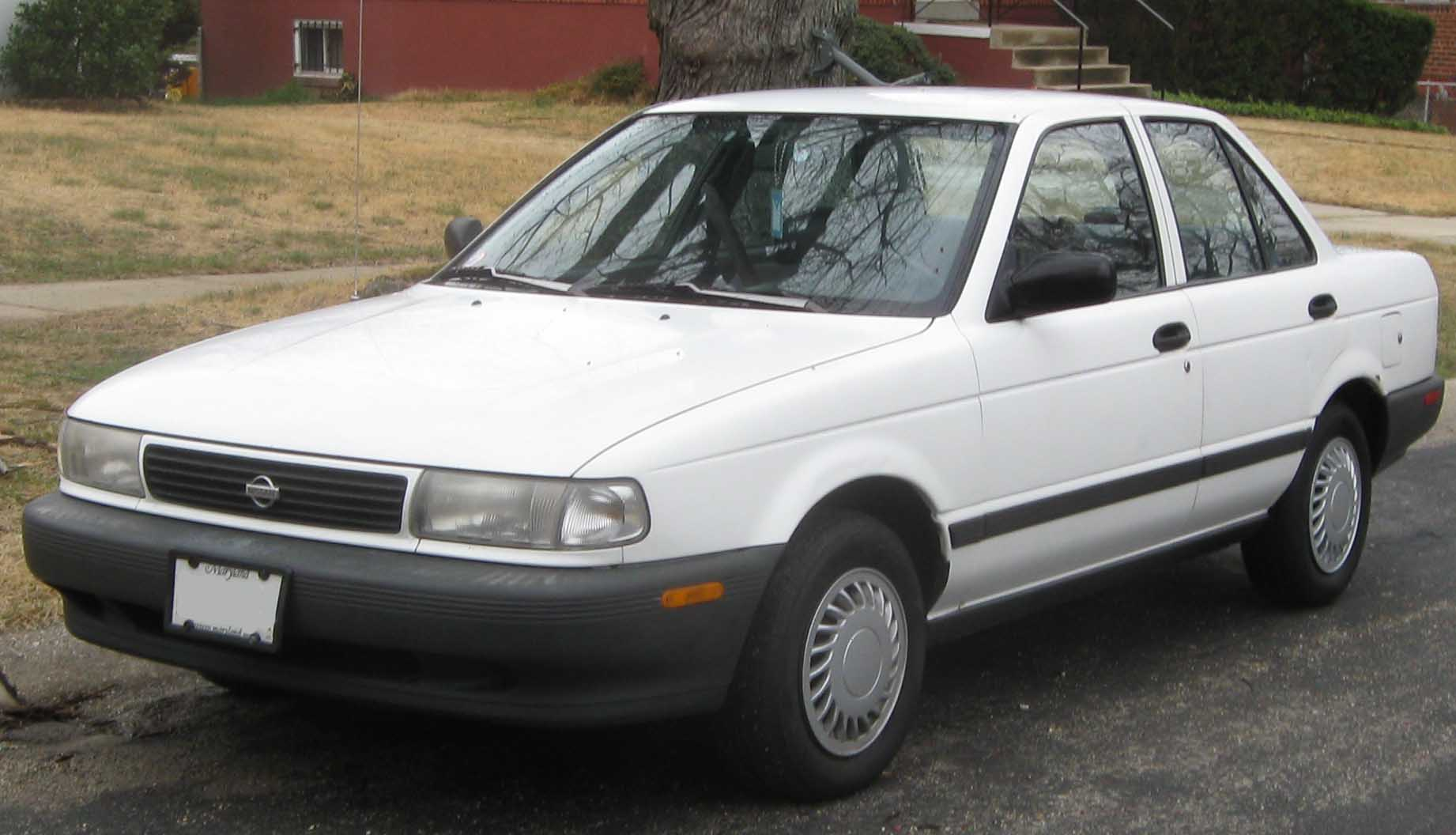
- Nissan Sentra E 4-door Sedan in the US

Overview
- Model code: B13
- Also called: Nissan Sunny (B13); Nissan Tsuru (Mexico); Nissan V16 (Chile); Nissan Sentra (B13) (South America); Nissan Genesis (Indonesia)
- Production: August 1990 – October 1994; 1992 – May 2017 (Mexico); September 1991 – October 1999 (Philippines)
- Model years: 1991–1994
- Assembly: United States: Smyrna, Tennessee; Mexico: Cuernavaca, Morelos; Japan: Oppama Plant, Yokosuka, Kanagawa; Taiwan: Miaoli (Yulon); Philippines: Makati (September 1991 – July 1998); Santa Rosa, Laguna (August 1998 – October 1999) (Nissan Motor Philippines); Indonesia: Jakarta; Malaysia: Kuala Lumpur
- Designer: Kōichi Yasui

Body and chassis
- Body style: 2/4-door sedan
- Layout: Front-engine, front-wheel-drive
- Related: Nissan Sunny; Nissan Presea; Nissan NX

Powertrain
- Engine: 1295 cc GA13DS I4 (Asia); 1392 cc GA14DS/DE I4; 1597 cc E16 I4; 1597 cc GA16DE/DNE I4; 1998 cc SR20DE I4
- Transmission: 4/5-speed manual; 3/4-speed automatic

Dimensions
- Wheelbase: 2,431 mm (95.7 in); Tsuru: 2,430 mm (95.7 in)
- Length: 170.3 in (4,326 mm); Tsuru: 4,325 mm (170.3 in)
- Width: 65.6 in (1,666 mm) (1991–92); 65.7 in (1,669 mm) (1993–94); Tsuru: 1,650 mm (65.0 in)
- Height: 53.0 in (1,346 mm); 53.9 in (1,369 mm) (coupe & 1991–92 sedan); 54.1 in (1,374 mm) (1993–94 sedan); Tsuru: 1,381 mm (54.4 in)
- Curb weight: 2 door: 1,028 kg (2,266 lb); 4 door: 1,038 kg (2,288 lb)

Chronology
- Successor: Nissan Versa/V-Drive (N17) (Mexico)

The sedan featured the fuel-injected 110-126 hp (94 kW) and 108 pound-feet (146 N⋅m) 1.6-liter 16-valve 4-cylinder GA16DE engine. It came in the base model, E, XE, SE, and GXE. The GXE came with a power package such as power windows/locks/mirrors while the XE, SE, SE-R came with standard or optional sunroof and alloy wheels. In the United States, the four-door models came with front motorized shoulder seat belts, while the two-door models came with automatic front door-mounted 3-point seat belts. The short-lived three-door hatchback of the B12 Sentra was not replaced in this generation, and the sporting coupé version was replaced by the ovoid Nissan NX.

For the 1992 model year (August 1991 – July 1992 production), a passenger's side vanity mirror and black body-side moldings became standard on the Sentra 2-door. The Value Option Package (air conditioning, cruise control, and a stereo system) was extended to SE models. The optional three-speed automatic in the E coupe was dropped and gained an optional 4-speed automatic, shared with other models.

=== Facelift ===
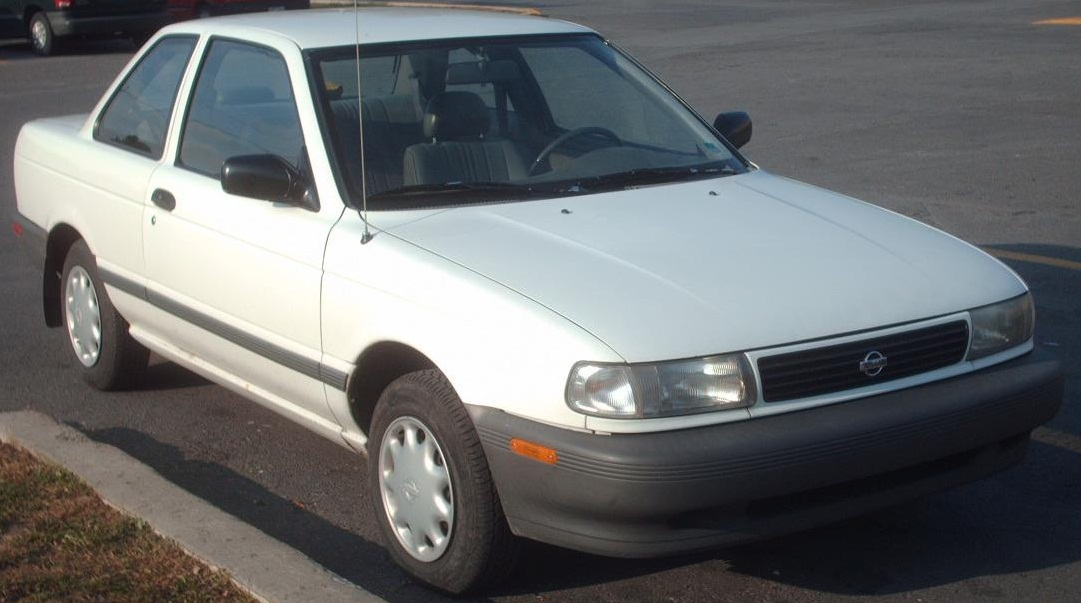
Nissan Sentra 2-door Sedan in Canada

From August 1992 production, the B13 received a facelift for the 1993 model year, with revised front and rear fascias. A driver's airbag was also made standard on the GXE and was available optionally on other models for 1993. An XE Limited model was added for both the coupe and sedan.

For 1994 models (August 1993 production), a CFC-free refrigerant became standard on models equipped with air conditioning. XE models got more standard equipment that included air conditioning, cruise control and a stereo cassette player. The XE Limited was dropped for 1994. In May 1994, a 1994.5 "Limited" model was released as a placeholder for a delayed replacement, due in early 1995.

=== Sentra SE-R ===
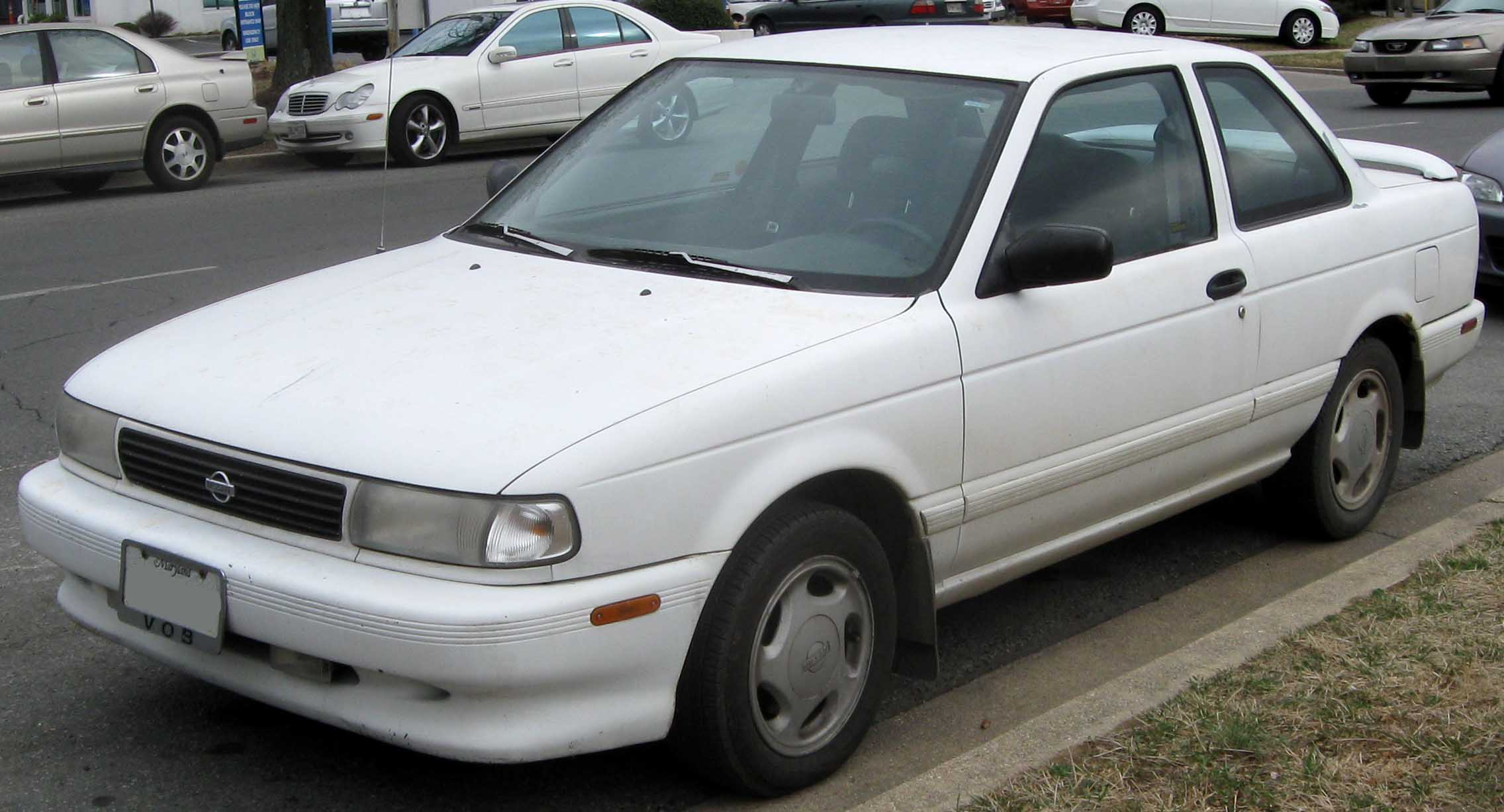
Nissan Sentra SE-R

The B13 used Nissan's SR20DE engine in the sporty two-door SE-R model, offering 140 hp (104.4 kW) at 6400 rpm and 132 lb⋅ft (179 N⋅m) of torque at 4800 rpm—and accelerating from 0 to 60 mph (100 km/h) in 7.6 seconds with a quarter-mile time of 15.8 seconds. Features included 4-wheel disc brakes, MacPherson strut independent suspension, viscous limited-slip differential. The B13 SE-R returned 21 mpg_{‑US} (11 L/100 km; 25 mpg_{‑imp}) city/29 mpg_{‑US} (8.1 L/100 km; 35 mpg_{‑imp}) highway.

=== Philippines ===
The B13 was released in JX, LEC, EX Saloon, Super Saloon and SE Saloon variants. The Super Saloon had all power features. The SE-Saloon came as a Limited edition equipped with four-wheel disc brakes and ABS. Both SE and Super Saloon come standard with the GA16DE.

The B13 Super Saloon and SE Saloon came with the GA16DE fuel-injected engine (top-of-the-line engine for the Philippine market) which is comparable to the U.S Spec B13 SE Limited with loaded options. These models are not equipped with emissions equipment – catalytic converters and sensors as well as EGR. B13s were sold new from 1990 to 2000. The LEC version comes with the standard GA13 carburetted engine as well as the LEC Ps (Power Steering model). The JX comes with the GA14 carburetted engine.

=== Nissan Tsuru GS/V16/Sentra (1992–2017) ===
The Mexican-built Sentra B13 was sold in Mexico for 25 years as well as parts of Asia, Africa, the Middle East, Central America and South America. It is known as the Nissan Tsuru in Mexico, Nissan V16 in Chile, Sentra B13 in Central and South American countries, and Sentra Clásico in Peru and the Dominican Republic. Tsuru vehicles destined for the Mexican market were modified by Nissan Mexicana specifically for the Mexican market and for the most part are identical to the 1991 model except for a new Renault-sourced clutch/transmission, updated Mexican-made electronic systems and minor cosmetic and ergonomic upgrades.

The Tsuru was the most popular car in Mexico from 1997 until 2011 when it was surpassed by the Mexican-made Volkswagen Jetta. The Middle East/African export market version is the same basic car only with minor cosmetic changes and mechanical downgrades to make it cheaper, such as non-power steering, downgraded interior trim, a downgraded braking system, and a mechanical clutch instead of a hydraulic one.

Vehicles sold in the Middle East region are not equipped with catalytic converters to make the car cheaper to build. Because of the lack of the catalytic converter, the vehicles are illegal in Mexico and South America. More recent models have received a Renault-built hydraulic clutch and an optional catalytic converter. Its affordable price, relatively good fuel economy, easy servicing and ease of finding spare parts for it made it popular among local taxi drivers and low income families in Mexico, South America, Central America, and the Caribbean. The Tsuru is commonly used in the taxicab livery in Mexico as a replacement for the VW Beetle. Due to stricter automobile safety regulations which came into effect in Mexico from 2019, production of the Tsuru was discontinued in May 2017 since the Tsuru lacked both anti-lock brakes and airbags. A special commemorative edition limited to 1000 cars went on sale in March 2017, by which time 1,849,289 third generation Tsurus had been built in Mexico.

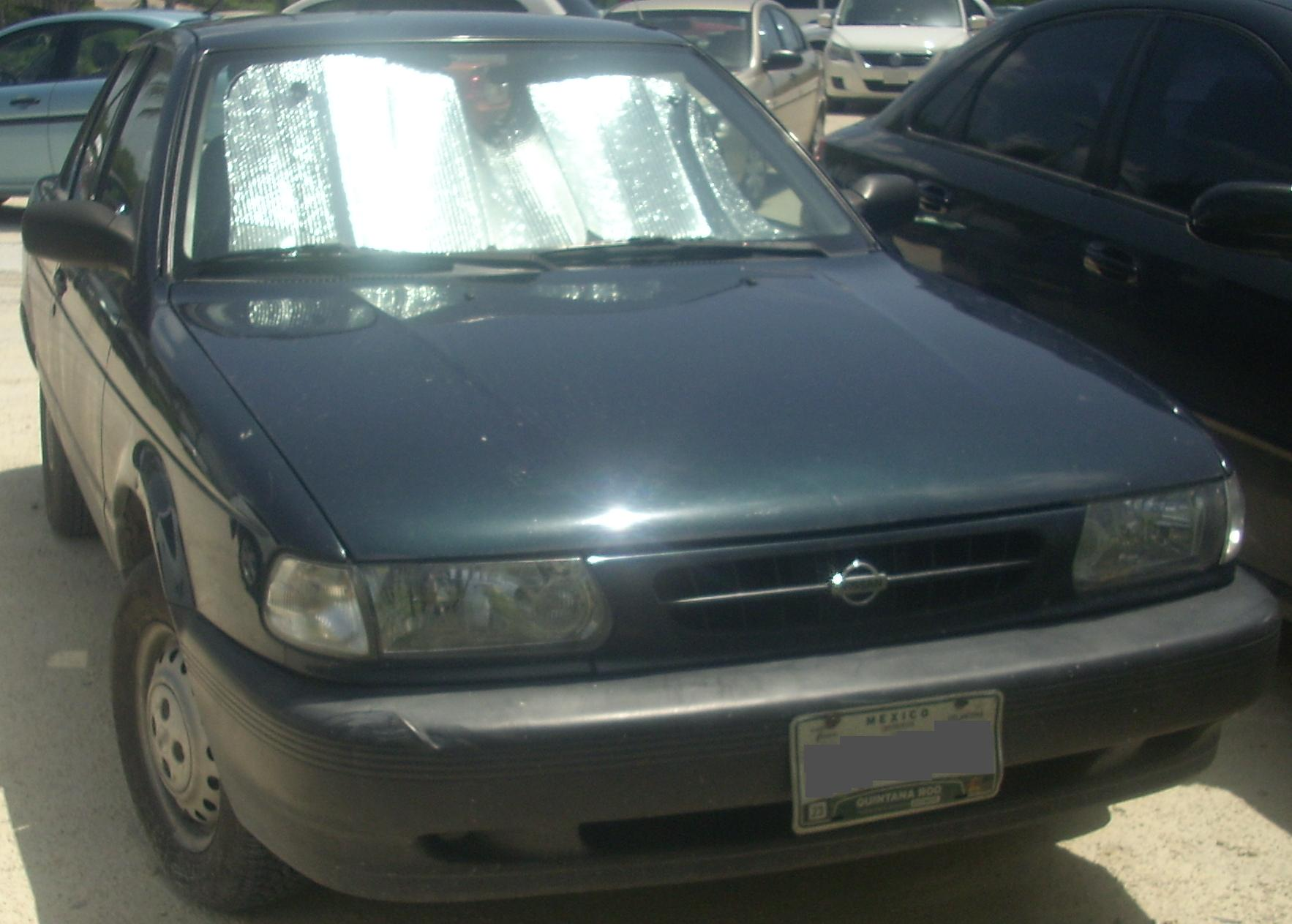
Pre-facelift B13 Nissan Tsuru

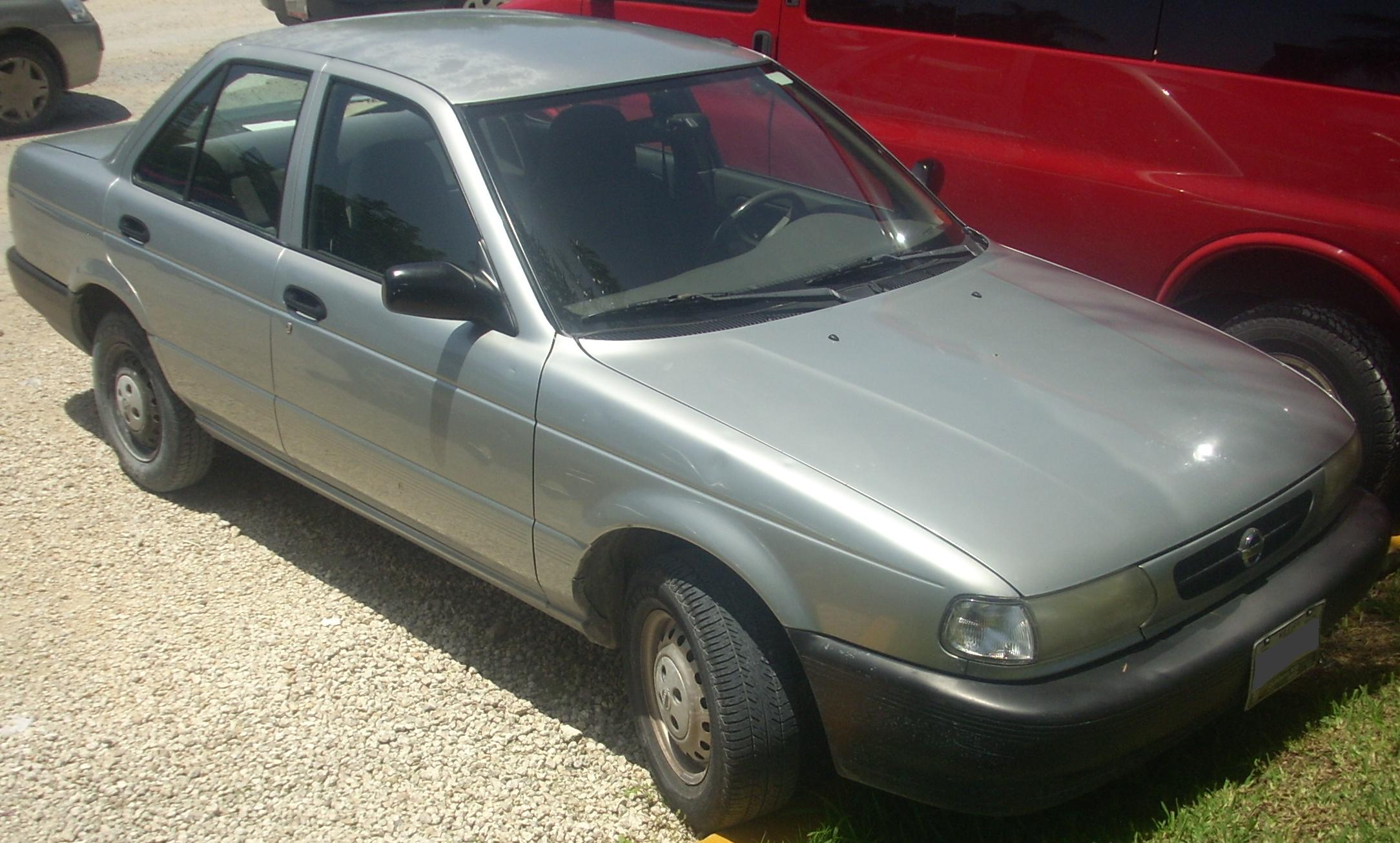
2002–2004 Nissan Tsuru

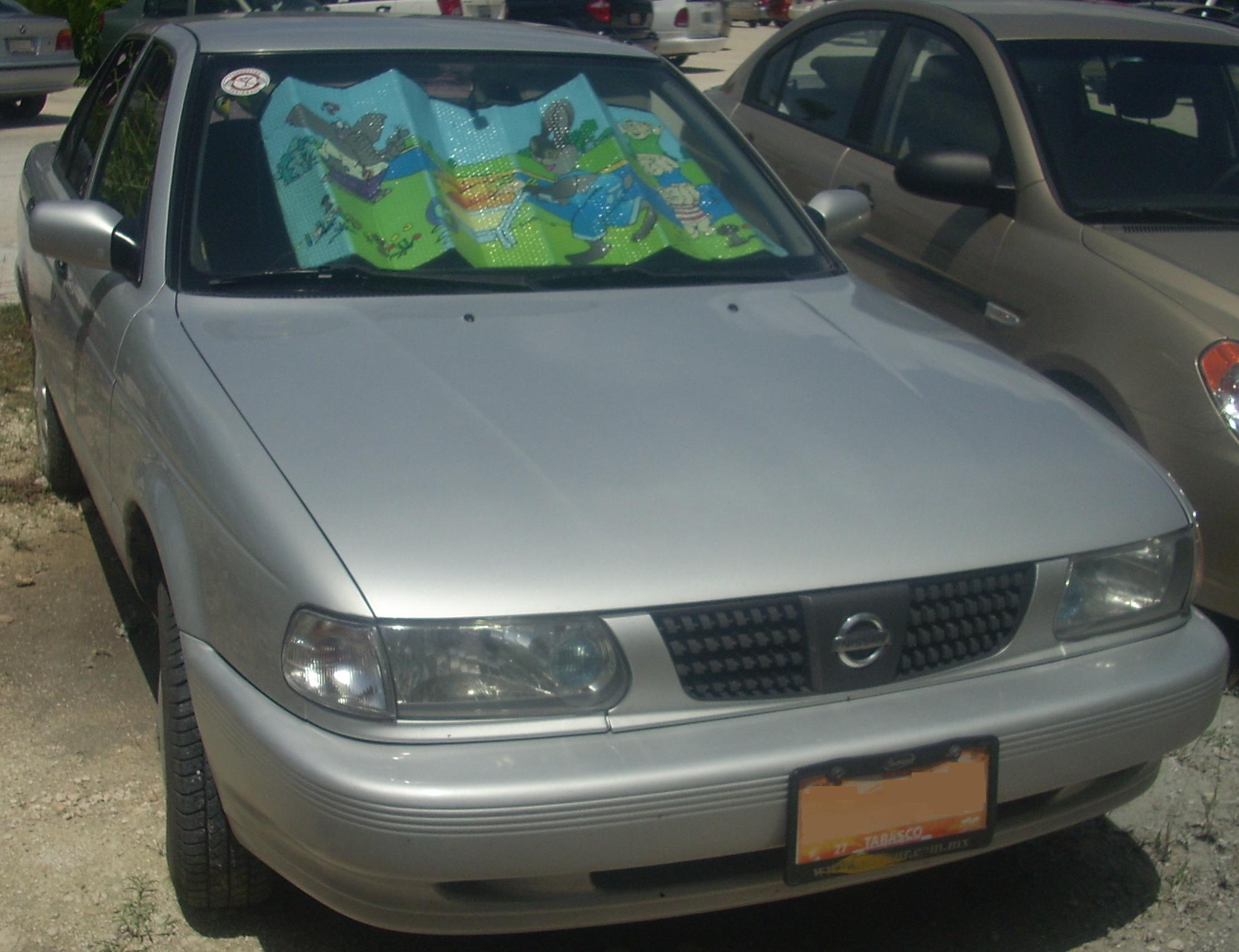
2005–2017 Nissan Tsuru

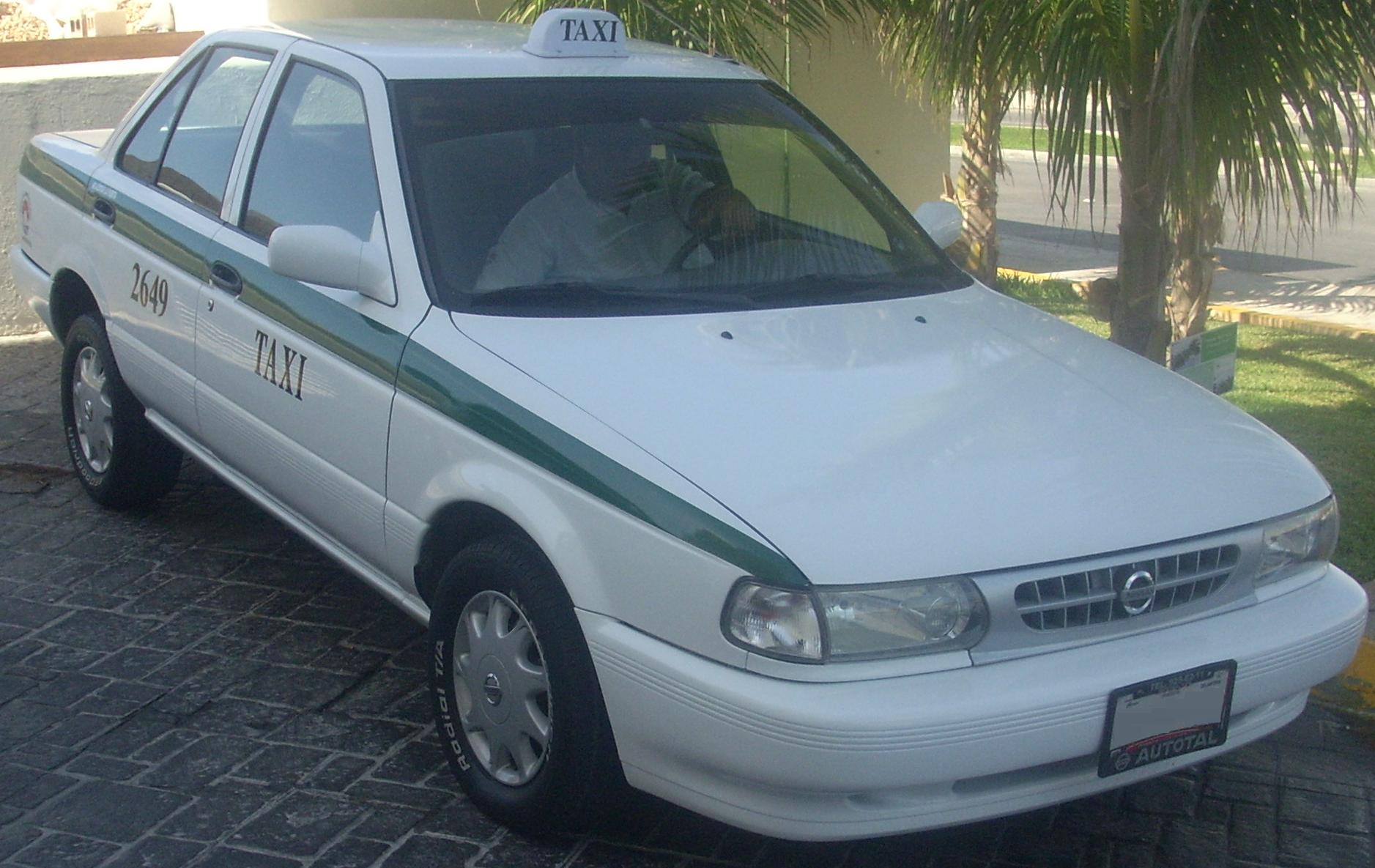
Nissan Tsuru taxi in Cancún

==== Safety ====
The Tsuru/Sentra in its most basic configuration with no airbags for Latin America received 0 stars for adult occupants and 0 stars for infants from Latin NCAP 1.0 in 2013.

Latin NCAP 1.5 test results Nissan Tsuru / Sentra B13 – NO Airbags (2013, similar to Euro NCAP 2002)
Test	Points	Stars
Adult occupant:	1.00/17.0	0 /5 stars
Child occupant:	0.00/49.00	0 /5 stars

In October 2016, the Insurance Institute for Highway Safety (IIHS), Latin NCAP, and Global NCAP jointly performed a 50 percent overlap test with a 2015 Tsuru against its modern counterpart, a 2016 Versa. In the test, both cars were traveling at 40 miles per hour (64 km/h) before impact; the Tsuru buckled upon impact, compromising the cabin to the extent where the steering column and dashboard are thrusted onto the driver's torso as well as the driver's head fatally striking the deformed A-pillar, while the Versa's front clip absorbed the brunt of the impact and its cabin remained intact, protecting the driver.

== Fourth generation (B14; 1995) ==
Fourth generation
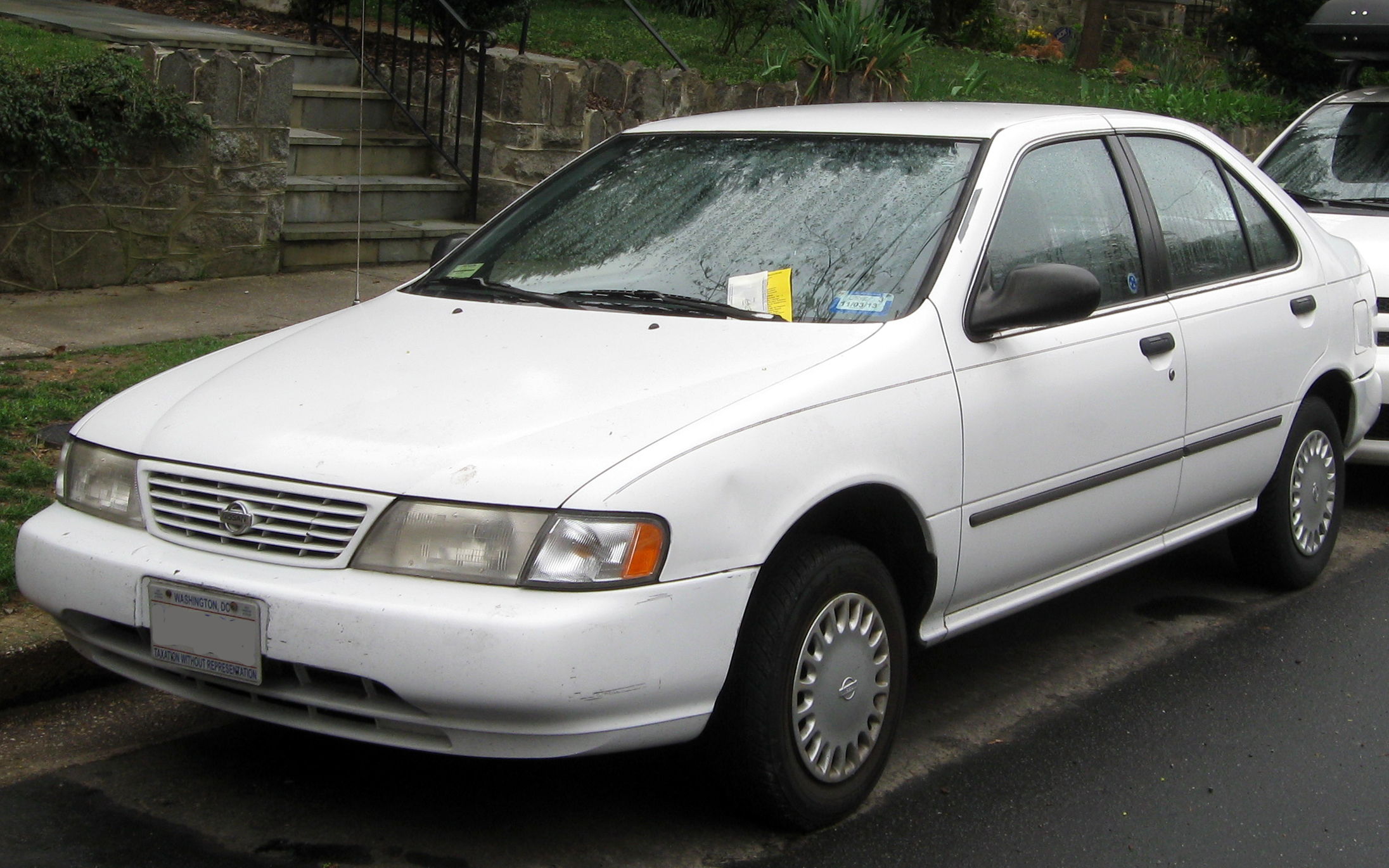

Overview
- Model code: B14
- Also called: Nissan Sunny (B14); Nissan Lucino/200SX; Nissan Presea
- Production: January 1995 – December 1999; 1995–2002 (Philippines)
- Model years: 1995–1999
- Assembly: Japan: Oppama Plant, Yokosuka, Kanagawa; United States: Smyrna, Tennessee; Mexico: Aguascalientes; Taiwan: Miaoli (Yulon); Philippines: Makati (April 1995 – July 1998); Santa Rosa, Laguna (August 1998 – May 2002); Malaysia: Kuala Lumpur
- Designer: Jerry Hirshberg (1992)

Body and chassis
- Body style: 4-door sedan
- Layout: Front-engine, front-wheel-drive
- Platform: Nissan B platform
- Related: Nissan 200SX; Nissan Sunny (B14); Nissan Presea (R11)

Powertrain
- Engine: 1.6 L GA16DE I4; 2.0 L SR20DE I4
- Transmission: 5-speed manual; 4-speed automatic

Dimensions
- Wheelbase: 99.8 in (2,535 mm)
- Length: 170.1–171.0 in (4,321–4,343 mm)
- Width: 66.6 in (1,692 mm)
- Height: 54.5 in (1,384 mm)

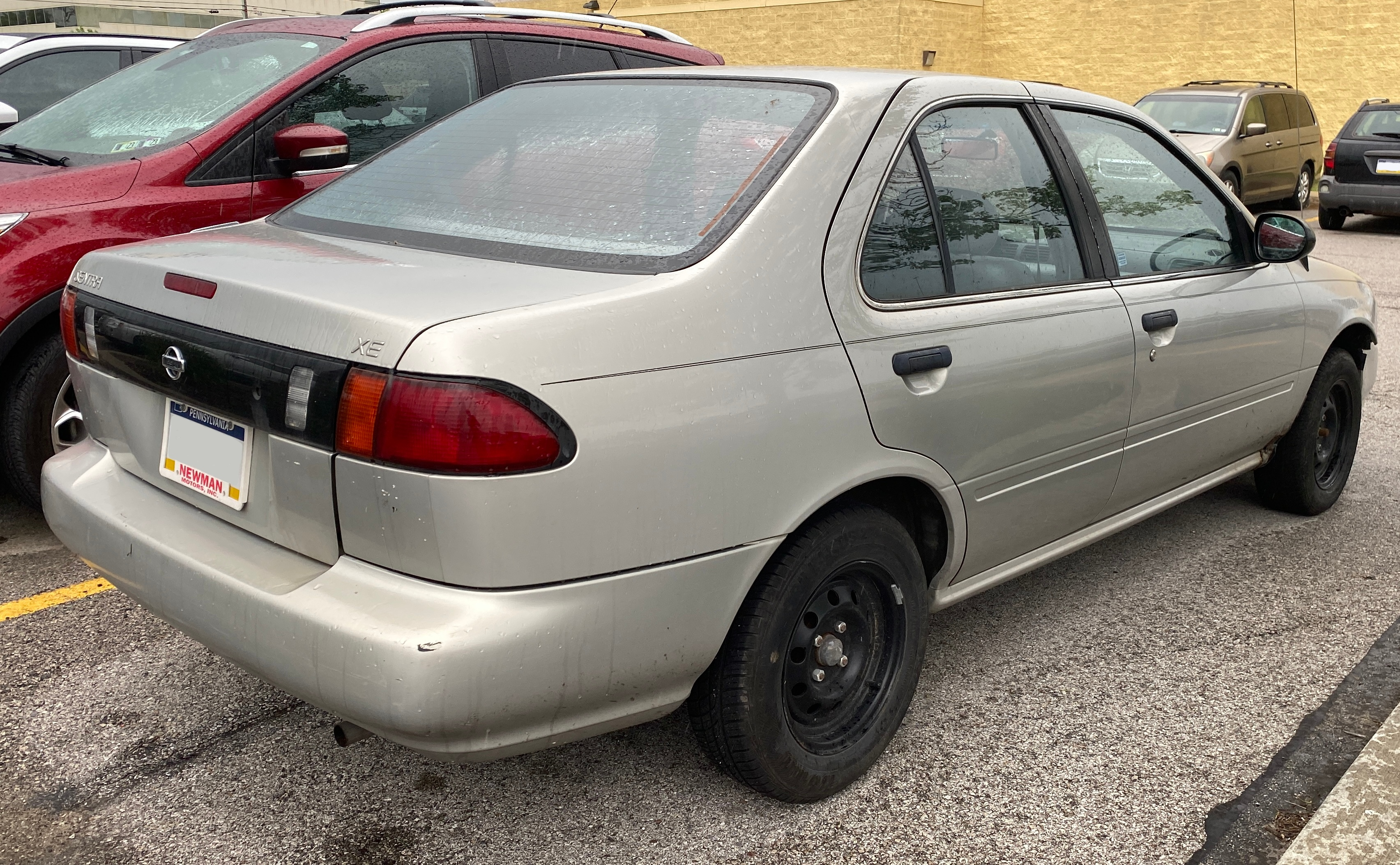
1996 Nissan Sentra XE (US)

Introduced on January 5, 1995, the Sentra changed from an independent rear suspension to a torsion beam setup. Some variants were not equipped with a rear swaybar or rear disc brakes. Many of these vehicles equipped with the 1.6-liter DOHC engine that had Nissan's Variable Intake Valve Timing Control System (NVTCS) and standard 5-speed manual transmission can achieve upwards of 30–40 MPG depending on conditions. This generation is also the first generation in Mexico wearing the Sentra name. It is also the first Sentra generation exclusively sold in sedan form, as the coupe was dropped in favor of the Nissan 200SX reintroduction. The revived 200SX also replaced the related Nissan NX.

All engines in the B14 line up came with timing chains, designed to last the vehicle's lifetime.

The B14 Sentra platform was offered in several trims, starting in 1995 with the Base, XE, GXE, and GLE. The Base and XE came with 13-inch steel wheels with hubcaps and had a minor redesign to the rear light assembly. The GXE and up came with rear seat trunk access, rear headrests, a grip-assist handle on the passenger side, additional fabric on doors and seats instead of vinyl, and power windows, locks, mirrors, etc. These trims continued unchanged until 1998 with the introduction of the SE trim in between GXE and GLE. The SE trim got all the performance parts (minus the limited-slip differential). The GLE, SE, and Special Edition include in some instances leather, rear spoiler and moonroof, and keyless entry packages. This generation saw the end of assembly in Smyrna, Tennessee.

The 1998 model year also saw a minor redesign of the rear light assembly, primarily the reverse indicator lights. The front grille was changed from horizontal bars to a large plastic mesh. The GXE was upgraded to include 14-inch alloy wheels, the GLE also came with 14-inch wheels, and the SE and Special editions along with the 200SX SE-R came with 15-inch alloy rims, leather-wrapped steering wheel, shift knob and even Limited-Slip-Differential until 1997. The GLE and Base trims were removed by 1999, leaving the XE trim as the new base model and SE as the top of the line. A limited edition GXE trim was released. The front grille was redesigned again to an oval slot set low between the headlights.

All trims except the SE and SE-R have the GA16DE 1.6 L engine producing 115 hp (86 kW) and 108 pound-feet (146 N⋅m). It was a DOHC design with a 6,900 rpm redline and 115 hp (86 kW) at 6,000 rpm, 110 lb.ft at 4,000 rpm, available in 5-speed manual/4-speed automatic; 30/40mpg 5sp. man., 28/37 4sp. auto. It had an Acceleration of 0–60 mph in 8.5 seconds for a manual 1995 GXE. The SE and SE-R received the SR20DE 2.0L engine with DOHC with a 7,300 rpm redline and 140 hp (100 kW) at 6,400 rpm, 132 lb.ft 4,800 140 hp (104 kW). These models achieved 23/31mpg 5-speed manual, 23/30 4-speed automatic, 0–60 mph in 8.1 seconds.

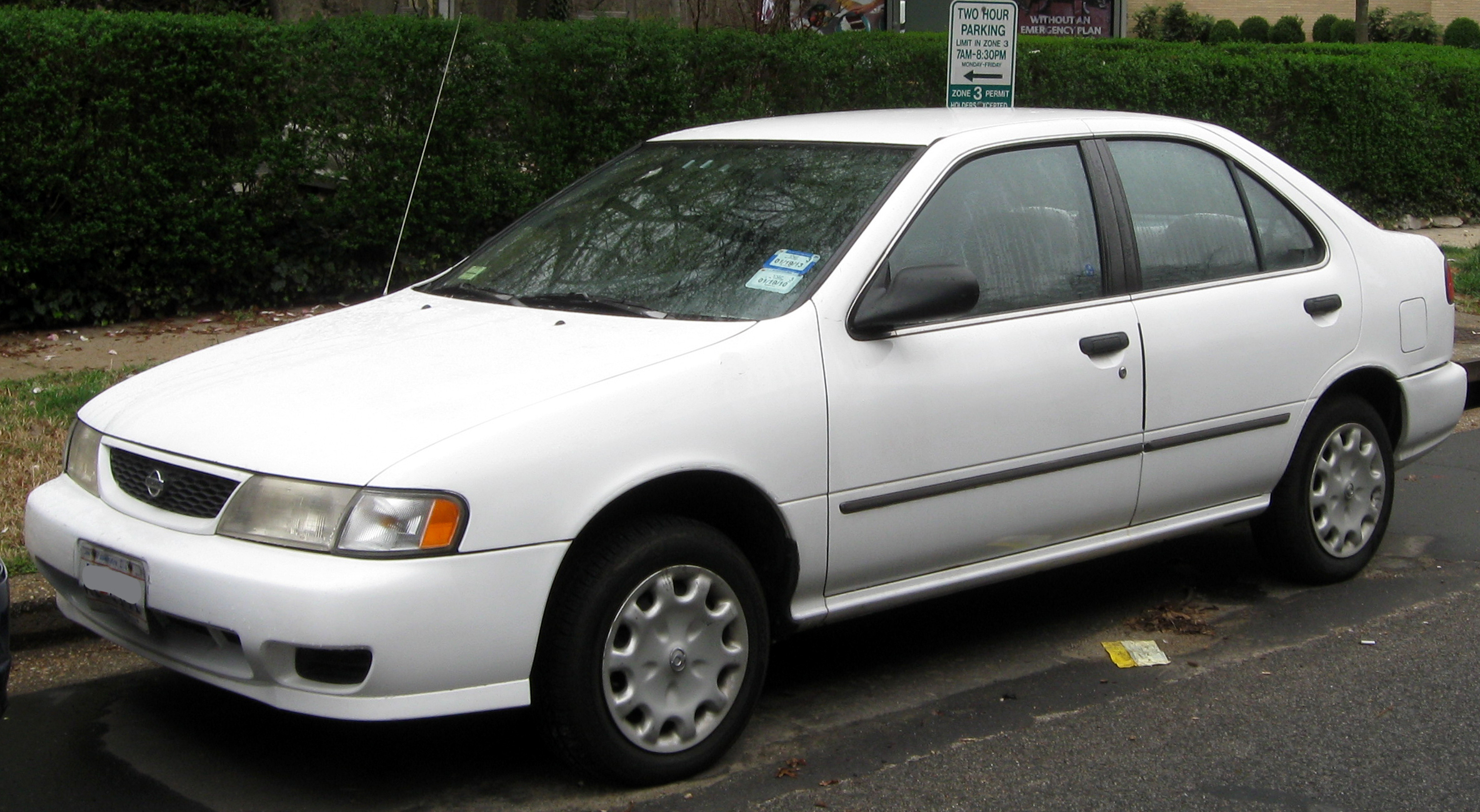
1998 Nissan Sentra GXE (US)

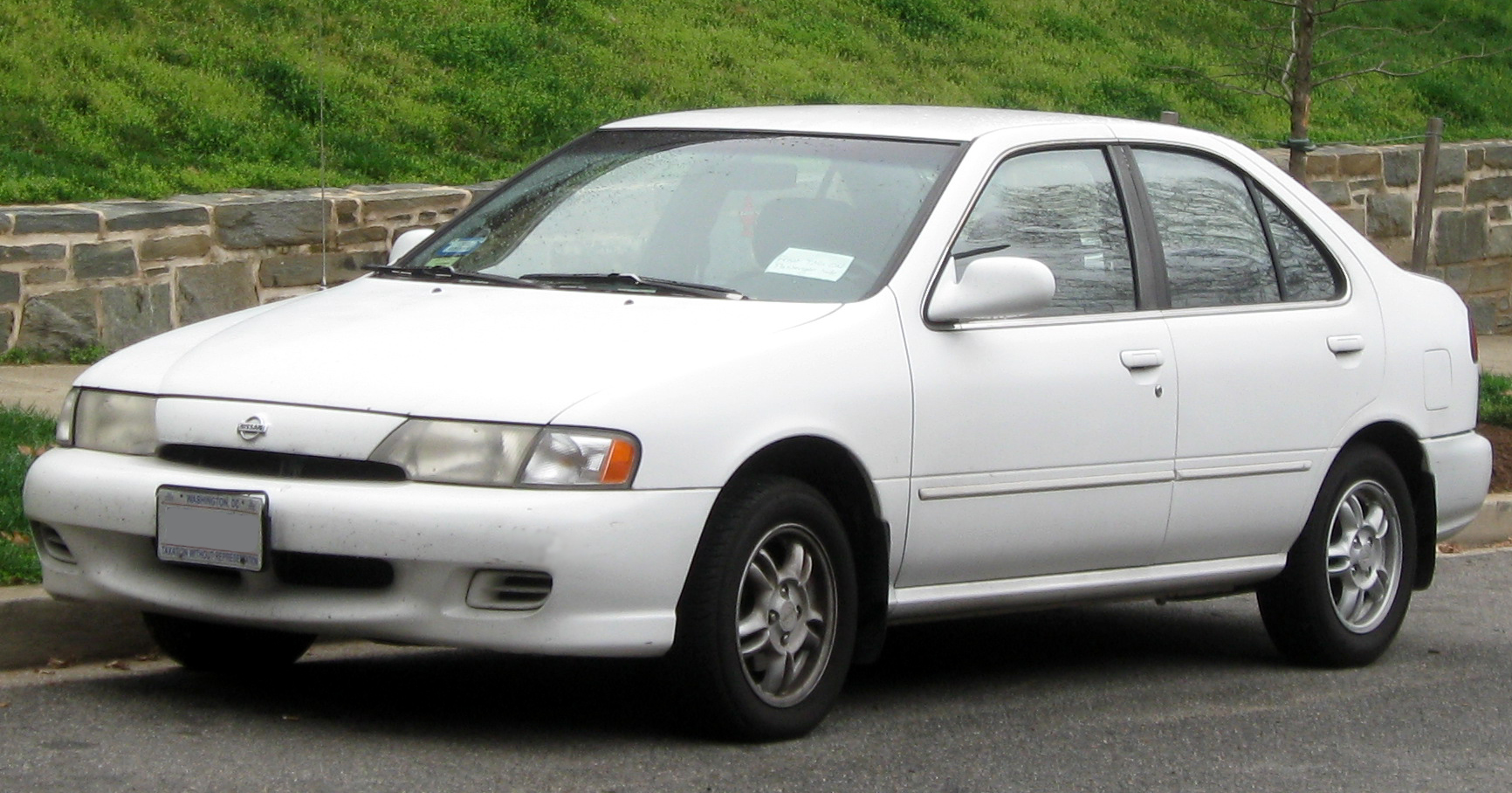
1999 Nissan Sentra GXE (US)

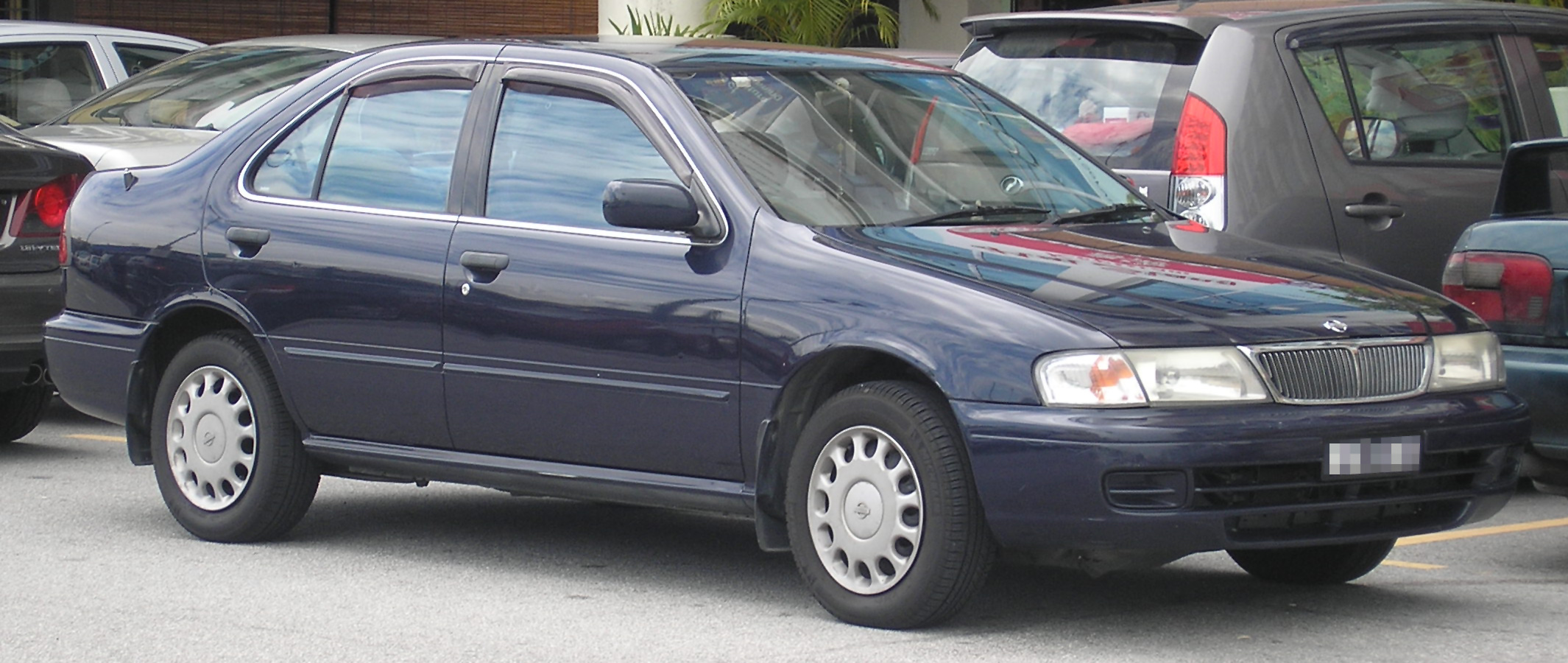
Nissan Sentra EX Super Saloon (Malaysia)

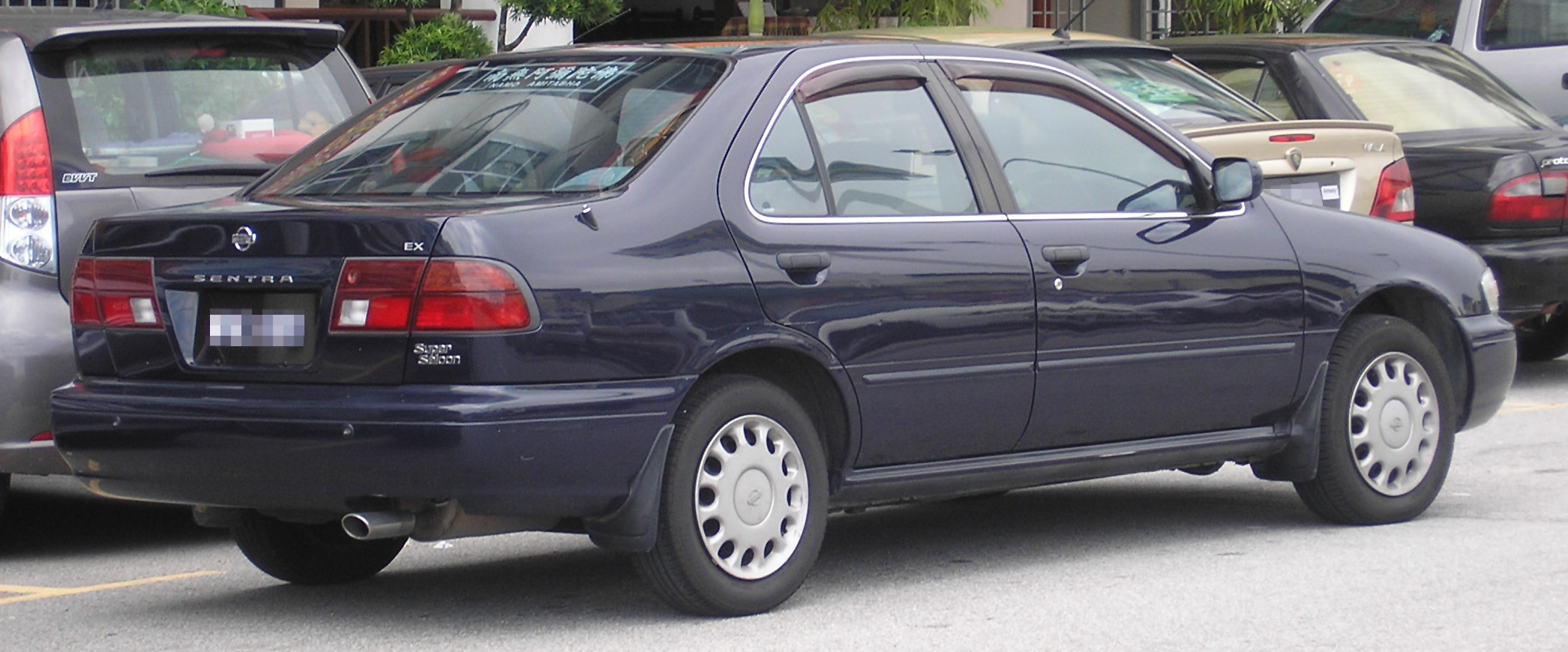
Nissan Sentra EX Super Saloon (Malaysia)

=== Philippine version ===
The B14 platform was released in 7 trims in the Philippines from 1995–2002: FE, EX Saloon, Super Saloon, Super Touring, GTS, Exalta SLA and Exalta STA. The FE used a GA13DS DOHC 16-valve carburetor 1,295 cc engine. The trim only came with power steering and had no stereo. The EX Saloon came with a GA14DE DOHC 16-valve EFI 1,392 cc engine. This trim now included a stereo.

The Super Saloon and up used the GA16DNE DOHC 16-valve EFI 1,597 cc engine. The Super Saloon introduced all power features including a power antenna. Auto retract mirrors, SRS airbags, and ABS were optional, but later became mandatory on all units.

Due to the success of the Super Saloon, Nissan Philippines introduced the Super Touring and GTS, to compete with the Toyota Corolla TRD (limited edition) and 160 hp Honda Civic SiR sedan. The Super Touring was sold with a sportier bodykit (Lucino bumpers with foglights, sideskirt, spoiler) and the GTS, its successor, had equal offerings.

Nissan Philippines then repackaged the Sentra to a more luxurious line up in order to compete with the Toyota Corolla Altis, leading to the creation of the Exalta SLA and STA trims. The SLA came with reinforced extended bumpers, multi-reflector headlamps, elm wood interior accents, all power features, power steering, power windows, rear backup sensors, sapphire starlight gauges, and with a manual transmission. The STA had luxurious version of the SLA with all power features, power steering, elm wood interior, power windows, all leather seats and door panels, power sliding sunroof, automatic climate control, 2-DIN stereo with 12-Disc CD Changer, fog lights, 4 channel 4 sensor ABS, tilt and slide sunroof, retracting rear door window shades, and sapphire starlight gauges.

== Fifth generation (B15; 1999) ==
Fifth generation
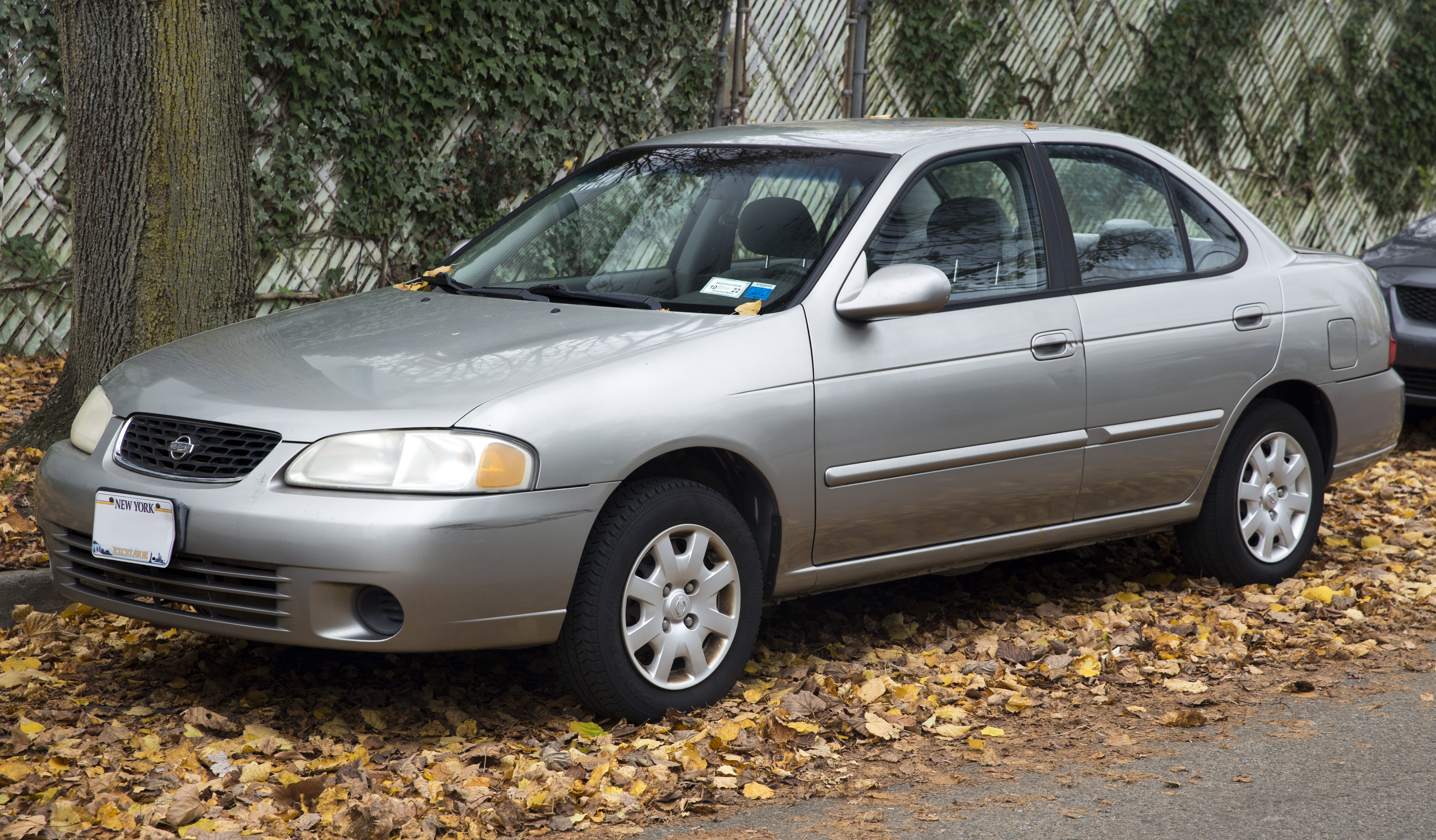

Overview
- Model code: B15
- Production: November 1999 – August 2006
- Model years: 2000–2006 (North America)
- Assembly: Mexico: Aguascalientes
- Designer: Jerry Hirshberg (1997)

Body and chassis
- Body style: 4-door sedan
- Layout: Front-engine, front-wheel-drive
- Platform: Nissan MS platform

Powertrain
- Engine: 1.8 L QG18DE I4 (2000–2006); 2.0 L SR20DE I4 (2000–2001); 2.5 L QR25DE I4 (2002–2006)
- Transmission: 4-speed RE4F03B automatic (1.8L, 2.0L); 5-speed RS5F70A manual (1.8L, 2.0L); 4-speed RE4F04B automatic (2.5L); 5-speed RS5F51A manual (2.5L); 6-speed RS6F51H manual (2.5L)

Dimensions
- Wheelbase: 99.8 in (2,535 mm)
- Length: 177.5 in (4,508 mm)
- Width: 67.3 in (1,709 mm)
- Height: 55.5 in (1,410 mm)
- Curb weight: 2,513 lb (1,140 kg)

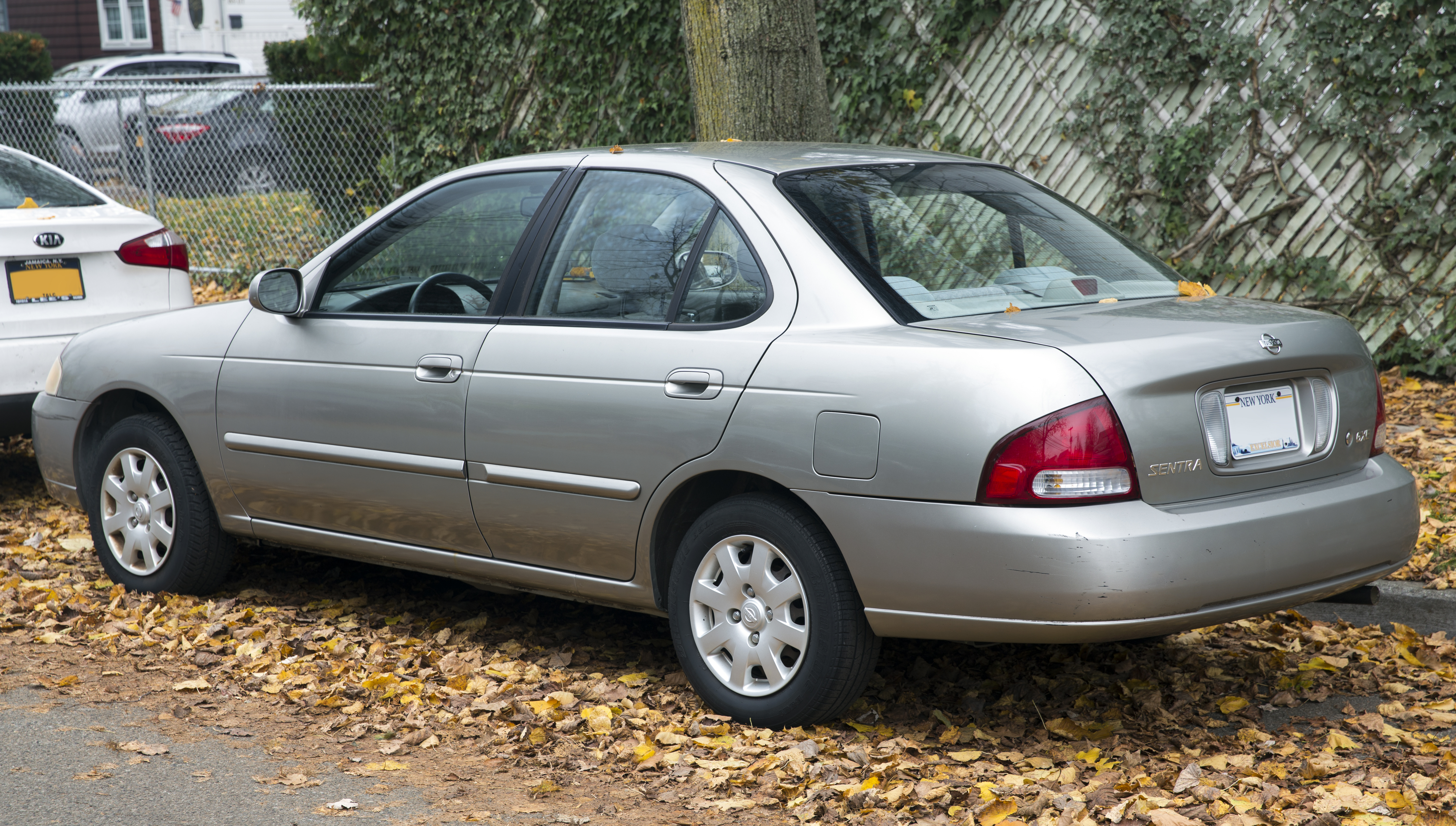
Rear view (2002)

The Sentra finally crossed over into the "compact" class when the redesigned model launched in February 2000 as a 2000 model. When new, this redesign was considered a substantial upgrade compared to the "cheap" economy car it replaced. Previously, the compact class had been occupied by the Altima, which moved to the mid-size class in 2001, and its wheelbase remained unchanged from the previous generation. While earlier Sentras were very similar to their Japan-market B-series Nissan Sunny twins, the B15 Sentra diverged greatly from the B15 Sunny (Nissan Super Sunny). Production shifted from Smyrna, Tennessee to Aguascalientes, Mexico, and the Smyrna production line was retooled to build the Nissan Xterra. With the arrival of this generation, Sentras for the US market were no longer made in Japan. The 2000–2001 Sentra SE with the SR20DE roller rocker motor, which has 145 hp (108 kW) and 136 lb⋅ft (184 N⋅m) of torque, occupied the top-of-the-line Sentra until the SE-R returned for model year 2002. The 1.6-liter GA16DE engine was dropped in favor of the 1.8 L QG18DE (1769 cc), rated at 126 hp (94 kW) and 129 lb⋅ft (175 N⋅m). In Brazil, this engine generated 115 PS (85 kW; 113 hp) at 5,600 rpm and 15.8 kg⋅m (155 N⋅m; 114 lb⋅ft) at 4,400 rpm. Numerous upgrades were made over the previous generation. The new model featured a new interior with higher quality plastics and more comfortable seats. The exterior was also substantially updated and now featured body-side moldings and clear headlights. The curb weight on the QG18DE-engined Sentra is 2,513 lb (1,140 kg). With the introduction of the B15 in year 2000, Nissan also introduced a CA 'Clean Air' trim only available in California. The CA trim boasts a double walled exhaust, three catalytic converters, quick catalyst warm up, and a radiator that has a special coating which actually changes ground level ozone (smog) into oxygen. The Sentra CA model is the only gasoline-fueled vehicle in the world to receive California Air Resources Board (CARB) super ultra low emission vehicle (SULEV) certification and obtain zero-emission credits.

In markets where the B15 Sentra or Sunny was not sold, Nissan usually sold a similar car called the Nissan Bluebird Sylphy (G10/N16) in Japan but under other names elsewhere. In Europe, the Bluebird Sylphy was known as the Nissan Almera (N16) and Australia and New Zealand as the Nissan Pulsar (N16). The G10/N16 is constructed on the same platform as the B15 and features the same interior and engines.

=== SE-R ===
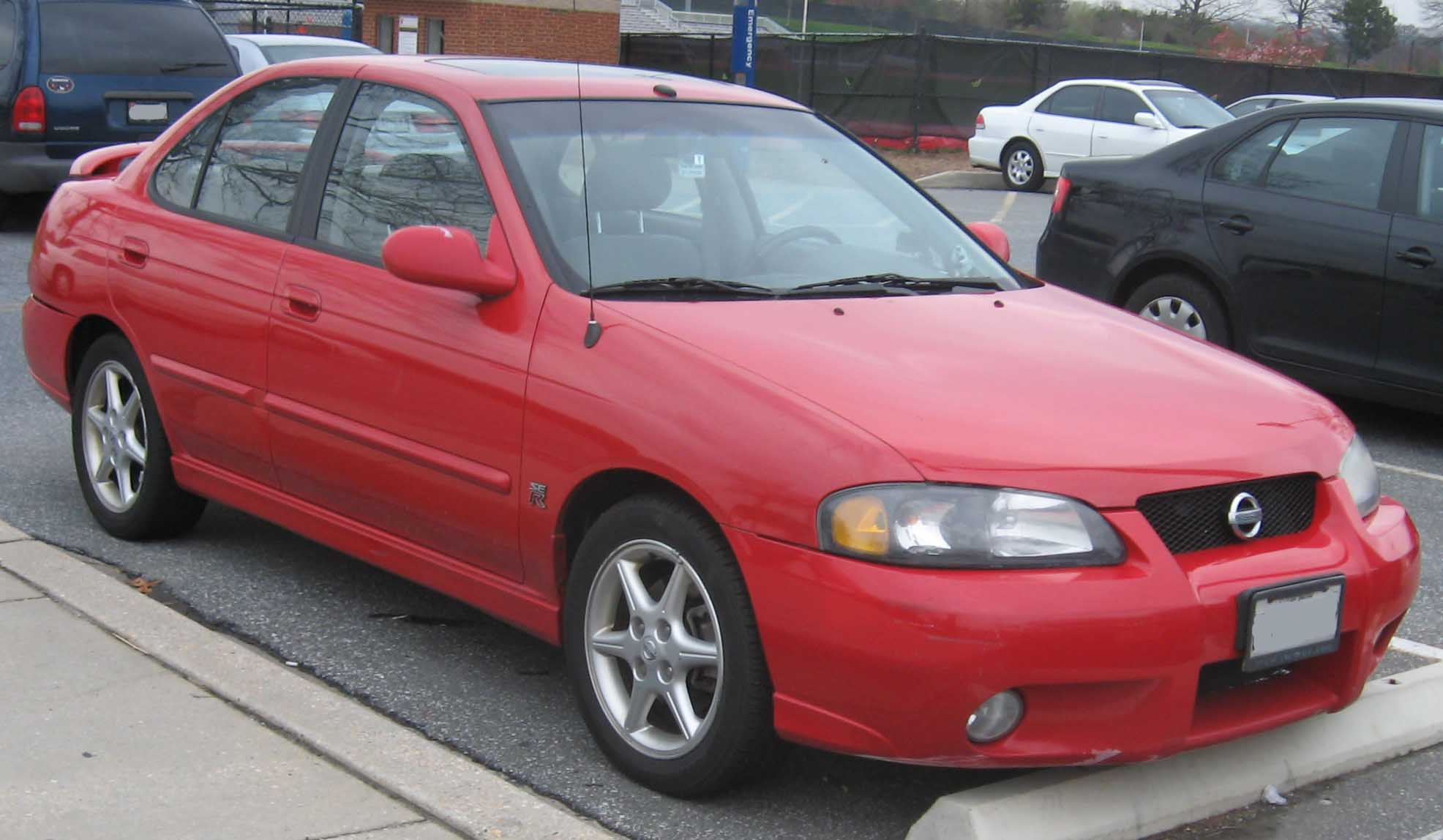
2002–2003 Nissan Sentra SE-R

For the 2002 model year, a new SE-R was introduced powered by the 2.5-liter QR25DE 165 hp (123 kW) and 175 pound-feet (237 N⋅m) 4-cylinder. The SE-R came with either a 5-speed RS5F51A manual transmission or an optional 4-speed automatic. The 5-speed manual was dropped in 2003+ models, which made the 4-speed automatic the only transmission choice for the SE-R.

A more aggressive front fascia was added thanks to a Nissan Skyline inspired front bumper for 2002 models. Black housing headlights, fog-lights, side skirts, a rear spoiler, a dual-tip muffler, and 16" aluminum-alloy wheels were also standard. This trim also featured a sport-tuned suspension, leather-wrapped steering wheel, and beige sport cloth seats.

=== SE-R Spec V ===
The Nissan Sentra SE-R Spec V was the more performance oriented sport compact version of the Nissan Sentra. Its engine (also shared with the SE-R) was the same 2.5-liter QR25DE unit originally created for the Nissan Altima and Frontier pickups. Power output from the Spec V's QR25 increased to 175 hp (130 kW) at 6,000 rpm and 180 lb⋅ft (244 N⋅m) of torque at 4,500 rpm when using premium fuel. It is mated to a six-speed RS6F51H manual transmission and a helical limited-slip differential; which served as the only transmission available on the Spec V.

The car's handling was aided with more aggressive tuning of the car's suspension (when compared to lower trim models) and the addition of low-profile 215/45ZR 17-inch Continental ContiSport Contact tires and 17x7-inch wheels. A front strut tower brace, firmer springs, revised shock damping, firmer front polyurethane bushings, dual-tip muffler, and front stabilizer bars were all standard. A four-wheel anti-lock braking system (which was packaged with front-seat side-impact air bags) was also optional equipment on all 2002–2006 models. Specific to the 2004–2006 model years; potential buyers could also purchase a 4-piston Brembo brake caliper upgrade.

The Spec V was initially equipped with Red Skyline GT-R inspired front bucket seats (2002 model year only) and a leather-wrapped steering wheel. Other optional features included a Rockford Fosgate 300-watt nine-speaker audio system (with an 8-inch (200 mm) sub woofer in the trunk), six-disc auto-changer, and a power sunroof. Features unique to the Spec V (and SE-R) include more aggressive headlights with black surrounds, standard fog-lights, lower-body sill extensions and a rear spoiler.

Exclusive to the 2002 and 2003 model years, the SE-R & Spec V was given an aggressive front fascia (styled after the Skyline GT-R). Originally, speculation arose surrounding the Spec V designation being a play on the GT-R V-Spec Skyline name. This speculation has been proven to be true with the introduction of the R35 GT-R Spec V in North America. It is also widely speculated that use of the Spec V designation is due to the fact that Nissan cannot use the V-Spec title in the US market, however evidence has yet to surface.

=== 2.5 LE and 2.5 S ===
The QR25DE engine was not exclusive to the SE-R versions of the Sentra, the 2.5L engine was also equipped in the 2003 Sentra 2.5 LE and 2004 Sentra 2.5 S. These versions did not sport any exterior resemblance to the SE-R/Spec V trims; they clone the exterior and interior of the lower trims (GXE, 1.8 S) to include clear headlamps, beige-colored interior cloth, and softer suspension than the SE-R's. The only available transmission was a 4-speed automatic. These models offered the appearance of a standard Sentra coupled with the power of an SE-R.

=== 2004+ model year refresh ===
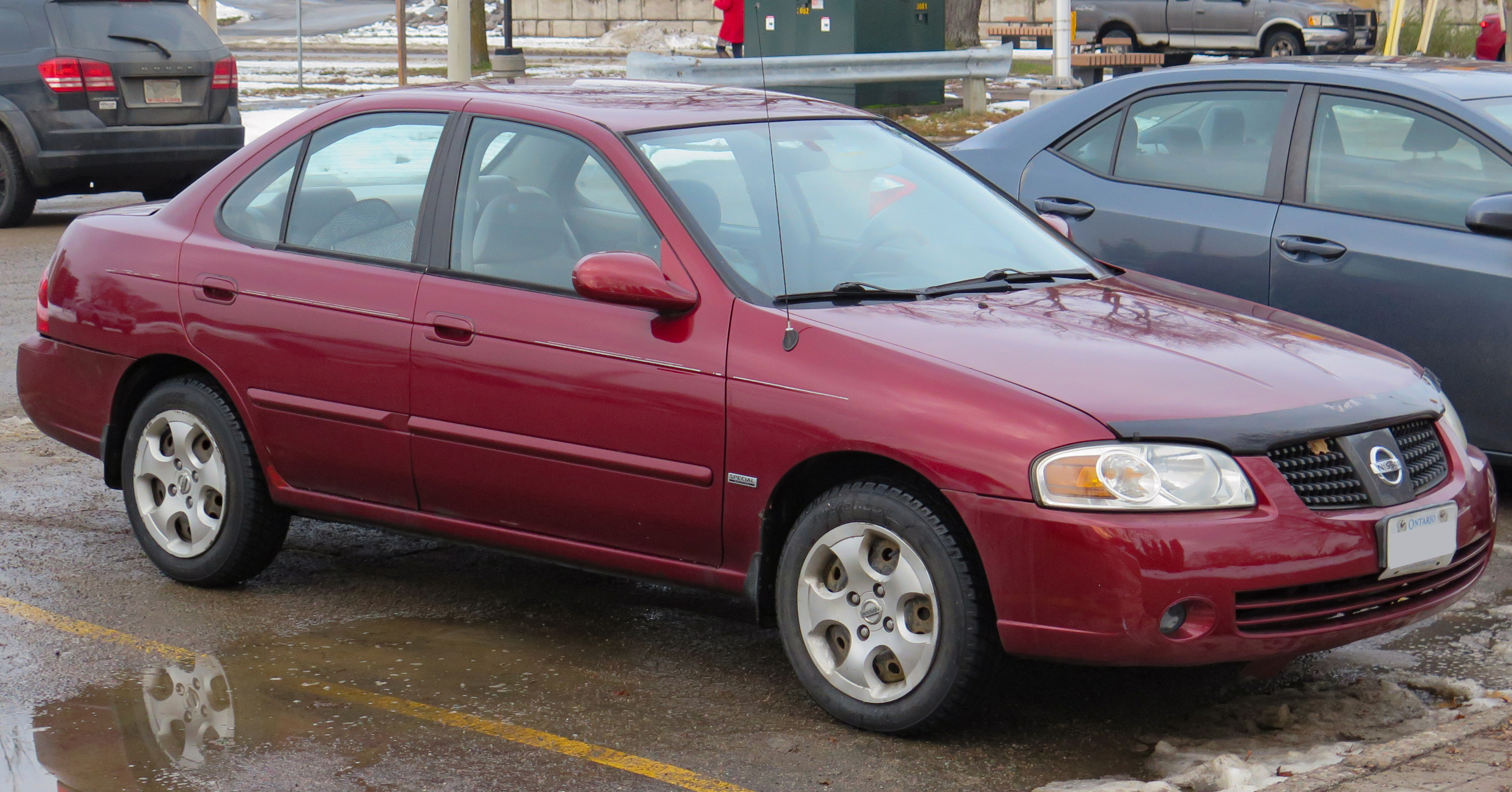

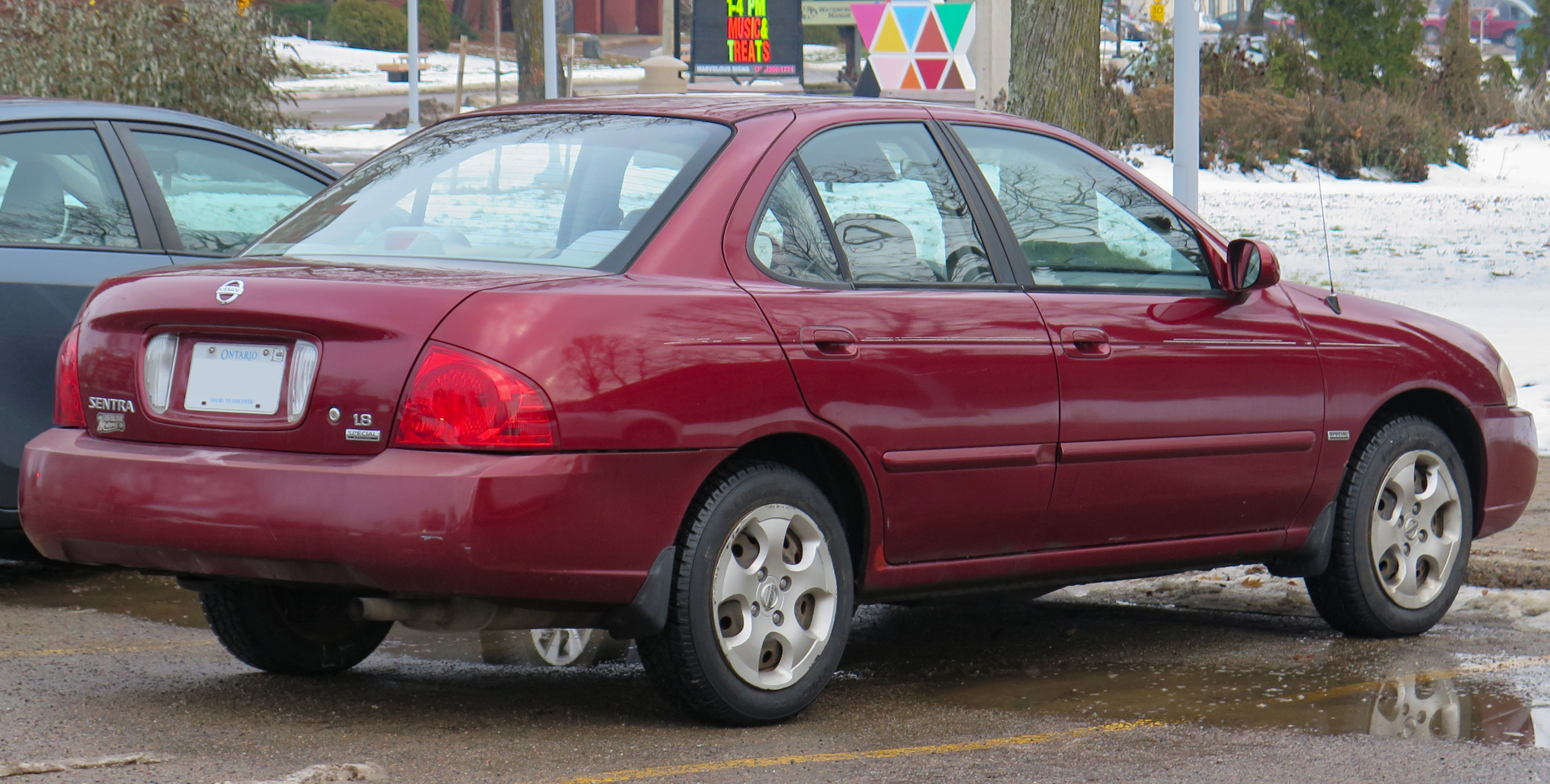
2006 Nissan Sentra 1.8 Special Edition (facelift)

In 2003, Nissan launched the 2004 model year which saw a minor facelift and a build quality uplift for all Sentras; not limited to but including updated headlights, tail lights, squared-off rear bumper, enlarged "bucktooth" front grille, and black faced gauges with orange lighting across all trims.

==== 1.8 Special Edition ====
The Special Edition was produced for model years 2005 and 2006. Exterior features included a rear spoiler, fog lights, SE-R-style front grille, and 16-inch alloy wheels borrowed from the SE-R. Interior features included a 320-watt six-disc Rockford Fosgate nine-speaker sound system, and a charcoal cloth interior and leather-wrapped wheel borrowed from the SE-R model. The only available engine was the QG18DE paired with either a four-speed automatic or a very limited quantity five-speed manual.

==== SE-R/SE-R Spec V ====
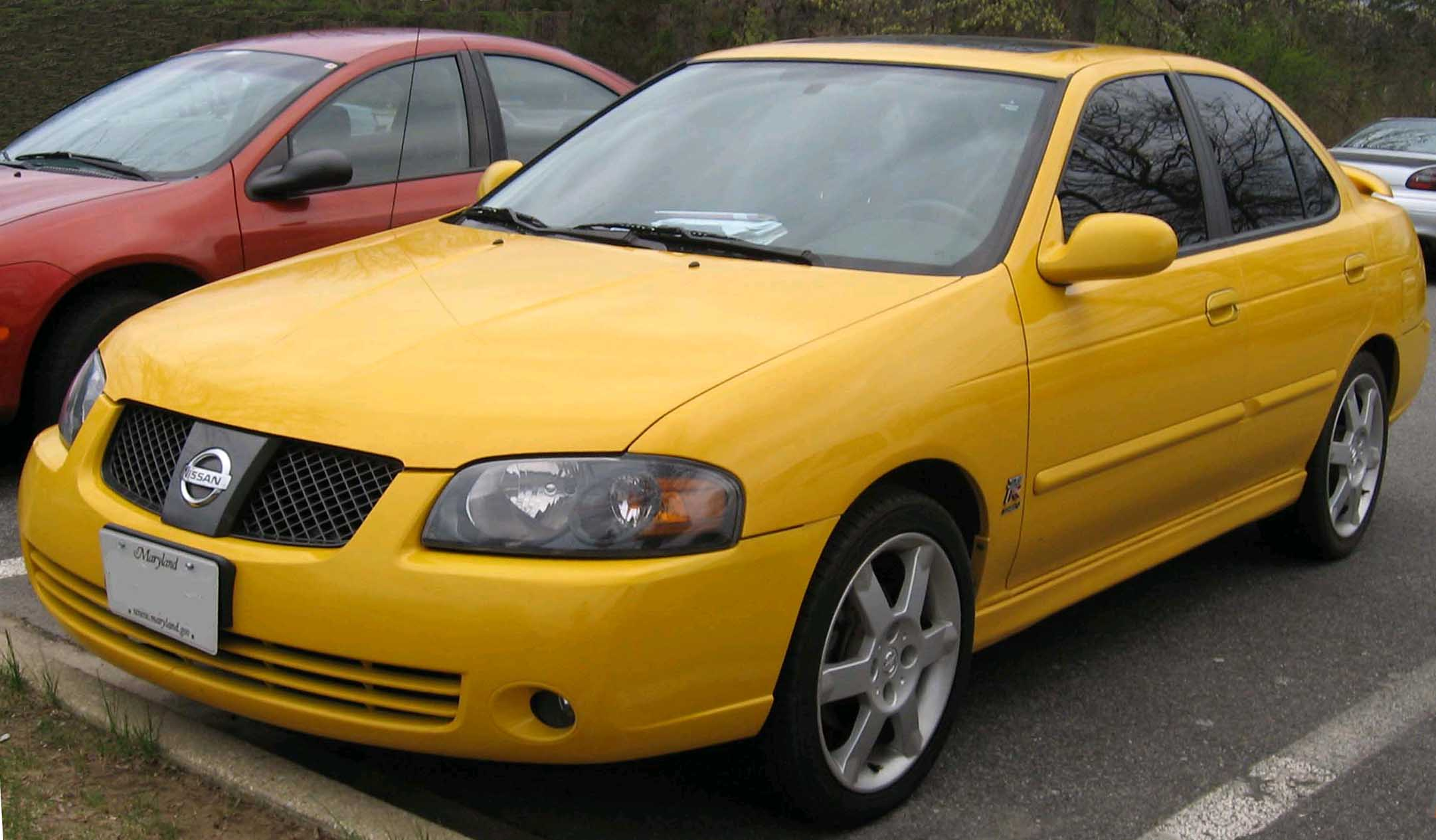
2004–2006 Nissan Sentra SE-R Spec V

Transmission gearing and build quality was improved for the 2004–2006 SE-R Spec V which resulted in a quicker quarter-mile time of 15.2 seconds. The now automatic only SE-R (starting in MY2003) was capable of a quarter-mile time of 16.0 seconds. No significant exterior cosmetic changes were added to differentiate the SE-R model from the Spec V. The SE-R still retained its side-skirt extensions, rear spoiler, black housing headlights but had differing sets of wheels (16-inch wheels on the SE-R were borrowed from the 1.8 Special Edition and 17x7 six-spoke wheels signified the Spec V). The 2004 model year also featured a new style of tail-light which is reminiscent of the Skyline GT-R's quadruple taillights, which notably was a darker shade of red than the 1.8 based Sentra's. Volcanic Orange, an exclusive color for the SE-R and Spec V trim became available for 2004–2006 models.

The interior was also redesigned. Starting in 2005, the SE-R embossed "goose-neck" shifter handle from the previous models was replaced by an all black, leather-stitched ball-top shifter. The two-tone cloth seats found in 2003 and 2004 Spec V models was changed to all-black mesh for the 2005 & 2006 model years.

A big brake option featuring Brembo four-piston calipers up front, 12-inch vented front discs and upgraded 10.9-inch rear discs were available for 2004–2006 Spec V models. ABS was unavailable with this option from the factory.

=== NISMO parts catalog ===
NISMO began offering S-Tune and R-Tune parts upgrades starting the 2004 model year via the NISMO parts catalog. These parts could be either installed by the dealer or the owner.

S-Tune parts included but were not limited to: NISMO stainless cat-back exhaust, springs and shocks, brake pads, a 23mm front anti-roll bar, and 17x7.5" wheels (which were Rays Gram Lights 57c's with NISMO branding – Specifically made for the Sentra).

R-Tune parts were a combination of more aggressive engine, suspension and visual modifications such as: an optional 4-to-1 exhaust manifold, cold-air intake, front lower tie bar and rear 25 mm anti-roll bar, camshafts, suspension hard bushing kit, rear spoiler, and a front and rear under spoiler/lip.

=== Transmissions by trim ===
- The 2000–2001 SE 2.0 L (SR20DE) and 2000–2006 1.8L (QG18DE) had the option of:
  - An automatic 4-speed RE4F03B transmission
  - 5-speed manual RS5F70A
- The 2.5 LE, and 2.5S automatics equipped with the 2.5-liter (QR25DE) used the 4-speed RE4F04B transmission.
- SE-R's were predominantly automatic and used the same RE4F04B transmission as the LE and 2.5S with the exception of the 2002 model year, that year the RS5F51A 5 speed manual open differential transmission was available.
- The 2002–2006 SE-R Spec Vs used the 6-speed RS6F51H transmission with a Helical limited-slip differential (which had at least 2 revisions, 2002 models had different gearing from all the other years).

== Sixth generation (B16; 2006) ==
Sixth generation
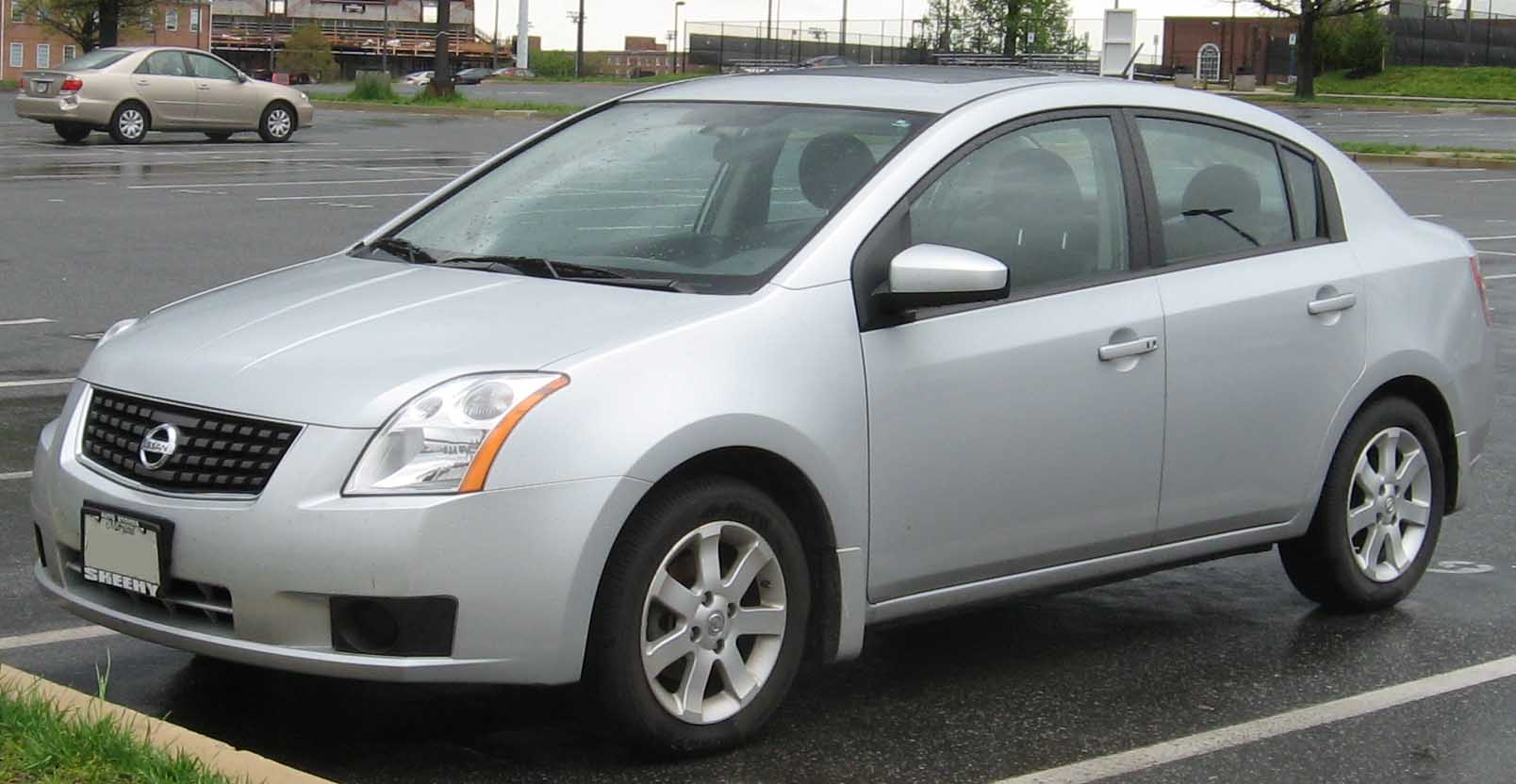

Overview
- Model code: B16
- Also called: Nissan SE
- Production: September 2006 – August 2012
- Model years: 2007–2012 (North America)
- Assembly: Mexico: Aguascalientes

Body and chassis
- Body style: 4-door sedan
- Layout: Front-engine, front-wheel-drive
- Platform: Renault–Nissan C platform
- Related: Nissan X-Trail; Nissan Rogue; Nissan Qashqai; Renault Mégane

Powertrain
- Engine: Gasoline: 2.0 L MR20DE I4; 2.5 L QR25DE I4
- Transmission: 6-speed manual CVT

Dimensions
- Wheelbase: 105.7 in (2,685 mm)
- Length: 179.8–180.1 in (4,567–4,575 mm)
- Width: 70.5 in (1,791 mm)
- Height: 59.1–59.5 in (1,501–1,511 mm)

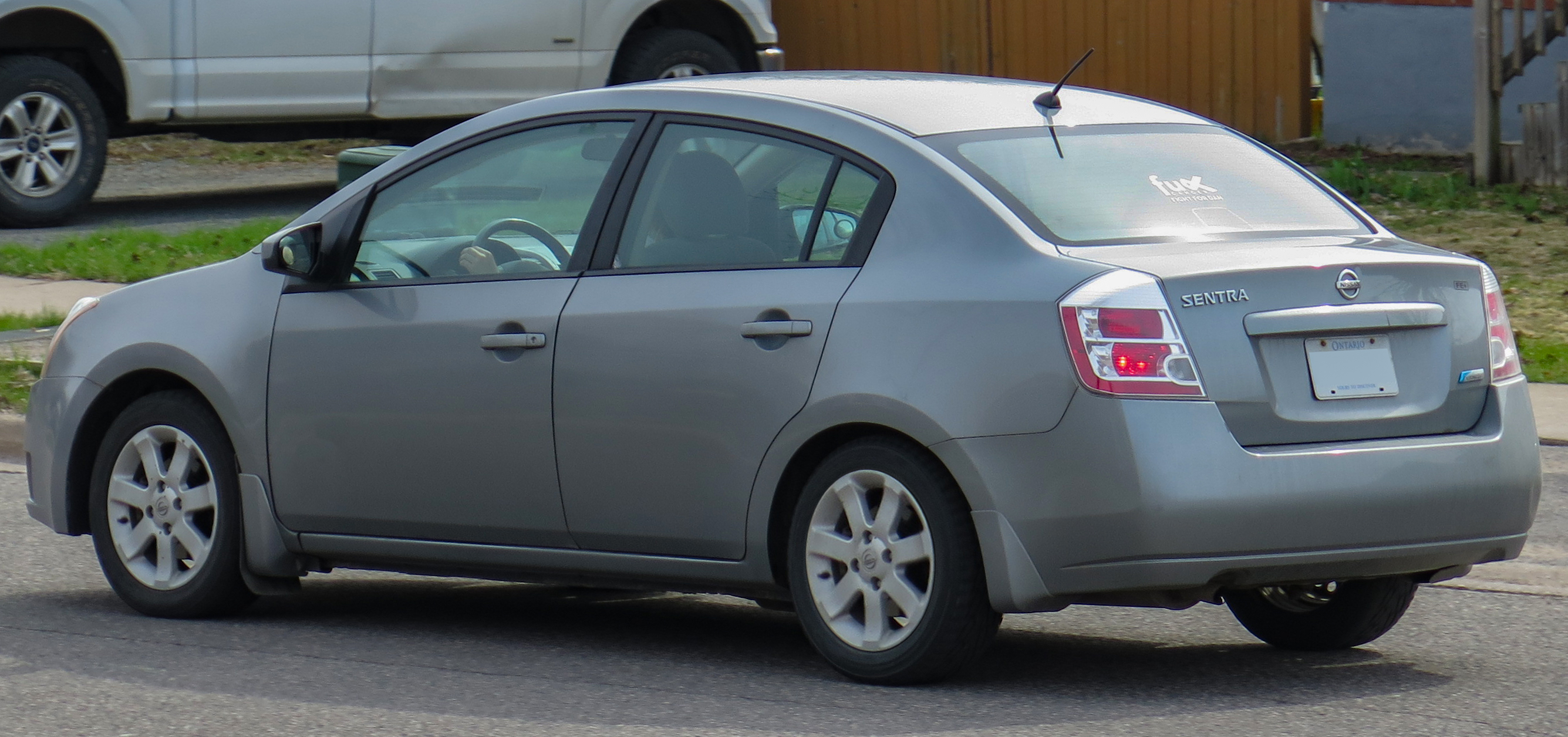
Nissan Sentra (Canada)

Nissan introduced the sixth generation Sentra at the 2006 North American International Auto Show in January. Classified as a mid-size sedan by the EPA thanks to its interior passenger and cargo volume of 110 cubic feet (as the EPA considers "mid" or "intermediate" size a car with interior passenger and cargo volume between 110 and 119 cubic feet), the Sentra is bigger in every dimension than the B15 model, being 65 mm (2.3 in.) longer, 91 mm (3.2 in.) wider, and 113 mm (4.0 in.) taller. The wheelbase is also 167 mm (5.9 in.) longer than the previous model. The sixth generation also marked a change in Nissan's North American lineup, with the Nissan Versa becoming brand's entry-level model. This generation is based on the C platform architecture that also underpins the first-generation Nissan Rogue, Nissan Qashqai and also the T31 Nissan X-Trail, as well as other Renault models. Sentras from this generation were exclusively built in Mexico, with no production in the United States or Japan. The Sentra's standard engine is a 2.0-liter 16-valve inline-four rated at 140 hp (104 kW) and 147 pound-feet (199 N⋅m) of torque. Fuel economy for with the 2.0L mated to the CVT is rated at 26 city/34 hwy, and the 6-speed manual at 24 city/31 hwy. SE-R is rated at 24 city/30 hwy with the CVT being the only transmission available. SE-R Spec-V is rated at 21 city/28 hwy mated with the 6-speed manual.

In 2007 and 2008, Nissan considered marketing a hybrid version of the Sentra, particularly when the price of oil rose to over $100 per barrel. However the price soon retreated below $40, and Nissan decided instead to focus on future hydrogen fuel cell and electric vehicles. Nissan CEO Carlos Ghosn has indicated that he will not attempt to match Toyota and Honda in terms of hybrid models offered for retail sale. This decision has left Nissan without a compact hybrid product to compete with Toyota Prius, the Honda Civic Hybrid, and relaunched Honda Insight. Nissan's only hybrid product on the American market is the Altima Hybrid, which competes with the Toyota Camry Hybrid and the Ford Fusion Hybrid.

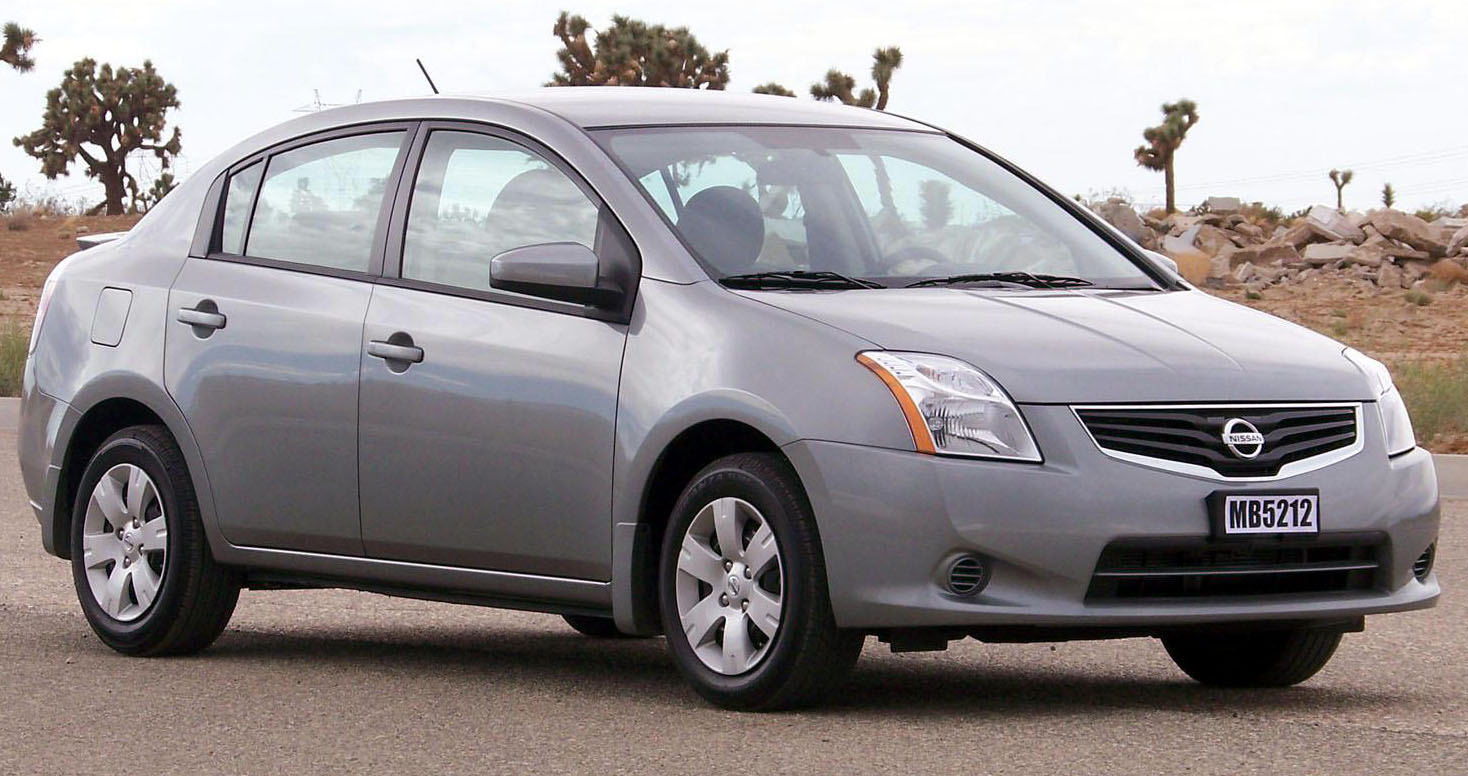
2011 Nissan Sentra 2.0 (US)

For 2010, the Sentra received a mid-cycle refresh. It revisions included a new, Altima-inspired grille, a revised lower fascia and slightly different headlights. In back, new taillights (though almost identical to previous years) and additional chrome trim pieces on the trunk and side moldings highlight the major changes. New trim lines are offered to balance out the prices. Inside is a new red back-lighting color for the speedometer and knobs, and a new CD player with an optional navigation system. The new audio system includes iPod and USB integration on certain models, as well as a backup camera. Fog lamps are no longer standard on the 2.0S and SL model and leather seats are now only available as an option rather than standard on the SL model for 2010, which is reflected in the new, lower MSRP. The Brazilian export variant features a flexible fuel engine and retractable side mirrors were adopted from the Nissan Versa.

The B16 generation was introduced in Argentina in 2010. Until March 2011, the Sentra has sold 948 units in Argentina.

The B16 Sentra was also introduced in the Philippines as the Sentra 200, with the "200" denoting the MR20DE engine. The name is also applied to differentiate itself to the Nissan Sylphy-based Sentra which was locally assembled in the country. All Sentra 200s were imported from Mexico.

=== SE-R/SE-R Spec V (2007–2012) ===
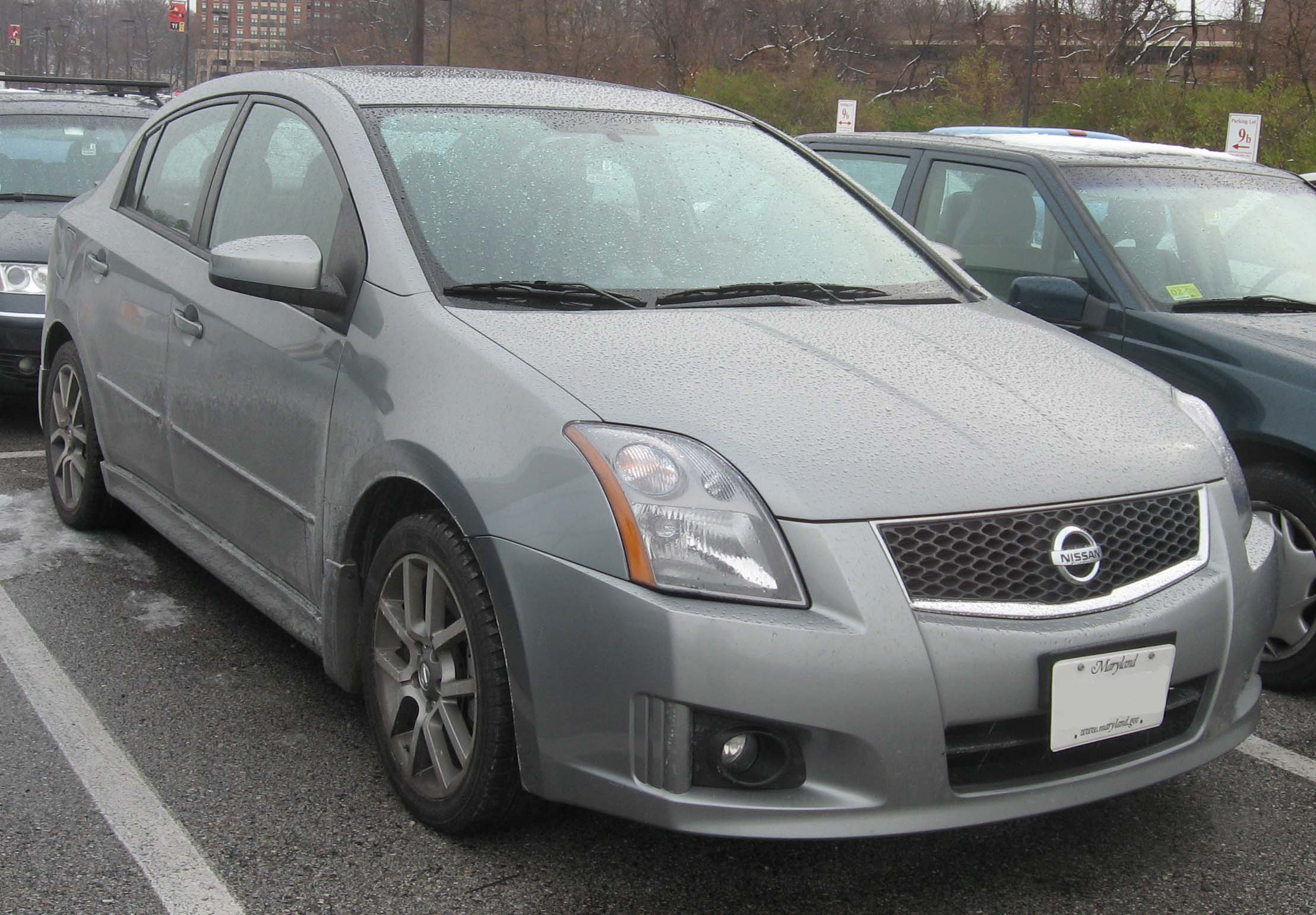
Nissan Sentra SE-R Spec-V

Nissan introduced a new version of the SE-R to the North American market for the 2007 model year. The SE-R is available in two versions: SE-R base and SE-R Spec V. Both get four-wheel disc brakes in place of the standard Sentra's disc/drum setup, unique interior and exterior trim and 17-inch alloy wheels. Both are powered by a redesigned 2.5-liter QR25DE engine. Each model also comes standard with a sport grille, lower body side sill extensions, rear spoiler, fog lights, chrome exhaust-tip finisher, smoked headlight surround and smoked taillights. Unique interior features include black sport seat cloth with red stitching and SE-R embroidered logos, sport metallic-tone accents, aluminium pedal pads, and twin pod meters with oil pressure and G-sensor displays. Also, the 2007–2012 Sentra SER was the only Sentra in the lineup to not change its front bumper design in 2010.

A sunroof package was optional, featuring power sliding glass sunroof with tilt feature, and dual illuminated visor vanity mirrors. An Audio package, featuring a 340-watt Rockford Fosgate 6-CD audio system, with eight speakers (two subwoofers, four mid-range woofers, and two tweeters) was also available.

The SE-R base model is rated at 177 hp (132 kW) at 6000 rpm and 172 lb⋅ft (233 N⋅m) at 2800 rpm and comes exclusively with Nissan's Sport-tuned Xtronic CVT continuously variable transmission and steering wheel-mounted paddle shifters. Suspension upgrades included a front-stabilizer bar (23.0mm) and sport-tuned springs. It featured 11.7" vented front discs and 11.5" rear discs brakes. The SE-R base model started at $19,400 (MSRP).

The SE-R Spec V is rated at 200 hp (149 kW) at 6600 rpm and 180 lb⋅ft (244 N⋅m) at 5200 rpm and comes with a 6-speed manual and optional limited-slip differential. It is capable of 0–60 mph times of 6.7 seconds and a 1/4 mile time of 15.1 seconds at 92.6 mph. On the track, slalom figures resulted in 64.7 mph and .86g at the skidpad. Compression is bumped up to 10.5:1, compared to 9.6:1 in the SE-R base. Front disc brakes are also increased to 12.6". Exclusive suspension upgrades include a sport-tuned suspension with lowered height, sport-tuned shocks and struts, reinforced upper cowl, trunk-mounted V-brace, and a larger front stabilizer bar (25mm). Unique interior features included red front seat belts, leather-wrapped steering wheel with red stitching, and a leather wrapped shift knob. The SE-R Spec V model started at $19,900 (MSRP). 2012 was the final model of the SE-R and Spec V performance variant.

=== SL ===
The sixth generation Sentra also has a better equipped variant known as the SL. These models are generally equipped with a CVT transmission, leather interior, and navigation system.

=== FE+ 2.0 SR (2009) ===
The car was sold for US$17,760, same as the Sentra FE+ 2.0 S model.

=== Flex fuel ===
Nissan launched in August 2009 in Brazil a FFV variant of the B16 Sentra. It features the same MR20DE engine, but capable of running on hydrated ethanol (E100) or a blend of gasoline with 20 to 25 percent of anhydrous ethanol (mandatory blend since 1993) or a mix of both in any proportion.

The engine received a new electronic control unit (ECU) supplied by Bosch and ethanol corrosive-action-resistant internal components. Among these new parts are the intake and exhaust valves and seals made with new materials, the first piston ring made with anodized steel, more resistant connecting rods, fuel injectors suitable for use in ethanol and double-layer exhaust gas oxygen to increase the moisture resistance of the fuel. The power rose to 141 hp (143 cv) both in gasoline and ethanol. Compression ratio of 9.7:1 was kept unchanged.

At the time it was launched, there was some controversy regarding the possibility of vehicles equipped with CVT transmission be converted to flex fuel, since this was the statement that was made by Honda Motor of Brazil in the launch of the second generation Honda Fit in Brazil. During the 2008 upgrade of the Honda Fit, the CVT system was replaced by a conventional automatic transmission and according to the manufacturer it was not possible to attach the CVT transmission infinite relations to a flex fuel engine. Honda's decision to change the type of transmission reduced manufacturing costs and Brazilian auto press inquired the truth of that statement following the release of the CVT-equipped Sentra FFV.

== Seventh generation (B17; 2012) ==
Seventh generation
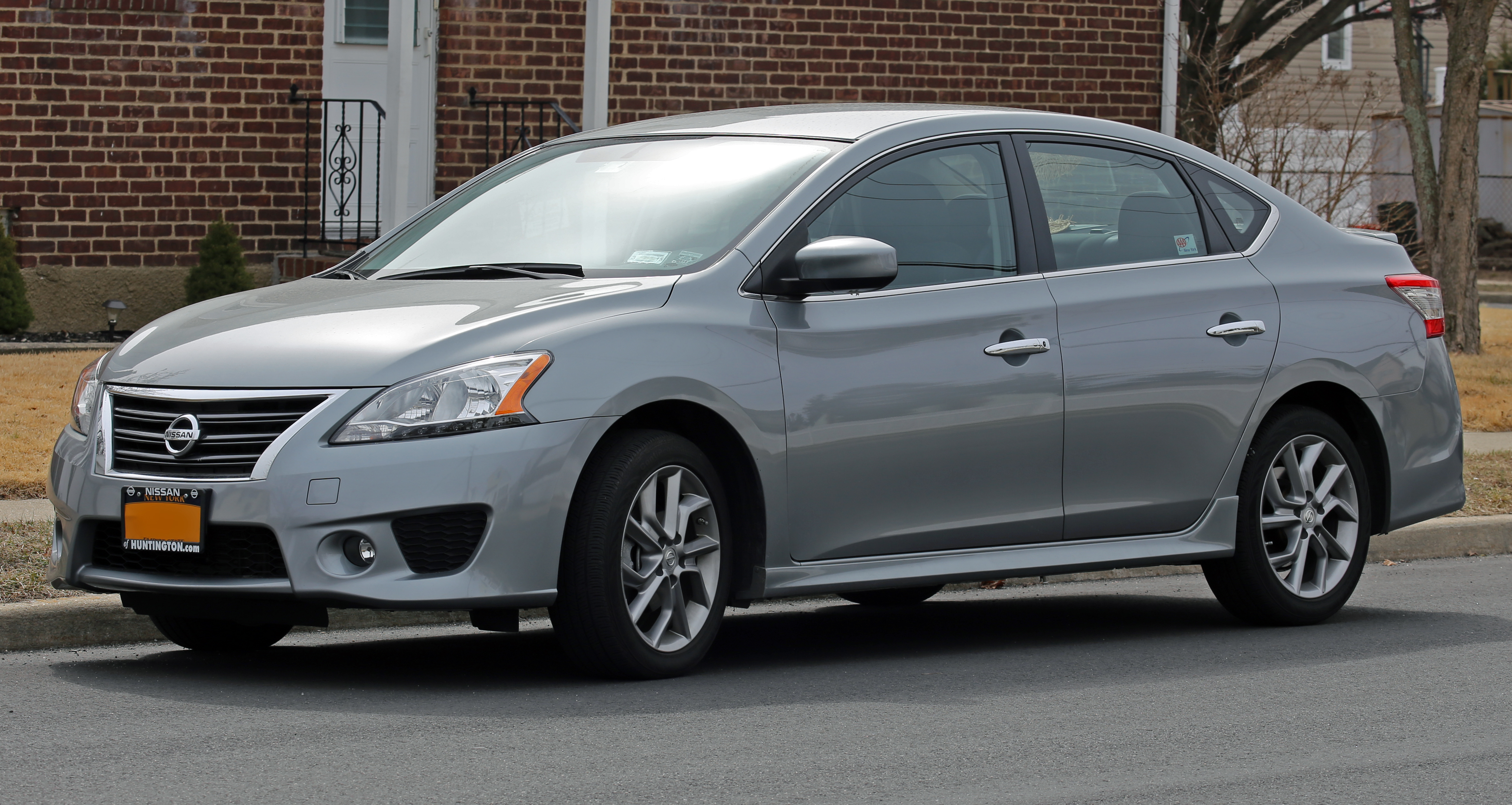
- 2013 Nissan Sentra SR (US)

Overview
- Model code: B17
- Also called: Nissan Sylphy; Nissan Sylphy Classic (China, 2019–present); Nissan Pulsar (Australasia); Dongfeng Ruiying Xuan EV
- Production: 2012–2021 (Japan); 2012–2019 (North America); 2012–present (China); 2013–present (Egypt); 2012–2020 (Thailand); 2014–2016 (Russia)
- Model years: 2013–2019 (North America)
- Assembly: Japan: Yokosuka, Kanagawa (Oppama Plant); United States: Canton, Mississippi (2012–2014); Mexico: Aguascalientes; China: Guangzhou (Dongfeng Nissan); Taiwan: Miaoli; Thailand: Samut Prakan; Malaysia: Serendah (TCMA); Russia: Izhevsk (IzhAvto); Egypt: 6th of October
- Designer: Kinichi Saito

Body and chassis
- Body style: 4-door sedan
- Layout: Front-engine, front-wheel-drive
- Platform: Nissan V platform
- Related: Nissan Tiida (C12); Venucia D60

Powertrain
- Engine: Gasoline: 1.6 L HR16DE I4; 1.6 L MR16DDT turbo I4; 1.8 L MRA8DE I4; 2.0 L MR20DE I4 (gasoline/ethanol; Brazil); Diesel: 1.5 L Renault K9K764 I4
- Transmission: 5-speed manual 6-speed manual 5-speed automatic 6-speed automatic CVT

Dimensions
- Wheelbase: 106.3 in (2,700 mm)
- Length: 181.7–182.1 in (4,615–4,625 mm)
- Width: 69.3 in (1,760 mm)
- Height: 58.9 in (1,495 mm)
- Curb weight: 2,619–2,767 lb (1,188–1,255 kg)

The 2013 Nissan Sentra was revealed at the 2012 Beijing Auto Show as the Nissan Sylphy, as both the Sylphy and Sentra model development were merged into a single global model for efficiency. The design of the car is based on aerodynamic and premium design with LED-bordered headlamps, LED tail lamps, sharp angled trunk lid and chrome trim and featuring large interior space and class leading trunk. It also features an intelligent key with push start button and a dual-zone climate control in certain markets. This model was envisioned to debut in over 120 countries around the world by 2014.

=== Markets ===
==== North America ====
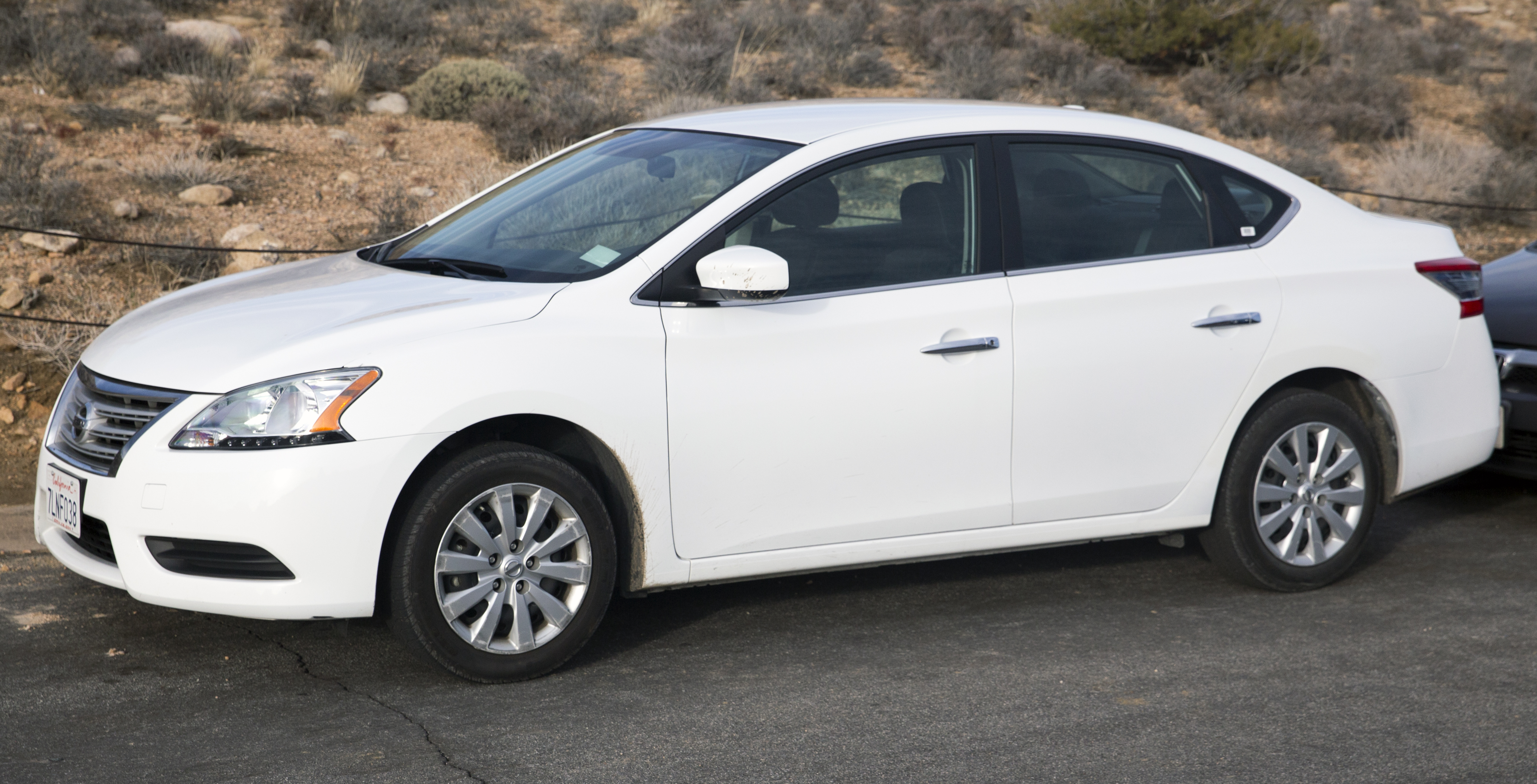

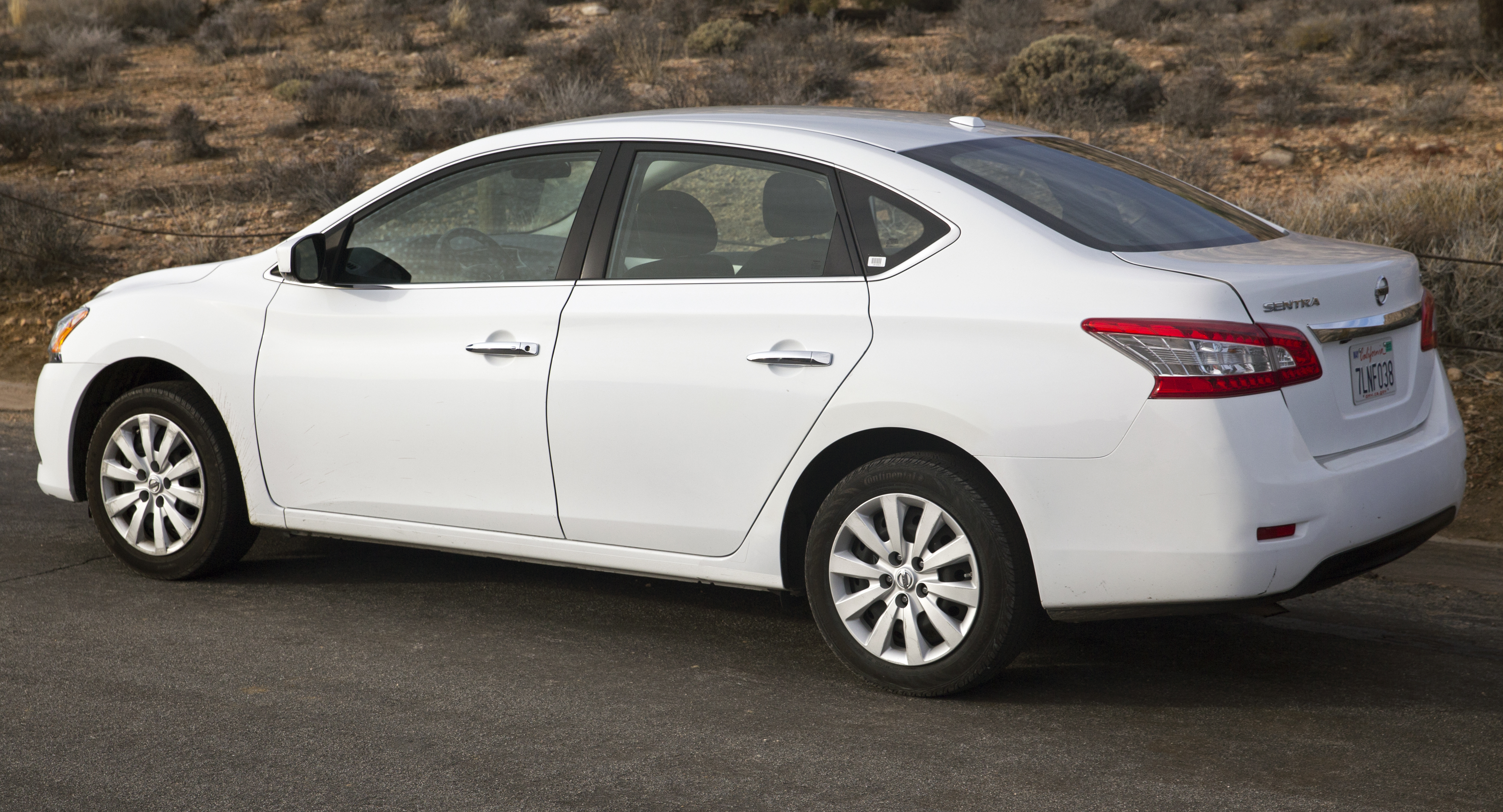
2015 Nissan Sentra S (US)

Nissan unveiled the seventh generation Sentra in North America in August 2012 for the 2013 model year. It is the third region to get the B17 Sylphy model after China and Thailand. The new Sentra is completely redesigned inside and out, with styling upscaled to look more similar to Nissan's other sedans, the Altima and Maxima including LED taillights, LED accents in the headlights, and a new navigation and electronics system.

It is longer than the previous generation Sentra by 2.3in, with a 0.6in longer wheelbase, but 150 lb lighter than its predecessor. The new MRA8DE 1.8-liter 16-valve DOHC inline-four is offered for better fuel economy than the previous model, ratings are 30 city/39 highway. The engine output returns 130 hp (97 kW) and 128 lb⋅ft (174 N⋅m) of torque. It is also offered with a 1.6-liter turbo engine borrowed from the Juke making 188 hp (140 kW) and mated with 6-speed manual or CVT transmission, and return combined 34mpg EPA fuel economy (30 city/39 highway). The FE+ version available in S and SL models can returns 40mpg highway.

Similar to the outgoing model, the new Sentra is offered in S, FE S, SV, FE+ SV, SR, and SL trim levels. All trims will be equipped with a reworked CVT except the base S model, which has an optional six-speed manual transmission. There is no SE-R or SE-R Spec V version of this model. The SR is the sporting model, come with rear spoiler, 17" alloy wheels and silver trim. Satellite navigation, intelligent key with start button, and dual-zone climate control are available in high spec models.

In Canada, the only trim levels are S and SV; SL and SR models are options for SV models. Air conditioning is an option in both S and SV models.

The Sentra is built at Nissan's Canton, Mississippi plant since December 2012. However, early units were built in Mexico.

===== 2014 =====
Enhancements for 2014 (going on sale in November 2013) included:

- Revised CVT transmission tuning
- Revised steering and suspension tuning
- Sliding front armrest now standard on SL grade and added to SV/SR Driver Package
- New front seat lower cushion storage pockets standard on all models
- Updated NissanConnect with Navigation with all-new NissanConnect Apps smartphone integration for iPhone and Android, improved voice recognition and one-shot destination entry
- Auto Hazard Warning Signal added
- Offered in seven models, each equipped with a standard 1.8-liter DOHC four-cylinder engine and next-generation Xtronic CVT (except S 6MT): S 6MT, S CVT, FE+ S, SV, FE+ SV, SR and SL

===== 2015 =====
- New exterior color choices.
- Rear disc brakes, side view mirrors with turn signal indicator lights & push button start with i-Key now standard on SR models.

===== 2016 facelift =====
For the 2016 model year, the Sentra received a facelift including new front and rear bumpers, lights, hood, trunk and wheels to closer resemble the Maxima and Altima. The 2016 Nissan Sentra is offered in five models: S, FE S, SV, SR and SL, with only the S available with manual transmission (with optional CVT). Key features of the 2016 Sentra exterior include a new front fascia, grille, fenders, hood and signature boomerang-shaped headlights. On the Sentra SR and SL, new LED low-beam headlights with LED DRLs are offered. There are also two new 17-inch wheel designs for SR and SL grades, as well as a new SV 16-inch aluminum-alloy wheel design. New for 2016 is one exterior color, Blue Pearl.

There is a new steering wheel, available six-way power driver's seat with power lumbar (standard on Sentra SL and optional on Sentra SR), a new center cluster design, a new console and shifter knob, and improved seat fabrics. It also has NissanConnect which is standard on SV and SR grades.

===== 2017 =====
For the 2017 model year, the Sentra received two new trim levels called SR Turbo and NISMO. They feature the 188 hp (140 kW) MR16DDT. They were the first turbocharged Sentras ever offered by Nissan in the North American market. Both trims were offered with a 6-speed manual transmission or with a CVT, however only the NISMO continued to offer the manual transmission after 2017. The NISMO model gets a lowered performance-tuned suspension, racing seats, LED tail lights, red interior trim as well as a NISMO specific body kit with bumper equipped LED DRLs and NISMO wheels.

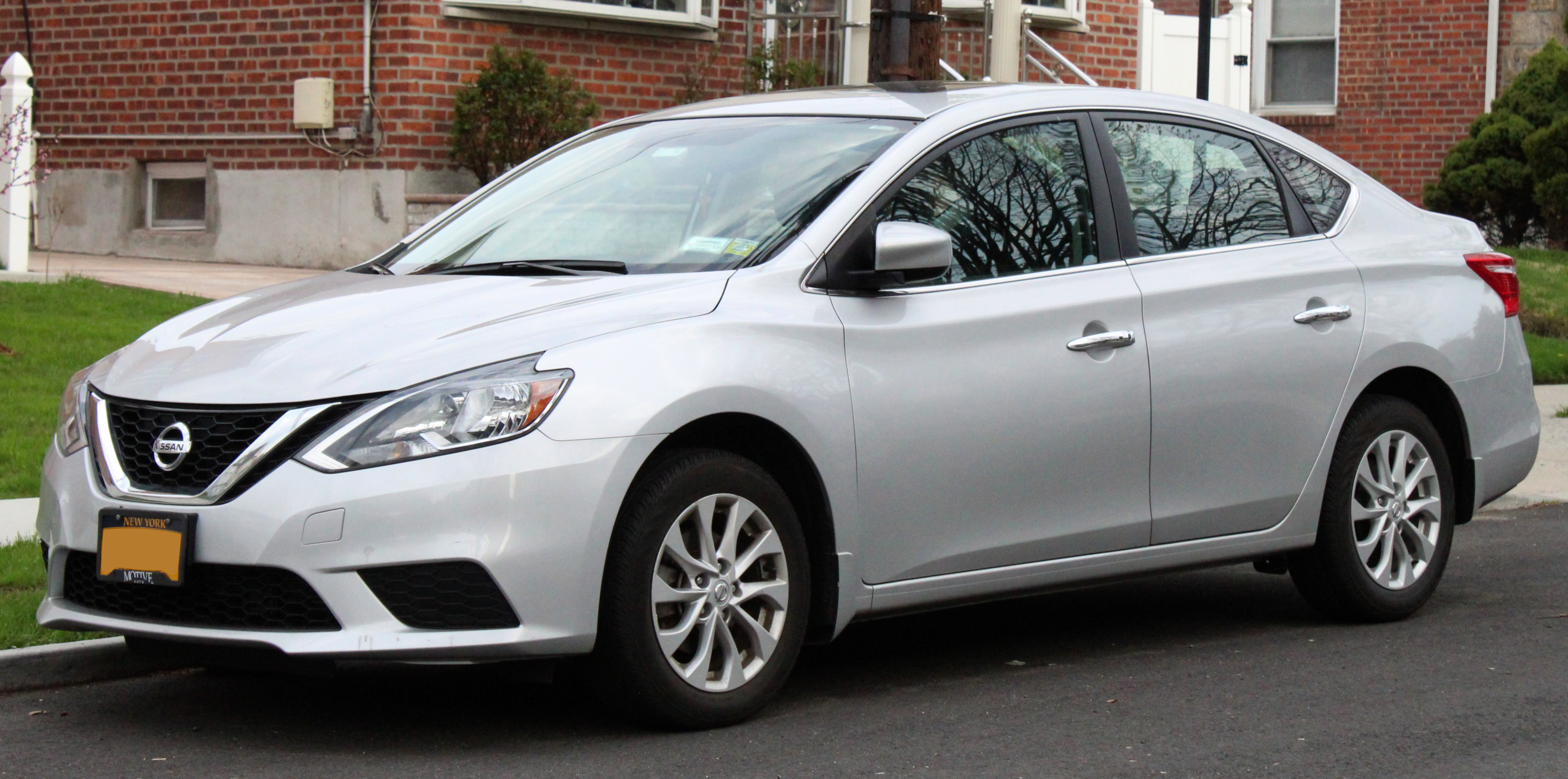
2017 Nissan Sentra SV (US; 2016 facelift)

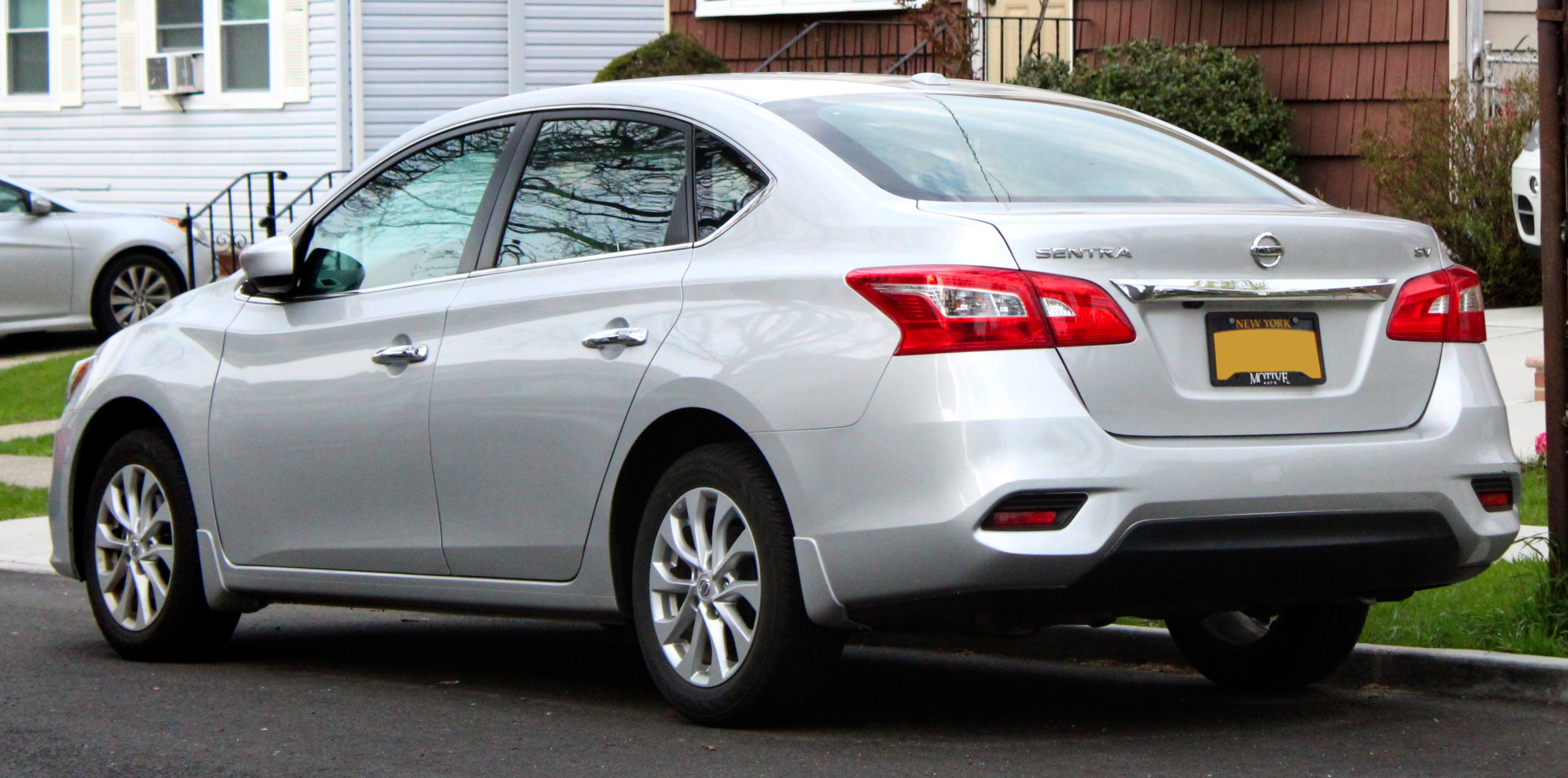
Rear view

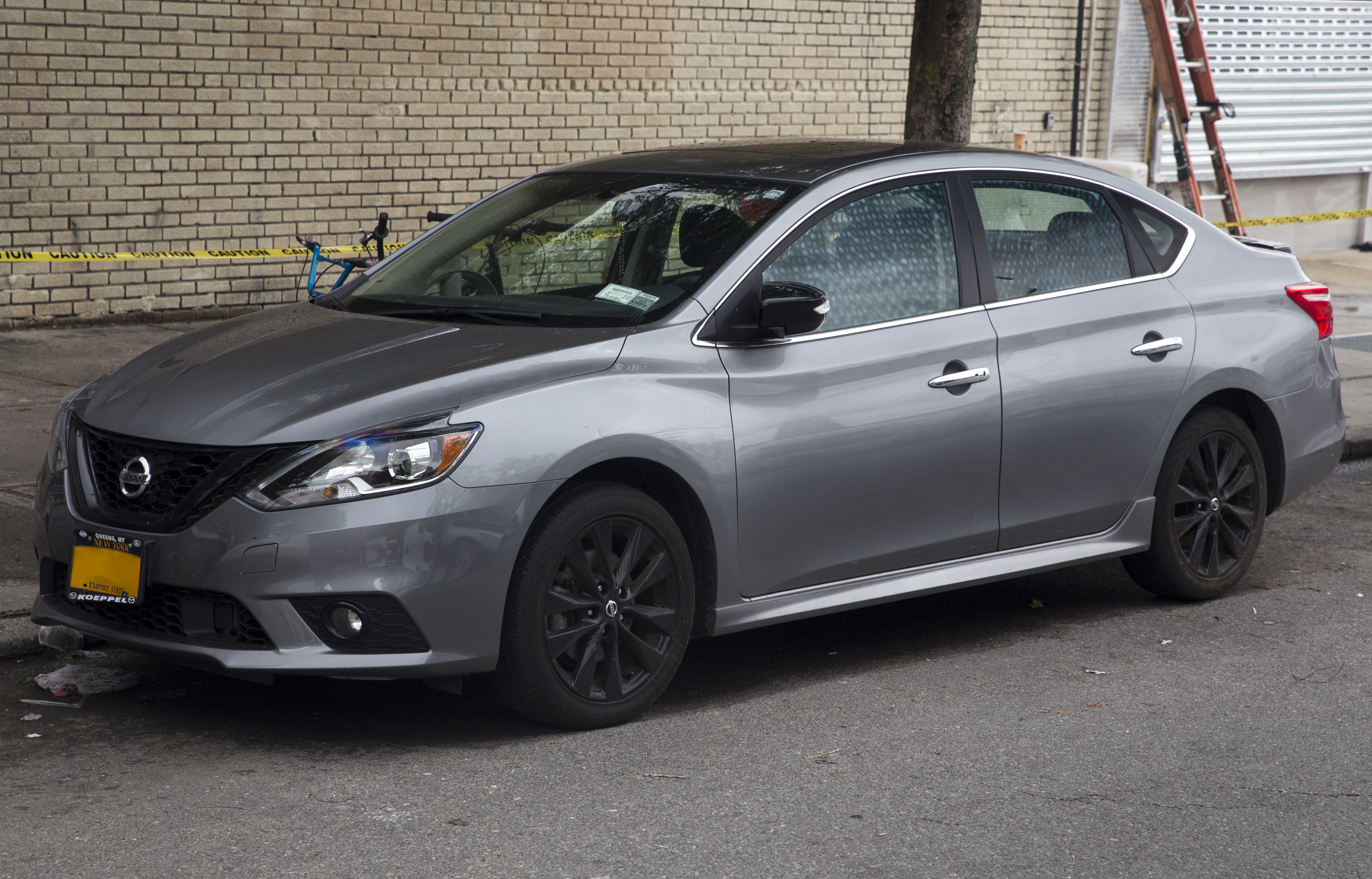
2018 Nissan Sentra SR Turbo

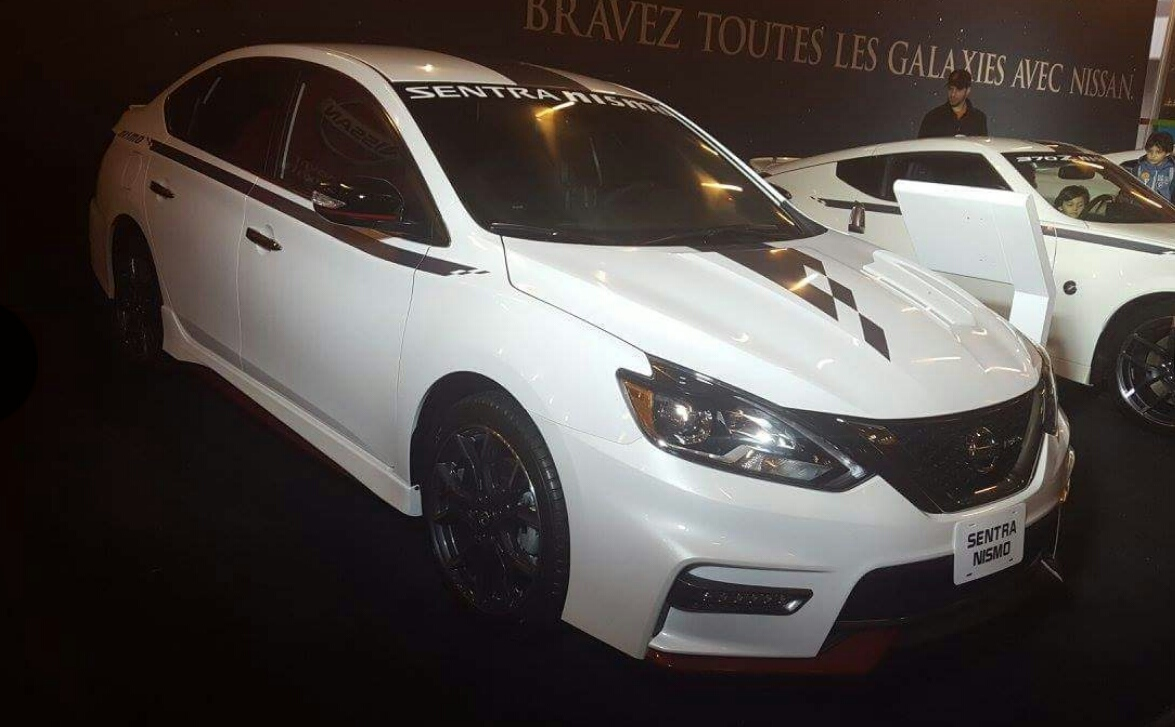
2017 Nissan Sentra Nismo (Canada)

==== Japan ====
In Japan, Nissan Sylphy debuted on 5 December 2012, and built at the Oppama plant in Yokosuka City, Kanagawa Prefecture. The "Bluebird" nameplate was dropped from "Bluebird Sylphy".

==== South Africa ====
In South Africa, the B17 is called Nissan Sentra and comes in Acenta trim only, with 1.6-liter engine and five-speed manual or CVT automatic.

==== Asia ====
In China, the Sylphy is available with HR16DE 1.6-liter (93 kW/154Nm) or MRA8DE 1.8-liter engine (102 kW/174Nm) with a five-speed (six-speed in the 1.8) manual or CVT transmission. In 2018, an electric version called the Sylphy Z.E. was available for the Chinese market, featuring a slightly revised front and rear end design. It was renamed as Sylphy Classic (officially marketed as 轩逸•经典) in 2019 to avoid confusion with the eighth generation model. A rebadged electric version called the Dongfeng Ruiying Xuan EV (睿英·轩EV) was launched in 2021, featuring the exact same design as the Sylphy Z.E. sold in China while is capable of performing battery swaps. The Dongfeng Ruiying Xuan EV is powered by an electric motor developing 109hp (80kW) and 254 N·m torque.

In Thailand, the second country to get the Sylphy, the car uses same engines as Chinese market version but the power is reduced (1.6 down from 93 kW to 85 kW and 1.8 down from 102 kW to 96 kW; torque remains unchanged). The sales target was 20,000 units per year. Nissan also confirmed that they would be exporting Sylphys to the Australian and Middle Eastern markets in December 2012 or January 2013.

On 15 October 2015, Nissan Thailand introduced the MR16DDT engine into the Sylphy lineup during a mid-model refresh. Producing 140 kW/240 N⋅m, the MR16DDT is a direct injection, turbo gasoline engine able to run on 95 or 91 RON, E10. Cruise control and NissanConnect were added to the trim options.

In the Philippines, The Nissan Sylphy unveiled on 7 March 2014, shortly after the Nissan press event, alongside the Nissan Altima mid-size sedan. The Sylphy, replacing both B16 Sentra 200 and the N16 Sentra, comes in white, black, gray, silver, and bronze. It is imported from Thailand. It is available in 1.6 and 1.8 liter variants, paired with 5-speed manual for the former and CVT for all variants.

The B17 Nissan Sylphy was launched in Singapore in March 2013 where two variants were offered: 1.6 and 1.8; in base trim, Premium and Premium Signature Series. In late 2017, the Sylphy was updated with changes including a new grille and front bumper, gloss black plastic for interior trim and new rim spoke design. The facelifted Sylphy was launched on 10 January 2019 at the Singapore Motorshow with restyled headlamps similar to the Taiwanese Sentra.

On 29 April 2014, the Sylphy has made its debut in Malaysia. Safety features such as 6 SRS airbags, VDC, TCS, ABS, EBD and BA were standard. The units were imported from Thailand. In August 2014, 'Impul' accessories became available and consisted of a bodykit, lowered suspension, wheels and tyres. The Sylphy has since been discontinued in Malaysia as evidence from the absence of the Sylphy from official price lists and absence from Nissan's Malaysia official site.

In the Middle East, the Sentra is available with 1.6- and 1.8-liter engines.

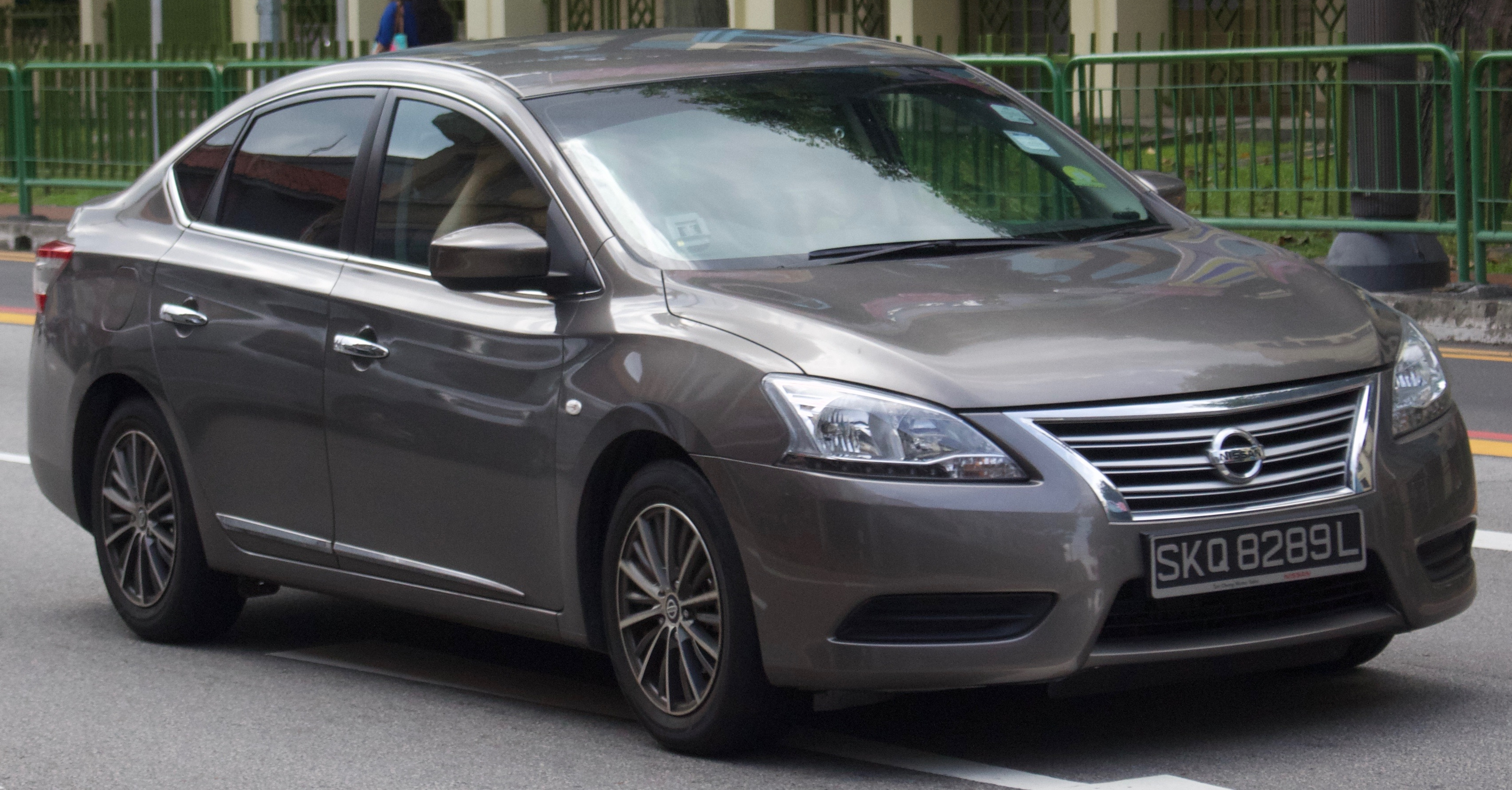
Nissan Sylphy 1.8 Premium (Singapore; pre-facelift)

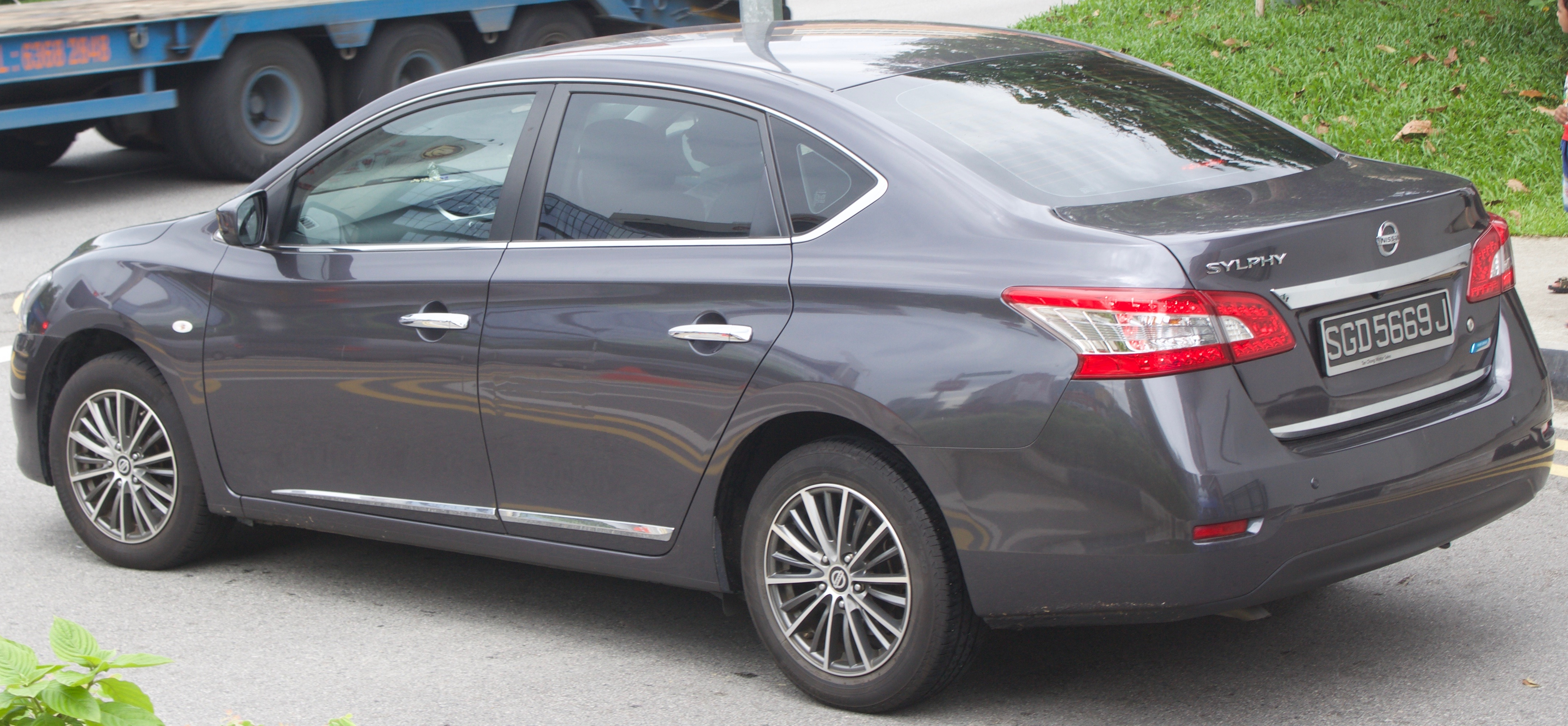
Nissan Sylphy 1.8 Premium (Singapore; pre-facelift)

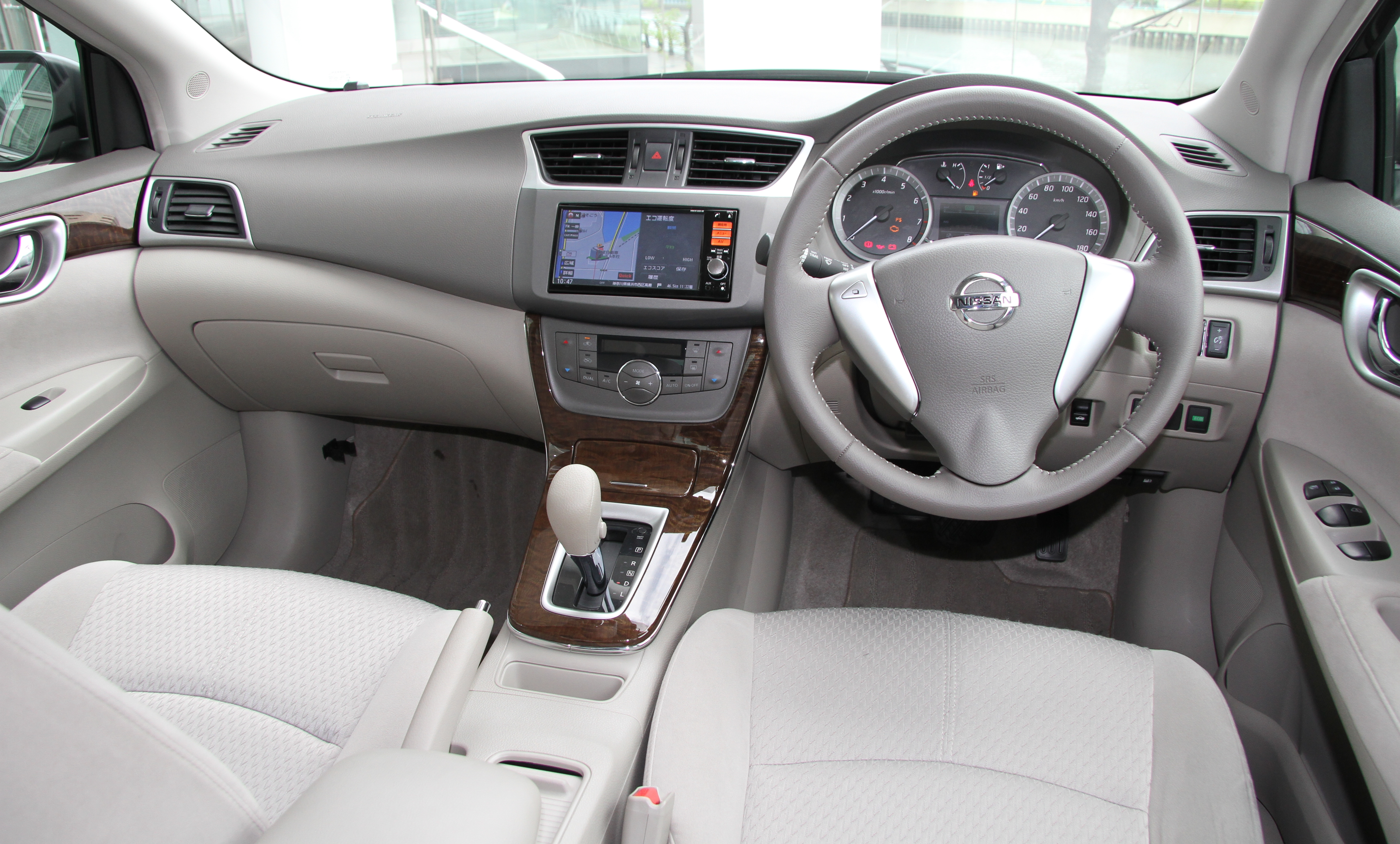
Interior

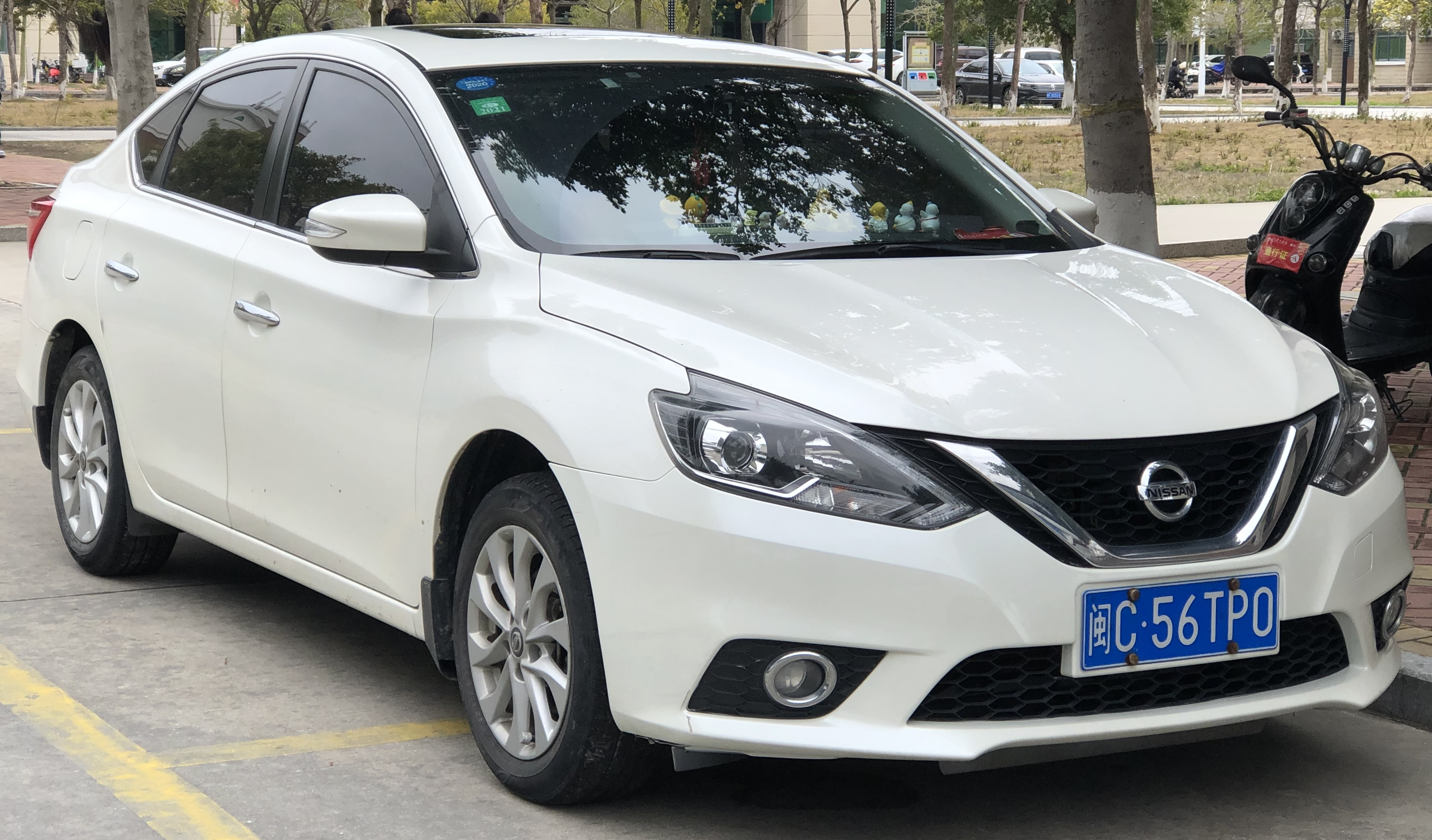
Facelift (China)

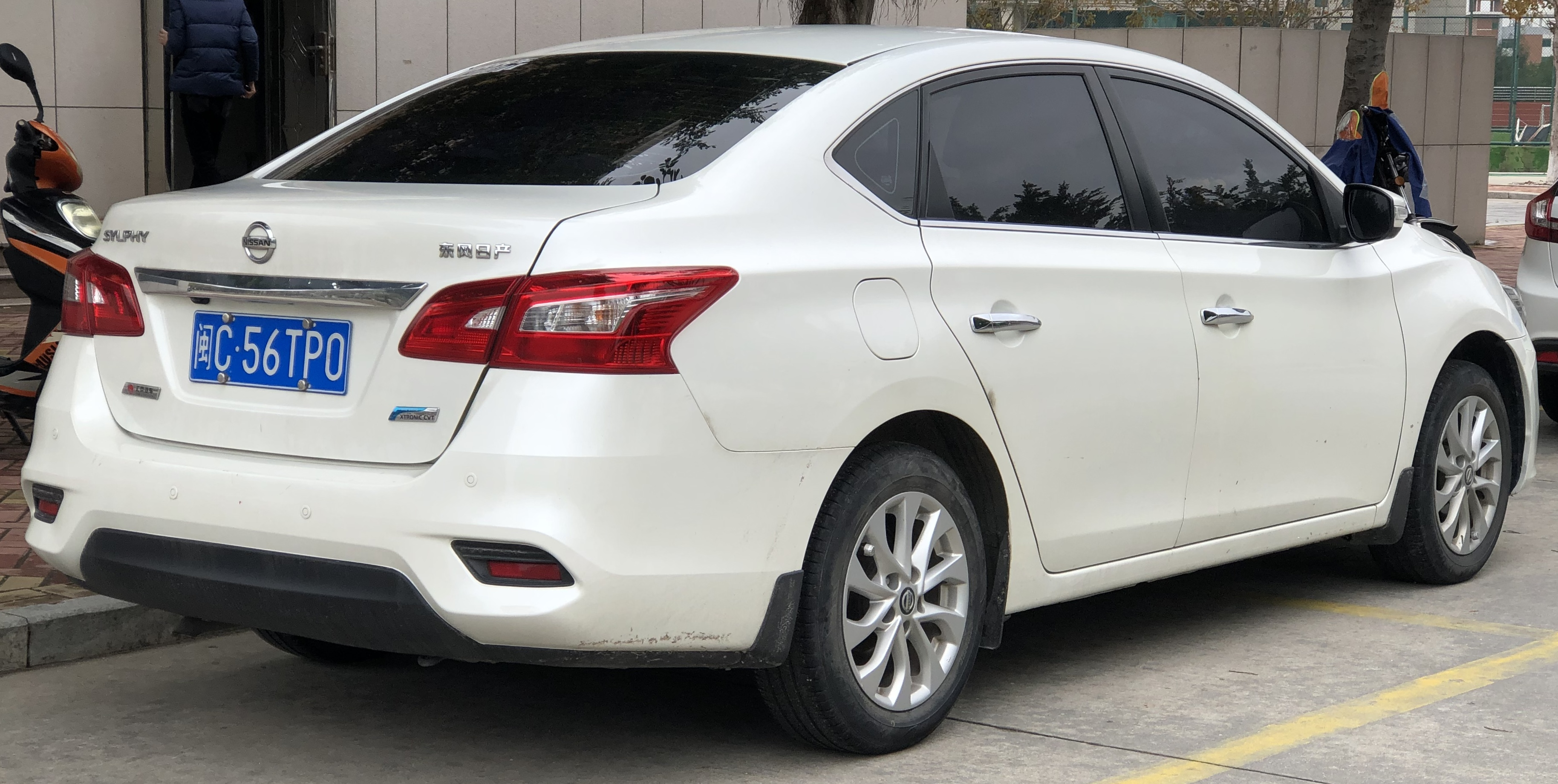
Facelift (China)

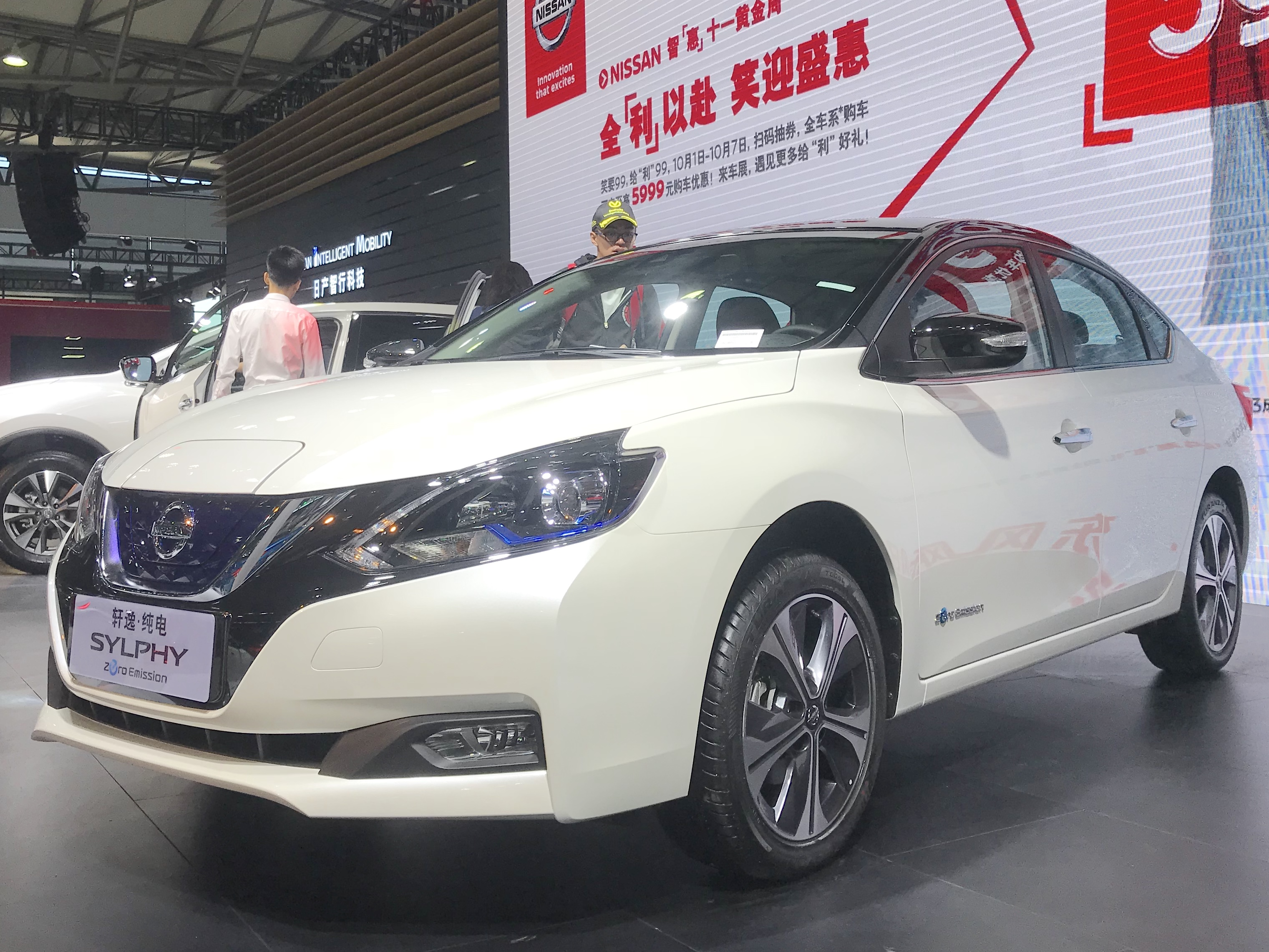
Nissan Sylphy Z.E. (second facelift)

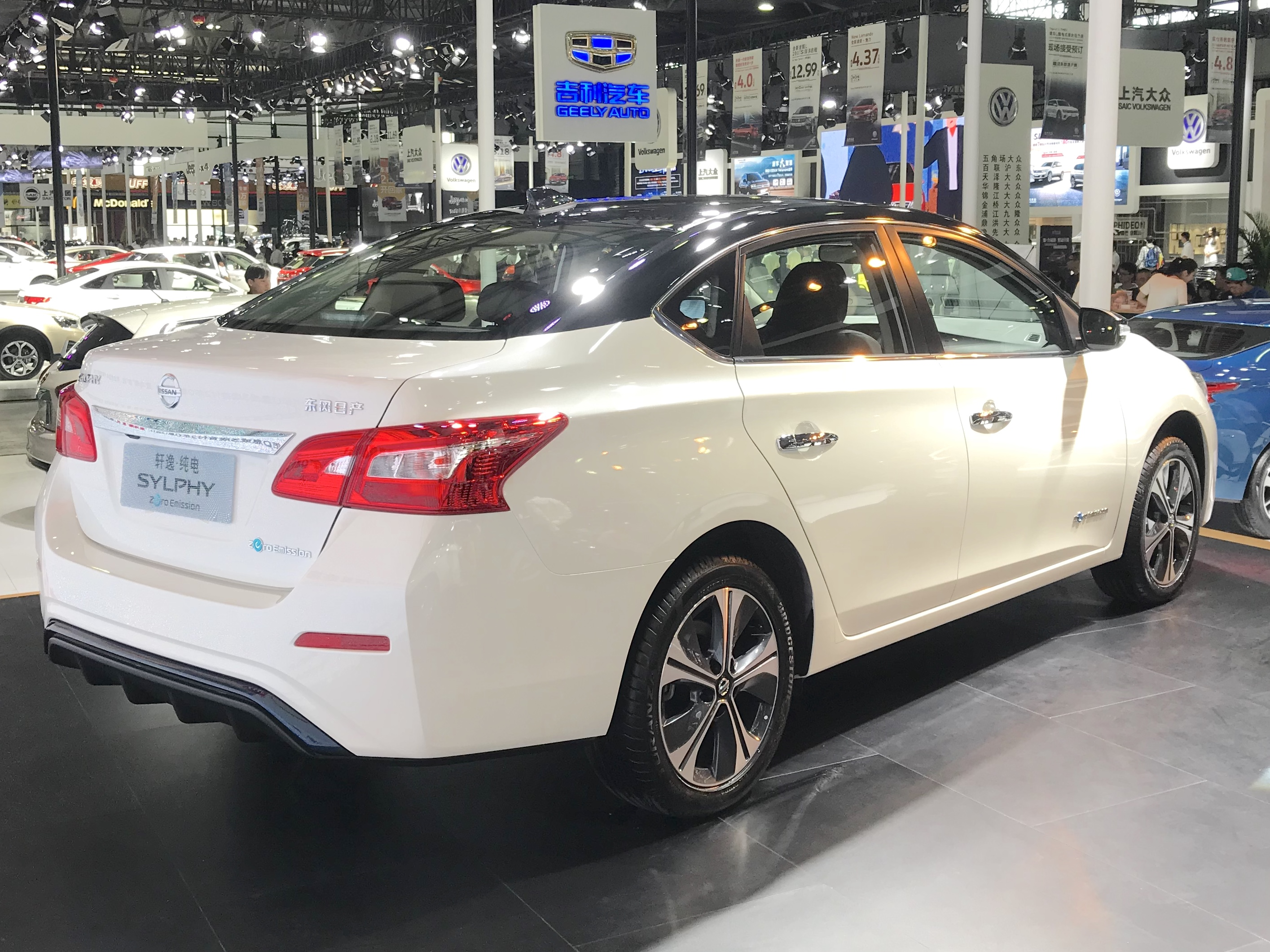
Nissan Sylphy Z.E. (second facelift)

==== Australia ====
The Nissan Pulsar nameplate returned to the Australian and New Zealand markets on 28 February 2013. The new model was a re-badged Nissan Sentra. Announced at the Australian International Motor Show in Sydney in October 2012 and available in three trim levels: ST, ST-L, and Ti. Manual and CVT automatic transmissions are available (manual available in ST and ST-L models only). All models feature six airbags, alloy wheels, Bluetooth and cruise control; the ST-L gets added leather gear shift and steering wheel, fog lamps, and a rear spoiler while the Ti adds Xenon headlamps, leather seats, dual-zone climate control, satellite navigation, and rear view camera. Sales started in February 2013.

A five-door Pulsar hatchback was added later in 2013, but this is based on the C12 Nissan Tiida.

Sales for the Pulsar in Australia ended in 2017 due to competition with the Toyota Corolla and Mazda3 at the time as well as the rise in SUV sales.

==== Latin America ====
In Brazil, the B17 is called the Nissan Sentra and comes with the 2.0-liter MR20DE flex-fuel engine, the same used in the previous Sentra model due to market demands (all direct competitors use a 2.0 engine). The model exported and sold in Brazil is built in Aguascalientes, Mexico.

==== Russia ====
Nissan Sentra debuted in Russian market in 2014. The car is powered with 1.6 engine (117 hp) fitted with 5-speed manual or CVT. Sentra for Russian market is locally built in Izhevsk.

=== 2018 Taiwanese Sentra facelift ===
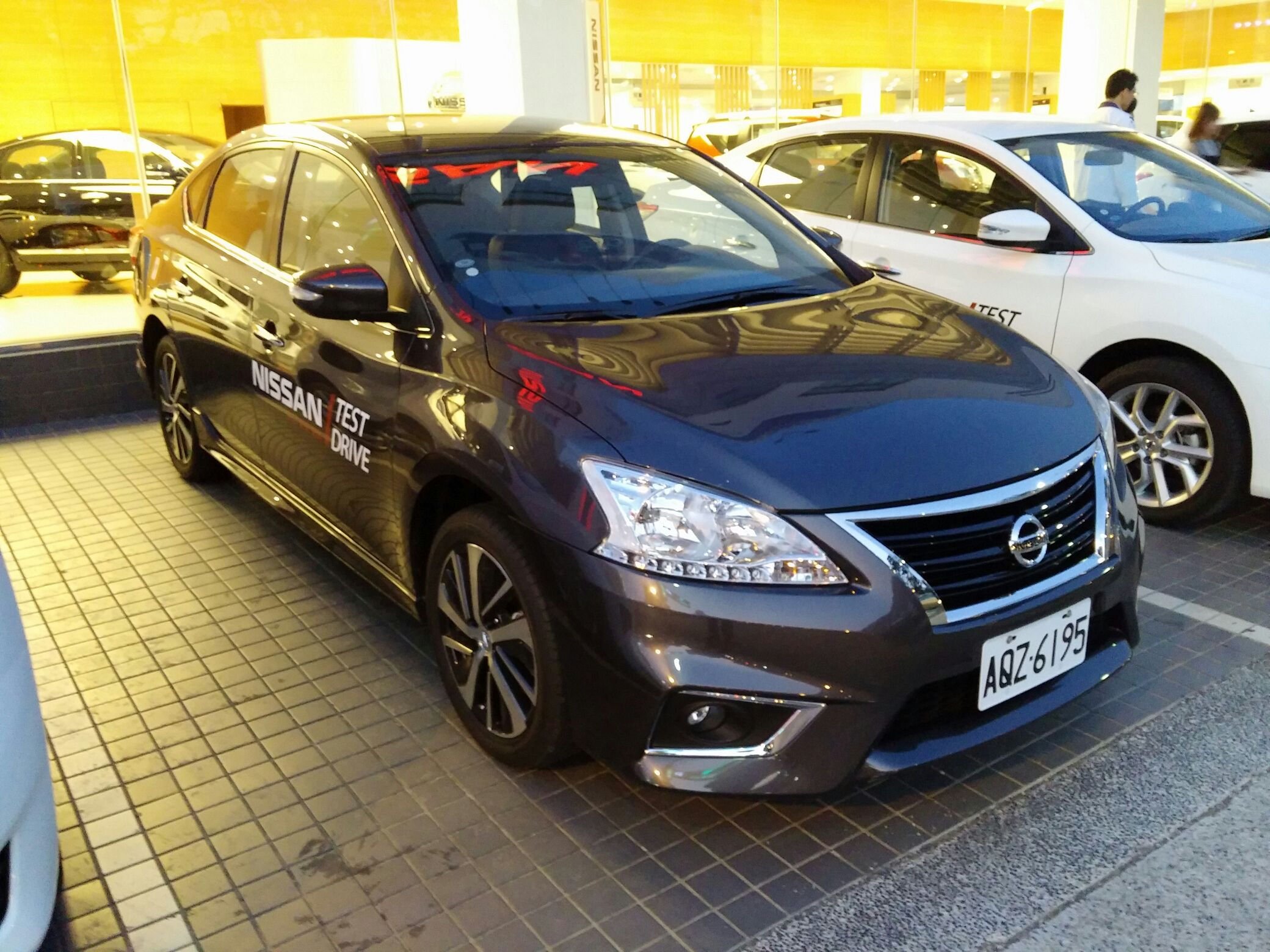
Nissan Sentra Aero (B17) in Taiwan (2014)

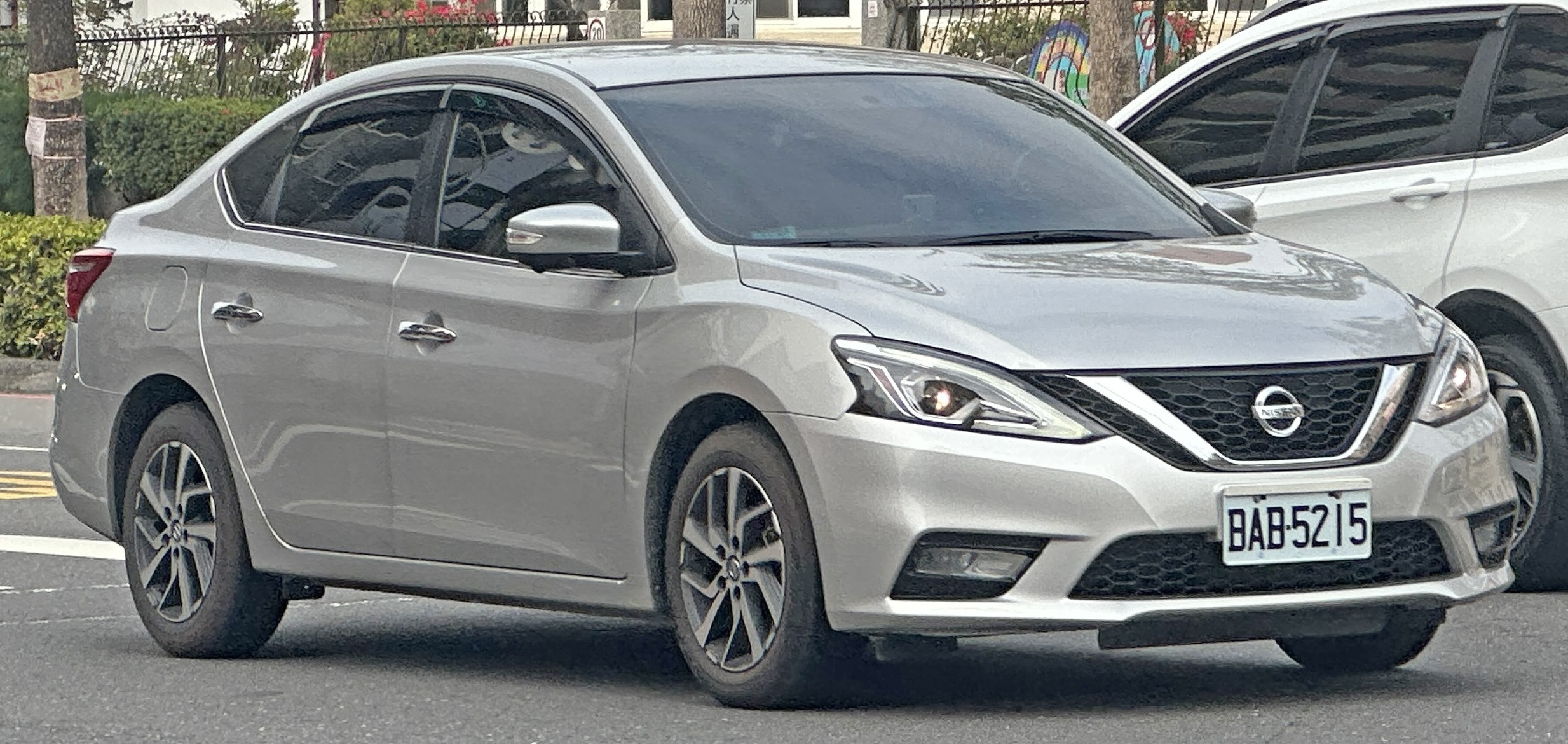
Nissan Sentra B17 Taiwanese market facelift (2018) by Yulon

In the Taiwanese market, the B17 Nissan Sentra has not been facelifted apart from receiving a sportier variant called the Sentra Aero in 2014. The B17 Sentra was finally updated with the V motion front fascia in November 2017 for the 2018 model year, but the facelift was a version exclusive to the Taiwanese market conducted by Yulon Motors, the manufacturer of Nissan products in Taiwan. The facelift preserves the pre-facelift front fenders and hood with only the headlights and front bumper redesigned to save cost. The rest of the vehicle is inline with the international 2016 facelift versions, including new wheels, taillights and rear bumpers.

=== Safety ===
ANCAP test results* Nissan Pulsar all 1.8L hatch variants (2013)
Test	Score
Overall	5 /5 stars
Frontal offset	12.93/16
Side impact	15.74/16
Pole	2/2
Seat belt reminders	2/3
Whiplash protection	Adequate
Pedestrian protection	Adequate
Electronic stability control	Standard

ANCAP test results* Nissan Pulsar all 1.8L sedan variants (2013)
Test	Score
Overall	5 /5 stars
Frontal offset	12.93/16
Side impact	15.74/16
Pole	2/2
Seat belt reminders	2/3
Whiplash protection	Adequate
Pedestrian protection	Adequate
Electronic stability control	Standard

== Eighth generation (B18; 2019) ==
Eighth generation
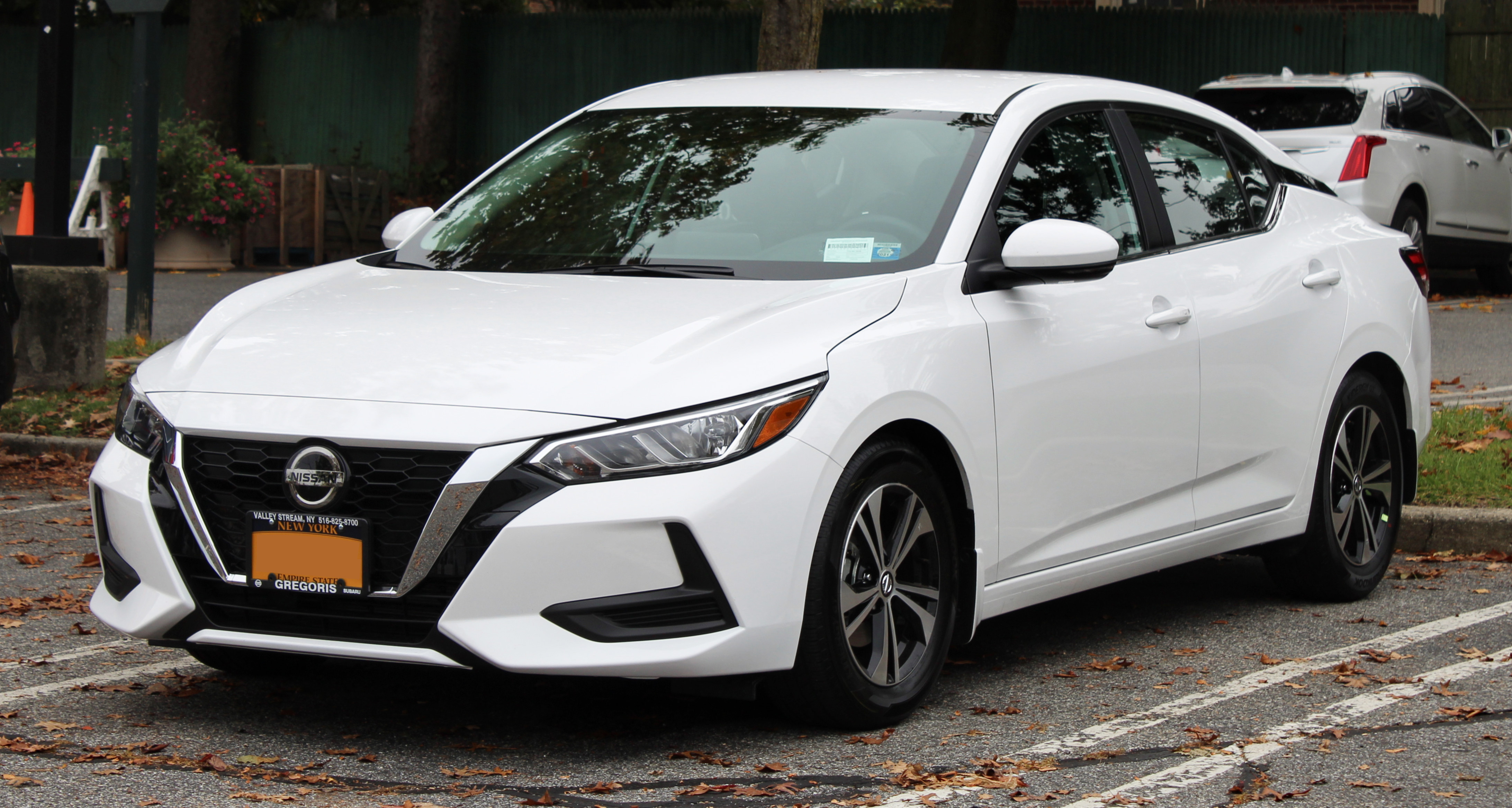
- 2020 Nissan Sentra SV (US)

Overview
- Model code: B18
- Also called: Nissan Sylphy
- Production: 2019–2025 (North America); 2019–present (China); 2020–present (Taiwan)
- Model years: 2020–2025 (North America)
- Assembly: China: Guangzhou (DMCL); Mexico: Aguascalientes (Nissan Mexicana, A2); Taiwan: Miaoli
- Designer: Takashi Utsunomiya, Tsuyoshi Kawashima and Marcus Quach

Body and chassis
- Body style: 4-door sedan
- Layout: Front-engine, front-wheel-drive
- Platform: Renault–Nissan CMF-CD platform

Powertrain
- Engine: Gasoline: 1.6 L HR16DE I4; 2.0 L MR20DD I4; Gasoline hybrid: 1.2 L HR12DE e-Power I3 (China)
- Electric motor: AC3 synchronous (e-Power)
- Transmission: 6-speed manual CVT; Single speed constant ratio (e-Power)
- Hybrid drivetrain: Series hybrid (e-Power)
- Battery: 2 kWh Panasonic lithium-ion (e-Power)

Dimensions
- Wheelbase: 106.8 in (2,712 mm)
- Length: 182.7 in (4,641 mm)
- Width: 71.5 in (1,815 mm)
- Height: 57.1 in (1,450 mm)

The fourth generation Sylphy was unveiled on 16 April 2019 at the 18th Shanghai International Automobile Industry Exhibition. The Sentra-badged version was unveiled at the 2019 Los Angeles Auto Show.

The 2.0-liter MR20DD replaces the 1.8-liter MRA8DE engine from the previous generation. A manual transmission option is not offered in the United States, but a manual version is sold in Canada. The 1.6-liter HR16DE is still available in some Asian markets. For the Sentra marketed in the Americas, an independent rear suspension replaces the torsion beam rear suspension found in the past three generation Sentras.

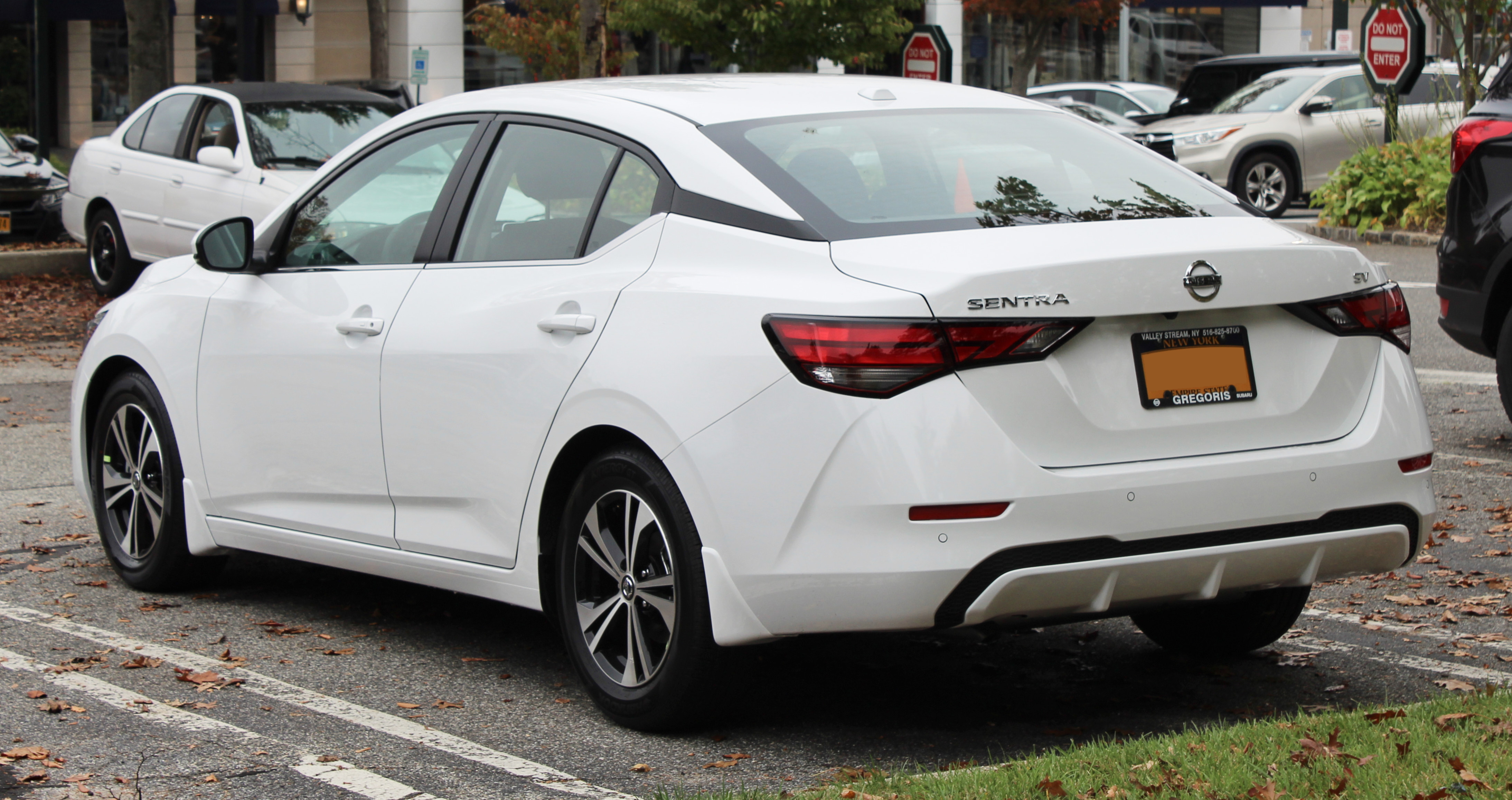
Rear view

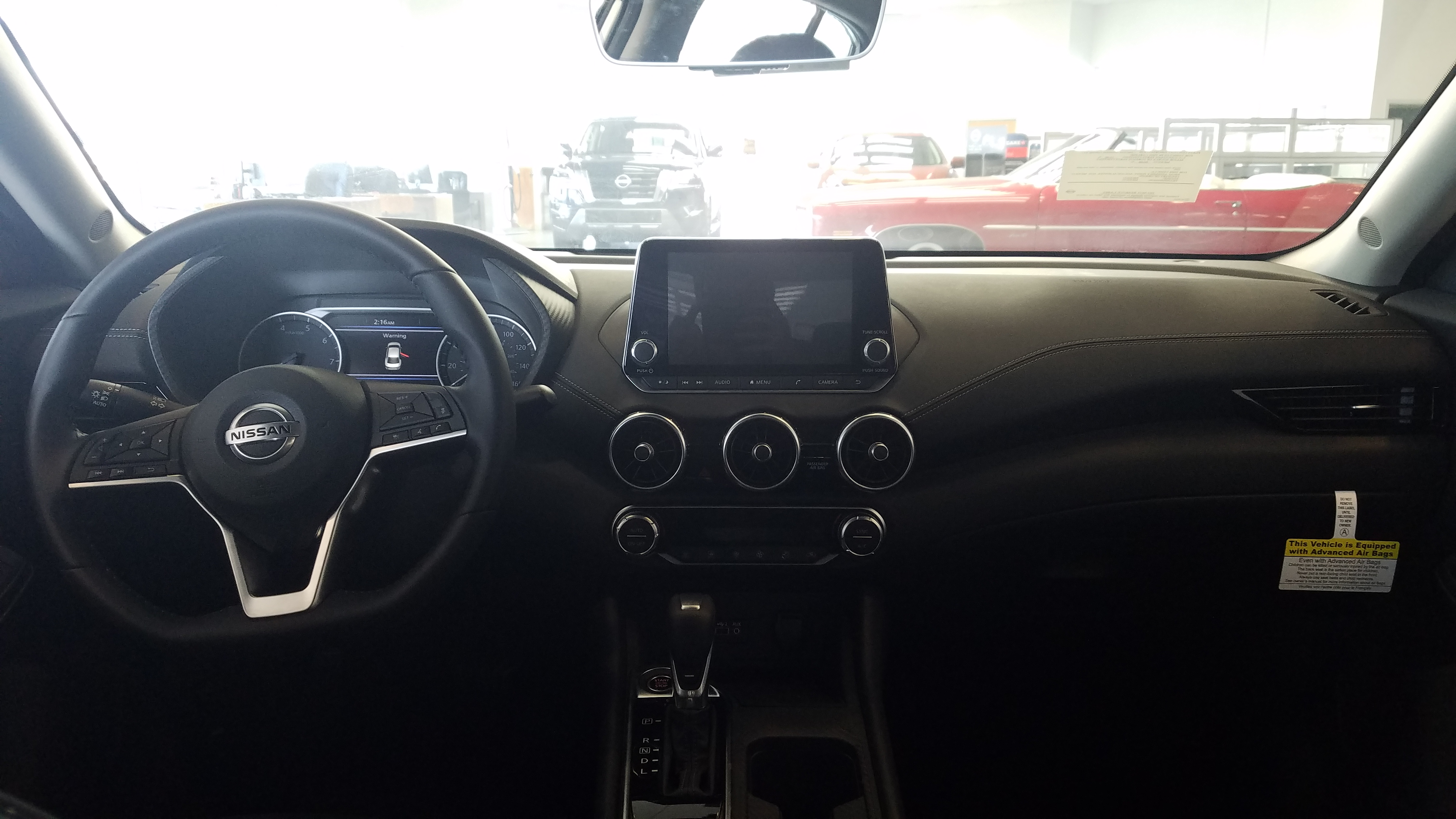
Interior

=== Markets ===
==== North America ====
Nissan unveiled the eighth-generation Sentra for the North American market at the LA Auto Show in November 2019. It is powered by a naturally aspirated, 2.0-liter MR20DD inline four-cylinder gasoline engine, producing 149 hp (151 PS; 111 kW) and 198 N⋅m (20.2 kg⋅m; 146 lb⋅ft) of torque, along with a standard continuously variable transmission (Jatco CVT8) branded as Xtronic. No manual transmission option is offered in the United States, however it is offered in both Canada and Mexico.

The 2020 Sentra went on sale in the United States in late January 2020, with three trim levels offered: S, SV, and SR. All models are powered by a naturally aspirated Nissan MR engine 2.0-liter 4-cylinder gasoline direct injection engine mated to the Xtronic CVT. The Sentra S, SV and SR adopts a black interior color scheme. The Sentra SV Premium Package adopts a tan quilted leather on the seats and dash pad.

The model was introduced in Mexico in June 2020, being offered in four trim levels; Sense, Advance, SR, and Exclusive. The Mexican model offers the same trim lines as its North American model, albeit with different naming and an additional trim line known as Exclusive, which adds equipment to SR CVT.

The Sentra facelift was unveiled on 13 June 2023 for the 2024 model year. It features a redesigned front fascia and rear fascia with new headlights and the addition of engine start-stop technology.

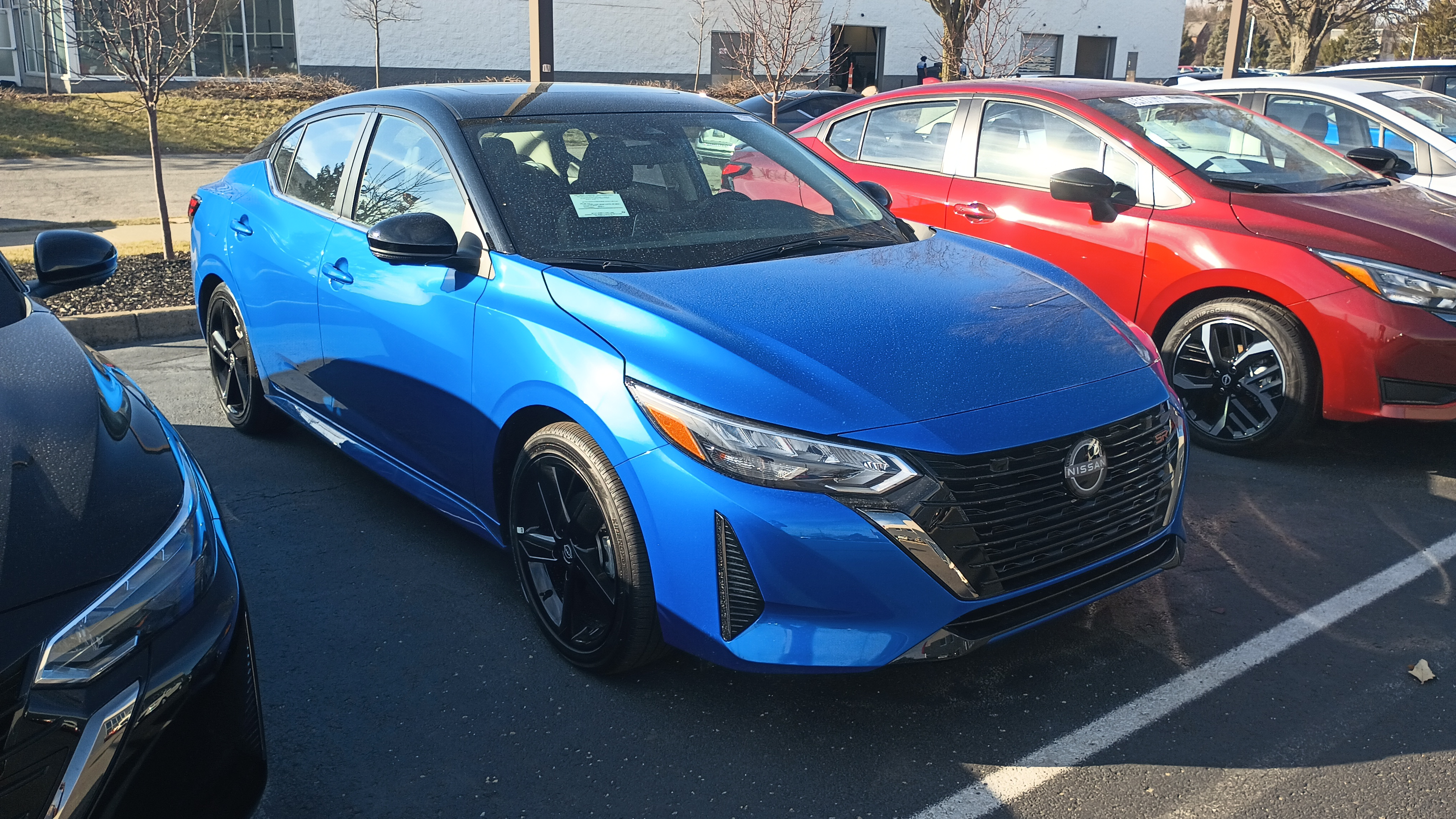
2024 Sentra SR (facelift, front view)

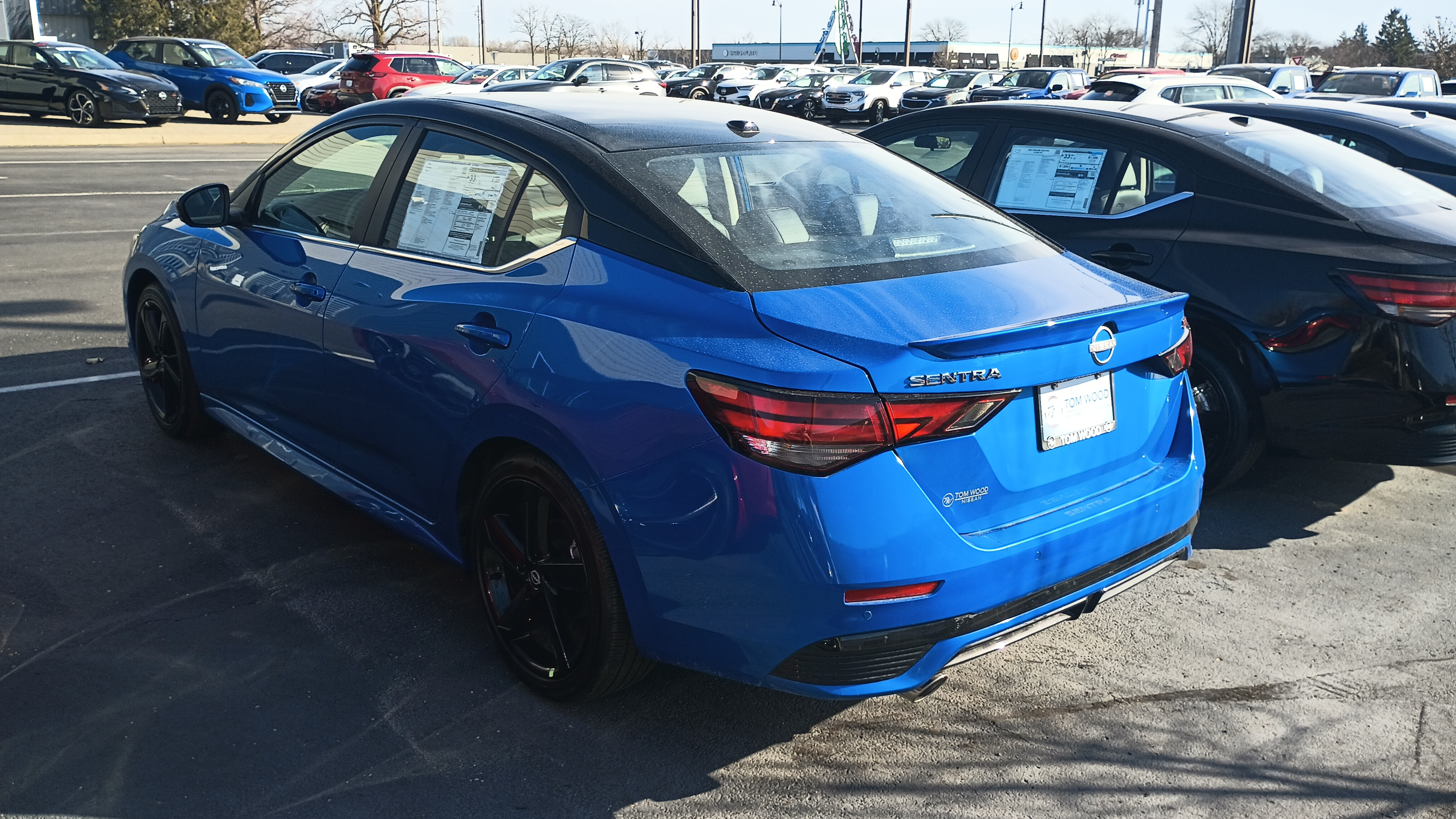
2024 Sentra SR (facelift, rear view)

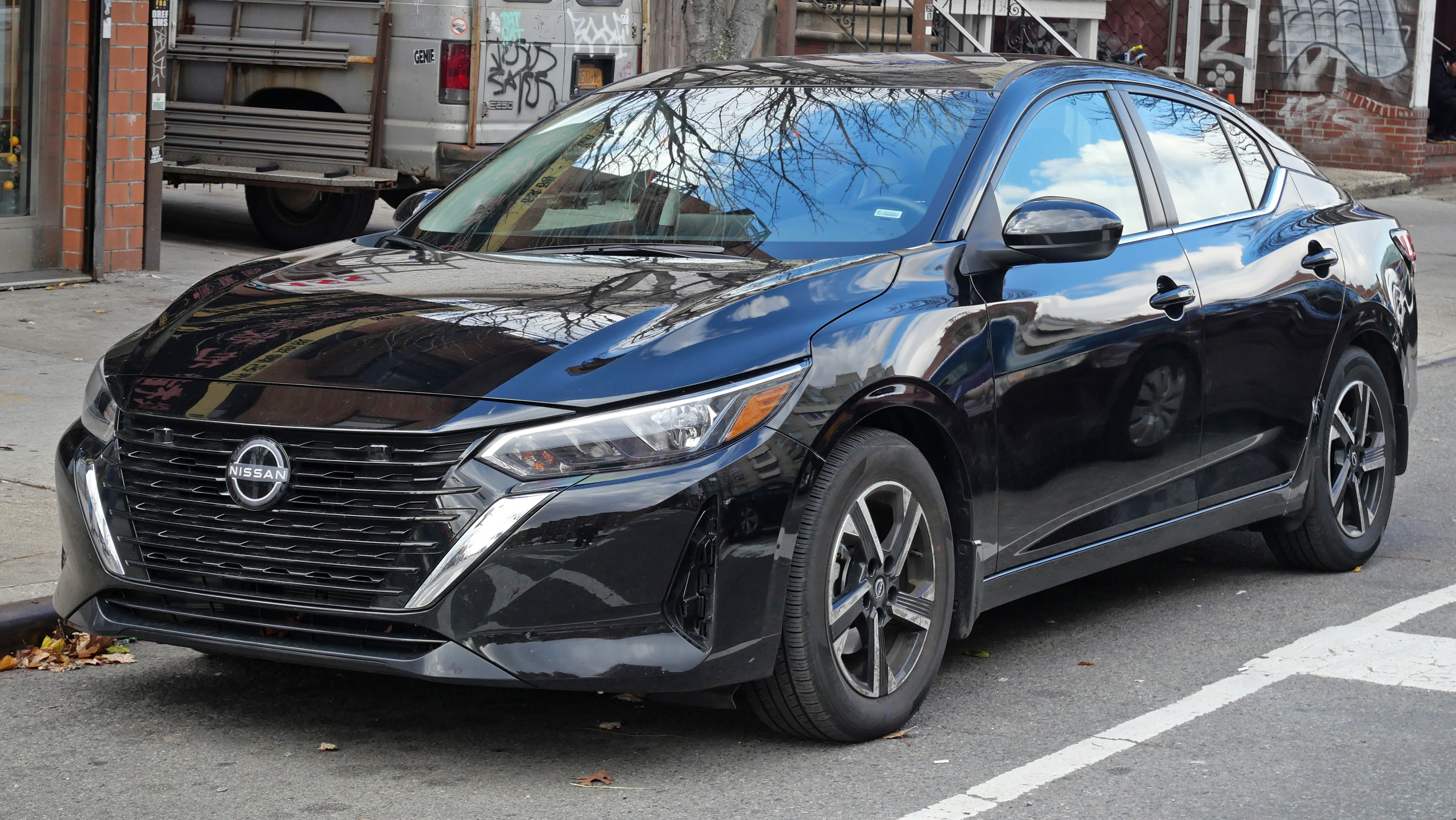
2024 Sentra SV (facelift, front view)

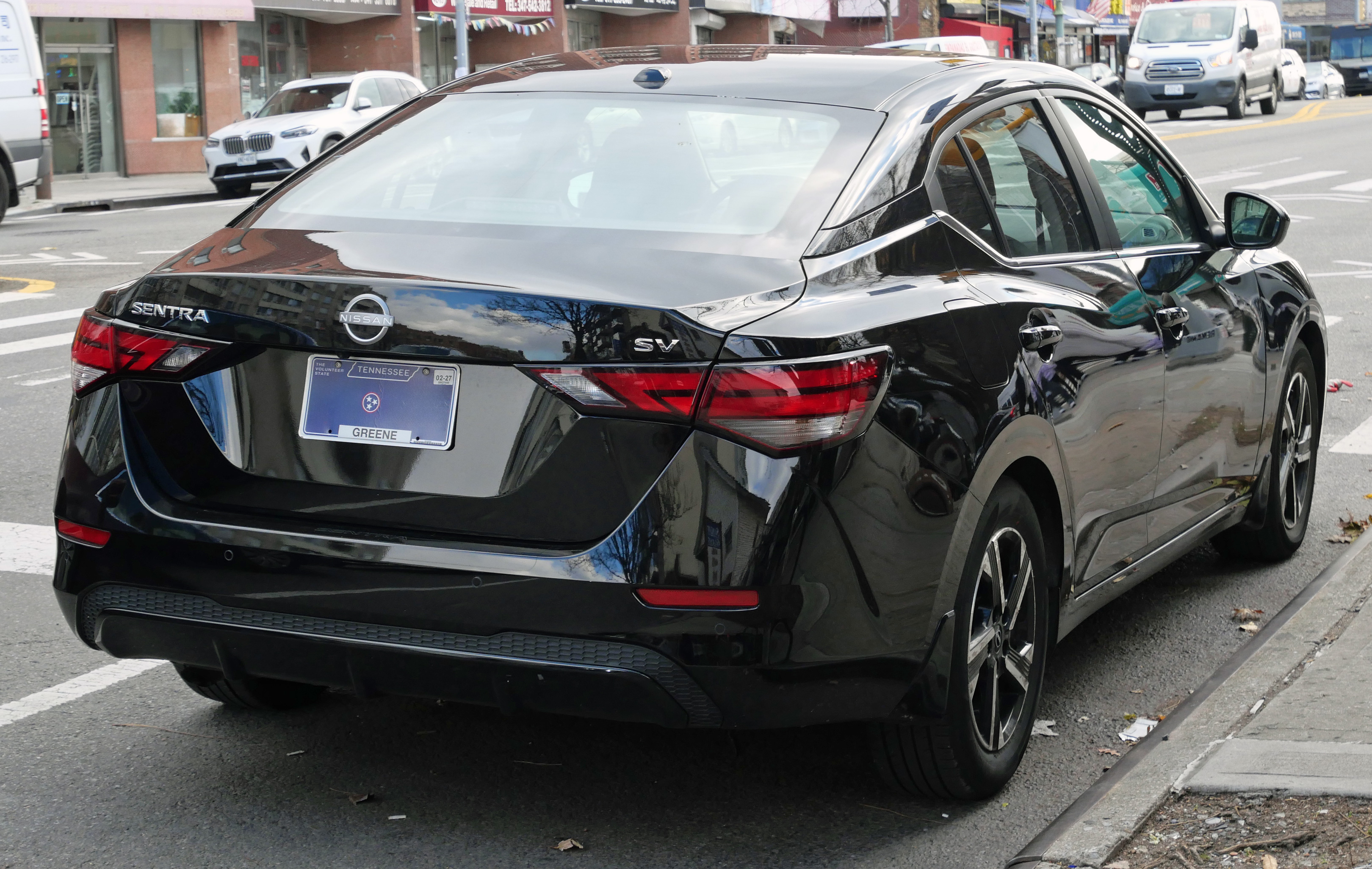
2024 Sentra SV (facelift, rear view)

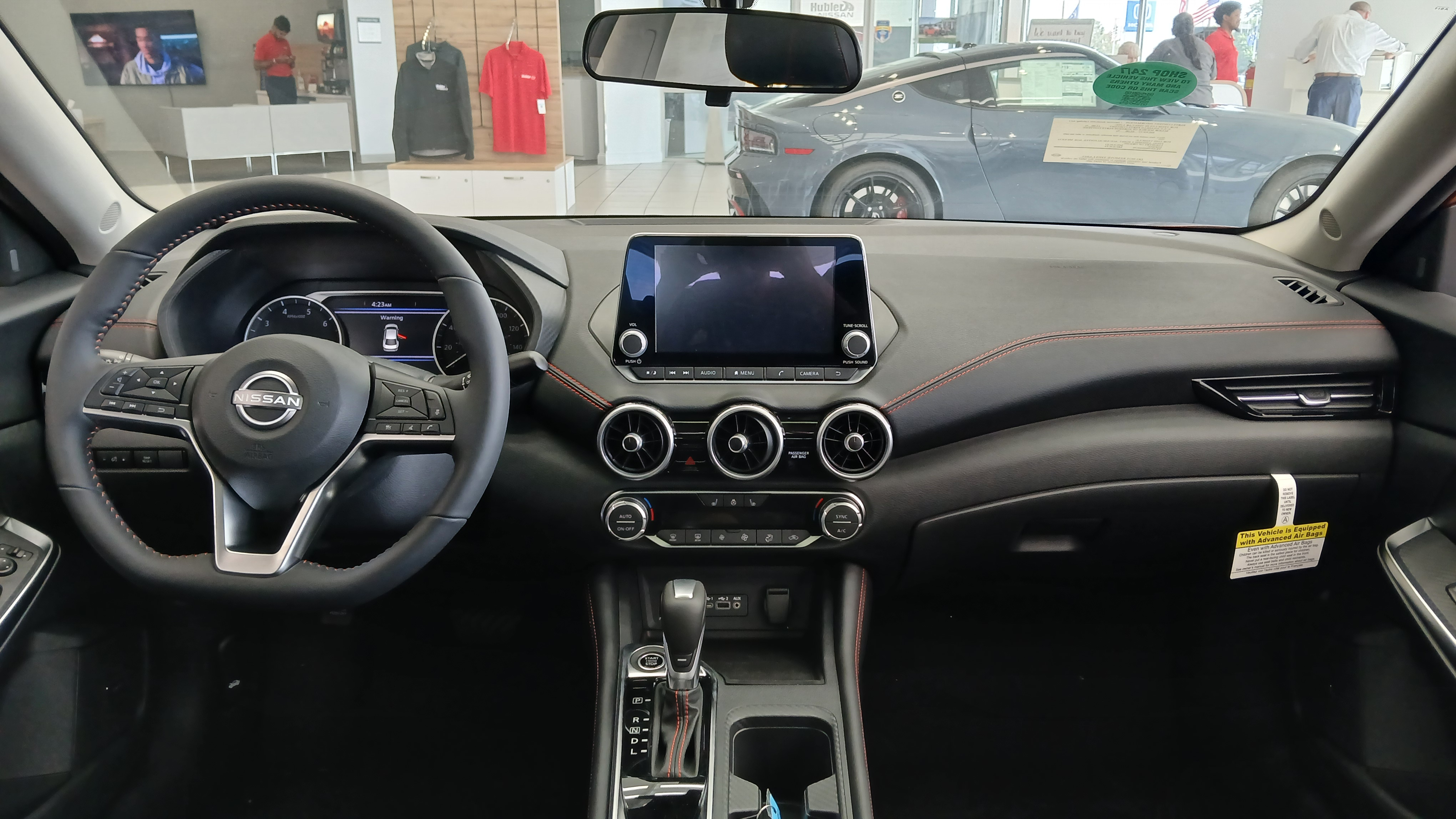
Interior (facelift)

==== China ====
Marketed as the Sylphy, the car was introduced in China in April 2019. Compared to the Sentra marketed in the Americas, the China and Taiwan market Sylphy adopts a simpler torsion beam suspension. The Sylphy is using the Jatco CVT7 WR gearbox while the Sentra is using the CVT8 gearbox.

The Sylphy e-Power was released in China in September 2021, with a redesigned front grille mesh and dashboard design.

The Sylphy facelift was unveiled on 15 March 2023. It features a redesigned front and rear fascia and redesigned headlights and taillights and the interior gets a 12.3-inch touchscreen.

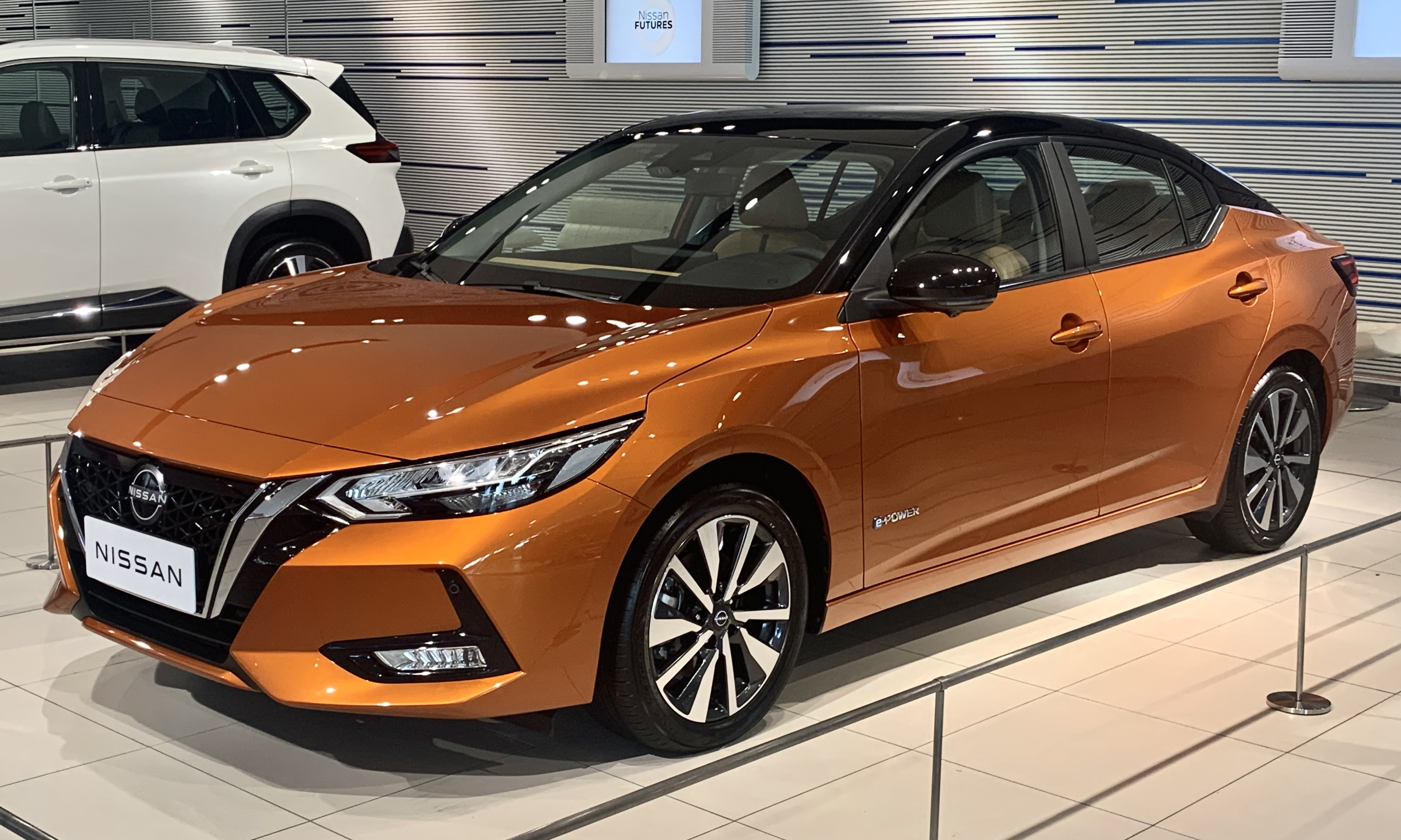
Nissan Sylphy e-Power (China)

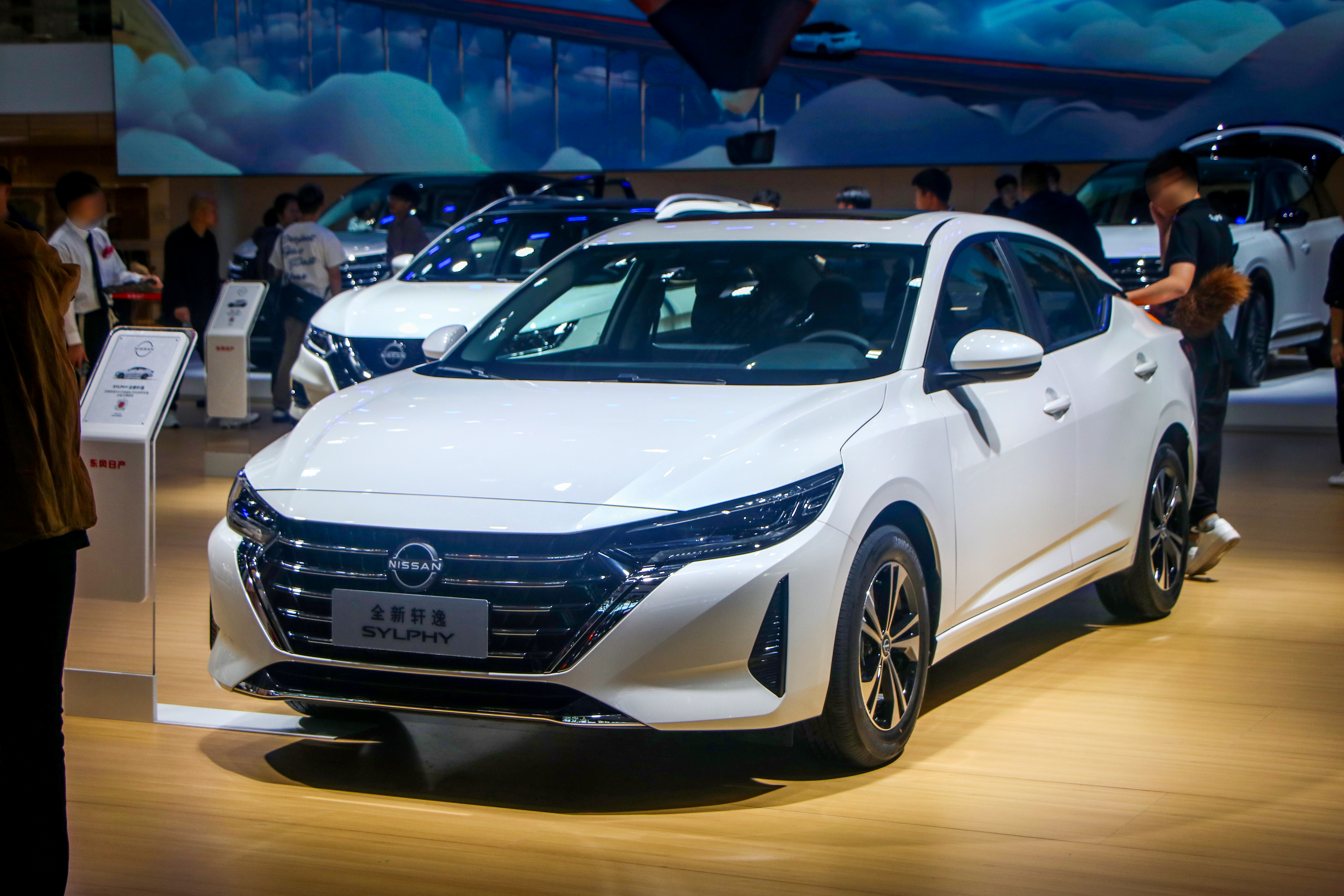
2023 Sylphy (facelift; China)

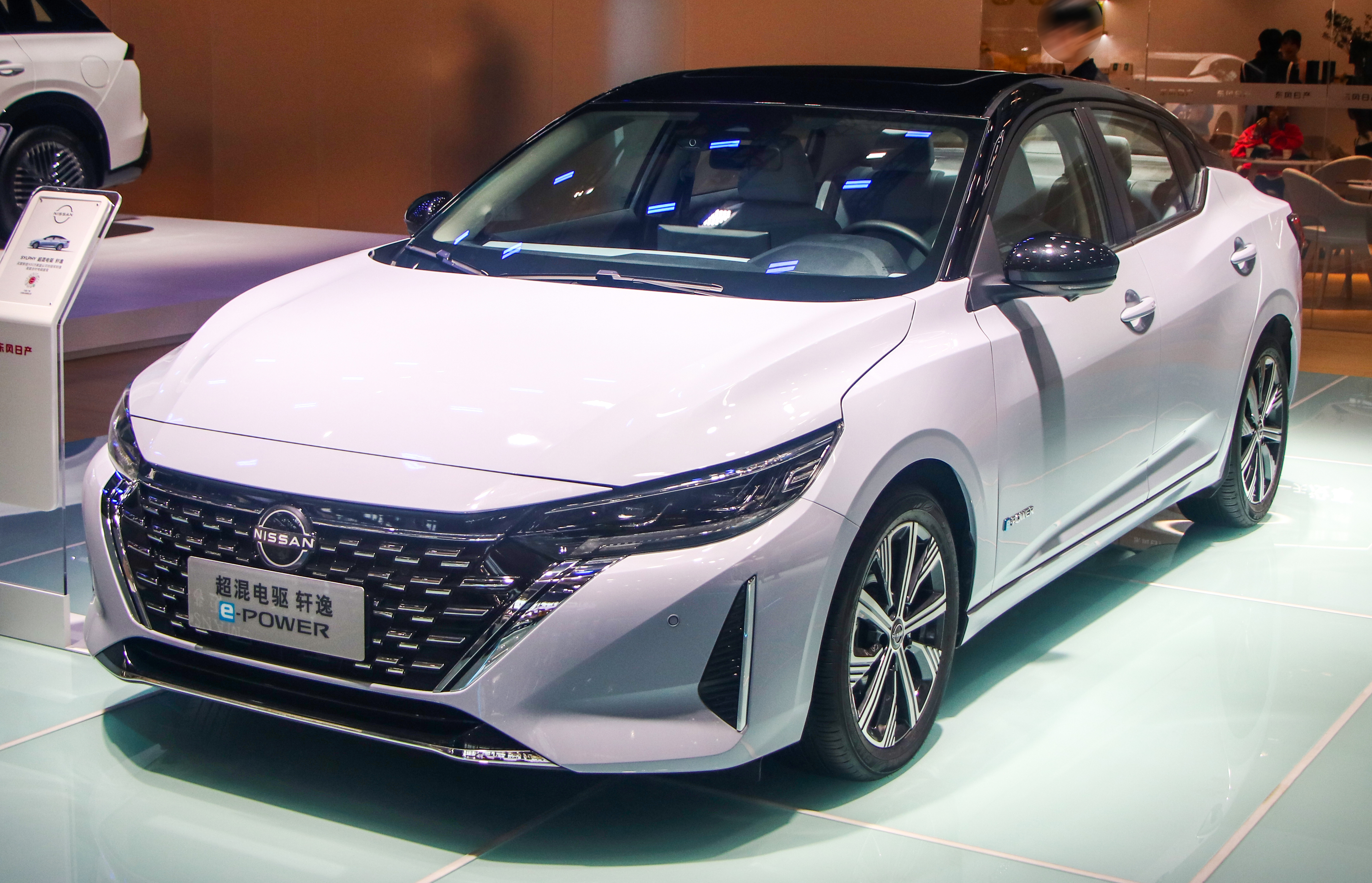
2023 Sylphy e-Power (facelift; China)

=== Recall ===
On 16 August 2021, PROFECO and Nissan Mexicana issued a recall on 18,857 Sentras of model years 2020 and 2021 in Mexico, due to a manufacturing defect of the steering rods (left or right) which could be bent, resulting in a misalignment in the direction of the car, vibrations while driving, and the breakage of the component that would lead to loss of the unit control.

=== Safety ===
The 2022 Sentra was tested by the IIHS and its top trim received a Top Safety Pick award:

IIHS scores
Small overlap front (Driver)	Good	
Small overlap front (Passenger)	Good	
Moderate overlap front	Good	
Side (original test)	Good	
Roof strength	Good	
Head restraints and seats	Good	
Headlights	Acceptable / Poor	varies by trim/option
Front crash prevention (Vehicle-to-Vehicle)	Superior	
Front crash prevention (Vehicle-to-Pedestrian, day)	Advanced	
Child seat anchors (LATCH) ease of use	Good+	

s inline with the international 2016 facelift versions, including new wheels, taillights and rear bumpers.

TNCAP (1.0) test result Nissan Sentra 'Nobility' (2025, similar to Euro NCAP 2017)
Test	Points	%
Overall:	5/5 stars	
Adult occupant:	35.456	93%
Child occupant:	37.804	77%
Pedestrian:	33.824	80%
Safety assist:	8.427	70%

== Ninth generation (B19; 2026) ==
Ninth generation
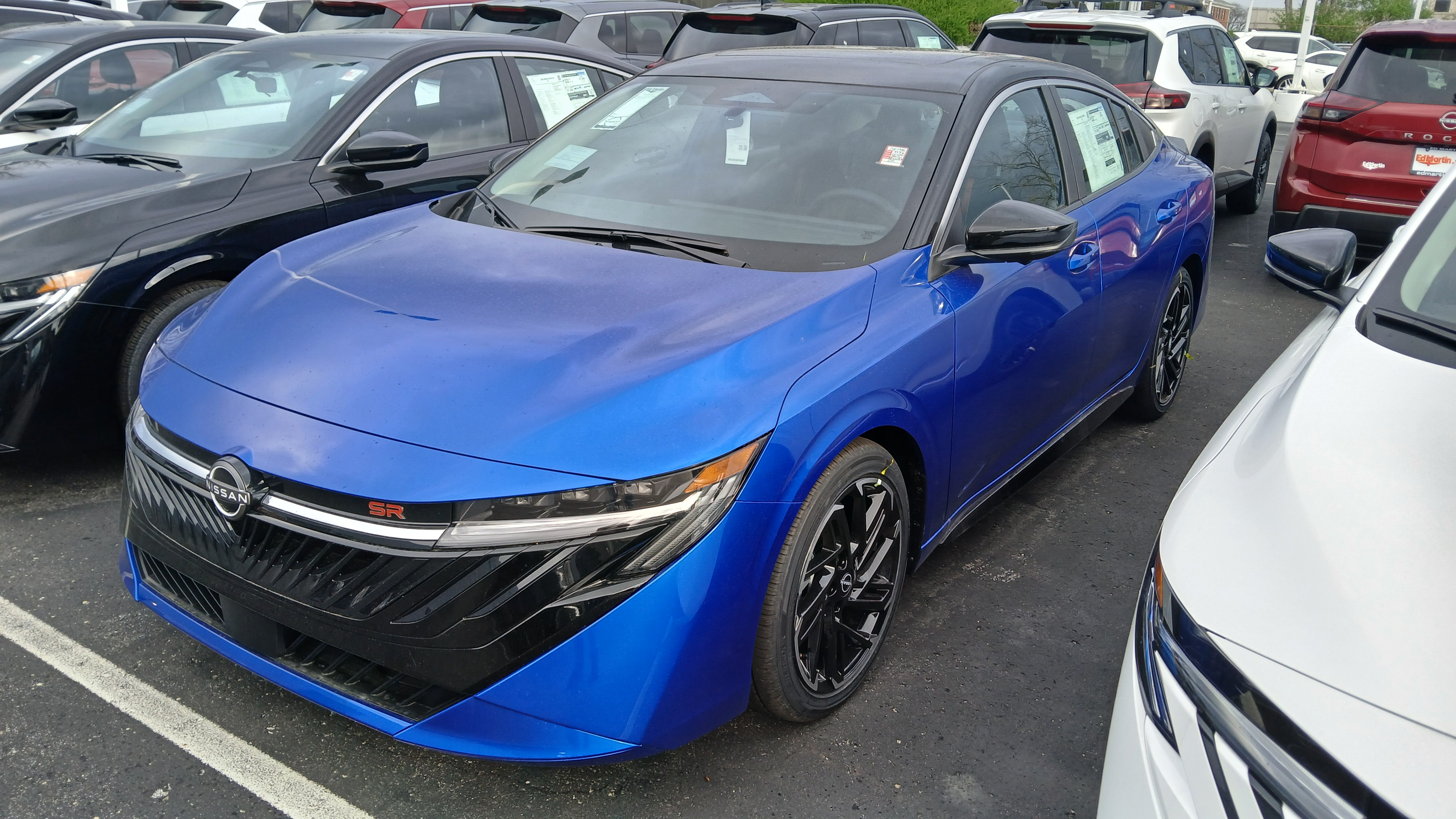
- 2026 Nissan Sentra SR

Overview
- Model code: B19
- Also called: Nissan Sylphy
- Production: 2025–present (North America); January 2026 – present (China)
- Model years: 2026–present
- Assembly: China: Guangzhou (DMCL); Mexico: Aguascalientes (Nissan Mexicana, A2)
- Designer: Lihao Yu

Body and chassis
- Body style: 4-door sedan
- Layout: Front-engine, front-wheel-drive
- Platform: Renault–Nissan CMF-CD platform

Powertrain
- Engine: Gasoline; 1.6 L HR16DE I4 (Sylphy, China); 2.0 L MR20DD I4
- Power output: 149 hp (111 kW; 151 PS)
- Transmission: Xtronic CVT

Dimensions
- Wheelbase: 106.5 in (2,705 mm)
- Length: 183.3 in (4,656 mm)
- Width: 71.5 in (1,816 mm)
- Height: 57.0 in (1,448 mm)
- Curb weight: 3,097.5–3,174.7 lb (1,405–1,440 kg)

The ninth-generation Sentra was shown to the public on September 23, 2025 as a 2026 model.

The total length of the car increased by 0.6 inches (15 mm), from 182.7 inches (4,641 mm) to 183.3 inches (4,656 mm), while the wheelbase has decreased by 0.1 inches (3 mm). The ninth-generation Sentra features a redesigned front and rear fascia intended to increase efficiency and aerodynamics while bringing the design in line with the new Leaf and Ariya. Reportedly, it has 6% more structural rigidity than the previous model.

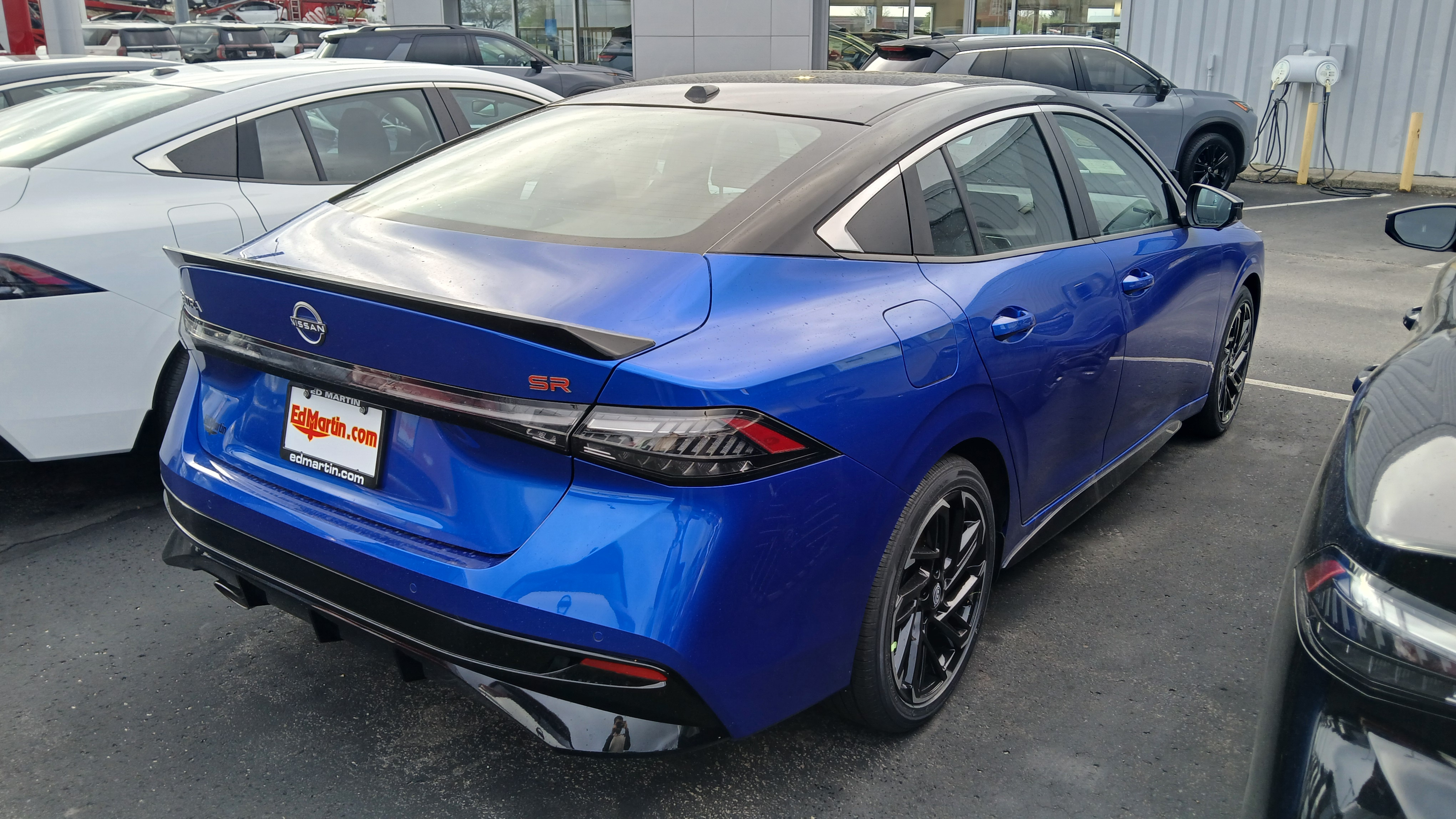
Rear view

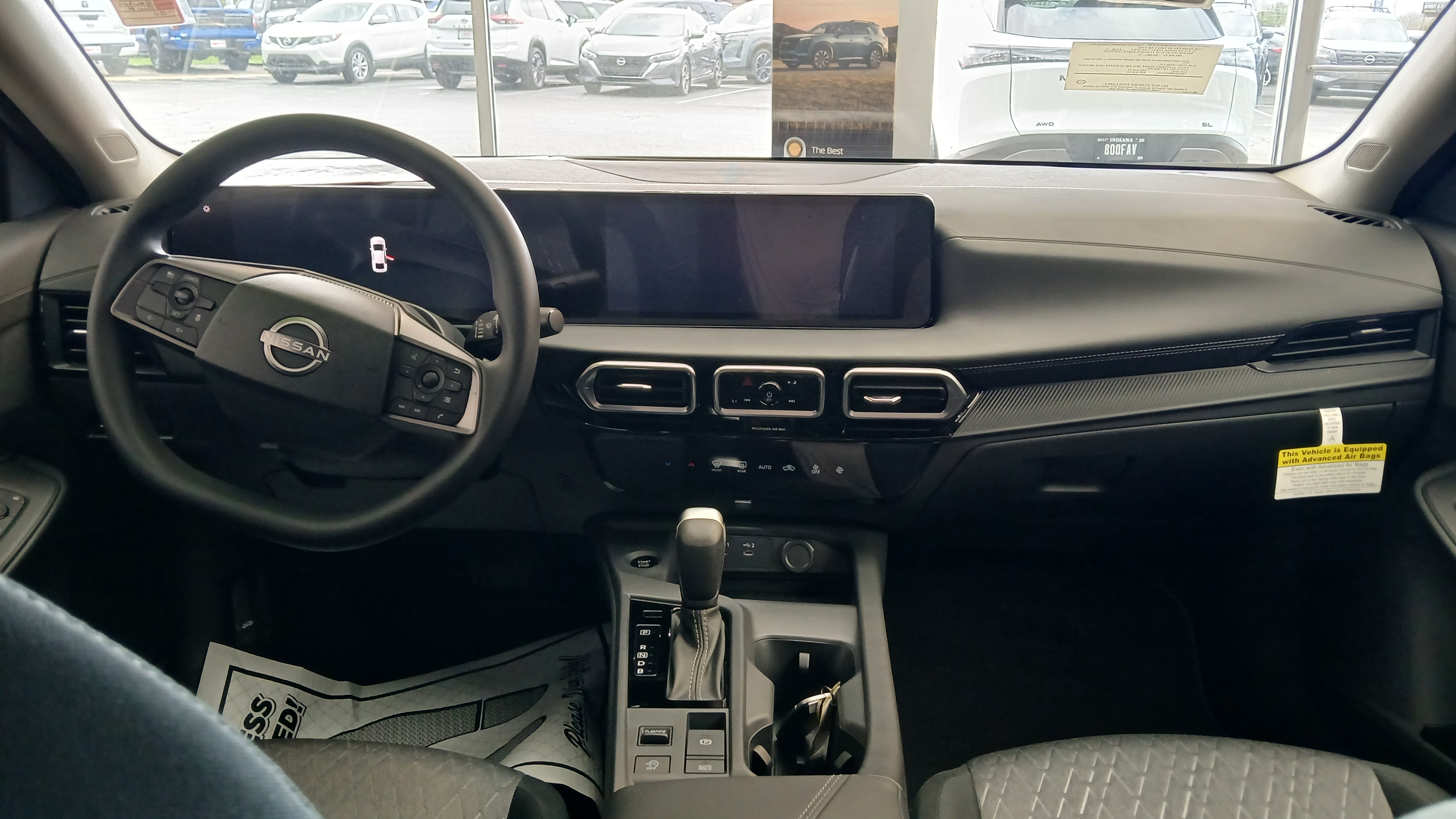
Interior

=== Markets ===
==== North America ====
In the United States, the ninth generation Nissan Sentra is available in four trims: S, SV, SR, and SL.

==== China ====
It was previewed early by the fifth-generation Nissan Sylphy in China on 11 September 2025. and was released in China in February 2026.

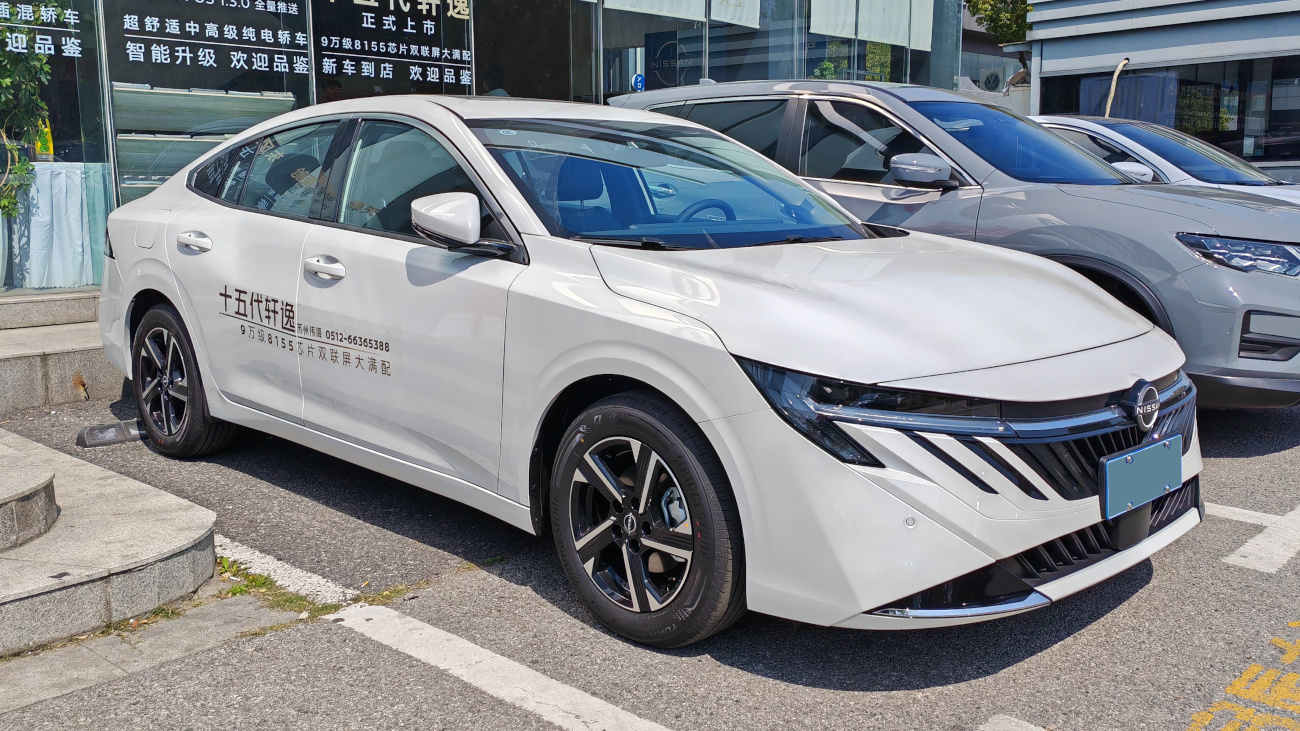
Nissan Sylphy (China)

=== Powertrain ===
The ninth generation Sentra is based on the same platform as the previous generation and carries over the same 2.0-liter MR20DD naturally aspirated inline-four engine producing 149 hp (111 kW) and 146 lb⋅ft (198 N⋅m) of torque. The CVT is also carried over and is retuned for more linear power delivery. The 1.6-liter engine installed in the Chinese market Sylphy produces 135 PS (99 kW).

=== Design and features ===
The SR model features a blacked-out grille and accents, and a two-tone roof, and Optional equipment on the top SL and SR trims includes a 8-speaker Bose system, heated mirrors, and a powered moonroof on the top-trim models.

The inverted trapezoidal grille forms a V-shape, similar to that of other Nissan cars using the V-Motion grille. Slim daytime running lights are also present at the front, spanning the entire width between the headlights, just above the grille. A similar lighting design is also present in the back. The ninth generation Sentra uses a fastback bodystyle. The front lighting is similar to that of the third-generation Nissan Leaf.

All Sentra trims now come with a 12.3-inch center touchscreen. The base S trim comes with a 7.0-inch driver's display, while all other versions receive a 12.3-inch digital instrument cluster, and also requires corded versions of Apple CarPlay and Android Auto, while all other trims have wireless Apple CarPlay and Android Auto. A redesigned dashboard with haptic buttons is also present, sitting below the touchscreen, along with a new 2-spoke steering wheel and more soft-touch surfaces.

== Other versions ==
=== New Zealand ===
In countries such as New Zealand, vehicles from both the Nissan Sunny and Nissan Pulsar ranges were marketed as a single model range (with the exception of the Pulsar, which included an EXA model identical to the North American Pulsar), the "Nissan Sentra", which differed (apart from the station wagon) from the models sold under the same name in the United States.

The Sentra name was adopted in several other countries, such as New Zealand, where it was used for the Nissan Pulsar range from 1986 (although the station wagon version was actually a rebadged Nissan Sunny California). The Sentra name continued to be used in New Zealand for the Pulsar until 1998, just as Almera was used in Europe. After 2002, the Pulsar name was adopted.

Unlike the North American version, a hatchback was offered; engines offered were 1.4 L, 1.6 L and 2.0 L gasoline engines; a diesel was available in Europe. Some were sold in the Republic of Ireland.

=== Southeast Asia ===
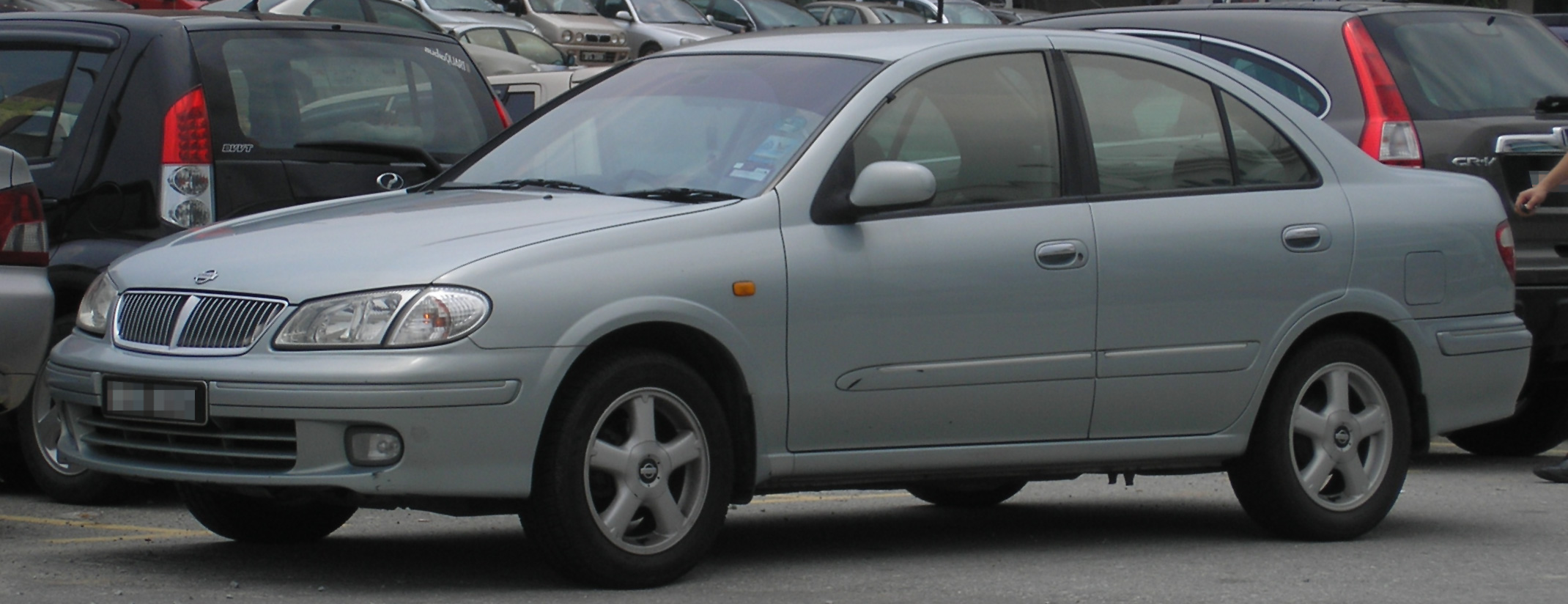
The pre-facelift Nissan Sentra N16 marketed in Southeast Asia, largely the same model as the contemporary Nissan Bluebird Sylphy (Japan), Nissan Pulsar (Australia) or Nissan Almera (Europe).

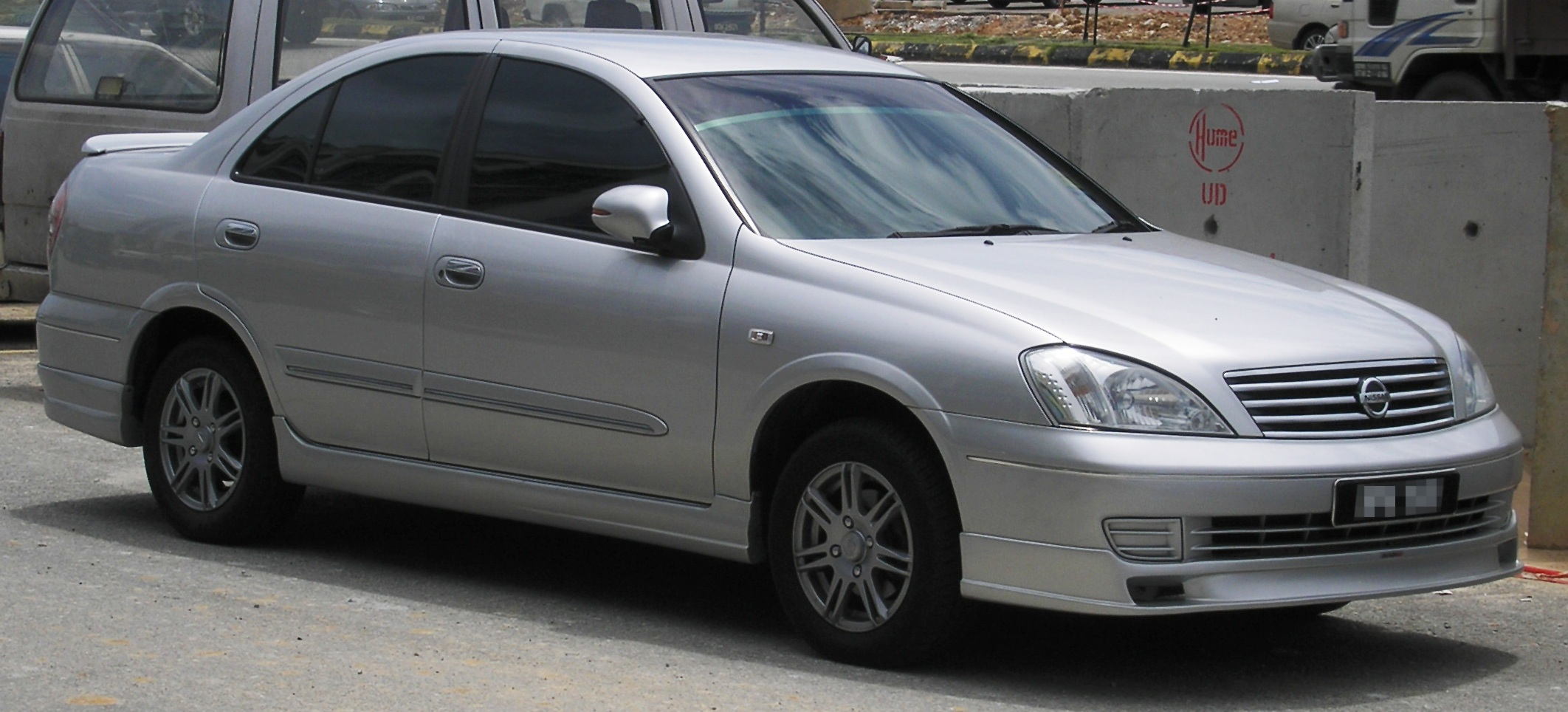
The facelift model of the Nissan Sentra N16, also marketed as the Nissan Sunny in Hong Kong, Singapore, Thailand and Sri Lanka.

In Southeast Asia, the Nissan Bluebird Sylphy N16 was marketed as the Nissan Sentra in Taiwan, Malaysia, Indonesia and the Philippines. A facelifted version was introduced specifically for this region at the end of 2005, which was offered instead of the second generation Nissan Bluebird Sylphy, also launched at the end of 2005.

In Taiwan, Yulon has built its licensed version of the Sunny as the Sentra since 1990. The Taiwanese-market Sentra reflects the styling of the Japanese-market Bluebird Sylphy (also as the Almera/Pulsar sedan but with a luxury emphasis). This N16 model is called Sentra M1. The Nissan Sentra nameplate returned in October 2013 as B17, marketed as Nissan Super Sentra.

In Indonesia, the first and second generations Sentra were the Sunny-based B12 and B13 models respectively. The 1988–1990 B12 was offered as SGX Sedan and SR Coupe. The B13 was nicknamed Sentra Genesis, only sold as sedan from 1991 to 1996. After skipping six years, Nissan re-introduced the Sentra in Indonesia in 2002. The Sentra was now based on the N16 Pulsar or Nissan Bluebird Sylphy. It is only powered by a 1.8-liter QG18 engine matched to a 4-speed automatic transmission. The Sentra was only offered in luxury Super Saloon trim level, loaded with standard ABS and leather interior. However, it was sold only in small numbers until 2004.

The Philippines also used the Sentra name for its version of the Pulsar. The N16 model was known as the Nissan Sentra Exalta (available from 2001 to 2003). The early model is similar to the JDM Bluebird Sylphy. Nissan Philippines introduced a model with new headlights and tail lights, that was later renamed back to Sentra (2004-2014). This model was known as the Sunny Neo in Thailand. These N16 Sentras is powered by QG series engines. In 2010, the Sentra B16 became available in the Philippines marketed as the new Nissan Sentra 200 with an MR20 engine.

== Sales ==
Year	U.S.	Canada	Mexico	Brazil
1985	219,024			
1986	211,494			
1987	235,945			
1988	247,109			
1989	221,292			
1990	159,054			
1991	146,618		77,686	
1992	158,909			
1993	168,838			
1994	172,148		98,387	
1995	134,854		24,963	
1996	129,593		23,647	
1997	122,468		40,901	
1998	88,363		68,725	
1999	63,134			
2000	98,803			
2001	111,082		101,594	
2002	106,060		80,237	
2003	94,500		63,702	
2004	106,934		68,603	15
2005	119,489	11,069	33,370	423
2006	117,922	8,656	33,930	758
2007	106,522	8,563	18,924	5,310
2008	99,797	11,000	17,858	6,849
2009	82,706	13,431	13,221	5,740
2010	94,065	14,651	19,836	5,943
2011	114,991	12,880	20,309	10,490
2012	106,395	11,008	23,244	8,344
2013	129,143	14,407	28,538	6,751
2014	183,268	15,021	28,551	14,270
2015	203,509	14,940	35,996	12,493
2016	214,709	13,306	45,977	6,290
2017	218,451	13,883	42,746	3,862
2018	213,046	12,593	34,365	4,423
2019	184,618	7,719	21,904	3,190
2020	94,646	6,806	16,825	951
2021	127,861	10,015	22,469	8
2022	77,123	8,257	21,032	
2023	109,195	8,328	26,982	4,146
2024	152,659	11,541	23,694	6,021
2025	152,578	9,592	21,929	4,927
