= Taxi livery =

Insignia or color patterns of taxicabs

Taxi livery varies greatly from country to country. In some countries, livery is determined by government legislation, and in others, taxi operators have choice on colours.

== Africa ==
=== Egypt ===
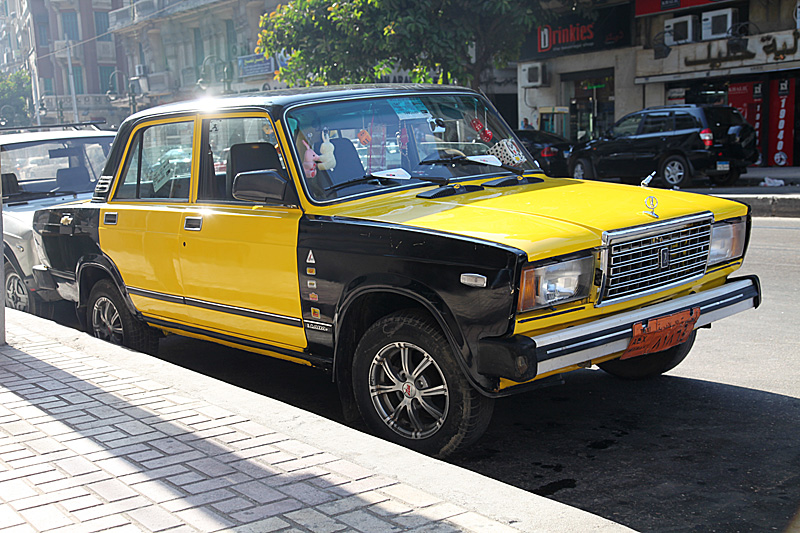
Taxi in Alexandria, Egypt

In Egypt, taxi liveries vary by governorate. The most iconic Egyptian taxis are those of Cairo (navy blue and white) and Alexandria (yellow and black), although a new Cairo livery (white with a black-and-white checkered stripe along the centre) has arisen in recent years, indicating those taxis with working meters.

=== Ethiopia ===
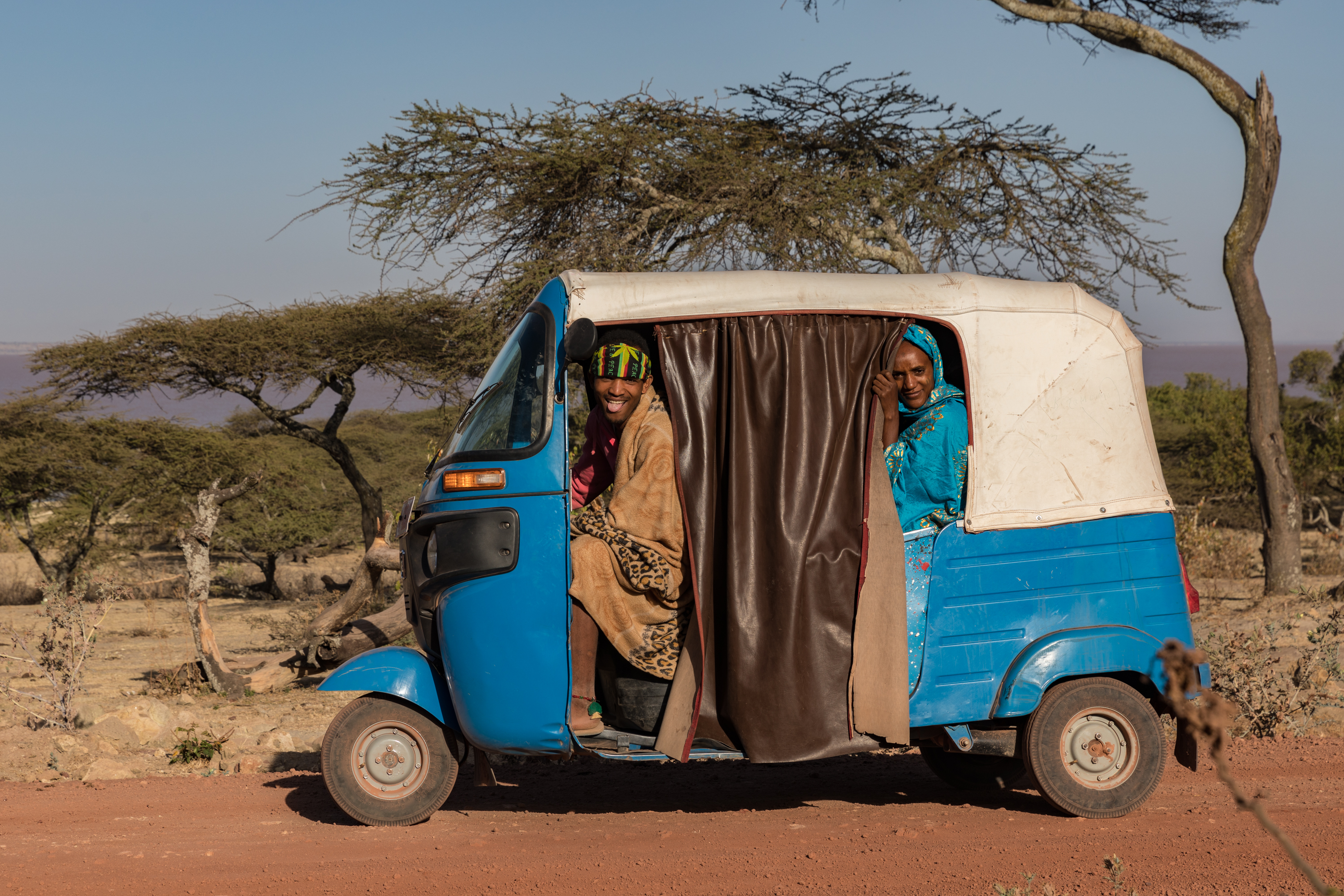
Taxi in Oromia Region, Ethiopia

In Ethiopia, taxis are generally blue and white, with white tops and blue bodies. Newer metered taxis are often yellow and green but have no set livery.

=== Eritrea ===
In Eritrea, all taxis are yellow. In Asmara, official cabs are all yellow with no specific liveries, yet minibuses can occasionally be found with white liveries. The taxis in Massawa are often large, like a minibus.

=== Nigeria ===
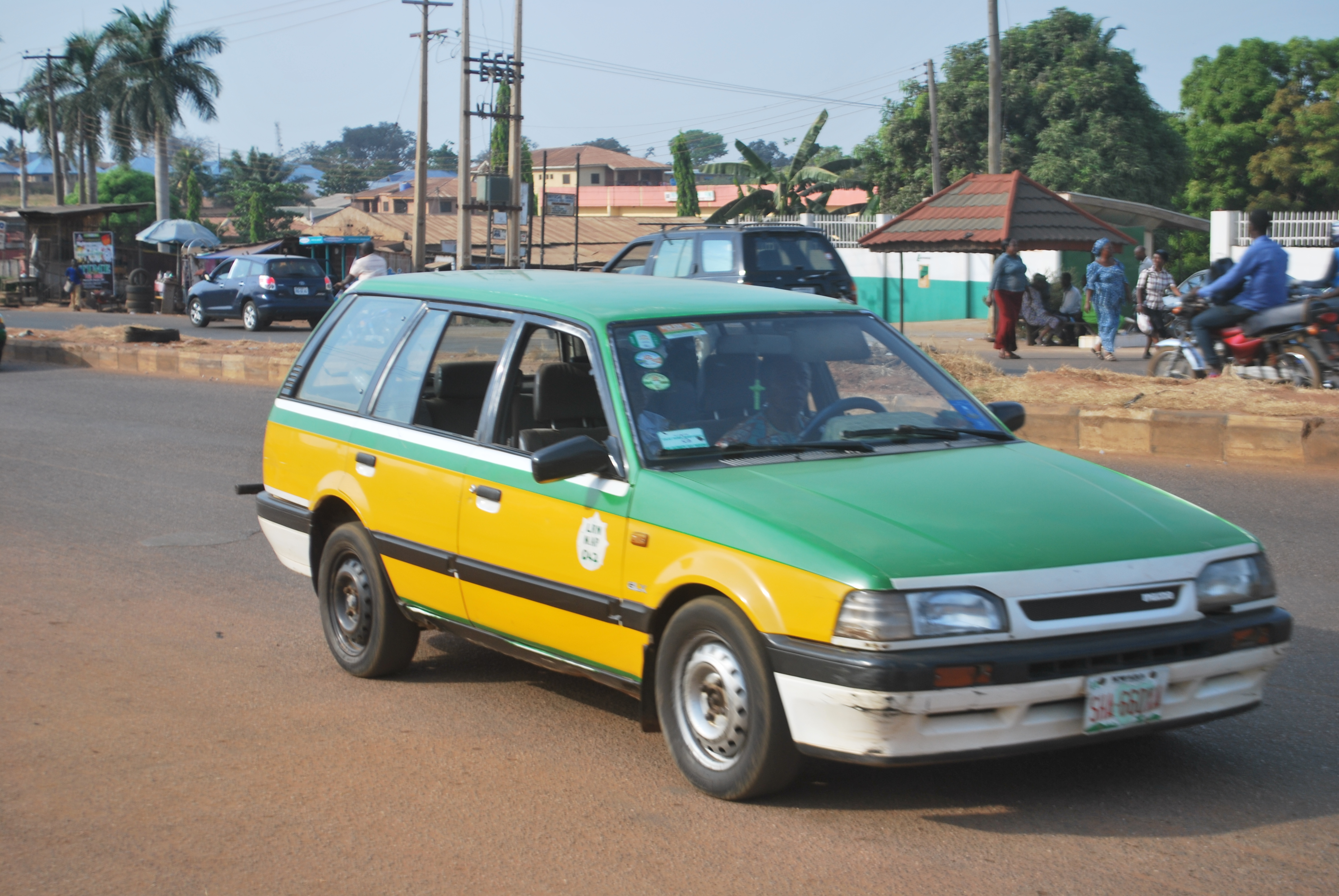
Taxi in Ilorin, Nigeria

In Nigeria, each state has its own taxi livery, most notable being the yellow with black stripes of Lagos State taxis, mostly privately owned.

== Asia ==
=== Hong Kong ===
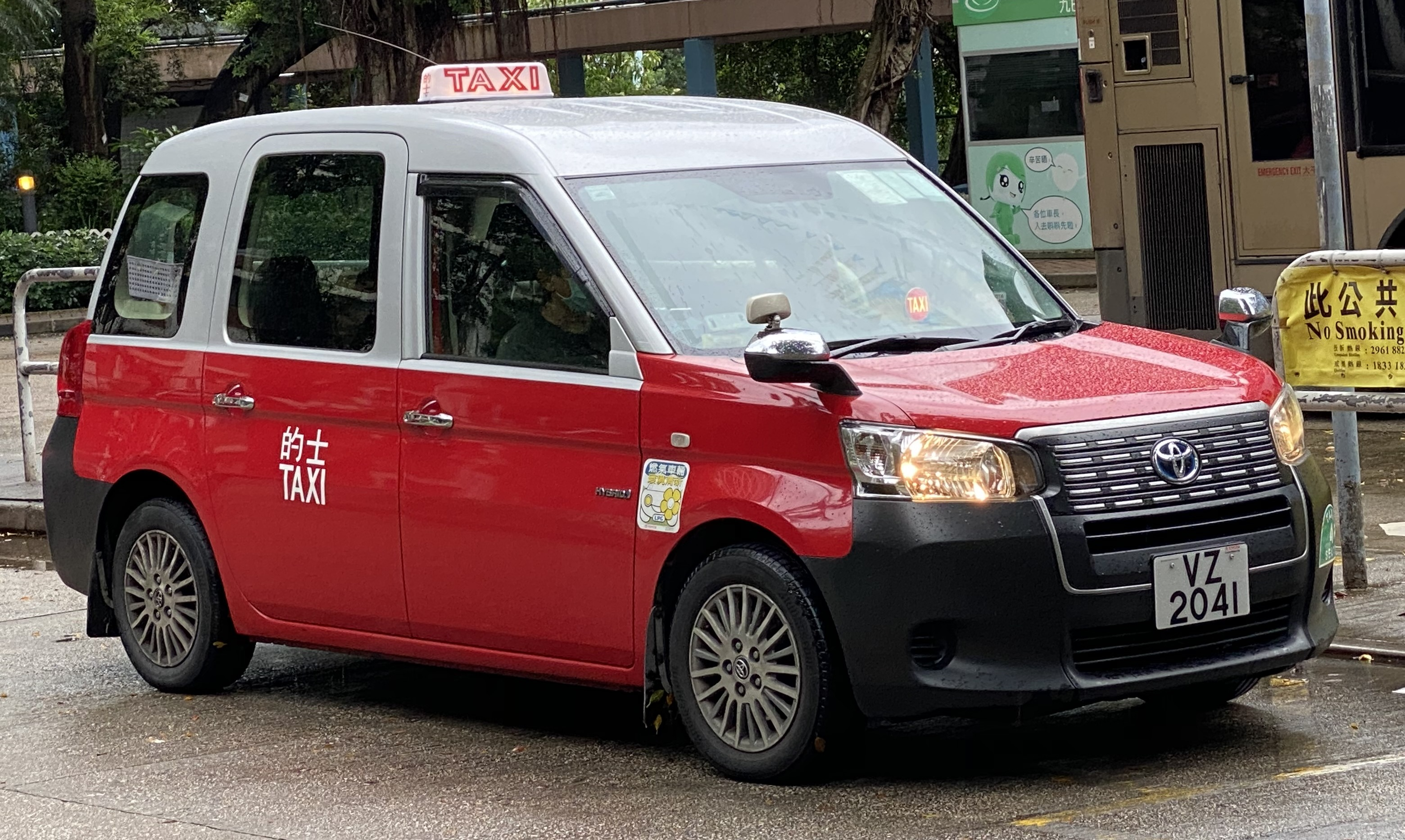
Red taxi in Hong Kong

Taxis of Hong Kong have three colour schemes based on service area: red with silver top for urban Hong Kong and Kowloon, as well as New Kowloon, Kwai Chung and Tsing Yi, most of Tseung Kwan O, and much of Sha Tin and Tsuen Wan; green with white top for the New Territories except the Lantau; and blue with white top for Lantau Island. The different service areas are to even out service between less densely populated areas and the urban centres in the territory. Most taxis in Hong Kong are Toyota Crown Comfort or JPN. Other models include Nissan NV200 and Ford Transit Connect.

=== Indonesia ===
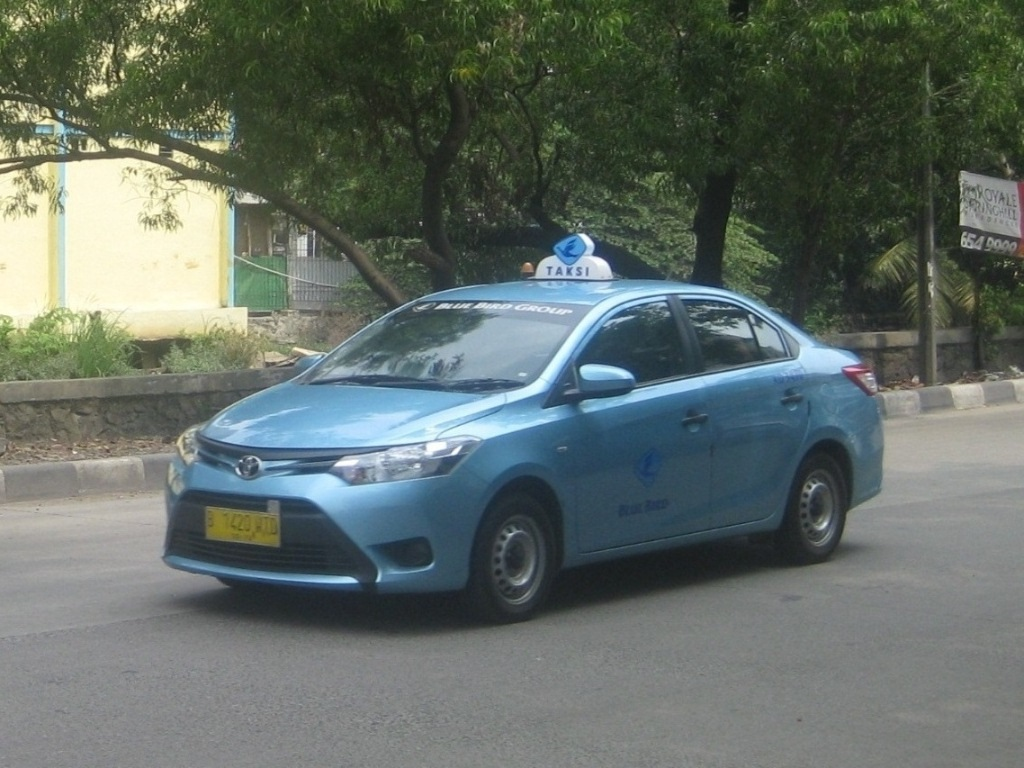
Toyota Limo (NCP150) taxi in Indonesia

In Indonesia, there are many private companies operating taxis that have their own distinctive liveries. Limo, Almera, Mobilio and Transmover are the common cars used for the regular taxis. VIP or executive taxis are painted in black. The first car used for the executive taxi was Nissan Cedric Y31 diesel. Now they are using Toyota Camry, Toyota Alphard, Toyota Vellfire, and different models of Mercedes-Benz.

=== India ===
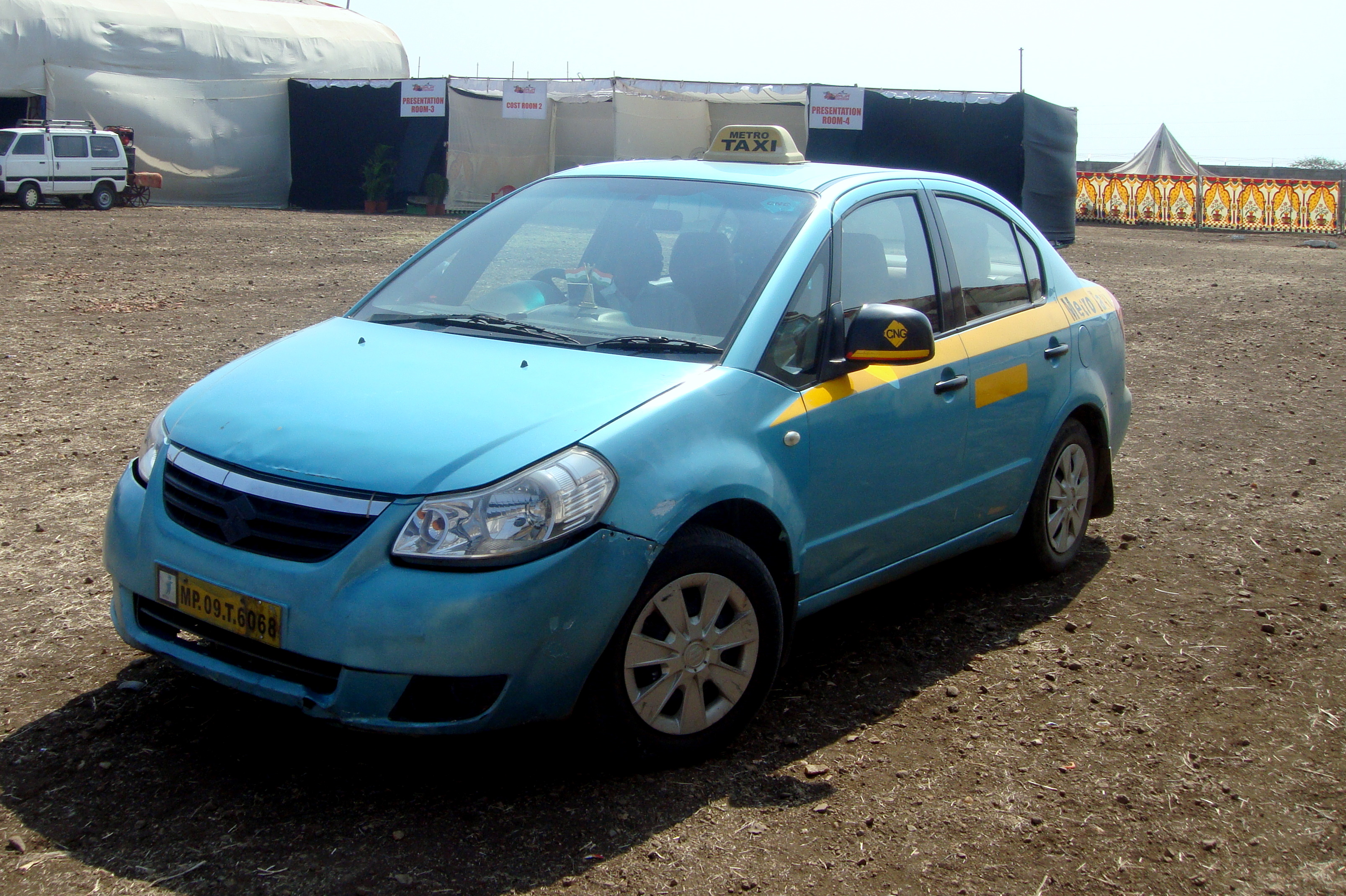
A radio taxi in Indore, India

In India, most taxis, especially those in Delhi and Mumbai, have distinctive black and yellow liveries with the bottom half painted black and upper half painted yellow. In Kolkata, most taxis are painted yellow with a blue strip in the middle (earlier in Kolkata it used to be yellow and black). However taxis are more common in Mumbai and Kolkata and not so much in Delhi (where autorickshaws are a more common sight). Private companies operating taxis can have their own liveries but need to get them approved from the government. Taxis and all other commercial vehicles have a yellow number plate and pay higher taxes.

=== Israel ===
In Israel, taxis are painted white with a yellow cap on top.

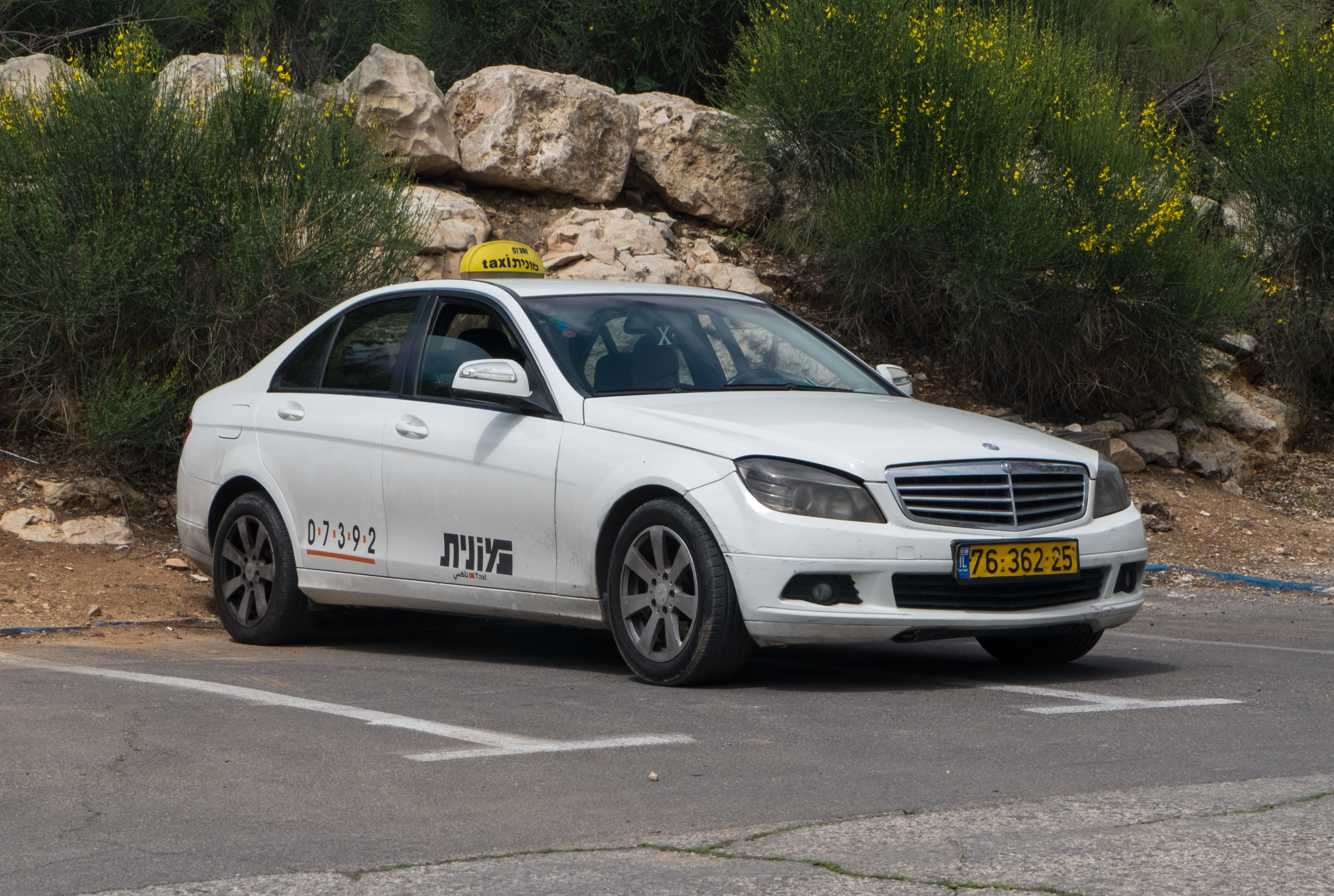
Mercedes-Benz taxi in Israel

=== Japan ===
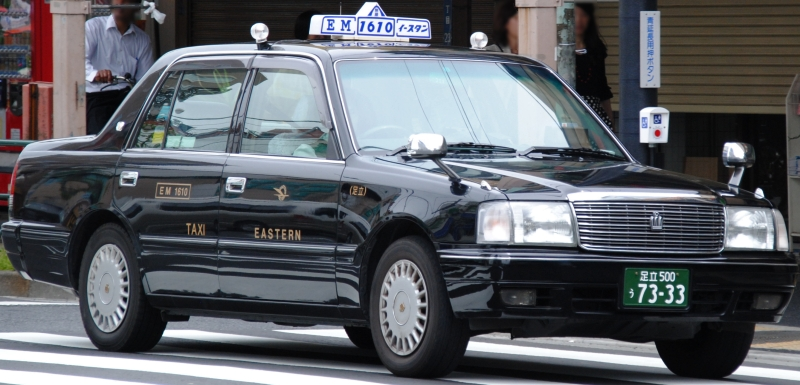
Toyota Crown taxi in Tokyo, Japan

In Japan, taxis each have color or designs based on the company. Most Japanese taxis are one of three types of cars: the Toyota Comfort; Nissan Crew; and Nissan Cedric Y31. They all have automatic passenger doors, which open when a button is pressed by the driver. However, elite taxis may have drivers that manually open the door for the passenger.

In 2017, Toyota introduced the hybrid electric and wheelchair accessible JPN Taxi as a successor to the Comfort to meet Japan's fuel efficiency and accessibility goals. As of May 2018, the JPN Taxi accounted for around 10% of Tokyo taxis, while the traditional Toyota Comfort model accounted for around 70%. By mid-2020, Toyota expects the JPN Taxi to account for about one-third of the Tokyo fleet.

=== Malaysia ===
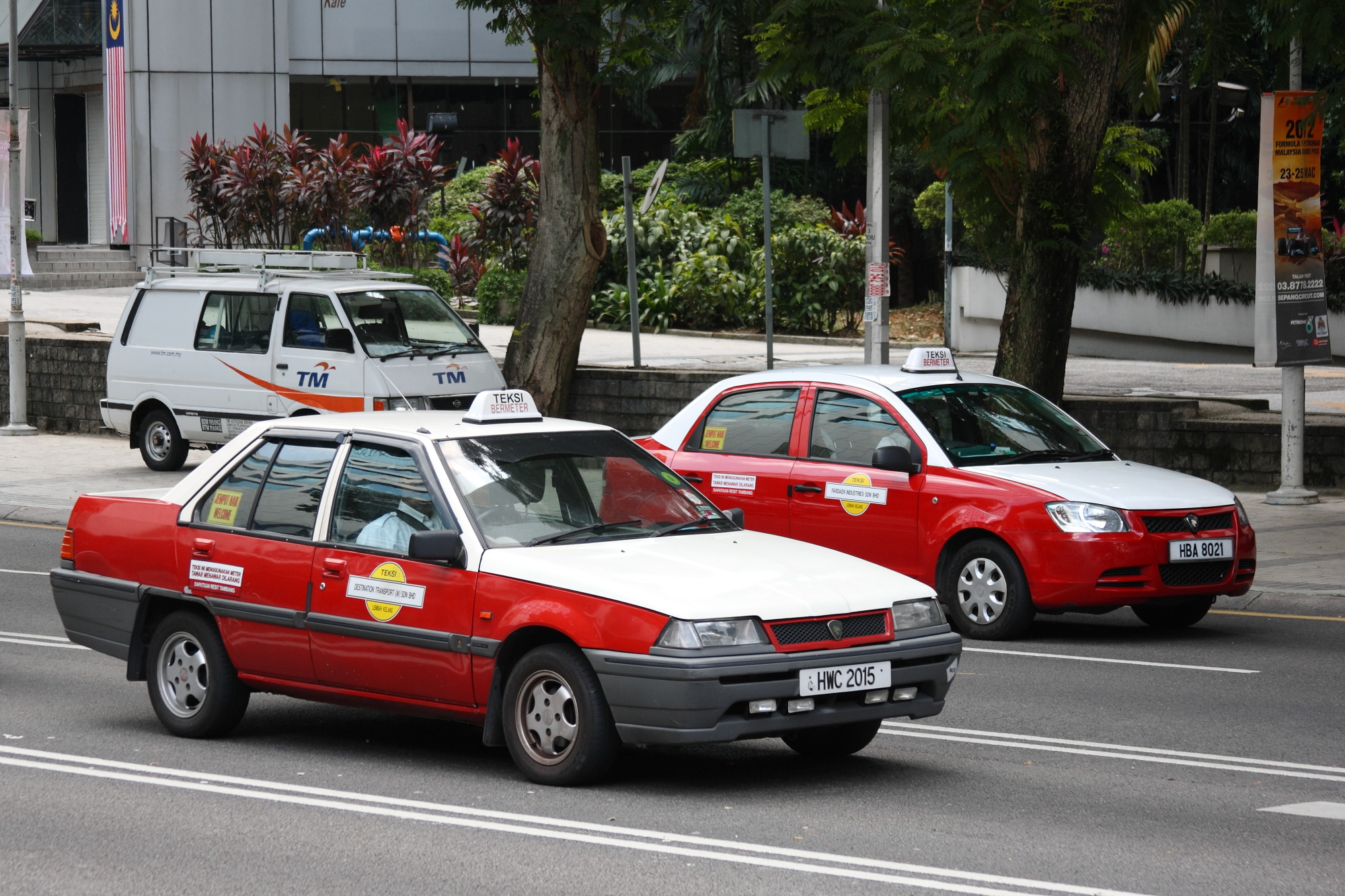
Taxis in Kuala Lumpur, Malaysia

In Malaysia, most taxis have distinctive white and red liveries. In Kuala Lumpur, well established meter taxi companies with more than 7500 units have bright orange colour liveries with approval from the government. Private taxi operators however can be differentiated by the white and red livery while premium Executive taxis can be seen in blue livery.

=== Pakistan ===
Most taxis in Pakistan are yellow painted while some old ones also run here with black colour and small of the upper half is yellow painted. There are also some privately owned companies and latest model cabs in metropolitan areas such as Karachi, Lahore and Islamabad. These private companies use latest model locally assembled Toyota Corolla and Suzuki liana. There are also some companies offering Japan assembled cars in which Mitsubishi Lancer is popular.

=== Philippines ===
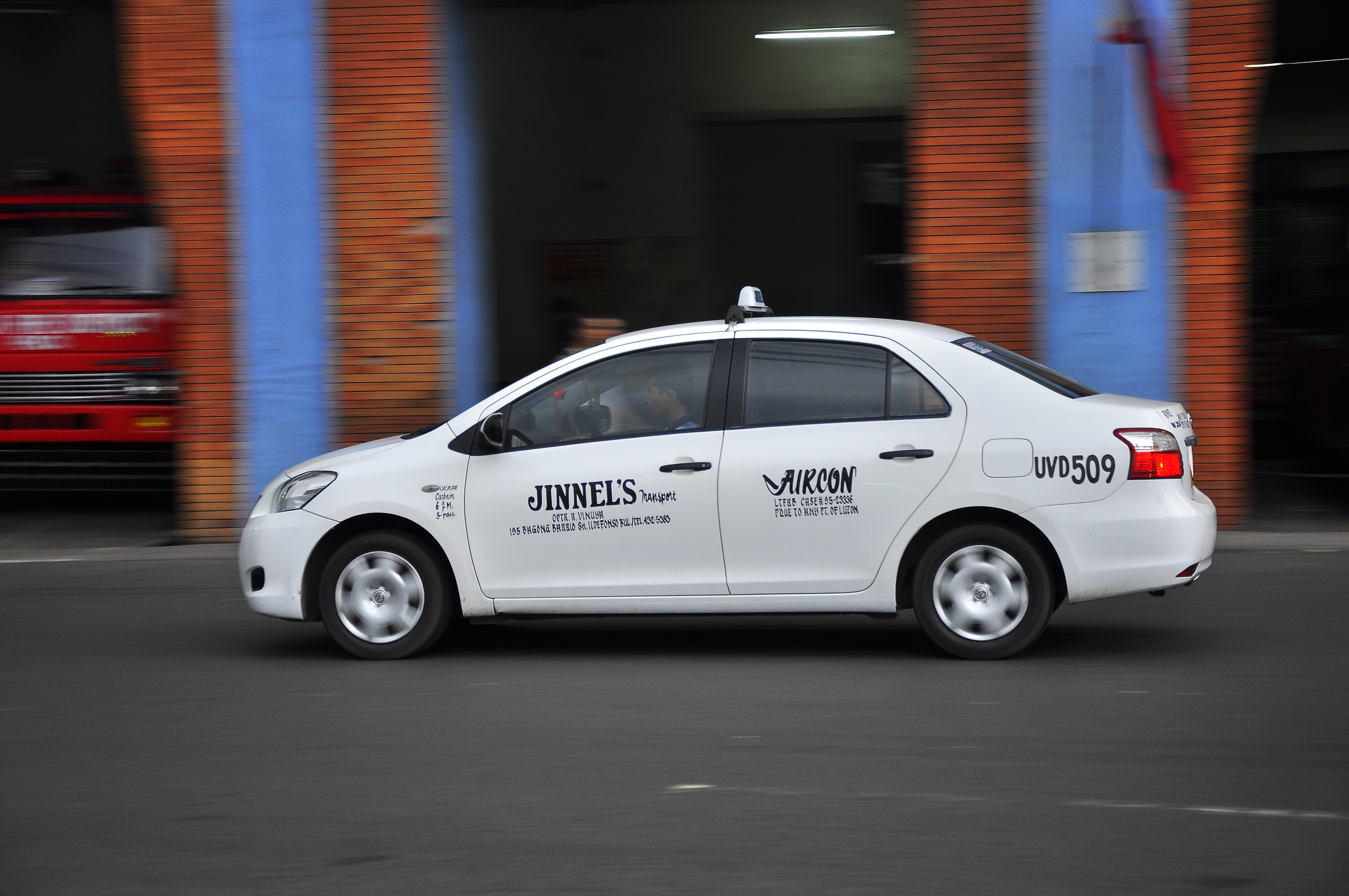
Toyota Vios white taxicab roaming in Metro Manila.

Most taxicabs in the Philippines are white with black text, the exception is for airport taxis which are usually yellow. On the sides of the cab, the taxi service and its operator licensing numbers are listed. On the back of the cab, a question "How's my driving" and a hotline number is posted for complaints against the cab driver and operator.

=== South Korea ===
In South Korea have two types of Taxi, Company Taxi and Personal Taxi. The company Taxi color is Orange but Personal Taxi is gray or white. But recently Taxi color restrictions were lifted.

=== Taiwan ===
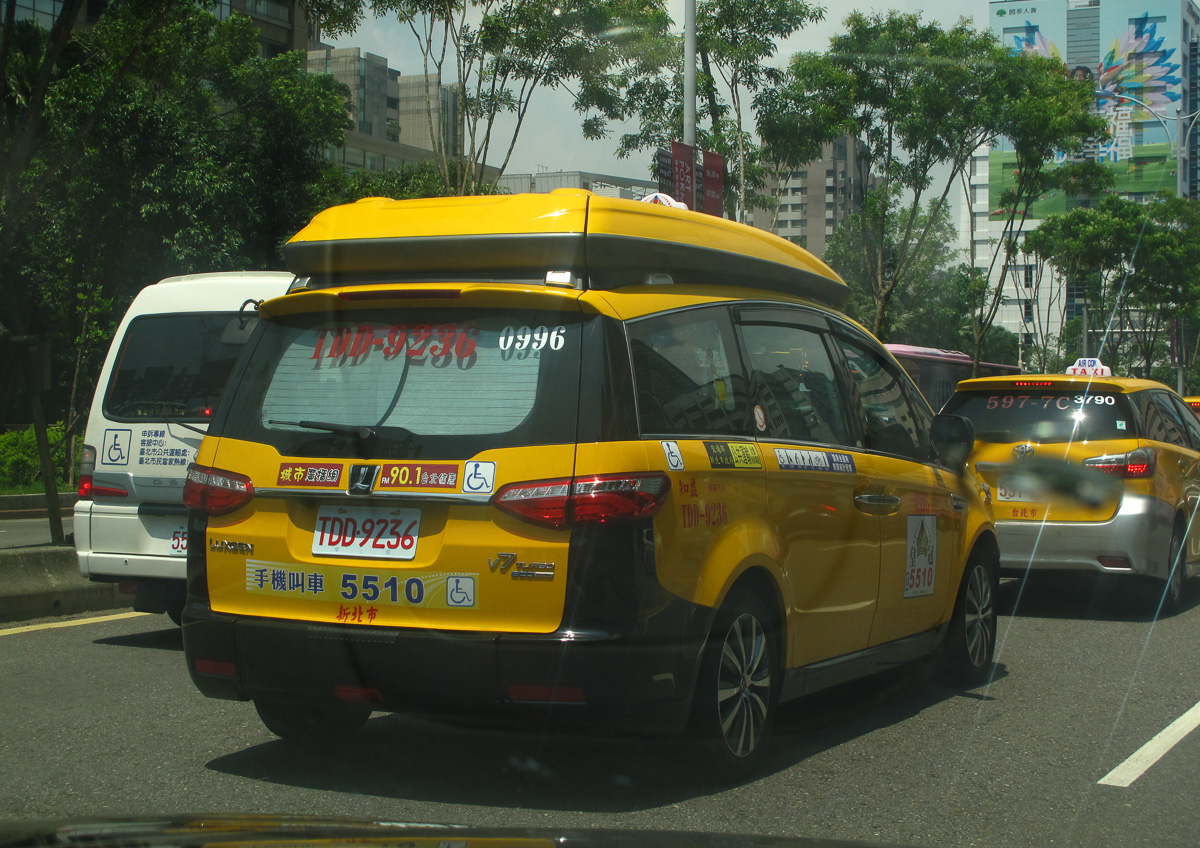
Luxgen V7 taxi in Taiwan

In Taiwan, taxis are painted yellow prior to obtaining registration. The bumper may retain its factory colors by owner preference. The body may bear sponsored advertisements.

== Europe ==
=== Germany ===
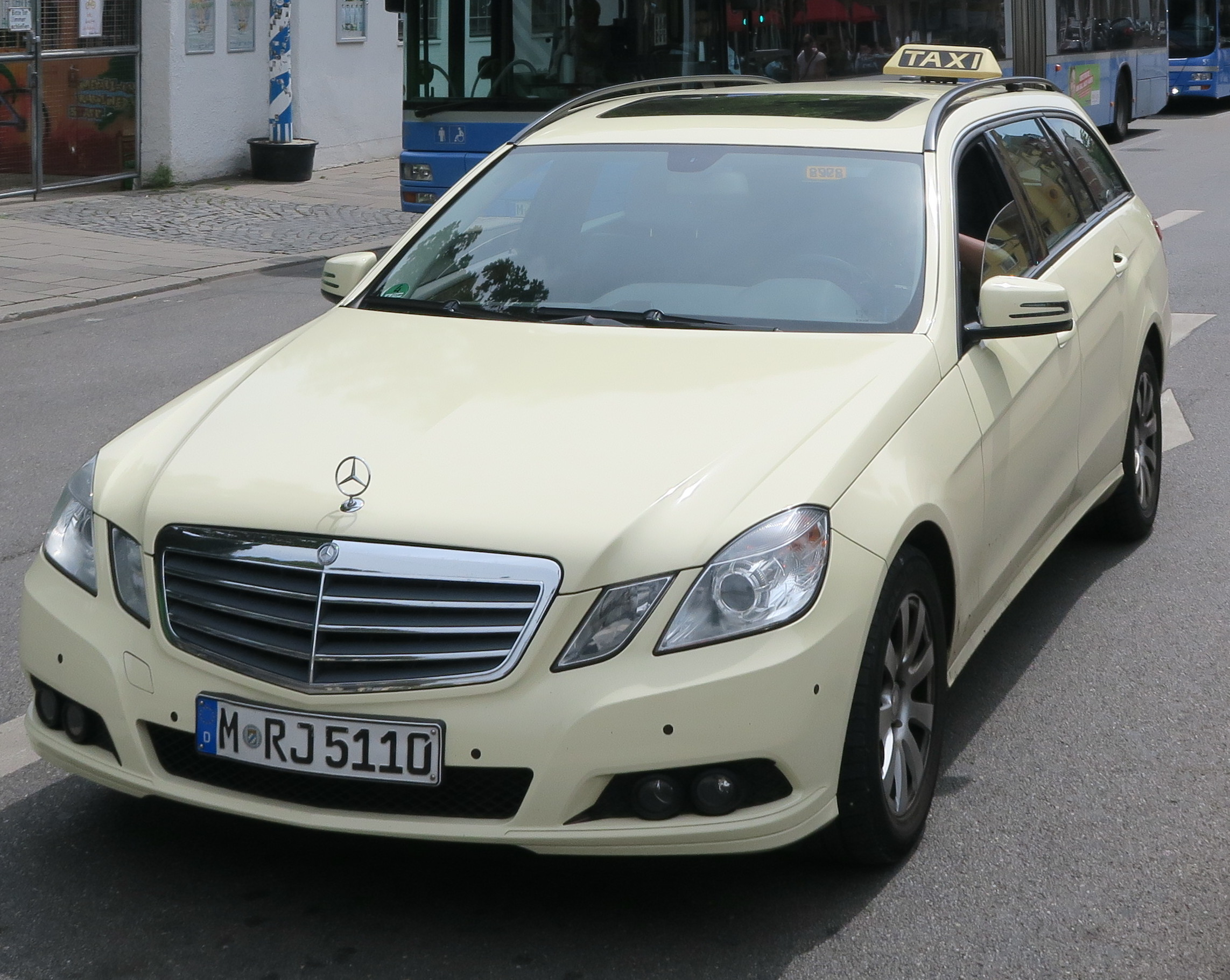
Mercedes-Benz E-Class taxi in Germany

In Germany, taxis are beige, a look that was officially stipulated by law as Elfenbein ("ivory") a light ivory-color in 1971. Before 1971 black was mandatory. Since 2005 change of section 43 enables German states to diverge. By 2016 six states (Baden-Württemberg, Lower Saxony, Rhineland-Palatinate, Saarland, Saxony-Anhalt and Schleswig-Holstein) lifted the mandate, but most taxi drivers' associations and companies still prefer the unified look and visibility of beige.

Most taxis in Germany are Mercedes-Benz limousines, predominantly of the E-Class series.

=== Greece ===
In Greece, taxis have variable colors, according to the city they are registered. For example, in Athens they are yellow (see: [2] 2). In all rural areas, they are usually silver-colored. In other cities except Athens they have particular color, such as blue with white-coloured roofs (Thessaloniki), dark red (Patras) or dark green (Ioannina). Cars used as taxis are mostly 4-door sedans with great luggage space. The cars used most as taxis are Mercedes-Benz C- and E-Classes, VW Passat, Škoda Octavia and Toyota Avensis. Most of them in urban areas are equipped with GPS navigation systems.

=== Ireland ===
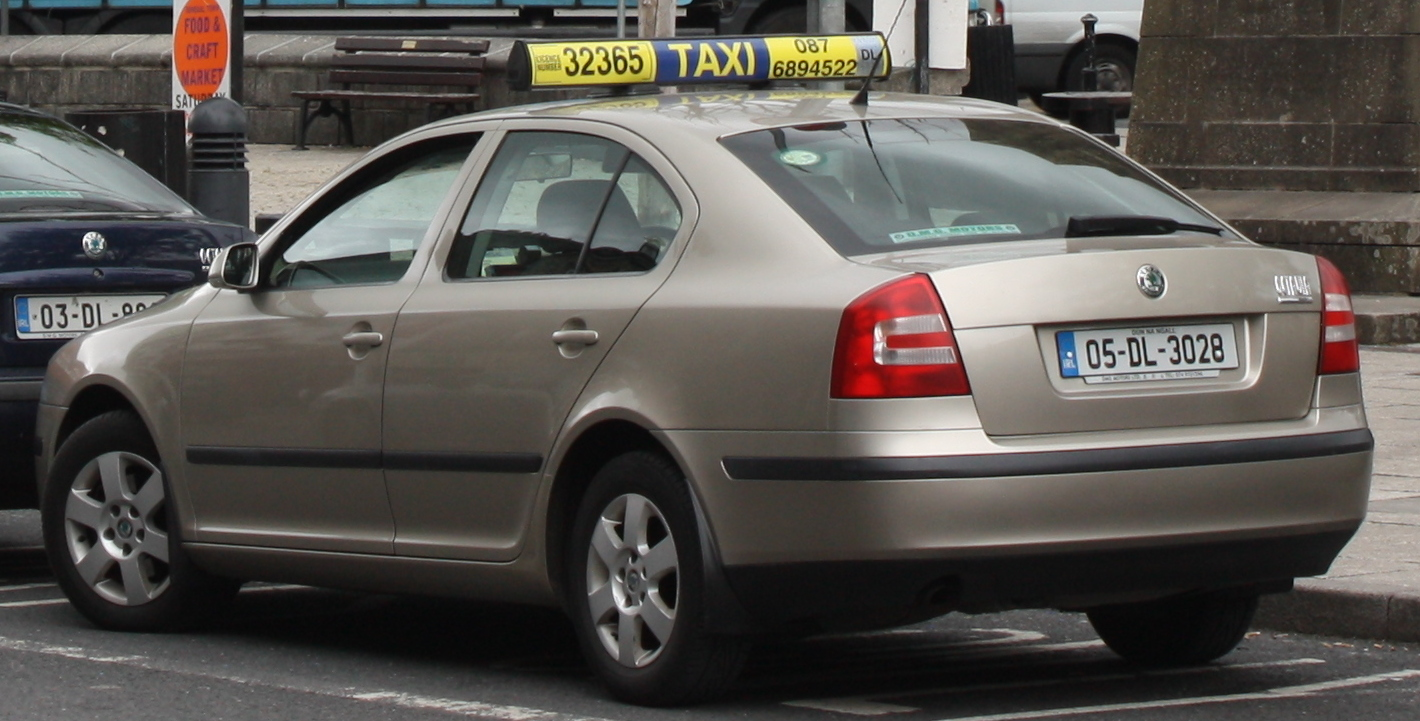
Skoda Octavia taxi in Donegal, Ireland

In Ireland, taxis do not have a specific colour regulation and can be any colour, as long as they have a roof sign with the word "TAXI" or "TACSAÍ" (Irish for "taxi"), the license number, and the county code (D=Dublin, SO=Sligo, G=Galway, W=Waterford). The vehicle also needs to have a green and blue "TAXI" or "TACSAÍ" sign on both front doors in a specific design.

=== Italy ===
In Italy, taxis used to be green and black since the time of World War II, but were eventually changed to a bright yellow color. More recently, the color was changed to white.

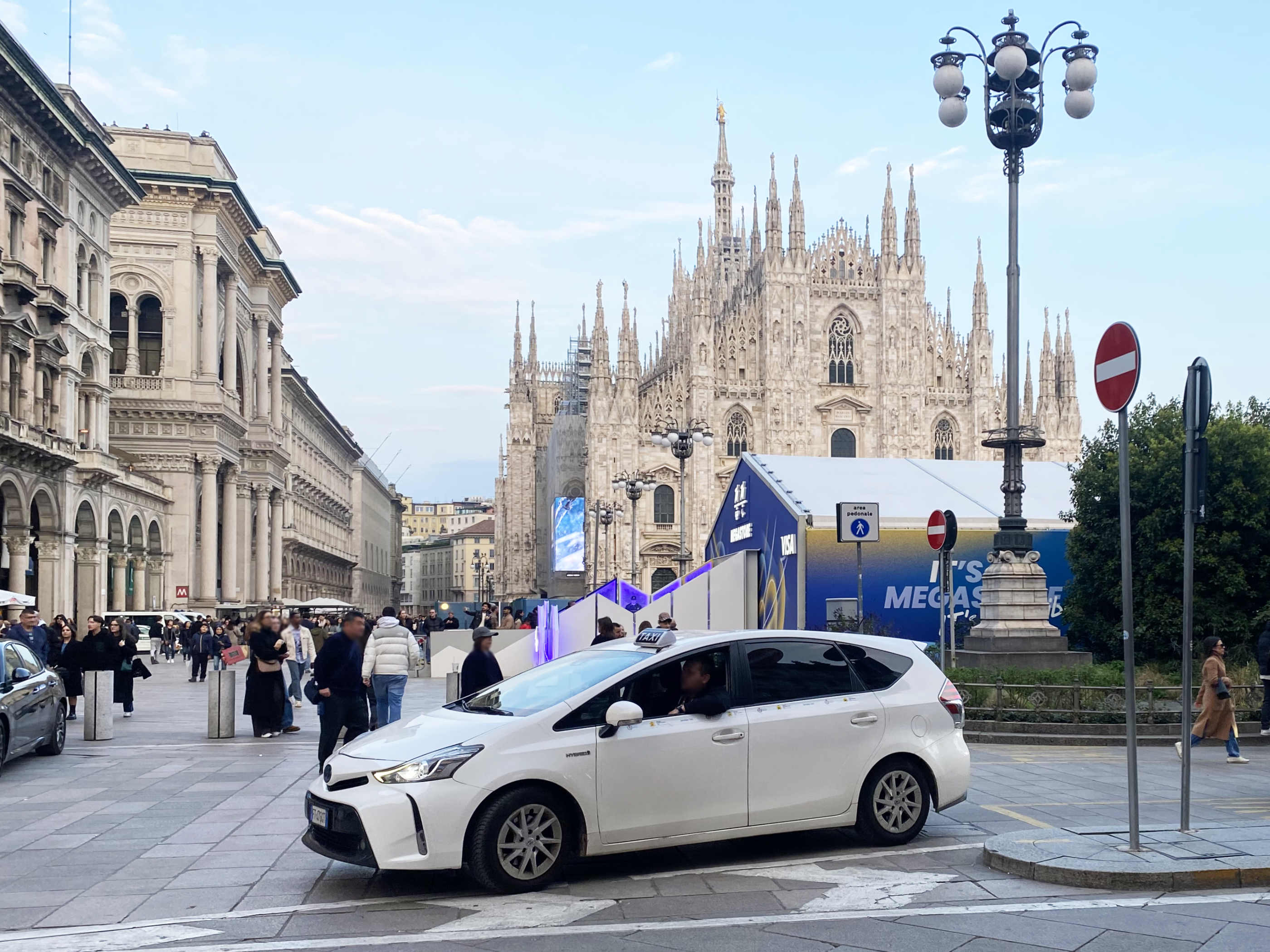
A white taxi (Toyota Prius+) near Milan Cathedral. In Italy, licensed taxis are white by municipal regulation.

=== Netherlands ===
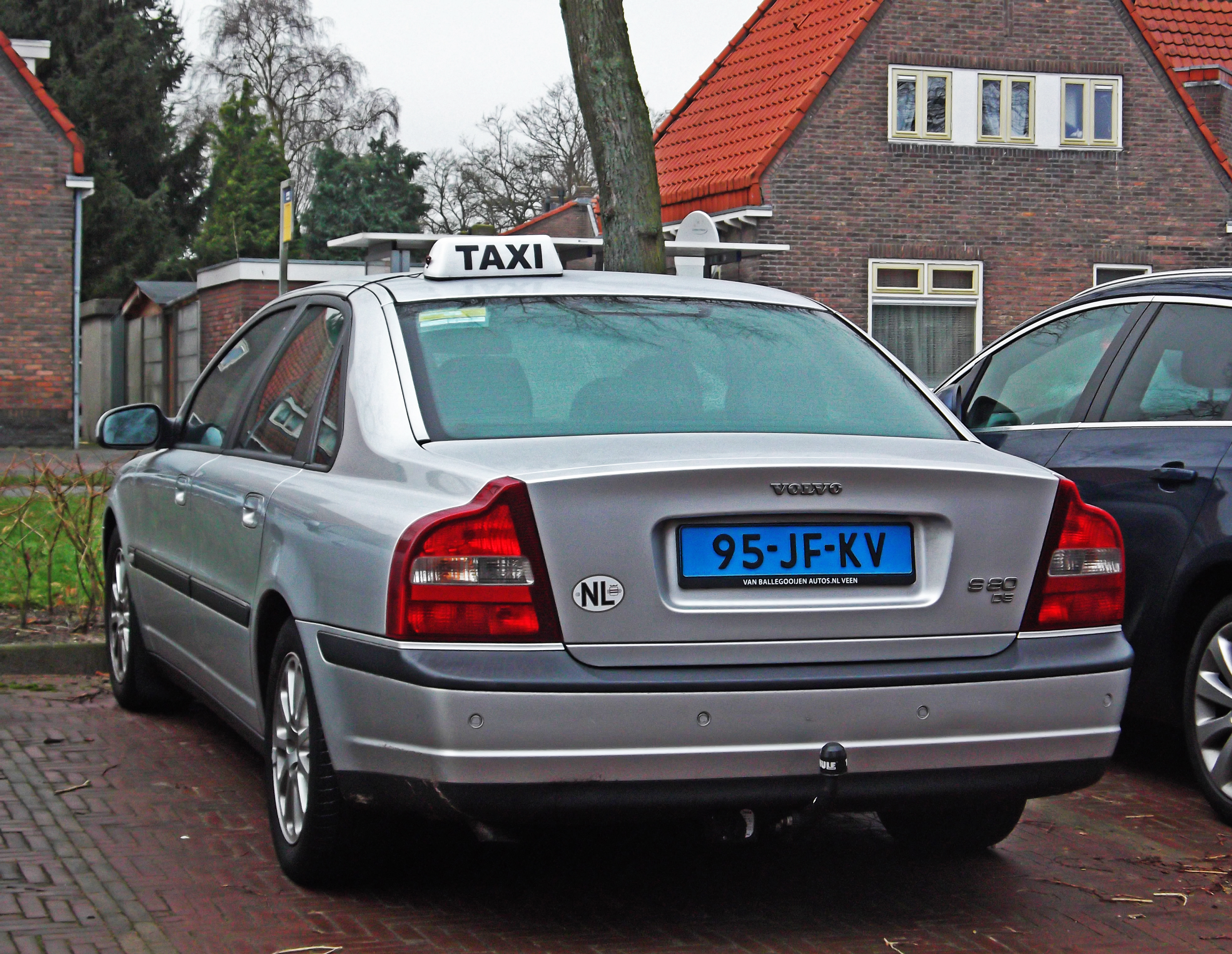
Volvo S80 D5 taxi in the Netherlands

Although not all taxis in the Netherlands carry the usual taxi signs, all vehicles that are in use as regular taxis are required by law to carry light blue licence plates with black lettering.

=== Portugal ===
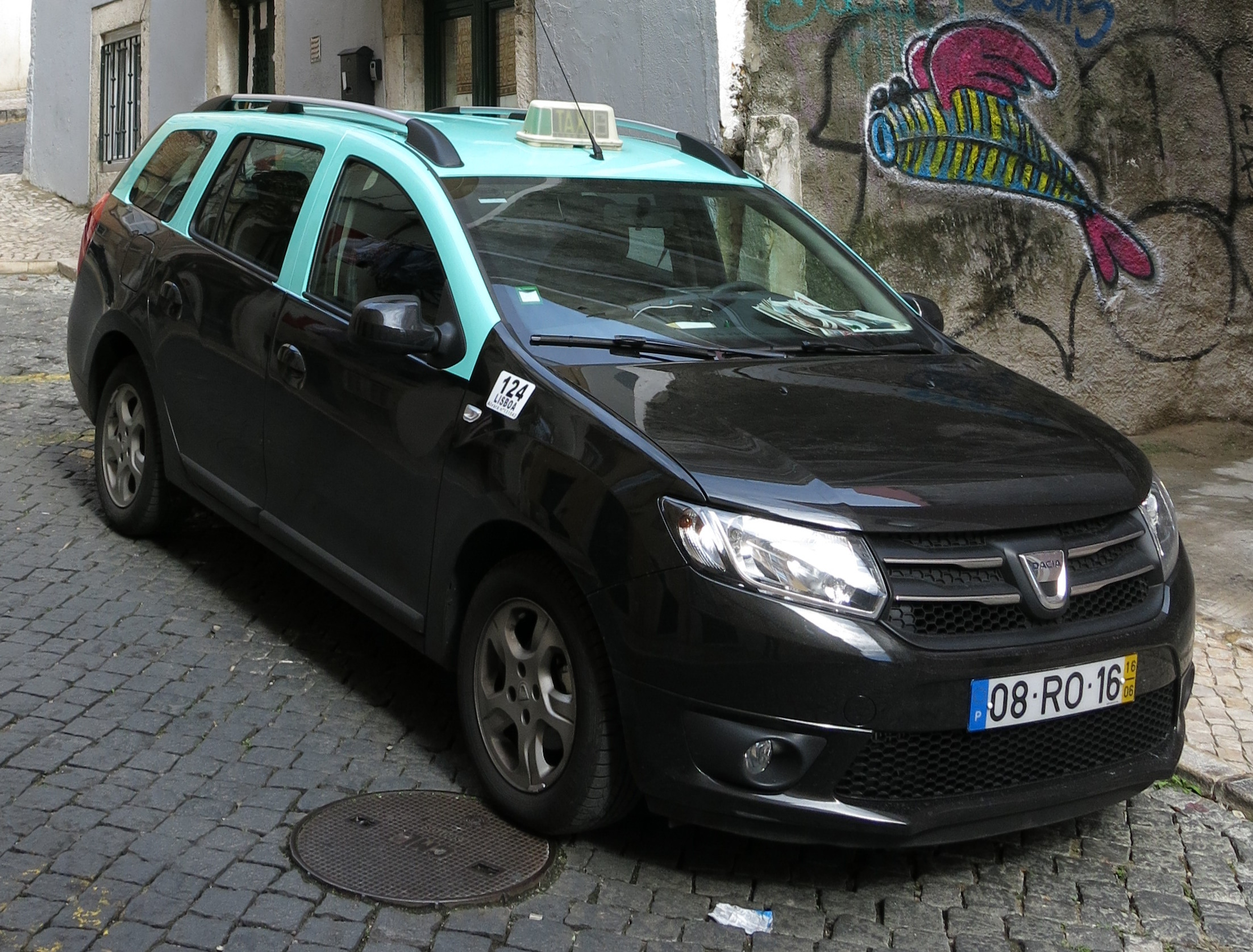
Lisbon taxi

In Portugal, taxis were traditionally black with the upper half painted light green. This was changed to a uniform beige color in the 1990s, but in the 2000s (decade) many new taxis have gone back to the traditional livery. Since 2018, the black and green color scheme came to be again the only allowed livery in continental Portugal.

In Madeira, during the 1980s, the black and green livery of the taxis was replaced by a yellow scheme with a stripe of light-blue in the middle.

In Azores, taxis used to have the same color schemes as in continental Portugal. Nowadays, taxis are white with two diagonal blue lines on the rear doors.

Mercedes C- and E-class are popular taxi models.

=== Russia ===
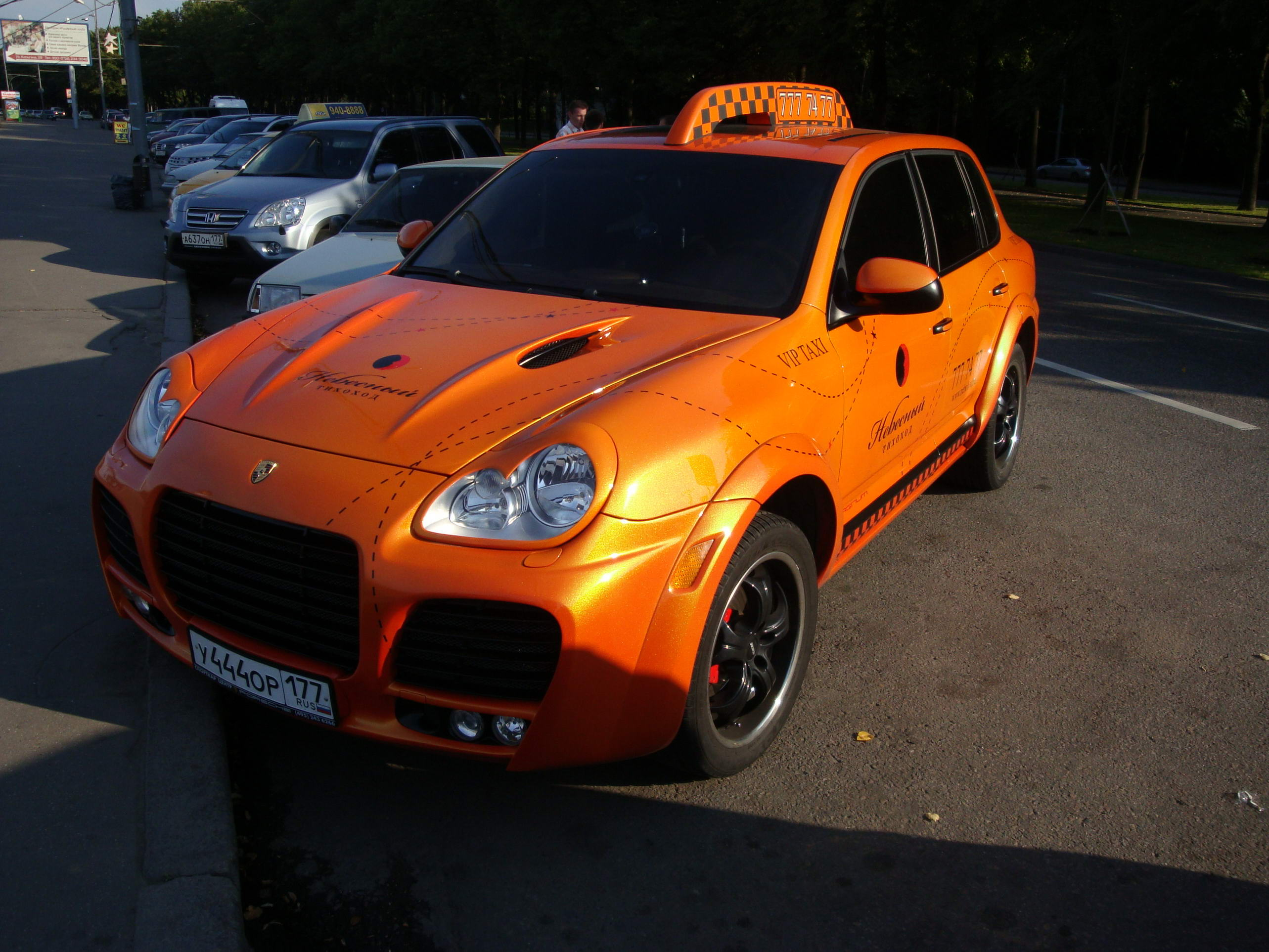
A Russian TechArt Magnum taxi based on the Porsche Cayenne

In Russia some companies are offering a 'luxury' taxi service where taxis are Maybachs and TechArt Magnums (tuned Porsche Cayennes) – but most cabs are operated by more 'conventional' brands, such as Ford Focus or Renault Kangoo in larger cities and Russian makes elsewhere.

=== Slovenia ===
In Slovenia taxis are operated by small private companies. They can be of any color with mandatory taxi sign on the roof. Only in Koper and Sežana the taxis must be white.

=== Serbia ===
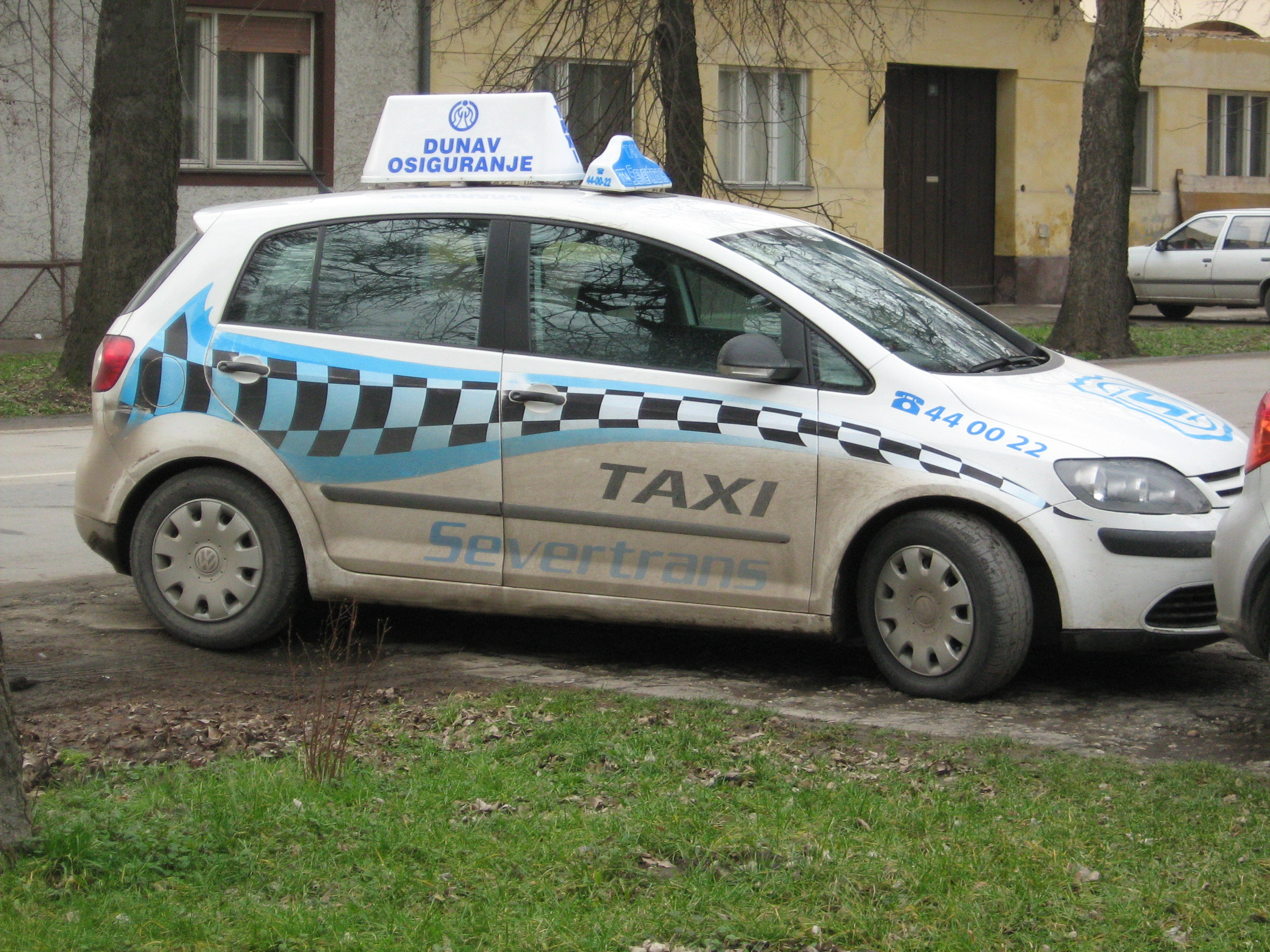
Severtrans taxi from Sombor, Serbia

In Serbia taxis are operated by numerous small private companies. They can be of any color, but they must prominently display the company name and phone number. Since 8th of May 2024, all taxis in Belgrade are mandated to be colored white without any stickers.

=== Spain ===
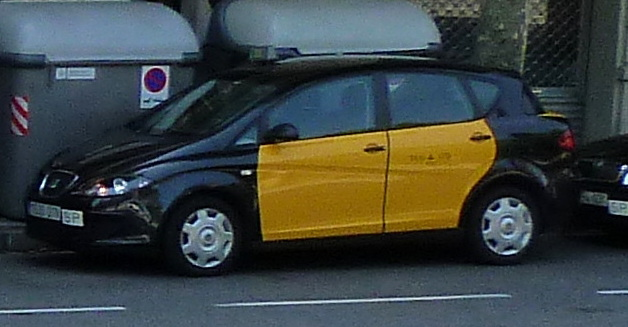
SEAT Altea XL taxi in Barcelona

In Spain, each town and city designates the color of their taxis, but in the overwhelming majority, it is white, usually with some kind of color detail and/or local symbol on the doors. For example, in Madrid (and also in Almería), taxis are white with a red diagonal stripe going through the front doors; in Seville, they are white with a diagonal yellow stripe down the rear doors; in Bilbao, white with a horizontal red stripe on the front doors, etc. A notable exception is Barcelona, where taxis are fully black, except the doors and the boot lid, which are painted yellow.

=== United Kingdom ===
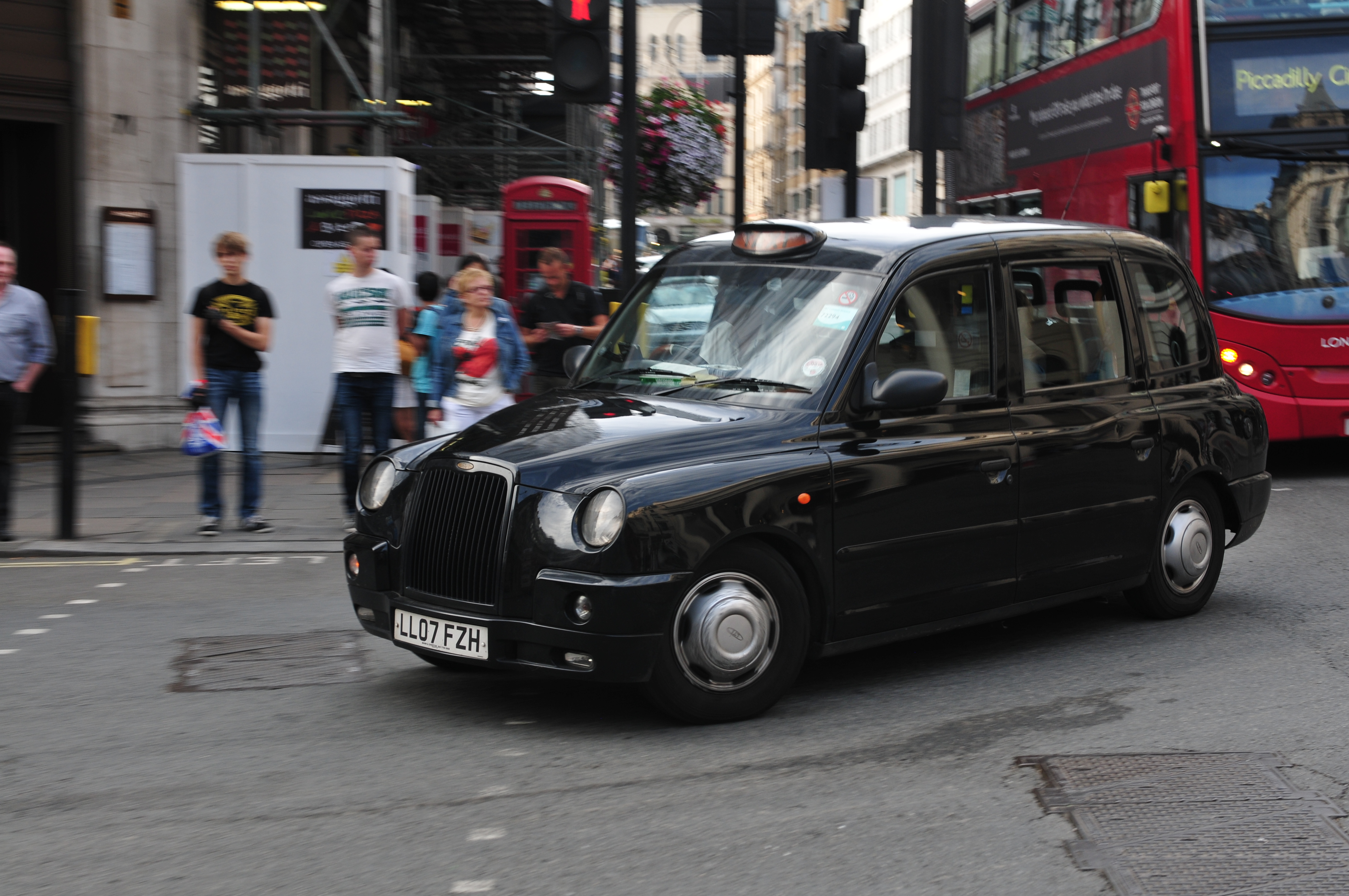
A LTI TX4 in London.

London taxis are traditionally black, with the term "black cab" meaning a licensed taxi with a meter. Only approved vehicle models that meet certain conditions for passenger headroom and turning circle radius can be used as taxis, such as the LEVC TX and Mercedes Vito. There is no actual livery requirement for London taxis although most are painted black.

Outside London, taxi licensing is the responsibility of the local authority. Most major cities predominantly use London taxis, again traditionally black but this is not always mandatory. Smaller towns and rural areas allow more varieties of passenger cars, which may require taxis to be painted in a particular livery as a licence condition. Many towns use two-colour schemes, such as white vehicles with another specific colour on the bonnet and boot. This colour may have significance to the town, such as taxis in Brighton which use white with an aquamarine colour in keeping with the scheme used on the seafront railings and more widely in the city. Windsor, home to the Queen's residence at Windsor Castle, uses white with royal purple on the bonnet and boot. Basildon taxis display white with orange bonnet and boot, Leeds white with black, Cardiff black with white, and West Suffolk and Middlesbrough black with yellow. Bradford are all white with a green diagonal stripe on the front side doors. St Albans are all white with a yellow stripe running the full length of the side, and in Bournemouth they are pale yellow with a white stripe. Single colour schemes include blue in Bristol, teal in Guildford, and silver in Portsmouth, whilst white is used widely including in Southampton, Sunderland and Scarborough. In Hartlepool and Derby taxis are yellow, but both local authorities considered changing the livery in 2019 to reduce costs whilst still allowing taxis to be easily identified. Hartlepool proposed a two-colour scheme with a standard manufacturer colour such as white, silver or black as a base, and retain yellow only on the bonnet and boot, but abandoned plans after a consultation. Derby plans to change to black with a yellow diagonal strip on each side.

In another sense of livery, the Worshipful Company of Hackney Carriage Drivers became a City of London livery company in 2004.

== North America ==
=== Caribbean ===
Three-wheeled Coco taxis, named because their shape resembles that of a coconut, are used in Havana, Cuba.

In Trinidad and Tobago, Maxi taxis that are colour-coded to a specific area, taxis are not colour-coded.

=== Central America ===
Costa Rican taxis are colored red. Usual cars for taxi use are Hyundai Accents, Toyota Coraxi (a cab version of the Toyota Corolla) and the Nissan Sentra (B13).

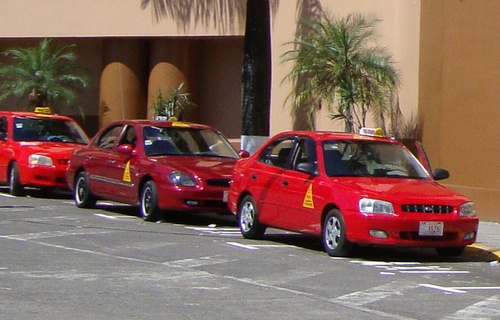
Taxis in Costa Rica

=== U.S. and Canada ===
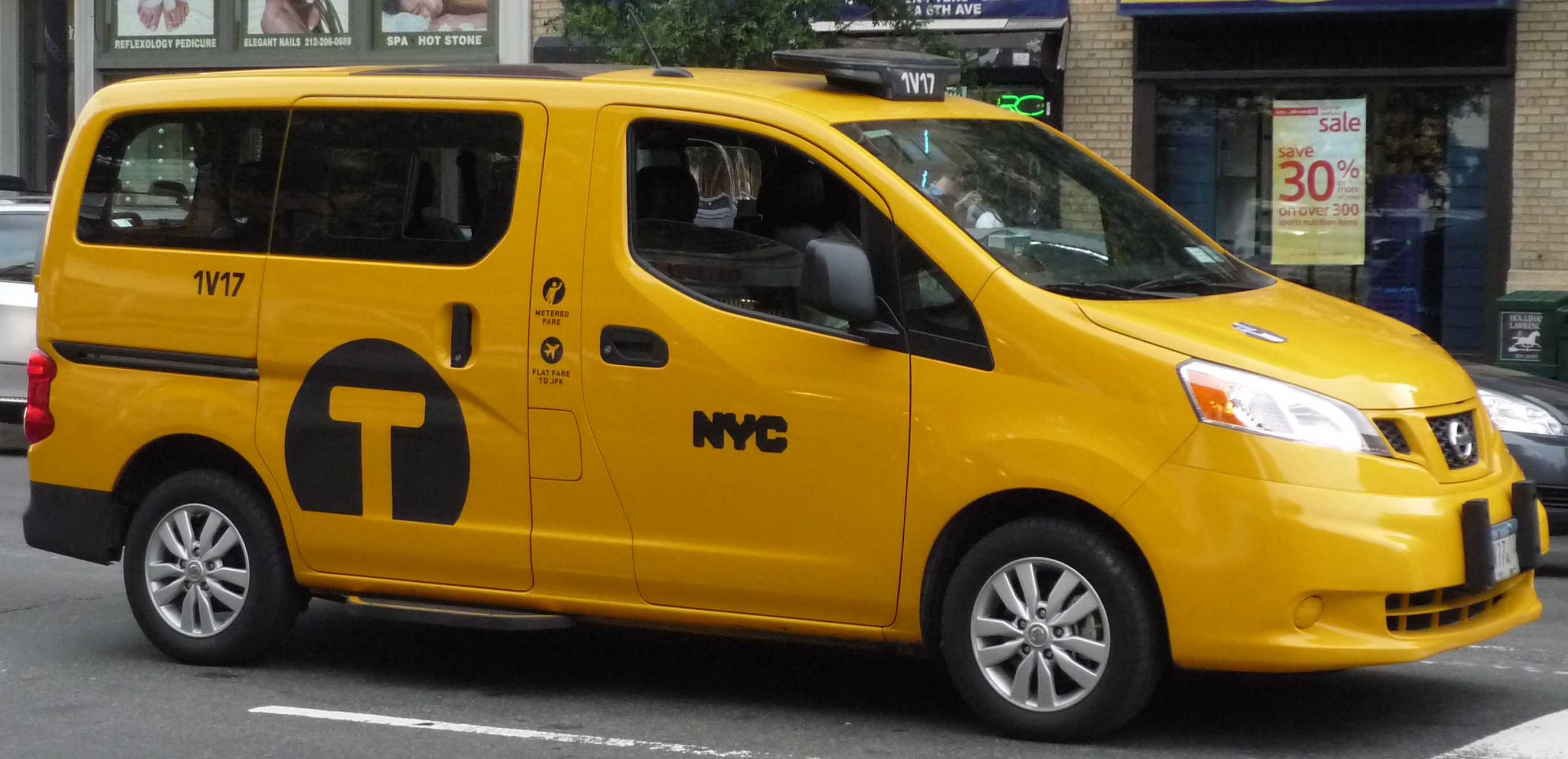
New York Nissan NV200 taxi

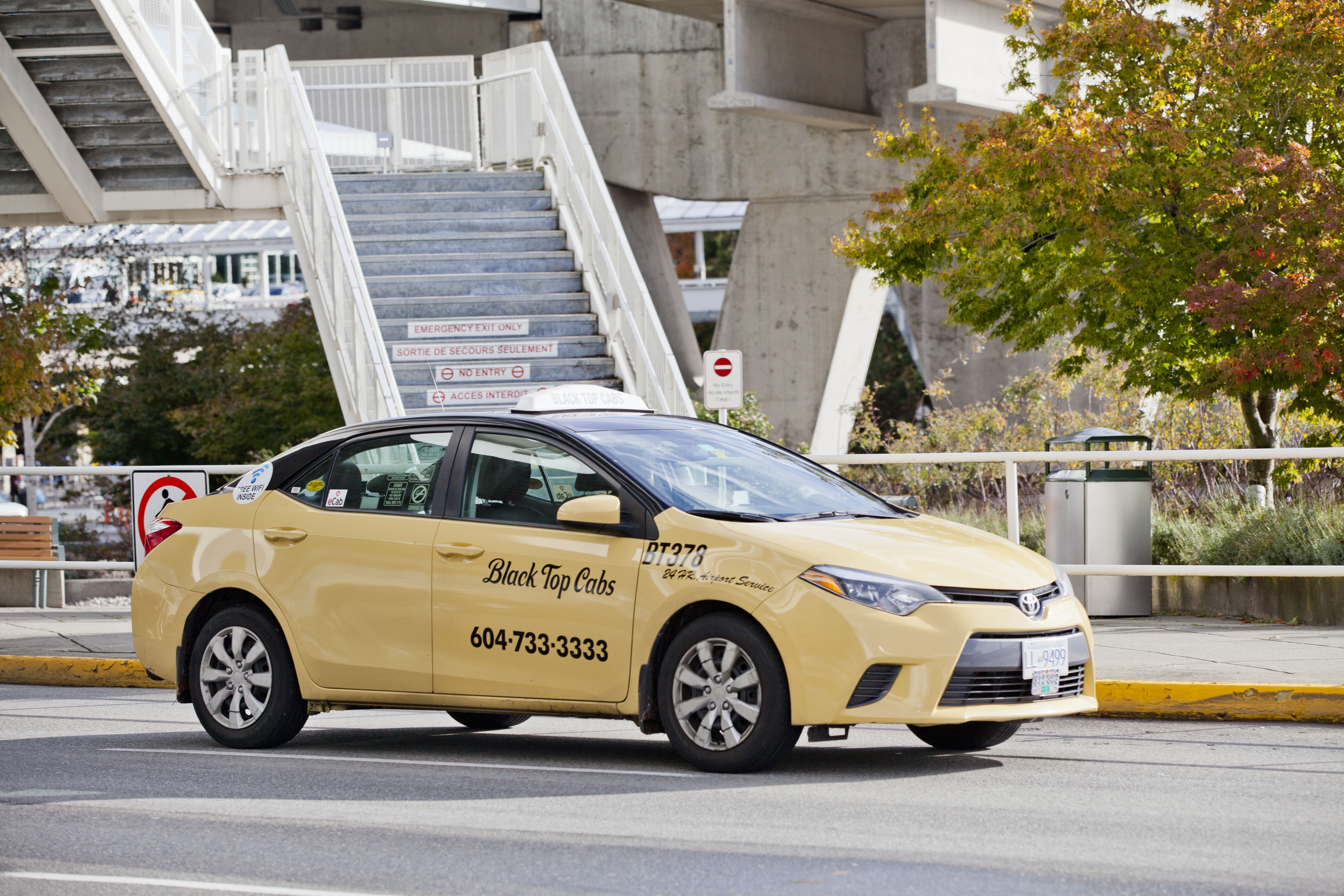
Vancouver Toyota Corolla taxi

In the United States and Canada, many older taxi companies are named according to their paint schemes. Thus, "yellow cabs" are painted yellow, checker taxis are a play on the car manufacturer's name (Checker Motors) and have a distinctive black-and-white or black-and-yellow checkerboard stripe around their bodies, "Blue and White Cabs" might have blue bodies and white roofs, and "Black Top" and "Red Top Cabs" have black and red roofs respectively. In the 1920s, a famous company named "Brown and White" lost a lawsuit to prevent other taxi drivers from painting their cars these colors.

Some Canadian cities such as Toronto and Vancouver have taxis with their own custom color, but Montreal-area taxis (mostly mid-size cars such as the Chevrolet Malibu and Toyota Camry) remain stock.

In the late 1960s, New York City ordered that the city's taxis be painted yellow. This sometimes led to confusion for New York visitors to Toronto, where police cars had yellow livery from the 1960s until they were phased out starting in 1986. Most Toronto cabs had two-tone livery.

In Honolulu, Hawaii, most taxis are luxury cars such as Lincoln Town Cars and Lexus ES350s and GX470s. These cars are left stock colored.

=== Mexico ===
Mexico City's ubiquitous VW Type 1 (Beetle) cabs were green and white (a change from earlier yellow) by law until early 2003. However, the tiny cars had been displaced by bigger four-door sedans, the Nissan Tsuru, a Sentra MkIII (B13) based saloon and recognized for their red/white (or silver) body color. No VW are colored this way anymore. Matchbox released a scale model of the VW taxi in 2004, numbered 31. It is common that every six years, when Mexico city elections are concluded, the recently elected mayor changes the livery of the public transportation.

== Oceania ==
=== Australia ===
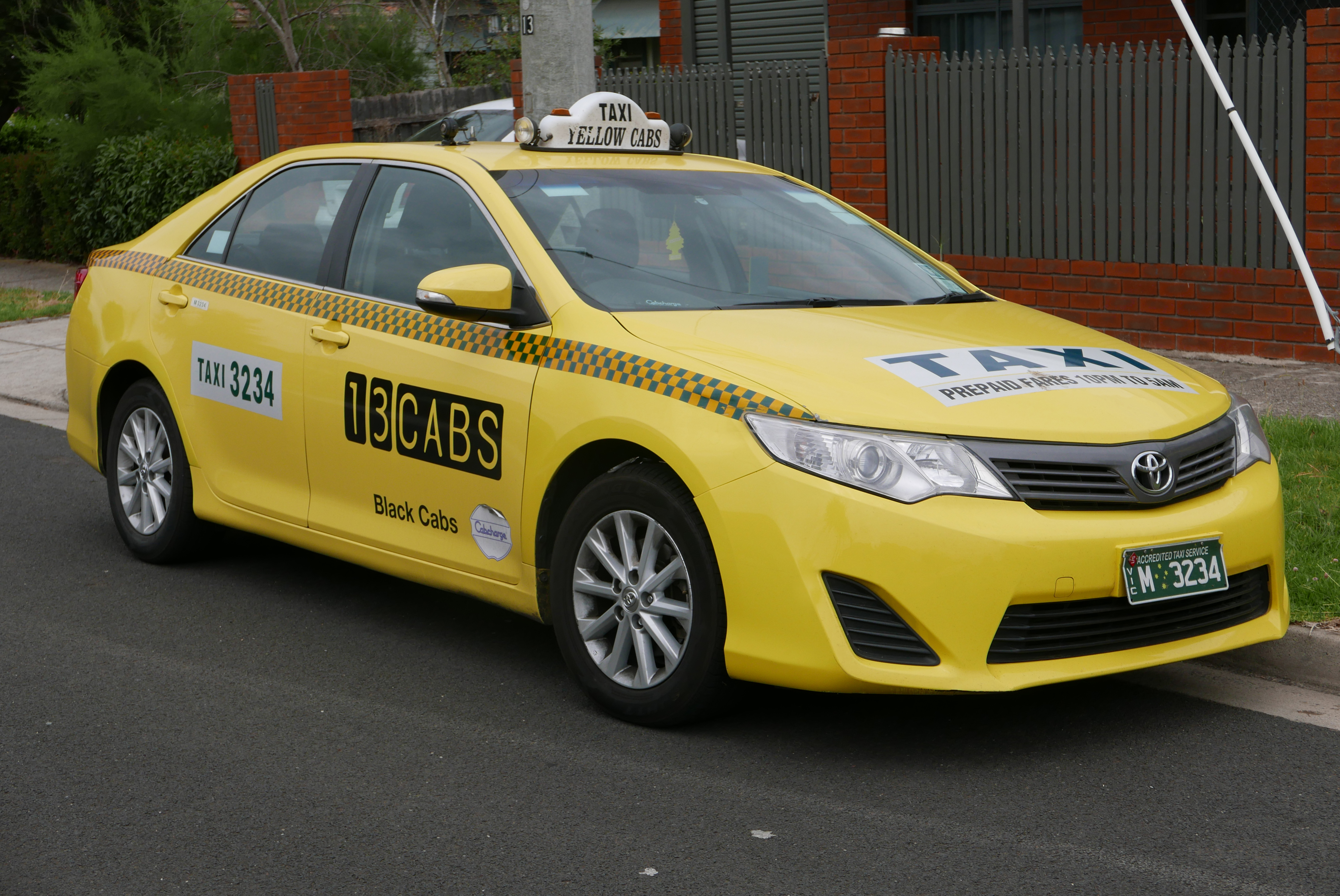
Taxicabs in Melbourne Australia

In Australia, livery is determined by state legislation. In Victoria, an all-yellow scheme is adopted. In contrast, in Queensland and New South Wales livery is dependent on which company is operating the dispatch system the taxi uses. In South Australia, most taxis are white. In the Australian Capital Territory All taxis are white while only recently (early 2011) upon request by some operators, the two main operators are moving from rear window and the old boot-lid mounted advertising to body-wrap advertising while both corporate and limousine services have silver livery on their cars.

== South America ==
=== Argentina ===
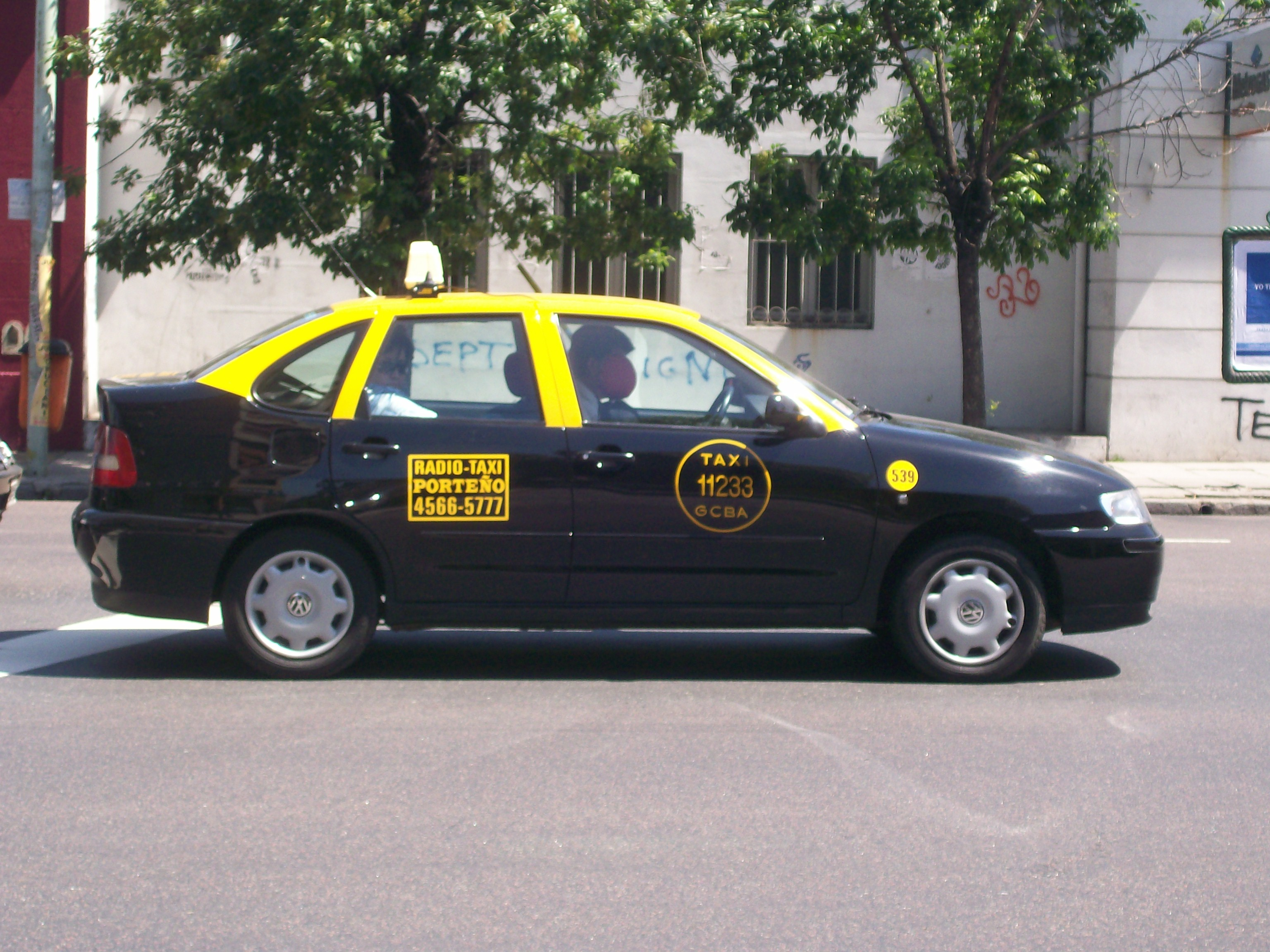
Taxi in Buenos Aires, Argentina

In Argentina, each city designates the color of their taxis. The most common combination in major cities is yellow and black in different proportions (Buenos Aires, Rosario, Mendoza, Mar del Plata, Río Cuarto, Córdoba, San Salvador de Jujuy, among others), but throughout the country, white is predominant, sometimes combined with other colors (cities like La Plata, Berazategui, San Juan, Bariloche, Villa Mercedes).

Taxis in Salta are red (or dark red) with a black stripe. In Quilmes, they are silver-colored (occasionally gray or even dark gray).

There are many cities that don't have a defined livery. These taxis can be identified by their roof sign and can be found in cities like Ushuaia, Formosa, Corrientes or Catamarca.

=== Brazil ===
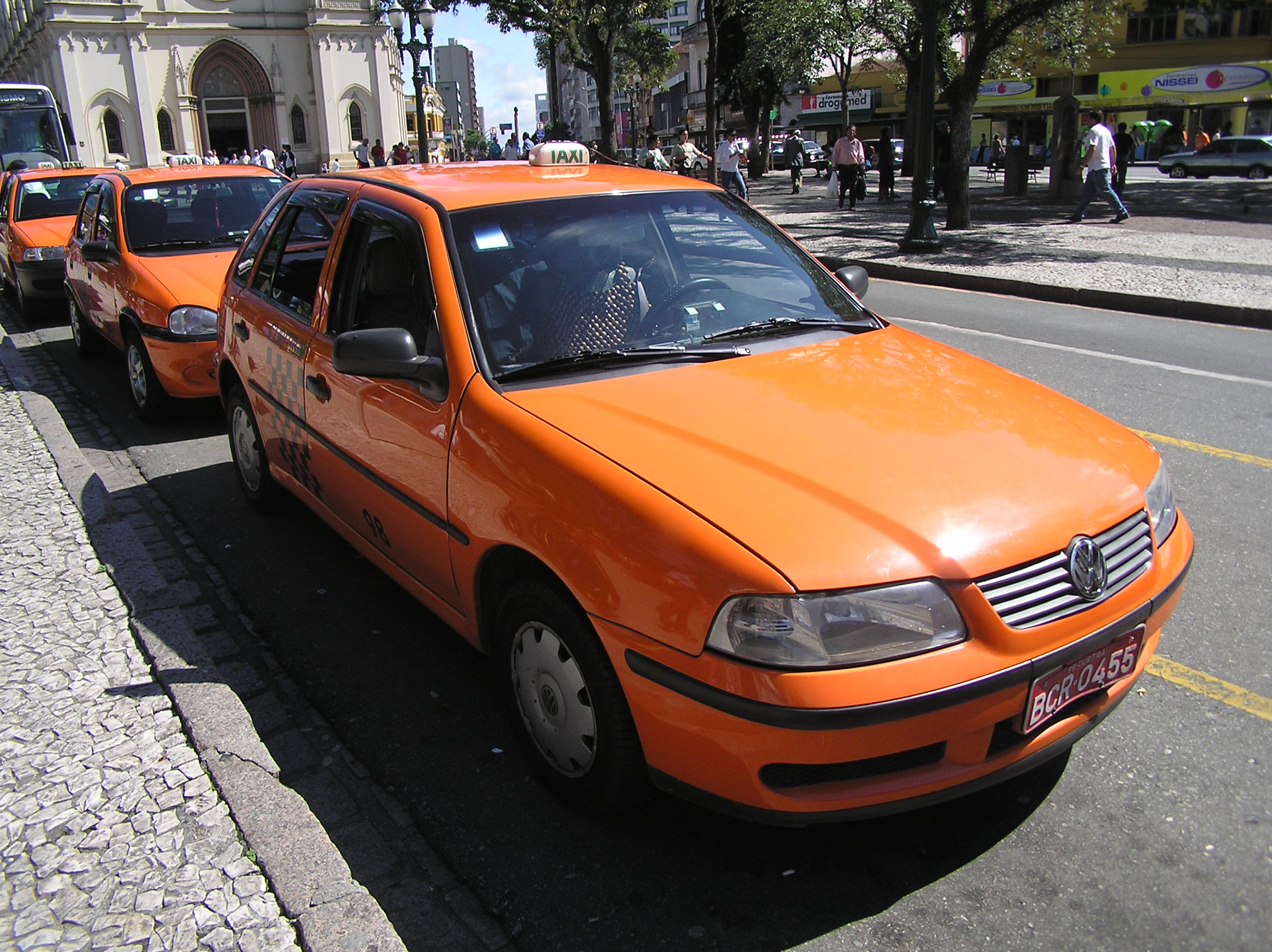
Curitiba taxi

Brazilian taxis are colored red in Porto Alegre and Londrina, orange in Curitiba, yellow in Rio de Janeiro and white in São Paulo, as each city defines its own regulation.

=== Chile ===
In Chile, taxi liveries are somewhat standardized by law and separated by category. Basic taxis are colored black (bearing the licence plate number on both front doors) and yellow roofs. So-called "Executive Taxis" may be red, silver or white liveried but must wear an orange licence plate with black letters and numbers. "Tourism Taxis" are dark blue livered with orange licence plates with white letters and numbers. Shared taxicabs called "Taxi Colectivos" are generally black livered, bearing their service number on the roof and their licence plate numbers painted in yellow on both front doors. Rural taxi-colectivos are yellow liveried bearing their service number on the roof and their licence plate numbers painted in black on both front doors.
