= TechArt =

German automobile tuner

TECHART Automobildesign GmbH
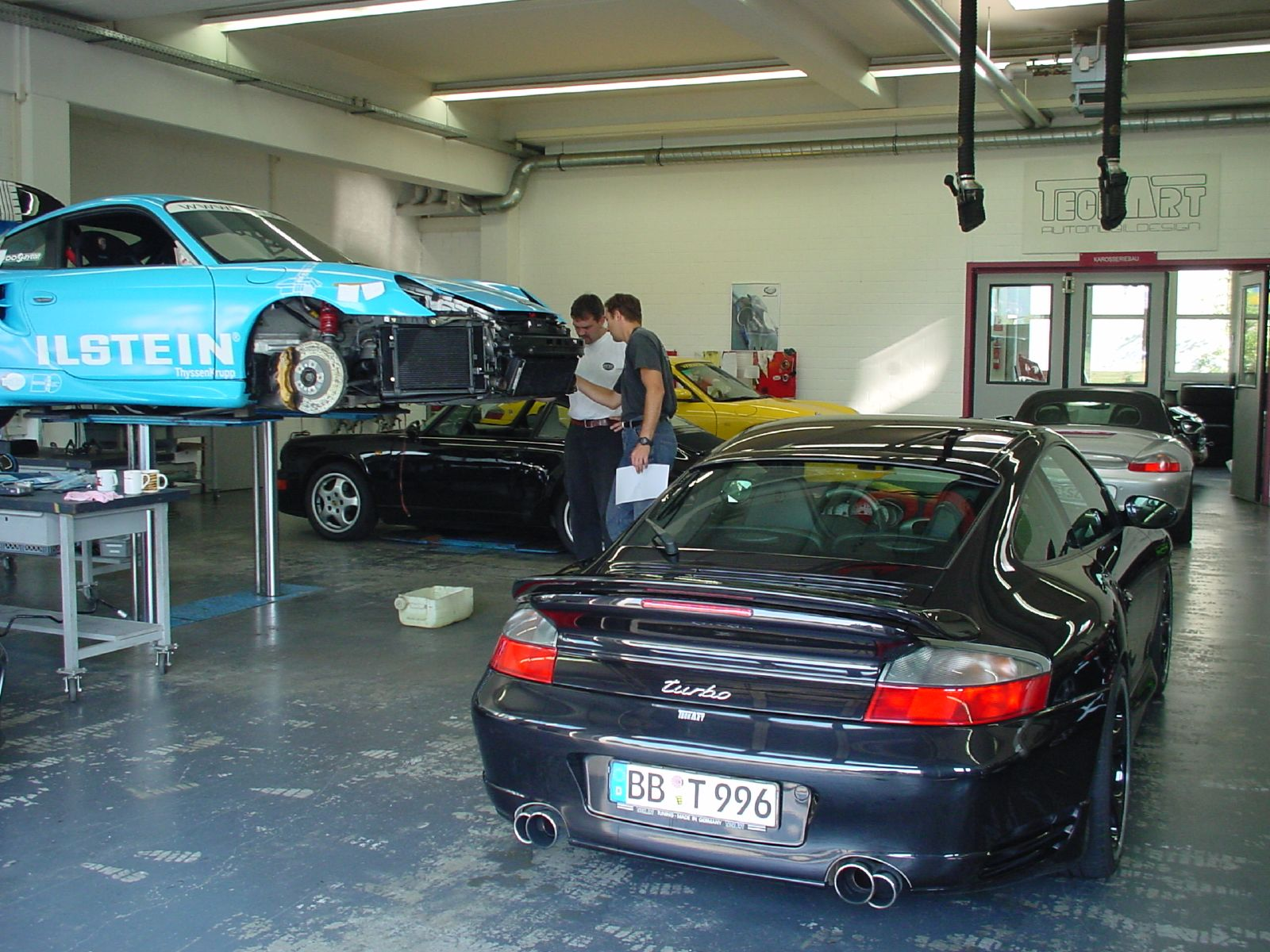
- TECHART work shop
- Type: Private
- Industry: Automotive
- Founded: 1987
- Headquarters: Leonberg, Germany
- Key people: Christ-Johann Collenberg, Marcel Wiedwuilt (CEO)
- Products: Automobile tuning for Porsches
- Website: www.techart.de

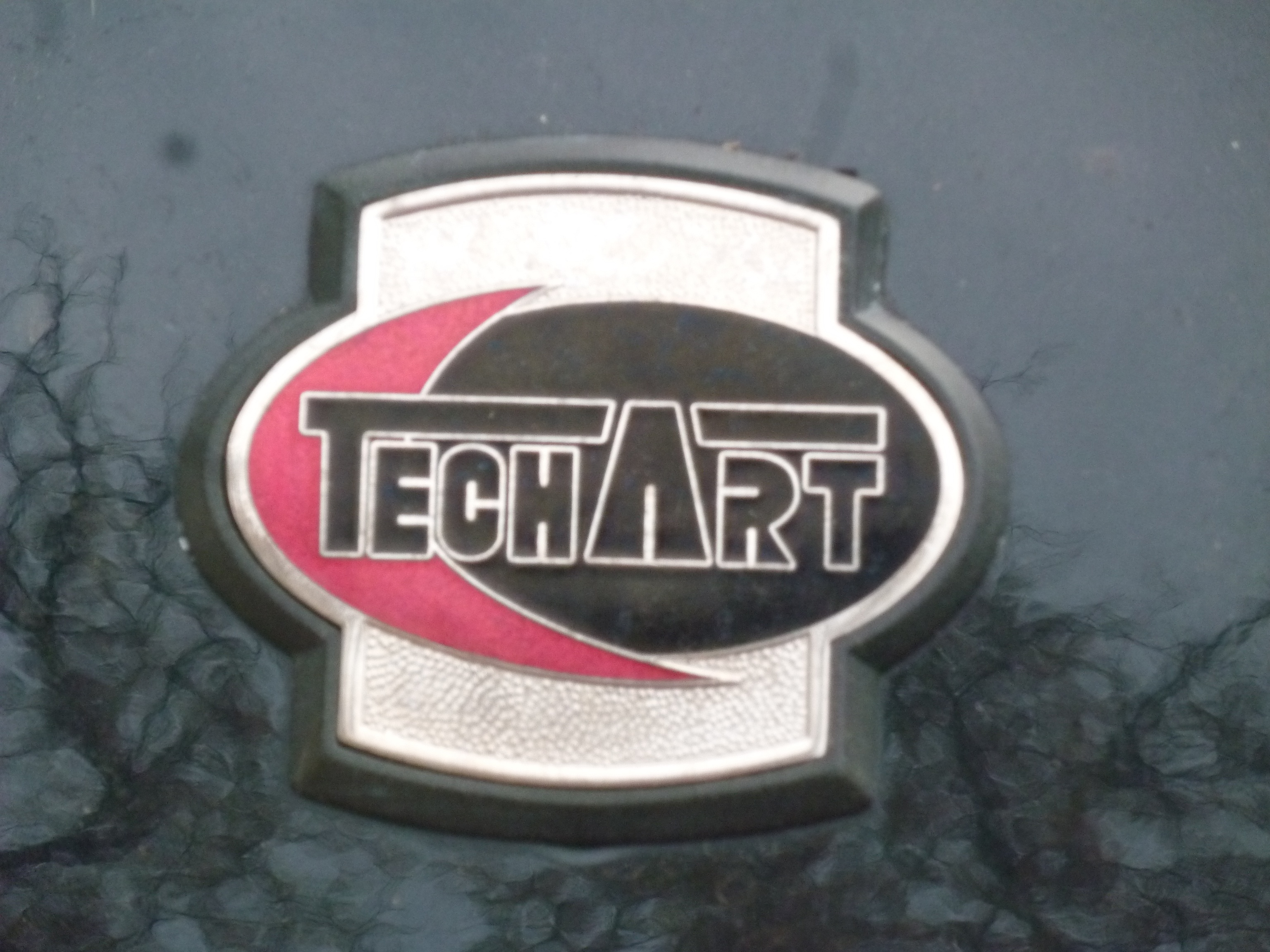
Former TechArt logo

TECHART Automobildesign GmbH is a German automobile tuner specialized in existing Porsches, for which they offer extensive tuning packages. The company was founded in 1987 by Thomas Behringer, Reinhold Mattes and Matthias Kraus in Fellbach and a year later the headquarters were moved to Leonberg, Germany. Through the 1990s, Techart continued modifying Porches.

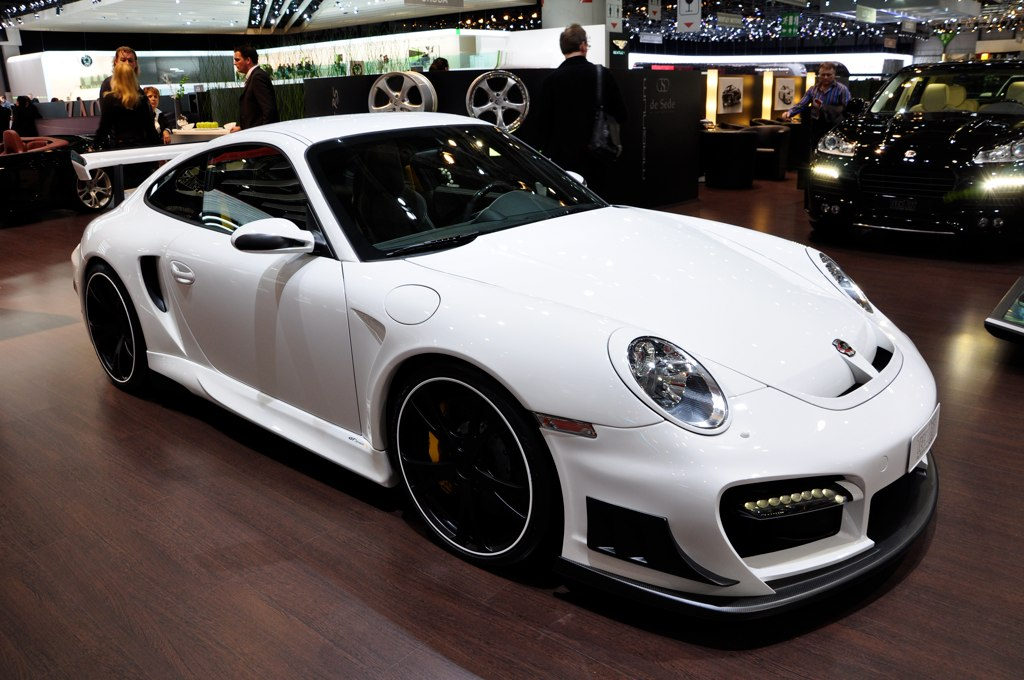
TECHART 997 GTStreet RS

On May 10, 2008, the TechArt GT Street RS (based on a Porsche 997 GT2), driven by Jörg Hardt, ran the fastest time at the annual Tuner Grand Prix, beating out Porsche tuner Cargraphic, which had won the past three consecutive years. While not official, it is widely accepted that the winner of the Tuner GP is Europe's best tuner. In late 2009, the Techart GTstreet RS, based on the Porsche 911 GT2 (997), completed the 3,671 meters of the Sachsenring in 1:31.94 min. Until 2015, no other Porsche was faster in Auto Bild Sportscar's ranking.

Their American division is called TECHART North America Santa Ana, California.

== Notable models ==
- TechArt Magnum
- TechArt 996 GTstreet Coupe
- TechArt 997 Carrera
- TechArt 997 Turbo
- TechArt GTsport
- TechArt GrandGT

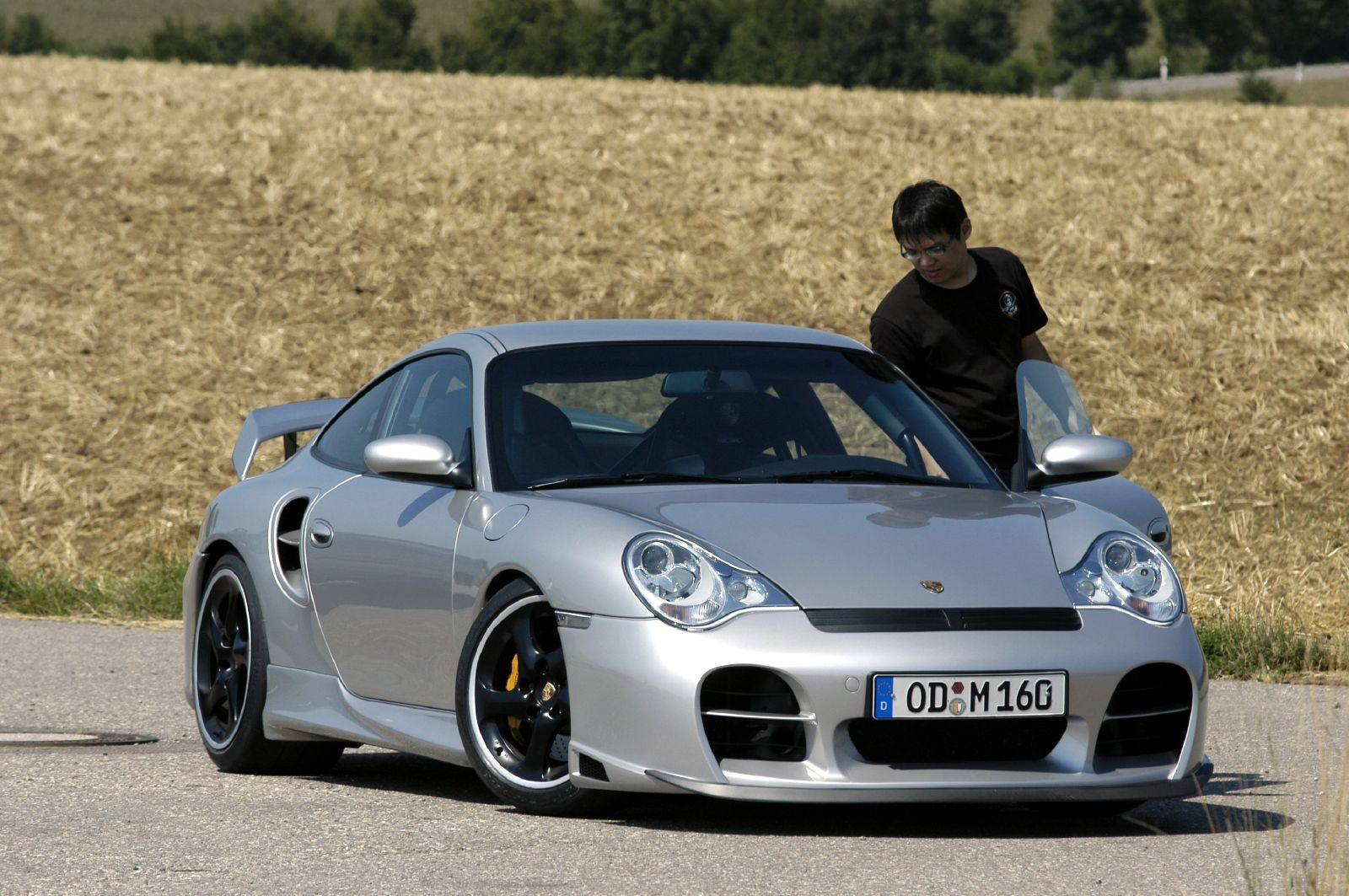
The TECHART 996 GTstreet Coupe

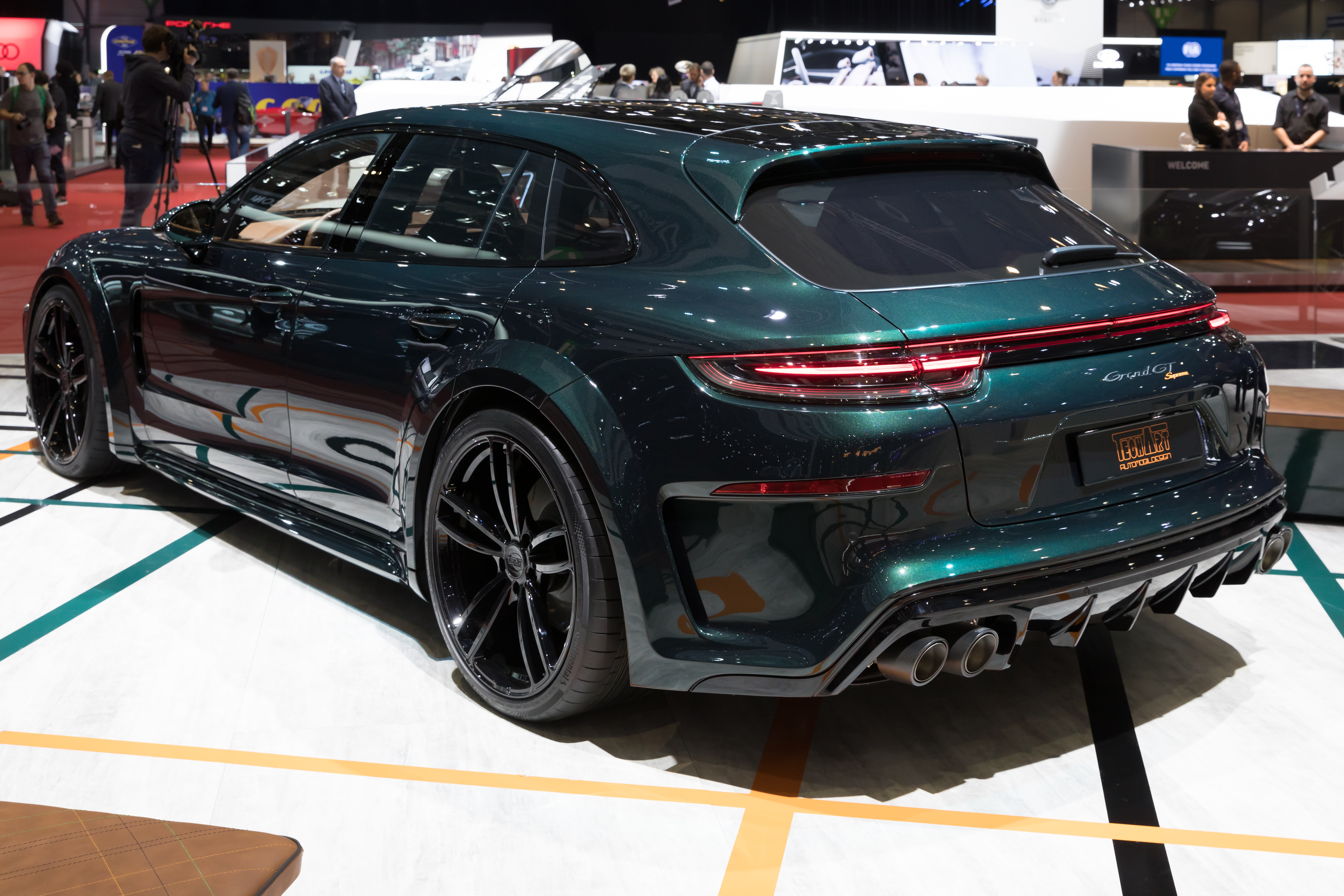
TECHART GrandGT (based on Porsche Panamera Sport Tourismo)
