= TechArt GTsport =

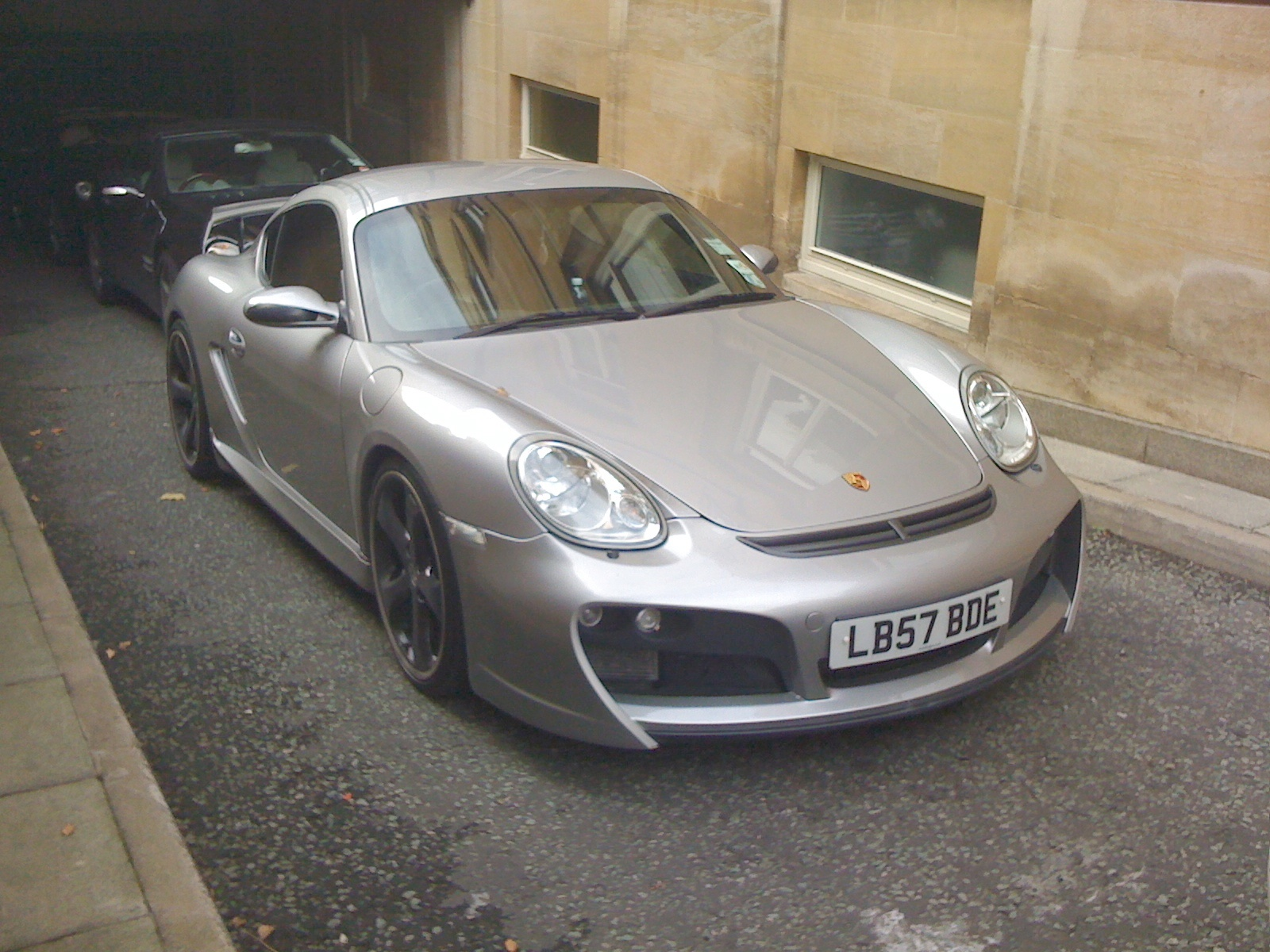

Overview
- Manufacturer: TechArt (modified Porsche)
- Production: 2006-present

Body and chassis
- Class: Sports car
- Body style: 2-door coupe
- Layout: Mid-engine, RWD w/ LSD
- Related: Porsche Cayman S

Powertrain
- Engine: 3.6L (233.4 cu in) Flat-6
- Transmission: 6-speed manual w/ TechArt short shifter

Dimensions
- Wheelbase: 95.1"
- Length: 170.9"
- Width: 70.9"
- Height: 51.4"
- Curb weight: 3,120 pounds (1,415 kg)

The TechArt GTsport is a high-performance sports car based on the Porsche Cayman S. TechArt produces the GTsport in limited quantities with added performance and aesthetic features including engine and suspension performance pieces, bodykit, and interior upgrades.

== Design and features ==
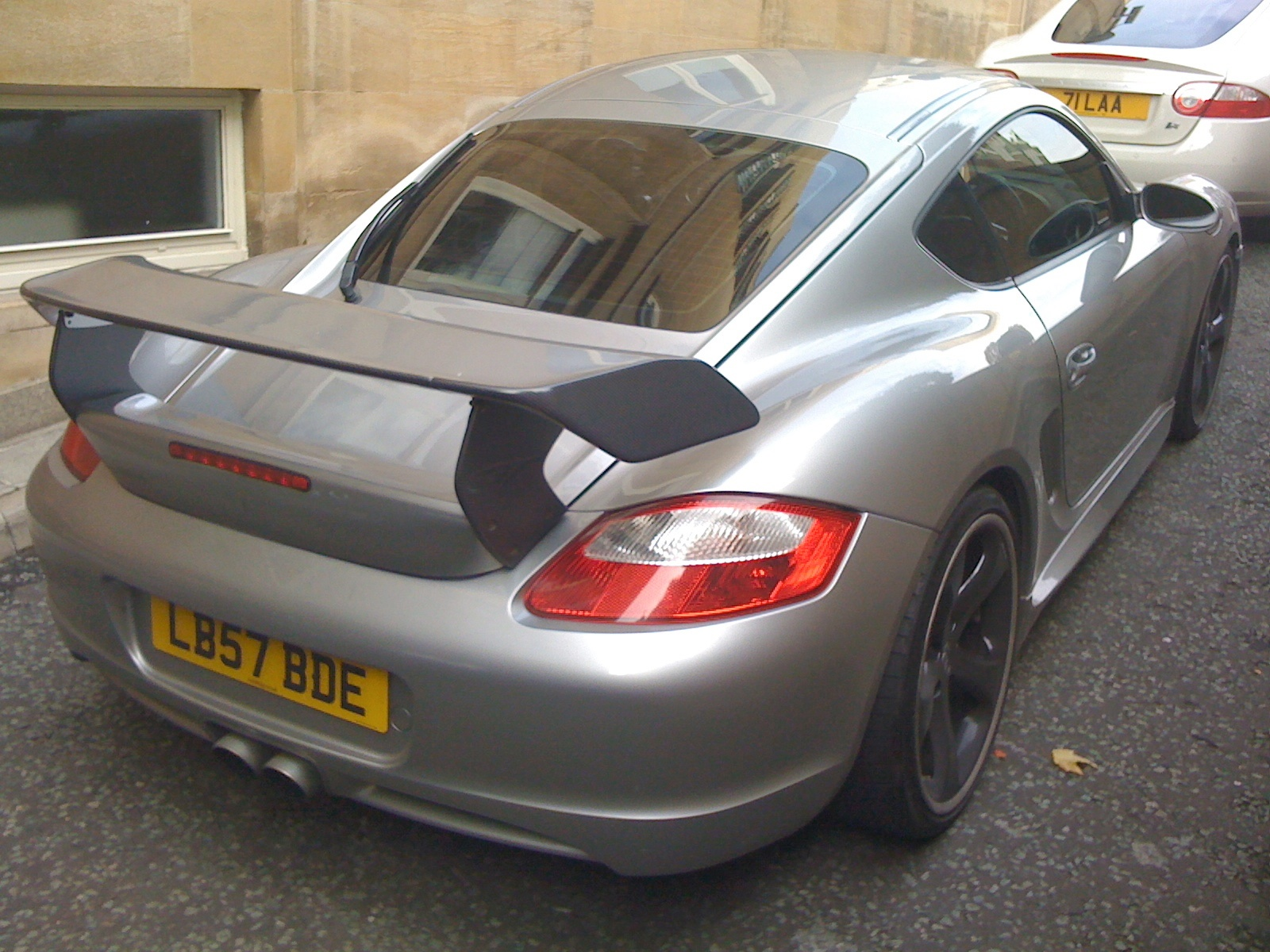
Rear view of a TechArt GTsport

TechArt takes the Porsche Cayman S a step beyond the capabilities of the stock production model. An upgraded 3.8L flat-6 rated at 385 hp is the soul of the GTsport. This modified sports coupe is capable of speeds up to 177.1 mph and a 0-60 time of 4.8 seconds. Upgrades to the engine include a sports camshaft, aluminum headers, modified intake manifold, high performance exhaust system and a remapped ECU. Aerodynamic upgrades include a revised front and rear fascia with larger air ducts with rear diffuser, carbon fiber air splitter and mirrors, restyled rocker panels, and fully adjustable rear wing. Suspension upgrades included TechArt VarioPlus coil-overs with adjustable ride height, light-weight 20" TechArt Formula wheels at 8.5" wide up front and 11" at the rear. The GTsport starts at $138,000 USD.

== Specifications ==
- Weight: 3,120 pounds (1,415 kg)
- Power: 385 hp (287 kW) @ 6600 rpm
- Torque: 300.2 lb⋅ft (407 N⋅m) @ 4600 rpm
- Specific Output: 100.7 hp (75 kW) per litre
- 0-60 mph (97 km/h): 4.9 sec
- Top Speed: 177 mph (284.9 km/h)
