= TechArt 997 Carrera =

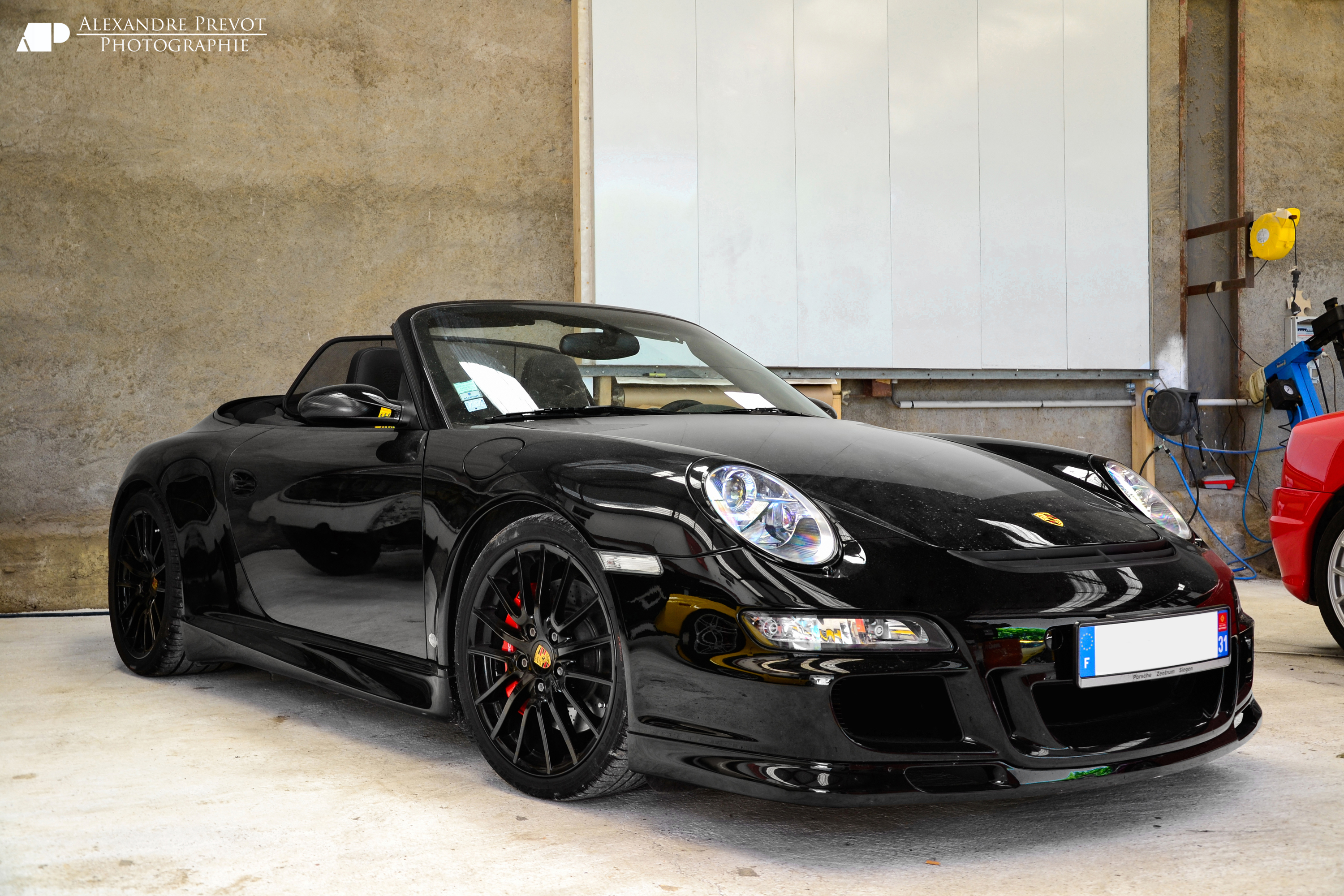

Overview
- Manufacturer: TECHART (modified Porsche)
- Production: 2005-present

Body and chassis
- Class: sports car
- Body style: 2-door coupé
- Layout: Rear-engine, rear-wheel drive or all wheel drive
- Related: Porsche 997

Powertrain
- Engine: 3.6 L (219.7 cu in) flat-6 3.8 L (231.9 cu in) flat-6
- Transmission: 6-speed manual 5-speed Tiptronic

Chronology
- Predecessor: TechArt 996 Carrera

The TechArt 997 Carrera, known also as the TechArt Coupe and TechArt Cabrio, depending on the body style, is a tuning program for Porsche 997 models including the Carrera, Carrera Cabriolet, Carrera 4, Carrera 4 Cabriolet, Carrera S, Carrera S Cabriolet, Carrera 4S, and Carrera 4S Cabriolet. As with other TechArt products, the kit includes the customer's choice of options, including a body kit, engine upgrades, interior refitment, and custom wheels.

== Design and features ==
The TechArt Coupe/Cabriolet features a bodykit with high-downforce front and rear spoilers, a rear diffuser, side skirts, and mirror and headlight housings. The car is fitted with TechArt Formula alloy wheels ranging from 18 to 20 inches, and ContiSportContact 2 VMax tires. A full range of interior customizations are available and tailored to customer taste. To aid the car's performance, a range of suspension kits, depending on the wheel and tire combinations, can be installed. The basic kit lowers the car by 25 millimetres (1.0 in), while the most advanced kit, the TechArt Vario sport suspension, uses Bilstein adjustable rebound shock absorbers and variable ride height control which can lower the car up to 35 millimetres (1.4 in). The engine upgrades utilize custom exhaust, reprogrammed ECU chips, and performance air cleaners to add 15 horsepower (11 kW) to either the basic 3.6 L Carrera engine or the larger 3.8 L Carrera S engine, resulting in final outputs of 340 horsepower (254 kW) and 370 horsepower (276 kW), respectively.

== Police car ==
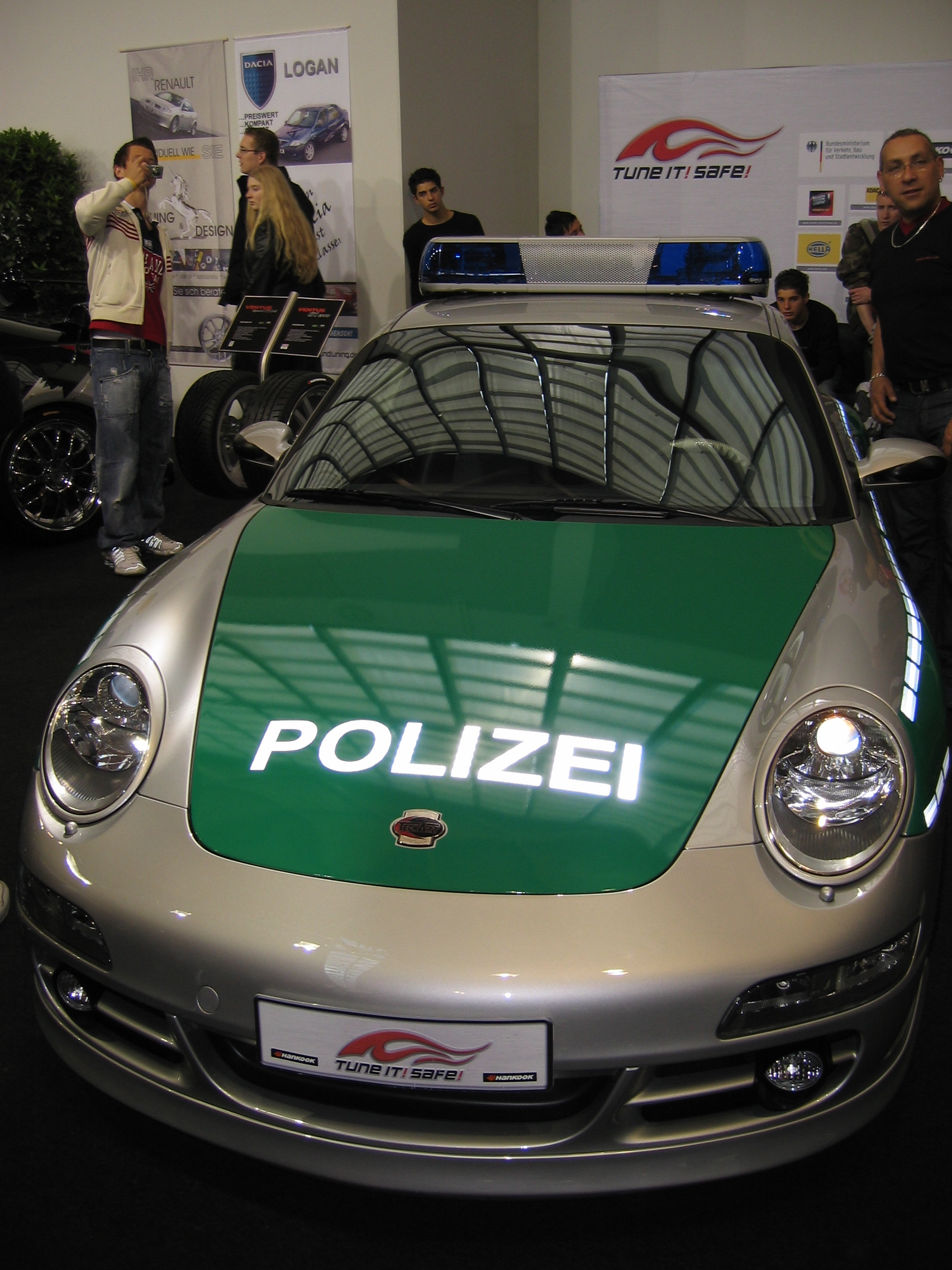
TECHART police car

A police-specification version based on the 911 Carrera S was unveiled in 2005 as part of the "TUNE IT! SAFE!" initiative.
