= TechArt Magnum =

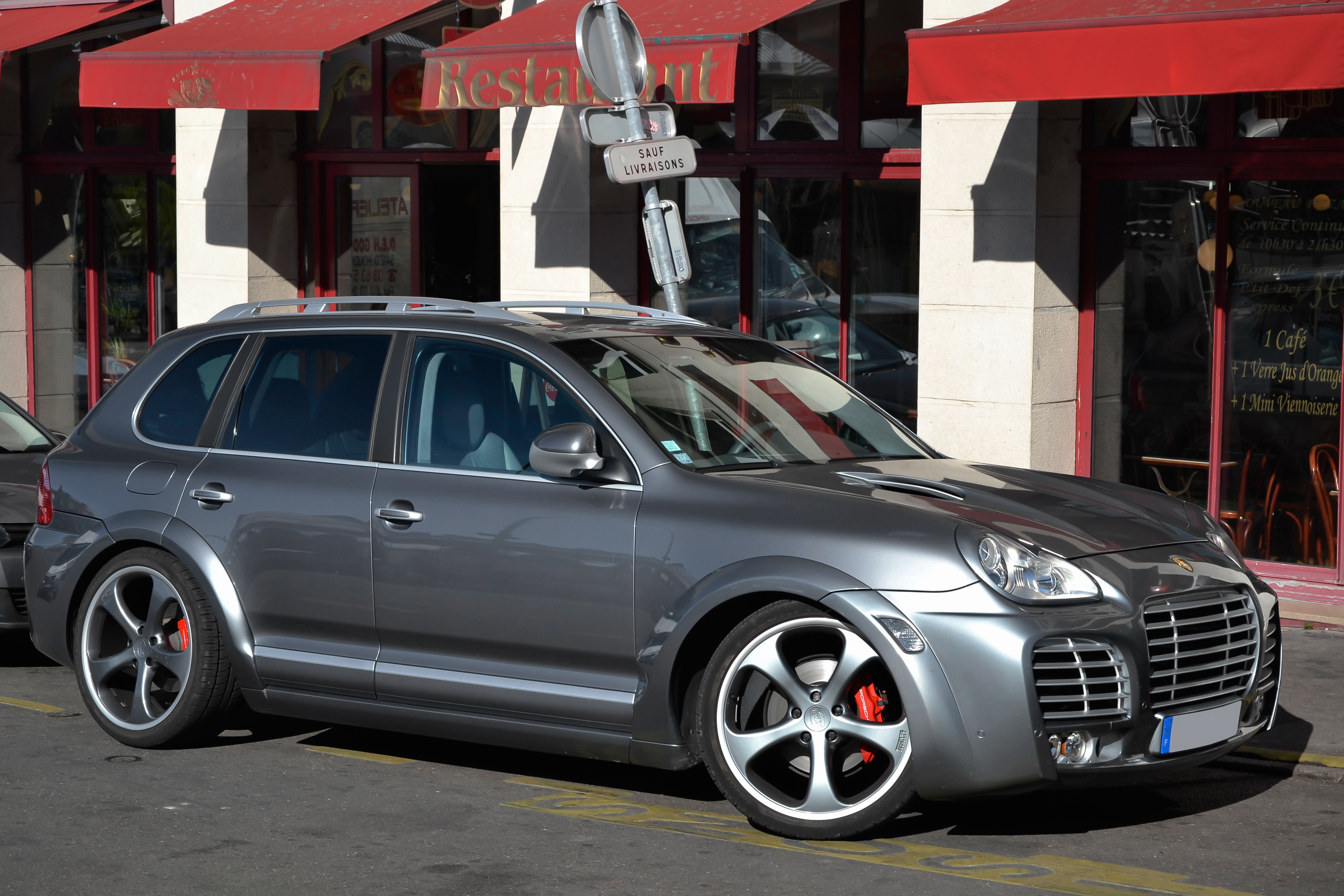

Overview
- Manufacturer: TechArt (modified Porsche)
- Production: 2007-

Body and chassis
- Class: mid-size SUV
- Body style: 4-door SUV
- Layout: Front-engine, all wheel drive
- Related: Porsche Cayenne

Powertrain
- Engine: 4.5L (274.6 cu in) twin-turbocharged V8
- Transmission: 6-speed automatic

Dimensions
- Curb weight: 5,245 pounds (2,379 kg)

The TechArt Magnum is a high-performance luxury SUV based on the Porsche Cayenne. As with other TechArt products, the Magnum has added features such as a bodykit, interior refitment, and engine and suspension upgrades.

== Design and Features ==
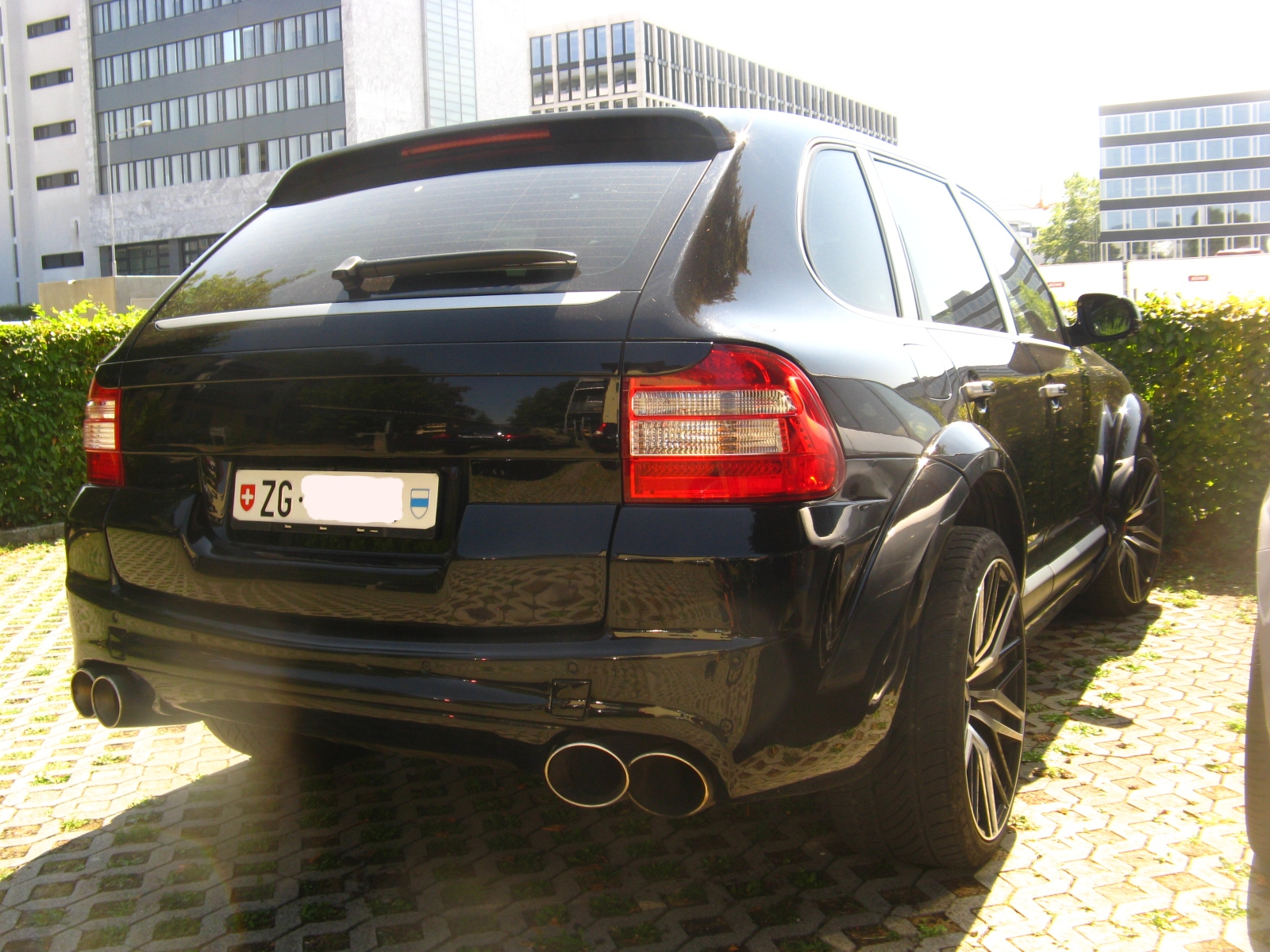
TechArt Magnum- rear view

To the standard Porsche Cayenne turbo, TechArt has added a radical bodykit made of PUR-RIM plastic, which includes new high-downforce air dams, side skirts, and aero hood. Also added are 22 inch (556 mm) TechArt Formula II alloy wheels and ContiCrossContact UHP tires, and interior trim of the customer's choice (with the "de Sede of Switzerland" being the highest trim level available, built in cooperation with the furniture manufacturer of the same name). The most significant changes, however, are in the engine and suspension. The stock 4.5L (274.6 cu in) V8 turbo has been modified with larger turbochargers, stainless steel exhaust, and an upgraded ECU chip, bringing output to 600 horsepower (447 kW) and 645 lb⋅ft (875 N⋅m) of torque, both at 3440 rpm. The Magnum is also lowered up to 30 millimetres (1.2 in) with adjustable performance air-ride suspension, which greatly aids handling for the heavy vehicle. With the full set of upgrades, the Magnum costs about $204,000 USD; Premier League defender Micah Richards who plays for Manchester City had one imported to the UK.

== Specifications ==
- Weight: 5,245 pounds (2,379 kg)
- Power: 600 hp (447 kW) @ 3440 rpm
- Torque: 645 lb⋅ft (875 N⋅m) @ 3440 rpm
- Specific output: approx. 133.3 hp (99 kW) per litre
- Power-to-weight ratio: approx. 8.74 pounds (3.96 kg) per horsepower

=== Performance ===
- 0-60 mph (97 km/h): 4.2 sec
- 0-100 mph (161 km/h): 9.5 sec
- Quarter mile: 12.7 sec @ 108.9 mph (175.3 km/h)
- Top Speed: 181 mph (291.3 km/h)
- Braking, 60 mph (97 km/h)-0: 128 feet (39 m)
- Braking, 80 mph (129 km/h)-0: 222 feet (68 m)
- Lateral acceleration: .90g
