= Livery (disambiguation) =

A livery is a uniform, insignia or symbol that denotes a relationship between the wearer of the livery and an individual or corporate body.

Livery may also refer to:

- Livery yard, a stable in which horse owners pay to keep their horses
- Aircraft livery, a set of insignia which operators apply to their aircraft
- Boat livery, a boathouse or dock where boats are let out for hire
- Canoe livery, a boat livery specializing in canoes or kayaks
- Taxicab livery, a set of insignia applied to taxicabs
- Livery collar, a type of jewelry
- Livery company, a type of company in the City of London, United Kingdom
- Livery in law, in legal terminology
- Operation Livery, a British naval air operation during World War II

== See also ==
- List of airline liveries and logos
- British Rail corporate liveries
