= Livery =

Uniform, insignia or symbol

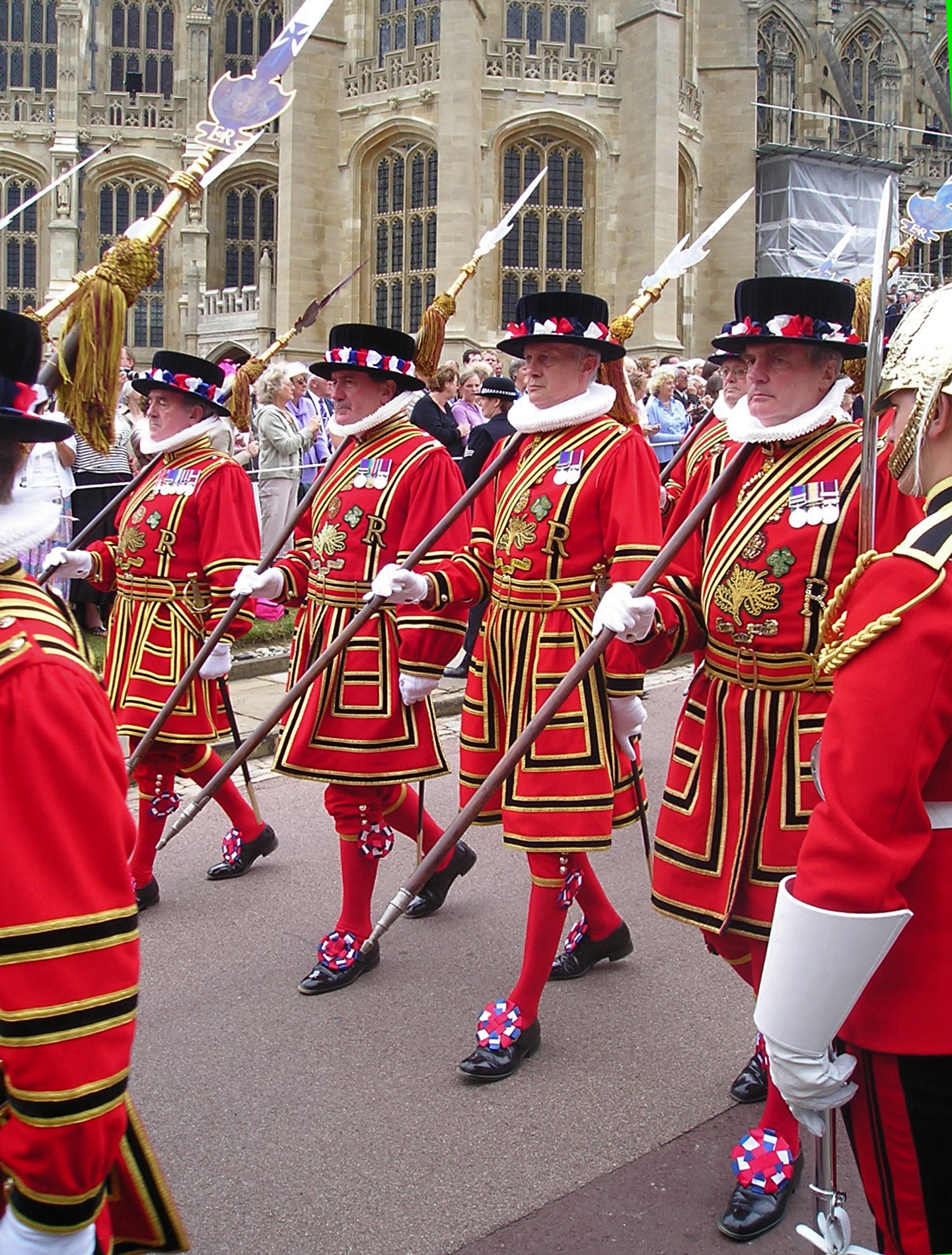
Yeomen of the Guard processing to St George's Chapel, Windsor for the annual service of the Order of the Garter in 2006

A livery /ˈlɪvəri/ is an identifying design, such as a uniform, ornament, symbol, or insignia that designates ownership or affiliation, often found on an individual or vehicle. Livery often includes elements of the heraldry relating to the individual or corporate body featured in the livery. Alternatively, some kind of a personal emblem or badge, or a distinctive colour, is featured.

The word itself derives from the French livrée, meaning dispensed, handed over. Most often it would indicate that the wearer of the livery was a servant, dependant, follower or friend of the owner of the livery, or, in the case of objects, that the object belonged to them.

In the late medieval phenomenon of bastard feudalism, livery badges worn by the "retainers" of great lords, sometimes in effect private armies, became a great political concern in England.

== Etymology ==
"In the Black Book of 1483, it was laid down that each person should receive '... for his Livery at night, half a chet loaf, one quart of wine. one gallon of ale; and for Winter livery...one percher wax, one candle wax...'"

"Edmund Spenser noted in 1596 that '... the liverye is sayd to be served up all night, that is theyr nyghtes allowances of drinks...'"

In the early inventories of households, in the chambers there are a large number of "Livery Cupboards" recorded, presumably used for storing the Livery.

During the 12th century, specific colours denoting a great person began to be used for both his soldiers and his civilian followers (the two often overlapped considerably), and the modern sense of the term began to form. Usually two different colours were used together (and often with a device or badge sewn on), but the ways in which they were combined varied with rank. Often the colours used were different each year. In addition to embroidered badges, metal ones were sewn on to clothing, or hung on neck-chains or (by far the most prestigious) livery collars. From the 16th century onwards, only the lower-status followers tended to receive clothes in livery colours (whilst the higher status ones received cash) and the term "servant", previously much wider, also began to be restricted to describing the same people. Municipalities and corporations copied the behaviour of the great households.

The term is also used to describe badges, buttons and grander pieces of jewellery containing the heraldic signs of an individual, which were given by that person to friends, followers and distinguished visitors, as well as (in more modest forms) servants. The grandest of these is the livery collar. William, Lord Hastings the favourite of King Edward IV of England had a "Coller of gold of K. Edward's lyverys" valued at the enormous sum of £40 in an inventory of 1489. This would have been similar to the collars worn by Hastings' sister and her husband Sir John Donne in the Donne Triptych by Hans Memling (described in Sir John Donne). Lords gave their servants lead or pewter badges to sew onto their clothes. In the 15th century, European royalty sometimes distributed uniform suits of clothes to courtiers, as the House of Fugger, the leading bankers, did to all employees.

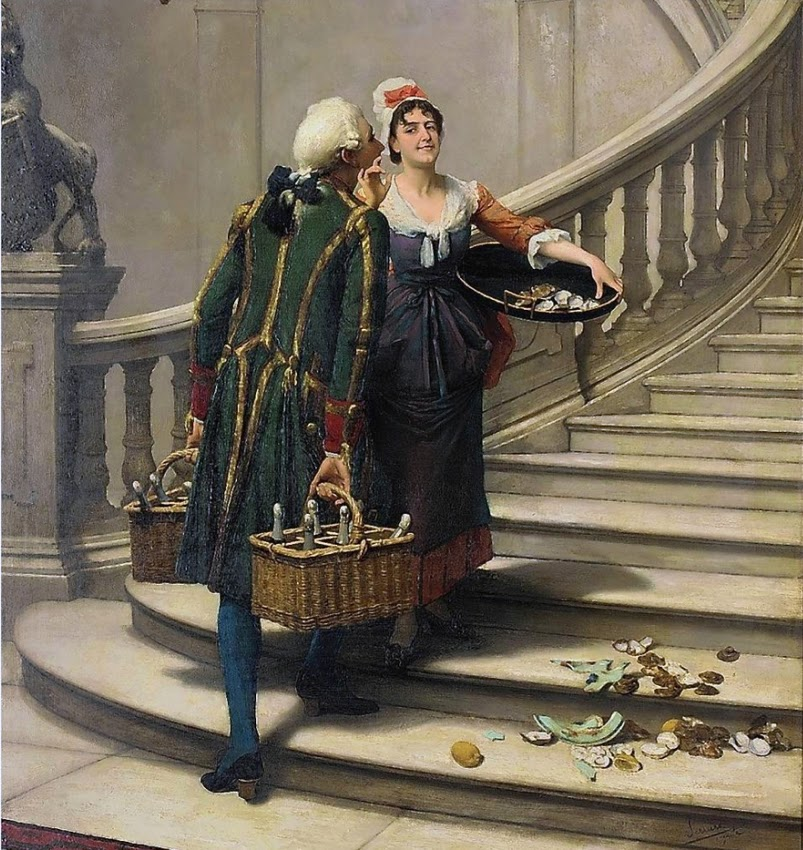
Footman c. 1780 in braided livery

This practice later contracted to the provision of standardized clothing to male servants, often in a colour-scheme distinctive to a particular family. The term most notably referred to the embroidered coats, waistcoats, knee breeches and stockings in 18th-century style, worn by footmen on formal occasions in grand houses. Plainer clothing in dark colours and without braiding was worn by footmen, chauffeurs and other employees for ordinary duties. For financial reasons, the employment of such servants, and their expensive dress, died out after World War I except in royal households.

== At European courts ==
Most European royal courts still use their state liveries on formal occasions. These are generally in traditional national colours, and are based on 18th-century clothing with fine gold embroidery. Only male royal servants normally wear livery. Knee breeches are worn, normally with white silk stockings; one exception being the Spanish court which prescribes red.

=== United Kingdom ===
At the British royal court, scarlet state livery is still worn by footmen, coachmen and other attendants on state occasions. The full-dress scarlet coats are handmade, and embroidered in gold braid with the royal cypher of the monarch. Gold buttons and other trimmings are of designs and patterns which date from the 18th century, and the full state dress worn by footmen includes scarlet breeches, stockings and a sword. On other formal occasions, a 'semi-state' dress is worn: a scarlet tail coat, black trousers and a white stiff shirt and bow tie. Normal day-to-day dress (as worn by footmen on duty in the palace, except on special occasions) consists of a black tail coat and trousers, white shirt and black tie and a scarlet waistcoat with gold trimming. Pages wear similar daily, semi-state and (very occasionally) state liveries, but in dark blue rather than scarlet. The uniform clothing issued to full-time royal staff is tailor-made, but the seldom-worn full-state dress is not bespoke; the usual practice is to select individuals whose height fits the existing ceremonial coats held in storage.

Pages of Honour to the king wear scarlet (or, in Scotland, green) frock coats with blue velvet cuffs, edged all round with gold lace, with white breeches and hose, a short sword and other accoutrements.

Scarlet is the livery colour of the sovereign and of the royal court. Elizabeth II also had a family livery colour, however, known as 'Edinburgh Green', which she and the Duke of Edinburgh chose in 1948. Five years later, at her coronation, while the Queen's attendants wore scarlet the page in attendance on the Duke wore a green livery edged in silver. Subsequently, Edinburgh Green became the colour used for their private cars and carriages (whereas the official vehicles are painted in a royal livery colour of maroon (or 'claret') and black). The Queen, the Duchess of Cornwall, the Princess Royal, the Queen of Spain and Princess Beatrix of the Netherlands wore outfits with the shades of Edinburgh Green at a thanksgiving service for the duke in 2022.

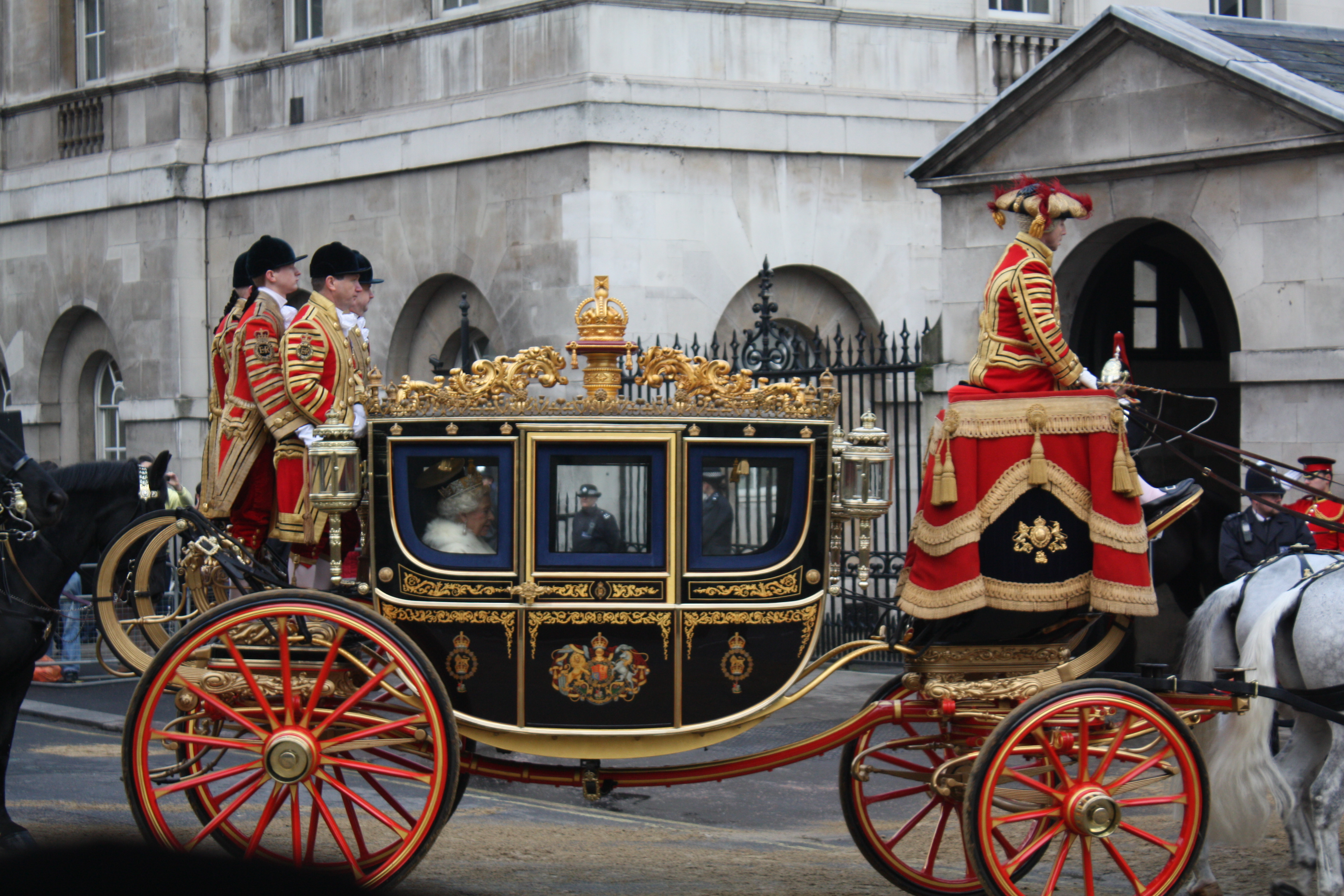
Coachman and footmen in state livery for the State Opening of Parliament

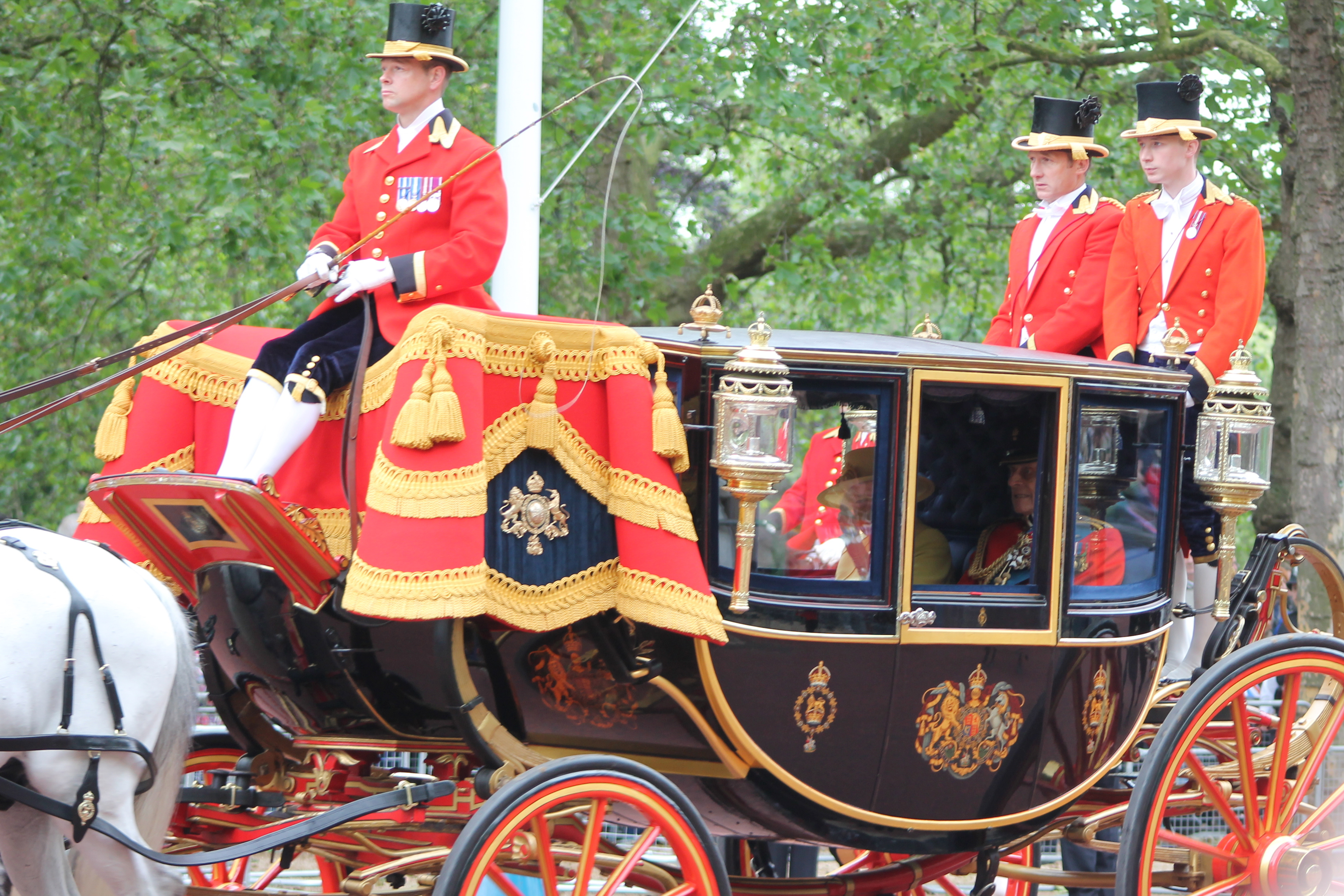
Coachman and footmen in semi-state livery for the Queen's Birthday Parade

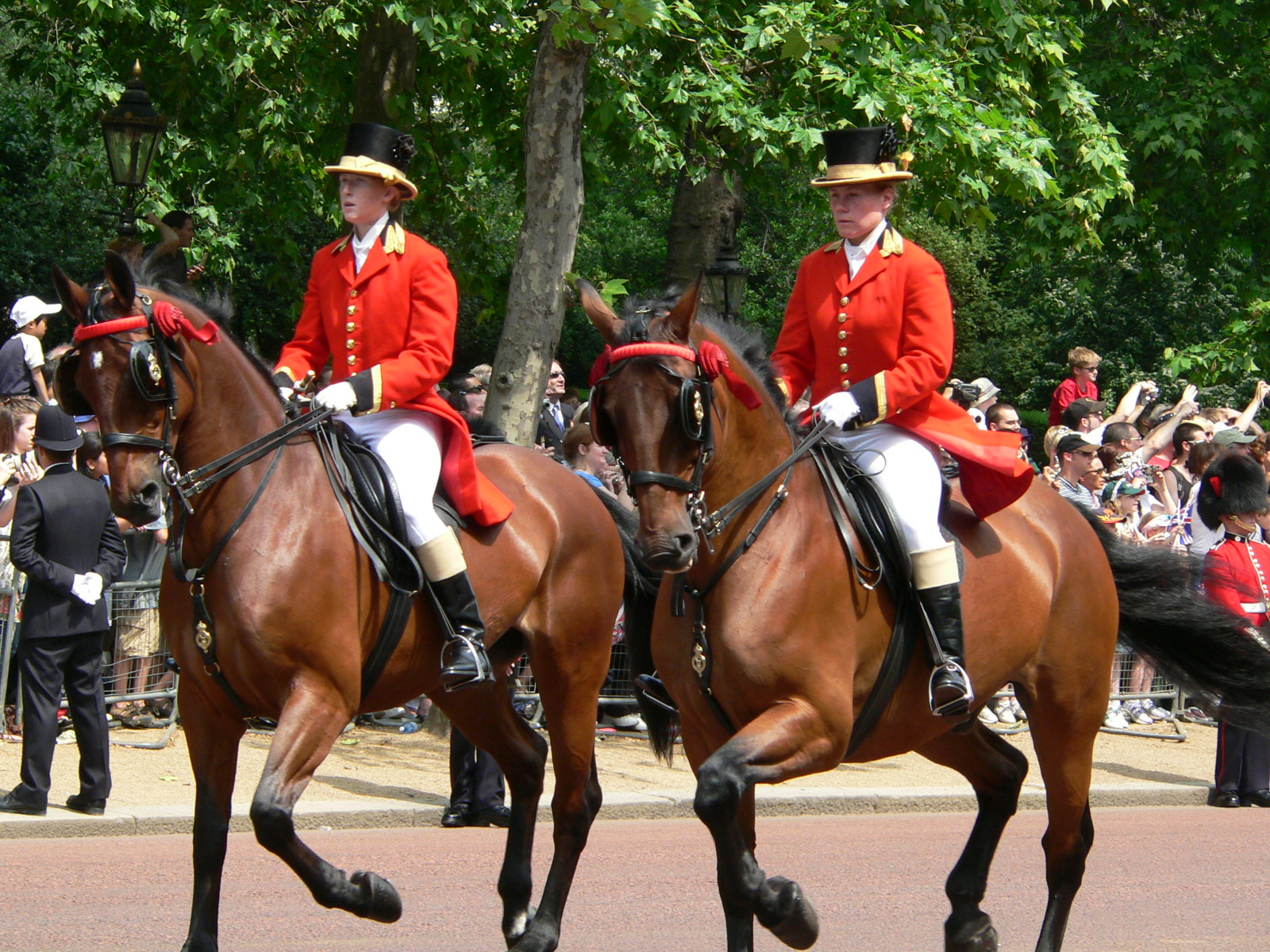
Outriders from the Royal Mews, wearing scarlet livery

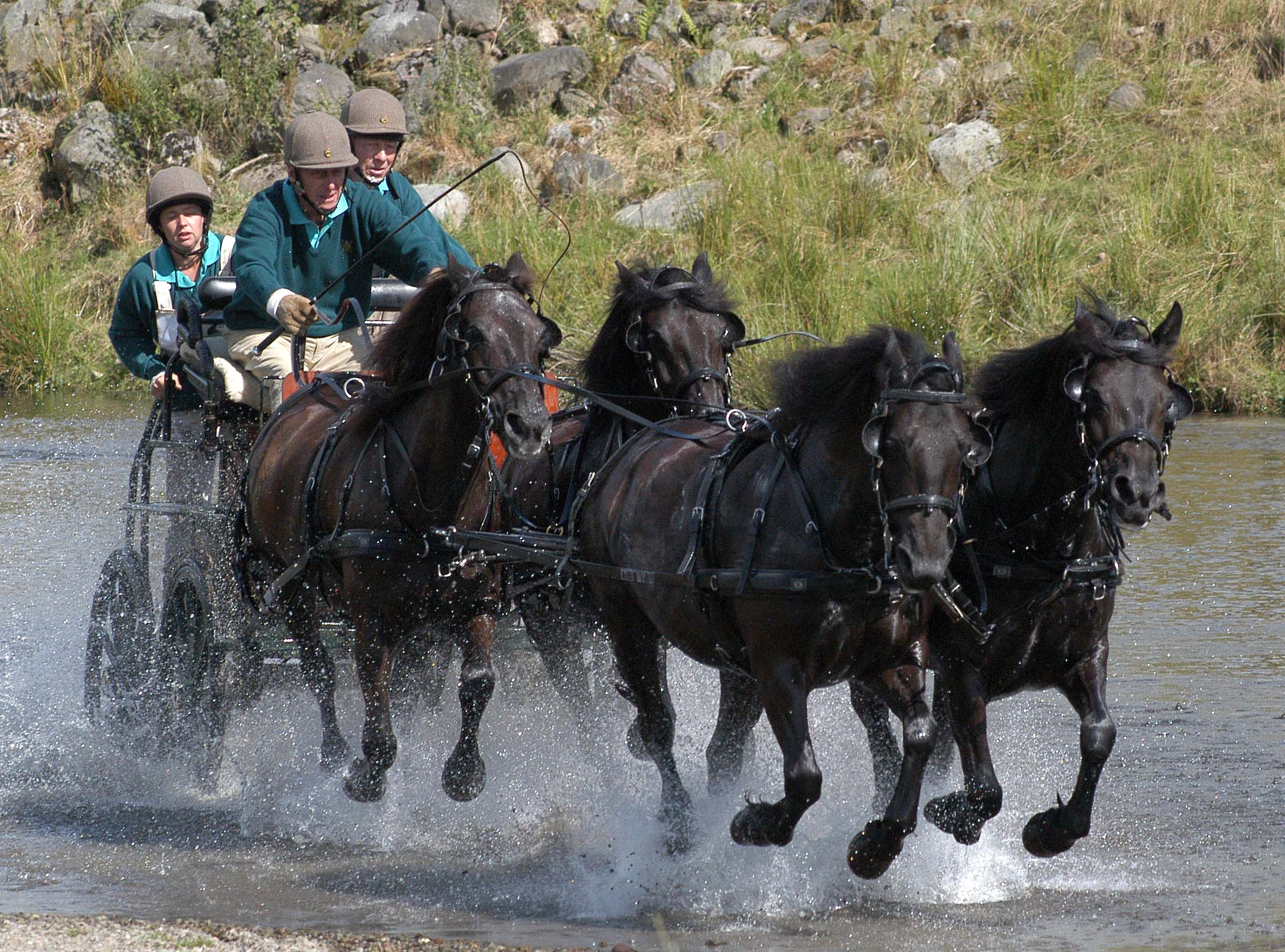
The Duke of Edinburgh chose green pullovers for his team's uniform during cross-country driving competitions.

=== Belgium ===
At the Belgian court liveries in traditional colours are still used at state occasions. The coats are red, and have black cuffs with golden lace. Royal cyphers are embroidered on the shoulders. The breeches are of yellow fabric. The semi-state livery worn for less formal occasions has black breeches.

=== The Netherlands ===
At the Dutch court the full state livery is blue (nassaublauw). The breeches are yellow, and cuffs are red.

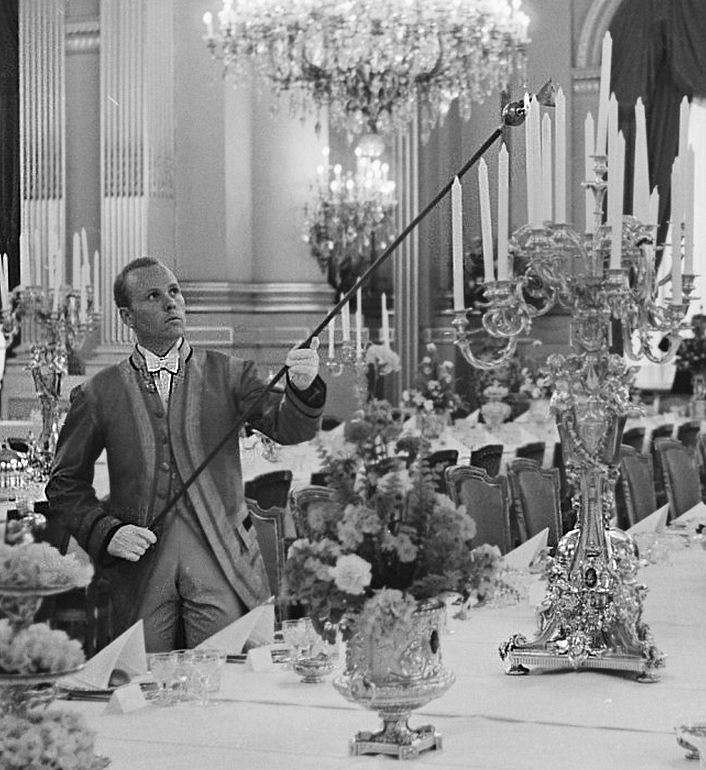
Belgian court livery c. 1960

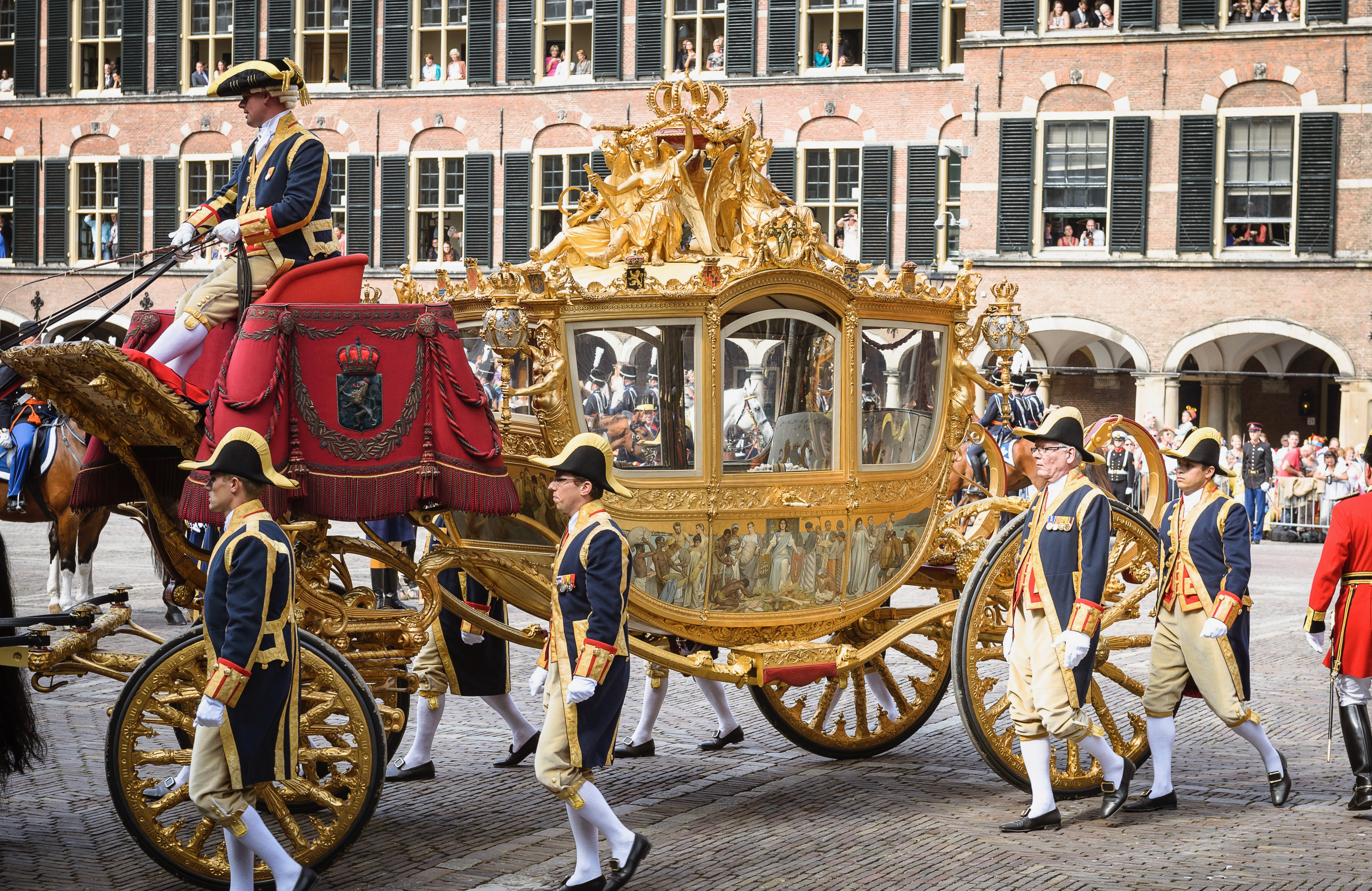
Dutch court state livery

== Sue one's livery ==
The phrase "to sue one's livery" refers to the formal recognition of a noble's majority, in exchange of payment, for conferring the powers attached to his title, and thereby freeing him from dependence as a ward.

== Modern usage ==
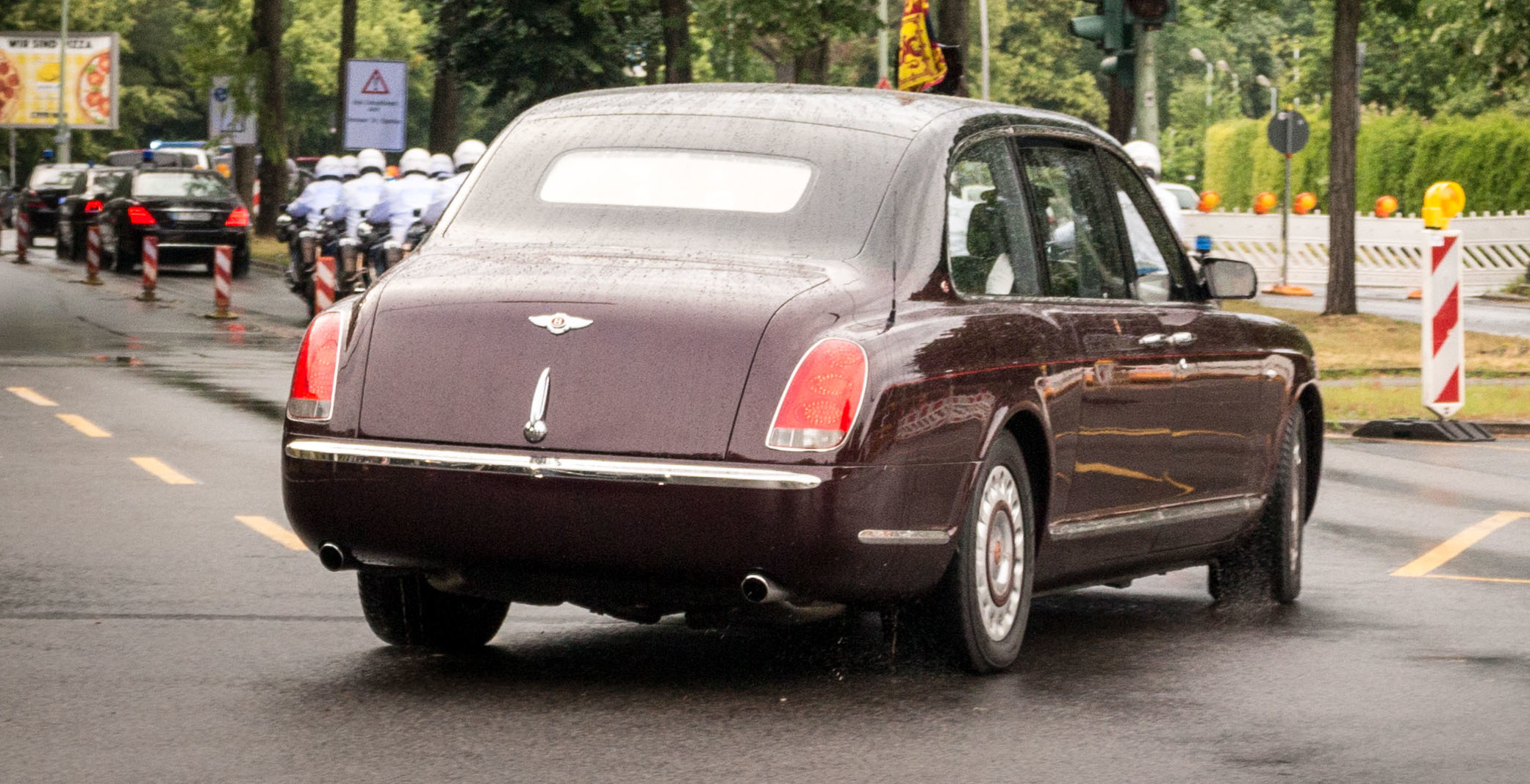
Royal livery of claret and black, as used on state cars and carriages in the UK

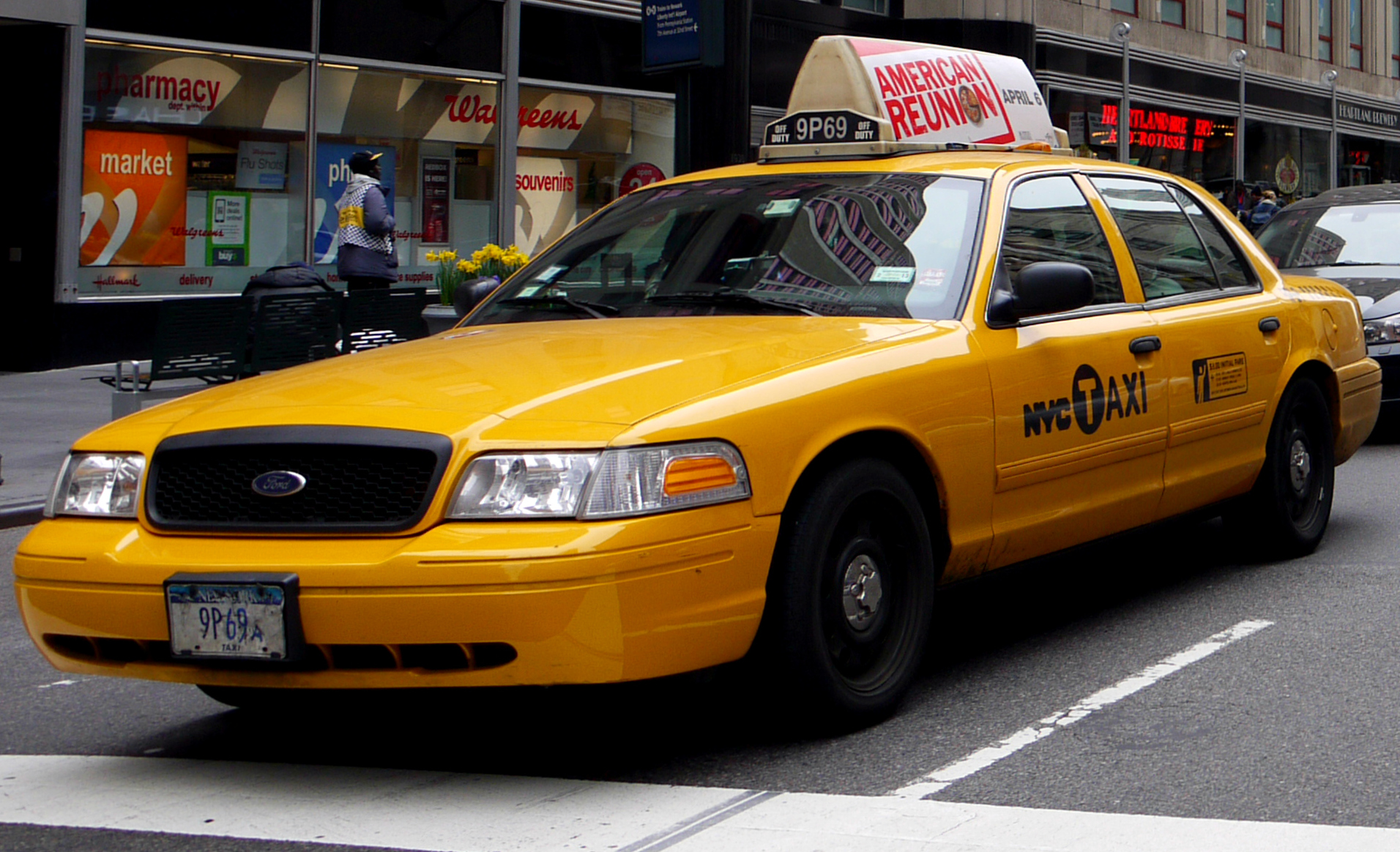
New York City taxicab in mandated yellow taxi cab livery

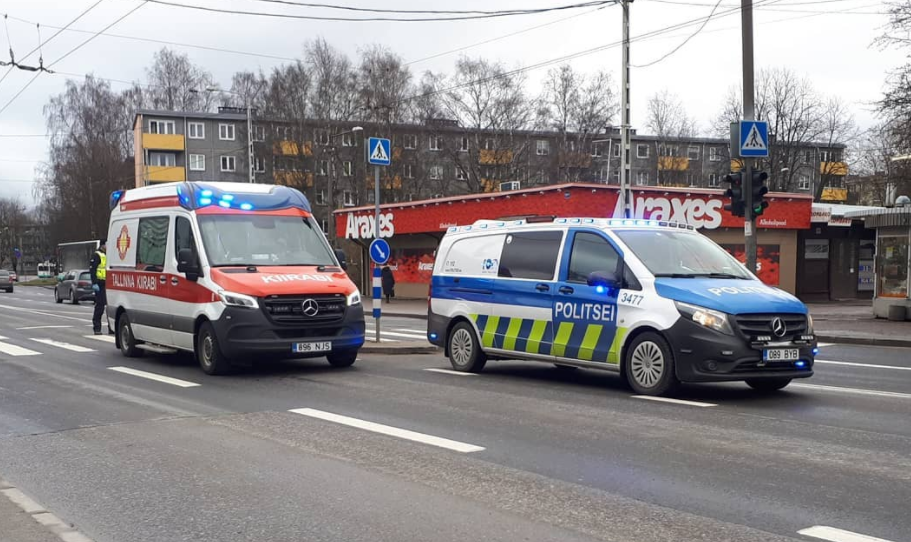
An Estonian ambulance and police van in Tallinn, displaying their respective fleet liveries

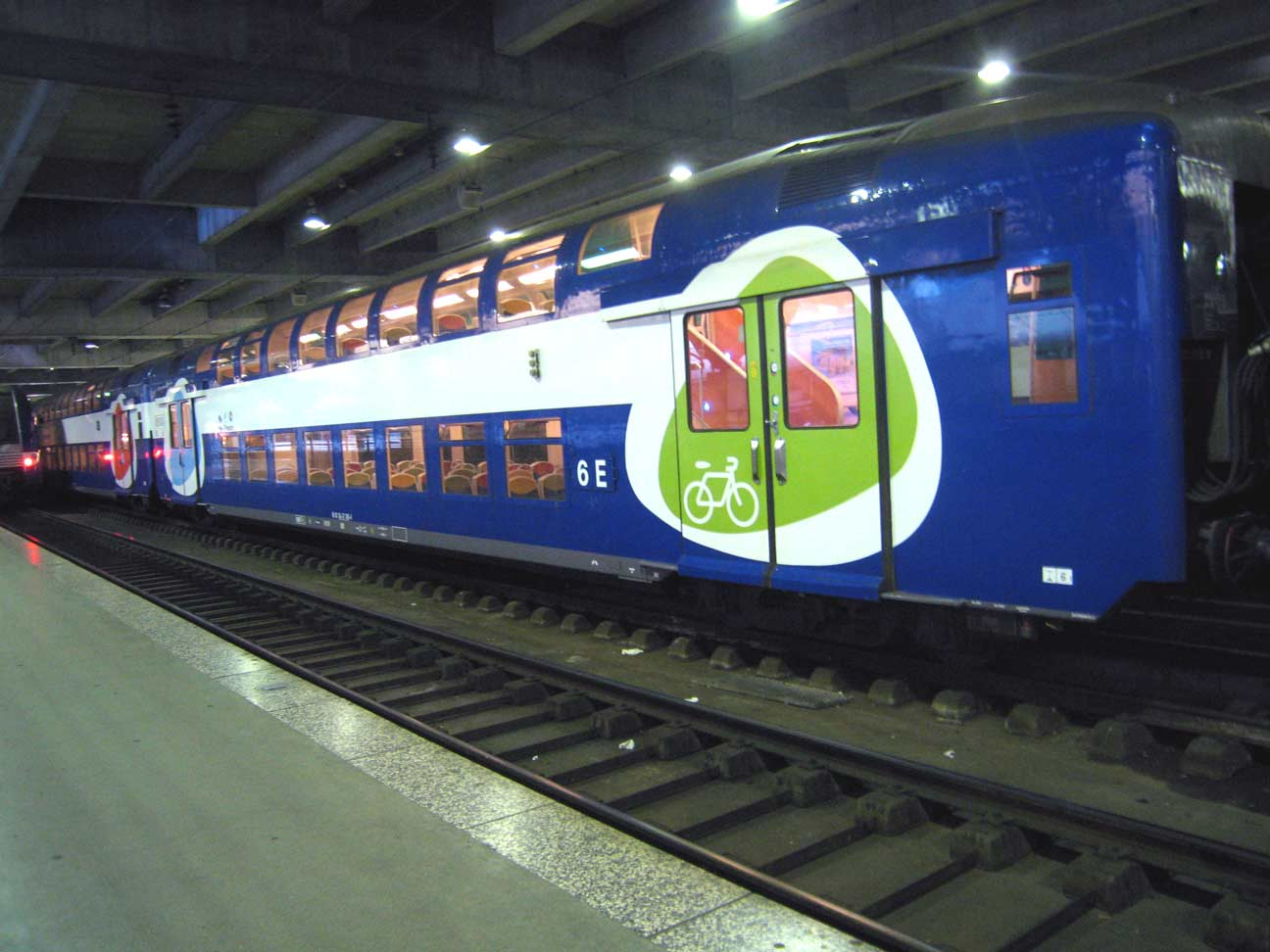
Transilien rolling stock livery in Paris, design by the French agency RCP Design Global

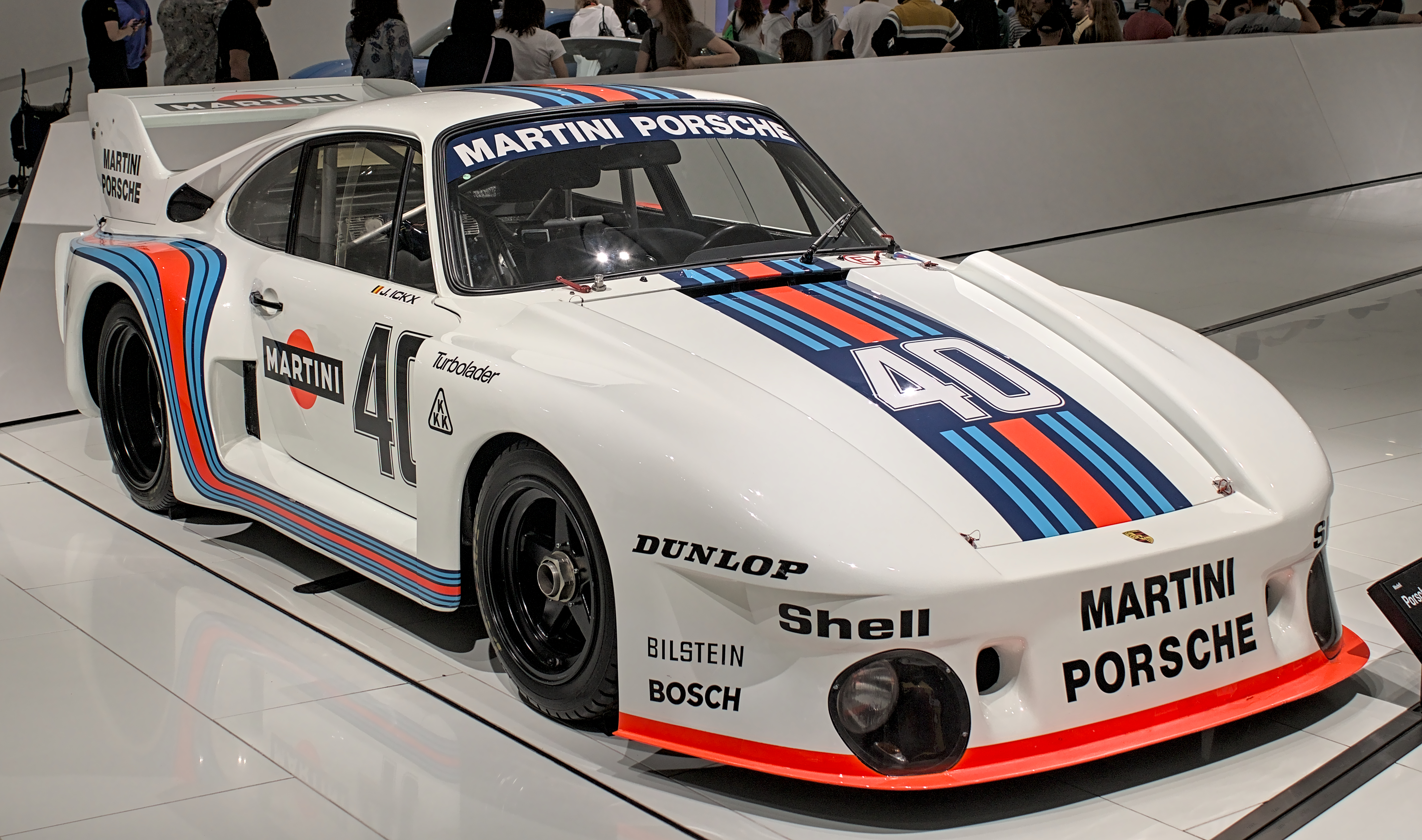
Porsche 935 in iconic Martini Racing livery

From this core meaning, multiple extended or specialist meanings have derived, mostly related to exterior graphic designs on vehicles. Examples include:

- A livery company is the name used for a guild in the City of London; members of the company were allowed to dress their servants in the distinctive uniform of their trade, and the company's charters enabled them to prevent others from embarking upon the trades within the company's jurisdiction.
- A fleet livery is the common design and paint scheme a business or organization uses on its fleet vehicles, often using specific colors and logo placement. For example, the United Parcel Service has trucks with a well-known brown livery. This may sometimes used alongside wrap advertising. Fleet liveries can be used to promote a brand or for unrelated advertising compared to the goods contained in the vehicle. This can enable companies to become iconic as a result of their livery. An example is the truck fleet of Eddie Stobart Group, which has a deal with Corgi to sell replicas of their trucks with their unique red, green, and white livery.
  - Fleet liveries are also used by emergency services to make emergency vehicles visually distinct from civilian traffic, allowing for higher visibility and easy identification. Depending on the policies of the agency and the scope of its jurisdiction, the livery used by an emergency vehicle fleet may be the same or similar across a municipality, region, or entire country; alternatively, they may differ in each municipality or region, under each agency, or even depending on the vehicle's assigned purpose. Examples of markings and designs used in emergency vehicle liveries include black and white, Battenburg markings, Sillitoe tartan, "jam sandwich" markings, and reflective decals.
- A racing livery is the specific paint scheme and sticker design used in motorsport, on vehicles, in order to attract sponsorship and to advertise sponsors, as well as to identify vehicles as belonging to a specific racing team.
- Aircraft livery is also the term describing the paint scheme of an aircraft. Most airlines have a standard paint scheme for their aircraft fleet, usually prominently displaying the airline logo or name. From time to time special liveries are introduced, for example prior to big events.
- A "livery vehicle" remains a legal term of art in the U.S. and Canada for a vehicle for hire, such as a taxicab or chauffeured limousine, but excluding a rented vehicle driven by the renter. In some jurisdictions a "livery vehicle" covers vehicles that carry up to fifteen passengers, but not more, thus including a jitney but excluding an omnibus or motorcoach. This usage stems from the hackney cabs or coaches that could be provided by a livery stable. By extension, there are boat livery companies for the hire of watercraft. Canada has many businesses offering canoe livery.
- A livery stable (from 1705, derived from the obsolete sense of "provender for horses" found in the mid-15th century) looks after the care, feeding, stabling, etc., of horses for pay.

== Historical military usage ==
The term "livery" is now rarely applied in a military context, so it would be unusual for it to refer to a military uniform or the painting design of a military vehicle. The modern military equivalent for "livery" is the term "standard issue", which is used when referring to the colors and regulations required in respect of any military clothing or equipment.

Early uniforms were however regarded as a form of livery ("the King's coat") during the late 17th and early 18th centuries in the European monarchies. During this period, officers of the French Garde du Corps (the Royal Bodyguard) successfully petitioned to not be required to wear uniforms while on duty within the palace at Versailles, since this livery suggested that they were servants rather than aristocrats.
