= Livery in law =

Livery in law may refer to:

- Livery of seisin, an archaic legal conveyancing ceremony, practiced in feudal England and in other countries
- Sasine, in Scots law, the delivery of feudal property, typically land
- Commission for Taxi Regulation, in Ireland
- Regulation of taxi cabs, in the United States
