= Canoe livery =

Business that rents canoes or kayaks

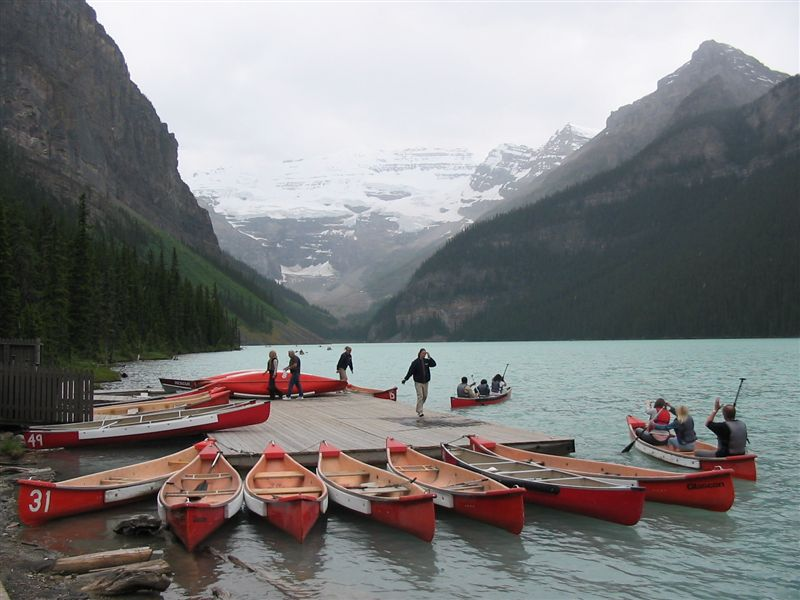
Rental canoes at Lake Louise, Banff National Park, Alberta, Canada. Note the numbers for tracking

A canoe livery or canoe rental is a business engaged in the boat livery (or rental) of canoes or kayaks. It is typically found on or near streams, rivers, or lakes that provide good recreational opportunities. A related but dissimilar business is a boat rental business, which is often distinguished by renting powered or sail craft and by not having a provision for return from a remote location. Such liveries can be found worldwide, wherever there are sufficient tourists or locals to support the activities.

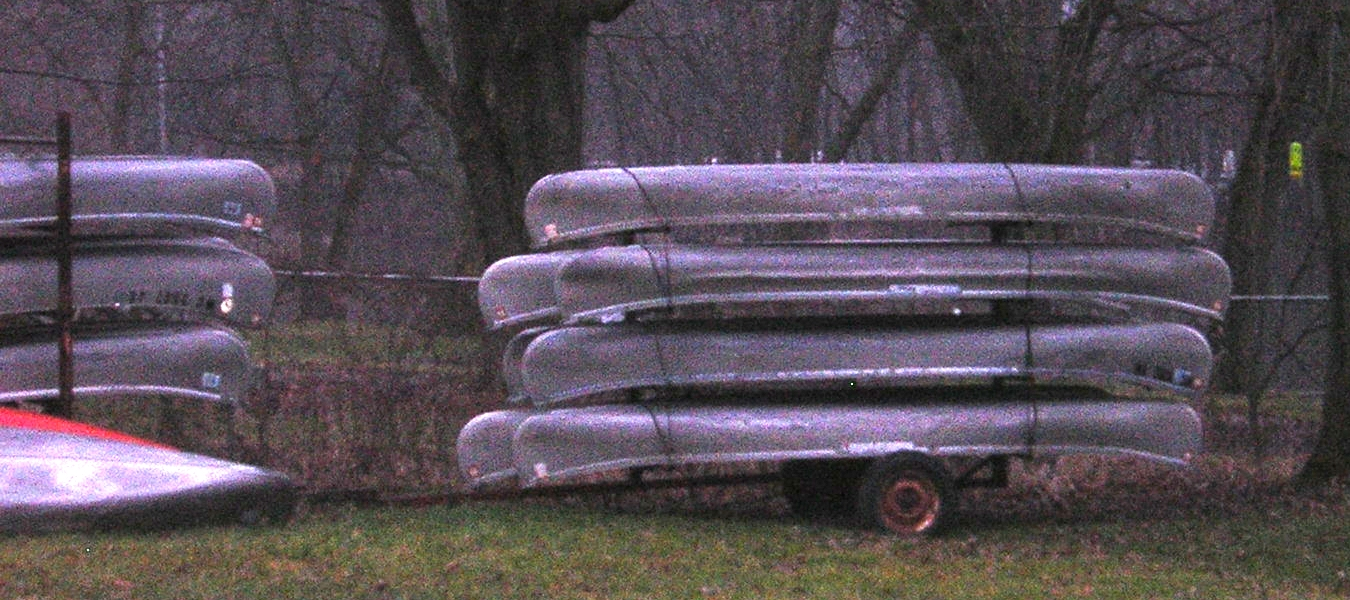
A canoe trailer used to transport 8 canoes at a time

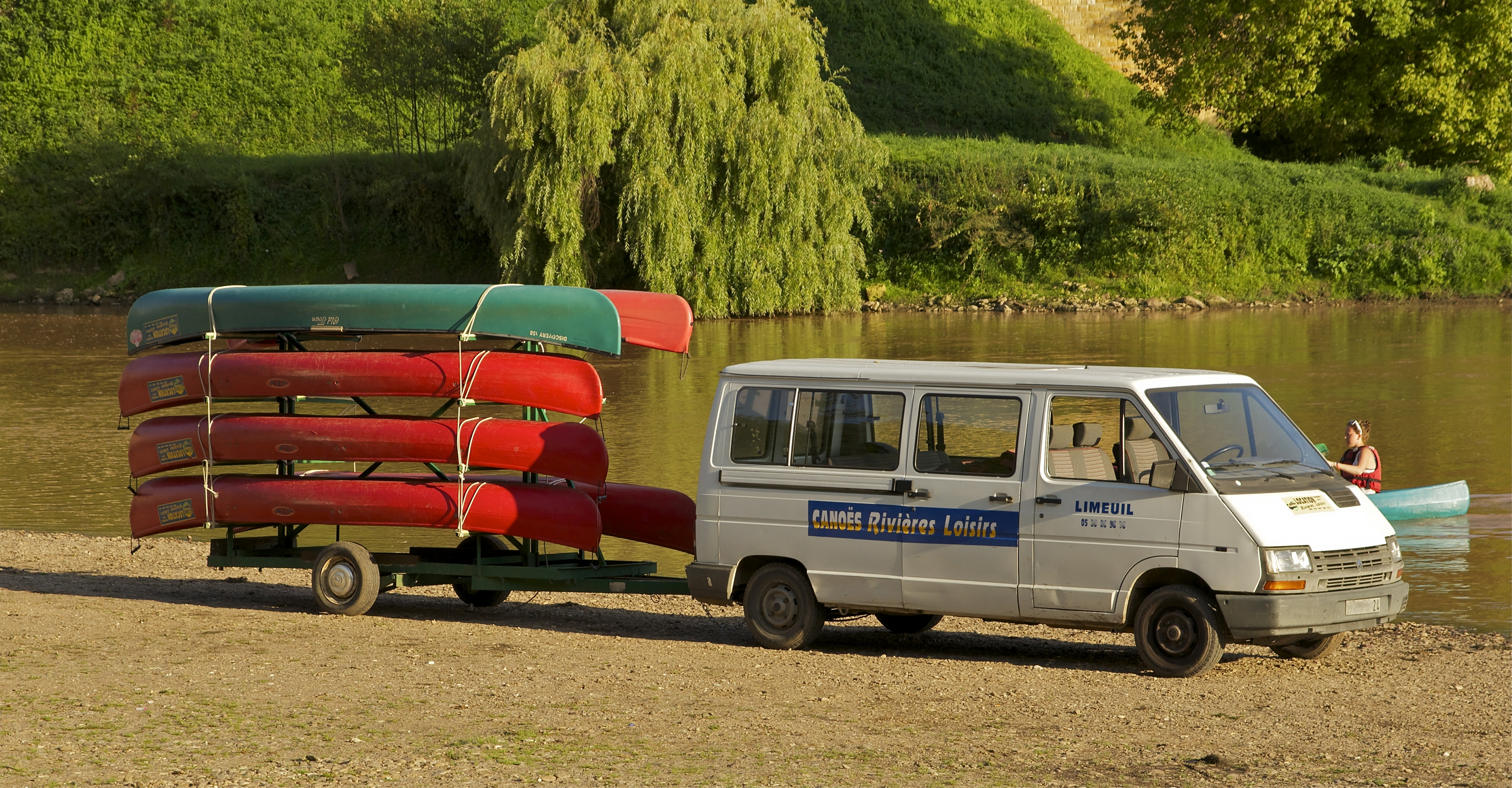
Canoe livery in France, Dordogne

== Business operations ==
=== Services ===
Rental of the watercraft and associated equipment paddles, life preservers and the like, is the basic service provided. Some optional extras offered may include liability insurance, transport of the craft back to the livery at the end of the journey, provision of a guide, or organised group outings. Some liveries rent other unpowered boats like rowboats, paddleboats (pedalos) or inflatable boats. Others also rent paddleboards and tubes. Liveries may also provide watercraft classes or training. The livery may provide camping facilities to support multi-day trips. The livery often will sell ancillary supplies (sunscreen, sunglasses, clothing, water bottles, maps and books) as an adjunct to the business. Foam blocks or chocks, and rope may be sold or provided to enable car-top transport.

=== Equipment ===
In addition to the craft themselves, the livery will often have one or more vehicles or trailers fitted out with special racks to enable transport of many craft efficiently. These vehicles can be quite large, holding as many as 20 craft or more. This is because usually the customers travel downstream from the livery and at the end of the journey, some provision for return must be made. Small liveries may have as few as four boats in their fleet, while large ones may have over one thousand.

=== Location ===
Typically, the actual rivers or lakes used are not the property of the livery (most such are held in common in most jurisdictions). In some cases, the put in, and take out, locations, may be owned by the livery, but it is common that these are owned by a park or recreation authority and the livery operates there, with or without permits, a term known as "granting a concession".

=== Liability ===
Canoeing and kayaking are sports that inherently have some risk. Typically, this risk is offloaded to the customer by having them execute a waiver. However some operators offer coverage to renters. In addition, there may be lawsuits filed against operators, despite any waivers. Specialised insurance does exist for this risk. The liability issue may impact the park or recreation agency that has granted a concession to the livery.

== Economic impact ==
Precise figures for the number of these businesses may be difficult to come by. The United States Economic Census tracks down to the Recreational Goods Rental level only, and canoe livery is a subclass of this category. As of 2002, the category had 1,757 establishments employing at least one employee, with revenue of US$521,783,000 and a payroll of US$126,376,000 covering 7,416 people. At least 344 such businesses exist in the US, and there possibly may be many more.

== See also ==
- Livery
- Sports business
