= Boat livery =

Boathouse or dock

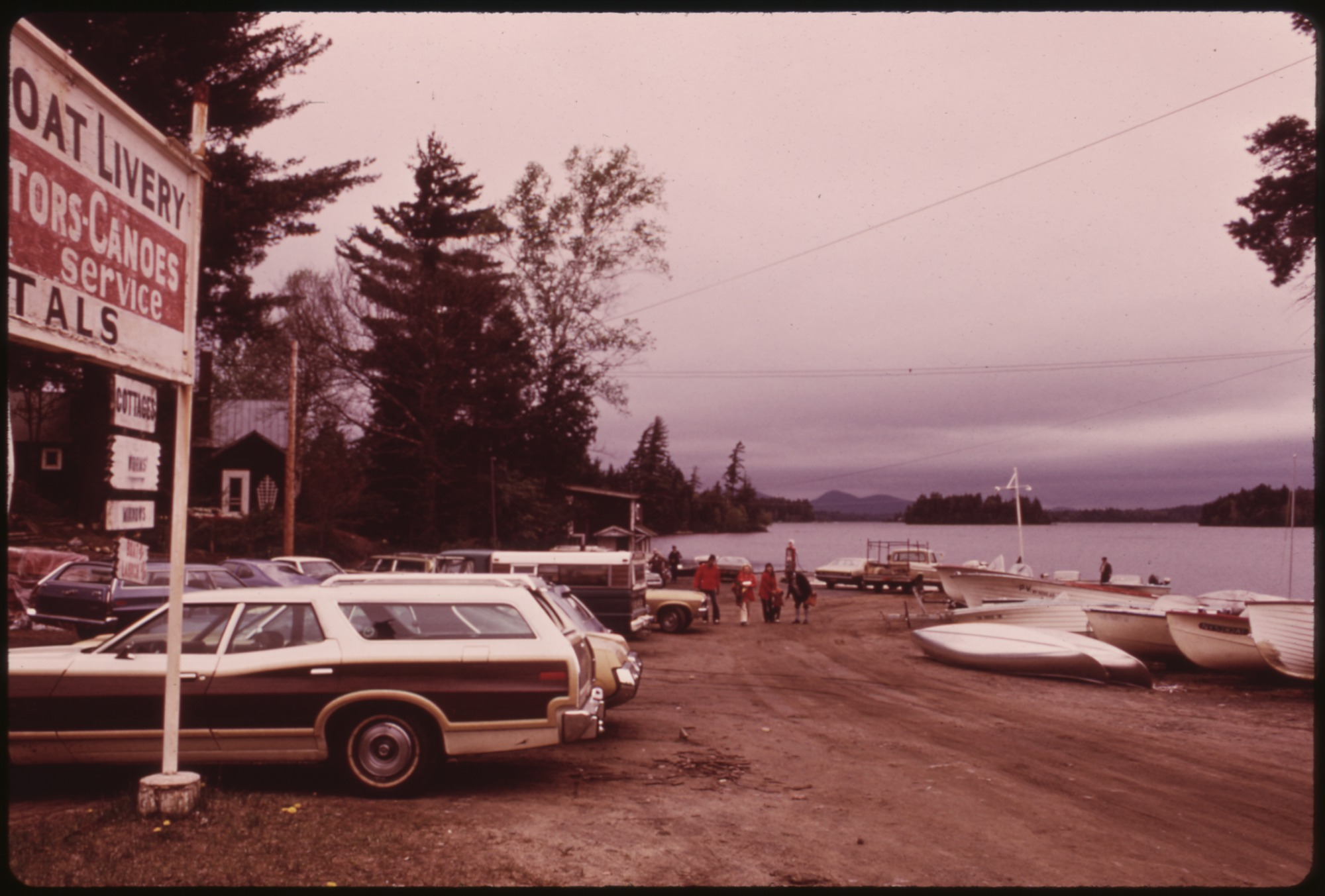
A private boat livery at Raquette Lake, New York in 1973

A boat livery is a boathouse or dock on a lake or other body of water, where boats are let out for hire (rental), usually on an hourly, daily or weekly basis. Boats may be powered or sail craft or human powered like rowboats, paddleboats (pedalos) or inflatable boats. The primary use of the boats is recreational.

== Business operations ==
=== Services ===
Rental of the watercraft and associated equipment, such as oars, motors, paddles, and life preservers, is the basic service provided. Some optional extras offered may include fishing tackle. Boat liveries may also be required or optionally provide watercraft classes or training. The livery often will sell sunscreen, sunglasses, clothing, water bottles, live bait, maps and books as supplemental income.

=== Equipment ===
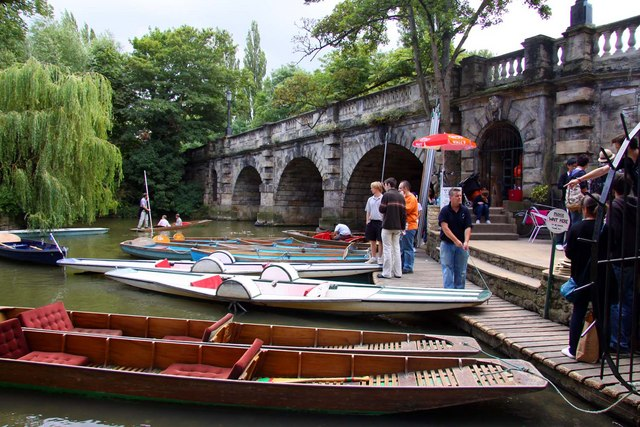
Boat rentals at Magdalen Bridge on the River Cherwell, Oxfordshire, UK

In addition to the craft themselves, liveries may also maintain a marina. Numbers of craft in the fleet can vary from one to several hundred. Fuel cost and storage is an important consideration for motorized crafts. Livery owners and employees must also clean, maintain, and store their fleet during inclement weather.

=== Location ===
Typically, the actual bodies of water used are not the property of the livery. In some cases, the launch or dock locations may be owned by the livery, "but could also be owned by a park or recreation authority and the livery operates there, with or without permits, a term known as "granting a concession".

=== Liability ===
In the United States, the insurance for boat livery owners can be expensive and difficult to obtain. According to an article in The Business Journal (Tampa Bay), keeping track of state laws and regulations is extremely important and new laws can cause expensive challenges for a livery operator.

== Economic impact ==
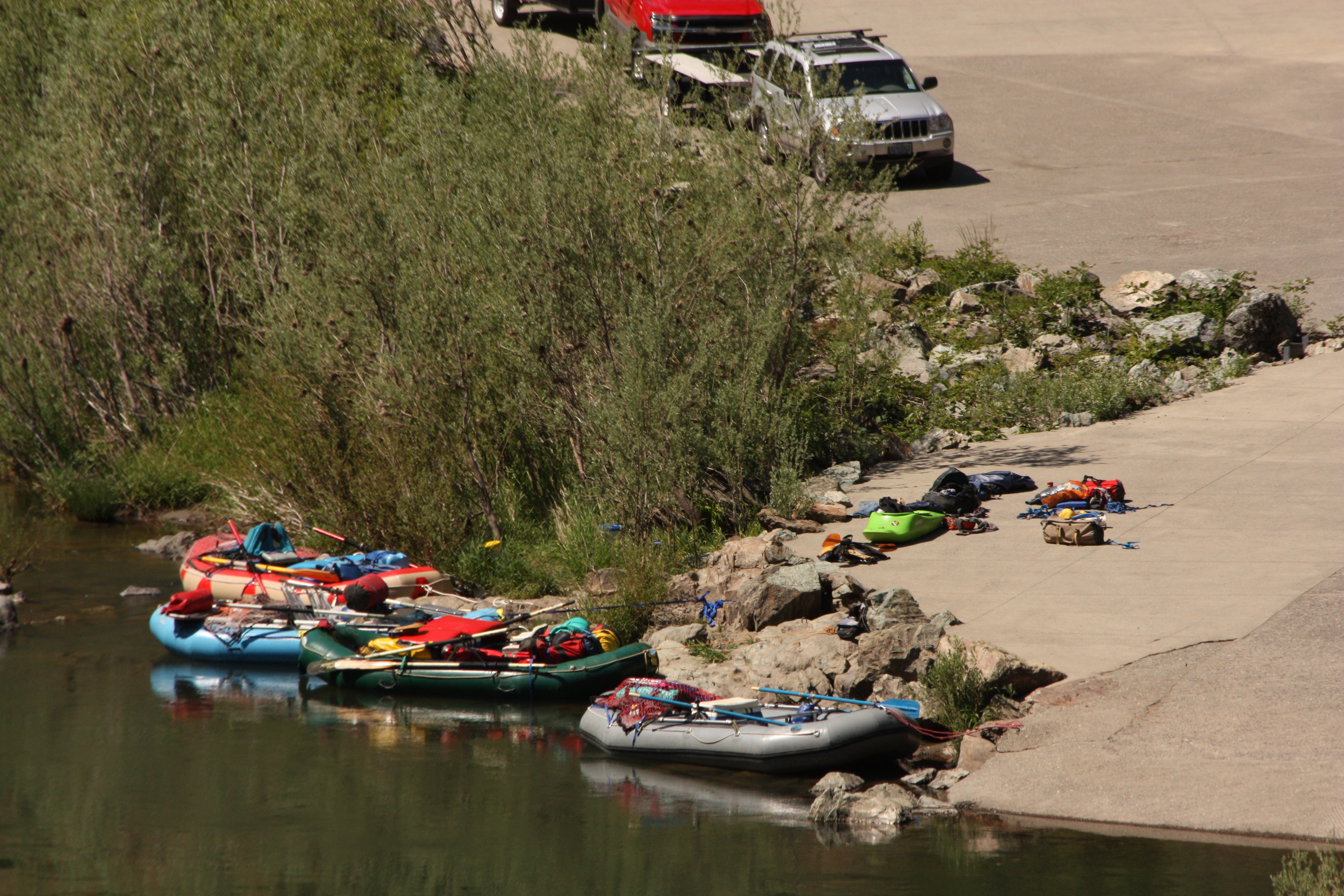
Insertion point of a rafting route (Rogue River, Oregon)

In 2004, it was estimated there were about 1,400 small rental, single-location operations in the United States. According to the 2007 United States Economic Census, 1,740 scenic and sightseeing water transportation categorized establishments reported total revenue of $1,270,714 U.S. dollars. Nearly half of that income was created by 129 businesses operating year-round and each employing 20-100+ employees. An additional 1,722 recreational goods rental categorized businesses reported total revenue of $683,457 U.S. dollars in the 2007 Economic Census of the United States. The American government industry category for a recreational boat livery is:

- SIC 7999: Amusement and Recreation Services, Not Elsewhere Classified

NAICS codes:

- 487210 Scenic and Sightseeing Transportation, Water--"Although these activities use watercraft, they are different from the activities included in water transportation. Water sightseeing does not usually involve place-to-place transportation; the passenger's trip starts and ends at the same location."
- 532292 Recreational Goods Rental.--"This U.S. industry comprises establishments primarily engaged in renting recreational goods, such as bicycles, canoes, motorcycles, skis, sailboats, beach chairs, and beach umbrellas" including providing boat rental without operators.

== See also ==
- Canoe livery
- Sports business
