= Monolayer-protected cluster molecules =

Nanoclusters

Monolayer protected clusters (MPCs) are one type of nanoparticles or clusters of atoms. A single MPC contains three main parts: metallic core, protective ligand layer and metal-ligand interface between, each defined by their distinctive chemical and structural environments. The main part of a MPC is a metallic core, which can consist of a single metal or it can be a mixture of metals. Bare metal particles tend to be reactive. They usually react with environment or with other particles making larger structures. Ligand layer is used to protect them, so that the particle size is preserved. Ligands are usually some organic molecules and they are bound to metallic core via some linking atoms such as sulfur or phosphorus forming thiol and phosphine ligands. However, there are alkynyl and carbene protected MPCs, where carbon is directly bound to metal atoms. Ligand layer can consist of a single type of ligands, like in the case of thiolate-protected gold clusters, or it can contain several different molecules. Even though the ligand layer is usually used to passivate a nanoparticle, it is not a passive part of the MPCs. For example, ligands can be functionalized to work in specific applications such as binding to surfaces or acting as a carrier for other molecules. Ligand layer also contributes to the total electronic structure of the particle, which furthermore affects the superatomic nature of the particle.

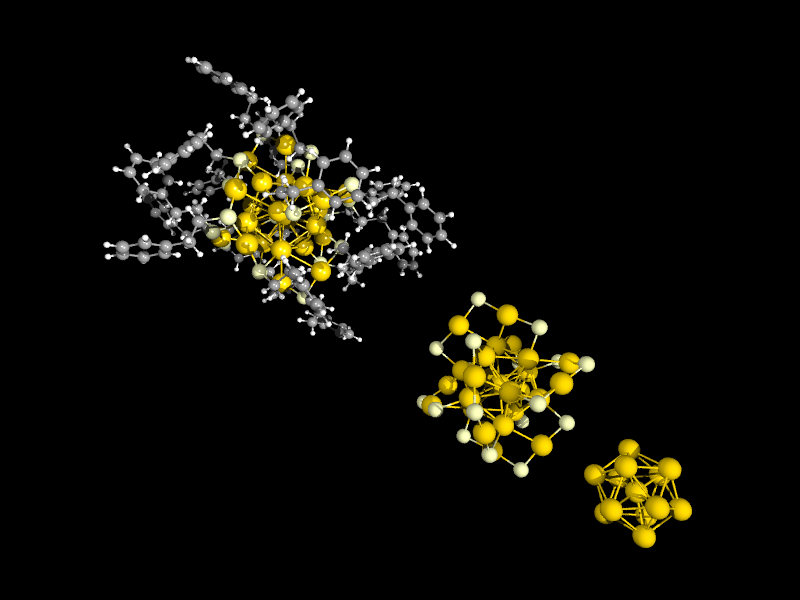
[Au_{25}(SCH_{2}Ph)_{18}]^{−} presented here is a thiolate-protected gold cluster and a classic example of the MPC, structure of which is determined by single crystal X-ray diffraction. (white: H, grey: C, dull yellow :S, yellow: Au). Top left: full structure; middle : gold core and Au-S protecting units, bottom right: Au_{13}-core.

In order to fully understand how MPCs work, one has to solve their atomic structures. One of the most common ways is to use X-ray crystallography. There are a large amount of these structures found but they are scattered over different sources. This article is designed to be a list of known structures of MPCs focusing on experimentally determined ones. MPCs are divided to tables according to their cores. Within the tables they are sorted according to the amount of metal atoms from smallest to largest. If there several clusters with similar core sizes, earlier published is listed first. The last table contains some structures which are partially determined experimentally and partially predicted by theoretical calculations. Every table lists the chemical formula of the MPC, the full reference to the publication and a their shortened DOI code with a link to the publication. There are three main ways to access the structure information. The first one is to go to the webpage of the original publication and see if there is supplementary information file containing the data. The second approach is to use the listed DOI and search the structure from the Cambridge Structural Database (CSD) or Crystallography Open Database (COD). There one can easily download the structure, if authors have submitted their crystallographic data. Some crystal structures are published in Protein Data Bank (PDB), in which case corresponding accession code is listed after the DOI. The third option is for the situations, where two first ones don't work and the data is really needed. One can check who is the corresponding author of the publication and ask politely for the data.

== Gold ==
Table of the crystal structures of gold MPCs.
Formula	References
[Au_{3}C_{27}N_{2}H_{36}]^{1+}	Robilotto, Thomas J.; Bacsa, John; Gray, Thomas G.; Sadighi, Joseph P. (2012). "Synthesis of a Trigold Monocation: An Isolobal Analogue of [H_{3}]^{+}". Angewandte Chemie International Edition. 51 (48): 12077–12080. doi:10.1002/anie.201206712. PMID 23038641.
{[(^{t}Bu)_{3}PAu]_{4}}^{2+}	Zeller, Edgar; Beruda, Holger; Schmidbaur, Hubert (1993). "Tetrahedral gold cluster [Au4]2+: Crystal structure of {[(tert-Bu)3PAu]4}2+(BF4-)2.2CHCl3". Inorganic Chemistry. 32 (15): 3203–3204. doi:10.1021/ic00067a002.
[(Au(P(mesityl)_{3})_{4}]^{2+}	Yang, Yi; Sharp, Paul R. (1994). "New Gold Clusters [Au8L6](BF4)2 and [(AuL)4](BF4)2 (L = P(mesityl)3)". Journal of the American Chemical Society. 116 (15): 6983–6984. Bibcode:1994JAChS.116.6983Y. doi:10.1021/ja00094a082.
[Au_{6}(PPh_{3})_{6}]^{2+}	Briant, Clive E.; Hall, Kevin P.; Mingos, D. Michael P.; Wheeler, Allison C. (1986). "Synthesis and structural characterisation of hexakis(triphenyl phosphine)hexagold(2+) nitrate, [Au6(PPh3)6][NO3]2, and related clusters with edgesharing bitetrahedral geometries". Journal of the Chemical Society, Dalton Transactions (3): 687. doi:10.1039/DT9860000687.
[Au_{6}P(PhCH_{3})_{3}]^{2+}	Bellon, Pierluigi; Manassero, Mario; Sansoni, Mirella (1973). "An octahedral gold cluster: Crystal and molecular structure of hexakis[tris-(p-tolyl)phosphine]-octahedro-hexagold bis(tetraphenylborate)". Journal of the Chemical Society, Dalton Transactions (22): 2423. doi:10.1039/DT9730002423.
[Au_{6}(dppp)_{4}]^{2+}	Van Der Velden, J. W. A.; Bour, J. J.; Steggerda, J. J.; Beurskens, P. T.; Roseboom, M.; Noordik, J. H. (1982). "Gold clusters. Tetrakis[1,3-bis(diphenylphosphino)propane]hexagold dinitrate: Preparation, x-ray analysis, and gold-197 Moessbauer and phosphorus-31{proton} NMR spectra". Inorganic Chemistry. 21 (12): 4321–4324. doi:10.1021/ic00142a041.
[(Im^{i}Pr_{2}·Au)_{6}(μ_{6}-C)]^{2+}	Salorinne, Kirsi; Man, Renee W. Y.; Lummis, Paul A.; Hazer, Maryam Sabooni Asre; Malola, Sami; Yim, Jacky C.-H.; Veinot, Alex J.; Zhou, Wenxia; Häkkinen, Hannu; Nambo, Masakazu; Crudden, Cathleen M. (2020). "Synthesis and properties of an Au_{6} cluster supported by a mixed N-heterocyclic carbene–thiolate ligand". Chemical Communications. 56 (45): 6102–6105. doi:10.1039/D0CC01482F. PMID 32355943.
[Au_{7}(PPh_{3})_{7}]^{1+}	Van Der Velden, J. W. A.; Beurskens, P. T.; Bour, J. J.; Bosman, W. P.; Noordik, J. H.; Kolenbrander, M.; Buskes, J. A. K. M. (1984). "Intermediates in the formation of gold clusters. Preparation and x-ray analysis of [Au7(PPh3)7]+ and synthesis and characterization of [Au8(PPh3)6I]PF6". Inorganic Chemistry. 23 (2): 146–151. doi:10.1021/ic00170a007.
[Au_{7}(dppp)_{4}]^{3+}	Shichibu, Yukatsu; Zhang, Mingzhe; Kamei, Yutaro; Konishi, Katsuaki (2014). "[Au_{7}]^{3+}: A Missing Link in the Four-Electron Gold Cluster Family". Journal of the American Chemical Society. 136 (37): 12892–12895. Bibcode:2014JAChS.13612892S. doi:10.1021/ja508005x. PMID 25184446.
[Au_{8}(PPh_{3})_{8}]^{2+}	Manassero, Mario; Naldini, Luciana; Sansoni, Mirella (1979). "A new class of gold cluster compounds. Synthesis and X-ray structure of the octakis(triphenylphosphinegold) dializarinsulphonate, [Au8(PPh3)8](aliz)2". Journal of the Chemical Society, Chemical Communications (9): 385. doi:10.1039/C39790000385.
[Au_{8}(PPh_{3})_{7}]^{2+}	Van Der Velden, Jan W. A.; Bour, Jan J.; Bosman, Wil P.; Noordik, Jan H. (1981). "Synthesis and X-ray crystal structure determination of the cationic gold cluster compound [Au8(PPh3)7](NO3)2". Journal of the Chemical Society, Chemical Communications (23): 1218. doi:10.1039/C39810001218.
[Au_{8}(PPh_{3})_{7}(SnCl_{3})]^{+}	Demidowicz, Zenon; Johnston, Roy L.; Machell, Jonathan C.; Mingos, D. Michael P.; Williams, Ian D. (1988). "Synthesis and structural characterisation of a novel high-nuclearity gold–tin cluster compound, [Au_{8}(PPH_{3})_{7}(SNCL_{3})]_{2}[SNCL_{6}]". J. Chem. Soc., Dalton Trans. (7): 1751–1756. doi:10.1039/DT9880001751.
[Au_{8}L_{6}]^{1+}	Yang, Yi; Sharp, Paul R. (1994). "New Gold Clusters [Au8L6](BF4)2 and [(AuL)4](BF4)2 (L = P(mesityl)3)". Journal of the American Chemical Society. 116 (15): 6983–6984. Bibcode:1994JAChS.116.6983Y. doi:10.1021/ja00094a082.
[Au_{8}(dppp)_{4}]^{2+}	Kamei, Yutaro; Shichibu, Yukatsu; Konishi, Katsuaki (2011). "Generation of Small Gold Clusters with Unique Geometries through Cluster-to-Cluster Transformations: Octanuclear Clusters with Edge-sharing Gold Tetrahedron Motifs". Angewandte Chemie International Edition. 50 (32): 7442–7445. doi:10.1002/anie.201102901. PMID 21688379.
[Au_{8}(dppp)_{4}Cl_{2}]^{2+}	Kamei, Yutaro; Shichibu, Yukatsu; Konishi, Katsuaki (2011). "Generation of Small Gold Clusters with Unique Geometries through Cluster-to-Cluster Transformations: Octanuclear Clusters with Edge-sharing Gold Tetrahedron Motifs". Angewandte Chemie International Edition. 50 (32): 7442–7445. doi:10.1002/anie.201102901. PMID 21688379.
[Au_{8}(dppp)_{4}(CCPh)_{2}]^{2+}	Kobayashi, Naoki; Kamei, Yutaro; Shichibu, Yukatsu; Konishi, Katsuaki (2013). "Protonation-Induced Chromism of Pyridylethynyl-Appended [core+ exo ]-Type Au_{8} Clusters. Resonance-Coupled Electronic Perturbation through π-Conjugated Group". Journal of the American Chemical Society. 135 (43): 16078–16081. Bibcode:2013JAChS.13516078K. doi:10.1021/ja4099092. PMID 24127776.
[Au_{8}(dppm)_{4}S_{2}]^{2+}	Zhang, Shan-Shan; Feng, Lei; Senanayake, Ravithree D.; Aikens, Christine M.; Wang, Xing-Po; Zhao, Quan-Qin; Tung, Chen-Ho; Sun, Di (2018). "Diphosphine-protected ultrasmall gold nanoclusters: Opened icosahedral Au_{13}and heart-shaped Au_{8}clusters". Chemical Science. 9 (5): 1251–1258. doi:10.1039/C7SC03566G. PMC 5885941. PMID 29675171.
[Au_{8}(dppp)_{4}(C_{4}Ph)_{2}]^{2+}	Iwasaki, Mitsuhiro; Shichibu, Yukatsu; Konishi, Katsuaki (2019). "Unusual Attractive Au–π Interactions in Small Diacetylene-Modified Gold Clusters". Angewandte Chemie International Edition. 58 (8): 2443–2447. doi:10.1002/anie.201814359. PMID 30614159.
[Au_{8}(dppp)_{4}(C_{2}(CH_{2})_{2}CH_{3})_{2}]^{2+}	Iwasaki, Mitsuhiro; Shichibu, Yukatsu; Konishi, Katsuaki (2019). "Unusual Attractive Au–π Interactions in Small Diacetylene-Modified Gold Clusters". Angewandte Chemie International Edition. 58 (8): 2443–2447. doi:10.1002/anie.201814359. PMID 30614159.
Au_{8}(DPPF)_{4}	Li, Shuo Hao; Liu, Xu; Hu, Weigang; Chen, Mingyang; Zhu, Yan (2020). "An Au_{8} Cluster Fortified by Four Ferrocenes". The Journal of Physical Chemistry A. 124 (29): 6061–6067. Bibcode:2020JPCA..124.6061L. doi:10.1021/acs.jpca.0c03366. PMID 32639744.
[Au_{9}{P(p-C_{6}H_{4}Me)_{3}}_{8}]^{3+}	Bellon, P. L.; Cariati, F.; Manassero, M.; Naldini, L.; Sansoni, M. (1971). "Novel gold clusters. Preparation, properties, and X-ray structure determination of salts of octakis(triarylphosphine)enneagold, [Au9L8]X3". Journal of the Chemical Society D: Chemical Communications (22): 1423. doi:10.1039/C29710001423.
[Au_{9}{P(p-C_{6}H_{4}OMe)_{3}}_{8}]^{3+}	Hall, Kevin P.; Theoblad, Brain R. C.; Gilmour, David I.; Mingos, D. Michael P.; Welch, Alan J. (1982). "Synthesis and structural characterization of [Au9{P(p-C6H4OMe)3}8](BF4)3; a cluster with a centred crown of gold atoms". Journal of the Chemical Society, Chemical Communications (10): 528. doi:10.1039/C39820000528.
[Au_{9}{P(p-C_{6}H_{4}OMe)_{3}}_{8}]^{3+}	Briant, Clive E.; Hall, Kevin P.; Mingos, D. Michael P. (1984). "Structural characterisation of two crystalline modifications of [Au9{P(C6H4OMe-p)3}8](NO3)3: The first example of skeletal isomerism in metal cluster chemistry". Journal of the Chemical Society, Chemical Communications (5): 290. doi:10.1039/C39840000290.
[Au_{9}(PPh_{3})_{8}]^{3+}	Schulz-Dobrick, Martin; Jansen, Martin (2006). "Supramolecular Intercluster Compounds Consisting of Gold Clusters and Keggin Anions". European Journal of Inorganic Chemistry. 2006 (22): 4498–4502. doi:10.1002/ejic.200600790.
[Au_{9}(PPh_{3})_{8}]^{3+}	Schulz-Dobrick, Martin; Jansen, Martin (2007). "Structure-Directing Effects in the Supramolecular Intercluster Compound [Au_{9}(PPH_{3})_{8}]_{2}[V_{10}O_{28}H_{3}]_{2}: Long-Range versus Short-Range Bonding Interactions". Inorganic Chemistry. 46 (11): 4380–4382. doi:10.1021/ic700434x. PMID 17477525.
[Au_{9}(PPh_{3})_{8}]^{3+}	Wen, Fei; Englert, Ulli; Gutrath, Benjamin; Simon, Ulrich (2008). "Crystal Structure, Electrochemical and Optical Properties of [Au_{9}(PPH_{3})_{8}](NO_{3})_{3}". European Journal of Inorganic Chemistry. 2008: 106–111. doi:10.1002/ejic.200700534.
[Au_{10}Cl_{3}(PCy_{2}Ph)_{6}]^{+}	Briant, Clive E.; Hall, Kevin P.; Wheeler, Alison C.; Mingos, D. Michael P. (1984). "Structural characterisation of [Au10Cl3(PCy2Ph)6](NO3)(Cy = cyclohexyl) and the development of a structural principle for high nuclearity gold clusters". Journal of the Chemical Society, Chemical Communications (4): 248. doi:10.1039/C39840000248.
[Au_{10}(μ-cis-dppee)_{4}(μ_{3}-S)_{4}]^{2+}	Yao, Liao-Yuan; Yam, Vivian Wing-Wah (2015). "Photoinduced Isomerization-Driven Structural Transformation Between Decanuclear and Octadecanuclear Gold(I) Sulfido Clusters". Journal of the American Chemical Society. 137 (10): 3506–3509. Bibcode:2015JAChS.137.3506Y. doi:10.1021/jacs.5b01676. PMID 25741572.
[Au_{10}(bisNHC)_{4}Br_{2}]^{2+}	Man, Renee W. Y.; Yi, Hong; Malola, Sami; Takano, Shinjiro; Tsukuda, Tatsuya; Häkkinen, Hannu; Nambo, Masakazu; Crudden, Cathleen M. (2022). "Synthesis and Characterization of Enantiopure Chiral Bis NHC-Stabilized Edge-Shared Au_{10} Nanocluster with Unique Prolate Shape". Journal of the American Chemical Society. 144 (5): 2056–2061. Bibcode:2022JAChS.144.2056M. doi:10.1021/jacs.1c11857. PMID 35100506.
[Au_{10}(^{MesCH2}Bimy)_{6}Br_{3}]^{+}	Lummis, Paul A.; Osten, Kimberly M.; Levchenko, Tetyana I.; Sabooni Asre Hazer, Maryam; Malola, Sami; Owens-Baird, Bryan; Veinot, Alex J.; Albright, Emily L.; Schatte, Gabriele; Takano, Shinjiro; Kovnir, Kirill; Stamplecoskie, Kevin G.; Tsukuda, Tatsuya; Häkkinen, Hannu; Nambo, Masakazu; Crudden, Cathleen M. (2022). "NHC-Stabilized Au_{10} Nanoclusters and Their Conversion to Au_{25} Nanoclusters". JACS Au. 2 (4): 875–885. doi:10.1021/jacsau.2c00004. PMC 9088291. PMID 35557749.
Au_{11}(S-4-NC_{5}-H_{4})_{3}(PPh_{3})_{7}	Nunokawa, Keiko; Onaka, Satoru; Ito, Mitsuhiro; Horibe, Makoto; Yonezawa, Tetsu; Nishihara, Hiroshi; Ozeki, Tomoji; Chiba, Hirokazu; Watase, Seiji; Nakamoto, Masami (2006). "Synthesis, single crystal X-ray analysis, and TEM for a single-sized Au11 cluster stabilized by SR ligands: The interface between molecules and particles". Journal of Organometallic Chemistry. 691 (4): 638–642. doi:10.1016/j.jorganchem.2005.09.043.
[Au_{11}(Ph_{2}P(CH_{2})_{2}PPh_{2})_{6}]^{3+}	Shichibu, Yukatsu; Kamei, Yutaro; Konishi, Katsuaki (2012). "Unique [core+two] structure and optical property of a dodeca-ligated undecagold cluster: Critical contribution of the exo gold atoms to the electronic structure". Chemical Communications. 48 (61): 7559–7561. doi:10.1039/C2CC30251A. hdl:2115/52107. PMID 22430877.
Au_{11}(PPh_{3})_{7}Cl_{3}	McKenzie, Lallie C.; Zaikova, Tatiana O.; Hutchison, James E. (2014). "Structurally Similar Triphenylphosphine-Stabilized Undecagolds, Au_{11}(PPH_{3})_{7}Cl_{3} and [Au_{11}(PPH_{3})_{8}Cl_{2}]Cl, Exhibit Distinct Ligand Exchange Pathways with Glutathione". Journal of the American Chemical Society. 136 (38): 13426–13435. Bibcode:2014JAChS.13613426M. doi:10.1021/ja5075689. PMC 4183609. PMID 25171178.
[Au_{11}(PPh_{3})_{8}Cl_{2}]^{+}	McKenzie, Lallie C.; Zaikova, Tatiana O.; Hutchison, James E. (2014). "Structurally Similar Triphenylphosphine-Stabilized Undecagolds, Au_{11}(PPH_{3})_{7}Cl_{3} and [Au_{11}(PPH_{3})_{8}Cl_{2}]Cl, Exhibit Distinct Ligand Exchange Pathways with Glutathione". Journal of the American Chemical Society. 136 (38): 13426–13435. Bibcode:2014JAChS.13613426M. doi:10.1021/ja5075689. PMC 4183609. PMID 25171178.
[Au_{11}(PPh_{3})_{7}(NHC^{i-Pr})Cl_{2}]^{+}	Narouz, Mina R.; Osten, Kimberly M.; Unsworth, Phillip J.; Man, Renee W. Y.; Salorinne, Kirsi; Takano, Shinjiro; Tomihara, Ryohei; Kaappa, Sami; Malola, Sami; Dinh, Cao-Thang; Padmos, J. Daniel; Ayoo, Kennedy; Garrett, Patrick J.; Nambo, Masakazu; Horton, J. Hugh; Sargent, Edward H.; Häkkinen, Hannu; Tsukuda, Tatsuya; Crudden, Cathleen M. (2019). "N-heterocyclic carbene-functionalized magic-number gold nanoclusters". Nature Chemistry. 11 (5): 419–425. Bibcode:2019NatCh..11..419N. doi:10.1038/s41557-019-0246-5. hdl:1807/94771. PMID 30988416.
[Au_{12}(PPh_{2})_{2}S_{4}(L2)_{4}]^{2+}	Yu, Wen; Wang, Yingxia; Fuhr, Olaf; Fenske, Dieter; Dehnen, Stefanie (2018). "[Au_{12}(PPH_{2})_{2}S_{4}(L2)_{4}]^{2+} (L2 = 3,4-bis(diphenylphosphino)-2,5-bis(trimethylsilyloxy)furan): An Au_{12} unit protected by modified maleic anhydride phosphine ligands". Dalton Transactions. 47 (4): 1032–1035. doi:10.1039/C7DT04263A. PMID 29292447.
[Au_{13}(PMe_{2}Ph)_{10}Cl_{2}]^{3+}	Briant, Clive E.; Theobald, Brian R. C.; White, James W.; Bell, Linda K.; Mingos, D. Michael P.; Welch, Alan J. (1981). "Synthesis and X-ray structural characterization of the centred icosahedral gold cluster compound [Aul3(PMe2Ph)10Cl2](PF6)3; the realization of a theoretical prediction". Journal of the Chemical Society, Chemical Communications (5): 201. doi:10.1039/C39810000201.
[Au_{13}(dppe)_{5}Cl_{2}]^{3+}	Shichibu, Yukatsu; Konishi, Katsuaki (2010). "HCL-Induced Nuclearity Convergence in Diphosphine-Protected Ultrasmall Gold Clusters: A Novel Synthetic Route to "Magic-Number" Au_{13} Clusters". Small. 6 (11): 1216–1220. doi:10.1002/smll.200902398. PMID 20486140.
[Au_{13}(dppe)_{5}(CCPh)_{2}]^{3+}	Sugiuchi, Mizuho; Shichibu, Yukatsu; Nakanishi, Takayuki; Hasegawa, Yasuchika; Konishi, Katsuaki (2015). "Cluster–π electronic interaction in a superatomic Au_{13} cluster bearing σ-bonded acetylide ligands". Chemical Communications. 51 (70): 13519–13522. doi:10.1039/C5CC04312C. hdl:2115/62372. PMID 26215256.
[Au_{13}(dppm)_{6}]^{5+}	Zhang, Shan-Shan; Feng, Lei; Senanayake, Ravithree D.; Aikens, Christine M.; Wang, Xing-Po; Zhao, Quan-Qin; Tung, Chen-Ho; Sun, Di (2018). "Diphosphine-protected ultrasmall gold nanoclusters: Opened icosahedral Au_{13}and heart-shaped Au_{8}clusters". Chemical Science. 9 (5): 1251–1258. doi:10.1039/C7SC03566G. PMC 5885941. PMID 29675171.
[Au_{13}(NHC^{Bn})_{9}Cl_{3}]^{2+}	Narouz, Mina R.; Takano, Shinjiro; Lummis, Paul A.; Levchenko, Tetyana I.; Nazemi, Ali; Kaappa, Sami; Malola, Sami; Yousefalizadeh, Goonay; Calhoun, Larry A.; Stamplecoskie, Kevin G.; Häkkinen, Hannu; Tsukuda, Tatsuya; Crudden, Cathleen M. (2019). "Robust, Highly Luminescent Au_{13} Superatoms Protected by N-Heterocyclic Carbenes". Journal of the American Chemical Society. 141 (38): 14997–15002. Bibcode:2019JAChS.14114997N. doi:10.1021/jacs.9b07854. PMID 31497943.
[Au_{13}(NHC-1)_{6}Br_{6}]^{−}	Shen, Hui; Xiang, Sijin; Xu, Zhen; Liu, Chen; Li, Xihua; Sun, Cunfa; Lin, Shuichao; Teo, Boon K.; Zheng, Nanfeng (2020). "Superatomic Au13 clusters ligated by different N-heterocyclic carbenes and their ligand-dependent catalysis, photoluminescence, and proton sensitivity". Nano Research. 13 (7): 1908–1911. doi:10.1007/s12274-020-2685-0.
[Au_{13}(NHC-2)_{5}Br_{2}]^{3+}	Shen, Hui; Xiang, Sijin; Xu, Zhen; Liu, Chen; Li, Xihua; Sun, Cunfa; Lin, Shuichao; Teo, Boon K.; Zheng, Nanfeng (2020). "Superatomic Au13 clusters ligated by different N-heterocyclic carbenes and their ligand-dependent catalysis, photoluminescence, and proton sensitivity". Nano Research. 13 (7): 1908–1911. doi:10.1007/s12274-020-2685-0.
[Au_{13}(NHC-3)_{9}Cl_{3}]^{2+}	Shen, Hui; Xiang, Sijin; Xu, Zhen; Liu, Chen; Li, Xihua; Sun, Cunfa; Lin, Shuichao; Teo, Boon K.; Zheng, Nanfeng (2020). "Superatomic Au13 clusters ligated by different N-heterocyclic carbenes and their ligand-dependent catalysis, photoluminescence, and proton sensitivity". Nano Research. 13 (7): 1908–1911. doi:10.1007/s12274-020-2685-0.
[Au_{13}(NHC-4)_{8}(ArC≡C)_{4}]^{+}	Shen, Hui; Wu, Qingyuan; Malola, Sami; Han, Ying-Zi; Xu, Zhen; Qin, Ruixuan; Tang, Xiongkai; Chen, Yang-Bo; Teo, Boon K.; Häkkinen, Hannu; Zheng, Nanfeng (2022). "N-Heterocyclic Carbene-Stabilized Gold Nanoclusters with Organometallic Motifs for Promoting Catalysis". Journal of the American Chemical Society. 144 (24): 10844–10853. Bibcode:2022JAChS.14410844S. doi:10.1021/jacs.2c02669. PMID 35671335.
Au_{14}(PPh_{3})_{8}(NO_{3})_{4}	Gutrath, Benjamin S.; Oppel, Iris M.; Presly, Oliver; Beljakov, Igor; Meded, Velimir; Wenzel, Wolfgang; Simon, Ulrich (2013). "[Au_{14}(PPH_{3})_{8}(NO_{3})_{4}]: An Example of a New Class of Au(NO_{3})-Ligated Superatom Complexes". Angewandte Chemie International Edition. 52 (12): 3529–3532. doi:10.1002/anie.201208681. PMID 23420716.
[Au_{16}(NHC-1)_{5}(PA)_{3}Br_{2}]^{3+}	Shen, Hui; Wu, Qingyuan; Malola, Sami; Han, Ying-Zi; Xu, Zhen; Qin, Ruixuan; Tang, Xiongkai; Chen, Yang-Bo; Teo, Boon K.; Häkkinen, Hannu; Zheng, Nanfeng (2022). "N-Heterocyclic Carbene-Stabilized Gold Nanoclusters with Organometallic Motifs for Promoting Catalysis". Journal of the American Chemical Society. 144 (24): 10844–10853. Bibcode:2022JAChS.14410844S. doi:10.1021/jacs.2c02669. PMID 35671335.
[Au_{16}(NHC-1)_{5}(PA)_{2}(4-MePhC≡C)Br_{2}]^{3+}	Shen, Hui; Wu, Qingyuan; Malola, Sami; Han, Ying-Zi; Xu, Zhen; Qin, Ruixuan; Tang, Xiongkai; Chen, Yang-Bo; Teo, Boon K.; Häkkinen, Hannu; Zheng, Nanfeng (2022). "N-Heterocyclic Carbene-Stabilized Gold Nanoclusters with Organometallic Motifs for Promoting Catalysis". Journal of the American Chemical Society. 144 (24): 10844–10853. Bibcode:2022JAChS.14410844S. doi:10.1021/jacs.2c02669. PMID 35671335.
[Au_{17}(NHC-1)_{4}(PA)_{4}Br_{4}]^{+}	Shen, Hui; Wu, Qingyuan; Malola, Sami; Han, Ying-Zi; Xu, Zhen; Qin, Ruixuan; Tang, Xiongkai; Chen, Yang-Bo; Teo, Boon K.; Häkkinen, Hannu; Zheng, Nanfeng (2022). "N-Heterocyclic Carbene-Stabilized Gold Nanoclusters with Organometallic Motifs for Promoting Catalysis". Journal of the American Chemical Society. 144 (24): 10844–10853. Bibcode:2022JAChS.14410844S. doi:10.1021/jacs.2c02669. PMID 35671335.
[Au_{18}(μ-trans-dppee)_{6}(μ_{3}-S)_{8}]^{2+}	Yao, Liao-Yuan; Yam, Vivian Wing-Wah (2015). "Photoinduced Isomerization-Driven Structural Transformation Between Decanuclear and Octadecanuclear Gold(I) Sulfido Clusters". Journal of the American Chemical Society. 137 (10): 3506–3509. Bibcode:2015JAChS.137.3506Y. doi:10.1021/jacs.5b01676. PMID 25741572.
Au_{18}(SC_{6}H_{11})_{14}	Das, Anindita; Liu, Chong; Byun, Hee Young; Nobusada, Katsuyuki; Zhao, Shuo; Rosi, Nathaniel; Jin, Rongchao (2015). "Structure Determination of [Au_{18}(SR)_{14}]". Angewandte Chemie International Edition. 54 (10): 3140–3144. doi:10.1002/anie.201410161. PMID 25619892.
Au_{18}(SC_{6}H_{11})_{14}	Chen, Shuang; Wang, Shuxin; Zhong, Juan; Song, Yongbo; Zhang, Jun; Sheng, Hongting; Pei, Yong; Zhu, Manzhou (2015). "The Structure and Optical Properties of the [Au_{18}(SR)_{14}] Nanocluster". Angewandte Chemie International Edition. 54 (10): 3145–3149. doi:10.1002/anie.201410295. PMID 25620108.
[Au_{18}S_{8}(dppe)_{6}]^{2+}	Keter, Frankline K.; Guzei, Ilia A.; Nell, Margo; Zyl, Werner E. van; Darkwa, James (2014). "Phosphinogold(I) Dithiocarbamate Complexes: Effect of the Nature of Phosphine Ligand on Anticancer Properties". Inorganic Chemistry. 53 (4): 2058–2067. doi:10.1021/ic4025926. PMC 3993921. PMID 24476103.
[Au_{18}(dppm)_{6}Cl_{4}]^{4+}	Zhang, Shan-Shan; Senanayake, Ravithree D.; Zhao, Quan-Qin; Su, Hai-Feng; Aikens, Christine M.; Wang, Xing-Po; Tung, Chen-Ho; Sun, Di; Zheng, Lan-Sun (2019). "[Au_{18}(DPPM)_{6}Cl_{4}]^{4+}: A phosphine-protected gold nanocluster with rich charge states". Dalton Transactions. 48 (11): 3635–3640. doi:10.1039/C9DT00042A. PMID 30747941.
[Au_{19}(CCPh)_{9}(Hdppa)_{3}]^{2+}	Wan, Xian-Kai; Tang, Qing; Yuan, Shang-Fu; Jiang, De-en; Wang, Quan-Ming (2015). "Au_{19} Nanocluster Featuring a V-Shaped Alkynyl–Gold Motif". Journal of the American Chemical Society. 137 (2): 652–655. Bibcode:2015JAChS.137..652W. doi:10.1021/ja512133a. PMID 25545109.
[Au_{20}(PPhpy_{2})_{10}Cl_{4}]^{2+}	Wan, Xian-Kai; Lin, Zhi-Wei; Wang, Quan-Ming (2012). "Au_{20} Nanocluster Protected by Hemilabile Phosphines". Journal of the American Chemical Society. 134 (36): 14750–14752. Bibcode:2012JAChS.13414750W. doi:10.1021/ja307256b. PMID 22931402.
Au_{20}(TBBT)_{16}	Zeng, Chenjie; Liu, Chong; Chen, Yuxiang; Rosi, Nathaniel L.; Jin, Rongchao (2014). "Gold–Thiolate Ring as a Protecting Motif in the Au_{20}(SR)_{16} Nanocluster and Implications". Journal of the American Chemical Society. 136 (34): 11922–11925. Bibcode:2014JAChS.13611922Z. doi:10.1021/ja506802n. PMID 25126666.
[Au_{20}(PP_{3})_{4}]^{4+}	Chen, Jing; Zhang, Qian-Fan; Williard, Paul G.; Wang, Lai-Sheng (2014). "Synthesis and Structure Determination of a New Au_{20} Nanocluster Protected by Tripodal Tetraphosphine Ligands". Inorganic Chemistry. 53 (8): 3932–3934. doi:10.1021/ic500562r. PMID 24684605.
Au_{21}(S-tBu)_{15}	Yang, Sha; Chai, Jinsong; Song, Yongbo; Fan, Jiqiang; Chen, Tao; Wang, Shuxin; Yu, Haizhu; Li, Xiaowu; Zhu, Manzhou (2017). "In Situ Two-Phase Ligand Exchange: A New Method for the Synthesis of Alloy Nanoclusters with Precise Atomic Structures". Journal of the American Chemical Society. 139 (16): 5668–5671. Bibcode:2017JAChS.139.5668Y. doi:10.1021/jacs.7b00668. PMID 28383901.
Au_{21}(S-Adm)_{15}	Chen, Shuang; Xiong, Lin; Wang, Shuxin; Ma, Zhongyun; Jin, Shan; Sheng, Hongting; Pei, Yong; Zhu, Manzhou (2016). "Total Structure Determination of Au_{21}(S-Adm)_{15} and Geometrical/Electronic Structure Evolution of Thiolated Gold Nanoclusters". Journal of the American Chemical Society. 138 (34): 10754–10757. Bibcode:2016JAChS.13810754C. doi:10.1021/jacs.6b06004. PMID 27552520.
Au_{22}(L^{8})_{6}	Chen, Jing; Zhang, Qian-Fan; Bonaccorso, Timary A.; Williard, Paul G.; Wang, Lai-Sheng (2014). "Controlling Gold Nanoclusters by Diphospine Ligands". Journal of the American Chemical Society. 136 (1): 92–95. Bibcode:2014JAChS.136...92C. doi:10.1021/ja411061e. PMID 24351099.
Au_{22}(SAdm)_{16}	Li, Yingwei; Cowan, Michael J.; Zhou, Meng; Luo, Tian-Yi; Song, Yongbo; Wang, He; Rosi, Nathaniel L.; Mpourmpakis, Giannis; Jin, Rongchao (2020). "Atom-by-Atom Evolution of the Same Ligand-Protected Au_{21}, Au_{22}, Au_{22}Cd_{1}, and Au_{24} Nanocluster Series". Journal of the American Chemical Society. 142 (48): 20426–20433. Bibcode:2020JAChS.14220426L. doi:10.1021/jacs.0c09110. PMID 33170677.
[Au_{23}(SC_{6}H_{11})_{16}]^{−}	Das, Anindita; Li, Tao; Nobusada, Katsuyuki; Zeng, Chenjie; Rosi, Nathaniel L.; Jin, Rongchao (2013). "Nonsuperatomic [Au_{23}(SC_{6}H_{11})_{16}]^{−} Nanocluster Featuring Bipyramidal Au_{15} Kernel and Trimeric Au_{3}(SR)_{4} Motif". Journal of the American Chemical Society. 135 (49): 18264–18267. doi:10.1021/ja409177s. PMID 24274138.
[Au_{23}(CCPh)_{9}(PPh_{3})_{6}]^{2+}	Wan, Xian-Kai; Yuan, Shang-Fu; Tang, Qing; Jiang, De-en; Wang, Quan-Ming (2015). "Alkynyl-Protected Au_{23} Nanocluster: A 12-Electron System". Angewandte Chemie International Edition. 54 (20): 5977–5980. doi:10.1002/anie.201500590. PMID 25808199.
Au_{23}(CCBu)_{15}	Guan, Zong-Jie; Hu, Feng; Li, Jiao-Jiao; Wen, Zhao-Rui; Lin, Yu-Mei; Wang, Quan-Ming (2020). "Isomerization in Alkynyl-Protected Gold Nanoclusters". Journal of the American Chemical Society. 142 (6): 2995–3001. Bibcode:2020JAChS.142.2995G. doi:10.1021/jacs.9b11836. PMID 31958012.
[Au_{23}(NHC^{ptol})_{6}(C≡CPh)_{9}]^{2+}	Hirano, Koto; Takano, Shinjiro; Tsukuda, Tatsuya (2021). "Ligand Effects on the Structures of [Au_{23}L_{6}(C≡CPH)_{9}]^{2+} (L = N-Heterocyclic Carbene vs Phosphine) with Au_{17} Superatomic Cores". The Journal of Physical Chemistry C. 125 (18): 9930–9936. doi:10.1021/acs.jpcc.1c02197.
[Au_{24}(CCPh)_{14}(PPh_{3})_{4}]^{2+}	Wan, Xian-Kai; Xu, Wen Wu; Yuan, Shang-Fu; Gao, Yi; Zeng, Xiao-Cheng; Wang, Quan-Ming (2015). "A Near-Infrared-Emissive Alkynyl-Protected Au_{24} Nanocluster". Angewandte Chemie International Edition. 54 (33): 9683–9686. doi:10.1002/anie.201503893. PMID 26119538.
Au_{24}(SAdm)_{16}	Crasto, David; Barcaro, Giovanni; Stener, Mauro; Sementa, Luca; Fortunelli, Alessandro; Dass, Amala (2014). "Au_{24}(SAdm)_{16} Nanomolecules: X-ray Crystal Structure, Theoretical Analysis, Adaptability of Adamantane Ligands to Form Au_{23}(SAdm)_{16} and Au_{25}(SAdm)_{16}, and Its Relation to Au_{25}(SR)_{18}". Journal of the American Chemical Society. 136 (42): 14933–14940. Bibcode:2014JAChS.13614933C. doi:10.1021/ja507738e. PMID 25308728.
Au_{24}(SCH_{2}Ph-tBu)_{20}	Das, Anindita; Li, Tao; Li, Gao; Nobusada, Katsuyuki; Zeng, Chenjie; Rosi, Nathaniel L.; Jin, Rongchao (2014). "Crystal structure and electronic properties of a thiolate-protected Au24 nanocluster". Nanoscale. 6 (12): 6458–6462. doi:10.1039/C4NR01350F. PMID 24817094.
[Au_{24}L_{6}Cl_{4}]^{2+}	Sugiuchi, Mizuho; Shichibu, Yukatsu; Konishi, Katsuaki (2018). "An Inherently Chiral Au_{24} Framework with Double-Helical Hexagold Strands". Angewandte Chemie International Edition. 57 (26): 7855–7859. doi:10.1002/anie.201804087. PMID 29719106.
[Au_{24}(PPh_{3})_{10}(SC_{2}H_{4}Ph)_{5}Cl_{2}]^{+}	Das, Anindita; Li, Tao; Nobusada, Katsuyuki; Zeng, Qiong; Rosi, Nathaniel L.; Jin, Rongchao (2012). "Total Structure and Optical Properties of a Phosphine/Thiolate-Protected Au_{24} Nanocluster". Journal of the American Chemical Society. 134 (50): 20286–20289. Bibcode:2012JAChS.13420286D. doi:10.1021/ja3101566. PMID 23227995.
[Au_{24}(NHC)_{14}Cl_{2}H_{3}]^{3+}	Kulkarni, Viveka K.; Khiarak, Behnam Nourmohammadi; Takano, Shinjiro; Malola, Sami; Albright, Emily L.; Levchenko, Tetyana I.; Aloisio, Mark D.; Dinh, Cao-Thang; Tsukuda, Tatsuya; Häkkinen, Hannu; Crudden, Cathleen M. (2022). "N-Heterocyclic Carbene-Stabilized Hydrido Au_{24} Nanoclusters: Synthesis, Structure, and Electrocatalytic Reduction of CO_{2}". Journal of the American Chemical Society. 144 (20): 9000–9006. Bibcode:2022JAChS.144.9000K. doi:10.1021/jacs.2c00789. PMID 35549258.
[Au_{25}(PPh_{3})_{10}(SEt)_{5}Cl_{2}]^{2+}	Shichibu, Yukatsu; Konishi, Katsuaki (2010). "HCL-Induced Nuclearity Convergence in Diphosphine-Protected Ultrasmall Gold Clusters: A Novel Synthetic Route to "Magic-Number" Au_{13} Clusters". Small. 6 (11): 1216–1220. doi:10.1002/smll.200902398. PMID 20486140.
[Au_{25}(SC_{2}H_{4}Ph)_{18}]^{1-}	Zhu, Manzhou; Aikens, Christine M.; Hollander, Frederick J.; Schatz, George C.; Jin, Rongchao (2008). "Correlating the Crystal Structure of a Thiol-Protected Au_{25} Cluster and Optical Properties". Journal of the American Chemical Society. 130 (18): 5883–5885. Bibcode:2008JAChS.130.5883Z. doi:10.1021/ja801173r. PMID 18407639.
[Au_{25}(SC_{2}H_{4}Ph)_{18}]^{1-}	Heaven, Michael W.; Dass, Amala; White, Peter S.; Holt, Kennedy M.; Murray, Royce W. (2008). "Crystal Structure of the Gold Nanoparticle [N(C_{8}H_{17})_{4}][Au_{25}(SCH_{2}CH_{2}Ph)_{18}]". Journal of the American Chemical Society. 130 (12): 3754–3755. Bibcode:2008JAChS.130.3754H. doi:10.1021/ja800561b. PMID 18321116.
[Au_{25}(SC_{2}H_{4}Ph)_{18}]^{1-}	Zhu, Manzhou; Eckenhoff, William T.; Pintauer, Tomislav; Jin, Rongchao (2008). "Conversion of Anionic [Au_{25}(SCH_{2}CH_{2}Ph)_{18}]^{−} Cluster to Charge Neutral Cluster via Air Oxidation". The Journal of Physical Chemistry C. 112 (37): 14221–14224. doi:10.1021/jp805786p.
Au_{25}(SC_{2}H_{4}Ph)_{18}	Zhu, Manzhou; Eckenhoff, William T.; Pintauer, Tomislav; Jin, Rongchao (2008). "Conversion of Anionic [Au_{25}(SCH_{2}CH_{2}Ph)_{18}]^{−} Cluster to Charge Neutral Cluster via Air Oxidation". The Journal of Physical Chemistry C. 112 (37): 14221–14224. doi:10.1021/jp805786p.
Au_{25}(SC_{2}H_{4}Ph)_{18}	Antonello, Sabrina; Dainese, Tiziano; Pan, Fangfang; Rissanen, Kari; Maran, Flavio (2017). "Electrocrystallization of Monolayer-Protected Gold Clusters: Opening the Door to Quality, Quantity, and New Structures". Journal of the American Chemical Society. 139 (11): 4168–4174. Bibcode:2017JAChS.139.4168A. doi:10.1021/jacs.7b00568. hdl:11577/3230060. PMID 28281762.
[Au_{25}(S-nC_{5}H_{11})_{18}]_{4}	Antonello, Sabrina; Dainese, Tiziano; Pan, Fangfang; Rissanen, Kari; Maran, Flavio (2017). "Electrocrystallization of Monolayer-Protected Gold Clusters: Opening the Door to Quality, Quantity, and New Structures". Journal of the American Chemical Society. 139 (11): 4168–4174. Bibcode:2017JAChS.139.4168A. doi:10.1021/jacs.7b00568. hdl:11577/3230060. PMID 28281762.
Au_{25}(SC_{2}H_{4}Ph)_{18}	Tofanelli, Marcus A.; Salorinne, Kirsi; Ni, Thomas W.; Malola, Sami; Newell, Brian; Phillips, Billy; Häkkinen, Hannu; Ackerson, Christopher J. (2016). "Jahn–Teller effects in Au_{25}(SR)_{18}". Chemical Science. 7 (3): 1882–1890. doi:10.1039/C5SC02134K. PMC 5965251. PMID 29899911.
[Au_{25}(SC_{2}H_{4}Ph)_{18}]^{1+}	Tofanelli, Marcus A.; Salorinne, Kirsi; Ni, Thomas W.; Malola, Sami; Newell, Brian; Phillips, Billy; Häkkinen, Hannu; Ackerson, Christopher J. (2016). "Jahn–Teller effects in Au_{25}(SR)_{18}". Chemical Science. 7 (3): 1882–1890. doi:10.1039/C5SC02134K. PMC 5965251. PMID 29899911.
Au_{25}(SEt)_{18}	Dainese, Tiziano; Antonello, Sabrina; Gascón, José A.; Pan, Fangfang; Perera, Neranjan V.; Ruzzi, Marco; Venzo, Alfonso; Zoleo, Alfonso; Rissanen, Kari; Maran, Flavio (2014). "Au_{25}(SEt)_{18}, a Nearly Naked Thiolate-Protected Au_{25} Cluster: Structural Analysis by Single Crystal X-ray Crystallography and Electron Nuclear Double Resonance". ACS Nano. 8 (4): 3904–3912. doi:10.1021/nn500805n. PMID 24628268.
Au_{25}(SPr)_{18}	Agrachev, Mikhail; Antonello, Sabrina; Dainese, Tiziano; Gascón, José A.; Pan, Fangfang; Rissanen, Kari; Ruzzi, Marco; Venzo, Alfonso; Zoleo, Alfonso; Maran, Flavio (2016). "A magnetic look into the protecting layer of Au_{25} clusters". Chemical Science. 7 (12): 6910–6918. doi:10.1039/C6SC03691K. PMC 5450596. PMID 28567262.
[Au_{25}(SBu)_{18}]_{2}	De Nardi, Marco; Antonello, Sabrina; Jiang, De-en; Pan, Fangfang; Rissanen, Kari; Ruzzi, Marco; Venzo, Alfonso; Zoleo, Alfonso; Maran, Flavio (2014). "Gold Nanowired: A Linear (Au_{25})_{n} Polymer from Au_{25} Molecular Clusters". ACS Nano. 8 (8): 8505–8512. doi:10.1021/nn5031143. PMID 25088331.
[Au_{25}(PPh_{3})_{10}(SePh)_{5}Cl_{2}]^{1+}	Song, Yongbo; Jin, Shan; Kang, Xi; Xiang, Ji; Deng, Huijuan; Yu, Haizhu; Zhu, Manzhou (2016). "How a Single Electron Affects the Properties of the "Non-Superatom" Au_{25} Nanoclusters". Chemistry of Materials. 28 (8): 2609–2617. doi:10.1021/acs.chemmater.5b04655.
[Au_{25}(PPh_{3})_{10}(SePh)_{5}Cl_{2}]^{2+}	Song, Yongbo; Jin, Shan; Kang, Xi; Xiang, Ji; Deng, Huijuan; Yu, Haizhu; Zhu, Manzhou (2016). "How a Single Electron Affects the Properties of the "Non-Superatom" Au_{25} Nanoclusters". Chemistry of Materials. 28 (8): 2609–2617. doi:10.1021/acs.chemmater.5b04655.
[Au_{25}(PPh_{3})_{10}(SC_{2}H_{5})_{5}Cl_{2}]^{2+}	Shichibu, Yukatsu; Negishi, Yuichi; Watanabe, Takahito; Chaki, Nirmalya K.; Kawaguchi, Hiroyuki; Tsukuda, Tatsuya (2007). "Biicosahedral Gold Clusters [Au_{25}(PPH_{3})_{10}(SC _{n} H_{2} _{n} _{+1})_{5}Cl_{2}]^{2+} ( n = 2−18): A Stepping Stone to Cluster-Assembled Materials". The Journal of Physical Chemistry C. 111 (22): 7845–7847. doi:10.1021/jp073101t.
[Au_{25}(^{i}Pr_{2}-bimy)_{10}Br_{7}]^{2+}	Shen, Hui; Deng, Guocheng; Kaappa, Sami; Tan, Tongde; Han, Ying-Zi; Malola, Sami; Lin, Shui-Chao; Teo, Boon K.; Häkkinen, Hannu; Zheng, Nanfeng (2019). "Highly Robust but Surface-Active: An N-Heterocyclic Carbene-Stabilized Au_{25} Nanocluster". Angewandte Chemie International Edition. 58 (49): 17731–17735. doi:10.1002/anie.201908983. PMID 31517436.
[Au_{25}(^{MesCH2}Bimy)_{10}Br_{7}]^{2+}	Lummis, Paul A.; Osten, Kimberly M.; Levchenko, Tetyana I.; Sabooni Asre Hazer, Maryam; Malola, Sami; Owens-Baird, Bryan; Veinot, Alex J.; Albright, Emily L.; Schatte, Gabriele; Takano, Shinjiro; Kovnir, Kirill; Stamplecoskie, Kevin G.; Tsukuda, Tatsuya; Häkkinen, Hannu; Nambo, Masakazu; Crudden, Cathleen M. (2022). "NHC-Stabilized Au_{10} Nanoclusters and Their Conversion to Au_{25} Nanoclusters". JACS Au. 2 (4): 875–885. doi:10.1021/jacsau.2c00004. PMC 9088291. PMID 35557749.
[Au_{25}(^{MesCH2}Bimy)_{10}Br_{8}]^{+}	Lummis, Paul A.; Osten, Kimberly M.; Levchenko, Tetyana I.; Sabooni Asre Hazer, Maryam; Malola, Sami; Owens-Baird, Bryan; Veinot, Alex J.; Albright, Emily L.; Schatte, Gabriele; Takano, Shinjiro; Kovnir, Kirill; Stamplecoskie, Kevin G.; Tsukuda, Tatsuya; Häkkinen, Hannu; Nambo, Masakazu; Crudden, Cathleen M. (2022). "NHC-Stabilized Au_{10} Nanoclusters and Their Conversion to Au_{25} Nanoclusters". JACS Au. 2 (4): 875–885. doi:10.1021/jacsau.2c00004. PMC 9088291. PMID 35557749.
Au_{28}(TBBT)_{20}	Zeng, Chenjie; Li, Tao; Das, Anindita; Rosi, Nathaniel L.; Jin, Rongchao (2013). "Chiral Structure of Thiolate-Protected 28-Gold-Atom Nanocluster Determined by X-ray Crystallography". Journal of the American Chemical Society. 135 (27): 10011–10013. Bibcode:2013JAChS.13510011Z. doi:10.1021/ja404058q. PMID 23815445.
Au_{28}(S-c-C_{6}H_{11})_{20}	Chen, Yuxiang; Liu, Chong; Tang, Qing; Zeng, Chenjie; Higaki, Tatsuya; Das, Anindita; Jiang, De-en; Rosi, Nathaniel L.; Jin, Rongchao (2016). "Isomerism in Au_{28}(SR)_{20} Nanocluster and Stable Structures". Journal of the American Chemical Society. 138 (5): 1482–1485. Bibcode:2016JAChS.138.1482C. doi:10.1021/jacs.5b12094. PMID 26817394.
Au_{28}(S-c-C_{6}H_{11})_{20}	Higaki, Tatsuya; Liu, Chong; Chen, Yuxiang; Zhao, Shuo; Zeng, Chenjie; Jin, Renxi; Wang, Shuxin; Rosi, Nathaniel L.; Jin, Rongchao (2017). "Oxidation-Induced Transformation of Eight-Electron Gold Nanoclusters: [Au_{23}(SR)_{16}]^{−} to [Au_{28}(SR)_{20}]^{0}". The Journal of Physical Chemistry Letters. 8 (4): 866–870. doi:10.1021/acs.jpclett.6b03061. PMID 28145114.
Au_{29}(S-Adm)_{19}	Li, Yingwei; Zhou, Meng; Song, Yongbo; Higaki, Tatsuya; Wang, He; Jin, Rongchao (2021). "Double-helical assembly of heterodimeric nanoclusters into supercrystals". Nature. 594 (7863): 380–384. Bibcode:2021Natur.594..380L. doi:10.1038/s41586-021-03564-6. PMID 34135522.
Au_{30}S(S-^{t}Bu)_{18}	Crasto, David; Malola, Sami; Brosofsky, Grace; Dass, Amala; Häkkinen, Hannu (2014). "Single Crystal XRD Structure and Theoretical Analysis of the Chiral Au_{30}S(S- t -Bu)_{18} Cluster". Journal of the American Chemical Society. 136 (13): 5000–5005. Bibcode:2014JAChS.136.5000C. doi:10.1021/ja412141j. PMID 24605935.
Au_{30}S(S-^{t}Bu)_{18}	Yang, Huayan; Wang, Yu; Edwards, Alison J.; Yan, Juanzhu; Zheng, Nanfeng (2014). "High-yield synthesis and crystal structure of a green Au_{30}cluster co-capped by thiolate and sulfide". Chem. Commun. 50 (92): 14325–14327. doi:10.1039/C4CC01773K. PMID 25285336.
Au_{30}(S-^{t}Bu)_{18}	Dass, Amala; Jones, Tanya; Rambukwella, Milan; Crasto, David; Gagnon, Kevin J.; Sementa, Luca; De Vetta, Martina; Baseggio, Oscar; Aprà, Edoardo; Stener, Mauro; Fortunelli, Alessandro (2016). "Crystal Structure and Theoretical Analysis of Green Gold Au_{30}(S- t Bu)_{18} Nanomolecules and Their Relation to Au_{30}S(S- t Bu)_{18}". The Journal of Physical Chemistry C. 120 (11): 6256–6261. doi:10.1021/acs.jpcc.6b00062. hdl:11368/2881618.
Au_{30}(S-Adm)_{18}	Higaki, Tatsuya; Liu, Chong; Zeng, Chenjie; Jin, Renxi; Chen, Yuxiang; Rosi, Nathaniel L.; Jin, Rongchao (2016). "Controlling the Atomic Structure of Au_{30} Nanoclusters by a Ligand-Based Strategy". Angewandte Chemie International Edition. 55 (23): 6694–6697. doi:10.1002/anie.201601947. PMID 27099989.
Au_{30}(S-Adm)_{18}	Li, Yingwei; Zhou, Meng; Song, Yongbo; Higaki, Tatsuya; Wang, He; Jin, Rongchao (2021). "Double-helical assembly of heterodimeric nanoclusters into supercrystals". Nature. 594 (7863): 380–384. Bibcode:2021Natur.594..380L. doi:10.1038/s41586-021-03564-6. PMID 34135522.
Au_{34}(S-c-C_{6}H_{11})_{22}	Dong, Hongwei; Liao, Lingwen; Zhuang, Shengli; Yao, Chuanhao; Chen, Jishi; Tian, Shubo; Zhu, Min; Liu, Xu; Li, Lingling; Wu, Zhikun (2017). "A novel double-helical-kernel evolution pattern of gold nanoclusters: Alternate single-stranded growth at both ends". Nanoscale. 9 (11): 3742–3746. doi:10.1039/C6NR09724C. PMID 28134388.
Au_{34}(SPh-2,4-(CH_{3})_{2})_{22}	Zhuang, Shengli; Liao, Lingwen; Yuan, Jinyun; Xia, Nan; Zhao, Yan; Wang, Chengming; Gan, Zibao; Yan, Nan; He, Lizhong; Li, Jin; Deng, Haiteng; Guan, Zhaoyong; Yang, Jinlong; Wu, Zhikun (2019). "FCC versus Non-FCC Structural Isomerism of Gold Nanoparticles with Kernel Atom Packing Dependent Photoluminescence". Angewandte Chemie International Edition. 58 (14): 4510–4514. doi:10.1002/anie.201813426. PMID 30719808.
Au_{36}(SC_{5}H_{9})_{24}	Das, Anindita; Liu, Chong; Zeng, Chenjie; Li, Gao; Li, Tao; Rosi, Nathaniel L.; Jin, Rongchao (2014). "Cyclopentanethiolato-Protected Au_{36}(SC_{5}H_{9})_{24} Nanocluster: Crystal Structure and Implications for the Steric and Electronic Effects of Ligand". The Journal of Physical Chemistry A. 118 (37): 8264–8269. Bibcode:2014JPCA..118.8264D. doi:10.1021/jp501073a. PMID 24617814.
Au_{36}(SPh)_{24}	Nimmala, Praneeth Reddy; Knoppe, Stefan; Jupally, Vijay Reddy; Delcamp, Jared H.; Aikens, Christine M.; Dass, Amala (2014). "Au_{36}(SPH)_{24} Nanomolecules: X-ray Crystal Structure, Optical Spectroscopy, Electrochemistry, and Theoretical Analysis". The Journal of Physical Chemistry B. 118 (49): 14157–14167. doi:10.1021/jp506508x. PMID 25315687.
Au_{36}(TBBT)_{24}	Zeng, Chenjie; Qian, Huifeng; Li, Tao; Li, Gao; Rosi, Nathaniel L.; Yoon, Bokwon; Barnett, Robert N.; Whetten, Robert L.; Landman, Uzi; Jin, Rongchao (2012). "Total Structure and Electronic Properties of the Gold Nanocrystal Au_{36}(SR)_{24}". Angewandte Chemie International Edition. 51 (52): 13114–13118. doi:10.1002/anie.201207098. PMID 23154932.
Au_{36}(SCH_{2}Ph-^{t}Bu)_{8}Cl_{20}	Yang, Sha; Chai, Jinsong; Song, Yongbo; Kang, Xi; Sheng, Hongting; Chong, Hanbao; Zhu, Manzhou (2015). "A New Crystal Structure of Au_{36} with a Au_{14} Kernel Cocapped by Thiolate and Chloride". Journal of the American Chemical Society. 137 (32): 10033–10035. Bibcode:2015JAChS.13710033Y. doi:10.1021/jacs.5b06235. PMID 26252023.
[Au_{37}(PPh_{3})_{10}(SC_{2}H_{4}Ph)_{10}X_{2}]^{+}	Jin, Renxi; Liu, Chong; Zhao, Shuo; Das, Anindita; Xing, Hongzhu; Gayathri, Chakicherla; Xing, Yan; Rosi, Nathaniel L.; Gil, Roberto R.; Jin, Rongchao (2015). "Tri-icosahedral Gold Nanocluster [Au_{37}(PPH_{3})_{10}(SC_{2}H_{4}Ph)_{10}X_{2}]^{+}: Linear Assembly of Icosahedral Building Blocks". ACS Nano. 9 (8): 8530–8536. doi:10.1021/acsnano.5b03524. PMID 26214221.
Au_{38}(SC_{2}H_{4}Ph)_{24}	Qian, Huifeng; Eckenhoff, William T.; Zhu, Yan; Pintauer, Tomislav; Jin, Rongchao (2010). "Total Structure Determination of Thiolate-Protected Au_{38} Nanoparticles". Journal of the American Chemical Society. 132 (24): 8280–8281. Bibcode:2010JAChS.132.8280Q. doi:10.1021/ja103592z. PMID 20515047.
Au_{38}(SC_{2}H_{4}Ph)_{24}	Tian, Shubo; Li, Yi-Zhi; Li, Man-Bo; Yuan, Jinyun; Yang, Jinlong; Wu, Zhikun; Jin, Rongchao (2015). "Structural isomerism in gold nanoparticles revealed by X-ray crystallography". Nature Communications. 6: 8667. Bibcode:2015NatCo...6.8667T. doi:10.1038/ncomms9667. PMC 4667693. PMID 26482704.
Au_{38}S_{2}(S-Adm)_{20}	Liu, Chao; Li, Tao; Li, Gao; Nobusada, Katsuyuki; Zeng, Chenjie; Pang, Guangsheng; Rosi, Nathaniel L.; Jin, Rongchao (2015). "Observation of Body-Centered Cubic Gold Nanocluster". Angewandte Chemie. 127 (34): 9964–9967. Bibcode:2015AngCh.127.9964L. doi:10.1002/ange.201502667.
Au_{38}(2,4-(CH_{3})_{2}C_{6}H_{3}S)_{24}	Chai, Jinsong; Lv, Ying; Yang, Sha; Song, Yongbo; Zan, Xiaofeng; Li, Qinzhen; Yu, Haizhu; Wu, Mingzai; Zhu, Manzhou (2017). "X-ray Crystal Structure and Optical Properties of Au_{38– x}Cu_{x}(2,4-(CH_{3})_{2}C_{6}H_{3}S)_{24} ( x = 0–6) Alloy Nanocluster". The Journal of Physical Chemistry C. 121 (39): 21665–21669. doi:10.1021/acs.jpcc.7b05074.
Au_{38}(SPh-2,4-(CH_{3})_{2})_{24}	Zhuang, Shengli; Liao, Lingwen; Yuan, Jinyun; Xia, Nan; Zhao, Yan; Wang, Chengming; Gan, Zibao; Yan, Nan; He, Lizhong; Li, Jin; Deng, Haiteng; Guan, Zhaoyong; Yang, Jinlong; Wu, Zhikun (2019). "FCC versus Non-FCC Structural Isomerism of Gold Nanoparticles with Kernel Atom Packing Dependent Photoluminescence". Angewandte Chemie International Edition. 58 (14): 4510–4514. doi:10.1002/anie.201813426. PMID 30719808.
[Au_{39}(PPh_{3})_{14}Cl_{6}]^{2+}	Teo, Boon K.; Shi, Xiaobo; Zhang, Hong (1992). "Pure gold cluster of 1:9:9:1:9:9:1 layered structure: A novel 39-metal-atom cluster [(Ph3P)14Au39Cl6]Cl2 with an interstitial gold atom in a hexagonal antiprismatic cage". Journal of the American Chemical Society. 114 (7): 2743–2745. Bibcode:1992JAChS.114.2743T. doi:10.1021/ja00033a073.
Au_{40}(S-2-(CH_{3})Ph)_{24}	Zeng, Chenjie; Chen, Yuxiang; Liu, Chong; Nobusada, Katsuyuki; Rosi, Nathaniel L.; Jin, Rongchao (2015). "Gold tetrahedra coil up: Kekulé-like and double helical superstructures". Science Advances. 1 (9) e1500425. Bibcode:2015SciA....1E0425Z. doi:10.1126/sciadv.1500425. PMC 4646800. PMID 26601286.
Au_{42}(S-c-C_{6}H_{11})_{26}	Dong, Hongwei; Liao, Lingwen; Zhuang, Shengli; Yao, Chuanhao; Chen, Jishi; Tian, Shubo; Zhu, Min; Liu, Xu; Li, Lingling; Wu, Zhikun (2017). "A novel double-helical-kernel evolution pattern of gold nanoclusters: Alternate single-stranded growth at both ends". Nanoscale. 9 (11): 3742–3746. doi:10.1039/C6NR09724C. PMID 28134388.
Au_{42}(TBBT)_{26}	Zhuang, Shengli; Liao, Lingwen; Yuan, Jinyun; Xia, Nan; Zhao, Yan; Wang, Chengming; Gan, Zibao; Yan, Nan; He, Lizhong; Li, Jin; Deng, Haiteng; Guan, Zhaoyong; Yang, Jinlong; Wu, Zhikun (2019). "FCC versus Non-FCC Structural Isomerism of Gold Nanoparticles with Kernel Atom Packing Dependent Photoluminescence". Angewandte Chemie International Edition. 58 (14): 4510–4514. doi:10.1002/anie.201813426. PMID 30719808.
Au_{42}(TBBT)_{26}	Zhuang, Shengli; Liao, Lingwen; Zhao, Yan; Yuan, Jinyun; Yao, Chuanhao; Liu, Xu; Li, Jin; Deng, Haiteng; Yang, Jinlong; Wu, Zhikun (2018). "Is the kernel–staples match a key–lock match?". Chemical Science. 9 (9): 2437–2442. doi:10.1039/C7SC05019D. PMC 5914134. PMID 29732119.
Au_{42}(SCH_{2>}Ph)_{32}	Li, Yingwei; Song, Yongbo; Zhang, Xinwen; Liu, Tongyu; Xu, Tingting; Wang, He; Jiang, De-en; Jin, Rongchao (2022). "Atomically Precise Au_{42} Nanorods with Longitudinal Excitons for an Intense Photothermal Effect". Journal of the American Chemical Society. 144 (27): 12381–12389. Bibcode:2022JAChS.14412381L. doi:10.1021/jacs.2c03948. PMID 35767839.
Au_{43}(C_{6}H_{11})_{25}	Dong, Hongwei; Liao, Lingwen; Wu, Zhikun (2017). "Two-Way Transformation between FCC- and Nonfcc-Structured Gold Nanoclusters". The Journal of Physical Chemistry Letters. 8 (21): 5338–5343. doi:10.1021/acs.jpclett.7b02459. PMID 29039677.
Au_{44}(SPh-2,4-(CH_{3})_{2})_{26}	Liao, Lingwen; Zhuang, Shengli; Yao, Chuanhao; Yan, Nan; Chen, Jishi; Wang, Chengming; Xia, Nan; Liu, Xu; Li, Man-Bo; Li, Lingling; Bao, Xiaoli; Wu, Zhikun (2016). "Structure of Chiral Au_{44}(2,4-DMBT)_{26} Nanocluster with an 18-Electron Shell Closure". Journal of the American Chemical Society. 138 (33): 10425–10428. Bibcode:2016JAChS.13810425L. doi:10.1021/jacs.6b07178. PMID 27490914.
Au_{44}(TBBT)_{28}	Zeng, Chenjie; Chen, Yuxiang; Iida, Kenji; Nobusada, Katsuyuki; Kirschbaum, Kristin; Lambright, Kelly J.; Jin, Rongchao (2016). "Gold Quantum Boxes: On the Periodicities and the Quantum Confinement in the Au_{28}, Au_{36}, Au_{44}, and Au_{52} Magic Series". Journal of the American Chemical Society. 138 (12): 3950–3953. Bibcode:2016JAChS.138.3950Z. doi:10.1021/jacs.5b12747. PMID 26934618.
Au_{44}(^{i}Pr_{2}-bimy)_{9}(PA)_{6}Br_{8}	Shen, Hui; Xu, Zhen; Hazer, Maryam Sabooni Asre; Wu, Qingyuan; Peng, Jian; Qin, Ruixuan; Malola, Sami; Teo, Boon K.; Häkkinen, Hannu; Zheng, Nanfeng (2021). "Surface Coordination of Multiple Ligands Endows N-Heterocyclic Carbene-Stabilized Gold Nanoclusters with High Robustness and Surface Reactivity". Angewandte Chemie International Edition. 60 (7): 3752–3758. doi:10.1002/anie.202013718. PMID 33104265.
Au_{52}(TBBT)_{32}	Zeng, Chenjie; Chen, Yuxiang; Liu, Chong; Nobusada, Katsuyuki; Rosi, Nathaniel L.; Jin, Rongchao (2015). "Gold tetrahedra coil up: Kekulé-like and double helical superstructures". Science Advances. 1 (9) e1500425. Bibcode:2015SciA....1E0425Z. doi:10.1126/sciadv.1500425. PMC 4646800. PMID 26601286.
Au_{52}(PET)_{32}	Zhuang, Shengli; Liao, Lingwen; Li, Man-Bo; Yao, Chuanhao; Zhao, Yan; Dong, Hongwei; Li, Jin; Deng, Haiteng; Li, Lingling; Wu, Zhikun (2017). "The FCC structure isomerization in gold nanoclusters". Nanoscale. 9 (39): 14809–14813. doi:10.1039/C7NR05239A. PMID 28956580.
Au_{70}S_{20}(PPh_{3})_{12}	Kenzler, Sebastian; Schrenk, Claudio; Frojd, Andrew R.; Häkkinen, Hannu; Clayborne, Andre Z.; Schnepf, Andreas (2018). "Au_{70}S_{20}(PPH_{3})_{12}: An intermediate sized metalloid gold cluster stabilized by the Au_{4}S_{4} ring motif and Au-PPH_{3} groups". Chemical Communications. 54 (3): 248–251. doi:10.1039/C7CC08014J. PMID 29220046.
Au_{92}(TBBT)_{44}	Zeng, Chenjie; Liu, Chong; Chen, Yuxiang; Rosi, Nathaniel L.; Jin, Rongchao (2016). "Atomic Structure of Self-Assembled Monolayer of Thiolates on a Tetragonal Au_{92} Nanocrystal". Journal of the American Chemical Society. 138 (28): 8710–8713. Bibcode:2016JAChS.138.8710Z. doi:10.1021/jacs.6b04835. PMID 27355843.
Au_{102}(p-MBA)_{44}	Jadzinsky, Pablo D.; Calero, Guillermo; Ackerson, Christopher J.; Bushnell, David A.; Kornberg, Roger D. (2007). "Structure of a Thiol Monolayer-Protected Gold Nanoparticle at 1.1 Å Resolution". Science. 318 (5849): 430–433. Bibcode:2007Sci...318..430J. doi:10.1126/science.1148624. PMID 17947577.
Au_{102}(p-MBA)_{40}(p-BBT)_{4}	Heinecke, Christine L.; Ni, Thomas W.; Malola, Sami; Mäkinen, Ville; Wong, O. Andrea; Häkkinen, Hannu; Ackerson, Christopher J. (2012). "Structural and Theoretical Basis for Ligand Exchange on Thiolate Monolayer Protected Gold Nanoclusters". Journal of the American Chemical Society. 134 (32): 13316–13322. Bibcode:2012JAChS.13413316H. doi:10.1021/ja3032339. PMC 4624284. PMID 22816317.
Au_{103}S_{2}(S-Nap)_{41}	Higaki, Tatsuya; Liu, Chong; Zhou, Meng; Luo, Tian-Yi; Rosi, Nathaniel L.; Jin, Rongchao (2017). "Tailoring the Structure of 58-Electron Gold Nanoclusters: Au_{103}S_{2}(S-Nap)_{41} and Its Implications". Journal of the American Chemical Society. 139 (29): 9994–10001. Bibcode:2017JAChS.139.9994H. doi:10.1021/jacs.7b04678. PMID 28661158.
[Au_{110}(p-CF_{3}C_{6}H_{4}CC)_{48}]^{2-}	Wang, Jia-Qi; Shi, Shuang; He, Rui-Lin; Yuan, Shang-Fu; Yang, Gao-Yuan; Liang, Gui-Jie; Wang, Quan-Ming (2020). "Total Structure Determination of the Largest Alkynyl-Protected FCC Gold Nanocluster Au_{110} and the Study on Its Ultrafast Excited-State Dynamics". Journal of the American Chemical Society. 142 (42): 18086–18092. Bibcode:2020JAChS.14218086W. doi:10.1021/jacs.0c07397. PMID 32985888.
Au_{130}(p-MBT)_{50}	Chen, Yuxiang; Zeng, Chenjie; Liu, Chong; Kirschbaum, Kristin; Gayathri, Chakicherla; Gil, Roberto R.; Rosi, Nathaniel L.; Jin, Rongchao (2015). "Crystal Structure of Barrel-Shaped Chiral Au_{130}( p -MBT)_{50} Nanocluster". Journal of the American Chemical Society. 137 (32): 10076–10079. Bibcode:2015JAChS.13710076C. doi:10.1021/jacs.5b05378. PMID 26244606.
Au_{133}(SPh^{t}Bu)_{52}	Zeng, Chenjie; Chen, Yuxiang; Kirschbaum, Kristin; Appavoo, Kannatassen; Sfeir, Matthew Y.; Jin, Rongchao (2015). "Structural patterns at all scales in a nonmetallic chiral Au _{133} (SR) _{52} nanoparticle". Science Advances. 1 (2) e1500045. Bibcode:2015SciA....1E0045Z. doi:10.1126/sciadv.1500045. PMC 4643822. PMID 26601152.
Au_{144}(SCH_{2}Ph)_{60}	Yan, Nan; Xia, Nan; Liao, Lingwen; Zhu, Min; Jin, Fengming; Jin, Rongchao; Wu, Zhikun (2018). "Unraveling the long-pursued Au _{144} structure by x-ray crystallography". Science Advances. 4 (10) eaat7259. Bibcode:2018SciA....4.7259Y. doi:10.1126/sciadv.aat7259. PMC 6184749. PMID 30333988.
Au_{144}(CCAr)_{60}	Lei, Zhen; Li, Jiao-Jiao; Wan, Xian-Kai; Zhang, Wen-Han; Wang, Quan-Ming (2018). "Isolation and Total Structure Determination of an All-Alkynyl-Protected Gold Nanocluster Au_{144}". Angewandte Chemie International Edition. 57 (28): 8639–8643. doi:10.1002/anie.201804481. PMID 29771454.
Au_{146}(p-MBA)_{57}	Vergara, Sandra; Lukes, Dylan A.; Martynowycz, Michael W.; Santiago, Ulises; Plascencia-Villa, Germán; Weiss, Simon C.; de la Cruz, M. Jason; Black, David M.; Alvarez, Marcos M.; López-Lozano, Xochitl; Barnes, Christopher O.; Lin, Guowu; Weissker, Hans-Christian; Whetten, Robert L.; Gonen, Tamir; Yacaman, Miguel Jose; Calero, Guillermo (2017). "MicroED Structure of Au_{146}(p-MBA)_{57} at Subatomic Resolution Reveals a Twinned FCC Cluster". The Journal of Physical Chemistry Letters. 8 (22): 5523–5530. doi:10.1021/acs.jpclett.7b02621. PMC 5769702. PMID 29072840.
Au_{191}(SPh-^{t}Bu)_{66}	Sakthivel, Naga Arjun; Shabaninezhad, Masoud; Sementa, Luca; Yoon, Bokwon; Stener, Mauro; Whetten, Robert L.; Ramakrishna, Guda; Fortunelli, Alessandro; Landman, Uzi; Dass, Amala (2020). "The Missing Link: Au_{191}(SPH- t Bu)_{66} Janus Nanoparticle with Molecular and Bulk-Metal-like Properties". Journal of the American Chemical Society. 142 (37): 15799–15814. Bibcode:2020JAChS.14215799S. doi:10.1021/jacs.0c05685. hdl:11368/2980477. PMID 32881489.
Au_{246}(p-MBT)_{80}	Zeng, Chenjie; Chen, Yuxiang; Kirschbaum, Kristin; Lambright, Kelly J.; Jin, Rongchao (2016). "Emergence of hierarchical structural complexities in nanoparticles and their assembly". Science. 354 (6319): 1580–1584. Bibcode:2016Sci...354.1580Z. doi:10.1126/science.aak9750. PMID 28008066.
Au_{279}(SPh-^{t}Bu)_{84}	Sakthivel, Naga Arjun; Theivendran, Shevanuja; Ganeshraj, Vigneshraja; Oliver, Allen G.; Dass, Amala (2017). "Crystal Structure of Faradaurate-279: Au_{279}(SPH- t Bu)_{84} Plasmonic Nanocrystal Molecules". Journal of the American Chemical Society. 139 (43): 15450–15459. Bibcode:2017JAChS.13915450S. doi:10.1021/jacs.7b08651. PMID 28991464.

== Silver ==
Table of the crystal structures of silver MPCs.
Formula	References
[{Ag(Ph_{2}PS_{2})(dppe)}_{2}]	Shafaei-Fallah, Maryam; Anson, Christopher E.; Fenske, Dieter; Rothenberger, Alexander (2005). "Functionalised trimethylsilyl reagents in cluster synthesis: Reactions of Ph2P(S)SSiMe3 with group 11 salts". Dalton Transactions (13): 2300–2304. doi:10.1039/B501360G. PMID 15962051.
[{Ag(Ph_{2}PS_{2})(dppe)}_{4}]^{+}	Shafaei-Fallah, Maryam; Anson, Christopher E.; Fenske, Dieter; Rothenberger, Alexander (2005). "Functionalised trimethylsilyl reagents in cluster synthesis: Reactions of Ph2P(S)SSiMe3 with group 11 salts". Dalton Transactions (13): 2300–2304. doi:10.1039/B501360G. PMID 15962051.
[Ag_{8}(F){S_{2}P(CH_{2}CH_{2}Ph)_{2}}_{6}]^{+}	Liao, Jian-Hong; Latouche, Camille; Li, Bing; Kahlal, Samia; Saillard, Jean-Yves; Liu, C. W. (2014). "A Twelve-Coordinated Iodide in a Cuboctahedral Silver(I) Skeleton". Inorganic Chemistry. 53 (4): 2260–2267. doi:10.1021/ic402960e. PMID 24476137.
[Ag_{8}(Cl){S_{2}P(CH_{2}CH_{2}Ph)_{2}}_{6}]^{+}	Liao, Jian-Hong; Latouche, Camille; Li, Bing; Kahlal, Samia; Saillard, Jean-Yves; Liu, C. W. (2014). "A Twelve-Coordinated Iodide in a Cuboctahedral Silver(I) Skeleton". Inorganic Chemistry. 53 (4): 2260–2267. doi:10.1021/ic402960e. PMID 24476137.
[Ag_{8}(Br){S_{2}P(CH_{2}CH_{2}Ph)_{2}}_{6}]^{+}	Liao, Jian-Hong; Latouche, Camille; Li, Bing; Kahlal, Samia; Saillard, Jean-Yves; Liu, C. W. (2014). "A Twelve-Coordinated Iodide in a Cuboctahedral Silver(I) Skeleton". Inorganic Chemistry. 53 (4): 2260–2267. doi:10.1021/ic402960e. PMID 24476137.
[Ag_{8}(pfga)_{6}]^{6-}	Liu, Kuan-Guan; Gao, Xue-Mei; Liu, Tongyu; Hu, Mao-Lin; Jiang, De-en (2020). "All-Carboxylate-Protected Superatomic Silver Nanocluster with an Unprecedented Rhombohedral Ag_{8} Core". Journal of the American Chemical Society. 142 (40): 16905–16909. Bibcode:2020JAChS.14216905L. doi:10.1021/jacs.0c06682. PMID 32941019.
[{Ag(Ph_{2}PS_{2})(dppe)}_{10}]	Shafaei-Fallah, Maryam; Anson, Christopher E.; Fenske, Dieter; Rothenberger, Alexander (2005). "Functionalised trimethylsilyl reagents in cluster synthesis: Reactions of Ph2P(S)SSiMe3 with group 11 salts". Dalton Transactions (13): 2300–2304. doi:10.1039/B501360G. PMID 15962051.
[Ag_{12}(μ_{12}-I)(μ_{3}-I)_{4}{S_{2}P(CH_{2}CH_{2}Ph)_{2}}_{6}]^{+}	Liao, Jian-Hong; Latouche, Camille; Li, Bing; Kahlal, Samia; Saillard, Jean-Yves; Liu, C. W. (2014). "A Twelve-Coordinated Iodide in a Cuboctahedral Silver(I) Skeleton". Inorganic Chemistry. 53 (4): 2260–2267. doi:10.1021/ic402960e. PMID 24476137.
Ag_{12}(SCH_{2}C_{10}H_{7})_{6}(CF_{3}CO_{2})_{6}(CH_{3}CN)_{6}	Xu, Qing-Qing; Dong, Xi-Yan; Huang, Ren-Wu; Li, Bo; Zang, Shuang-Quan; Mak, Thomas C. W. (2015). "A thermochromic silver nanocluster exhibiting dual emission character". Nanoscale. 7 (5): 1650–1654. Bibcode:2015Nanos...7.1650X. doi:10.1039/C4NR05122J. PMID 25556676.
Ag_{14}(SC_{6}H_{3}F_{2})_{12}(PPh_{3})_{8}	Yang, Huayan; Lei, Jing; Wu, Binghui; Wang, Yu; Zhou, Meng; Xia, Andong; Zheng, Lansun; Zheng, Nanfeng (2013). "Crystal structure of a luminescent thiolated Ag nanocluster with an octahedral Ag_{6}^{4+}core". Chem. Commun. 49 (3): 300–302. doi:10.1039/C2CC37347E. PMID 23183545.
Ag_{16}(DPPE)_{4}(SC_{6}H_{3}F_{2})_{14}	Yang, Huayan; Wang, Yu; Zheng, Nanfeng (2013). "Stabilizing subnanometer Ag(0) nanoclusters by thiolate and diphosphine ligands and their crystal structures". Nanoscale. 5 (7): 2674–2677. Bibcode:2013Nanos...5.2674Y. doi:10.1039/C3NR34328F. PMID 23467729.
DNA-Ag_{8}	Huard, Dustin J. E.; Demissie, Aida; Kim, Dahye; Lewis, David; Dickson, Robert M.; Petty, Jeffrey T.; Lieberman, Raquel L. (2019). "Atomic Structure of a Fluorescent Ag_{8} Cluster Templated by a Multistranded DNA Scaffold". Journal of the American Chemical Society. 141 (29): 11465–11470. Bibcode:2019JAChS.14111465H. doi:10.1021/jacs.8b12203. PMC 6606393. PMID 30562465. (PDB: 6NIZ)
DNA-Ag_{16}-NC	Cerretani, Cecilia; Kanazawa, Hiroki; Vosch, Tom; Kondo, Jiro (2019). "Crystal structure of a NIR-Emitting DNA-Stabilized Ag_{16} Nanocluster". Angewandte Chemie International Edition. 58 (48): 17153–17157. doi:10.1002/anie.201906766. PMID 31411360. (PDB: 6JR4)
DNA-A_{10}:Ag_{16}	Cerretani, Cecilia; Kondo, Jiro; Vosch, Tom (2020). "Removal of the A_{10} adenosine in a DNA-stabilized Ag_{16} nanocluster". RSC Advances. 10 (40): 23854–23860. Bibcode:2020RSCAd..1023854C. doi:10.1039/D0RA02672G. PMC 9054913. PMID 35517326. (PDB: 6M2P)
DNA(A5)-Ag_{16}	Cerretani, Cecilia; Kondo, Jiro; Vosch, Tom (2020). "Mutation of position 5 as a crystal engineering tool for a NIR-emitting DNA-stabilized Ag_{16} nanocluster". CrystEngComm. 22 (46): 8136–8141. Bibcode:2020CEG....22.8136C. doi:10.1039/D0CE01225D. (PDB: 7BSE)
DNA(C5)-Ag_{16}	Cerretani, Cecilia; Kondo, Jiro; Vosch, Tom (2020). "Mutation of position 5 as a crystal engineering tool for a NIR-emitting DNA-stabilized Ag_{16} nanocluster". CrystEngComm. 22 (46): 8136–8141. Bibcode:2020CEG....22.8136C. doi:10.1039/D0CE01225D. (PDB: 7BSF)
DNA(G5-NIR)-Ag_{16}	Cerretani, Cecilia; Kondo, Jiro; Vosch, Tom (2020). "Mutation of position 5 as a crystal engineering tool for a NIR-emitting DNA-stabilized Ag_{16} nanocluster". CrystEngComm. 22 (46): 8136–8141. Bibcode:2020CEG....22.8136C. doi:10.1039/D0CE01225D. (PDB: 7BSG)
DNA(X5)-Ag_{16}	Cerretani, Cecilia; Kondo, Jiro; Vosch, Tom (2020). "Mutation of position 5 as a crystal engineering tool for a NIR-emitting DNA-stabilized Ag_{16} nanocluster". CrystEngComm. 22 (46): 8136–8141. Bibcode:2020CEG....22.8136C. doi:10.1039/D0CE01225D. (PDB: 7BSH)
DNA-Ag_{16}	Cerretani, Cecilia; Liisberg, Mikkel B.; Rück, Vanessa; Kondo, Jiro; Vosch, Tom (2022). "The effect of inosine on the spectroscopic properties and crystal structure of a NIR-emitting DNA-stabilized silver nanocluster". Nanoscale Advances. 4 (15): 3212–3217. Bibcode:2022NanoA...4.3212C. doi:10.1039/D2NA00325B. PMC 9416947. PMID 36132821. (PDB: 6JR4)
DNA-Ag_{16}	Cerretani, Cecilia; Liisberg, Mikkel B.; Rück, Vanessa; Kondo, Jiro; Vosch, Tom (2022). "The effect of inosine on the spectroscopic properties and crystal structure of a NIR-emitting DNA-stabilized silver nanocluster". Nanoscale Advances. 4 (15): 3212–3217. Bibcode:2022NanoA...4.3212C. doi:10.1039/D2NA00325B. PMC 9416947. PMID 36132821. (PDB: 7XLV)
[Ag_{20}{S_{2}P(OPr)_{2}}_{12}]	Dhayal, Rajendra S.; Lin, Yan-Ru; Liao, Jian-Hong; Chen, Yuan-Jang; Liu, Yu-Chiao; Chiang, Ming-Hsi; Kahlal, Samia; Saillard, Jean-Yves; Liu, C. W. (2016). "[Ag_{20}{S_{2}P(OR)_{2}}_{12}]: A Superatom Complex with a Chiral Metallic Core and High Potential for Isomerism" (PDF). Chemistry – A European Journal. 22 (29): 9943–9947. doi:10.1002/chem.201602275. PMID 27189869.
[Ag_{20}{S_{2}P(O^{i}Pr)_{2}}_{12}]	Dhayal, Rajendra S.; Lin, Yan-Ru; Liao, Jian-Hong; Chen, Yuan-Jang; Liu, Yu-Chiao; Chiang, Ming-Hsi; Kahlal, Samia; Saillard, Jean-Yves; Liu, C. W. (2016). "[Ag_{20}{S_{2}P(OR)_{2}}_{12}]: A Superatom Complex with a Chiral Metallic Core and High Potential for Isomerism" (PDF). Chemistry – A European Journal. 22 (29): 9943–9947. doi:10.1002/chem.201602275. PMID 27189869.
[Ag_{21}{S_{2}P(OiPr)_{2}}_{12}]^{+}	Dhayal, Rajendra S.; Liao, Jian-Hong; Liu, Yu-Chiao; Chiang, Ming-His; Kahlal, Samia; Saillard, Jean-Yves; Liu, C. W. (2015). "[Ag_{21}{S_{2}P(O i Pr)_{2}}_{12}]^{+}: An Eight-Electron Superatom". Angewandte Chemie International Edition. 54 (12): 3702–3706. doi:10.1002/anie.201410332. PMID 25631754.
Ag_{23}(PPh_{3})_{8}(SC_{2}H_{4}Ph)_{18}	Liu, Chao; Li, Tao; Abroshan, Hadi; Li, Zhimin; Zhang, Chen; Kim, Hyung J.; Li, Gao; Jin, Rongchao (2018). "Chiral Ag23 nanocluster with open shell electronic structure and helical face-centered cubic framework". Nature Communications. 9 (1): 744. doi:10.1038/s41467-018-03136-9. PMC 5821857. PMID 29467372.
[Ag_{24}(PS_{4})(iPrSPS_{3})_{4}{S(tol)}_{12}(dppe)_{6})]^{+}	Rothenberger, Alexander; Shafaei-Fallah, Maryam; Shi, Weifeng (2007). "A recipe for new organometallic polymers and oligomers? Synthesis and structure of an oligo- and a polymeric arrangement of P–S anions". Chem. Commun. (15): 1499–1501. doi:10.1039/B617177J. PMID 17406686.
[Ag_{25}(SPh(CH_{3})_{2})_{18}]^{−}	Joshi, Chakra P.; Bootharaju, Megalamane S.; Alhilaly, Mohammad J.; Bakr, Osman M. (2015). "[Ag_{25}(SR)_{18}]^{−}: The "Golden" Silver Nanoparticle". Journal of the American Chemical Society. 137 (36): 11578–11581. doi:10.1021/jacs.5b07088. hdl:10754/576875. PMID 26322865.
[Ag_{28}(S^{t}Bu)_{23}]^{5+}	Zhou, Kun; Qin, Chao; Wang, Xin-Long; Shao, Kui-Zhan; Yan, Li-Kai; Su, Zhong-Min (2014). "Self-assembly of an all-thiol-stabilized {Ag28S23} high-nuclearity luminescent nanocluster with a "crab-like" shape". Dalton Transactions. 43 (28): 10695–10699. doi:10.1039/C4DT00762J. PMID 24921974.
Ag_{29}(BDT)_{12}(TPP)_{4}	Abdulhalim, Lina G.; Bootharaju, Megalamane S.; Tang, Qing; Del Gobbo, Silvano; Abdulhalim, Rasha G.; Eddaoudi, Mohamed; Jiang, De-en; Bakr, Osman M. (2015). "Ag_{29}(BDT)_{12}(TPP)_{4}: A Tetravalent Nanocluster". Journal of the American Chemical Society. 137 (37): 11970–11975. Bibcode:2015JAChS.13711970A. doi:10.1021/jacs.5b04547. hdl:10754/558586. PMID 26104755.
[Ag_{29}(BDT)_{12}(TPP)_{4}]^{3-}	Nag, Abhijit; Chakraborty, Papri; Bodiuzzaman, Mohammad; Ahuja, Tripti; Antharjanam, Sudhadevi; Pradeep, Thalappil (2018). "Polymorphism of Ag_{29}(BDT)_{12}(TPP)_{4}^{3−} cluster: Interactions of secondary ligands and their effect on solid state luminescence". Nanoscale. 10 (21): 9851–9855. doi:10.1039/C8NR02629G. PMID 29790561.
[Ag_{32}(DPPE)_{5}(SC_{6}H_{4}CF_{3})_{24}]^{2-}	Yang, Huayan; Wang, Yu; Zheng, Nanfeng (2013). "Stabilizing subnanometer Ag(0) nanoclusters by thiolate and diphosphine ligands and their crystal structures". Nanoscale. 5 (7): 2674–2677. Bibcode:2013Nanos...5.2674Y. doi:10.1039/C3NR34328F. PMID 23467729.
[Ag_{32}(Dppm)_{5}(SAdm)_{13}Cl_{8}]^{3+}	Zou, Xuejuan; Jin, Shan; Du, Wenjun; Li, Yangfeng; Li, Peng; Wang, Shuxin; Zhu, Manzhou (2017). "Multi-ligand-directed synthesis of chiral silver nanoclusters". Nanoscale. 9 (43): 16800–16805. doi:10.1039/C7NR06338E. PMID 29072749.
Ag_{38}(SPhF_{2})_{26}(PPh_{3})_{8}	Yang, Huayan; Yan, Juanzhu; Wang, Yu; Su, Haifeng; Gell, Lars; Zhao, Xiaojing; Xu, Chaofa; Teo, Boon K.; Häkkinen, Hannu; Zheng, Nanfeng (2017). "Embryonic Growth of Face-Center-Cubic Silver Nanoclusters Shaped in Nearly Perfect Half-Cubes and Cubes". Journal of the American Chemical Society. 139 (1): 31–34. Bibcode:2017JAChS.139...31Y. doi:10.1021/jacs.6b10053. PMID 27992210.
Ag_{38}(SPhF_{2})_{26}(P^{n}Bu_{3})_{8}	Yang, Huayan; Yan, Juanzhu; Wang, Yu; Su, Haifeng; Gell, Lars; Zhao, Xiaojing; Xu, Chaofa; Teo, Boon K.; Häkkinen, Hannu; Zheng, Nanfeng (2017). "Embryonic Growth of Face-Center-Cubic Silver Nanoclusters Shaped in Nearly Perfect Half-Cubes and Cubes". Journal of the American Chemical Society. 139 (1): 31–34. Bibcode:2017JAChS.139...31Y. doi:10.1021/jacs.6b10053. PMID 27992210.
[Ag_{40}(SPh(CH_{3})_{2})_{24}(PPh_{3})_{8}]^{2+}	Bodiuzzaman, Mohammad; Ghosh, Atanu; Sugi, Korath Shivan; Nag, Abhijit; Khatun, Esma; Varghese, Babu; Paramasivam, Ganesan; Antharjanam, Sudhadevi; Natarajan, Ganapati; Pradeep, Thalappil (2019). "Camouflaging Structural Diversity: Co-crystallization of Two Different Nanoparticles Having Different Cores but the Same Shell". Angewandte Chemie International Edition. 58 (1): 189–194. doi:10.1002/anie.201809469. PMID 30411444.
[Ag_{40}(DMBT)_{24}(PPh_{3})_{8}H_{12}]^{2+}	Yuan, Xiting; Sun, Cunfa; Li, Xihua; Malola, Sami; Teo, Boon K.; Häkkinen, Hannu; Zheng, Lan-Sun; Zheng, Nanfeng (2019). "Combinatorial Identification of Hydrides in a Ligated Ag_{40} Nanocluster with Noncompact Metal Core". Journal of the American Chemical Society. 141 (30): 11905–11911. Bibcode:2019JAChS.14111905Y. doi:10.1021/jacs.9b03009. PMID 31294970.
[Ag_{44}(p-MBA)_{30}]^{4-}	Desireddy, Anil; Conn, Brian E.; Guo, Jingshu; Yoon, Bokwon; Barnett, Robert N.; Monahan, Bradley M.; Kirschbaum, Kristin; Griffith, Wendell P.; Whetten, Robert L.; Landman, Uzi; Bigioni, Terry P. (2013). "Ultrastable silver nanoparticles". Nature. 501 (7467): 399–402. Bibcode:2013Natur.501..399D. doi:10.1038/nature12523. PMID 24005327.
[Ag_{44}(SPhF)_{30}]^{4-}	Yang, Huayan; Wang, Yu; Huang, Huaqi; Gell, Lars; Lehtovaara, Lauri; Malola, Sami; Häkkinen, Hannu; Zheng, Nanfeng (2013). "All-thiol-stabilized Ag44 and Au12Ag32 nanoparticles with single-crystal structures". Nature Communications. 4: 2422. doi:10.1038/ncomms3422. PMID 24005600.
[Ag_{44}(SPhF_{2})_{30}]^{4-}	Yang, Huayan; Wang, Yu; Huang, Huaqi; Gell, Lars; Lehtovaara, Lauri; Malola, Sami; Häkkinen, Hannu; Zheng, Nanfeng (2013). "All-thiol-stabilized Ag44 and Au12Ag32 nanoparticles with single-crystal structures". Nature Communications. 4: 2422. doi:10.1038/ncomms3422. PMID 24005600.
[Ag_{44}(SPhF_{3})_{30}]^{4-}	Yang, Huayan; Wang, Yu; Huang, Huaqi; Gell, Lars; Lehtovaara, Lauri; Malola, Sami; Häkkinen, Hannu; Zheng, Nanfeng (2013). "All-thiol-stabilized Ag44 and Au12Ag32 nanoparticles with single-crystal structures". Nature Communications. 4: 2422. doi:10.1038/ncomms3422. PMID 24005600.
Ag_{44}(EBT)_{26}(TPP)_{4}	Bootharaju, Megalamane S.; Lee, Sanghwa; Deng, Guocheng; Malola, Sami; Baek, Woonhyuk; Häkkinen, Hannu; Zheng, Nanfeng; Hyeon, Taeghwan (2021). "Ag_{44}(EBT)_{26}(TPP)_{4} Nanoclusters with Tailored Molecular and Electronic Structure". Angewandte Chemie International Edition. 60 (16): 9038–9044. doi:10.1002/anie.202015907. PMID 33372362.
[Ag_{45}(Dppm)_{4}(S^{t}Bu)_{16}Br_{12}]^{3+}	Zou, Xuejuan; Jin, Shan; Du, Wenjun; Li, Yangfeng; Li, Peng; Wang, Shuxin; Zhu, Manzhou (2017). "Multi-ligand-directed synthesis of chiral silver nanoclusters". Nanoscale. 9 (43): 16800–16805. doi:10.1039/C7NR06338E. PMID 29072749.
[Ag_{46}(SPh(CH_{3})_{2})_{24}(PPh_{3})_{8}]^{2+}	Bodiuzzaman, Mohammad; Ghosh, Atanu; Sugi, Korath Shivan; Nag, Abhijit; Khatun, Esma; Varghese, Babu; Paramasivam, Ganesan; Antharjanam, Sudhadevi; Natarajan, Ganapati; Pradeep, Thalappil (2019). "Camouflaging Structural Diversity: Co-crystallization of Two Different Nanoparticles Having Different Cores but the Same Shell". Angewandte Chemie International Edition. 58 (1): 189–194. doi:10.1002/anie.201809469. PMID 30411444.
Ag_{50}(Dppm)_{6}(SPh-^{t}Bu)_{30}	Du, Wenjun; Jin, Shan; Xiong, Lin; Chen, Man; Zhang, Jun; Zou, Xuejuan; Pei, Yong; Wang, Shuxin; Zhu, Manzhou (2017). "Ag_{50}(DPPM)_{6}(SR)_{30} and Its Homologue Au_{x}Ag_{50– x}(DPPM)_{6}(SR)_{30} Alloy Nanocluster: Seeded Growth, Structure Determination, and Differences in Properties". Journal of the American Chemical Society. 139 (4): 1618–1624. Bibcode:2017JAChS.139.1618D. doi:10.1021/jacs.6b11681. PMID 28111946.
[Ag_{51}(Dppm)_{4}(S^{t}Bu)_{16}Br_{6}]^{3+}	Zou, Xuejuan; Jin, Shan; Du, Wenjun; Li, Yangfeng; Li, Peng; Wang, Shuxin; Zhu, Manzhou (2017). "Multi-ligand-directed synthesis of chiral silver nanoclusters". Nanoscale. 9 (43): 16800–16805. doi:10.1039/C7NR06338E. PMID 29072749.
[Ag_{62}S_{12}(S^{t}Bu)_{32}]^{2+}	Jin, Shan; Wang, Shuxin; Song, Yongbo; Zhou, Meng; Zhong, Juan; Zhang, Jun; Xia, Andong; Pei, Yong; Chen, Man; Li, Peng; Zhu, Manzhou (2014). "Crystal Structure and Optical Properties of the [Ag_{62}S_{12}(SBu^{t})_{32}]^{2+} Nanocluster with a Complete Face-Centered Cubic Kernel". Journal of the American Chemical Society. 136 (44): 15559–15565. Bibcode:2014JAChS.13615559J. doi:10.1021/ja506773d. PMID 25343538.
[Ag_{52}(SAdm)_{31}Cl_{13}]^{2+}	Zou, Xuejuan; Lv, Ying; Kang, Xi; Yu, Haizhu; Jin, Shan; Zhu, Manzhou (2021). "Structure Determination of the Cl-Enriched [Ag_{52}(SAdm)_{31}Cl_{13}]^{2+} Nanocluster". Inorganic Chemistry. 60 (19): 14803–14809. doi:10.1021/acs.inorgchem.1c02067. PMID 34516083.
[Ag_{62}S_{13}(S-^{t}Bu)_{32}]^{4+}	Li, Gen; Lei, Zhen; Wang, Quan-Ming (2010). "Luminescent Molecular Ag−S Nanocluster [Ag_{62}S_{13}(SBu^{t})_{32}](BF_{4})_{4}". Journal of the American Chemical Society. 132 (50): 17678–17679. doi:10.1021/ja108684m. PMID 21114326.
[Ag_{63}(SPhF_{2})_{36}(PPh_{3})_{8}]^{+}	Yang, Huayan; Yan, Juanzhu; Wang, Yu; Su, Haifeng; Gell, Lars; Zhao, Xiaojing; Xu, Chaofa; Teo, Boon K.; Häkkinen, Hannu; Zheng, Nanfeng (2017). "Embryonic Growth of Face-Center-Cubic Silver Nanoclusters Shaped in Nearly Perfect Half-Cubes and Cubes". Journal of the American Chemical Society. 139 (1): 31–34. Bibcode:2017JAChS.139...31Y. doi:10.1021/jacs.6b10053. PMID 27992210.
[Ag_{63}(SPhF_{2})_{36}(P^{n}Bu_{3})_{8}]^{+}	Yang, Huayan; Yan, Juanzhu; Wang, Yu; Su, Haifeng; Gell, Lars; Zhao, Xiaojing; Xu, Chaofa; Teo, Boon K.; Häkkinen, Hannu; Zheng, Nanfeng (2017). "Embryonic Growth of Face-Center-Cubic Silver Nanoclusters Shaped in Nearly Perfect Half-Cubes and Cubes". Journal of the American Chemical Society. 139 (1): 31–34. Bibcode:2017JAChS.139...31Y. doi:10.1021/jacs.6b10053. PMID 27992210.
[Ag_{67}(SPhMe_{2})_{32}(PPh_{3})_{8}]^{3+}	Alhilaly, Mohammad J.; Bootharaju, Megalamane S.; Joshi, Chakra P.; Besong, Tabot M.; Emwas, Abdul-Hamid; Juarez-Mosqueda, Rosalba; Kaappa, Sami; Malola, Sami; Adil, Karim; Shkurenko, Aleksander; Häkkinen, Hannu; Eddaoudi, Mohamed; Bakr, Osman M. (2016). "[Ag_{67}(SPhMe_{2})_{32}(PPH_{3})_{8}]^{3+}: Synthesis, Total Structure, and Optical Properties of a Large Box-Shaped Silver Nanocluster". Journal of the American Chemical Society. 138 (44): 14727–14732. Bibcode:2016JAChS.13814727A. doi:10.1021/jacs.6b09007. hdl:10754/622496. PMID 27733038.
Ag_{70}S_{16}(SPh)_{34}(PhCO_{2})_{4}(triphos)_{4}	Wang, Xiu-Jian; Langetepe, Timo; Persau, Claudia; Kang, Bei-Sheng; Sheldrick, George M.; Fenske, Dieter (2002). "Syntheses and Crystal Structures of the New Ag–S Clusters [Ag70S16(SPH)34(PhCO2)4(triphos)4] and [Ag188S94(PR3)30]". Angewandte Chemie International Edition. 41 (20): 3818–3822. doi:10.1002/1521-3773(20021018)41:20<3818::AID-ANIE3818>3.0.CO;2-R. PMID 12386858.
Ag_{78}(DPPP)_{6}(SPhCF_{3})_{42}	Yang, Huayan; Yan, Juanzhu; Wang, Yu; Deng, Guocheng; Su, Haifeng; Zhao, Xiaojing; Xu, Chaofa; Teo, Boon K.; Zheng, Nanfeng (2017). "From Racemic Metal Nanoparticles to Optically Pure Enantiomers in One Pot". Journal of the American Chemical Society. 139 (45): 16113–16116. Bibcode:2017JAChS.13916113Y. doi:10.1021/jacs.7b10448. PMID 29053274.
Ag_{78}(R-BDPP)_{6}(SPhCF_{3})_{42}	Yang, Huayan; Yan, Juanzhu; Wang, Yu; Deng, Guocheng; Su, Haifeng; Zhao, Xiaojing; Xu, Chaofa; Teo, Boon K.; Zheng, Nanfeng (2017). "From Racemic Metal Nanoparticles to Optically Pure Enantiomers in One Pot". Journal of the American Chemical Society. 139 (45): 16113–16116. Bibcode:2017JAChS.13916113Y. doi:10.1021/jacs.7b10448. PMID 29053274.
Ag_{78}(S-BDPP)_{6}(SPhCF_{3})_{42}	Yang, Huayan; Yan, Juanzhu; Wang, Yu; Deng, Guocheng; Su, Haifeng; Zhao, Xiaojing; Xu, Chaofa; Teo, Boon K.; Zheng, Nanfeng (2017). "From Racemic Metal Nanoparticles to Optically Pure Enantiomers in One Pot". Journal of the American Chemical Society. 139 (45): 16113–16116. Bibcode:2017JAChS.13916113Y. doi:10.1021/jacs.7b10448. PMID 29053274.
SD/Ag90a	Su, Yan-Min; Wang, Zhi; Schein, Stan; Tung, Chen-Ho; Sun, Di (2020). "A Keplerian Ag90 nest of Platonic and Archimedean polyhedra in different symmetry groups". Nature Communications. 11 (1): 3316. doi:10.1038/s41467-020-17198-1. PMC 7335041. PMID 32620807.
SD/Ag90b	Su, Yan-Min; Wang, Zhi; Schein, Stan; Tung, Chen-Ho; Sun, Di (2020). "A Keplerian Ag90 nest of Platonic and Archimedean polyhedra in different symmetry groups". Nature Communications. 11 (1): 3316. doi:10.1038/s41467-020-17198-1. PMC 7335041. PMID 32620807.
[Ag_{115}S_{34}(SCH_{2}C_{6}H_{4}^{t}Bu)_{47}(dpph)_{6}]	Bestgen, Sebastian; Fuhr, Olaf; Breitung, Ben; Kiran Chakravadhanula, Venkata Sei; Guthausen, Gisela; Hennrich, Frank; Yu, Wen; Kappes, Manfred M.; Roesky, Peter W.; Fenske, Dieter (2017). "[Ag_{115}S_{34}(SCH_{2}C_{6}H_{4}^{t}Bu)_{47}(DPPH)_{6}]: Synthesis, crystal structure and NMR investigations of a soluble silver chalcogenide nanocluster". Chemical Science. 8 (3): 2235–2240. doi:10.1039/C6SC04578B. PMC 5408567. PMID 28507679.
Ag_{123}S_{35}(S^{t}Bu)_{50}	Fenske, Dieter; Anson, Christopher E.; Eichhöfer, Andreas; Fuhr, Olaf; Ingendoh, Arnd; Persau, Claudia; Richert, Clemens (2005). "Syntheses and Crystal Structures of [Ag_{123}S_{35}(S t Bu)_{50}] and [Ag_{344}S_{124}(S t Bu)_{96}]". Angewandte Chemie International Edition. 44 (33): 5242–5246. doi:10.1002/anie.200501414. PMID 16052644.
[Ag_{136}(SPh-^{t}Bu)_{64}Cl_{3}]^{−}	Yang, Huayan; Wang, Yu; Chen, Xi; Zhao, Xiaojing; Gu, Lin; Huang, Huaqi; Yan, Juanzhu; Xu, Chaofa; Li, Gang; Wu, Junchao; Edwards, Alison J.; Dittrich, Birger; Tang, Zichao; Wang, Dongdong; Lehtovaara, Lauri; Häkkinen, Hannu; Zheng, Nanfeng (2016). "Plasmonic twinned silver nanoparticles with molecular precision". Nature Communications. 7 12809. Bibcode:2016NatCo...712809Y. doi:10.1038/ncomms12809. PMC 5023969. PMID 27611564.
[Ag_{141}Cl_{12}(S-Adm)_{40}]^{3+}	Ren, Liting; Yuan, Peng; Su, Haifeng; Malola, Sami; Lin, Shuichao; Tang, Zichao; Teo, Boon K.; Häkkinen, Hannu; Zheng, Lansun; Zheng, Nanfeng (2017). "Bulky Surface Ligands Promote Surface Reactivities of [Ag_{141}X_{12}(S-Adm)_{40}]^{3+} (X = Cl, Br, I) Nanoclusters: Models for Multiple-Twinned Nanoparticles". Journal of the American Chemical Society. 139 (38): 13288–13291. Bibcode:2017JAChS.13913288R. doi:10.1021/jacs.7b07926. PMID 28892364.
[Ag_{141}Br_{12}(S-Adm)_{40}]^{3+}	Ren, Liting; Yuan, Peng; Su, Haifeng; Malola, Sami; Lin, Shuichao; Tang, Zichao; Teo, Boon K.; Häkkinen, Hannu; Zheng, Lansun; Zheng, Nanfeng (2017). "Bulky Surface Ligands Promote Surface Reactivities of [Ag_{141}X_{12}(S-Adm)_{40}]^{3+} (X = Cl, Br, I) Nanoclusters: Models for Multiple-Twinned Nanoparticles". Journal of the American Chemical Society. 139 (38): 13288–13291. Bibcode:2017JAChS.13913288R. doi:10.1021/jacs.7b07926. PMID 28892364.
Ag_{188}S_{94}(P(C_{3}H_{7})_{3})_{30}	Wang, Xiu-Jian; Langetepe, Timo; Persau, Claudia; Kang, Bei-Sheng; Sheldrick, George M.; Fenske, Dieter (2002). "Syntheses and Crystal Structures of the New Ag–S Clusters [Ag70S16(SPH)34(PhCO2)4(triphos)4] and [Ag188S94(PR3)30]". Angewandte Chemie International Edition. 41 (20): 3818–3822. doi:10.1002/1521-3773(20021018)41:20<3818::AID-ANIE3818>3.0.CO;2-R. PMID 12386858.
Ag_{210}(SPh^{i}Pr)_{71}(PPh_{3})_{5}Cl	Liu, Jun-Yan; Alkan, Fahri; Wang, Zhi; Zhang, Zhen-Yi; Kurmoo, Mohamedally; Yan, Zier; Zhao, Quan-Qin; Aikens, Christine M.; Tung, Chen-Ho; Sun, Di (2019). "Different Silver Nanoparticles in One Crystal: Ag_{210}(^{i}PRPHS)_{71}(Ph_{3}P)_{5}Cl and Ag_{211}(^{i}PRPHS)_{71}(Ph_{3}P)_{6}Cl". Angewandte Chemie International Edition. 58 (1): 195–199. doi:10.1002/anie.201810772. PMID 30411441.
Ag_{211}(SPh^{i}Pr)_{71}(PPh_{3})_{6}Cl	Liu, Jun-Yan; Alkan, Fahri; Wang, Zhi; Zhang, Zhen-Yi; Kurmoo, Mohamedally; Yan, Zier; Zhao, Quan-Qin; Aikens, Christine M.; Tung, Chen-Ho; Sun, Di (2019). "Different Silver Nanoparticles in One Crystal: Ag_{210}(^{i}PRPHS)_{71}(Ph_{3}P)_{5}Cl and Ag_{211}(^{i}PRPHS)_{71}(Ph_{3}P)_{6}Cl". Angewandte Chemie International Edition. 58 (1): 195–199. doi:10.1002/anie.201810772. PMID 30411441.
Ag_{344}S_{124}(S^{t}Bu)_{96}	Fenske, Dieter; Anson, Christopher E.; Eichhöfer, Andreas; Fuhr, Olaf; Ingendoh, Arnd; Persau, Claudia; Richert, Clemens (2005). "Syntheses and Crystal Structures of [Ag_{123}S_{35}(S t Bu)_{50}] and [Ag_{344}S_{124}(S t Bu)_{96}]". Angewandte Chemie International Edition. 44 (33): 5242–5246. doi:10.1002/anie.200501414. PMID 16052644.
[Ag_{374}(SPh-^{t}Bu)_{113}Br_{2}Cl_{2}]^{−}	Yang, Huayan; Wang, Yu; Chen, Xi; Zhao, Xiaojing; Gu, Lin; Huang, Huaqi; Yan, Juanzhu; Xu, Chaofa; Li, Gang; Wu, Junchao; Edwards, Alison J.; Dittrich, Birger; Tang, Zichao; Wang, Dongdong; Lehtovaara, Lauri; Häkkinen, Hannu; Zheng, Nanfeng (2016). "Plasmonic twinned silver nanoparticles with molecular precision". Nature Communications. 7 12809. Bibcode:2016NatCo...712809Y. doi:10.1038/ncomms12809. PMC 5023969. PMID 27611564.

== Copper ==
Table of the crystal structures of copper MPCs.
Formula	References
[(Me_{3}-tach)_{3}Cu_{6}-(μ_{6}-H)Cl_{4}]^{2+}	Köhn, Randolf D.; Pan, Zhida; Mahon, Mary F.; Kociok-Köhn, Gabriele (2003). "Trimethyltriazacyclohexane as bridging ligand for triangular Cu_{3}units and C–H hydride abstraction into a Cu_{6}cluster". Chem. Commun. (11): 1272–1273. doi:10.1039/B302670A. PMID 12809226.
[Cu_{7}(H){S_{2}C(aza-15-crown-5)}_{6}]^{+}	Liao, Ping-Kuei; Fang, Ching-Shiang; Edwards, Alison J.; Kahlal, Samia; Saillard, Jean-Yves; Liu, C. W. (2012). "Hydrido Copper Clusters Supported by Dithiocarbamates: Oxidative Hydride Removal and Neutron Diffraction Analysis of [Cu_{7}(H){S_{2}C(aza-15-crown-5)}_{6}]". Inorganic Chemistry. 51 (12): 6577–6591. doi:10.1021/ic300135w. PMID 22663192.
[Cu_{7}(H)S(C_{5}H_{9})_{7}(PPh_{3})_{3}]	Biswass, Sourav; Pal, Amit; Jena, Milan Kumar; Hossain, Sakiat; Jin, Sakai; Das, Saikat; Sahoo, Basudev; Pathak, Biswarup; Negishi, Yuichi (2024). "Luminescent Hydride-Free [Cu_{7}(H)S(C_{5}H_{9})_{7}(PPh_{3})_{3}] Nanocluster: Facilitating Highly Selective C–C Bond Formation". Journal of the American Chemical Society. 146 (30): 20937–20944. Bibcode:2024JAChS.14620937B. doi:10.1021/jacs.4c05678. PMID 38979882.
[Cu_{8}(H){S_{2}(NEt_{2})}_{6}]^{+}	Liao, Ping-Kuei; Fang, Ching-Shiang; Edwards, Alison J.; Kahlal, Samia; Saillard, Jean-Yves; Liu, C. W. (2012). "Hydrido Copper Clusters Supported by Dithiocarbamates: Oxidative Hydride Removal and Neutron Diffraction Analysis of [Cu_{7}(H){S_{2}C(aza-15-crown-5)}_{6}]". Inorganic Chemistry. 51 (12): 6577–6591. doi:10.1021/ic300135w. PMID 22663192.
[Cu_{8}(H){S_{2}(N^{n}Pr_{2})}_{6}]^{+}	Liao, Ping-Kuei; Fang, Ching-Shiang; Edwards, Alison J.; Kahlal, Samia; Saillard, Jean-Yves; Liu, C. W. (2012). "Hydrido Copper Clusters Supported by Dithiocarbamates: Oxidative Hydride Removal and Neutron Diffraction Analysis of [Cu_{7}(H){S_{2}C(aza-15-crown-5)}_{6}]". Inorganic Chemistry. 51 (12): 6577–6591. doi:10.1021/ic300135w. PMID 22663192.
Cu_{11}H_{3}(Tf-dpf)_{6}(OAc)_{2}	Liu, Chun-Yu; Yuan, Shang-Fu; Wang, Song; Guan, Zong-Jie; Jiang, De-en; Wang, Quan-Ming (2022). "Structural transformation and catalytic hydrogenation activity of amidinate-protected copper hydride clusters". Nature Communications. 13 (1): 2082. Bibcode:2022NatCo..13.2082L. doi:10.1038/s41467-022-29819-y. PMC 9018778. PMID 35440582.
Cu_{12}S_{6}(dppo)_{4}	Yang, Xiao-Xun; Issac, Ibrahim; Lebedkin, Sergej; Kühn, Michael; Weigend, Florian; Fenske, Dieter; Fuhr, Olaf; Eichhöfer, Andreas (2014). "Red-luminescent biphosphine stabilized 'Cu_{12}S_{6}' cluster molecules". Chemical Communications. 50 (75): 11043–11045. doi:10.1039/C4CC04702H. PMID 25098944.
[Cu_{12}H_{3}(Tf-dpf)_{6}(OAc)_{2}]^{+}	Liu, Chun-Yu; Yuan, Shang-Fu; Wang, Song; Guan, Zong-Jie; Jiang, De-en; Wang, Quan-Ming (2022). "Structural transformation and catalytic hydrogenation activity of amidinate-protected copper hydride clusters". Nature Communications. 13 (1): 2082. Bibcode:2022NatCo..13.2082L. doi:10.1038/s41467-022-29819-y. PMC 9018778. PMID 35440582.
[Cu_{13}(S_{2}CN^{n}Bu_{2})_{6}(CC(C(O)OCH_{3}))_{4}]^{+}	Chakrahari, Kiran Kumarvarma; Liao, Jian-Hong; Kahlal, Samia; Liu, Yu-Chiao; Chiang, Ming-Hsi; Saillard, Jean-Yves; Liu, C. W. (2016). "[Cu_{13}{S_{2}CN^{n}Bu_{2}}_{6}(acetylide)_{4}]^{+}: A Two-Electron Superatom" (PDF). Angewandte Chemie International Edition. 55 (47): 14704–14708. doi:10.1002/anie.201608609. PMID 27781357.
[Cu_{13}(S_{2}CN^{n}Bu_{2})_{6}(CC(C_{6}H_{4}F))_{4}]^{+}	Chakrahari, Kiran Kumarvarma; Liao, Jian-Hong; Kahlal, Samia; Liu, Yu-Chiao; Chiang, Ming-Hsi; Saillard, Jean-Yves; Liu, C. W. (2016). "[Cu_{13}{S_{2}CN^{n}Bu_{2}}_{6}(acetylide)_{4}]^{+}: A Two-Electron Superatom" (PDF). Angewandte Chemie International Edition. 55 (47): 14704–14708. doi:10.1002/anie.201608609. PMID 27781357.
[Cu_{14}H_{12}(phen)_{6}(PPh_{3})_{4}]^{2+}	Nguyen, Thuy-Ai D.; Goldsmith, Bryan R.; Zaman, Homaira T.; Wu, Guang; Peters, Baron; Hayton, Trevor W. (2015). "Synthesis and Characterization of a Cu_{14} Hydride Cluster Supported by Neutral Donor Ligands". Chemistry – A European Journal. 21 (14): 5341–5344. doi:10.1002/chem.201500422. PMID 25702682.
[Cu_{17}(^{t}BuCC)_{16}(MeOH)]^{+}	Zhang, Li-Min; Mak, Thomas C. W. (2016). "Comproportionation Synthesis of Copper(I) Alkynyl Complexes Encapsulating Polyoxomolybdate Templates: Bowl-Shaped Cu_{33} and Peanut-Shaped Cu_{62} Nanoclusters". Journal of the American Chemical Society. 138 (9): 2909–2912. Bibcode:2016JAChS.138.2909Z. doi:10.1021/jacs.5b12103. PMID 26899875.
[Cu_{18}(^{t}BuCC)_{16}(H_{2}O)_{2}]^{2+}	Zhang, Li-Min; Mak, Thomas C. W. (2016). "Comproportionation Synthesis of Copper(I) Alkynyl Complexes Encapsulating Polyoxomolybdate Templates: Bowl-Shaped Cu_{33} and Peanut-Shaped Cu_{62} Nanoclusters". Journal of the American Chemical Society. 138 (9): 2909–2912. Bibcode:2016JAChS.138.2909Z. doi:10.1021/jacs.5b12103. PMID 26899875.
Cu_{18}H_{7}(S(C_{6}H_{4})PPh_{2})_{10}I	Huertos, Miguel A.; Cano, Israel; Bandeira, Nuno A. G.; Benet-Buchholz, Jordi; Bo, Carles; Van Leeuwen, Piet W. N. M. (2014). "Phosphinothiolates as Ligands for Polyhydrido Copper Nanoclusters". Chemistry – A European Journal. 20 (49): 16121–16127. doi:10.1002/chem.201404763. PMID 25284300.
[Cu_{18}H_{17}(PPh_{3})_{10}]^{+}	Nguyen, Thuy-Ai D.; Jones, Zachary R.; Goldsmith, Bryan R.; Buratto, William R.; Wu, Guang; Scott, Susannah L.; Hayton, Trevor W. (2015). "A Cu_{25} Nanocluster with Partial Cu(0) Character". Journal of the American Chemical Society. 137 (41): 13319–13324. Bibcode:2015JAChS.13713319N. doi:10.1021/jacs.5b07574. PMID 26422670.
Cu_{20}(H)_{11}(S_{2}P(O^{i}Pr)_{2})_{9}	Dhayal, Rajendra S.; Liao, Jian-Hong; Lin, Yan-Ru; Liao, Ping-Kuei; Kahlal, Samia; Saillard, Jean-Yves; Liu, C. W. (2013). "A Nanospheric Polyhydrido Copper Cluster of Elongated Triangular Orthobicupola Array: Liberation of H_{2} from Solar Energy". Journal of the American Chemical Society. 135 (12): 4704–4707. Bibcode:2013JAChS.135.4704D. doi:10.1021/ja401576s. PMID 23472670.
Cu_{23}(^{t}BuCC)_{13}(CF_{3}COO)_{6}	Han, Bao-Liang; Liu, Zhen; Feng, Lei; Wang, Zhi; Gupta, Rakesh Kumar; Aikens, Christine M.; Tung, Chen-Ho; Sun, Di (2020). "Polymorphism in Atomically Precise Cu_{23} Nanocluster Incorporating Tetrahedral [Cu_{4}]^{0} Kernel". Journal of the American Chemical Society. 142 (12): 5834–5841. Bibcode:2020JAChS.142.5834H. doi:10.1021/jacs.0c01053. PMID 32126754.
[Cu_{23}(^{t}BuCC)_{13}(CF_{3}COO)_{6}]·CHCl_{3}	Han, Bao-Liang; Liu, Zhen; Feng, Lei; Wang, Zhi; Gupta, Rakesh Kumar; Aikens, Christine M.; Tung, Chen-Ho; Sun, Di (2020). "Polymorphism in Atomically Precise Cu_{23} Nanocluster Incorporating Tetrahedral [Cu_{4}]^{0} Kernel". Journal of the American Chemical Society. 142 (12): 5834–5841. Bibcode:2020JAChS.142.5834H. doi:10.1021/jacs.0c01053. PMID 32126754.
[Cu_{25}H_{22}(PPh_{3})_{12}]^{+}	Nguyen, Thuy-Ai D.; Jones, Zachary R.; Goldsmith, Bryan R.; Buratto, William R.; Wu, Guang; Scott, Susannah L.; Hayton, Trevor W. (2015). "A Cu_{25} Nanocluster with Partial Cu(0) Character". Journal of the American Chemical Society. 137 (41): 13319–13324. Bibcode:2015JAChS.13713319N. doi:10.1021/jacs.5b07574. PMID 26422670.
[Cu_{25}H_{10}(SPhCl_{2})_{18}]^{3–}	Sun, Cunfa; Mammen, Nisha; Kaappa, Sami; Yuan, Peng; Deng, Guocheng; Zhao, Chaowei; Yan, Juanzhu; Malola, Sami; Honkala, Karoliina; Häkkinen, Hannu; Teo, Boon K.; Zheng, Nanfeng (2019). "Atomically Precise, Thiolated Copper–Hydride Nanoclusters as Single-Site Hydrogenation Catalysts for Ketones in Mild Conditions". ACS Nano. 13 (5): 5975–5986. doi:10.1021/acsnano.9b02052. PMC 6750866. PMID 31067029.
[Cu_{28}(H)_{15}15(S_{2}CNR)_{12}]^{+}	Edwards, Alison J.; Dhayal, Rajendra S.; Liao, Ping-Kuei; Liao, Jian-Hong; Chiang, Ming-Hsi; Piltz, Ross O.; Kahlal, Samia; Saillard, Jean-Yves; Liu, C. W. (2014). "Chinese Puzzle Molecule: A 15 Hydride, 28 Copper Atom Nanoball". Angewandte Chemie International Edition. 53 (28): 7214–7218. doi:10.1002/anie.201403324. PMID 24803070.
[Cu_{28}H_{20}(S_{2}P(OiPr)_{2})_{9}]^{−}	Liu, Xianhu; Shen, Hui; Gao, Yang; Deng, Guocheng; Deng, Hongwen; Han, Ying-Zi; Teo, Boon K.; Zheng, Nanfeng (2022). "Cu_{28}H_{20}: A peculiar chiral nanocluster with an exposed Cu atom and 13 surface hydrides". Chemical Communications. 58 (55): 7670–7673. doi:10.1039/D1CC06415K. PMID 35727172.
[Cu_{29}Cl_{4}H_{22}(Ph_{2}phen)_{12}]+	Nguyen, Thuy-Ai D.; Jones, Zachary R.; Leto, Domenick F.; Wu, Guang; Scott, Susannah L.; Hayton, Trevor W. (2016). "Ligand-Exchange-Induced Growth of an Atomically Precise Cu_{29} Nanocluster from a Smaller Cluster". Chemistry of Materials. 28 (22): 8385–8390. doi:10.1021/acs.chemmater.6b03879.
Cu_{32}(H)_{20}(S_{2}P(O^{i}Pr)_{2})_{12}	Dhayal, Rajendra S.; Liao, Jian-Hong; Kahlal, Samia; Wang, Xiaoping; Liu, Yu-Chiao; Chiang, Ming-Hsi; Van Zyl, Werner E.; Saillard, Jean-Yves; Liu, C. W. (2015). "[Cu_{32}(H)_{20}{S_{2}P(O i Pr)_{2}}_{12}]: The Largest Number of Hydrides Recorded in a Molecular Nanocluster by Neutron Diffraction". Chemistry – A European Journal. 21 (23): 8369–8374. doi:10.1002/chem.201501122. OSTI 1261439. PMID 25899822.
[Cu_{32}(PET)_{24}H_{8}Cl_{2}]^{2-}	Lee, Sanghwa; Bootharaju, Megalamane S.; Deng, Guocheng; Malola, Sami; Baek, Woonhyuk; Häkkinen, Hannu; Zheng, Nanfeng; Hyeon, Taeghwan (2020). "[Cu_{32}(PET)_{24}H_{8}Cl_{2}](PPH_{4})_{2}: A Copper Hydride Nanocluster with a Bisquare Antiprismatic Core". Journal of the American Chemical Society. 142 (32): 13974–13981. Bibcode:2020JAChS.14213974L. doi:10.1021/jacs.0c06577. PMID 32672452.
[Cu_{33}(^{t}BuCC)_{24}(Mo_{4}O_{16})]^{+}	Zhang, Li-Min; Mak, Thomas C. W. (2016). "Comproportionation Synthesis of Copper(I) Alkynyl Complexes Encapsulating Polyoxomolybdate Templates: Bowl-Shaped Cu_{33} and Peanut-Shaped Cu_{62} Nanoclusters". Journal of the American Chemical Society. 138 (9): 2909–2912. Bibcode:2016JAChS.138.2909Z. doi:10.1021/jacs.5b12103. PMID 26899875.
[Cu_{48}S_{20}(O^{t}Bu)_{2}(Ph_{2}PS_{2})_{2}(dppm^{−})_{4}(dppm)_{4}]	Shafaei-Fallah, Maryam; Anson, Christopher E.; Fenske, Dieter; Rothenberger, Alexander (2005). "Functionalised trimethylsilyl reagents in cluster synthesis: Reactions of Ph2P(S)SSiMe3 with group 11 salts". Dalton Transactions (13): 2300–2304. doi:10.1039/B501360G. PMID 15962051.
[Cu_{53}(COOCF_{3})_{10}(CC^{t}Bu)_{20}Cl_{2}H_{18}]^{+}	Yuan, Peng; Chen, Ruihao; Zhang, Xiaomin; Chen, Fengjiao; Yan, Juanzhu; Sun, Cunfa; Ou, Daohui; Peng, Jian; Lin, Shuichao; Tang, Zichao; Teo, Boon K.; Zheng, Lan-Sun; Zheng, Nanfeng (2019). "Ether-Soluble Cu_{53} Nanoclusters as an Effective Precursor of High-Quality CuI Films for Optoelectronic Applications". Angewandte Chemie International Edition. 58 (3): 835–839. doi:10.1002/anie.201812236. PMID 30406951.
[Cu_{62}(^{t}BuCC)_{16}(Mo_{5}O_{19})_{2}(MoO_{4})_{2}(OTf)_{2}(OH)_{4}]^{2+}	Zhang, Li-Min; Mak, Thomas C. W. (2016). "Comproportionation Synthesis of Copper(I) Alkynyl Complexes Encapsulating Polyoxomolybdate Templates: Bowl-Shaped Cu_{33} and Peanut-Shaped Cu_{62} Nanoclusters". Journal of the American Chemical Society. 138 (9): 2909–2912. Bibcode:2016JAChS.138.2909Z. doi:10.1021/jacs.5b12103. PMID 26899875.

== Aluminium ==
Table of the crystal structures of aluminum MPCs.
Formula	References
{Al(μ^{5}-C_{5}Me_{5})}_{4}	Dohmeier, Carsten; Robl, Christian; Tacke, Matthias; Schnöckel, Hansgeorg (1991). "The Tetrameric Aluminum(<SCP>I</SCP>) Compound [{Al(η^{5}-C_{5}Me_{5})}_{4}]". Angewandte Chemie International Edition in English. 30 (5): 564–565. doi:10.1002/anie.199105641.
Al_{4}[Si(^{t}Bu)_{3}]_{4}	Purath, Andreas; Dohmeier, Carsten; Ecker, Achim; Schnöckel, Hansgeorg; Amelunxen, Kerstin; Passler, Thomas; Wiberg, Nils (1998). "Synthesis and Crystal Structure of the Tetraaluminatetrahedrane Al_{4}[Si( t -Bu)_{3}]_{4}, the Second Al_{4}R_{4} Compound". Organometallics. 17 (9): 1894–1896. doi:10.1021/om971015h.
[Al_{7}{N(SiMe_{3})_{2}}_{6}]^{−}	Purath, Andreas; Köppe, Ralf; Schnöckel, Hansgeorg (1999). "[Al7{N(SiMe3)2}6]−: A First Step towards Aluminum Metal Formation by Disproportionation". Angewandte Chemie International Edition. 38 (19): 2926–2928. doi:10.1002/(SICI)1521-3773(19991004)38:19<2926::AID-ANIE2926>3.0.CO;2-B. PMID 10540395.
[Al_{12}(^{t}Bu)_{12}]^{2-}	Klinkhammer, Karl-Wilhelm; Uhl, Werner; Wagner, Jürgen; Hiller, Wolfgang (1991). "K_{2}[Al_{12} i Bu_{12}], a Compound with Al_{12} Icosahedra". Angewandte Chemie International Edition in English. 30 (2): 179–180. doi:10.1002/anie.199101791.
[Al_{12}(N(SiMe_{3})_{2})_{18}]^{1-}	Purath, Andreas; Köppe, Ralf; Schnöckel, Hansgeorg (1999). "An Al12R8− cluster as an intermediate on the way from aluminium(I) compounds to aluminium metal†". Chemical Communications (19): 1933–1934. doi:10.1039/A904247D.
[Al_{14}{N(SiMe_{3})_{2}}_{6}I_{6}]^{2−}	Köhnlein, Harald; Stösser, Gregor; Baum, Elke; Möllhausen, Evelyn; Huniar, Uwe; Schnöckel, Hansgeorg (2000). "A Metalloid Al14 Cluster with the Structure of a "Nano-Wheel"". Angewandte Chemie International Edition. 39 (4): 799–801. doi:10.1002/(SICI)1521-3773(20000218)39:4<799::AID-ANIE799>3.0.CO;2-B. PMID 10760874.
Al_{22}Cl_{20}(THF)_{12}	Klemp, Christoph; Bruns, Michael; Gauss, Jürgen; Häussermann, Ulrich; Stösser, Gregor; Van Wüllen, Leo; Jansen, Martin; Schnöckel, Hansgeorg (2001). "Al_{22}Cl_{20}·12L (L = THF, THP): The First Polyhedral Aluminum Chlorides". Journal of the American Chemical Society. 123 (37): 9099–9106. doi:10.1021/ja004022x. PMID 11552817.
Al_{22}Cl_{20}(THP)_{12}	Klemp, Christoph; Bruns, Michael; Gauss, Jürgen; Häussermann, Ulrich; Stösser, Gregor; Van Wüllen, Leo; Jansen, Martin; Schnöckel, Hansgeorg (2001). "Al_{22}Cl_{20}·12L (L = THF, THP): The First Polyhedral Aluminum Chlorides". Journal of the American Chemical Society. 123 (37): 9099–9106. doi:10.1021/ja004022x. PMID 11552817.
Al_{50}(C_{5}Me_{5})_{12}	Vollet, Jean; Hartig, Jens R.; Schnöckel, Hansgeorg (2004). "Al_{50}C_{120}H_{180}: A Pseudofullerene Shell of 60 Carbon Atoms and 60 Methyl Groups Protecting a Cluster Core of 50 Aluminum Atoms". Angewandte Chemie International Edition. 43 (24): 3186–3189. doi:10.1002/anie.200453754. PMID 15199573.
[Al_{69}{N(SiMe_{3})_{2}}_{18}]^{3-}	Köhnlein, H.; Purath, A.; Klemp, C.; Baum, E.; Krossing, I.; Stösser, G.; Schnöckel, H. (2001). "Synthesis and Characterization of an Al_{69}^{3-} Cluster with 51 Naked al Atoms: Analogies and Differences to the Previously Characterized Al_{77}^{2-} Cluster". Inorganic Chemistry. 40 (19): 4830–4838. doi:10.1021/ic0104297. PMID 11531428.
[Al_{77}(N(SiMe_{3})_{2})_{20}]^{2-}	Ecker, A.; Weckert, E.; Schnöckel, H. (1997). "Synthesis and structural characterization of an AI77 cluster". Nature. 387 (6631): 379–381. doi:10.1038/387379a0.

== Gallium ==
Table of the crystal structures of gallium MPCs.
Formula	References
Ga_{4}(Si(SiMe_{3})_{3})_{4}	Linti, Gerald (1996). "Zur chemie des galliums, 61: Tris(trimethylsilyl) silylgallium(I) —eine experimentelle und theoretische studie". Journal of Organometallic Chemistry. 520 (1–2): 107–113. doi:10.1016/0022-328X(96)06317-6.
Ga_{8}(C(SiMe_{3})_{3})_{6}	Schnepf, Andreas; Köppe, Ralf; Schnöckel, Hansgeorg (2001). "A Ga8R6 Cluster as an Ideal Model for a Metal-Metal Bond?". Angewandte Chemie International Edition. 40 (7): 1241–1243. doi:10.1002/1521-3773(20010401)40:7<1241::AID-ANIE1241>3.0.CO;2-J. PMID 11301437.
Ga_{9}(^{t}Bu)_{9}	Uhl, Werner; Cuypers, Lars; Harms, Klaus; Kaim, Wolfgang; Wanner, Matthias; Winter, Rainer; Koch, Rainer; Saak, Wolfgang (2001). "Ga9(CMe3)9, an Important New Building Block in the Structural Chemistry of the Alkylelement(I) Compounds EnRn (E=B-In)". Angewandte Chemie International Edition. 40 (3): 566–568. doi:10.1002/1521-3773(20010202)40:3<566::AID-ANIE566>3.0.CO;2-T.
Ga_{10}[Si(SiMe_{3})_{3}]_{6}	Kehrwald, Michael; Köstler, Wolfgang; Rodig, Alexander; Linti, Gerald; Blank, Thomas; Wiberg, Nils (2001). "Ga_{10}[Si(SiMe_{3})_{3}]_{6}, [Ga_{10}(Si t Bu_{3})_{6}]^{−}, and [Ga_{13}(Si t Bu_{3})_{6}]^{−}Syntheses and Structural Characterization of Novel Gallium Cluster Compounds". Organometallics. 20 (5): 860–867. doi:10.1021/om000703p.
[Ga_{10}(Si^{t}Bu_{3})_{6}]^{−}	Kehrwald, Michael; Köstler, Wolfgang; Rodig, Alexander; Linti, Gerald; Blank, Thomas; Wiberg, Nils (2001). "Ga_{10}[Si(SiMe_{3})_{3}]_{6}, [Ga_{10}(Si t Bu_{3})_{6}]^{−}, and [Ga_{13}(Si t Bu_{3})_{6}]^{−}Syntheses and Structural Characterization of Novel Gallium Cluster Compounds". Organometallics. 20 (5): 860–867. doi:10.1021/om000703p.
[Ga_{12}(C_{13}H_{9})_{10}]^{2−}	Schnepf, Andreas; Stößer, Gregor; Köppe, Ralf; Schnöckel, Hansgeorg (2000). "[Li(THF)4]2+[Ga12(C13H9)10]2−: The First Molecular Compound with an Icosahedral Ga12 Framework". Angewandte Chemie International Edition. 39 (9): 1637–1639. doi:10.1002/(SICI)1521-3773(20000502)39:9<1637::AID-ANIE1637>3.0.CO;2-O. PMID 10820460.
[Ga_{18}(Si^{t}Bu_{3})8]	Donchev, Alexander; Schnepf, Andreas; Stößer, Gregor; Baum, Elke; Schnöckel, Hansgeorg; Blank, Thomas; Wiberg, Nils (2001). "[Ga18(SitBu3)8] and [Ga22(SitBu3)8]—Syntheses and Structural Characterization of Novel Gallium Cluster Compounds". Chemistry - A European Journal. 7 (15): 3348–3353. doi:10.1002/1521-3765(20010803)7:15<3348::AID-CHEM3348>3.0.CO;2-8. PMID 11531121.
[Ga_{19}(C(SiMe_{3})_{3})_{6}]^{−}	Schnepf, A.; Stösser, G.; Schnöckel, H. (2000). "Synthesis, Structure, and Bonding of a Molecular Metalloid Ga_{19} Cluster Anion". Journal of the American Chemical Society. 122 (38): 9178–9181. Bibcode:2000JAChS.122.9178S. doi:10.1021/ja000990o.
[Ga_{22}(Si^{t}Bu_{3})8]	Donchev, Alexander; Schnepf, Andreas; Stößer, Gregor; Baum, Elke; Schnöckel, Hansgeorg; Blank, Thomas; Wiberg, Nils (2001). "[Ga18(SitBu3)8] and [Ga22(SitBu3)8]—Syntheses and Structural Characterization of Novel Gallium Cluster Compounds". Chemistry - A European Journal. 7 (15): 3348–3353. doi:10.1002/1521-3765(20010803)7:15<3348::AID-CHEM3348>3.0.CO;2-8. PMID 11531121.
[Ga_{22}{N(SiMe_{3})_{2}}_{10}]^{2−}	Schnepf, Andreas; Stößer, Gregor; Schnöckel, Hansgeorg (2002). "[Ga22{N(SiMe3)2}10]2−: A Metalloid Cluster Compound with a Variation of the Ga22 Framework This work was supported by the Deutsche Forschungsgemeinschaft and the Fonds der Chemische Industrie". Angewandte Chemie International Edition. 41 (11): 1882. doi:10.1002/1521-3773(20020603)41:11<1882::AID-ANIE1882>3.0.CO;2-N.
Ga_{23}{N(SiMe_{3})_{2}}_{11}	Hartig, Jens; Stößer, Anna; Hauser, Petra; Schnöckel, Hansgeorg (2007). "A Metalloid [Ga_{23}{N(SiMe_{3})_{2}}_{11}] Cluster: The Jellium Model Put to Test". Angewandte Chemie International Edition. 46 (10): 1658–1662. doi:10.1002/anie.200604311. PMID 17230594.
[Ga_{26}(Si(SiMe_{3})_{3})_{8}]^{−}	Rodig, Alexander; Linti, Gerald (2000). "Synthesis and Structure of an Anionic Ga26R8 Cluster with a Metalloid Core". Angewandte Chemie. 39 (16): 2952–2954. Bibcode:2000AngCh..39.2952R. doi:10.1002/1521-3773(20000818)39:16<2952::AID-ANIE2952>3.0.CO;2-M. PMID 11028022.
[Ga_{84}{N(SiMe_{3})_{2}}_{20}]^{4−}	Schnepf, Andreas; Schnöckel, Hansgeorg (2001). "Synthesis and Structure of a Ga84R204− Cluster-A Link between Metalloid Clusters and Fullerenes?". Angewandte Chemie International Edition. 40 (4): 711–715. doi:10.1002/1521-3773(20010216)40:4<711::AID-ANIE7110>3.0.CO;2-K. PMID 11241599.

== Germanium ==
Table of the crystal structures of germanium MPCs.
Formula	References
[Ge_{9}{Si(SiMe_{3})_{3}}_{3}]^{−}	Schnepf, Andreas (2003). "[Ge_{9}{Si(SiMe_{3})_{3}}_{3}]^{−}: A Soluble Polyhedral Ge_{9} Cluster Stabilized by Only Three Silyl Ligands". Angewandte Chemie International Edition. 42 (23): 2624–2625. doi:10.1002/anie.200250683. PMID 12813736.
ZnGe_{18}{Si(SiMe_{3})_{3}}_{4}{Ge(SiMe_{3})_{3}}_{2}	Kysliak, Oleksandr; Schnepf, Andreas (2019). "[Ge_{9}{Si(SiMe_{3})_{3}}_{2}{Ge(SiMe_{3})_{3}}]^{–}: The Mixed Substituted Metalloid Germanium Cluster and the Intermetalloid Cluster [ZnGe_{18}{Si(SiMe_{3})_{3}}_{4}{Ge(SiMe_{3})_{3}}_{2}]". Zeitschrift für Anorganische und Allgemeine Chemie. 645 (3): 335–339. doi:10.1002/zaac.201800296.
[Ge_{9}(Si(SiMe_{3})_{2}(SiPh_{3}))_{2}]^{–}	Kysliak, Oleksandr; Kunz, Tanja; Schnepf, Andreas (2017). "Metalloid Ge_{9}R_{3}^{–} Clusters with Various Silyl Substituents: From Shielded to Open Cluster Cores". European Journal of Inorganic Chemistry. 2017 (4): 805–810. doi:10.1002/ejic.201601134.
[Ge_{9}(Si(SiMe_{3})_{3})(Si(SiMe_{3})_{2}(SiPh_{3}))_{2}]^{–}	Kysliak, Oleksandr; Kunz, Tanja; Schnepf, Andreas (2017). "Metalloid Ge_{9}R_{3}^{–} Clusters with Various Silyl Substituents: From Shielded to Open Cluster Cores". European Journal of Inorganic Chemistry. 2017 (4): 805–810. doi:10.1002/ejic.201601134.
[Ge_{9}(Si(SiMe_{3})_{2}(SiiPr_{3}))_{3}]^{–}	Kysliak, Oleksandr; Kunz, Tanja; Schnepf, Andreas (2017). "Metalloid Ge_{9}R_{3}^{–} Clusters with Various Silyl Substituents: From Shielded to Open Cluster Cores". European Journal of Inorganic Chemistry. 2017 (4): 805–810. doi:10.1002/ejic.201601134.
[Ge_{9}(SiH^{t}Bu_{2})_{3}]^{–}	Kysliak, Oleksandr; Kunz, Tanja; Schnepf, Andreas (2017). "Metalloid Ge_{9}R_{3}^{–} Clusters with Various Silyl Substituents: From Shielded to Open Cluster Cores". European Journal of Inorganic Chemistry. 2017 (4): 805–810. doi:10.1002/ejic.201601134.
(Ge_{9}{Si(TMS)_{3}}_{2})(P^{t}Bu_{2}CuNHC^{Mes})	Geitner, Felix S.; Wallach, Christoph; Fässler, Thomas F. (2018). "On the Variable Reactivity of Phosphine-Functionalized [Ge_{9}] Clusters: Zintl Cluster-Substituted Phosphines or Phosphine-Substituted Zintl Clusters". Chemistry – A European Journal. 24 (16): 4103–4110. doi:10.1002/chem.201705678. PMID 29322565.
NHC^{Dipp}Cu[η^{3}-(Ge_{9}{Si(TMS)_{3}}_{2})(PMes_{2})]	Geitner, Felix S.; Wallach, Christoph; Fässler, Thomas F. (2018). "On the Variable Reactivity of Phosphine-Functionalized [Ge_{9}] Clusters: Zintl Cluster-Substituted Phosphines or Phosphine-Substituted Zintl Clusters". Chemistry – A European Journal. 24 (16): 4103–4110. doi:10.1002/chem.201705678. PMID 29322565.
[(Ge_{9}{Si(TMS)_{3}}_{2})(^{t}Bu_{2}PCu)Ge_{9}(Si(TMS)_{3})_{2}]	Geitner, Felix S.; Wallach, Christoph; Fässler, Thomas F. (2018). "On the Variable Reactivity of Phosphine-Functionalized [Ge_{9}] Clusters: Zintl Cluster-Substituted Phosphines or Phosphine-Substituted Zintl Clusters". Chemistry – A European Journal. 24 (16): 4103–4110. doi:10.1002/chem.201705678. PMID 29322565.
Ge_{18}[Si(SiMe_{3})_{3}]_{6}	Kysliak, Oleksandr; Schrenk, Claudio; Schnepf, Andreas (2016). "The Largest Metalloid Group 14 Cluster, Ge_{18}[Si(SiMe_{3})_{3}]_{6}: An Intermediate on the Way to Elemental Germanium". Angewandte Chemie International Edition. 55 (9): 3216–3219. doi:10.1002/anie.201510831. PMID 26822765.

== Palladium ==
Table of the crystal structures of palladium MPCs.
Formula	References
[Pd_{10}(μ-CO)_{8}(μ_{3}-CO)_{4}(PEt_{3})_{6}]	D. Michael P. Mingos and Christopher M. Hill. Synthesis and Characterisation of [Pd_{10}(μ-CO)(μ_{3}-CO)_{4}(PEt_{3})_{6}] and [Pd_{10}(μ-CO)6(μ_{3}-CO)_{2}(μ-CNXylyl)_{2}(PEt_{3})_{6}]. Croat. Chem. Acta 1995, 68, 4, 745-767
[Pd_{10}(μ-CO)6(μ_{3}-CO)_{2}(μ-CNXylyl)_{2}(PEt_{3})_{6}]	D. Michael P. Mingos and Christopher M. Hill. Synthesis and Characterisation of [Pd_{10}(μ-CO)(μ_{3}-CO)_{4}(PEt_{3})_{6}] and [Pd_{10}(μ-CO)6(μ_{3}-CO)_{2}(μ-CNXylyl)_{2}(PEt_{3})_{6}]. Croat. Chem. Acta 1995, 68, 4, 745-767
Pd_{10}(CO)_{14}(PBu^{n}_{3})_{4}	Mednikov, E.G.; Eremenko, N.K.; Slovokhotov, Yu.L.; Struchkov, Yu.T.; Gubin, S.P. (1983). "Synthesis and x-ray structure of 10-vertex palladium carbonylphosphine cluster with minimal PBun3 content". Journal of Organometallic Chemistry. 258 (2): 247–255. doi:10.1016/S0022-328X(00)99262-3.
Pd_{12}(CO)_{12}(PBu^{n}_{3})_{6}	Mednikov, E.G; Struchkov, Yu.T; Slovokhotov, Yu.L (1998). "Synthesis and X-ray structure of a novel 12-nuclear cluster Pd12(CO)12(PBun3)6". Journal of Organometallic Chemistry. 566 (1–2): 15–20. doi:10.1016/S0022-328X(98)00633-0.
Pd_{12}(CO)_{12}(PPh_{3})_{6}	Kawano, Masaki; Bacon, Jeffrey W.; Campana, Charles F.; Winger, Brian E.; Dudek, James D.; Sirchio, Scott A.; Scruggs, Sabrina L.; Geiser, Urs; Dahl, Lawrence F. (2001). "High-Nuclearity Close-Packed Palladium-Nickel Carbonyl Phosphine Clusters: Heteropalladium [Pd_{16}Ni_{4}(CO)_{22}(PPH_{3})_{4}]^{2-}and [Pd_{33}Ni_{9}(CO)_{41}(PPH_{3})_{6}]^{4-}Containing Pseudo- T _{d} CCP Pd_{16}Ni_{4}and Pseudo- D _{3} _{h} HCP Pd_{33}Ni_{9}Cores". Inorganic Chemistry. 40 (11): 2554–2569. doi:10.1021/ic000979p. PMID 11350234.
Pd_{16}(CO)_{13}(PMe_{3})_{9}	Tran, Nguyet T.; Kawano, Masaki; Dahl, Lawrence F. (2001). "High-nuclearity palladium carbonyl trimethylphosphine clusters containing unprecedented face-condensed icosahedral-based transition-metal core geometries: Proposed growth patterns from a centered Pd13 icosahedron†". Journal of the Chemical Society, Dalton Transactions (19): 2731–2748. doi:10.1039/B103547A.
[Pd_{29}(CO)_{28}(PPh_{3})_{7}]^{2-}	Kawano, Masaki; Bacon, Jeffrey W.; Campana, Charles F.; Winger, Brian E.; Dudek, James D.; Sirchio, Scott A.; Scruggs, Sabrina L.; Geiser, Urs; Dahl, Lawrence F. (2001). "High-Nuclearity Close-Packed Palladium-Nickel Carbonyl Phosphine Clusters: Heteropalladium [Pd_{16}Ni_{4}(CO)_{22}(PPH_{3})_{4}]^{2-}and [Pd_{33}Ni_{9}(CO)_{41}(PPH_{3})_{6}]^{4-}Containing Pseudo- T _{d} CCP Pd_{16}Ni_{4}and Pseudo- D _{3} _{h} HCP Pd_{33}Ni_{9}Cores". Inorganic Chemistry. 40 (11): 2554–2569. doi:10.1021/ic000979p. PMID 11350234.
Pd_{30}(CO)_{26}(PEt_{3})_{10}	Mednikov, Eugeny G.; Ivanov, Sergei A.; Dahl, Lawrence F. (2003). "[Pd_{30}(CO)_{26}(PEt_{3})_{10}] and [Pd_{54}(CO)_{40}(PEt_{3})_{14}]: Generation of Nanosized Pd_{30}- and Pd_{54}-Core Geometries Containing Interpenetrating Cuboctahedral-Based Metal Polyhedra". Angewandte Chemie International Edition. 42 (3): 323–327. doi:10.1002/anie.200390107. PMID 12548690.
Pd_{35}(CO)_{23}(PMe_{3})_{15}	Tran, Nguyet T.; Kawano, Masaki; Dahl, Lawrence F. (2001). "High-nuclearity palladium carbonyl trimethylphosphine clusters containing unprecedented face-condensed icosahedral-based transition-metal core geometries: Proposed growth patterns from a centered Pd13 icosahedron†". Journal of the Chemical Society, Dalton Transactions (19): 2731–2748. doi:10.1039/B103547A.
Pd_{39}(CO)_{23}(PMe_{3})_{16}	Tran, Nguyet T.; Kawano, Masaki; Dahl, Lawrence F. (2001). "High-nuclearity palladium carbonyl trimethylphosphine clusters containing unprecedented face-condensed icosahedral-based transition-metal core geometries: Proposed growth patterns from a centered Pd13 icosahedron†". Journal of the Chemical Society, Dalton Transactions (19): 2731–2748. doi:10.1039/B103547A.
Pd_{54}(CO)_{40}(PEt_{3})_{14}	Mednikov, Eugeny G.; Ivanov, Sergei A.; Dahl, Lawrence F. (2003). "[Pd_{30}(CO)_{26}(PEt_{3})_{10}] and [Pd_{54}(CO)_{40}(PEt_{3})_{14}]: Generation of Nanosized Pd_{30}- and Pd_{54}-Core Geometries Containing Interpenetrating Cuboctahedral-Based Metal Polyhedra". Angewandte Chemie International Edition. 42 (3): 323–327. doi:10.1002/anie.200390107. PMID 12548690.
Pd_{55}(P^{i}Pr_{3})_{12}(μ_{3}-CO)_{20}	Erickson, Jeremiah D.; Mednikov, Evgueni G.; Ivanov, Sergei A.; Dahl, Lawrence F. (2016). "Isolation and Structural Characterization of a Mackay 55-Metal-Atom Two-Shell Icosahedron of Pseudo- I _{h} Symmetry, Pd_{55}L_{12}(μ_{3}-CO)_{20} (L = PR_{3}, R = Isopropyl): Comparative Analysis with Interior Two-Shell Icosahedral Geometries in Capped Three-Shell Pd_{145}, Pt-Centered Four-Shell Pd–Pt M_{165}, and Four-Shell Au_{133} Nanoclusters". Journal of the American Chemical Society. 138 (5): 1502–1505. Bibcode:2016JAChS.138.1502E. doi:10.1021/jacs.5b13076. PMID 26790717.
Pd_{59}(CO)_{32}(PMe_{3})_{21}	Tran, Nguyet T.; Kawano, Masaki; Powell, Douglas R.; Dahl, Lawrence F. (1998). "Pd_{59}(CO)_{32}(PMe_{3})_{21}: A Nanosized Metal Cluster Containing a Trigonal D _{3} Pd_{59} Core with 11 Interior Palladium Atoms". Journal of the American Chemical Society. 120 (42): 10986–10987. Bibcode:1998JAChS.12010986T. doi:10.1021/ja9827346.
Pd_{59}(CO)_{32}(PMe_{3})_{21}	Tran, Nguyet T.; Kawano, Masaki; Dahl, Lawrence F. (2001). "High-nuclearity palladium carbonyl trimethylphosphine clusters containing unprecedented face-condensed icosahedral-based transition-metal core geometries: Proposed growth patterns from a centered Pd13 icosahedron†". Journal of the Chemical Society, Dalton Transactions (19): 2731–2748. doi:10.1039/B103547A.
Pd_{69}(CO)_{36}(PEt_{3})_{18}	Tran, Nguyet T.; Dahl, Lawrence F. (2003). "Nanosized [Pd_{69}(CO)_{36}(PEt_{3})_{18}]: Metal-Core Geometry Containing a Linear Assembly of Three Face-Sharing Centered Pd_{33} Icosahedra Inside of a Hexagonal-Shaped Pd_{30} Tube". Angewandte Chemie International Edition. 42 (30): 3533–3537. doi:10.1002/anie.200351738. PMID 12900974.
Pd_{145}(CO)_{51}(PEt_{3})_{30}	Tran, Nguyet T.; Powell, Douglas R.; Dahl, Lawrence F. (2000). "Nanosized Pd145(CO)x(PEt3)30 Containing a Capped Three-Shell 145-Atom Metal-Core Geometry of Pseudo Icosahedral Symmetry". Angewandte Chemie. 39 (22): 4121–4125. Bibcode:2000AngCh..39.4121T. doi:10.1002/1521-3773(20001117)39:22<4121::AID-ANIE4121>3.0.CO;2-A. PMID 11093227.

== Mixed metal ==
Table of the crystal structures of alloy and doped MPCs.
Formula	References
[Au{Pt_{3}(μ-CO)_{3}(PPh_{3})_{3}}_{2}]^{+}	Hallam, Malcolm F.; Mingos, D. Michael P.; Adatia, Trushar; McPartlin, Mary (1988). "Synthesis of Group 1B sandwich cluster compounds with [Pt_{3}(μ-CO)_{3}(PPH_{3})_{3}] and the structural characterisation of [M{Pt_{3}(μ-CO)_{3}(PPH_{3})_{3}}_{2}]PF_{6}(M = Au or Cu) by single-crystal X-ray techniques". J. Chem. Soc., Dalton Trans. (2): 335–340. doi:10.1039/DT9880000335.
[Cu{Pt_{3}(μ-CO)_{3}(PPh_{3})_{3}}_{2}]^{+}	Hallam, Malcolm F.; Mingos, D. Michael P.; Adatia, Trushar; McPartlin, Mary (1988). "Synthesis of Group 1B sandwich cluster compounds with [Pt_{3}(μ-CO)_{3}(PPH_{3})_{3}] and the structural characterisation of [M{Pt_{3}(μ-CO)_{3}(PPH_{3})_{3}}_{2}]PF_{6}(M = Au or Cu) by single-crystal X-ray techniques". J. Chem. Soc., Dalton Trans. (2): 335–340. doi:10.1039/DT9880000335.
Au_{2}Cu_{6}(SAdm)_{6}(PPh_{3})_{2}	Kang, Xi; Wang, Shuxin; Song, Yongbo; Jin, Shan; Sun, Guodong; Yu, Haizhu; Zhu, Manzhou (2016). "Bimetallic Au_{2}Cu_{6} Nanoclusters: Strong Luminescence Induced by the Aggregation of Copper(I) Complexes with Gold(0) Species". Angewandte Chemie International Edition. 55 (11): 3611–3614. doi:10.1002/anie.201600241. PMID 26890334.
[Au_{4}Cu_{4}(DPPM)_{2}(SAdm)_{5}]^{+}	Yu, Wei; Hu, Daqiao; Xiong, Lin; Li, Yangfeng; Kang, Xi; Chen, Shuang; Wang, Shuxin; Pei, Yong; Zhu, Manzhou (2019). "Isomer Structural Transformation in Au–Cu Alloy Nanoclusters: Water Ripple-Like Transfer of Thiol Ligands". Particle & Particle Systems Characterization. 36 (5). doi:10.1002/ppsc.201800494.
[Au_{4}Cu_{5}(C_{6}H_{11}S)_{6}(DPPM)_{2}]^{+}	Zhou, Manman; Jin, Shan; Wei, Xiao; Yuan, Qianqin; Wang, Shuxin; Du, Yuanxin; Zhu, Manzhou (2020). "Reversible Cu–S Motif Transformation and Au_{4} Distortion via Thiol Ligand Exchange Engineering". The Journal of Physical Chemistry C. 124 (13): 7531–7538. doi:10.1021/acs.jpcc.0c00204.
Au_{5}Cu_{6}(Dppf)_{2}(SAdm)_{6})	Deng, Huijuan; Bai, Yuyuan; Zhou, Manman; Bao, Yizheng; Jin, Shan; Li, Xiaowu; Yu, Haizhu; Zhu, Manzhou (2020). "Structure and Properties of Au_{5}Cu_{6}(DPPF)_{2}(SAdm)_{6})(BPH_{4})". The Journal of Physical Chemistry C. 124 (39): 21867–21873. doi:10.1021/acs.jpcc.0c06978.
((C_{5}Me_{5})*AlCu)_{6}H_{4}	Ganesamoorthy, Chelladurai; Weßing, Jana; Kroll, Clarissa; Seidel, Rüdiger W.; Gemel, Christian; Fischer, Roland A. (2014). "The Intermetalloid Cluster [(Cp*AlCu)_{6}H_{4}], Embedding a Cu_{6} Core Inside an Octahedral Al_{6} Shell: Molecular Models of Hume–Rothery Nanophases". Angewandte Chemie International Edition. 53 (30): 7943–7947. doi:10.1002/anie.201402149. PMID 24962074.
((C_{5}Me_{5})*AlCu)_{6}H_{3}(N=CHPh)	Ganesamoorthy, Chelladurai; Weßing, Jana; Kroll, Clarissa; Seidel, Rüdiger W.; Gemel, Christian; Fischer, Roland A. (2014). "The Intermetalloid Cluster [(Cp*AlCu)_{6}H_{4}], Embedding a Cu_{6} Core Inside an Octahedral Al_{6} Shell: Molecular Models of Hume–Rothery Nanophases". Angewandte Chemie International Edition. 53 (30): 7943–7947. doi:10.1002/anie.201402149. PMID 24962074.
[Ag_{12}Au_{1}(Pz(CF_{3})_{2})_{6}(CCPh)_{8})]^{−}	Zheng, Ji; Wang, Jia-Nan; Wang, Ting; Wu, Kun; Wei, Rong-Jia; Lu, Weigang; Li, Dan (2021). "Phosphorescent Metal Rotaxane-like Bimetallic Ag/Au Clusters". The Journal of Physical Chemistry C. 125 (17): 9400–9410. doi:10.1021/acs.jpcc.1c00621.
[Ag_{12}Au_{1}(Pz(CF_{3})_{2})_{6}(CCPhF)_{8})]^{−}	Zheng, Ji; Wang, Jia-Nan; Wang, Ting; Wu, Kun; Wei, Rong-Jia; Lu, Weigang; Li, Dan (2021). "Phosphorescent Metal Rotaxane-like Bimetallic Ag/Au Clusters". The Journal of Physical Chemistry C. 125 (17): 9400–9410. doi:10.1021/acs.jpcc.1c00621.
[Ag_{12}Au_{1}(Pz(CF_{3})_{2})_{6}(CCPhOMe)_{8})]^{−}	Zheng, Ji; Wang, Jia-Nan; Wang, Ting; Wu, Kun; Wei, Rong-Jia; Lu, Weigang; Li, Dan (2021). "Phosphorescent Metal Rotaxane-like Bimetallic Ag/Au Clusters". The Journal of Physical Chemistry C. 125 (17): 9400–9410. doi:10.1021/acs.jpcc.1c00621.
[Au_{13}Cu_{2}(PPh_{3})_{6}(SPy)_{6})]^{+}	Yang, Huayan; Wang, Yu; Lei, Jing; Shi, Lei; Wu, Xiaohu; Mäkinen, Ville; Lin, Shuichao; Tang, Zichao; He, Jian; Häkkinen, Hannu; Zheng, Lansun; Zheng, Nanfeng (2013). "Ligand-Stabilized Au_{13}Cu_{x} ( x = 2, 4, 8) Bimetallic Nanoclusters: Ligand Engineering to Control the Exposure of Metal Sites". Journal of the American Chemical Society. 135 (26): 9568–9571. Bibcode:2013JAChS.135.9568Y. doi:10.1021/ja402249s. PMID 23789787.
[Au_{7}Ag_{6}Cu_{2}(SCH_{2}Ph)_{6}]^{+}	Shen, Hui; Xu, Zhen; Wang, Lingzheng; Han, Ying-Zi; Liu, Xianhu; Malola, Sami; Teo, Boon K.; Häkkinen, Hannu; Zheng, Nanfeng (2021). "Tertiary Chiral Nanostructures from C−H⋅⋅⋅F Directed Assembly of Chiroptical Superatoms". Angewandte Chemie International Edition. 60 (41): 22411–22416. doi:10.1002/anie.202108141. PMID 34347339.
[Au_{2}Pd_{14}(μ_{3}-CO)_{7}(μ_{2}-CO)_{2}(PMe_{3})_{11}]^{2+}	Copley, Royston C. B.; Hill, Christopher M.; Mingos, D. Michael P. (1995). "Synthesis and structural characterization of [Au2Pd14(?3-CO)7(?2-CO)2(PMe3)11](PF6)2?An icosahedrally-based high nuclearity mixed metal cluster". Journal of Cluster Science. 6: 71–91. doi:10.1007/BF01175837.
[Au_{13}Cu_{4}(PPh_{2}Py)_{4}(SC_{6}H_{4}-^{t}Bu)_{8})]^{+}	Yang, Huayan; Wang, Yu; Lei, Jing; Shi, Lei; Wu, Xiaohu; Mäkinen, Ville; Lin, Shuichao; Tang, Zichao; He, Jian; Häkkinen, Hannu; Zheng, Lansun; Zheng, Nanfeng (2013). "Ligand-Stabilized Au_{13}Cu_{x} ( x = 2, 4, 8) Bimetallic Nanoclusters: Ligand Engineering to Control the Exposure of Metal Sites". Journal of the American Chemical Society. 135 (26): 9568–9571. Bibcode:2013JAChS.135.9568Y. doi:10.1021/ja402249s. PMID 23789787.
[Au_{13}Cu_{4}(PPh_{2}Py)_{3}(SePh)_{9}]	Song, Yongbo; Lv, Ying; Zhou, Meng; Luo, Tian-Yi; Zhao, Shuo; Rosi, Nathaniel L.; Yu, Haizhu; Zhu, Manzhou; Jin, Rongchao (2018). "Single-ligand exchange on an Au–Cu bimetal nanocluster and mechanism". Nanoscale. 10 (25): 12093–12099. doi:10.1039/C8NR01611A. PMID 29911717.
[Au_{7}Cu_{12}(dppy)_{6}(TBBT)_{6}Br_{4}]^{3+}	Song, Yongbo; Weng, Shiyin; Li, Hao; Yu, Haizhu; Zhu, Manzhou (2019). "The Structure of a Au_{7}Cu_{12} Bimetal Nanocluster and Its Strong Emission". Inorganic Chemistry. 58 (11): 7136–7140. doi:10.1021/acs.inorgchem.9b00547. PMID 31094521.
[Pd_{16}Ni_{4}(CO)_{22}(PPh_{3})_{4}]^{2-}	Kawano, Masaki; Bacon, Jeffrey W.; Campana, Charles F.; Winger, Brian E.; Dudek, James D.; Sirchio, Scott A.; Scruggs, Sabrina L.; Geiser, Urs; Dahl, Lawrence F. (2001). "High-Nuclearity Close-Packed Palladium-Nickel Carbonyl Phosphine Clusters: Heteropalladium [Pd_{16}Ni_{4}(CO)_{22}(PPH_{3})_{4}]^{2-}and [Pd_{33}Ni_{9}(CO)_{41}(PPH_{3})_{6}]^{4-}Containing Pseudo- T _{d} CCP Pd_{16}Ni_{4}and Pseudo- D _{3} _{h} HCP Pd_{33}Ni_{9}Cores". Inorganic Chemistry. 40 (11): 2554–2569. doi:10.1021/ic000979p. PMID 11350234.
[Au_{13}Cu_{8}(PPh_{2}Py)_{12}]^{+}	Yang, Huayan; Wang, Yu; Lei, Jing; Shi, Lei; Wu, Xiaohu; Mäkinen, Ville; Lin, Shuichao; Tang, Zichao; He, Jian; Häkkinen, Hannu; Zheng, Lansun; Zheng, Nanfeng (2013). "Ligand-Stabilized Au_{13}Cu_{x} ( x = 2, 4, 8) Bimetallic Nanoclusters: Ligand Engineering to Control the Exposure of Metal Sites". Journal of the American Chemical Society. 135 (26): 9568–9571. Bibcode:2013JAChS.135.9568Y. doi:10.1021/ja402249s. PMID 23789787.
Au_{20}Ag(S-tBu)_{15}	Yang, Sha; Chai, Jinsong; Song, Yongbo; Fan, Jiqiang; Chen, Tao; Wang, Shuxin; Yu, Haizhu; Li, Xiaowu; Zhu, Manzhou (2017). "In Situ Two-Phase Ligand Exchange: A New Method for the Synthesis of Alloy Nanoclusters with Precise Atomic Structures". Journal of the American Chemical Society. 139 (16): 5668–5671. Bibcode:2017JAChS.139.5668Y. doi:10.1021/jacs.7b00668. PMID 28383901.
Au_{16}Ag_{5}(S-tBu)_{15}	Yang, Sha; Chai, Jinsong; Song, Yongbo; Fan, Jiqiang; Chen, Tao; Wang, Shuxin; Yu, Haizhu; Li, Xiaowu; Zhu, Manzhou (2017). "In Situ Two-Phase Ligand Exchange: A New Method for the Synthesis of Alloy Nanoclusters with Precise Atomic Structures". Journal of the American Chemical Society. 139 (16): 5668–5671. Bibcode:2017JAChS.139.5668Y. doi:10.1021/jacs.7b00668. PMID 28383901.
Au_{16}Cu_{5}(S-tBu)_{15}	Yang, Sha; Chai, Jinsong; Song, Yongbo; Fan, Jiqiang; Chen, Tao; Wang, Shuxin; Yu, Haizhu; Li, Xiaowu; Zhu, Manzhou (2017). "In Situ Two-Phase Ligand Exchange: A New Method for the Synthesis of Alloy Nanoclusters with Precise Atomic Structures". Journal of the American Chemical Society. 139 (16): 5668–5671. Bibcode:2017JAChS.139.5668Y. doi:10.1021/jacs.7b00668. PMID 28383901.
Au_{22}Cd(SAdm)_{16}	Li, Yingwei; Cowan, Michael J.; Zhou, Meng; Luo, Tian-Yi; Song, Yongbo; Wang, He; Rosi, Nathaniel L.; Mpourmpakis, Giannis; Jin, Rongchao (2020). "Atom-by-Atom Evolution of the Same Ligand-Protected Au_{21}, Au_{22}, Au_{22}Cd_{1}, and Au_{24} Nanocluster Series". Journal of the American Chemical Society. 142 (48): 20426–20433. Bibcode:2020JAChS.14220426L. doi:10.1021/jacs.0c09110. PMID 33170677.
[PdAg_{24}(SPhCl_{2})_{18}]^{2–}	Yan, Juanzhu; Su, Haifeng; Yang, Huayan; Malola, Sami; Lin, Shuichao; Häkkinen, Hannu; Zheng, Nanfeng (2015). "Total Structure and Electronic Structure Analysis of Doped Thiolated Silver [MAg_{24}(SR)_{18}]^{2–} (M = Pd, Pt) Clusters". Journal of the American Chemical Society. 137 (37): 11880–11883. Bibcode:2015JAChS.13711880Y. doi:10.1021/jacs.5b07186. PMID 26351859.
[PtAg_{24}(SPhCl_{2})_{18}]^{2–}	Yan, Juanzhu; Su, Haifeng; Yang, Huayan; Malola, Sami; Lin, Shuichao; Häkkinen, Hannu; Zheng, Nanfeng (2015). "Total Structure and Electronic Structure Analysis of Doped Thiolated Silver [MAg_{24}(SR)_{18}]^{2–} (M = Pd, Pt) Clusters". Journal of the American Chemical Society. 137 (37): 11880–11883. Bibcode:2015JAChS.13711880Y. doi:10.1021/jacs.5b07186. PMID 26351859.
Au_{24}Cd(PET)_{18}	Wang, Shuxin; Song, Yongbo; Jin, Shan; Liu, Xia; Zhang, Jun; Pei, Yong; Meng, Xiangming; Chen, Man; Li, Peng; Zhu, Manzhou (2015). "Metal Exchange Method Using Au_{25}Nanoclusters as Templates for Alloy Nanoclusters with Atomic Precision". Journal of the American Chemical Society. 137 (12): 4018–4021. Bibcode:2015JAChS.137.4018W. doi:10.1021/ja511635g. PMID 25799517.
[Au_{13}Ag_{12}(PPh_{3})_{10}Cl_{8}]^{+}	Liu, Lingli; Song, Yongbo; Chong, Hanbao; Yang, Sha; Xiang, Ji; Jin, Shan; Kang, Xi; Zhang, Jun; Yu, Haizhu; Zhu, Manzhou (2016). "Size-confined growth of atom-precise nanoclusters in metal–organic frameworks and their catalytic applications". Nanoscale. 8 (3): 1407–1412. Bibcode:2016Nanos...8.1407L. doi:10.1039/C5NR06930K. PMID 26669234.
[Ag_{24}Au(SC_{6}H_{11})_{18}]^{−}	Jin, Renxi; Zhao, Shuo; Liu, Chong; Zhou, Meng; Panapitiya, Gihan; Xing, Yan; Rosi, Nathaniel L.; Lewis, James P.; Jin, Rongchao (2017). "Controlling Ag-doping in [Ag_{x}Au_{25−x}(SC_{6}H_{11})_{18}]^{−}nanoclusters: Cryogenic optical, electronic and electrocatalytic properties". Nanoscale. 9 (48): 19183–19190. doi:10.1039/C7NR05871C. PMID 29186224.
[Ag_{20}Au_{5}(SC_{6}H_{11})_{18}]^{−}	Jin, Renxi; Zhao, Shuo; Liu, Chong; Zhou, Meng; Panapitiya, Gihan; Xing, Yan; Rosi, Nathaniel L.; Lewis, James P.; Jin, Rongchao (2017). "Controlling Ag-doping in [Ag_{x}Au_{25−x}(SC_{6}H_{11})_{18}]^{−}nanoclusters: Cryogenic optical, electronic and electrocatalytic properties". Nanoscale. 9 (48): 19183–19190. doi:10.1039/C7NR05871C. PMID 29186224.
[Ag_{19}Au_{6}(SC_{6}H_{11})_{18}]^{−}	Jin, Renxi; Zhao, Shuo; Liu, Chong; Zhou, Meng; Panapitiya, Gihan; Xing, Yan; Rosi, Nathaniel L.; Lewis, James P.; Jin, Rongchao (2017). "Controlling Ag-doping in [Ag_{x}Au_{25−x}(SC_{6}H_{11})_{18}]^{−}nanoclusters: Cryogenic optical, electronic and electrocatalytic properties". Nanoscale. 9 (48): 19183–19190. doi:10.1039/C7NR05871C. PMID 29186224.
[Cu_{2}Au_{23}(PPh_{3})_{10}(SC_{2}H_{4}Ph)_{5}Cl_{2}]^{2+}	Yang, Sha; Chai, Jinsong; Chen, Tao; Rao, Bo; Pan, Yiting; Yu, Haizhu; Zhu, Manzhou (2017). "Crystal Structures of Two New Gold–Copper Bimetallic Nanoclusters: Cu_{x}Au_{25– x}(PPH_{3})_{10}(PHC_{2}H_{4}S)_{5}Cl_{2}^{2+} and Cu_{3}Au_{34}(PPH_{3})_{13}(^{t}BuPhCH_{2}S)_{6}S_{2}^{3+}". Inorganic Chemistry. 56 (4): 1771–1774. doi:10.1021/acs.inorgchem.6b02016. PMID 28140578.
Pd_{2}Au_{23}(PPh_{3})_{10}Br_{7}	Kang, Xi; Xiang, Ji; Lv, Ying; Du, Wenjun; Yu, Haizhu; Wang, Shuxin; Zhu, Manzhou (2017). "Synthesis and Structure of Self-Assembled Pd_{2}Au_{23}(PPH_{3})_{10}Br_{7} Nanocluster: Exploiting Factors That Promote Assembly of Icosahedral Nano-Building-Blocks". Chemistry of Materials. 29 (16): 6856–6862. doi:10.1021/acs.chemmater.7b02015.
[Au_{25–x}Cu_{x}(PET)_{18}]^{−}	Hossain, Sakiat; Suzuki, Daiki; Iwasa, Takeshi; Kaneko, Ryo; Suzuki, Taiyo; Miyajima, Sayuri; Iwamatsu, Yuki; Pollitt, Stephan; Kawawaki, Tokuhisa; Barrabés, Noelia; Rupprechter, Günther; Negishi, Yuichi (2020). "Determining and Controlling Cu-Substitution Sites in Thiolate-Protected Gold-Based 25-Atom Alloy Nanoclusters". The Journal of Physical Chemistry C. 124 (40): 22304–22313. doi:10.1021/acs.jpcc.0c06858.
Au_{24–x}PtCu_{x}(PET)_{18}	Hossain, Sakiat; Suzuki, Daiki; Iwasa, Takeshi; Kaneko, Ryo; Suzuki, Taiyo; Miyajima, Sayuri; Iwamatsu, Yuki; Pollitt, Stephan; Kawawaki, Tokuhisa; Barrabés, Noelia; Rupprechter, Günther; Negishi, Yuichi (2020). "Determining and Controlling Cu-Substitution Sites in Thiolate-Protected Gold-Based 25-Atom Alloy Nanoclusters". The Journal of Physical Chemistry C. 124 (40): 22304–22313. doi:10.1021/acs.jpcc.0c06858.
Ag_{23}Pd_{2}(PPh_{3})_{10}Cl_{7}	Hossain, Sakiat; Miyajima, Sayuri; Iwasa, Takeshi; Kaneko, Ryo; Sekine, Taishu; Ikeda, Ayaka; Kawawaki, Tokuhisa; Taketsugu, Tetsuya; Negishi, Yuichi (2021). "[Ag23Pd2(PPh3)10Cl7]: A new family of synthesizable bi-icosahedral superatomic molecules". The Journal of Chemical Physics. 155 (2): 024302. doi:10.1063/5.0057005. PMID 34266257.
[Au_{13}Ag_{16}(C_{10}H_{6}NO)_{24}]^{3-}	Qin, Zhaoxian; Sharma, Sachil; Wan, Chong-Qing; Malola, Sami; Xu, Wen-wu; Häkkinen, Hannu; Li, Gao (2021). "A Homoleptic Alkynyl-Ligated [Au_{13}Ag_{16}L_{24}]^{3−} Cluster as a Catalytically Active Eight-Electron Superatom". Angewandte Chemie International Edition. 60 (2): 970–975. doi:10.1002/anie.202011780. PMID 32996286.
[Ag_{22}Cu_{7}(C≡CR)_{16}(PPh_{3})_{5}Cl_{6}]^{−}	Deng, Guocheng; Lee, Kangjae; Deng, Hongwen; Malola, Sami; Bootharaju, Megalamane S.; Häkkinen, Hannu; Zheng, Nanfeng; Hyeon, Taeghwan (2023). "Alkynyl-Protected Chiral Bimetallic Ag_{22}Cu_{7} Superatom with Multiple Chirality Origins". Angewandte Chemie International Edition. 62 (12) e202217483. doi:10.1002/anie.202217483. PMID 36581588.
Au_{24}Cu_{6}(SPh^{t}Bu)_{22}	Chai, Jinsong; Yang, Sha; Lv, Ying; Chong, Hanbao; Yu, Haizhu; Zhu, Manzhou (2019). "Exposing the Delocalized Cu−S π Bonds on the Au_{24}Cu_{6}(SPH t Bu)_{22} Nanocluster and Its Application in Ring-Opening Reactions". Angewandte Chemie International Edition. 58 (44): 15671–15674. doi:10.1002/anie.201907609. PMID 31437333.
Au_{30–x}Ag_{x}(S-^{t}Bu)_{18}	Wijesinghe, Kalpani Hirunika; Sakthivel, Naga Arjun; Jones, Tanya; Dass, Amala (2020). "Crystal Structure of Au_{30– x}Ag_{x}(S- t Bu)_{18} and Effect of the Ligand on Ag Alloying in Gold Nanomolecules". The Journal of Physical Chemistry Letters. 11 (15): 6312–6319. doi:10.1021/acs.jpclett.0c01330. PMID 32700914.
Au_{30-x}Ag_{x}(S-^{t}Bu)18	Li, Yingwei; Taylor, Michael G.; Luo, Tian-Yi; Song, Yongbo; Rosi, Nathaniel L.; Mpourmpakis, Giannis; Jin, Rongchao (2020). "Heteroatom Tracing Reveals the 30-Atom Au–Ag Bimetallic Nanocluster as a Dimeric Structure". The Journal of Physical Chemistry Letters. 11 (17): 7307–7312. doi:10.1021/acs.jpclett.0c01977. PMID 32787300.
Pd_{29}Ni_{3}(CO)_{22}(PMe_{3})_{13}	Tran, Nguyet T.; Kawano, Masaki; Dahl, Lawrence F. (2001). "High-nuclearity palladium carbonyl trimethylphosphine clusters containing unprecedented face-condensed icosahedral-based transition-metal core geometries: Proposed growth patterns from a centered Pd13 icosahedron†". Journal of the Chemical Society, Dalton Transactions (19): 2731–2748. doi:10.1039/B103547A.
[Pt_{2}Cu_{34}(PET)_{22}Cl_{4}]^{2-}	Lee, Sanghwa; Bootharaju, Megalamane S.; Deng, Guocheng; Malola, Sami; Häkkinen, Hannu; Zheng, Nanfeng; Hyeon, Taeghwan (2021). "[Pt_{2}Cu_{34}(PET)_{22}Cl_{4}]^{2–}: An Atomically Precise, 10-Electron PtCu Bimetal Nanocluster with a Direct Pt–Pt Bond". Journal of the American Chemical Society. 143 (31): 12100–12107. Bibcode:2021JAChS.14312100L. doi:10.1021/jacs.1c04002. PMID 34314590.
[Cu_{3}Au_{34}(PPh_{3})_{13}(SCH_{2}Ph^{t}Bu)_{6}S_{2}]^{3+}	Yang, Sha; Chai, Jinsong; Chen, Tao; Rao, Bo; Pan, Yiting; Yu, Haizhu; Zhu, Manzhou (2017). "Crystal Structures of Two New Gold–Copper Bimetallic Nanoclusters: Cu_{x}Au_{25– x}(PPH_{3})_{10}(PHC_{2}H_{4}S)_{5}Cl_{2}^{2+} and Cu_{3}Au_{34}(PPH_{3})_{13}(^{t}BuPhCH_{2}S)_{6}S_{2}^{3+}". Inorganic Chemistry. 56 (4): 1771–1774. doi:10.1021/acs.inorgchem.6b02016. PMID 28140578.
Au_{34}Ag_{4}(SCH_{2}CH_{2}Ph)_{24}	Kumara, Chanaka; Gagnon, Kevin J.; Dass, Amala (2015). "X-ray Crystal Structure of Au_{38– x}Ag_{x}(SCH_{2}CH_{2}Ph)_{24} Alloy Nanomolecules". The Journal of Physical Chemistry Letters. 6 (7): 1223–1228. doi:10.1021/acs.jpclett.5b00270. PMID 26262976.
Au_{37}Cu(2,4-(CH_{3})_{2}C_{6}H_{3}S)_{24}	Chai, Jinsong; Lv, Ying; Yang, Sha; Song, Yongbo; Zan, Xiaofeng; Li, Qinzhen; Yu, Haizhu; Wu, Mingzai; Zhu, Manzhou (2017). "X-ray Crystal Structure and Optical Properties of Au_{38– x}Cu_{x}(2,4-(CH_{3})_{2}C_{6}H_{3}S)_{24} ( x = 0–6) Alloy Nanocluster". The Journal of Physical Chemistry C. 121 (39): 21665–21669. doi:10.1021/acs.jpcc.7b05074.
[Pd_{33}Ni_{9}(CO)_{41}(PPh_{3})_{6}]^{4-}	Kawano, Masaki; Bacon, Jeffrey W.; Campana, Charles F.; Winger, Brian E.; Dudek, James D.; Sirchio, Scott A.; Scruggs, Sabrina L.; Geiser, Urs; Dahl, Lawrence F. (2001). "High-Nuclearity Close-Packed Palladium-Nickel Carbonyl Phosphine Clusters: Heteropalladium [Pd_{16}Ni_{4}(CO)_{22}(PPH_{3})_{4}]^{2-}and [Pd_{33}Ni_{9}(CO)_{41}(PPH_{3})_{6}]^{4-}Containing Pseudo- T _{d} CCP Pd_{16}Ni_{4}and Pseudo- D _{3} _{h} HCP Pd_{33}Ni_{9}Cores". Inorganic Chemistry. 40 (11): 2554–2569. doi:10.1021/ic000979p. PMID 11350234.
[Ag_{28}Cu_{12}(S(PhCl_{2}))_{24}]^{4–}	Yan, Juanzhu; Su, Haifeng; Yang, Huayan; Hu, Chengyi; Malola, Sami; Lin, Shuichao; Teo, Boon K.; Häkkinen, Hannu; Zheng, Nanfeng (2016). "Asymmetric Synthesis of Chiral Bimetallic [Ag_{28}Cu_{12}(SR)_{24}]^{4–} Nanoclusters via Ion Pairing". Journal of the American Chemical Society. 138 (39): 12751–12754. Bibcode:2016JAChS.13812751Y. doi:10.1021/jacs.6b08100. PMID 27626935.
[Au_{12}Ag_{32}(SPhF)_{30}]^{4-}	Yang, Huayan; Wang, Yu; Huang, Huaqi; Gell, Lars; Lehtovaara, Lauri; Malola, Sami; Häkkinen, Hannu; Zheng, Nanfeng (2013). "All-thiol-stabilized Ag44 and Au12Ag32 nanoparticles with single-crystal structures". Nature Communications. 4: 2422. doi:10.1038/ncomms3422. PMID 24005600.
[Au_{12}Ag_{32}(SPhF_{2})_{30}]^{4-}	Yang, Huayan; Wang, Yu; Huang, Huaqi; Gell, Lars; Lehtovaara, Lauri; Malola, Sami; Häkkinen, Hannu; Zheng, Nanfeng (2013). "All-thiol-stabilized Ag44 and Au12Ag32 nanoparticles with single-crystal structures". Nature Communications. 4: 2422. doi:10.1038/ncomms3422. PMID 24005600.
[Au_{12}Ag_{32}(SPhF_{3})_{30}]^{4-}	Yang, Huayan; Wang, Yu; Huang, Huaqi; Gell, Lars; Lehtovaara, Lauri; Malola, Sami; Häkkinen, Hannu; Zheng, Nanfeng (2013). "All-thiol-stabilized Ag44 and Au12Ag32 nanoparticles with single-crystal structures". Nature Communications. 4: 2422. doi:10.1038/ncomms3422. PMID 24005600.
[Au_{12}Ag_{32}(SPhF_{2})_{30}]^{4-}	Zhang, Xin; Yang, Hua-Yan; Zhao, Xiao-Jing; Wang, Yu; Zheng, Nan-Feng (2014). "The effects of surface ligands and counter cations on the stability of anionic thiolated M12Ag32 (M=Au, Ag) nanoclusters". Chinese Chemical Letters. 25 (6): 839–843. doi:10.1016/j.cclet.2014.05.027.
[Au_{12}Ag_{32}(SPhCF_{3})_{30}]^{4-}	Zhang, Xin; Yang, Hua-Yan; Zhao, Xiao-Jing; Wang, Yu; Zheng, Nan-Feng (2014). "The effects of surface ligands and counter cations on the stability of anionic thiolated M12Ag32 (M=Au, Ag) nanoclusters". Chinese Chemical Letters. 25 (6): 839–843. doi:10.1016/j.cclet.2014.05.027.
[Au_{10}Ag_{34}(SC_{6}H_{3}F_{2})_{30}]^{4–}	Su, Haifeng; Wang, Yu; Ren, Liting; Yuan, Peng; Teo, Boon K.; Lin, Shuichao; Zheng, Lansun; Zheng, Nanfeng (2019). "Fractal Patterns in Nucleation and Growth of Icosahedral Core of [Au_{n}Ag_{44– n}(SC_{6}H_{3}F_{2})_{30}]^{4–} ( n = 0–12) via ab Initio Synthesis: Continuously Tunable Composition Control". Inorganic Chemistry. 58 (1): 259–264. doi:10.1021/acs.inorgchem.8b02249. PMID 30582690.
[Au_{12}Ag_{32}(SC_{6}H_{3}F_{2})_{30}]^{4–}	Su, Haifeng; Wang, Yu; Ren, Liting; Yuan, Peng; Teo, Boon K.; Lin, Shuichao; Zheng, Lansun; Zheng, Nanfeng (2019). "Fractal Patterns in Nucleation and Growth of Icosahedral Core of [Au_{n}Ag_{44– n}(SC_{6}H_{3}F_{2})_{30}]^{4–} ( n = 0–12) via ab Initio Synthesis: Continuously Tunable Composition Control". Inorganic Chemistry. 58 (1): 259–264. doi:10.1021/acs.inorgchem.8b02249. PMID 30582690.
Cd_{12}Ag_{32}(SePh)_{36}	Bootharaju, Megalamane S.; Chang, Hogeun; Deng, Guocheng; Malola, Sami; Baek, Woonhyuk; Häkkinen, Hannu; Zheng, Nanfeng; Hyeon, Taeghwan (2019). "Cd_{12}Ag_{32}(SePh)_{36}: Non-Noble Metal Doped Silver Nanoclusters". Journal of the American Chemical Society. 141 (21): 8422–8425. Bibcode:2019JAChS.141.8422B. doi:10.1021/jacs.9b03257. PMID 31083937.
[Au_{12+n}Cu_{32}(SPhCF_{3})_{30+n}]^{4–}	Yang, Huayan; Wang, Yu; Yan, Juanzhu; Chen, Xi; Zhang, Xin; Häkkinen, Hannu; Zheng, Nanfeng (2014). "Structural Evolution of Atomically Precise Thiolated Bimetallic [Au_{12+ n}Cu_{32}(SR)_{30+ n}]^{4–} ( n = 0, 2, 4, 6) Nanoclusters". Journal of the American Chemical Society. 136 (20): 7197–7200. Bibcode:2014JAChS.136.7197Y. doi:10.1021/ja501811j. PMID 24796211.
Au_{5.34}Ag_{44.66}(Dppm)_{6}(SPh-^{t}Bu)_{30}	Du, Wenjun; Jin, Shan; Xiong, Lin; Chen, Man; Zhang, Jun; Zou, Xuejuan; Pei, Yong; Wang, Shuxin; Zhu, Manzhou (2017). "Ag_{50}(DPPM)_{6}(SR)_{30} and Its Homologue Au_{x}Ag_{50– x}(DPPM)_{6}(SR)_{30} Alloy Nanocluster: Seeded Growth, Structure Determination, and Differences in Properties". Journal of the American Chemical Society. 139 (4): 1618–1624. Bibcode:2017JAChS.139.1618D. doi:10.1021/jacs.6b11681. PMID 28111946.
[Cu_{43}Al_{12}](C_{5}Me_{5})_{12}	Weßing, Jana; Ganesamoorthy, Chelladurai; Kahlal, Samia; Marchal, Rémi; Gemel, Christian; Cador, Olivier; Da Silva, Augusto C. H.; Da Silva, Juarez L. F.; Saillard, Jean-Yves; Fischer, Roland A. (2018). "The Mackay-Type Cluster [Cu_{43}Al_{12}](Cp*)_{12}: Open-Shell 67-Electron Superatom with Emerging Metal-Like Electronic Structure" (PDF). Angewandte Chemie International Edition. 57 (44): 14630–14634. doi:10.1002/anie.201806039. PMID 29981271.
[Au_{80}Ag_{30}(C≡CPh)_{42}Cl_{9}]^{+}	Zeng, Jiu-Lian; Guan, Zong-Jie; Du, Yang; Nan, Zi-Ang; Lin, Yu-Mei; Wang, Quan-Ming (2016). "Chloride-Promoted Formation of a Bimetallic Nanocluster Au_{80}Ag_{30} and the Total Structure Determination". Journal of the American Chemical Society. 138 (25): 7848–7851. Bibcode:2016JAChS.138.7848Z. doi:10.1021/jacs.6b04471. PMID 27285954.
Au_{57}Ag_{53}(C≡CPh)_{40}Br_{12}	Guan, Zong-Jie; Zeng, Jiu-Lian; Yuan, Shang-Fu; Hu, Feng; Lin, Yu-Mei; Wang, Quan-Ming (2018). "Au_{57}Ag_{53}(C≡CPH)_{40}Br_{12}: A Large Nanocluster with C _{1} Symmetry". Angewandte Chemie International Edition. 57 (20): 5703–5707. doi:10.1002/anie.201801261. PMID 29575416.
[Au_{74}Ag_{60}(C≡CPh)_{40}Br_{12}]^{2−}	Yuan, Xiting; Malola, Sami; Deng, Guocheng; Chen, Fengjiao; Häkkinen, Hannu; Teo, Boon K.; Zheng, Lansun; Zheng, Nanfeng (2021). "Atomically Precise Alkynyl- and Halide-Protected AuAg Nanoclusters Au_{78}Ag_{66}(C≡CPH)_{48}Cl_{8} and Au_{74}Ag_{60}(C≡CPH)_{40}Br_{12}: The Ligation Effects of Halides". Inorganic Chemistry. 60 (6): 3529–3533. doi:10.1021/acs.inorgchem.0c03462. PMID 33615777.
[Au_{78}Ag_{66}(C≡CPh)_{48}Cl_{8}]^{q−}	Yuan, Xiting; Malola, Sami; Deng, Guocheng; Chen, Fengjiao; Häkkinen, Hannu; Teo, Boon K.; Zheng, Lansun; Zheng, Nanfeng (2021). "Atomically Precise Alkynyl- and Halide-Protected AuAg Nanoclusters Au_{78}Ag_{66}(C≡CPH)_{48}Cl_{8} and Au_{74}Ag_{60}(C≡CPH)_{40}Br_{12}: The Ligation Effects of Halides". Inorganic Chemistry. 60 (6): 3529–3533. doi:10.1021/acs.inorgchem.0c03462. PMID 33615777.
Pd_{164−x}Pt_{x}(CO)_{72}(PPh_{3})_{20}	Mednikov, Evgueni G.; Jewell, Matthew C.; Dahl, Lawrence F. (2007). "Nanosized (μ_{12}-Pt)Pd_{164-} _{x} Pt _{x} (CO)_{72}(PPH_{3})_{20}( x ≈ 7) Containing Pt-Centered Four-Shell 165-Atom Pd−Pt Core with Unprecedented Intershell Bridging Carbonyl Ligands: Comparative Analysis of Icosahedral Shell-Growth Patterns with Geometrically Related Pd_{145}(CO) _{x} (PEt_{3})_{30}( x ≈ 60) Containing Capped Three-Shell Pd_{145}Core". Journal of the American Chemical Society. 129 (37): 11619–11630. doi:10.1021/ja073945q. PMID 17722929.

== Partially experimentally determined ==
Table of partially experimentally determined structures of MPCs.
Formula	References
Ag_{29}(LA)_{12}∩CB_{1}	Nag, Abhijit; Chakraborty, Papri; Thacharon, Athira; Paramasivam, Ganesan; Mondal, Biswajit; Bodiuzzaman, Mohammad; Pradeep, Thalappil (2020). "Atomically Precise Noble Metal Cluster-Assembled Superstructures in Water: Luminescence Enhancement and Sensing". The Journal of Physical Chemistry C. 124 (40): 22298–22303. doi:10.1021/acs.jpcc.0c06770.
Ag_{29}(LA)_{12}@β-CD_{1}	Nag, Abhijit; Chakraborty, Papri; Thacharon, Athira; Paramasivam, Ganesan; Mondal, Biswajit; Bodiuzzaman, Mohammad; Pradeep, Thalappil (2020). "Atomically Precise Noble Metal Cluster-Assembled Superstructures in Water: Luminescence Enhancement and Sensing". The Journal of Physical Chemistry C. 124 (40): 22298–22303. doi:10.1021/acs.jpcc.0c06770.
Au_{68}(SH)_{32}	Azubel, Maia; Koivisto, Jaakko; Malola, Sami; Bushnell, David; Hura, Greg L.; Koh, Ai Leen; Tsunoyama, Hironori; Tsukuda, Tatsuya; Pettersson, Mika; Häkkinen, Hannu; Kornberg, Roger D. (2014). "Electron microscopy of gold nanoparticles at atomic resolution". Science. 345 (6199): 909–912. Bibcode:2014Sci...345..909A. doi:10.1126/science.1251959. PMC 4315941. PMID 25146285.
Au_{144}(3-MBA)_{x}	Azubel, Maia; Koh, Ai Leen; Koyasu, Kiichirou; Tsukuda, Tatsuya; Kornberg, Roger D. (2017). "Structure Determination of a Water-Soluble 144-Gold Atom Particle at Atomic Resolution by Aberration-Corrected Electron Microscopy". ACS Nano. 11 (12): 11866–11871. doi:10.1021/acsnano.7b06051. PMID 29136369.
